= 2015 Washington Huskies football team =

American college football season

2015 Washington Huskies football

Heart of Dallas Bowl champion

Heart of Dallas Bowl, W 44–31 vs. Southern Miss
- Conference: Pac-12 Conference
- North Division
- Record: 7–6 (4–5 Pac-12)
- Head coach: Chris Petersen (2nd season)
- Offensive coordinator: Jonathan Smith (2nd season)
- Offensive scheme: Single set back
- Defensive coordinator: Pete Kwiatkowski (2nd season)
- Base defense: 3–4
- MVPs: Myles Gaskin (offense); Travis Feeney (defense); Ben Burr-Kirven (special teams)
- Captains: Deontae Cooper; Travis Feeney; Jeff Lindquist; Jaydon Mickens; Siosifa Tufunga; Tani Tupou
- Home stadium: Husky Stadium

2015 Pac-12 Conference football standings
	Conf.			Overall
Team	W		L	W		L
North Division
No. 3 Stanford xy$	8	–	1	12	–	2
No. 19 Oregon	7	–	2	9	–	4
Washington State	6	–	3	9	–	4
California	4	–	5	8	–	5
Washington	4	–	5	7	–	6
Oregon State	0	–	9	2	–	10
South Division
USC xy	6	–	3	8	–	6
No. 17 Utah x	6	–	3	10	–	3
UCLA	5	–	4	8	–	5
Arizona State	4	–	5	6	–	7
Arizona	3	–	6	7	–	6
Colorado	1	–	8	4	–	9
Championship: Stanford 41, USC 22
$ – Conference champion; x – Division champion/co-champions; y – Championship game participant; Rankings from AP Poll

The 2015 Washington Huskies football team represented the University of Washington in the 2015 NCAA Division I FBS football season. The team was led by second-year head coach was Chris Petersen. Washington was a member of the North Division of the Pac-12 Conference and played their home games on campus at Alaska Airlines Field at Husky Stadium, in the University District of Seattle. They finished the season 7–6, 4–5 in Pac-12 play to finish in a tie fourth place in the North Division. They were invited to the Heart of Dallas Bowl where they defeated Southern Miss.

== Personnel ==
=== Coaching staff ===
Name	Position	Seasons at Washington	Alma mater
Chris Petersen	Head coach	2nd	UC Davis (1988)
Pete Kwiatkowski	Defensive coordinator	2nd	Boise State (1990)
Jonathan Smith	Offensive coordinator/quarterbacks	2nd	Oregon State (2001)
Bob Gregory	Assistant head coach/linebackers	2nd	Washington State (1987)
Chris Strausser	Associate head coach/offensive line	2nd	Chico State (1989)
Keith Bhonapha	Running backs/recruiting coordinator	2nd	Hawaii (2003)
Jeff Choate	Special teams coordinator/defensive line	2nd	Western Montana (1993)
Jimmy Lake	Defensive backs	2nd	Eastern Washington (2000)
Jordan Paopao	Tight ends	5th	San Diego (2006)
Brent Pease	Receivers	2nd	Montana (1987)

=== Roster ===
2015 Washington Huskies football team roster
Players
Coaches
Offense

Pos.	#	Name	Class
OL	72	Trey Adams	Fr
TE	85	David Ajamu	So
WR	19	Andre Baccellia	Fr
WR	23	Drew Before	Jr
QB	14	Anthony Berg	Jr
TE	94	James Boker	Sr
OL	60	Shane Brostek	Jr
QB	3	Jake Browning	Fr
OL	77	Devin Burleson	Fr
QB	11	K. J. Carta-Samuels	Fr
OL	76	Dexter Charles	Sr
TB	22	Lavon Coleman	So
TB	6	Deontae Cooper	Sr
OL	55	Dane Crane	So
WR	15	Darrell Daniels	Jr
TB	34	Jomon Dotson	Fr
OL	52	Jake Eldrenkamp	Jr
OL	69	Cory Fuavai	Jr
WR	89	John Gardner	Fr
RB	9	Myles Gaskin	Fr
WR	16	Marvin Hall	Sr
OL	70	Jared Hilbers	Fr
OL	71	Matt James	Fr
FB	35	Ralph Kinne	So
OL	73	Andrew Kirkland	So
OL	67	Michael Kneip	Jr
WR	81	Brayden Lenius	So
QB	5	Jeff Lindquist	Jr
WR	28	Nik Little	Jr
TB	30	Gavin McDaniel	Fr
WR	4	Jaydon Mickens	Sr
TE	84	Michael Neal	Fr
WR	86	Taelon Parson	So
TE	82	Joshua Perkins	Sr
WR	87	Dante Pettis	So
WR	21	Quinten Pounds	Fr
WR	29	Josh Rasmussen	Fr
WR	18	Isaiah Renfro	Fr
WR	80	Max Richmond	Fr
OL	59	Henry Roberts	Fr
QB	10	Tony Rodriguez	Jr
WR	1	John Ross III	So
WR	89	Neel Salukhe	So
TE	88	Drew Sample	Fr
OL	79	Coleman Shelton	So
OL	75	Jessie Sosebee	Fr
OL	64	Colin Tanigawa	Sr
OL	74	John Turner	Fr
TB	12	Dwayne Washington	Jr

Defense

Pos.	#	Name	Class
S	32	Budda Baker	So
LB	17	Tevis Bartlett	Fr
CB	9	Brandon Beaver	Jr
LB	15	DJ Beavers	Fr
DB	12	Ian Biddle	Fr
LB	7	Keishawn Bierria	So
DE	96	Shane Bowman	Fr
LB	25	Ben Burr-Kirven	Fr
DB	22	Dustin Bush	Fr
DL	57	John Clark	Fr
CB	35	Brian Clay	Sr
LB	34	Sean Constantine	So
DE	98	Will Dissly	So
LB	41	Travis Feeney	Sr
DE	95	Jarett Finau	Sr
DT	99	Greg Gaines	Fr
CB	3	Darren Gardenhire	So
CB	31	Naijiel Hale	So
DE	92	Jaylen Johnson	Fr
CB	24	Sidney Jones	So
CB	4	Austin Joyner	Fr
CB	20	Kevin King	Jr
LB	47	Scott Lawyer	Sr
CB	19	Brandon Lewis	Fr
LB	42	Cory Littleton	Sr
DE	5	Joe Mathis	Jr
DL	91	Ricky McCoy	Fr
DL	58	Kaleb McGary	Fr
S	14	Joseph McIntosh	Fr
DB	23	Jordan Miller	Fr
LB	29	Connor O'Brien	So
DE	8	Benning Potoa'e	Fr
LB	54	Matt Preston	Fr
DT	11	Elijah Qualls	So
DB	38	Hayden Schuh	Jr
DL	97	Jason Scrempos	Fr
DL	72	Bryce Sterk	Fr
DL	90	Taniela Tupou	Sr
DT	66	Damion Turpin	Jr
S	24	Ezekiel Turner	So
DL	50	Vita Vea	Fr
DB	39	Sean Vergara	Fr
LB	36	Azeem Victor	So
S	27	Trevor Walker	Jr
LB	53	Jake Wambaugh	Fr
S	15	Lavon Washington	Fr
LB	28	Psalm Wooching	Jr

Special teams

Pos.	#	Name	Class
LS	49	AJ Carty	Fr
P	45	Korey Durkee	Sr
LS	51	Luke Hutchinson	So
PK	49	Mitch Johnson	Jr
LS	77	Ryan Masel	Sr
PK	48	Cameron Van Winkle	Jr
P/PK	43	Tristan Vizcaino	So

Head coach

- Chris Petersen
  2nd year at Washington
  alma mater: UC Davis

Coordinators/assistant coaches

- Keith Bhonapha
  running backs/recruiting coordinator
  2nd year at Washington
  alma mater: Hawaii
- Jeff Choate
  special teams coordinator/defensive line
  2nd year at Washington
  alma mater: Western Montana
- Bob Gregory
  assistant head coach/linebackers
  2nd year at Washington
  alma mater: Washington State
- Pete Kwiatkowski
  defensive coordinator
  2nd year at Washington
  alma mater: Boise State
- Jimmy Lake
  defensive backs
  2nd year at Washington
  alma mater: Eastern Washington
- Jordan Paopao
  tight ends
  5th year at Washington
  alma mater: San Diego
- Brent Pease
  receivers
  2nd year at Washington
  alma mater: Montana
- Jonathan Smith
  offensive coordinator/quarterbacks
  2nd year at Washington
  alma mater: Oregon State
- Chris Strausser
  offensive line
  2nd year at Washington
  alma mater: Chico State
- Tim Socha
  strength and conditioning Coach
- Mike McHugh
  director of football operations
- Rich Rasmussen
  director of player personnel
- Gerald Alexander
  graduate assistant
- Kirby Moore
  graduate assistant
- Hansen Sekona
  graduate assistant
- Joshua Taufalele
  graduate assistant

Legend

- (C) Team captain
- (S) Suspended
- (I) Ineligible
- Injured
- Redshirt

Roster
Last update: July 6, 2015

=== Recruiting class ===
College recruiting information (2015)
Name	Hometown	School	Height	Weight	Commit date
Jake Browning; Quarterback	Folsom, CA	Folsom High School	6 ft 2 in (1.88 m)	185 lb (84 kg)	Mar 31, 2014
Jake Browning; Quarterback	Recruit ratings: Scout: Rivals: 247Sports:				
Austin Joyner; Athlete	Marysville, WA	Marysville-Pilchuck High School	5 ft 11 in (1.80 m)	186 lb (84 kg)	Jan 4, 2015
Austin Joyner; Athlete	Recruit ratings: Scout: Rivals: 247Sports:				
Benning Potoa'e; Defensive End	Lakewood, WA	Lakes High School	6 ft 4 in (1.93 m)	270 lb (120 kg)	Jan 22, 2015
Benning Potoa'e; Defensive End	Recruit ratings: Scout: Rivals: 247Sports:				
Henry Roberts; Offensive Tackle	Bellevue, WA	Bellevue High School	6 ft 5 in (1.96 m)	274 lb (124 kg)	Sep 3, 2014
Henry Roberts; Offensive Tackle	Recruit ratings: Scout: Rivals: 247Sports:				
Trey Adams; Offensive Tackle	Wenatchee, WA	Wenatchee High School	6 ft 7 in (2.01 m)	270 lb (120 kg)	Mar 31, 2014
Trey Adams; Offensive Tackle	Recruit ratings: Scout: Rivals: 247Sports:				
Chico McClatcher; Athlete	Federal Way, WA	Federal Way High School	5 ft 8 in (1.73 m)	165 lb (75 kg)	Dec 14, 2014
Chico McClatcher; Athlete	Recruit ratings: Scout: Rivals: 247Sports:				
Isaiah Renfro; Wide Receiver	Chatsworth, CA	Sierra Canyon High School	6 ft 2 in (1.88 m)	185 lb (84 kg)	Jun 21, 2014
Isaiah Renfro; Wide Receiver	Recruit ratings: Scout: Rivals: 247Sports:				
DJ Beavers; Linebacker	Encino, CA	Crespi High School	6 ft 2 in (1.88 m)	210 lb (95 kg)	Sep 21, 2014
DJ Beavers; Linebacker	Recruit ratings: Scout: Rivals: 247Sports:				
Myles Gaskin; Runningback	Seattle, WA	O'Dea High School	5 ft 9 in (1.75 m)	185 lb (84 kg)	Mar 2, 2014
Myles Gaskin; Runningback	Recruit ratings: Scout: Rivals: 247Sports:				
Andre Baccellia; Wide Receiver	Westlake Village, CA	Westlake High School	5 ft 11 in (1.80 m)	170 lb (77 kg)	Aug 8, 2014
Andre Baccellia; Wide Receiver	Recruit ratings: Scout: Rivals: 247Sports:				
Tevis Bartlett; Athlete	Cheyenne, WY	East High School	6 ft 3 in (1.91 m)	215 lb (98 kg)	Dec 18, 2014
Tevis Bartlett; Athlete	Recruit ratings: Scout: Rivals: 247Sports:				
Ben Burr-Kirven; Linebacker	Atherton, CA	Sacred Heart Prep	6 ft 0 in (1.83 m)	200 lb (91 kg)	Sep 17, 2014
Ben Burr-Kirven; Linebacker	Recruit ratings: Scout: Rivals: 247Sports:				
Jared Hilbers; Offensive Tackle	Beaverton, OR	Beaverton High School	6 ft 6 in (1.98 m)	270 lb (120 kg)	Jun 30, 2014
Jared Hilbers; Offensive Tackle	Recruit ratings: Scout: Rivals: 247Sports:				
Kyler Manu; Linebacker	Pocatello, ID	Highland High School	6 ft 2 in (1.88 m)	195 lb (88 kg)	Aug 18, 2014
Kyler Manu; Linebacker	Recruit ratings: Scout: Rivals: 247Sports:				
Ricky McCoy; Defensive Line	Fresno, CA	Roosevelt High School	6 ft 5 in (1.96 m)	265 lb (120 kg)	Dec 15, 2014
Ricky McCoy; Defensive Line	Recruit ratings: Scout: Rivals: 247Sports:				
Jordan Miller; Cornerback	Oceanside, CA	Oceanside High School	6 ft 1 in (1.85 m)	175 lb (79 kg)	Jul 19, 2014
Jordan Miller; Cornerback	Recruit ratings: Scout: Rivals: 247Sports:				
Quinten Pounds; Athlete	Cypress, CA	Cypress High School	6 ft 0 in (1.83 m)	166 lb (75 kg)	Oct 29, 2014
Quinten Pounds; Athlete	Recruit ratings: Scout: Rivals: 247Sports:				
Jason Scrempos; Defensive End	Milpitas, CA	Milpitas High School	6 ft 6 in (1.98 m)	240 lb (110 kg)	Sep 16, 2014
Jason Scrempos; Defensive End	Recruit ratings: Scout: Rivals: 247Sports:				
Jusstis Warren; Linebacker	Tacoma, WA	Lincoln High School	6 ft 3 in (1.91 m)	220 lb (100 kg)	Dec 16, 2014
Jusstis Warren; Linebacker	Recruit ratings: Scout: Rivals: 247Sports:				
Michael Neal; Tight End	Rancho Cucamonga, CA	Etiwanda High School	6 ft 4 in (1.93 m)	210 lb (95 kg)	Jun 19, 2014
Michael Neal; Tight End	Recruit ratings: Scout: Rivals: 247Sports:				
Ezekiel Turner; Safety	Pasadena, MD	Los Angeles Pierce College	6 ft 1 in (1.85 m)	200 lb (91 kg)	Dec 14, 2014
Ezekiel Turner; Safety	Recruit ratings: Scout: Rivals: 247Sports:				
Myles Rice; Defensive End	Richmond, TX	Bush High School	6 ft 4 in (1.93 m)	245 lb (111 kg)	Oct 2, 2014
Myles Rice; Defensive End	Recruit ratings: Scout: Rivals: 247Sports:				
Bryce Sterk; Defensive End	Lynden, WA	Lynden High School	6 ft 5 in (1.96 m)	230 lb (100 kg)	Jan 25, 2015
Bryce Sterk; Defensive End	Recruit ratings: Scout: Rivals: 247Sports:				
AJ Carty; Long snapper	Anaheim, CA	Servite High School	6 ft 4 in (1.93 m)	230 lb (100 kg)	Jun 28, 2014
AJ Carty; Long snapper	Recruit ratings: Scout: Rivals: 247Sports:				
Nik Little; Wide Receiver	Huntington Beach, CA	Golden West Community College	6 ft 5 in (1.96 m)	205 lb (93 kg)	Jun 18, 2015
Nik Little; Wide Receiver	Recruit ratings: Scout: 247Sports:				
Tony Rodriguez; Quarterback	San Francisco, CA	City College of San Francisco	6 ft 3 in (1.91 m)	185 lb (84 kg)	Jun 5, 2015
Tony Rodriguez; Quarterback	Recruit ratings: No ratings found				
Overall recruit ranking: Scout: 23 Rivals: 30 247Sports: 27
Note: In many cases, Scout, Rivals, 247Sports, On3, and ESPN may conflict in their listings of height and weight.; In these cases, the average was taken. ESPN grades are on a 100-point scale.; Sources: "2015 Team Ranking". Rivals.com.

== Schedule ==
Date	Time	Opponent	Site	TV	Result	Attendance
September 4	7:15 p.m.	at No. 23 Boise State*	Albertsons Stadium; Boise, ID	ESPN	L 13–16	36,836
September 12	11:00 a.m.	Sacramento State*	Husky Stadium; Seattle, WA	P12N	W 49–0	55,010
September 19	2:00 p.m.	Utah State*	Husky Stadium; Seattle, WA	P12N	W 31–17	59,464
September 26	2:00 p.m.	California	Husky Stadium; Seattle, WA	P12N	L 24–30	61,066
October 8	6:00 p.m.	at No. 17 USC	Los Angeles Memorial Coliseum; Los Angeles, CA	ESPN	W 17–12	63,623
October 17	7:30 p.m.	Oregon^{†}	Husky Stadium; Seattle, WA (rivalry)	ESPN2	L 20–26	69,285
October 24	7:30 p.m.	at No. 10 Stanford	Stanford Stadium; Stanford, CA	ESPN	L 14–31	50,424
October 31	8:00 p.m.	Arizona	Husky Stadium; Seattle, WA	FS1	W 49–3	50,667
November 7	4:30 p.m.	No. 13 Utah	Husky Stadium; Seattle, WA	FOX	L 23–34	61,420
November 14	12:00 p.m.	at Arizona State	Sun Devil Stadium; Tempe, AZ	P12N	L 17–27	51,695
November 21	3:00 p.m.	at Oregon State	Reser Stadium; Corvallis, OR	P12N	W 52–7	34,390
November 27	12:30 p.m.	No. 20 Washington State	Husky Stadium; Seattle, WA (Apple Cup)	FOX	W 45–10	70,438
December 26	11:20 a.m.	vs. Southern Miss*	Cotton Bowl; Dallas, TX (Heart of Dallas Bowl)	ESPN	W 44–31	20,229
*Non-conference game; ^{†}Homecoming; Rankings from AP Poll released prior to the game; All times are in Pacific time

== Game summaries ==
=== At Boise State ===
	1	2	3	4	Total
Huskies	0	0	3	10	13
#23 Broncos	6	10	0	0	16

=== Sacramento State ===
	1	2	3	4	Total
Hornets	0	0	0	0	0
Huskies	0	28	21	0	49

=== Utah State ===
	1	2	3	4	Total
Aggies	0	10	0	7	17
Huskies	3	14	14	0	31

=== California ===
	1	2	3	4	Total
Golden Bears	3	17	7	3	30
Huskies	7	0	14	3	24

=== At USC ===
	1	2	3	4	Total
Huskies	0	3	7	7	17
#17 Trojans	3	3	0	6	12

=== Oregon ===
	1	2	3	4	Total
Ducks	6	10	7	3	26
Huskies	0	3	10	7	20

=== At Stanford ===
	1	2	3	4	Total
Huskies	0	0	7	7	14
#10 Cardinal	7	10	14	0	31

=== Arizona ===
	1	2	3	4	Total
Wildcats	3	0	0	0	3
Huskies	7	14	21	7	49

=== Utah ===
	1	2	3	4	Total
#13 Utes	0	24	0	10	34
Huskies	3	10	7	3	23

=== At Arizona State ===
	1	2	3	4	Total
Huskies	10	7	0	0	17
Sun Devils	0	3	7	17	27

=== At Oregon State ===
	1	2	3	4	Total
Huskies	28	17	7	0	52
Beavers	0	0	7	0	7

=== Washington State ===
	1	2	3	4	Total
#20 Cougars	3	0	7	0	10
Huskies	7	10	7	21	45

=== Vs. Southern Miss (Heart of Dallas Bowl) ===
	1	2	3	4	Total
Huskies	14	7	10	13	44
Golden Eagles	7	10	7	7	31

== Postseason ==
=== 2016 NFL draft ===
The 2016 NFL draft was held at Auditorium Theatre in Chicago on April 28 through April 30, 2016. The following Washington players were either selected or signed as free agents following the draft.

Player	Position	Round	Overall pick	NFL team
Travis Feeney	OLB	6th	220	Pittsburgh Steelers
Dwayne Washington	RB	7th	236	Detroit Lions
Marvin Hall	WR	UDFA	—	Oakland Raiders
Cory Littleton	OLB	UDFA	—	Los Angeles Rams
Jaydon Mickens	WR	UDFA	—	Oakland Raiders
Joshua Perkins	TE	UDFA	—	Atlanta Falcons
Taniela Tupou	DT	UDFA	—	Seattle Seahawks
