= 2014 Big 12 Conference football season =

American college football season

- League: NCAA Division I FBS
- Sport: Football
- Duration: August 2014–January 2015
- Teams: 10
- TV partner(s): ABC, ESPN, FOX, FSN, FS1, LHN

2015 NFL Draft
- Top draft pick: Kevin White (West Virginia)
- Picked by: Chicago Bears, 7th overall

Regular season
- Champion: Baylor

Football seasons
- 2013 2015

2014 Big 12 Conference football standings
	Conf.			Overall
Team	W		L	W		L
No. 7 Baylor +	8	–	1	11	–	2
No. 3 TCU +	8	–	1	12	–	1
No. 18 Kansas State	7	–	2	9	–	4
Oklahoma	5	–	4	8	–	5
West Virginia	5	–	4	7	–	6
Texas	5	–	4	6	–	7
Oklahoma State	4	–	5	7	–	6
Texas Tech	2	–	7	4	–	8
Kansas	1	–	8	3	–	9
Iowa State	0	–	9	2	–	10
+ – Conference co-champions; Rankings from AP Poll

The 2014 Big 12 Conference football season was the 19th season of college football player for the Big 12 Conference. It was part of the 2014 NCAA Division I FBS football season.

== Preseason ==
=== Big 12 Media Preseason Poll ===
	Big 12 Media
1.	Oklahoma (47)
2.	Baylor (9)
3.	Kansas State
4.	Texas
5.	Oklahoma State
6.	Texas Tech
7.	TCU
8.	West Virginia
9.	Iowa State
10.	Kansas

() first place votes

=== Preseason All-Big 12 ===
2014 Pre-season Coaches All-Big 12

- Offensive Player of the Year: Bryce Petty, Baylor, QB
- Defensive Player of the Year: Devonte Fields, TCU, DL
- Newcomer of the Year: Tyreek Hill, Oklahoma State, WR

First Team Offense
Position	Player	Class	Team
QB	Bryce Petty	Senior	Baylor
RB	Shock Linwood	Sophomore	Baylor
RB	Malcolm Brown	Senior	Texas
WR	Antwan Goodley	Senior	Baylor
WR	Tyler Lockett	Senior	Kansas State
TE	E. J. Bibbs	Senior	Iowa State
OL	Spencer Drango	Junior	Baylor
OL	Cody Whitehair	Junior	Kansas State
C	BJ Finney	Senior	Kansas State
OL	Daryl Williams	Senior	Oklahoma
OL	Le'Raven Clark	Junior	Texas Tech

First Team Defense
Position	Player	Class	Team
DL	Ryan Mueller	Senior	Kansas State
DL	Devonte Fields	Sophomore	TCU
DL	Chucky Hunter	Senior	TCU
DL	Cedric Reed	Senior	Texas
LB	Bryce Hager	Senior	Baylor
LB	Ben Heeney	Senior	Kansas
LB	Eric Striker	Junior	Oklahoma
DB	Zack Sanchez	Sophomore	Oklahoma
DB	Sam Carter	Senior	TCU
DB	Quandre Diggs	Senior	Texas
DB	Karl Joseph	Junior	West Virginia

First Team Special Teams
Position	Player	Class	Team
K	Michael Hunnicut	Senior	Oklahoma
P	Spencer Roth	Senior	Baylor
KR	Tyler Lockett	Senior	Kansas State
PR	Levi Norwood	Senior	Baylor

== Rankings ==
Legend
	Increase in ranking
	Decrease in ranking
	Not ranked previous week
RV	Received votes but were not ranked in Top 25 of poll

		Pre	Wk 1	Wk 2	Wk 3	Wk 4	Wk 5	Wk 6	Wk 7	Wk 8	Wk 9	Wk 10	Wk 11	Wk 12	Wk 13	Wk 14	Wk 15	Final
Baylor	AP	10	10	8	7	7	7	5	4	12	12	10	6	6	5	5	4	
Baylor	C	10	9	7	6	6	6	3	4	13	12	10	6	6	6	5	5	
Baylor	CFP	Not released									13	12	7	7	7	6	5	
Iowa State	AP																	
Iowa State	C																	
Iowa State	CFP	Not released																
Kansas	AP																	
Kansas	C																	
Kansas	CFP	Not released																
Kansas State	AP	20	20	19	20	25	23	17	14	11	11	9	13	12	11	9	11	
Kansas State	C	21	20	20	20	25	22	16	14	11	11	9	13	11	11	9	10	
Kansas State	CFP	Not released									9	7	13	12	12	9	11	
Oklahoma	AP	4	4	4	4	4	4	11	11	17	18	16	RV	23	20	18	RV	
Oklahoma	C	3	3	3	4	3	3	9	11	18	20	16	24	22	18	16	24	
Oklahoma	CFP	Not released									19	15		21	20	20		
Oklahoma State	AP	RV	RV	RV	25	24	21	16	15	RV	RV							
Oklahoma State	C	RV	RV	RV	RV	RV	23	18	15	RV								
Oklahoma State	CFP	Not released																
TCU	AP	RV	RV	RV	RV	RV	25	9	12	10	10	6	5	5	6	4	6	
TCU	C	RV	RV	RV	RV	RV	25	12	12	10	10	7	5	5	5	4	6	
TCU	CFP	Not released									7	6	4	5	5	3	6	
Texas	AP	RV	RV															
Texas	C	24	25				RV							RV				
Texas	CFP	Not released																
Texas Tech	AP	RV	RV	RV														
Texas Tech	C	RV	RV	RV														
Texas Tech	CFP	Not released																
West Virginia	AP		RV	RV	RV	RV	RV	RV	RV	22	20	24	RV	RV	RV	RV	RV	
West Virginia	C		RV	RV	RV	RV	RV	RV	RV	25	22	25		RV				
West Virginia	CFP	Not released									20	23						

== Head coaches ==
- Art Briles, Baylor
- Paul Rhoads, Iowa State
- Clint Bowen, Kansas interim
- Bill Snyder, Kansas State
- Bob Stoops, Oklahoma
- Mike Gundy, Oklahoma State
- Gary Patterson, TCU
- Charlie Strong, Texas
- Kliff Kingsbury, Texas Tech
- Dana Holgorsen, West Virginia

== Schedule ==
Index to colors and formatting
Big 12 member won
Big 12 member lost
Big 12 teams in **bold**

=== Week one ===
Date	Time	Visiting team	Home team	Site	TV	Result	Attendance	Ref.
August 30	11:00 a.m.	No. 2 (FCS) North Dakota State	**Iowa State**	Jack Trice Stadium • Ames, IA	FS1	**L** 14–34	54,800	
August 30	2:30 p.m.	**West Virginia**	No. 2 Alabama	Georgia Dome • Atlanta, GA (Chick-fil-A Kickoff Game)	ABC	**L** 23–33	70,502	
August 30	6:00 p.m.	Louisiana Tech	No. 4 **Oklahoma**	Gaylord Family Oklahoma Memorial Stadium • Norman, OK	FSN (PPV)	**W** 48–16	85,063	
August 30	6:00 p.m.	Samford	**TCU**	Amon G. Carter Stadium • Fort Worth, TX	FSSW	**W** 48–16	40,094	
August 30	6:00 p.m.	Central Arkansas	**Texas Tech**	Jones AT&T Stadium • Lubbock, TX	FSSW+	**W** 42–35	60,778	
August 30	6:10 p.m.	Stephen F. Austin	No. 20 **Kansas State**	Bill Snyder Family Football Stadium • Manhattan, KS	K-State TV	**W** 55–16	52,830	
August 30	7:00 p.m.	North Texas	**Texas**	Darrell K Royal–Texas Memorial Stadium • Austin, TX	LHN	**W** 38–7	93,201	
August 30	7:00 p.m.	No. 1 Florida State	**Oklahoma State**	AT&T Stadium • Arlingon, TX (Cowboys Classic)	ABC	**L** 31–37	61,521	
August 31	6:30 p.m.	SMU	No. 10 **Baylor**	McLane Stadium • Waco, TX	FS1	**W** 45–0	45,733	
^{#}Rankings from AP Poll released prior to game. All times are in Central Time.

=== Week two ===
Date	Time	Visiting team	Home team	Site	TV	Result	Attendance	Ref.
September 6	11:00 a.m.	No. 4 **Oklahoma**	Tulsa	Chapman Stadium • Tulsa, OK	ABC/ESPN2	**W** 52–7	29,357	
September 6	11:00 a.m.	No. 20 **Kansas State**	**Iowa State**	Jack Trice Stadium • Ames, IA	FS1	**KSU** 32–28	54,800	
September 6	2:30 p.m.	Missouri State	**Oklahoma State**	Boone Pickens Stadium • Stillwater, OK	FSSW	**W** 40–23	51,562	
September 6	6:00 p.m.	SE Missouri State	**Kansas**	Memorial Stadium • Lawrence, KS	JTV	**W** 34–28	36,574	
September 6	6:30 p.m.	BYU	**Texas**	Darrell K Royal–Texas Memorial Stadium • Austin, TX	FS1	**L** 7–41	93,463	
September 6	6:30 p.m.	No. 22 (FCS) Towson	**West Virginia**	Mountaineer Field • Morgantown, WV	ROOT	**W** 54–0	56,414	
September 6	6:30 p.m.	Northwestern State	No. 10 **Baylor**	McLane Stadium • Waco, TX	FSN	**W** 70–6	45,034	
September 6	10:00 p.m.	**Texas Tech**	UTEP	Sun Bowl • El Paso, TX	FS1	**W** 30–26	35,422	
^{#}Rankings from AP Poll released prior to game. All times are in Central Time.

=== Week three ===
Date	Time	Visiting team	Home team	Site	TV	Result	Attendance	Ref.
September 12	7:00 p.m.	No. 8 **Baylor**	Buffalo	University at Buffalo Stadium • Amherst, NY	ESPN	**W** 63–21	24,714	
September 13	11:00 a.m.	**West Virginia**	Maryland	Byrd Stadium • College Park, MD (Rivalry)	BTN	**W** 40–37	48,145	
September 13	2:30 p.m.	**Kansas**	Duke	Wallace Wade Stadium • Durham, NC	FSN	**L** 3–41	25,203	
September 13	2:30 p.m.	Arkansas	**Texas Tech**	Jones AT&T Stadium • Lubbock, TX	ABC	**L** 28–49	60,277	
September 13	2:30 p.m.	**Iowa State**	Iowa	Kinnick Stadium • Iowa City, IA (rivalry)	ESPN	**W** 20–17	70,585	
September 13	3:00 p.m.	Minnesota	**TCU**	Amon G. Carter Stadium • Fort Worth, TX	FS1	**W** 30–7	43,958	
September 13	6:00 p.m.	UTSA	**Oklahoma State**	Boone Pickens Stadium • Stillwater, OK	FSN	**W** 43–13	54,577	
September 13	7:00 p.m.	Tennessee	No. 4 **Oklahoma**	Gaylor Family Oklahoma Memorial Stadium • Norman, OK	ABC	**W** 34–10	85,622	
September 13	7:00 p.m.	**Texas**	No. 12 UCLA	AT&T Stadium • Arlington, TX	FOX	**L** 17–20	60,479	
^{#}Rankings from AP Poll released prior to game. All times are in Central Time.

=== Week four ===
Date	Time	Visiting team	Home team	Site	TV	Result	Attendance	Ref.
September 18	6:30 p.m.	No. 5 Auburn	No. 20 **Kansas State**	Bill Snyder Family Football Stadium • Manhattan, KS	ESPN	**L** 14–20	53,046	
September 20	2:30 p.m.	Central Michigan	**Kansas**	Memorial Stadium • Lawrence, KS	FSN	**W** 24–10	34,882	
September 20	6:30 p.m.	No. 4 **Oklahoma**	**West Virginia**	Mountaineer Field • Morgantown, WV	FOX	**OU** 45–33	61,908	
^{#}Rankings from AP Poll released prior to game. All times are in Central Time.

=== Week five ===
Date	Time	Visiting team	Home team	Site	TV	Result	Attendance	Ref.
September 25	6:30 p.m.	**Texas Tech**	No. 24 **Oklahoma State**	Boone Pickens Stadium • Stillwater, OK	ESPN	**OSU** 45–35	55,958	
September 27	11:00 a.m.	UTEP	No. 25 **Kansas State**	Bill Snyder Family Football Stadium • Manhattan, KS	FSN	**W** 58–28	52,899	
September 27	11:00 a.m.	**TCU**	SMU	Gerald J. Ford Stadium • University Park, TX (Battle for the Iron Skillet)	CBSSN	**W** 56–0	23,093	
September 27	3:00 p.m.	**Texas**	**Kansas**	Memorial Stadium • Lawrence, KS	FS1	**UT** 23–0	36,904	
September 27	7:00 p.m.	No. 7 **Baylor**	**Iowa State**	Jack Trice Stadium • Ames, IA	FOX	**BU** 49–28	51,776	
^{#}Rankings from AP Poll released prior to game. All times are in Central Time.

=== Week six ===
Date	Time	Visiting team	Home team	Site	TV	Result	Attendance	Ref.
October 4	11:30 a.m.	**Iowa State**	No. 21 **Oklahoma State**	Boone Pickens Stadium • Stillwater, OK	FS1	**OSU** 37–20	52,608	
October 4	2:30 p.m.	No. 7 **Baylor**	**Texas**	Darrell K Royal–Texas Memorial Stadium • Austin, TX	ABC	**BU** 28–7	93,727	
October 4	2:30 p.m.	No. 4 **Oklahoma**	No. 25 **TCU**	Amon G. Carter Stadium • Fort Worth, TX	FOX	**TCU** 37–33	47,394	
October 4	3:00 p.m.	**Kansas**	**West Virginia**	Mountaineer Field • Morgantown, WV	FSN	**WVU** 33–14	52,164	
October 4	6:00 p.m.	**Texas Tech**	No. 23 **Kansas State**	Bill Snyder Family Football Stadium • Manhattan, KS	ESPNU	**KSU** 45–13	52,726	
^{#}Rankings from AP Poll released prior to game. All times are in Central Time.

=== Week seven ===
Date	Time	Visiting team	Home team	Site	TV	Result	Attendance	Ref.
October 11	11:00 a.m.	**West Virginia**	**Texas Tech**	Jones AT&T Stadium • Lubbock, TX	FS1	**WVU** 37–34	58,502	
October 11	11:00 a.m.	**Texas**	No. 11 **Oklahoma**	Cotton Bowl • Dallas, TX (Red River Rivalry)	ABC	**OU** 31–26	92,100	
October 11	2:30 p.m.	No. 9 **TCU**	No. 5 **Baylor**	McLane Stadium • Waco, TX (Rivalry)	ABC/ESPN2	**BU** 61–58	46,803	
October 11	2:30 p.m.	Toledo	**Iowa State**	Jack Trice Stadium • Ames, IA	Cyclones.tv	**W** 37–30	52,281	
October 11	3:00 p.m.	No. 16 **Oklahoma State**	**Kansas**	Memorial Stadium • Lawrence, KS	FS1	**OSU** 27–20	31,985	
^{#}Rankings from AP Poll released prior to game. All times are in Central Time.

=== Week eight ===
Date	Time	Visiting team	Home team	Site	TV	Result	Attendance	Ref.
October 18	11:00 a.m.	No. 4 **Baylor**	**West Virginia**	Mountaineer Field • Morgantown, WV	FS1	**WVU** 41–27	60,758	
October 18	11:00 a.m.	No. 14 **Kansas State**	No. 11 **Oklahoma**	Gaylord Family Oklahoma Memorial Stadium • Norman, OK	ESPN	**KSU** 31–30	85,019	
October 18	2:30 p.m.	**Kansas**	**Texas Tech**	Jones AT&T Stadium • Lubbock, TX	FSN	**TTU** 34–21	54,071	
October 18	3:00 p.m.	No. 15 **Oklahoma State**	No. 12 **TCU**	Amon G. Carter Stadium • Fort Worth, TX	FS1	**TCU** 42–9	43,214	
October 18	7:00 p.m.	**Iowa State**	**Texas**	Darrell K Royal–Texas Memorial Stadium • Austin, TX	LHN	**UT** 48–45	92,017	
^{#}Rankings from AP Poll released prior to game. All times are in Central Time.

=== Week nine ===
Date	Time	Visiting team	Home team	Site	TV	Result	Attendance	Ref.
October 25	11:00 a.m.	**Texas**	No. 11 **Kansas State**	Bill Snyder Family Football Stadium • Manhattan, KS	ESPN	**KSU** 23–0	52,879	
October 25	2:30 p.m.	No. 22 **West Virginia**	**Oklahoma State**	Boone Pickens Stadium • Stillwater, OK	ESPN	**WVU** 34–10	59,124	
October 25	2:30 p.m.	**Texas Tech**	No. 10 **TCU**	Amon G. Carter Stadium • Fort Worth, TX (The West Texas Championship)	FOX	**TCU** 82–27	45,122	
^{#}Rankings from AP Poll released prior to game. All times are in Central Time.

=== Week ten ===
Date	Time	Visiting team	Home team	Site	TV	Result	Attendance	Ref.
November 1	11:00 a.m.	No. 19 **Oklahoma**	**Iowa State**	Jack Trice Stadium • Ames, IA	FS1	**OU** 59–14	50,784	
November 1	2:30 p.m.	No. 10 **TCU**	No. 20 **West Virginia**	Mountaineer Field • Morgantown, WV	ABC/ESPN2	**TCU** 31–30	61,190	
November 1	3:00 p.m.	**Kansas**	No. 12 **Baylor**	McLane Stadium • Waco, TX	FS1	**BU** 60–14	47,574	
November 1	6:30 p.m.	**Texas**	**Texas Tech**	Jones AT&T Stadium • Lubbock, TX (Chancellor's Spurs)	FS1	**UT** 34–13	60,961	
November 1	7:00 p.m.	**Oklahoma State**	No. 10 **Kansas State**	Bill Snyder Family Football Stadium • Manhattan, KS	ABC	**KSU** 48–14	53,746	
^{#}Rankings from AP Poll released prior to game. All times are in Central Time.

=== Week eleven ===
Date	Time	Visiting team	Home team	Site	TV	Result	Attendance	Ref.
November 8	11:00 a.m.	No. 10 **Baylor**	No. 16 **Oklahoma**	Gaylor Family Oklahoma Memorial Stadium • Norman, OK	FS1	**BU** 48–14	85,048	
November 8	2:30 p.m.	No. 24 **West Virginia**	**Texas**	Darrell K Royal–Texas Memorial Stadium • Austin, TX	FS1	**UT** 33–16	95,714	
November 8	2:30 p.m.	**Iowa State**	**Kansas**	Memorial Stadium • Lawrence, KS	FSN	**KU** 34–14	33,288	
November 8	6:30 p.m.	No. 9 **Kansas State**	No. 6 **TCU**	Amon G. Carter Stadium • Fort Worth, TX	FOX	**TCU** 41–20	48,012	
^{#}Rankings from AP Poll released prior to game. All times are in Central Time.

=== Week twelve ===
Date	Time	Visiting team	Home team	Site	TV	Result	Attendance	Ref.
November 15	2:00 p.m.	No. 5 **TCU**	**Kansas**	Memorial Stadium • Lawrence, KS	FS1	**TCU** 34–30	30,889	
November 15	2:30 p.m.	**Oklahoma**	**Texas Tech**	Jones AT&T Stadium • Lubbock, TX	ESPN	**OU** 42–30	59,014	
November 15	6:30 p.m.	**Texas**	**Oklahoma State**	Boone Pickens Stadium • Stillwater, OK	FOX	**UT** 28–7	52,495	
^{#}Rankings from AP Poll released prior to game. All times are in Central Time.

=== Week thirteen ===
Date	Time	Visiting team	Home team	Site	TV	Result	Attendance	Ref.
November 20	6:00 p.m.	No. 12 **Kansas State**	**West Virginia**	Mountaineer Field • Morgantown, WV	FS1	**KSU** 26–20	47,683	
November 22	11:00 a.m.	**Kansas**	No. 23 **Oklahoma**	Gaylord Family Oklahoma Memorial Stadium • Norman, OK	FS1	**OU** 44–7	84,908	
November 22	2:30 p.m.	**Texas Tech**	**Iowa State**	Jack Trice Stadium • Ames, IA	FSN	**TTU** 34–31	50,877	
November 22	6:30 p.m.	**Oklahoma State**	No. 6 **Baylor**	McLane Stadium • Waco, TX	FOX	**BU** 49–28	47,179	
^{#}Rankings from AP Poll released prior to game. All times are in Central Time.

=== Week fourteen ===
Date	Time	Visiting team	Home team	Site	TV	Result	Attendance	Ref.
November 27	6:30 p.m.	No. 6 **TCU**	**Texas**	Darrell K Royal–Texas Memorial Stadium • Austin, TX	FS1	**TCU** 48–10	96,496	
November 29	11:00 a.m.	**West Virginia**	**Iowa State**	Jack Trice Stadium • Ames, IA	FS1	**WVU** 37–24	50,059	
November 29	2:30 p.m.	No. 5 **Baylor**	**Texas Tech**	AT&T Stadium • Arlington, TX (Texas Shootout)	ABC/ESPN2	**BU** 48–46	54,179	
November 29	3:00 p.m.	**Kansas**	No. 11 **Kansas State**	Bill Snyder Family Football Stadium • Manhattan, KS (Sunflower Showdown)	FS1	**KSU** 51–13	53,439	
^{#}Rankings from AP Poll released prior to game. All times are in Central Time.

=== Week fifteen ===
Date	Time	Visiting team	Home team	Site	TV	Result	Attendance	Ref.
December 6	11:00 a.m.	**Iowa State**	No. 4 **TCU**	Amon G. Carter Stadium • Fort Worth, TX	ABC	**TCU** 55–3	45,242	
December 6	2:30 p.m.	**Oklahoma State**	No. 18 **Oklahoma**	Gaylord Family Oklahoma Memorial Stadium • Norman, OK (Bedlam Series)	FS1	**OSU** 38–35 ^{OT}	85,312	
December 6	6:45 p.m.	No. 9 **Kansas State**	No. 5 **Baylor**	McLane Stadium • Waco, TX	ESPN	**BU** 38–27	47,934	
^{#}Rankings from AP Poll released prior to game. All times are in Central Time.

=== Bowl games ===
Date	Time	Visiting team	Home team	Site	TV	Result	Attendance	Ref.
December 29	1:00 p.m.	Texas A&M	**West Virginia**	Liberty Bowl Memorial Stadium • Memphis, TN (Liberty Bowl)	ESPN	**L** 37–45	51,282	
December 29	4:30 p.m.	**Oklahoma**	No. 18 Clemson	Orlando Citrus Bowl Stadium • Orlando, FL (Russell Athletic Bowl)	ESPN	**L** 6–40	40,071	
December 29	8:00 p.m.	Arkansas	**Texas**	NRG Stadium • Houston, TX (Texas Bowl)	ESPN	**L** 7–31	71,115	
December 31	11:30 a.m.	No. 9 Ole Miss	No. 6 **TCU**	Georgia Dome • Atlanta, GA (Peach Bowl)	ESPN	**W** 3–42	65,706	
January 1	11:30 a.m.	No. 7 Michigan State	No. 4 **Baylor**	AT&T Stadium • Arlington, TX (Cotton Bowl Classic)	ESPN	**L** 42–41		
January 2	5:45 p.m.	No. 11 **Kansas State**	No. 14 UCLA	Alamodome • San Antonio, TX (Alamo Bowl)	ESPN	**L** 35–40		
January 2	9:15 p.m.	Washington	**Oklahoma State**	Sun Devil Stadium • Tempe, AZ (Cactus Bowl)	ESPN	**W** 30–22		
^{#}Rankings from AP Poll released prior to game. All times are in Central Time.

== Home game attendance ==
Team	Stadium	Capacity	Game 1	Game 2	Game 3	Game 4	Game 5	Game 6	Game 7	Total	Average	% of Capacity
Baylor	McLane Stadium	45,140	45,733	45,034	46,803	47,574	47,683	47,934	—	280,761	46,794	103.7%
Iowa State	Jack Trice Stadium	54,800	54,800	54,800	51,776	52,281	50,784	50,877	50,059	365,377	52,197	95.2%
Kansas	Memorial Stadium	50,071	36,574	34,882	36,904	31,985	33,288	30,889	—	204,522	34,087	68.1%
Kansas State	Bill Snyder Family Stadium	50,000	52,830	53,046	52,899	52,726	52,879	53,746	53,439	371,565	53,081	106.2%
Oklahoma	Gaylord Family Oklahoma Memorial Stadium	82,112	85,063	85,622	85,019	85,048	84,908	85,312	—	510,972	85,162	103.7%
Oklahoma State	Boone Pickens Stadium	60,218	51,562	54,577	55,958	52,608	59,124	52,495	—	326,324	54,387	90.3%
TCU	Amon G. Carter Stadium	45,000	40,094	43,958	47,394	43,214	45,122	48,012	45,242	313,036	44,719	99.4%
Texas	Darrell K Royal–Texas Memorial Stadium	100,119	93,201	93,463	93,727	92,017	95,714	96,496	—	564,618	94,103	94.0%
Texas Tech	Jones AT&T Stadium	60,454	60,778	60,277	58,502	54,071	60,961	59,014	—	354,233	59,039	97.7%
West Virginia	Mountaineer Field	60,000	56,414	61,908	52,726	60,758	61,190	47,683	—	340,679	56,780	94.6%

== All-Big 12 Teams ==
The 2014 Coaches All-Big 12 team. Selections are made by the league's 10 head coaches, who are not permitted to vote for their own players.

=== Individual Honors ===
- Chuck Neinas coach of the Year: Gary Patterson, TCU
- Offensive Player of the Year: Trevone Boykin, TCU, QB
- Defensive Player of the Year: Paul Dawson, TCU, LB
- Offensive Newcomer of the Year: Tyreek Hill, Oklahoma State, ATH
- Defensive Newcomer of the Year: Shaq Riddick, West Virginia, DL
- Offensive Freshman of the Year: Samaje Perine, Oklahoma, RB
- Defensive Freshman of the Year: Kamari Cotton-Moya, Iowa State, DB
- Special Teams Player of the Year: Tyler Lockett, Kansas State, KR/PR
- Co-Offensive Linemen of the Year: Spencer Drango, Baylor, OL & B. J. Finney, Kansas State, OL
- Defensive Lineman of the Year: Emmanuel Ogbah, Oklahoma State, DL

=== First Team Offense ===
Position	Player	Class	Team
QB	Trevone Boykin	Junior	TCU
RB	Shock Linwood	Sophomore	Baylor
RB	Samaje Perine	Freshman	Oklahoma
FB	Glenn Gronkowski	Sophomore	Kansas State
WR	Tyler Lockett	Senior	Kansas State
WR	Sterling Shephard	Junior	Oklahoma
WR	Kevin White	Senior	West Virginia
TE	E. J. Bibbs	Senior	Iowa State
OL	Spencer Drango	Junior	Baylor
OL	B.J. Finney	Senior	Kansas State
OL	Daryl Williams	Senior	Oklahoma
OL	Tyrus Thompson	Senior	Oklahoma
OL	Le'Raven Clark	Junior	Texas Tech

=== First Team Defense ===
Position	Player	Class	Team
DL	Andrew Billings	Sophomore	Baylor
DL	Shawn Oakman	Junior	Baylor
DL	Ryan Mueller	Senior	Kansas State
DL	Emmanuel Ogbah	Sophomore	Oklahoma State
DL	Malcolm Brown	Junior	Texas
LB	Ben Heeney	Senior	Kansas
LB	Eric Striker	Junior	Oklahoma
LB	Paul Dawson	Senior	TCU
DB	JaCorey Shepherd	Senior	Kansas
DB	Randall Evans	Senior	Kansas State
DB	Zack Sanchez	Sophomore	Oklahoma
DB	Chris Hackett	Junior	TCU
DB	Karl Joseph	Junior	West Virginia

=== First Team Special Teams ===
Position	Player	Class	Team
K	Jaden Oberkrom	Junior	TCU
P	Trevor Pardula	Senior	Kansas
KR/PR	Tyler Lockett	Senior	Kansas State

=== Second Team Offense ===
Position	Player	Class	Team
QB	Bryce Petty	Senior	Baylor
QB	Jake Waters	Senior	Kansas State
RB	Aaron Green	Junior	TCU
RB	Malcolm Brown	Senior	Texas
RB	DeAndre Washington	Junior	Texas Tech
FB	Aaron Ripkowski	Senior	Oklahoma
WR	Corey Coleman	Sophomore	Baylor
WR	Curry Sexton	Senior	Kansas State
WR	Josh Doctson	Junior	TCU
TE	Jimmay Mundaine	Senior	Kansas
OL	Cody Whitehair	Senior	Kansas State
OL	Adam Shead	Senior	Oklahoma
OL	Joey Hunt	Junior	TCU
OL	Halapoulivaati Vaitai	Junior	TCU
OL	Mark Glowinski	Senior	West Virginia

=== Second Team Defense ===
Position	Player	Class	Team
DL	Chuka Ndulue	Senior	Oklahoma
DL	Jordan Phillips	Sophomore	Oklahoma
DL	Chucky Hunter	Senior	TCU
DL	Cedric Reed	Senior	Texas
DL	Pete Robertson	Junior	Texas Tech
LB	Bryce Hager	Senior	Baylor
LB	Jonathan Truman	Senior	Kansas State
LB	Jordan Hicks	Senior	Texas
DB	Dante Barnett	Junior	Kansas State
DB	Danzel McDaniel	Junior	Kansas State
DB	Sam Carter	Senior	TCU
DB	Kevin White	Senior	TCU
DB	Quandre Diggs	Senior	Texas

=== Second Team Special Teams ===
Position	Player	Class	Team
K	Josh Lambert	Sophomore	West Virginia
P	Spencer Roth	Senior	Baylor
KR/PR	Tyreek Hill	Junior	Oklahoma State
