= 2014 Washington Huskies football team =

American college football season

2014 Washington Huskies football

Cactus Bowl, L 22–30 vs. Oklahoma State
- Conference: Pac-12 Conference
- North Division
- Record: 8–6 (4–5 Pac-12)
- Head coach: Chris Petersen (1st season)
- Offensive coordinator: Jonathan Smith (1st season)
- Offensive scheme: Single set back
- Defensive coordinator: Pete Kwiatkowski (1st season)
- Base defense: 3–4
- MVPs: Dwayne Washington (offense); Shaq Thompson (defense); Hau'oli Kikaha (defense); Travis Feeney (special teams)
- Captain: Game captains
- Home stadium: Husky Stadium

2014 Pac-12 Conference football standings
	Conf.			Overall
Team	W		L	W		L
North Division
No. 2 Oregon xy$^	8	–	1	13	–	2
Stanford	5	–	4	8	–	5
Washington	4	–	5	8	–	6
California	3	–	6	5	–	7
Oregon State	2	–	7	5	–	7
Washington State	2	–	7	3	–	9
South Division
No. 19 Arizona xy	7	–	2	10	–	4
No. 10 UCLA	6	–	3	10	–	3
No. 12 Arizona State	6	–	3	10	–	3
No. 20 USC	6	–	3	9	–	4
No. 21 Utah	5	–	4	9	–	4
Colorado	0	–	9	2	–	10
Championship: Oregon 51, Arizona 13
^ – College Football Playoff participant; $ – Conference champion; x – Division champion/co-champions; y – Championship game participant; Rankings from AP Poll

The 2014 Washington Huskies football team represented the University of Washington in the 2014 NCAA Division I FBS football season. Their head coach was Chris Petersen, in his first year at UW after eight seasons as head coach at Boise State. Washington was a member of the North Division of the Pac-12 Conference and the Huskies played their home games on campus at Husky Stadium, in the University District of Seattle. They finished the season 8–6, 4–5 in Pac-12 play to finish in third place in the North Division. They were invited to the Cactus Bowl where they lost to Oklahoma State.

== Personnel ==
=== Coaching staff ===
Name	Position	Seasons at Washington	Alma mater
Chris Petersen	Head coach	1st	UC Davis (1988)
Pete Kwiatkowski	Defensive coordinator	1st	Boise State (1990)
Jonathan Smith	Offensive coordinator/quarterbacks	1st	Oregon State (2001)
Bob Gregory	Assistant head coach/linebackers	1st	Washington State (1987)
Chris Strausser	Associate head coach/offensive line	1st	Chico State (1989)
Keith Bhonapha	Running backs/recruiting coordinator	1st	Hawaii (2003)
Jeff Choate	Special teams coordinator/defensive line	1st	Western Montana (1993)
Jimmy Lake	Defensive backs	1st	Eastern Washington (2000)
Jordan Paopao	Tight ends	4th	San Diego (2006)
Brent Pease	Receivers	1st	Montana (1987)

=== Roster ===
2014 Washington Huskies football team roster
Players
Coaches
Offense

Pos.	#	Name	Class
TE	85	David Ajamu	Fr
OL	70	James Atoe	Sr
OL	60	Shane Brostek	Jr
HB	18	Derrick Brown	Jr
TB	24	Jessie Callier	Sr
QB	11	K. J. Carta-Samuels	Fr
OL	76	Dexter Charles	Jr
TB	22	Lavon Coleman	Fr
TB	32	Deontae Cooper	Sr
OL	55	Dane Crane	Fr
OL	78	Mike Criste	Sr
WR	15	Darrell Daniels	So
OL	62	Ross Dolbec	Jr
TB	34	Jomon Dotson	Fr
OL	52	Jake Eldrenkamp	So
OL	69	Cory Fuavai	So
WR	16	Marvin Hall	Jr
TE	84	Michael Hartvigson	Sr
OL	72	Micah Hatchie	Sr
OL	63	Taylor Hindy	So
OL	71	Matt James	Fr
FB	35	Ralph Kinne	Fr
OL	73	Andrew Kirkland	Fr
OL	67	Michael Kneip	So
WR	81	Brayden Lenius	Fr
QB	5	Jeff Lindquist	So
TB	30	Gavin McDaniel	Fr
WR	4	Jaydon Mickens	Jr
QB	10	Cyler Miles	So
WR	86	Taelon Parson	So
TE	82	Joshua Perkins	Jr
WR	87	Dante Pettis	Fr
OL	68	Morgan Richey	Fr
WR	80	Max Richmond	Fr
OL	59	Ben Riva	Sr
WR	1	John Ross III	So
WR	89	Neel Salukhe	So
TE	88	Drew Sample	Fr
OL	79	Coleman Shelton	Fr
OL	75	Jessie Sosebee	Fr
OL	64	Colin Tanigawa	Sr
TB/WR	23	Kendyl Taylor	So
OL	65	Siosifa Tufunga	Jr
OL	74	John Turner	Fr
TB	12	Dwayne Washington	So
WR	2	Kasen Williams	Sr
QB	3	Troy Williams	Fr

Defense

Pos.	#	Name	Class
S	32	Budda Baker	Fr
CB	9	Brandon Beaver	So
LB	25	Keishawn Bierria	Fr
DE	96	Shane Bowman	Fr
DB	40	Aaron Chapman	Fr
CB	35	Brian Clay	Jr
LB	34	Sean Constantine	Fr
DE	98	Will Dissly	Fr
CB	26	Travell Dixon	Sr
LB	54	Ronnie Espedal	Fr
LB	41	Travis Feeney	Jr
DE	95	Jarett Finau	Jr
DT	99	Greg Gaines	Fr
CB	3	Darren Gardenhire	Fr
CB	31	Naijiel Hale	Fr
DE	80	Evan Hudson	Sr
DE	92	Jaylen Johnson	Fr
CB	24	Sidney Jones	Fr
CB	6	Jermaine Kelly	Fr
DE	8	Hau'oli Kikaha	Sr
CB	20	Kevin King	So
DB	37	Jonathan Kwon	Sr
DT	97	Lawrence Lagafuaina	Sr
LB	47	Scott Lawyer	Jr
CB	19	Brandon Lewis	Fr
LB	16	Drew Lewis	Fr
LB	42	Cory Littleton	Jr
DE	5	Joe Mathis	So
DL	58	Kaleb McGary	Fr
S	14	Joseph McIntosh	Fr
S	38	Kyle Nelson	Fr
LB	29	Connor O'Brien	Fr
CB	21	Marcus Peters	Jr
LB	54	Matt Preston	Fr
DT	11	Elijah Qualls	Fr
LB	53	Eric Rauch	Fr
DB	14	Hayden Schuh	So
DL	57	Drew Schultz	Sr
DL	71	Danny Shelton	Sr
DE	22	Josh Shirley	Sr
CB	43	Caleb Taylor	Fr
LB	7	Shaq Thompson	Jr
LB	10	John Timu	Sr
DL	90	Taniela Tupou	Jr
DT	66	Damion Turpin	So
DL	50	Vita Vea	Fr
LB	36	Azeem Victor	Fr
S	39	Thomas Vincent	Jr
S	27	Trevor Walker	So
LB	53	Jake Wambaugh	Fr
S	15	Lavon Washington	Fr
LB	28	Psalm Wooching	So

Special teams

Pos.	#	Name	Class
LS	49	Weston Blackburn	Jr
P	45	Korey Durkee	Jr
LS	51	Luke Hutchinson	Fr
PK	49	Mitch Johnson	So
LS	77	Ryan Masel	Jr
PK	48	Cameron Van Winkle	So
P/PK	43	Tristan Vizcaino	Fr

Head coach

- Chris Petersen
  1st year at Washington
  alma mater: UC Davis

Coordinators/assistant coaches

- Keith Bhonapha
  running backs/recruiting coordinator
  1st year at Washington
  alma mater: Hawaii
- Jeff Choate
  special teams coordinator/defensive line
  1st year at Washington
  alma mater: Western Montana
- Bob Gregory
  assistant head coach/linebackers
  1st year at Washington
  alma mater: Washington State
- Pete Kwiatkowski
  defensive coordinator
  1st year at Washington
  alma mater: Boise State
- Jimmy Lake
  defensive backs
  1st year at Washington
  alma mater: Eastern Washington
- Jordan Paopao
  tight ends
  4th year at Washington
  alma mater: San Diego
- Brent Pease
  receivers
  1st year at Washington
  alma mater: Montana
- Jonathan Smith
  offensive coordinator/quarterbacks
  1st year at Washington
  alma mater: Oregon State
- Chris Strausser
  offensive line
  1st year at Washington
  alma mater: Chico State
- Tim Socha
  strength and conditioning Coach
- Mike McHugh
  director of football operations
- Rich Rasmussen
  director of player personnel
- Gerald Alexander
  graduate assistant
- D'Andre Goodwin
  graduate assistant
- Conor Knowles
  graduate assistant
- Joshua Taufalele
  graduate assistant
- Ben Thienes
  graduate assistant

Legend

- (C) Team captain
- (S) Suspended
- (I) Ineligible
- Injured
- Redshirt

Roster
Last update: October 1, 2013

=== Recruiting class ===
College recruiting
Name	Hometown	School	Height	Weight	Commit date
Budda Baker; Defensive Back	Bellevue, WA	Bellevue High School	5 ft 10 in (1.78 m)	177 lb (80 kg)	Feb 4, 2014
Budda Baker; Defensive Back	Recruit ratings: Scout: Rivals: 247Sports: ESPN:				
K. J. Carta-Samuels; Quarterback	San Jose, CA	Bellarmine Prep	6 ft 3 in (1.91 m)	218 lb (99 kg)	Jan 22, 2014
K. J. Carta-Samuels; Quarterback	Recruit ratings: Scout: Rivals: 247Sports: ESPN:				
Kaleb McGary; Offensive Tackle	Tacoma, WA	Fife High School	6 ft 9 in (2.06 m)	270 lb (120 kg)	Feb 3, 2014
Kaleb McGary; Offensive Tackle	Recruit ratings: Scout: Rivals: 247Sports: ESPN:				
Naijiel Hale; Defensive Back	Bellflower, CA	St. John Bosco High School	5 ft 11 in (1.80 m)	170 lb (77 kg)	Feb 1, 2014
Naijiel Hale; Defensive Back	Recruit ratings: Scout: Rivals: 247Sports: ESPN:				
Shane Bowman; Defensive End	Bellevue, WA	Bellevue High School	6 ft 4 in (1.93 m)	243 lb (110 kg)	Jan 20, 2014
Shane Bowman; Defensive End	Recruit ratings: Scout: Rivals: 247Sports: ESPN:				
Jomon Dotson; Running Back	American Canyon, CA	American Canyon High School	6 ft 0 in (1.83 m)	178 lb (81 kg)	Jan 22, 2014
Jomon Dotson; Running Back	Recruit ratings: Scout: Rivals: 247Sports: ESPN:				
Greg Gaines; Defensive tackle	La Habra, CA	La Habra High School	6 ft 1 in (1.85 m)	290 lb (130 kg)	Jan 19, 2014
Greg Gaines; Defensive tackle	Recruit ratings: Scout: Rivals: 247Sports: ESPN:				
Darren Gardenhire; Safety	Long Beach, CA	Cabrillo High School	6 ft 0 in (1.83 m)	170 lb (77 kg)	Dec 16, 2013
Darren Gardenhire; Safety	Recruit ratings: Scout: Rivals: 247Sports: ESPN:				
Matt James; Offensive Tackle	Coeur d'Alene, ID	Coeur d'Alene High School	6 ft 5 in (1.96 m)	278 lb (126 kg)	Jul 30, 2013
Matt James; Offensive Tackle	Recruit ratings: Scout: Rivals: 247Sports: ESPN:				
Jaylen Johnson; Defensive End	Corona, CA	Centennial High School	6 ft 4 in (1.93 m)	235 lb (107 kg)	Jan 28, 2014
Jaylen Johnson; Defensive End	Recruit ratings: Scout: Rivals: 247Sports: ESPN:				
Sidney Jones; Cornerback	West Covina, CA	West Covina High School	6 ft 1 in (1.85 m)	170 lb (77 kg)	Jan 27, 2014
Sidney Jones; Cornerback	Recruit ratings: Scout: Rivals: 247Sports: ESPN:				
Brayden Lenius; Wide Receiver	West Hills, CA	Chaminade High School	6 ft 5 in (1.96 m)	214 lb (97 kg)	Feb 5, 2014
Brayden Lenius; Wide Receiver	Recruit ratings: Scout: Rivals: 247Sports: ESPN:				
Brandon Lewis; Cornerback	Elk Grove, CA	Pleasant Grove High School	5 ft 11 in (1.80 m)	182 lb (83 kg)	Jan 8, 2014
Brandon Lewis; Cornerback	Recruit ratings: Scout: Rivals: 247Sports: ESPN:				
Drew Lewis; Safety	Sammamish, WA	Eastlake High School	6 ft 3 in (1.91 m)	198 lb (90 kg)	Jun 29, 2013
Drew Lewis; Safety	Recruit ratings: Scout: Rivals: 247Sports: ESPN:				
JoJo McIntosh; Safety	West Hills, CA	Chaminade High School	6 ft 2 in (1.88 m)	189 lb (86 kg)	Dec 17, 2013
JoJo McIntosh; Safety	Recruit ratings: Scout: Rivals: 247Sports: ESPN:				
Dante Pettis; Wide Receiver	San Juan Capistrano, CA	JSerra Catholic High School	6 ft 0 in (1.83 m)	170 lb (77 kg)	Jan 23, 2014
Dante Pettis; Wide Receiver	Recruit ratings: Scout: Rivals: 247Sports: ESPN:				
Lavon Washington; Safety	Oakland, CA	McClymonds High School	5 ft 11 in (1.80 m)	185 lb (84 kg)	Jun 29, 2013
Lavon Washington; Safety	Recruit ratings: Scout: Rivals: 247Sports: ESPN:				
Drew Sample; Tight End	Bellevue, WA	Newport High School	6 ft 5 in (1.96 m)	225 lb (102 kg)	Dec 22, 2013
Drew Sample; Tight End	Recruit ratings: Scout: Rivals: 247Sports: ESPN:				
Jaimie Bryant; Defensive tackle	Olympia, WA	Tumwater High School	6 ft 5 in (1.96 m)	270 lb (120 kg)	Apr 25, 2012
Jaimie Bryant; Defensive tackle	Recruit ratings: Scout: Rivals: 247Sports: ESPN:				
Tristan Vizcaino; Kicker	Chino Hills, CA	Damien High School	6 ft 2 in (1.88 m)	195 lb (88 kg)	Jan 20, 2014
Tristan Vizcaino; Kicker	Recruit ratings: Scout: Rivals: 247Sports: ESPN:				
John Turner; Offensive Tackle	Los Angeles, CA	Loyola High School	6 ft 4 in (1.93 m)	270 lb (120 kg)	Dec 27, 2013
John Turner; Offensive Tackle	Recruit ratings: Scout: Rivals: 247Sports: ESPN:				
Jesse Sosebee; Offensive Tackle	Huntington Beach, CA	Edison High School	6 ft 6 in (1.98 m)	295 lb (134 kg)	Jan 21, 2014
Jesse Sosebee; Offensive Tackle	Recruit ratings: Scout: Rivals: 247Sports: ESPN:				
Will Dissly; Defensive End	Bozeman, MT	Bozeman High School	6 ft 4 in (1.93 m)	240 lb (110 kg)	Jan 26, 2014
Will Dissly; Defensive End	Recruit ratings: Scout: 247Sports: ESPN:				
Devin Burleson; Offensive Tackle	Palmdale, CA	Highland High School	6 ft 7 in (2.01 m)	260 lb (120 kg)	Feb 5, 2014
Devin Burleson; Offensive Tackle	Recruit ratings: Scout: Rivals: 247Sports:				
Overall recruit ranking: Scout: 35 Rivals: 37 247Sports: 37 ESPN: 45
Note: In many cases, Scout, Rivals, 247Sports, On3, and ESPN may conflict in their listings of height and weight.; In these cases, the average was taken. ESPN grades are on a 100-point scale.; Sources: "2014 Team Ranking". Rivals.com.

== Schedule ==
Date	Time	Opponent	Rank	Site	TV	Result	Attendance
August 30	7:30 p.m.	at Hawaii*	No. 25	Aloha Stadium; Halawa, HI	CBSSN	W 17–16	36,411
September 6	12:00 p.m.	No. 2 (FCS) Eastern Washington*		Husky Stadium; Seattle, WA	P12N	W 59–52	62,861
September 13	1:00 p.m.	Illinois*		Husky Stadium; Seattle, WA	FOX	W 44–19	62,325
September 20	3:00 p.m.	Georgia State*		Husky Stadium; Seattle, WA	P12N	W 45–14	64,608
September 27	1:15 p.m.	No. 16 Stanford		Husky Stadium; Seattle, WA	FOX	L 13–20	66,512
October 11	3:00 p.m.	at California		Memorial Stadium; Berkeley, CA	P12N	W 31–7	44,449
October 18	5:00 p.m.	at No. 9 Oregon		Autzen Stadium; Eugene, OR (rivalry)	FS1	L 20–45	57,858
October 25	7:45 p.m.	No. 14 Arizona State^{†}		Husky Stadium; Seattle, WA	ESPN	L 10–24	64,666
November 1	10:00 a.m.	at Colorado		Folsom Field; Boulder, CO	P12N	W 38–23	35,633
November 8	4:00 p.m.	No. 18 UCLA		Husky Stadium; Seattle, WA	FS1	L 30–44	65,547
November 15	12:30 p.m.	at No. 17 Arizona		Arizona Stadium; Tucson, AZ	FOX	L 26–27	47,757
November 22	7:30 p.m.	Oregon State		Husky Stadium; Seattle, WA	P12N	W 37–13	65,036
November 29	7:30 p.m.	at Washington State		Martin Stadium; Pullman, WA (Apple Cup)	FS1	W 31–13	32,952
January 2, 2015	7:15 p.m.	vs. Oklahoma State*		Sun Devil Stadium; Tempe, AZ (Cactus Bowl)	ESPN	L 22–30	35,409
*Non-conference game; ^{†}Homecoming; Rankings from AP Poll released prior to the game; All times are in Pacific time

== Rankings ==
Ranking movements Legend: ██ Increase in ranking ██ Decrease in ranking — = Not ranked RV = Received votes
	Week																
Poll	Pre	1	2	3	4	5	6	7	8	9	10	11	12	13	14	15	Final
AP	25	RV	RV	RV	RV	RV	—	RV	—	—	—	—	—	—	—	—	—
Coaches	25	RV	RV	RV	RV	RV	RV	RV	RV	—	—	—	—	—	—	—	—
CFP	Not released									—	—	—	—	—	—	—	Not released

== Game summaries ==
=== @ Hawaii ===
	1	2	3	4	Total
#25 Huskies	7	10	0	0	17
Rainbow Warriors	10	0	3	3	16

=== Eastern Washington ===
	1	2	3	4	Total
Eagles	14	17	14	7	52
Huskies	24	13	7	15	59

=== Illinois ===
Illinois (2–0) at Washington (2–0)

Team	1	2	3	4	Total
Fighting Illini	3	9	7	0	19
• Huskies	21	17	0	6	44

- Date: September 13
- Location: Husky Stadium, Seattle, WA
- Game start: 4:00 p.m. EST
- Game attendance: 62,325
- Television network: FOX

Scoring summary
Q1	10:16	WASH	Callier 3 yard run (Van Winkle kick)	WASH 7–0
Q1	5:47	ILL	Zalewski 25 yard field goal	WASH 7–3
Q1	5:34	WASH	Ross 75 yard pass from Miles (Van Winkle kick)	WASH 14–3
Q1	4:11	WASH	Thompson 36 yard interception return (Van Winkle kick)	WASH 21–3
Q2	14:53	WASH	Washington 12 yard run (Van Winkle kick)	WASH 28–3
Q2	11:27	ILL	Safety	WASH 28–5
Q2	10:33	WASH	Thompson 52 yard fumble return (Van Winkle kick)	WASH 35–5
Q2	1:17	ILL	Allison 60 yard pass from Lunt (Zalewski kick)	WASH 35–12
Q2	:00	WASH	Van Winkle 20 yard field goal	WASH 38–12
Q3	7:34	ILL	Allison 27 yard pass from Lunt (Zalewski kick)	WASH 38–19
Q4	14:54	WASH	Van Winkle 25 yard field goal	WASH 41–19
Q4	6:21	WASH	Van Winkle 51 yard field goal	WASH 44–19

=== Georgia State ===
	1	2	3	4	Total
Panthers	0	14	0	0	14
Huskies	0	0	21	24	45

=== Stanford ===
	1	2	3	4	Total
Cardinal	3	10	0	7	20
Huskies	0	13	0	0	13

=== @ California ===
	1	2	3	4	Total
Huskies	14	14	0	3	31
Golden Bears	0	0	7	0	7

=== @ Oregon ===
	1	2	3	4	Total
Huskies	6	0	7	7	20
#9 Ducks	7	21	7	10	45

=== Arizona State ===
	1	2	3	4	Total
#14 Sun Devils	0	10	0	14	24
Huskies	0	0	7	3	10

=== @ Colorado ===
	1	2	3	4	Total
Huskies	7	10	14	7	38
Buffaloes	10	10	3	0	23

=== UCLA ===
	1	2	3	4	Total
Bruins	14	17	10	3	44
Huskies	3	7	10	10	30

=== @ Arizona ===
	1	2	3	4	Total
Huskies	7	10	9	0	26
#17 Wildcats	7	14	0	6	27

=== Oregon State ===
	1	2	3	4	Total
Beavers	0	7	6	0	13
Huskies	14	3	6	14	37

=== @ Washington State ===
	1	2	3	4	Total
Huskies	7	7	10	7	31
Cougars	0	0	0	13	13

=== Cactus Bowl ===
	1	2	3	4	Total
Huskies	0	0	14	8	22
Cowboys	14	10	3	3	30

== Notes ==
- February 6, 2014 – Cyler Miles and Damore’ea Stringfellow were suspended indefinitely for violating team rules
