= 2014 Oklahoma State Cowboys football team =

American college football season

2014 Oklahoma State Cowboys football

Cactus Bowl champion

Cactus Bowl, W 30–22 vs. Washington
- Conference: Big 12 Conference
- Record: 7–6 (4–5 Big 12)
- Head coach: Mike Gundy (10th season)
- Offensive coordinator: Mike Yurcich (2nd season)
- Offensive scheme: Air raid
- Defensive coordinator: Glenn Spencer (2nd season)
- Base defense: 4–3
- Home stadium: Boone Pickens Stadium

2014 Big 12 Conference football standings
	Conf.			Overall
Team	W		L	W		L
No. 7 Baylor +	8	–	1	11	–	2
No. 3 TCU +	8	–	1	12	–	1
No. 18 Kansas State	7	–	2	9	–	4
Oklahoma	5	–	4	8	–	5
West Virginia	5	–	4	7	–	6
Texas	5	–	4	6	–	7
Oklahoma State	4	–	5	7	–	6
Texas Tech	2	–	7	4	–	8
Kansas	1	–	8	3	–	9
Iowa State	0	–	9	2	–	10
+ – Conference co-champions; Rankings from AP Poll

The 2014 Oklahoma State Cowboys football team represented Oklahoma State University in the 2014 NCAA Division I FBS football season. The Cowboys were led by tenth-year head coach, Mike Gundy, and played their home games at Boone Pickens Stadium in Stillwater, Oklahoma. They are a charter member of the Big 12 Conference. They finished the season 7–6, 4–5 in Big 12 play to place seventh. They were invited to the Cactus Bowl where they defeated Washington.

== Schedule ==
Date	Time	Opponent	Rank	Site	TV	Result	Attendance
August 30	7:00 p.m.	vs. No. 1 Florida State*		AT&T Stadium; Arlington, TX (Cowboys Classic) (College GameDay)	ABC	L 31–37	61,521
September 6	2:30 p.m.	Missouri State*		Boone Pickens Stadium; Stillwater, OK	FSSW	W 40–23	51,562
September 13	6:00 p.m.	UTSA*		Boone Pickens Stadium; Stillwater, OK	FSN	W 43–13	54,577
September 25	6:30 p.m.	Texas Tech	No. 24	Boone Pickens Stadium; Stillwater, OK	ESPN	W 45–35	55,958
October 4	11:00 a.m.	Iowa State	No. 21	Boone Pickens Stadium; Stillwater, OK	FS1	W 37–20	52,608
October 11	3:00 p.m.	at Kansas	No. 16	Memorial Stadium; Lawrence, KS	FS1	W 27–20	31,985
October 18	3:00 p.m.	at No. 12 TCU	No. 15	Amon G. Carter Stadium; Fort Worth, TX	FS1	L 9–42	43,214
October 25	2:30 p.m.	No. 22 West Virginia^{†}		Boone Pickens Stadium; Stillwater, OK	ESPN	L 10–34	59,124
November 1	7:00 p.m.	at No. 11 Kansas State		Bill Snyder Family Football Stadium; Manhattan, KS	ABC	L 14–48	53,746
November 15	6:30 p.m.	Texas		Boone Pickens Stadium; Stillwater, OK	FOX	L 7–28	52,495
November 22	6:30 p.m.	at No. 5 Baylor		McLane Stadium; Waco, TX	FOX	L 28–49	47,179
December 6	2:30 p.m.	at No. 18 Oklahoma		Gaylord Family Oklahoma Memorial Stadium; Norman, OK (Bedlam Series)	FS1	W 38–35 ^{OT}	85,312
January 2, 2015	7:15 p.m.	vs. Washington*		Sun Devil Stadium; Tempe, AZ (Cactus Bowl)	ESPN	W 30–22	35,409
*Non-conference game; ^{†}Homecoming; Rankings from AP Poll released prior to game; All times are in Central time

== Rankings ==
Ranking movements Legend: ██ Increase in ranking ██ Decrease in ranking — = Not ranked RV = Received votes
	Week																
Poll	Pre	1	2	3	4	5	6	7	8	9	10	11	12	13	14	15	Final
AP	RV	RV	RV	25	24	21	16	15	RV	RV	—	—	—	—	—	—	—
Coaches	RV	RV	RV	RV	RV	23	18	15	RV	—	—	—	—	—	—	—	RV
CFP	Not released									—	—	—	—	—	—	—	Not released

== Game summaries ==
=== Vs. Florida State ===
	1	2	3	4	Total
Cowboys	0	10	7	14	31
#1 Seminoles	10	7	10	10	37

=== Missouri State ===
	1	2	3	4	Total
Bears	6	0	7	10	23
Cowboys	10	17	10	3	40

=== UTSA ===
	1	2	3	4	Total
Roadrunners	3	0	7	3	13
Cowboys	14	10	3	16	43

=== Texas Tech ===
	1	2	3	4	Total
Red Raiders	7	7	14	7	35
#24 Cowboys	7	14	14	10	45

=== Iowa State ===
	1	2	3	4	Total
Cyclones	0	6	7	7	20
#21 Cowboys	0	13	17	7	37

=== Kansas ===
	1	2	3	4	Total
#16 Cowboys	10	10	0	7	27
Jayhawks	7	0	3	10	20

=== TCU ===
	1	2	3	4	Total
#15 Cowboys	3	6	0	0	9
#12 Horned Frogs	21	7	14	0	42

=== West Virginia ===
	1	2	3	4	Total
#22 Mountaineers	14	0	3	17	34
Cowboys	0	10	0	0	10

=== Kansas State ===
	1	2	3	4	Total
Cowboys	7	0	0	7	14
#9 Wildcats	14	7	10	17	48

Oklahoma State started the game with a 5–3 record (3–2 in conference play). The Cowboys had just come off their homecoming loss to West Virginia the previous week. Prior to this game, Oklahoma State led the series 37–23.

Oklahoma State scored in their opening drive by marching down the field and concluding when Tyreek Hill made a 2-yard run for a touchdown. Ben Grogan's kick made the score 7–0 OSU. But the ensuing kick-off by Oklahoma State resulted in Morgan Burns successfully running 86 yards for a touchdown. Matthew McCrane's extra point tied the score 7–7 with 11:36 on the clock in the first quarter. Kansas State's Charles Jones ran in for 6 yards with 4:16 left in the first and Kansas State held the lead for the remainder of the game. Kansas State achieved 36 unanswered points until Ramon Richards made a 38-yard interception for a touchdown after the K-State starters were pulled from the game. With 4:49 left in the game, Matthew McCrane was sent out to make an attempt at a 53-yard field goal. The attempt was good and Kansas State won 48–14.

=== Texas ===
	1	2	3	4	Total
Longhorns					0
Cowboys					0

=== Baylor ===
	1	2	3	4	Total
Cowboys	7	7	0	14	28
#6 Bears	21	7	7	14	49

=== Oklahoma ===
Oklahoma State at #20 Oklahoma

Team	1	2	3	4	OT	Total
• Oklahoma State	7	7	0	21	3	38
Oklahoma	7	21	0	7	0	35

- Date: December 6
- Location: Gaylord Family Oklahoma Memorial Stadium, Norman, OK
- Game start: 2:30 p.m. CST
- TV announcers (FS1): Joe Davis (Play-by-play), Joey Harrington (Color) & Kris Budden (Sideline)

Scoring summary
Q1	12:15	OKLA	Perine 4 yard run (Hunnicutt kick)	OKLA 7–0
Q1	8:32	OKST	Roland 1 yard run (Grogan kick)	Tie 7–7
Q2	11:57	OKLA	Ripkowski 1 yard run (Hunnicutt kick)	OKLA 14–7
Q2	9:24	OKST	Sheperd 39 yard pass from Rudolph (Grogan kick)	Tie 14–14
Q2	6:53	OKLA	Perine 9 yard run (Hunnicutt kick)	OKLA 21–14
Q2	3:09	OKLA	Ripkowski 2 yard pass from Thomas (Hunnicutt kick)	OKLA 28–14
Q4	11:56	OKST	Roland 3 yard run (Grogan kick)	OKLA 28–21
Q4	7:54	OKLA	Ripkowski 1 yard run (Hunnicutt kick)	OKLA 35–21
Q4	4:51	OKST	Sheperd 43 yard pass from Rudolph (Grogan kick)	OKLA 35–28
Q4	:45	OKST	Hill 92 yard punt return (Grogan kick)	Tie 35–35
OT		OKST	Grogan 21 yard field goal	OKST 38–35

=== Cactus Bowl ===
	1	2	3	4	Total
Huskies	0	0	14	8	22
Cowboys	14	10	3	3	30

== Personnel ==
=== Coaching staff ===
Name	Position	Seasons at Oklahoma State	Alma mater
Mike Gundy	Head coach	9	Oklahoma State (1990)
Mike Yurcich	Offensive coordinator/quarterbacks	1	California (PA) (1999)
Bob Connelly	offensive line	1	Texas A&M University-Commerce (1994)
Jemal Singleton	Running Backs	4	Air Force (1999)
Kasey Dunn	Co-Wide Receivers	3	Idaho (1992)
Jason Ray	Co-Wide Receivers	1	Missouri (2007)
Glenn Spencer	Defensive coordinator/linebackers	1	Georgia Tech (1987)
Joe Bob Clements	Defensive line	1	Kansas State (1993)
Tim Duffie	Safeties	1	Texas Tech (1999)
Van Malone	Cornerbacks	2	Texas (1993)
