= 2015 Cactus Bowl =

2015 TicketCity Cactus Bowl
- 26th Cactus Bowl
Washington Huskies	Oklahoma State Cowboys
(8–5)	(6–6)
Pac-12	Big 12
22	30
Head coach: Chris Petersen	Head coach: Mike Gundy
	1	2	3	4	Total
Washington	0	0	14	8	22
Oklahoma State	14	10	3	3	30
- Date: January 2, 2015
- Season: 2014
- Stadium: Sun Devil Stadium
- Location: Tempe, Arizona, U.S.
- MVP: Desmond Roland (RB, Okla. St.) & Seth Jacobs (LB, Okla. St.)
- Favorite: Washington by 6.5
- Referee: Dennis Hennigan (ACC)
- Attendance: 35,409
- Payout: US$million per team

United States TV coverage
- Network: ESPN/ESPN Radio
- Announcers: Dave Flemming, Danny Kanell, & Allison Williams (ESPN); Mark Neely, David Diaz-Infante, & Dave Shore (ESPN Radio)
- Nielsen ratings: TBD

The 2015 Cactus Bowl was an American college football bowl game that was played on January 2, 2015, at Sun Devil Stadium in Tempe, Arizona. It was one of the 2014–15 bowl games that concluded the 2014 FBS football season. The game started at 10:15 p.m. ET and was televised on ESPN. Sponsored by the TicketCity ticket broker company, the game was officially known as the TicketCity Cactus Bowl.

The 26th edition of the Cactus Bowl (although the first edition contested under that name) featured the Oklahoma State Cowboys from the Big 12 Conference and the Washington Huskies from the Pac-12 Conference. Oklahoma State beat Washington by a score of 30–22.

At 45 °F (7 °C), the game featured the coldest kickoff temperature in Cactus Bowl history.

== Teams ==
The game represents the third overall meeting between these two teams, with the series previously tied 1–1. The last time these two teams met was in 1985.

== Game summary ==
=== Scoring summary ===
Scoring summary

Quarter	Time	Drive			Team	Scoring information	Score	
Quarter	Time	Plays	Yards	TOP	Team	Scoring information	WASH	OSU
1	9:53	11	84	5:07	OSU	James Castleman 1-yard touchdown run, Ben Grogan kick good	0	7
1	0:16	7	84	3:31	OSU	James Washington 28-yard touchdown reception from Mason Rudolph, Grogan kick good	0	14
2	9:22	10	47	4:21	OSU	40-yard field goal by Grogan	0	17
2	0:48	2	56	0:31	OSU	Brandon Shepard 47-yard touchdown reception from Rudolph, Grogan kick good	0	24
3	11:48	7	82	3:08	Wash	Jaydon Mickens 31-yard touchdown run, Cameron Van Winkle kick good	7	24
3	1:47	4	5	1:15	OSU	27-yard field goal by Grogan	7	27
3	1:32	–	–	–	Wash	Kickoff returned 96 yards for touchdown by John Ross, Van Winkle kick good	14	27
4	5:54	8	50	3:30	OSU	34-yard field goal by Grogan	14	30
4	3:29	8	67	2:19	Wash	Mickens 16-yard touchdown reception from Cyler Miles, 2-point pass good	22	30
"TOP" = time of possession. For other American football terms, see Glossary of American football.							22	30

=== Statistics ===
Statistics	WASH	OSU
First downs	22	22
Plays–yards	65–369	76–473
Rushes–yards	25–101	49–152
Passing yards	268	321
Passing: Comp–Att–Int	25–40–1	18–27–1
Time of possession	24:15	35:45
