= Travell Dixon =

American football player (born 1991)

No. 27, 30
- Position: Safety

Personal information
- Born: February 17, 1991 (age 35); Miami, Florida, U.S.
- Listed height: 6 ft 1 in (1.85 m)
- Listed weight: 210 lb (95 kg)

Career information
- High school: Miami Norland (Miami Gardens, Florida)
- College: Washington
- NFL draft: 2015: undrafted

Career history
- Oakland Raiders (2015)*; Carolina Panthers (2016); Arizona Cardinals (2018)*; Memphis Express (2019)*
- * Offseason or practice squad member only

Career NFL statistics
- Total tackles: 1
- Stats at Pro Football Reference

Travell Dixon (born February 17, 1991) is an American former professional football player who was a safety in the National Football League (NFL). He was signed by the Oakland Raiders as an undrafted free agent in 2015. He played college football for the Washington Huskies.

== Early life ==
Dixon attended Miami Norland Senior High School where he played just one season of football, leading Miami-Dade County in interceptions (seven). He then attended Eastern Arizona College where he was named All-League and All-Region as a freshman in 2010. In 2011, he recorded 39 tackles and four interceptions. He was named first-team National Junior College Athletic Association (NJCAA) All-American as a sophomore in 2011. He then transferred to the University of Alabama. However, he was unable take to the multiple positions required in the Alabama defense and left the school before the fall semester, citing personal reasons.

After the third game of the 2012 season, prior to the start of the fall academic quarter, Dixon transferred to the University of Washington joining the Huskies. Due to National Collegiate Athletic Association (NCAA) transfer rules, he was required to redshirt the 2012 season. In 2013, he appeared in four games. He recorded eight tackles (six solo), one pass defensed, and one forced fumble. In 2014, he appeared in 12 games (one start). He recorded four tackles (four solo).

== Professional career ==
=== Oakland Raiders ===
After going undrafted in the 2015 NFL draft, Dixon signed with the Oakland Raiders on May 11, 2015. He was waived by the Raiders on May 27.

=== Carolina Panthers ===
On January 6, 2016, Dixon signed a future contract with the Carolina Panthers. On September 3, 2016, he was waived by the Panthers during final roster cuts and was signed to the practice squad the next day. On December 27, 2016, he was promoted to the active roster. He made his professional debut during Week 17 against the Tampa Bay Buccaneers, recording one tackle.

On August 3, 2017, Dixon was waived/injured by the Panthers and placed on injured reserve. He was released on August 10, 2017.

=== Arizona Cardinals ===
On June 11, 2018, Dixon signed with the Arizona Cardinals. He was waived on September 1, 2018.
