= Damore'ea Stringfellow =

American football player (born 1994)

Profile
- Position: Wide receiver

Personal information
- Born: October 18, 1994 (age 32); Perris, California, U.S.
- Listed height: 6 ft 2 in (1.88 m)
- Listed weight: 218 lb (99 kg)

Career information
- High school: Rancho Verde (Moreno Valley, California)
- College: Ole Miss; Washington
- NFL draft: 2017: undrafted

Career history
- Miami Dolphins (2017)*; New York Jets (2017–2018)*; Seattle Seahawks (2018)*; Tennessee Titans (2018)*; Seattle Seahawks (2018)*; Memphis Express (2019); TSL Jousters (2021); Carolina Cobras (2021)
- * Offseason or practice squad member only
- Stats at Pro Football Reference

Damore’ea Denzell Stringfellow (born October 18, 1994) is an American former professional football wide receiver. He played college football at the University of Washington and the University of Mississippi. He signed with the Miami Dolphins as an undrafted free agent in 2017.

== Early life ==
Stringfellow is the son of Kermit Stringfellow and Khalilah Kerl. He attended Rancho Verde High School in Moreno Valley, California, where he played high school football for the Mustangs. In his senior season, he earned first-team All-CIF Southern Section Central Division honors and was named third-team All-State. After a successful high school career, Stringfellow was named as a 2012 Under Armour All-American. He was rated as the 51st best prospect in the country and fourth best recruit in California by ESPN.com, which also ranked him as the sixth best wide receiver in the nation.

== College career ==
Before the 2013 season, Stringfellow committed to play for the University of Washington under then-head coach Steve Sarkisian.

=== Washington ===
In 2013, Stringfellow played in 12 of 13 games and started the last three games of the season. He recorded 20 catches for 259 yards and a touchdown on the year. He had a breakout game in his first collegiate start at UCLA, finishing with eight catches for 147 yards and a touchdown. He had four receptions for 47 yards in the Apple Cup win over Washington State.

Stringfellow was arrested for assault in February 2014. Stringfellow and then teammate Cyler Miles attacked Seattle Seahawks fans following the Super Bowl XLVIII victory over the Denver Broncos. After getting into a fight with a male University of Washington student, Stringfellow then began to intimidate and have an altercation with a female student who had been taking pictures of the incident. "During the struggle, “'Stringfellow hit (her) in the head. (She) fainted, though it appears she was not out for a long period of time (it is unclear whether she passed out from the blow or due to the exertion and the fact she was ill).'” Later in the night, Stringfellow and Miles again approached another man, asked if he was a Seahawks fan and when he replied yes proceeded to assault the fan. When the fan tried to run away, Stringfellow and Miles chased him down and continued to beat him. Stringfellow decided to transfer from the University of Washington shortly after.

=== Ole Miss ===
In 2014, Stringfellow transferred to Ole Miss from Washington in June. As per NCAA transfer rules, Stringfellow had to sit out for the entire year.

==== Sophomore year ====
In 2015, in his first year under head coach Hugh Freeze, Stringfellow played in 12 games with five starts. He finished fifth on the team with 36 catches, fourth with 503 receiving yards, and third with five touchdown catches. He helped the Rebel offense break the majority of single-season school records, including most total yards, points, touchdowns, and passing yards. Stringfellow made his Ole Miss debut against Tennessee-Martin on September 5 and was as a starter at wide receiver and caught two balls for 36 yards against Fresno State on September 12, 2015. He had the best game of his Rebel career with five catches for 84 yards and a pair of touchdowns in the rivalry road win against Mississippi State.

==== Junior year ====
In 2016, Stringfellow played in 12 games, and he posted career bests with 46 receptions for 716 yards and six touchdowns. After the 2016 season, Stringfellow decided to forgo his senior year and enter the 2017 NFL draft. He was not invited to the NFL Combine.

=== Collegiate statistics ===
Damore'ea Stringfellow		Receiving				
Year	School	G	Rec	Yds	Avg	TD
2013	Washington	8	20	259	13.0	1
2015	Ole Miss	12	36	503	14.0	5
2016	Ole Miss	12	46	716	15.6	6
Career	Overall	32	102	1,478	14.5	12

== Professional career ==
=== Miami Dolphins ===
Stringfellow signed with the Miami Dolphins as an undrafted free agent on May 5, 2017. In his first preseason game, he scored on a 99-yard touchdown pass from quarterback David Fales. He was waived by the team on September 2, 2017.

=== New York Jets ===
On September 3, 2017, Stringfellow was claimed off waivers by the New York Jets. He was waived on September 6, 2017, and was re-signed to the practice squad. He signed a reserve/future contract with the Jets on January 1, 2018. He was waived by the Jets on April 27, 2018.

=== Seattle Seahawks ===
On May 7, 2018, Stringfellow signed with the Seattle Seahawks. He was waived on September 1, 2018.

=== Tennessee Titans ===
On September 4, 2018, Stringfellow was signed to the Tennessee Titans' practice squad, but was released two days later.

=== Seattle Seahawks (second stint) ===
On December 12, 2018, Stringfellow was signed to the Seattle Seahawks practice squad, but was released a week later.

=== Memphis Express ===
In 2019, Stringfellow joined the Memphis Express of the Alliance of American Football. He did not return to the team after the first regular season game on February 13, 2019.
