= Jimmy Lake =

American football player and coach (born 1976)

Los Angeles Rams
- Title: Pass game coordinator & defensive backs coach

Personal information
- Born: December 17, 1976 (age 49); Walnut Creek, California, U.S.

Career information
- Position: Safety
- College: Eastern Washington (1995-1998)

Career history
- Eastern Washington (1999-2003); Graduate assistant (1999); Defensive backs coach (2000-2003); Washington (2004) Defensive backs coach; Montana State (2005) Defensive backs coach; Tampa Bay Buccaneers (2006–2007) Assistant defensive backs coach; Detroit Lions (2008) Defensive backs coach; Tampa Bay Buccaneers (2010–2011) Defensive backs coach; Boise State (2012–2013) Defensive backs coach & passing game coordinator; Washington (2014–2021); Defensive backs coach (2014-2015); Co-defensive coordinator & defensive backs coach (2016-2017); Defensive coordinator (2018-2019); Head coach (2020-2021); Los Angeles Rams (2023) Assistant head coach; Atlanta Falcons (2024) Defensive coordinator; Los Angeles Rams (2025-present); Senior defensive assistant (2025); Pass game coordinator & defensive backs coach (2026-present)

Awards and highlights
- 1 Pac-12 North Division (2020)

Head coaching record
- Regular season: NCAA: 7–6 (.538)
- Coaching profile at Pro Football Reference

James Paul Lake (born December 17, 1976) is an American football coach who is a senior defensive assistant for the Los Angeles Rams of the National Football League (NFL). Previously, he was the head coach for the Washington Huskies from 2020 to 2021. Lake has coached at both the National Football League (NFL) and college football levels, primarily overseeing defensive backs. He played college football as a strong safety at Eastern Washington from 1995–1998.

== Early life ==
A military brat, Lake was born in Walnut Creek, California; his father served in the U.S. Air Force and the family lived in various locations, including overseas tours in Turkey and the Philippines. He attended North Central High School in Spokane, Washington, was a three-sport letterman for the Indians (football, basketball, and baseball), and was recognized as a scholar-athlete.

Lake played college football for Eastern Washington University in nearby Cheney as a strong safety from 1995 to 1998, where he was an honorable-mention All-Big Sky recipient, team captain, and named to the All-Big Sky Conference Academic Team. After graduating from Eastern Washington in 1999, Lake worked as a graduate assistant there during the spring before taking a full-time job with the Spokane Indians, a minor league baseball team, where he worked in ticket sales.

== Coaching career ==
Lake returned to coaching for the 2000 season when Eastern Washington hired him as their defensive backs coach, replacing Randy Hanson. Lake stayed at Eastern Washington until 2004 when the University of Washington, located in Seattle, hired him as defensive backs coach. The job change moved him to the western side of the state for the first time and up to the Football Bowl Subdivision (then called Division I-A). At Washington, he coached under defensive coordinator Phil Snow, who Lake called a "defensive back guru." The Huskies won a single game in 2004, leading to the dismissal of head coach Keith Gilbertson and his staff. Lake landed at Montana State University in Bozeman, Montana, under defensive coordinator Pete Kwiatkowski and head coach Mike Kramer, both of whom had been at Eastern Washington during Lake's playing days.

Following the 2005 season, Lake interviewed with Washington before accepting a job with the Tampa Bay Buccaneers in the National Football League as assistant defensive backs coach, working with defensive coordinator Monte Kiffin under head coach Jon Gruden. Lake left after two years to coach defensive backs with the Detroit Lions, one of several Bucs assistants hired away by head coach Rod Marinelli, a long-time defensive line coach at Tampa Bay. The move reunited him with Snow, who had been in Detroit for several years coaching the linebackers. The 2008 Detroit Lions infamously went winless, the first NFL team to do so since the season expanded to 16 games, leading to the dismissal of Marinelli and his staff.

Lake returned to Tampa Bay for the 2010 and 2011 seasons as defensive backs coach under Raheem Morris, who had replaced Gruden as head coach in 2009.

=== Boise State ===
In 2012 and 2013 Lake worked as the defensive backs coach for Boise State.

=== Washington ===
Lake joined the Washington Huskies staff in 2014 as a defensive backs coach under head coach Chris Petersen. This was his second stint at the school after serving one year under Keith Gilbertson in 2004. In 2016, he was promoted to co-defensive coordinator. On December 2, 2019, Petersen announced he would step down as Washington's head coach at the end of the 2019 season, and Lake would be his successor. Washington suspended Lake without pay on November 8, 2021, after he tried to separate a player from a sideline scrum by hitting him in the facemask, then shoving him in the back as he tried to walk away, the previous weekend. Washington fired Lake on November 14. Washington did not choose to fire him for cause, and will pay his $9.9 million buyout. Defensive coordinator Bob Gregory replaced Lake as interim head coach. Lake's tenure as Washington's head coach was tumultuous and full of issues both on and off the field.

=== Los Angeles Rams (first stint) ===
On February 16, 2023, Lake was hired as assistant head coach by the Los Angeles Rams.

=== Atlanta Falcons ===
On January 29, 2024, Lake was hired to be the defensive coordinator for the Atlanta Falcons. Lake followed head coach Raheem Morris to Atlanta having served on staff with him both with the Tampa Bay Buccaneers and the Los Angeles Rams. On January 11, 2025, the Falcons announced that they had fired Lake after one season.

=== Los Angeles Rams (second stint) ===
On February 25, 2025, Lake's return to the Rams was announced with the job title of senior defensive assistant.

== Head coaching record ==
Year	Team	Overall	Conference	Standing	Bowl/playoffs	Coaches^{#}	AP^{°}
Washington Huskies (Pac-12 Conference) (2020–2021)
2020	Washington	3–1	3–1	1st (North) (Note: Washington was unable to play in the 2020 Pac-12 Championship game due to an outbreak of COVID-19 within the team.)			
2021	Washington	4–5 (Note: Washington suspended Lake after nine games and fired him the following week.)	3–3	5th (North)			
Washington:		7–6	6–4				
Total:		7–6					
National championship Conference title Conference division title or championship game berth
^{†}Indicates CFP / New Years' Six bowl.; ^{#}Rankings from final Coaches Poll.; ^{°}Rankings from final AP Poll.
