= Budda Baker =

American football player (born 1996)

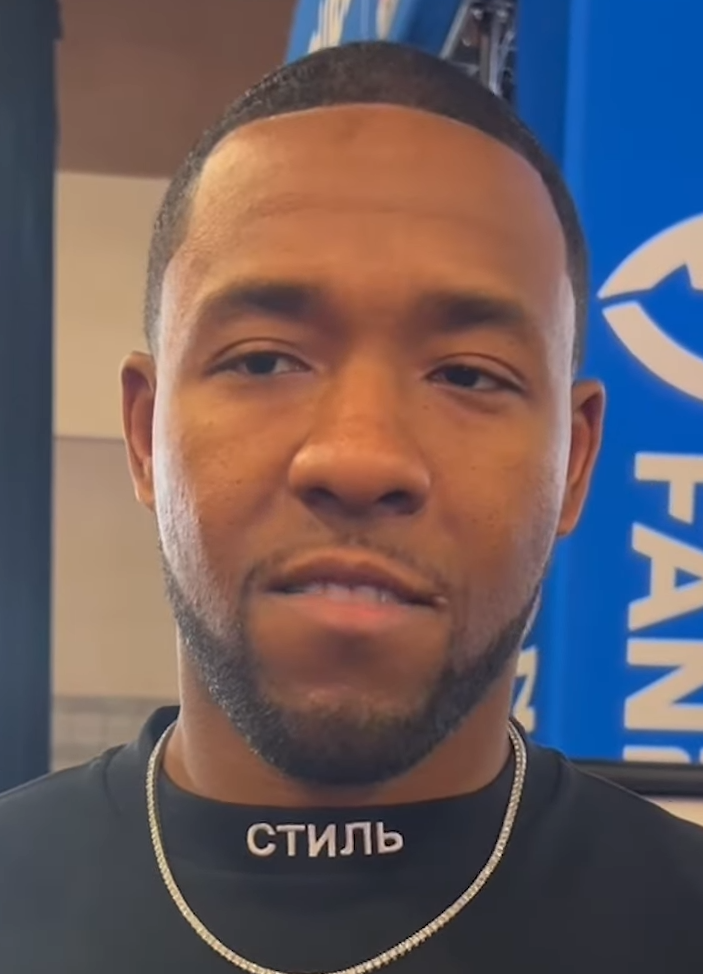
- Baker in 2023

No. 3 – Arizona Cardinals
- Position: Strong safety
- Roster status: Active

Personal information
- Born: January 10, 1996 (age 30); Bellevue, Washington, U.S.
- Listed height: 5 ft 10 in (1.78 m)
- Listed weight: 195 lb (88 kg)

Career information
- High school: Bellevue
- College: Washington (2014–2016)
- NFL draft: 2017: 2nd round, 36th overall pick

Career history
- Arizona Cardinals (2017–present)

Awards and highlights
- 2× First-team All-Pro (2017, 2020); 2× Second-team All-Pro (2021, 2024); 8× Pro Bowl (2017, 2019–2025); NFL solo tackles leader (2019); PFWA All-Rookie Team (2017); Consensus All-American (2016); 2× First-team All-Pac-12 (2015, 2016)

Career NFL statistics as of Week 10, 2026
- Total tackles: 1,089
- Sacks: 13.5
- Forced fumbles: 8
- Fumble recoveries: 6
- Pass deflections: 48
- Interceptions: 9
- Defensive touchdowns: 1
- Stats at Pro Football Reference

Bishard "Budda" Baker (born January 10, 1996) is an American professional football strong safety for the Arizona Cardinals of the National Football League (NFL). He played college football for the Washington Huskies, and was selected by the Cardinals in the second round of the 2017 NFL draft. Baker is an eight-time Pro Bowler and a four-time All-Pro member.

== Early life ==
Baker's mother started calling him Budda as a baby since she thought he looked like a Buddha doll. Baker attended Bellevue High School in Bellevue, Washington. He played safety and running back in football, and also ran track. As a senior, he was named the Seattle Times High School Athlete of the Year. Baker was rated as a four-star recruit and was ranked among the top safeties in his class. He originally committed to the University of Oregon to play college football, but flipped to the University of Washington the night before National Signing Day.

== College career ==
As a true freshman at Washington in 2014, Baker started all 14 games, recording 80 tackles, one interception, and one sack. Following his freshman campaign, Baker was named a Freshman All-American by USA Today. As a sophomore in 2015 he started 12 of 13 games and was named All-Pac-12 Conference after recording 49 tackles and two interceptions. Baker was named a pre-season All-American prior to the 2016 season. Following the 2016 season, Baker earned consensus all-American honors as a result of being named a first-team all-American by The Sporting News and the Football Writers Association of America, and a second-team all-American by the American Football Coaches Association and The Associated Press. On January 3, 2017, Baker announced his decision to forgo his senior season and enter the 2017 NFL draft.

== Professional career ==
=== Pre-draft ===
Baker attended the NFL Combine and completed all of the combine and positional drills. He participated at Washington's Pro Day and only ran positional drills for over 50 NFL team representatives and scouts. The majority of NFL draft experts and analysts projected Baker to be a second round pick. Teams were impressed by his performance but were concerned his lack of size could affect his ability to play in the NFL. He was ranked the top nickelback available in the draft by NFL analyst Mike Mayock, was ranked the second best free safety prospect by NFLDraftScout.com, and the fourth best safety in the draft by Sports Illustrated and ESPN.

External videos
- Budda Baker's NFL Combine Workout

Pre-draft measurables
Height	Weight	Arm length	Hand span	Wingspan	40-yard dash	10-yard split	20-yard split	20-yard shuttle	Three-cone drill	Vertical jump	Broad jump	Bench press	Wonderlic
5 ft 9 5/8 in (1.77 m)	195 lb (88 kg)	30 3/4 in (0.78 m)	9 in (0.23 m)	5 ft 11 3/4 in (1.82 m)	4.45 s	1.52 s	2.59 s	4.08 s	6.76 s	32.5 in (0.83 m)	9 ft 7 in (2.92 m)	15 reps	14
All values from NFL Combine

=== 2017 ===
The Arizona Cardinals selected Baker in the second round (36th overall) of the 2017 NFL draft. The Cardinals traded their 2017 second-round (45th overall), fourth-round (119th overall), and seventh-round (197th overall) picks to the Chicago Bears in return for the 36th overall pick to draft Baker and also received a seventh-round pick (221st overall). He was the fourth safety selected in 2017 and one of three Washington defensive backs selected, along with Kevin King and Sidney Jones.

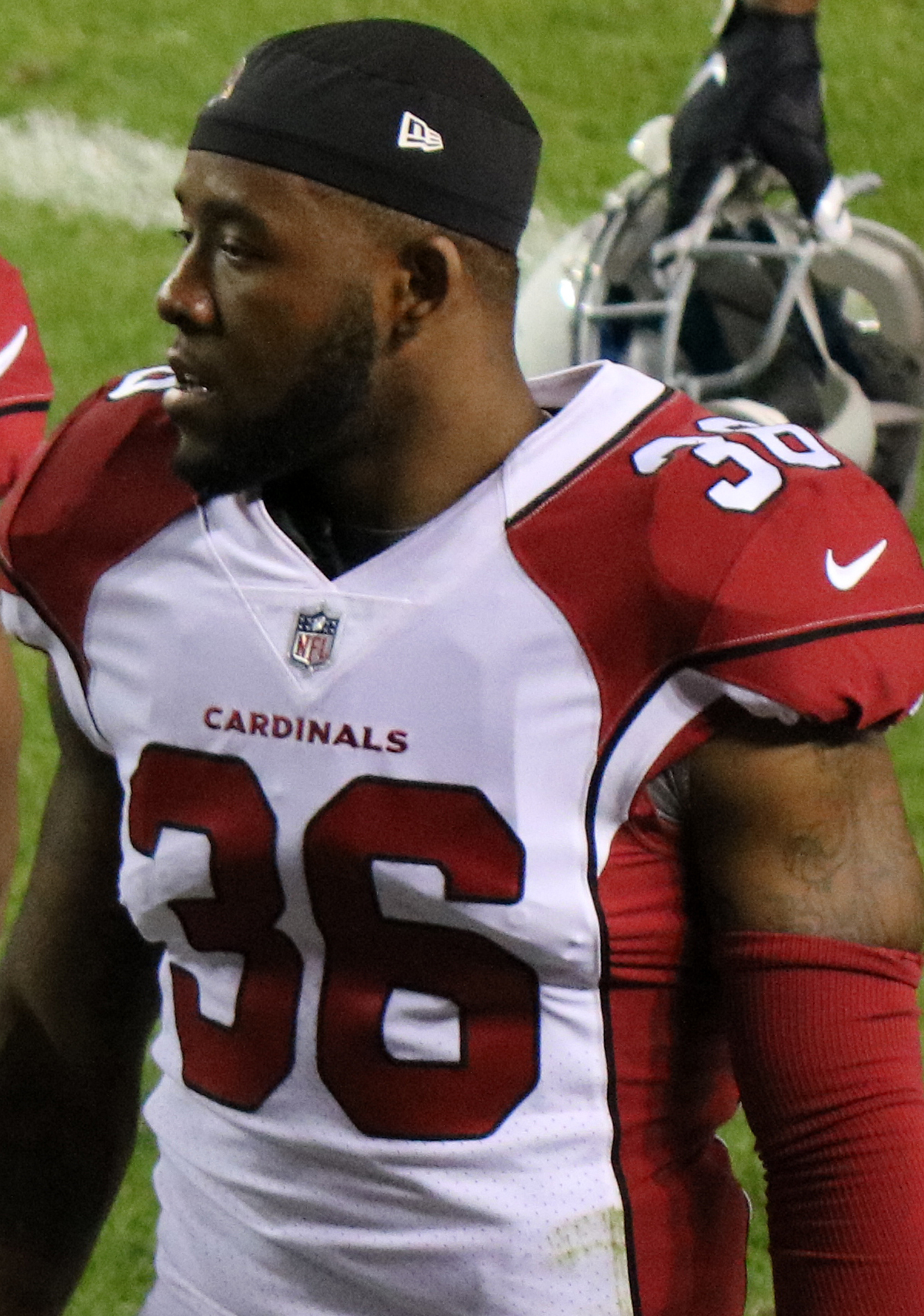
Baker playing for the Cardinals in his rookie season.

On May 25, 2017, the Cardinals signed Baker to a four–year, $6.83 million rookie contract that included $3.88 million guaranteed and an initial signing bonus of $3.10 million.

Due to NFL's rules for colleges who follow quarters systems, Baker was unable to attend organized team activities or minicamp until the University of Washington's graduation day. He impressed coaches throughout training camp and was named the backup free safety to Tyrann Mathieu to begin the regular season.

He made his professional regular season debut in the Cardinals' season-opener at the Detroit Lions and made one tackle in their 35–23 loss. On November 19, 2017, Baker earned his first career start after Tyvon Branch suffered a torn ACL the previous week. In his first career start, he collected a season-high 13 combined tackles (11 solo), deflected two passes, and made his first career sack during a 31–21 loss at the Houston Texans in Week 11. On December 19, 2017, Baker was one of four Cardinals named to the 2018 Pro Bowl as a special teamer. In Week 16, he tied his season-high of 13 combined tackles (eight solo) and broke up a pass in the Cardinals' 23–0 victory against the New York Giants. He finished his rookie season in 2017 with 74 combined tackles (58 solo) and seven pass deflections in 16 games and seven starts. He was named to the Pro Bowl and earned first team All-Pro honors as a rookie. He was named to the PFWA All-Rookie Team.

=== 2018 ===
On January 1, 2018, head coach Bruce Arians announced his retirement. On January 22, 2018, the Arizona Cardinals announced their decision to hire Carolina Panthers' defensive coordinator Steve Wilks as their head coach. Throughout training camp, Baker competed to be the starting strong safety against Tre Boston under new defensive coordinator Al Holcomb. Head coach Steve Wilks named Baker the starting strong safety to begin the regular season, alongside free safety Antoine Bethea. He was also named the first-team nickelback with Tre Boston taking over at strong safety in packages requiring five defensive backs.

In Week 5, Baker collected a season-high 16 combined tackles (11 solo), deflected a pass, and made a sack during a 28–18 win at the San Francisco 49ers. On October 14, 2018, Baker recorded 11 combined tackles (9 solo) and returned a fumble recovery that Chandler Jones forced during a sack of Kirk Cousins 36–yards to score the first touchdown of his career during a 27–17 loss at the Minnesota Vikings. He was inactive for 2 games (Weeks 11–12) due to a knee injury. He finished the season second on the team with a total of 102 combined tackles (77 solo), two sacks, one pass deflection, two fumble recoveries, one forced fumble, and a touchdown in 14 games and 13 starts.

=== 2019 ===
On January 8, 2019, the Arizona Cardinals hired Kliff Kingsbury to be their new head coach. Baker returned to training camp slated as the starting free safety under new defensive coordinator Vance Joseph. He chose to change his jersey number from No. 36 to No. 32, which he had worn during his collegiate career. Upon joining the Cardinals in 2017, No. 32 was unavailable as it was work by Tyrann Mathieu. He was named the starting free safety to begin the season and was paired with strong safety D. J. Swearinger.

On October 27, 2019, Baker set a season-high for tackles with 14 combined tackles (7 solo) during a 9–31 loss at the New Orleans Saints. The following game, Baker recorded 14 combined tackles (11 solo) and set a career-high with 4 pass deflections as the Cardinals lost 25–28 to the San Francisco 49ers in Week 9. He started a 16 games throughout the 2019 NFL season and finished with a total of 147 combined tackles (104 solo), 6 passes defended, 1 forced fumble, a fumble recovery, and was credited with half a sack in 16 games and starts. He led the NFL in solo tackles. He was named to his second Pro Bowl. He was ranked 97th by his fellow players on the NFL Top 100 Players of 2020.

=== 2020 ===
On August 25, 2020, the Arizona Cardinals signed Baker to a four–year, $59 million contract extension that included $33.10 million guaranteed, $22.10 million guaranteed upon signing, and also stipulated an initial signing bonus of $10 million. This deal made him the highest-paid safety in NFL history at the time. He entered training camp slated as the de facto starting free safety. Head coach Kliff Kingsbury named him the starting free safety to begin the season and paired him with Jalen Thompson.

On September 10, 2020, Baker started in the Cardinals' season-opener at the San Francisco 49ers and set a season-high with 15 combined tackles (10 solo) as they won 24–20. He was inactive for the Cardinals' 21–31 loss at the Carolina Panthers in Week 4 due to an injury to his thumb. On October 19, 2020, Baker recorded seven solo tackles, made one pass deflection, forced a fumble by running back Ezekiel Elliott, made one sack, and had his first career interception on a pass thrown by Andy Dalton to wide receiver Amari Cooper during a 38–10 victory at the Dallas Cowboys on Monday Night Football. His performance earned him the National Football Conference (NFC) Defensive Player of the Week. In Week 7, he recorded 14 combined tackles (11 solo), broke up a pass, and intercepted a pass by Russell Wilson and returned it for a career-best 90–yards before being tackled by DK Metcalf before crossing into the endzone during a 37–34 overtime win against the Seattle Seahawks on Sunday Night Football. He was named the NFC Defensive Player of the Month for October after tallying 31 combined tackles (26 solo), two sacks, two interceptions, and a forced fumble although he only appeared in three of the four games. He finished the 2020 NFL season with a total of 118 combined tackles (90 solo), six pass deflections, two interceptions, two sacks, and one forced fumble in 15 games and 15 starts. He earned his third Pro Bowl and second first team All-Pro nomination. He was ranked 19th by his fellow players on the NFL Top 100 Players of 2021.

=== 2021 ===
On May 3, 2021, it was announced that Baker chose to change his jersey number for the third time in his career from No. 32 to No. 3. This was due to the NFL expanding the jersey numbers after changing the set rules prior to the 2021 NFL season. He returned as the starting free safety to begin the season, alongside Jalen Thompson.

In Week 5, Baker recorded six combined tackles (five solo), made one pass deflection, and had the first career interception thrown by rookie Trey Lance on the opening drive during a 17–10 victory against the San Francisco 49ers. On November 7, 2021, he made 7 combined tackles (2 solo), 1 pass deflection, and secured the Cardinals' 31–17 victory at the San Francisco 49ers by intercepting a pass by Jimmy Garoppolo to wide receiver Deebo Samuel with 3:10 remaining. On December 5, 2021, Baker recorded 6 combined tackles (4 solo), broke up a pass, and set a career-high with his third interception of the season on a pass by Andy Dalton to tight end Cole Kmet during a 33–22 victory at the Chicago Bears. In Week 16, he set a season-high with 13 combined tackles (7 solo), recorded one pass deflection, and a sack as the Cardinals lost 16–22 against the Indianapolis Colts. He started all 17 games for the first time in his career and finished with a total of 98 combined tackles (72 solo), 7 pass deflections, a career-high 3 interceptions, and 2 sacks. He earned a third consecutive and fourth overall Pro Bowl nomination. He was ranked 67th by his fellow players on the NFL Top 100 Players of 2022.

=== 2022 ===
He entered training camp as the starting strong safety, after defensive coordinator Vance Joseph chose to switch Jalen Thompson to free safety. On September 11, 2022, Baker started in the Arizona Cardinals' home-opener against the Kansas City Chiefs and set a season-high with 13 combined tackles (seven solo) as they lost 21–44. In Week 10, he recorded four combined tackles (three solo), made one pass deflection, and secured a 27–17 victory at the Los Angeles Rams by intercepting a pass by John Wolford to wide receiver Ben Skowronek with 5:49 remaining in the fourth quarter. In Week 15, he recorded seven combined tackles (five solo), set a season-high with two pass deflections, and intercepted a pass by Brett Rypien to wide receiver Eric Saubert during a 15–24 loss at the Denver Broncos. In Week 16, Baker recorded nine combined tackles (six solo) and made a pass deflection before exiting the 16–19 overtime loss against the Tampa Bay Buccaneers late in the fourth quarter due to an injury. On December 28, 2022, the Cardinals officially placed him on injured reserve for the last two games (Weeks 17–18) after he suffered a fractured shoulder. He finished with 111 combined tackles, two interceptions, seven passes defended, and one forced fumble. He earned his fourth consecutive and fifth nomination to the Pro Bowl. He was ranked 73rd by his fellow players on the NFL Top 100 Players of 2023.

=== 2023 ===
On February 14, 2023, the Arizona Cardinals hired Jonathan Gannon to be their new head coach after firing Kliff Kingsbury. Their new defensive coordinator Nick Rallis chose to retain Baker and Jalen Thompson as the starting safeties to begin the season.

On September 15, 2023, Baker suffered a hamstring injury during practice and remained inactive during a 28–31 loss to the New York Giants in Week 2. On September 18, 2023, the Cardinals officially placed Baker on injured reserve due to his hamstring injury and he remained inactive for the next four games (Weeks 3–6). On October 21, 2023, he was activated from injured reserve and added back to their active roster. In Week 18, he set a season-high with ten combined tackles (eight solo) during a 20–21 loss against the Seattle Seahawks. He finished the 2023 NFL season with a total of 87 combined tackles (58 solo) in 12 games and 12 starts. He earned a sixth Pro Bowl nomination. He was ranked 89th by his fellow players on the NFL Top 100 Players of 2024.

=== 2024 ===
On December 17, 2024, the Arizona Cardinals signed Baker to a three–year, $54 million contract extension that includes $29.36 million guaranteed, $17.44 million guaranteed upon signing, and an initial signing bonus of $12.24 million. He will remain under contract with the Cardinals through the 2027 season. He returned to training camp as the de facto starting strong safety. Head coach Jonathan Gannon named him the starting strong safety to begin the season and paired him with Jalen Thompson. On December 8, 2024, he set a career-high with 18 combined tackles (8 solo) as the Cardinals lost 18–30 against the Seattle Seahawks. In Week 17, he recorded 7 combined tackles (1 solo) and set a season-high with two pass deflections during a 9–13 loss at the Los Angeles Rams. He started all 17 games during the 2024 NFL season and finished with a career-high 164 combined tackles (95 solo), five passes defended, two sacks, and one forced fumble. He finished second in the NFL in combined tackles. He earned a seventh Pro Bowl nomination. He received an overall grade of 77.8 from Pro Football Focus, which ranked 16th amongst 171 qualifying safeties in 2024. Baker was ranked 34th by his fellow players on the NFL Top 100 Players of 2025.

=== 2025 ===
In the 2025 season, Baker finished with 120 total tackles (57 solo), one interception, five passes defended, and one fumble recovery. Baker earned his eighth Pro Bowl selection in 2025 and recorded his 1,000th career tackle during the season. He was also the recipient of the Art Rooney Award.

== Career statistics ==
Legend
	Led the NFL
**Bold**	Career high

=== NFL ===
Year	Team	Games		Tackles				Interceptions						Fumbles		
Year	Team	GP	GS	Cmb	Solo	Ast	Sck	PD	Int	Yds	Avg	Lng	TD	FF	FR	TD
2017	ARI	16	7	74	58	16	1.0	**7**	0	0	0.0	0	0	**2**	1	0
2018	ARI	14	13	102	78	24	2.0	1	0	0	0.0	0	0	1	**2**	**1**
2019	ARI	16	16	147	**104**	43	0.5	6	0	0	0.0	0	0	1	1	0
2020	ARI	15	15	118	90	28	2.0	6	2	90	**45.0**	**90**	0	1	0	0
2021	ARI	17	17	98	63	35	2.0	**7**	**3**	**101**	34.0	77	0	0	1	0
2022	ARI	15	15	111	75	36	0.0	**7**	2	54	27.0	53	0	1	0	0
2023	ARI	12	12	87	58	29	0.0	0	0	0	0.0	0	0	0	0	0
2024	ARI	17	17	**164**	95	**69**	2.0	5	0	0	0.0	0	0	1	0	0
2025	ARI	16	16	120	57	63	0.5	5	1	0	0.0	0	0	0	1	0
2026	ARI	10	10	68	31	37	**3.5**	4	1	15	15.0	15	0	1	0	0
Career		148	138	1,089	709	380	13.5	48	9	260	28.9	90	0	8	6	1

=== College ===
Season	Team	Conf	Class	Pos	GP	Tackles					Interceptions					Fumbles	
Season	Team	Conf	Class	Pos	GP	Solo	Ast	Cmb	TfL	Sck	Int	Yds	Avg	TD	PD	FR	FF
2014	Washington	Pac-12	FR	DB	14	**58**	**22**	**80**	2.0	1.0	1	**44**	**44.0**	0	6	0	**2**
2015	Washington	Pac-12	SO	DB	11	32	17	49	1.5	0.0	**2**	0	0.0	0	**7**	0	0
2016	Washington	Pac-12	JR	DB	14	48	**22**	70	**9.5**	**3.0**	**2**	18	9.0	0	5	0	1
Career						138	61	199	13.0	4.0	5	62	12.4	0	18	0	3

== Personal life ==
Baker's older brother, Robert, died in 2018 after being shot in the Ballard neighborhood of Seattle.
