= 2013 Washington Huskies football team =

American college football season

2013 Washington Huskies football

Fight Hunger Bowl champion

Fight Hunger Bowl, W 31–16 vs. BYU
- Conference: Pac-12 Conference
- North Division

Ranking
- AP: No. 25
- Record: 9–4 (5–4 Pac-12)
- Head coach: Steve Sarkisian (5th season; regular season); Marques Tuiasosopo (interim; bowl game)
- Offensive coordinator: Eric Kiesau (2nd season)
- Offensive scheme: Spread
- Defensive coordinator: Justin Wilcox (2nd season)
- Base defense: 3–4
- Captains: Hau'oli Kikaha; Sean Parker; Keith Price; Bishop Sankey; Colin Tanigawa; John Timu
- Home stadium: Husky Stadium

2013 Pac-12 Conference football standings
	Conf.			Overall
Team	W		L	W		L
North Division
No. 11 Stanford xy$	7	–	2	11	–	3
No. 9 Oregon x	7	–	2	11	–	2
No. 25 Washington	5	–	4	9	–	4
Oregon State	4	–	5	7	–	6
Washington State	4	–	5	6	–	7
California	0	–	9	1	–	11
South Division
No. 21 Arizona State xy	8	–	1	10	–	4
No. 16 UCLA	6	–	3	10	–	3
No. 19 USC	6	–	3	10	–	4
Arizona	4	–	5	8	–	5
Utah	2	–	7	5	–	7
Colorado	1	–	8	4	–	8
Championship: Stanford 38, Arizona State 14
$ – BCS representative as conference champion; x – Division champion/co-champions; y – Championship game participant; Rankings from AP Poll

The 2013 Washington Huskies football team represented the University of Washington in the 2013 NCAA Division I FBS football season. The team, coached by fifth-year head coach Steve Sarkisian, was a member of the North Division of the Pac-12 Conference. Sarkisian left the team to become the head coach at USC following the Apple Cup. The team was led by quarterbacks coach Marques Tuiasosopo following Sarkisian's departure. The Huskies played their home games at their on-campus home of Husky Stadium.

== Offseason ==
Former Husky Marques Tuiasosopo was hired in January as the new quarterbacks coach. The offseason saw some attrition with the losses of fullback Cooper Pelluer, safety Evan Zeger, receivers James Johnson and Jamaal Jones, running back Erich Wilson II, and defensive back Darien Washington for various reasons. Running backs coach Joel Thomas left to coach the same position at Arkansas. The offseason also included legal troubles for tight end Austin Seferian-Jenkins and receiver Kasen Williams. Seferian-Jenkins was charged with DUI and served one day in jail as part of his sentencing agreement. Williams was also charged with DUI in a separate incident for which he paid a fine. Construction on Husky Stadium entered the final stages and the team was able to break it in with the start of fall camp in August.

== Weekly starters ==
The following players were the weekly offensive and defensive game starters.

Opponent	WR	LT	LG	C	RG	RT	QB	TB	TE	WR	WR
#19 Boise State	Williams	Hatchie	Charles	Criste	Tanigawa	Riva	Price	Sankey	Hartvigson	Mickens	Smith
Illinois	Williams	Hatchie	Charles	Criste	Tanigawa	Riva	Price	Sankey	Seferian-Jenkins	Mickens	Smith
Idaho State	Williams	Hatchie	Charles	Criste	Tanigawa	Riva	Price	Sankey	Seferian-Jenkins	Mickens	Smith
Arizona											
Stanford											
Oregon											
Arizona State											
California											
Colorado											
UCLA											
Oregon State											
Washington State											
Opponent	DE	NT	DT	RE	LB	LB	LB	S	S	CB	CB
#19 Boise State	Kikaha	Shelton	Hudson	Littleton	Feeney	Timu	Thompson	Shamburger	Parker	Peters	Ducre
Illinois	Kikaha	Shelton	Hudson	Littleton	Fuimaono	Timu	Thompson	Shamburger	Parker	Peters	Ducre
Idaho State	Kikaha	Shelton	Hudson	Littleton	Fuimaono	Tutogi	Thompson	Shamburger	Parker	Peters	Ducre
Arizona											
Stanford											
Oregon											
Arizona State											
California											
Colorado											
UCLA											
Oregon State											
Washington State											

== Roster and coaching staff ==
2013 Washington Huskies football team roster
Players
Coaches
Offense

Pos.	#	Name	Class
TE	85	David Ajamu	Fr
OL	70	James Atoe	Jr
OL	60	Shane Brostek	So
HB	18	Derrick Brown	RSo
TB	24	Jessie Callier	RJr
WR	19	DiAndre Campbell	RJr
OL	76	Dexter Charles	RSo
TB	22	Lavon Coleman	Fr
TB	32	Deontae Cooper	RJr
OL	55	Dane Crane	Fr
OL	78	Mike Criste	RJr
WR	15	Darrell Daniels	Fr
OL	62	Ross Dolbec	RSo
OL	52	Jake Eldrenkamp	RFr
OL	69	Cory Fuavai	RFr
WR	16	Marvin Hall	So
TE	84	Michael Hartvigson	RJr
OL	72	Micah Hatchee	RJr
OL	63	Taylor Hindy	RFr
FB	35	Ralph Kinne	Fr
OL	73	Andrew Kirkland	Fr
OL	67	Michael Kneip	RFr
OL	75	Erik Kohler	RJr
QB	5	Jeff Lindquist	RFr
RB	31	Ryan McDaniel	RFr
WR	4	Jaydon Mickens	So
QB	10	Cyler Miles	RFr
WR	86	Taelon Parson	Fr
TE	82	Joshua Perkins	RSo
QB	17	Keith Price	RSr
OL	59	Ben Riva	RJr
WR	1	John Ross III	Fr
WR	89	Neel Salukhe	Fr
WR	81	Wesley Salyer	So
TB	25	Bishop Sankey	Jr
TE	88	Austin Seferian-Jenkins	So
OL	79	Coleman Shelton	Fr
WR	89	Antavius Sims	Sr
WR	8	Kevin Smith	Sr
WR	9	Damore'ea Stringfellow	Fr
OL	64	Colin Tanigawa	RJr
TB/WR	23	Kendyl Taylor	So
OL	65	Siosifa Tufunga	RSo
TB	12	Dwayne Washington	RFr
WR	2	Kasen Williams	Jr
QB	3	Troy Williams	Fr
FB	28	Psalm Wooching	RFr

Defense

Pos.	#	Name	Class
DT	99	Josh Banks	Sr
CB	9	Brandon Beaver	RFr
LB	25	Keishawn Bierria	Fr
CB	35	Brian Clay	So
LB	34	Sean Constantine	Fr
DE	91	Connor Cree	RSo
CB	26	Travell Dixon	RJr
CB	18	Greg Ducre	Sr
CB	30	Patrick Enewally	Fr
LB	54	Ronnie Espedal	Fr
DE	23	Marcus Farria	Fr
LB	41	Travis Feeney	RSo
DE	95	Jarett Finau	RSo
LB	37	Princeton Fuimaono	Sr
DE	93	Andrew Hudson	RJr
DE	80	Evan Hudson	RJr
LB	58	Jamaal Kearse	RJr
CB	6	Jermaine Kelly	Fr
DE	8	Hau'oli Kikaha	Jr
CB	20	Kevin King	Fr
DT	97	Lawrence Lagafuaina	RJr
LB	47	Scott Lawyer	RSo
LB	42	Cory Littleton	So
DE	5	Joe Mathis	Fr
S	38	Kyle Nelson	Fr
LB	29	Connor O'Brien	Fr
S	1	Sean Parker	Sr
CB	21	Marcus Peters	RSo
DT	55	Sione Potoa'e	Fr
DT	11	Elijah Qualls	Fr
LB	53	Eric Rauch	Fr
DL	77	Drew Schultz	RJr
S	13	Will Shamburger	Sr
DL	71	Danny Shelton	Jr
DE	22	Josh Shirley	RJr
S	14	Taz Stevenson	Sr
CB	43	Caleb Taylor	Fr
LB	7	Shaq Thompson	So
LB	10	John Timu	Jr
DL	90	Taniela Tupou	RSo
DT	66	Damion Turpin	RFr
LB	50	Thomas Tutogi	Sr
LB	36	Azeem Victor	Fr
S	39	Thomas Vincent	RSo
S	27	Trevor Walker	Fr
CB	3	Cleveland Wallace	RFr
CB	32	Tre Watson	RSr

Special teams

Pos.	#	Name	Class
LS	49	Weston Blackburn	So
P/PK	46	Travis Coons	Sr
P	45	Korey Durkee	So
P	40	Zach Grossnickle	Sr
LS	51	Luke Hutchinson	Fr
LS	77	Ryan Masel	So
PK	48	Cameron Van Winkle	Fr

Head coach

- Steve Sarkisian
  5th season
  5th year at Washington
  alma mater: BYU

Coordinators/assistant coaches

- Eric Kiesau
  2nd season as OC/WR coach
  2nd year at Washington
  alma mater: Portland State
- Justin Wilcox
  2nd season as DC coach
  2nd year at Washington
  alma mater: Oregon
- Dan Cozzetto
  5th season as Run Game Coordinator/OL coach
  5th year at Washington
  alma mater: Idaho
- Keith Heyward
  2nd season as DB Coach
  2nd year at Washington
  alma mater: Oregon State
- Tosh Lupoi
  2nd season as DL Coach/Defensive RG
  2nd year at Washington
  alma mater: California
- Johnny Nansen
  5th season as Asst HC/ST/RB coach
  5th year at Washington
  alma mater: Washington State
- Jordan Paopao
  1st season as TE coach
  3rd year at Washington
  alma mater: San Diego
- Peter Sirmon
  1st season as Rec Coord/LB coach
  2nd year at Washington
  alma mater: Oregon
- Marques Tuiasosopo
  1st season as QB coach
  1st year at Washington
  alma mater: Washington
- Ivan Lewis
  strength and conditioning coach
- Jared Blank
  director of football operations
- Danny Razore
  graduate assistant
- Conor Knowles
  graduate assistant
- D'Andre Goodwin
  graduate assistant
- Kenyon Blue
  graduate assistant

Legend

- (C) Team captain
- (S) Suspended
- (I) Ineligible
- Injured
- Redshirt

Roster
Last update: October 1, 2013

== Schedule ==
Date	Time	Opponent	Rank	Site	TV	Result	Attendance
August 31	7:00 p.m.	No. 19 Boise State*		Husky Stadium; Seattle, WA	FS1	W 38–6	71,963
September 14	6:00p.m.	vs. Illinois*	No. 19	Soldier Field; Chicago, IL	BTN	W 34–24	47,312
September 21	12:00 p.m.	Idaho State*	No. 17	Husky Stadium; Seattle, WA	P12N	W 56–0	67,093
September 28	4:00 p.m.	Arizona	No. 16	Husky Stadium; Seattle, WA	FOX	W 31–13	65,815
October 5	7:30 p.m.	at No. 5 Stanford	No. 15	Stanford Stadium; Stanford, CA	ESPN	L 28–31	50,424
October 12	1:00 p.m.	No. 2 Oregon	No. 16	Husky Stadium; Seattle, WA (rivalry, College GameDay)	FS1	L 24–45	71,833
October 19	3:00 p.m.	at Arizona State	No. 20	Sun Devil Stadium; Tempe, AZ	P12N	L 24–53	60,057
October 26	8:00 p.m.	California^{†}		Husky Stadium; Seattle, WA	FS1	W 41–17	66,328
November 9	5:00 p.m.	Colorado		Husky Stadium; Seattle, WA	P12N	W 59–7	66,599
November 15	6:00 p.m.	at No. 13 UCLA		Rose Bowl; Pasadena, CA	ESPN2	L 31–41	68,106
November 23	7:30 p.m.	at Oregon State		Reser Stadium; Corvallis, OR	ESPN2	W 69–27	43,779
November 29	12:30 p.m.	Washington State		Husky Stadium; Seattle, WA (Apple Cup)	FOX	W 27–17	71,753
December 27	6:30 p.m.	vs. BYU*	No. 25	AT&T Park; San Francisco, CA (Fight Hunger Bowl)	ESPN	W 31–16	34,136
*Non-conference game; ^{†}Homecoming; Rankings from AP Poll released prior to the game; All times are in Pacific time

== Game summaries ==
=== Boise State ===
	1	2	3	4	Total
#19 Broncos	0	3	3	0	6
Huskies	7	3	14	14	38

=== Illinois ===
	1	2	3	4	Total
#19 Huskies	0	10	21	3	34
Illini	0	3	14	7	24

=== Idaho State ===
	1	2	3	4	Total
Bengals	0	0	0	0	0
#17 Huskies	21	21	7	7	56

=== Arizona ===
	1	2	3	4	Total
Wildcats	0	6	7	0	13
#16 Huskies	8	3	14	6	31

=== Stanford ===
	1	2	3	4	Total
#15 Huskies	0	7	14	7	28
#5 Cardinal	7	10	14	0	31

=== Oregon ===
	1	2	3	4	Total
#2 Ducks	7	14	10	14	45
#16 Huskies	7	0	17	0	24

=== Arizona State ===
	1	2	3	4	Total
#20 Huskies	7	0	10	7	24
Sun Devils	3	26	10	14	53

=== Cal ===
	1	2	3	4	Total
Golden Bears	0	7	0	10	17
Huskies	17	7	14	3	41

=== Colorado ===
	1	2	3	4	Total
Buffaloes	7	0	0	0	7
Huskies	10	21	21	7	59

=== UCLA ===
	1	2	3	4	Total
Huskies	7	10	7	7	31
#13 Bruins	20	7	7	7	41

The Bruins lead the series, 38–30–2. Last time the teams met, during the 2010 season, Washington won 24–7 in Seattle. UCLA was the winner in the Rose Bowl, a 24–23 decision in 2009. The Bruins have won the last seven straight games played in the Rose Bowl against the Huskies.

1st quarter scoring: UCLA – Myles Jack 8-yard run (Kaʻimi Fairbairn kick); UCLA – Cassius Marsh 2-yard pass from Brett Hundley (Fairbairn kick); WASH – Bishop Sankey 2-yard run (Travis Coons kick); UCLA – Jack 1-yard run (failed kick)

2nd quarter scoring: UCLA – Jack 1-yard run (Fairbairn kick); WASH – Jaydon Mickens 2-yard pass from Keith Price (Coons kick); WASH – Coons 34-yard field goal

3rd quarter scoring: WASH – Austin Seferian-Jenkins 1-yard pass from Cyler Miles (Coons kick); UCLA – Jack 2-yard run (Fairbairn kick)

4th quarter scoring: UCLA – Devin Lucien 40-yard pass from Hundley (Fairbairn kick); WASH – Damore'ea Stringfellow 14-yard pass from Miles (Coons kick)

=== Oregon State ===
	1	2	3	4	Total
Huskies	17	10	21	21	69
Beavers	0	0	0	27	27

=== Washington State ===
	1	2	3	4	Total
Cougars	0	10	0	7	17
Huskies	3	0	17	7	27

1st quarter scoring: UW – Travis Coons 48-yard field goal

2nd quarter scoring: WSU – Andrew Furney 49-yard field goal; WSU – Rickey Galvin 14-yard pass from C. Halliday (Furney kick)

3rd quarter scoring: UW – Seferian Jenkins 18-yard pass from Keith Price (Coons kick); UW – Bishop Sankey 7-yard run (Coons kick); UW – Coons 39-yard field goal

4th quarter scoring: WSU – Dom. Williams 5-yard pass from Halliday (Furney kick); UW – Price 2-yard run (Coons kick)

=== BYU ===
	1	2	3	4	Total
Cougars	0	16	0	0	16
Huskies	7	14	7	3	31

1st quarter scoring: WASH – Bishop Sankey 11-yard run (Travis Coons kick)

2nd quarter scoring: BYU – Taysom Hill 1-yard run (Justin Sorensen kick); WASH – John Ross III 100-yard kick return (Coons kick); BYU – Sorensen 45-yard field goal; BYU – Sorensen 31-yard field goal; WASH – Sankey 11-yard run (Coons kick); BYU – Sorensen 32-yard field goal

3rd quarter scoring: WASH – Austin Seferian-Jenkins 16-yard reception from Keith Price (Coons kick)

4th quarter scoring: WASH – Coons 45-yard field goal

== Rankings ==
Ranking movements Legend: ██ Increase in ranking ██ Decrease in ranking — = Not ranked RV = Received votes
	Week																
Poll	Pre	1	2	3	4	5	6	7	8	9	10	11	12	13	14	15	Final
AP	RV	20	19	17	16	15	16	20	RV	RV	RV	RV	—	—	—	RV	25
Coaches	RV	23	23	20	20	18	19	25	RV	—	—	RV	—	—	—	RV	RV
Harris	Not released							25	RV	RV	—	RV	—	RV	RV	RV	Not released
BCS	Not released								—	—	—	—	—	—	—	—	Not released

== Notes ==
- December 2, 2013 – Head coach Steve Sarkisian left the team to take the job at USC
- December 6, 2013 – Chris Petersen from Boise State was hired as the next head coach at Washington
- Bishop Sankey set a new University of Washington record for rushing yards in a season with 1,870 yards. This eclipsed Corey Dillon's 1,695 yards from 1996.
