= Chris Strausser =

American football coach (born 1963)

Boise State
- Title: Assistant offensive line coach

Personal information
- Born: December 4, 1963 (age 62); Cleveland, Ohio, U.S.

Career information
- High school: Gunn (CA)
- College: Chico State

Career history
- Menlo (1989) Wide receivers/tight ends coach; Oregon State (1990–1991) Graduate assistant; Sonoma State (1992) Offensive tackles/tight ends/special teams coordinator; Portland State (1993–1994) Offensive line coach/recruiting coordinator; San Jose State (1995–1996) Tight ends coach/recruiting coordinator; Foothill (1997–1999) Offensive coordinator; Portland State (2000) Offensive line coach/run game coordinator; Boise State (2001–2005) Offensive line coach; Colorado (2006) Assistant head coach/offensive line coach; Boise State (2007–2009) Tight ends coach/run game coordinator; Boise State (2010–2013) Offensive line coach/run game coordinator; Washington (2014–2016) Associate head coach/offensive line coach; Denver Broncos (2017) Assistant offensive line coach; Denver Broncos (2018) Offensive line – tackles coach; Indianapolis Colts (2019–2022) Offensive line coach; Houston Texans (2023–2024) Offensive line coach; Boise State (2026–present) Assistant offensive line coach

James Christopher Strausser (born December 4, 1963) is an American football coach who was recently the offensive line coach for the Houston Texans of the National Football League (NFL). He was previously the offensive line coach for the Colts in 2022. He was the offensive line coach for tackles for the Denver Broncos in 2018, and the assistant offensive line coach for them in 2017. Prior to his stint with the Broncos, he was a college football coach who had worked at programs such as Boise State, Colorado, and Washington.

== Coaching career ==
Strausser began his coaching career at Menlo College in 1989 as the program's wide receivers and tight ends coach. After a stint at Oregon State as a graduate assistant, he went on to coach at Sonoma State as the special teams coordinator and offensive tackles & tight ends coach. He also coached at Portland State and San Jose State, as well as a stint as offensive coordinator at Foothill College. He was hired as the offensive line coach at Boise State in 2001 as the offensive line coach following a short return to Portland State in 2000.

After a year at Colorado as their assistant head coach and offensive line coach, Strausser returned to Boise State in 2007 as their tight ends coach and run game coordinator under Chris Petersen. He was shifted back to offensive line coach in 2010, where he was credited with transitioning Matt Paradis from a defensive lineman to an offensive lineman as Paradis earned second-team All-Mountain West Conference honors. He followed Petersen to Washington in 2014, coaching as his associate head coach and offensive line coach.

=== Denver Broncos ===
Strausser was hired as the assistant offensive line coach for the Denver Broncos in 2017, reuniting him with Paradis once again. He was promoted to co-offensive line coach in 2018 with the title "Offensive Line – Tackles Coach".

=== Indianapolis Colts ===
Strausser was named the offensive line coach for the Indianapolis Colts on January 29, 2019. It was later revealed that Colts head coach Frank Reich contacted Strausser out of the blue, as the two did not work together or ever meet prior to the phone call offering Strausser the position.

=== Houston Texans ===
Strausser was named the offensive line coach for the Houston Texans on February 21, 2023. He retired from the team after the 2024 season.
