= Pete Kwiatkowski =

American football player and coach (born 1966)

Arizona Cardinals
- Title: Defensive line coach

Personal information
- Born: August 29, 1966 (age 60)

Career information
- Position: Defensive end
- College: Boise State (1984–1987)

Career history
- Boise State (1988–1996) Defensive backs coach, outside linebackers coach & defensive line coach; Snow (1997) Co-defensive coordinator & defensive line coach; Eastern Washington (1998–1999) Defensive line coach; Montana State (2000–2005) Defensive coordinator; Boise State (2006–2009) Defensive line coach; Boise State (2010–2013) Defensive coordinator; Washington (2014–2017) Defensive coordinator; Washington (2018–2019) Co-defensive coordinator & outside linebackers coach; Washington (2020) Defensive coordinator; Texas (2021–2025) Defensive coordinator; Arizona Cardinals (2026–present) Defensive line coach

Awards and highlights
- NCAA Division I-AA All-American (1987); Big Sky Defensive Player of the Year (1987); 2× First-team All-Big Sky (1986, 1987)

Pete Kwiatkowski (born August 29, 1966) is an American professional football coach who is the defensive line coach for the Arizona Cardinals of the National Football League (NFL). He previously served as the defensive coordinator at the University of Texas at Austin from 2021 to 2025.

Kwiatkowski played college football at Boise State and has previously served as an assistant coach at Boise State University, Snow College, Eastern Washington University, Montana State University, University of Washington and the University of Texas at Austin.

== Playing career ==
Kwiatkowski played college football at Boise State as a defensive lineman from 1984 to 1987, where he was a first-team All-American (Division I-AA) in 1987. He was an honorable mention All-America recognition from the Associated Press in 1986, Big Sky defensive player of the year in 1987, first-team All-Big Sky (1986, 1987), and honorable mention as a sophomore in 1985.

Kwiatkowski was inducted into the Boise State Athletic Hall of Fame in 1996.

== Coaching career ==
=== Early years ===
Kwiatkowski began his coaching career at Boise State in 1988, coaching a number of positions on defense including the defensive backs, outside linebackers, and the defensive line. After nine seasons with the Broncos, he was the co-defensive coordinator position at Snow College in Utah for one season (1997) and the defensive line coach at Eastern Washington in Cheney for two years (1998, 1999).

=== Montana State ===
Kwiatkowski moved to Montana State in 2000 and coordinated the Bobcats' defense for six seasons. While in Bozeman, his defenses were a league-best in yards allowed per game, passing defense, and scoring defense. In 2002, on the back of Kwiatkowski's defense the Bobcats earned a spot in the playoffs for the first time in nearly 20 years.

=== Boise State ===
Following a highly successful stretch in Bozeman, Kwiatkowski returned to Boise State in 2006 to coach the defensive line under recently promoted head coach Chris Petersen. In 2010, he was promoted to defensive coordinator and his unit finished second nationally in total defense; he stayed at BSU through 2013.

=== Washington ===
After the 2013 season, Kwiatkowski followed Petersen to Washington in Seattle. In his debut season as defensive coordinator for the Huskies in 2014, he coached three to All-American status, including the first unanimous All-American at Washington in 20 years: defensive end Hau'oli Kikaha. Four of Kwiatkowski's players were selected in the first two rounds of the 2015 NFL draft, including three in the first round.

=== Texas ===
In January 2021, Kwiatkowski accepted an offer from new Longhorns head coach Steve Sarkisian to become the defensive coordinator for the Texas Longhorns. Kwiatkowski cited the 1978 Cotton Bowl Classic as a reason for being interested in the position, stating that he'd been interested in the Longhorns ever since he'd watched that game. Texas fired Kwiatkowski following the 2025 season. Former Texas defensive coordinator Will Muschamp replaced him.

=== Arizona Cardinals ===
On February 20, 2026, Kwiatkowksi was hired by the Arizona Cardinals as their defensive line coach under head coach Mike LaFleur.

== Personal life ==
Kwiatkowski and his wife Lara have three daughters.
