= Keith Bhonapha =

American football player and coach (born 1980)

Current position
- Title: Running backs coach
- Team: California
- Conference: ACC

Biographical details
- Born: May 12, 1980 (age 46); Oakland, California, U.S.

Playing career
- 1999–2002: Hawaii
- Position: Defensive back

Coaching career (HC unless noted)
- 2003–2005: Hawaii (GA)
- 2009–2010: Boise State (RB)
- 2011–2013: Boise State (RB/RC)
- 2014–2019: Washington (RB/RC)
- 2020: Washington (RB)
- 2021: Washington (ST/RB)
- 2022: Boise State (AHC/RB)
- 2023: Oregon State (AHC/RB)
- 2024–2025: Michigan State (AHC/RB)
- 2026–present: California (RB)

Administrative career (AD unless noted)
- 2006–2008: Boise State (director of football ops.)

Keith Abu Bhonapha (born May 12, 1980) is an American football coach who is currently the running backs coach at The University of California. He played college football at Hawaii, where also began his coaching career. He has also spent time as an assistant at University of Washington and Michigan State University.

== Playing career ==
Bhonapha played college football at Hawaii from 1999 to 2002, where he was a defensive back who was credited with the ability to play both safety and cornerback.

== Coaching career ==
=== Hawaii ===
Following his playing career, Bhonapha was offered a graduate assistant position at his alma mater Hawaii by head coach June Jones, where he helped to coach the defensive backs with secondary coach Rich Miano. While at Hawaii, he was credited with connecting Davone Bess with Hawaii, as the two had the same high school football coach.

=== Boise State ===
Bhonapha was hired as the director of football operations at Boise State in 2006. He was reassigned to running backs coach in 2009 in a series of staff shuffling made by Boise State head coach Chris Petersen. He added the title of recruiting coordinator in 2011.

=== Washington ===
Bhonapha followed Petersen to Washington in 2014 to serve as his running backs coach and the program's recruiting coordinator. While he was the recruiting coordinator, he and fellow assistant Ikaika Malloe were credited with rebuilding a recruiting pipeline in the state of Hawaii in part to their connections to the state that ended up with the successful recruitments of players such as Zion Tupuola-Fetui. He was promoted to special teams coordinator in 2021 following the promotion of Bob Gregory to defensive coordinator.

=== Return to Boise State ===
Bhonapha returned to Boise State on December 31, 2021. While at Boise State, Bhonapaha was in charge of both Running Backs and Special Teams. Bhonapha also played a key role in the recruitment and development of Ashton Jeanty alongside then Offensive Coordinator Tim Plough. While at Boise State, Bhonapha helped the Bronocos to 196 rushing yards a game. George Holani rushed for 1,157 yards, extending Boise's 1000-yard streak to 21 of the previous 22 seasons.

=== Oregon State and Michigan State ===
Bhonapha coached at Oregon State and then Michigan State under Head Coach Jonathan Smith. He was not retained by new Michigan State Coach Pat Fitzgerald after Smith and most of the MSU staff were fired for not coaching football well enough.

=== California ===
On December 22, 2025 Bhonapha was named Running Backs coach at the University of California, Berkeley by new Cal Bears head coach Tosh Lupoi.
