= Cyler Miles =

American football player (born 1994)

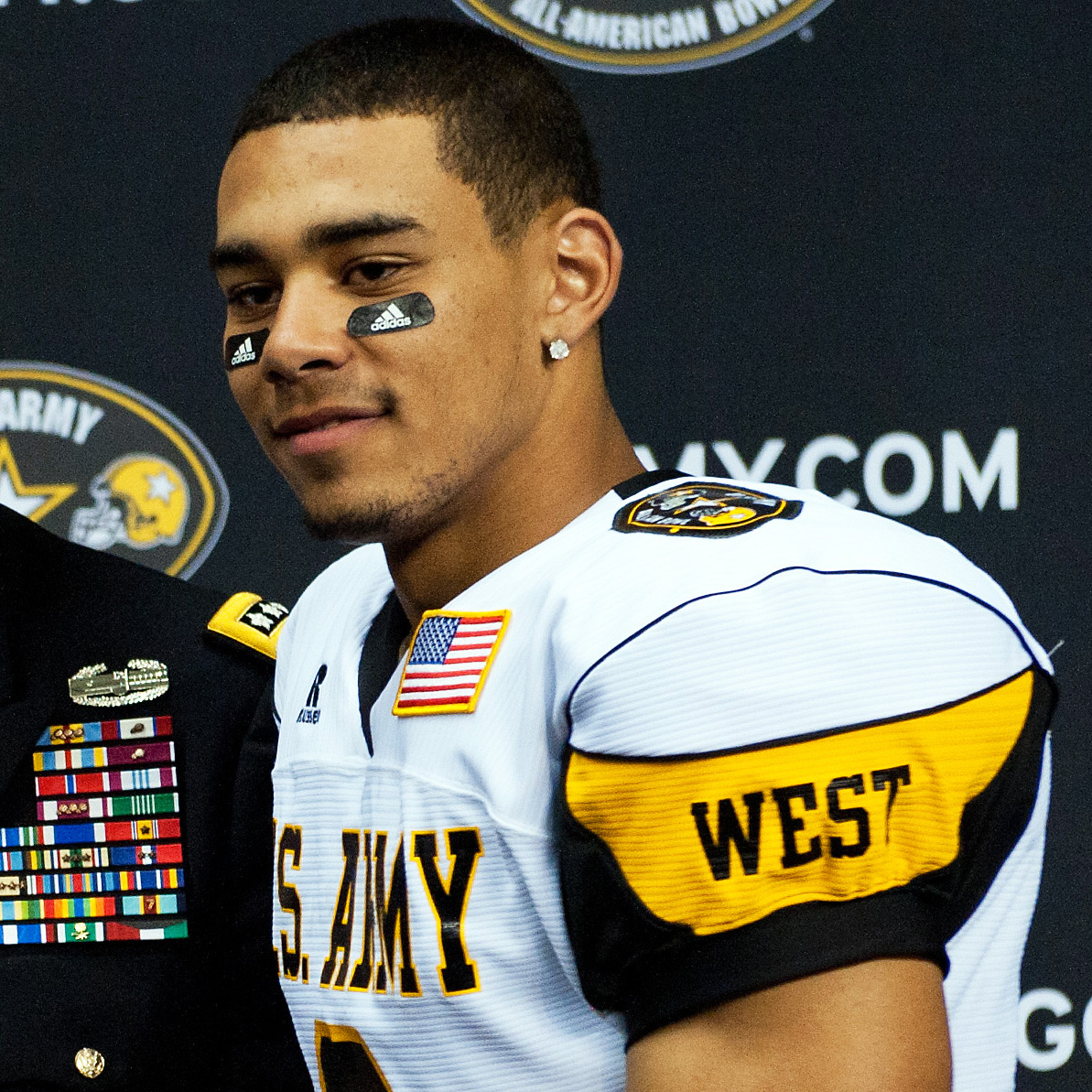
- Miles at the 2012 U.S. Army All-American Bowl

No. 10
- Position: Quarterback

Personal information
- Born: March 26, 1994 (age 32); Centennial, Colorado, U.S.
- Listed height: 6 ft 4 in (1.93 m)
- Listed weight: 225 lb (102 kg)

Career information
- High school: Denver (CO) Mullen
- College: Washington (2012−2014)

Cyler Miles (born March 26, 1994) is an American former football quarterback. He played college football for the Washington Huskies from 2012 to 2014.

== Early life ==
Miles attended Mullen High School in Denver Colorado. As a senior, he was selected to play in the U. S. Army All-American Bowl, where he was named the co-MVP after completing seven of eight passes for 155 yards, a passing touchdown and a rushing touchdown. Miles was ranked by Rivals.com as the second best dual-threat quarterback recruit in his class and the 35th best player overall. He committed to play college football at the University of Washington in June 2011.

== College career ==
Miles was redshirted as a freshman in 2012. As a redshirt freshman in 2013, Miles was a backup to starter Keith Price. He made his first career start against Oregon State after Price missed the game due to an injury. Overall, Miles appeared in eight games, completing 37 of 61 passes for 418 yards, four touchdowns and two interceptions. As a sophomore in 2014, Miles was suspended for the first game of the season due to an altercation he was involved with in February. Prior to the second game of the season, he was named the starter.

On March 13, 2015, the Washington Huskies announced that Miles would take a leave of absence from the team for "personal reasons". On June 22, 2015, Miles announced that he would retire from football due to a chronic hip injury.

== Seattle Seahawks fan assault controversy ==
After the Seattle Seahawks blowout victory over the Denver Broncos in Super Bowl XLVIII, Miles and Husky teammate Damore'ea Stringfellow were both involved in two separate assault incidents with Seahawks fans in Seattle. According to witnesses, both were identified as the aggressors. This received much criticism in Seattle, home of the Huskies and Seahawks. Stringfellow was charged with fourth degree assault while Miles escaped prosecution. Stringfellow consequently was kicked off the team, and Miles was suspended from spring practices and the first game of the Huskies 2014 season.
