= 2016 Washington Huskies football team =

American college football season

2016 Washington Huskies football

Pac-12 champion Pac-12 North Division champion

Pac-12 Championship Game, W 41–10 vs. Colorado

Peach Bowl (CFP Semifinal), L 7–24 vs. Alabama
- Conference: Pac-12 Conference
- North Division

Ranking
- Coaches: No. 4
- AP: No. 4
- Record: 12–2 (8–1 Pac-12)
- Head coach: Chris Petersen (3rd season)
- Offensive coordinator: Jonathan Smith (3rd season)
- Offensive scheme: Single set back
- Defensive coordinator: Pete Kwiatkowski (3rd season)
- Co-defensive coordinator: Jimmy Lake (1st season)
- Base defense: 3–4
- MVPs: John Ross (offense); Budda Baker (defense); Lavon Coleman (special teams); Ezekiel Turner (special teams)
- Captains: Darrell Daniels; Kevin King
- Home stadium: Husky Stadium

2016 Pac-12 Conference football standings
	Conf.			Overall
Team	W		L	W		L
North Division
No. 4 Washington xy$^	8	–	1	12	–	2
Washington State	7	–	2	8	–	5
No. 12 Stanford	6	–	3	10	–	3
California	3	–	6	5	–	7
Oregon State	3	–	6	4	–	8
Oregon	2	–	7	4	–	8
South Division
No. 17 Colorado xy	8	–	1	10	–	4
No. 3 USC	7	–	2	10	–	3
No. 23 Utah	5	–	4	9	–	4
Arizona State	2	–	7	5	–	7
UCLA	2	–	7	4	–	8
Arizona	1	–	8	3	–	9
Championship: Washington 41, Colorado 10
^ – College Football Playoff participant; $ – Conference champion; x – Division champion/co-champions; y – Championship game participant; Rankings from AP Poll

The 2016 Washington Huskies football team represented the University of Washington in the 2016 NCAA Division I FBS football season. The team was led by Chris Petersen in his third season as head coach of the Huskies. Washington competed as a member of the North Division of the Pac-12 Conference and played their home games on campus at Husky Stadium in Seattle.

Washington finished the season with a 12–2 overall record and went 8–1 in conference to win the Pac-12 North Division, the program's first division title since the Pac-12 expanded and split into divisions in 2011. Most notable was defeating Stanford and Oregon, two of the toughest annual opponents for the team in recent years, by a combined 114–28. The Stanford game took place in front of a sold out crowd on ESPN and the Oregon game snapped a 12-game losing streak to the Ducks. The Huskies earned a berth in the Pac-12 Championship Game where they defeated Colorado to win their first conference title since 2000. They were selected as the #4 seed in the College Football Playoff and played in the Peach Bowl, where they lost to #1 seed Alabama. Washington was ranked #4 in the final AP Poll of the 2016 season. The 2016 Huskies were the last Pac-12 team to represent the conference in the College Football Playoff until 2023.

== Recruiting class ==
College recruiting (2016)
Name	Hometown	School	Height	Weight	Commit date
Byron Murphy; Cornerback	Scottsdale, AZ	Saguaro High School	5 ft 11 in (1.80 m)	170 lb (77 kg)	Jan 21, 2016
Byron Murphy; Cornerback	Recruit ratings: Scout: Rivals: 247Sports:				
Isaiah Gilchrist; Athlete	Bellevue, WA	Bellevue High School	5 ft 10 in (1.78 m)	180 lb (82 kg)	Sep 12, 2015
Isaiah Gilchrist; Athlete	Recruit ratings: Scout: Rivals: 247Sports:				
Milo Eifler; Outside Linebacker	Oakland, CA	Bishop O'Dowd High School	6 ft 2 in (1.88 m)	215 lb (98 kg)	Jul 9, 2015
Milo Eifler; Outside Linebacker	Recruit ratings: Scout: Rivals: 247Sports:				
Brandon Wellington; Running back	Bellevue, WA	Eastside Catholic High School	6 ft 0 in (1.83 m)	217 lb (98 kg)	Aug 12, 2015
Brandon Wellington; Running back	Recruit ratings: Scout: Rivals: 247Sports:				
Taylor Rapp; Safety	Bellingham, WA	Sehome High School	6 ft 0 in (1.83 m)	199 lb (90 kg)	Mar 13, 2015
Taylor Rapp; Safety	Recruit ratings: Scout: Rivals: 247Sports:				
Sean McGrew; Running back	Bellflower, CA	St. John Bosco High School	5 ft 7 in (1.70 m)	174 lb (79 kg)	May 20, 2015
Sean McGrew; Running back	Recruit ratings: Scout: Rivals: 247Sports:				
Luke Wattenberg; Offensive tackle	San Juan Capistrano, CA	JSerra Catholic High School	6 ft 5 in (1.96 m)	265 lb (120 kg)	May 20, 2015
Luke Wattenberg; Offensive tackle	Recruit ratings: Scout: Rivals: 247Sports:				
Jordan Chin; Wide receiver	West Hills, CA	Chaminade College Prep	6 ft 0 in (1.83 m)	149 lb (68 kg)	Jan 24, 2016
Jordan Chin; Wide receiver	Recruit ratings: Scout: Rivals: 247Sports:				
Kentrell Love; Cornerback	Corona, CA	Centennial High School	6 ft 1 in (1.85 m)	170 lb (77 kg)	Jul 30, 2015
Kentrell Love; Cornerback	Recruit ratings: Scout: Rivals: 247Sports:				
Levi Onwuzurike; Defensive end	Allen, TX	Allen High School	6 ft 3 in (1.91 m)	235 lb (107 kg)	Jan 20, 2016
Levi Onwuzurike; Defensive end	Recruit ratings: Scout: Rivals: 247Sports:				
Amandre Williams; Defensive end	Covington, WA	Tahoma High School	6 ft 3 in (1.91 m)	230 lb (100 kg)	Aug 9, 2015
Amandre Williams; Defensive end	Recruit ratings: Scout: Rivals: 247Sports:				
Aaron Fuller; Wide receiver	Allen, TX	Lovejoy High School	5 ft 11 in (1.80 m)	175 lb (79 kg)	Jul 15, 2015
Aaron Fuller; Wide receiver	Recruit ratings: Scout: Rivals: 247Sports:				
Myles Rice; Defensive end	Houston, TX	George Bush High School	6 ft 3 in (1.91 m)	220 lb (100 kg)	Oct 2, 2014
Myles Rice; Defensive end	Recruit ratings: Scout: Rivals: 247Sports:				
Kamari Pleasant; Athlete	Etiwanda, CA	Etiwanda High School	6 ft 1 in (1.85 m)	185 lb (84 kg)	Jan 22, 2016
Kamari Pleasant; Athlete	Recruit ratings: Scout: Rivals: 247Sports:				
Van Soderberg; Punter	Olympia, WA	Capital High School	6 ft 0 in (1.83 m)	200 lb (91 kg)	Aug 5, 2015
Van Soderberg; Punter	Recruit ratings: Scout: Rivals: 247Sports:				
Nick Harris; Center	San Juan Capistrano, CA	JSerra Catholic High School	6 ft 1 in (1.85 m)	272 lb (123 kg)	Jul 30, 2015
Nick Harris; Center	Recruit ratings: Scout: Rivals: 247Sports:				
Jacob Kizer; Tight end	Salem, OR	West Salem High School	6 ft 5 in (1.96 m)	235 lb (107 kg)	Jul 25, 2015
Jacob Kizer; Tight end	Recruit ratings: Scout: Rivals: 247Sports:				
Daniel Bridge-Gadd; Quarterback	Phoenix, AZ	Paradise Valley High School	6 ft 2 in (1.88 m)	181 lb (82 kg)	Oct 19, 2015
Daniel Bridge-Gadd; Quarterback	Recruit ratings: Scout: Rivals: 247Sports:				
Overall recruit ranking: Scout: 29 Rivals: 29 247Sports: 38
Note: In many cases, Scout, Rivals, 247Sports, On3, and ESPN may conflict in their listings of height and weight.; In these cases, the average was taken. ESPN grades are on a 100-point scale.; Sources: "2016 Team Ranking". Rivals.com.

== Personnel ==
2016 Washington Huskies football team roster
Players
Coaches
Offense

Pos.	#	Name	Class
OL	72	Trey Adams	So
TE	85	David Ajamu	Jr
WR	19	Andre Baccellia	Fr
WR	31	Drew Before	Sr
QB	17	Daniel Bridge-Gadd	Fr
OL	60	Shane Brostek	Sr
QB	3	Jake Browning	So
OL	77	Devin Burleson	Fr
QB	11	K. J. Carta-Samuels	So
WR	82	Jordan Chin	Fr
TB	22	Lavon Coleman	Jr
OL	62	Duke Clinch	Fr
WR	15	Darrell Daniels	Sr
TE	98	Will Dissly	Jr
TB	10	Jomon Dotson	So
WR	87	Forrest Dunivin	Jr
OL	52	Jake Eldrenkamp	Sr
WR	12	Aaron Fuller	Fr
WR	89	John Gardner	So
RB	9	Myles Gaskin	So
QB	16	Blake Gregory	Fr
WR	83	Connor Griffin	Jr
OL	56	Nick Harris	Fr
OL	70	Jared Hilbers	Fr
TE	94	Derek Hunter	Jr
TB	23	Logan Hurst	Fr
OL	71	Matt James	So
TB	40	Ralph Kinne	Jr
OL	73	Andrew Kirkland	Jr
OL	46	AJ Kneip	Fr
OL	67	Michael Kneip	Sr
WR	81	Brayden Lenius	Jr
TE	5	Jeff Lindquist	Sr
WR	28	Nik Little	Sr
WR	6	Chico McClatcher	So
TB	30	Gavin McDaniel	So
OL	58	Kaleb McGary	So
TB	25	Sean McGrew	Fr
TE	84	Michael Neal	Fr
WR	86	Taelon Parson	Jr
FB/TE	45	Mike Petroff	Fr
WR	8	Dante Pettis	Jr
TB	24	Kamari Pleasant	Fr
WR	21	Quinten Pounds	Fr
WR	29	Josh Rasmussen	Fr
WR	80	Max Richmond	So
OL	59	Henry Roberts	Fr
QB	7	Tony Rodriguez	Sr
WR	1	John Ross III	Jr
TE	88	Drew Sample	So
OL	79	Coleman Shelton	Jr
OL	75	Jessie Sosebee	So
OL	74	John Turner	So
OL	76	Luke Wattenberg	Fr
WR	18	K.J. Young	Jr

Defense

Pos.	#	Name	Class
S	32	Budda Baker	Jr
LB	17	Tevis Bartlett	So
CB	9	Brandon Beaver	Sr
LB	15	DJ Beavers	So
DB	47	Ian Biddle	So
LB	7	Keishawn Bierria	Jr
DE	96	Shane Bowman	So
OLB	55	Ryan Bowman	Fr
DB	31	Myles Bryant	Fr
LB	25	Ben Burr-Kirven	So
DL	57	John Clark	Fr
LB	34	Sean Constantine	Jr
LB	40	Milo Eifler	Fr
DT	99	Greg Gaines	So
CB	3	Darren Gardenhire	Jr
DB	18	Isaiah Gilchrist	Fr
DE	92	Jaylen Johnson	So
CB	26	Sidney Jones	Jr
CB	4	Austin Joyner	Fr
CB	20	Kevin King	Sr
CB	19	Brandon Lewis	So
DB	12	Kentrell Love	Fr
LB	30	Kyler Manu	Fr
OLB	5	Joe Mathis	Sr
DL	91	Ricky McCoy	Fr
S	14	JoJo McIntosh	So
DB	23	Jordan Miller	So
DB	6	Byron Murphy	Fr
OLB	29	Connor O'Brien	Jr
DL	95	Levi Onwuzurike	Fr
DE	8	Benning Potoa'e	Fr
LB	54	Matt Preston	So
DL	56	Jared Pulu	Fr
DT	11	Elijah Qualls	Jr
DB	21	Taylor Rapp	Fr
OLB	41	Myles Rice	Fr
DB	38	Hayden Schuh	Sr
DL	97	Jason Scrempos	Fr
OLB	37	Bryce Sterk	Fr
DB	35	Mason Stone	So
DT	66	Damion Turpin	Sr
S	24	Ezekiel Turner	Jr
DL	50	Vita Vea	So
DB	39	Sean Vergara	So
LB	36	Azeem Victor	Jr
S	27	Trevor Walker	Jr
LB	53	Jake Wambaugh	So
LB	10	Jusstis Warren	Fr
LB	13	Brandon Wellington	Fr
OLB	16	Amandre Williams	Fr
OLB	28	Psalm Wooching	Sr

Special teams

Pos.	#	Name	Class
LS	49	AJ Carty	Fr
LS	51	Luke Hutchinson	Jr
LS	78	Luke Lane	Fr
P	46	Race Porter	Fr
P	42	Van Soderberg	Fr
PK	81	Sebastian Valerio	Fr
PK	48	Cameron Van Winkle	Sr
P/PK	43	Tristan Vizcaino	Jr

Head coach

- Chris Petersen
  3rd year at Washington
  alma mater: UC Davis

Coordinators/assistant coaches

- Keith Bhonapha
  running backs/recruiting coordinator
  3rd year at Washington
  alma mater: Hawaii
- Bob Gregory
  assistant head coach/linebackers/special teams coordinator
  3rd year at Washington
  alma mater: Washington State
- Pete Kwiatkowski
  co-defensive coordinator
  3rd year at Washington
  alma mater: Boise State
- Jimmy Lake
  co-defensive coordinator/defensive backs
  3rd year at Washington
  alma mater: Eastern Washington
- Jordan Paopao
  tight ends
  6th year at Washington
  alma mater: San Diego
- Bush Hamdan
  receivers
  2nd year at Washington
  alma mater: Boise State
- Ikaika Malloe
  defensive line
  1st year at Washington
  alma mater: Washington
- Jonathan Smith
  offensive coordinator/quarterbacks
  3rd year at Washington
  alma mater: Oregon State
- Chris Strausser
  offensive line
  3rd year at Washington
  alma mater: Chico State
- Tim Socha
  strength and conditioning Coach
- Rich Rasmussen
  director of player personnel
- Jeff Tedford
  consultant
- Derham Cato
  offensive quality control
- Terrence Brown
  graduate assistant
- Kyle Jolly
  graduate assistant
- Kirby Moore
  graduate assistant
- Hansen Sekona
  graduate assistant

Legend

- (C) Team captain
- (S) Suspended
- (I) Ineligible
- Injured
- Redshirt

Roster
Last update: September 8, 2016

== Schedule ==
Date	Time	Opponent	Rank	Site	TV	Result	Attendance
September 3	11:00 a.m.	Rutgers*	No. 14	Husky Stadium; Seattle, WA	P12N	W 48–13	58,640
September 10	2:00 p.m.	Idaho*	No. 8	Husky Stadium; Seattle, WA	P12N	W 59–14	60,678
September 17	5:00 p.m.	No. 19 (FCS) Portland State*	No. 8	Husky Stadium; Seattle, WA	P12N	W 41–3	57,151
September 24	7:30 p.m.	at Arizona	No. 9	Arizona Stadium; Tucson, AZ	P12N	W 35–28 ^{OT}	48,747
September 30	6:00 p.m.	No. 7 Stanford	No. 10	Husky Stadium; Seattle, WA	ESPN	W 44–6	72,027
October 8	4:30 p.m.	at Oregon	No. 5	Autzen Stadium; Eugene, OR (rivalry)	FOX	W 70–21	58,842
October 22	3:30 p.m.	Oregon State^{†}	No. 5	Husky Stadium; Seattle, WA	P12N	W 41–17	65,796
October 29	12:30 p.m.	at No. 17 Utah	No. 4	Rice-Eccles Stadium; Salt Lake City, UT (College GameDay)	FS1	W 31–24	47,801
November 5	7:30 p.m.	at California	No. 5	California Memorial Stadium; Berkeley, CA	ESPN	W 66–27	47,756
November 12	4:30 p.m.	No. 20 USC	No. 4	Husky Stadium; Seattle, WA (College GameDay)	FOX	L 13–26	72,362
November 19	4:30 p.m.	Arizona State	No. 6	Husky Stadium; Seattle, WA	FOX	W 44–18	65,467
November 25	12:30 p.m.	at No. 23 Washington State	No. 5	Martin Stadium; Pullman, WA (Apple Cup)	FOX	W 45–17	33,773
December 2	6:00 p.m.	vs. No. 8 Colorado	No. 4	Levi's Stadium; Santa Clara, CA (Pac-12 Championship Game)	FOX	W 41–10	47,118
December 31	12:00 p.m.	vs. No. 1 Alabama*	No. 4	Georgia Dome; Atlanta, GA (Peach Bowl–CFP Semifinal, SEC Nation)	ESPN	L 7–24	75,996
*Non-conference game; ^{†}Homecoming; Rankings from AP Poll and CFP Rankings after November 1 released prior to game; All times are in Pacific time; Source:

== Rankings ==
Ranking movements Legend: ██ Increase in ranking ██ Decrease in ranking
	Week															
Poll	Pre	1	2	3	4	5	6	7	8	9	10	11	12	13	14	Final
AP	14	8	8	9	10	5	5	5	4	4	4	7	6	4	4	4
Coaches	18	11	9	9	9	6	5	5	4	4	4	7	5	4	4	4
CFP	Not released									5	4	6	5	4	4	Not released

== Game summaries ==
=== Rutgers ===
Rutgers Scarlet Knights at Washington Huskies – Game summary

Quarter	1	2	3	4	Total
Rutgers	0	3	0	10	13
No. 14 Washington	24	10	14	0	48

at Husky Stadium • Seattle, WA

- Date: September 3, 2016
- Game time: 11:01 a.m.
- Game weather: Temperature: 60° • Weather: Overcast with slight drizzle • Wind: SSW @ 8 mph
- Game attendance: 58,640
- Referee: Michael Batlan
- TV announcers (Pac-12 Network): Roxy Bernstein, Anthony Herron and Lewis Johnson

Game information

Top passers

- RU – Chris Laviano, 40 attempts, 24 completions, 168 yards, 1 interception
- UW – Jake Browning, 27 attempts, 18 completions, 287 yards, 3 touchdowns, 1 interception

Top rushers

- RU – Josh Hicks, 14 carries, 70 yards
- UW – Myles Gaskin, 15 carries 57 yards

Top receiving

- RU – Janarion Grant, 9 receptions, 56 yards
- UW – John Ross, 5 receptions, 90 yards, 2 touchdowns

=== Idaho ===
Idaho Vandals at Washington Huskies – Game summary

Quarter	1	2	3	4	Total
Idaho	0	0	7	7	14
No. 8 Washington	7	28	14	10	59

at Husky Stadium • Seattle, WA

- Date: September 10, 2016
- Game time: 2:07 p.m.
- Game weather: Temperature: 74° • Weather: Sunny with scattered clouds • Wind: W @ 8 mph
- Game attendance: 60,678
- Referee: Terry Leyden
- TV announcers (Pac-12 Network): J.B. Long, Glenn Parker and Jill Savage

Game information

First quarter

- WASH – Dante Pettis 21-yard pass from Jake Browning (Cameron Van Winkle kick), 14:44. Huskies 7–0. Drive: 1 play, 21 yards, 0:10.

Second quarter

- WASH – Dante Pettis 7-yard pass from Jake Browning (Cameron Van Winkle kick), 12:09. Huskies 14–0. Drive: 5 plays, 41 yards, 1:25.
- WASH – Chico McClatcher 30-yard pass from Jake Browning (Cameron Van Winkle kick), 7:37. Huskies 21–0. Drive: 6 plays, 85 yards, 2:20.
- WASH – Myles Gaskin 7-yard run (Cameron Van Winkle kick), 3:25. Huskies 28–0. Drive: 6 plays, 45 yards, 2:11.
- WASH – John Ross III 9-yard pass from Jake Browning (Cameron Van Winkle kick), 1:00. Huskies 35–0. Drive: 7 plays, 72 yards, 1:02.

Third quarter

- WASH – John Ross III 8-yard pass from Jake Browning (Cameron Van Winkle kick), 12:05. Huskies 42–0. Drive: 6 plays, 65 yards, 2:55.
- IDHO – Trent Cowan 20-yard pass from Matt Linehan (Austin Rehkow kick), 4:44. Huskies 42–7. Drive: 8 plays, 80 yards, 3:09.
- WASH – Quinten Pounds 26-yard pass from K. J. Carta-Samuels (Cameron Van Winkle kick), 2:13. Huskies 49–7. Drive: 5 plays, 49 yards, 2:24.

Fourth quarter

- IDHO – Gunnar Amos 6-yard run (Austin Rehkow kick), 10:41. Huskies 49–14. Drive: 15 plays, 75 yards, 6:32.
- WASH – Cameron Van Winkle 34-yard field goal, 5:21. Huskies 52–14. Drive: 10 plays, 47 yards, 5:11.
- WASH – Connor O'Brien 46-yard interception return (Cameron Van Winkle kick), 3:05. Huskies 59–14.

Top passers

- UI – Matt Linehan, 29 attempts, 19 completions, 187 yards, 1 touchdown
- UW – Jake Browning, 28 attempts, 23 completions, 294 yards, 5 touchdowns

Top rushers

- UI – Mason Petrino, 9 carries, 48 yards
- UW – Myles Gaskin, 12 carries 67 yards, 1 touchdown

Top receiving

- UI – Isaiah Saunders, 2 receptions, 54 yards
- UW – Dante Pettis, 6 receptions, 88 yards, 2 touchdowns

=== Portland State ===
Portland State Vikings at Washington Huskies – Game summary

Quarter	1	2	3	4	Total
No. 19 (FCS) Portland State	0	0	3	0	3
No. 8 Washington	14	14	0	13	41

at Husky Stadium • Seattle, WA

- Date: September 17, 2016
- Game time: 5:06 p.m.
- Game weather: Temperature: 66° • Weather: Mostly cloudy • Wind: SW @ 19 mph
- Game attendance: 57,151
- Referee: Chris Coyte
- TV announcers (Pac-12 Network):
  Jim Watson, Yogi Roth and Cindy Brunson

Game information

Top passers

- PSU – Alex Kuresa, 17 attempts, 11 completions, 148 yards, 1 interception
- UW – Jake Browning, 19 attempts, 12 completions, 163 yards, 4 touchdowns

Top rushers

- PSU – Nate Tago, 12 carries, 20 yards
- UW – Myles Gaskin, 13 carries, 93 yards, 1 touchdown

Top receiving

- PSU – Maximo Espitia, 4 receptions, 75 yards
- UW – Chico McClatcher, 4 receptions, 69 yards, 2 touchdowns

=== At Arizona ===
Washington Huskies at Arizona Wildcats – Game summary

Quarter	1	2	3	4	OT	Total
No. 9 Washington	0	14	7	7	7	35
Arizona	7	7	0	14	0	28

at Arizona Stadium • Tucson, AZ

- Date: September 24, 2016
- Game time: 7:31 p.m.
- Game weather: Temperature: 74° • Weather: Clear skies • Wind: NNW @ 9 mph
- Game attendance: 48,747
- Referee: Michael Mothershed
- TV announcers (Pac-12 Network): Roxy Bernstein, Anthony Herron and Lewis Johnson

Game information

Top passers

- UW – Jake Browning, 21 attempts, 14 completions, 160 yards, 2 touchdowns, 1 interception
- UA – Brandon Dawkins, 31 attempts, 19 completions, 167 yards, 1 touchdown, 1 interception

Top rushers

- UW – Lavon Coleman, 11 carries, 181 yards, 1 touchdown
- UA – Brandon Dawkins, 13 carries, 176 yards, 2 touchdowns

Top receiving

- UW – Chico McClatcher, 2 receptions, 72 yards
- UA – Shun Brown, 7 receptions, 114 yards

=== Stanford ===
Stanford Cardinal at Washington Huskies – Game summary

Quarter	1	2	3	4	Total
No. 7 Stanford	0	0	6	0	6
No. 10 Washington	13	10	7	14	44

at Husky Stadium • Seattle, WA

- Date: September 30, 2016
- Game time: 6:01 p.m.
- Game weather: Temperature: 64° • Weather: Clear skies • Wind: E @ 3 mph
- Game attendance: 72,027
- Referee: Mark Duddy
- TV announcers (ESPN): Joe Tessitore, Todd Blackledge and Holly Rowe

Game information

Top passers

- SU – Ryan Burns, 22 attempts, 15 completions, 151 yards, 1 touchdown
- UW – Jake Browning, 21 attempts, 15 completions, 210 yards, 3 touchdowns

Top rushers

- SU – Christian McCaffrey, 12 attempts, 49 yards
- UW – Myles Gaskin, 18 attempts, 100 yards, 2 touchdowns

Top receiving

- SU – Trenton Irwin, 3 receptions, 67 yards
- UW – John Ross, 4 receptions, 82 yards, 1 touchdown

=== At Oregon ===
Washington Huskies at Oregon Ducks – Game summary

Quarter	1	2	3	4	Total
No. 5 Washington	21	14	21	14	70
Oregon	0	7	14	0	21

at Autzen Stadium • Eugene, OR

- Date: October 8, 2016
- Game time: 4:35 p.m.
- Game weather: Temperature: 70° • Weather: Mostly sunny • Wind: S @ 5 mph
- Game attendance: 58,842
- Referee: Michael Mothershed
- TV announcers (FOX): Joe Davis, Brady Quinn and Jenny Taft

Game information

Top passers

- UW – Jake Browning, 28 attempts, 22 completions, 304 yards, 6 touchdowns
- UO – Justin Herbert, 34 attempts, 21 completions, 179 yards, 2 touchdowns, 1 interception

Top rushers

- UW – Myles Gaskin, 16 carries, 197 yards, 1 touchdown
- UO – Taj Griffin, 7 carries, 60 yards, 1 touchdown

Top receiving

- UW – Dante Pettis, 8 receptions, 134 yards, 2 touchdowns
- UO – Darren Carrington, 3 receptions, 47 yards

Coming off of a 44–6 win against No. 7 Stanford at Husky Stadium, No. 5 Washington traveled to Autzen Stadium to face a 2–3 Oregon team. Prior to this game, Oregon had beaten Washington twelve straight times, ten of which were by a margin of 20 points or more. This was the longest winning streak by either team in the Oregon–Washington football rivalry.

The Oregon winning streak was finally snapped after a 70–21 Washington rout. On the first play from the line of scrimmage, Washington safety Budda Baker, a one-time commit to the Oregon Ducks, intercepted the pass from Oregon's true freshman Justin Herbert. The Huskies took the lead on a Jake Browning touchdown run with 13:23 left in the first quarter and never relinquished it. The Huskies led 35–7 by halftime, 42–7 after the first possession of the third quarter, and 70–21 with 9:58 left in the fourth quarter.

The Washington offense racked up 682 yards of total offense, averaged 10.1 yards per play, amassed 6 passing touchdowns by quarterback Jake Browning, and scored 70 points, the most scored by either team in the rivalry. The Huskies’ 70 points were the second-most an opponent has ever scored on Oregon in Eugene.

=== Oregon State ===
Oregon State Beavers at Washington Huskies – Game summary

Quarter	1	2	3	4	Total
Oregon State	0	0	10	7	17
No. 5 Washington	21	10	10	0	41

at Husky Stadium • Seattle, WA

- Date: October 22, 2016
- Game time: 3:41 p.m.
- Game weather: Temperature: 63°• Weather: Scattered clouds • Wind: N @ 8 mph
- Game attendance: 65,796
- Referee: Terry Leyden
- TV announcers (Pac-12 Network): Ted Robinson, Yogi Roth and Cindy Brunson

Game information

Top passers

- OSU – Marcus McMaryion, 26 attempts, 12 completions, 148 yards, 2 interceptions
- UW – Jake Browning, 28 attempts, 14 completions, 291 yards, 3 touchdowns

Top rushers

- OSU – Tim Cook, 18 carries, 108 yards, 1 touchdown
- UW – Myles Gaskin, 18 carries, 128 yards, 1 touchdown

Top receiving

- OSU – Victor Bolden, 5 receptions, 58 yards
- UW – John Ross, 4 receptions, 115 yards

=== At Utah ===
Washington Huskies at Utah Utes – Game summary

Quarter	1	2	3	4	Total
No. 4 Washington	7	7	7	10	31
No. 17 Utah	0	10	7	7	24

at Rice-Eccles Stadium • Salt Lake City, UT

- Date: October 29, 2016
- Game time: 12:40 p.m.
- Game weather: Temperature: 69° • Weather: Partly cloudy • Wind: SSE @ 8 mph
- Game attendance: 47,801
- Referee: Mark Duddy
- TV announcers (FS1): Gus Johnson, Joel Klatt and Shannon Spake

Game information

Top passers

- UW – Jake Browning, 20 attempts, 12 completions, 186 yards, 2 touchdowns, 1 interception
- UU – Troy Williams, 31 attempts, 14 completions, 163 yards, 2 touchdowns

Top rushers

- UW – Myles Gaskin, 19 carries, 151 yards, 1 touchdown
- UU – Joe Williams, 35 carries, 172 yards, 1 touchdown

Top receiving

- UW – Darrell Daniels, 2 receptions, 57 yards
- UU – Tim Patrick, 5 receptions, 72 yards

=== At California ===
Washington Huskies at California Golden Bears – Game summary

Quarter	1	2	3	4	Total
No. 4 Washington	21	14	21	10	66
California	13	7	0	7	27

at California Memorial Stadium • Berkeley, CA

- Date: November 5, 2016
- Game time: 7:41 p.m.
- Game weather: Temperature: 61° • Weather: Scattered clouds • Wind: SSW @ 6 mph
- Game attendance: 47,756
- Referee: Michael Batian
- TV announcers (ESPN): Mark Jones, Rod Gilmore and Quint Kessenich

Game information

Top passers

- UW – Jake Browning, 28 attempts, 19 completions, 378 yards, 6 touchdowns
- CAL – Davis Webb, 47 attempts, 23 completions, 262 yards, 1 touchdown, 3 interceptions

Top rushers

- UW – Lavon Coleman, 7 carries, 108 yards, 1 touchdown
- CAL – Khalfani Muhammad, 8 carries, 34 yards

Top receiving

- UW – John Ross, 6 receptions, 208 yards, 3 touchdowns
- CAL – Demetris Robertson, 3 receptions 80 yards

=== USC ===
USC Trojans at Washington Huskies – Game summary

Quarter	1	2	3	4	Total
No. 20 USC	3	14	0	9	26
No. 4 Washington	3	3	7	0	13

at Husky Stadium • Seattle, WA

- Date: November 12, 2016
- Game time: 4:36 p.m.
- Game weather: Temperature: 56° • Weather: Mostly cloudy • Wind: SSW @ 15 mph
- Game attendance: 72,362
- Referee: Terry Leyden
- TV announcers (FOX): Gus Johnson, Joel Klatt and Shannon Spake

Game information

Top passers

- USC –
- UW –

Top rushers

- USC –
- UW –

Top receiving

- USC –
- UW –

=== Arizona State ===
Arizona State Sun Devils at Washington Huskies – Game summary

Quarter	1	2	3	4	Total
Arizona State	0	0	3	15	18
No. 7 Washington	3	21	6	14	44

at Husky Stadium • Seattle, WA

- Date: November 19, 2016
- Game time: 4:40 p.m.
- Game weather: Temperature: 54° • Weather: Mostly cloudy • Wind: N @ 5 mph
- Game attendance: 65,467
- Referee: Land Clark
- TV announcers (FOX): Joe Davis, Brady Quinn and Jenny Taft

Game information

Top passers

- ASU –
- UW –

Top rushers

- ASU –
- UW –

Top receiving

- ASU –
- UW –

=== At Washington State ===
Washington Huskies at Washington State Cougars – Game summary

Quarter	1	2	3	4	Total
No. 6 Washington	28	7	0	10	45
No. 23 Washington State	3	7	7	0	17

at Martin Stadium • Pullman, WA

- Date: November 25, 2016
- Game time: 12:35 p.m.
- Game weather: Temperature: 44° • Weather: Slight rain • Wind: S @ 7 mph
- Game attendance: 33,773
- Referee: Steve Strimling
- TV announcers (FOX): Gus Johnson, Joel Klatt and Shannon Spake

Game information

Top passers

- UW –
- WSU –

Top rushers

- UW –
- WSU –

Top receiving

- UW –
- WSU –

=== vs Colorado (Pac-12 Championship Game) ===
Pac-12 Championship Game – Game summary

Quarter	1	2	3	4	Total
No. 9 Colorado	7	0	3	0	10
No. 4 Washington	7	7	17	10	41

at Levi's Stadium • Santa Clara, CA

- Date: December 2, 2016
- Game time: 6:22 p.m.
- Game weather: Temperature: 60° • Weather: Clear skies • Wind: NW @ 10 mph
- Game attendance: 47,118
- Referee: Land Clark
- TV announcers (FOX): Joe Davis, Brady Quinn, Jenny Taft and Chris Myers

Game information

Top passers

- UW –
- CU –

Top rushers

- UW –
- CU –

Top receiving

- UW –
- CU –

=== vs Alabama (Peach Bowl - CFP Semifinal) ===
Peach Bowl (CFP Semifinal) – Game summary

Quarter	1	2	3	4	Total
No. 4 Washington	7	0	0	0	7
No. 1 Alabama	7	10	0	7	24

at Georgia Dome • Atlanta, GA

- Date: December 31, 2016
- Game time: 12:00 p.m.
- Game weather: Indoors (dome stadium)
- Game attendance: 75,996
- Referee: Dan Capron
- TV announcers (ESPN): Joe Tessitore, Todd Blackledge and Holly Rowe

Game information

Top passers

- UW – Jake Browning, 38 attempts, 20 completions, 150 yards,1 touchdown
- UA – Jalen Hurts, 14 attempts, 7 completions, 57 yards

Top rushers

- UW – Myles Gaskin, 10 carries, 34 yards
- UA – Bo Scarbrough, 19 carries, 180 yards, 2 touchdowns

Top receiving

- UW – Myles Gaskin, 5 receptions, 40 yards
- UA – O. J. Howard, 4 receptions, 44 yards

== Awards and honors ==
=== Coaches ===
Chris Petersen - Head Coach

- Eddie Robinson Coach of the Year : Finalist
- Bobby Dodd Coach of the Year Award : Finalist

Tim Socha - strength and conditioning coach

- FootballScoop.com strength and conditioning coach of the Year : Winner

=== Offense ===
Jake Browning - Quarterback - Sophomore

- Manning Award (quarterback) : Finalist
- Walter Camp Award (player of the year) : Finalist
- Davey O'Brien Award (quarterback) : Semi-Finalist
- Maxwell Award (player of the year) : Semi-Finalist

John Ross III - Wide receiver - (redshirt) Junior

- Biletnikoff Award (wide receiver) : Semi-Finalist

Jeff Lindquist - Tight end - (redshirt) Senior

- Wuerffel Trophy (community service and academic excellence) : Semi-Finalist

=== Defense ===
Budda Baker - Safety - Junior

- Chuck Bednarik Award (defensive player of the year) : Semi-Finalist
- Lott IMPACT Trophy (defensive player of the year) : Semi-Finalist
- Jim Thorpe Award (defensive back) : Semi-Finalist

=== All-Americans ===
First team

- Budda Baker - The Sporting News, FWAA, ESPN, Sports Illustrated
- John Ross III - ESPN

Second team

- Budda Baker - AFCA, The Associated Press, CBS Sports
- Sidney Jones - Sports Illustrated
- John Ross III - FWAA, The Associated Press, CBS Sports
- Trey Adams - FWAA

Freshman

- Taylor Rapp - FWAA, USA Today, ESPN, Pro Football Focus

=== All-Pac-12 Individual awards ===
Offensive Player of the Year

- Jake Browning - Quarterback - Sophomore

Freshman Defensive Player of the Year

- Taylor Rapp - Safety - Freshman

Football Scholar-Athlete of the Year

- Jake Eldrenkamp - Guard - (redshirt) Senior

=== Pac-12 All-Conference Team ===
First team

- Jake Browning - Quarterback - Sophomore
- Myles Gaskin - Running back - Sophomore
- John Ross III - Wide receiver - (redshirt) Junior
- Trey Adams - Offensive tackle - Sophomore
- Jake Eldrenkamp - Guard - (redshirt) Senior
- Elijah Qualls - Defensive tackle - (redshirt) Junior
- Azeem Victor - Linebacker - (redshirt) Junior
- Budda Baker - Safety - (redshirt) Junior
- Sidney Jones - Cornerback - (redshirt) Junior

Second team

- Coleman Shelton - Center - (redshirt) Junior
- Vita Vea - Defensive tackle - (redshirt) Sophomore
- Keishawn Bierria - Linebacker - (redshirt) Junior
- Dante Pettis - Return specialist - (redshirt) Junior

Honorable mention

- Darrell Daniels - Tight end - Senior
- Greg Gaines - Defensive tackle - (redshirt) Sophomore
- Kevin King - Cornerback - Senior
- Drew Sample - Tight end - (redshirt) Sophomore
- Psalm Wooching - Linebacker - (redshirt) Senior

== NFL draft ==
=== NFL Scouting Combine ===
Seven members of the 2016 team were invited to participate in drills at the 2017 NFL Scouting Combine held between February 28 and March 6, 2017 at Lucas Oil Stadium in Indianapolis, Indiana.

#	Name	POS	HT	WT	Arms	Hands	40	Bench press	Vert jump	Broad jump	3-cone drill	20-yd shuttle	60-yd shuttle	Ref
DB04	Budda Baker	S	5'10"	195	30 3/4"	9"	4.45*	15 reps	32.5"	115"	6.76*	4.08*	N/A	
TE04	Darrell Daniels	TE	6'3"	247	34 1/2"	10 1/4"	4.55*	17 reps	32"	116"	7.09	4.47	N/A	
DB28	Sidney Jones	CB	6'0"	186	31 1/2"	9 3/8"	4.47	N/A	33.5"	123"	7.02	4.28	N/A	
DB31	Kevin King	CB	6'3"	200	32"	9 1/2"	4.43	11 reps	39.5"*	N/A	6.56*	3.89*	11.14*	
LB20	Joe Mathis	OLB	6'2"	266	33"	9"	N/A	24 reps*	N/A	N/A	N/A	N/A	N/A	
DL39	Elijah Qualls	DT	6'1"	313	30 5/8"	9 3/8"	5.13	33 reps*	31.5"	105"	7.65	4.66	N/A	
WO42	John Ross III	WR	5'11"	188	31 1/2"	8 3/4"	4.22†	N/A	37"	133"*	N/A	N/A	N/A	

* Top performer

† New combine record

=== 2017 NFL draft ===
The 2017 NFL draft was held at the Philadelphia Museum of Art in Philadelphia on April 27 through April 29, 2017. The following Washington players were either selected or signed as free agents following the draft.

Player	Position	Round	Overall pick	NFL team
John Ross III	WR	1	9	Cincinnati Bengals
Kevin King	CB	2	33	Green Bay Packers
Budda Baker	S	2	36	Arizona Cardinals
Sidney Jones	CB	2	43	Philadelphia Eagles
Elijah Qualls	DT	6	214	Philadelphia Eagles
Brandon Beaver	S	UDFA	—	Arizona Cardinals
Darrell Daniels	TE	UDFA	—	Indianapolis Colts
Jake Eldrenkamp	OG	UDFA	—	Los Angeles Rams
Joe Mathis	OLB	UDFA	—	Houston Texans
