= 2016 Peach Bowl =

College Football Playoff Semifinal bowl game

2016 Chick-fil-A Peach Bowl
- College Football Playoff Semifinal; 49th Peach Bowl
- 2016 Peach Bowl logo
Washington Huskies	Alabama Crimson Tide
(12–1)	(13–0)
Pac-12	SEC
7	24
Head coach: Chris Petersen	Head coach: Nick Saban
AP / Coaches / CFP; 4 / 4 / 4	AP / Coaches / CFP; 1 / 1 / 1
	1	2	3	4	Total
Washington	7	0	0	0	7
Alabama	7	10	0	7	24
- Date: December 31, 2016
- Season: 2016
- Stadium: Georgia Dome
- Location: Atlanta, Georgia
- MVP: Bo Scarbrough (RB, Alabama); Ryan Anderson (LB, Alabama
- Favorite: Alabama by 13
- Referee: Dan Capron (Big Ten)
- Halftime show: Million Dollar Band; University of Washington Husky Marching Band
- Attendance: 75,996

United States TV coverage
- Network: ESPN
- Announcers: Joe Tessitore (play-by-play); Todd Blackledge (analyst); Holly Rowe (sideline)
- Nielsen ratings: 11.5 (19.8 million viewers)

International TV coverage
- Network: ESPN Deportes
- Announcers: Kenneth Garay, Alex Pombo, Sebastian Martinez-Christensen

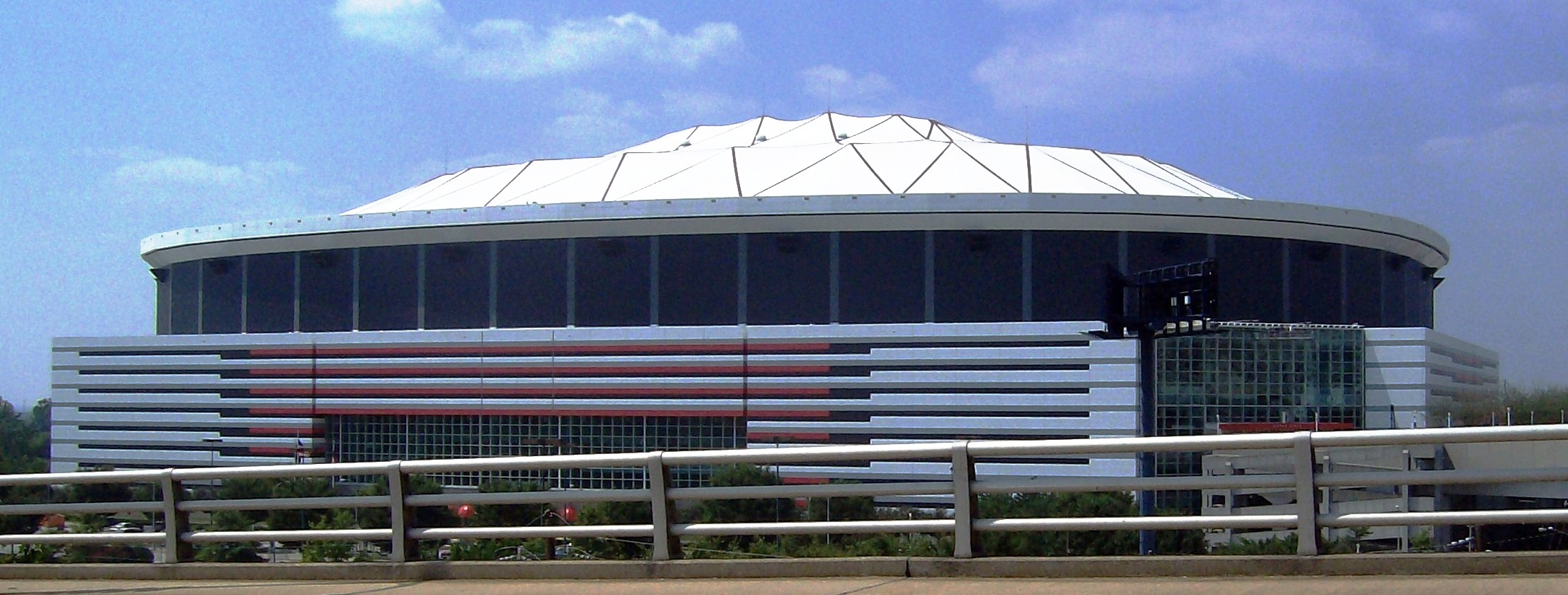
The Georgia Dome in Atlanta, Georgia, hosted the Peach Bowl for the last time before its move to Mercedes-Benz Stadium.

The 2016 Peach Bowl (officially known as the College Football Playoff Semifinal at the 2016 Chick-fil-A Peach Bowl for sponsorship reasons) was a college football bowl game played on December 31, 2016, at the Georgia Dome in Atlanta, Georgia. The game was the 49th playing of the Peach Bowl and the first semifinal of the 2016–17 College Football Playoff (CFP), part of the slate of bowl games concluding the 2016 FBS football season. The game featured two of the four teams chosen by the CFP selection committee: the No. 1 Alabama Crimson Tide from the Southeastern Conference (SEC) and the No. 4 Washington Huskies from the Pac-12 Conference. The winner qualified for the 2017 College Football Playoff National Championship against the winner of the other semifinal, hosted by the Fiesta Bowl. The game was televised on ESPN with a radio broadcast on ESPN Radio.

This was the last college football game played in the Georgia Dome, which was replaced by Mercedes-Benz Stadium and demolished in February 2017.

== Teams ==
On December 4, 2016, the CFP Semifinals were announced, with No. 1 Alabama vs. No. 4 Washington playing in the Peach Bowl.

This was the fifth meeting between the schools, with Alabama having won all four previous encounters. Their most recent meeting was at the 1986 Sun Bowl, where the Crimson Tide defeated the Huskies by a score of 28–6.

This was the first bowl game between a Pac-12 team and an SEC team (or a predecessor conference) since the 2011 BCS National Championship Game when the Auburn Tigers defeated the Oregon Ducks by a score of 22–19 on a last-second field goal, and the second since the 1989 Freedom Bowl when the Washington Huskies defeated the Florida Gators 34–7. This was also Alabama's first appearance in the Peach Bowl, as well the first appearance of a Pac-12 team (although Arizona State appeared in the 1970 Peach Bowl as a member of the Western Athletic Conference).

== Game summary ==
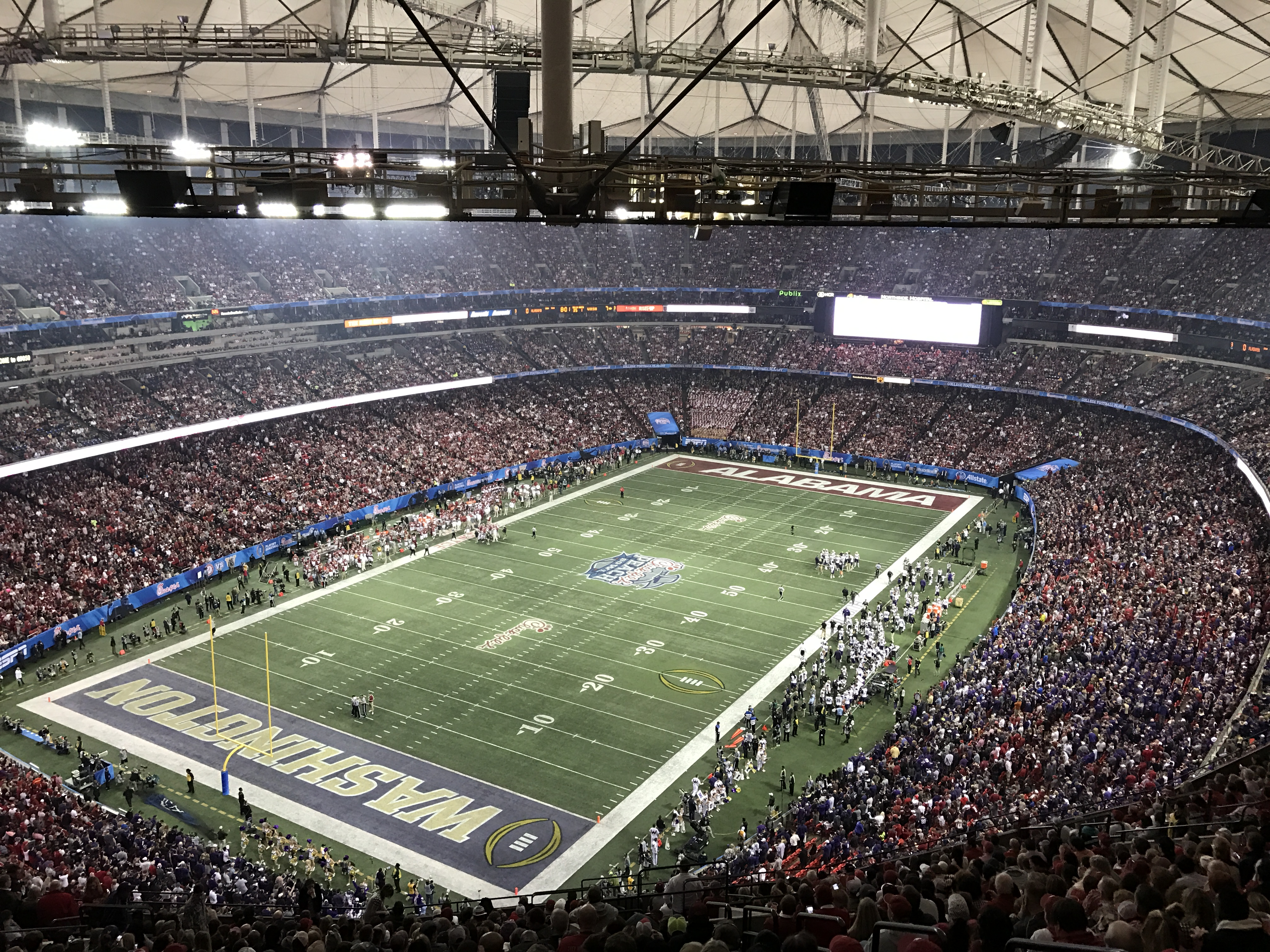
View of the game from the upper deck of the Georgia Dome

Both teams went three-and-out to start the game. Washington scored a touchdown on an eight-play, 64-yard drive that culminated in a 16-yard receiving touchdown pass from Jake Browning to Dante Pettis to make the score 7–0. Alabama answered on a nine-play, 78-yard drive that resulted in a Bo Scarbrough 18-yard rushing touchdown to tie the game. On the next drive, Washington got one first down before a John Ross fumble gave the ball to the Crimson Tide on the Washington 40-yard line. Alabama ran six plays for 17 yards and scored on an Adam Griffith 41-yard field goal to make the score 10–7. Washington and Alabama traded punts over the next six drives. On Washington's next drive, they earned a first down before Browning threw a pick six to Ryan Anderson, which was returned 26 yards for a touchdown to make it 17–7. On the next drive, Washington ran six plays to close out the first half. Alabama started the third quarter with the ball but punted. Washington went three-and-out on their first possession of the second half. The teams traded punts over four possessions before Alabama got the ball back early in the fourth quarter on their own 2-yard line. Alabama made it to their own 32-yard line over five plays, which included a 12-yard run from Scarborough and a 16-yard reception from O. J. Howard. On the next play, Scarborough broke free on a 68-yard rushing touchdown to make the score 24–7. The teams traded punts over the next three possessions. In an effort to run some clock, Alabama ran six plays and burned two of Washington's timeouts before turning the ball over on downs. On their final possession, Washington was able to get the ball into Alabama territory after a 16-yard reception and a 12-yard reception by Aaron Fuller. However, a sack by Rashaan Evans on Browning halted their momentum. On their final play, Browning was intercepted by Minkah Fitzpatrick. After committing two unsportsmanlike conduct penalties, Alabama ran out the clock on a kneel down to end the game with a 24–7 victory.

=== Scoring summary ===
College Football Playoff Semifinal at the 2015 Capital One Orange Bowl

Quarter	1	2	3	4	Total
No. 4 Washington	7	0	0	0	7
No. 1 Alabama	7	10	0	7	24

at Georgia Dome • Atlanta, Georgia

- Date: December 31, 2016
- Game time: 3:00 p.m. EST
- Game weather: n/a (game played indoors)
- Game attendance: 75,996
- Referee: Dan Capron (Big Ten)
- TV announcers (ESPN): Joe Tessitore (play-by-play), Todd Blackledge (analyst) and Holly Rowe (sideline)
- ESPN game summary

Scoring summary

Quarter	Time	Drive			Team	Scoring information	Score	
Quarter	Time	Plays	Yards	TOP	Team	Scoring information	Washington	Alabama
1	8:01	8	64	3:52	Washington	Dante Pettis 16-yard touchdown reception from Jake Browning, Cameron Van Winkle kick good	7	0
1	5:01	9	78	3:00	Alabama	Bo Scarbrough 18-yard touchdown run, Adam Griffith kick good	7	7
2	14:55	6	17	2:27	Alabama	41-yard field goal by Adam Griffith	7	10
2	1:13	6	28	1:03	Alabama	Interception returned 26 yards for touchdown by Ryan Anderson, Adam Griffith kick good	7	17
4	11:56	6	98	2:54	Alabama	Bo Scarbrough 68-yard touchdown run, Adam Griffith kick good	7	24
"TOP" = time of possession. For other American football terms, see Glossary of American football.							7	24

== Statistics ==
Team statistical comparison
Statistic	Washington	Alabama
First downs	14	16
First downs rushing	6	13
First downs passing	8	3
First downs penalty	0	0
Third down efficiency	6–17	4–14
Fourth down efficiency	0–0	0–1
Total plays–net yards	67–194	64–326
Rushing attempts–net yards	29–44	50–269
Yards per rush	1.5	5.4
Yards passing	150	57
Pass completions–attempts	20–38	7–14
Interceptions thrown	2	0
Punt returns–total yards	2–5	1–3
Kickoff returns–total yards	3–47	2–45
Punts–average yardage	9–47.0	8–45.9
Fumbles–lost	2–1	1–0
Penalties–yards	3–10	11–66
Time of possession	29:15	30:45

Washington statistics
Huskies passing
	C–A	Yds	TD–INT
Jake Browning	20–38	150	1–2
Huskies rushing
	Car	Yds	TD
Myles Gaskin	10	34	0
Lavon Coleman	7	16	0
Chico McClatcher	1	16	0
K. J. Carta-Samuels	1	3	0
Jomon Dotson	1	3	0
TEAM	1	−7	0
Jake Browning	8	−21	0
Huskies receiving
	Rec	Yds	TD
Myles Gaskin	5	40	0
John Ross	5	28	0
Aaron Fuller	2	27	0
Dante Pettis	3	26	1
Andre Baccellia	1	15	0
Quinten Pounds	1	12	0
Drew Sample	1	8	0
Chico McClatcher	2	−6	0

Alabama statistics
Crimson Tide passing
	C–A	Yds	TD–INT
Jalen Hurts	7–14	57	0–0
Crimson Tide rushing
	Car	Yds	TD
Bo Scarbrough	19	180	2
Jalen Hurts	19	50	0
Damien Harris	9	30	0
ArDarius Stewart	2	10	0
TEAM	1	−1	0
Crimson Tide receiving
	Rec	Yds	TD
O. J. Howard	4	44	0
Gehrig Dieter	1	10	0
Calvin Ridley	1	6	0
Josh Jacobs	1	−3	0
