= Connor Griffin =

American basketball player & coach

Brooklyn Nets
- Title: Assistant coach
- League: NBA

Personal information
- Born: Lake Oswego, Oregon, U.S.
- Listed height: 6 ft 3 in (1.91 m)
- Listed weight: 223 lb (101 kg)

Career information
- High school: Lake Oswego (Lake Oswego, Oregon)
- College: Gonzaga (2013–2015); Washington (2015–2016); Vanguard (2017–2018)
- Position: Small forward
- Coaching career: 2021–present

Career history

Coaching
- 2021–2022: Denver Nuggets (assistant VC)
- 2022–2024: Denver Nuggets (VC/player development)
- 2024–present: Brooklyn Nets (assistant)

Connor Griffin is an American professional basketball coach and former player who is an assistant coach for the Brooklyn Nets of the National Basketball Association (NBA).

== High school career ==
Griffin attended Lake Oswego High School, playing both football and basketball.

== College career ==
In college, Griffin would end up playing both football and basketball.

From 2013 to 2015, Griffin elected to play college basketball for the Gonzaga Bulldogs, despite receiving scholarship offers to play football. At Gonzaga, Griffin won two conference titles.

From 2015 to 2016, Griffin was a member of the Washington Huskies, playing college football as a tight end. While with the Huskies football program, he helped the team win the 2016 Pac-12 championship and earn a spot in the College Football Playoff.

Griffin later transferred again for the 2017–18 season, electing to play basketball at the NAIA level for Vanguard University.

== Coaching career ==
Griffin began his coaching career in the collegiate ranks, first starting at Pepperdine University as a graduate manager for the men's basketball team from 2018 to 2020 and then serving as video coordinator for both men's and women's basketball programs from 2020 to 2021.

In 2021, Griffin earned his first position coaching in the NBA. Griffin spent three seasons from 2021 to 2024 with the Denver Nuggets, spending the 2021–22 season as an assistant video coordinator and two seasons from 2022 to 2024 as head video coordinator/player development. He was a member of the Nuggets when the team won the 2023 NBA Finals and the Nuggets' first NBA championship.

On May 31, 2024, the Brooklyn Nets announced that Griffin would be named as an assistant coach under head coach Jordi Fernández.

== Personal life ==
Griffin is a native of Lake Oswego, Oregon.
