= John Ross (American football) =

American football player (born 1995)

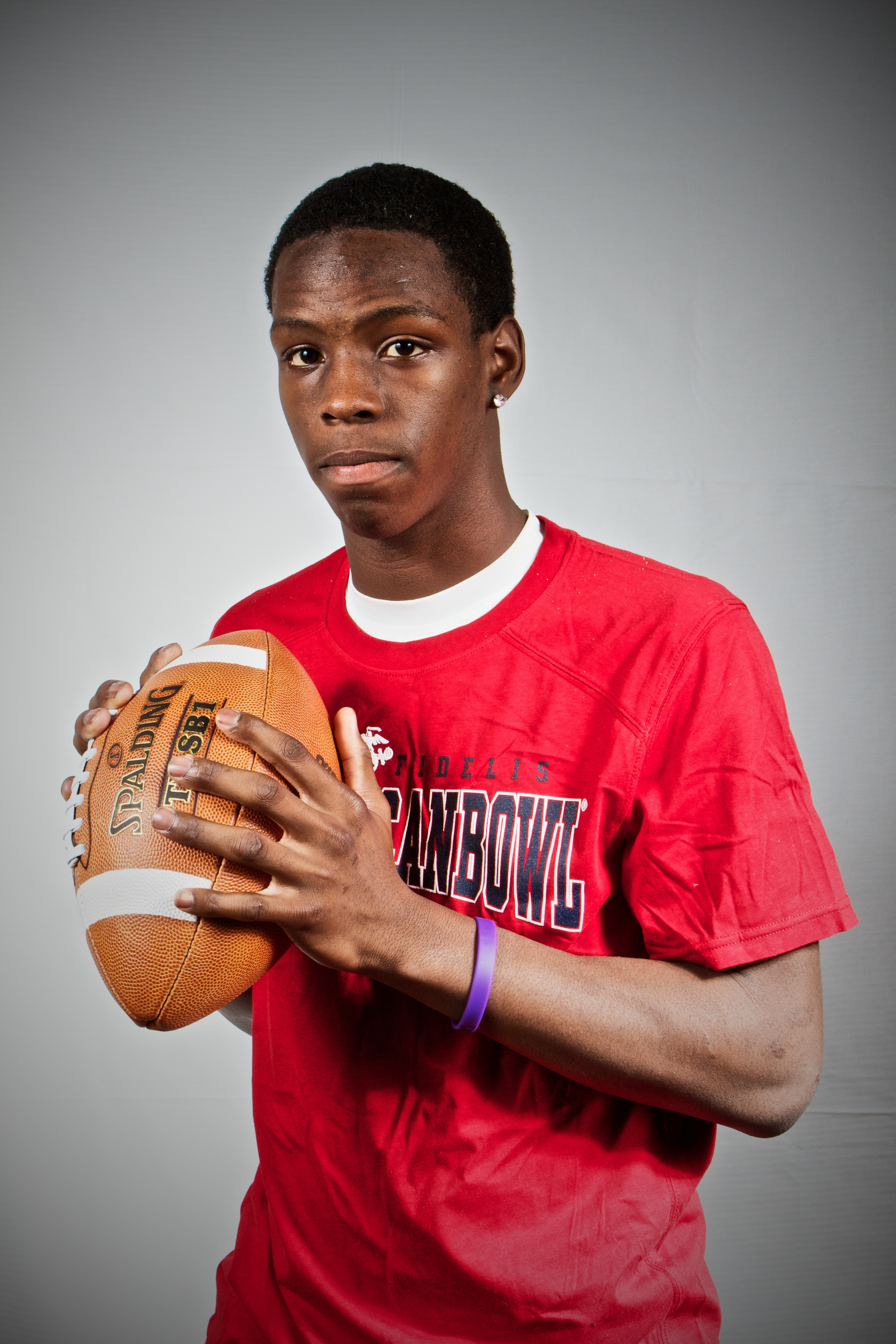
- Ross in 2012

Profile
- Position: Wide receiver

Personal information
- Born: November 27, 1995 (age 30); Long Beach, California, U.S.
- Listed height: 5 ft 11 in (1.80 m)
- Listed weight: 190 lb (86 kg)

Career information
- High school: Jordan (Long Beach)
- College: Washington (2013–2016)
- NFL draft: 2017: 1st round, 9th overall pick

Career history
- Cincinnati Bengals (2017–2020); New York Giants (2021); Kansas City Chiefs (2023)*; Philadelphia Eagles (2024); Birmingham Stallions (2026)
- * Offseason or practice squad member only

Awards and highlights
- First-team All-American (2016); NCAA kickoff return yards leader (2014); First-team All-Pac-12 (2016); Pac-12 Player of the Year (2016)

Career NFL statistics as of 2024
- Receptions: 63
- Receiving yards: 963
- Receiving touchdowns: 11
- Stats at Pro Football Reference

John Ellis Ross III (born November 27, 1995) is an American former professional football player who was a wide receiver in the National Football League (NFL). He played college football for the Washington Huskies and was selected ninth overall by the Cincinnati Bengals in the 2017 NFL draft. He held the record for the fastest recorded 40-yard dash at the NFL Combine with 4.22 seconds before being broken by Xavier Worthy's time of 4.21 seconds in 2024. Despite his record breaking speed, it didn't translate into success and he is considered one of the biggest disappointments after only playing 6 seasons in the NFL.

== Early life ==
As a child, Ross played in Snoop Dogg's All-Star league. Ross attended Jordan High School in Long Beach, California. He played wide receiver and cornerback in football and ran track. As a senior, Ross finished third in the 100 metres at the 2013 CIF Southern Section Division 1 final, with a time of 10.66 seconds. He also recorded a time of 21.56 seconds in the 200m.

Regarded as a four-star recruit by ESPN, Ross was ranked as the No. 49 overall prospect in the state of California. He committed to the University of Washington to play college football.

== College career ==
Ross played in all 13 games as a true freshman at Washington in 2013. He finished the year with 16 receptions for 208 yards and one touchdown as a receiver and had 720 kick return yards and a touchdown. In 2014, he played in 13 of 14 games, with seven starts as a receiver and four as a cornerback. That season, he had 17 receptions for 371 yards and four touchdowns as a receiver, 12 tackles and an interception as a cornerback, and had an NCAA-leading 938 kickoff return yards for two touchdowns. Ross missed the 2015 season after suffering a torn ACL during spring practices. Ross returned from the injury in 2016 and had five receptions for 90 yards with two receiving touchdowns and a kick return touchdown in his first game back against Rutgers. On January 3, 2017, Ross announced his decision to forego his senior season and enter the NFL draft. On February 10, 2017, it was revealed that Ross was diagnosed with a torn labrum in his shoulder. He injured his shoulder earlier during the 2016 season, and re-aggravated it on December 31 in a loss against Alabama in the 2016 Peach Bowl in the College Football Playoff. The injury required surgery, but Ross decided to put it on hold until after the NFL Scouting Combine and pro day workouts.

== Professional career ==
=== Pre-draft ===
Coming out of college, Ross was predicted to be selected in the first round by draft experts and analysts. He was considered one of the top wide receivers and was ranked the second best by NFL analyst Bucky Brooks before the combine. As a top wide receiver prospect, he received an invitation to the NFL Combine and broke Chris Johnson's 4.24 record time in the 40-yard dash. Ross finished with a 4.22, but strained his calves while pulling up at the end of his run. The calf injuries hindered his ability to complete all the set combine drills or run his second attempt at the 40-yard dash. Ross' 4.22 40 yard dash time would stand as the NFL Combine record for 7 years, broken by Xavier Worthy in 2024 with a 4.21. Ross attended Washington's Pro Day, but only ran positional drills. The next day, he had surgery to repair a torn labrum in his shoulder. He was ranked as the third best wide receiver prospect in the draft by ESPN and was ranked the second best wide receiver prospect by Sports Illustrated and NFLDraftScout.com.

External videos
- John Ross' NFL Combine workout
- John Ross' 40-yard dash
- Ross' NFL Combine Press Conference
- John Ross' Washington Pro Day workout

Pre-draft measurables
Height	Weight	Arm length	Hand span	40-yard dash	10-yard split	20-yard split	Vertical jump	Broad jump	Wonderlic
5 ft 10 3/4 in (1.80 m)	188 lb (85 kg)	31 1/2 in (0.80 m)	8 3/4 in (0.22 m)	4.22 s	1.46 s	2.47 s	37 in (0.94 m)	11 ft 1 in (3.38 m)	16
All values from NFL Combine

=== Cincinnati Bengals ===
==== 2017 season ====
The Cincinnati Bengals selected Ross in the first round (9th overall) of the 2017 NFL draft. He was the third wide receiver to be selected after Corey Davis and Mike Williams. On May 7, 2017, the Bengals signed Ross to a four-year, $17.1 million contract with a signing bonus of $10.6 million.

External videos
- Bengals select John Ross ninth overall
- John Ross' NFL Draft interview

Ross competed with Brandon LaFell, Cody Core, Tyler Boyd and Josh Malone throughout training camp to be the starting wide receiver alongside A. J. Green. Although he was a first round pick, head coach Marvin Lewis named him the sixth wide receiver on the depth chart to begin the regular season.

On September 14, 2017, Ross made his professional regular season debut on Thursday Night Football against the Houston Texans after missing the season-opener due to a knee injury. He fumbled his first and only carry of the game, and was subsequently benched after gaining only 12 rushing yards as the Bengals lost, 13–9. That carry proved to be his only touch of his rookie season, as he was only active for two out of the next 10 games and did not record any statistics. A knee injury caused him to miss Weeks 3–5 while the rest were healthy scratches. He was placed on injured reserve on December 4, 2017, with a shoulder injury, ending his rookie season. His debut season was variously described as "wasted", "disappointing" and "disastrous", with Lewis coming under some criticism for his management of Ross.

==== 2018 season ====
In the 2018 season opener against the Indianapolis Colts, Ross recorded his first professional touchdown on a three-yard reception in the 34–23 victory. In the 2018 season, Ross had 21 receptions for 210 receiving yards and seven receiving touchdowns.

==== 2019 season ====
During Week 1 against the Seattle Seahawks, Ross posted seven catches for 158 receiving yards and two touchdowns, but the Bengals lost a close game, 21–20. During Week 2 against the San Francisco 49ers, Ross finished with four catches for 112 receiving yards and a touchdown as the Bengals lost, 41–17. In only the first two games of the 2019 season, Ross compiled more receiving yards than his initial two NFL seasons combined. On October 2, 2019, the Bengals placed Ross on injured reserve as a result of his shoulder injury. He was designated for return from injured reserve on November 13, 2019, and began practicing with the team again. On December 3, 2019, Ross was activated from injured reserve. Overall, Ross finished the 2019 season with 28 receptions for 506 receiving yards and three receiving touchdowns.

==== 2020 season ====
On May 2, 2020, the Bengals declined the fifth-year option on Ross' contract, making him a free agent in 2021. He was placed on the reserve/COVID-19 list by the team on August 12, after he left training camp to tend to his son who tested positive for the virus. He was activated from the list on August 23. On October 30, 2020, Ross tweeted that "It's not a secret that I have requested a trade." Despite Ross' statement, he was not traded by the NFL trade deadline. He had been placed on the Bengals' inactive list four of the Bengals previous five games as a "healthy scratch" before he was placed on injured reserve on November 14, 2020, after suffering a foot injury in practice. He finished the season playing in three games recording only two receptions for 17 yards and zero touchdowns.

=== New York Giants ===
On March 19, 2021, Ross signed a one-year $2.5 million contract with the New York Giants. He was placed on injured reserve on September 1, 2021, to start the season. He was activated on October 2. In a week 4 game against the New Orleans Saints, Ross saw his first playing time of the season due to injuries to wide receivers Sterling Shepard and Darius Slayton. Ross recorded three catches for 77 yards and a touchdown in the 27–21 win. He appeared in ten games in the 2021 season. He finished with 11 receptions for 224 receiving yards and one receiving touchdown.

=== Kansas City Chiefs ===
On January 9, 2023, Ross signed a reserve/future contract with the Kansas City Chiefs. On July 26, Ross informed the Chiefs he was retiring. They subsequently placed him on the reserve/retired list.

On November 27, 2023, Ross announced he was seeking a comeback and would be coming out of retirement. The Chiefs waived him the same day, and he entered free agency.

=== Philadelphia Eagles ===
On May 23, 2024, Ross signed a one-year contract with the Philadelphia Eagles. He was released on August 27. He was re-signed to the practice squad on September 24. Ross was released by the Eagles on December 3.

=== Birmingham Stallions ===
On February 4, 2026, Ross signed with the Birmingham Stallions of the United Football League (UFL). He was released by the Stallions on May 6.

== Career statistics ==
=== NFL ===
Year	Team	Games		Receiving					Rushing				
Year	Team	GP	GS	Rec	Yds	Avg	Lng	TD	Att	Yds	Avg	Lng	TD
2017	CIN	3	1	0	0	0.0	0	0	1	12	12.0	12	0
2018	CIN	13	10	21	210	10.0	39	7	4	9	2.3	7	0
2019	CIN	8	8	28	506	18.1	66	3	3	4	1.3	5	0
2020	CIN	3	1	2	17	8.5	15	0	0	0	0.0	0	0
2021	NYG	10	1	11	224	20.4	51	1	1	16	16.0	16	0
2024	PHI	1	0	1	6	6.0	6	0	0	0	0	0	0
Total		38	21	63	963	15.3	66	11	9	41	4.6	16	0

=== College ===
Legend
	Led the NCAA
**Bold**	Career high

Season	GP	Receiving			Kick returns		
Season	GP	Rec	Yards	TDs	Ret	Yards	TDs
2013	13	16	208	1	31	720	1
2014	13	17	371	4	**38**	**938**	**2**
2015	DNP – Injured						
2016	13	**81**	**1,150**	**17**	17	411	1
Career	39	109	1,701	22	86	2,069	4
