= Sidney Jones (American football) =

American football player (born 1996)

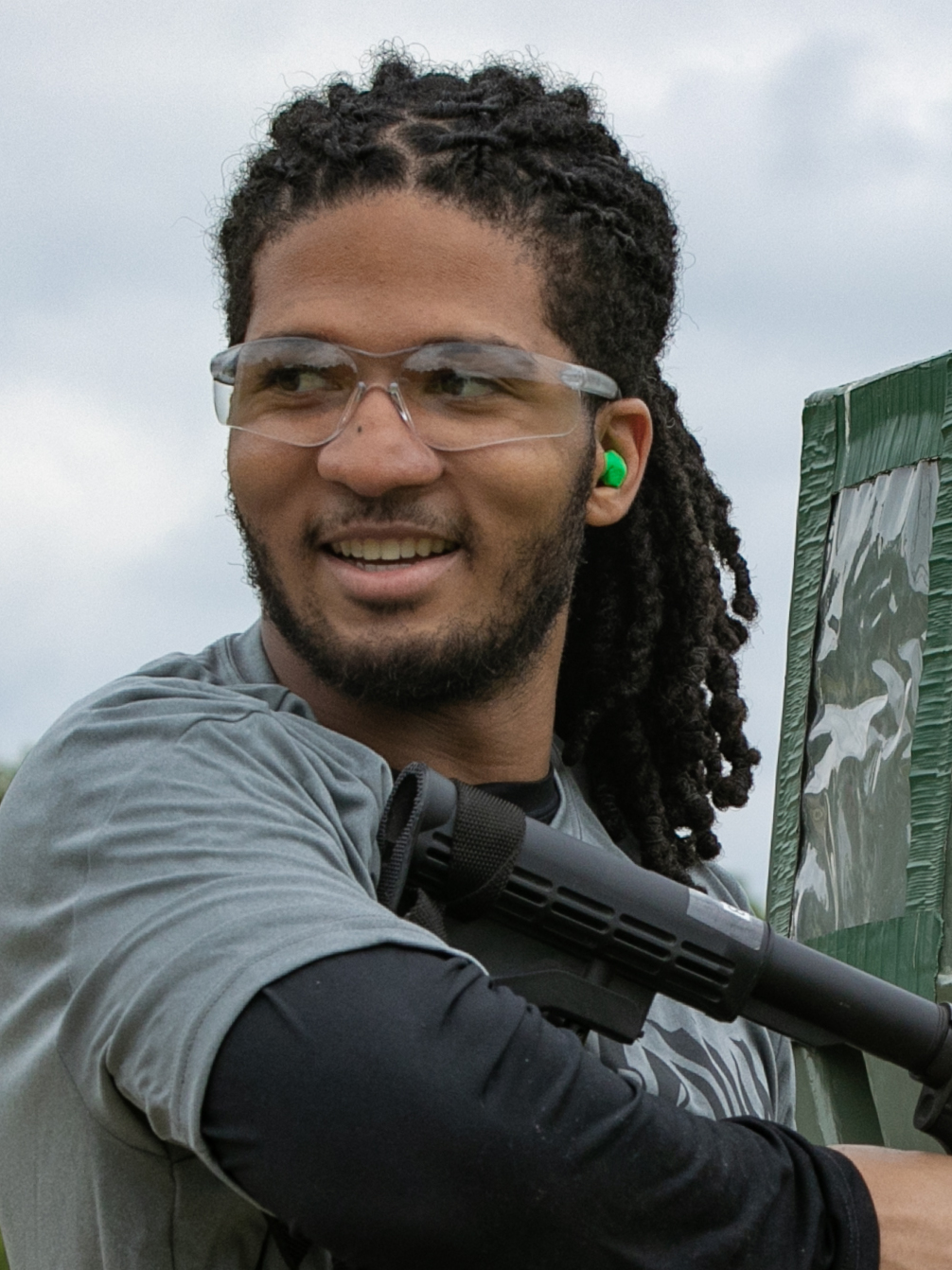
- Jones in Fort Knox, Kentucky in 2023

No. 22, 23, 31, 24
- Position: Cornerback

Personal information
- Born: May 21, 1996 (age 30); Diamond Bar, California, U.S.
- Listed height: 6 ft 0 in (1.83 m)
- Listed weight: 186 lb (84 kg)

Career information
- High school: West Covina (West Covina, California)
- College: Washington (2014–2016)
- NFL draft: 2017: 2nd round, 43rd overall pick

Career history
- Philadelphia Eagles (2017–2019); Jacksonville Jaguars (2020); Seattle Seahawks (2021–2022); Las Vegas Raiders (2022); Cincinnati Bengals (2023)

Awards and highlights
- Super Bowl champion (LII); 2× First-team All-Pac-12 (2015, 2016)

Career NFL statistics as of 2023
- Total tackles: 155
- Forced fumbles: 1
- Pass deflections: 30
- Interceptions: 4
- Stats at Pro Football Reference

Sidney Jones IV (born May 21, 1996) is an American former professional football player who was a cornerback in the National Football League (NFL). He played college football for the Washington Huskies.

== Early life ==
Jones attended West Covina High School in West Covina, California. He played wide receiver, running back, cornerback and free safety. He originally committed to the University of Utah to play college football, but later flipped his commitment to the University of Washington.

== College career ==
Jones started 12 of 13 games as a true freshman with the Huskies in 2014. He finished the year with 61 tackles, two interceptions and one sack. As a sophomore in 2015, Jones started all 13 games and was named first team All-Pac-12 after recording 45 tackles, four interceptions and a touchdown. On January 3, 2017 Jones announced his decision to forgo his senior season and enter the NFL draft.

On March 21, 2017, Jones underwent surgery to repair a torn Achilles, an injury he suffered during pro day.

=== College statistics ===
Year	Team	GP	Tackles			Interceptions						Fumbles	
Year	Team	GP	Total	Solo	Ast	PDef	Int	Yds	Avg	Lng	TDs	FF	FR
2014	Washington	13	61	48	13	7	2	22	11.0	22	0	1	1
2015	Washington	13	45	30	15	14	4	125	31.3	69	1	3	2
2016	Washington	14	39	27	12	9	3	0	0.0	0	0	2	0
Total		40	145	105	40	30	9	147	16.3	69	1	6	3
Source: GoHuskies.com

== Professional career ==
=== Pre-draft ===
Coming out of college, Jones was projected as a first-round pick by scouts and analysts. Prior to the NFL Scouting Combine, he was ranked as the fifth-best cornerback in the draft by Pro Football Focus. He attended the combine and decided to forgo performing the bench press. On March 11, 2017, Jones participated in Washington's pro day. In the final positional drill, he suffered an Achilles injury and had to be carted off the field. The injury caused his draft stock to plummet, going from a projected first-round pick to a second- or third-round pick by draft experts and analysts. After he was injured at Washington's Pro Day, he was ranked as the ninth-best cornerback option by Sports Illustrated, the 13th-best by ESPN, and the 13th-best cornerback by NFLDraftScout.com.

Pre-draft measurables
Height	Weight	Arm length	Hand span	Wingspan	40-yard dash	10-yard split	20-yard split	20-yard shuttle	Three-cone drill	Vertical jump	Broad jump	Bench press
6 ft 0 in (1.83 m)	186 lb (84 kg)	31 1/2 in (0.80 m)	9 3/8 in (0.24 m)	5 ft 11 7/8 in (1.83 m)	4.47 s	1.56 s	2.62 s	4.28 s	7.02 s	33.5 in (0.85 m)	10 ft 3 in (3.12 m)	12 reps
All values from NFL Combine/Pro Day

=== Philadelphia Eagles ===
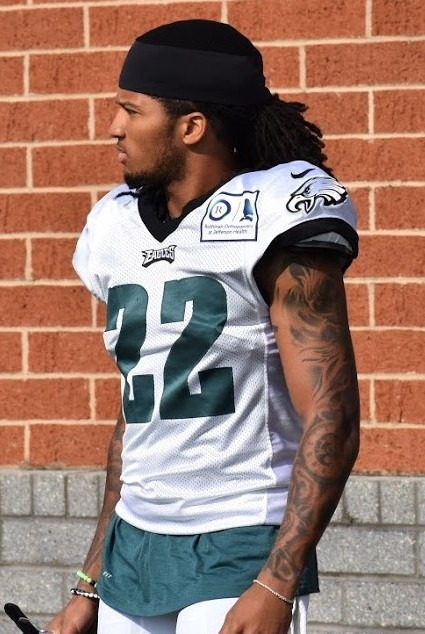
Jones with the Philadelphia Eagles in 2019

The Philadelphia Eagles selected Jones in the second round (43rd overall) of the 2017 NFL draft. He was the seventh cornerback selected in the draft. On May 11, 2017, he signed a four-year, $6.14 million contract with $3.34 million guaranteed and a signing bonus of $2.60 million. He was placed on the reserve/non-football injury list to start the season due to his Achilles injury. On December 30, 2017, Jones was activated to the 53-man roster for the regular season finale against the Dallas Cowboys. Jones was inactive for the playoffs, and the Eagles won Super Bowl LII 41–33 against the New England Patriots.

In 2018, Jones began the season as the starting nickelback for the first six games of the season. He suffered a hamstring injury in a week 6 game against the New York Giants on October 11, and missed the next three games. He returned in a week 11 game against the New Orleans Saints as the starting left cornerback, but left the game after re-aggravating his hamstring injury. He missed week 12 with the injury, and returned again the next week against the Washington Redskins as the starting left cornerback. He started the following week against the Cowboys, but left the game due to another hamstring flare up. He missed the final three regular season games and the two playoff games with his hamstring injury.

In 2019, Jones started the season splitting time at cornerback with Rasul Douglas for the first three games of the season. In week 2 against the Atlanta Falcons, Jones recorded his first career interception off Matt Ryan in the 24-20 loss. In week 4, Jones became a full-time starter alongside Douglas with Ronald Darby out with an injury, but suffered a hamstring injury early in the game. He missed the next week with the injury, but returned for a week 5 game against the Minnesota Vikings on October 13. Jones was healthy and active on the gameday roster in week 7, but did not play in the game. He was the main nickelback against the Buffalo Bills in week 8, but was a healthy inactive for week 9 with Avonte Maddox recovered from an injury. In week 17 against the Giants, Jones intercepted a pass thrown by rookie quarterback Daniel Jones late in the fourth quarter to seal a 34–17 Eagles' win.

On September 5, 2020, the Eagles waived Jones during final roster cuts after three seasons.

=== Jacksonville Jaguars ===
On September 8, 2020, the Jacksonville Jaguars signed Jones to their practice squad. He was promoted to the active roster on September 14, 2020. In Week 5 against the Houston Texans, Jones recorded his first interception as a Jaguar off a pass thrown by Deshaun Watson during the 30–14 loss. He was placed on injured reserve on December 26, 2020.

Jones signed a contract extension with the Jaguars on March 16, 2021.

=== Seattle Seahawks ===
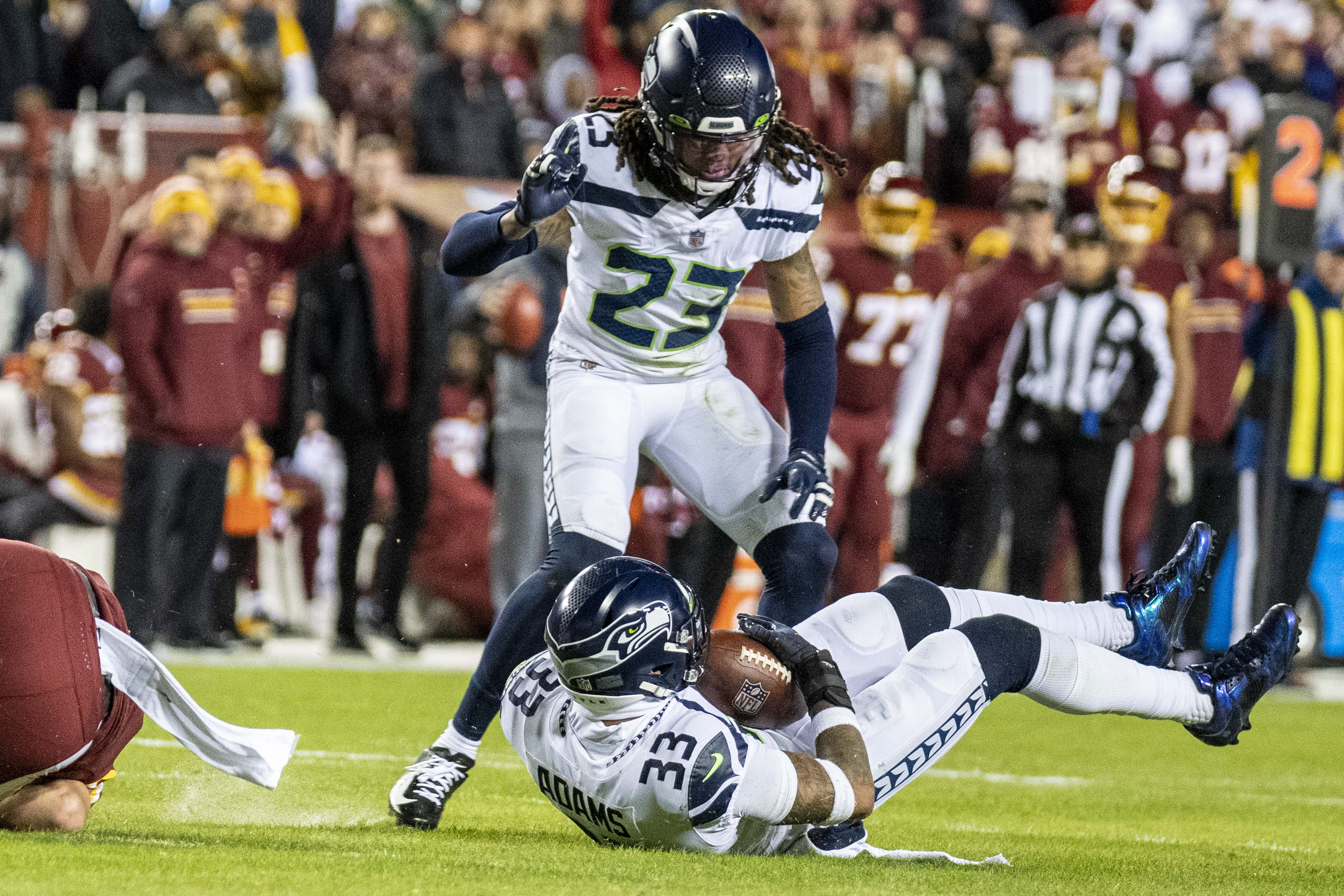
Jones (#23) playing for the Seahawks in 2021.

On August 31, 2021, Jones was traded to the Seattle Seahawks in exchange for a 2022 sixth-round pick.

On March 14, 2022, Jones re-signed with the Seahawks on a one-year contract. He was released by Seattle on November 1.

=== Las Vegas Raiders ===
On November 7, 2022, the Las Vegas Raiders signed Jones to their active roster.

=== Cincinnati Bengals ===
On March 27, 2023, Jones signed with the Cincinnati Bengals. He was released on August 29, and re-signed to the practice squad the following day. Jones' contract expired when the team's season ended January 7, 2024.
