= Azeem Victor =

American football player (born 1995)

No. 54, 95, 3
- Position: Linebacker

Personal information
- Born: September 19, 1995 (age 31); Compton, California, U.S.
- Listed height: 6 ft 3 in (1.91 m)
- Listed weight: 231 lb (105 kg)

Career information
- High school: Pomona (Pomona, California)
- College: Washington
- NFL draft: 2018: 6th round, 216th overall pick

Career history
- Oakland Raiders (2018)*; Tampa Bay Buccaneers (2018)*; Seattle Seahawks (2018)*; Orlando Apollos (2019); Calgary Stampeders (2019); TSL Alphas (2021); Houston Gamblers (2022)
- * Offseason or practice squad member only

Awards and highlights
- First-team All-Pac-12 (2016)
- Stats at Pro Football Reference

Azeem Victor (born September 19, 1995) is an American former professional football linebacker. He played college football at Washington.

== College career ==
He played college football for Washington. Victor was a first-team all-Pac-12 Conference selection in 2016 after posting 67 tackles but missed the last month with a broken tibia. Going into the 2017 season, Victor was an Associated Press preseason first-team All-American. His season ended in November after he was suspended by coach Chris Petersen for a DUI charge.

== Professional career ==
Victor was selected by the Oakland Raiders in the sixth round (216th overall) of the 2018 NFL draft. He was waived on September 1, 2018.

On September 3, 2018, Victor was signed to the practice squad of the Tampa Bay Buccaneers. He was released on September 11, 2018.

On September 26, 2018, Victor was signed to the Seattle Seahawks' practice squad. He was released on October 23, 2018.

In 2019, Victor joined the Orlando Apollos of the Alliance of American Football. He played in four games for the Apollos, recording one assisted tackle. He was waived on March 12, 2019.

Victor was suspended for the first 10 weeks of the 2019 NFL season on April 24, 2019. He was reinstated from suspension on November 12, 2019.

He played in one game for the Calgary Stampeders of the Canadian Football League in 2019, totaling one defensive tackle and one special teams tackle.

Victor signed with the Alphas of The Spring League in May 2021.

Victor was selected by the Houston Gamblers of the United States Football league (USFL) in the 29th round of the 2022 USFL draft. He played in five games for the Gamblers in 2022, recording ten solo tackles and seven assisted tackles. He was released on May 20, 2022.

== Coaching career ==
Victor signed with Athletes Untapped as a private football coach on Mar 21, 2024.
