= Bo Scarbrough =

American football player (born 1994)

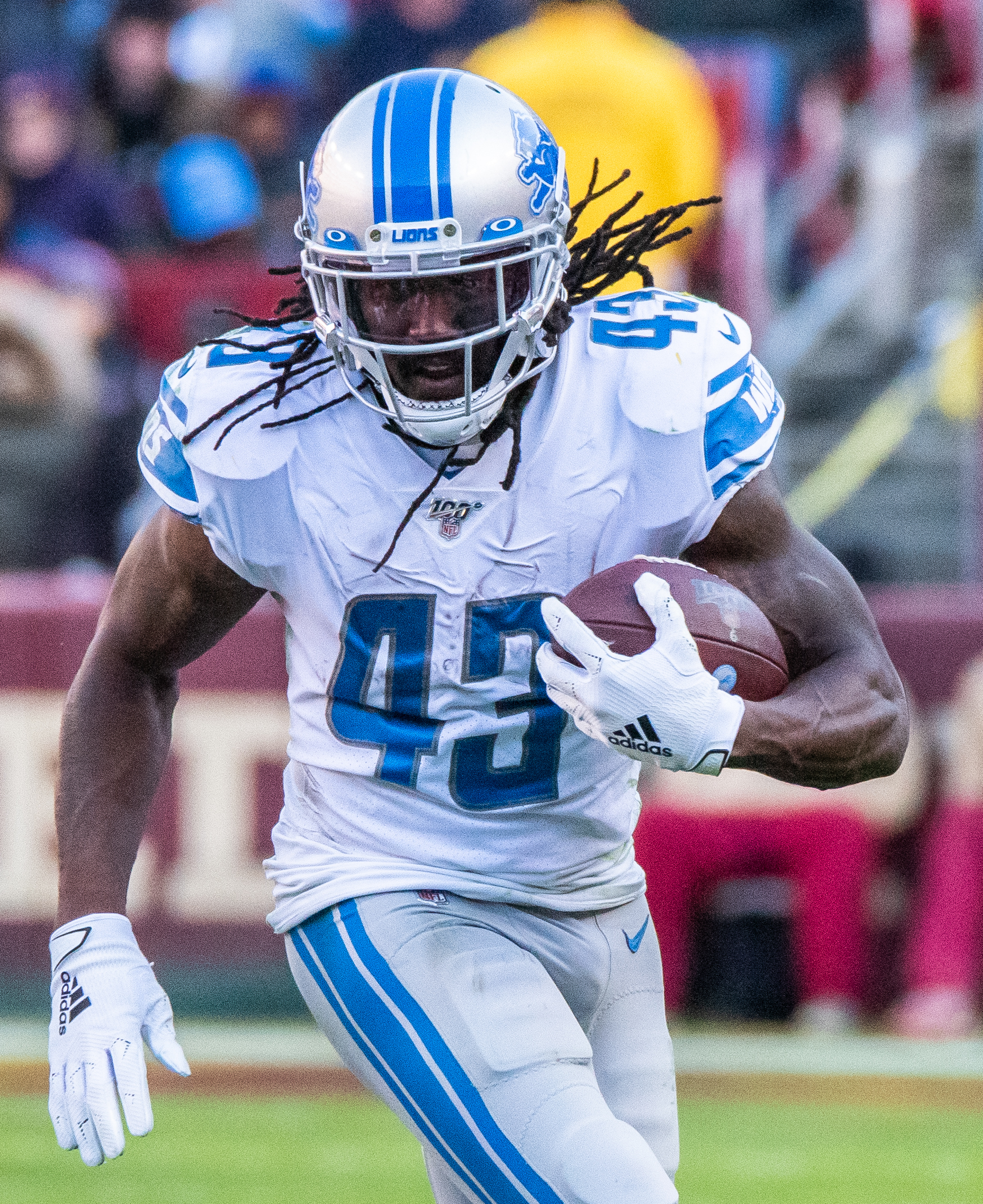
- Scarbrough with the Detroit Lions in 2019

No. 43, 40, 25
- Position: Running back

Personal information
- Born: September 29, 1994 (age 32); Eutaw, Alabama, U.S.
- Listed height: 6 ft 1 in (1.85 m)
- Listed weight: 235 lb (107 kg)

Career information
- High school: Tuscaloosa County (Northport, Alabama)
- College: Alabama (2014–2017)
- NFL draft: 2018: 7th round, 236th overall pick

Career history
- Dallas Cowboys (2018)*; Jacksonville Jaguars (2018)*; Seattle Seahawks (2018); Detroit Lions (2019–2020); Seattle Seahawks (2020); Las Vegas Raiders (2021)*; Birmingham Stallions (2022–2023)
- * Offseason or practice squad member only

Awards and highlights
- 2× USFL champion (2022, 2023); 2× CFP national champion (2015, 2017); 2016 Peach Bowl MVP

Career NFL statistics
- Rushing yards: 408
- Rushing average: 4.3
- Rushing touchdowns: 1
- Receptions: 1
- Receiving yards: 5
- Stats at Pro Football Reference

Bo Scarbrough (born September 29, 1994) is an American former professional football player who was a running back in the National Football League (NFL). He played college football for the Alabama Crimson Tide before a four year NFL career, largely for the Seattle Seahawks and Detroit Lions. Following his tenure in the NFL, Scarbrough played two seasons in the USFL with the Birmingham Stallions, winning back to back USFL Championships. He currently serves as an analyst with “The Bama Standard” podcast on “The Bama Standard Network” YouTube channel (2021–present).

== Early life ==
Scarbrough attended Northridge High School in Tuscaloosa, Alabama, where he played high school football for the Jaguars. As a freshman, he suffered a broken ankle. As a sophomore, he had 938 rushing yards and 13 touchdowns, before suffering a torn ACL near the end of the season and missing the playoffs. As a junior, he registered 792 rushing yards in six games, before suffering a high ankle sprain in the first quarter of the seventh game.

As a senior in June 2013, he announced his transfer to Tuscaloosa County High School in Northport, Alabama. Two months later in August 2013, he announced his transfer to IMG Academy in Bradenton, Florida. In ten games, he rushed for 1,468 yards and 20 touchdowns. He was rated as a consensus five-star recruit and committed to the University of Alabama to play college football.

== College career ==
As redshirt freshman in 2015, he sat out the first four contests after suffering a torn ACL in spring practice. During the season, he was one of the backups to Heisman Trophy winner Derrick Henry, Kenyan Drake, and Damien Harris, posting 18 carries for 104 yards. Against Charleston Southern, he had 10 carries for 69 yards and scored his first collegiate touchdown. He appeared in four games and had 18 carries for 104 rushing yards and one rushing touchdown.

As a sophomore, Scarbrough was part of a backfield unit that contained Harris and newcomer Josh Jacobs. He posted 125 carries for 812 yards and 11 touchdowns. In the annual rivalry game against #9 Tennessee, he had five carries for 109 rushing yards and a rushing touchdown, which was an 85-yard carry in the fourth quarter of the 49–10 victory. In the last three games (SEC Championship, CFP Semifinal, and CFP National Championship), he rushed 46 times for 364 yards (7.9-yard average) and six touchdowns. He ran for two rushing touchdowns and an Alabama bowl game record 180 yards against Washington in the 2016 Peach Bowl. He was named the game's offensive MVP. He suffered a broken right fibula in the CFP National Championship Game, leaving the game with 93 rushing yards and two touchdowns.

As a junior, he continued to share the backfield with Damien Harris and Jacobs, along with newcomer Najee Harris. He finished third on the team with 124 carries for 596 yards, tied for second with eight touchdowns, and second with 17 receptions for 109 yards. On January 10, 2018, it was announced that Scarbrough would forego his senior year at Alabama in favor of the 2018 NFL draft.

=== Statistics ===
Season	Team	GP	Rushing				Receiving			
Season	Team	GP	Att	Yds	Avg	TD	Rec	Yds	Avg	TD
2015	Alabama	4	18	104	5.8	1	0	0	0.0	0
2016	Alabama	13	125	812	6.5	11	4	22	5.5	0
2017	Alabama	14	124	596	4.8	8	17	109	6.4	0
Total		31	267	1,512	5.7	20	21	131	6.2	0

== Professional career ==
Pre-draft measurables
Height	Weight	Arm length	Hand span	40-yard dash	10-yard split	20-yard split	20-yard shuttle	Vertical jump	Broad jump	Bench press
6 ft 1 3/8 in (1.86 m)	228 lb (103 kg)	33 1/2 in (0.85 m)	10 in (0.25 m)	4.52 s	1.50 s	2.50 s	4.34 s	40.0 in (1.02 m)	10 ft 9 in (3.28 m)	14 reps
All values from NFL Combine

=== Dallas Cowboys ===
Scarbrough was selected by the Dallas Cowboys in the seventh round (236th overall) of the 2018 NFL draft. He was one of 12 Alabama players to be drafted that year.

On September 1, Scarbrough was released after the team decided to keep only two running backs. After the Green Bay Packers signed running back Darius Jackson from the Cowboys' practice squad, Scarbrough was signed on September 3 as his replacement. He was released on October 9, 2018.

=== Jacksonville Jaguars ===
On October 11, 2018, Scarbrough was signed to the Jacksonville Jaguars practice squad.

=== Seattle Seahawks (first stint) ===
On December 18, 2018, Scarbrough was signed by the Seattle Seahawks off the Jaguars practice squad. He was declared inactive for the last two games. He was waived on August 31, 2019.

=== Detroit Lions ===
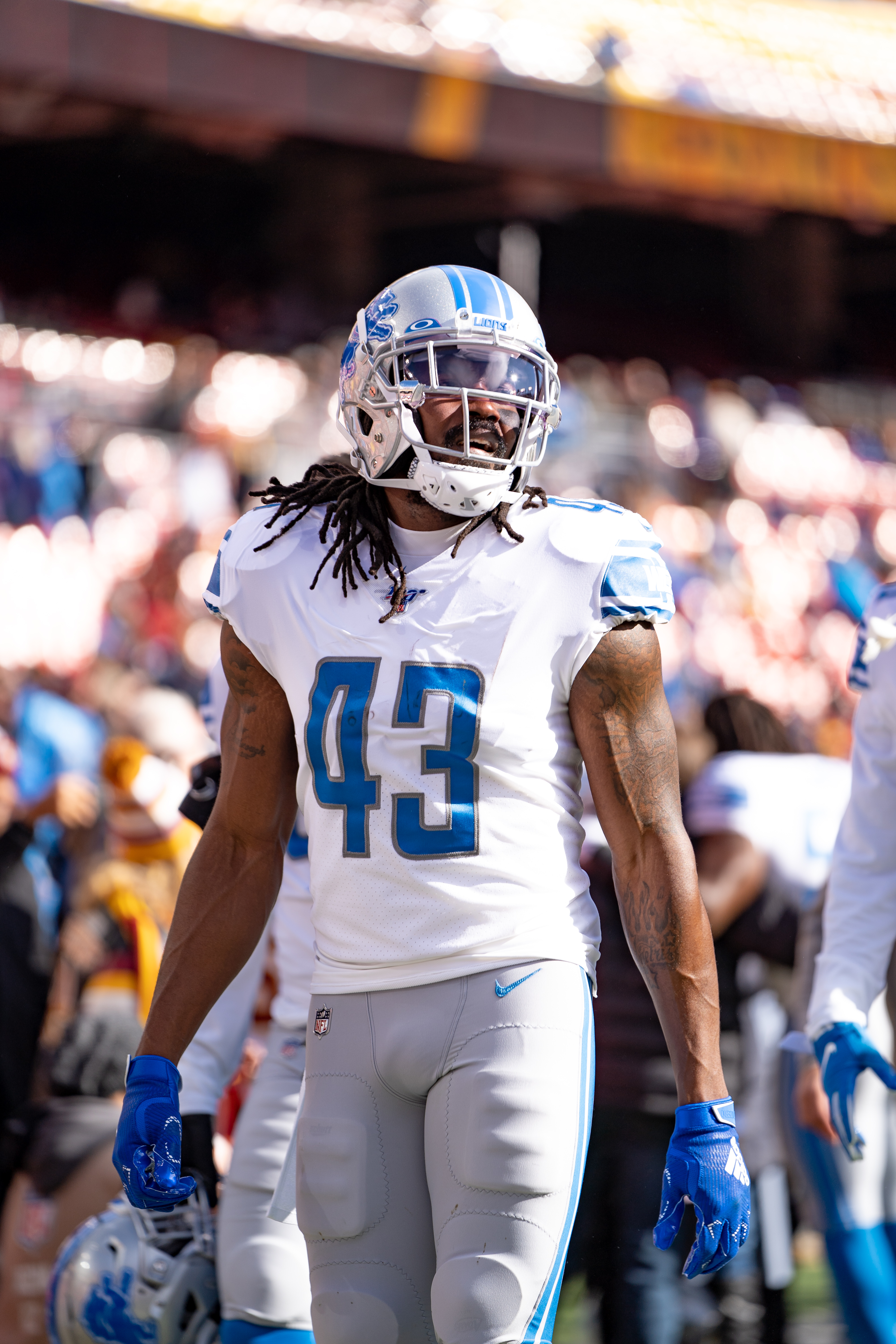
Scarbrough in a game against the Washington Redskins

On November 6, 2019, Scarbrough was signed to the Detroit Lions practice squad. On November 16, 2019, he was promoted to the active roster, to provide depth while running back Kerryon Johnson was out with a torn meniscus. Scarbrough was named the starter over J. D. McKissic, for the Week 11 game against his former team, the Dallas Cowboys. He rushed 14 times for 55 yards (3.93-yard avg.) and a touchdown in the 35–27 loss. In the following week's game against the Washington Redskins, he rushed 18 times for 98 yards (5.44-yard avg.) in the 19–16 loss. In the Week 13 contest against the Chicago Bears, he had 21 carries for 83 yards (3.95-yard avg.) in the 20–24 loss. He was declared inactive with a rib injury in Week 15. He appeared in six games and started five, while recording 377 rushing yards (4.24-yard avg.) and one rushing touchdown.

In 2020, he faced a difficult challenge to make the team, after running backs D'Andre Swift and Jason Huntley were selected by the Lions in the second and fifth rounds of the 2020 NFL draft. On September 6, 2020, Scarbrough was placed on injured reserve with an undisclosed injury, which cleared a roster spot to sign running back Adrian Peterson. He was activated on October 24 and was declared inactive for the game against the Atlanta Falcons. He was waived on October 31.

=== Seattle Seahawks (second stint) ===
On November 11, 2020, Scarbrough was signed to the Seahawks' practice squad. He was elevated to the active roster on November 19 for the team's week 11 game against the Arizona Cardinals, to provide depth with running backs Chris Carson and Travis Homer injured. He had 6 carries for 36 yards (5.17-yard avg.), but also suffered a torn hamstring in the fourth quarter, before being reverted to the practice squad after the contest. He was placed on the practice squad/injured list on November 23. His practice squad contract with the team expired after the season on January 18, 2021.

=== Las Vegas Raiders ===
On August 6, 2021, Scarbrough signed with the Las Vegas Raiders. He was waived on August 16, 2021.

=== Birmingham Stallions ===
On May 9, 2022, Scarbrough signed with the Birmingham Stallions of the United States Football League, at the midway point of the season. He took over the starting running back position and shared carries with C. J. Marable, while helping the Stallions win the first USFL Championship over the Philadelphia Stars, 33–30. In the final, he had 13 carries for 135 yards (10.4-yard avg.), including a 70-yard run and a 36-yard touchdown. He appeared in six games with five starts, making 84 carries for 352 yards and one touchdown.

On April 20, 2023, he was placed on the injured reserve list after the season opener. He re-signed with the Stallions on September 14, 2023. On January 15, 2024, he was selected by the Stallions in the seventh round of the Super Draft portion during the 2024 UFL dispersal draft. He announced his retirement on March 8, 2024, partway through Stallions training camp; the UFL afforded him a full press conference to announce the retirement. He was placed on the team's retired list on March 10.
