= Chris Petersen =

American football player and coach (born 1964)

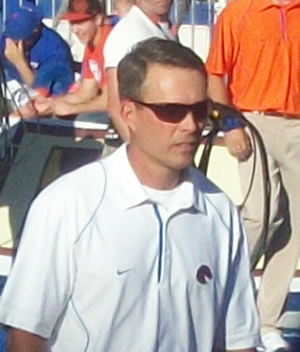
- Petersen in 2010

Biographical details
- Born: October 13, 1964 (age 62); Yuba City, California, U.S.
- Education: University of California, Davis (BS, 1988; M.Ed.); Sacramento City College (AA)

Playing career
- 1983–1984: Sacramento City
- 1985–1986: UC Davis
- Position: Quarterback

Coaching career (HC unless noted)
- 1987–1988: UC Davis (freshman)
- 1989–1991: UC Davis (WR)
- 1992: Pittsburgh (QB)
- 1993–1994: Portland State (QB)
- 1995–2000: Oregon (WR)
- 2001–2005: Boise State (OC)
- 2006–2013: Boise State
- 2014–2019: Washington

Head coaching record
- Overall: 147–38
- Bowls: 7–6
- Tournaments: 0–1 (CFP)

Accomplishments and honors

Championships
- 2 Pac-12 (2016, 2018); 1 Mountain West (2012); 4 WAC (2006, 2008–2010); 3 Pac-12 North Division (2016–2018)

Awards
- Bobby Dodd Coach of the Year (2010); 2× Paul "Bear" Bryant Award (2006, 2009); 2× WAC Coach of the Year (2008, 2009)
- College Football Hall of Fame; Inducted in 2026 (profile)

Christopher Scott Petersen (born October 13, 1964) is an American former college football coach. He was the head coach for eight seasons at Boise State University; Petersen guided the Broncos to two BCS bowl wins in the 2007 and 2010 Fiesta Bowls. He is the first two-time winner of the Paul "Bear" Bryant Award, which he won in 2006 and 2009. Petersen also won the Bobby Dodd Coach of the Year Award in 2010. At the University of Washington, Petersen led the Huskies to the College Football Playoff in 2016, but fell to Alabama in the Peach Bowl. Petersen announced his resignation on December 2, 2019, effective after the team's bowl game.

== Early life ==
Born and raised in Yuba City, California, Petersen played safety and quarterback for the Honkers at Yuba City High School under the guidance of coach George Calkins. After graduation in 1983, he played quarterback for the Sacramento City College Panthers for two seasons, then transferred to non-scholarship UC Davis, then in Division II. He earned a bachelor's degree in psychology in 1988 and a master's degree in education from UC Davis.

== Coaching career ==
=== Early coaching career ===
Petersen began his coaching career in 1987 as the head freshman coach at UC Davis under Hall of Fame coach Jim Sochor. In 1989, he became the receivers coach for the varsity, departing in 1992 to become the quarterbacks coach at Pittsburgh. While at Pittsburgh, he coached QB Alex Van Pelt to a season where he threw for over 3,100 yards with twenty touchdowns.

He moved back west in 1993 to coach the quarterbacks at Portland State under Tim Walsh; the Vikings advanced to the Division II playoffs in both 1993 and 1994. Petersen moved over to Oregon in 1995 as the receivers coach, and spent six years as an assistant for the Ducks under head coach Mike Bellotti. In 1996, WR Cristin McLeMore topped 1,000 yards receiving. In 1997, WR Pat Johnson topped 1,000 yards. In 1998, WRs Damon Griffin and Tony Hartley both topped 1,000 yards on the year.

In January 2001, Petersen was hired as the offensive coordinator at Boise State by newly promoted head coach Dan Hawkins. The offense peaked in 2003, scoring a school-best 602 points en route to a 13–1 season: QB Ryan Dinwiddie threw for 4,356 yards and 31 TD, RB David Mikell ran for 1,142 yards and 13 TD, and WR Tim Gilligan had 1,192 yards and 6 TD.

=== Boise State ===
Hawkins left Boise State for Colorado after the 2005 season, and Petersen was promoted to head coach on December 16. Sophomore tailback Ian Johnson said about the transition, "We trusted him and knew he was going to take care of us. We knew he was a great person. He was going to recruit people just like himself. We waited for him to get everybody here and he got in the perfect people." Petersen had served as offensive coordinator at Boise State for five seasons and was twice nominated for the Broyles Award, given to the nation's best assistant coach.

==== 2007 Fiesta Bowl ====
In his first year as head coach, Petersen led the Broncos to an undefeated regular season in 2006 and the program's first ever BCS bowl game berth. He became the fourth rookie head coach to lead a team to a BCS bowl game; Boise State was the only undefeated team in Division I FBS for the 2006 season.

The Broncos defeated Big 12 champion Oklahoma in the Fiesta Bowl as only the second BCS non-AQ conference school to play in a BCS bowl, after Utah in 2004. Petersen drew particular attention for his bold play calling after the Broncos, who were leading most of the game, trailed the Sooners by a touchdown late in the contest. A 50-yard hook-and-lateral play on 4th-and-18 described as "stunning" tied the game with seven seconds left. An option pass (off a direct snap to a wide receiver) on 4th-and-2 on Boise State's possession in overtime pulled the Broncos within one point after Oklahoma scored on their possession. Petersen then decided to forgo an extra point kick and go for the victory with a two-point conversion attempt, calling a successful "Statue of Liberty" misdirection play for a 43–42 win. Petersen stated, "We were trying to get to it earlier, to tell you the truth. We needed a play like that to get it over with."

==== Improved contracts ====
After the undefeated season of 2006, the Idaho State Board of Education approved a new contract for Petersen on February 22, 2007, paying him $4.25 million for five years, or $850,000 per year. His salary was paid mostly by revenue from the Football Coaches Club, the Bronco Athletic Association booster club, and media and public appearances; state-appropriated funds covered $150,000 per year.

After leading Boise State to another undefeated regular season in 2009, Petersen was rewarded with a new five-year contract extension on January 1, 2010. The state board of education approved the new contract on April 22, which paid $8 million over five years, or $1.6 million per year. The contract also included automatic one-year extensions to the contract each time Petersen won at least eight regular season games.

Petersen's last contract in Boise was agreed to on January 3, 2012. The five-year, $18 million deal called for a base salary of $2 million for the 2012 season, with $200,000 raises in each subsequent season. It also included retention bonuses of $100,000 after two years and $200,000 in each of the final three years of the deal.

=== Washington ===
On December 6, 2013, Petersen agreed to a five-year, $18 million contract to become the new head coach at Washington. He replaced Steve Sarkisian, who announced that he was leaving Washington to take the same position at USC three days after the 2013 Apple Cup.

In Petersen's first season in 2014, Washington went 8–6 and lost in the Cactus Bowl to Oklahoma State. During the season, Petersen became the quickest active FBS coach to reach 100 wins, achieving the mark in just 117 games as a head coach.

In 2015, a young Huskies team finished 7–6, including an upset at USC against Sarkisian. Washington defeated Southern Miss in the Heart of Dallas Bowl. Petersen signed a two-year contract extension near the end of the 2015 season.

The 2016 Huskies had one of the best seasons in Washington history, winning the Pac-12 championship and earning a berth to the program's first-ever College Football Playoff. In the Pac-12 Championship, No. 4 Washington defeated No. 9 Colorado 41–10 at Levi's Stadium. On December 31, 2016, Alabama beat Washington 24–7 in the Peach Bowl, ending the Huskies' season. After the season, Petersen's contract was extended through 2023 with an average salary of $4.875 million per year. This new contract made Petersen the highest paid coach in the Pac-12 at the time.

Washington posted back-to-back 10-win seasons for the first time since 1990–91 after going 10–3 in 2017. The Huskies played in a New Year's Six bowl, losing to Penn State in the Fiesta Bowl.

Petersen led the Huskies to another Pac-12 title in 2018. UW defeated Utah 10–3 in the title game to clinch a berth in the Rose Bowl against Ohio State, which they would lose 28–23. During the season, Washington beat No. 7 Washington State in the Apple Cup, marking the Huskies' sixth straight rivalry win over the Cougars, fifth under Petersen.

After losing numerous key starters to the NFL Draft, the 2019 Huskies regressed from previous seasons, finishing the regular season 7–5. The Huskies did win their seventh straight Apple Cup in 2019, beating Washington State, 31–13. On December 2, Petersen announced he would step down as Washington's head coach at the end of the season and assume a leadership advisory role with the athletics program. In Petersen's final game as coach, Washington beat his former team, Boise State, in the Las Vegas Bowl, 38–7.

== Personal life ==
Petersen and his wife, Barbara, have two sons, Jack and Sam. His father, Ron Petersen, is a Seattle native who grew up watching University of Washington football games on television as a boy.

== Honors ==
- Paul "Bear" Bryant Award in 2006 and 2009
- Western Athletic Conference Coach of the Year in 2008
- Bobby Dodd Coach of the Year Award in 2010
- College Football Hall of Fame inductee in 2026. @RossDellenger (January 14, 2026). "NEWS: Here is the 2026 College Football Hall of Fame Class, including notable coaches Gary Patterson and Chris Petersen, as well as players DT Aaron Donald, RB Mark Ingram, WR Marvin Harrison, LB James Laurinaitis and DT Ndamukong Suh" (Tweet) – via X (formerly Twitter).

== Head coaching record ==
Year	Team	Overall	Conference	Standing	Bowl/playoffs	Coaches^{#}	AP^{°}
Boise State Broncos (Western Athletic Conference) (2006–2010)
2006	Boise State	13–0	8–0	1st	W Fiesta^{†}	6	5
2007	Boise State	10–3	7–1	2nd	L Hawaii		
2008	Boise State	12–1	8–0	1st	L Poinsettia	13	11
2009	Boise State	14–0	8–0	1st	W Fiesta^{†}	4	4
2010	Boise State	12–1	7–1	T–1st	W Maaco	7	9
Boise State Broncos (Mountain West Conference) (2011–2013)
2011	Boise State	12–1	6–1	2nd	W Maaco	6	8
2012	Boise State	11–2	7–1	T–1st	W Maaco	14	18
2013	Boise State	8–4	6–2	2nd (Mountain)	Hawaii*		
Boise State:		92–12	57–6	* Petersen resigned before bowl game			
Washington Huskies (Pac-12 Conference) (2014–2019)
2014	Washington	8–6	4–5	3rd (North)	L Cactus		
2015	Washington	7–6	4–5	4th (North)	W Heart of Dallas		
2016	Washington	12–2	8–1	1st (North)	L Peach^{†}	4	4
2017	Washington	10–3	7–2	T–1st (North)	L Fiesta^{†}	15	16
2018	Washington	10–4	7–2	T–1st (North)	L Rose^{†}	13	13
2019	Washington	8–5	4–5	T–2nd (North)	W Las Vegas		
Washington:		55–26	34–20				
Total:		147–38					
National championship Conference title Conference division title or championship game berth
^{†}Indicates BCS or CFP / New Years' Six bowl.; ^{#}Rankings from final Coaches Poll.; ^{°}Rankings from final AP Poll.
