= Darrell Daniels =

American football player (born 1994)

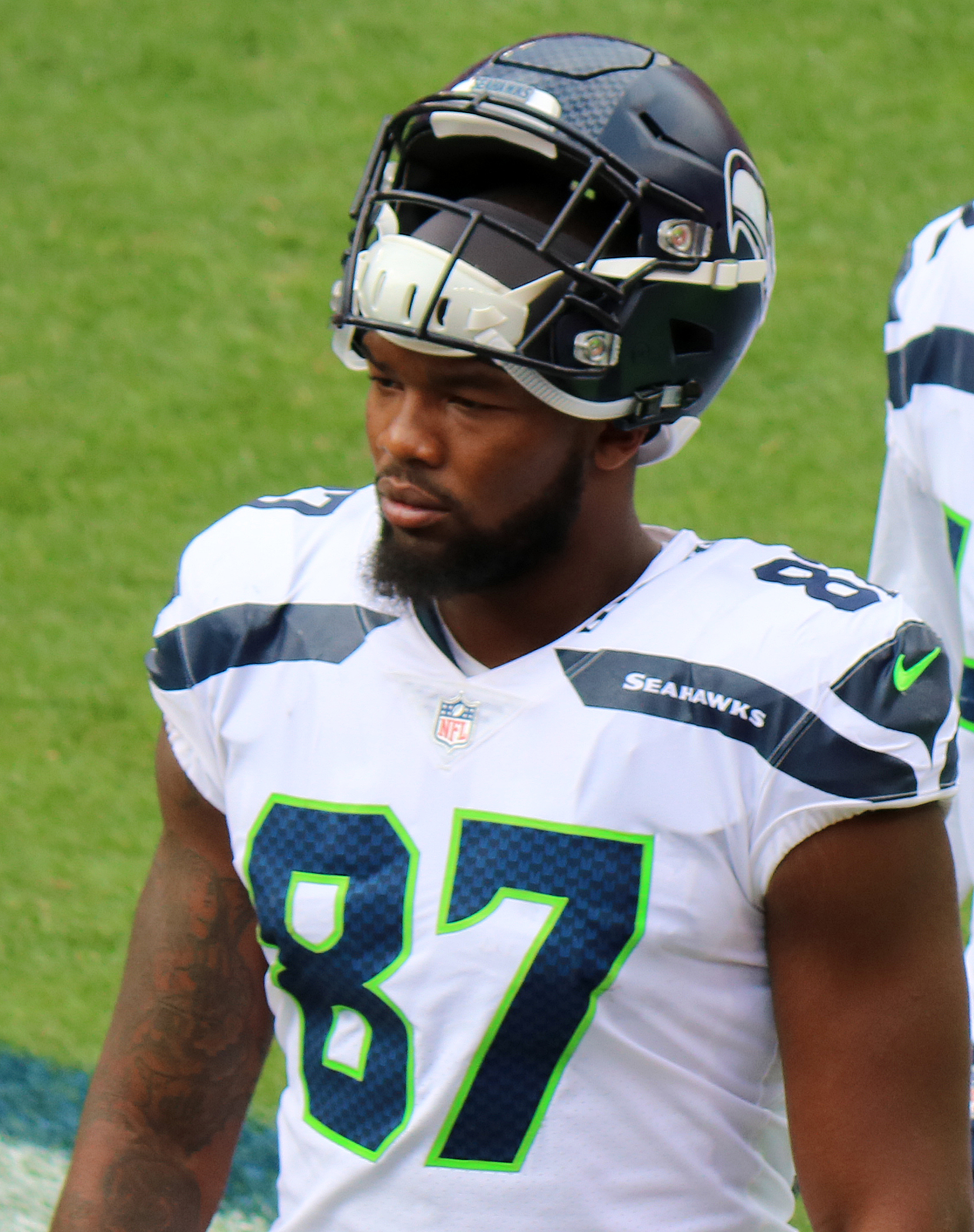
- Daniels with the Seattle Seahawks in 2018

No. 47, 87, 81, 86
- Position: Tight end

Personal information
- Born: November 22, 1994 (age 31); Pittsburg, California, U.S.
- Listed height: 6 ft 3 in (1.91 m)
- Listed weight: 256 lb (116 kg)

Career information
- High school: Freedom (Oakley, California)
- College: Washington
- NFL draft: 2017: undrafted

Career history
- Indianapolis Colts (2017); Seattle Seahawks (2018); Arizona Cardinals (2018–2021); Houston Texans (2022)*; Indianapolis Colts (2022)*; San Antonio Brahmas (2023)*; Detroit Lions (2023)
- * Offseason or practice squad member only

Career NFL statistics
- Receptions: 13
- Receiving yards: 122
- Receiving touchdowns: 1
- Stats at Pro Football Reference

Darrell Daniels (born November 22, 1994) is an American former professional football player who was a tight end in the National Football League (NFL). He played college football for the Washington Huskies and signed with the Indianapolis Colts as an undrafted free agent in 2017.

== Early life ==
Daniels played high school football at Freedom High School in Oakley, California. He played wide receiver and linebacker his junior year in 2011 and was named the Bay Valley Athletic League (BVAL) MVP. He caught 30 passes for 426 yards and 7 touchdowns in 2011. Daniels recorded 54 receptions, 947 receiving yards, 20 receiving touchdowns, 40 rushing attempts, and 332 rushing yards his senior season in 2012. He also recorded 38 tackles and 2 interceptions as a defensive back in 2012. He earned CalHiSports.com Third-team All-State, MaxPreps Second-team Division I All-State and BVAL Co-MVP honors in 2012. Daniels played in the 2013 Semper Fidelis All-American Bowl.

== College career ==
Daniels played for the Washington Huskies from 2013 to 2016. He played in 11 games in 2013, recording 2 solo tackles and 1 tackle assist. He converted from wide receiver to tight end midway through the year. Daniels played in 11 games, starting 4, in 2014, catching 11 passes for 171 yards and 1 touchdown. He also totaled four solo tackles. He played in 13 games, starting 8, in 2015, catching 19 passes for 250 yards and 1 touchdown. Daniels also recorded four solo tackles and two tackle assists. He played in 14 games, starting 6, in 2016, catching 17 passes for 307 yards and 4 touchdowns. He earned Honorable Mention All-Pac-12 honors in 2016. He played in 49 games, starting 18, during his college career, catching 47 passes for 728 yards and 5 touchdowns. Daniels also recorded 10 solo tackles and 3 tackle assists.

== Professional career ==
Daniels was rated the 25th best tight end in the 2017 NFL draft by NFLDraftScout.com. Lance Zierlein of NFL.com predicted that he would be drafted in the seventh round or be a priority free agent, stating that "Daniels' combination of athletic ability and physical traits figures to land him as a third-day draft pick, but he will have to learn to run routes more effectively as a matchup tight end in the NFL or he will find himself stuck on the practice squad for a couple of seasons."

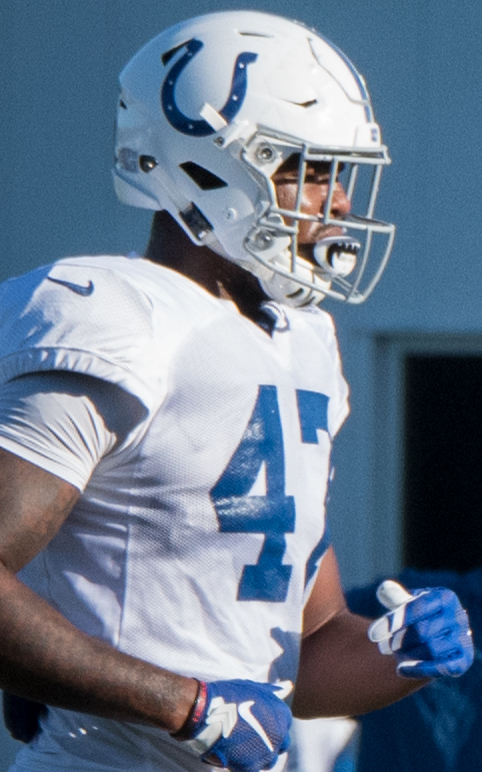
Daniels with the Colts in 2017

Pre-draft measurables
Height	Weight	Arm length	Hand span	40-yard dash	10-yard split	20-yard split	20-yard shuttle	Three-cone drill	Vertical jump	Broad jump	Bench press
6 ft 3 1/8 in (1.91 m)	247 lb (112 kg)	34 1/2 in (0.88 m)	10 1/4 in (0.26 m)	4.55 s	1.58 s	2.63 s	4.47 s	7.09 s	32 in (0.81 m)	9 ft 7 in (2.92 m)	17 reps
All values from NFL Combine

=== Indianapolis Colts ===
Daniels signed with the Indianapolis Colts as an undrafted free agent on May 4, 2017. During the Week 3 31–28 victory against the Cleveland Browns, he recorded his first career NFL reception, which was a six-yarder.

=== Seattle Seahawks ===
On September 1, 2018, Daniels was traded to the Seattle Seahawks for wide receiver Marcus Johnson. He was waived by the Seahawks on September 25, 2018, and was re-signed to the practice squad. He was promoted to the active roster on October 3, 2018, following an injury to Will Dissly. He was waived on November 24, 2018.

=== Arizona Cardinals ===
On November 26, 2018, Daniels was claimed off waivers by the Arizona Cardinals.

On August 31, 2019, Daniels was waived by the Cardinals and was signed to the practice squad the next day. He was promoted to the active roster on September 7, 2019, only to be waived two days later and re-signed back to the practice squad. He was promoted back to the active roster on September 21, 2019. He was waived again on September 28, 2019, and re-signed to the practice squad. He was promoted again on October 5. In Week 14 against the Pittsburgh Steelers, Daniels forced a fumble on punter Jordan Berry during a fake punt attempt which was recovered by teammate Dennis Gardeck in the 23–17 loss. He was placed on injured reserve on December 28, 2019.

In Week 9 of the 2020 season against the Miami Dolphins, Daniels recorded 1 catch for a 21 yard touchdown during the 34–31 loss. This was Daniels' first career touchdown in the NFL. He was placed on injured reserve on November 28, 2020. He was activated on December 19, 2020.

On March 25, 2021, Daniel re-signed with the Cardinals to a one-year contract.

=== Houston Texans ===
On May 23, 2022, Daniels signed with the Houston Texans. He was released on June 11.

=== Indianapolis Colts (second stint) ===
On November 9, 2022, Daniels signed with the practice squad of the Indianapolis Colts. He was released on November 15.

=== Detroit Lions ===
On August 2, 2023, Daniels signed with the Detroit Lions. He was released on August 29, 2023, and re-signed to the practice squad. He was promoted to the active roster on September 28. He was waived on October 21.
