= Jake Eldrenkamp =

American football player (born 1994)

No. 60
- Position: Guard

Personal information
- Born: March 4, 1994 (age 32); Medina, Washington, U.S.
- Listed height: 6 ft 5 in (1.96 m)
- Listed weight: 300 lb (136 kg)

Career information
- High school: Bellevue (Bellevue, Washington)
- College: Washington
- NFL draft: 2017: undrafted

Career history
- Los Angeles Rams (2017–2018)*; Cleveland Browns (2018)*; New England Patriots (2019)*; Indianapolis Colts (2019–2020); New England Patriots (2021)*; Houston Texans (2021)
- * Offseason or practice squad member only

Awards and highlights
- First-team All-Pac-12 (2016)

Career NFL statistics
- Games played: 2
- Stats at Pro Football Reference

Jake Eldrenkamp (born March 4, 1994) is an American former professional football player who was a guard in the National Football League (NFL). He was signed by the Los Angeles Rams as an undrafted free agent in 2017 following his college football career with the Washington Huskies.

== College career ==
Eldrenkamp spent four seasons at the University of Washington. As a senior, he garnered First-team All-Pac-12 honors and was named the Pac-12 Football Scholar Athlete of the Year.

== Professional career ==
=== Los Angeles Rams ===
Eldrenkamp signed with the Los Angeles Rams as an undrafted free agent following the 2017 NFL draft on April 29, 2017. He was waived during final roster cuts on September 2, and was re-signed to the team's practice squad the next day. Eldrenkamp was released on September 12, and was subsequently re-signed to the practice squad on November 15.

Eldrenkamp signed a reserve/futures contract with the Rams on January 8, 2018. He was waived at the end of training camp on August 31.

=== Cleveland Browns ===
Eldrenkamp signed to the Cleveland Browns' practice squad on October 16, 2018. He was released on November 7, and re-signed to the practice squad on November 30.

=== New England Patriots ===
Eldrenkamp signed a reserve/futures contract with the New England Patriots on February 5, 2019, but was waived before the start of training camp on May 20.

=== Indianapolis Colts ===
Eldrenkamp was claimed off waivers by the Indianapolis Colts on May 21, 2019. He was waived during final roster cuts on August 31, and was re-signed to the team's practice squad the next day. Eldrenkamp was promoted to the active roster on December 14.

Eldrenkamp was waived again during final roster cuts on September 5, 2020, and re-signed to the team's practice squad the next day. He was elevated to the active roster on October 10, October 17, and December 26 for the team's Weeks 5, 6, and 16 games against the Cleveland Browns, Cincinnati Bengals, and Pittsburgh Steelers, and reverted to the practice squad after each game.

On January 10, 2021, Eldrenkamp signed a reserve/futures contract with the Colts. On August 31, Eldrenkamp was waived by the Colts.

=== New England Patriots (second stint) ===
On September 22, 2021, the New England Patriots signed Eldrenkamp to their practice squad, but released him three days later.

=== Houston Texans ===
On October 5, 2021, Eldrenkamp was signed to the Houston Texans' practice squad. He signed a reserve/future contract with the Texans on January 11, 2022. The Texans waived Eldrenkamp on March 22.
