= 2016 Colorado Buffaloes football team =

American college football season

2016 Colorado Buffaloes football

Pac-12 South Division champion

Pac-12 Championship Game, L 10–41 vs. Washington

Alamo Bowl, L 8–38 vs. Oklahoma State
- Conference: Pac-12 Conference
- South Division

Ranking
- Coaches: No. 15
- AP: No. 17
- Record: 10–4 (8–1 Pac-12)
- Head coach: Mike MacIntyre (4th season)
- Co-offensive coordinators: Brian Lindgren (4th season); Darrin Chiaverini (1st season)
- Offensive scheme: Spread
- Defensive coordinator: Jim Leavitt (2nd season)
- Base defense: 4–3
- Home stadium: Folsom Field

Uniform
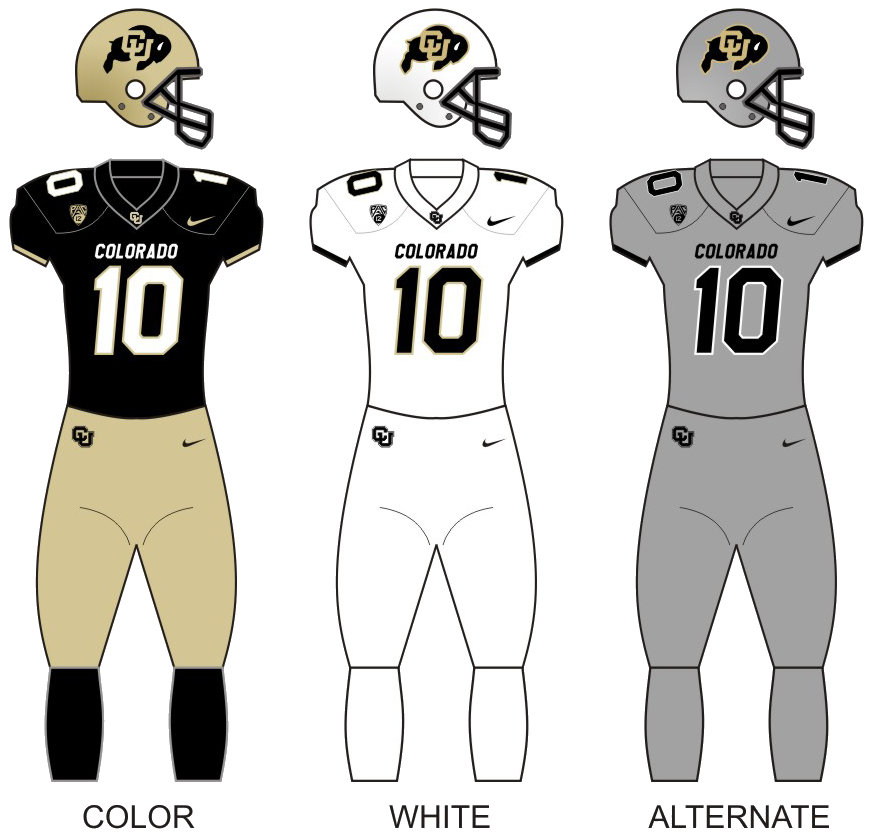

2016 Pac-12 Conference football standings
	Conf.			Overall
Team	W		L	W		L
North Division
No. 4 Washington xy$^	8	–	1	12	–	2
Washington State	7	–	2	8	–	5
No. 12 Stanford	6	–	3	10	–	3
California	3	–	6	5	–	7
Oregon State	3	–	6	4	–	8
Oregon	2	–	7	4	–	8
South Division
No. 17 Colorado xy	8	–	1	10	–	4
No. 3 USC	7	–	2	10	–	3
No. 23 Utah	5	–	4	9	–	4
Arizona State	2	–	7	5	–	7
UCLA	2	–	7	4	–	8
Arizona	1	–	8	3	–	9
Championship: Washington 41, Colorado 10
^ – College Football Playoff participant; $ – Conference champion; x – Division champion/co-champions; y – Championship game participant; Rankings from AP Poll

The 2016 Colorado Buffaloes football team represented the University of Colorado Boulder during the 2016 NCAA Division I FBS football season. Led by fourth-year head coach Mike MacIntyre, they played their home games on-campus at Folsom Field in Boulder and were members of the South Division of the Pac-12 Conference. They finished the season 10–4, 8–1 in Pac-12 play to win their first Pac-12 South Division Title. They represented the South Division in the 2016 Pac-12 Football Championship Game where they lost to Washington. They were invited to the Alamo Bowl where they lost to Oklahoma State. It was their first winning season since 2005. This would be the last bowl game for the Buffaoes in a full season until 2024.

== Personnel ==
2016 Colorado Buffaloes football team roster
Players
Coaches
Offense

Pos.	#	Name	Class
TB	19	Michael Adkins	Jr
WR	16	Jaleel Awini	Sr
WR	84	David Bagby	Sr
OL	69	Mo Bandi	Fr
TB	35	Beau Bisharat	Fr
TE	99	Brian Boatman	Sr
WR	4	Bryce Bobo	Jr
TE	43	Chris Bounds	Fr
G	70	Shane Callahan	Sr
WR	87	Xavier Cochrane	So
TE	80	Derek Coleman	Fr
WR	89	Kevin Dement	So
OL	62	Justin Eggers	Fr
WR	17	Kabian Ento	Jr
TB	21	Kyle Evans	So
WR	1	Shay Fields	Jr
TE	5	George Frazier (C)	Jr
WR	88	Danny Galloway	Jr
QB	7	Jordan Gehrke	Sr
TB	10	Dino Gordan	Fr
WR	83	Sean Grundman	Jr
TB	45	Tanner Grzesiek	Jr
OT	64	Aaron Haigler	Fr
WR	27	Joseph Hall	Jr
TE	38	Chris Hill	Sr
G	79	Jonathan Huckins	Jr
WR	6	Johnny Huntley	Fr
OT	76	Jeromy Irwin (C)	Jr
TE	81	Sean Irwin	Sr
WR	85	Justin Jan	Fr
WR	8	Anthony Julmisse	Fr
G	75	Josh Kaiser	So
TE	86	Dylan Kenney	So
C	74	Alex Kelley	Sr
G	68	Gerrad Kough	Jr
OT	71	Sam Kronshage	Jr
TB	29	Donovan Lee	Jr
TB	23	Phillip Lindsay (C)	Jr
OT	78	John Lisella	So
QB	13	Sefo Liufau (C)	Sr
G	56	Tim Lynott	Fr
OL		Chance Lytle	Fr
WR	14	Jay MacIntyre	So
QB	17	Casey Marksberry	Fr
QB	16	Tyler McGarry	Fr
OT	60	Dillion Middlemiss	Fr
OT	73	Isaac Miller	Fr
QB	12	Steven Montez	Fr
QB	15	Sam Noyer	Fr
WR	82	Robert Orban	Jr
QB	9	T.J. Patterson	Jr
OL	65	Colby Pursell	Fr
WR	3	Derrion Rakestraw	Fr
WR	2	Devin Ross	Jr
OL	61	Kolten Smith	Fr
G	66	Colin Sutton	Jr
TB	48	Joey Tuggle	Jr
OL	77	Hunter Vaughn	Fr
WR	18	Lee Walker	So
C	53	Sully Wiefels	Sr
WR	9	Juwann Winfree	Jr

Defense

Pos.	#	Name	Class
CB	4	Chidobe Awuzie	Sr
S	40	Cameron Beemster	Jr
OLB	57	Sam Bennion	Fr
CB	41	Andrew Bergner	Jr
DB	2	Ronnie Blackmon	Fr
DE	92	Jordan Carrell	Sr
DE	59	Timothy Coleman	Jr
CB	37	Lucas Cooper	Fr
OLB	42	N.J. Falo	So
S	7	Nick Fisher	So
NT	56	Jase Franke	So
ILB	32	Rick Gamboa	So
OLB	98	Jimmie Gilbert	Sr
ILB	44	Addison Gillam	Jr
OLB	96	Terran Hasselbach	So
OLB	46	Trent Headley	Jr
OLB	94	Tyler Henington	Sr
OLB	99	Aaron Howard	Sr
DB	29	Uryan Hudson	Fr
DE	52	Leo Jackson	Jr
LB	36	Akil Jones	Fr
DT	54	Samson Kafovalu	Sr
S	1	Afolabi Laguda	Jr
LB	20	Drew Lewis	So
NT	91	Eddy Lopez	So
OLB	34	Pookie Maka	Fr
DE	93	Michael Mathewes	So
OLB	95	Derek McCartney	Jr
S	25	Ryan Moeller	Jr
CB	26	Isaiah Oliver	So
ILB	31	Kenneth Olugbode (C)	Sr
OLB	3	Deaysean Rippy	Sr
DL	90	Terriek Roberts	Fr
DB	39	Jaisen Sanchez	So
S	33	Chase Sanders	Fr
ILB	30	Ryan Severson	Sr
ILB	47	Christian Shaver	Jr
LB	45	Jacob Stoltenberg	Fr
ILB	27	Travis Talianko	Sr
S	28	Daniel Talley	So
S	9	Tedric Thompson	Sr
DE	55	Brent Tonz	Fr
DB	22	Kyle Trego	So
NT	72	Lyle Tuiloma	Fr
DT	58	Josh Tupou	Sr
DB	5	Trey Udoffia	Fr
DE	50	Frank Umu	Fr
CB	23	Ahkello Witherspoon	Sr

Special teams

Pos.	#	Name	Class
LS	63	J.T. Bale	Fr
PK	10	Diego Gonzalez	Sr
PK	15	Chris Graham	Jr
PK	48	Cutler Halverson	Jr
P	89	Alex Kinney	So
PK	95	Nick Porter	Fr
PK	49	Davis Price	Fr
P	28	Cameron Silzer	Jr

Head coach

- Mike MacIntyre

Coordinators/assistant coaches

- Klayton Adams
- Gary Bernardi
- Darrin Chiaverini
- Charles Clark
- Daniel Da Prato
- Corey Edsall
- Darian Hagan
- John Hughes
- Jim Jeffcoat
- Jim Leavitt
- Brian Lindgren
- Nate Taye
- Matt Thompson
- Peter Tuitupou
- Joe Tumpkin
- Chidera Uzo-Diribe

Legend

- (C) Team captain
- (S) Suspended
- (I) Ineligible
- Injured
- Redshirt

Roster
Last update: 2016-Nov-06

== Schedule ==
Date	Time	Opponent	Rank	Site	TV	Result	Attendance
September 2	6:00 p.m.	vs. Colorado State*		Sports Authority Field at Mile High; Denver, CO (rivalry)	ESPN	W 44–7	69,850
September 10	3:30 p.m.	Idaho State*		Folsom Field; Boulder, CO	P12N	W 56–7	39,505
September 17	1:30 p.m.	at No. 4 Michigan*		Michigan Stadium; Ann Arbor, MI	BTN	L 28–45	110,042
September 24	3:30 p.m.	at Oregon		Autzen Stadium; Eugene, OR	P12N	W 41–38	53,974
October 1	12:30 p.m.	Oregon State		Folsom Field; Boulder, CO	P12N	W 47–6	46,839
October 8	2:00 p.m.	at USC	No. 21	Los Angeles Memorial Coliseum; Los Angeles, CA	P12N	L 17–21	68,302
October 15	6:00 p.m.	Arizona State^{†}		Folsom Field; Boulder, CO	P12N	W 40–16	48,588
October 22	1:00 p.m.	at Stanford		Stanford Stadium; Stanford, CA	P12N	W 10–5	44,535
November 3	7:00 p.m.	UCLA	No. 15	Folsom Field; Boulder, CO	FS1	W 20–10	43,761
November 12	8:00 p.m.	at Arizona	No. 12	Arizona Stadium; Tucson, AZ	FS1	W 49–24	41,068
November 19	1:30 p.m.	No. 22 Washington State	No. 10	Folsom Field; Boulder, CO	FOX	W 38–24	48,658
November 26	5:30 p.m.	No. 22 Utah	No. 9	Folsom Field; Boulder, CO (Rumble in the Rockies)	FOX	W 27–22	52,301
December 2	7:00 p.m.	vs. No. 4 Washington	No. 8	Levi's Stadium; Santa Clara, CA (Pac-12 Championship Game)	FOX	L 10–41	47,118
December 29	7:00 p.m.	vs. No. 12 Oklahoma State*	No. 10	Alamodome; San Antonio, TX (Alamo Bowl)	ESPN	L 8–38	59,815
*Non-conference game; ^{†}Homecoming; Rankings from AP Poll and CFP Rankings after November 1 released prior to game; All times are in Mountain time

== Rankings ==
Ranking movements Legend: ██ Increase in ranking ██ Decrease in ranking — = Not ranked RV = Received votes
	Week															
Poll	Pre	1	2	3	4	5	6	7	8	9	10	11	12	13	14	Final
AP	—	RV	RV	—	RV	21	RV	RV	23	21	16	12	9	9	11	17
Coaches	—	RV	RV	—	RV	23	RV	RV	23	20	15	12	9	9	11	15
CFP	Not released									15	12	10	9	8	10	Not released

== Game summaries ==
=== Vs. Colorado State ===
	1	2	3	4	Total
Rams	0	0	0	7	7
Buffaloes	21	10	6	7	44

=== Idaho State ===
	1	2	3	4	Total
Bengals	0	0	7	0	7
Buffaloes	14	35	7	0	56

=== At Michigan ===
	1	2	3	4	Total
Buffaloes	21	0	7	0	28
#4 Wolverines	7	17	14	7	45

=== At Oregon ===
	1	2	3	4	Total
Buffaloes	16	10	7	8	41
Ducks	7	10	21	0	38

=== Oregon State ===
	1	2	3	4	Total
Beavers	3	3	0	0	6
Buffaloes	13	24	3	7	47

=== At USC ===
	1	2	3	4	Total
#21 Buffaloes	0	0	7	10	17
Trojans	7	7	0	7	21

=== Arizona State ===
	1	2	3	4	Total
Sun Devils	7	3	3	3	16
Buffaloes	7	16	10	7	40

=== At Stanford ===
	1	2	3	4	Total
Buffaloes	0	7	0	3	10
Cardinal	3	0	0	2	5

=== UCLA ===
	1	2	3	4	Total
Bruins	7	3	0	0	10
#21 Buffaloes	7	0	3	10	20

=== At Arizona ===
	1	2	3	4	Total
#16 Buffaloes	7	21	14	7	49
Wildcats	0	10	0	14	24

=== Washington State ===
	1	2	3	4	Total
#20 Cougars	14	3	7	0	24
#12 Buffaloes	7	7	14	10	38

=== Utah ===
#22 Utah Utes at #9 Colorado Buffaloes

Quarter	1	2	3	4	Total
#22 Utes	7	0	6	9	22
#9 Buffaloes	7	6	7	7	27

at Folsom Field • Boulder, CO

- Date: November 26, 2016
- Game time: 5:30 p.m. MT
- Game attendance: 52,301
- TV: FOX
- Source

Game information

First quarter

- (9:17) UTAH TD: Boobie Hobbs 55-yard punt return (Andy Phillips PAT).
- (0:00) COLO TD: Sefo Liufau 2-yard rush (Davis Price PAT).

Second quarter

- (9;20) COLO FG: Chris Graham 25-yard field goal.
- (5:21) COLO FG: Chris Graham 19-yard field goal.

Third quarter

- (11:54) UTAH FG: Andy Phillips 22-yard field goal.
- (2:58) UTAH FG: Andy Phillips 22-yard field goal.
- (0:00) COLO TD: Sefo Liufau 6-yard pass to Shay Fields (Davis Price PAT).

Fourth quarter

- (13:53) UTAH FG: Andy Phillips 23-yard field goal.
- (10:56) COLO TD: Kenneth Olugbode 10-yard fumble return (Davis Price PAT).
- (1:3$) UTAH TD: Troy Williams 7-yard pass to Demari Simpkins (2-pt. no good).

Top passers

- UTAH – Troy Williams – 13/40, 160 yards, TD, 2 INT
- COLO – Sefo Liufau – 23/44, 270 yards, TD

Top rushers

- UTAH – Joe Williams – 26 carries, 97 yards
- COLO – Sefo Liufau – 21 carries, 59 yards, TD

Top receiving

- UTAH – Tim Patrick – 5 receptions, 78 yards
- COLO – Devin Ross – 9 receptions, 94 yards

=== vs Washington (Pac-12 Championship game) ===
Colorado Buffaloes vs Washington Huskies (Pac-12 Championship game)

Quarter	1	2	3	4	Total
#9 Buffaloes	7	0	3	0	10
#4 Huskies	7	7	17	10	41

at Levi's Stadium • Santa Clara, CA

- Date: December 2, 2016
- Game time: 7:00 p.m. MT
- Game attendance: 47,118
- TV: FOX

Game information

First quarter
Second quarter
Third quarter
Fourth quarter

Top passers

- WASH –
- COLO –

Top rushers

- WASH –
- COLO –

Top receiving

- WASH –
- COLO –

=== vs Oklahoma State (Alamo Bowl) ===
	1	2	3	4	Total
#13 Cowboys	3	14	14	7	38
#11 Buffaloes	0	0	0	8	8

== Awards and honors ==
Season Awards
Person	Award	Date awarded	Ref.
Mike MacIntyre	Pac-12 Coach of the Year	September 30, 2016	
Mike MacIntyre	Walter Camp Coach of the Year Award	December 1, 2016	
