= Lavon Coleman =

American football player (born 1994)

No. 24
- Position: Running back

Personal information
- Born: December 10, 1994 (age 31); Lompoc, California, U.S.
- Listed height: 5 ft 11 in (1.80 m)
- Listed weight: 216 lb (98 kg)

Career information
- High school: Lompoc
- College: Washington
- NFL draft: 2018: undrafted

Career history
- Houston Texans (2018)*; Seattle Seahawks (2018)*; Green Bay Packers (2018); Seattle Dragons (2020)*; TSL Jousters (2021)
- * Offseason or practice squad member only
- Stats at Pro Football Reference

Lavon Coleman (born December 10, 1994) is an American former professional football player who was a running back in the National Football League (NFL). He played college football for the Washington Huskies. Coleman has since coached football at high schools in Washington.

== Professional career ==
=== Houston Texans ===
Coleman was signed by the Houston Texans as an undrafted free agent on May 11, 2018. He was waived on September 1, 2018.

=== Seattle Seahawks ===
On September 3, 2018, Coleman was signed to the Seattle Seahawks practice squad. He was released on October 23, 2018.

=== Green Bay Packers ===
On October 31, 2018, Coleman was signed to the Green Bay Packers practice squad. He was promoted to the active roster on December 22, 2018. He was waived on May 6, 2019.

=== Seattle Dragons ===
In October 2019, Coleman was selected by the Seattle Dragons during the open phase of the 2020 XFL draft. He was waived during final roster cuts on January 22, 2020.

== Coaching career ==
=== Interlake Saints ===
On February 13, 2024, Coleman was named head football coach at Interlake High School in Bellevue, Washington. In his only season with the Saints, the varsity team's record was 7-2, earning a second place district finish.

=== Sunnyside Grizzlies ===
On January 24, 2026, Coleman was named head football coach at Sunnyside High School in Sunnyside, Washington after Marshall Lobbestael, a former Washington State quarterback, stepped down from the position. Coleman was placed on administrative leave on September 24, 2026.
