= 2016 Pac-12 Conference football season =

American college football season

- League: NCAA Division I Football Bowl Subdivision
- Sport: American football
- Teams: 12
- TV partner(s): Fox Sports Media Group (Fox, FS1), ESPN Family (ABC, ESPN, ESPN2, ESPNU), CBS (bowl game, and Pac-12 Networks

2017 NFL Draft
- Top draft pick: DE Solomon Thomas, Stanford
- Picked by: San Francisco 49ers, 3rd overall

Regular season
- Top scorer: Cameron Van Winkle (123 points)
- North champions: Washington Huskies
- North runners-up: Washington State Cougars
- South champions: Colorado Buffaloes
- South runners-up: USC Trojans

Pac-12 Championship
- Champions: Washington Huskies
- Runners-up: Colorado Buffaloes
- Finals MVP: Taylor Rapp, DB

Football seasons
- 2015 2017

2016 Pac-12 Conference football standings
	Conf.			Overall
Team	W		L	W		L
North Division
No. 4 Washington xy$^	8	–	1	12	–	2
Washington State	7	–	2	8	–	5
No. 12 Stanford	6	–	3	10	–	3
California	3	–	6	5	–	7
Oregon State	3	–	6	4	–	8
Oregon	2	–	7	4	–	8
South Division
No. 17 Colorado xy	8	–	1	10	–	4
No. 3 USC	7	–	2	10	–	3
No. 23 Utah	5	–	4	9	–	4
Arizona State	2	–	7	5	–	7
UCLA	2	–	7	4	–	8
Arizona	1	–	8	3	–	9
Championship: Washington 41, Colorado 10
^ – College Football Playoff participant; $ – Conference champion; x – Division champion/co-champions; y – Championship game participant; Rankings from AP Poll

The 2016 Pac-12 Conference football season is the sixth season for the conference as a twelve-team league. The season began on August 26, 2016, with California vs. Hawaii. The final game was the 2016 Pac-12 Football Championship Game at Levi's Stadium on December 2, 2016, with Fox televising the game.

== Preseason ==
2016 Pac-12 Spring Football and number of signees on signing day:

North Division

- California – 25 signees
- Oregon – 19 signees
- Oregon State – 24 signees
- Stanford – 30 signees
- Washington – 18 signees
- Washington State – 25 signees

South Division

- Arizona – 22 signees
- Arizona State – 18 signees
- Colorado –18 signees
- UCLA – 27 signees
- USC – 13 signees
- Utah – 24 signees

=== Pac-12 Media ===
The Pac-12 conducted its annual media days at the Loews Hollywood Hotel, – The Loews Hollywood Hotel in Hollywood, California between July 14 and July 15. The event commenced with a speech by Pac-12 commissioner Larry Scott, and all 12 teams sent their head coaches and two selected players to speak with members of the media. The event along with all speakers and interviews were broadcast live on the Pac-12 Network. The teams and representatives in respective order were as follows:

Thursday

- Arizona – Head Coach Rich Rodriguez, Nate Phillips, WR & Sani Fuimaono, DL
- California – Head Coach Sonny Dykes, Steven Moore, OT & DeVante Wilson, DE
- Oregon – Head Coach Mark Helfrich, Royce Freeman, RB & Johnny Ragin, LB
- Washington State – Head Coach Mike Leach, Gabe Marks, WR & Parker Henry, LB
- Utah – Head Coach Kyle Whittingham, JJ Dielman, OT & Justin Thomas, DB

Friday

- Arizona State – Head Coach Todd Graham, Tim White, WR/KR & Tashon Smallwood, DL
- Oregon State – Head Coach Gary Andersen, Victor Bolden, WR & Nick Porebski, P
- UCLA – Head Coach Jim Mora, Conor McDermott, OT & Jayon Brown, LB
- Stanford – Head Coach David Shaw, Christian McCaffrey, RB & Solomon Thomas, DE
- Washington – Head Coach Chris Petersen, Darrell Daniels, TE & Kevin King, DB
- Colorado – Head Coach Mike MacIntyre, Sefo Liufau, QB & Chidobe Awuzie, CB

==== Preseason Media Polls ====
Pac-12 Championship Game Voting

North Division

1. Stanford Cardinal (24 pts., 186 votes)
2. Washington Huskies (8 pts., 163 votes)
3. Oregon Ducks (1 pt., 132 votes)
4. Washington State Cougars (112 votes)
5. California Golden Bears (67 votes)
6. Oregon State Beavers (33 votes)

South Division

1. UCLA Bruins (19 pts., 180 votes)
2. USC Trojans (12 pts., 173 votes)
3. Utah Utes (2 pts., 127 votes)
4. Arizona Wildcats (87 votes)
5. Arizona State Sun Devils (85 votes)
6. Colorado Buffaloes (63 votes)

- Predicted Pac-12 Championship Game Winner: Stanford Cardinal (20 points) was picked to win the Pac-12 Championship over UCLA (19) for the first time since 1960. Others receiving votes were Washington, ASU (3), USC (2), Oregon (1) and Utah (2).

=== Recruiting classes ===
Rankings
Team	ESPN	Rivals	Scout	24/7	Signees
Arizona	39	41	41	42	25
Arizona State	26	20	17	19	22
California	-	29	36	34	24
Colorado	-	71	75	69	19
Oregon	15	17	21	16	22
Oregon State	-	71	63	60	22
Stanford	27	18	25	24	22
UCLA	11	13	9	12	18
USC	3	1	1	2	26
Utah	-	41	53	45	20
Washington	28	30	23	27	24
Washington State	-	55	38	41	24

== Head coaches ==
=== Coaching changes ===
There were no coaching changes following the 2016 season.

=== Coaches ===
Team	Head coach	Years at school	Overall record	Record at school	Pac-12 record
Arizona	Rich Rodriguez	5	155–112–2 (.580)	35–28 (.556)	17–25 (.405)
Arizona State	Todd Graham	5	88–53 (.624)	39–24 (.619)	25–18 (.581)
California	Sonny Dykes	4	40–44 (.476)	18–29 (.383)	9–25 (.265)
Colorado	Mike MacIntyre	4	34–50 (.405)	18–29 (.383)	8–26 (.235)
Oregon	Mark Helfrich	4	36–15 (.706)	36–15 (.706)	23–11 (.676)
Oregon State	Gary Andersen	2	53–56 (.486)	4–18 (.182)	1–15 (.063)
Stanford	David Shaw	6	61–17 (.782)	61–17 (.782)	42–12 (.778)
UCLA	Jim L. Mora	5	41–22 (.651)	41–22 (.651)	25–18 (.581)
USC	Clay Helton	3	13–7 (.650)	13–7 (.650)	11–3 (.786)
Utah	Kyle Whittingham	12	103–48 (.682)	103–48 (.682)	25–27 (.481)
Washington	Chris Petersen	3	116–25 (.823)	24–13 (.649)	14–11 (.560)
Washington State	Mike Leach	5	113–74 (.604)	29–31 (.483)	20–23 (.465)

Note: Stats shown are before the beginning of the season

== Rankings ==
	Increase in ranking
	Decrease in ranking
	Not ranked previous week
	Selected for College Football Playoff
(Italics)	Number of first place votes
т	Tied with team above or below also with this symbol

		Pre	Wk 2	Wk 3	Wk 4	Wk 5	Wk 6	Wk 7	Wk 8	Wk 9	Wk 10	Wk 11	Wk 12	Wk 13	Wk 14	Wk 15	Final
Arizona Wildcats	AP																
Arizona Wildcats	C	RV															
Arizona Wildcats	CFP	Not released															
Arizona State Sun Devils	AP			RV	RV	RV	RV	RV	RV								
Arizona State Sun Devils	C			RV	RV	RV	RV	24	RV								
Arizona State Sun Devils	CFP	Not released															
California Golden Bears	AP				RV		RV										
California Golden Bears	C				RV		RV										
California Golden Bears	CFP	Not released															
Colorado Buffaloes	AP		RV	RV	RV	RV	21	RV	RV	23	21	16	12	9	9	11	
Colorado Buffaloes	C		RV	RV	RV	RV	23	RV	RV	23	20	15	12	9	9	11	
Colorado Buffaloes	CFP	Not released									15	12	10	9	8	10	
Oregon Ducks	AP	24	24	22	RV												
Oregon Ducks	C	22	23	21	RV	RV											
Oregon Ducks	CFP	Not released															
Oregon State Beavers	AP																
Oregon State Beavers	C																
Oregon State Beavers	CFP	Not released															
Stanford Cardinal	AP	8	7	7	7	7	15	RV	RV				RV	RV	17	16	
Stanford Cardinal	C	7	5	6	6	6	15	RV	RV			RV	RV	RV	17	16	
Stanford Cardinal	CFP	Not released											24	24	18	18	
UCLA Bruins	AP	16	RV	RV	RV	RV	RV										
UCLA Bruins	C	24	RV	RV	RV	RV	RV										
UCLA Bruins	CFP	Not released															
USC Trojans	AP	20							RV	RV	RV	RV	15	12	10	9	3
USC Trojans	C	17	RV				RV	RV	RV	RV	RV	RV	19	12	11	9	5
USC Trojans	CFP	Not released										20	13	12	11	9	
Utah Utes	AP	RV	RV	RV	24	18	24	21	19	17	16	13	11	21	RV	RV	
Utah Utes	C	RV	RV	RV	23	18	24	21	18	16	16	12	11	20	24	23	
Utah Utes	CFP	Not released									16	15	12	22	20	19	
Washington Huskies	AP	14	8	8	9	10	5	5	5	4	4	4	7	6	4	4	4
Washington Huskies	C	18	11	9	9	9	6	5	5	4	4	4	7	5	4	4	4
Washington Huskies	CFP	Not released									5	4	6	5	4	4	
Washington State Cougars	AP	RV						RV	RV	RV	25	23	20	23	RV	RV	
Washington State Cougars	C	RV						RV	RV	RV	25	23	20	23	RV	RV	
Washington State Cougars	CFP	Not released									25	23	22	23			

== Schedule ==
Index to colors and formatting
Pac-12 member won
Pac-12 member lost
Pac-12 teams in **bold**

All times Mountain time. Pac-12 teams in bold.

Rankings reflect those of the AP poll for that week.

=== Week 1 ===
Date	Time	Visiting team	Home team	Site	TV	Result	Attendance	Ref.
Friday, August 26	7:00 pm	Hawaii	**California**	ANZ Stadium • Sydney, Australia	ESPN	**W** 51–31	61,247	
Thursday, September 1	5:00 pm	Southern Utah	**Utah**	Rice-Eccles Stadium • Salt Lake City	P12N	**W** 24–0	45,945	
Thursday, September 1	6:00 pm	**Oregon State**	Minnesota	TCF Bank Stadium • Minneapolis	BTN	**L** 23–30	44,582	
Friday, September 2	5:00 pm	Colorado State	**Colorado**	Sports Authority Field at Mile High • Denver (Rocky Mountain Showdown)	ESPN	**W** 44–7	69,850	
Friday, September 2	6:00 pm	Kansas State	No. 8 **Stanford**	Stanford Stadium • Stanford, California	FS1	**W** 26–13	46,147	
Saturday, September 3	11:00 am	Rutgers	No. 14 **Washington**	Husky Stadium • Seattle	P12N	**W** 48–13	58,640	
Saturday, September 3	12:30 pm	No. 16 **UCLA**	Texas A&M	Kyle Field • College Station, Texas	CBS	**L** 24–31 ^{OT}	100,443	
Saturday, September 3	2:00 pm	UC Davis	No. 24 **Oregon**	Autzen Stadium • Eugene, Oregon	P12N	**W** 53–28	53,817	
Saturday, September 3	5:00 pm	No. 20 **USC**	No. 1 Alabama	AT&T Stadium • Arlington, Texas	ABC	**L** 6–52	81,359	
Saturday, September 3	5:00 pm	Eastern Washington	**Washington State**	Martin Stadium • Pullman, Washington	P12N	**L** 42–45	32,952	
Saturday, September 3	7:30 pm	BYU	**Arizona**	University of Phoenix Stadium • Glendale, Arizona	FS1	**L** 16–18	50,528	
Saturday, September 3	7:45 pm	Northern Arizona	**Arizona State**	Sun Devil Stadium • Tempe, Arizona	P12N	**W** 44–13	45,300	
^{#}Rankings from AP Poll released prior to game. All times are in Pacific Time.

Players of the Week – Sept 5

Offensive		Defensive		Special teams	
Player	Team	Player	Team	Player	Team
Sefo Liufau	Colorado	Troy Dye	Oregon	Mitch Wishnowsky	Utah

=== Week 2 ===
Date	Time	Visiting team	Home team	Site	TV	Result	Attendance	Ref.
Saturday, September 10	11:00 am	Utah State	**USC**	Los Angeles Memorial Coliseum • Los Angeles	P12N	**W** 45–7	62,487	
Saturday, September 10	2:00 pm	Idaho	No. 8 **Washington**	Husky Stadium • Seattle	P12N	**W** 59–14	60,678	
Saturday, September 10	2:30 pm	Idaho State	**Colorado**	Folsom Field • Boulder, Colorado	P12N	**W** 56–7	39,505	
Saturday, September 10	4:30 pm	BYU	**Utah**	Rice-Eccles Stadium • Salt Lake City	Fox	**W** 20–19	46,915	
Saturday, September 10	5:00 pm	UNLV	**UCLA**	Rose Bowl • Pasadena, California	P12N	**W** 42–21	63,712	
Saturday, September 10	7:00 pm	Texas Tech	**Arizona State**	Sun Devil Stadium • Tempe, Arizona	FS1	**W** 68–55	44,511	
Saturday, September 10	7:15 pm	Boise State	**Washington State**	Albertsons Stadium • Boise, Idaho	ESPN2	**L** 28–31	36,163	
Saturday, September 10	7:30 pm	**California**	San Diego State	Qualcomm Stadium • San Diego	CBSSN	**L** 40–45	42,473	
Saturday, September 10	7:30 pm	Virginia	No. 24 **Oregon**	Autzen Stadium • Eugene, Oregon	ESPN	**W** 44–26	53,774	
Saturday, September 10	7:45 pm	Grambling State	**Arizona**	Arizona Stadium • Tucson, Arizona	P12N	**W** 31–21	45,686	
^{#}Rankings from AP Poll released prior to game. All times are in Pacific Time.

Players of the Week- Sept 12

Offensive		Defensive		Special teams	
Player	Team	Player	Team	Player	Team
Kalen Ballage	Arizona State	Sunia Tauteoli	Utah	Adoree' Jackson	USC

=== Week 3 ===
Date	Time	Visiting team	Home team	Site	TV	Result	Attendance	Ref.
Friday, September 16	6:30 pm	**Arizona State**	UTSA	Alamodome • San Antonio	ESPN2	**W** 32–28	29,035	
Saturday, September 17	11:00 am	Idaho	**Washington State**	Martin Stadium • Pullman, Washington	P12N	**W** 56–6	28,477	
Saturday, September 17	12:30 pm	No. 22 **Oregon**	Nebraska	Memorial Stadium • Lincoln, Nebraska	ABC	**L** 32–35	90,414	
Saturday, September 17	1:30 pm	**Colorado**	No. 4 Michigan	Michigan Stadium • Ann Arbor, Michigan	BTN	**L** 28–45	110,042	
Saturday, September 17	2:00 pm	Idaho State	**Oregon State**	Reser Stadium • Corvallis, Oregon	P12N	**W** 37–7	38,052	
Saturday, September 17	5:00 pm	**USC**	No. 7 **Stanford**	Stanford Stadium • Stanford, California	ABC	**STAN** 27–10	48,763	
Saturday, September 17	5:00 pm	Portland State	No. 8 **Washington**	Husky Stadium • Seattle	P12N	**W** 41–3	57,151	
Saturday, September 17	7:15 pm	**UCLA**	BYU	LaVell Edwards Stadium • Provo, Utah	ESPN2	**W** 17–14	62,904	
Saturday, September 17	7:30 pm	No. 11 Texas	**California**	California Memorial Stadium • Berkeley, California	ESPN	**W** 50–43	50,448	
Saturday, September 17	7:30 pm	**Utah**	San Jóse State	Spartan Stadium • San Jose, California	CBSSN	**W** 34–17	16,041	
Saturday, September 17	7:45 pm	Hawaii	**Arizona**	Arizona Stadium • Tucson, Arizona	P12N	**W** 47–28	50,116	
^{#}Rankings from AP Poll released prior to game. All times are in Pacific Time.

Players of the Week – Sept 19

Offensive		Defensive		Special teams	
Player	Team	Player	Team	Player	Team
Chad Hansen	California	Treston Decoud	Oregon State	Zane Gonzalez	Arizona State

=== Week 4 ===
Date	Time	Visiting team	Home team	Site	TV	Result	Attendance	Ref.
Friday, September 23	6:00 pm	**USC**	No. 24 **Utah**	Rice-Eccles Stadium • Salt Lake City	FS1	**UTAH** 31–27	46,133	
Saturday, September 24	12:30 pm	Boise State	**Oregon State**	Reser Stadium • Corvallis, Oregon	FS1	**L** 24–38	42,846	
Saturday, September 24	2:30 pm	**Colorado**	**Oregon**	Autzen Stadium • Eugene, Oregon	P12N	**COLO** 41–38	53,974	
Saturday, September 24	5:00 pm	No. 7 **Stanford**	**UCLA**	Rose Bowl • Pasadena, California	ABC	**STAN** 22–13	70,833	
Saturday, September 24	7:00 pm	**California**	**Arizona State**	Sun Devil Stadium • Tempe, Arizona	ESPN2	**ASU** 51–41	49,295	
Saturday, September 24	7:30 pm	No. 9 **Washington**	**Arizona**	Arizona Stadium • Tucson, Arizona	P12N	**WASH** 35–28 ^{OT}	48,747	
^{#}Rankings from AP Poll released prior to game. All times are in Pacific Time.

Players of the Week – Sept 26

Offensive		Defensive		Special teams	
Player	Team	Player	Team	Player	Team
Steven Montez	Colorado	Solomon Thomas	Stanford	Zane Gonzalez	Arizona State

=== Week 5 ===
Date	Time	Visiting team	Home team	Site	TV	Result	Attendance	Ref.
Friday September 30	6:00 pm	No. 7 **Stanford**	No. 10 **Washington**	Husky Stadium • Seattle	ESPN	**WASH** 44–6	72,027	
Saturday, October 1	11:30 am	**Oregon State**	**Colorado**	Folsom Field • Boulder, Colorado	P12N	**COLO** 47–6	46,839	
Saturday, October 1	3:00 pm	No. 18 **Utah**	**California**	California Memorial Stadium • Berkeley, California	P12N	**CAL** 28–23	46,618	
Saturday, October 1	5:30 pm	**Arizona State**	**USC**	Los Angeles Memorial Coliseum • Los Angeles	Fox	**USC** 44–21	71,214	
Saturday October 1	6:30 pm	**Oregon**	**Washington State**	Martin Stadium • Pullman, Washington	P12N	**WSU** 51–33	32,952	
Saturday, October 1	7:30 pm	**Arizona**	**UCLA**	Rose Bowl • Pasadena CA	ESPN	**UCLA** 45–24	68,013	
^{#}Rankings from AP Poll released prior to game. All times are in Pacific Time.

Players of the Week – Oct 3

Offensive		Defensive		Special teams	
Player	Team	Player	Team	Player	Team
Davis Webb	California	Psalm Wooching	Washington	Davis Price	Colorado

=== Week 6 ===
Date	Time	Visiting team	Home team	Site	TV	Result	Attendance	Ref.
Saturday, October 8	1:00 pm	No. 21 **Colorado**	**USC**	Los Angeles Memorial Coliseum • Los Angeles	P12N	**USC** 21–17	68,302	
Saturday, October 8	4:30 pm	No. 5 **Washington**	**Oregon**	Autzen Stadium • Eugene, Oregon	Fox	**WASH** 70–21	58,842	
Saturday, October 8	6:00 pm	**California**	**Oregon State**	Reser Stadium • Corvallis, Oregon	P12N	**OSU** 47–44 ^{OT}	34,066	
Saturday, October 8	7:00 pm	**Arizona**	No. 24 **Utah**	Rice-Eccles Stadium • Salt Lake City	FS1	**UTAH** 36–23	45,917	
Saturday, October 8	7:30 pm	**UCLA**	**Arizona State**	Sun Devil Stadium • Tempe, Arizona	ESPN2	**ASU** 23–20	48,509	
Saturday, October 8	7:30 pm	**Washington State**	No. 15 **Stanford**	Stanford Stadium • Stanford, California	ESPN	**WSU** 42–16	50,424	
^{#}Rankings from AP Poll released prior to game. All times are in Pacific Time.

Players of the Week – Oct 10

Offensive		Defensive		Special teams	
Player	Team	Player	Team	Player	Team
Jake Browning	Washington	Marcus Ball	Arizona State	Zane Gonzalez	Arizona State

=== Week 7 ===
Date	Time	Visiting team	Home team	Site	TV	Result	Attendance	Ref.
Saturday, October 15	12:30 pm	**USC**	**Arizona**	Arizona Stadium • Tucson, Arizona	Fox	**USC** 48–14	55,463	
Saturday, October 15	1:00 pm	No. 21 **Utah**	**Oregon State**	Reser Stadium • Corvallis, Oregon	P12N	**UTAH** 19–14	32,093	
Saturday, October 15	4:30 pm	**Stanford**	Notre Dame	Notre Dame Stadium • South Bend, Indiana (Legends Trophy)	NBC	**W** 17–10	80,795	
Saturday, October 15	5:00 pm	**Arizona State**	**Colorado**	Folsom Field • Boulder, Colorado	P12N	**COLO** 40–16	48,588	
Saturday, October 15	7:30 pm	**UCLA**	**Washington State**	Martin Stadium • Pullman, Washington	ESPN	**WSU** 27–21	29,310	
^{#}Rankings from AP Poll released prior to game. All times are in Pacific Time.

Players of the Week – Oct 17

Offensive		Defensive		Special teams	
Player	Team	Player	Team	Player	Team
Phillip Lindsay	Colorado	Solomon Thomas	Stanford	Zane Gonzalez	Arizona State

=== Week 8 ===
Date	Time	Visiting team	Home team	Site	TV	Result	Attendance	Ref.
Friday, October 21	7:30 pm	**Oregon**	**California**	California Memorial Stadium • Berkeley, California	ESPN	**CAL** 52–49 ^{2OT}	43,048	
Saturday, October 22	12:00 pm	**Colorado**	**Stanford**	Stanford Stadium • Stanford, California	P12N	**COLO** 10–5	44,535	
Saturday, October 22	1:00 pm	No. 19 **Utah**	**UCLA**	Rose Bowl • Pasadena, California	Fox	**UTAH** 52–45	66,243	
Saturday, October 22	3:30 pm	**Oregon State**	No. 5 **Washington**	Husky Stadium • Seattle	P12N	**WASH** 41–17	65,796	
Saturday, October 22	7:00 pm	**Washington State**	**Arizona State**	Sun Devil Stadium • Tempe, Arizona	P12N	**WSU** 37-32	50,582	
^{#}Rankings from AP Poll released prior to game. All times are in Pacific Time.

Players of the Week – Oct 24

Offensive		Defensive		Special teams	
Player	Team	Player	Team	Player	Team
Joe Williams	Utah	Tedric Thompson	Colorado	Robert Taylor	Washington State

=== Week 9 ===
Date	Time	Visiting team	Home team	Site	TV	Result	Attendance	Ref.
Thursday, October 27	7:30 pm	**California**	**USC**	Los Angeles Memorial Coliseum • Los Angeles	ESPN	**USC** 45–24	61,725	
Saturday, October 29	12:30 pm	No. 4 **Washington**	No. 17 **Utah**	Rice-Eccles Stadium • Salt Lake City	FS1	**WASH** 31–24	47,801	
Saturday, October 29	2:00 pm	**Arizona State**	**Oregon**	Autzen Stadium • Eugene, Oregon	P12N	**ORE** 54–35	53,898	
Saturday, October 29	7:45 pm	**Washington State**	**Oregon State**	Reser Stadium • Corvallis, Oregon	ESPN2	**WSU** 35–31	37,081	
Saturday, October 29	8:00 pm	**Stanford**	**Arizona**	Arizona Stadium • Tucson, Arizona	FS1	**STAN** 34–10	46,740	
^{#}Rankings from AP Poll released prior to game. All times are in Pacific Time.

Players of the Week – Oct 31

Offensive		Defensive		Special teams	
Player	Team	Player	Team	Player	Team
Justin Herbert	Oregon	Azeem Victor	Washington	Dante Pettis	Washington

=== Week 10 ===
Date	Time	Visiting team	Home team	Site	TV	Result	Attendance	Ref.
Thursday, November 3	6:00 pm	**UCLA**	**Colorado**	Folsom Field • Boulder, Colorado	FS1	**COLO** 20–10	43,761	
Saturday, November 5	12:30 pm	**Oregon State**	**Stanford**	Stanford Stadium • Stanford, California	FS1	**STAN** 26–15	38,813	
Saturday, November 5	1:00 pm	**Arizona**	No. 25 **Washington State**	Martin Stadium • Pullman, Washington	P12N	**WSU** 69–7	33,547	
Saturday, November 5	4:00 pm	**Oregon**	**USC**	Los Angeles Memorial Coliseum • Los Angeles	ESPN	**USC** 45–20	74,625	
Saturday, November 5	7:30 pm	No. 5 **Washington**	**California**	California Memorial Stadium • Berkeley, California	ESPN	**WASH** 66–27	47,756	
^{#}Rankings from AP Poll released prior to game. All times are in Pacific Time.

Players of the Week – Nov 7

Offensive		Defensive		Special teams	
Player	Team	Player	Team	Player	Team
John Ross III	Washington	Sidney Jones	Washington	Isaiah Oliver	Colorado

=== Week 11 ===
Date	Time	Visiting team	Home team	Site	TV	Result	Attendance	Ref.
Thursday, November 10	6:30 pm	No. 13 **Utah**	**Arizona State**	Sun Devil Stadium • Tempe, Arizona	FS1	**UTAH** 49–26	48,220	
Saturday, November 12	1:00 pm	**Stanford**	**Oregon**	Autzen Stadium • Eugene, Oregon	P12N	**STAN** 52–27	53,757	
Saturday, November 12	4:30 pm	**USC**	No. 4 **Washington**	Husky Stadium • Seattle	FOX	**USC** 26–13	72,364	
Saturday, November 12	6:00 pm	**Oregon State**	**UCLA**	Rose Bowl • Pasadena, California	P12N	**UCLA** 38–24	64,813	
Saturday, November 12	7:00 pm	No. 16 **Colorado**	**Arizona**	Arizona Stadium • Tucson, Arizona	FS1	**COLO** 49–24	41,068	
Saturday, November 12	7:30 pm	**California**	No. 23 **Washington State**	Martin Stadium • Pullman, Washington	ESPN	**WSU** 56–21	30,135	
^{#}Rankings from AP Poll released prior to game. All times are in Pacific Time.

Players of the Week – Nov 14

Offensive		Defensive		Special teams	
Player	Team	Player	Team	Player	Team
Sam Darnold	USC	Hunter Dimick	Utah	Kaleb Fossum	Washington State

=== Week 12 ===
Date	Time	Visiting team	Home team	Site	TV	Result	Attendance	Ref.
Saturday, November 19	11:00 am	**Oregon**	No. 11 **Utah**	Rice-Eccles Stadium • Salt Lake City	P12N	**ORE** 30–28	46,327	
Saturday, November 19	12:30 pm	No. 20 **Washington State**	No. 12 **Colorado**	Folsom Field • Boulder, Colorado	FOX	**COLO** 38–24	48,658	
Saturday, November 19	2:30 pm	**Stanford**	**California**	California Memorial Stadium • Berkeley, California (119th Big Game/Stanford Axe)	P12N	**STAN** 45–31	52,266	
Saturday, November 19	4:30 pm	**Arizona State**	No. 7 **Washington**	Husky Stadium • Seattle	FOX	**WASH** 44–18	65,467	
Saturday, November 19	7:30 pm	No. 15 **USC**	**UCLA**	Rose Bowl • Pasadena, California (Victory Bell)	ESPN	**USC** 36–14	71,137	
Saturday, November 19	7:30 pm	**Arizona**	**Oregon State**	Reser Stadium • Corvallis, Oregon	P12N	**OSU** 42–17	35,059	
^{#}Rankings from AP Poll released prior to game. All times are in Pacific Time.

Players of the Week – Nov 21

Offensive		Defensive		Special teams	
Player	Team	Player	Team	Player	Team
Sefo Liufau	Colorado	Nick Fisher	Colorado	Mitch Wishnowsky	Utah

=== Week 13 ===
Date	Time	Visiting team	Home team	Site	TV	Result	Attendance	Ref.
Friday, November 25	12:30 pm	No. 6 **Washington**	No. 23 **Washington State**	Martin Stadium • Pullman, Washington (Apple Cup)	FS1	**WASH** 45–17	33,773	
Friday, November 25	6:30 pm	**Arizona State**	**Arizona**	Arizona Stadium • Tucson, Arizona (Territorial Cup)	ESPN	**ARZ** 56–35	50,197	
Saturday, November 26	12:30 pm	Notre Dame	No. 13 **USC**	Los Angeles Memorial Coliseum • Los Angeles (Jeweled Shillelagh)	ABC	**W** 45–27	72,402	
Saturday, November 26	1:00 pm	**Oregon**	**Oregon State**	Reser Stadium • Corvallis, Oregon (Civil War)	P12N	**OSU** 34–24	44,160	
Saturday, November 26	4:00 pm	**UCLA**	**California**	California Memorial Stadium • Berkeley, California (California–UCLA rivalry)	ESPN2	**CAL** 36–10	39,633	
Saturday, November 26	4:30 pm	No. 21 **Utah**	No. 9 **Colorado**	Folsom Field • Boulder, Colorado (Rumble in the Rockies)	FOX	**COLO** 27–22	52,301	
Saturday, November 26	5:00 pm	Rice	**Stanford**	Stanford Stadium • Stanford, California	P12N	**W** 41–17	36,171	
^{#}Rankings from AP Poll released prior to game. All times are in Pacific Time.

Players of the Week – Nov 28

Offensive		Defensive		Special teams	
Player	Team	Player	Team	Player	Team
Ryan Nall	Oregon State	Tedric Thompson	Colorado	Adoree’ Jackson	USC

=== Championship game ===
The championship game was played on December 2, 2016. It featured the teams with the best conference records from each division, Washington from the North and Colorado from the South. This was the sixth championship game (and the sixth win for the North), with both Washington and Colorado appearing for the first time.

==== Week 14 (Pac-12 Championship Game) ====
Date	Time	Visiting team	Home team	Site	TV	Result	Attendance	Ref.
Friday, December 2	6:00 pm	No. 9 Colorado	No. 4 Washington	Levi's Stadium • Santa Clara, California (Pac-12 Championship)	ESPN	**WASH** 41–10	47,118	
^{#}Rankings from AP Poll released prior to game. All times are in Pacific Time.

== Pac-12 vs Power Conference matchups ==
This is a list of the power conference teams (ACC, Big 10, Big 12 and SEC along with independents Notre Dame and BYU) the Pac-12 plays in the non-conference (Rankings from the AP Poll):

Date	Visitor	Home	Site	Significance	Score
September 1	Oregon State	Minnesota	TCF Bank Stadium • Minneapolis		Minnesota 30–23
September 2	Kansas State	#8 Stanford	Stanford Stadium • Stanford, California		Stanford 26–13
September 3	BYU	Arizona	University of Phoenix Stadium • Glendale, Arizona	Cactus Kickoff Classic	BYU 18–16
September 3	#20 USC	#1 Alabama	AT&T Stadium • Arlington, Texas	Advocare Classic	Alabama 52–6
September 3	#16 UCLA	Texas A&M	Kyle Field • College Station, Texas		Texas A&M 31–24^{OT}
September 3	Rutgers	#14 Washington	Husky Stadium • Seattle		Washington 48–13
September 10	Texas Tech	Arizona State	Sun Devil Stadium • Tempe, Arizona		Arizona State 68–55
September 10	BYU	Utah	Rice-Eccles Stadium • Salt Lake City	Holy War	Utah 20–19
September 10	Virginia	#24 Oregon	Autzen Stadium • Eugene, Oregon		Oregon 44–26
September 17	UCLA	BYU	LaVell Edwards Stadium • Provo, Utah		UCLA 17–14
October 15	Stanford	Notre Dame	Notre Dame Stadium • South Bend, Indiana	Notre Dame–Stanford football rivalry	Stanford 17–10
November 26	Notre Dame	USC	Los Angeles Memorial Coliseum • Los Angeles	Notre Dame–USC football rivalry	USC 45–27

=== Records against other conferences ===
2016 records against non-conference foes:

Regular Season

Power 5 Conferences	Record
ACC	1–0
Big Ten	1–3
Big 12	3–0
SEC	0–2
Notre Dame	2–0
Power 5 Total	7–5
Other FBS Conferences	Record
American	0–0
C-USA	2–0
MAC	0–0
Mountain West	6–3
Independents (Excluding Notre Dame)	2–1
Sun Belt	2–0
Other FBS Total	12–4
FCS Opponents	Record
Football Championship Subdivision	7–1
Total Non-Conference Record	26–10

Post Season

Power Conferences 5	Record
ACC	1–0
Big Ten	2–1
Big 12	0–1
SEC	0–1
Power 5 Total	3–3
Other FBS Conferences	Record
American	0–0
C–USA	0–0
Independents (Excluding Notre Dame)	0–0
MAC	0–0
Mountain West	0–0
Sun Belt	0-0
Other FBS Total	0–0
Total Bowl Record	3–3

== Postseason ==
=== Bowl games ===
Legend
Pac-12 win
Pac-12 loss

Bowl game	Date	Site	Television	Pac-12 team	Opponent	Score	Attendance
Sun Bowl	December 30	Sun Bowl Stadium · El Paso, Texas	CBS	**No. 18 Stanford**	North Carolina	**W** 25–23	42,166
Foster Farms Bowl	December 28	Levi's Stadium · Santa Clara, California	Fox	**No. 19 Utah**	Indiana	**W** 26–24	27,608
Holiday Bowl	December 27	Qualcomm Stadium . San Diego, California	ESPN	Washington State	**Minnesota**	**L** 12–17	48,704
Alamo Bowl	December 29	Alamodome · San Antonio, Texas	ESPN	No. 10 Colorado	**No. 12 Oklahoma State**	**L** 8–38	59,815
**New Year's Six Bowls**
Rose Bowl (New Year Six)	January 2	Rose Bowl · Pasadena, California	ESPN	**No. 9 USC**	No. 5 Penn State	**W** 52–49	95,128
**College Football Playoff bowl games**
Peach Bowl (CFP Semifinal)	December 31	Georgia Dome • Atlanta	ESPN	No. 4 Washington	**No. 1 Alabama**	**L** 7–24	79,996

* Rankings based on CFP rankings, Pac-12 team is bolded

Selection of teams:

- Bowl eligible: Colorado, Stanford, USC, Utah, Washington, Washington State
- Bowl-ineligible: Arizona, Arizona State, California, Oregon, Oregon State, UCLA

=== All-Pac-12 Individual Awards ===
The following individuals won the conference's annual player and coach awards:

**2016 Pac-12 Men's Football Individual Awards**
Award	Recipient(s)
Offensive Player of The Year	Jake Browning, Washington
Coach of the Year	Mike MacIntyre, Colorado
Defensive Player of The Year	Adoree' Jackson, USC
Offensive Freshman of The Year	Sam Darnold, USC
Defensive Freshman of The Year	Taylor Rapp, Washington

=== All-Conference teams ===
The following players earned All-Pac-12 honors.

Offense:

First Team				Second Team		
Pos.	Name	Yr.	School	Name	Yr.	School
QB	Jake Browning	So.	Washington	Luke Falk	Jr.	Washington State
RB	Myles Gaskin	So	Washington	Ronald Jones II	So.	USC
RB	Christian McCaffrey	Jr.	Stanford	Phillip Lindsay	Jr.	Colorado
WR	Gabe Marks	Sr.	Washington State	Chad Hansen	Jr.	California
WR	John Ross	Jr.	Washington	JuJu Smith-Schuster	Jr.	USC
TE	Pharaoh Brown	Sr.	Oregon	Nate Iese	Sr.	UCLA
OL	Trey Adams	So.	Washington	Isaac Asiata	Sr.	Utah
OL	Zach Banner	Sr.	USC	Sean Harlow	Sr.	Oregon State
OL	Garett Bolles	Jr.	Utah	Jeromy Irwin	Jr.	Colorado
OL	Jake Eldrenkamp	Sr.	Washington	Damien Mama	Jr.	USC
OL	Scott Quessenberry	Jr.	UCLA	Conor McDermott	Jr.	UCLA
OL	Chad Wheeler	Sr.	USC	Coleman Shelton	Jr.	Washington

Defense:

First Team				Second Team		
Pos.	Name	Yr.	School	Name	Yr.	School
DL	Hunter Dimick	Sr.	Utah	Hercules Mata'afa	So.	Washington State
DL	Takkarist McKinley	Sr.	UCLA	Stevie Tu'ikolovatu	Sr.	USC
DL	Elijah Qualls	Jr.	Washington	Vita Vea	So.	Washington
DL	Solomon Thomas	Jr.	Stanford	JoJo Wicker	So.	Arizona State
LB	Jayon Brown	Sr.	UCLA	Keishawn Bierria	Jr.	Washington
LB	Jimmie Gilbert	Sr.	Colorado	Koron Crump	Jr.	Arizona State
LB	Azeem Victor	Jr.	Washington	Cameron Smith	So.	USC
LB				Kenny Young	Jr.	UCLA
DB	Budda Baker	Jr.	Washington	Chidobe Awuzie	Sr.	Colorado
DB	Adoree' Jackson	Jr.	USC	Tedric Thompson	Sr.	Colorado
DB	Sidney Jones	Jr.	Washington	Marcus Williams	Jr.	Utah
DB	Shalom Luani	Sr.	Washington State	Ahkello Witherspoon	Sr.	Colorado

Specialists:

First Team				Second Team		
Pos.	Name	Yr.	School	Name	Yr.	School
PK	Zane Gonzalez	Sr.	Arizona State	Andy Phillips	Sr.	Utah
P	Mitch Wishnowsky	So.	Utah	Matt Haack	Sr.	ASU
RS	Adoree' Jackson	Jr.	USC	Dante Pettis	Jr.	Washington
ST	Ryan Moeller	Jr.	Colorado	(AP/ST) Tony Brooks-James	So.	Oregon

Honorable Mentions

- ARIZONA: AP/ST Samajie Grant Sr.; WR Nate Phillips Sr.; WR Trey Griffey, Sr.
- ARIZONA STATE: WR N'Keal Harry, Fr.; LB Viliami (Laiu) Moeakiola Sr.
- CALIFORNIA: PK Matt Anderson Jr.; DL James Looney, Jr.; OL Steven Moore Sr.; RB Khalfani Muhammad, Sr.; QB Davis Webb, Sr.
- COLORADO: WR Bryce Bobo Jr.; DL, Jordan Carrell, Sr.; WR Shay Fields, Jr.; OL Alex Kelley Sr.; OL Gerrad Kough Jr.; QB Sefo Liufau, Sr.; LB Kenneth Olugbode Sr.; WR Devin Ross Jr.; DL Josh Tupou Sr.
- OREGON: LB Troy Dye, Fr.; RB Royce Freeman, Jr.; OL Jake Hanson, Fr.; TE Johnny Mundt Sr.; RS Charles Nelson Jr.; OL Calvin Throckmorton, Fr.; K Matt Wogan Sr.
- OREGON STATE: DB Xavier Crawford, Fr.; DB Treston Decoud, Sr.; OL Gus Lavaka Fr.; RB Ryan Nall, So.
- STANFORD: LB Joey Alfieri Jr.; P Jake Bailey, So.; DB Dallas Lloyd Sr.; RB Bryce Love, So.; RS Christian McCaffrey, Jr.; DB Quenton Meeks, So.; LB Kevin Palma Sr.; Harrison Phillips, Jr.; DB Justin Reid, So.; TE Dalton Schultz, Jr.; ST Brandon Simmons Jr.; PK Conrad Ukropina Sr.
- UCLA: WR Darren Andrews Jr.; DB Randall Goforth, Sr.; Fabian Moreau, Sr.; DL Eddie Vanderdoes, Jr.; DB Jaleel Wadood Jr.
- USC: QB Sam Darnold, RSFr.; DL Rasheem Green, So.; DL Porter Gustin, So.; DB Chris Hawkins Jr.; LB Michael Hutchings Sr.; TE Daniel Imatorbhebhe, RSFr.; DB Iman Marshall, So.; Leon McQuay III, Sr.; WR Darreus Rogers Sr.
- UTAH: DB Chase Hansen, So.; DL Lowell Lotulelei Jr.; DL Filipo Mokofisi Jr.; DL Pasoni Tasini Sr.; DL Pita Taumoepenu, Sr.; RB Joe Williams, Sr.
- WASHINGTON: TE Darrell Daniels Sr.; DL Greg Gaines, So.; DB Kevin King, Sr.; TE Drew Sample, So.; LB Psalm Wooching, Sr.
- WASHINGTON STATE: WR River Cracraft, Sr.; OL Cole Madison, Jr.; RB Jamal Morrow Jr.; OL Cody O'Connell, Jr.; LB Peyton Pelluer Jr.; OL Riley Sorenson Sr.

=== All-Americans ===
The following Pac-12 players were named to the 2016 College Football All-America Team by the Walter Camp Football Foundation (WCFF), Associated Press (AP), Football Writers Association of america (FWAA), Sporting News (SN), and American Football Coaches Association (AFCA):

Position	Player	School	Selector	Unanimous	Consensus
**First Team All-Americans**

Position	Player	School	Selector	Unanimous	Consensus
**Second Team All-Americans**
WR	John Ross	Washington	AP, FWAA		

Position	Player	School	Selector	Unanimous	Consensus
**Third Team All-Americans**

Academic All-America Team Member of the Year (CoSIDA)

=== All-Academic ===
First team

Pos.	Name	School	Yr.	GPA	Major

== Home game attendance ==
Team	Stadium	Capacity	Game 1	Game 2	Game 3	Game 4	Game 5	Game 6	Game 7	Total	Average	% of Capacity
Arizona	Arizona Stadium	56,029	45,686	50,116	48,747	55,463†	46,740	41,068	50,197	338,017	48,288	86.18%
Arizona State	Sun Devil Stadium	56,232	45,300	44,511	49,295	48,509	50,582†	48,220	—	286,417	47,736	84.89%
California	California Memorial Stadium	62,467	50,448	46,618	43,048	47,756	52,266†	39,633	—	279,769	46,628	74.64%
Colorado	Folsom Field	50,183	39,505	46,839	48,588	43,761	48,658	**52,301**†	—	279,652	46,609	92.88%
Oregon	Autzen Stadium	54,000	53,817	53,774	53,974	**58,842**†	53,898	53,757	—	328,062	54,677	101.25%
Oregon State	Reser Stadium	45,674	38,052	42,846	34,066	32,093	37,081	35,059	44,160†	263,357	37,622	82.37%
Stanford	Stanford Stadium	50,424	46,147	48,763	50,424†	44,535	38,813	36,171	—	265,033	44,172	87.60%
UCLA	Rose Bowl	92,542	63,712	70,833	68,013	66,243	64,813	71,137†	—	404,751	67,458	72.89%
USC	Los Angeles Memorial Coliseum	93,607	62,487	71,214	68,302	61,725	74,625†	72,402	—	338,353	67,670	72.29%
Utah	Rice-Eccles Stadium	45,807	**45,945**	**46,915**	**46,133**	**45,917**	**47,801**†	**46,327**	—	279,038	46,506	101.53%
Washington	Husky Stadium	70,083	58,640	60,678	57,151	**72,027**	65,796	**72,362**†	65,467	452,121	64,588	92.16%
Washington State	Martin Stadium	32,952	32,952	28,477	32,952	29,310	**33,547**	30,135	**33,773**†	187,373	31,228	94.77%

Bold – Exceed capacity
†Season High

Attendance for neutral site games:

- August 26 – Cal vs. Hawaii, 61,247
- September 2 – Colorado vs. Colorado State, 69,850
- September 3 – Arizona vs. BYU, 50,528
- September 3 – USC vs Alabama, 81,359
- December 2 – Colorado vs Washington, 47,118
