= 2016 Minnesota Golden Gophers football team =

American college football season

2016 Minnesota Golden Gophers football

Holiday Bowl champion

Holiday Bowl, W 17–12 vs. Washington State
- Conference: Big Ten Conference
- West Division
- Record: 9–4 (5–4 Big Ten)
- Head coach: Tracy Claeys (1st season)
- Offensive coordinator: Jay Johnson (1st season)
- Offensive scheme: Multiple
- Defensive coordinator: Jay Sawvel (1st season)
- Base defense: 4–3
- Captains: Mitch Leidner; Brandon Lingen; Jack Lynn; Damarius Travis
- Home stadium: TCF Bank Stadium

2016 Big Ten Conference football standings
	Conf.			Overall
Team	W		L	W		L
East Division
No. 7 Penn State xy$	8	–	1	11	–	3
No. 6 Ohio State x^	8	–	1	11	–	2
No. 10 Michigan	7	–	2	10	–	3
Indiana	4	–	5	6	–	7
Maryland	3	–	6	6	–	7
Michigan State	1	–	8	3	–	9
Rutgers	0	–	9	2	–	10
West Division
No. 9 Wisconsin xy	7	–	2	11	–	3
Iowa	6	–	3	8	–	5
Nebraska	6	–	3	9	–	4
Minnesota	5	–	4	9	–	4
Northwestern	5	–	4	7	–	6
Illinois	2	–	7	3	–	9
Purdue	1	–	8	3	–	9
Championship: Penn State 38, Wisconsin 31
^ – College Football Playoff participant; $ – Conference champion; x – Division champion/co-champions; y – Championship game participant; Rankings from AP Poll

The 2016 Minnesota Golden Gophers football team represented the University of Minnesota in the 2016 NCAA Division I FBS football season. They played home games at TCF Bank Stadium. They were a member of the West Division of the Big Ten Conference. They finished the season 9–4, 5–4 in conference play to finish in fourth place in the West Division. They were invited to the Holiday Bowl where they defeated Washington State.

The Golden Gophers were led by Tracy Claeys in his first and only season as head coach. Claeys was fired by the university on January 3 after he publicy backed a player-led boycott of the Holiday Bowl, following the suspension of ten players that were accused of sexual assault.

== Schedule ==
Minnesota faced all six West Division opponents: Illinois, Iowa, Nebraska, Northwestern, Purdue, and Wisconsin. The Gophers also faced East Division opponents Maryland, Penn State, and Rutgers. Minnesota played three non-conference games: Oregon State of the Pac-12 Conference, Indiana State of the Missouri Valley Football Conference, and Colorado State of the Mountain West Conference. Minnesota had one bye week during the season between their games against Indiana State and Colorado State.

Date	Time	Opponent	Site	TV	Result	Attendance
September 1	8:00 pm	Oregon State*	TCF Bank Stadium; Minneapolis, MN	BTN	W 30–23	44,582
September 10	11:00 am	Indiana State*	TCF Bank Stadium; Minneapolis, MN	ESPNews	W 58–28	41,026
September 24	11:00 am	Colorado State*	TCF Bank Stadium; Minneapolis, MN	ESPNU	W 31–24	44,854
October 1	2:30 pm	at Penn State	Beaver Stadium; University Park, PA (Governor's Victory Bell)	BTN	L 26–29 ^{OT}	95,332
October 8	11:00 am	Iowa	TCF Bank Stadium; Minneapolis, MN (rivalry)	ESPN2	L 7–14	49,145
October 15	11:00 am	at Maryland	Maryland Stadium; College Park, MD	ESPNU	W 31–10	41,465
October 22	11:00 am	Rutgers^{†}	TCF Bank Stadium; Minneapolis, MN	ESPNU	W 34–32	46,096
October 29	11:00 am	at Illinois	Memorial Stadium; Champaign, IL	BTN	W 40–17	40,090
November 5	2:30 pm	Purdue	TCF Bank Stadium; Minneapolis, MN	BTN	W 44–31	42,832
November 12	6:30 pm	at No. 21 Nebraska	Memorial Stadium; Lincoln, NE (rivalry)	BTN	L 17–24	90,456
November 19	2:30 pm	Northwestern	TCF Bank Stadium; Minneapolis, MN	BTN	W 29–12	38,162
November 26	2:30 pm	at No. 5 Wisconsin	Camp Randall Stadium; Madison, WI (rivalry)	BTN	L 17–31	77,216
December 27	6:00 pm	vs. Washington State*	Qualcomm Stadium; San Diego, CA (Holiday Bowl)	ESPN	W 17–12	48,704
*Non-conference game; ^{†}Homecoming; Rankings from AP Poll released prior to the game; All times are in Central time

== Game summaries ==
=== Oregon State ===
	1	2	3	4	Total
Beavers	7	7	9	0	23
Golden Gophers	0	17	0	13	30

=== Indiana State ===
	1	2	3	4	Total
Sycamores	7	0	14	7	28
Golden Gophers	14	24	10	10	58

=== Colorado State ===
	1	2	3	4	Total
Rams	7	0	10	7	24
Golden Gophers	7	10	7	7	31

=== At Penn State ===
	1	2	3	4	OT	Total
Golden Gophers	3	10	0	10	3	26
Nittany Lions	0	3	17	3	6	29

=== Iowa ===
	1	2	3	4	Total
Hawkeyes	0	3	3	8	14
Golden Gophers	0	0	7	0	7

=== At Maryland ===
	1	2	3	4	Total
Golden Gophers	0	14	3	14	31
Terrapins	0	0	0	10	10

=== Rutgers ===
	1	2	3	4	Total
Scarlet Knights	3	7	13	9	32
Golden Gophers	21	0	10	3	34

=== At Illinois ===
	1	2	3	4	Total
Golden Gophers	14	0	7	19	40
Fighting Illini	7	0	7	3	17

=== Purdue ===
	1	2	3	4	Total
Boilermakers	14	14	0	3	31
Golden Gophers	10	13	7	14	44

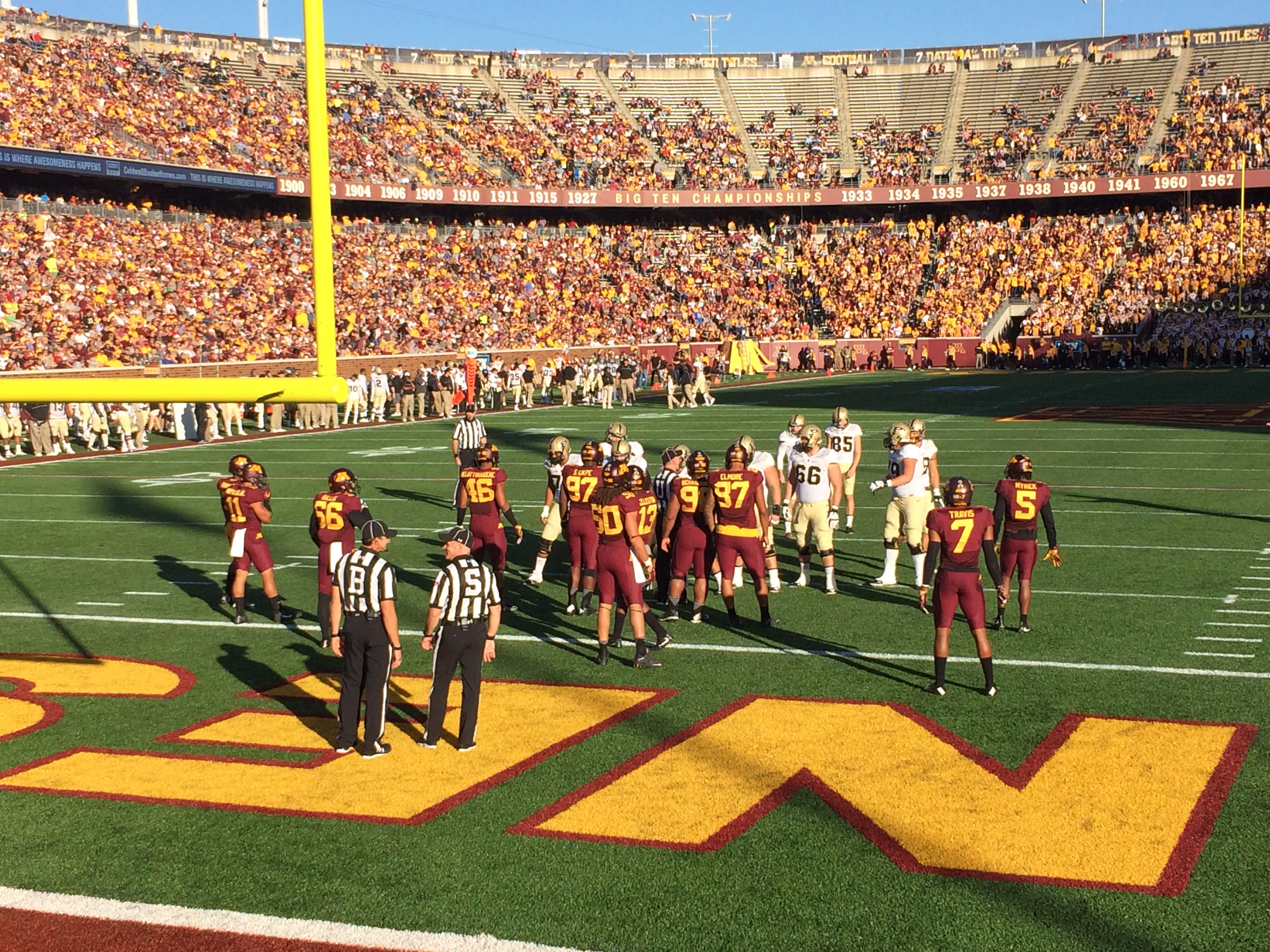
Purdue at Minnesota

=== At #21 Nebraska ===
	1	2	3	4	Total
Golden Gophers	7	10	0	0	17
#21 Cornhuskers	3	7	7	7	24

=== Northwestern ===
	1	2	3	4	Total
Wildcats	0	0	6	6	12
Golden Gophers	6	6	3	14	29

=== At #6 Wisconsin ===
	1	2	3	4	Total
Golden Gophers	3	14	0	0	17
#6 Badgers	0	7	3	21	31

=== Washington State–Holiday Bowl ===
	1	2	3	4	Total
Golden Gophers	0	3	7	7	17
Cougars	3	3	0	6	12

== Personnel ==
=== Coaching staff ===
Name	Position	Alma mater	Joined Staff
Tracy Claeys	Head coach	Kansas State (1994)	2010
Brian Anderson	Wide receivers coach	Illinois (1994)	2010
Jay Johnson	Offensive coordinator / quarterbacks coach	Northern Iowa (1993)	2015
Bart Miller	Offensive line coach	New Mexico (2007)	2015
Jeff Phelps	Defensive line coach	Ball State (1997)	2010
Pat Poore	Running backs coach / co-special team coordinator	Fort Hays State (1984)	2010
Rob Reeves	H-backs coach / tight ends coach	Saginaw Valley State (1996)	2010
Jay Sawvel	Defensive coordinator	Mount Union (1993)	2010
Mike Sherels	Linebackers coach	Minnesota (2007)	2013
Dan O'Brien	Assistant Defensive Backs / co-special team coordinator / assistant head coach	St. Thomas (1987)	2010
Eric Klein	Strength and conditioning	Carleton College (1993)	2010

=== Roster ===
2016 Minnesota Golden Gophers football team roster
Players
Coaches
Offense

Pos.	#	Name	Class
RB	1	Rodney Smith	So
WR	2	Isaiah Gentry	So
WR	5	Melvin Holland	So
WR	6	Tyler Johnson	Fr
QB	7	Mitch Leidner (C)	Sr
QB	8	Mark Williams	Fr
WR	9	Eric Carter	Jr
QB	11	Demry Croft	So
WR	12	Hunter Register	Fr
QB	15	Conor Rhoda	Jr
QB	17	Seth Green	Fr
WR	18	Clay Geary	Fr
WR	19	Michael Conway	Jr
WR	20	Adam Mayer	Fr
RB	22	Kobe McCrary	Fr
RB	23	Shannon Brooks	So
WR	24	Drew Hmielewski	Fr
WR	25	Phillip Howard	Fr
WR	26	Brian Smith	Jr
RB	27	James Johannesson	Fr
RB	28	Jonathan Femi-Cole	Fr
RB	29	Carlton Djam	So
FB	40	Connor Mohs	Fr
TE	42	Ko Kieft	Fr
TE	44	Colton Beebe	Fr
TE	45	Nick Hart	Jr
TE	49	Bryce Witham	Fr
OL	53	Luke Rasmussen	So
OL	55	Connor Mayes	Jr
OL	58	Quinn Oseland	Fr
OL	60	Matt Leidner	Jr
OL	61	Bronson Dovich	Fr
OL	62	Jared Weyler	So
OL	64	Conner Olson	Fr
OL	66	Ted Stieber	Fr
OL	70	Chad Fahning	Jr
OL	71	Sam Schlueter	Fr
OL	73	Donnell Greene	So
OL	74	Nick Connelly	Fr
OL	75	Noah Kuehn	Fr
OL	76	Vincent Calhoun	Jr
OL	77	Tyler Moore	So
OL	78	Garrison Wright	Jr
OL	79	Jonah Pirsig	Sr
TE	80	Nate Wozniak	Jr
TE	81	Duke Anyanwu	Jr
WR	82	Drew Wolitarsky	Sr
TE	83	Danny Pietruszewski	Fr
WR	84	Will Reger	So
TE	85	Bryce Witham	Fr
TE	86	Brandon Lingen (C)	Jr
WR	88	Rashad Still	So
WR	89	Matt Morse	Fr

Defense

Pos.	#	Name	Class
DB	2	Dior Johnson	Fr
DB	3	KiAnte Hardin	So
DB	4	Adekunle Ayinde	Jr
DB	5	Jalen Myrick	Sr
DB	6	Ace Rogers	Sr
DB	7	Damarius Travis (C)	Sr
DB	8	Duke McGhee	Jr
DL	9	Jerry Gibson	So
DB	11	Antoine Winfield Jr.	Fr
LB	12	Cody Poock	Jr
LB	13	Jonathan Celestin	Jr
DB	14	Zo Craighton	Fr
LB	15	Everett Williams	Jr
CB	16	Coney Durr	Fr
DB	17	Jacob Huff	So
DL	19	Gary Moore	So
DB	20	Julian Huff	So
DB	21	Ray Buford	Fr
DB	22	Joey Gorgen	Fr
DB	24	Troy Dipre	Fr
DB	26	Calvin Swenson	Fr
DB	30	Eric Amoako	Sr
DB	31	Kiondre Thomas	Fr
DL	33	Tamarion Johnson	Fr
DB	34	Antonio Shenault	So
LB	35	Jaylen Waters	Fr
DB	36	Blake Cashman	So
DB	40	Alexander Starks	Sr
LB	41	Thomas Barber	Fr
LB	43	Bailey Schoenfelder	Fr
LB	44	Kamal Martin	Fr
LB	45	Carter Coughlin	Fr
LB	48	Blake Weber	Jr
LB	50	Jack Lynn (C)	Sr
DL	52	Yoshoub Timms	Sr
LB	56	Nick Rallis	Sr
LB	59	Ray Dixon	Jr
DL	87	Gaelin Elmore	Jr
DL	88	Winston DeLattiboudere	Fr
DL	90	Sam Renner	Fr
DE	91	Julien Kafo	So
DL	92	Tai'yon Devers	Fr
DL	93	Merrick Jackson	Jr
DL	95	Hendrick Ekpe	Sr
DL	96	Steven Richardson	Jr
DL	97	Scott Ekpe	Sr
DE	99	Andrew Stelter	Jr

Special teams

Pos.	#	Name	Class
K, P	18	Ryan Santoso	Jr
LS	25	Payton Jordahl	So
K	33	Andrew Harte	Jr
P	34	Logan McElfresh	So
K	37	John Mack	Fr
K	38	Emmit Carpenter	So
LS	39	Trey Hansen	Fr
K	42	Justin Juenemann	Jr
P	47	Jacob Herbers	Fr

Head coach

- Tracy Claeys (head coach)

Coordinators/assistant coaches

- Brian Anderson (wide receivers)
- Jay Johnson (offensive coordinator / quarterbacks)
- Bart Miller (offensive Line)
- Dan O'Brien (asst. Defensive Backs / co-special teams coordinator / asst. to the head coach)
- Jeff Phelps (defensive line)
- Pat Poore (running backs / co-special teams coordinator)
- Rob Reeves (H-backs / tight ends)
- Jay Sawvel (defensive coordinator)
- Mike Sherels (linebackers)

Legend

- (C) Team captain
- (S) Suspended
- (I) Ineligible
- Injured
- Redshirt

Roster
Last update: August 17, 2016

== Awards and honors ==
Weekly Awards
Player	Award	Date Awarded	Ref.
Emmit Carpenter	Big Ten Special Teams Player of the Week	October 3, 2016	
Rodney Smith	Big Ten Offensive Player of the Week	October 24, 2016	
Emmit Carpenter	Big Ten Special Teams Player of the Week	November 7, 2016	
Blake Cashman	Big Ten Defensive Player of the Week	November 21, 2016	

== Players drafted into the NFL ==
Round	Pick	Player	Position	NFL Club
7	222	Jalen Myrick	CB	Jacksonville Jaguars
