= 2016 Holiday Bowl =

2016 National Funding Holiday Bowl
- 39th Holiday Bowl
Minnesota Golden Gophers	Washington State Cougars
(8–4)	(8–4)
Big Ten	Pac-12
17	12
Head coach: Tracy Claeys	Head coach: Mike Leach
	1	2	3	4	Total
Minnesota	0	3	7	7	17
Washington State	3	3	0	6	12
- Date: December 27, 2016
- Season: 2016
- Stadium: Qualcomm Stadium
- Location: San Diego, California
- MVP: Offense: Minnesota RB Rodney Smith; Defense: Minnesota LB Blake Cashman
- Favorite: Washington State by 10
- Referee: Gary Patterson (ACC)
- Attendance: 48,704
- Payout: US$5.93 million (total for both teams)

United States TV coverage
- Network: ESPN/ESPN Radio, ESPN Deportes
- Announcers: Bob Wischusen, Brock Huard, Allison Williams

The 2016 Holiday Bowl was a postseason college football bowl game, played at Qualcomm Stadium in San Diego, California, on December 27, 2016. This was the last time the Holiday Bowl was played at Qualcomm Stadium. The game was played at SDCCU Stadium, the home of the San Diego State Aztecs. The 39th edition of the Holiday Bowl featured the Minnesota Golden Gophers of the Big Ten Conference versus the Washington State Cougars of the Pac-12 Conference. Sponsored by small business loan company National Funding, the game is officially known as the National Funding Holiday Bowl.

== Teams ==
=== Minnesota ===
This was Minnesota's first appearance in the Holiday Bowl. On December 15, Minnesota players threatened to boycott all football activity, including participation in the 2016 Holiday Bowl, in protest against a decision to suspend ten players from the team. The suspension was made as a result of school investigation into sexual assault charges from the beginning of school year. The legal process had already run its course, with no charges filed. On December 17, the Golden Gophers ended their boycott and announced they would play.

=== Washington State ===
This was Washington State's third appearance in the Holiday Bowl, having lost to #14 Brigham Young in 1981, and having defeated #5 Texas in 2003.

== Game summary ==
=== Scoring summary ===
Scoring summary

Quarter	Time	Drive			Team	Scoring information	Score	
Quarter	Time	Plays	Yards	TOP	Team	Scoring information	MINN	WSU
1	6:23	17	76	6:33	WSU	26-yard field goal by Erik Powell	0	3
2	7:26	6	14	2:53	MINN	43-yard field goal by Emmit Carpenter	3	3
2	0:33	7	14	1:56	WSU	41-yard field goal by Erik Powell	3	6
3	3:23	10	84	5:22	MINN	Shannon Brooks 13-yard touchdown reception from Mitch Leidner, Emmit Carpenter kick good	10	6
4	2:06	4	31	0:59	MINN	Rodney Smith 9-yard touchdown run, Emmit Carpenter kick good	17	6
4	0:19	10	79	1:42	WSU	Kyle Sweet 8-yard touchdown reception from Luke Falk, 2-point pass (Falk–Lewis) failed	17	12
"TOP" = time of possession. For other American football terms, see Glossary of American football.							17	12

=== Statistics ===
Statistics	MINN	WSU
First downs	17	16
Plays-yards	61-279	74-303
Third down efficiency	3-12	7-19
Rushes-yards	41-150	23-39
Passing yards	129	264
Passing, Comp-Att-Int	11-20-0	30-51-1
Time of Possession	28:54	31:06

Team	Category	Player	Statistics
MINN	Passing	Mitch Leidner	11/20, 129 yds, 1 TD
MINN	Rushing	Rodney Smith	17 car, 74 yds, 1 TD
MINN	Receiving	Drew Wolitarsky	5 rec, 73 yds
WSU	Passing	Luke Falk	30/51, 264 yds, 1 TD, 1 INT
WSU	Rushing	Gerard Wicks	5 car, 26 yds
WSU	Receiving	Robert Lewis	6 rec, 86 yds
