= Jack Lynn =

Jack Lynn may refer to:

- Jack Lynn (architect), British architect
- Jack Lynn (American football), American football linebacker
- Jack Lynn (soccer), American soccer player
- Elwyn Lynn, known as Jack, Australian artist
