= Tracy Claeys =

American football coach (born 1968)

Biographical details
- Born: December 25, 1968 (age 57); Clay Center, Kansas, U.S.
- Education: Kansas State University

Coaching career (HC unless noted)
- 1994: Santa Fe Trail HS (KS) (co-DC)
- 1995–1998: Saginaw Valley State (DL)
- 1999–2000: Emporia State (DC)
- 2001–2007: Southern Illinois (DC)
- 2008–2010: Northern Illinois (DC)
- 2011–2013: Minnesota (DC)
- 2014–2015: Minnesota (AHC/DC)
- 2015: Minnesota (interim HC)
- 2016: Minnesota
- 2018–2019: Washington State (DC)
- 2020: Virginia Tech (LB)

Head coaching record
- Overall: 11–8
- Bowls: 2–0

Tracy Lee Claeys (born December 25, 1968) is an American former football coach. Claeys served as the head football coach at University of Minnesota from midway into the 2015 season through the end of the 2016 season. He was an assistant coach under Jerry Kill for 21 years at Saginaw Valley State University, Emporia State University, Southern Illinois University Carbondale, Northern Illinois University, and Minnesota—the last 16 as his defensive coordinator. Claeys was the defensive coordinator at Washington State University from 2018 to 2019 and the linebackers coach at Virginia Tech in 2020. He announced his retirement in January 2021.

== Early life, education, and high school coaching ==
Claeys was born and raised in Clay Center, Kansas, where he began playing football in junior high school at Clay Center Community High School.

Claeys got his start in coaching at the University of Kansas and served as a student trainer, and later as an unpaid assistant coach for head coach Glen Mason. After three years at Kansas, he transferred to Kansas State University and took a job as an assistant at his old high school, earning a salary of $1. After graduating with a degree in Mathematics Education in 1994 from Kansas State, he was hired at Santa Fe Trail High School as a math teacher and co-defensive coordinator of the football team.

== College coaching career ==
In 1995, Claeys was hired as the defensive line coach at Saginaw Valley State under head coach Jerry Kill. When Kill took the head coaching job at Emporia State in 1999, Claeys followed and was promoted to defensive coordinator. He continued to serve as defensive coordinator at Kill's future head coaching stops at Southern Illinois, Northern Illinois, and Minnesota.

Southern Illinois led the nation in defensive scoring in 2004, while allowing only 13.2 points per game, giving up only 101.7 rushing yards per game, and snagging 17 interceptions. In 2007, they reached the FCS national semifinal; their defense ranked as the 10th-best FCS scoring defense in the country, and the second-best scoring defense at SIU since 1983. They intercepted 21 passes, which ranked fourth in the nation.

In his first season at Northern Illinois, Claeys and the defensive staff coached the Huskies into leading the MAC in pass defense, scoring defense, and total defense. They also finished in the top 20 nationally in those three categories: fifth in pass defense, 14th in scoring defense, and 17th in total defense. Claeys' defense topped the MAC and ranked 30th in the country in total defense the following year, and were also among the top 30 FBS teams in scoring defense that season. In 2010, Claeys led a Northern Illinois defensive unit that was ranked No. 14 in the nation and No. 1 in the MAC in scoring defense, allowing an average of just 19 points per game. The Huskies were also 32nd in the nation in pass efficiency defense, 27th in total defense, and 27th in rushing defense.

Claeys joined the Minnesota staff on December 10, 2010, when Kill hired him as defensive coordinator. He was nominated for the Frank Broyles Award (top college assistant coach) in 2013 and 2014 and was promoted to Associate Head Coach prior to the 2014 season.

He transformed the Gopher defense into one of the best in the Big Ten. Minnesota allowed 380 points in 2011 and 321 points in 2012. By comparison, in 2013, the Gopher defense allowed only 289 points, which marked the first time that Minnesota allowed fewer than 300 points in a full season since 2004. He also coached four First Team All-Big Ten defensive selections—Briean Boddy-Calhoun (2014), Damien Wilson (2014), Ra'Shede Hageman (2013), and Brock Vereen (2013)—at Minnesota in five years. In contrast, Minnesota had five First Team All-Big Ten defensive selections from 2000 to 2010.

=== Head coach at Minnesota ===
Due to Jerry Kill's health problems throughout his career, Claeys filled in as acting head coach when Kill was unable to coach. This first occurred in 2005, when Kill suffered a seizure on the sideline during a Southern Illinois game; Kill was later diagnosed with kidney cancer and epilepsy. Claeys filled in for Kill when Kill missed parts of three games in his first three years at Minnesota, and for the entire game when Kill had a seizure before a game at Michigan in 2013. On October 10, 2013, it was announced that Kill would take an open-ended leave of absence from coaching to focus on treating his epilepsy. Claeys was appointed acting head coach until Kill's return. The Gophers went 4–3 under Claeys during the regular season, a stretch that included a four-game Big Ten conference win streak (the Gophers' first since 1973). They lost their bowl game to Syracuse, in which Coach Kill returned to the sidelines in the second half.

Kill retired for health reasons on October 28, 2015, and Claeys was named interim head coach for the remainder of the season. On November 11, 2015, Minnesota dropped the "interim" tag from Claeys' title and formally named him as its 29th head coach. On January 3, 2017, he was fired after public outrage over a team-led boycott in response to suspensions of 10 Minnesota football players accused of having a role in a sexual assault case. Claeys was on-record stating he "supports [his] players’ 1st amendment rights!"

=== Washington State ===
Claeys was hired by Mike Leach on January 8, 2018, to be the defensive coordinator at Washington State after Alex Grinch accepted a position at Ohio State. The Cougars ended the 2018 season with the fourth-ranked defense and led the Pac-12 Conference in sacks with 38. He resigned on October 4, 2019; at the time, Washington State's defense was ranked 107th in the nation and was allowing over 30 points per game. This came after the Cougars blew a 49–17 lead at home to the UCLA, losing 67–63 in a game in which Cougars quarterback Anthony Gordon threw for a record nine touchdowns.

=== Virginia Tech ===
Claeys joined the Virginia Tech staff as linebackers coach before the 2020 season. The team finished 5 - 6 and did not qualify for a bowl game, breaking a streak of 27 years of consecutive bowl game appearances. Claeys retired at the end of the season.

== Head coaching record ==
Year	Team	Overall	Conference	Standing	Bowl/playoffs
Minnesota Golden Gophers (Big Ten Conference) (2015–2016)
2015	Minnesota	2–4 (Note: Jerry Kill was head coach for the first seven games of the season. Claeys was named interim head coach after Kill retired for health reasons on October 28, and had the "interim" tag removed on November 15. Minnesota credits the first seven games to Kill and the final five games to Claeys.)	1–4	T–5th (West)	W Quick Lane
2016	Minnesota	9–4	5–4	T–4th (West)	W Holiday
Minnesota:		11–8	6–8		
Total:		11–8			
