= 2002 Tangerine Bowl =

American college football game

2002 Mazda Tangerine Bowl
| Texas Tech Red Raiders | Clemson Tigers |
| (8–5) | (7–5) |
| Big 12 | ACC |
| 55 | 15 |
| Head coach: Mike Leach | Head coach: Tommy Bowden |
| | 1 | 2 | 3 | 4 | Total |
|---|---|---|---|---|---|
| Texas Tech | 17 | 17 | 7 | 14 | 55 |
| Clemson | 0 | 2 | 7 | 6 | 15 |
- Date: December 23, 2002
- Season: 2002
- Stadium: Florida Citrus Bowl
- Location: Orlando, Florida
- MVP: QB Kliff Kingsbury (Texas Tech)
- Favorite: Texas Tech by 4.5
- Referee: Bill Alge (MAC)
- Attendance: 21,689

United States TV coverage
- Network: ESPN
- Announcers: Mike Tirico (play-by-play), Lee Corso, Kirk Herbstreit (analysts), and Dr. Jerry Punch (sideline)

The 2002 Tangerine Bowl was the 13th edition of the college football bowl game formerly known as Blockbuster / Carquest / MicronPC Bowl. This was the second under the "Tangerine Bowl" moniker, a reference to the original name of the Citrus Bowl, known as the Tangerine Bowl from 1947 to 1982. It was played on December 23, 2002, and featured the Texas Tech Red Raiders and the Clemson Tigers.

== Background ==
The Red Raiders finished 2nd in the Southern Division to Oklahoma and Texas, having lost to the former in Oklahoma and having beaten the latter at home. They were 2–5 against ranked opponents, having beaten #23 Texas A&M and #4 Texas, but losing to #12 Ohio State, #16 NC State, #11 Iowa State, #21 Colorado and #3 Oklahoma. This was the eighth bowl game for the Red Raiders in nine years. Clemson began their season with a non-conference loss to #8 Georgia 31–28. This was the first of four losses to ranked opponents, while the team finished with one more win in the regular season than the previous year. They finished fourth in the Atlantic Coast Conference behind Florida State, Virginia & Maryland, and NC State, all of whom beat Clemson. This was the ninth bowl game for the Tigers in 10 years.

== Game summary ==
Texas Tech scored first on a 29-yard field goal from Robert Treece, giving Tech a 3–0 lead. Kliff Kingsbury threw a 46-yard touchdown pass to Nehemiah Glover making it 10–0. He threw another 19-yard touchdown pass to Mickey Peters.

In the second quarter, Taurean Henderson scored from 10 yards out, and Tech took a 24–0 lead. After Clemson forced a safety, Wes Welker scored on a 59-yard punt return to make it 31–2, Texas Tech. Robert Treece's 34-yard field goal before halftime made it 34–2 Texas Tech.

In the third quarter, Charlie Whitehurst threw a 10-yard touchdown pass to Ben Hall to make it 34–9. B. J. Symons threw a 2-yard touchdown pass to Carlos Francis to make it 41–9, Texas Tech.

In the fourth quarter, Clemson's Chad Jasmine scored on a 2-yard touchdown run making it 41–15. Kliff Kingsbury threw a 9-yard touchdown pass to Wes Welker making it 48–15. A 26-yard touchdown pass from B. J. Symons to Taurean Henderson ended up being the final score of the game.

- Texas Tech – Treece 29-yard field goal (10:11)
- Texas Tech – Glover 46-yard touchdown pass from Kingsbury (5:38)
- Texas Tech – Peters 19-yard touchdown pass from Kingsbury (1:26)
- Texas Tech – Henderson 10-yard touchdown run (12:09)
- Clemson – Hill safety (5:14)
- Texas Tech – Welker 59-yard touchdown punt return (3:52)
- Texas Tech – Treece 40-yard field goal (0:00)
- Clemson – Hall 10-yard touchdown pass from Whitehurst (11:12)
- Texas Tech – Francis 2-yard touchdown pass from Symons (6:12)
- Clemson – Jasmin 2-yard touchdown run (12:29)
- Texas Tech – Welker 9-yard touchdown pass from Kingsbury (9:18)
- Texas Tech – Henderson 26-yard touchdown pass from Symons (5:32)

Kliff Kingsbury threw 32-of-43 for 375 yards and three touchdowns. This was Texas Tech's first bowl win since 1995.

== Statistics ==
| Statistics | Texas Tech | Clemson |
|---|---|---|
| First downs | 28 | 20 |
| Rushing yards | 91 | 41 |
| Passing yards | 464 | 319 |
| Total offense | 555 | 360 |
| Passing | 39-52-1 | 25–56–4 |
| Punts-Average | 3-29.7 | 6-38.3 |
| Return yards | 140 | 236 |
| Fumbles-Lost | 0-0 | 2–0 |
| Penalties-Yards | 8-79 | 7-55 |

== Aftermath ==
Texas Tech reached six more bowl games in the decade, with victories in four of them, including consecutive bowl wins in separate years, a first for the program. As for Clemson, they also reached six more bowl games in the decade, winning half of them.
