= Mike Leach (American football coach) =

American football coach (1961–2022)

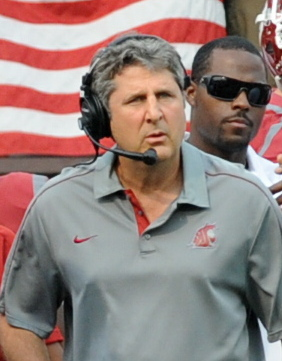
- Leach in 2012

Biographical details
- Born: March 9, 1961; Susanville, California, U.S.
- Died: December 12, 2022 (aged 61); Jackson, Mississippi, U.S.
- Education: Brigham Young University (BA); Pepperdine University (JD); United States Sports Academy (MS)

Playing career

Rugby
- 1979–1983: BYU

Coaching career (HC unless noted)
- 1987: Cal Poly (OL)
- 1988: Desert (LB)
- 1989: Pori Bears
- 1989–1991: Iowa Wesleyan (OC/OL)
- 1992–1993: Valdosta State (OC/WR/QB)
- 1994–1996: Valdosta State (OC/OL)
- 1997–1998: Kentucky (OC/QB)
- 1999: Oklahoma (OC/QB)
- 2000–2009: Texas Tech
- 2012–2019: Washington State
- 2020–2022: Mississippi State

Head coaching record
- Overall: 158–107
- Bowls: 8–9

Accomplishments and honors

Championships
- 1 Big 12 South Division (2008)

Awards
- AFCA Coach of the Year (2018); George Munger Award (2008); Woody Hayes Trophy (2008); 2× Pac-12 Coach of the Year (2015, 2018); Big 12 Coach of the Year (2008)

Michael Charles Leach (March 9, 1961 – December 12, 2022) was an American college football coach who primarily coached at the NCAA Division I FBS level. Nicknamed "the Pirate", he was a two-time national coach of the year, three-time conference coach of the year and the mastermind behind the NCAA record-setting air raid offense. He was the head coach at Texas Tech University from 2000 to 2009, where he became the winningest coach in school history. After Texas Tech, he coached at Washington State University from 2012 to 2019, where he recorded the third-most wins of any coach in school history. He then coached at Mississippi State University from 2020 until his death in 2022.

Leach was known for directing offenses using lots of passing to several receivers, in a spread system known as the air raid, which Leach developed with Hal Mumme when Mumme was head coach and Leach was offensive coordinator at Iowa Wesleyan, Valdosta State, and Kentucky in the 1990s. Leach's offenses with Mumme, and later as a head coach himself, broke numerous school and NCAA records. On eighteen occasions, Leach led his unranked team to victory over a team ranked in the AP poll, which is the most in the AP era.

== Early life and education ==
Mike Leach was born to Frank and Sandra Leach in Susanville, California. His father Frank was a forester and the family moved around several times while Leach was growing up, before finally settling in Cody, Wyoming. Leach was raised a member of the Church of Jesus Christ of Latter-day Saints. While growing up in Cody, he joined Boy Scout Troop 58 and earned the rank of Eagle in 1975. Leach graduated from Cody High School in 1979; he played football there from 1975 to 1978 and was recruited to play at Brigham Young University (BYU) in Provo, Utah. An ankle injury he sustained in high school ruled out playing college football, so he played rugby instead.

Leach stayed close to the football program, occasionally sitting in on film room sessions. Led by head coach LaVell Edwards, offensive coordinator Norm Chow, and quarterbacks Marc Wilson, Jim McMahon, and Steve Young, BYU played with a pass-heavy offense, which was uncommon in college football at that time. Leach graduated in 1983 with a bachelor's degree in American studies.

In 1986, Leach earned a Juris Doctor from Pepperdine University School of Law in Malibu, California. He is also one of the most prominent graduates of the United States Sports Academy in Daphne, Alabama, from which he earned a Master of Sports Science in sports coaching in 1988.

== Coaching career ==
=== Early coaching career ===
Leach began his coaching career as an assistant at Cal Poly in 1987 before moving on to College of the Desert in 1988.

In 1989, he served as head coach of the Pori Bears in the American Football Association of Finland.

Also in 1989, he joined Hal Mumme's staff at Iowa Wesleyan University as offensive coordinator. The pair spent three seasons there before moving to Valdosta State (1992–1996) and then Kentucky (1997–1998). The partnership was known for the development of the air raid offense, which allowed their teams to rank highly in offensive statistics and set numerous records. Kentucky quarterback Tim Couch became a No. 1 overall NFL draft pick.

For the 1999 season, Leach joined the Oklahoma staff under head coach Bob Stoops. Oklahoma's offense, which had ranked 11th in the Big 12 Conference in 1998, improved under Leach to first in the conference in 1999.

=== Texas Tech ===
After one year at Oklahoma, Leach was hired as head coach of the Texas Tech Red Raiders, another Big 12 member.

Under Leach, the Red Raiders' best finishes came with three nine-win seasons in 2002, 2005, and 2007 and an 11-win season in 2008. In 2002, Tech swept its in-state conference rivals Baylor, Texas, and Texas A&M for the first time since 1997 and then defeated Clemson, 55–15, in the Tangerine Bowl. It was the Red Raiders' first postseason win since 1995 when they beat the Air Force Falcons in the Copper Bowl. In 2005, the Red Raiders opened their season with a 6–0 record, their best start since 1998. Leach built a strong passing offense at Tech, where the Red Raiders led the NCAA in passing yardage for four years in a row.

He inserted Kliff Kingsbury at quarterback for three years. Kingsbury broke the NCAA records for completions in a career. Kingsbury was succeeded at the position by B. J. Symons, who produced the most passing yards in a season in NCAA history. Sonny Cumbie followed, leading the Red Raiders to an upset of the then-4th ranked California in the 2004 Holiday Bowl. Cody Hodges succeeded Cumbie, and subsequently led the NCAA in passing. Graham Harrell, the first non-senior starting QB since Kingsbury, struggled early in the 2006 season. However, he showed steady improvement beginning with the game against Iowa State and ended the season with a record-setting comeback victory over the Minnesota Golden Gophers. Harrell also set NCAA records for passes completed in a season and career amongst others.

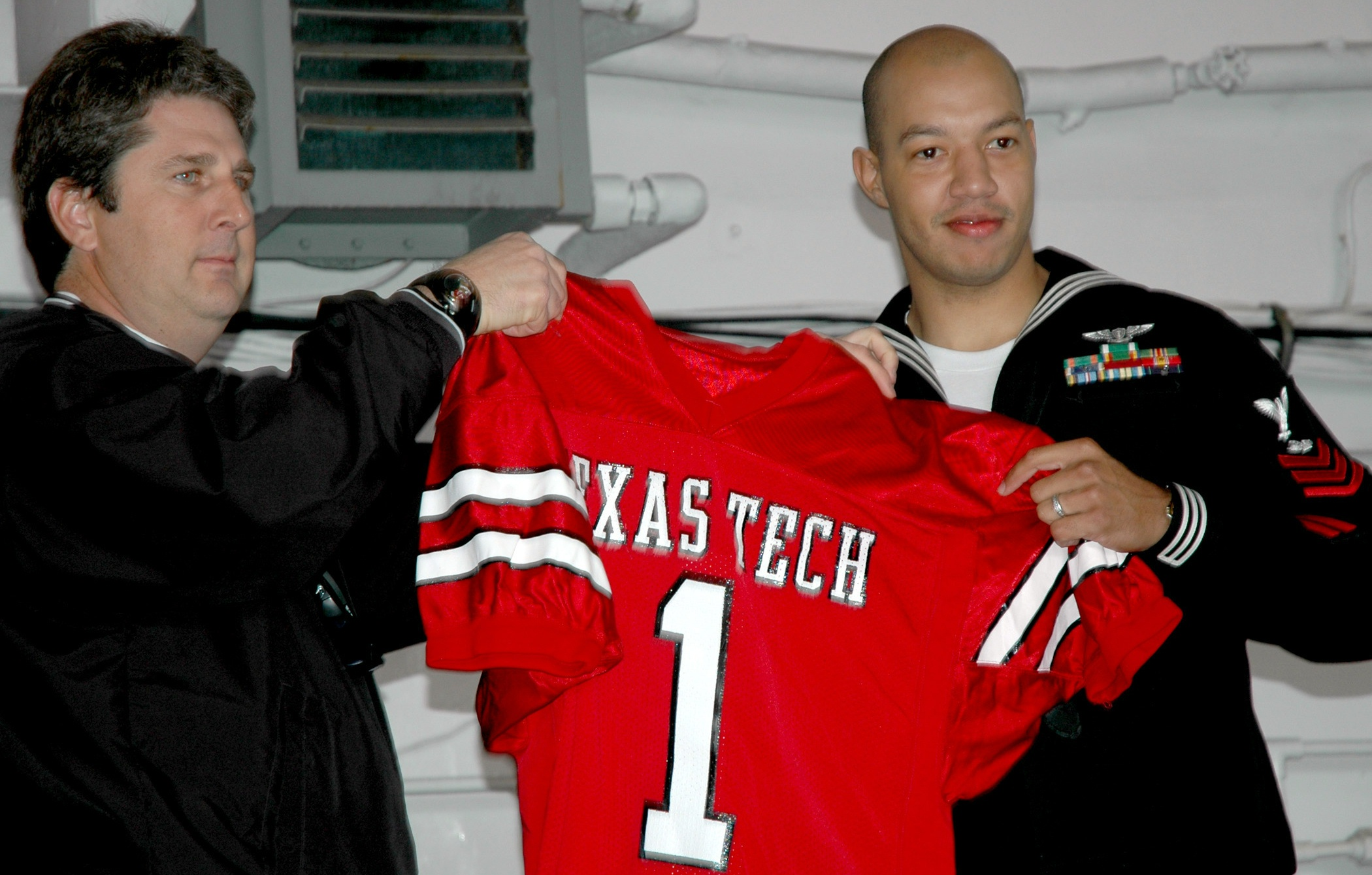
Leach, shown on the left, made a U.S. Navy air traffic controller an honorary team captain for the 2004 Holiday Bowl

Texas Tech was known for its high-scoring offense and come-from-behind victories during Leach's tenure. A 70–35 win over TCU in 2004 began with TCU leading 21–0 with eight minutes remaining in the second quarter. Before Tech's scoring drives started, a TCU defensive back was caught mouthing into a TV camera, "They aren't going to score." Later in the season, Texas Tech beat Nebraska, 70–10, forcing the Cornhuskers to give up more points in a single game than they had before in their 114-year history. In 2005, the Red Raiders were losing to Kansas State, 13–10, late in the second quarter but won the game 59–20. Also in 2005, Tech had a halftime lead of 14–10 over Texas A&M. By the end of the game, they increased the margin to 56–17. It was the Aggies' worst loss to the Red Raiders in the 64-year-old series.

Leach was chosen to coach the South team during the 2007 inaugural Inta Juice North–South All-Star Classic game.

At the end of the 2008 season, Leach was 76–39 with the Red Raiders, including 7–2 against the Texas A&M Aggies and 2–7 against the Texas Longhorns. With a 5–4 record, he is the all-time winningest coach in postseason play in Tech football history. Leach was one of only sixteen active college football coaches who had never had a losing season after he left Texas Tech. This was followed by a 3–9 season in his seminal year with Washington State. Of those, he is among nine who have been a head coach for at least five seasons.

In February 2009, Leach signed a three-year contract extension with Texas Tech that would have paid him at least $2.5 million per year if he had stayed through 2013. Leach's guaranteed compensation would have been $1.6 million in 2006, $1.65 million in 2007, $1.75 million in 2008, $1.85 million in 2009 and $2.15 million in 2010.

==== 2007 Texas game controversy ====
During his post-game press conference after the 2007 loss against Texas, Leach used most of his time to rail against the officiating crew for what he felt were bad calls. He speculated that the officials may have favored Texas because the head official lived in Austin, because they were incompetent, or possibly because the conference wanted Texas to appear in a BCS bowl because of the increased appearance fees that such a bowl generates for the conference. Jim Vertuno of the Associated Press wrote, "Leach was upset officials disallowed two Tech touchdowns in the third quarter. The first was overruled when video replay clearly showed the receiver let the ball hit the ground. On the next play, a touchdown pass was negated by a holding penalty. Leach also wanted, but didn't get, a flag for roughing the quarterback." The Lubbock Avalanche-Journal reported, "Big 12 policy prohibits coaches from commenting publicly about game officials, so Leach's actions leave him open to reprimand, fine or worse." ESPN reported, "Big 12 official spokesman Bob Burda did not immediately respond to telephone messages seeking comment. Leach's rant will likely draw a fine from the league and possibly a suspension."

On November 13, 2007, the Big 12 fined Leach $10,000, the largest fine in Big 12 history. Leach also received a reprimand and was warned that further violations could result in suspension. In a Big 12 coaches' conference call that day, Leach added that he did not regret making any of the comments. Leach announced that he would appeal the fine. Tech alumni and fans began raising money to aid Leach in paying the penalty in the event that it was upheld. Optionally, the proceeds raised could be used charitably. So, just before Christmas 2007, Leach requested that the nearly $5,000 raised be used to purchase 400 hams to give to families in Lubbock, Texas. Future donations were to go to the university or athletic department. Following the 2008 Gator Bowl, in which Virginia scored twice on penalties against Tech for intentional grounding in the end zone, Leach joked, "I felt like we had a back there on the one safety, but I don't comment on officiating. I just give out hams is what I do."

==== 2008 season ====
Leach, along with players Graham Harrell and Michael Crabtree, were featured on the cover of the 2008 edition of Dave Campbell's Texas Football. The magazine predicted that the 2008 Red Raider football team would be the best in Texas and would challenge for the Big 12 South title. Following a 9–0 beginning to the season, including a win over the undefeated #1 Texas Longhorns, Texas Tech Athletic Director Gerald Myers announced that the university would renegotiate Leach's contract following the conclusion of the football regular season and give him an extension.

The Red Raiders ended the 2008 regular season with 11 wins and 1 loss, the best in school history. The season also marked the first win over a #1 ranked team. Tech, along with Oklahoma and Texas, shared the Big 12 Conference South division title. On December 2, 2008, the Associated Press named Leach the Big 12 Coach of the Year. He received 16 votes for the honor by the agency's panel, while Texas' Mack Brown got 4. He won co-Coach of the Year honors from the Big 12 coaches; Oklahoma's Bob Stoops received the same recognition for the same season. The Dallas Morning News named him Coach of the Year as well. He garnered the 2008 George Munger Award, which is given annually to the top college coach of the year by the Maxwell Football Club.

After much controversy about how the tie-breaker should be handled between Texas, Oklahoma, and Texas Tech fans, the Red Raiders ended up being left out of the BCS because of a rule that stated only two teams from each conference could enter BCS play per season. Oklahoma won the tie-breaker on account of their higher BCS ranking, ultimately losing to Florida in the national championship game. Texas Tech also ended up losing that year in the Cotton Bowl to Ole Miss 47–34.

Leach interviewed for the University of Washington head coaching job, which was vacated by Tyrone Willingham. ESPN reported that Leach withdrew his name from the coaching search following his interview. Auburn, where Tommy Tuberville resigned, had also been rumored to have contacted Leach. In an interview with the Associated Press, Tech quarterback Graham Harrell stated that there was a "great chance" Leach could leave. Harrell noted that Leach might leave for a newer challenge. After Leach withdrew his name from consideration for the Washington job, Harrell retracted his statements and believed Leach would remain the Red Raiders' coach.

Tech athletic director Gerald Myers had indicated that he would give a raise to Leach before Tech's bowl game, which he later negotiated. Leach and the university settled on a five-year extension worth $12.7 million after months of negotiations over the clauses of the contract.

==== 2009 season ====
On October 31, 2009, after the Red Raiders' win over Kansas, Leach tied his predecessor Spike Dykes as the all-time winningest coach in Texas Tech's 85-year football history. On November 21, 2009, Leach passed Dykes for first all-time on the school's wins list with a win over Oklahoma. He finished the 2009 season with a 9–4 record, culminating with a 41–31 win over Michigan State in the Alamo Bowl.

==== Firing ====
On December 28, 2009, Leach was suspended indefinitely by Texas Tech pending investigation of alleged inappropriate treatment of Adam James, son of former SMU and New England Patriots running back (and former ESPN college football analyst) Craig James. On December 16, James suffered a concussion. He was examined the next day, and told not to practice that afternoon due to the concussion. According to a James family source, Leach ordered him to stand in the equipment room near the Raiders' practice facility. According to the Lubbock Avalanche-Journal, school officials claim they gave Leach an ultimatum to apologize to James in writing by December 28 or Leach be suspended. His attorney, Ted Liggett, disputed the characterization of events as reported by the university and other news sources, and said that James had been treated reasonably in light of his condition.

Leach sought an injunction that would have allowed him to coach in the 2010 Alamo Bowl. However, on December 30, Texas Tech fired Leach, calling his refusal to apologize to James "a defiant act of insubordination." This was the day before Leach was reportedly owed an $800,000 tenure bonus and over $1,700,000 for contractual guaranteed income for 2009. Texas Tech lawyers handed a termination letter to Liggett just minutes before the two sides were to appear in a Lubbock courtroom for a hearing. Liggett was also told that Leach would not be allowed to coach in the Alamo Bowl regardless of how the hearing turned out. School officials later said that other incidents had come to light during its investigation of Leach, but declined to elaborate. Defensive coordinator Ruffin McNeill was named interim head coach and led the team during their appearance in the Alamo Bowl.

In a statement, Leach said that he believed the firing was motivated in part by simmering acrimony over the contract negotiations. He also said he planned to sue Texas Tech for wrongful termination.

On December 31, Leach spoke with The New York Times in his first interview since being fired from Texas Tech. He said that he did not know where James had been taken, having only ordered him taken "out of the light." He claimed the controversy stemmed from Craig James's constant lobbying for more playing time for his son, whom he characterized as lazy and feeling entitled.

On January 8, 2010, Leach formally filed suit against Texas Tech for wrongful termination and other claims. He claimed that school officials not only fired him without cause, but issued defamatory statements in a willful attempt to keep him from being hired elsewhere. During a deposition for the case obtained by the Lubbock Avalanche-Journal, Adam James admitted under oath that he found the closet incident "funny". In May 2010, District Judge Bill Sowder dismissed all but one of Leach's claims on the grounds of sovereign immunity, but he allowed Leach's claim for breach of contract to proceed, finding that Texas Tech had waived its immunity on this claim by its conduct. The judge also dismissed Leach's claims against three university administrators. Both parties took steps to appeal the decision, although Leach's attorneys said they would drop their appeal if Texas Tech would do likewise and allow the breach of contract claim to proceed to a jury trial. Early in 2011, Texas 7th Court of Appeals ruled that Texas Tech was immune from Leach's claim of breach of contract but that Leach can claim non-monetary reparations. Leach's attorney Paul Dobrowski announced his intention to appeal to the Supreme Court of Texas.

In February 2012, the Texas Supreme Court denied Leach's petition for review. After that denial, Texas Tech attorney Dicky Gregg stated "As we've said from the beginning, we were right on the law and the facts, and the (Texas) Supreme Court has just held that we were correct on the law."

In March 2012 Friday Night Lights series creator Peter Berg hinted that he had written a movie script for the characters from the TV series that is based on Leach's firing from Texas Tech.

On August 6, Judge Sowder issued a summary judgement dismissing Leach's lawsuits against ESPN, Spaeth Communications, and Craig James. Leach's attorneys indicated they would appeal.

=== Post-Texas Tech ===
In August 2010, Leach joined CBS College Sports Network, where he worked as a color analyst with play-by-play announcer Roger Twibell.

In 2010, Leach joined host Jack Arute to co-host "College Football Playbook" on SiriusXM College Sports Nation Channel 91, which airs weekdays 12 pm – 3 pm ET.

In 2011, Leach released an autobiographical book, Swing Your Sword: Leading the Charge in Football and in Life, through Diversion Books. The book debuted at number six on The New York Times Best Seller list.

Leach was considered by many in the national media to be a candidate for the head coaching vacancies at University of Miami, University of Maryland, and University of Minnesota following the 2010 regular season. After at least two interviews at Maryland, he was considered the frontrunner for that job until the administration decided instead to hire Randy Edsall away from UConn. Leach was mentioned in connection with a number of other vacancies in head-coaching positions during 2011, including Washington State, Arizona, Ole Miss, Kansas, Penn State, and Tulane.

=== Washington State ===
Leach agreed to terms with Washington State on November 30, 2011, and began coaching for the 2012 season. His five-year rollover contract made Leach the fourth-highest paid coach in the Pac-12. On December 5, 2019, Leach received a contract extension through 2024.

==== 2012 season ====
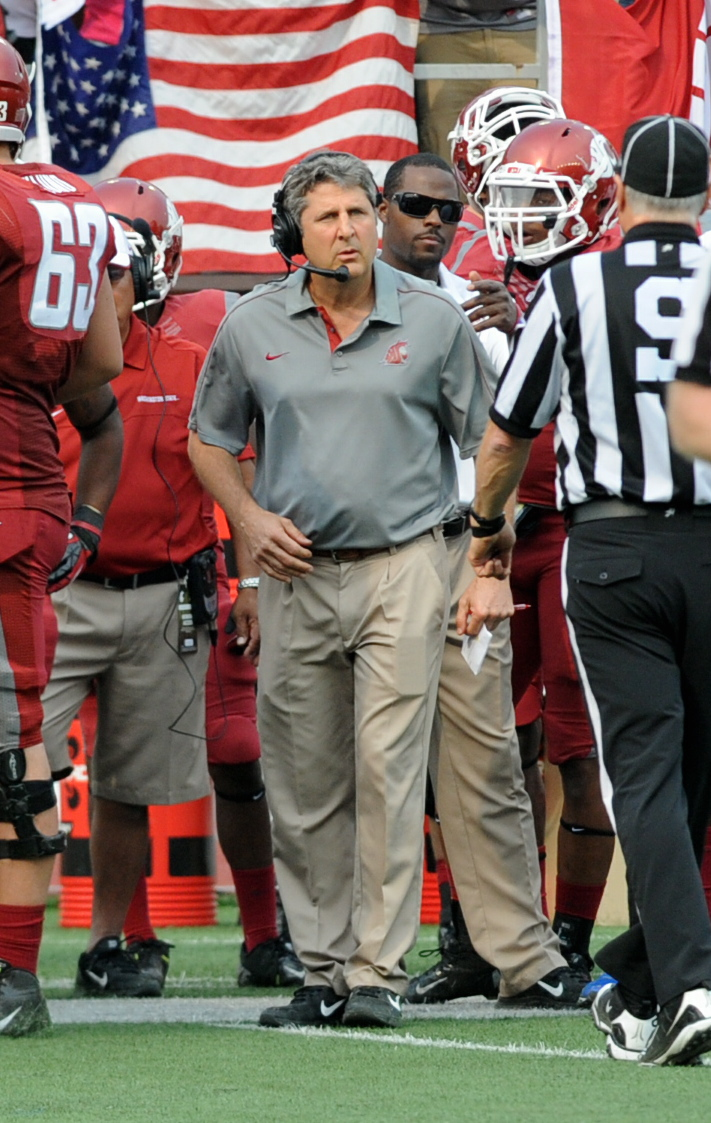
Leach during the 2012 season

Leach's first season in Pullman was a controversial one. Washington State was 3–9 overall and 1–8 in Pac-12 play; the lone wins were against FCS Eastern Washington, UNLV, and an upset of rival Washington in the Apple Cup in Pullman. On November 10, more allegations of player abuse erupted when star wide receiver Marquess Wilson quit the team citing "physical, emotional and verbal abuse" by the coaching staff. Immediately after the allegations were made, university president Elson Floyd issued a statement indicating that he had requested investigations into the alleged incident(s) from both the WSU Athletic Department and the Pac-12 Conference. The investigations determined that the claims made against Leach were without merit, and Wilson later recanted the allegations.

==== 2013 season ====
Leach led WSU to a 6–6 regular season in 2013 that had them bowl eligible for the first time in a decade. They were led on offense by Connor Halliday, who set school and conference records for passing. The Cougars defeated USC, California, Arizona, and Utah for a 4–5 conference record. Invited to the New Mexico Bowl in Albuquerque, WSU led most of the game, but lost 48–45 to the Colorado State Rams. Down by sixteen points with under three minutes to play, the Rams mounted an all-time great comeback, winning with a field goal as time expired in regulation. The Cougars led the nation in passing offense and total offense. Leach received a 2-year contract extension on November 18, 2013, after leading the Washington State Cougars to their best record since 2006.

==== 2014 season ====
The 2014 season saw the Cougars regress to a 3–9 record. The Cougars defeated Portland State 59–21, Utah 28–27, and Oregon State 39–32..

==== 2015 season ====
In 2015, despite a season-opening loss to FCS school Portland State, the Cougars had their breakthrough season of the Leach era with a 9–4 record, 6–3 in the Pac-12. The Cougars were invited to the Sun Bowl in El Paso, Texas, where they beat the Miami Hurricanes 20–14. This was the best Cougar record since the 2003 team went 10–3.

==== 2016 season ====
WSU began the 2016 season with two losses, but rallied off eight consecutive wins before dropping their final two games. The success of their season, led by Luke Falk at quarterback, landed them in the Holiday Bowl in San Diego where they lost 17–12 to Minnesota of the Big Ten. WSU finished 7–2 in the Pac-12, with notable wins over Oregon and #15 Stanford. It was the Cougars' best conference finish in thirteen seasons, but the bowl loss gave WSU an overall record of 8–5.

==== 2017 season ====
Washington State was 6–3 in the Pac-12 and 9–3 in 2017. They were again invited to the Holiday Bowl where they lost 42–17 to Michigan State and finished 9–4 overall.

==== 2018 season ====
Leach recruited graduate transfer Gardner Minshew at quarterback in time for the 2018 season and it paid big dividends. The Cougars won a school record-tying ten games, the first time they had won that many in the regular season since the Rose Bowl year of 2002. They also surged as high as seventh in major polling and went into the Apple Cup with a chance to clinch the Pac-12 North title and a shot at the Rose Bowl, but lost 28–15 to rival Washington in the snow in Pullman, a sixth consecutive loss to the Huskies. The 10–2 Cougars were invited to the Alamo Bowl in San Antonio to play the Iowa State Cyclones of the Big 12. They won 28–26 for a school record 11th win.

==== 2019 season ====
After Minshew went to the NFL, Leach led Washington State to a 6–7 record in 2019. Notably, Leach and the Cougars lost to unranked UCLA 67–63 while ranked #19 going into the game. Washington State ended the regular season with Leach's seventh consecutive Apple Cup loss to Washington.

=== Mississippi State ===
==== 2020 season ====
On January 9, 2020, Leach agreed to be the head coach of the Mississippi State Bulldogs. His contract was reported to pay him $5 million annually. The season started with a 44–34 upset victory over no. 6 LSU, who had won the CFP National Championship the previous season. The team struggled the rest of the season, winning only two more games, 24–17 over Vanderbilt and 51–32 over Missouri, finishing the regular season at 3–7. Despite the losing record, the Bulldogs were invited to the Armed Forces Bowl, as the NCAA waived bowl eligibility requirements due to the COVID-19 pandemic. Mississippi State faced off against no. 24 Tulsa, defeating the Golden Hurricane 28–26 to finish with an overall record of 4–7.

==== 2021 season ====
Leach led the Bulldogs to a 7–5 record in the 2021 regular season. The season was highlighted with ranked victories over Texas A&M, Kentucky, and Auburn. They qualified for the Liberty Bowl, where they lost 34–7 to Texas Tech.

==== 2022 season ====
Leach led the Bulldogs to a 8–4 record in the 2022 regular season. The Bulldogs recorded ranked victories over Texas A&M and Ole Miss. Leach died before the team's bowl game, an eventual 19–10 victory over Illinois in the ReliaQuest Bowl.

== Head coaching record ==
Year	Team	Overall	Conference	Standing	Bowl/playoffs	Coaches^{#}	AP^{°}
Texas Tech Red Raiders (Big 12 Conference) (2000–2009)
2000	Texas Tech	7–6	3–5	4th (South)	L Galleryfurniture.com		
2001	Texas Tech	7–5	4–4	T–3rd (South)	L Alamo		
2002	Texas Tech	9–5	5–3	T–2nd (South)	W Tangerine		
2003	Texas Tech	8–5	4–4	4th (South)	W Houston		
2004	Texas Tech	8–4	5–3	T–3rd (South)	W Holiday	17	18
2005	Texas Tech	9–3	6–2	T–2nd (South)	L Cotton	19	20
2006	Texas Tech	8–5	4–4	4th (South)	W Insight		
2007	Texas Tech	9–4	4–4	T–3rd (South)	W Gator	23	22
2008	Texas Tech	11–2	7–1	T–1st (South)	L Cotton	12	12
2009	Texas Tech	8–4	5–3	3rd (South)	Alamo (Note: Texas Tech fired Leach before the bowl game.)	23	21
Texas Tech:		84–43	47–33				
Washington State Cougars (Pac-12 Conference) (2012–2019)
2012	Washington State	3–9	1–8	6th (North)			
2013	Washington State	6–7	4–5	T–4th (North)	L New Mexico		
2014	Washington State	3–9	2–7	T–5th (North)			
2015	Washington State	9–4	6–3	3rd (North)	W Sun		
2016	Washington State	8–5	7–2	2nd (North)	L Holiday		
2017	Washington State	9–4	6–3	3rd (North)	L Holiday		
2018	Washington State	11–2	7–2	T–1st (North)	W Alamo	10	10
2019	Washington State	6–7	3–6	T–5th (North)	L Cheez-It		
Washington State:		55–47	36–36				
Mississippi State Bulldogs (Southeastern Conference) (2020–2022)
2020	Mississippi State	4–7	3–7	T–6th (Western)	W Armed Forces		
2021	Mississippi State	7–6	4–4	T–3rd (Western)	L Liberty		
2022	Mississippi State	8–4	4–4	T–3rd (Western)	ReliaQuest (Note: Leach died before the bowl game.)	19*	20*
Mississippi State:		19–16	11–14				
Total:		158–106					
National championship Conference title Conference division title or championship game berth
^{#}Rankings from final Coaches Poll.; ^{°}Rankings from final AP Poll.

== Achievements ==
=== Overall ===
- Won 18 games over AP-ranked teams while his own team was unranked, the most since the AP Poll was introduced in 1936.

=== Kentucky ===
- Four NCAA, 42 SEC, and 116 school records broken as Kentucky's offensive coordinator

=== Texas Tech ===
- 10 consecutive winning seasons
- 8 consecutive seasons with at least 8 wins
- 4 seasons with at least 9 wins
- 1 season with 11 wins
- 9 consecutive bowl appearances
- 5 bowl wins (most by any individual coach in the history of the program)
- 4 seasons completed with team ranked in the Top 25
- 19–11 record against in-state conference rivals Baylor, Texas, and Texas A&M
- 53–11 record at Jones AT&T Stadium, home of the Texas Tech Red Raider football team
- 2008 AP Big 12 Coach of the Year
- 2008 Big 12 Coach of the Year
- Coached 1 Fred Biletnikoff Award (Best Wide Receiver) winner: Michael Crabtree (two-time winner)
- Coached 1 Johnny Unitas Golden Arm Award (Best Senior Quarterback) winner: Graham Harrell
- Coached 1 Mosi Tatupu Award (Best Kick Returner) winner: Wes Welker
- Coached 3 Sammy Baugh Trophy (Outstanding Quarterback) winners: Kliff Kingsbury, B. J. Symons, and Graham Harrell
- More than 150 NCAA, Big 12 and school records broken as Texas Tech's head coach
- All-time winningest football coach in Texas Tech history

=== Washington State ===
- 2015 Pac-12 Coach of the Year
- 2018 Pac-12 Coach of the Year
- Four consecutive winning seasons
- First coach to win 11 games in a season
- Coached one Johnny Unitas Golden Arm Award (Best Senior Quarterback) winner: Gardner Minshew
- One top 10 finish
- Two bowl wins

=== Mississippi State ===
- First head coach to win against a top 10 ranked team in coaching debut
- Broke SEC and school record in passing yards in a single game

== Coaching tree ==
Although he did not play college football, Leach played wide receiver under John McDougall, the longtime coach at Cody High School in Cody, Wyoming. Under Coach MacDougall, Cody played in two top division state championships while Leach was a student, winning one in 1976 in triple overtime against coach John Deti's Laramie Plainsmen.

Head coaches under whom Leach served:

- Lyle Setencich: Cal Poly (1987)
- Hal Mumme: Iowa Wesleyan (1989–1991), Valdosta State (1992–1996), Kentucky (1997–1998)
- Bob Stoops: Oklahoma (1999)

Assistant coaches under Leach who became college head coaches:

- Dave Aranda: Baylor (2020–present)
- Zach Arnett: Mississippi State (2023)
- Art Briles: Houston (2003–2007), Baylor (2008–2015), Eastern New Mexico (2026–present)
- Jeff Choate: Montana State (2016–2020), Nevada (2024–present)
- Sonny Dykes: Louisiana Tech (2010–2012), California (2013–2016), SMU (2018–2021), TCU (2022–present)
- Dana Holgorsen: West Virginia (2011–2018), Houston (2019–2023)
- Seth Littrell: North Texas (2016–2022)
- Greg McMackin: Hawaii (2008–2011)
- Ruffin McNeill: East Carolina (2010–2015)
- Lincoln Riley: Oklahoma (2017–2021), USC (2022–present)
- JaMarcus Shephard: Oregon State (2026–present)
- Ken Wilson: Nevada (2022–2023)

Players under Leach who became college or NFL head coaches:

- Neal Brown: Troy (2015–2018), West Virginia (2019–2024), North Texas (2026–present)
- Sonny Cumbie: Louisiana Tech (2022–present)
- Josh Heupel: UCF (2018–2020), Tennessee (2021–present)
- Kliff Kingsbury: Texas Tech (2013–2018), Arizona Cardinals (2019–2023)
- Eric Morris: Incarnate Word (2018–2021), North Texas (2023–2025), Oklahoma State (2026–present)

== Personal life ==
Leach was the oldest of six siblings. He and his wife, Sharon, were the parents of four children, along with three grandchildren.

Leach was atypical among NCAA Division I head coaches in that he did not play college football.

Famous among fans for his fascination with 18th-century pirates such as Blackbeard and John Rackham, Leach lectured his players on the history of pirates, and told them before games to "swing their swords." His office had been described as a museum of pirate paraphernalia. Notably, his office at Washington State included a life-size statue of a singing pirate, a gift from basketball coaching legend Bob Knight, who had coached at Texas Tech for most of Leach's tenure at that school. In particular, Leach admired the teamwork exhibited by pirates:

Pirates function as a team. There were a lot of castes and classes in England at the time. But with pirates, it didn't matter if you were black, white, rich or poor. The object was to get a treasure. If the captain did a bad job, you could just overthrow him.

Leach spent time during each off-season pursuing non-sport interests. Besides pirates, he had studied topics such as Native American leader Geronimo, American pioneer Daniel Boone, grizzly bears, chimpanzees, whales, and American artist Jackson Pollock.

Leach made a cameo appearance on the TV series Friday Night Lights. In the show's fourth season, he portrayed a "random loon" at a gas station who implores a despondent coach Eric Taylor to "swing your sword" and "find your inner pirate."

During the spring of 2019, Leach co-taught a five-week seminar at Washington State, "Insurgent Warfare and Football Strategies," alongside Washington politician Michael Baumgartner.

== Death ==
On December 11, 2022, Leach experienced an undisclosed health issue and was hospitalized in Jackson, Mississippi. That evening, Sports Illustrated reporter Ross Dellenger reported that Leach was in critical condition. The Clarion-Ledger reported that Leach had suffered a massive heart attack and had not received medical attention for 10 to 15 minutes, and had also suffered seizures that may have contributed to brain damage as a result. He died the following day at the age of 61. In a statement, Mississippi State gave the cause of death as "complications due to a heart condition".
