= Jay Sawvel =

American football coach (born 1971)

Current position
- Title: Head coach
- Team: Wyoming
- Conference: MW
- Record: 14–21

Biographical details
- Born: March 14, 1971 (age 55); Barnesville, Ohio, U.S.

Playing career
- 1989–1993: Mount Union
- Position: Linebacker

Coaching career (HC unless noted)
- 1994–1995: Eastern Kentucky (GA)
- 1996–1998: Notre Dame (GA)
- 1999–2000: Ferris State (DB/ST)
- 2001–2007: Southern Illinois (DB/ST)
- 2008–2010: Northern Illinois (DB/ST)
- 2011–2015: Minnesota (DB/ST)
- 2016: Minnesota (DC/DB)
- 2017–2018: Wake Forest (DC/CB)
- 2020–2023: Wyoming (DC/S)
- 2024–present: Wyoming

Head coaching record
- Overall: 14–21

Jay Sawvel (born March 14, 1971) is an American college football coach. He is the head football coach for the University of Wyoming, a position he has held since 2024. He previously served as the defensive coordinator and safeties coach at the University of Wyoming from 2020 to 2023.

Sawvel played college football at University of Mount Union from 1989 to 1993. Prior to his tenure at the University of Wyoming, Sawvel previously served as an assistant coach at Wake Forest University, University of Minnesota, Northern Illinois University, Southern Illinois University Carbondale, Ferris State University, University of Notre Dame and Eastern Kentucky University.

== Early years ==
Born in Barnesville, Ohio, Sawvel played as a linebacker at the University of Mount Union from 1989 to 1993. He earned a bachelor's degree in sports management with minors in business administration, information systems and physical education at the University of Mount Union in 1993.

== Coaching career ==
=== Early career ===
In 1994, Sawvel began his coaching career at Eastern Kentucky University as a graduate assistant. From 1996 to 1998, Sawvel served as a graduate assistant at the University of Notre Dame before serving as a defensive backs and special teams coach at Ferris State University from 1999 to 2000.

=== Southern Illinois ===
In 2001, Sawvel was hired as the defensive backs and special teams coach at Southern Illinois University Carbondale under head coach Jerry Kill.

=== Northern Illinois ===
In 2008, Sawvel was hired by Northern Illinois University as their defensive backs and special teams coach, following head coach Jerry Kill.

=== Minnesota ===
In 2011, Sawvel was hired as the defensive backs and special teams coach at the University of Minnesota under head coach Jerry Kill.

In 2016, Sawvel was promoted to defensive coordinator and defensive backs coach under head coach Tracy Claeys.

=== Wake Forest ===
In 2017, Sawvel was hired by Wake Forest University as their defensive coordinator and cornerbacks coach under head coach Dave Clawson.

On September 23, 2018, Sawvel was fired as Wake Forest's defensive coordinator.

=== Wyoming ===
In 2020, Sawvel was named the defensive coordinator and safeties coach at the University of Wyoming under head coach Craig Bohl.

On December 6, 2023, Sawvel was named the 33rd head coach at Wyoming, replacing Bohl following his retirement.

== Personal life ==
Sawvel has two children. He has earned two master degrees from Eastern Kentucky University and the University of Notre Dame in administration.

== Head coaching record ==
Year	Team	Overall	Conference	Standing	Bowl/playoffs
Wyoming Cowboys (Mountain West Conference) (2024–present)
2024	Wyoming	3–9	2–5	T–10th	
2025	Wyoming	4–8	2–6	T–9th	
2026	Wyoming	7–4	6–2		
Wyoming:		14–21	10–13		
Total:		14–21			
