= 2016 Washington State Cougars football team =

American college football season

2016 Washington State Cougars football

Holiday Bowl, L 12–17 vs. Minnesota
- Conference: Pac-12 Conference
- North Division
- Record: 8–5 (7–2 Pac-12)
- Head coach: Mike Leach (5th season)
- Offensive scheme: Air raid
- Defensive coordinator: Alex Grinch (2nd season)
- Base defense: Multiple 3–4
- Home stadium: Martin Stadium

2016 Pac-12 Conference football standings
	Conf.			Overall
Team	W		L	W		L
North Division
No. 4 Washington xy$^	8	–	1	12	–	2
Washington State	7	–	2	8	–	5
No. 12 Stanford	6	–	3	10	–	3
California	3	–	6	5	–	7
Oregon State	3	–	6	4	–	8
Oregon	2	–	7	4	–	8
South Division
No. 17 Colorado xy	8	–	1	10	–	4
No. 3 USC	7	–	2	10	–	3
No. 23 Utah	5	–	4	9	–	4
Arizona State	2	–	7	5	–	7
UCLA	2	–	7	4	–	8
Arizona	1	–	8	3	–	9
Championship: Washington 41, Colorado 10
^ – College Football Playoff participant; $ – Conference champion; x – Division champion/co-champions; y – Championship game participant; Rankings from AP Poll

The 2016 Washington State Cougars football team represented Washington State University during the 2016 NCAA Division I FBS football season. The team was coached by fifth-year head coach Mike Leach and played their home games at Martin Stadium in Pullman, Washington. They were members of the North Division of the Pac-12 Conference. They finished the season 8–5, 7–2 in Pac-12 play to finish in second place in the North Division. They were invited to the Holiday Bowl where they were defeated by Minnesota.

== Schedule ==
Date	Time	Opponent	Rank	Site	TV	Result	Attendance
September 3	5:00 pm	No. 14 (FCS) Eastern Washington*		Martin Stadium; Pullman, WA	P12N	L 42–45	32,952
September 10	7:15 pm	at Boise State*		Albertsons Stadium; Boise, ID	ESPN2	L 28–31	36,163
September 17	11:00 am	Idaho*		Martin Stadium; Pullman, WA (Battle of the Palouse)	P12N	W 56–6	28,477
October 1	6:30 pm	Oregon		Martin Stadium; Pullman, WA	P12N	W 51–33	33,528
October 8	7:30 pm	at No. 15 Stanford		Stanford Stadium; Stanford, CA	ESPN	W 42–16	50,424
October 15	7:30 pm	UCLA^{†}		Martin Stadium; Pullman, WA	ESPN	W 27–21	29,310
October 22	7:00 pm	at Arizona State		Sun Devil Stadium; Tempe, AZ	P12N	W 37–32	50,582
October 29	7:45 pm	at Oregon State		Reser Stadium; Corvallis, OR	ESPN2	W 35–31	37,081
November 5	1:00 pm	Arizona	No. 25	Martin Stadium; Pullman, WA	P12N	W 69–7	33,547
November 12	7:30 pm	California	No. 23	Martin Stadium; Pullman, WA	ESPN	W 56–21	30,135
November 19	12:30 pm	at No. 10 Colorado	No. 22	Folsom Field; Boulder, CO	Fox	L 24–38	48,658
November 25	12:30 pm	No. 5 Washington	No. 23	Martin Stadium; Pullman, WA (Apple Cup)	FOX	L 17–45	33,773
December 27	1:00 pm	vs. Minnesota*		Qualcomm Stadium; San Diego, CA (Holiday Bowl)	ESPN	L 12–17	48,704
*Non-conference game; ^{†}Homecoming; Rankings from AP Poll and CFP Rankings after November 1 released prior to game; All times are in Pacific time

== Rankings ==
Ranking movements Legend: ██ Increase in ranking ██ Decrease in ranking — = Not ranked RV = Received votes
	Week															
Poll	Pre	1	2	3	4	5	6	7	8	9	10	11	12	13	14	Final
AP	RV	—	—	—	—	—	RV	RV	RV	25	23	20	23	RV	RV	RV
Coaches	RV	—	—	—	—	—	RV	RV	RV	25	23	20	23	RV	RV	RV
CFP	Not released									25	23	22	23	—	—	Not released

== Game summaries ==
=== Eastern Washington ===
	1	2	3	4	Total
#14 (FCS) Eagles	7	17	14	7	45
Cougars	14	14	0	14	42

=== At Boise State ===
	1	2	3	4	Total
Cougars	0	7	7	14	28
Broncos	14	3	7	7	31

=== Idaho ===
	1	2	3	4	Total
Vandals	3	0	3	0	6
Cougars	7	14	7	28	56

=== Oregon ===
	1	2	3	4	Total
Ducks	7	7	6	13	33
Cougars	7	21	2	21	51

=== At Stanford ===
	1	2	3	4	Total
Cougars	7	7	14	14	42
#15 Cardinal	0	3	7	6	16

=== UCLA ===
	1	2	3	4	Total
Bruins	0	0	7	14	21
Cougars	3	7	14	3	27

=== At Arizona State ===
	1	2	3	4	Total
Cougars	0	17	14	6	37
Sun Devils	7	7	7	11	32

=== At Oregon State ===
	1	2	3	4	Total
Cougars	0	6	22	7	35
Beavers	14	10	0	7	31

=== Arizona ===
	1	2	3	4	Total
Wildcats	0	7	0	0	7
#25 Cougars	24	14	14	17	69

=== California ===
	1	2	3	4	Total
Golden Bears	0	7	7	7	21
#23 Cougars	14	14	7	21	56

=== At Colorado ===
	1	2	3	4	Total
#20 Cougars	14	3	7	0	24
#12 Buffaloes	7	7	14	10	38

=== Washington ===
	1	2	3	4	Total
#6 Huskies	28	7	0	10	45
#23 Cougars	3	7	7	0	17

=== Minnesota–Holiday Bowl ===
	1	2	3	4	Total
Golden Gophers	0	3	7	7	17
Cougars	3	3	0	6	12

== Coaching staff ==
Name	Title	Years at WSU	Alma mater
Mike Leach	Head coach	6	BYU, 1983
Alex Grinch	Defensive coordinator/secondary coach	3	Mount Union, 2002
Jason Loscalzo	Strength and conditioning coach	6	Humboldt State, 1999
Roy Manning	Outside linebackers coach	3	Michigan, 2004
Jim Mastro	Running backs coach	6	Cal Poly, 1994
Clay McGuire	Offensive line coach	6	Texas Tech, 2004
Eric Mele	Special teams coach	3	William Paterson, 2002
Dave Nichol	Outside receivers coach	2	Texas Tech, 1999
Ken Wilson	Linebackers coach	4	North Central, 1986
Brian Odom	Defensive quality control coach	2	Southeastern Oklahoma State, 2004
