= Drew Wolitarsky =

American gridiron football player (born 1993)

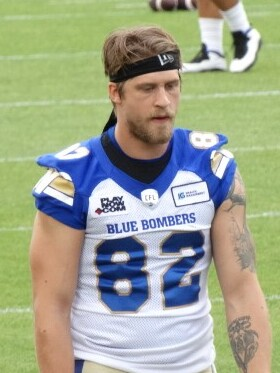
- Wolitarsky with the Winnipeg Blue Bombers in 2022

Profile
- Position: Wide receiver

Personal information
- Born: March 22, 1995 (age 31); Santa Clarita, California, U.S.
- Listed height: 6 ft 2 in (1.88 m)
- Listed weight: 223 lb (101 kg)

Career information
- High school: Canyon High
- College: Minnesota
- CFL draft: 2017

Career history
- 2017–2024: Winnipeg Blue Bombers
- 2025: Hamilton Tiger-Cats

Awards and highlights
- 2× Grey Cup champion (2019, 2021)

Career CFL statistics
- Games played: 98
- Receptions: 227
- Receiving yards: 2,954
- Receiving touchdowns: 18
- Stats at CFL.ca

Drew William Wolitarsky (born March 22, 1995) is an American–Canadian former professional football wide receiver. He most recently played for the Hamilton Tiger-Cats of the Canadian Football League (CFL). He is a two-time Grey Cup champion after winning with the Blue Bombers in 2019 and 2021.

== College career ==
Wolitarksy played for the Minnesota Golden Gophers from 2013 to 2016. Over the course of his collegiate career, he played in 47 games where he recorded 130 receptions for 1,749 yards and nine touchdowns. In his final game as a college athlete, in the 2016 Holiday Bowl, Wolitarsky led his team in receiving with five catches for 73 yards in the upset win over the Washington State Cougars.

== Professional career ==
Pre-draft measurables
Height	Weight	Arm length	Hand span	40-yard dash	10-yard split	20-yard split	20-yard shuttle	Three-cone drill	Vertical jump	Broad jump	Bench press
6 ft 2 1/8 in (1.88 m)	219 lb (99 kg)	32 1/8 in (0.82 m)	9 1/8 in (0.23 m)	4.68 s	1.56 s	2.59 s	4.22 s	6.88 s	32.0 in (0.81 m)	9 ft 7 in (2.92 m)	14 reps
All values from Pro Day

=== Winnipeg Blue Bombers ===
Following his time with the Golden Gophers, Wolitarsky was not selected in the 2017 NFL draft and had an unsuccessful tryout with the Minnesota Vikings. His brother, Austin, encouraged him pursue a career in the Canadian Football League where he could qualify as a National player with a Canadian citizenship since his mother was from Montreal. He applied for his citizenship, got it approved in one day, and notified the Canadian Football League Players' Association who relayed the information to the league's teams. Since the 2017 CFL draft had already passed, Wolitarsky was made eligible in a supplemental draft where he was selected by the Winnipeg Blue Bombers on June 27, 2017 who forfeited a third round selection in the 2018 CFL draft for his playing rights. He signed a practice roster agreement on July 11, 2017. Wolitarsky played in his first professional game on October 6, 2017 against the Hamilton Tiger-Cats where he had one catch for 15 yards. He played in five regular season games in his rookie season and also dressed in the team's West Semi-Final loss to the Edmonton Eskimos.

Wolitarsky earned a starting position with the Blue Bombers following 2018 training camp and in his first career regular season start on June 14, 2021, against the Eskimos, he scored his first career touchdown on a 20-yard reception from his former college teammate, Chris Streveler. He had a career-high 10 receptions for 90 yards in an August 25, 2018, game against the Calgary Stampeders. He played and started in all 18 regular season games where he had 45 catches for 650 yards and five touchdowns. He also started in both post-season games where he totalled six receptions for 81 yards and one touchdown.

During his third season with the Blue Bombers, Wolitarsky played and started in 17 regular season games and had 33 catches for 361 yards and four touchdowns. He also played in both playoff games, recording five catches for 78 yards, leading to Wolitarsky playing in his first Grey Cup championship game. In the 107th Grey Cup, he had three catches for 40 yards as the Blue Bombers defeated the Hamilton Tiger-Cats 33-12 and Wolitarsky won his first championship. After that season, he signed a two-year extension to remain in Winnipeg through the 2021 season. However, he did not play in 2020 due to the cancellation of the 2020 CFL season. In 2021, Wolitarsky produced 386 yards and one touchdown on 32 receptions. He also played in both post-season games that year, including the 108th Grey Cup game where he had four receptions for 48 yards as he won his second Grey Cup championship.

In 2022, Wolitarsky played in 14 regular season games where he had 36 catches for 471 yards and one touchdown. He also had one catch for eight yards in the 109th Grey Cup loss to the Toronto Argonauts. In the 2023 season, he played in all 18 regular season games where he had a career-high 47 receptions for 668 yards and six touchdowns. He played in his fourth Grey Cup game where he had one catch for nine yards in the 110th Grey Cup against the Montreal Alouettes. Wolitarsky played in just 10 games in 2024 where he had 33 catches for 403 yards and one touchdown. After seven seasons with the Blue Bombers, he was released on January 27, 2025.

=== Hamilton Tiger-Cats ===
On February 2, 2025, it was announced that the Hamilton Tiger-Cats had signed Wolitarsky. He played in just two games, recording no statistics, and was released in the following off-season on January 26, 2026.

=== Retirement ===
Wolitarsky announced his retirement from professional football on February 19, 2026, signing a one-day contract with Winnipeg to retire as a Blue Bomber.

=== Statistics ===
Receiving		Regular season							Postseason
Year	Team	GP	GS	Rec	Yards	Avg	Long	TD	GP	GS	Rec	Yards	Avg	Long	TD
2017	WPG	5	0	1	15	15.0	15	0	1	1	0	0	0.0	0	0
2018	WPG	18	18	45	650	14.4	60	5	2	2	6	81	13.5	20	1
2019	WPG	17	17	33	361	10.9	24	4	3	3	8	118	14.8	34	0
2020	WPG	Season cancelled							Season cancelled
2021	WPG	14	14	32	386	12.1	37	1	2	2	6	70	11.7	19	0
2022	WPG	14	14	36	471	13.1	41	1	2	2	3	35	11.7	18	0
2023	WPG	18	18	47	668	14.2	36	6	2	2	2	19	9.5	10	0
2024	WPG	10	10	33	403	12.2	25	1	Injured
2025	HAM	2	0	0	0	0.0	0	0	0	0	0	0	0.0	0	0
CFL totals		98	91	227	2,954	13.0	60	18	12	12	25	323	12.9	34	1

== Personal life ==
Wolitarksy was born in Santa Clarita, California, to John and Audrey Wolitarsky. His mother was originally from Montreal where she met his father, who was from the United States but living in Montreal. Due to his mother's Canadian citizenship, Wolitarsky pursued his own citizenship for Canada and received it in time to be able to play in the 2017 CFL season. Wolitarsky is also a musician and released his first EP on January 29, 2021.

On March 8, 2024, it was announced via instagram that he had married his fiance, Savannah Benton. The subsequently announced they were expecting on April 25, 2024, also via their instagram.
