= Luke Falk =

American football player (born 1994)

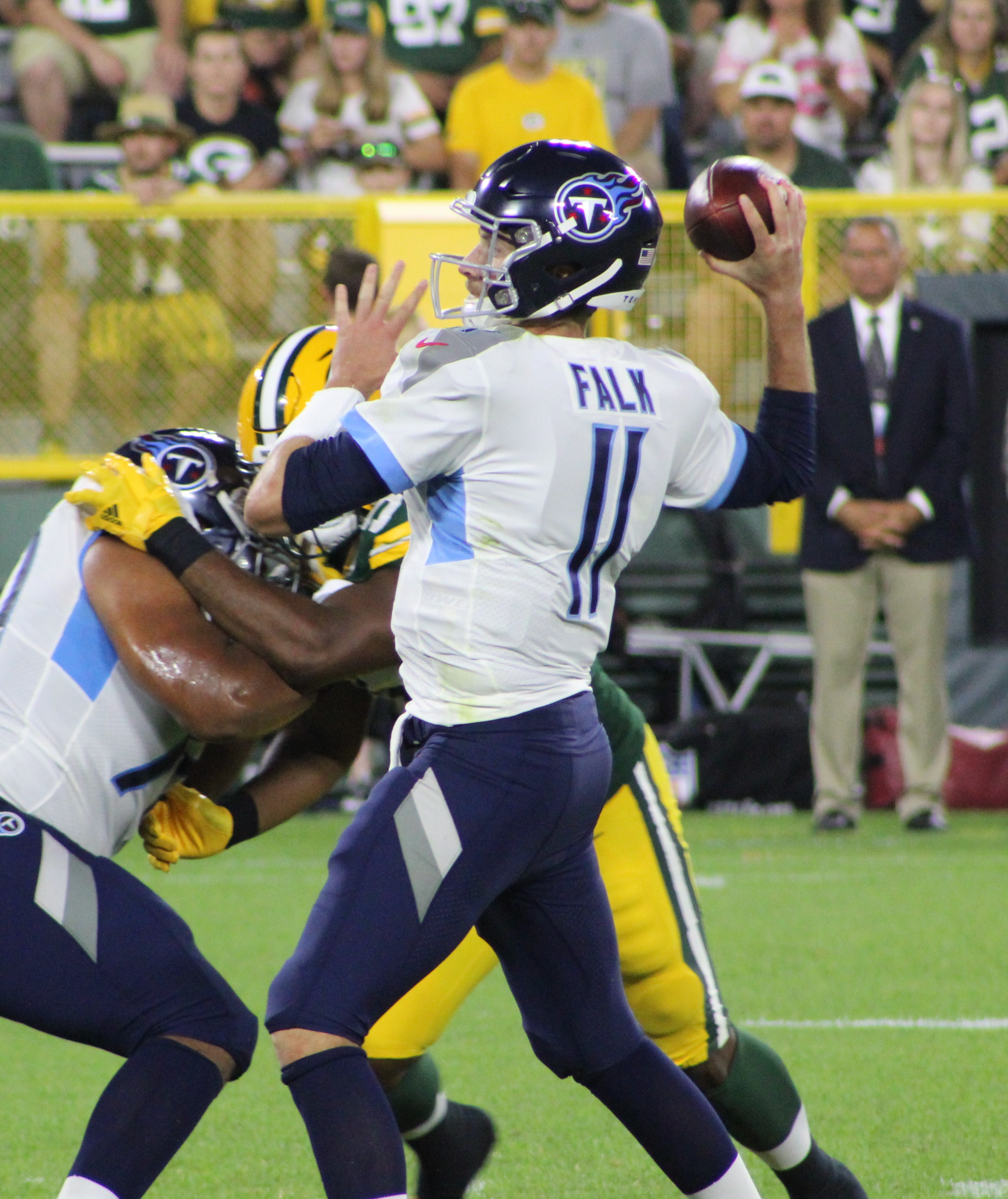
- Falk with the Tennessee Titans in 2018

No. 8, 11
- Position: Quarterback

Personal information
- Born: December 28, 1994 (age 31); Logan, Utah, U.S.
- Listed height: 6 ft 4 in (1.93 m)
- Listed weight: 215 lb (98 kg)

Career information
- High school: Logan
- College: Washington State (2013–2017)
- NFL draft: 2018: 6th round, 199th overall pick

Career history

Playing
- Tennessee Titans (2018)*; Miami Dolphins (2018); New York Jets (2019); Saskatchewan Roughriders (2021)*
- * Offseason or practice squad member only

Coaching
- Wingate (2023) Quarterbacks coach

Awards and highlights
- Burlsworth Trophy (2017); First-team All-Pac-12 (2015); Second-team All-Pac-12 (2016)

Career NFL statistics
- Passing attempts: 73
- Passing completions: 47
- Completion percentage: 64.4%
- Passing yards: 416
- TD–INT: 0–3
- Passer rating: 62.4
- Stats at Pro Football Reference

Lucas Andrew Falk (born December 28, 1994) is an American former professional football player who was a quarterback in the National Football League (NFL). He played college football for the Washington State Cougars, and was selected by the Tennessee Titans in the sixth round of the 2018 NFL draft. Falk was also a member of the Miami Dolphins, New York Jets and Saskatchewan Roughriders.

Falk started the 2019 season as the third quarterback on the roster of the Jets and played in three games, due to an illness affecting starting quarterback Sam Darnold and an injury to Trevor Siemian sustained in Week 2 of the regular season. Falk struggled with the Jets and was released mid-season following Darnold's return.

== Early life ==
Falk was born in Logan, Utah, and moved to California where he attended Oaks Christian School in Westlake Village. He has two older sisters, Alexa Shea Falk Johns and Natalee Marie Falk, who formed a sibling country music duo Falk. Prior to his junior year, Falk moved back to Logan and attended Logan High School. As a senior, he threw for 3,618 yards with 36 touchdowns and broke Utah records for pass attempts (562) and pass completions (330).

== College career ==
Falk originally committed to Cornell University but de-committed following the departure of head coach Kent Austin. Falk then joined Washington State University as a walk-on. After redshirting in 2013, Falk entered 2014 as the backup to Connor Halliday. After Halliday was injured, Falk took over as the starter for the final three games. In his first career start he threw for 471 yards and five touchdowns and earned conference offensive player and national quarterback of the week honors. Overall, he appeared in six games, completing 156 of 243 passes for 1,859 yards with 13 touchdowns and seven interceptions. He retained his starting job for the 2015 season and proceeded to lead the nation in passing yards per game (380.5), while finishing second in the nation in pass completion percentage (69.45), and earning first-team all-Pac-12 Conference honors, becoming the ninth Washington State quarterback in the 100-year of the conference to be named first-team. He guided the 2015 Cougars to a 9–3 record that included a Sun Bowl win over Miami and dramatic, come-from-behind victories over UCLA, Oregon and Rutgers. Falk adheres to a strict diet to enhance performance, and wears a signature wristband in every game to salute his favorite youth basketball coach who died unexpectedly. As of week 12 of the 2017 season, Falk holds Pac-12 Football records for career passing attempts, completions, completion percentage, passing yards, and passing touchdowns. On January 26, 2018, Falk announced that he would forgo the Senior Bowl to attend the funeral for Tyler Hilinski.

=== College statistics ===
Season	Team	Games		Passing						
Season	Team	GP	Record	Cmp	Att	Pct	Yds	TD	Int	Rtg
2014	Washington State	5	2–3	156	243	64.2	1,859	13	7	140.4
2015	Washington State	13	9–4	447	644	69.4	4,561	38	8	145.9
2016	Washington State	13	8–5	443	633	70.0	4,468	38	11	145.6
2017	Washington State	12	9–3	357	534	66.9	3,593	30	13	137.0
Total		42	28–15	1,403	2,054	68.3	14,481	119	39	142.8

== Professional career ==
Pre-draft measurables
Height	Weight	Arm length	Hand span	Vertical jump	Broad jump	Wonderlic
6 ft 3 5/8 in (1.92 m)	215 lb (98 kg)	32 in (0.81 m)	9 1/4 in (0.23 m)	26.5 in (0.67 m)	8 ft 7 in (2.62 m)	29
All values from NFL Combine

=== Tennessee Titans ===
Falk was selected by the Tennessee Titans in the sixth round (199th overall) of the 2018 NFL draft. He played in every preseason game while starting the final game against the Minnesota Vikings. On September 1, 2018, Falk was waived by the Titans.

=== Miami Dolphins ===
On September 2, 2018, Falk was claimed off waivers by the Miami Dolphins. He was placed on injured reserve on October 5, with a wrist injury. On May 1, 2019, the Dolphins waived Falk.

=== New York Jets ===
On May 2, 2019, Falk was claimed off waivers by the New York Jets. He was waived on August 31, 2019, and was signed to the practice squad the next day. On September 12, 2019, Falk was promoted to the active roster. He made his NFL regular season debut on Monday Night Football against the Cleveland Browns on September 16, 2019, after an injury to backup quarterback Trevor Siemian, who himself made the start in place of Sam Darnold, who was out with mononucleosis. Falk finished his first NFL game 20-of-25 with 198 yards and a quarterback rating of 99.7. Making his first career start against the defending Super Bowl champion New England Patriots in Week 3, Falk was only able to pull off 98 passing yards on 12 out of 22 completions with an interception as the Jets lost 30–14. Following a bye week, Falk made his second career start against the Philadelphia Eagles in Week 5, where he finished with 120 passing yards and 2 interceptions as the Jets lost 31–6. He was waived on October 12.

=== Saskatchewan Roughriders ===
Falk signed with the Saskatchewan Roughriders of the Canadian Football League on February 19, 2021. He was projected as one of the team's backups behind starter Cody Fajardo. Falk was placed on the suspended list on July 3. He was released on July 24.

== Coaching career ==
In 2023, Falk was named the quarterbacks coach for Wingate under head coach Joe Reich.

In 2024, Falk joined Northern Iowa as the offensive coordinator and quarterbacks coach under head coach Mark Farley. He left the team for personal reasons before the start of the season.
