= Jack Lynn (American football) =

American football player (born 1993)

Profile
- Position: Linebacker

Personal information
- Born: August 6, 1993 (age 33); Lake Zurich, Illinois
- Listed height: 6 ft 2 in (1.88 m)
- Listed weight: 246 lb (112 kg)

Career information
- High school: Lake Zurich (IL)
- College: Minnesota
- NFL draft: 2017: undrafted

Career history
- Atlanta Falcons (2017)*
- * Offseason or practice squad member only

Jack Lynn (born August 6, 1993) is an American former football linebacker. He played college football at Minnesota.

== Professional career ==
Lynn signed with the Atlanta Falcons as an undrafted free agent on June 6, 2017. He was waived on September 1, 2017.
