= Rodney Smith (running back) =

American football player (born 1996)

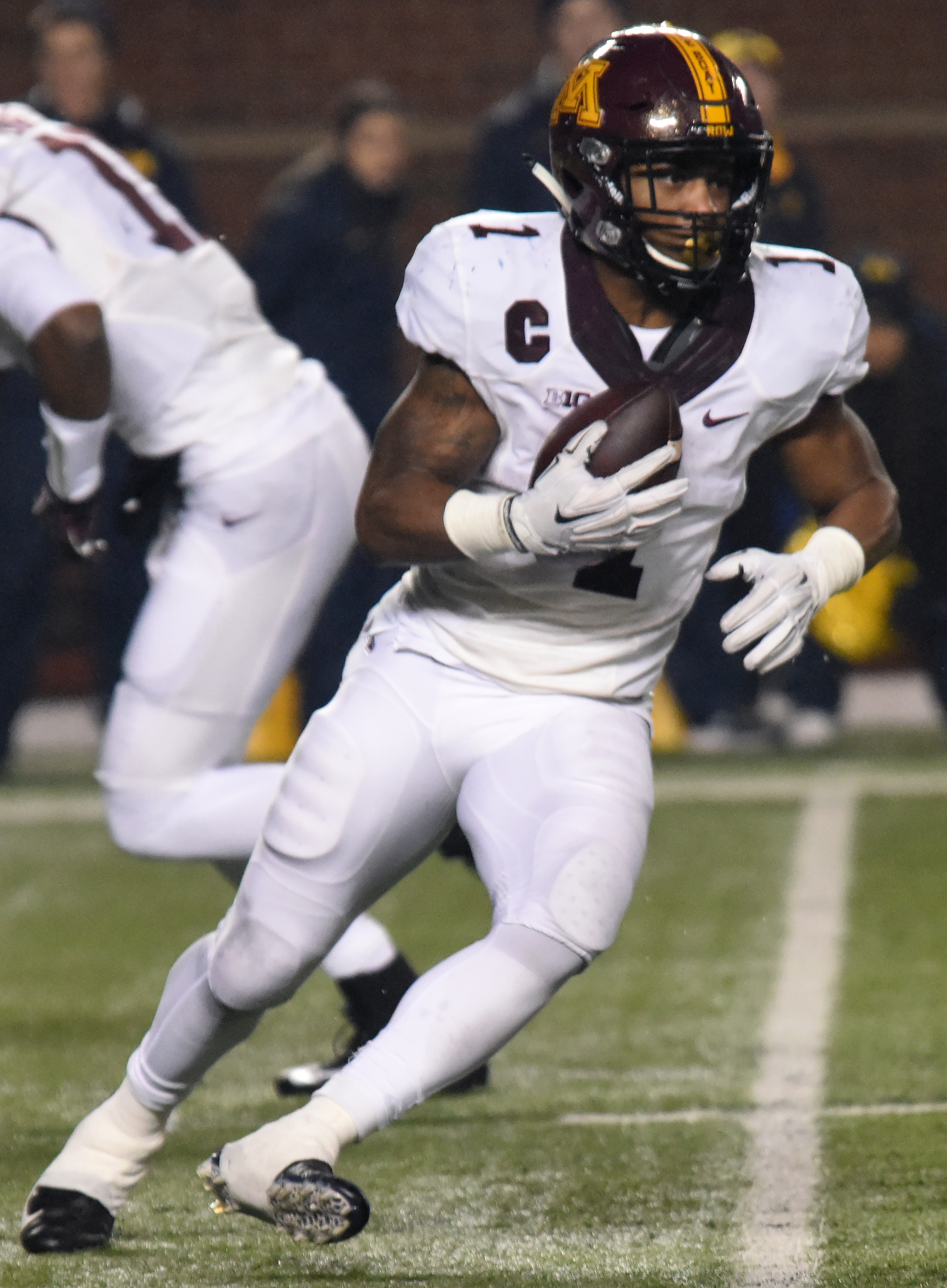
- Smith with the Minnesota Golden Gophers in 2017

No. 35, 20
- Position: Running back

Personal information
- Born: February 28, 1996 (age 30); Atlanta, Georgia, U.S.
- Listed height: 5 ft 11 in (1.80 m)
- Listed weight: 210 lb (95 kg)

Career information
- High school: Mundy's Mill (Jonesboro, Georgia)
- College: Minnesota (2014–2019)
- NFL draft: 2020: undrafted

Career history
- Carolina Panthers (2020–2021); Tennessee Titans (2021)*; Detroit Lions (2021)*; Saskatchewan Roughriders (2023)*; Pittsburgh Maulers (2024)*
- * Offseason or practice squad member only

Awards and highlights
- Second-team All-Big Ten (2019); Third-team All-Big Ten (2016)

Career NFL statistics
- Rushing yards: 156
- Rushing average: 3.8
- Rushing touchdowns: 1
- Receptions: 14
- Receiving yards: 107
- Stats at Pro Football Reference

Rodney Smith (born February 28, 1996) is an American former professional football player who was a running back in the National Football League (NFL) for two seasons. He played college football for the Minnesota Golden Gophers.

== Early life ==
A 2014 graduate of Mundy's Mill High School, Smith played both football and baseball. As a senior, Smith helped lead Mundy's Mill to its best record to date, 8–5, while rushing for 261 times for 2,201 yards and earning first team all-state honors. As a baseball player, Smith finished his career by being named the Region 4-AAAAA Player of the Year in Georgia.

As a recruit, Smith was ranked a three-star prospect and the 71st best running back in the 2014 recruiting class by 247Sports. Smith was also rated as a three-star prospect by ESPN and Scout, while Rivals listed him as a two-star prospect. Smith committed to Minnesota over offers from East Carolina, Southern Miss, and others, citing the prestige of a Big Ten degree and Minnesota's physical rushing-based offense as key reasons for his decision.

== College career ==
=== Freshman season ===
After redshirting during the 2014 season, Smith played in 12 of Minnesota's 13 games as a redshirt freshman during the 2015 season, rushing 157 times for 670 yards and 2 touchdowns.

=== Sophomore season ===
During his sophomore campaign, Smith took the lead role in the Gophers' backfield, starting the majority of games while splitting the overall workload with fellow sophomore Shannon Brooks. During the regular season, Smith rushed for 1,084 yards and 15 touchdowns, earning third-team all-Big Ten Conference honors for his efforts. The 15 touchdowns would also rank, at the time, as the third most rushing touchdowns in a single season for a Gophers running back. The Gophers would qualify for the Holiday Bowl, taking on Washingston State. Smith starred in the game, leading all rushers with 17 carries for 74 yards and added a touchdown, which earned him the offensive MVP award for the Holiday Bowl.

=== Junior season ===
Smith continued to be the lead back for the Gophers during the 2017 season, sharing carries with Shannon Brooks and Kobe McCrary, but saw his production decrease as the production of the offense as a whole decreased. This was due to many factors, mainly a first-year head coach in P. J. Fleck, a first-year offensive coordinator in Kirk Ciarrocca, as well as inconsistent QB play after the departure of 3-year starter Mitch Leidner. Still, Smith ran for 977 yards, which was 7th in the Big Ten, as well as 3 touchdowns that earned him an all-Big Ten honorable mention from the coaches and media.

=== (Redshirt) Senior season ===
Smith started off his senior campaign in 2018 with a bang, rushing for a (then) career-high 156 yards against New Mexico State in a 48–10 victory. However, in the next game against Fresno State, on just the third play from scrimmage, Smith tore his ACL on his left knee. This injury kept him out for the remainder of the season. Smith was then granted a 6th year of eligibility by the NCAA, having already redshirted once during his first year on campus.

=== Senior season ===
As a sixth year senior, Smith once again emerged as the primary ball carrier, while sophomore Mohamed Ibrahim and fellow senior Shannon Brooks also shared the workload. After a relatively slow start in the Gophers' three non-conference games, Smith ran for over 100 yards and at least 1 touchdown in each of the first five conference games, including a career-high 211 yard performance on just 24 carries against Illinois. Smith finished the season with a career-high 1,163 rushing yards. That number was good for 3rd in the Big Ten, behind only J. K. Dobbins and Jonathan Taylor. He also ran for 8 touchdowns, and was awarded all-Big Ten 2nd team honors by both the coaches and media. Smith left Minnesota 2nd all-time in rushing, with 4,125 yards, 6th all-time in rushing touchdowns, with 29, 2nd all-time in yards from scrimmage, with 4,646, and 1st all-time in all-purpose yards, with 5,444.

== Professional career ==
Pre-draft measurables
Height	Weight
5 ft 10 in (1.78 m)	210 lb (95 kg)
All values from Pro Day

=== Carolina Panthers ===
After not being selected in the 2020 NFL draft, Smith signed with the Carolina Panthers as an undrafted free agent. He was waived on August 1, 2020. He was signed to the practice squad on October 12, 2020. He was promoted to the active roster on November 14, 2020. In Week 10 of the 2020 season, he made his NFL debut against the Tampa Bay Buccaneers and had three carries for 13 rushing yards. In the final game of the 2020 NFL season, he scored his first career rushing touchdown against Carolina's division rivals New Orleans Saints in a 33-7 loss.

On August 31, 2021, Smith was waived by the Panthers, and re-signed to the practice squad the next day. He was released on October 11.

=== Tennessee Titans ===
Smith signed with the Tennessee Titans' practice squad on November 23, 2021. He was released on December 8.

=== Detroit Lions ===
On December 11, 2021, Smith was signed to the Detroit Lions practice squad. He was released on January 8, 2022.

=== Saskatchewan Roughriders ===
On March 13, 2023, Smith was signed by the Saskatchewan Roughriders of the Canadian Football League. On June 4, 2023, Smith was released by the Roughriders. He was re-signed on June 20, and released again on July 25.

=== Pittsburgh Maulers ===
On September 23, 2023, Smith signed with the Pittsburgh Maulers of the United States Football League (USFL). The Maulers folded when the XFL and USFL merged to create the United Football League (UFL).

=== Retirement ===
Smith announced his retirement from football on January 17, 2024, via an Instagram post.

== Career statistics ==
=== NFL ===
Regular season statistics
Year	Team	GP	GS	Rushing					Receiving					Fumbles	
Year	Team	GP	GS	Att	Yds	Avg	Lng	TD	Rec	Yds	Avg	Lng	TD	FUM	Lost
2020	CAR	7	1	41	156	3.8	13	1	9	59	6.6	12	0	1	0
2021	CAR	2	0	0	0	0.0	0	0	5	48	9.6	17	0	0	0
Total		9	1	41	156	3.8	13	1	14	107	7.6	17	0	1	0
Source: NFL.com

=== College ===
Smith's statistics are as follows:

Minnesota Golden Gophers
Season	Rushing					Receiving		
Season	Att	Yards	Avg	Yds/G	TD	Rec	Yards	TD
2014	Redshirt							
2015	157	670	4.3	55.8	2	16	124	0
2016	240	1,158	4.8	89.1	16	23	188	0
2017	229	977	4.3	81.4	3	17	107	0
2018	25	154	6.2	77	0	2	32	0
2019	228	1,163	5.1	89.5	8	7	70	0
Career	879	4,125	4.7	81.54	29	65	521	0
