= Josh Hart (disambiguation) =

Josh Hart (born 1995) is an American basketball player who plays for the New York Knicks.

Josh Hart is also the name of:

- Josh Hart (racer) (born 1983), American race car driver
- Josh Hart (baseball) (born 1994), American former baseball player
