= 2013 Major League Baseball draft =

Major League Draft

General information
- Date: June 6–8, 2013
- Location: Secaucus, New Jersey
- Network: MLB Network

Overview
- 1,216 total selections
- First selection: Mark Appel; Houston Astros
- First round selections: 39

The 2013 Major League Baseball draft was held from June 6 through June 8, 2013. The first two rounds were broadcast from Studio 42 of the MLB Network in Secaucus, New Jersey.

Each team received one selection per round, going in reverse order of the 2012 MLB season final standings. In addition, teams could receive compensation draft picks if they had made a qualifying offer to a free agent player from their team, and the player rejected the offer and signed with another team.

== Draft order ==
The Washington Nationals, Atlanta Braves, Milwaukee Brewers, and Los Angeles Angels of Anaheim all surrendered their first round picks by signing players who had received and rejected qualifying offers from their previous teams: Rafael Soriano, B. J. Upton, Kyle Lohse, and Josh Hamilton, respectively. The Cleveland Indians, whose first round pick was protected as it fell in the top ten, lost their second round pick and a pick in the sandwich round between the second and third rounds for signing two players who received qualifying offers: Nick Swisher and Michael Bourn.

	All-Star/All-MLB Team
*	Player did not sign

=== First round ===
Pick	Player	Team	Position	School
1	Mark Appel	Houston Astros	Right-handed pitcher	Stanford
2	Kris Bryant	Chicago Cubs	Third baseman	San Diego
3	Jon Gray	Colorado Rockies	Right-handed pitcher	Oklahoma
4	Kohl Stewart	Minnesota Twins	Right-handed pitcher	St. Pius X High School (TX)
5	Clint Frazier	Cleveland Indians	Outfielder	Loganville High School (GA)
6	Colin Moran	Miami Marlins	Third baseman	North Carolina
7	Trey Ball	Boston Red Sox	Left-handed pitcher	New Castle High School (IN)
8	Hunter Dozier	Kansas City Royals	Shortstop	Stephen F. Austin
9	Austin Meadows	Pittsburgh Pirates (Note: Compensation pick for failing to sign Mark Appel in the 2012 Major League Baseball draft)	Outfielder	Grayson High School (GA)
10	Phil Bickford*	Toronto Blue Jays	Right-handed pitcher	Oaks Christian School (CA)
11	Dominic Smith	New York Mets	First baseman	Serra High School (CA)
12	D. J. Peterson	Seattle Mariners	Third baseman	New Mexico
13	Hunter Renfroe	San Diego Padres	Outfielder	Mississippi State
14	Reese McGuire	Pittsburgh Pirates	Catcher	Kentwood High School (WA)
15	Braden Shipley	Arizona Diamondbacks	Right-handed pitcher	Nevada
16	J. P. Crawford	Philadelphia Phillies	Shortstop	Lakewood High School (CA)
17	Tim Anderson	Chicago White Sox	Shortstop	East Central CC (MS)
18	Chris Anderson	Los Angeles Dodgers	Right-handed pitcher	Jacksonville
19	Marco Gonzales	St. Louis Cardinals	Left-handed pitcher	Gonzaga
20	Jonathon Crawford	Detroit Tigers	Right-handed pitcher	Florida
21	Nick Ciuffo	Tampa Bay Rays	Catcher	Lexington High School (SC)
22	Hunter Harvey	Baltimore Orioles	Right-handed pitcher	Bandys High School (NC)
23	Chi Chi Gonzalez	Texas Rangers	Right-handed pitcher	Oral Roberts
24	Billy McKinney	Oakland Athletics	Outfielder	Plano West High School (TX)
25	Christian Arroyo	San Francisco Giants	Shortstop	Hernando High School (FL)
26	Eric Jagielo	New York Yankees	Third baseman	Notre Dame
27	Phillip Ervin	Cincinnati Reds	Outfielder	Samford

=== Compensatory round ===
Pick	Player	Team	Position	School
28	Rob Kaminsky	St. Louis Cardinals (Note: Compensation pick for the Milwaukee Brewers signing Kyle Lohse)	Left-handed pitcher	Saint Joseph Regional High School (NJ)
29	Ryne Stanek	Tampa Bay Rays (Note: Compensation pick for the Atlanta Braves signing B. J. Upton)	Right-handed pitcher	Arkansas
30	Travis Demeritte	Texas Rangers (Note: Compensation pick for the Los Angeles Angels of Anaheim signing Josh Hamilton)	Shortstop	Winder-Barrow High School (GA)
31	Jason Hursh	Atlanta Braves (Note: Compensation pick for the Cleveland Indians signing Michael Bourn)	Right-handed pitcher	Oklahoma State
32	Aaron Judge	New York Yankees (Note: Compensation pick for the Cleveland Indians signing Nick Swisher)	Outfielder	Fresno State
33	Ian Clarkin	New York Yankees (Note: Compensation pick for the Washington Nationals signing Rafael Soriano)	Left-handed pitcher	James Madison High School (CA)

=== Competitive balance round A ===
Pick	Player	Team	Position	School
34	Sean Manaea	Kansas City Royals	Left-handed pitcher	Indiana State
35	Matt Krook*	Miami Marlins (Note: The Marlins acquired the 35th overall selection, and Gorkys Hernández from the Pirates in exchange for Gaby Sánchez, and Kyle Kaminska on July 31, 2012.)	Left-handed pitcher	St. Ignatius College Prep (CA)
36	Aaron Blair	Arizona Diamondbacks	Right-handed pitcher	Marshall
37	Josh Hart	Baltimore Orioles	Outfielder	Parkview High School (GA)
38	Michael Lorenzen	Cincinnati Reds	Right-handed pitcher	Cal State Fullerton
39	Corey Knebel	Detroit Tigers (Note: The Tigers acquired the 39th overall pick, Aníbal Sánchez, and Omar Infante from the Marlins in exchange for Brian Flynn, Rob Brantly, and Jacob Turner on July 23, 2012.)	Right-handed pitcher	Texas

== Other notable selections ==
Round	Pick	Player	Team	Position	School
2	40	Andrew Thurman	Houston Astros	Right-handed pitcher	UC Irvine
2	41	Rob Zastryzny	Chicago Cubs	Left-handed pitcher	Missouri
2	42	Ryan McMahon	Colorado Rockies	Third baseman	Mater Dei High School (CA)
2	43	Ryan Eades	Minnesota Twins	Right-handed pitcher	LSU
2	44	Trevor Williams	Miami Marlins	Right-handed pitcher	Arizona State
2	46	Cody Reed	Kansas City Royals	Left-handed pitcher	Northwest Mississippi Community College
2	50	Dustin Peterson	San Diego Padres	Shortstop	Gilbert High School (AZ)
2	52	Justin Williams	Arizona Diamondbacks	Shortstop	Terrebonne High School (LA)
2	53	Andrew Knapp	Philadelphia Phillies	Catcher	California
2	54	Devin Williams	Milwaukee Brewers	Right-handed pitcher	Hazelwood West High School (MO)
2	55	Tyler Danish	Chicago White Sox	Right-handed pitcher	Durant High School (FL)
2	57	Oscar Mercado	St. Louis Cardinals	Shortstop	Gaither High School (FL)
2	61	Chance Sisco	Baltimore Orioles	Catcher	Santiago High School (CA)
2	62	Akeem Bostick	Texas Rangers	Right-handed pitcher	West Florence High School (SC)
2	63	Dillon Overton	Oakland Athletics	Left-handed pitcher	Oklahoma
2	64	Ryder Jones	San Francisco Giants	Third baseman	Watauga High School (NC)
2	65	Víctor Caratini	Atlanta Braves	Catcher	Miami Dade College
2	71	Chad Pinder	Oakland Athletics	Shortstop	Virginia Tech
2	73	Colby Suggs	Miami Marlins	Right-handed pitcher	Arkansas
3	75	Jacob Hannemann	Chicago Cubs	Outfielder	Brigham Young
3	77	Sam Moll	Colorado Rockies	Left-handed pitcher	Memphis
3	78	Stuart Turner	Minnesota Twins	Catcher	Ole Miss
3	80	Ben DeLuzio*	Miami Marlins	Shortstop	The First Academy (FL)
3	83	Patrick Murphy	Toronto Blue Jays	Right-handed pitcher	Hamilton High School (AZ)
3	85	Tyler O'Neill	Seattle Mariners	Outfielder	Garibaldi Secondary School (BC)
3	87	JaCoby Jones	Pittsburgh Pirates	Outfielder	LSU
3	88	Daniel Palka	Arizona Diamondbacks	First baseman	Georgia Tech
3	89	Cord Sandberg	Philadelphia Phillies	Outfielder	Manatee High School (FL)
3	90	Barrett Astin	Milwaukee Brewers	Right-handed pitcher	Arkansas
3	91	Jacob May	Chicago White Sox	Outfielder	Coastal Carolina
3	92	Brandon Dixon	Los Angeles Dodgers	Third baseman	Arizona
3	93	Mike Mayers	St. Louis Cardinals	Right-handed pitcher	Ole Miss
3	95	Keynan Middleton	Los Angeles Angels	Right-handed pitcher	Lane Community College
3	98	Stephen Tarpley	Baltimore Orioles	Left-handed pitcher	Scottsdale Community College
3	100	Ryon Healy	Oakland Athletics	First baseman	Oregon
4	109	Jordan Patterson	Colorado Rockies	Outfielder	South Alabama
4	110	Stephen Gonsalves	Minnesota Twins	Left-handed pitcher	Cathedral Catholic High School (CA)
4	111	Kyle Crockett	Cleveland Indians	Left-handed pitcher	Virginia
4	116	L. J. Mazzilli	New York Mets	Second baseman	Connecticut
4	122	Taylor Williams	Milwaukee Brewers	Right-handed pitcher	Kent State
4	124	Cody Bellinger	Los Angeles Dodgers	First baseman/outfielder	Hamilton High School (AZ)
4	128	Kean Wong	Tampa Bay Rays	Second baseman	Waiakea High School (HI)
4	129	Jonah Heim	Baltimore Orioles	Catcher	Amherst Central High School (NY)
4	130	Isiah Kiner-Falefa	Texas Rangers	Shortstop	Mid-Pacific Institute (HI)
4	131	Dylan Covey	Oakland Athletics	Right-handed pitcher	San Diego
4	134	Tyler Wade	New York Yankees	Shortstop	Murrieta Valley High School (CA)
4	135	Ben Lively	Cincinnati Reds	Right-handed pitcher	UCF
4	136	Nick Pivetta	Washington Nationals	Right-handed pitcher	New Mexico Junior College
5	137	Tony Kemp	Houston Astros	Second baseman	Vanderbilt
5	140	Aaron Slegers	Minnesota Twins	Right-handed pitcher	Indiana
5	142	Chad Wallach	Miami Marlins	Catcher	Cal State Fullerton
5	143	Corey Littrell	Boston Red Sox	Left-handed pitcher	Kentucky
5	147	Jack Reinheimer	Seattle Mariners	Shortstop	East Carolina
5	156	Buck Farmer	Detroit Tigers	Right-handed pitcher	Georgia Tech
5	157	Kyle McGowin	Los Angeles Angels	Right-handed pitcher	Savannah State
5	158	Johnny Field	Tampa Bay Rays	Second baseman	Arizona
5	161	Bobby Wahl	Oakland Athletics	Right-handed pitcher	Ole Miss
5	162	Dan Slania	San Francisco Giants	Right-handed pitcher	Notre Dame
5	166	Austin Voth	Washington Nationals	Right-handed pitcher	Washington
6	167	Jacob Nottingham	Houston Astros	Catcher	Redlands High School (CA)
6	169	Dom Núñez	Colorado Rockies	Third baseman	Elk Grove High School (CA)
6	170	Brian Navarreto	Minnesota Twins	Catcher	Arlington Country Day School (FL)
6	174	Luke Farrell	Kansas City Royals	Right-handed pitcher	Northwestern
6	175	Matthew Boyd	Toronto Blue Jays	Left-handed pitcher	Oregon State
6	178	Trevor Gott	San Diego Padres	Right-handed pitcher	Kentucky
6	179	Adam Frazier	Pittsburgh Pirates	Shortstop	Mississippi State
6	182	Garrett Cooper	Milwaukee Brewers	First baseman	Auburn
6	184	Jacob Rhame	Los Angeles Dodgers	Right-handed pitcher	Grayson College
6	190	Sam Wolff	Texas Rangers	Right-handed pitcher	New Mexico
6	191	Kyle Finnegan	Oakland Athletics	Right-handed pitcher	Texas State
6	195	Zack Weiss	Cincinnati Reds	Right-handed pitcher	UCLA
7	204	Kyle Bartsch	Kansas City Royals	Left-handed pitcher	South Alabama
7	205	Conner Greene	Toronto Blue Jays	Right-handed pitcher	Santa Monica High School (CA)
7	207	Tyler Olson	Seattle Mariners	Left-handed pitcher	Gonzaga
7	208	Jake Bauers	San Diego Padres	First baseman	Marina High School (CA)
7	220	Nick Gardewine	Texas Rangers	Right-handed pitcher	Kaskaskia College
7	224	Nick Rumbelow	New York Yankees	Right-handed pitcher	LSU
7	225	Tyler Mahle	Cincinnati Reds	Right-handed pitcher	Westminster High School (CA)
8	235	Kendall Graveman	Toronto Blue Jays	Right-handed pitcher	Mississippi State
8	237	Tyler Smith	Seattle Mariners	Shortstop	Oregon State
8	240	Brad Keller	Arizona Diamondbacks	Right-handed pitcher	Flowery Branch High School (GA)
8	244	Kyle Farmer	Los Angeles Dodgers	Catcher	Georgia
8	246	Zac Reininger	Detroit Tigers	Right-handed pitcher	Hill College
8	247	Nate Smith	Los Angeles Angels	Left-handed pitcher	Furman
8	248	Roel Ramírez	Tampa Bay Rays	Pitcher	United South High School (TX)
8	249	Trey Mancini	Baltimore Orioles	First baseman	Notre Dame
8	253	Kyle Wren	Atlanta Braves	Outfielder	Georgia Tech
9	259	Pat Valaika	Colorado Rockies	Shortstop	UCLA
9	260	Mitch Garver	Minnesota Twins	Catcher	New Mexico
9	261	Thomas Pannone	Cleveland Indians	Left-handed pitcher	College of Southern Nevada
9	263	Kyle Martin	Boston Red Sox	Right-handed pitcher	Texas A&M
9	265	Chad Girodo	Toronto Blue Jays	Left-handed pitcher	Mississippi State
9	269	Chad Kuhl	Pittsburgh Pirates	Right-handed pitcher	Delaware
9	278	Austin Pruitt	Tampa Bay Rays	Right-handed pitcher	Houston
10	288	Zack Godley	Chicago Cubs	Right-handed pitcher	Tennessee
10	289	Mike Tauchman	Colorado Rockies	Outfielder	Bradley
10	296	Luis Guillorme	New York Mets	Shortstop	Coral Springs Charter School (FL)
10	297	Emilio Pagán	Seattle Mariners	Right-handed pitcher	Belmont Abbey College
10	299	Shane Carle	Pittsburgh Pirates	Right-handed pitcher	Long Beach State
10	300	Jimmie Sherfy	Arizona Diamondbacks	Right-handed pitcher	Oregon
10	303	Brad Goldberg	Chicago White Sox	Right-handed pitcher	Ohio State
10	309	Austin Wynns	Baltimore Orioles	Catcher	Fresno State
10	312	Tyler Rogers	San Francisco Giants	Right-handed pitcher	Austin Peay
10	314	Tyler Webb	New York Yankees	Left-handed pitcher	South Carolina
10	315	Daniel Wright	Cincinnati Reds	Right-handed pitcher	Arkansas State
11	321	Adam Plutko	Cleveland Indians	Right-handed pitcher	UCLA
11	323	Carlos Asuaje	Boston Red Sox	Shortstop	Nova Southeastern
11	336	Chad Green	Detroit Tigers	Right-handed pitcher	Louisville
11	339	Steven Brault	Baltimore Orioles	Left-handed pitcher	Regis
11	341	Lou Trivino	Oakland Athletics	Right-handed pitcher	Slippery Rock (PA)
12	355	Tim Mayza	Toronto Blue Jays	Left-handed pitcher	Millersville University of Pennsylvania
12	356	Jeff McNeil	New York Mets	Second baseman	Long Beach State
13	382	J. T. Riddle	Miami Marlins	Second baseman	Kentucky
13	399	Jimmy Yacabonis	Baltimore Orioles	Right-handed pitcher	Saint Joseph's
14	410	Zack Granite	Minnesota Twins	Outfielder	Seton Hall
14	420	Steve Hathaway	Arizona Diamondbacks	Left-handed pitcher	Franklin Pierce University
14	428	Jaime Schultz	Tampa Bay Rays	Right-handed pitcher	High Point
14	429	Mike Yastrzemski	Baltimore Orioles	Outfielder	Vanderbilt
14	434	Caleb Smith	New York Yankees	Left-handed pitcher	Sam Houston State
15	437	James Farris*	Houston Astros	Right-handed pitcher	Arizona
15	460	Cody Ege	Texas Rangers	Left-handed pitcher	Louisville
15	463	Matt Marksberry	Atlanta Braves	Left-handed pitcher	Campbell
16	472	Tyler Kinley	Miami Marlins	Right-handed pitcher	Barry University
16	474	Kevin McCarthy	Kansas City Royals	Right-handed pitcher	Marist
16	475	Danny Jansen	Toronto Blue Jays	Catcher	Appleton West High School (WI)
17	507	Paul Fry	Seattle Mariners	Left-handed pitcher	St. Clair County Community College
17	521	Jaycob Brugman	Oakland Athletics	Outfielder	Brigham Young
18	554	Dustin Fowler	New York Yankees	Outfielder	West Laurens High School (GA)
19	558	Will Remillard	Chicago Cubs	Catcher	Coastal Carolina
19	573	Adam Engel	Chicago White Sox	Outfielder	Louisville
20	594	Glenn Sparkman	Kansas City Royals	Right-handed pitcher	Wharton County Junior College
22	651	Ben Heller	Cleveland Indians	Right-handed pitcher	Olivet Nazarene University
22	661	Mark Leiter Jr.	Philadelphia Phillies	Right-handed pitcher	NJIT
22	662	Johnny Davis	Milwaukee Brewers	Outfielder	West Los Angeles College
22	665	Luke Voit	St. Louis Cardinals	Catcher	Missouri State
22	675	Layne Somsen	Cincinnati Reds	Right-handed pitcher	South Dakota State
23	699	Stefan Crichton	Baltimore Orioles	Right-handed pitcher	Texas Christian University
24	716	Matt Brill*	New York Mets	Right-handed pitcher	Moline High School (IL)
24	724	José De León	Los Angeles Dodgers	Right-handed pitcher	Southern
25	757	Alan Busenitz	Los Angeles Angels	Right-handed pitcher	Kennesaw State
26	773	Mauricio Dubon	Boston Red Sox	Outfielder	Capital Christian High School (CA)
27	816	Joe Mantiply	Detroit Tigers	Left-handed pitcher	Virginia Tech
27	819	Donnie Hart	Baltimore Orioles	Left-handed pitcher	Texas State
28	835	Matt Dermody	Toronto Blue Jays	Left-handed pitcher	Iowa
28	852	Dusten Knight	San Francisco Giants	Right-handed pitcher	Texas–Pan American
29	871	Cavan Biggio*	Philadelphia Phillies	Shortstop	St. Thomas High School (TX)
29	878	Hunter Wood	Tampa Bay Rays	Right-handed pitcher	Howard College
30	895	Rowdy Tellez	Toronto Blue Jays	First baseman	Elk Grove High School (CA)
30	910	Joe Palumbo	Texas Rangers	Left-handed pitcher	St. John the Baptist Diocesan High School (NY)
31	945	Andrew Benintendi*	Cincinnati Reds	Outfielder	Madeira High School (OH)
32	954	Mike Shawaryn*	Kansas City Royals	Right-handed pitcher	Gloucester Catholic High School (NJ)
33	977	Tyler White	Houston Astros	Third baseman	Western Carolina
33	991	Harrison Musgrave*	Philadelphia Phillies	Left-handed pitcher	West Virginia
35	1,037	Kacy Clemens*	Houston Astros	Right-handed pitcher	Memorial High School (TX)
35	1,056	A. J. Puk*	Detroit Tigers	Left-handed pitcher	Washington High School (IA)
36	1,095	Taylor Hearn*	Cincinnati Reds	Left-handed pitcher	San Jacinto College
36	1,094	Nestor Cortés Jr.	New York Yankees	Left-handed pitcher	Hialeah Senior High School (FL)
37	1,114	Justin Dunn*	Los Angeles Dodgers	Right-handed pitcher	The Gunnery (CT)
38	1,129	Scott Moss*	Colorado Rockies	Left-handed pitcher	DeLand High School (FL)
40	1,216	Shaun Anderson*	Washington Nationals	Right-handed pitcher	American Heritage School (FL)

== Notes ==
Compensation picks

Traded picks

== NCAA investigation ==
The Philadelphia Phillies selected college juniors Ben Wetzler of Oregon State University in the fifth round and Jason Monda of Washington State University in the sixth round of the draft. Both entered into negotiations with the Phillies with the help of a financial adviser, which is against National Collegiate Athletic Association rules. Both also chose to return to college for their senior year. The Phillies reported Wetzler and Monda to the NCAA, which cleared Monda and suspended Wetzler for the first 11 games of the college season.

== Player notes ==
Kyle Crockett, the Cleveland Indians fourth round pick out of the University of Virginia, was promoted to the Indians on May 16, 2014. This made Crockett the first 2013 draftee to reach the major leagues.

Marco Gonzales, the St. Louis Cardinals' first round pick, made his MLB debut on June 25, 2014. This made Gonzales the first 2013 first round pick to reach the major leagues.

Nate Orf, who went undrafted out of Baylor University in 2013, signed with the Milwaukee Brewers for $500 and worked his way up through their farm system, making his MLB debut with them on July 2, 2018. His first hit two days later turned out to be the game-winning home run and he was carried back out by his teammates for a curtain call.

== See also ==
- List of first overall Major League Baseball draft picks
