= Cord Sandberg =

American football and baseball player (born 1995)

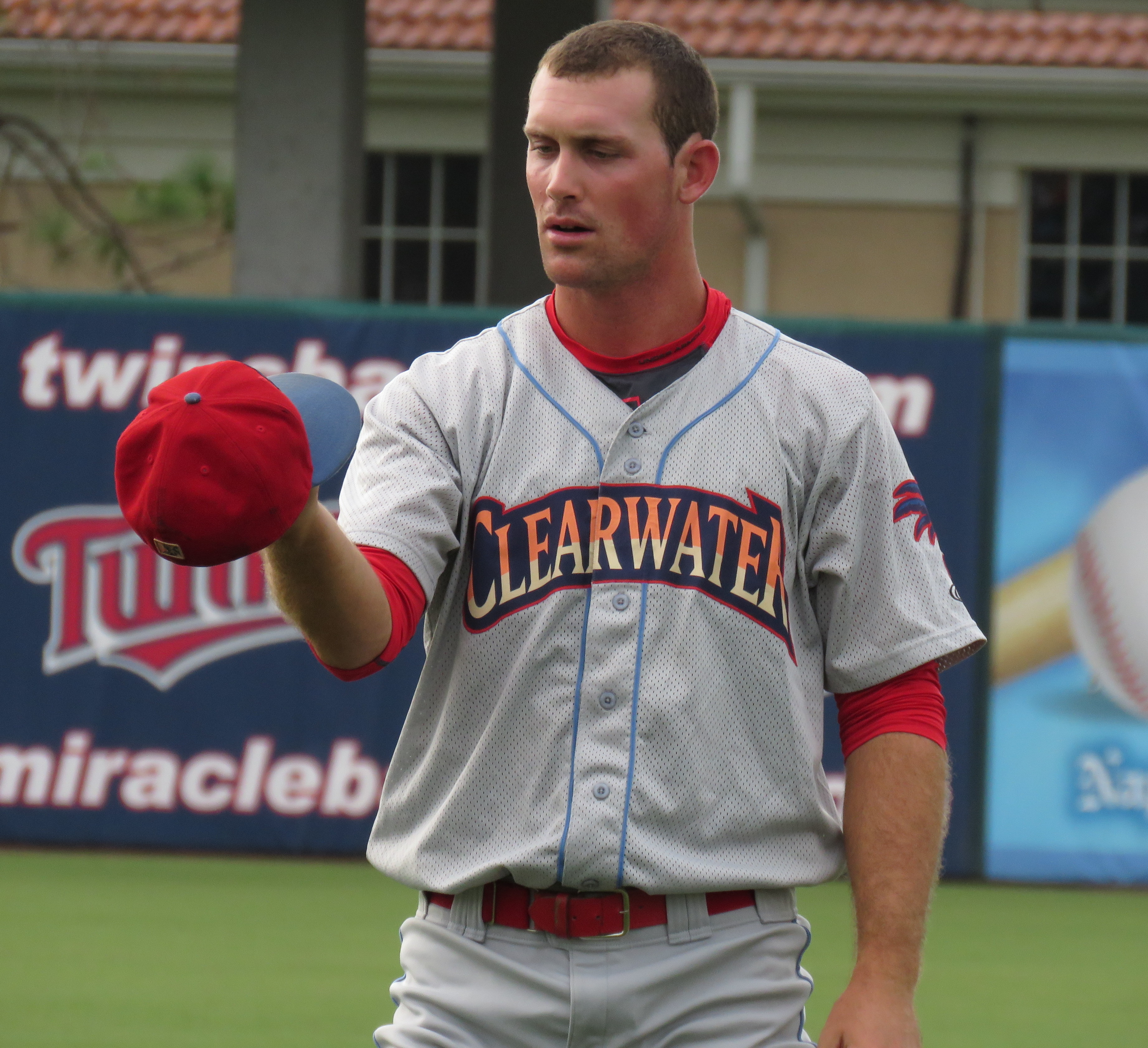

Profile
- Position: Wide receiver

Personal information
- Born: January 2, 1995 (age 31); Bradenton, Florida, U.S.
- Listed height: 6 ft 3 in (1.91 m)
- Listed weight: 215 lb (98 kg)

Career information
- High school: Manatee (Bradenton, Florida)
- College: Auburn (2018–2021); EKU (2021)

Cord Sandberg
- Outfielder
- Born: January 2, 1995 (age 31); Bradenton, Florida, U.S.
- Bats: Left Throws: Left
- Stats at Baseball Reference

Cord William Sandberg (born January 2, 1995) is an American former football wide receiver and professional baseball outfielder. He played Minor League Baseball in the Philadelphia Phillies organization.

== Early life ==
Sandberg played on the varsity baseball team at Manatee High School for four years, and participated in the 2012 Perfect Game USA, one of the most selective baseball recruiting organizations for high schoolers. Sandberg was also a football star, and was a dual threat quarterback for his entire high school career. He committed to attend Mississippi State University on a scholarship to play college football for the Mississippi State Bulldogs, but was expected to be a high draft pick in the 2013 MLB draft.

== Baseball career ==
The Philadelphia Phillies selected Sandberg with the 89th pick in the third round of the 2013 Major League Baseball draft. He signed and spent 2013 with the Gulf Coast League Phillies, where he batted .207 with two home runs and 14 RBI in 48 games. Sandberg spent 2014 with the Williamsport Crosscutters where he slashed .235/.267/345 with six home runs and 24 RBI in 66 games, 2015 with the Lakewood BlueClaws where he compiled a .255 batting average with five home runs and 59 RBI in 129 games, and 2016 with the Clearwater Threshers where he posted a .230 batting average with four home runs and 23 RBI in 94 games. In 2017, Sandberg played for Lakewood, Clearwater, and the Reading Fightin Phils where he batted a combined .268 with nine home runs and 42 RBI in 105 total games between the three affiliates.

== Personal life ==
Sandberg's father, Chuck, is a former baseball player for the University of Florida and the Boston Red Sox organization.

== Football career ==
Sandberg committed to the Auburn Tigers July 30, 2018 to play quarterback.

He saw limited game action during his time with the program, appearing primarily as a backup behind Bo Nix. Sandberg first played in 2018 against Alabama State, where he recorded his first collegiate pass and rushing attempts. In 2019, he appeared in 2 games, most notably against Samford, completing 5 of 7 passes for 84 yards and 2 touchdowns. He also saw action against Kent State that season. In 2020, Sandberg appeared in 1 game, completing 1 pass for 8 yards. Overall, he served mainly as a depth quarterback before transferring following the 2020 season.
