= Will Dissly =

American football player (born 1996)

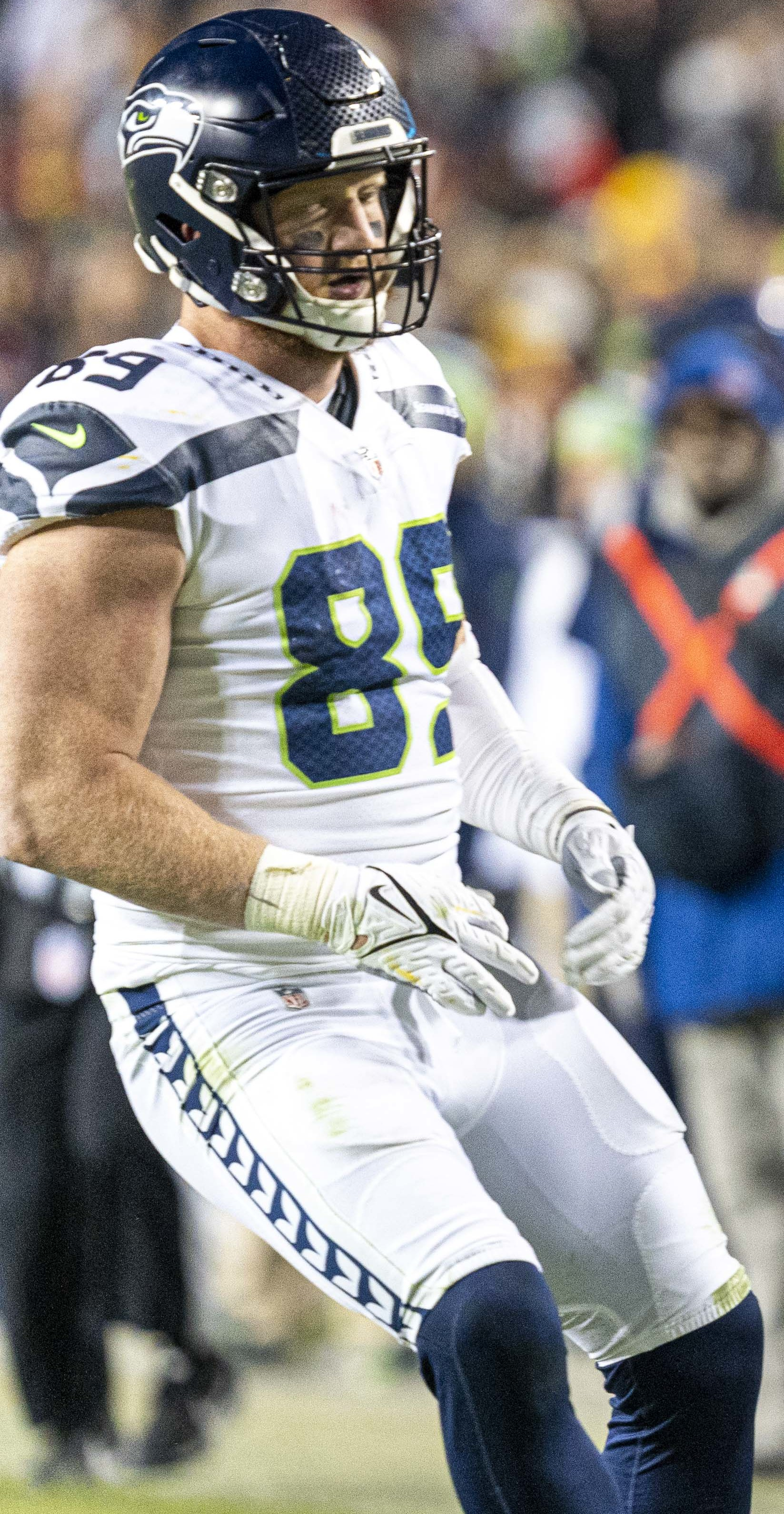
- Dissly with the Seattle Seahawks in 2021

Profile
- Position: Tight end

Personal information
- Born: July 8, 1996 (age 30); Bozeman, Montana, U.S.
- Listed height: 6 ft 4 in (1.93 m)
- Listed weight: 265 lb (120 kg)

Career information
- High school: Bozeman
- College: Washington (2014–2017)
- NFL draft: 2018: 4th round, 120th overall pick

Career history
- Seattle Seahawks (2018–2023); Los Angeles Chargers (2024–2025)

Awards and highlights
- Second-team All-Pac-12 (2017)

Career NFL statistics as of 2025
- Receptions: 188
- Receiving yards: 1,999
- Receiving touchdowns: 15
- Stats at Pro Football Reference

Will Dissly (born July 8, 1996) is an American professional football tight end. He played college football for the Washington Huskies and was selected by the Seattle Seahawks of the National Football League. Dissly was Montana's Gatorade High School Player of the Year in 2013.

== Early life ==
Born and raised in Bozeman, Montana, Dissly graduated from Bozeman High School in 2014. During his senior year, the Bozeman Hawks football team won the state championship. He played on both sides of the ball, recording 57 tackles and 11 receiving touchdowns while being named Montana's Gatorade High School Player of the Year. He originally committed to Boise State in December, but then followed head coach Chris Petersen to Seattle to play at Washington.

== College career ==
After his sophomore season at Washington in 2015, Dissly transitioned from defensive end to tight end. His first reception, against Sacramento State, went for a 27-yard touchdown. After garnering only four receptions as a junior, Dissly had 21 catches as a senior in 2017. Most reports projected him as a blocking tight end.

== Professional career ==
Pre-draft measurables
Height	Weight	Arm length	Hand span	Wingspan	40-yard dash	10-yard split	20-yard split	20-yard shuttle	Three-cone drill	Vertical jump	Broad jump	Bench press
6 ft 3 3/4 in (1.92 m)	262 lb (119 kg)	33 1/4 in (0.84 m)	9 3/4 in (0.25 m)	6 ft 7 1/4 in (2.01 m)	4.87 s	1.69 s	2.86 s	4.40 s	7.07 s	31.0 in (0.79 m)	9 ft 3 in (2.82 m)	15 reps
All values from NFL Combine/Pro Day

=== Seattle Seahawks ===
Dissly was selected by the Seattle Seahawks in the fourth round (120th overall) of the 2018 NFL draft. He quickly became a trusted target of quarterback Russell Wilson. In the season-opening 27–24 loss to the Denver Broncos, Dissly had three receptions for 105 yards and his first professional touchdown in his NFL debut. He followed that up with three receptions for 42 yards and another touchdown in the Monday Night Football loss to the Chicago Bears in Week 2. During Week 4 against the Cardinals in Arizona, Dissly was carted off the field with 7:52 left in the first quarter after a tackle by Cardinals' safety Antoine Bethea. Although the catch resulted in a 5-yard gain, Dissly's rookie season was cut short after suffering a patellar tendon injury, the same injury that had affected Jimmy Graham in 2015.

In Week 2 of the 2019 season against the Pittsburgh Steelers, Dissly caught five passes for 50 yards and two touchdowns as the Seahawks won 28–26. In Week 3 against the New Orleans Saints, Dissly caught 6 passes for 62 yards and a touchdown as time expired in the 33–27 loss. In a Week 6 game against the Cleveland Browns, left the game with an Achilles injury. He was later diagnosed with a torn Achilles and was placed on season-ending injured reserve on October 19, 2019.

On March 14, 2022, Dissly signed a three-year $24 million contract extension with the Seahawks. In Week 8, Dissly had a forced fumble and a fumble recovery on special teams in a 27–13 win over the New York Giants, earning National Football Conference Special Teams Player of the Week. He finished the season with a career-high 34 catches for 349 yards and three touchdowns through 15 starts.

In the 2023 season, Dissly had 17 receptions for 172 yards and one touchdown in 16 games.

On March 5, 2024, Dissly was released by the Seahawks in a cap-saving effort.

=== Los Angeles Chargers ===
On March 13, 2024, Dissly signed a three-year, $14 million contract with the Los Angeles Chargers.

On March 4, 2026, Dissly was released by the Chargers.

== NFL career statistics ==
Legend
**Bold**	Career high

=== Regular season ===
Year	Team	Games		Receiving					Rushing					Fumbles	
Year	Team	GP	GS	Rec	Yds	Avg	Lng	TD	Att	Yds	Avg	Lng	TD	Fum	Lost
2018	SEA	4	4	8	156	**19.5**	**66**	2	0	0	0	0	0	0	0
2019	SEA	6	6	23	262	11.4	38	**4**	**1**	**7**	**7.0**	**7**	0	**1**	0
2020	SEA	**16**	12	24	251	10.5	28	2	0	0	0	0	0	0	0
2021	SEA	15	14	21	231	11.0	39	1	0	0	0	0	0	**1**	0
2022	SEA	15	**15**	34	349	10.3	38	3	0	0	0	0	0	0	0
2023	SEA	**16**	14	17	172	10.1	21	1	0	0	0	0	0	0	0
2024	LAC	15	8	**50**	**481**	9.6	29	2	0	0	0	0	0	0	0
2025	LAC	3	1	4	43	10.8	18	0	0	0	0	0	0	0	0
Career		90	74	181	1,945	10.7	66	15	1	7	7.0	7	0	2	0

=== Postseason ===
Year	Team	Games		Receiving					Fumbles	
Year	Team	GP	GS	Rec	Yds	Avg	Lng	TD	Fum	Lost
2020	SEA	**1**	0	1	1	1.0	1	0	0	0
2024	LAC	**1**	**1**	**2**	**16**	**8.0**	**9**	0	0	0
Career		2	1	3	17	5.7	9	0	0	0
