= Tatiana Prowell =

American medical oncologist specializing in breast cancer

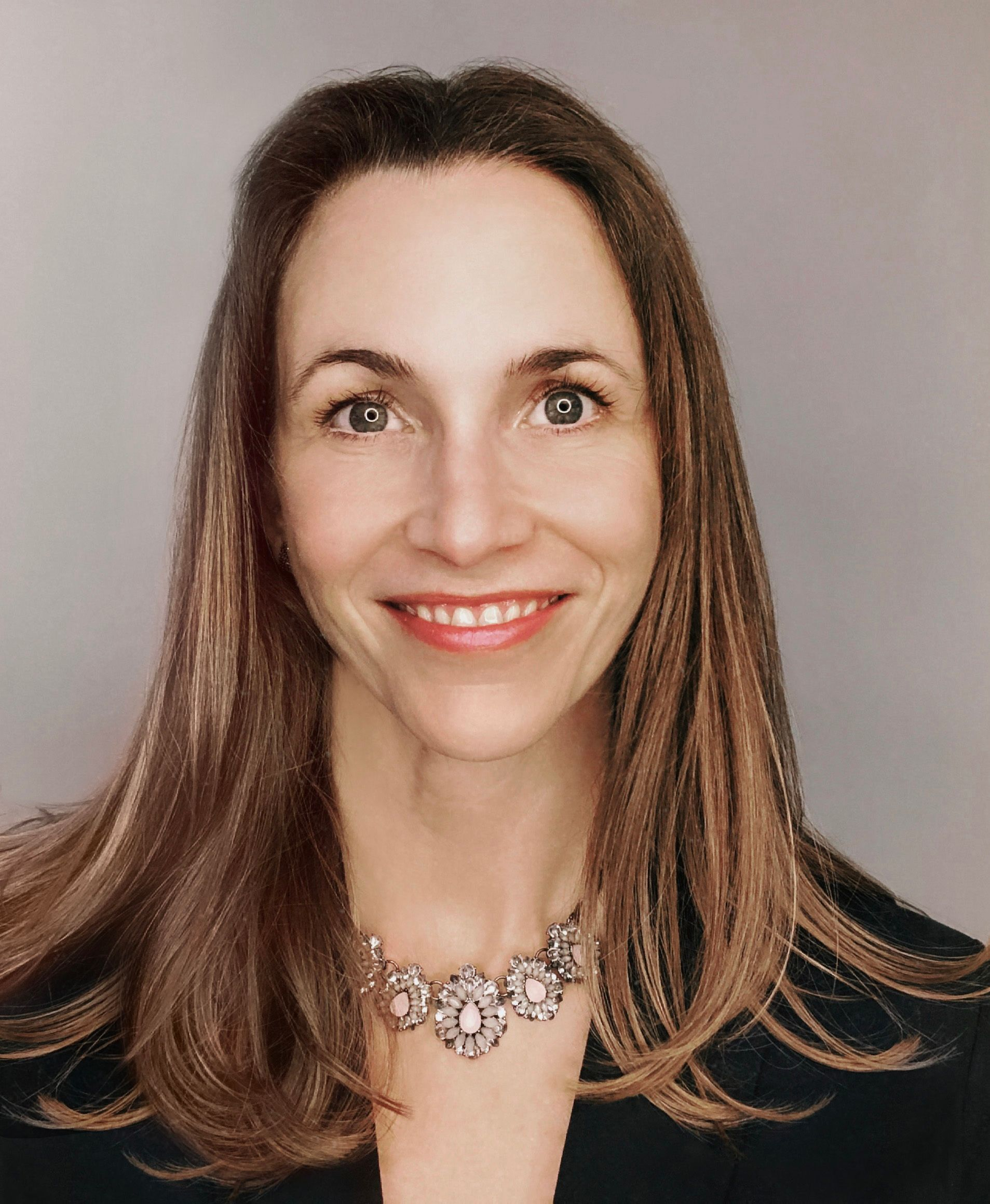
- Born: Atlanta, Georgia, USA
- Spouse: Todd Gleeson (m. 2002)
- Children: 3

Academic background
- Education: B.A., literature and language, 1994, Bard College; M.D., 1999, Johns Hopkins University School of Medicine

Academic work
- Institutions: Johns Hopkins University School of Medicine

Tatiana Michelle Prowell is an American medical oncologist specializing in breast cancer. She is an Associate Professor of Oncology at Johns Hopkins School of Medicine and Breast Cancer Scientific Liaison at the U.S. Food & Drug Administration.

== Early life and education ==
Prowell grew up in Atlanta, Georgia, Her father was a federal employee working for the U.S. Geological Survey and her mother a homemaker. She attended Parkview High School for her secondary school education.

Prowell completed a Bachelor of Arts degree in literature at Bard College, where she was encouraged by her academic advisor, Clark Rodewald, to pursue a medical career. After a year working with Nobel Laureate D. Carleton Gajdusek in his NIH Laboratory of Central Nervous System Studies, where she conducted basic science research in spongiform encephalopathies and served as the editor of several years of Gajdusek's personal diaries housed in the National Library of Medicine, she was accepted into the Johns Hopkins School of Medicine. She graduated in 1999 with a medical degree and election to the Phi Beta Kappa and Alpha Omega Alpha honor societies.

== Career ==
Prowell completed an internal medicine residency in the Osler Housestaff Training Program and medical oncology fellowship at the Sidney Kimmel Comprehensive Cancer Center, both at Johns Hopkins. In 2006, Prowell was recruited by Richard Pazdur to the U.S. Food & Drug Administration (FDA). She has held joint appointments since that time at Johns Hopkins University School of Medicine where she is an Associate Professor of Oncology and at the FDA where she serves as Breast Cancer Scientific Liaison.

In 2012, Prowell and Pazdur co-published new FDA guidelines which would allow non-approved drugs to be tested on highly aggressive types of breast cancer before women underwent surgery, with the disappearance of all cancer after treatment in the pathological specimen, known as pathological compete response, to be used as a potential basis for regulatory approval. She played a key role in developing FDA’s policy on accelerated approval using pathological complete response as a novel regulatory endpoint in the neoadjuvant high-risk breast cancer setting. Similar policies were subsequently adopted by other global regulatory agencies. Relevant articles include "Residual Disease after Neoadjuvant Therapy — Developing Drugs for High-Risk Early Breast Cancer" and "Pathological Complete Response and Accelerated Drug Approval in Early Breast Cancer".

In 2014, Prowell began advocating for routine inclusion of male patients with breast cancer in clinical trials. By 2021, the FDA reported that the majority of breast cancer clinical trials now permit male patients to enroll and that recent drug approvals in breast cancer have been granted regardless of sex.

Prowell was appointed in 2016 by Elizabeth Jaffee to the Biden Cancer Moonshot Blue Ribbon Panel Cancer Immunology Working Group.

In 2017, Prowell and colleagues called for further modernization of eligibility criteria to improve patient access to clinical trials of investigational cancer treatments and to ensure that enrolled populations are representative of patients likely to receive these treatments in the postmarket setting. Prowell has been a particular advocate for inclusion of patients with brain metastases in clinical trials given the prevalence of the condition and their high degree of unmet medical need. NCI Cancer Therapy Evaluation Program (CTEP) subsequently announced that the updated eligibility criteria were mandatory for use in all CTEP-sponsored clinical trials. Following widespread adoption of these criteria, multiple drugs have demonstrated effectiveness against brain metastases.

Prowell and Don Dizon have called upon the field of medicine to abandon language that dehumanizes patients. While serving as Chair of the American Society of Clinical Oncology's 2020 Annual Meeting Education Committee, Prowell co-authored The Language of Respect document intended to address these issues as well as mitigate unconscious gender and racial bias in speaker introductions at conferences. By 2022, the Language of Respect guidelines had been translated into five languages and adapted for use by 17 professional societies.

Prowell rose to prominence on Twitter during the COVID-19 pandemic as a reliable source of medical news and public health commentary. In March 2020, she tweeted seeking a convalescent plasma donor for a physician family member who was critically ill with COVID-19. The tweet led to an outpouring of messages from thousands of prospective convalescent plasma donors, as well as others also seeking plasma for their own family members. Prowell worked to connect potential donors and recipients to donation centers throughout the U.S. before the U.S. Food and Drug Administration and the American Red Cross set up a convalescent plasma donation program. By April 10, 2020, The Atlantic journalist Sarah Zhang reported that 20,000 potential donors reached out to Mount Sinai Hospital. Prowell's tweet and subsequent efforts earned her a Webby Special Achievement in May 2020 for "her use of the Internet to organize a blood drive and to inspire COVID-19 survivors to donate their plasma to those still in the fight to recover."

In December 2020, Angela Weyand and Prowell co-founded Healthcare Workers Vs. Hunger, a volunteer-led, weeklong annual contest between teams of health care workers on Twitter (#HCWvsHunger) to address food insecurity during the COVID-19 pandemic and improve the morale of healthcare workers. As of December 2024, https://hcwvshunger.org has raised more than 3.1 million dollars for food banks and hunger organizations.

== Selected publications ==
- Cortazar P, Zhang L, Untch M, Mehta K, Costantino JP, Wolmark N, Bonnefoi H, Cameron D, Gianni L, Valagussa P, Swain SM, Prowell T, Loibl S, Wickerham DL, Bogaerts J, Baselga J, Perou C, Blumenthal G, Blohmer J, Mamounas EP, Bergh J, Semiglazov V, Justice R, Eidtmann H, Paik S, Piccart M, Sridhara R, Fasching PA, Slaets L, Tang S, Gerber B, Geyer CE, Pazdur R, Ditsch N, Rastogi P, Eiermann W, von Minckwitz G (July 2014). "Pathological complete response and long-term clinical benefit in breast cancer: the CTNeoBC pooled analysis". The Lancet. 384 (9938): 164–172. doi:10.1016/S0140-6736(13)62422-8. PMID 24529560. S2CID 116077931.
- Prowell TM, Pazdur R (2012-06-28). "Pathological Complete Response and Accelerated Drug Approval in Early Breast Cancer". New England Journal of Medicine. 366 (26): 2438–2441. doi:10.1056/NEJMp1205737. PMID 22646508.
- Prowell TM, Theoret MR, Pazdur R (2016-04-13). "Seamless Oncology-Drug Development". New England Journal of Medicine. 374 (21): 2001–2003. doi:10.1056/nejmp1603747. PMID 27074059.

== Awards and honours ==
Prowell was the recipient of an American Society of Clinical Oncology Young Investigator Award and two Pearl M. Stetler awards for women in medicine. In 2019, she received the John and Samuel Bard Award in Science or Medicine for her contributions to the field of oncology. Prowell was also recognized as one of the 100 Influential Women in Oncology by OncoDaily. She received the 2025 AMWA Inspire Award from the American Medical Women's Association.

== Personal life ==
In 2004 she married Todd Gleeson, an HIV specialist.
