= Chris Carson =

American football player (born 1994)

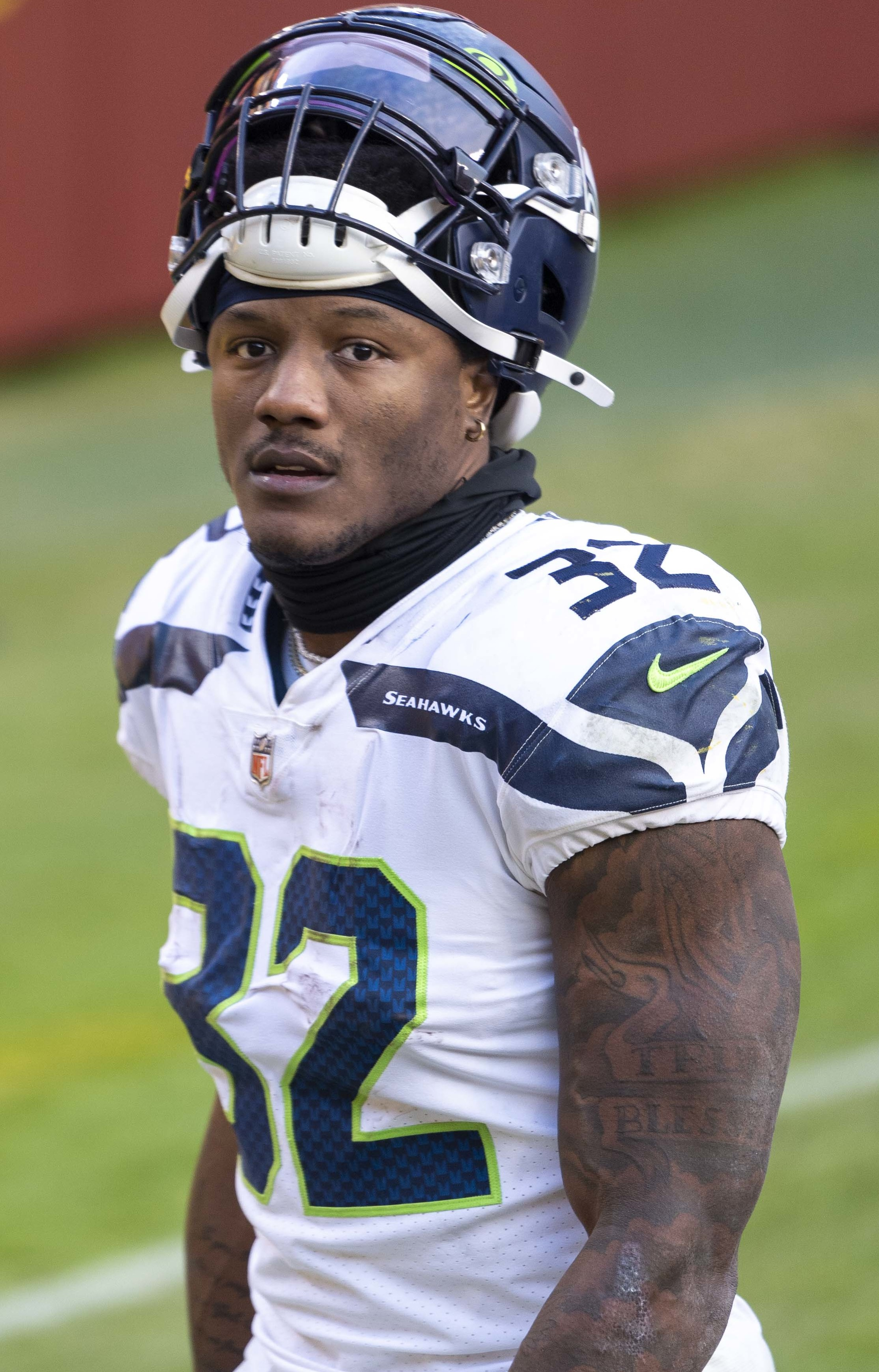
- Carson with the Seattle Seahawks in 2020

No. 32
- Position: Running back

Personal information
- Born: September 16, 1994 (age 32); Biloxi, Mississippi, U.S.
- Listed height: 5 ft 11 in (1.80 m)
- Listed weight: 222 lb (101 kg)

Career information
- High school: Parkview (Lilburn, Georgia)
- College: Butler CC (2013–2014); Oklahoma State (2015–2016)
- NFL draft: 2017: 7th round, 249th overall pick

Career history
- Seattle Seahawks (2017–2021)

Career NFL statistics
- Rushing yards: 3,502
- Rushing average: 4.6
- Rushing touchdowns: 24
- Receptions: 107
- Receiving yards: 804
- Receiving touchdowns: 7
- Stats at Pro Football Reference

Christopher Dewayne Carson (born September 16, 1994) is an American former professional football player who was a running back for five seasons with the Seattle Seahawks of the National Football League (NFL). He played college football at Butler Community College before transferring to the Oklahoma State Cowboys program in 2016. A neck injury during the 2021 NFL season prematurely ended his career.

== Early life ==
Born in Biloxi, Mississippi, Chris Carson grew up in Lilburn, Georgia, and played high school football at its Parkview High School. He received numerous offers before committing to Oklahoma State.

== College career ==
Carson played two seasons for Butler Community College in El Dorado, Kansas, east of Wichita, then transferred to Oklahoma State University in 2015 and played two seasons for the Cowboys under head coach Mike Gundy. As a junior in 2015, he had 17 carries for 104 rushing yards and two rushing touchdowns against UTSA; for the season, he had 517 rushing yards, four rushing touchdowns, and 17 receptions for 170 receiving yards. On November 19, 2016, against TCU, he had 17 carries for 146 yards and a touchdown. Overall, he finished the 2016 season with 559 rushing yards, nine rushing touchdowns, 13 receptions, 128 receiving yards, and a receiving touchdown.

=== College statistics ===
Season	Team	GP	Rushing				Receiving			
Season	Team	GP	Att	Yds	Avg	TD	Rec	Yds	Avg	TD
2013	Butler Community College	11	109	611	5.6	8	7	94	8.4	0
2014	Butler Community College	9	139	994	7.2	9	12	63	7.0	2
2015	Oklahoma State	12	131	517	3.9	4	17	170	10.0	0
2016	Oklahoma State	9	82	559	6.8	9	13	128	9.8	1
Career		21	213	1,076	5.1	13	30	298	9.9	1

== Professional career ==
Pre-draft measurables
Height	Weight	Arm length	Hand span	40-yard dash	10-yard split	20-yard split	20-yard shuttle	Three-cone drill	Vertical jump	Broad jump	Bench press
5 ft 11 3/4 in (1.82 m)	218 lb (99 kg)	33 1/4 in (0.84 m)	9 5/8 in (0.24 m)	4.58 s	1.52 s	2.66 s	4.28 s	7.53 s	39 in (0.99 m)	10 ft 10 in (3.30 m)	23 reps
All values from NFL Combine and Pro Day

=== 2017 season ===
In the 2017 NFL draft, Carson was selected by the Seattle Seahawks in the seventh round, 249th overall. Two weeks later on May 12, the Seahawks signed him to a four-year, $2.46 million contract with a signing bonus of $65,129.

In his NFL debut on September 10, 2017, Carson had six rushes for 39 yards and one reception for 10 yards in a 17–9 loss to the Green Bay Packers. In Week 2, against the San Francisco 49ers, his role expanded with 20 carries for 93 yards. Carson emerged as the Seahawks main running back ahead of veterans Thomas Rawls and Eddie Lacy, starting Weeks 3 and 4. In Week 3, against the Tennessee Titans, he had his first career receiving touchdown on a ten-yard reception from Russell Wilson. However, in Week 4 against the Indianapolis Colts on Sunday Night Football, Carson was carted off with a significant ankle injury. The next day, it was revealed that Carson broke his ankle and was placed on injured reserve. Overall, he finished his rookie season with 208 rushing yards to go along with seven receptions for 59 receiving yards and a receiving touchdown.

=== 2018 season ===
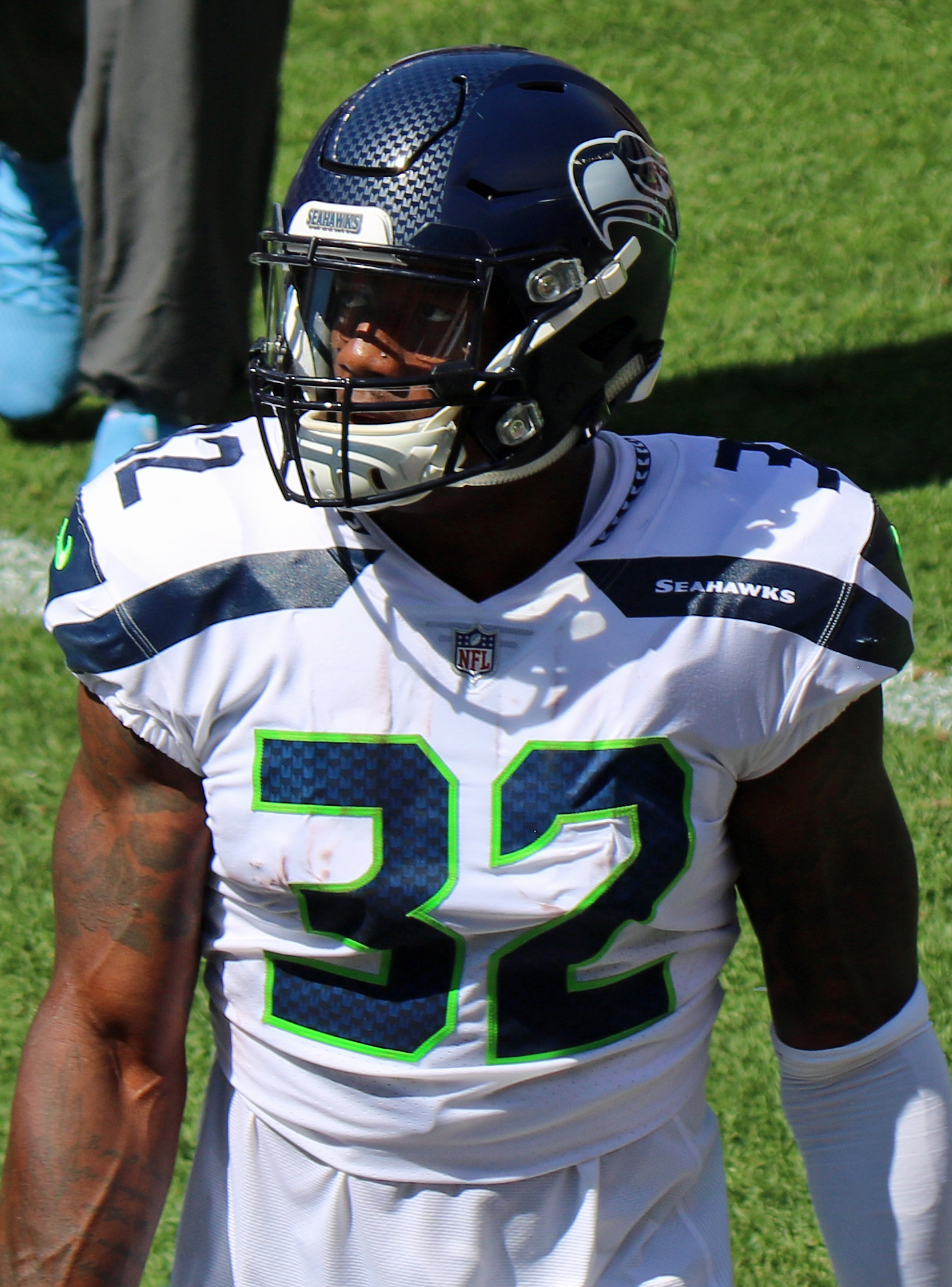
Carson in 2018

Carson returned from his injury to contribute immediately for the Seahawks in the 2018 season. In Week 3, against the Dallas Cowboys, he had 32 carries for 102 rushing yards and a rushing touchdown to go along with two receptions for 22 receiving yards in the 24–13 victory. In Week 5, in the 33–31 loss to the Los Angeles Rams, he had 116 rushing yards. Carson was named NFC Offensive Player of the Month for December. Carson went on to have a great second season finishing fifth in the NFL in rushing yards (1,151) and tied for seventh in the NFL with nine rushing touchdowns. Carson was the first Seahawks running back to rush for over 1,000 yards since Marshawn Lynch in 2014. The Seahawks as a whole, led the league in rushing behind Carson's efforts leading the way. The Seahawks made the playoffs and faced off against the Dallas Cowboys in the Wild Card Round. Carson had 13 carries for 20 yards in his playoff debut, a 24–22 loss.

=== 2019 season ===
In Week 1 against the Cincinnati Bengals, Carson rushed 15 times for 46 yards and a touchdown and caught six passes for 35 yards and a touchdown in the 21–20 win. In Week 4, against the Arizona Cardinals, Carson had 145 scrimmage yards (104 rushing, 41 receiving) in the 27–10 victory. In Week 5 against the Rams, Carson rushed 27 times for 118 yards and caught a five-yard touchdown pass on a fourth down late in the game during the 30–29 win. In Week 6 against the Cleveland Browns, Carson rushed 24 times for 124 yards and a touchdown and caught four passes for 35 yards in the 32–28 win. In Week 10 against the 49ers on Monday Night Football, Carson rushed 25 times for 89 yards and a touchdown in the 27–24 overtime win. In Week 13 against the Minnesota Vikings on Monday Night Football, Carson rushed 23 times for 102 yards and a touchdown during the 37–30 win. During Week 15 against the Carolina Panthers, Carson finished with 133 rushing yards and two touchdowns as the Seahawks won 30–24. In Week 16, Carson suffered a fractured hip and was placed on injured reserve on December 24, 2019, ending his season. Carson finished the 2019 season with 1,230 rushing yards and seven rushing touchdowns to go along with 37 receptions for 266 receiving yards and two receiving touchdowns. He was ranked 96th by his fellow players on the NFL Top 100 Players of 2020.

=== 2020 season ===
In Week 1 against the Atlanta Falcons, Carson rushed six times for 21 yards and caught six passes for 45 yards and two receiving touchdowns during the 38–25 road victory. He became the Seahawks' first running back to record multiple receiving touchdowns in a game since Dan Doornink did so in Week 9 of the 1981 season. In Week 2 against the New England Patriots on Sunday Night Football, Carson rushed for 72 yards and recorded 36 receiving yards and a touchdown during the 35–30 win. In Week 4 against the Miami Dolphins, Carson totaled 100 yards from scrimmage and two rushing touchdowns during the 31–23 win. In Week 7 against the Arizona Cardinals on Sunday Night Football, Carson ran for 34 yards and had seven receiving yards before suffering a foot injury, causing him to miss the next four weeks. He returned in Week 12 on Monday Night Football against the Philadelphia Eagles, rushing for 41 yards and a touchdown, adding 18 receiving yards on 2 catches during the 23–17 win. In Week 13 against the New York Giants, Carson recorded 110 yards from scrimmage and a receiving touchdown during the 17–12 loss. The next week, in a home game against the New York Jets, he rushed for 76 yards and a touchdown, and also had 3 receptions for 22 yards. Carson finished the 2020 season with 141 rushing attempts for 681 rushing yards and five rushing touchdowns, adding 37 receptions for 287 yards and four receiving touchdowns.

=== 2021 season ===
On March 27, 2021, Carson re-signed on a two-year contract with the Seahawks. He suffered a neck injury in Week 4, missed the following game, then was placed on injured reserve on October 15, 2021. On November 19, it was revealed that Carson needed neck surgery, which prematurely ended his 2021 season. Carson finished the 2021 season with 54 rushing attempts for 232 yards and 3 rushing touchdowns along with 6 receptions for 29 yards.

On July 26, 2022, Carson announced his retirement from football after five seasons due to the neck injury he sustained in the 2021 season. The Seahawks waived him with a failed physical designation, which guarantees him injury protections under the NFL collective bargaining agreement.

== Personal life ==
On August 10, 2026, Carson was announced to join the Redmond High School football team as the running backs coach.

== NFL career statistics ==
Year	Team	Games		Rushing					Receiving					Fumbles	
Year	Team	GP	GS	Att	Yds	Avg	Lng	TD	Rec	Yds	Avg	Lng	TD	Fum	Lost
2017	SEA	4	3	49	208	4.2	30	0	7	59	8.4	10	1	0	0
2018	SEA	14	14	247	1,151	4.7	61	9	20	163	8.2	27	0	3	2
2019	SEA	15	15	278	1,230	4.4	59	7	37	266	7.2	21	2	7	4
2020	SEA	12	12	141	681	4.8	29	5	37	287	7.8	29	4	1	0
2021	SEA	4	4	54	232	4.3	33	3	6	29	4.8	16	0	1	1
Career		49	48	769	3,502	4.6	61	24	107	804	7.5	29	7	12	7
