= 2019 Seattle Seahawks season =

American football team season

- Owner: Estate of Paul Allen
- General manager: John Schneider
- Head coach: Pete Carroll
- Offensive coordinator: Brian Schottenheimer
- Defensive coordinator: Ken Norton Jr.
- Home stadium: CenturyLink Field

Results
- Record: 11–5
- Division place: 2nd NFC West
- Playoffs: Won Wild Card Playoffs (at Eagles) 17–9; Lost Divisional Playoffs (at Packers) 23–28
- All-Pros: 2: LB Bobby Wagner (1st team); QB Russell Wilson (2nd team)
- Pro Bowlers: 3: QB Russell Wilson; MLB Bobby Wagner; CB Shaquill Griffin

Uniform
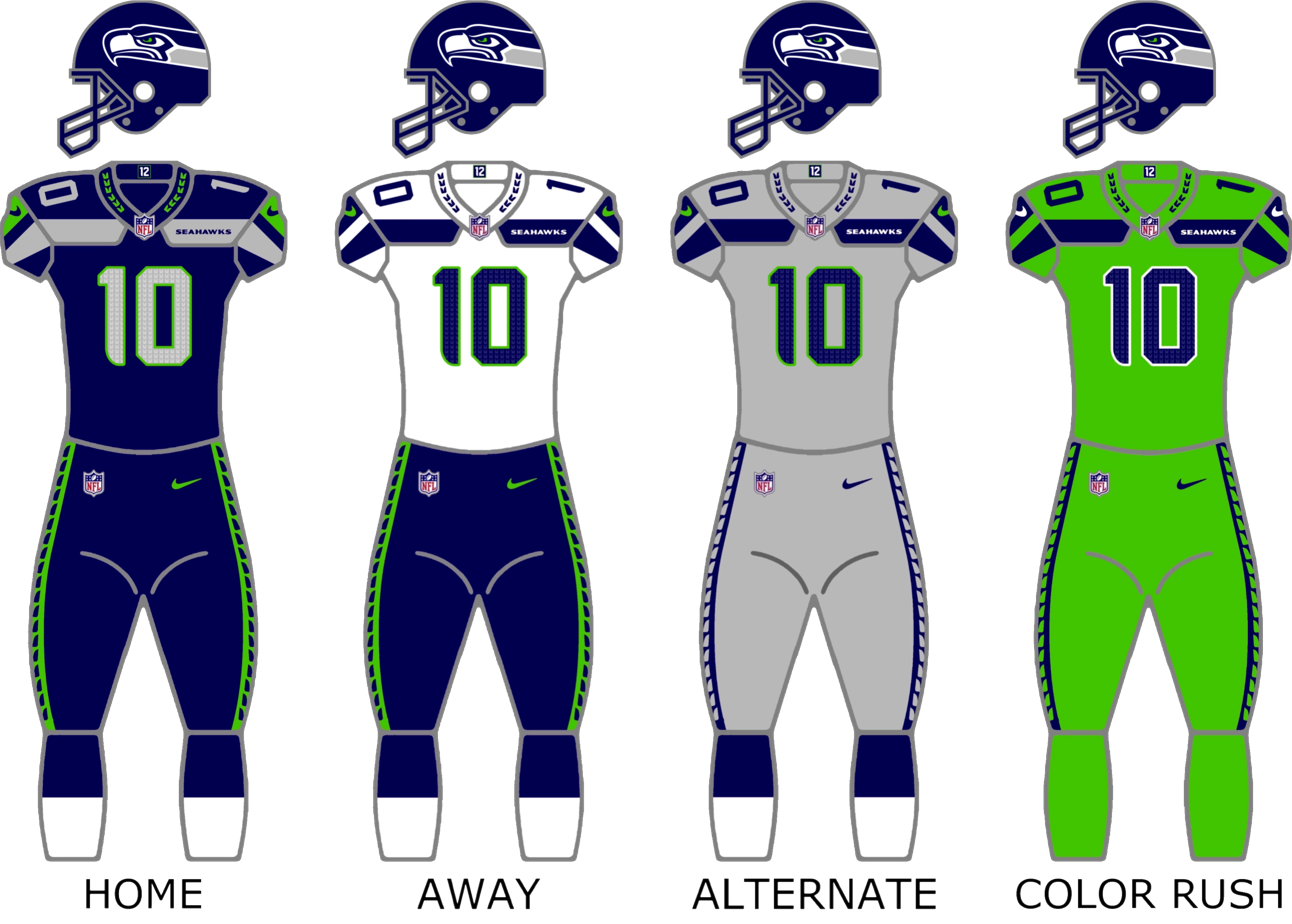

The 2019 season was the Seattle Seahawks' 44th in the National Football League (NFL) and their 10th under head coach Pete Carroll. It marked their first full season since 1996 without longtime owner Paul Allen, who had died during the 2018 season.

For the first time since 2010, Earl Thomas did not play for the Seahawks as he signed with the Baltimore Ravens via free agency during the offseason. Thomas was the last remaining original member of the Legion of Boom defensive secondary. This was also the first time since 2010 without wide receiver Doug Baldwin, as he was released from the team after a failed physical designation, along with strong safety Kam Chancellor. Baldwin announced his retirement three days later.

The Seahawks set a franchise record for most road wins in a season by going 7–1. Their previous best was 6–2 during the 2013 season. Meanwhile, the team had a relatively mediocre 4–4 record at home. The Seahawks also set the best record for one-score games at 10–2 until it was surpassed by the 2022 Minnesota Vikings who went 11–0 in one-score games. This was the Seahawks' last season with a playoff win, until the 2025 season.

== Notable events ==
On September 1, 2019, the Seahawks traded Jacob Martin, Barkevious Mingo and a 2020 3rd round pick (91st overall subsequently traded, Devin Asiasi) to the Houston Texans for star defensive end Jadeveon Clowney. Over his 13-game season, Clowney obtained 3 sacks, 1 interception, 13 quarterback hits, both an interception and fumble return touchdown, as well as a career-high 4 forced fumbles. Although Clowney accrued a lower sack total than his previous seasons, he provided some much needed quarterback pressure in a lackluster Seattle pass rush. The Seahawks then made a late-season trade in October, trading a 2020 fifth-round pick to the Detroit Lions for safety Quandre Diggs, in an effort to supplement the loss of Earl Thomas. Diggs indeed bolstered the Seattle secondary: producing 21 tackles, 3 interceptions, 3 pass deflections, 1 forced fumble, 1 fumble recovery, and a return touchdown during his 5 games with the team.

On October 3, 2019, Seahawks owner Paul Allen was posthumously inducted into the Seahawks Ring of Honor before a 30–29 home victory against the Los Angeles Rams on Thursday Night Football.

After starting the season with a 10–2 record, they collapsed to a 1–3 finish in the final four games, due in part to injuries. With a Week 15 win over the Carolina Panthers, the Seahawks improved on their 10–6 record from the previous season. A loss by the Rams later that day clinched the Seahawks their seventh playoff appearance in the last eight seasons. In the playoffs, the Seahawks defeated the NFC East champion Philadelphia Eagles 17–9 in the Wild Card round, but lost 28–23 to the Green Bay Packers in the Divisional round. While they finished the regular season with an 11–5 record, they had just a +7 point differential, their worst in the Russell Wilson era.

Rookie wide receiver DK Metcalf made an immediate impact. His 89 receiving yards in Week 1 against the Cincinnati Bengals was the most ever by a Seahawks receiver in their rookie debut, passing Hall of Famer Steve Largent. He caught a total of 58 passes for 900 yards and 7 touchdowns, the second most catches and receiving yards by a rookie in franchise history. Metcalf also holds the NFL and franchise rookie record for most receiving yards in a playoff game, after a 160-yard performance against the Eagles during the Wild Card round.

Former Seahawks running back Marshawn Lynch returned due to a slew of injuries to other running backs. In 2019, all but four of the Seahawks' games were decided by one possession (8 or less points).

== Draft ==
2019 Seattle Seahawks draft
Round	Pick	Player	Position	College	Notes
1	29	L. J. Collier	DE	TCU	From Kansas City Chiefs
2	47	Marquise Blair	S	Utah	From Carolina Panthers
2	64	DK Metcalf *	WR	Ole Miss	From New England Patriots
3	88	Cody Barton	LB	Utah	From Philadelphia Eagles via Detroit Lions and Minnesota Vikings
4	120	Gary Jennings Jr.	WR	West Virginia	From Minnesota Vikings
4	124	Phil Haynes	G	Wake Forest	
4	132	Ugo Amadi	CB	Oregon	From New Orleans Saints via New York Giants
5	142	Ben Burr-Kirven	LB	Washington	From Detroit Lions via San Francisco 49ers and New York Giants
6	204	Travis Homer	RB	Miami	From New England Patriots via Detroit Lions and Minnesota Vikings
6	209	Demarcus Christmas	DT	Florida State	From Minnesota Vikings
7	236	John Ursua	WR	Hawaii	From Baltimore Ravens
Made roster * Made at least one Pro Bowl during career

Notes

- The Seahawks traded their first-round selection (21st overall) to the Green Bay Packers in exchange for Green Bay's first- and two fourth-round selections (30th, 114th and 118th overall).
- The Kansas City Chiefs traded their first-round selection (29th overall) to the Seahawks in exchange for pass rusher Frank Clark.
- The Seahawks traded their first-round selection (30th overall) to the New York Giants in exchange for New York's second-, fourth- and fifth-round selections (37th, 132nd and 142nd overall).
- The Seahawks traded their second-round selection (37th overall) to the Carolina Panthers in exchange for Carolina's second- and third-round selections (47th and 77th overall).
- The Seahawks traded their second-round selection (54th overall) to the Houston Texans in exchange for offensive tackle Duane Brown.
- The Seahawks traded their third- and fourth-round selections (77th and 118th overall) to the New England Patriots in exchange for New England's second-round selection (64th overall).
- The Seahawks traded their third- and fifth-round selections (92nd and 159th overall) to the Minnesota Vikings in exchange for Minnesota's third- and sixth-round selections (88th and 209th overall).
- The Seahawks traded their fourth-round selection (114th overall) to the Minnesota Vikings in exchange for Minnesota's fourth- and sixth-round selections (120th and 204th overall).
- The Seahawks traded their sixth-round selection (194th overall) to the Green Bay Packers in exchange for quarterback Brett Hundley.
- The Seahawks traded their seventh-round selection (235th overall) to the Oakland Raiders in exchange for safety Shalom Luani.

== Personnel ==
=== Staff / Coaches ===
2019 Seattle Seahawks staff
Front office: Owner – Paul G. Allen Trust; Executor/Chairwoman – Jody Allen; President – Chuck Arnold; Executive vice president/general manager – John Schneider; Vice president of football administration – Matt Thomas; Co-director of player personnel – Scott Fitterer; Co-director of player personnel – Trent Kirchner; Director of college scouting – Matt Berry; Director of pro personnel – Nolan Teasley; Head coaches: Head coach/executive vice president of football operations – Pete Carroll; Assistant head coach/defense line – Clint Hurtt; Offensive coaches: Offensive coordinator – Brian Schottenheimer; Quarterbacks – Dave Canales; Assistant quarterbacks – Steve Shimko; Running backs – Chad Morton; Wide receivers – Nate Carroll; Assistant wide receivers – Brad Idzik; Tight ends – Pat McPherson; Offensive line – Mike Solari; Assistant offensive line – Pat Ruel; Assistant offensive line – Brennan Carroll; Offensive assistant – Austin Davis	Defensive coaches: Defensive coordinator – Ken Norton Jr.; Passing game coordinator – Andre Curtis; Assistant defensive line – Jethro Franklin; Linebackers – John Glenn; Secondary – Nick Sorensen; Defensive quality control – Tom Donatell; Special teams coaches: Special teams coordinator – Brian Schneider; Assistant special teams – Larry Izzo; Strength and conditioning: Head strength and conditioning – Ivan Lewis; Assistant strength and conditioning – Jamie Yanchar; Strength and conditioning assistant – Thomas Garcia; Strength and conditioning assistant – Mark Philipp; Strength and conditioning assistant – Grant Steen

== Final roster ==
2019 Seattle Seahawks roster
Quarterbacks (QB): 7 Geno Smith; 3 Russell Wilson; Running backs (RB): 44 Nick Bellore FB; 25 Travis Homer; 24 Marshawn Lynch; 34 Robert Turbin; Wide receivers (WR): 18 Jaron Brown; 16 Tyler Lockett; 14 DK Metcalf; 83 David Moore; 17 Malik Turner; 15 John Ursua; Tight ends (TE): 48 Jacob Hollister; 46 Tyrone Swoopes; 82 Luke Willson	Offensive linemen (OL): 76 Duane Brown T; 74 George Fant T; 78 D. J. Fluker G; 60 Phil Haynes G; 53 Joey Hunt C; 65 Germain Ifedi T; 70 Mike Iupati G; 73 Jamarco Jones G/T; 77 Ethan Pocic G; 64 Jordan Roos G; Defensive linemen (DL): 94 Ezekiel Ansah DE; 90 Jadeveon Clowney DE; 95 L. J. Collier DE; 97 Poona Ford DT; 98 Rasheem Green DE; 93 Branden Jackson DE; 99 Quinton Jefferson DE/DT; 79 Bryan Mone DT; 91 Jarran Reed DT	Linebackers (LB): 57 Cody Barton OLB; 55 Ben Burr-Kirven MLB; 49 Shaquem Griffin OLB; 56 Mychal Kendricks OLB; 54 Bobby Wagner MLB; 51 Dekoda Watson OLB; 50 K. J. Wright OLB; Defensive backs (DB): 28 Ugo Amadi SS; 27 Marquise Blair FS; 37 Quandre Diggs FS; 21 Tre Flowers CB; 26 Shaquill Griffin CB; 42 Lano Hill SS; 36 Akeem King CB; 30 Bradley McDougald SS; 35 Ryan Neal FS; Special teams (ST): 4 Michael Dickson P; 5 Jason Myers K; 69 Tyler Ott LS	Practice squad: 40 Brian Allen CB; 61 Kyle Fuller C; 19 Penny Hart WR; 62 Kahlil McKenzie G; 85 Wes Saxton TE; 47 Sutton Smith FB; 58 Shakir Soto DT; 59 Pita Taumoepenu OLB; 41 Xavier Turner RB; 75 Chad Wheeler T; Reserve: 1 Jeremy Boykins CB (IR); 68 Justin Britt C (IR); 32 Chris Carson RB (IR); 38 Adam Choice RB (IR); 67 Demarcus Christmas DT (PUP); 84 Ed Dickson TE (IR); 88 Will Dissly TE (IR); 52 Emmanuel Ellerbee OLB (IR); 10 Josh Gordon WR (Susp.); 86 Justin Johnson TE (IR); 92 Nazair Jones DE (IR); 63 Demetrius Knox G (IR); 20 Rashaad Penny RB (IR); 22 C. J. Prosise RB (IR); 39 Kalan Reed CB (IR); 66 Jordan Simmons G (IR); 33 Tedric Thompson FS (IR); 23 Neiko Thorpe CB (IR); 72 Al Woods DT (Susp.); Rookies in italics 53 active, 19 reserve, 10 practice squad

== Preseason ==
Week	Date	Opponent	Result	Record	Venue	Recap
1	August 8	Denver Broncos	W 22–14	1–0	CenturyLink Field	Recap
2	August 18	at Minnesota Vikings	L 19–25	1–1	U.S. Bank Stadium	Recap
3	August 24	at Los Angeles Chargers	W 23–15	2–1	Dignity Health Sports Park	Recap
4	August 29	Oakland Raiders	W 17–15	3–1	CenturyLink Field	Recap

== Regular season ==
=== Schedule ===
Divisional matchups: the NFC West played the NFC South and the AFC North.

Week	Date	Opponent	Result	Record	Venue	Recap
1	September 8	Cincinnati Bengals	**W** 21–20	1–0	CenturyLink Field	Recap
2	September 15	at Pittsburgh Steelers	**W** 28–26	2–0	Heinz Field	Recap
3	September 22	New Orleans Saints	**L** 27–33	2–1	CenturyLink Field	Recap
4	September 29	at **Arizona Cardinals**	**W** 27–10	3–1	State Farm Stadium	Recap
5	October 3	**Los Angeles Rams**	**W** 30–29	4–1	CenturyLink Field	Recap
6	October 13	at Cleveland Browns	**W** 32–28	5–1	FirstEnergy Stadium	Recap
7	October 20	Baltimore Ravens	**L** 16–30	5–2	CenturyLink Field	Recap
8	October 27	at Atlanta Falcons	**W** 27–20	6–2	Mercedes-Benz Stadium	Recap
9	November 3	Tampa Bay Buccaneers	**W** 40–34 (OT)	7–2	CenturyLink Field	Recap
10	November 11	at **San Francisco 49ers**	**W** 27–24 (OT)	8–2	Levi's Stadium	Recap
11	Bye					
12	November 24	at Philadelphia Eagles	**W** 17–9	9–2	Lincoln Financial Field	Recap
13	December 2	Minnesota Vikings	**W** 37–30	10–2	CenturyLink Field	Recap
14	December 8	at **Los Angeles Rams**	**L** 12–28	10–3	Los Angeles Memorial Coliseum	Recap
15	December 15	at Carolina Panthers	**W** 30–24	11–3	Bank of America Stadium	Recap
16	December 22	**Arizona Cardinals**	**L** 13–27	11–4	CenturyLink Field	Recap
17	December 29	**San Francisco 49ers**	**L** 21–26	11–5	CenturyLink Field	Recap

Note: Intra-division opponents are in bold text.

=== Game summaries ===
==== Week 1: vs. Cincinnati Bengals ====
Week One: Cincinnati Bengals at Seattle Seahawks – Game summary

Quarter	1	2	3	4	Total
Bengals	3	14	0	3	**20**
**Seahawks**	0	14	0	7	**21**

at CenturyLink Field, Seattle, Washington

- Date: September 8
- Game time: 1:05 p.m. PDT
- Game weather: Cloudy, 64 °F (18 °C)
- Game attendance: 68,710
- Referee: Brad Rogers
- TV announcers (CBS): Spero Dedes and Adam Archuleta
- Recap, Game Book

Game information

**First quarter**

- CIN – Randy Bullock 39-yard field goal, 2:48. Bengals 3–0. **Drive: 13 plays, 51 yards, 7:38.**

**Second quarter**

- SEA – Chris Carson 1-yard run (Jason Myers kick), 6:36. Seahawks 7–3. **Drive: 7 plays, 48 yards, 4:36.**
- CIN – John Ross 33-yard pass from Andy Dalton (Randy Bullock kick), 5:12. Bengals 10–7. **Drive: 3 plays, 75 yards, 1:24.**
- SEA – Chris Carson 10-yard pass from Russell Wilson (Jason Myers kick), 0:52. Seahawks 14–10. **Drive: 6 plays, 77 yards, 1:01.**
- CIN – John Ross 55-yard pass from Andy Dalton (Randy Bullock kick), 0:07. Bengals 17–14. **Drive: 4 plays, 75 yards, 0:45.**

**Third quarter**

- No scoring plays.

**Fourth quarter**

- SEA – Tyler Lockett 44-yard pass from Russell Wilson (Jason Myers kick), 14:53. Seahawks 21–17. **Drive: 4 plays, 64 yards, 2:08.**
- CIN – Randy Bullock 27-yard field goal, 7:00. Seahawks 21–20. **Drive: 13 plays, 67 yards, 7:53.**

**Top passers**

- CIN – Andy Dalton – 35/51, 418 yards, 2 TD
- SEA – Russell Wilson – 14/20, 196 yards, 2 TD

**Top rushers**

- CIN – Giovani Bernard – 7 rushes, 21 yards
- SEA – Chris Carson – 15 rushes, 46 yards, TD

**Top receivers**

- CIN – John Ross – 7 receptions, 158 yards, 2 TD
- SEA – DK Metcalf – 4 receptions, 89 yards

==== Week 2: at Pittsburgh Steelers ====
Week Two: Seattle Seahawks at Pittsburgh Steelers – Game summary

Quarter	1	2	3	4	Total
**Seahawks**	0	7	14	7	**28**
Steelers	0	10	3	13	**26**

at Heinz Field, Pittsburgh, Pennsylvania

- Date: September 15
- Game time: 10:00 a.m. PDT/1:00 p.m. EDT
- Game weather: Sunny, 81 °F (27 °C)
- Game attendance: 65,063
- Referee: Carl Cheffers
- TV announcers (Fox): Kenny Albert, Ronde Barber and Lindsay Czarniak
- Recap, Game Book

Game information

**First quarter**

- No scoring plays.

**Second quarter**

- PIT – James Conner 1-yard run (Chris Boswell kick), 14:44. Steelers 7–0. **Drive: 3 plays, 22 yards, 0:27.**
- SEA – Will Dissly 14-yard pass from Russell Wilson (Jason Myers kick), 8:40. Tied 7–7. **Drive: 12 plays, 75 yards, 6:04.**
- PIT – Chris Boswell 41-yard field goal, 2:28. Steelers 10–7. **Drive: 7 plays, 49 yards, 3:26.**

**Third quarter**

- SEA – Will Dissly 12-yard pass from Russell Wilson (Jason Myers kick), 9:49. Seahawks 14–10. **Drive: 6 plays, 40 yards, 2:46.**
- PIT – Chris Boswell 33-yard field goal, 6:21. Seahawks 14–13. **Drive: 7 plays, 60 yards, 3:28.**
- SEA – Rashaad Penny 37-yard run (Jason Myers kick), 2:56. Seahawks 21–13. **Drive: 7 plays, 75 yards, 3:25.**

**Fourth quarter**

- PIT – Vance McDonald 8-yard pass from Mason Rudolph (pass failed), 11:16. Seahawks 21–19. **Drive: 12 plays, 75 yards, 6:40.**
- SEA – DK Metcalf 28-yard pass from Russell Wilson (Jason Myers kick), 7:15. Seahawks 28–19. **Drive: 6 plays, 75 yards, 4:01.**
- PIT – Vance McDonald 3-yard pass from Mason Rudolph (Chris Boswell kick), 5:34. Seahawks 28–26. **Drive: 1 play, 3 yards, 0:03.**

**Top passers**

- SEA – Russell Wilson – 29/35, 300 yards, 3 TD
- PIT – Mason Rudolph – 12/19, 112 yards, 2 TD, INT

**Top rushers**

- SEA – Rashaad Penny – 10 rushes, 62 yards, TD
- PIT – James Conner – 11 rushes, 33 yards, TD

**Top receivers**

- SEA – Tyler Lockett – 10 receptions, 79 yards
- PIT – JuJu Smith-Schuster – 5 receptions, 84 yards

==== Week 3: vs. New Orleans Saints ====
Week Three: New Orleans Saints at Seattle Seahawks – Game summary

Quarter	1	2	3	4	Total
**Saints**	7	13	7	6	**33**
Seahawks	7	0	0	20	**27**

at CenturyLink Field, Seattle, Washington

- Date: September 22
- Game time: 1:25 p.m. PDT
- Game weather: Rain, 63 °F (17 °C)
- Game attendance: 69,005
- Referee: Ronald Torbert
- TV announcers (CBS): Jim Nantz, Tony Romo and Tracy Wolfson
- Recap, Game Book

Game information

**First quarter**

- NO – Deonte Harris 53-yard punt return (Wil Lutz kick), 12:06. Saints 7–0.
- SEA – Tyler Lockett 8-yard pass from Russell Wilson (Jason Myers kick), 2:24. Tied 7–7. **Drive: 6 plays, 64 yards, 3:28.**

**Second quarter**

- NO – Vonn Bell 33-yard fumble return (kick failed, wide left), 6:50. Saints 13–7.
- NO – Alvin Kamara 29-yard pass from Teddy Bridgewater (Wil Lutz kick), 0:33. Saints 20–7. **Drive: 7 plays, 58 yards, 2:00.**

**Third quarter**

- NO – Michael Thomas 1-yard pass from Teddy Bridgewater (Wil Lutz kick), 7:44. Saints 27–7. **Drive: 12 plays, 75 yards, 7:16.**

**Fourth quarter**

- SEA – Russell Wilson 2-yard run (Jason Myers kick), 11:51. Saints 27–14. **Drive: 10 plays, 78 yards, 3:09.**
- NO – Alvin Kamara 1-yard run (run failed), 4:19. Saints 33–14. **Drive: 8 plays, 28 yards, 5:22.**
- SEA – Russell Wilson 8-yard run (Jason Myers kick), 2:48. Saints 33–21. **Drive: 9 plays, 75 yards, 1:31.**
- SEA – Will Dissly 4-yard pass from Russell Wilson, 0:00. Saints 33–27. **Drive: 11 plays, 82 yards, 1:42.**

**Top passers**

- NO – Teddy Bridgewater – 19/27, 177 yards, 2 TD
- SEA – Russell Wilson – 32/50, 406 yards, 2 TD

**Top rushers**

- NO – Alvin Kamara – 16 rushes, 69 yards, TD
- SEA – Chris Carson – 15 rushes, 53 yards

**Top receivers**

- NO – Alvin Kamara – 9 receptions, 92 yards, TD
- SEA – Tyler Lockett – 11 receptions, 154 yards, TD

This was the first September home loss of the Russell Wilson/Pete Carroll era, as well as their first since 2009.

==== Week 4: at Arizona Cardinals ====
Week Four: Seattle Seahawks at Arizona Cardinals – Game summary

Quarter	1	2	3	4	Total
**Seahawks**	10	10	0	7	**27**
Cardinals	0	3	0	7	**10**

at State Farm Stadium, Glendale, Arizona

- Date: September 29
- Game time: 1:05 p.m. MST & PDT
- Game weather: None (retractable roof closed)
- Game attendance: 60,500
- Referee: Shawn Smith
- TV announcers (Fox): Dick Stockton, Mark Schlereth and Jennifer Hale
- Recap, Game Book

Game information

**First quarter**

- SEA – Jason Myers 33-yard field goal, 4:59. Seahawks 3–0. **Drive: 11 plays, 52 yards, 4:44.**
- SEA – Jadeveon Clowney 27-yard interception return (Jason Myers kick), 4:15. Seahawks 10–0.

**Second quarter**

- ARI – Zane Gonzalez 33-yard field goal, 13:49. Seahawks 10–3. **Drive: 12 plays, 60 yards, 5:26.**
- SEA – Will Dissly 9-yard pass from Russell Wilson (Jason Myers kick), 10:48. Seahawks 17–3. **Drive: 6 plays, 75 yards, 3:01.**
- SEA – Jason Myers 24-yard field goal, 0:17. Seahawks 20–3. **Drive: 10 plays, 50 yards, 3:53.**

**Third quarter**

- No scoring plays.

**Fourth quarter**

- ARI – Kyler Murray 9-yard run (Zane Gonzalez kick), 10:21. Seahawks 20–10. **Drive: 8 plays, 80 yards, 3:11.**
- SEA – C. J. Prosise 9-yard run (Jason Myers kick), 2:13. Seahawks 27–10. **Drive: 15 plays, 75 yards, 8:08.**

**Top passers**

- SEA – Russell Wilson – 22/28, 240 yards, TD
- ARI – Kyler Murray – 22/32, 241 yards, INT

**Top rushers**

- SEA – Chris Carson – 22 rushes, 104 yards
- ARI – David Johnson – 11 rushes, 40 yards

**Top receivers**

- SEA – Will Dissly – 7 receptions, 57 yards, TD
- ARI – David Johnson – 8 receptions, 99 yards

The Seahawks started the season 3–1 for the first time since 2016.

==== Week 5: vs. Los Angeles Rams ====
Week Five: Los Angeles Rams at Seattle Seahawks – Game summary

Quarter	1	2	3	4	Total
Rams	6	7	13	3	**29**
**Seahawks**	7	7	7	9	**30**

at CenturyLink Field, Seattle, Washington

- Date: October 3
- Game time: 5:20 p.m. PDT
- Game weather: Cloudy, 57 °F (14 °C)
- Game attendance: 68,988
- Referee: Scott Novak
- TV announcers (Fox/Amazon Prime Video): Joe Buck, Troy Aikman, Erin Andrews and Kristina Pink
- Recap, Game Book

Game information

**First quarter**

- LAR – Greg Zuerlein 47-yard field goal, 12:24. Rams 3–0. **Drive: 4 plays, 4 yards, 1:23.**
- LAR – Greg Zuerlein 32-yard field goal, 4:55. Rams 6–0. **Drive: 10 plays, 55 yards, 4:32.**
- SEA – Tyler Lockett 13-yard pass from Russell Wilson (Jason Myers kick), 0:49. Seahawks 7–6. **Drive: 7 plays, 75 yards, 4:06.**

**Second quarter**

- SEA – DK Metcalf 40-yard pass from Russell Wilson (Jason Myers kick), 8:08. Seahawks 14–6. **Drive: 5 plays, 73 yards, 2:46.**
- LAR – Cooper Kupp 9-yard pass from Jared Goff (Greg Zuerlein kick), 0:06. Seahawks 14–13. **Drive: 8 plays, 62 yards, 1:28.**

**Third quarter**

- LAR – Todd Gurley 8-yard run (Greg Zuerlein kick), 12:07. Rams 20–14. **Drive: 6 plays, 75 yards, 2:53.**
- SEA – David Moore 10-yard pass from Russell Wilson (Jason Myers kick), 5:45. Seahawks 21–20. **Drive: 6 plays, 47 yards, 2:59.**
- LAR – Todd Gurley 1-yard run (run failed), 3:07. Rams 26–21. **Drive: 5 plays, 75 yards, 2:38.**

**Fourth quarter**

- SEA – Jason Myers 42-yard field goal, 13:37. Rams 26–24. **Drive: 9 plays, 51 yards, 4:30.**
- LAR – Greg Zuerlein 36-yard field goal, 9:19. Rams 29–24. **Drive: 10 plays, 57 yards, 4:18.**
- SEA – Chris Carson 5-yard pass from Russell Wilson (pass failed), 2:28. Seahawks 30–29. **Drive: 12 plays, 75 yards, 6:51.**

**Top passers**

- LAR – Jared Goff – 29/49, 395 yards, TD, INT
- SEA – Russell Wilson – 17/23, 268 yards, 4 TD

**Top rushers**

- LAR – Todd Gurley – 15 rushes, 51 yards, 2 TD
- SEA – Chris Carson – 27 rushes, 118 yards

**Top receivers**

- LAR – Gerald Everett – 7 receptions, 136 yards
- SEA – Will Dissly – 4 receptions, 81 yards

With the win, the Seahawks went to 4–1 for the first time since 2016.

==== Week 6: at Cleveland Browns ====
Week Six: Seattle Seahawks at Cleveland Browns – Game summary

Quarter	1	2	3	4	Total
**Seahawks**	6	12	7	7	**32**
Browns	14	6	0	8	**28**

at FirstEnergy Stadium, Cleveland, Ohio

- Date: October 13
- Game time: 10:00 a.m. PDT/1:00 p.m. EDT
- Game weather: Sunny, 58 °F (14 °C)
- Game attendance: 67,431
- Referee: Adrian Hill
- TV announcers (Fox): Chris Myers, Daryl Johnston and Laura Okmin
- Recap, Game Book

Game information

**First quarter**

- CLE – Nick Chubb 7-yard run (Austin Seibert kick), 13:01. Browns 7–0. **Drive: 3 plays, 23 yards, 1:59.**
- SEA – Russell Wilson 16-yard run (kick failed, wide right), 8:52. Browns 7–6. **Drive: 7 plays, 75 yards, 4:09.**
- CLE – Baker Mayfield 10-yard run (Austin Seibert kick), 4:43. Browns 14–6. **Drive: 10 plays, 69 yards, 4:09.**

**Second quarter**

- CLE – Ricky Seals-Jones 31-yard pass from Baker Mayfield (kick failed, wide left), 14:54. Browns 20–6. **Drive: 3 plays, 92 yards, 1:25.**
- SEA – Jason Myers 38-yard field goal, 10:46. Browns 20–9. **Drive: 9 plays, 55 yards, 4:08.**
- SEA – Jason Myers 20-yard field goal, 7:25. Browns 20–12. **Drive: 6 plays, 18 yards, 2:41.**
- SEA – Jaron Brown 17-yard pass from Russell Wilson (run failed), 0:22. Browns 20–18. **Drive: 8 plays, 88 yards, 1:07.**

**Third quarter**

- SEA – Jaron Brown 6-yard pass from Russell Wilson (Jason Myers kick), 6:00. Seahawks 25–20. **Drive: 7 plays, 58 yards, 2:54.**

**Fourth quarter**

- CLE – Nick Chubb 3-yard run (Baker Mayfield–Demetrius Harris pass), 9:02. Browns 28–25. **Drive: 2 plays, 24 yards, 0:46.**
- SEA – Chris Carson 1-yard run (Jason Myers kick), 3:30. Seahawks 32–28. **Drive: 9 plays, 79 yards, 5:32.**

**Top passers**

- SEA – Russell Wilson – 23/33, 295 yards, 2 TD
- CLE – Baker Mayfield – 22/37, 249 yards, TD, 3 INT

**Top rushers**

- SEA – Chris Carson – 24 rushes, 124 yards, TD
- CLE – Nick Chubb – 20 rushes, 122 yards, 2 TD

**Top receivers**

- SEA – Tyler Lockett – 5 receptions, 75 yards
- CLE – Odell Beckham Jr. – 6 receptions, 101 yards

With the win, the Seahawks improved to 5–1 for the first time since their Super Bowl winning 2013 season.

==== Week 7: vs. Baltimore Ravens ====
Week Seven: Baltimore Ravens at Seattle Seahawks – Game summary

Quarter	1	2	3	4	Total
**Ravens**	3	10	7	10	**30**
Seahawks	0	13	0	3	**16**

at CenturyLink Field, Seattle, Washington

- Date: October 20
- Game time: 1:25 p.m. PDT
- Game weather: Rain, 50 °F (10 °C)
- Game attendance: 69,012
- Referee: Brad Allen
- TV announcers (Fox): Dick Stockton, Mark Schlereth, Ronde Barber and Jennifer Hale
- Recap, Game Book

Game information

**First quarter**

- BAL – Justin Tucker 25-yard field goal, 10:19. Ravens 3–0. **Drive: 8 plays, 77 yards, 4:41.**

**Second quarter**

- SEA – Tyler Lockett 8-yard pass from Russell Wilson (Jason Myers kick), 14:46. Seahawks 7–3. **Drive: 11 plays, 83 yards, 6:00.**
- BAL – Justin Tucker 28-yard field goal, 11:06. Seahawks 7–6. **Drive: 9 plays, 65 yards, 3:40.**
- SEA – Jason Myers 34-yard field goal, 7:35. Seahawks 10–6. **Drive: 9 plays, 59 yards, 3:31.**
- BAL – Marcus Peters 67-yard interception return (Justin Tucker kick) 5:00. Ravens 13–10.
- SEA – Jason Myers 31-yard field goal, 0:02. Tied 13–13. **Drive: 14 plays, 79 yards, 4:58.**

**Third quarter**

- BAL – Lamar Jackson 8-yard run (Justin Tucker kick), 1:20. Ravens 20–13. **Drive: 11 plays, 57 yards, 5:26.**

**Fourth quarter**

- BAL – Justin Tucker 22-yard field goal, 3:47. Ravens 23–13. **Drive: 13 plays, 86 yards, 9:00.**
- BAL – Marlon Humphrey 18-yard fumble return (Justin Tucker kick), 3:37. Ravens 30–13.
- SEA – Jason Myers 35-yard field goal, 1:49. Ravens 30–16. **Drive: 9 plays, 63 yards, 1:48.**

**Top passers**

- BAL – Lamar Jackson – 9/20, 143 yards
- SEA – Russell Wilson – 20/41, 241 yards, TD, INT

**Top rushers**

- BAL – Lamar Jackson – 14 rushes, 116 yards, TD
- SEA – Chris Carson – 21 rushes, 65 yards

**Top receivers**

- BAL – Miles Boykin – 2 receptions, 55 yards
- SEA – Tyler Lockett – 5 receptions, 61 yards, TD

==== Week 8: at Atlanta Falcons ====
Week Eight: Seattle Seahawks at Atlanta Falcons – Game summary

Quarter	1	2	3	4	Total
**Seahawks**	3	21	0	3	**27**
Falcons	0	0	11	9	**20**

at Mercedes-Benz Stadium, Atlanta, Georgia

- Date: October 27
- Game time: 10:00 a.m. PDT/1:00 p.m. EDT
- Game weather: Sunny, 65 °F (18 °C) (retractable roof open)
- Game attendance: 71,483
- Referee: Clete Blakeman
- TV announcers (Fox): Sam Rosen, Ronde Barber and Sara Walsh
- Recap, Game Book

Game information

**First quarter**

- SEA – Jason Myers 42-yard field goal, 11:17. Seahawks 3–0. **Drive: 9 plays, 51 yards, 3:43.**

**Second quarter**

- SEA – DK Metcalf 4-yard pass from Russell Wilson (Jason Myers kick), 11:47. Seahawks 10–0. **Drive: 6 plays, 59 yards, 3:08.**
- SEA – Chris Carson 1-yard run (Jason Myers kick), 4:46. Seahawks 17–0. **Drive: 7 plays, 46 yards, 4:17.**
- SEA – DK Metcalf 2-yard pass from Russell Wilson (Jason Myers kick), 0:27. Seahawks 24–0. **Drive: 9 plays, 57 yards, 2:00.**

**Third quarter**

- ATL – Brian Hill 23-yard run (Matt Schaub-Calvin Ridley pass), 10:54. Seahawks 24–8. **Drive: 7 plays, 75 yards, 4:06.**
- ATL – Matt Bryant 47-yard field goal, 3:25. Seahawks 24–11. **Drive: 10 plays, 34 yards, 5:06.**

**Fourth quarter**

- SEA – Jason Myers 54-yard field goal, 5:53. Seahawks 27–11. **Drive: 10 plays, 58 yards, 6:50.**
- ATL – Austin Hooper 1-yard pass from Matt Schaub (pass failed), 3:08. Seahawks 27–17. **Drive: 11 plays, 75 yards, 2:45.**
- ATL – Matt Bryant 37-yard field goal, 1:17. Seahawks 27–20. **Drive: 8 plays, 67 yards, 1:24.**

**Top passers**

- SEA – Russell Wilson – 14/20, 182 yards, 2 TD
- ATL – Matt Schaub – 39/52, 460 yards, TD, INT

**Top rushers**

- SEA – Chris Carson – 20 rushes, 90 yards, TD
- ATL – Devonta Freeman – 13 rushes, 39 yards

**Top receivers**

- SEA – Tyler Lockett – 6 receptions, 100 yards
- ATL – Julio Jones – 10 receptions, 152 yards

==== Week 9: vs. Tampa Bay Buccaneers ====
Week Nine: Tampa Bay Buccaneers at Seattle Seahawks – Game summary

Quarter	1	2	3	4	OT	Total
Buccaneers	14	7	3	10	0	**34**
**Seahawks**	7	6	8	13	6	**40**

at CenturyLink Field, Seattle, Washington

- Date: November 3
- Game time: 1:05 p.m. PST
- Game attendance: 68,948
- Referee: John Hussey
- TV announcers (Fox): Kenny Albert, Ronde Barber and Sara Walsh
- Recap, Game Book

Game information

**First quarter**

- TB – Ronald Jones 8-yard run (Matt Gay kick), 11:30. Buccaneers 7–0. **Drive: 7 plays, 75 yards, 3:30.**
- SEA – Tyler Lockett 19-yard pass from Russell Wilson (Jason Myers kick), 8:23. Tied 7–7. **Drive: 6 plays, 75 yards, 3:07.**
- TB – Breshad Perriman 15-yard pass from Jameis Winston (Matt Gay kick), 0:48. Buccaneers 14–7. **Drive: 9 plays, 69 yards, 4:39.**

**Second quarter**

- TB – Mike Evans 5-yard pass from Jameis Winston (Matt Gay kick), 4:32. Buccaneers 21–7. **Drive: 12 plays, 63 yards, 6:31.**
- SEA – Jacob Hollister 1-yard pass from Russell Wilson (kick failed, wide right), 0:29. Buccaneers 21–13. **Drive: 4 plays, 60 yards, 1:14.**

**Third quarter**

- SEA – Tyler Lockett 2-yard pass from Russell Wilson (Russell Wilson-DK Metcalf pass), 8:03. Tied 21–21. **Drive: 5 plays, 85 yards, 2:46.**
- TB – Matt Gay 41-yard field goal, 3:18. Buccaneers 24–21. **Drive: 10 plays, 52 yards, 4:45.**
- SEA – Jason Myers 37-yard field goal, 14:26. Tied 24–24. **Drive: 9 plays, 56 yards, 3:52.**

**Fourth quarter**

- SEA – Jason Myers 22-yard field goal, 8:19. Seahawks 27–24. **Drive: 6 plays, 11 yards, 2:19.**
- TB – Matt Gay 45-yard field goal, 5:22. Tied 27–27. **Drive: 6 plays, 44 yards, 2:57.**
- SEA – DK Metcalf 53-yard pass from Russell Wilson (Jason Myers kick), 4:25. Seahawks 34–27. **Drive: 3 plays, 75 yards, 0:57.**
- TB – Dare Ogunbowale 1-yard run (Matt Gay kick), 0:46. Tied 34–34. **Drive: 10 plays, 75 yards, 3:39.**

**Overtime**

- SEA – Jacob Hollister 10-yard pass from Russell Wilson, 6:22. Seahawks 40–34. **Drive: 10 plays, 75 yards, 3:38.**

**Top passers**

- TB – Jameis Winston – 29/44, 335 yards, 2 TD
- SEA – Russell Wilson – 29/43, 378 yards, 5 TD

**Top rushers**

- TB – Ronald Jones – 18 rushes, 67 yards, TD
- SEA – Chris Carson – 16 rushes, 105 yards

**Top receivers**

- TB – Mike Evans – 12 receptions, 180 yards, TD
- SEA – Tyler Lockett – 13 receptions, 152 yards, 2 TD

==== Week 10: at San Francisco 49ers ====
Week Ten: Seattle Seahawks at San Francisco 49ers – Game summary

Quarter	1	2	3	4	OT	Total
**Seahawks**	0	7	14	3	3	**27**
49ers	10	0	0	14	0	**24**

at Levi's Stadium, Santa Clara, California

- Date: November 11
- Game time: 5:15 p.m. PST
- Game weather: Mostly clear, 77 °F (25 °C)
- Game attendance: 71,404
- Referee: Alex Kemp
- TV announcers (ESPN): Joe Tessitore, Booger McFarland and Lisa Salters
- Recap, Game Book

Game information

**First quarter**

- SF – Chase McLaughlin 43-yard field goal, 8:19. 49ers 3–0. **Drive: 13 plays, 50 yards, 6:41.**
- SF – Kendrick Bourne 10-yard pass from Jimmy Garoppolo (Chase McLaughlin kick), 2:03. 49ers 10–0. **Drive: 7 plays, 83 yards, 4:14.**

**Second quarter**

- SEA – Jadeveon Clowney 10-yard fumble return (Jason Myers kick), 2:51. 49ers 10–7.

**Third quarter**

- SEA – Jacob Hollister 3-yard pass from Russell Wilson (Jason Myers kick), 4:37. Seahawks 14–10. **Drive: 3 plays, 16 yards, 1:30.**
- SEA – Chris Carson 1-yard run (Jason Myers kick), 1:42. Seahawks 21–10. **Drive: 4 plays, 24 yards, 1:57.**

**Fourth quarter**

- SF – DeForest Buckner 12-yard fumble return (Jimmy Garoppolo–Kendrick Bourne pass), 12:01. Seahawks 21–18.
- SF – Chase McLaughlin 39-yard field goal, 6:17. Tied 21–21. **Drive: 8 plays, 48 yards, 4:05.**
- SEA – Jason Myers 46-yard field goal, 1:45. Seahawks 24–21. **Drive: 11 plays, 47 yards, 4:32.**
- SF – Chase McLaughlin 47-yard field goal, 0:01. Tied 24–24. **Drive: 10 plays, 45 yards, 1:44.**

**Overtime**

- SEA – Jason Myers 42-yard field goal, 0:00. Seahawks 27–24. **Drive: 7 plays, 40 yards, 1:25.**
- SEA – Russell Wilson – 24/34, 234 yards, TD, INT
- SF – Jimmy Garoppolo – 24/46, 248 yards, TD, INT

**Top rushers**

- SEA – Chris Carson – 25 rushes, 89 yards, TD
- SF – Tevin Coleman – 9 rushes, 40 yards

**Top receivers**

- SEA – DK Metcalf – 6 receptions, 70 yards
- SF – Deebo Samuel – 8 receptions, 112 yards

==== Week 12: at Philadelphia Eagles ====
Week Twelve: Seattle Seahawks at Philadelphia Eagles – Game summary

Quarter	1	2	3	4	Total
**Seahawks**	7	3	0	7	**17**
Eagles	3	0	0	6	**9**

at Lincoln Financial Field, Philadelphia, Pennsylvania

- Date: November 24
- Game time: 10:00 a.m. PST/1:00 p.m. EST
- Game weather: Rain, 40 °F (4 °C)
- Game attendance: 69,796
- Referee: Walt Anderson
- TV announcers (Fox): Kevin Burkhardt, Charles Davis and Pam Oliver
- Recap, Game Book

Game information

**First quarter**

- PHI – Jake Elliott 28-yard field goal, 7:29. Eagles 3–0. **Drive: 9 plays, 33 yards, 4:23.**
- SEA – Malik Turner 33-yard pass from Russell Wilson (Jason Myers kick), 5:54. Seahawks 7–3. **Drive: 4 plays, 75 yards, 1:35.**

**Second quarter**

- SEA – Jason Myers 24-yard field goal, 7:13. Seahawks 10–3. **Drive: 11 plays, 77 yards, 6:14.**

**Third quarter**

- No scoring plays.

**Fourth quarter**

- SEA – Rashaad Penny 58-yard run, 11:56. Seahawks 17–3. **Drive: 7 plays, 88 yards, 4:10.**
- PHI – Zach Ertz 2-yard pass from Carson Wentz (run failed), 0:20. Seahawks 17–9. **Drive: 8 plays, 80 yards, 2:03.**

**Top passers**

- SEA – Russell Wilson – 13/25, 200 yards, TD, INT
- PHI – Carson Wentz – 33/45, 256 yards, TD, 2 INT

**Top rushers**

- SEA – Rashaad Penny – 14 rushes, 129 yards, TD
- PHI – Miles Sanders – 12 rushes, 63 yards

**Top receivers**

- SEA – Chris Carson – 4 receptions, 31 yards
- PHI – Zach Ertz – 12 receptions, 91 yards, TD

==== Week 13: vs. Minnesota Vikings ====
Week Thirteen: Minnesota Vikings at Seattle Seahawks – Game summary

Quarter	1	2	3	4	Total
Vikings	7	10	0	13	**30**
**Seahawks**	7	3	17	10	**37**

at CenturyLink Field, Seattle, Washington

- Date: December 2
- Game time: 5:15 p.m. PST
- Game weather: Clear 51 °F (11 °C)
- Game attendance: 69,080
- Referee: Clete Blakeman
- TV announcers (ESPN): Joe Tessitore, Booger McFarland, Lisa Salters and John Parry
- Recap, Game Book

Game information

**First quarter**

- MIN – Dalvin Cook 2-yard run (Dan Bailey kick), 8:12. Vikings 7–0. **Drive: 6 plays, 83 yards, 3:31.**
- SEA – Chris Carson 1-yard run (Jason Myers kick), 0:11. Tied 7–7. **Drive: 14 plays, 75 yards, 8:01.**

**Second quarter**

- MIN – Anthony Harris 20-yard interception return (Dan Bailey kick), 5:09. Vikings 14–7.
- SEA – Jason Myers 29-yard field goal, 0:58. Vikings 14–10. **Drive: 10 plays, 62 yards, 4:05.**
- MIN – Dan Bailey 47-yard field goal, 0:00. Vikings 17–10. **Drive: 8 plays, 46 yards, 0:58.**

**Third quarter**

- SEA – Rashaad Penny 1-yard run (Jason Myers kick), 9:02. Tied 17–17. **Drive: 9 plays, 71 yards, 4:20.**
- SEA – Jason Myers 29-yard field goal, 5:46. Seahawks 20–17. **Drive: 7 plays, 15 yards, 3:04.**
- SEA – David Moore 60-yard pass from Russell Wilson (Jason Myers kick), 0:05. Seahawks 27–17. **Drive: 5 plays, 76 yards, 2:54.**

**Fourth quarter**

- SEA – Rashaad Penny 13-yard pass from Russell Wilson (Jason Myers kick), 13:30. Seahawks 34–17. **Drive: 3 plays, 25 yards, 1:25.**
- MIN – Laquon Treadwell 58-yard pass from Kirk Cousins (Dan Bailey kick), 12:49. Seahawks 34–24. **Drive: 3 plays, 75 yards, 0:41.**
- MIN – Kyle Rudolph 3-yard pass from Kirk Cousins (kick failed), 7:14. Seahawks 34–30. **Drive: 8 plays, 72 yards, 2:20.**
- SEA – Jason Myers 36-yard field goal, 0:21. Seahawks 37–30. **Drive: 7 plays, 24 yards, 2:06.**

**Top passers**

- MIN – Kirk Cousins – 22/38, 276 yards, 2 TD, INT
- SEA – Russell Wilson – 21/31, 240 yards, 2 TD, INT

**Top rushers**

- MIN – Dalvin Cook – 9 rushes, 29 yards, TD
- SEA – Chris Carson – 23 rushes, 102 yards, TD

**Top receivers**

- MIN – Alexander Mattison – 4 receptions, 51 yards
- SEA – DK Metcalf – 6 receptions, 75 yards

==== Week 14: at Los Angeles Rams ====
Week Fourteen: Seattle Seahawks at Los Angeles Rams – Game summary

Quarter	1	2	3	4	Total
Seahawks	3	0	6	3	**12**
**Rams**	7	14	0	7	**28**

at Los Angeles Memorial Coliseum, Los Angeles, California

- Date: December 8
- Game time: 5:20 p.m. PST
- Game weather: Cloudy, 60 °F (16 °C)
- Game attendance: 71,501
- Referee: Shawn Hochuli
- TV announcers (NBC): Al Michaels, Cris Collinsworth and Michele Tafoya
- Recap, Game Book

Game information

**First quarter**

- SEA – Jason Myers 39-yard field goal, 8:34. Seahawks 3–0. **Drive: 11 plays, 54 yards, 6:26.**
- LAR – Malcolm Brown 1-yard run (Greg Zuerlein kick), 5:08. Rams 7–3. **Drive: 8 plays, 75 yards, 3:26.**

**Second quarter**

- LAR – Robert Woods 2-yard pass from Jared Goff (Greg Zuerlein kick), 11:28. Rams 14–3. **Drive: 12 plays, 85 yards, 6:29.**
- LAR – Cooper Kupp 10-yard pass from Jared Goff (Greg Zuerlein kick), 0:51. Rams 21–3. **Drive: 10 plays, 72 yards, 3:13.**

**Third quarter**

- SEA – Quandre Diggs 55-yard interception return (kick failed, wide left), 12:54. Rams 21–9.

**Fourth quarter**

- LAR – Todd Gurley 7-yard run (Greg Zuerlein kick), 11:07. Rams 28–9. **Drive: 7 plays, 95 yards, 3:40.**
- SEA – Jason Myers 34-yard field goal, 7:03. Rams 28–12. **Drive: 13 plays, 59 yards, 4:04.**

**Top passers**

- SEA – Russell Wilson – 22/36, 245 yards, INT
- LAR – Jared Goff – 22/31, 293 yards, 2 TD, 2 INT

**Top rushers**

- SEA – Chris Carson – 15 rushes, 76 yards
- LAR – Todd Gurley – 23 rushes, 79 yards, TD

**Top receivers**

- SEA – DK Metcalf – 6 receptions, 78 yards
- LAR – Tyler Higbee – 7 receptions, 116 yards

==== Week 15: at Carolina Panthers ====
Week Fifteen: Seattle Seahawks at Carolina Panthers – Game summary

Quarter	1	2	3	4	Total
**Seahawks**	13	7	3	7	**30**
Panthers	0	7	3	14	**24**

at Bank of America Stadium, Charlotte, North Carolina

- Date: December 15
- Game time: 10:00 a.m. PST/1:00 p.m. EST
- Game weather: Sunny, 56 °F (13 °C)
- Game attendance: 72,544
- Referee: Carl Cheffers
- TV announcers (Fox): Kenny Albert and Ronde Barber
- Recap, Game Book

Game information

**First quarter**

- SEA – Chris Carson 16-yard run (kick failed, hit right upright), 10:26. Seahawks 6–0. **Drive: 8 plays, 75 yards, 4:34.**
- SEA – DK Metcalf 19-yard pass from Russell Wilson (Jason Myers kick), 5:22. Seahawks 13–0. **Drive: 8 plays, 80 yards, 4:20.**

**Second quarter**

- CAR – Christian McCaffrey 1-yard run (Joey Slye kick), 13:43. Seahawks 13–7. **Drive: 12 plays, 75 yards, 6:39.**
- SEA – Tyler Lockett 19-yard pass from Russell Wilson (Jason Myers kick), 10:09. Seahawks 20–7. **Drive: 6 plays, 75 yards, 3:34.**

**Third quarter**

- CAR – Joey Slye 52-yard field goal, 11:35. Seahawks 20–10. **Drive: 9 plays, 41 yards, 3:25.**
- SEA – Jason Myers 30-yard field goal, 0:28. Seahawks 23–10. **Drive: 4 plays, 9 yards, 2:27.**

**Fourth quarter**

- SEA – Chris Carson 6-yard run (Jason Myers kick), 7:18. Seahawks 30–10. **Drive: 11 plays, 82 yards, 6:22.**
- CAR – Christian McCaffrey 15-yard run (Joey Slye kick), 4:53. Seahawks 30–17. **Drive: 9 plays, 75 yards, 2:25.**
- CAR – Curtis Samuel 5-yard pass from Kyle Allen (Joey Slye kick), 3:14. Seahawks 30–24. **Drive: 7 plays, 84 yards, 1:11.**

**Top passers**

- SEA – Russell Wilson – 20/26, 286 yards, 2 TD
- CAR – Kyle Allen – 25/41, 277 yards, TD, 3 INT

**Top rushers**

- SEA – Chris Carson – 24 rushes, 133 yards, 2 TD
- CAR – Christian McCaffrey – 19 rushes, 87 yards, 2 TD

**Top receivers**

- SEA – Tyler Lockett – 8 receptions, 120 yards, TD
- CAR – D. J. Moore – 8 receptions, 113 yards

==== Week 16: vs. Arizona Cardinals ====
Week Sixteen: Arizona Cardinals at Seattle Seahawks – Game summary

Quarter	1	2	3	4	Total
**Cardinals**	7	10	3	7	**27**
Seahawks	7	0	0	6	**13**

at CenturyLink Field, Seattle, Washington

- Date: December 22
- Game time: 1:25 p.m. PST
- Game weather: Cloudy, 43 °F (6 °C)
- Game attendance: 69,022
- Referee: Brad Rogers
- TV announcers (Fox): Chris Myers, Daryl Johnston and Laura Okmin
- Recap, Game Book

Game information

**First quarter**

- SEA – Nick Bellore 3-yard pass from Russell Wilson (Jason Myers kick), 8:50. Seahawks 7–0. **Drive: 9 plays, 89 yards, 4:37.**
- ARI – Kenyan Drake 80-yard run (Zane Gonzalez kick), 8:33. Tied 7–7. **Drive: 1 play, 80 yards, 0:17.**

**Second quarter**

- ARI – Larry Fitzgerald 21-yard pass from Kyler Murray (Zane Gonzalez kick), 4:16. Cardinals 14–7. **Drive: 5 plays, 54 yards, 2:41.**
- ARI – Zane Gonzalez 22-yard field goal, 0:22. Cardinals 17–7. **Drive: 11 plays, 51 yards, 2:04.**

**Third quarter**

- ARI – Zane Gonzalez 46-yard field goal, 11:36. Cardinals 20–7. **Drive: 6 plays, 37 yards, 2:25.**

**Fourth quarter**

- SEA – Jason Myers 30-yard field goal, 14:56. Cardinals 20–10. **Drive: 4 plays, 4 yards, 1:12.**
- SEA – Jason Myers 51-yard field goal, 10:02. Cardinals 20–13. **Drive: 8 plays, 42 yards, 2:02.**
- ARI – Kenyan Drake 3-yard run (Zane Gonzalez kick), 4:18. Cardinals 27–13. **Drive: 9 plays, 78 yards, 5:44.**

**Top passers**

- ARI – Kyler Murray – 11/18, 118 yards, TD
- SEA – Russell Wilson – 16/31, 169 yards, TD

**Top rushers**

- ARI – Kenyan Drake – 24 rushes, 166 yards, 2 TD
- SEA – Chris Carson – 8 rushes, 40 yards

**Top receivers**

- ARI – Larry Fitzgerald – 4 receptions, 48 yards
- SEA – Travis Homer – 6 receptions, 26 yards

==== Week 17: vs. San Francisco 49ers ====
Week Seventeen: San Francisco 49ers at Seattle Seahawks – Game summary

Quarter	1	2	3	4	Total
**49ers**	10	3	6	7	**26**
Seahawks	0	0	7	14	**21**

at CenturyLink Field, Seattle, Washington

- Date: December 29
- Game time: 5:20 p.m. PST
- Game weather: Partly cloudy, 51 °F (11 °C)
- Game attendance: 69,162
- Referee: Tony Corrente
- TV announcers (NBC): Al Michaels, Cris Collinsworth, Michele Tafoya and Terry McAulay
- Recap, Game Book

Game information

**First quarter**

- SF – Robbie Gould 47-yard field goal, 7:35. 49ers 3–0. **Drive: 10 plays, 50 yards, 6:14.**
- SF – Deebo Samuel 30-yard run (Robbie Gould kick), 0:24. 49ers 10–0. **Drive: 8 plays, 94 yards, 4:32.**

**Second quarter**

- SF – Robbie Gould 30-yard field goal, 5:44. 49ers 13–0. **Drive: 11 plays, 71 yards, 5:43.**

**Third quarter**

- SEA – Tyler Lockett 14-yard pass from Russell Wilson (Jason Myers kick), 5:46. 49ers 13–7. **Drive: 11 plays, 62 yards, 7:07.**
- SF – Raheem Mostert 2-yard run (pass failed) 3:25. 49ers 19–7. **Drive: 5 plays, 75 yards, 2:21.**

**Fourth quarter**

- SEA – Marshawn Lynch 1-yard run (Jason Myers kick), 9:55. 49ers 19–14. **Drive: 14 plays, 75 yards, 8:30.**
- SF – Raheem Mostert 13-yard run (Robbie Gold Kick) 5:51. 49ers 26–14. **Drive: 7 plays, 75 yards, 4:04.**
- SEA – DK Metcalf 14-yard pass from Russell Wilson (Jason Myers kick), 3:36. 49ers 26–21. **Drive: 7 plays, 60 yards, 2:15.**

**Top passers**

- SF – Jimmy Garoppolo – 18/22, 285 yards
- SEA – Russell Wilson – 25/40, 233 yards, 2 TD

**Top rushers**

- SF – Raheem Mostert – 10 rushes, 57 yards, 2 TD
- SEA – Travis Homer – 10 rushes, 62 yards

**Top receivers**

- SF – Deebo Samuel – 5 receptions, 102 yards
- SEA – DK Metcalf – 6 receptions, 81 yards, TD

=== Standings ===
==== Division ====
NFC West
	W	L	T	PCT	DIV	CONF	PF	PA	STK
^{(1)} San Francisco 49ers	13	3	0	.813	5–1	10–2	479	310	W2
^{(5)} Seattle Seahawks	11	5	0	.688	3–3	8–4	405	398	L2
Los Angeles Rams	9	7	0	.563	3–3	7–5	394	364	W1
Arizona Cardinals	5	10	1	.344	1–5	3–8–1	361	442	L1

==== Conference ====
NFC
#	Team	Division	W	L	T	PCT	DIV	CONF	SOS	SOV	STK
**Division leaders**
1 (Note: San Francisco finished ahead of Green Bay and New Orleans based on head-to-head sweep, claiming the No. 1 seed.)	San Francisco 49ers	West	13	3	0	.813	5–1	10–2	.504	.466	W2
2 (Note: Green Bay claimed the No. 2 seed over New Orleans based on conference record.)	Green Bay Packers	North	13	3	0	.813	6–0	10–2	.453	.428	W5
3	New Orleans Saints	South	13	3	0	.813	5–1	9–3	.486	.459	W3
4	Philadelphia Eagles	East	9	7	0	.563	5–1	7–5	.455	.417	W4
**Wild Cards**
5	Seattle Seahawks	West	11	5	0	.688	3–3	8–4	.531	.463	L2
6	Minnesota Vikings	North	10	6	0	.625	2–4	7–5	.477	.356	L2
**Did not qualify for the postseason**
7	Los Angeles Rams	West	9	7	0	.563	3–3	7–5	.535	.438	W1
8 (Note: Chicago finished ahead of Dallas based on head-to-head victory.)	Chicago Bears	North	8	8	0	.500	4–2	7–5	.508	.383	W1
9	Dallas Cowboys	East	8	8	0	.500	5–1	7–5	.479	.316	W1
10 (Note: Atlanta finished ahead of Tampa Bay based on division record.)	Atlanta Falcons	South	7	9	0	.438	4–2	6–6	.545	.518	W4
11	Tampa Bay Buccaneers	South	7	9	0	.438	2–4	5–7	.500	.384	L2
12	Arizona Cardinals	West	5	10	1	.344	1–5	3–8–1	.529	.375	L1
13	Carolina Panthers	South	5	11	0	.313	1–5	2–10	.549	.469	L8
14	New York Giants	East	4	12	0	.250	2–4	3–9	.473	.281	L1
15	Detroit Lions	North	3	12	1	.219	0–6	2–9–1	.506	.375	L9
16	Washington Redskins	East	3	13	0	.188	0–6	2–10	.502	.281	L4
**Tiebreakers** (Note: When breaking ties for three or more teams under the NFL's rules, they are first broken within divisions, then comparing only the highest-ranked remaining team from each division.)

== Postseason ==
=== Schedule ===
Round	Date	Opponent (seed)	Result	Record	Venue	Recap
Wild Card	January 5, 2020	at Philadelphia Eagles (4)	W 17–9	1–0	Lincoln Financial Field	Recap
Divisional	January 12, 2020	at Green Bay Packers (2)	L 23–28	1–1	Lambeau Field	Recap

=== Game summaries ===
==== NFC Wild Card Playoffs: at (4) Philadelphia Eagles ====
NFC Wild Card Playoffs: (5) Seattle Seahawks at (4) Philadelphia Eagles – Game summary

Quarter	1	2	3	4	Total
Seahawks	3	7	7	0	17
Eagles	0	3	6	0	9

at Lincoln Financial Field, Philadelphia, Pennsylvania

- Date: January 5, 2020
- Game time: 1:40 p.m. PST/4:40 p.m. EST
- Game weather: Cloudy, 41 °F (5 °C)
- Game attendance: 69,796
- Referee: Shawn Smith
- TV announcers (NBC): Al Michaels, Cris Collinsworth and Michele Tafoya
- Recap, Game Book

Game information

First quarter

- SEA – Jason Myers 49-yard field goal, 1:29. Seahawks 3–0. Drive: 10 plays, 46 yards, 4:48.

Second quarter

- PHI – Jake Elliott 46-yard field goal, 2:53. Tied 3–3. Drive: 13 plays, 64 yards, 5:53.
- SEA – Marshawn Lynch 5-yard run (Jason Myers kick), 1:06. Seahawks 10–3. Drive: 9 plays, 82 yards, 1:47.

Third quarter

- PHI – Jake Elliott 26-yard field goal, 10:36. Seahawks 10–6. Drive: 7 plays, 67 yards, 4:24.
- SEA – DK Metcalf 53-yard pass from Russell Wilson (Jason Myers kick), 8:46. Seahawks 17–6. Drive: 5 plays, 81 yards, 1:50.
- PHI – Jake Elliott 38-yard field goal, 2:49. Seahawks 17–9. Drive: 11 plays, 55 yards, 5:57.

Fourth quarter

- No scoring plays.

Top passers

- SEA – Russell Wilson – 18/30, 325 yards, TD
- PHI – Josh McCown – 18/24, 174 yards

Top rushers

- SEA – Russell Wilson – 9 rushes, 45 yards
- PHI – Miles Sanders – 14 rushes, 69 yards

Top receivers

- SEA – DK Metcalf – 7 receptions, 160 yards, TD
- PHI – Dallas Goedert – 7 receptions, 73 yards

==== NFC Divisional Playoffs: at (2) Green Bay Packers ====
NFC Divisional Playoffs: (5) Seattle Seahawks at (2) Green Bay Packers – Game summary

Quarter	1	2	3	4	Total
Seahawks	3	0	14	6	23
Packers	7	14	7	0	28

at Lambeau Field, Green Bay, Wisconsin

- Date: January 12, 2020
- Game time: 3:40 p.m. PST/5:40 p.m. CST
- Game weather: Cloudy, 23 °F (−5 °C)
- Game attendance: 78,998
- Referee: Clete Blakeman
- TV announcers (Fox): Joe Buck, Troy Aikman, Erin Andrews, Chris Myers and Mike Pereira
- Recap, Game Book

Game information

First quarter

- GB – Davante Adams 20-yard pass from Aaron Rodgers (Mason Crosby kick), 10:37. Packers 7–0. Drive: 8 plays, 75 yards, 4:23.
- SEA – Jason Myers 45-yard field goal, 0:28. Packers 7–3. Drive: 6 plays, 32 yards, 1:38.

Second quarter

- GB – Aaron Jones 1-yard run (Mason Crosby kick), 9:49. Packers 14–3. Drive: 9 plays, 75 yards, 5:39.
- GB – Aaron Jones 1-yard run (Mason Crosby kick), 1:30. Packers 21–3. Drive: 11 plays, 60 yards, 4:13.

Third quarter

- SEA – Marshawn Lynch 1-yard run (Jason Myers kick), 9:44. Packers 21–10. Drive: 10 plays, 69 yards, 5:16.
- GB – Davante Adams 40-yard pass from Aaron Rodgers (Mason Crosby kick), 7:09. Packers 28–10. Drive: 5 plays, 75 yards, 2:35.
- SEA – Tyler Lockett 7-yard pass from Russell Wilson (Jason Myers kick), 0:39. Packers 28–17. Drive: 12 plays, 84 yards, 6:30.

Fourth quarter

- SEA – Marshawn Lynch 1-yard run (pass failed), 9:33. Packers 28–23. Drive: 9 plays, 79 yards, 4:28.

Top passers

- SEA – Russell Wilson – 21/31, 277 yards, TD
- GB – Aaron Rodgers – 16/27, 243 yards, 2 TD

Top rushers

- SEA – Russell Wilson – 7 rushes, 64 yards
- GB – Aaron Jones – 21 rushes, 62 yards, 2 TD

Top receivers

- SEA – Tyler Lockett – 9 receptions, 136 yards, TD
- GB – Davante Adams – 8 receptions, 160 yards, 2 TD
