= Kyeong Kang =

South Korean baseball player

K.D. Kang
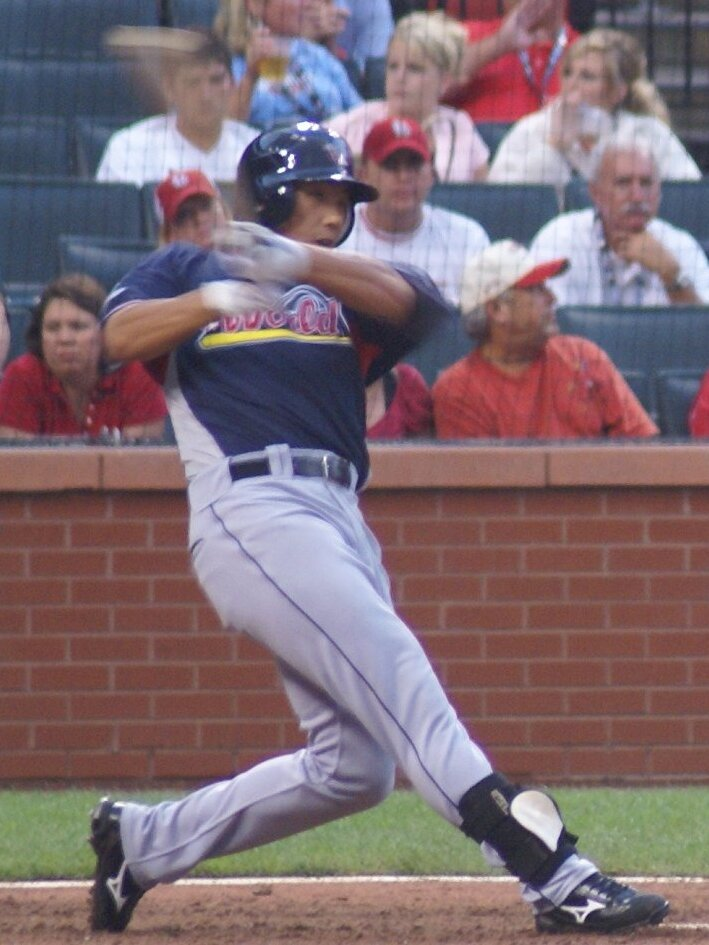
- Kang playing in the All-Star Futures Game in 2009
- Outfielder
- Born: February 9, 1988 (age 38); Busan, South Korea
- Bats: Left Throws: Left
- Stats at Baseball Reference
Korean name
| Hangul | 강경덕 |
| RR | Gang Gyeongdeok |
| MR | Kang Kyŏngdŏk |

Kyeong Duk Kang (Korean: 강경덕; born February 9, 1988) is a Korean American former professional baseball outfielder. He was the first South Korean-born baseball player to be selected in the MLB draft.

== Career ==
With his parents, Kang moved to the United States at age 14 from South Korea. They lived in Alabama, with his aunt for two years. They relocated to the Atlanta area, as his parents could not find work in Alabama. As his parents researched schools in the Atlanta area, they came upon an article on Jeff Francoeur, who graduated from Parkview High School, and decided to enroll Kang there. His parents moved back to South Korea after Kang's brother graduated from high school in 2007.

=== Tampa Bay Devil Rays / Tampa Bay Rays ===
The Tampa Bay Devil Rays selected Kang in the 15th round, 439th overall, of the 2006 Major League Baseball draft. He became the first South Korean-born baseball player to be selected in an MLB draft. Turning down scholarships from four-year colleges, such as the University of Georgia, Kang attended Chattahoochee Valley Community College, a junior college, where he played college baseball for one season. He signed with the Rays as a draft-and-follow prospect in prior to the 2007 draft. He initially requested a signing bonus of $1 million, but agreed to sign for $75,000.

Kang spent his first two professional seasons with the Princeton Rays in the Rookie-level Appalachian League and Hudson Valley Renegades in the Low-A New York–Penn League. In 2009, Kang played for the Bowling Green Hot Rods of the Single-A Midwest League, where he led the team with a .307 batting average. During the season, Bowling Green manager, Matt Quatraro raved about Kang's ability and potential: "He's just a good hitter. He is more of a double hitter than a home run hitter, but I can see him hitting 25 homers in the big leagues with a lot of doubles. He has that kind of power. He hasn't shown it yet, but it's there. Watch batting practice and you immediately see the way the ball comes off his bat. He's got a lot of raw talent." In this year, Kang represented the Rays in the All-Star Futures Game.,

In 2010, Kang was promoted once again, to the High-A affiliate Charlotte Stone Crabs in the Florida State League, however this year his batting average dropped over 60 points to .241, and he managed to hit only one home run. When speaking to Kang about the 2010 season, he said "I tried to muscle to ball too much and over swung too often. After having a good year this past season, I started to think too much about hitting home runs, and I think that got the best of me. Although that season was a huge disappointment, it allowed me to take a step back and not be too aggressive at the plate."

Beginning the 2011 season as a reserve with the Montgomery Biscuits of the Double-A Southern League, Kang played his way into a starting role by hitting 11 home runs in the 316 at bats. Diving deeper into the numbers, there was another encouraging sign from Kang in 2011. He had a line drive percentage of 25.6 which was the fourth highest rate in the entire system for players with more than 200 plate appearances. This is indicative of a return to a line drive approach at the plate that as you will see in his scouting report, is the natural result of his swing when he is going well at the dish. He opened the 2012 season with the Biscuits. Kang led the team with 14 homeruns in Double-A, but saw a jump in his strikeout rate, posting 135 strikeouts to 51 walks. He struggled particularly against left handed pitchers, batting just .111 in 90 at bats (.290 against righties in 255 at bats), while striking out 45 times to just 5 walks. In fact, all 14 of his homeruns came against right handed pitchers.

To start the 2013 season, Kang was demoted to High-A Charlotte, but quickly found himself back in Montgomery, after slashing .339/.426/.525 in 17 games. He once again led the team with 15 home runs, and also hit 17 doubles and 7 triples in Double-A. He became the first player to lead Montgomery in home runs in back-to-back seasons in 60 years. Between two levels, Kang recorded career highs in home runs (16), total bases (193), and also improved upon his weakness against lefties (.250 vs. 252). On November 4, 2013, Kang became a free agent.

=== Baltimore Orioles ===
On November 18, 2013, he signed a minor league contract with the Baltimore Orioles organization. He played for the Bowie Baysox of the Double-A Eastern League in 2014. The Baysox outfield was extremely crowded all-season long with player such as Dariel Álvarez, Ronald Bermudez, Chih-Hsien Chiang, and Kang struggled to find playing time during the month of April, only playing in 11 games. He was often benched against left handed pitchers, which made it harder for him to find his rhythm. However, with patience, Kang's numbers started looking better during the months of June (.333/.367/.533) and July (.293/.336/.424). Kang saw his numbers dip a bit during the month of August, but his offensive production flourished again towards the end of the season. During the five-game series against the Erie SeaWolves from Aug 25 to Aug 28, Kang hit four home runs to finish strong. Overall, Kang collected 106 hits in 376 at bats, with a slash line of .282/.338/.452 this season. He also had 37 extra base hits (22 doubles, 3 triples, 12 home runs), 37 RBI, 32 walks and 86 strikeouts. He elected free agency following the season on November 4.

=== Atlanta Braves ===
On November 21, 2014, Kang signed a minor league contract with the Atlanta Braves organization. He spent the 2015 season with the Double-A Mississippi Braves, playing in 119 games and hitting .271/.347/.384 with 6 home runs, 52 RBI, and 4 stolen bases. He was released by the Braves on March 30, 2016.

=== Fargo-Moorhead RedHawks ===
On May 3, 2016, Kang signed with the Fargo-Moorhead RedHawks of the American Association of Professional Baseball. Playing in 97 games for Fargo in 2016, he slashed .291/.395/.495 with 18 home runs and 61 RBI. In 2017, Kang played in 100 games for the team, batting .270/.354/.438 with 11 home runs and 50 RBI. After playing out his option that season, Kang became a free agent on October 1, 2017.
