= Josh Hart (baseball) =

American baseball player (born 1994)

- Outfielder
- Born: October 2, 1994 (age 32); Lilburn, Georgia, U.S.
- Bats: Left Throws: Left

Josh Hart (born October 2, 1994) is an American former professional baseball outfielder.

== Career ==
Hart was drafted by the Baltimore Orioles in the first round of the 2013 Major League Baseball draft out of Parkview High School in Lilburn, Georgia. He signed with the Orioles and made his professional debut with the rookie-level Gulf Coast League Orioles, where he spent most of 2013, slashing .228/.312/.301 in 33 games, before finishing the season with the Low-A Aberdeen IronBirds, playing three games for them. In February 2014, Orioles manager Buck Showalter asked Hart to write a one-page report on Frank Robinson, after Hart admitted that he did not know about Robinson.

Hart spent the 2014 season with the Single-A Delmarva Shorebirds, batting .255 with one home run and 28 RBI over 85 appearances. He missed time during the season due to a torn meniscus. In 2015, Hart played for the High-A Frederick Keys where he batted .255/.282/.311 with one home run, 28 RBI, and 30 stolen bases in 104 games. In 2016, he returned to Frederick, where he slashed .223/.282/.320 with career-highs in home runs (4) and RBI (31), as well as nine stolen bases across 97 games.

In 2017, Hart played in only 38 games split between Aberdeen, Frederick, and the GCL Orioles, due to an ankle injury, and slashed a combined .270/.336/.421 with one home run, 13 RBI, and four stolen bases. Hart was released by the Orioles organization on March 29, 2018.
