= Parkview High School (Georgia) =

Public high school near Lilburn in Gwinnett County, Georgia, United States

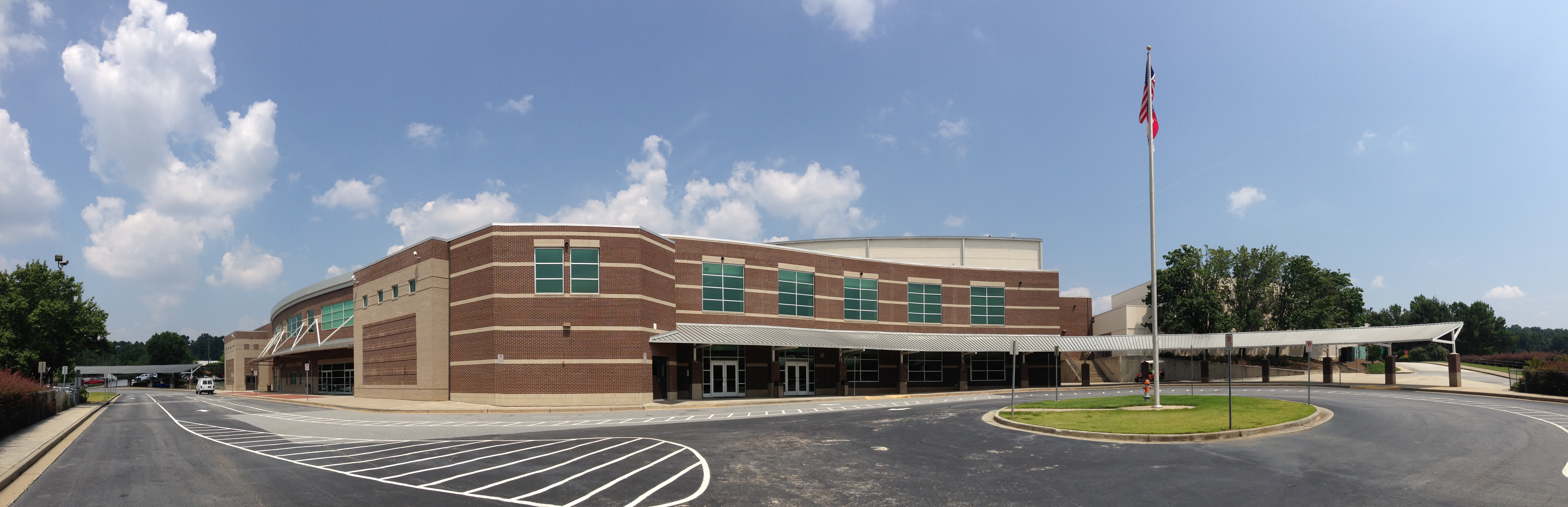
- Panorama of the front of the main building, August 2013

Location
- 998 Cole Drive; Lilburn, Georgia 30047; United States; 33°51′34″N 84°06′50″W

Information
- Type: Public
- Established: 1976
- School district: Gwinnett County Public Schools
- Principal: David T. Smith
- Teaching staff: 172.60 (FTE)
- Grades: 9–12
- Enrollment: 3,216 (2024–2025)
- Student to teacher ratio: 18.63
- Campus: Suburban
- Colors: Orange, White, and Blue
- Athletics conference: GHSA AAAAAAA
- Mascot: Panther
- Rival: Brookwood High School
- Newspaper: The Parkview Pantera
- Website: parkviewhs.gcpsk12.org

Parkview High School is a public high school located near Lilburn in Gwinnett County, Georgia, United States. It is operated by Gwinnett County Public Schools. The current principal is David T. Smith.

== School-initiated organizations ==
=== Student Council ===
Parkview High School has a student council composed of class officers and student council representatives. The student council maintains contact with the Georgia House representative and takes a trip to the State Capitol once a year.

=== School newspaper ===
The Parkview Pantera is a student newspaper published between 4 and 7 times per school year. Parkview students write articles and lay out the paper under the guidance of the newspaper teacher. Numerous Pantera staff members have gone on to study journalism in college.

== Academics ==
Parkview was recognized by the Department of Education as a Blue Ribbon School for the 1984–1985 school year.

== Music and arts ==
=== Band ===
In 2005, Parkview High School Band was awarded the John Philip Sousa Foundation's Sudler Flag of Honor. Parkview is one of four schools in the state of Georgia and 68 in the world to receive this award.

Parkview has also been placed on the Historic Roll of Honor of High School Concert Bands. This list recognizes "historic high school concert bands of very particular musical excellence." The Georgia State Legislature passed Georgia Senate Resolution 1313 and Georgia House Resolution 2063, honoring the Parkview High School Band.

== Notable alumni ==
- Mark Thomas (1987), NFL defensive end
- Tatiana Prowell (1990), oncologist
- Brett Conway (1993), NFL kicker
- Lennon Parham (1994), actress
- Shay Warakomski (1994), Space Force general
- Matt Stinchcomb (1995), NFL offensive tackle, College Football Hall of Famer
- Josh Wolff (1995), soccer player who played for the USMNT
- Ainsley Battles (1996), NFL safety
- Jason Moore (1997), MLS player
- Jeff Keppinger (1998), MLB infielder
- Jon Stinchcomb (1998), NFL Pro Bowl offensive tackle
- Seth Marler (1999), NFL kicker
- Ken Butler III (2000), NASCAR driver
- Kate Michael (2000), Miss District of Columbia 2006
- Clint Sammons (2001), MLB catcher
- Eric Shanteau (2001), Olympic Gold medalist swimmer
- Jeff Francoeur (2002), MLB outfielder
- Justin Moore (2002), MLS player
- Graham Neff (2002), athletics director for the Clemson Tigers
- Brett Butler (2003), NASCAR driver
- Brad Lester (2003), CFL running back
- Kyeong Kang (2006), baseball outfielder
- Michael Palmer (2006), NFL tight end
- Caleb King (2007), NFL running back
- Matt Olson (2012), All-Star first baseman for the Atlanta Braves
- Chris Carson (2013), NFL running back
- Josh Hart (2013), baseball outfielder
- Mac Marshall (2014), baseball pitcher
- Logan Cerny (2018), outfielder in the Houston Astros organization
- Demarius Smith (2017), USA Professional Track and Field Oklahoma Sooners
- Malik Washington (2019), wide receiver for the Miami Dolphins
- Julian Ashby (2020), long snapper for the New England Patriots
- CJ Daniels (2020), wide receiver for the Los Angeles Rams
- Jared Brown (2021), wide receiver for the South Carolina Gamecocks
- Jason Edwards (2021), basketball player for the Providence Friars
- Miles Kelly (2021), basketball player for the Dallas Mavericks
- Colin Houck (2023), infielder in the New York Mets organization
- Jalyn Crawford (2024), cornerback for the Ole Miss Rebels
- Mike Matthews (2024), wide receiver for the Tennessee Volunteers

== See also ==
- Gwinnett County Public Schools
