= 2019 Arizona Cardinals season =

100th season in franchise history

- Owner: Bill Bidwill (died on October 2, 2019); Michael Bidwill (October 3, 2019 onward)
- General manager: Steve Keim
- Head coach: Kliff Kingsbury
- Home stadium: State Farm Stadium

Results
- Record: 5–10–1
- Division place: 4th NFC West
- Playoffs: Did not qualify
- All-Pros: OLB Chandler Jones (1st team)
- Pro Bowlers: FS Budda Baker; OLB Chandler Jones

Uniform
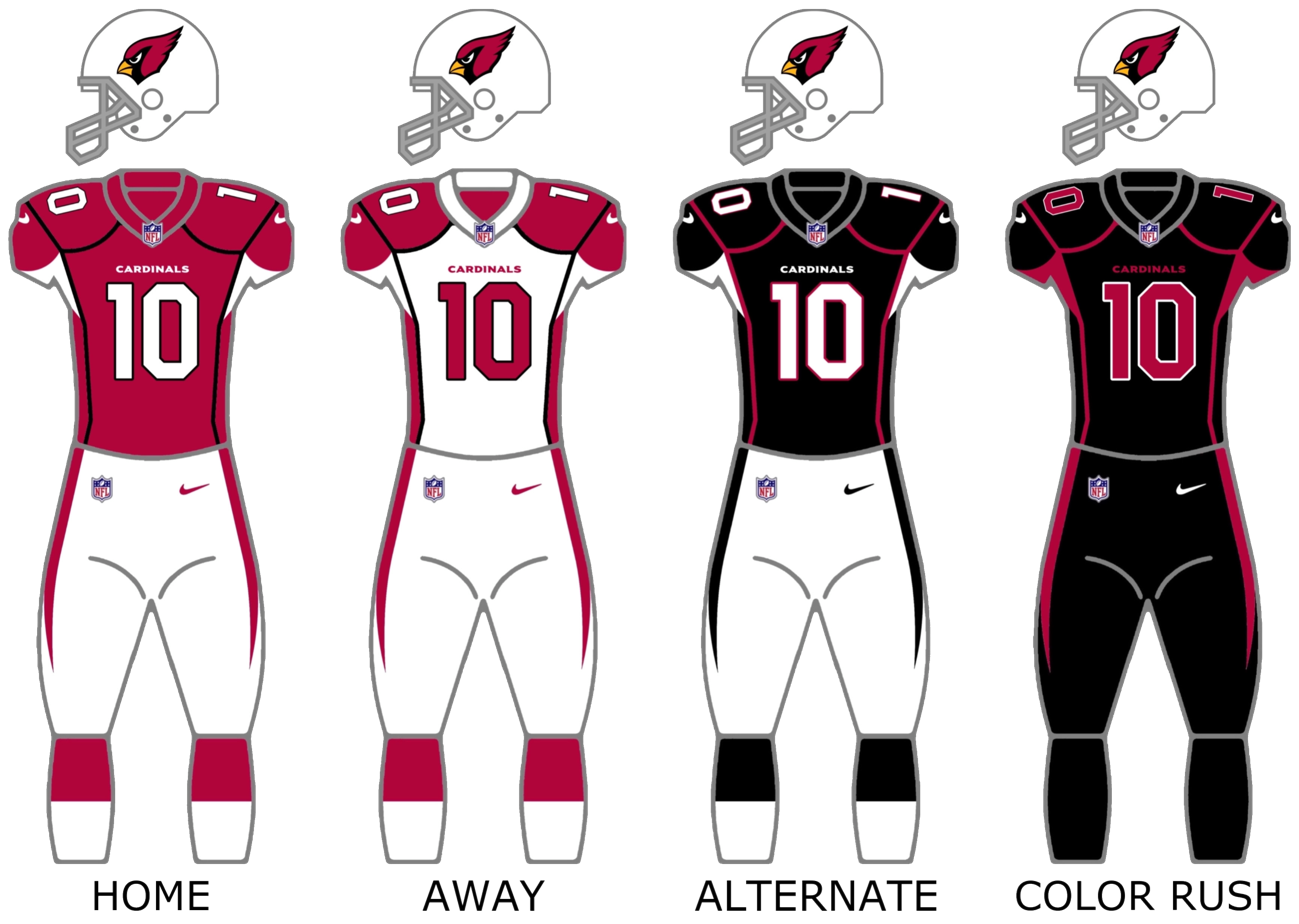

The 2019 season was the Arizona Cardinals' 100th in the National Football League (NFL), their 32nd in Arizona and their first under head coach Kliff Kingsbury, following the firing of former head coach Steve Wilks the previous season. During the offseason, the Cardinals' home stadium was renamed from University of Phoenix Stadium to State Farm Stadium. The Cardinals were one of two current teams, along with the Chicago Bears, who were among the 14 charter members of the American Professional Football Association, which later became the NFL, that celebrated its 100th season in 2019.

This was also the first season with quarterback Kyler Murray, who was drafted first overall to be the starting quarterback as the Cardinals then traded previous starter Josh Rosen away after just one season. The Cardinals improved on their 3–13 campaign in 2018. However, they were mathematically eliminated from playoff contention for the fourth straight season after a Week 13 loss to the Los Angeles Rams.

Bill Bidwill, who had owned the team since 1972, died on October 2, 2019, at the age of 88.

== Offseason ==
=== Signings ===
2019 Arizona Cardinals free agent signings
Position	Player	Age	2018 team	Contract
CB	Robert Alford	30	Atlanta Falcons	3 years, $22.5 million
OLB	Brooks Reed	31	Atlanta Falcons	1 years, $1.625 million
TE	Charles Clay	30	Buffalo Bills	1 year, $2 million
OLB	Terrell Suggs	36	Baltimore Ravens	1 year, $7 million
QB	Brett Hundley	25	Seattle Seahawks	1 year, $1.875 million
ILB	Jordan Hicks	26	Philadelphia Eagles	4-year, $34 million
DT	Darius Philon	25	Los Angeles Chargers	2-year, $10 million
G	J. R. Sweezy	29	Seattle Seahawks	2-year, $9 million

=== Draft ===
2019 Arizona Cardinals draft
Round	Pick	Player	Position	College	Notes
1	1	Kyler Murray *	QB	Oklahoma	
2	33	Byron Murphy	CB	Washington	
2	62	Andy Isabella	WR	Massachusetts	From Miami via New Orleans
3	65	Zach Allen	DE	Boston College	
4	103	Hakeem Butler	WR	Iowa State	
5	139	Deionte Thompson	S	Alabama	
6	174	Keesean Johnson	WR	Fresno State	
6	179	Lamont Gaillard	C	Georgia	From Tampa Bay
7	248	Joshua Miles	T	Morgan State	Compensatory pick
7	249	Michael Dogbe	DE	Temple	Compensatory pick
7	254	Caleb Wilson	TE	UCLA	Compensatory pick
Made roster * Made at least one Pro Bowl during career

Notes

- As the result of a negative differential of free agent signings and departures that the Cardinals experienced during the 2018 free agency period, the team received four compensatory selections for the 2019 draft.

Draft trades

- The Cardinals traded their seventh-round selection and the rights to former head coach Bruce Arians to the Tampa Bay Buccaneers in exchange for the Buccaneers' sixth-round selection.
- The Cardinals received a second-round pick from the Miami Dolphins, number 62 overall, and a 2020 fifth-round pick in exchange for quarterback Josh Rosen.

Supplemental draft

The Cardinals selected Washington State safety Jalen Thompson in the fifth round of the 2019 supplemental draft that was held on July 10. As a result, the Cardinals forfeited their fifth-round selection during the 2020 draft.

Roster changes

In addition to receiving the number one overall draft pick, the Cardinals also had the top spot on the waiver wire by virtue of having the worst record in the NFL during the 2018 season. The Cardinals picked up Pharoh Cooper (wide receiver, previously from the Los Angeles Rams), D. J. Swearinger (safety, previously from the Washington Redskins), Tanner Vallejo (linebacker, previously from the Cleveland Browns), Robert Alford (cornerback, previously from the Atlanta Falcons), Brooks Reed (outside linebacker, previously from the Atlanta Falcons), and Charles Clay (tight end, previously from the Buffalo Bills). The Cardinals' three quarterbacks from 2018, Sam Bradford, Mike Glennon, and Josh Rosen, did not return for 2019. Bradford decided he had played his final NFL game, Glennon left to go to the Oakland Raiders, and Rosen left to go to the Miami Dolphins.

== Staff ==
2019 Arizona Cardinals staff
Front office: Owner – Bidwill family; Chairman/president – Michael Bidwill; General manager – Steve Keim; Director of player personnel – Quentin Harris; Assistant director of player personnel – Dru Grigson; Vice president of player personnel – Terry McDonough; Director of college scouting – Chris Culmer; Director of pro scouting – Adrian Wilson; Director of football administration – Matt Harriss; Director of football operations – Matt Caracciolo; Head coaches: Head coach – Kliff Kingsbury; Assistant head coach/special teams coordinator – Jeff Rodgers; Offensive coaches: Pass game coordinator/quarterbacks – Tom Clements; Assistant quarterbacks – Cameron Turner; Running backs – James Saxon; Wide receivers – David Raih; Assistant wide receivers – Peter Badovinac; Tight ends – Steve Heiden; Offensive line – Sean Kugler; Assistant offensive line – Brian Natkin; Offensive quality control – Spencer Whipple; Offensive assistant – Jerry Sullivan; Bill bidwill coaching fellowship/running backs – Don Shumpert	Defensive coaches: Defensive coordinator – Vance Joseph; Defensive line – Chris Achuff; Linebackers – Billy Davis; Assistant linebackers – Charlie Bullen; Defensive backs – Marcus Robertson; Cornerbacks – Greg Williams; Defensive assistant – Chris Wilson; Defensive assistant – Rusty McKinney; Defensive quality control – Rob Grosso; Special teams coaches: Assistant special teams – Randall McCray; Strength and conditioning: Strength and conditioning – Buddy Morris; Assistant strength and conditioning – Vernon Stephens

== Final roster ==
2019 Arizona Cardinals roster
Quarterbacks (QB): 3 Drew Anderson; 7 Brett Hundley; 1 Kyler Murray; Running backs (RB): 41 Kenyan Drake; 29 Chase Edmonds; 31 David Johnson; Wide receivers (WR): 14 Damiere Byrd; 12 Pharoh Cooper; 11 Larry Fitzgerald; 89 Andy Isabella; 19 KeeSean Johnson; 13 Christian Kirk; 16 Trent Sherfield; Tight ends (TE): 82 Dan Arnold; 85 Charles Clay; 87 Maxx Williams	Offensive linemen (OL): 52 Mason Cole T/G; 65 Lamont Gaillard C; 73 Max Garcia G/C; 74 D. J. Humphries T; 66 Joshua Miles T; 71 Justin Murray T; 67 Justin Pugh G; 53 A. Q. Shipley C; 64 J. R. Sweezy G; Defensive linemen (DL): 72 Miles Brown NT; 91 Michael Dogbe DE; 92 Zach Kerr; 98 Corey Peters NT; 94 Caraun Reid DE	Linebackers (LB): 44 Keishawn Bierria ILB; 57 Vontarrius Dora OLB; 49 Kylie Fitts OLB; 42 Dennis Gardeck ILB; 58 Jordan Hicks ILB; 55 Chandler Jones OLB; 54 Cassius Marsh OLB; 43 Haason Reddick ILB; 47 Ezekiel Turner ILB; 59 Joe Walker ILB; Defensive backs (DB): 32 Budda Baker FS; 38 Chris Banjo FS; 22 Andre Chachere CB; 30 Jalen Davis CB; 25 Chris Payton-Jones CB; 33 Byron Murphy CB; 21 Patrick Peterson CB; 35 Deionte Thompson SS; 34 Jalen Thompson SS; 28 Charles Washington SS; Special teams (ST): 46 Aaron Brewer LS; 5 Zane Gonzalez K; 4 Andy Lee P	Practice squad: 80 Saeed Blacknall WR; 39 Justin Davis RB; 10 Johnnie Dixon WR (PS/I); 60 Javier Edwards NT; 96 Lyndon Johnson DE; 70 Sam Jones C; 56 Jamey Mosley ILB; 83 A. J. Richardson WR; 36 Sojourn Shelton CB; 20 Duke Thomas CB; Reserve: 23 Robert Alford CB (IR); 97 Zach Allen DE (IR); 90 Jonathan Bullard DE (IR); 17 Hakeem Butler WR (IR); 81 Darrell Daniels TE (IR); 37 D. J. Foster RB (IR); 76 Marcus Gilbert T (IR); 95 Rodney Gunter DE (IR); 93 Clinton McDonald DE (IR); 79 Jordan Mills T (IR); 27 Kevin Peterson CB (IR); 50 Brooks Reed OLB (IR); 27 Josh Shaw SS (Susp.); 75 William Sweet T (IR); 78 Brett Toth T (NF-Ill.); 51 Tanner Vallejo ILB (IR); 26 Brandon Williams CB (IR); Rookies in italics 53 active, 17 reserve, 9 practice squad

== Preseason ==
Week	Date	Opponent	Result	Record	Venue	Recap
1	August 8	Los Angeles Chargers	W 17–13	1–0	State Farm Stadium	Recap
2	August 15	Oakland Raiders	L 26–33	1–1	State Farm Stadium	Recap
3	August 24	at Minnesota Vikings	L 9–20	1–2	U.S. Bank Stadium	Recap
4	August 29	at Denver Broncos	L 7–20	1–3	Broncos Stadium at Mile High	Recap

== Regular season ==
=== Schedule ===
Week	Date	Opponent	Result	Record	Venue	Recap
1	September 8	Detroit Lions	**T** 27–27 (OT)	0–0–1	State Farm Stadium	Recap
2	September 15	at Baltimore Ravens	**L** 17–23	0–1–1	M&T Bank Stadium	Recap
3	September 22	Carolina Panthers	**L** 20–38	0–2–1	State Farm Stadium	Recap
4	September 29	**Seattle Seahawks**	**L** 10–27	0–3–1	State Farm Stadium	Recap
5	October 6	at Cincinnati Bengals	**W** 26–23	1–3–1	Paul Brown Stadium	Recap
6	October 13	Atlanta Falcons	**W** 34–33	2–3–1	State Farm Stadium	Recap
7	October 20	at New York Giants	**W** 27–21	3–3–1	MetLife Stadium	Recap
8	October 27	at New Orleans Saints	**L** 9–31	3–4–1	Mercedes-Benz Superdome	Recap
9	October 31	**San Francisco 49ers**	**L** 25–28	3–5–1	State Farm Stadium	Recap
10	November 10	at Tampa Bay Buccaneers	**L** 27–30	3–6–1	Raymond James Stadium	Recap
11	November 17	at **San Francisco 49ers**	**L** 26–36	3–7–1	Levi's Stadium	Recap
12	Bye					
13	December 1	**Los Angeles Rams**	**L** 7–34	3–8–1	State Farm Stadium	Recap
14	December 8	Pittsburgh Steelers	**L** 17–23	3–9–1	State Farm Stadium	Recap
15	December 15	Cleveland Browns	**W** 38–24	4–9–1	State Farm Stadium	Recap
16	December 22	at **Seattle Seahawks**	**W** 27–13	5–9–1	CenturyLink Field	Recap
17	December 29	at **Los Angeles Rams**	**L** 24–31	5–10–1	Los Angeles Memorial Coliseum	Recap

Note: Intra-division opponents are in bold text.

=== Game summaries ===
==== Week 1: vs. Detroit Lions ====
Week One: Detroit Lions at Arizona Cardinals – Game summary

Quarter	1	2	3	4	OT	Total
Lions	0	17	0	7	3	**27**
Cardinals	0	3	3	18	3	**27**

at State Farm Stadium, Glendale, Arizona

- Date: September 8
- Game time: 1:25 p.m. MST
- Game weather: None (retractable roof closed)
- Game attendance: 60,687
- Referee: Scott Novak
- TV announcers (Fox): Dick Stockton, Mark Schlereth and Jennifer Hale
- Recap, Game Book

Game information

**First quarter**

- No scoring plays.

**Second quarter**

- DET – Matt Prater 55-yard field goal, 14:07. Lions 3–0. **Drive: 10 plays, 43 yards, 5:38.**
- DET – Danny Amendola 47-yard pass from Matthew Stafford (Matt Prater kick), 12:23. Lions 10–0. **Drive: 2 plays, 51 yards, 0:47.**
- DET – Kenny Golladay 9-yard pass from Matthew Stafford (Matt Prater kick), 3:38. Lions 17–0. **Drive: 9 plays, 95 yards, 6:09.**
- ARI – Zane Gonzalez 20-yard field goal, 1:19. Lions 17–3. **Drive: 4 plays, 6 yards, 0:21.**

**Third quarter**

- ARI – Zane Gonzalez 42-yard field goal, 4:38. Lions 17–6. **Drive: 8 plays, 42 yards, 2:34.**

**Fourth quarter**

- DET – T. J. Hockenson 23-yard pass from Matthew Stafford (Matt Prater kick), 14:47. Lions 24–6. **Drive: 10 plays, 82 yards, 4:51.**
- ARI – Zane Gonzalez 34-yard field goal, 11:09. Lions 24–9. **Drive: 10 plays, 58 yards, 3:38.**
- ARI – David Johnson 27-yard pass from Kyler Murray (Zane Gonzalez kick), 5:57. Lions 24–16. **Drive: 7 plays, 70 yards, 2:55.**
- ARI – Larry Fitzgerald 4-yard pass from Kyler Murray (Kyler Murray pass to Christian Kirk), 0:43. Tied 24–24. **Drive: 9 plays, 60 yards, 1:48.**

**Overtime**

- ARI – Zane Gonzalez 28-yard field goal, 7:17. Cardinals 27–24. **Drive: 7 plays, 65 yards, 2:43.**
- DET – Matt Prater 33-yard field goal, 3:48. Tied 27–27. **Drive: 8 plays, 60 yards, 3:29.**

**Top passers**

- DET – Matthew Stafford – 27/45, 385 yards, 3 TD
- ARI – Kyler Murray – 29/54, 308 yards, 2 TD, INT

**Top rushers**

- DET – Kerryon Johnson – 16 rushes, 49 yards
- ARI – David Johnson – 18 rushes, 82 yards

**Top receivers**

- DET – T. J. Hockenson – 6 receptions, 131 yards, TD
- ARI – Larry Fitzgerald – 8 receptions, 113 yards, TD

==== Week 2: at Baltimore Ravens ====
Week Two: Arizona Cardinals at Baltimore Ravens – Game summary

Quarter	1	2	3	4	Total
Cardinals	3	3	3	8	**17**
**Ravens**	10	7	0	6	**23**

at M&T Bank Stadium, Baltimore, Maryland

- Date: September 15
- Game time: 1:00 p.m. EDT/10:00 am. MST
- Game weather: Sunny, 82 °F (28 °C)
- Game attendance: 70,126
- Referee: Ronald Torbert
- TV announcers (Fox): Brandon Gaudin, Cris Carter and Peter Schrager
- Recap, Game Book

Game information

**First quarter**

- BAL – Mark Andrews 27-yard pass from Lamar Jackson (Justin Tucker kick), 8:06. Ravens 7–0. **Drive: 7 plays, 94 yards, 3:56.**
- ARI – Zane Gonzalez 22-yard field goal, 2:18. Ravens 7–3. **Drive: 7 plays, 53 yards, 2:16.**

**Second quarter**

- BAL – Justin Tucker 33-yard field goal, 14:07. Ravens 10–3. **Drive: 9 plays, 60 yards, 3:11.**
- ARI – Zane Gonzalez 22-yard field goal, 8:31. Ravens 10–6. **Drive: 13 plays, 83 yards, 5:36.**
- BAL – Hayden Hurst 1-yard pass from Lamar Jackson (Justin Tucker kick), 3:49. Ravens 17–6. **Drive: 9 plays, 85 yards, 4:42**

**Third quarter**

- ARI – Zane Gonzalez 21-yard field goal, 9:00. Ravens 17–9. **Drive: 9 plays, 81 yards, 3:48.**

**Fourth quarter**

- BAL – Justin Tucker 28-yard field goal, 14:56. Ravens 20–9. **Drive: 16 plays, 70 yards, 9:04.**
- ARI – David Johnson 1-yard run (Kyler Murray–Keesean Johnson pass), 12:52. Ravens 20–17. **Drive: 4 plays, 79 yards, 2:04.**
- BAL – Justin Tucker 51-yard field goal, 8:56. Ravens 23–17. **Drive: 9 plays, 42 yards, 3:56.**

**Top passers**

- ARI – Kyler Murray – 25/40, 349 yards
- BAL – Lamar Jackson – 24/37, 272 yards, 2 TD

**Top rushers**

- ARI – David Johnson – 7 rushes, 14 yards, TD
- BAL – Lamar Jackson – 16 rushes, 120 yards

**Top receivers**

- ARI – Christian Kirk – 6 receptions, 114 yards
- BAL – Mark Andrews – 8 receptions, 112 yards, TD

==== Week 3: vs. Carolina Panthers ====
Week Three: Carolina Panthers at Arizona Cardinals – Game summary

Quarter	1	2	3	4	Total
**Panthers**	0	14	14	10	**38**
Cardinals	7	3	10	0	**20**

at State Farm Stadium, Glendale, Arizona

- Date: September 22
- Game time: 1:05 pm. MST
- Game weather: None (retractable roof closed)
- Game attendance: 60,104
- Referee: Craig Wrolstad
- TV announcers (Fox): Dan Hellie, Brady Quinn and Sarah Kustok
- Recap, Game Book

Game information

**First quarter**

- ARI – Larry Fitzgerald 1-yard pass from Kyler Murray (Zane Gonzalez kick), 4:30. Cardinals 7–0. **Drive: 14 plays, 74 yards, 6:17.**

**Second quarter**

- CAR – Curtis Samuel 5-yard pass from Kyle Allen (Joey Slye kick), 14:09. Tied 7–7. **Drive: 11 plays, 75 yards, 5:21.**
- ARI – Zane Gonzalez 34-yard field goal, 1:36. Cardinals 10–7. **Drive: 15 plays, 53 yards, 5:58.**
- CAR – D. J. Moore 52-yard pass from Kyle Allen (Joey Slye kick), 0:49. Panthers 14–10. **Drive: 3 plays, 75 yards, 0:47.**

**Third quarter**

- ARI – David Johnson 3-yard pass from Kyler Murray (Zane Gonzalez kick), 11:20. Cardinals 17–14. **Drive: 9 plays, 75 yards, 3:40.**
- CAR – Greg Olsen 3-yard pass from Kyle Allen (Joey Slye kick), 7:44. Panthers 21–17. **Drive: 7 plays, 75 yards, 3:36.**
- ARI – Zane Gonzalez 47-yard field goal, 2:47. Panthers 21–20. **Drive: 12 plays, 49 yards, 4:57.**
- CAR – Christian McCaffrey 76-yard run (Joey Slye kick), 1:53. Panthers 28–20. **Drive: 2 plays, 84 yards, 0:54.**

**Fourth quarter**

- CAR – Greg Olsen 3-yard pass from Kyle Allen (Joey Slye kick), 13:32. Panthers 35–20. **Drive: 6 plays, 22 yards, 2:42.**
- CAR – Joey Slye 36-yard field goal, 4:27. Panthers 38–20. **Drive: 4 plays, 4 yards, 0:18.**

**Top passers**

- CAR – Kyle Allen – 19/26, 261 yards, 4 TD
- ARI – Kyler Murray – 30/43, 173 yards, 2 TD, 2 INT

**Top rushers**

- CAR – Christian McCaffrey – 24 rushes, 153 yards, TD
- ARI – Kyler Murray – 8 rushes, 69 yards

**Top receivers**

- CAR – Greg Olsen – 6 receptions, 75 yards, 2 TD
- ARI – Christian Kirk – 10 receptions, 59 yards

==== Week 4: vs. Seattle Seahawks ====
Week Four: Seattle Seahawks at Arizona Cardinals – Game summary

Quarter	1	2	3	4	Total
**Seahawks**	10	10	0	7	**27**
Cardinals	0	3	0	7	**10**

at State Farm Stadium, Glendale, Arizona

- Date: September 29
- Game time: 1:05 pm. MST
- Game weather: None (retractable roof closed)
- Game attendance: 60,500
- Referee: Shawn Smith
- TV announcers (Fox): Dick Stockton, Mark Schlereth and Jennifer Hale
- Recap, Game Book

Game information

**First quarter**

- SEA – Jason Myers 33-yard field goal, 4:59. Seahawks 3–0. **Drive: 11 plays, 52 yards, 4:44.**
- SEA – Jadeveon Clowney 27-yard interception return (Jason Myers kick), 4:15. Seahawks 10–0.

**Second quarter**

- ARI – Zane Gonzalez 33-yard field goal, 13:49. Seahawks 10–3. **Drive: 12 plays, 60 yards, 5:26.**
- SEA – Will Dissly 9-yard pass from Russell Wilson (Jason Myers kick), 10:48. Seahawks 17–3. **Drive: 6 plays, 75 yards, 3:01.**
- SEA – Jason Myers 24-yard field goal, 0:17. Seahawks 20–3. **Drive: 10 plays, 50 yards, 3:53.**

**Third quarter**

- No scoring plays.

**Fourth quarter**

- ARI – Kyler Murray 9-yard run (Zane Gonzalez kick), 10:21. Seahawks 20–10. **Drive: 8 plays, 80 yards, 3:11.**
- SEA – C. J. Prosise 9-yard run (Jason Myers kick), 2:13. Seahawks 27–10. **Drive: 15 plays, 75 yards, 8:08.**

**Top passers**

- SEA – Russell Wilson – 22/28, 240 yards, TD
- ARI – Kyler Murray – 22/32, 241 yards, INT

**Top rushers**

- SEA – Chris Carson – 22 rushes, 104 yards
- ARI – David Johnson – 11 rushes, 40 yards

**Top receivers**

- SEA – Will Dissly – 7 receptions, 57 yards, TD
- ARI – David Johnson – 8 receptions, 99 yards

==== Week 5: at Cincinnati Bengals ====
Week Five: Arizona Cardinals at Cincinnati Bengals – Game summary

Quarter	1	2	3	4	Total
**Cardinals**	7	6	0	13	**26**
Bengals	3	3	3	14	**23**

at Paul Brown Stadium, Cincinnati, Ohio

- Date: October 6
- Game time: 1:00 pm. EDT/10:00 am. MST
- Game weather: Cloudy, 76 °F (24 °C)
- Game attendance: 46,012
- Referee: John Hussey
- TV announcers (Fox): Thom Brennaman, Chris Spielman and Shannon Spake
- Recap, Game Book

Game information

**First quarter**

- CIN – Randy Bullock 23-yard field goal, 8:28. Bengals 3–0. **Drive: 12 plays, 65 yards, 5:39.**
- ARI – Kyler Murray 6-yard run (Zane Gonzalez kick), 3:40. Cardinals 7–3. **Drive: 9 plays, 68 yards, 4:48.**

**Second quarter**

- ARI – Zane Gonzalez 23-yard field goal, 5:09. Cardinals 10–3. **Drive: 12 plays, 75 yards, 5:01.**
- CIN – Randy Bullock 48-yard field goal, 3:27. Cardinals 10–6. **Drive: 5 plays, 20 yards, 1:42.**
- ARI – Zane Gonzalez 20-yard field goal, 0:00. Cardinals 13–6. **Drive: 12 plays, 73 yards, 3:27.**

**Third quarter**

- CIN – Randy Bullock 23-yard field goal, 8:34. Cardinals 13–9. **Drive: 15 plays, 70 yards, 6:26.**

**Fourth quarter**

- ARI – Zane Gonzalez 22-yard field goal, 13:25. Cardinals 16–9. **Drive: 7 plays, 38 yards, 3:12.**
- ARI – Chase Edmonds 37-yard run (Zane Gonzalez kick), 7:13. Cardinals 23–9. **Drive: 7 plays, 78 yards, 3:08.**
- CIN – Auden Tate 2-yard pass from Andy Dalton (Randy Bullock kick), 4:08. Cardinals 23–16. **Drive: 10 plays, 79 yards, 3:05.**
- CIN – Tyler Boyd 42-yard pass from Andy Dalton (Randy Bullock kick), 2:00. Tied 23–23. **Drive: 4 plays, 81 yards, 1:41.**
- ARI – Zane Gonzalez 31-yard field goal, 0:00. Cardinals 26–23. **Drive: 6 plays, 62 yards, 2:00.**

**Top passers**

- ARI – Kyler Murray – 20/32, 253 yards
- CIN – Andy Dalton – 27/38, 262 yards, 2 TD

**Top rushers**

- ARI – Kyler Murray – 10 rushes, 93 yards, TD
- CIN – Joe Mixon – 19 rushes, 93 yards

**Top receivers**

- ARI – David Johnson – 3 receptions, 65 yards
- CIN – Tyler Boyd – 10 receptions, 123 yards, TD

==== Week 6: vs. Atlanta Falcons ====
Week Six: Atlanta Falcons at Arizona Cardinals – Game summary

Quarter	1	2	3	4	Total
Falcons	7	3	10	13	**33**
**Cardinals**	3	17	7	7	**34**

at State Farm Stadium, Glendale, Arizona

- Date: October 13
- Game time: 1:05 pm. MST
- Game weather: None (retractable roof closed)
- Game attendance: 60,140
- Referee: Carl Cheffers
- TV announcers (Fox): Thom Brennaman, Chris Spielman and Megan Olivi
- Recap, Game Book

Game information

**First quarter**

- ATL – Calvin Ridley 9-yard pass from Matt Ryan (Matt Bryant kick), 9:23. Falcons 7–0. **Drive: 10 plays, 80 yards, 5:37.**
- ARI – Zane Gonzalez 39-yard field goal, 5:41. Falcons 7–3. **Drive: 9 plays, 57 yards, 3:42.**

**Second quarter**

- ARI – Chase Edmonds 2-yard pass from Kyler Murray (Zane Gonzalez kick), 13:02. Cardinals 10–7. **Drive: 9 plays, 86 yards, 4:52.**
- ARI – David Johnson 1-yard run (Zane Gonzalez kick), 9:02. Cardinals 17–7. **Drive: 4 plays, 79 yards, 1:52.**
- ATL – Matt Bryant 29-yard field goal, 3:37. Cardinals 17–10. **Drive: 11 plays, 64 yards, 5:25.**
- ARI – Zane Gonzalez 22-yard field goal, 0:04. Cardinals 20–10. **Drive: 15 plays, 71 yards, 3:33.**

**Third quarter**

- ARI – Maxx Williams 20-yard pass from Kyler Murray (Zane Gonzalez kick), 11:25. Cardinals 27–10. **Drive: 9 plays, 64 yards, 3:35.**
- ATL – Matt Bryant 44-yard field goal, 7:46. Cardinals 27–13. **Drive: 8 plays, 49 yards, 3:39.**
- ATL – Devonta Freeman 7-yard pass from Matt Ryan (Matt Bryant kick), 1:02. Cardinals 27–20. **Drive: 10 plays, 93 yards, 4:34.**

**Fourth quarter**

- ATL – Austin Hooper 6-yard pass from Matt Ryan (Matt Bryant kick), 10:50. Tied 27–27. **Drive: 8 plays, 83 yards, 3:12.**
- ARI – David Johnson 14-yard pass from Kyler Murray (Zane Gonzalez kick), 5:12. Cardinals 34–27. **Drive: 5 plays, 45 yards, 2:00.**
- ATL – Devonta Freeman 12-yard pass from Matt Ryan (kick failed, wide left), 1:53. Cardinals 34–33. **Drive: 7 plays, 75 yards, 3:19.**

**Top passers**

- ATL – Matt Ryan – 30/36, 356 yards, 4 TD
- ARI – Kyler Murray – 27/37, 340 yards, 3 TD

**Top rushers**

- ATL – Devonta Freeman – 19 rushes, 88 yards
- ARI – David Johnson – 12 rushes, 34 yards, TD

**Top receivers**

- ATL – Austin Hooper – 8 receptions, 117 yards, TD
- ARI – Larry Fitzgerald – 6 receptions, 69 yards

==== Week 7: at New York Giants ====
Week Seven: Arizona Cardinals at New York Giants – Game summary

Quarter	1	2	3	4	Total
**Cardinals**	14	3	7	3	**27**
Giants	0	14	0	7	**21**

at MetLife Stadium, East Rutherford, New Jersey

- Date: October 20
- Game time: 1:00 pm. EDT/10:00 am. MST
- Game weather: Light rain, 56 °F (13 °C)
- Game attendance: 73,577
- Referee: Adrian Hill
- TV announcers (Fox): Kenny Albert, Greg Olsen and Lindsay Czarniak
- Recap, Game Book

Game information

**First quarter**

- ARI – Chase Edmonds 20-yard run (Zane Gonzalez kick), 8:14. Cardinals 7–0. **Drive: 13 plays, 75 yards, 6:46.**
- ARI – Chase Edmonds 20-yard run (Zane Gonzalez kick), 4:15. Cardinals 14–0. **Drive: 3 plays, 32 yards, 1:23.**

**Second quarter**

- ARI – Zane Gonzalez 47-yard field goal, 13:30. Cardinals 17–0. **Drive: 9 plays, 54 yards, 4:29.**
- NYG – Rhett Ellison 28-yard pass from Daniel Jones (Aldrick Rosas kick), 11:28. Cardinals 17–7. **Drive: 4 plays, 79 yards, 2:02.**
- NYG – Elijhaa Penny blocked punt recovery in end zone (Aldrick Rosas kick), 9:52. Cardinals 17–14.

**Third quarter**

- ARI – Chase Edmonds 22-yard run (Zane Gonzalez kick), 6:05. Cardinals 24–14. **Drive: 3 plays, 51 yards, 1:21.**

**Fourth quarter**

- NYG – Saquon Barkley 7-yard run (Aldrick Rosas kick), 8:13. Cardinals 24–21. **Drive: 8 plays, 82 yards, 4:44.**
- ARI – Zane Gonzalez 35-yard field goal, 2:09. Cardinals 27–21. **Drive: 4 plays, 0 yards, 0:19.**

**Top passers**

- ARI – Kyler Murray – 14/21, 104 yards
- NYG – Daniel Jones – 22/35, 223 yards, TD, INT

**Top rushers**

- ARI – Chase Edmonds – 27 rushes, 126 yards, 3 TD
- NYG – Saquon Barkley – 18 rushes, 72 yards, TD

**Top receivers**

- ARI – Pharoh Cooper – 4 receptions, 29 yards
- NYG – Golden Tate – 6 receptions, 80 yards

==== Week 8: at New Orleans Saints ====
Week Eight: Arizona Cardinals at New Orleans Saints – Game summary

Quarter	1	2	3	4	Total
Cardinals	3	3	3	0	**9**
**Saints**	0	10	7	14	**31**

at Mercedes-Benz Superdome, New Orleans, Louisiana

- Date: October 27
- Game time: 12:00 p.m. CST/10:00 am. MST
- Game weather: None (indoor stadium)
- Game attendance: 73,064
- Referee: Clay Martin
- TV announcers (CBS): Kevin Harlan, Rich Gannon and Jay Feely
- Recap, Game Book

Game information

**First quarter**

- ARI – Zane Gonzalez 31-yard field goal, 5:41. Cardinals 3–0. **Drive: 6 plays, 50 yards, 3:13.**

**Second quarter**

- NO – Wil Lutz 26-yard field goal, 14:13. Tied 3–3. **Drive: 11 plays, 68 yards, 6:28.**
- NO – Latavius Murray 8-yard run (Wil Lutz kick), 8:59. Saints 10–3. **Drive: 7 plays, 71 yards, 3:59.**
- ARI – Zane Gonzalez 31-yard field goal, 5:18. Saints 10–6. **Drive: 9 plays, 51 yards, 3:41.**

**Third quarter**

- NO – Latavius Murray 15-yard pass from Drew Brees (Wil Lutz kick), 5:25. Saints 17–6. **Drive: 5 plays, 30 yards, 2:07.**
- ARI – Zane Gonzalez 50-yard field goal, 1:42. Saints 17–9. **Drive: 9 plays, 43 yards, 3:43.**

**Fourth quarter**

- NO – Taysom Hill 5-yard pass from Drew Brees (Wil Lutz kick), 12:48. Saints 24–9. **Drive: 7 plays, 75 yards, 3:54.**
- NO – Michael Thomas 9-yard pass from Drew Brees (Wil Lutz kick), 5:18. Saints 31–9. **Drive: 3 plays, 73 yards, 1:25.**

**Top passers**

- ARI – Kyler Murray – 19/33, 220 yards
- NO – Drew Brees – 34/43, 373 yards, 3 TD, INT

**Top rushers**

- ARI – Christian Kirk – 1 rush, 19 yards
- NO – Latavius Murray – 21 rushes, 102 yards, TD

**Top receivers**

- ARI – Charles Clay – 3 receptions, 88 yards
- NO – Michael Thomas – 11 receptions, 112 yards, TD

==== Week 9: vs. San Francisco 49ers ====
Week Nine: San Francisco 49ers at Arizona Cardinals – Game summary

Quarter	1	2	3	4	Total
**49ers**	7	14	7	0	**28**
Cardinals	7	0	7	11	**25**

at State Farm Stadium, Glendale, Arizona

- Date: October 31
- Game time: 5:20 pm. MST
- Game weather: Sunny, 75 °F (24 °C) (retractable roof open)
- Game attendance: 60,986
- Referee: Brad Rogers
- TV announcers (Fox/NFLN/Amazon Prime): Joe Buck, Troy Aikman, Erin Andrews and Kristina Pink
- Recap, Game Book

Game information

**First quarter**

- ARI – Kenyan Drake 4-yard run (Zane Gonzalez kick), 12:11. Cardinals 7–0. **Drive: 6 plays, 71 yards, 2:49.**
- SF – George Kittle 30-yard pass from Jimmy Garoppolo (Robbie Gould kick), 0:04. Tied 7–7. **Drive: 8 plays, 59 yards, 4:26.**

**Second quarter**

- SF – Kendrick Bourne 7-yard pass from Jimmy Garoppolo (Robbie Gould kick), 8:58. 49ers 14–7. **Drive: 7 plays, 76 yards, 3:30.**
- SF – Emmanuel Sanders 1-yard pass from Jimmy Garoppolo (Robbie Gould kick), 0:00. 49ers 21–7. **Drive: 13 plays, 80 yards, 4:58.**

**Third quarter**

- ARI – KeeSean Johnson 9-yard pass from Kyler Murray (Zane Gonzalez kick), 9:01. 49ers 21–14. **Drive: 7 plays, 83 yards, 2:41.**
- SF – Dante Pettis 21-yard pass from Jimmy Garoppolo (Robbie Gould kick), 5:55. 49ers 28–14. **Drive: 7 plays, 75 yards, 3:06.**

**Fourth quarter**

- ARI – Zane Gonzalez 36-yard field goal, 9:24. 49ers 28–17. **Drive: 13 plays, 75 yards, 6:37.**
- ARI – Andy Isabella 88-yard pass from Kyler Murray (Kyler Murray–Kenyan Drake pass), 4:53. 49ers 28–25. **Drive: 2 plays, 90 yards, 0:35.**

**Top passers**

- SF – Jimmy Garoppolo – 28/37, 317 yards, 4 TD
- ARI – Kyler Murray – 17/24, 241 yards, 2 TD

**Top rushers**

- SF – Matt Breida – 15 rushes, 78 yards
- ARI – Kenyan Drake – 15 rushes, 110 yards, TD

**Top receivers**

- SF – Emmanuel Sanders – 7 receptions, 112 yards, TD
- ARI – Andy Isabella – 1 reception, 88 yards, TD

==== Week 10: at Tampa Bay Buccaneers ====
Week Ten: Arizona Cardinals at Tampa Bay Buccaneers – Game summary

Quarter	1	2	3	4	Total
Cardinals	3	10	7	7	**27**
**Buccaneers**	7	10	3	10	**30**

at Raymond James Stadium, Tampa, Florida

- Date: November 10
- Game time: 1:00 pm. EST/11:00 a.m. MST
- Game weather: Sunny, 77 °F (25 °C)
- Game attendance: 40,038
- Referee: Craig Wrolstad
- TV announcers (Fox): Thom Brennaman, Chris Spielman and Shannon Spake
- Recap, Game Book

Game information

**First quarter**

- ARI – Zane Gonzalez 37-yard field goal, 11:13. Cardinals 3–0. **Drive: 7 plays, 18 yards, 2:28.**
- TB – Ronald Jones 7-yard run (Matt Gay kick), 3:42. Buccaneers 7–3. **Drive: 11 plays, 60 yards, 7:31.**
- ARI – Zane Gonzalez 54-yard field goal, 14:14. Buccaneers 7–6. **Drive: 11 plays, 39 yards, 4:28.**

**Second quarter**

- TB – Matt Gay 30-yard field goal, 8:53. Buccaneers 10–6. **Drive: 12 plays, 63 yards, 5:21.**
- ARI – Christian Kirk 33-yard pass from Kyler Murray (Zane Gonzalez kick), 1:03. Cardinals 13–10. **Drive: 9 plays, 96 yards, 3:11.**
- TB – O. J. Howard 10-yard pass from Jameis Winston (Matt Gay kick), 0:08. Buccaneers 17–13. **Drive: 7 plays, 75 yards, 0:55.**

**Third quarter**

- TB – Matt Gay 45-yard field goal, 8:37. Buccaneers 20–13. **Drive: 9 plays, 49 yards, 4:31.**
- ARI – Christian Kirk 69-yard pass from Kyler Murray (Zane Gonzalez kick), 8:10. Tied 20–20. **Drive: 2 plays, 75 yards, 0:27.**
- TB – Matt Gay 41-yard field goal, 9:44. Buccaneers 23–20. **Drive: 12 plays, 66 yards, 6:30.**

**Fourth quarter**

- ARI – Christian Kirk 15-yard pass from Kyler Murray (Zane Gonzalez kick), 7:22. Cardinals 27–23. **Drive: 8 plays, 75 yards, 2:22.**
- TB – Peyton Barber 1-yard run (Matt Gay kick), 1:43. Buccaneers 30–27. **Drive: 6 plays, 92 yards, 1:57.**

**Top passers**

- ARI – Kyler Murray – 27/44, 324 yards, 3 TD, INT
- TB – Jameis Winston – 30/48, 358 yards, TD, 2 INT

**Top rushers**

- ARI – Kyler Murray – 3 rushes, 38 yards
- TB – Peyton Barber – 11 rushes, 43 yards, TD

**Top receivers**

- ARI – Christian Kirk – 6 receptions, 138 yards, 3 TD
- TB – Mike Evans – 4 receptions, 82 yards

==== Week 11: at San Francisco 49ers ====
Week Eleven: Arizona Cardinals at San Francisco 49ers – Game summary

Quarter	1	2	3	4	Total
Cardinals	9	7	3	7	**26**
**49ers**	0	10	7	19	**36**

at Levi's Stadium, Santa Clara, California

- Date: November 17
- Game time: 2:05 pm. MST/1:05 p.m. PST
- Game weather: Sunny, 72 °F (22 °C)
- Game attendance: 69,419
- Referee: Walt Anderson
- TV announcers (Fox): Chris Myers, Daryl Johnston and Laura Okmin
- Recap, Game Book

Game information

**First quarter**

- ARI – Zane Gonzalez 26-yard field goal, 10:31. Cardinals 3–0 **Drive: 10 plays, 67 yards, 4:29.**
- ARI – Larry Fitzgerald 5-yard pass from Kyler Murray (kick failed, wide left), 4:04. Cardinals 9–0. **Drive: 11 plays, 81 yards, 5:08.**

**Second quarter**

- ARI – Pharoh Cooper 5-yard pass from Kyler Murray (Zane Gonzalez kick), 9:03. Cardinals 16–0. **Drive: 9 plays, 57 yards, 5:03.**
- SF – Ross Dwelley 4-yard pass from Jimmy Garoppolo (Chase McLaughlin kick), 7:52. Cardinals 16–7. **Drive: 5 plays, 75 yards, 1:11.**
- SF – Chase McLaughlin 43-yard field goal, 0:00. Cardinals 16–10 **Drive: 11 plays, 55 yards, 4:46.**

**Third quarter**

- SF – Ross Dwelley 5-yard pass from Jimmy Garoppolo (Chase McLaughlin kick), 11:07. 49ers 17–16. **Drive: 6 plays, 84 yards, 3:53.**
- ARI – Zane Gonzalez 43-yard field goal, 2:54. Cardinals 19–17 **Drive: 7 plays, 22 yards, 2:25.**

**Fourth quarter**

- SF – Kendrick Bourne 2-yard pass from Jimmy Garoppolo (pass failed), 12:14. 49ers 23–19. **Drive: 10 plays, 75 yards, 5:40.**
- ARI – Kyler Murray 22-yard run (Zane Gonzalez kick), 6:30. Cardinals 26–23. **Drive: 10 plays, 78 yards, 5:44.**
- SF – Jeff Wilson 25-yard pass from Jimmy Garoppolo (Chase McLaughlin kick), 0:31. 49ers 30–26. **Drive: 8 plays, 65 yards, 1:41.**
- SF – D. J. Reed 4-yard fumble return, 0:00. 49ers 36–26.

**Top passers**

- ARI – Kyler Murray – 23/31, 146 yards, 2 TD
- SF – Jimmy Garoppolo – 34/45, 424 yards, 4 TD, 2 INT

**Top rushers**

- ARI – Kyler Murray – 8 rushes, 67 yards, TD
- SF – Tevin Coleman – 12 rushes, 14 yards

**Top receivers**

- ARI – Christian Kirk – 6 receptions, 41 yards
- SF – Deebo Samuel – 8 reception, 134 yards

The Cardinals were swept by the 49ers for the first time since 2013.

==== Week 13: vs. Los Angeles Rams ====
Week Thirteen: Los Angeles Rams at Arizona Cardinals – Game summary

Quarter	1	2	3	4	Total
**Rams**	3	17	14	0	**34**
Cardinals	0	0	0	7	**7**

at State Farm Stadium, Glendale, Arizona

- Date: December 1
- Game time: 2:05 pm. MST
- Game weather: Partly cloudy, 64 °F (18 °C) (retractable roof open)
- Game attendance: 60,944
- Referee: Alex Kemp
- TV announcers (Fox): Chris Myers, Daryl Johnston and Laura Okmin
- Recap, Game Book

Game information

**First quarter**

- LAR - Greg Zuerlein 27-yard field goal, 9:56. Rams 3-0. **Drive: 10 plays, 66 yards, 5:04.**

**Second quarter**

- LAR - Tyler Higbee 2-yard pass from Jared Goff (Greg Zuerlein kick), 14:17. Rams 10-0. **Drive: 10 plays, 81 yards, 4:02.**
- LAR - Todd Gurley 1-yard run (Greg Zuerlein kick), 2:41. Rams 17-0. **Drive: 7 plays, 82 yards, 3:14.**
- LAR - Greg Zuerlein 33-yard field goal, 0:00. Rams 20-0. **Drive: 11 plays, 63 yards, 1:53.**

**Third quarter**

- LAR - Cooper Kupp 10-yard pass from Jared Goff (Greg Zuerlein kick), 8:44. Rams 27-0. **Drive: 9 plays, 92 yards, 3:17.**
- LAR - Taylor Rapp 31-yard interception return (Greg Zuerlein kick), 8:28. Rams 34-0.

**Fourth quarter**

- ARI - Kyler Murray 15-yard run (Zane Gonzalez kick), 8:35. Rams 34-7. **Drive: 13 plays, 80 yards, 5:15.**

**Top passers**

- ARI - Kyler Murray - 19/34, 163 yards, INT
- LAR - Jared Goff - 32/43, 424 yards, 2 TD

**Top rushers**

- ARI - Kenyan Drake - 13 rushes, 31 yards
- LAR - Todd Gurley - 19 rushes, 95 yards, TD

**Top receivers**

- ARI - Larry Fitzgerald - 6 receptions, 56 yards
- LAR - Robert Woods - 13 receptions, 172 yards

==== Week 14: vs. Pittsburgh Steelers ====
Week Fourteen: Pittsburgh Steelers at Arizona Cardinals – Game summary

Quarter	1	2	3	4	Total
**Steelers**	10	3	7	3	**23**
Cardinals	0	10	0	7	**17**

at State Farm Stadium, Glendale, Arizona

- Date: December 8
- Game time: 2:25 pm. MST
- Game weather: None (retractable roof closed)
- Game attendance: 63,880
- Referee: Ronald Torbert
- TV announcers (CBS): Andrew Catalon, James Lofton and Amanda Balionis
- Recap, Game Book

Game information

**First quarter**

- PIT – Chris Boswell 30-yard field goal, 4:20. Steelers 3–0. **Drive: 13 plays, 66 yards, 8:00.**
- PIT– Diontae Johnson 85-yard punt return. (Chris Boswell kick), 2:52. Steelers 10–0.

**Second quarter**

- ARI – Zane Gonzalez 30-yard field goal, 11:15. Steelers 10–3. **Drive: 9 plays, 22 yards, 4:23.**
- ARI – Charles Clay 5-yard pass from Kyler Murray. (Zane Gonzalez kick), 1:51. Tied 10–10. **Drive: 12 plays, 85 yards, 5:12.**
- PIT – Chris Boswell 37-yard field goal, 0:00. Steelers 13–10. **Drive: 8 plays, 56 yards, 1:51.**

**Third quarter**

- PIT – Diontae Johnson 2-yard pass from Devlin Hodges (Chris Boswell kick), 2:00. Steelers 20–10. **Drive: 10 plays, 73 yards, 6:06.**

**Fourth quarter**

- ARI – David Johnson 24-yard pass from Kyler Murray. (Zane Gonzalez kick), 6:44. Steelers 20–17. **Drive: 3 plays, 32 yards, 1:20.**
- PIT – Chris Boswell 25-yard field goal, 1:42. Steelers 23–17. **Drive: 11 plays, 77 yards, 5:02.**

**Top passers**

- PIT – Devlin Hodges – 16/19, 152 yards, TD
- ARI – Kyler Murray – 20/30, 194 yards, 2 TD, 3 INT

**Top rushers**

- PIT – Benny Snell – 16 rushes, 41 yards
- ARI – Kenyan Drake – 11 rushes, 37 yards

**Top receivers**

- PIT – Diontae Johnson – 6 receptions, 60 yards, TD
- ARI – Christian Kirk – 9 receptions, 85 yards

==== Week 15: vs. Cleveland Browns ====
Week Fifteen: Cleveland Browns at Arizona Cardinals – Game summary

Quarter	1	2	3	4	Total
Browns	0	10	7	7	**24**
**Cardinals**	7	14	7	10	**38**

at State Farm Stadium, Glendale, Arizona

- Date: December 15
- Game time: 2:05 pm. MST
- Game weather: Sunny, 66 °F (19 °C) (retractable roof open)
- Game attendance: 63,345
- Referee: Brad Allen
- TV announcers (CBS): Tom McCarthy and Jay Feely
- Recap, Game Book

Game information

**First quarter**

- ARI - Kenyan Drake 5-yard run (Zane Gonzalez kick), 10:09. Cardinals 7-0. **Drive: 10 plays, 90 yards, 4:51.**

**Second quarter**

- ARI - Kenyan Drake 1-yard run (Zane Gonzalez kick), 12:02. Cardinals 14-0. **Drive: 6 plays, 67 yards, 3:18.**
- CLE - Nick Chubb 33-yard run (Austin Seibert kick), 7:50. Cardinals 14-7. **Drive: 7 plays, 83 yards, 4:12.**
- CLE - Austin Seibert 44-yard field goal, 4:33. Cardinals 14-10. **Drive: 4 plays, 2 yards, 2:12.**
- ARI - Dan Arnold 6-yard pass from Kyler Murray (Zane Gonzalez kick), 0:25. Cardinals 21-10. **Drive: 11 plays, 87 yards, 4:08.**

**Third quarter**

- CLE - Ricky Seals-Jones 2-yard pass from Baker Mayfield (Austin Seibert kick), 8:54. Cardinals 21-17. **Drive: 11 plays, 75 yards, 6:06.**
- ARI - Kenyan Drake 1-yard run (Zane Gonzalez kick), 1:40. Cardinals 28-17. **Drive: 6 plays, 61 yards, 3:06.**

**Fourth quarter**

- ARI - Kenyan Drake 17-yard run (Zane Gonzalez kick), 7:25. Cardinals 35-17. **Drive: 8 plays, 65 yards, 4:40.**
- ARI - Zane Gonzalez 21-yard field goal, 5:18., Cardinals 38-17. **Drive: 6 plays, 27 yards, 1:55.**
- CLE - Ricky Seals-Jones 1-yard pass from Baker Mayfield (Austin Seibert kick), 1:21. Cardinals 38-24. **Drive: 19 plays, 91 yards, 3:57.**

**Top passers**

- ARI - Kyler Murray - 19/25, 219 yards, TD, INT
- CLE - Baker Mayfield - 30/43, 247 yards, 2 TD, INT

**Top rushers**

- ARI - Kenyan Drake - 22 rushes, 137 yards, 4 TD
- CLE - Nick Chubb - 17 rushes, 127 yards, TD

**Top receivers**

- ARI - Damiere Byrd - 6 receptions, 86 yards
- CLE - Odell Beckham Jr. - 8 receptions, 66 yards

==== Week 16: at Seattle Seahawks ====
Week Sixteen: Arizona Cardinals at Seattle Seahawks – Game summary

Quarter	1	2	3	4	Total
**Cardinals**	7	10	3	7	**27**
Seahawks	7	0	0	6	**13**

at CenturyLink Field, Seattle, Washington

- Date: December 22
- Game time: 2:25 pm. MST/1:25 pm. PST
- Game weather: Cloudy, 43 °F (6 °C)
- Game attendance: 69,022
- Referee: Brad Rogers
- TV announcers (Fox): Chris Myers, Daryl Johnston and Laura Okmin
- Recap, Game Book

Game information

**First quarter**

- SEA – Nick Bellore 3-yard pass from Russell Wilson (Jason Myers kick), 8:50. Seahawks 7–0. **Drive: 9 plays, 89 yards, 4:37.**
- ARI – Kenyan Drake 80-yard run (Zane Gonzalez kick), 8:33. Tied 7–7. **Drive: 1 play, 80 yards, 0:17.**

**Second quarter**

- ARI – Larry Fitzgerald 21-yard pass from Kyler Murray (Zane Gonzalez kick), 4:16. Cardinals 14–7. **Drive: 5 plays, 54 yards, 2:41.**
- ARI – Zane Gonzalez 22-yard field goal, 0:22. Cardinals 17–7. **Drive: 11 plays, 51 yards, 2:04.**

**Third quarter**

- ARI – Zane Gonzalez 46-yard field goal, 11:36. Cardinals 20–7. **Drive: 6 plays, 37 yards, 2:25.**

**Fourth quarter**

- SEA – Jason Myers 30-yard field goal, 14:56. Cardinals 20–10. **Drive: 4 plays, 4 yards, 1:12.**
- SEA – Jason Myers 51-yard field goal, 10:02. Cardinals 20–13. **Drive: 8 plays, 42 yards, 2:02.**
- ARI – Kenyan Drake 3-yard run (Zane Gonzalez kick), 4:18. Cardinals 27–13. **Drive: 9 plays, 78 yards, 5:44.**

**Top passers**

- ARI – Kyler Murray – 11/18, 118 yards, TD
- SEA – Russell Wilson – 16/31, 169 yards, TD

**Top rushers**

- ARI – Kenyan Drake – 24 rushes, 166 yards, 2 TD
- SEA – Chris Carson – 8 rushes, 40 yards

**Top receivers**

- ARI – Larry Fitzgerald – 4 receptions, 48 yards
- SEA – Travis Homer – 6 receptions, 26 yards

==== Week 17: at Los Angeles Rams ====
Week Seventeen: Arizona Cardinals at Los Angeles Rams – Game summary

Quarter	1	2	3	4	Total
Cardinals	7	3	7	7	**24**
**Rams**	3	14	0	14	**31**

at Los Angeles Memorial Coliseum, Los Angeles, California

- Date: December 29
- Game time: 2:25 pm. MST/1:25 pm. PST
- Game weather: Cloudy, 62 °F (17 °C)
- Game attendance: 68,665
- Referee: Jerome Boger
- TV announcers (Fox): Chris Myers, Daryl Johnston and Laura Okmin
- Recap, Game Book

Game information

**First quarter**

- LAR - Greg Zuerlein 47-yard field goal, 9:12. Rams 3-0. **Drive: 12 plays, 46 yards, 5:48.**
- ARI - Dan Arnold 23-yard pass from Kyler Murray (Zane Gonzalez kick), 3:54. Cardinals 7-3. **Drive: 2 plays, 22 yards, 0:44.**

**Second quarter**

- LAR - Malcolm Brown 3-yard run (Greg Zuerlein kick), 10:54. Rams 10-7. **Drive:11 plays, 47 yards, 4:34.**
- LAR - Cooper Kupp 6-yard pass from Jared Goff (Greg Zuerlein kick), 3:49. Rams 17-7. **Drive: 3 plays, 8 yards, 1:39.**
- ARI - Zane Gonzalez 31-yard field goal, 0:04. Rams 17-10. **Drive: 9 plays, 55 yards, 0:56.**

**Third quarter**

- ARI - Damiere Byrd 3-yard pass from Kyler Murray (Zane Gonzalez kick), 4:43. Tied 17-17. **Drive: 10 plays, 67 yards, 4:45.**

**Fourth quarter**

- LAR - Tyler Higbee 4-yard pass from Jared Goff (Greg Zuerlein kick), 13:34. Rams 24-17. **Drive: 12 plays, 70 yards, 6:09.**
- LAR - Robert Woods 11-yard pass from Jared Goff (Greg Zuerlein kick), 7:52. Rams 31-17. **Drive: 8 plays, 81 yards, 3:34.**
- ARI - Kenyan Drake 1-yard run (Zane Gonzalez kick), 3:59. Rams 31-24. 'Drive: 9 plays, 60 yards, 3:59

**Top passers**

- ARI - Kyler Murray - 26/42, 325 yards, 2 TD, 2 INT
- LAR - Jared Goff - 29/45, 319 yards, 3 TD

**Top rushers**

- ARI - Kenyan Drake - 12 rushes, 60 yards, TD
- LAR - Todd Gurley - 20 rushes, 68 yards

**Top receivers**

- ARI - Dan Arnold - 4 receptions, 76 yards, TD
- LAR - Cooper Kupp - 7 receptions, 99 yards, TD

=== Standings ===
==== Division ====
NFC West
	W	L	T	PCT	DIV	CONF	PF	PA	STK
^{(1)} San Francisco 49ers	13	3	0	.813	5–1	10–2	479	310	W2
^{(5)} Seattle Seahawks	11	5	0	.688	3–3	8–4	405	398	L2
Los Angeles Rams	9	7	0	.563	3–3	7–5	394	364	W1
Arizona Cardinals	5	10	1	.344	1–5	3–8–1	361	442	L1

==== Conference ====
NFC
#	Team	Division	W	L	T	PCT	DIV	CONF	SOS	SOV	STK
**Division leaders**
1 (Note: San Francisco finished ahead of Green Bay and New Orleans based on head-to-head sweep, claiming the No. 1 seed.)	San Francisco 49ers	West	13	3	0	.813	5–1	10–2	.504	.466	W2
2 (Note: Green Bay claimed the No. 2 seed over New Orleans based on conference record.)	Green Bay Packers	North	13	3	0	.813	6–0	10–2	.453	.428	W5
3	New Orleans Saints	South	13	3	0	.813	5–1	9–3	.486	.459	W3
4	Philadelphia Eagles	East	9	7	0	.563	5–1	7–5	.455	.417	W4
**Wild Cards**
5	Seattle Seahawks	West	11	5	0	.688	3–3	8–4	.531	.463	L2
6	Minnesota Vikings	North	10	6	0	.625	2–4	7–5	.477	.356	L2
**Did not qualify for the postseason**
7	Los Angeles Rams	West	9	7	0	.563	3–3	7–5	.535	.438	W1
8 (Note: Chicago finished ahead of Dallas based on head-to-head victory.)	Chicago Bears	North	8	8	0	.500	4–2	7–5	.508	.383	W1
9	Dallas Cowboys	East	8	8	0	.500	5–1	7–5	.479	.316	W1
10 (Note: Atlanta finished ahead of Tampa Bay based on division record.)	Atlanta Falcons	South	7	9	0	.438	4–2	6–6	.545	.518	W4
11	Tampa Bay Buccaneers	South	7	9	0	.438	2–4	5–7	.500	.384	L2
12	Arizona Cardinals	West	5	10	1	.344	1–5	3–8–1	.529	.375	L1
13	Carolina Panthers	South	5	11	0	.313	1–5	2–10	.549	.469	L8
14	New York Giants	East	4	12	0	.250	2–4	3–9	.473	.281	L1
15	Detroit Lions	North	3	12	1	.219	0–6	2–9–1	.506	.375	L9
16	Washington Redskins	East	3	13	0	.188	0–6	2–10	.502	.281	L4
**Tiebreakers** (Note: When breaking ties for three or more teams under the NFL's rules, they are first broken within divisions, then comparing only the highest-ranked remaining team from each division.)

== Statistics ==
=== Starters ===
Offense

Pos.	Name	GS
QB	Kyler Murray	16
RB	David Johnson; Kenyan Drake; Chase Edmonds	9; 8; 2
WR1	Larry Fitzgerald	16
WR2	Damiere Byrd; Michael Crabtree; Trent Sherfield	11; 1; 1
WR3	Christian Kirk; KeeSean Johnson	13; 4
TE	Maxx Williams; Charles Clay	10; 10
LT	D.J. Humphries	16
LG	Justin Pugh	16
C	A.Q. Shipley	16
RG	J.R. Sweezy	16
RT	Justin Murray; Mason Cole; Jordan Mills	13; 2; 1

Defense

Pos.	Name	GS
DE	Zach Allen; Jonathan Bullard; Zach Kerr	4; 8; 4
NT	Corey Peters	16
DE	Rodney Gunter; Caraun Reid	13; 3
OLB	Chandler Jones	16
ILB	Haason Reddick	16
ILB	Jordan Hicks	16
OLB	Terrell Suggs; Cassius Marsh	13; 3
CB	Patrick Peterson; Tramaine Brock	10; 6
SS	D.J. Swearinger; Jalen Thompson	4; 12
FS	Budda Baker	16
CB	Byron Murphy	16

Special Teams

Pos.	Name	GS
P	Andy Lee; Ryan Winslow	15; 1
K	Zane Gonzalez	16
LS	Aaron Brewer	16

=== Individual leaders ===
Category	Player(s)	Value
Passing yards	Kyler Murray	3,722
Passing touchdowns	Kyler Murray	20
Rushing yards	Kenyan Drake	643
Rushing touchdowns	Kenyan Drake	8
Receptions	Larry Fitzgerald	75
Receiving yards	Larry Fitzgerald	804
Receiving touchdowns	Larry Fitzgerald; David Johnson	4
Kickoff return yards	Pharoh Cooper	561
Punt return yards	Pharoh Cooper	129
Tackles	Jordan Hicks	150
Sacks	Chandler Jones	19.0
Forced fumbles	Chandler Jones	8
Interceptions	Jordan Hicks	3
Kicking - field goals	Zane Gonzalez	31/35, 88.6%
Kicking - extra points	Zane Gonzalez	34/35, 97.1%

=== Team rankings ===
Category	Value	NFL rank (out of 32)
Passing attempts	554	
Passing completions	355	18th
Passing yards	3,477	24th
Passing touchdowns	20	25th
Interceptions thrown	12	15th
Rushing attempts	396	19th
Rushing yards	1,990	10th
Rushing touchdowns	18	7th
Rushing yards/attempt	5.0	2nd
Total yards of offense	5,467	21st
Points scored	361	16th
Points allowed	442	28th
Passing yards allowed	4,510	31st
Passing touchdowns allowed	38	31st
Rushing attempts against	439	23rd
Rushing yards allowed	1,922	24th
Rushing touchdowns allowed	9	5th
Yards/rush attempt allowed	4.4	20th
Interceptions made	7	30th
Fumbles recovered	10	10th
Total yards allowed	6,432	32nd

Statistics correct as of the end of the 2019 NFL season
