= Mike Vrabel =

American football coach & player (born 1975)

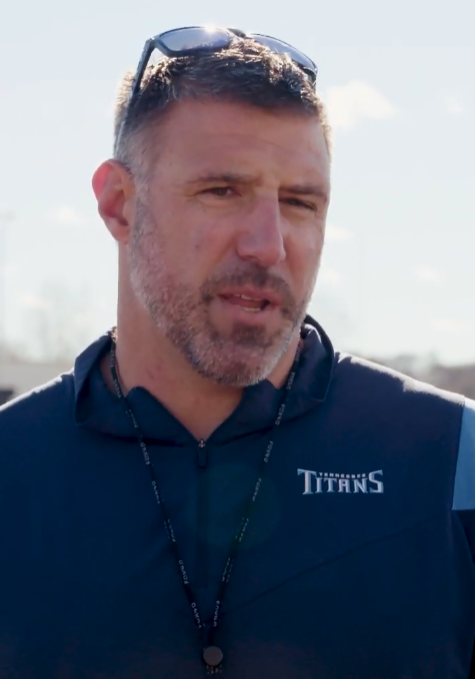
- Vrabel with the Tennessee Titans in 2023

New England Patriots
- Title: Head coach

Personal information
- Born: August 14, 1975 (age 51); Akron, Ohio, U.S.
- Listed height: 6 ft 4 in (1.93 m)
- Listed weight: 261 lb (118 kg)

Career information
- Position: Linebacker (No. 96, 56, 50)
- High school: Walsh Jesuit (Cuyahoga Falls, Ohio)
- College: Ohio State (1993–1996)
- NFL draft: 1997: 3rd round, 91st overall pick

Career history

Playing
- Pittsburgh Steelers (1997–2000); New England Patriots (2001–2008); Kansas City Chiefs (2009–2010)

Coaching
- Ohio State (2011–2013); Linebackers coach (2011); Defensive line coach (2012–2013); Houston Texans (2014–2017); Linebackers coach (2014–2016); Defensive coordinator (2017); Tennessee Titans (2018–2023) Head coach; Cleveland Browns (2024) Coaching and personnel consultant; New England Patriots (2025–present) Head coach

Awards and highlights
- As a player: 3× Super Bowl champion (XXXVI, XXXVIII, XXXIX); First-team All-Pro (2007); Pro Bowl (2007); New England Patriots All-2000s Team; New England Patriots 50th Anniversary Team; New England Patriots All-Dynasty Team; New England Patriots Hall of Fame; Consensus All-American (1996); First-team All-American (1995); 2× Big Ten Defensive Lineman of the Year (1995, 1996); 3× First-team All-Big Ten (1994, 1995, 1996); Ohio State Varsity O Hall of Fame; Ohio State Football All-Century Team; As a head coach: 2× NFL Coach of the Year (2021, 2025); 2× The Sporting News Coach of the Year (2021, 2025)

Career NFL statistics
- Tackles: 762
- Sacks: 57
- Interceptions: 11
- Forced fumbles: 20
- Receptions: 10
- Receiving yards: 14
- Total touchdowns: 12
- Stats at Pro Football Reference

Head coaching record
- Regular season: 70–50 (.583)
- Postseason: 5–4 (.556)
- Career: 75–54 (.581)
- Coaching profile at Pro Football Reference

Michael George Vrabel (/ˈvreɪbəl/ VRAY-bəl; born August 14, 1975) is an American professional football coach and former linebacker who is the head coach for the New England Patriots of the National Football League (NFL). Vrabel previously played in the NFL for 14 seasons, most notably with the Patriots. He also served as the head coach of the Tennessee Titans from 2018 to 2023.

Vrabel played college football for the Ohio State Buckeyes, twice receiving All-American honors. He was selected in the third round of the 1997 NFL draft by the Pittsburgh Steelers, where he spent his first four seasons. Vrabel played his next eight seasons with the Patriots, earning Pro Bowl and first-team All-Pro selections in 2007, along with winning three Super Bowl titles. In his final two seasons, he was a member of the Kansas City Chiefs.

As the head coach of the Titans, Vrabel led the team to three consecutive playoff appearances, two consecutive division titles, and an AFC Championship Game appearance in 2019, the franchise's first since 2002. He was also named NFL Coach of the Year in 2021 after helping the Titans obtain their conference's top seed for the first time since 2008. Vrabel was named head coach of the Patriots in 2025 and led them to an appearance in Super Bowl LX while winning Coach of the Year a second time.

== Early life ==
Vrabel was born on August 14, 1975, in Akron, Ohio. He attended Walsh Jesuit High School in nearby Cuyahoga Falls, where he was a standout on their football team coached by Gerry Rardin.

Vrabel is of Slovak American paternal ancestry - his great-grandfather Andrej Vrábel emigrated to the United States from Krivany in present-day Slovakia. On the maternal line, Mike Vrabel is the grandchild of George and Frances Petroff of Akron, Ohio, parishioners of the Bulgarian American Eastern Orthodox St. Thomas Church. They were Macedonian Patriotic Organization's supporters.

== Playing career ==
=== College ===
Vrabel accepted an athletic scholarship to attend The Ohio State University and played defensive end from 1993 to 1996. He compiled 10 sacks as a sophomore, 12 as a junior, and 48 tackles and nine sacks as a senior.

As a senior in 1996, Vrabel was recognized as a consensus first-team All-American. He finished his career at Ohio State by being named the Big Ten Defensive Lineman of the Year in both 1995 and 1996, becoming the first of two players to ever win the award twice (Wendell Bryant of Wisconsin being the other). Vrabel accumulated 36 sacks and 66 tackles for a loss.

Vrabel was named to the Ohio State Football All-Century Team in 2000, and was inducted into the Ohio State Athletics Hall of Fame in 2012.

=== National Football League ===
Pre-draft measurables
Height	Weight	Arm length	Hand span	40-yard dash	10-yard split	20-yard split	20-yard shuttle	Three-cone drill	Vertical jump	Broad jump	Bench press
6 ft 4 1/8 in (1.93 m)	270 lb (122 kg)	34 1/4 in (0.87 m)	9 5/8 in (0.24 m)	4.93 s	1.70 s	2.88 s	4.43 s	7.77 s	29.5 in (0.75 m)	8 ft 6 in (2.59 m)	23 reps
All values from NFL Combine

==== Pittsburgh Steelers ====
Vrabel was selected by the Pittsburgh Steelers in the third round (91st overall) of the 1997 NFL draft. He spent the first four seasons of his career in Pittsburgh. Vrabel's most notable play as a Steeler came in his rookie season after strip-sacking Drew Bledsoe in the 1997–98 AFC Divisional Playoffs to clinch a 7–6 victory for the Steelers and advance them to the AFC Championship Game. Vrabel had 12 tackles and 2.5 sacks in 1998; nine tackles and two sacks in 1999; and 15 tackles, a sack, and a fumble recovery in 2000.

==== New England Patriots ====
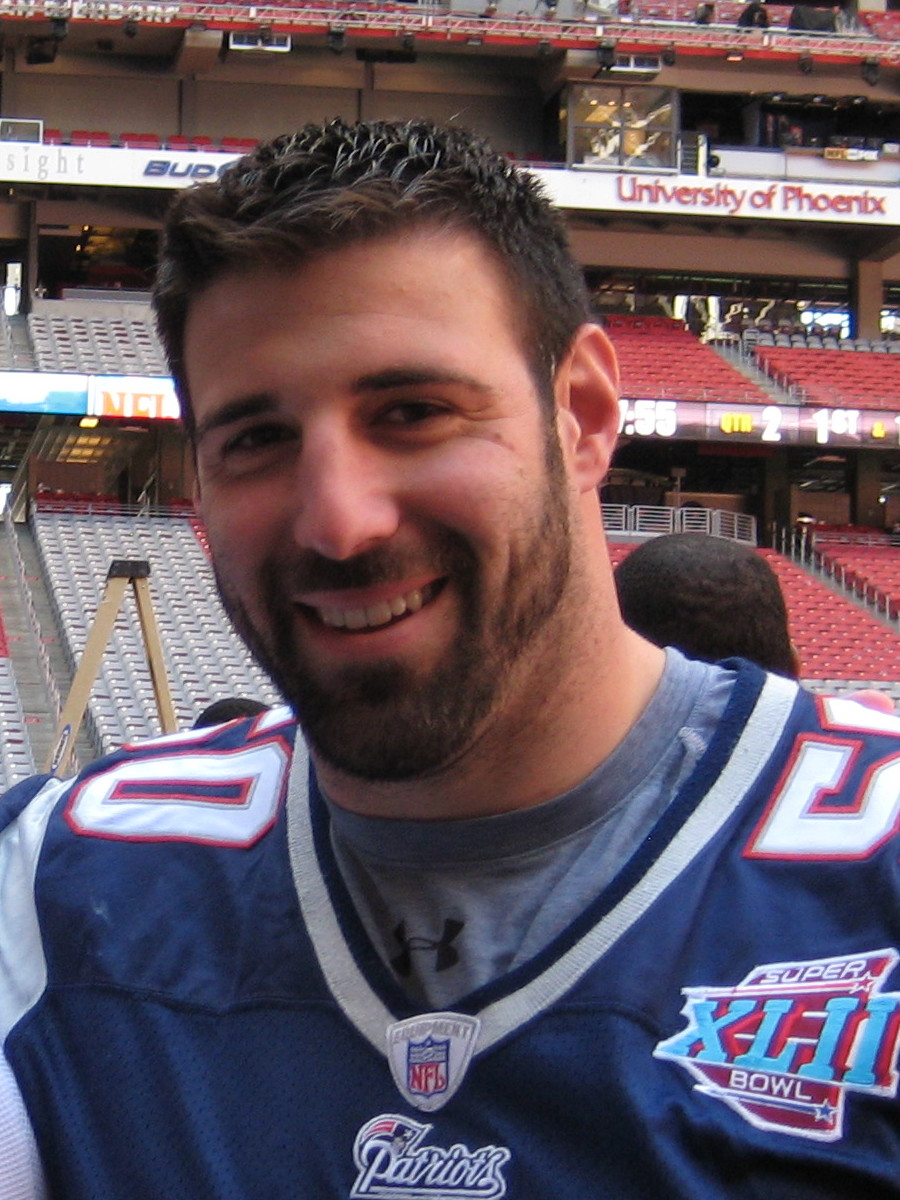
Vrabel in 2008

Vrabel joined the New England Patriots as a free agent in 2001. He played in every game on defense, starting in 12. Vrabel would remain a regular starter on defense during his eight-year tenure in New England.

During his first four seasons with the Patriots, Vrabel's primary position was right outside linebacker in the Patriots' 3–4 scheme. In 2005, because of the limited effectiveness of inside backers Monty Beisel and Chad Brown, Vrabel moved to inside linebacker although he had never before played inside in the NFL. Rosevelt Colvin successfully filled Vrabel's old spot, and many cite the change in positions as a major contributor to the Patriots' rebound in the second half of the season. Vrabel moved inside again late in the 2006 season after Junior Seau suffered a broken arm.

Vrabel's best season with the team was in 2007, when he was selected as a Pro Bowl starter and named to the NFL All-Pro team. In Week 8 of that season, Vrabel forced three fumbles, had three sacks, recovered an onside kick, and scored an offensive touchdown against the Washington Redskins, and was named AFC Defensive Player of the Week.

Vrabel would occasionally come in as an eligible receiver, lining up as a tight end. Head coach Bill Belichick took advantage of this in 2004 in Super Bowl XXXVIII. In the fourth quarter, Tom Brady threw a one-yard touchdown pass to Vrabel, making Vrabel the first defensive player to score a Super Bowl touchdown on offense since William "Refrigerator" Perry did so for the Chicago Bears in Super Bowl XX in 1986 (against the Patriots). Vrabel was one of the defensive stars of the game as well, with two sacks and a forced fumble. The next year, in Super Bowl XXXIX in 2005, Vrabel again caught a two-yard touchdown pass despite being held by the Eagles' Jevon Kearse, a feat pictured on the cover of the 2005 NFL Record and Fact Book. The reception made him one of 17 players to catch two or more touchdown passes in Super Bowls.

Across the regular season and playoffs, Vrabel finished with 12 career receptions in just 16 targets, all for touchdowns. He caught one in 2002, two in 2004, three in 2005, and two in 2007 in the regular season, and one each in Super Bowls XXXVIII and XXXIX, all with the Patriots, and one each in 2009 and 2010 with the Chiefs (thrown by former Patriot Matt Cassel). On December 26, 2005, on the final Monday Night Football game on ABC, Vrabel became, according to the Elias Sports Bureau, the first player to have two touchdown catches and a sack in the same game since sacks began to be recorded officially in 1982. In addition to his 12 touchdowns on offense, Vrabel recorded his only career defensive touchdown on an interception return in the 2005 season. In 2007, NFL Network ranked him seventh on their Top 10 list of Most Versatile Players.

==== Kansas City Chiefs ====
On February 27, 2009, the Patriots traded Vrabel to the Kansas City Chiefs for what was originally announced as an undisclosed draft pick. The next day, it was revealed that Patriots traded both Vrabel and Matt Cassel in exchange for the Chiefs' second round pick, the 34th overall selection in the 2009 NFL draft. Vrabel played in Kansas City for two seasons as a starter before retiring.

== NFL career statistics ==
Legend
	Won the Super Bowl
**Bold**	Career high

=== Regular season ===
Year	Team	Games		Tackles				Interceptions						Fumbles				Receiving		
Year	Team	GP	GS	Cmb	Solo	Ast	Sck	Int	Yds	Avg	Lng	TD	PD	FF	FR	Yds	TD	Rec	Yds	TD
1997	PIT	15	0	17	14	3	1.5	0	0	0.0	0	0	0	2	1	0	0	0	0	0
1998	PIT	11	0	9	6	3	3.5	0	0	0.0	0	0	0	0	0	0	0	0	0	0
1999	PIT	10	0	5	4	1	2.0	0	0	0.0	0	0	0	1	1	0	0	0	0	0
2000	PIT	15	0	5	3	2	1.0	0	0	0.0	0	0	0	0	1	0	0	0	0	0
2001	NE	16	12	63	40	23	3.0	2	**27**	**13.5**	15	0	**9**	0	0	0	0	0	0	0
2002	NE	16	13	82	58	24	4.5	1	0	0.0	0	0	5	0	**2**	0	0	1	1	1
2003	NE	13	9	52	37	15	9.5	2	18	9.0	14	0	4	**4**	1	0	0	0	0	0
2004	NE	16	15	71	54	17	5.5	0	0	0.0	0	0	3	0	0	0	0	2	3	2
2005	NE	16	16	**108**	**73**	**35**	4.5	2	23	11.5	**24T**	**1**	5	1	0	0	0	**3**	**4**	**3**
2006	NE	16	16	89	54	**35**	4.5	**3**	0	0.0	2	0	4	3	1	0	0	0	0	0
2007	NE	16	15	77	55	22	**12.5**	0	0	0.0	0	0	0	**4**	0	0	0	2	3	2
2008	NE	16	14	62	40	22	4.0	1	5	5.0	5	0	4	1	1	0	0	0	0	0
2009	KC	14	14	52	43	9	2.0	0	0	0.0	0	0	6	2	1	0	0	1	1	1
2010	KC	16	16	48	30	18	0.0	0	0	0.0	0	0	1	1	0	0	0	1	2	1
Career		206	140	740	511	229	58.0	11	73	6.7	24T	1	41	19	9	0	0	10	14	10

=== Postseason ===
Year	Team	Games		Tackles				Interceptions						Fumbles				Receiving		
Year	Team	GP	GS	Cmb	Solo	Ast	Sck	Int	Yds	Avg	Lng	TD	PD	FF	FR	Yds	TD	Rec	Yds	TD
1997	PIT	2	0	1	1	0	1.0	0	0	0.0	0	0	0	0	0	0	0	0	0	0
2001	NE	3	3	11	7	4	0.0	0	0	0.0	0	0	0	0	0	0	0	0	0	0
2003	NE	3	3	18	**15**	3	**3.0**	0	0	0.0	0	0	**1**	**1**	0	0	0	**1**	1	**1**
2004	NE	3	3	14	11	3	2.0	0	0	0.0	0	0	0	**1**	**1**	**1**	0	**1**	**2**	**1**
2005	NE	2	2	15	8	**7**	1.0	0	0	0.0	0	0	0	0	0	0	0	0	0	0
2006	NE	3	3	**20**	**15**	5	2.0	0	0	0.0	0	0	**1**	**1**	0	0	0	0	0	0
2007	NE	3	3	6	3	3	0.0	0	0	0.0	0	0	**1**	0	**1**	0	0	0	0	0
2010	KC	1	1	3	0	3	0.0	0	0	0.0	0	0	0	0	0	0	0	0	0	0
Career		20	18	88	60	28	9.0	0	0	0.0	0	0	3	3	2	1	0	2	3	2

== Coaching career ==
=== Ohio State ===
Vrabel retired on July 10, 2011, to become the linebackers coach at Ohio State. On December 21, new Ohio State head coach Urban Meyer decided to keep Vrabel on as part of his coaching staff as defensive line coach.

=== Houston Texans ===
On January 10, 2014, Vrabel was hired by the Houston Texans as a linebackers coach. During his three seasons as linebackers coach, the Texans ranked third in the NFL in yards allowed per game. In January 2016, news outlets reported that the San Francisco 49ers offered Vrabel their defensive coordinator job, but he declined the offer and stayed in Houston. In January 2017, the Texans named Vrabel as their defensive coordinator after the team moved previous coordinator Romeo Crennel to assistant head coach. Vrabel coached players such as J. J. Watt, Jadeveon Clowney, Whitney Mercilus, and Benardrick McKinney during his tenure in Houston.

=== Tennessee Titans ===
==== 2018 season ====
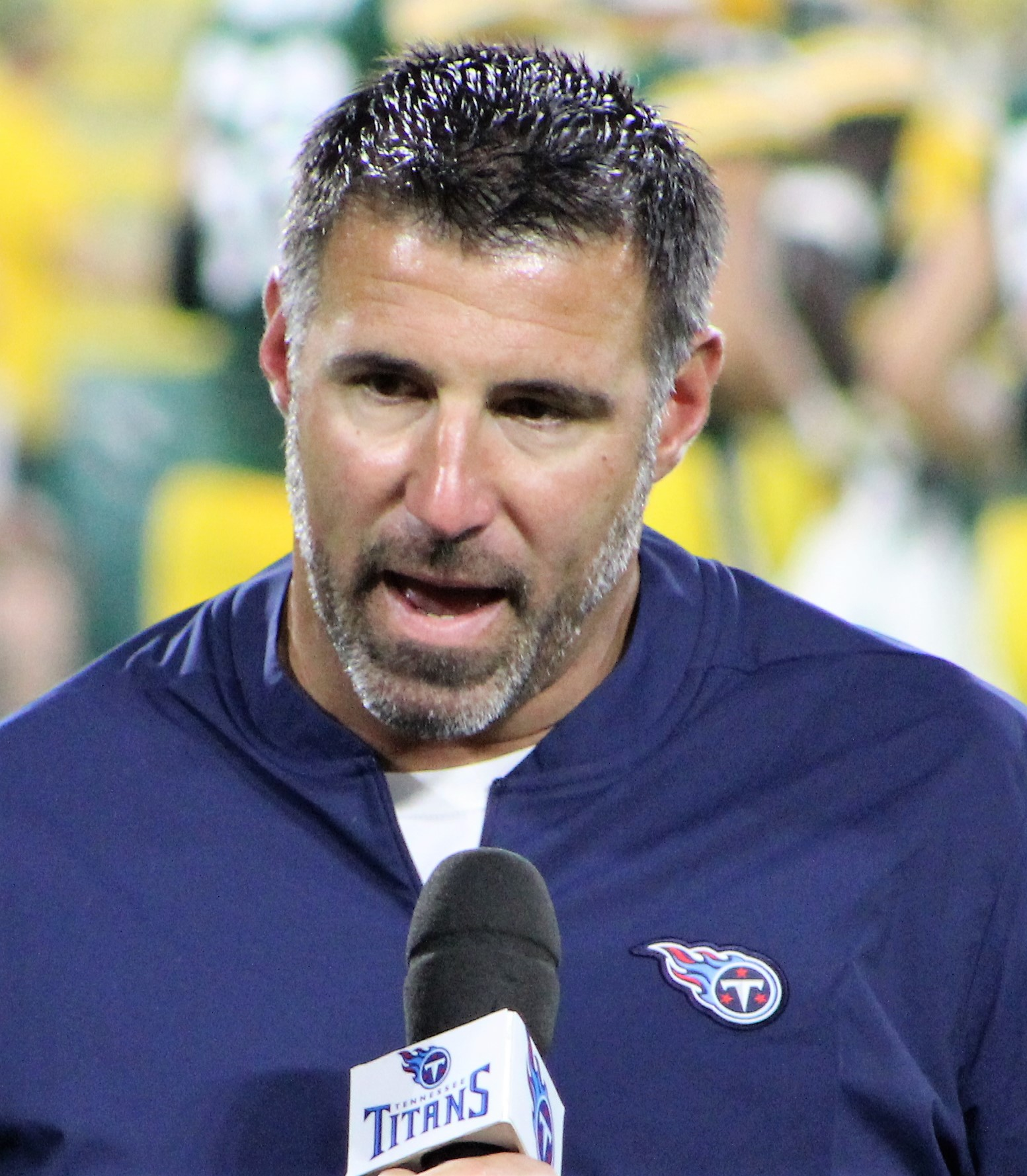
Vrabel in 2018

On January 20, 2018, Vrabel was hired as the head coach of the Tennessee Titans on a five-year deal.

During Week 2 against the Houston Texans, Vrabel earned his first career win as a head coach as the Titans won by a score of 20–17. Two weeks later, Vrabel led the Titans to a 26–23 overtime victory over the defending Super Bowl champion Philadelphia Eagles. During Week 10, he beat his former longtime coach Bill Belichick and the New England Patriots in a 34–10 victory.

Under Vrabel, the Titans' defense improved from the 13th-ranked defense in 2017 to the eighth-ranked defense in 2018. However, the team narrowly missed the playoffs by one game and finished the season with a 9–7 record.

==== 2019 season ====
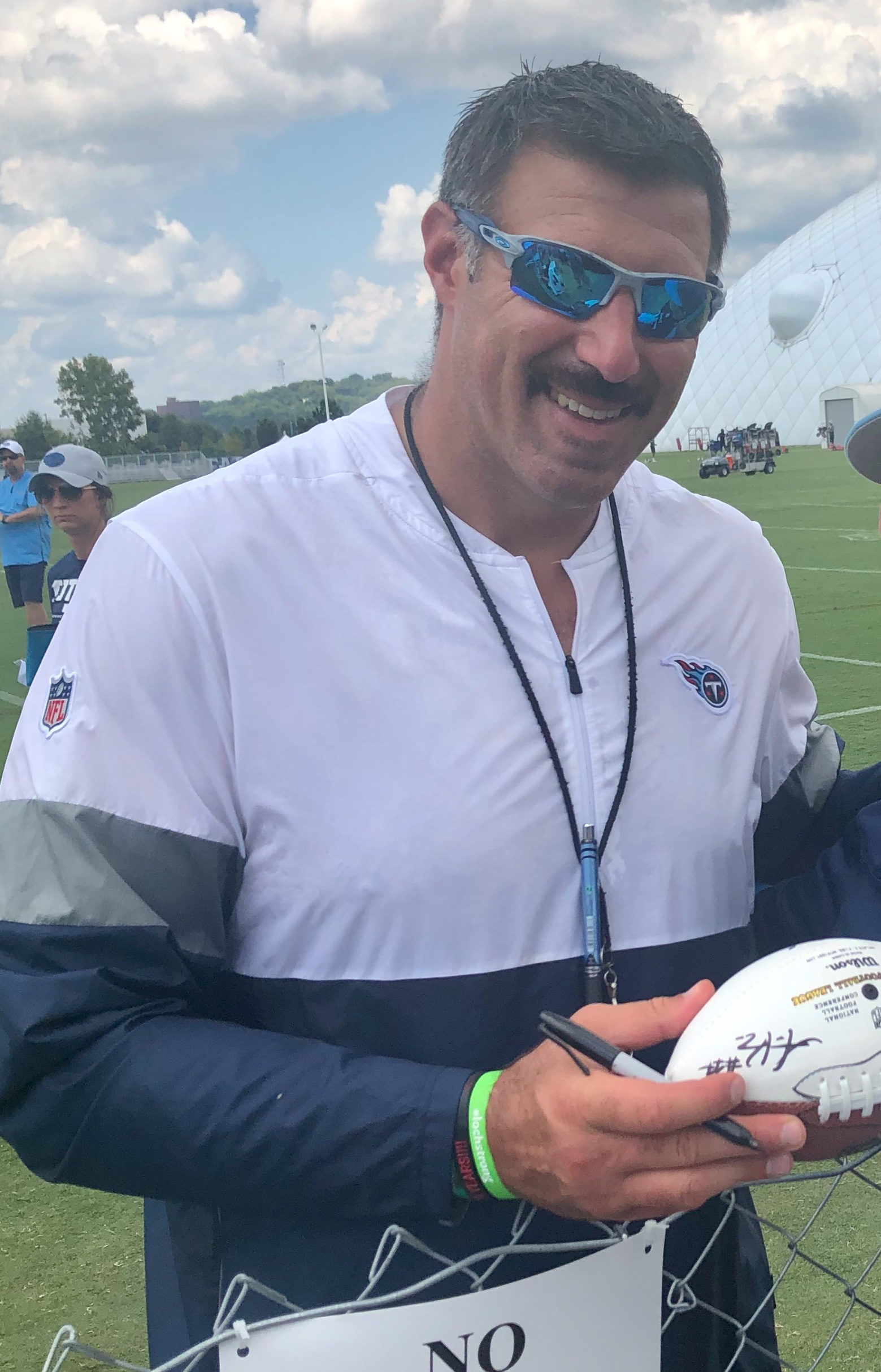
Vrabel in 2019

The 2019 season saw the Titans again finish 9–7; however, this would be enough to make the playoffs as the #6-seed. During a Week 6 16–0 shutout road loss to the Denver Broncos, Vrabel elected to bench quarterback Marcus Mariota in favor of Ryan Tannehill, a move that led to the Titans winning seven of their final 10 games despite starting 2–4.

During the Wild Card Round, Tennessee upset the defending Super Bowl champion Patriots on the road 20–13, led by running back Derrick Henry's 204 yards from scrimmage. The Titans then pulled off another upset in the Divisional Round against the #1-seed Baltimore Ravens, winning on the road 28–12 behind another breakout performance from Henry with 202 scrimmage yards along with a passing touchdown on a trick play. With the victory, the Titans advanced to their first AFC Championship since 2002, where they were eliminated on the road by the eventual Super Bowl LIV champion Kansas City Chiefs 35–24.

==== 2020 season ====
Titans defensive coordinator Dean Pees retired on January 20, 2020, after spending the last two seasons with the team. Vrabel decided not to hire a defensive coordinator for the season.

After starting the season 5–0, their first since 2008, the Titans finished with an 11–5 record, improving upon their 9–7 record from the previous four years and earning their first double-digit winning season and division title since 2008. However, the Titans lost to the Ravens 20–13 in the Wild Card Round. Following the loss, Vrabel revealed that outside linebackers coach Shane Bowen was the defensive coordinator in all but the title and that Bowen made the defensive play calls.

==== 2021 season ====
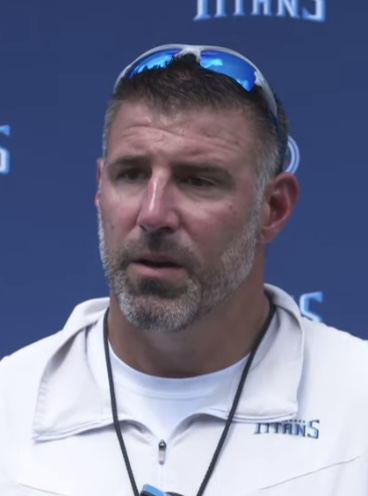
Vrabel in 2021

The Titans dealt with numerous injuries throughout the season, but were able to overcome all of them en route to a 12–5 record, a division title, and the #1-seed in the AFC. The team fielded 91 players during the season (mostly due to injury and COVID-19), breaking the old NFL record of 84 held by the 2019 Miami Dolphins and 2020 San Francisco 49ers.

With the division title, Vrabel helped the Titans clinch the AFC South for the second consecutive season. This would be the first time since 1960–1962 that the franchise would win their division in back-to-back seasons. However, the season ended with a 19–16 upset loss in the Divisional Round to the eventual AFC champion Cincinnati Bengals, their third-straight playoff loss dating back three seasons. For his work that season, Vrabel was named AP Coach of the Year.

==== 2022 season ====
On February 8, 2022, Vrabel and general manager Jon Robinson were given contract extensions.

The Titans began the season with a 7–3 record, putting them in a prime position to secure a playoff spot. However, the team lost seven straight games and ended up missing the playoffs, finishing with a 7–10 record.

==== 2023 season ====
After the Titans finished the 2023 season with a 6–11 record, Vrabel was fired on January 9, 2024. He finished his tenure in Tennessee with a 54–45 (.545) regular-season record and a 2–3 (.400) playoff record for a combined record of 56–48 (.538).

=== Cleveland Browns ===
After not landing a coordinator or head coaching job in the offseason, Vrabel signed a one-year contract with the Cleveland Browns as a coaching and personnel consultant on March 15, 2024.

=== New England Patriots ===
==== 2025 season ====
On January 12, 2025, Vrabel was hired as the head coach of the New England Patriots, replacing Jerod Mayo. In a November postgame interview, Vrabel cited his familiarity with the franchise and quarterback Drake Maye's potential as reasons for returning as coach.

Vrabel led the Patriots to a 14–3 record, giving the team its first playoff berth since 2021, its first AFC East title since 2019, and its best record since 2016. By Week 11, the Patriots were 9–2, surpassing their combined win total for the 2023 and 2024 seasons. They won 10 games in a row, making Vrabel the first (and only) head coach since the AFL–NFL merger to do so in his first season with a team that won no more than five games the previous season.

During the Wild Card Round, the Patriots defeated the Los Angeles Chargers 16–3, advancing to the Divisional Round. It was their first playoff win since 2018. Vrabel also earned his second trip to the AFC Championship Game as a coach, and his first since a 2019 loss with the Titans, after defeating the Houston Texans 28–16. During the AFC Championship Game, the Patriots defeated the Denver Broncos on the road 10–7, advancing to Super Bowl LX. Vrabel became the eighth head coach to reach the Super Bowl in their first season, and joined an exclusive club of making the Super Bowl as a player and as a coach. Vrabel was named AP Coach of the Year for his work in 2025. However, Vrabel couldn’t finish off his strong year with a Super Bowl win as the Patriots lost to the Seahawks 29–13.

== Head coaching record ==
Team	Year	Regular season					Postseason			
Team	Year	Won	Lost	Ties	Win %	Finish	Won	Lost	Win %	Result
TEN	2018	9	7	0	.563	3rd in AFC South	—	—	—	—
TEN	2019	9	7	0	.563	2nd in AFC South	2	1	.667	Lost to Kansas City Chiefs in AFC Championship Game
TEN	2020	11	5	0	.688	1st in AFC South	0	1	.000	Lost to Baltimore Ravens in AFC Wild Card Round
TEN	2021	12	5	0	.706	1st in AFC South	0	1	.000	Lost to Cincinnati Bengals in AFC Divisional Round
TEN	2022	7	10	0	.412	2nd in AFC South	—	—	—	—
TEN	2023	6	11	0	.353	4th in AFC South	—	—	—	—
TEN total		54	45	0	.545		2	3	.400	
NE	2025	14	3	0	.824	1st in AFC East	3	1	.750	Lost to Seattle Seahawks in Super Bowl LX
NE	2026	5	5	0	.500	TBD in AFC East				
NE total		19	8	0	.704		3	1	.750	
Total		73	53	0	.579		5	4	.555	

== Personal life ==
Vrabel and his wife, Jennifer, have two sons, including Tyler, who started at offensive tackle for the Boston College Eagles football team for three years and declared for the 2022 NFL draft. He went undrafted but signed with the Atlanta Falcons in the 2022 preseason, and played in two regular-season games with the Falcons during the 2023 season.

Vrabel founded the "Mike's Second and Seven Foundation" with his former Ohio State teammates Ryan Miller and Luke Fickell to promote literacy in the central Ohio area.

In March 2011, Vrabel was arrested for an alleged theft at Belterra Casino Resort & Spa in Florence, Indiana. He was released on a $600 bond after five hours. A gaming agent claimed to witness Vrabel take "bottles of alcohol from a deli" without payment. Vrabel, communicating through his agent, characterized the matter as "an unfortunate misunderstanding," further stating that he took "full responsibility for the miscommunication."

On April 7, 2026, Page Six published photographs of Vrabel with The Athletic NFL reporter Dianna Russini at a resort in Sedona, Arizona. The publication raised widespread speculation online that an extramarital affair was taking place between the two. Vrabel denied the notion of an affair, stating the photos depicted a "completely innocent interaction and any suggestion otherwise is laughable." On April 22, Vrabel announced he was entering counseling after photos were published of him kissing Russini in a bar in 2020.
