= Zach Allen =

American football player (born 1997)

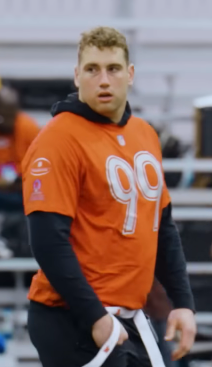
- Allen at the 2026 Pro Bowl Games

No. 99 – Denver Broncos
- Position: Defensive end
- Roster status: Active

Personal information
- Born: August 20, 1997 (age 29); New Canaan, Connecticut, U.S.
- Listed height: 6 ft 5 in (1.96 m)
- Listed weight: 285 lb (129 kg)

Career information
- High school: New Canaan
- College: Boston College (2015–2018)
- NFL draft: 2019: 3rd round, 65th overall pick

Career history
- Arizona Cardinals (2019–2022); Denver Broncos (2023–present)

Awards and highlights
- First-team All-Pro (2025); Second-team All-Pro (2024); Pro Bowl (2025); Nils V. "Swede" Nelson Award (2018); Second-team All-ACC (2018)

Career NFL statistics as of Week 2, 2026
- Total tackles: 303
- Sacks: 34
- Forced fumbles: 1
- Fumble recoveries: 3
- Interceptions: 1
- Pass deflections: 23
- Defensive touchdowns: 1
- Stats at Pro Football Reference

Zachary William-Jacob Allen (born August 20, 1997) is an American professional football defensive end for the Denver Broncos of the National Football League (NFL). He played college football for the Boston College Eagles.

== College career ==
As a freshman in 2015, Allen played in all 12 games of the regular season, primarily as a member of the special teams unit. He participated in 66 plays on special teams and 46 plays at defensive end. In the first game of his collegiate career, Allen registered an assisted tackle in the season opener vs. Maine and recorded one solo tackle against Howard.

In 2016, Allen played in 13 games (2016 Quick Lane Bowl), making one start against Georgia Tech in Dublin. Allen recorded 36 tackles on the season, including 19 solo tackles, and 17 assists, as well as 6.0 sacks. On the year he deflected 4 passes and had 2 fumble recoveries. In the 2016 Quick Lane Bowl, Allen played a big part in the victory over the Maryland Terrapins, recording a single-game career high of 2 sacks for a loss of 15 yards, along with 2 solo tackles.

In 2017, Allen was promoted to a full-time starting defensive end and started in all 13 games (2017 Pinstripe Bowl). Allen had a career year: He had 47 solo tackles and 53 assists, with 15.5 tackles for loss, a 5.5 improvement. Allen was one of only two defensive lineman to record at least 100 tackles. Despite the leap in tackles, his sack production dropped to 4.0, 2.0 fewer than the 6.0 he recorded in 2016. Allen recorded 1 interception and deflected 3 passes. After posting a career-high 14 tackles against Virginia Tech, Allen was named the Atlantic Coast Conference Defensive lineman of the week. After the season, Allen won the Bulger Love Award, given to New England's best offensive and defensive NCAA football players. There was speculation that Allen would declare for the 2018 NFL draft after his junior season, but he later announced that he would return to school for his senior year.

In 2018, Allen played in all 12 regular season games; however, he did not participate in the 2018 First Responder Bowl. On the year, Allen proved to still be quite productive, recording 26 solo tackles, 35 assists, and 15.0 tackles for loss. Allen had a career-high for sacks in 2018, recording 6.5, a 0.5 improvement over his 2016 record. Allen tallied 1 interception, which was returned for 6 yards, and deflected a career-high 7 passes, doubling all of his previous years' deflected passes combined. He also had 2 fumble recoveries and his first career forced fumble.

== Professional career ==
Pre-draft measurables
Height	Weight	Arm length	Hand span	Wingspan	40-yard dash	10-yard split	20-yard split	20-yard shuttle	Three-cone drill	Vertical jump	Broad jump	Bench press	Wonderlic
6 ft 4 1/8 in (1.93 m)	281 lb (127 kg)	34 3/4 in (0.88 m)	10 1/8 in (0.26 m)	6 ft 7 7/8 in (2.03 m)	5.00 s	1.65 s	2.91 s	4.36 s	7.34 s	32.0 in (0.81 m)	9 ft 4 in (2.84 m)	24 reps	36
All values from NFL Scouting Combine

=== Arizona Cardinals ===
Allen was selected by the Arizona Cardinals with the 65th overall pick in the third round of the 2019 NFL draft. Following training camp, Allen was named a starting defensive end to start the season. Allen started for the Cardinals in his debut during Week 1 of the 2019 season against the Detroit Lions. During the game, Allen recorded three solo tackles. He played in the first four games before suffering a neck injury in Week 4. He missed the next six games before being placed on injured reserve on November 13, 2019.

In Week 1 of the 2020 season against the San Francisco 49ers, Allen recorded his first career sack on Jimmy Garoppolo during the 24–20 win. He was placed on injured reserve on October 27, 2020. He was activated on November 28, 2020. In Week 15 against the Philadelphia Eagles, Allen led the team with 11 tackles and sacked Jalen Hurts once during the 33–26 win.

Allen entered the 2021 season as a starting defensive end. He played in 15 games with 14 starts, recording 48 tackles, four sacks, and three fumble recoveries. In 2022 his production continued to improve, logging 47 tackles, five and a half sacks, ten tackles-for-loss, and eight pass deflections across 13 starts. Allen credited much of his growth as a player during his last two seasons with the Cardinals to the mentorship of teammate and three-time Defensive Player of the Year recipient J. J. Watt, who was also a defensive end for Arizona from 2021 to 2022.

=== Denver Broncos ===
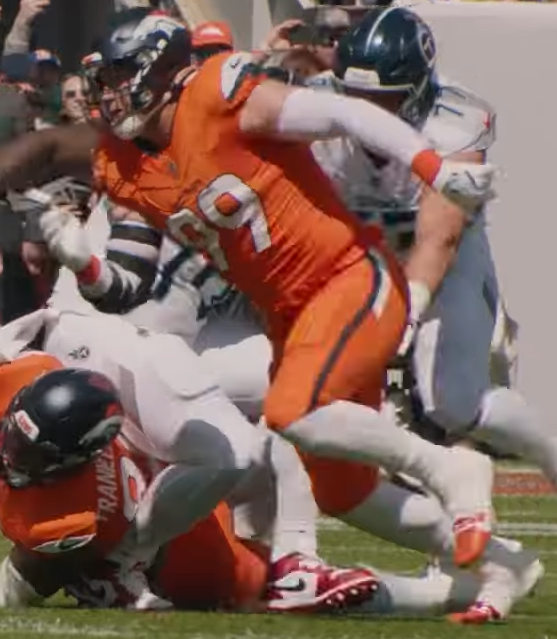
Allen with the Broncos in 2025

On March 15, 2023, Allen signed a three-year, $45.75 million contract with the Denver Broncos, following his former defensive coordinator with the Cardinals, Vance Joseph. Replacing Dre'Mont Jones as the Broncos starting left defensive end, Allen recorded 60 tackles, eight tackles-for-loss, five sacks, and a forced fumble.

During the 2024 season, Allen recorded 8.5 sacks, 15 tackle-for-losses, and a safety, and was named a Second-team All-Pro. Allen joined Nick Bosa, Aaron Donald, J. J. Watt, and T. J. Watt as the only players to ever record 40 or more quarterback hits in a single season. In contrast with the rotational nature of defensive line positions in professional football, Allen led all defensive linemen in 2024 in snaps played at 964, over one hundred more than the next highest player. On the NFL Top 100 Players of 2025, Allen was ranked as the 90th best player in the league by his fellow NFL players.

On August 2, 2025, Allen signed a four-year, $102 million contract extension with the Broncos.

After recording 7 sacks and a league-leading 47 quarterback hits during the 2025 season, Allen received his first Pro Bowl and first-team All-Pro nods. He was later ranked the 73rd best player in the league on the NFL Top 100 Players of 2026 list.

== Career statistics ==
=== NFL ===
Legend
	Led the league
**Bold**	Career high

==== Regular season ====
Year	Team	Games		Tackles						Interceptions						Fumbles				
Year	Team	GP	GS	Cmb	Solo	Ast	Sck	TFL	Sfty	Int	Yds	Avg	Lng	TD	PD	FF	Fum	FR	Yds	TD
2019	ARI	4	1	8	6	2	0.0	1	0	0	0	0.0	0	0	0	0	0	0	0	0
2020	ARI	13	7	35	20	15	2.0	5	0	0	0	0.0	0	0	3	0	0	0	0	0
2021	ARI	15	14	48	30	18	4.0	5	0	**1**	**25**	**25.0**	**25**	0	4	0	0	**3**	**27**	**1**
2022	ARI	13	13	47	23	24	5.5	10	0	0	0	0.0	0	0	**8**	0	0	0	0	0
2023	DEN	17	17	60	27	**33**	5.0	8	0	0	0	0.0	0	0	1	**1**	0	0	0	0
2024	DEN	16	16	**61**	**32**	29	**8.5**	**15**	**1**	0	0	0.0	0	0	1	0	0	0	0	0
2025	DEN	17	17	38	14	24	7.0	4	0	0	0	0.0	0	0	6	0	0	0	0	0
Career		95	85	297	152	145	32.0	48	1	1	25	25.0	25	0	23	1	0	3	27	1

==== Postseason ====
Year	Team	Games		Tackles						Interceptions						Fumbles				
Year	Team	GP	GS	Cmb	Solo	Ast	Sck	TFL	Sfty	Int	Yds	Avg	Lng	TD	PD	FF	Fum	FR	Yds	TD
2021	ARI	1	1	4	1	**3**	0.0	0	0	0	0	0.0	0	0	0	0	0	0	0	0
2024	DEN	1	1	5	4	1	1.0	**2**	0	0	0	0.0	0	0	0	0	0	0	0	0
2025	DEN	2	2	**9**	**6**	**3**	**1.5**	0	0	0	0	0.0	0	0	0	0	0	0	0	0
Career		4	4	18	11	7	2.5	2	0	0	0	0.0	0	0	0	0	0	0	0	0

=== College ===
Season	Team	Class	Pos	GP	Tackles					Interceptions					Fumbles			
Season	Team	Class	Pos	GP	Solo	Ast	Cmb	TfL	Sck	Int	Yds	Avg	TD	PD	FR	Yds	TD	FF
2015	Boston College	FR	DE	2	1	1	2	0	0.0	0	0	0.0	0	0	0	0	0	0
2016	Boston College	SO	DE	10	19	17	36	10	6.0	0	0	0.0	0	4	2	0	0	0
2017	Boston College	JR	DE	13	47	53	100	15.5	4.0	1	0	0.0	0	4	0	0	0	0
2018	Boston College	SR	DE	12	26	35	61	15	6.5	1	6	6.0	0	7	2	0	0	1
Career				37	93	106	199	40.5	16.5	2	6	3.0	0	15	4	0	0	1
