= 2018 Boston College Eagles football team =

American college football season

2018 Boston College Eagles football

First Responder Bowl, no contest vs. Boise State
- Conference: Atlantic Coast Conference
- Atlantic Division
- Record: 7–5 (4–4 ACC)
- Head coach: Steve Addazio (6th season)
- Offensive coordinator: Scot Loeffler (3rd season)
- Offensive scheme: Multiple
- Co-defensive coordinators: Jim Reid (4th season); Anthony Campanile (1st season)
- Base defense: 4–3
- Captains: Jon Baker; Will Harris
- Home stadium: Alumni Stadium

Uniform
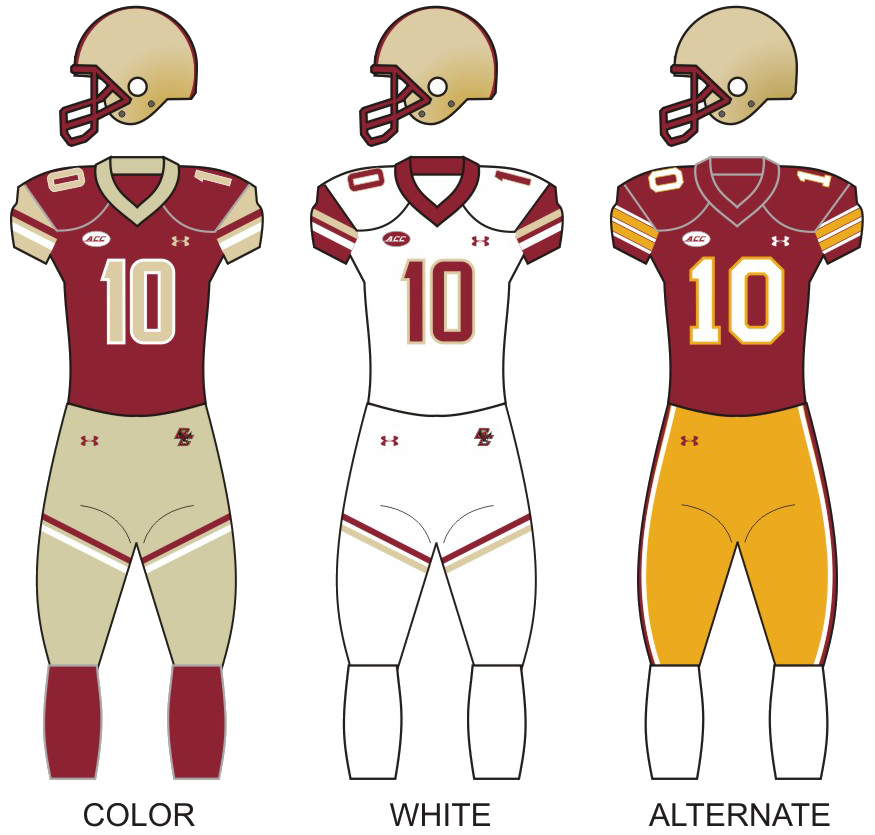

2018 Atlantic Coast Conference football standings
	Conf.			Overall
Team	W		L	W		L
Atlantic Division
No. 1 Clemson x$#^	8	–	0	15	–	0
No. 15 Syracuse	6	–	2	10	–	3
NC State	5	–	3	9	–	4
Boston College	4	–	4	7	–	5
Wake Forest	3	–	5	7	–	6
Florida State	3	–	5	5	–	7
Louisville	0	–	8	2	–	10
Coastal Division
Pittsburgh x	6	–	2	7	–	7
Georgia Tech	5	–	3	7	–	6
Miami (FL)	4	–	4	7	–	6
Virginia	4	–	4	8	–	5
Virginia Tech	4	–	4	6	–	7
Duke	3	–	5	8	–	5
North Carolina	1	–	7	2	–	9
Championship: Clemson 42, Pittsburgh 10
# – College Football Playoff champion; ^ – College Football Playoff participant; $ – Conference champion; x – Division champion/co-champions; Rankings from AP Poll

The 2018 Boston College Eagles football team represented Boston College during the 2018 NCAA Division I FBS football season. The Eagles played their home games at Alumni Stadium in Chestnut Hill, Massachusetts, and competed in the Atlantic Division of the Atlantic Coast Conference. They were led by sixth-year head coach Steve Addazio. They finished the season 7–5 overall and 4–4 in ACC play to place the fourth in the Atlantic Division. They were invited to the First Responder Bowl against Boise State. With 5:08 left in the first quarter and Boston College leading 7–0, the bowl game was stopped because of bad weather and ultimately canceled and ruled a no contest.

== Recruiting ==
=== Position key ===
Back	B	Center	C	Cornerback	CB	Defensive back	DB
Defensive end	DE	Defensive lineman	DL	Defensive tackle	DT	End	E
Fullback	FB	Guard	G	Halfback	HB	Kicker	K
Kickoff returner	KR	Offensive tackle	OT	Offensive lineman	OL	Linebacker	LB
Long snapper	LS	Punter	P	Punt returner	PR	Quarterback	QB
Running back	RB	Safety	S	Tight end	TE	Wide receiver	WR

=== Recruits ===
The Eagles signed a total of 20 recruits.

College recruiting information (2018)
Name	Hometown	School	Height	Weight	Commit date
Jehlani Galloway; WR	Providence, Rhode Island	Classical High School	6 ft 1 in (1.85 m)	175 lb (79 kg)	Mar 19, 2017
Jehlani Galloway; WR	Recruit ratings: Scout: Rivals: 247Sports: ESPN:				
Joey Luchetti; TE	Groton, Massachusetts	Lawrence Academy	6 ft 6 in (1.98 m)	240 lb (110 kg)	Mar 20, 2017
Joey Luchetti; TE	Recruit ratings: Scout: Rivals: 247Sports: ESPN:				
John Tessitore; K	Wallingford, Connecticut	Choate Rosemary Hall	6 ft 0 in (1.83 m)	170 lb (77 kg)	Mar 25, 2017
John Tessitore; K	Recruit ratings: Scout: Rivals: 247Sports: ESPN:				
Kyiev Bennermon; DT	Poughkeepsie, New York	Spackenkill High School	6 ft 4 in (1.93 m)	280 lb (130 kg)	Mar 28, 2017
Kyiev Bennermon; DT	Recruit ratings: Scout: Rivals: 247Sports: ESPN:				
John Langan; QB	Wayne, New Jersey	Bergen Catholic High School	6 ft 3 in (1.91 m)	220 lb (100 kg)	Apr 29, 2017
John Langan; QB	Recruit ratings: Scout: Rivals: 247Sports: ESPN:				
Matt Valecce; QB	The Bronx, New York	Fordham Preparatory School	6 ft 5 in (1.96 m)	205 lb (93 kg)	May 6, 2017
Matt Valecce; QB	Recruit ratings: Scout: Rivals: 247Sports: ESPN:				
Evan Stewart; S	Sparta, New Jersey	Saint Joseph Regional High School	6 ft 1 in (1.85 m)	205 lb (93 kg)	May 7, 2017
Evan Stewart; S	Recruit ratings: Scout: 247Sports: ESPN:				
Finn Dirstine; OG	Acton, Massachusetts	Lawrence Academy	6 ft 5 in (1.96 m)	320 lb (150 kg)	May 10, 2017
Finn Dirstine; OG	Recruit ratings: Scout: Rivals: 247Sports: ESPN:				
Ryan Betro; DT	Groton, Massachusetts	Lawrence Academy	6 ft 4 in (1.93 m)	280 lb (130 kg)	May 11, 2017
Ryan Betro; DT	Recruit ratings: Scout: Rivals: 247Sports: ESPN:				
Hugh Davis; LB	Indianapolis, Indiana	Cathedral High School	6 ft 1 in (1.85 m)	215 lb (98 kg)	May 26, 2017
Hugh Davis; LB	Recruit ratings: Scout: Rivals: 247Sports: ESPN:				
Vinny DePalma; LB	Wayne, New Jersey	DePaul Catholic High School	6 ft 1 in (1.85 m)	215 lb (98 kg)	May 27, 2017
Vinny DePalma; LB	Recruit ratings: Scout: Rivals: 247Sports: ESPN:				
Joe Sparacio; LB	Naples, Florida	First Baptist Academy	6 ft 0 in (1.83 m)	215 lb (98 kg)	Jun 6, 2017
Joe Sparacio; LB	Recruit ratings: Scout: Rivals: 247Sports: ESPN:				
David Bailey; RB	Ridgely, Maryland	North Caroline High School	6 ft 1 in (1.85 m)	235 lb (107 kg)	Jun 6, 2017
David Bailey; RB	Recruit ratings: Scout: Rivals: 247Sports: ESPN:				
Aaron Gethers; CB	Harrisburg, Pennsylvania	Bishop McDevitt High School	5 ft 11 in (1.80 m)	185 lb (84 kg)	Jun 9, 2017
Aaron Gethers; CB	Recruit ratings: Scout: Rivals: 247Sports: ESPN:				
Tyler Days; DB	Mattydale, New York	Cicero – North Syracuse High School	6 ft 1 in (1.85 m)	185 lb (84 kg)	Jun 11, 2017
Tyler Days; DB	Recruit ratings: Scout: Rivals: 247Sports: ESPN:				
Elijah Jones; DB	East Harlem, New York	Cardinal Hayes High School	6 ft 3 in (1.91 m)	175 lb (79 kg)	Jun 16, 2017
Elijah Jones; DB	Recruit ratings: Scout: Rivals: 247Sports: ESPN:				
Thomas Shelmire; OG	Dallas, Texas	Highland Park High School	6 ft 3 in (1.91 m)	285 lb (129 kg)	Jun 17, 2017
Thomas Shelmire; OG	Recruit ratings: Scout: Rivals: 247Sports: ESPN:				
Nick DeNucci; LB	Sparta, New Jersey	Pope John XXIII Regional High School	6 ft 1 in (1.85 m)	230 lb (100 kg)	Jun 18, 2017
Nick DeNucci; LB	Recruit ratings: Scout: Rivals: 247Sports: ESPN:				
Jason Maitre; WR	Everett, Massachusetts	Everett High School	5 ft 9 in (1.75 m)	160 lb (73 kg)	Jun 19, 2017
Jason Maitre; WR	Recruit ratings: Scout: Rivals: 247Sports: ESPN:				
Tyler Vrabel; OT	Bellaire, Texas	St. Pius X High School	6 ft 4 in (1.93 m)	255 lb (116 kg)	Jun 26, 2017
Tyler Vrabel; OT	Recruit ratings: Scout: Rivals: 247Sports: ESPN:				
Overall recruit ranking:
Note: In many cases, Scout, Rivals, 247Sports, On3, and ESPN may conflict in their listings of height and weight.; In these cases, the average was taken. ESPN grades are on a 100-point scale.; Sources: "2018 Team Ranking". Rivals.com.

== Preseason ==
=== Award watch lists ===
Listed in the order that they were released

Award	Player	Position	Year
Lott Trophy	Zach Allen	DE	SR
Chuck Bednarik Award	Zach Allen	DE	SR
Chuck Bednarik Award	Lukas Denis	S	SR
Maxwell Award	A. J. Dillon	RB	SO
Doak Walker Award	A. J. Dillon	RB	SO
John Mackey Award	Tommy Sweeney	TE	JR
Jim Thorpe Award	Lukas Denis	DB	SR
Bronko Nagurski Trophy	Zach Allen	DE	SR
Bronko Nagurski Trophy	Lukas Denis	DB	SR
Outland Trophy	Chris Lindstrom	OL	SR
Paul Hornung Award	Michael Walker	WR/KR	SR
Wuerffel Trophy	Zach Allen	DE	SR
Walter Camp Award	A. J. Dillon	RB	SO
Ted Hendricks Award	Zach Allen	DE	SR

=== ACC media poll ===
The ACC media poll was released on July 24, 2018.

Media poll (Atlantic)
Predicted finish	Team	Votes (1st place)
1	Clemson	1,031 (145)
2	Florida State	789 (1)
3	NC State	712 (2)
4	Boston College	545
5	Louisville	422
6	Wake Forest	413
7	Syracuse	232

== Schedule ==
Date	Time	Opponent	Rank	Site	TV	Result	Attendance
September 1	1:00 p.m.	UMass*		Alumni Stadium; Chestnut Hill, MA (rivalry)	ESPN app	W 55–21	30,112
September 8	1:00 p.m.	Holy Cross*		Alumni Stadium; Chestnut Hill, MA (rivalry)	ESPN app	W 62–14	40,311
September 13	5:30 p.m. (Note: The Wake Forest game was originally scheduled for 7:30 p.m., but the game was moved up to 5:30 p.m. in anticipation of Hurricane Florence.)	at Wake Forest		BB&T Field; Winston-Salem, NC	ESPN	W 41–34	25,309
September 22	12:00 p.m.	at Purdue*	No. 23	Ross–Ade Stadium; West Lafayette, IN	ESPN2	L 13–30	47,119
September 29	12:00 p.m.	Temple*		Alumni Stadium; Chestnut Hill, MA	ESPNU	W 45–35	40,111
October 6	12:30 p.m.	at No. 23 NC State		Carter–Finley Stadium; Raleigh, NC	NESN	L 23–28	57,241
October 13	12:30 p.m.	Louisville^{†}		Alumni Stadium; Chestnut Hill, MA	NESN	W 38–20	31,478
October 26	7:00 p.m.	Miami (FL)		Alumni Stadium; Chestnut Hill, MA	ESPN	W 27–14	41,892
November 3	3:45 p.m.	at Virginia Tech	No. 22	Lane Stadium; Blacksburg, VA (rivalry)	ACCN	W 31–21	65,632
November 10	8:00 p.m.	No. 2 Clemson	No. 17	Alumni Stadium; Chestnut Hill, MA (O'Rourke–McFadden Trophy, College GameDay)	ABC	L 7–27	44,500
November 17	3:30 p.m.	at Florida State	No. 20	Doak Campbell Stadium; Tallahassee, FL	ESPN2	L 21–22	57,274
November 24	12:00 p.m.	No. 20 Syracuse		Alumni Stadium; Chestnut Hill, MA	ESPN	L 21–42	34,959
December 26	1:30 p.m.	vs. No. 25 Boise State*		Cotton Bowl Stadium; Dallas, TX (First Responder Bowl)	ESPN	NC 7–0 (Note: The First Responder Bowl was cancelled due to inclement weather. Boston College was leading.)	
*Non-conference game; ^{†}Homecoming; Rankings from AP Poll and CFP Rankings after October 30 released prior to game; All times are in Eastern time

== Game summaries ==
=== UMass ===
	1	2	3	4	Total
Minutemen	7	0	0	14	21
Eagles	14	34	0	7	55

In the Battle of the Bay State, BC used their RB A. J. Dillon early and often and cruised to an opening day victory

=== Holy Cross ===
	1	2	3	4	Total
Crusaders	0	0	7	7	14
Eagles	21	13	14	14	62

QB Anthony Brown continued his stellar start to the season and led BC to an easy win over FCS Holy Cross

=== At Wake Forest ===
	1	2	3	4	Total
Eagles	7	14	7	13	41
Demon Deacons	7	14	3	10	34

In a redemption game from last season, Anthony Brown threw for a career high 5 touchdowns in BC's ACC opening win over Wake Forest. BC would get into the AP Poll at No. 23 the next day

=== At Purdue ===
	1	2	3	4	Total
No. 23 Eagles	7	0	0	6	13
Boilermakers	7	16	7	0	30

In their first game as a ranked team since 2009, the Eagles excitement got the better of them as they lost for the first time this season to winless Purdue. It knocked BC out of the rankings

=== Temple ===
	1	2	3	4	Total
Owls	14	7	7	7	35
Eagles	13	18	7	7	45

A. J. Dillon led his team to a bounce back win over Temple with two touchdowns as the Eagles stayed undefeated at Alumni Stadium in 2018

=== At NC State ===
	1	2	3	4	Total
Eagles	3	0	7	13	23
No. 23 Wolfpack	7	14	7	0	28

Despite causing turnovers in Raleigh, the Eagles offense could not answer without Dillon and lost their first ACC game of 2018 to the Wolfpack

=== Louisville ===
	1	2	3	4	Total
Cardinals	13	7	0	0	20
Eagles	14	10	0	14	38

In a must win ACC game, BC would jump out to an early 14–0 lead. Sloppy play and miscues allowed Louisville to take a 20–14 lead in the half. But BC used a blocked punt TD to retake the lead and would score the final 24 points of the game to defeat the Cardinals and get to the off week with a 5–2 record

=== Miami (FL) ===
	1	2	3	4	Total
Hurricanes	7	7	0	0	14
Eagles	14	3	10	0	27

In the 5th edition of the Red Bandanna Game, A. J. Dillon returned to give the Eagles and their wild crowd their best victory over the season over the #25 Hurricanes. Anthony Brown also had two TDs (1 Pass 1 Rush) and BC's defense caused two interceptions in the second half that led to 10 points

=== At Virginia Tech ===
	1	2	3	4	Total
No. 24 Eagles	7	0	14	10	31
Hokies	7	7	0	7	21

The Eagles visited Virginia Tech and pulled out a 31–21 victory. Sophomore Travis Levy gave BC a boost with two rushing TDs in the second half after falling behind 14–7. A. J. Dillon left the game with an injury

=== Clemson ===
	1	2	3	4	Total
No. 2 Tigers	10	3	7	7	27
No. 17 Eagles	7	0	0	0	7

In what was deemed the biggest game of the year for the Boston College Eagles, the defense played a role in holding Clemson to a 13–7 lead at halftime. But without Anthony Brown, who was injured on BC's first possession of the game, the Eagles could not muster enough offense and dropped a tough matchup to the second ranked Tigers

=== At Florida State ===
	1	2	3	4	Total
No. 20 Eagles	0	7	7	7	21
Seminoles	0	6	7	9	22

The Eagles were big favorites even after a tough loss last week. But with both Brown and Dillon not one hundred percent, the Eagles offense struggled and the Seminoles picked up a late TD pass in the final two minutes of regulation to get an upset

=== Syracuse ===
	1	2	3	4	Total
No. 19 Orange	14	14	7	7	42
Eagles	7	7	7	0	21

Eric Dungey was in full form even after getting injured against Notre Dame the week before and the Eagles could not stop him or the Orange offense in another lackluster game for the Eagles. Brown accounted for all of BC's touchdowns but Dillon was still banged up and BC finished the regular season 7–5 for the third straight year

=== Vs. Boise State (first responder bowl) ===
	1	2	3	4	Total
Eagles	7				7
No. 23 Broncos	0				0

With Boston College leading 7–0 with 5:08 remaining in the 1st quarter, the game was delayed due to inclement weather. After an hour and a half delay, the game was canceled and ruled a no contest

A. J. Dillon scored on the Eagles' first possession; a 19-yard touchdown run. He had 33 yards on six carries. Anthony Brown was 4-for-6 passing for 54 yards, while Kobay White made two catches for 35 yards.

== Rankings ==
Ranking movements Legend: ██ Increase in ranking ██ Decrease in ranking — = Not ranked RV = Received votes
	Week															
Poll	Pre	1	2	3	4	5	6	7	8	9	10	11	12	13	14	Final
AP	RV	RV	RV	23	—	RV	—	—	RV	24	17	22	—	—	—	
Coaches	RV	RV	RV	25	RV	RV	—	RV	—	25	14	22	RV	—	—	
CFP	Not released									22	17	20	—	—	—	Not released

== Roster ==
2018 Boston College Eagles football team roster
Players
Coaches
Offense

Pos.	#	Name	Class
WR	1	Elijah Robinson	Sr
RB	2	A. J. Dillon	So
WR	3	Michael Walker	Sr
QB	4	E. J. Perry	So
WR	6	Jeff Smith	Sr
QB	7	Matt Valecce	Fr
WR	9	Kobay White	So
QB	10	Matt McDonald	Fr
WR	11	C. J. Lewis	So
QB	13	Anthony Brown	So
RB	15	John Fadule	Sr
WR	17	Aidan Hegarty	So
WR, RB	19	Ben Glines	Jr
QB	20	Dennis Grosel	Fr
QB	21	Johnny Langan	Fr
RB	23	Travis Levy	So
RB	38	Peter Stehr	Fr
RB	39	Andrew Strader	Jr
TE	41	Joey Luchetti	Fr
RB	42	Javian Dayne	Fr
TE	43	Tito Pasqualoni	Fr
TE	44	Brenden Smith	Fr
FB	47	Colton Cardinal	Sr
OL	52	Cam Reddy	Fr
OL	55	Wyatt Knopfke	Jr
OL	56	Adam Korutz	So
OL	64	Ben Petrula	So
OL	65	Thomas Shelmire	Fr
OL	66	Anthony Palazzolo	Jr
OL	67	Aaron Monteiro	Sr
OL	69	Eddy Fish	So
OL	70	John Phillips	Jr
OL	71	Nate Emer	Fr
OL	72	Alec Lindstrom	Fr
OL	73	Sam Schmal	Sr
OL	74	Finn Dirstine	Fr
OL	75	Chris Lindstrom	Sr
OL	76	Elijah Johnson	So
OL	77	John Baker	Sr
OL	78	Tyler Vrabel	Fr
OL	79	Sean Ragan	So
TE	80	Hunter Long	Fr
TE	81	Chris Garrison	Jr
WR	83	Jehlani Galloway	Fr
TE	84	Jake Burt	Jr
TE	85	Korab Idrizi	Jr
TE	86	Ray Marten	Jr
WR	87	Noah Jordan-Williams	Fr
TE	88	Patrick Brown	Fr
TE	89	Tommy Sweeney	Sr

Defense

Pos.	#	Name	Class
DE	2	Zach Allen	Sr
DB	4	Hamp Cheevers	Jr
DB	5	Nolan Borgersen	Jr
DB	7	Tate Haynes	Fr
DB	8	Will Harris	Sr
DB	10	Brandon Sebastian	Fr
DE	11	Wyatt Ray	Sr
LB	13	Connor Strachan	Sr
LB	14	Max Richardson	So
LB	16	Davon Jones	Jr
DB	18	Mike Palmer	So
DB	20	Elijah Jones	Fr
DB	21	Lukas Denis	Sr
DB	24	Taj-Amir Torres	Sr
DB	25	Mehdi El Attrach	Jr
LB	28	John Lamot	So
DB	29	Tyler Days	Fr
DB	30	Jahmin Muse	Fr
LB	32	Nick DeNucci	Fr
LB	33	Curt Bletzer	So
LB	34	Joseph Sparacio	Fr
DB	35	Aaron Gethers	Fr
LB	36	Paul Theobald Jr.	Fr
DB	37	Ezechiel Tieide	Fr
DB	38	Jason Maitre	Fr
LB	41	Thomas Hovsepian	Fr
LB	43	Isaiah Miranda	So
DL	44	Brandon Barlow	So
DB	45	Ben Stewart	Fr
LB	46	Jimmy Martin	Jr
DL	48	Tanner Karafa	Jr
LB	49	Kevin Bletzer	Sr
LB	50	Doug Rodier	So
LB	51	Hugh Davis	Fr
LB	54	Evan Stewart	Fr
LB	55	Isaiah McDuffie	So
LB	57	Ryan Whittelsey	Fr
LB	58	Reggie Terry Jr.	Fr
DL	90	Bryce Morais	So
DT	91	Jaleel Berry	Fr
DE	93	Drew McQuarrie	Fr
DT	94	Ryan Betro	Fr
DL	95	Taylor Hill	So
DT	96	Ray Smith	Sr
DE	97	Marcus Valdez	Fr
DT	98	Kyiey Bennermon	Fr
DT	99	T. J. Rayam	So

Special teams

Pos.	#	Name	Class
P	34	Garrett Reilly	Fr
K	37	Danny Longman	Fr
P	95	Grant Carlson	So
K, P	98	John Tessitore	Fr
K	99	Colton Lichtenberg	Sr

Head coach

- Steve Addazio

Coordinators/assistant coaches

- Scot Loeffler (offensive coordinator / quarterbacks)
- Frank Leonard (assistant head coach / tight ends)
- Brian White (running backs)
- Rich Gunnell (wide receivers)
- Phil Trautwein (offensive line)
- Jim Reid (defensive ends)
- Anthony Campanile (co-defensive coordinator / defensive backs)
- Ricky Brown (SAM linebackers)
- Antoine Smith (defensive tackles)
- Bill Sheridan (linebackers)
- Frank Piraino (head strength & conditioning coach)

Legend

- (C) Team captain
- (S) Suspended
- (I) Ineligible
- Injured
- Redshirt

Roster

== 2019 NFL draft ==
Player	Team	Round	Pick #	Position
Chris Lindstrom	Atlanta Falcons	1st	14	G
Zach Allen	Arizona Cardinals	3rd	65	DE
Will Harris	Detroit Lions	3rd	81st	S
Tommy Sweeney	Buffalo Bills	7th	228th	TE
