= Zach Kerr =

American football player (born 1990)

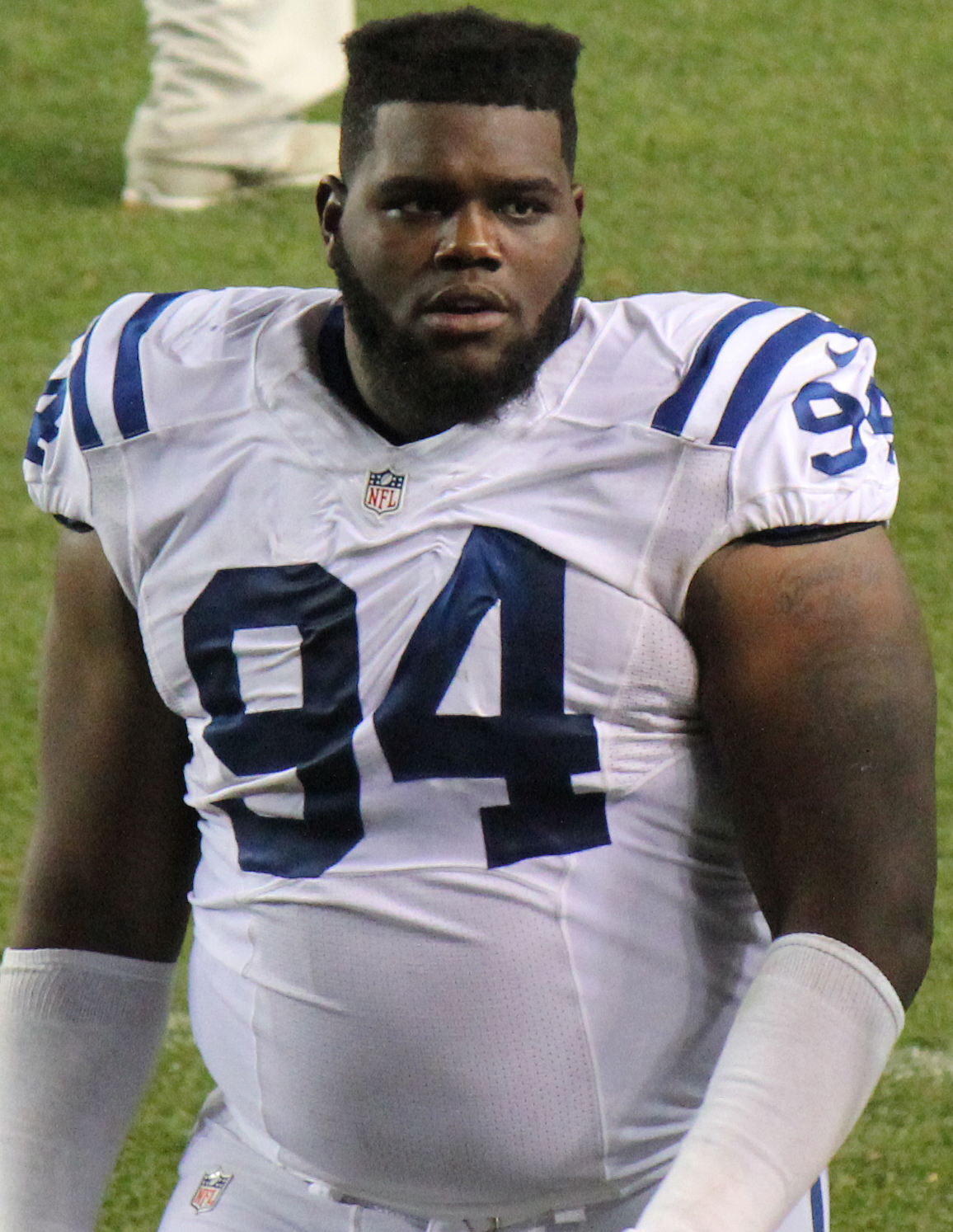
- Kerr with the Indianapolis Colts in 2014

No. 94, 92, 69
- Position: Defensive end

Personal information
- Born: August 29, 1990 (age 36); Virginia Beach, Virginia, U.S.
- Listed height: 6 ft 2 in (1.88 m)
- Listed weight: 334 lb (151 kg)

Career information
- High school: Quince Orchard (Gaithersburg, Maryland)
- College: Delaware
- NFL draft: 2014: undrafted

Career history
- Indianapolis Colts (2014–2016); Denver Broncos (2017–2018); Arizona Cardinals (2019); Carolina Panthers (2020); San Francisco 49ers (2021); Arizona Cardinals (2021); Cincinnati Bengals (2021)

Awards and highlights
- Second-team All-CAA (2012)

Career NFL statistics
- Total tackles: 173
- Sacks: 9.5
- Forced fumbles: 2
- Fumble recoveries: 1
- Stats at Pro Football Reference

Zachariah Winston Kerr (born August 29, 1990) is an American former professional football player who was a defensive end in the National Football League (NFL). He played college football for the Delaware Fightin' Blue Hens and signed with the NFL's Indianapolis Colts as an undrafted free agent in 2014. He also played for the Denver Broncos, Arizona Cardinals, Carolina Panthers, San Francisco 49ers and Cincinnati Bengals.

== Professional career ==
=== Indianapolis Colts ===
Kerr went undrafted in 2014, and signed with the Indianapolis Colts as an undrafted free agent. He played in all four pre-season games that year, recording 14 tackles and 1 sack. Kerr made his regular season debut in Week 1 against the Denver Broncos, recording 1 tackle. During his rookie season in 2014, Kerr played 12 games with 16 tackles, 1 pass defended, and 3 sacks. In 2015, he played 12 games with 29 tackles. In 2016, he played 12 games with 19 tackles, 2.5 sacks, and a fumble recovery.

=== Denver Broncos ===
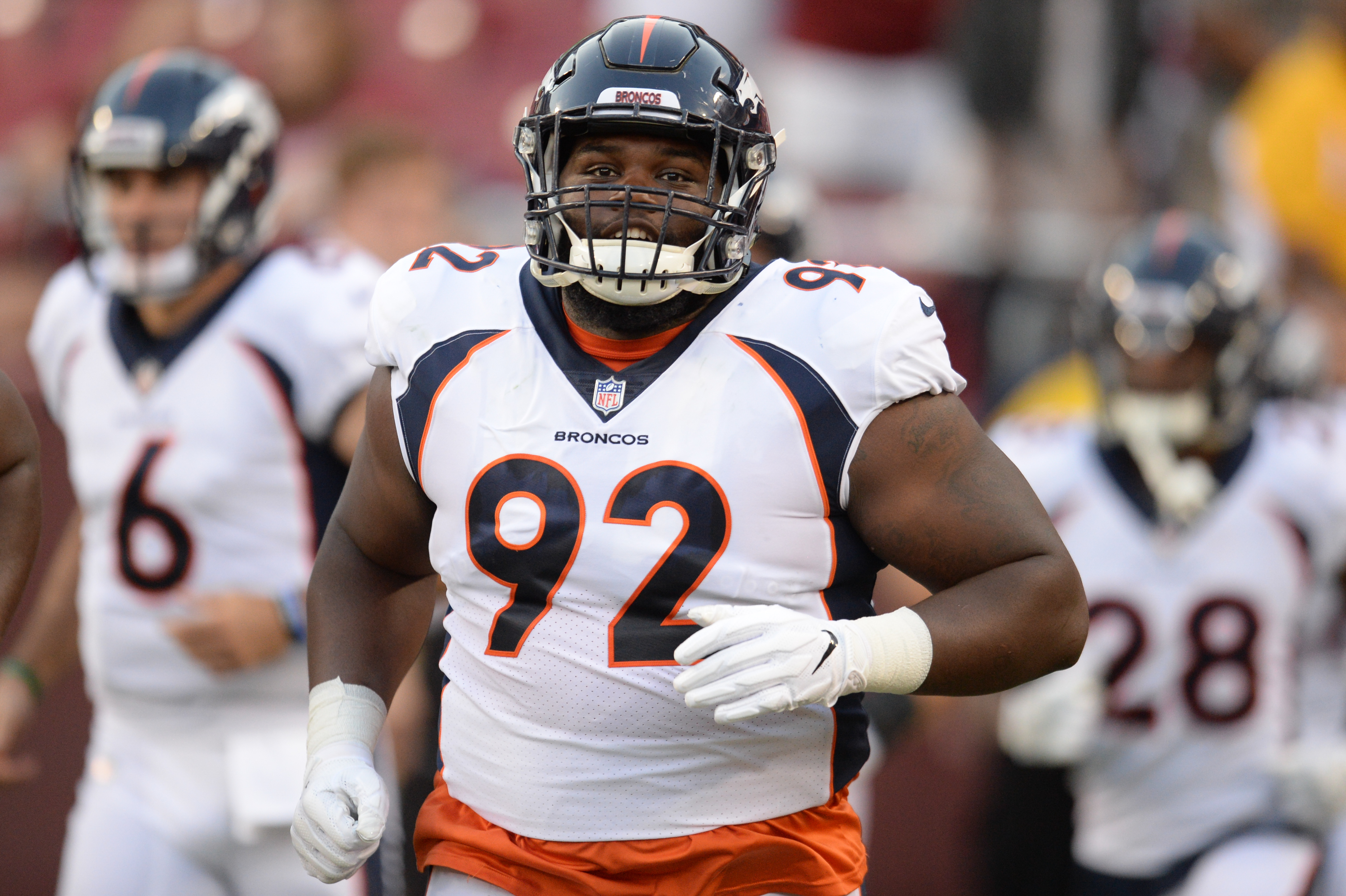
Kerr with the Denver Broncos in 2018

On March 11, 2017, Kerr signed a two-year deal with the Denver Broncos. In 11 games of 2017, Kerr finished the year with 19 tackles, half a sack, and one pass defended.

In 2018, Kerr played in all 16 games, recording 33 combined tackles and 1.5 sacks.

On March 16, 2019, Kerr signed a two-year contract extension with the Broncos. He was released on August 26, 2019.

=== Arizona Cardinals (first stint) ===
On October 2, 2019, Kerr signed with the Arizona Cardinals.

=== Carolina Panthers ===
Kerr signed a two-year contract with the Carolina Panthers on March 25, 2020. He was placed on the reserve/COVID-19 list by the team on December 7, 2020, and activated on December 22. He was released after the season on March 16, 2021.

=== San Francisco 49ers ===
Kerr signed a one-year contract with the San Francisco 49ers on March 23, 2021. He played in four games before being released on November 6, 2021.

=== Arizona Cardinals (second stint) ===
On November 9, 2021, Kerr signed with the Arizona Cardinals. He was waived on January 10, 2022 and re-signed to the practice squad.

=== Cincinnati Bengals ===
On January 19, 2022, the Cincinnati Bengals signed Kerr off the Cardinals practice squad. He played in three playoff games for the Bengals, including Super Bowl LVI where played 15 snaps on defense and four snaps on special teams in a 23–20 loss to the Los Angeles Rams.

== NFL career statistics ==
Legend
**Bold**	Career high

=== Regular season ===
Year	Team	Games		Tackles					Interceptions					Fumbles			
Year	Team	GP	GS	Cmb	Solo	Ast	Sck	TFL	Int	Yds	TD	Lng	PD	FF	FR	Yds	TD
2014	IND	12	0	16	11	5	**3.0**	2	0	0	0	0	1	**1**	0	0	0
2015	IND	12	**4**	29	**16**	13	0.0	2	0	0	0	0	1	0	0	0	0
2016	IND	12	**4**	19	11	8	2.5	**4**	0	0	0	0	0	0	**1**	0	0
2017	DEN	11	1	19	10	9	0.5	2	0	0	0	0	1	0	0	0	0
2018	DEN	**16**	0	**33**	15	18	1.5	2	0	0	0	0	1	0	0	0	0
2019	ARI	12	3	19	13	6	0.0	1	0	0	0	0	1	0	0	0	0
2020	CAR	13	**4**	32	11	**21**	2.0	2	0	0	0	0	**2**	**1**	0	0	0
2021	SFO	4	0	3	1	2	0.0	0	0	0	0	0	0	0	0	0	0
2021	ARI	3	0	3	1	2	0.0	0	0	0	0	0	0	0	0	0	0
Total		95	16	173	89	84	9.5	15	0	0	0	0	7	2	1	0	0

=== Playoffs ===
Year	Team	Games		Tackles					Interceptions					Fumbles			
Year	Team	GP	GS	Cmb	Solo	Ast	Sck	TFL	Int	Yds	TD	Lng	PD	FF	FR	Yds	TD
2021	CIN	**3**	0	**1**	**1**	0	0.0	0	0	0	0	0	0	0	0	0	0
Total		3	0	1	1	0	0.0	0	0	0	0	0	0	0	0	0	0
