= Tyler Vrabel =

American football player (born 2000)

No. 73
- Position: Offensive tackle

Personal information
- Born: June 24, 2000 (age 26); Bellaire, Texas, U.S.
- Listed height: 6 ft 6 in (1.98 m)
- Listed weight: 319 lb (145 kg)

Career information
- High school: St. Pius X (Houston, Texas)
- College: Boston College (2018–2021)
- NFL draft: 2022: undrafted

Career history
- Atlanta Falcons (2022–2023)

Career NFL statistics
- Games played: 2
- Stats at Pro Football Reference

Tyler Vrabel (born June 24, 2000) is an American former professional football player who was an offensive tackle for the Atlanta Falcons of the National Football League (NFL). He played college football for the Boston College Eagles.

== College career ==
In Vrabel's collegiate career, he started in 33 of the 35 games he played, allowed seven sacks and was flagged for 11 penalties. Vrabel was also named honorable mention all-Atlantic Coast Conference in three seasons.

== Professional career ==
Pre-draft measurables
| Height | Weight | Arm length | Hand span | 40-yard dash | 10-yard split | 20-yard split | 20-yard shuttle | Three-cone drill | Vertical jump | Broad jump | Bench press |
|---|---|---|---|---|---|---|---|---|---|---|---|
| 6 ft 5 3/4 in (1.97 m) | 315 lb (143 kg) | 32 3/8 in (0.82 m) | 9 3/4 in (0.25 m) | 5.40 s | 1.81 s | 3.15 s | 4.61 s | 7.47 s | 28.5 in (0.72 m) | 9 ft 2 in (2.79 m) | 25 reps |
All values from Pro Day

After not being selected in the 2022 NFL draft, Vrabel signed with the Atlanta Falcons as an undrafted free agent. Vrabel was cut on August 30, 2022, during final roster cuts, however, he was signed to the practice squad a day later. On January 9, 2023, Vrabel signed a reserve/futures contract with the Falcons.

Vrabel was cut during the 2023 final roster cuts by the Falcons, but was signed to the team's practice squad a day later. On December 9, 2023, Vrabel was elevated to the active roster ahead of the team's Week 14 matchup. On December 10, Vrabel made his NFL debut against the Tampa Bay Buccaneers where he played 61 total snaps. Following the end of the 2023 regular season, he signed a reserve/future contract with Atlanta on January 10, 2024.

On July 30, 2024, Vrabel was placed on the reserve/retired list by the Falcons.

== Personal life ==
Vrabel is the son of former linebacker and New England Patriots head coach Mike Vrabel.

On June 27, 2026, Vrabel was arrested in Brentwood, Tennessee due to reckless driving after traveling 71 mph (114 km/h) in a 45 mph (72 km/h) zone.
