= Don Shumpert =

American football player and coach (born 1992)

Profile
- Position: Assistant Running Backs

Personal information
- Born: January 8, 1992 (age 34); St. Louis, Missouri, U.S.
- Listed height: 6 ft 3 in (1.91 m)
- Listed weight: 200 lb (91 kg)

Career information
- College: Iowa
- NFL draft: 2014: undrafted

Career history

Playing
- Kansas City Chiefs (2014)*; Chicago Bears (2014)*
- * Offseason or practice squad member only

Coaching
- Iowa (2016–2017) Graduate assistant; New York Giants (2018) Offensive Assistant; Arizona Cardinals (2019) Bill Bidwill Coaching Fellowship/Assistant Running Backs; Arizona Cardinals (2020–2021) Offensive Assistant

Don Shumpert (born January 8, 1992) is an American football coach who is currently the Bill Bidwill Coaching Fellowship recipient and assistant running backs coach for the Arizona Cardinals of the National Football League (NFL). Shumpert played wide receiver at Iowa.

== Early life ==
Don Shumpert, a St. Louis native, attended Hazelwood East High School, where he was a two-year letterman, playing both wide receiver and defensive back. In his junior season, Hazelwood won the state title. As a senior, Shumpert served as team captain and earned both team MVP and first team all-state honors. Shumpert also achieved all-state honors as a track athlete and was a two-year letterman in basketball.

== Playing career ==
Shumpert was a three-year letterman as a wide receiver for the Iowa Hawkeyes playing from 2010 to 2013. In his career for the Hawkeyes, Shumpert totaled 21 receptions for 211 yards, while also contributing on special teams, collecting 11 career tackles. Shumpert's best season came his senior season when he recorded 15 receptions for 182 yards. That season, the Hawkeyes posted an 8–5 record and earned an invitation to the 2014 Outback Bowl. Shumpert received the Next Man In Award for offense as a senior. Additionally, he received Academic All-Big Ten honors in both 2012 and 2013.

Following his playing career at Iowa, Shumpert was invited to the Chicago Bears Rookie minicamp and the Kansas City Chiefs minicamp in 2014.

== Coaching career ==
=== Iowa ===
Shumpert's coaching career started at his alma mater Iowa, where he spent two seasons as a graduate assistant (2016–2017) working with wide receivers and special teams.

=== New York Giants ===
Shumpert spent the 2018 NFL season as an offensive assistant wide receivers for the New York Giants.

=== Arizona Cardinals ===
On February 12, 2019, the Arizona Cardinals announced that Don Shumpert was the recipient of the Bill Bidwill Coaching Fellowship. He will also be the assistant running backs coach.
