= Peter Badovinac =

American football coach (born 1989)

Personal information
- Born: October 6, 1989 (age 37); Hoffman Estates, Illinois, U.S.

Career information
- College: Michigan State

Career history
- Missouri (2013–2014) Graduate assistant; Missouri State (2015–2017) Linebackers coach & recruiting coordinator; Ohio State (2018) Graduate assistant; Arizona Cardinals (2019) Assistant wide receivers coach; Baylor (2020) Offensive assistant

Peter Badovinac (born October 6, 1989) is an American football coach who is currently an offensive assistant at Baylor University.

== Early life ==
Badovinac played high school football at Loyola Academy where he was coached by former NFL linebacker, John Holecek. In 2007 he was selected Chicago Catholic League Offensive Player of the Year. He started his collegiate career in 2008 at Drake, where he redshirted and then played one season prior to transferring to Michigan State. He then played for the Spartans from 2010 to 2012. During his time at MSU, the Spartans won the 2010 Big Ten Championship, played in the inaugural Big Ten Championship Game in 2011, and won two bowl games.

== Coaching career ==
=== Missouri ===
Following his playing career, Badovinac worked for two years at Missouri, where he helped the Tigers to a 22-5 record and back-to-back SEC East titles. Badovinac began his career in coaching as a recruiting graduate assistant at Missouri prior to serving as a defensive graduate assistant for the 2013 and 2014 seasons.

=== Missouri State ===
Badovinac worked for three years (2015–17) as the linebackers coach and recruiting coordinator at Missouri State. During his time with the Bears, Badovinac mentored 2016 consensus All-American and current Houston Texans Dylan Cole, who was a finalist for the Buck Buchanan Award after leading the nation in tackles per game.

=== Ohio State ===
On March 9, 2018, Badovinac was hired as a defensive graduate assistant at Ohio State. The Buckeyes won the Big Ten Conference and the Rose Bowl.

=== Oklahoma ===
In January 2019, Badovinac was hired as a defensive graduate assistant at Oklahoma, a position he held briefly before leaving to join the Arizona Cardinals.

=== Arizona Cardinals ===
On February 6, 2019, Badovinac was hired by the Arizona Cardinals to be their assistant wide receivers coach.

=== Baylor University ===
Badovinac is currently an offensive assistant at Baylor University.
