= 2022 Tampa Bay Buccaneers season =

47th season in franchise history

- Owner: The Glazer family
- General manager: Jason Licht
- Head coach: Todd Bowles
- Offensive coordinator: Byron Leftwich
- Home stadium: Raymond James Stadium

Results
- Record: 8–9
- Division place: 1st NFC South
- Playoffs: Lost Wild Card Playoffs (vs. Cowboys) 14–31
- All-Pros: OT Tristan Wirfs (2nd team)
- Pro Bowlers: OT Tristan Wirfs

Uniform
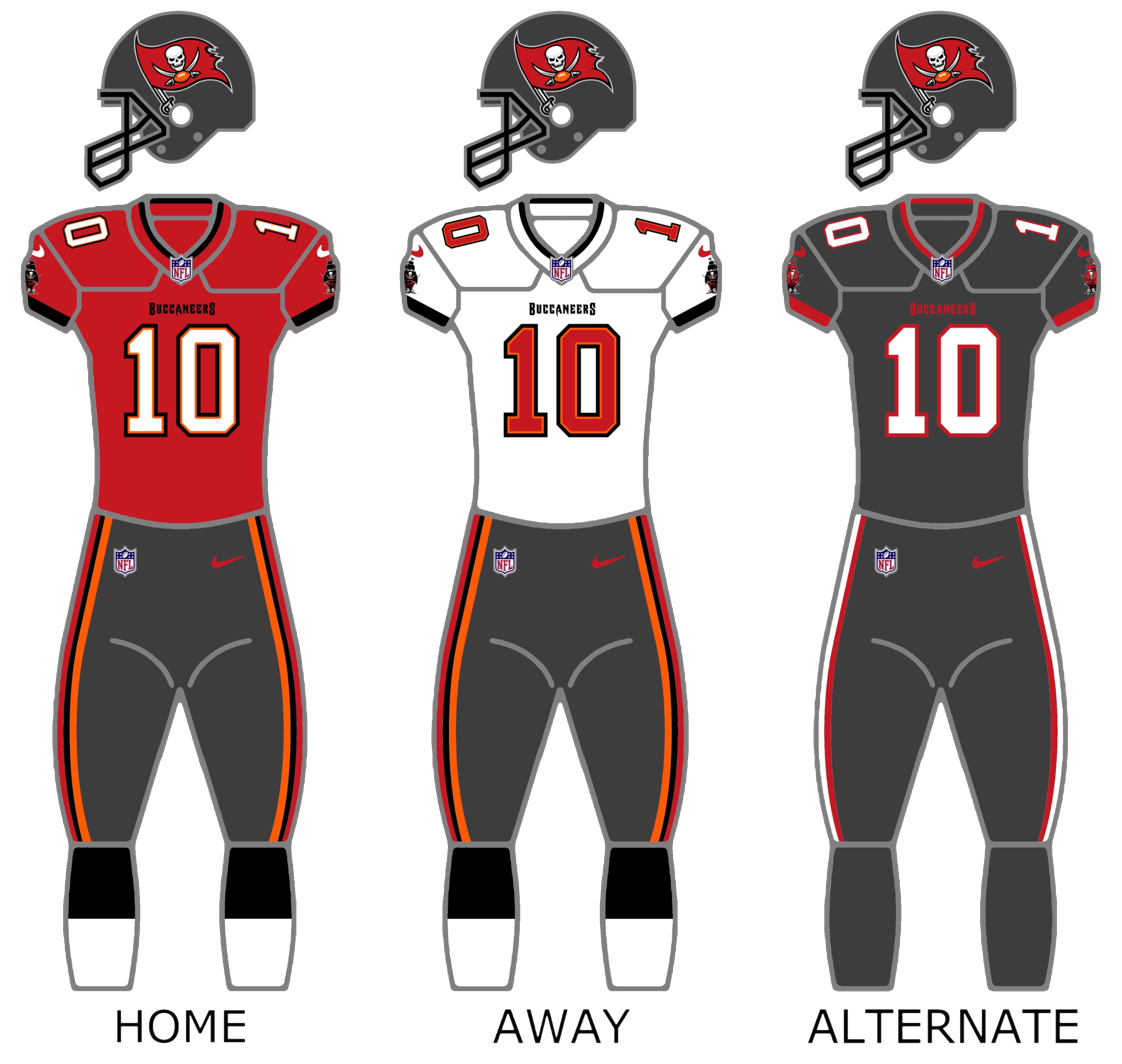

The 2022 season was the Tampa Bay Buccaneers' 47th in the National Football League (NFL), their first under first-year head coach Todd Bowles, and ninth under general manager Jason Licht. Bowles was elevated from the defensive coordinator position, which he held from 2019 to 2021. Tampa Bay won the NFC South, the first time in franchise history the Buccaneers won division titles in consecutive seasons.

On February 1, 2022, quarterback Tom Brady announced his retirement from the league. Brady had one season remaining on his contract with the Buccaneers. However, on March 13, after only forty days, he reversed his decision, and announced he would return for the 2022 season. Brady's announcement triggered a flurry of free agent signings, re-signings, and restructuring, including Chris Godwin, Leonard Fournette, Shaq Mason, Russell Gage, Carlton Davis, Ryan Jensen, Julio Jones and others. Jensen, however, would be placed on IR due to a knee injury during training camp.

On March 30, a couple weeks after Brady's announcement, head coach Bruce Arians announced his second retirement from coaching and shifted to Senior Football Consultant. Defensive coordinator and former Jets head coach Todd Bowles was immediately named the successor to Arians. After two seasons with the club, Rob Gronkowski announced his second retirement on June 21.

The Buccaneers entered the 2022 season as defending NFC South champions and attempted to win their division in consecutive seasons for the first time in franchise history. They also looked to achieve a playoff berth for the third consecutive season. After starting the season 2–0, the Buccaneers lost five out of their next six games, failing to improve upon their franchise-best 13–4 record from the previous season after a Week 8 loss to the Baltimore Ravens. After a Week 15 loss to Cincinnati, quarterback Tom Brady posted his first eight-loss season as a starter. However, the Buccaneers clinched the NFC South title for the second consecutive season and a playoff berth for the third consecutive season after a Week 17 win over Carolina. The second half of the season, in particular, was highlighted by dramatic last-second victories against the Rams and Saints, an overtime victory at Arizona on Christmas, and an NFL International Series victory against Seattle.

Tampa Bay entered the playoffs as the fourth seed in the NFC and hosted the Dallas Cowboys, but lost 31−14. After a loss to the Atlanta Falcons in Week 18, Tampa Bay became the fourth team in NFL history to make the playoffs with a losing record in a full season, following the 2010 Seahawks, the 2014 Panthers, and the 2020 Washington Football Team. It would be followed by the 2025 Carolina Panthers. This marked the only losing season for Tom Brady in his career as a starter. Following a Week 8 loss to the Ravens, it also became the first time Brady lost three consecutive games since the 2002 New England Patriots season.

The 2022 season was to be the 34th and final year for longtime Buccaneers Radio Network announcer Gene Deckerhoff; however, he reversed his decision during the offseason. On February 1, 2023, one year exactly after his initial retirement, quarterback Tom Brady announced that he was retiring from the league, "for good".

The Buccaneers attempted an NFL-record 751 passes during the 2022 season.

== Draft ==
2022 Tampa Bay Buccaneers draft
Round	Selection	Player	Position	College	Notes
1	27	Traded to Jacksonville (Note: The Buccaneers traded a first-round selection (27th overall) to the Jacksonville Jaguars in exchange for second-, fourth- and sixth-round selections (33rd, 106th and 180th overall).)			
2	33	Logan Hall	DT	Houston	From Jacksonville
2	57	Luke Goedeke	OT	Central Michigan	From Buffalo (Note: The Buccaneers traded second- and sixth-round selections (60th and 180th overall) to the Buffalo Bills in exchange for a second-round selection (57th overall) .)
2	60	Traded to Buffalo			
3	91	Rachaad White	RB	Arizona State	
4	106	Cade Otton	TE	Washington	From Jacksonville
4	133	Jake Camarda	P	Georgia	
5	157	Zyon McCollum	CB	Sam Houston State	From Minnesota via Jacksonville (Note: The Buccaneers traded a 2023 fourth-round pick to the Jacksonville Jaguars in exchange for fifth- and seventh-round selections (157th and 235th overall).)
5	170	Traded to New England (Note: The Buccaneers traded a fifth-round selection (170th overall) to the New England Patriots in exchange for G Shaq Mason.)			
6	180	Traded to Buffalo			From Jacksonville
6	206	Traded to the New York Jets (Note: The Buccaneers traded a sixth-round selection (206th overall) to the New York Jets in exchange for NT Steve McLendon and a 2023 seventh-round selection.)			
6	218	Ko Kieft	TE	Minnesota	Compensatory pick; from LA Rams (Note: The Buccaneers traded two seventh-round selections (235th and 261st overall) to the Los Angeles Rams in exchange for a sixth-round selection (218th overall).)
7	235	Traded to the Los Angeles Rams			from Baltimore via Jacksonville
7	248	Andre Anthony	OLB	LSU	
7	261	Traded to the Los Angeles Rams			

Draft trades

2022 Tampa Bay Buccaneers undrafted free agents
Name	Position	College	Ref.
Ben Beise	TE	UW–River Falls	
Curtis Blackwell	G	Ball State	
Dylan Cook	OT	Montana	
Olakunle Fatukasi	MLB	Rutgers	
Don Gardner	CB	South Dakota State	
Kaylon Geiger	WR	Texas Tech	
Kyler McMichael	CB	North Carolina	
JoJo Ozougwu	OLB	Arkansas State	
J. J. Russell	MLB	Memphis	
Jerreth Sterns	WR	Western Kentucky	
Deven Thompkins	WR	Utah State	
Nolan Turner	S	Clemson	
Jordan Young	OLB	Old Dominion	

== Staff ==
2022 Tampa Bay Buccaneers staff
Front office: Co-owner/co-chairman – Bryan Glazer; Co-owner/co-chairman – Edward Glazer; Co-owner/co-chairman – Joel Glazer; Co-owner/president – Darcie Glazer Kassewitz; Co-owner – Avram Glazer; Co-owner – Kevin Glazer; General manager – Jason Licht; Vice president player personnel – John Spytek; Director of football operations – Shelton Quarles; Vice president of football administration – Mike Greenberg; Director of player personnel – Mike Biehl; Director of player personnel – Rob McCartney; Assistant director of college scouting – Byron Kiefer; Assistant director of pro scouting – Shane Scannell and Alex Smith; Vice president of player engagement – Duke Preston; Senior football consultant – Bruce Arians; Head coaches: Head coach – Todd Bowles; Assistant head coach/run game coordinator – Harold Goodwin; Offensive coaches: Offensive coordinator – Byron Leftwich; Quarterbacks – Clyde Christensen; Running backs – Todd McNair; Wide receivers – Kevin Garver; Assistant wide receivers – Thaddeus Lewis; Tight ends – John Van Dam; Offensive line – Joe Gilbert; Senior offensive assistant – Rick Christophel; Offensive quality control – Jeff Kastl	Defensive coaches: Run game coordinator/defensive line coach – Kacy Rodgers; Assistant defensive line – Lori Locust; Outside linebackers – Bob Sanders; Pass game coordinator/inside linebackers coach – Larry Foote; Cornerbacks – Kevin Ross; Safeties – Nick Rapone; Assistant secondary – Tim Atkins; Defensive/special teams assistant – Keith Tandy; Defensive quality control – Joey Fitzgerald; Special teams coaches: Special teams coordinator – Keith Armstrong; Specialists – Chris Boniol; Strength and conditioning: Director of rehabilitation and performance – Maral Javadifar; Head strength and conditioning – Anthony Piroli; Assistant strength and conditioning – Cory Bichey; Assistant strength and conditioning – Chad Wade

== Final roster ==
2022 Tampa Bay Buccaneers roster
Quarterbacks (QB): 12 Tom Brady; 11 Blaine Gabbert; 2 Kyle Trask; Running backs (RB): 25 Giovani Bernard; 7 Leonard Fournette; 21 Ke'Shawn Vaughn; 29 Rachaad White; Wide receivers (WR): 13 Mike Evans; 17 Russell Gage; 14 Chris Godwin; 6 Julio Jones; 10 Scotty Miller; 16 Breshad Perriman; 83 Deven Thompkins; Tight ends (TE): 84 Cameron Brate; 41 Ko Kieft; 88 Cade Otton; 8 Kyle Rudolph	Offensive linemen (OL): 67 Luke Goedeke G; 70 Robert Hainsey C; 66 Ryan Jensen C; 60 Nick Leverett G; 75 John Molchon G; 69 Shaq Mason G; 76 Donovan Smith T; 73 Brandon Walton T; 78 Tristan Wirfs T; Defensive linemen (DL): 92 William Gholston DE; 90 Logan Hall DE; 96 Akiem Hicks DE; 56 Rakeem Nuñez-Roches NT; 79 Pat O'Connor DE; 95 Deadrin Senat NT; 50 Vita Vea NT	Linebackers (LB): 52 K. J. Britt ILB; 54 Lavonte David ILB; 57 Ulysees Gilbert ILB; 94 Carl Nassib OLB; 98 Anthony Nelson OLB; 9 Joe Tryon-Shoyinka OLB; 45 Devin White ILB; Defensive backs (DB): 24 Carlton Davis CB; 35 Jamel Dean CB; 30 Dee Delaney CB; 32 Mike Edwards SS; 27 Zyon McCollum CB; 23 Sean Murphy-Bunting CB; 22 Keanu Neal FS; 26 Logan Ryan SS; 31 Antoine Winfield Jr. FS; Special teams (ST): 5 Jake Camarda P; 3 Ryan Succop K; 97 Zach Triner LS	Practice squad: 65 Dylan Cook T; 36 Don Gardner CB; 80 Kaylon Geiger WR; 91 Mike Greene DE; 4 Ryan Griffin QB; 74 Grant Hermanns T; 18 Tyler Johnson WR; 43 Patrick Laird RB; 28 Duron Lowe CB; 44 Ifeadi Odenigbo OLB; 93 Willington Previlon DE; 46 Hamilcar Rashed Jr. OLB; 77 Justin Skule T; 48 Charles Snowden OLB; 34 Nolan Turner SS; 89 David Wells TE; Reserve: 59 Genard Avery OLB (IR); 58 Shaquil Barrett OLB (IR); 37 Anthony Chesley CB (IR); 49 Cam Gill OLB (IR); 64 Aaron Stinnie G (IR); 72 Josh Wells T (IR); Rookies in italics 53 active, 6 reserve, 16 practice squad

== Preseason ==
The Buccaneers' preseason opponents and schedule were announced on May 12, 2022.

Week	Date	Opponent	Result	Record	Venue	Recap
1	August 13	Miami Dolphins	L 24–26	0–1	Raymond James Stadium	Recap
2	August 20	at Tennessee Titans	L 3–13	0–2	Nissan Stadium	Recap
3	August 27	at Indianapolis Colts	L 10–27	0–3	Lucas Oil Stadium	Recap

== Regular season ==
=== Schedule ===
Week	Date	Opponent	Result	Record	Venue	Recap
1	September 11	at Dallas Cowboys	**W** 19–3	1–0	AT&T Stadium	Recap
2	September 18	at **New Orleans Saints**	**W** 20–10	2–0	Caesars Superdome	Recap
3	September 25	Green Bay Packers	**L** 12–14	2–1	Raymond James Stadium	Recap
4	October 2	Kansas City Chiefs	**L** 31–41	2–2	Raymond James Stadium	Recap
5	October 9	**Atlanta Falcons**	**W** 21–15	3–2	Raymond James Stadium	Recap
6	October 16	at Pittsburgh Steelers	**L** 18–20	3–3	Acrisure Stadium	Recap
7	October 23	at **Carolina Panthers**	**L** 3–21	3–4	Bank of America Stadium	Recap
8	October 27	Baltimore Ravens	**L** 22–27	3–5	Raymond James Stadium	Recap
9	November 6	Los Angeles Rams	**W** 16–13	4–5	Raymond James Stadium	Recap
10	November 13	Seattle Seahawks	**W** 21–16	5–5	(Germany) Allianz Arena (Munich)	Recap
11	Bye					
12	November 27	at Cleveland Browns	**L** 17–23 (OT)	5–6	FirstEnergy Stadium	Recap
13	December 5	**New Orleans Saints**	**W** 17–16	6–6	Raymond James Stadium	Recap
14	December 11	at San Francisco 49ers	**L** 7–35	6–7	Levi's Stadium	Recap
15	December 18	Cincinnati Bengals	**L** 23–34	6–8	Raymond James Stadium	Recap
16	December 25	at Arizona Cardinals	**W** 19–16 (OT)	7–8	State Farm Stadium	Recap
17	January 1	**Carolina Panthers**	**W** 30–24	8–8	Raymond James Stadium	Recap
18	January 8	at **Atlanta Falcons**	**L** 17–30	8–9	Mercedes-Benz Stadium	Recap

Note: Intra-division opponents are in bold text.

=== Game summaries ===
==== Week 1: at Dallas Cowboys ====
Week 1: Tampa Bay Buccaneers at Dallas Cowboys – Game summary

Quarter	1	2	3	4	Total
**Buccaneers**	6	6	7	0	**19**
Cowboys	3	0	0	0	**3**

at AT&T Stadium, Arlington, Texas

- Date: September 11
- Game time: 8:20 p.m. EDT/7:20 p.m. CDT
- Game weather: None (retractable roof closed)
- Game attendance: 93,797
- Referee: Ronald Torbert
- TV announcers (NBC): Mike Tirico, Cris Collinsworth and Melissa Stark
- Recap, Game Book

Game information

**First quarter**

- DAL – Brett Maher 51-yard field goal, 9:02. Cowboys 3–0. **Drive: 14 plays, 54 yards, 5:58.**
- TB – Ryan Succop 44-yard field goal, 5:05. Tied 3–3. **Drive: 7 plays, 49 yards, 3:57.**
- TB – Ryan Succop 38-yard field goal, 1:06. Buccaneers 6–3. **Drive: 7 plays, 49 yards, 2:47.**

**Second quarter**

- TB – Ryan Succop 29-yard field goal, 3:25. Buccaneers 9–3. **Drive: 5 plays, 12 yards, 2:41.**
- TB – Ryan Succop 47-yard field goal, 0:14. Buccaneers 12–3. **Drive: 8 plays, 61 yards, 1:32.**

**Third quarter**

- TB – Mike Evans 5-yard pass from Tom Brady (Ryan Succop kick), 3:23. Buccaneers 19–3. **Drive: 9 plays, 79 yards, 4:44.**

**Fourth quarter**

- **No scoring plays.**

**Top passers**

- TB – Tom Brady – 18/27, 212 yards, TD, INT
- DAL – Dak Prescott – 14/29, 134 yards, INT

**Top rushers**

- TB – Leonard Fournette – 21 rushes, 127 yards
- DAL – Ezekiel Elliott – 10 rushes, 52 yards

**Top receivers**

- TB – Mike Evans – 5 receptions, 71 yards, TD
- DAL – Noah Brown – 5 receptions, 68 yards

Tampa Bay visited Dallas on Sunday Night Football, the second year in a row that the Buccaneers faced the Cowboys in primetime in Week 1. Tampa Bay defeated Dallas 19–3, behind a dominating defensive performance. Quarterback Tom Brady, coming off an eventful offseason which saw him retire, unretire, then take an 11-day leave of absence during training camp, started his third season under center for Tampa Bay. Brady threw for 212 yards and one touchdown, and became the oldest starting quarterback in NFL history. Leonard Fournette, however, was the offensive star of the night. Fournette rushed for 127 yards and caught two passes for 10 yards. New head coach Todd Bowles won his debut with Tampa Bay.

Dallas took the opening kickoff and drove 54 yards in 14 plays to the Tampa Bay 32. Brett Maher kicked a 51-yard field goal for an early 3–0 lead. It would be the only points of the night for Dallas. Tampa Bay answered with a 44-yard field goal by Ryan Succop and a 3–3 tie. The drive was sparked by a 24-yard catch and run by Chris Godwin, his first game back after suffering an ACL injury in 2021. Dallas went three-and-out and punted on their second drive. Brady found Mike Evans on a 19-yard gain, then two plays later Fournette blasted for 17 yards to the Dallas 25. The drive stalled, however, and Succop's second field goal gave Tampa Bay a 6–3 lead.

Offensive futility plagued Dallas, as they went three-and-out again. Later, Dak Prescott was intercepted by Antoine Winfield Jr. deep in Cowboys territory. However, Tampa Bay struggled in the red zone, and once again had to settle for a field goal. Leading 9–6, the Buccaneers got the ball with 1:46 left in the second quarter. Brady's 48-yard bomb to Julio Jones set the Buccaneers up at the Dallas 29 yard line. Succop's fourth field goal with 19 seconds remaining gave Tampa Bay a 12–3 halftime lead.

Brady's 5-yard touchdown pass to Mike Evans in the third quarter was the only touchdown of the night. Brady found Evans on the left side of the endzone. Evans, falling backwards, reached up and grabbed the ball with one hand, and pulled it into his chest for the score.

Trailing 19–3, Dallas was unable to mount any sort of comeback. Quarterback Dak Prescott left the game in the fourth quarter with a fractured thumb, and was replaced by Cooper Rush. The 3 total points by Dallas was their worst opening day score since 1989. Tampa Bay started the season off 1–0, and Brady himself improved to 7–0 all-time against the Cowboys. This was also Tampa Bay's first win at AT&T Stadium, and only their second ever road win over the Cowboys, with their first coming in 2001.

==== Week 2: at New Orleans Saints ====
Week 2: Tampa Bay Buccaneers at New Orleans Saints – Game summary

Quarter	1	2	3	4	Total
**Buccaneers**	0	0	3	17	**20**
Saints	3	0	0	7	**10**

at Caesars Superdome, New Orleans, Louisiana

- Date: September 18
- Game time: 1:00 p.m. EDT/12:00 p.m. CDT
- Game weather: None (indoor stadium)
- Game attendance: 70,040
- Referee: Shawn Hochuli
- TV announcers (Fox): Kevin Burkhardt, Greg Olsen, Erin Andrews and Tom Rinaldi
- Recap, Game Book

Game information

**First quarter**

- NO – Wil Lutz 31-yard field goal, 9:02. Saints 3–0. **Drive: 11 plays, 63 yards, 5:58.**

**Second quarter**

- No scoring plays.

**Third quarter**

- TB – Ryan Succop 47-yard field goal, 6:44. Tied 3–3. **Drive: 9 plays, 28 yards, 3:09.**

**Fourth quarter**

- TB – Breshad Perriman 28-yard pass from Tom Brady (Ryan Succop kick), 7:41. Buccaneers 10–3. **Drive: 9 plays, 80 yards, 4:07.**
- TB – Ryan Succop 47-yard field goal, 5:50. Buccaneers 13–3. **Drive: 4 plays, 0 yards, 0:55.**
- TB – Mike Edwards 68-yard interception return (Ryan Succop kick), 4:11. Buccaneers 20–3.
- NO – Michael Thomas 7-yard pass from Jameis Winston (Wil Lutz kick), 3:02. Buccaneers 20–10. **Drive: 6 plays, 75 yards, 1:09.**

**Top passers**

- TB – Tom Brady – 18/34, 190 yards, TD
- NO – Jameis Winston – 25/40, 236 yards, TD, 3 INT

**Top rushers**

- TB – Leonard Fournette – 24 rushes, 65 yards
- NO – Mark Ingram II – 10 rushes, 60 yards

**Top receivers**

- TB – Russell Gage – 5 receptions, 28 yards
- NO – Michael Thomas – 6 receptions, 65 yards, TD

Tampa Bay snapped a six-game regular season losing streak to division rival New Orleans. A chippy, defensive struggle through three quarters, the Buccaneers capitalized on five second half Saints turnovers to pull away for a 20–10 victory. Quarterback Tom Brady had just an average performance, throwing for only 190 yards and one touchdown pass. Leonard Fournette was held to only 65 yards rushing on 24 carries. But the Buccaneers won the turnover battle, and two clutch field goals and a "pick-6" put the game out of reach. The Buccaneers offense was missing Julio Jones (knee), Chris Godwin (hamstring), and Donovan Smith (elbow), all out with injuries.

The Saints took the opening kickoff, and drove 63 yards in 11 plays. The Tampa Bay defense stiffened in the red zone, and New Orleans settled for a Wil Lutz field goal and a 3–0 lead. Tampa Bay's first drive looked promising, as they drove to the Saints 26 yard line. Facing 3rd-and-1, Brady fumbled a bad snap, and the Saints recovered. The Saints managed one first down, but a Taysom Hill run on third down was tackled a for a loss and the Saints were forced to punt.

On the first play of the second quarter, Mike Evans broke free on a busted coverage, and was wide open for a 41-yard gain down to the Saints 31. Facing a 4th & inches at the 8 yard line, Leonard Fournette was stuffed for no gain. Tampa Bay's second drive came up empty, as they turned the ball over on downs. Neither team was able to get much going on offense in the second quarter. New Orleans led 3–0 at halftime.

Tampa Bay finally got on the board in the second half. Ryan Succop kicked a 47-yard field goal to tie the game at 3–3 with 6:49 left in the third quarter. On the ensuing drive, New Orleans drove to the Tampa Bay 20. Mark Ingram II took a handoff for 9 yards to the 11 yard line, but the ball came loose and was recovered by Tampa Bay. The score remained 3–3.

The fourth quarter began with Tampa Bay driving. The Saints forced a three-and-out, but were flagged for Too Many Men on the Field during the punt, and Tampa Bay got a free first down. Facing 3rd-and-5 at their own 29, Brady's pass attempt to Scotty Miller fell incomplete. After the play, an argument broke out on the field, which escalated into a melee. Marshon Lattimore exchanged heated words with Tom Brady, then traded shoves with Leonard Fournette. Mike Evans tackled Lattimore to the turf and a fight between the two teams ensued. It was the second such altercation between Evans and Lattimore, after a previous one in 2017. Both Evans and Lattimore were ejected, the penalties offset. Jake Camarda's punt went off the side of his foot and netted only 26 yards.

Jameis Winston threw deep to Chris Olave, but was picked off by Jamel Dean in the endzone. The turnover appeared to spark the Buccaneers, as they drove 80 yards in 9 plays for the game's first touchdown. Brady found Breshad Perriman in the right corner of the endzone for a 28-yard touchdown pass and a 10–3 lead. Two plays later, Winston threw another interception, again picked off by Jamel Dean. The turnover led to a Succop field goal, and a 13–3 lead with 5:55 left in regulation.

Mike Edwards picked off Jameis Winston, his third straight interception thrown, and ran it back 68 yards for a touchdown to take control of the game with 4:23 to go. The Buccaneers held on for a 20–10 victory, started 2–0 for the second season in a row, and scored their first win over the Saints since week 1 of the 2018 season. One day after the game, Mike Evans was suspended by the league for one game for his role in the altercation with Marshon Lattimore.

==== Week 3: vs. Green Bay Packers ====
Week 3: Green Bay Packers at Tampa Bay Buccaneers – Game summary

Quarter	1	2	3	4	Total
**Packers**	7	7	0	0	**14**
Buccaneers	3	0	3	6	**12**

at Raymond James Stadium, Tampa, Florida

- Date: September 25
- Game time: 4:25 p.m. EDT
- Game weather: Cloudy, 88 °F (31 °C)
- Game attendance: 69,197
- Referee: Scott Novak
- TV announcers (Fox): Kevin Burkhardt, Greg Olsen, Erin Andrews and Tom Rinaldi
- Recap, Game Book

Game information

**First quarter**

- TB – Ryan Succop 45-yard field goal, 9:05. Buccaneers 3–0. **Drive: 10 plays, 48 yards, 5:55.**
- GB – Romeo Doubs 5-yard pass from Aaron Rodgers (Mason Crosby kick), 3:01. Packers 7–3. **Drive: 10 plays, 75 yards, 6;04.**

**Second quarter**

- GB – Allen Lazard 6-yard pass from Aaron Rodgers (Mason Crosby kick), 8:44. Packers 14–3. **Drive: 12 plays, 71 yards, 6:49.**

**Third quarter**

- TB – Ryan Succop 45-yard field goal, 6:22. Packers 14–6. **Drive: 5 plays, 20 yards, 1:30.**

**Fourth quarter**

- TB – Russell Gage 1-yard pass from Tom Brady (pass failed), 0:14. Packers 14–12. **Drive: 13 plays, 89 yards, 2:50.**

**Top passers**

- GB – Aaron Rodgers – 27/35, 255 yards, 2 TD, INT
- TB – Tom Brady – 31/42, 271 yards, TD

**Top rushers**

- GB – Aaron Jones – 12 rushes, 36 yards
- TB – Leonard Fournette – 12 rushes, 35 yards

**Top receivers**

- GB – Romeo Doubs – 8 receptions, 73 yards, TD
- TB – Russell Gage – 12 receptions, 87 yards, TD

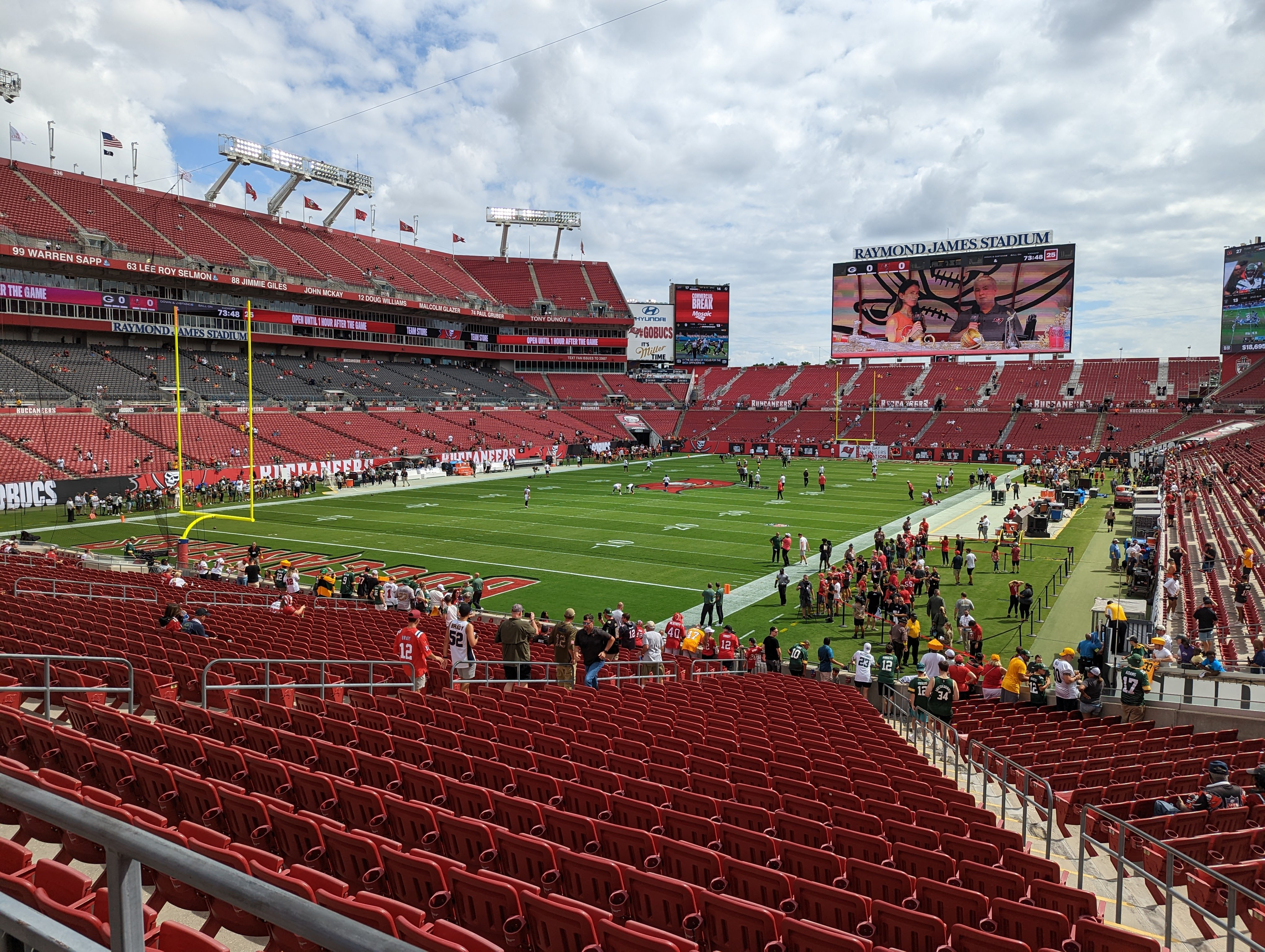
Pre-game activities prior to Tampa Bay versus Green Bay.

Tampa Bay hosted Green Bay in their home opener. The Tampa Bay offense was without wide receivers Mike Evans (suspension), Chris Godwin (hamstring), and Julio Jones (knee). Quarterback Tom Brady threw a 1-yard touchdown pass to Russell Gage with 14 seconds left in regulation. However, the ensuing two-point conversion attempt failed, and the Packers held on for a 14–12 win.

Tampa Bay received the opening kickoff, and drove 48 yards in ten plays. Ryan Succop kicked a 45-yard field goal, giving the Buccaneers a 3–0 lead. Green Bay controlled the rest of the first half offensively. Aaron Rodgers threw touchdown passes on Green Bay's next two drives, putting the Packers ahead 14–3.

Late in the second quarter, Rodgers connected with Randall Cobb for 40 yards down to the Tampa Bay 22. Facing 3rd-and-goal at the 5 yard line, Rodgers completed a pass to Aaron Jones to the 2, but the ball was knocked away for a fumble. Vita Vea recovered the loose ball in the endzone for a touchback, and the Tampa Bay defense snuffed out Green Bay's drive. The Buccaneers squandered a scoring opportunity in the final minute of the first half. Brady's pass to Breshad Perriman at the Green Bay 26 was subsequently fumbled and recovered by Green Bay. The Packers led 14–3 at halftime.

Momentum shifted towards Tampa Bay, particularly the defense, in the second half. The Packers punted on six of their next seven drives, and were shutout in the second half. Midway through the third quarter, Rodgers was picked off by Logan Ryan near midfield. The turnover lead to a Buccaneers field goal, and the deficit was trimmed to 14–6.

Tampa Bay got the ball with 3:04 left in the fourth quarter. Brady led the Buccaneers on decisive 13-play, 89-yard drive. Facing 3rd-and-goal at the Green Bay 1, Brady found Russell Gage for a 1-yard touchdown pass with 14 seconds left. Tampa Bay lined up for a potential game-tying two-conversion attempt, but allowed the play clock to run out, and were flagged for Delay of game. After a five-yard penalty, the second two-point conversion attempt failed. Brady's pass intended for Gage was tipped and fell incomplete.

==== Week 4: vs. Kansas City Chiefs ====
Week 4: Kansas City Chiefs at Tampa Bay Buccaneers – Game summary

Quarter	1	2	3	4	Total
**Chiefs**	14	14	10	3	**41**
Buccaneers	3	14	7	7	**31**

at Raymond James Stadium, Tampa, Florida

- Date: October 2
- Game time: 8:20 p.m. EDT
- Game weather: Clear, 75 °F (24 °C)
- Game attendance: 68,348
- Referee: Bill Vinovich
- TV announcers (NBC): Mike Tirico, Cris Collinsworth and Melissa Stark
- Recap, Game Book

Game information

**First quarter**

- KC – Travis Kelce 16-yard pass from Patrick Mahomes (Matthew Wright kick), 14:14. Chiefs 7–0. **Drive: 2 plays, 21 yards, 0:42.**
- TB – Ryan Succop 45-yard field goal, 3:01. Chiefs 7–3. **Drive: 7 plays, 45 yards, 4:02.**
- KC – Clyde Edwards-Helaire 3-yard run (Matthew Wright kick), 4:01. Chiefs 14–3. **Drive: 12 plays, 79 yards, 6:11.**

**Second quarter**

- KC – Clyde Edwards-Helaire 2-yard pass from Patrick Mahomes (Matthew Wright kick), 11:26. Chiefs 21–3. **Drive: 11 plays, 82 yards, 5:52.**
- TB – Mike Evans 13-yard pass from Tom Brady (Ryan Succop kick), 8:50. Chiefs 21–10. **Drive: 6 plays, 75 yards, 2:36.**
- KC – Noah Gray 1-yard run (Matthew Wright kick), 2:11. Chiefs 28–10. **Drive: 6 plays, 20 yards, 2:51.**
- TB – Mike Evans 1-yard pass from Tom Brady (Ryan Succop kick), 0:10. Chiefs 28–17. **Drive: 12 plays, 75 yards, 2:01.**

**Third quarter**

- KC – Matthew Wright 44-yard field goal, 11:26. Chiefs 31–17. **Drive: 10 plays, 49 yards, 3:34.**
- KC – Jody Fortson 10-yard pass from Patrick Mahomes (Ryan Succop kick), 5:42. Chiefs 38–17. **Drive: 9 plays, 65 yards, 4:49.**
- TB – Rachaad White 1-yard run (Ryan Succop kick), 0:44. Chiefs 38–24. **Drive: 11 plays, 75 yards, 4:58.**

**Fourth quarter**

- KC – Matthew Wright 32-yard field goal, 10:47. Chiefs 41–24. **Drive: 9 plays, 46 yards, 4:57.**
- TB – Leonard Fournette 5-yard pass from Tom Brady (Ryan Succop kick), 3:30. Chiefs 41–31. **Drive: 5 plays, 34 yards, 1:12.**

**Top passers**

- KC – Patrick Mahomes – 23/37, 249 yards, 3 TD, INT
- TB – Tom Brady – 39/52, 385 yards, 3 TD

**Top rushers**

- KC – Clyde Edwards-Helaire – 19 rushes, 92 yards, TD
- TB – Rachaad White – 3 rushes, 6 yards, TD

**Top receivers**

- KC – Travis Kelce – 9 receptions, 92 yards, TD
- TB – Mike Evans – 8 receptions, 103 yards, 2 TD

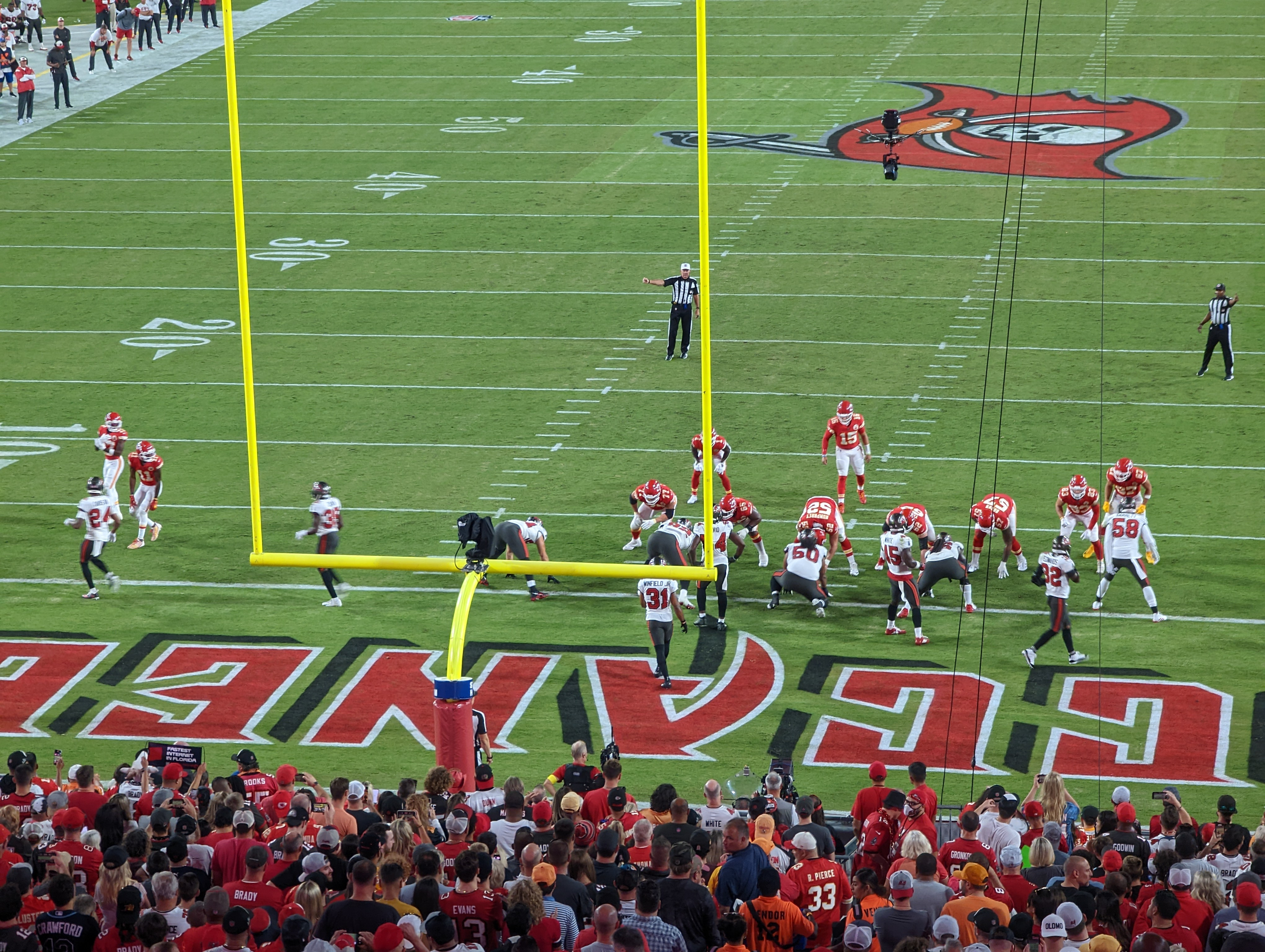
Game action between Tampa Bay and Kansas City.

Tampa Bay hosted Kansas City on Sunday Night Football. The game was a rematch of Super Bowl LV. In the week leading up to the game, Hurricane Ian was predicted to impact the Tampa Bay area. The Buccaneers staff, coaches, and players evacuated to Miami on Tuesday, and conducted practice at the Miami Dolphins facility. The storm put the status of the game in doubt. Tentative plans were made to relocate the game to U.S. Bank Stadium in Minneapolis. However, the storm made landfall further to the south, and the game was played at Raymond James Stadium as scheduled. Club management released a statement after the storm, "We are also very thankful that the Tampa Bay area was spared the most damaging consequences of this powerful storm (of Hurricane Ian)." They also thanked law enforcement officials and emergency personnel for monitoring and enhancing safety of residents around Tampa. During pregame ceremonies, first responders were honored for their service during the storm.

Rachaad White fumbled away the opening kickoff, and Kansas City recovered. On the second play from scrimmage, Patrick Mahomes found Travis Kelce for a 16-yard touchdown pass, and built an early lead the Chiefs would never surrender. Mahomes threw for 249 yards and 3 touchdown passes as Kansas City overpowered Tampa Bay by a score of 41–31.

With wide receivers Mike Evans, Chris Godwin, and Julio Jones back in the lineup, the Tampa Bay passing offense improved over the previous week. Quarterback Tom Brady threw for 385 yards and three touchdown passes. The Tampa Bay rushing attack, however, was futile. The Buccaneers rushed for only 3 yards on 6 attempts.

Trailing 41–24 with 4:58 left in the fourth quarter, Sean Murphy-Bunting intercepted Patrick Mahomes, and returned the ball 33 yards to the Kansas City 34 yard line. Brady's 5-yard touchdown pass to Leonard Fournette narrowed the deficit to 41–31 with 3:30 left. The Buccaneers got the ball back with 45 seconds left, but time ran out to mount any sort of comeback.

==== Week 5: vs. Atlanta Falcons ====
Week 5: Atlanta Falcons at Tampa Bay Buccaneers – Game summary

Quarter	1	2	3	4	Total
Falcons	0	0	0	15	**15**
**Buccaneers**	0	13	8	0	**21**

at Raymond James Stadium, Tampa, Florida

- Date: October 9
- Game time: 1:00 p.m. EDT
- Game weather: Clear, 83 °F (28 °C)
- Game attendance: 68,299
- Referee: Jerome Boger
- TV announcers (Fox): Joe Davis, Daryl Johnston and Pam Oliver
- Recap, Game Book

Game information

**First quarter**

- No scoring plays.

**Second quarter**

- TB – Leonard Fournette 1-yard run (Ryan Succop kick), 9:31. Buccaneers 7–0. **Drive: 13 plays, 88 yards, 5:21.**
- TB – Ryan Succop 21-yard field goal, 1:18. Buccaneers 10–0. **Drive: 13 plays, 84 yards, 4:25.**
- TB – Ryan Succop 44-yard field goal, 0:00. Buccaneers 13–0. **Drive: 4 plays, 32 yards, 0:20.**

**Third quarter**

- TB – Leonard Fournette 1-yard pass from Tom Brady (Tom Brady-Russell Gage pass), 6:09. Buccaneers 21–0. **Drive: 11 plays, 74 yards, 4:19.**

**Fourth quarter**

- ATL – Avery Williams 8-yard run (Younghoe Koo kick), 13:39. Buccaneers 21–7. **Drive: 6 plays, 43 yards, 3:04.**
- ATL – Olamide Zaccheaus 19-yard pass from Marcus Mariota (Marcus Mariota-KhaDarel Hodge pass), 4:38. Buccaneers 21–15. **Drive: 12 plays, 70 yards, 5:11.**

**Top passers**

- ATL – Marcus Mariota – 14/25, 147 yards, TD
- TB – Tom Brady – 35/52, 351 yards, TD

**Top rushers**

- ATL – Marcus Mariota – 7 rushes, 61 yards
- TB – Leonard Fournette – 14 rushes, 56 yards, TD

**Top receivers**

- ATL – Drake London – 4 receptions, 35 yards
- TB – Leonard Fournette – 10 receptions, 83 yards, TD

Tampa Bay hosted division rival Atlanta. The Buccaneers built a 21–0 lead through three quarters, and held on for a 21–15 victory. Leonard Fournette was the offensive standout for the day. He rushed for 56 yards and one rushing touchdown, and caught 10 passes for 83 yards and one receiving touchdown.

Both teams punted on their first possessions. On their second possession, Tampa Bay drove to the Atlanta 15 yard line. Tom Brady's pass to Cade Otton appeared to give the Buccaneers a first down, but the ball was spotted short of the line to gain. One the next play, facing 4th-and-inches, Leonard Fournette was tackled for no gain, and Tampa Bay turned the ball over on downs.

Tampa Bay got the ball back to start the second quarter. Facing a 3rd-and-3 at the Atlanta 37, Brady kept the drive alive with a 25-yard pass to Mike Evans. Three plays later, Fournette was in the endzone with a 1-yard run. Tampa Bay took a 7–0 lead. On their next drive, Tampa Bay drove 84 yards in 13 plays. Ryan Succop's 21-yard chip-shot field goal made the score 10–0.

Inside the two-minute warning, the Falcons got to the Tampa Bay 25-yard line. Antoine Winfield Jr. sacked Marcus Mariota for a loss of 9, pushing them back to the 34. With 24 seconds left in the half, Younghoe Koo's 52-yard field goal attempt into the wind sailed wide right. With 9 seconds left, Brady found Fournette for a quick completion to the 26, and he ran out of bounds with 3 seconds on the clock. Ryan Succop kicked a wobbly 44-yard field goal as time expired in the half, and Tampa Bay led 13–0.

In the third quarter, Tom Brady threw deep to Mike Evans, who broke free for a 40-yard gain all the way to the Atlanta 1-yard line. On the next play, Brady threw to Fournette for the touchdown, and followed it up with a two-point conversion pass to Russell Gage. Tampa Bay led 21–0 at the end of the third quarter.

Atlanta tried to rally in the fourth quarter, as Tampa Bay's offense went cold. The Buccaneers went three-and-out on three straight drives, while the Falcons put up two touchdowns to trim the deficit to 21–15. With 3:18 left in regulation, Tampa Bay faced a 3rd-and-3 at their own 43. Brady's pass was incomplete, but a defensive holding penalty on Atlanta gave the Buccaneers a first down. Three plays later, Tampa Bay faced another 3rd down. Tom Brady was sacked for a loss of 10, but Grady Jarrett was called for roughing the passer. Brady then made a crucial 9-yard completion to Mike Evans for a first down just before the two-minute warning. Brady was then able to take a knee to seal the victory.

The Tampa Bay defense held Atlanta scoreless through three quarters, sacked Marcus Mariota five times, and held the Falcons to only 89 yards in the first half. The Buccaneers won their fifth straight against the Falcons, and Tom Brady remained undefeated individually against Atlanta. Tampa Bay improved to 3–2 on the season, taking the lead in the NFC South.

==== Week 6: at Pittsburgh Steelers ====
Week 6: Tampa Bay Buccaneers at Pittsburgh Steelers – Game summary

Quarter	1	2	3	4	Total
Buccaneers	3	6	3	6	**18**
**Steelers**	7	3	3	7	**20**

at Acrisure Stadium, Pittsburgh, Pennsylvania

- Date: October 16
- Game time: 1:00 p.m. EDT
- Game weather: Cloudy, 62 °F (17 °C)
- Game attendance: 67,307
- Referee: Shawn Smith
- TV announcers (Fox): Brandon Gaudin, Daryl Johnston and Pam Oliver
- Recap, Game Book

Game information

**First quarter**

- PIT – Najee Harris 6-yard pass from Kenny Pickett (Chris Boswell kick), 7:38. Steelers 7–0. **Drive: 11 plays, 66 yards, 6:24.**
- TB – Ryan Succop 30-yard field goal, 2:50. Steelers 7–3. **Drive: 12 plays, 60 yards, 4:48.**

**Second quarter**

- TB – Ryan Succop 27-yard field goal, 11:01. Steelers 7–6. **Drive: 11 plays, 45 yards, 5:24.**
- PIT – Chris Boswell 55-yard field goal, 4:07. Steelers 10–6. **Drive: 12 plays, 44 yards, 6:54.**
- TB – Ryan Succop 54-yard field goal, 0:00. Steelers 10–9. **Drive: 4 plays, 15 yards, 0:23.**

**Third quarter**

- PIT – Chris Boswell 25-yard field goal, 13:55. Steelers 13–9. **Drive: 4 plays, 5 yards, 1:05.**
- TB – Ryan Succop 24-yard field goal, 7:24. Steelers 13–12. **Drive: 14 plays, 69 yards, 6:31.**

**Fourth quarter**

- PIT – Chase Claypool 6-yard pass from Mitchell Trubisky (Chris Boswell kick), 9:55. Steelers 20–12. **Drive: 8 plays, 71 yards, 3:43.**
- TB – Leonard Fournette 8-yard pass from Tom Brady (pass failed), 4:38. Steelers 20–18. **Drive: 14 plays, 73 yards, 5:17.**

**Top passers**

- TB – Tom Brady – 25/40, 253 yards, TD
- PIT – Kenny Pickett – 11/18, 67 yards, TD

**Top rushers**

- TB – Leonard Fournette – 21 rushes, 63 yards
- PIT – Najee Harris – 14 rushes, 42 yards

**Top receivers**

- TB – Chris Godwin – 6 receptions, 95 yards
- PIT – Chase Claypool – 7 receptions, 96 yards, TD

Tom Brady's two-point conversion pass to Chris Godwin was knocked down at the goal line, and Tampa Bay fell 20–18 at Pittsburgh. The Buccaneers offense struggled, reaching the endzone only once, and going only 4-for-14 on third down conversions. The Buccaneers fell to 3–3 and into a tie for first place in the NFC South division.

The Steelers took a 7–0 lead in the first quarter with Kenny Pickett's 6-yard touchdown pass to Najee Harris. Ryan Succop kicked three first-half field goals, and the Buccaneers trailed 10–9 at halftime.

Steven Sims ran the second half kickoff back 89 yards to the Tampa Bay 12 yard line. Pittsburgh added a field goal and stretched their lead to 13–9. Tampa Bay drove 69 yards in 14 plays. Despite a 1st-and-goal at the Pittsburgh 4 yard line, the Buccaneers had to settle for field goal. The Steelers led 13–12 at the end of the third quarter.

With Kenny Pickett out of the game due to concussion protocol, Mitchell Trubisky took over at quarterback for the Steelers. After a Tampa Bay three-and-out, Trubisky threw a 6-yard touchdown to Chase Claypool. Trailing 20–12, Tom Brady drove the Buccaneers 73 yard in 14 plays, including two fourth down conversions. On 1st-and-10 at the Pittsburgh 11, Brady completed to Leonard Fournette for an 11-yard touchdown pass. The two-point conversion failed, and the score was 20–18 with 4:45 to go. Tampa Bay was unable to get the ball back, and the Steelers ran out the clock for the victory.

==== Week 7: at Carolina Panthers ====
Week 7: Tampa Bay Buccaneers at Carolina Panthers – Game summary

Quarter	1	2	3	4	Total
Buccaneers	0	0	0	3	**3**
**Panthers**	0	7	7	7	**21**

at Bank of America Stadium, Charlotte, North Carolina

- Date: October 23
- Game time: 1:00 p.m. EDT
- Game weather: Sunny, 67 °F (19 °C)
- Game attendance: 71,941
- Referee: Craig Wrolstad
- TV announcers (Fox): Kenny Albert, Jonathan Vilma and Shannon Spake
- Recap, Game Book

Game information

**First quarter**

- No scoring plays.

**Second quarter**

- CAR – D. J. Moore 20-yard pass from P. J. Walker (Eddy Piñeiro kick), 0:29. Panthers 7–0. **Drive: 6 plays, 80 yards, 2:47.**

**Third quarter**

- CAR – Chuba Hubbard 17-yard run (Eddy Piñeiro kick), 3:11. Panthers 14–0. **Drive: 3 plays, 77 yards, 0:49.**

**Fourth quarter**

- TB – Ryan Succop 27-yard field goal, 13:38. Panthers 14–3. **Drive: 14 plays, 67 yards, 4:33.**
- CAR – Tommy Tremble 29-yard pass from P. J. Walker (Eddy Piñeiro kick), 9:33. Panthers 21–3. **Drive: 7 plays, 75 yards, 4:05.**

**Top passers**

- TB – Tom Brady – 32/49, 290 yards
- CAR – P. J. Walker – 16/22, 177 yards, 2 TD

**Top rushers**

- TB – Rachaad White – 6 rushes, 24 yards
- CAR – D'Onta Foreman – 15 rushes, 118 yards

**Top receivers**

- TB – Mike Evans – 9 receptions, 96 yards
- CAR – D. J. Moore – 7 receptions, 69 yards, TD

Tampa Bay lost their fourth game in five weeks, and dropped to 3–4 on the season. Quarterback Tom Brady fell to the Panthers for the first time since Week 4 of 2017, and fell to 3–4 in a season for only the second time in his career. The Buccaneers converted only two of twelve third down attempts and were stopped twice in three fourth down attempts. The Panthers win came days after trading Christian McCaffrey to the 49ers.

The tone for the day was set early. On the third play of the game, Brady threw deep downfield to a wide open Mike Evans. Evans was ten yards clear from any defender, but the ball was juggled off of his fingertips, and dropped incomplete at the 25 yard line. It would have been an effortless, walk-in touchdown, but the drive came up empty, and seemingly the Buccaneers never recovered. The first quarter ended scoreless.

Carolina led 7–0 at halftime after a 20-yard P. J. Walker touchdown pass to D. J. Moore near the back of the endzone. Late in the third quarter, D'Onta Foreman gassed the Buccaneers defense with a 60-yard rush down to the Tampa Bay 17. One play later, Chuba Hubbard was in the endzone with a 17-yard scoring run, and Carolina led 14–0.

At the start of the fourth quarter, the Buccaneers finally reached the red zone. With a 1st-and-goal at the Carolina 8, Brady threw three incompletions, and they settled for a Ryan Succop field goal. It would be their only points of the game.

==== Week 8: vs. Baltimore Ravens ====
Week 8: Baltimore Ravens at Tampa Bay Buccaneers – Game summary

Quarter	1	2	3	4	Total
**Ravens**	3	0	14	10	**27**
Buccaneers	10	0	0	12	**22**

at Raymond James Stadium, Tampa, Florida

- Date: October 27
- Game time: 8:15 p.m. EDT
- Game weather: Cloudy, 79 °F (26 °C)
- Game attendance: 68,912
- Referee: Carl Cheffers
- TV announcers (WTVT/Prime Video): Al Michaels, Kirk Herbstreit and Kaylee Hartung
- Recap, Game Book

Game information

**First quarter**

- BAL – Justin Tucker 22-yard field goal, 11:03. Ravens 3–0. **Drive: 4 plays, 2 yards, 1:34.**
- TB – Leonard Fournette 1-yard run (Ryan Succop kick), 6:56. Buccaneers 7–3. **Drive: 8 plays, 75 yards, 4:07.**
- TB – Ryan Succop 31-yard field goal, 0:26. Buccaneers 10–3. **Drive: 10 plays, 50 yards, 4:41.**

**Second quarter**

- No scoring plays.

**Third quarter**

- BAL – Kenyan Drake 5-yard pass from Lamar Jackson (Justin Tucker kick), 9:05. Tied 10–10. **Drive: 9 plays, 77 yards, 4:53.**
- BAL – Isaiah Likely 10-yard pass from Lamar Jackson (Justin Tucker kick), 0:05. Ravens 17–10. **Drive: 11 plays, 80 yards, 6:52.**

**Fourth quarter**

- TB – Ryan Succop 30-yard field goal, 12:26. Ravens 17–13. **Drive: 8 plays, 63 yards, 2:39.**
- BAL – Devin Duvernay 15-yard run (Justin Tucker kick), 6:55. Ravens 24–13. **Drive: 9 plays, 83 yards, 5:31.**
- TB – Ryan Succop 26-yard field goal, 4:54. Ravens 24–16. **Drive: 9 plays, 67 yards, 2:01.**
- BAL – Justin Tucker 30-yard field goal, 1:45. Ravens 27–16. **Drive: 5 plays, 49 yards, 2:42.**
- TB – Julio Jones 8-yard pass from Tom Brady (run failed), 0:49. Ravens 27–22. **Drive: 11 plays, 75 yards, 1:23.**

**Top passers**

- BAL – Lamar Jackson – 27/38, 238 yards, 2 TD
- TB – Tom Brady – 26/44, 325 yards, TD

**Top rushers**

- BAL – Gus Edwards – 11 rushes, 65 yards
- TB – Leonard Fournette – 9 rushes, 24 yards, TD

**Top receivers**

- BAL – Isaiah Likely – 6 receptions, 77 yards, TD
- TB – Mike Evans – 6 receptions, 123 yards

Tampa Bay lost their third straight game, falling to Baltimore on Thursday Night Football to drop to 3–5 on the season, their worst start since 2018. Quarterback Tom Brady threw for 325 yards and one touchdown pass. Brady set the record for most career sacks (556), and lost a third straight start for the first time since 2002.

The Ravens received the opening kickoff, but managed only one first down on the drive. Justin Tucker punted, and the ball was fielded at the 11 yard line. Dee Delaney, however, was blocked and ran into his own teammate causing return man Jaelon Darden to muff the punt. The Ravens recovered the ball at the Tampa Bay 6 yard line, and the turnover led to field goal. On the next possession, Tampa Bay drove 75 yards in 8 plays, scoring their first opening drive touchdown all season. Chris Godwin's 44-yard catch and run set up Leonard Fournette's 1-yard touchdown run. The Buccaneers added a field goal late in the first quarter, and led 10–3.

In the second quarter, the Ravens failed on a 4th & 2 at the Tampa Bay 9 yard line, then had field goal attempt blocked as time expired. The Buccaneers held the 10–3 lead into halftime.

The Ravens rushing attack wore out a tired Buccaneers defense in the second half. Trailing 27–16 with 2:16 left in regulation, Brady drove the Buccaneers 75 yards in 11 plays. Julio Jones caught an 8-yard touchdown pass with 49 seconds left, but the ensuing two-point conversion try failed. With the score 27–22, an onside kick attempt failed, and Baltimore held on for the victory.

==== Week 9: vs. Los Angeles Rams ====
Week 9: Los Angeles Rams at Tampa Bay Buccaneers – Game summary

Quarter	1	2	3	4	Total
Rams	0	7	6	0	**13**
**Buccaneers**	3	3	0	10	**16**

at Raymond James Stadium, Tampa, Florida

- Date: November 6
- Game time: 4:25 p.m. EST
- Game weather: Cloudy, 88 °F (31 °C)
- Game attendance: 69,019
- Referee: Shawn Hochuli
- TV announcers (CBS): Jim Nantz, Tony Romo and Tracy Wolfson
- Recap, Game Book

Game information

**First quarter**

- TB – Ryan Succop 20-yard field goal, 7:16. Buccaneers 3–0. **Drive: 12 plays, 54 yards, 6:35.**

**Second quarter**

- LAR – Cooper Kupp 69-yard pass from Matthew Stafford (Matt Gay kick), 12:57. Rams 7–3. **Drive: 8 plays, 91 yards, 4:03.**
- TB – Ryan Succop 38-yard field goal, 0:24. Rams 7–6. **Drive: 9 plays, 70 yards, 1:33.**

**Third quarter**

- LAR – Matt Gay 26-yard field goal, 9:14. Rams 10–6. **Drive: 11 plays, 67 yards, 4:48.**
- LAR – Matt Gay 35-yard field goal, 0:09. Rams 13–6. **Drive: 6 plays, 31 yards, 3:47.**

**Fourth quarter**

- TB – Ryan Succop 50-yard field goal, 8:07. Rams 13–9. **Drive: 9 plays, 30 yards, 3:30.**
- TB – Cade Otton 1-yard pass from Tom Brady (Ryan Succop kick), 0:09. Buccaneers 16–13. **Drive: 6 plays, 60 yards, 0:35.**

**Top passers**

- LAR – Matthew Stafford – 13/27, 165 yards, TD
- TB – Tom Brady – 36/58, 280 yards, TD

**Top rushers**

- LAR – Darrell Henderson – 12 rushes, 56 yards
- TB – Rachaad White – 8 rushes, 27 yards

**Top receivers**

- LAR – Cooper Kupp – 8 receptions, 127 yards, TD
- TB – Cade Otton – 5 receptions, 68 yards, TD

Tom Brady threw a 1-yard touchdown pass to Cade Otton with 9 seconds left in regulation to lift the Buccaneers over the visiting Rams. Tampa Bay snapped a three-game losing streak, and moved back into first place in the NFC South. During the game, Brady became the first player in NFL history to eclipse 100,000 passing yards (combined regular season & postseason), and he also achieved his 43rd career fourth quarter comeback, tying the mark set by Peyton Manning. Tampa Bay defeated the defending Super Bowl champion Rams, snapped a three-game losing streak to Los Angeles, and also avenged a divisional round playoff loss from the previous January. In a mostly defensive battle, the Tampa Bay defense held Matthew Stafford to only 165 yards passing, and held the Rams to 4-for-15 on third down conversions.

Los Angeles received the opening kickoff, but went three-and-out and punted. On Tampa Bay's first drive, they drove 54 yards in 12 plays, reaching the Los Angeles 2 yard line. Mike Evans was injured converting a crucial third down, but would return to the game after brief consolation with the trainers. Ryan Succop kicked a chip-shot field goal, and Tampa Bay led 3–0.

Early in the second quarter, the Rams were driving at their own 31 yard line. Stafford found Cooper Kupp in stride, who exploited a busted coverage. Kupp ran free for a 69-yard touchdown, and a 7–3 Rams lead. After the explosive score, neither team was able to get much going on offense. The Rams went three-and-out three times. Tampa Bay went three-and-out twice, then had a field goal attempt blocked. With 28 seconds left in the half, Succop's 38-yard field goal (his second of the game) made the score 7–6 at halftime.

The second half started with a three-and-out by the Buccaneers, followed by a field goal for the Rams. Tampa Bay's lone highlight of the quarter was Jake Camarda's 74-yard punt, which helped flip the field position. Facing a 4th & 2 at the LA 45, Brady was sacked and turned the ball over on downs. The turnover led to a 34-yard Cooper Kupp reception (down to the 10 yard line), followed by a Matt Gay field goal. Los Angeles led 13–6 at the end of the third quarter.

In the fourth quarter, Tampa Bay put together a 9-play, 30-yard drive. But a Holding penalty helped stall the drive, and they had to settle for a field goal attempt. Brady's 15-yard pass to Leonard Fournette at the 9:05 mark pushed him beyond 100,000 career passing yards. On the next play, Succop kicked a 52-yard field goal, and trimmed the deficit to 13–9.

The Tampa Bay defense forced a three-and-out, and the Buccaneers got the ball back at their own 41 with 5:43 to go. Brady swiftly moved the Buccaneers down field, including four quick passes to Scotty Miller, and had a 1st & Goal at the Los Angeles 7. On 2nd & Goal, Brady threw a strike to an open Miller in the back of the endzone. Miller jumped high to make the catch, but the ball hit his facemask and was dropped incomplete. Brady's pass attempt on 3rd & Goal intended for Cade Otton was swatted down at the goal line. That set up 4th & Goal at the 6. Brady was looking for Mike Evans in the endzone, but he was double covered and the pass fell incomplete, nearly intercepted by Jalen Ramsey. With two timeouts left, the Buccaneers turned the ball over on downs at the LA 6 yard line with 1:52 remaining.

The Tampa Bay defense needed a stop in order to get the ball back. Darrell Henderson was tackled for no gain on first down, and Tampa Bay used their second timeout. On 2nd & 10, Cooper Kupp took a handoff wide to the right side, and after a gain of only 5 yards, gave himself up by sliding to the grass. He managed to stay in bounds - forcing Tampa Bay to call their final timeout - but was spotted well short of the line to gain. On 3rd & 5, Henderson took a handoff up the middle, but was tackled after only a minimal gain. The Rams punted with 54 seconds left on the clock, and Jaelon Darden fielded the ball at the Tampa Bay 40.

Tom Brady found Cade Otton for a 28-yard gain on 1st down. Brady spiked the ball at the LA 32, then completed three quick sideline passes to advance the Buccaneers down to the 7 yard line. With 16 seconds left, Brady's pass to Mike Evans in the endzone was incomplete, but Derion Kendrick hooked his waist and drew a pass interference penalty. On 1st & Goal at the LA 1, Brady took a shotgun snap into a play-action, took two steps to his right, then threw to tight end Cade Otton on the right side. Otton jogged in nearly untouched for the game-winning touchdown with 9 seconds left.

==== Week 10: vs. Seattle Seahawks ====
NFL Germany games

Week 10: Seattle Seahawks at Tampa Bay Buccaneers – Game summary

Quarter	1	2	3	4	Total
Seahawks	0	0	3	13	**16**
**Buccaneers**	0	14	0	7	**21**

at Allianz Arena, Munich, Bavaria, Germany

- Date: November 13
- Game time: 3:30 p.m. CET/9:30 a.m. EST
- Game weather: Sunny, 48 °F (9 °C)
- Game attendance: 69,811
- Referee: John Hussey
- TV announcers (NFLN): Rich Eisen, Kurt Warner, Michael Irvin, Steve Mariucci, Jamie Erdahl and Sara Walsh
- Recap, Game Book

Game information

**First quarter**

- No scoring plays.

**Second quarter**

- TB – Julio Jones 31-yard pass from Tom Brady (Ryan Succop kick), 13:40. Buccaneers 7–0. **Drive: 13 plays, 88 yards, 6:32.**
- TB – Leonard Fournette 1-yard run (Ryan Succop kick), 4:31. Buccaneers 14–0. **Drive: 13 plays, 86 yards, 7:34.**

**Third quarter**

- SEA – Jason Myers 55-yard field goal, 12:05. Buccaneers 14–3. **Drive: 8 plays, 38 yards, 2:55.**

**Fourth quarter**

- TB – Chris Godwin 4-yard pass from Tom Brady (Ryan Succop kick), 10:48. Buccaneers 21–3. **Drive: 11 plays, 87 yards, 6:41.**
- SEA – Tyler Lockett 21-yard pass from Geno Smith (2-point pass failed), 8:20. Buccaneers 21–9. **Drive: 5 plays, 77 yards, 2:28.**
- SEA – Marquise Goodwin 19-yard pass from Geno Smith (Jason Myers kick), 3:58. Buccaneers 21–16. **Drive: 8 plays, 45 yards, 2:26.**

**Top passers**

- SEA – Geno Smith – 23/33, 275 yards, 2 TD
- TB – Tom Brady – 22/29, 258 yards, 2 TD, INT

**Top rushers**

- SEA – Geno Smith – 4 rushes, 22 yards
- TB – Rachaad White – 22 rushes, 105 yards

**Top receivers**

- SEA – DK Metcalf – 6 receptions, 71 yards
- TB – Chris Godwin – 6 receptions, 71 yards, TD

Running back Rachaad White rushed for 105 yards and Leonard Fournette put up 57 yards and one touchdown on the ground as Tampa Bay defeated Seattle 21–16 at the inaugural Munich Game. It was Tampa Bay's first win in four appearances in the NFL International Series, and the Buccaneers moved back into sole possession of first place in the NFC South. Linebacker Devin White led the defense, recording eight combined tackles, two sacks, a tackle for loss, three quarterback hits and a forced fumble, just days after the death of his father.

Seattle won the coin toss and elected to defer. Both teams went scoreless on their first two possessions. Tampa Bay had a three-and-out, and a missed field goal. Seattle punted both times, and the first quarter was scoreless. Tampa Bay was driving into Seahawks territory to start the second quarter. On 3rd & 10 at the Seattle 31, quarterback Tom Brady found Julio Jones wide open on a crossing route. Jones turned upfield and was met at the goal line, but absorbed the hit and managed to skirt inside the pylon for a 31-yard touchdown pass. Tampa Bay took a 7–0 lead. After another Seattle three-and-out, the Buccaneers got the ball back with 12:05 left in the half. Brady drove the Buccaneers 86 yards in 13 plays, notching six first downs. Brady connected to Chris Godwin for a 19-yard gain, then found a wide open Scotty Miller at the Seattle 5 yard line. Miller jumped high to make the catch, fell to the ground, bobbled the ball initially, then re-secured it for the reception. Two plays later, Leonard Fournette was in the endzone with a 1-yard touchdown run. Tampa Bay took a 14–0 lead into halftime.

The Seahawks got on the board in the third quarter, driving 38 yards in 8 plays. Jason Myers's 55-yard field goal made the score 14–3. On their next drive, Tampa Bay drove to the Seattle 22, highlighted by a one-handed catch by Chris Godwin. On 1st & 10 at the Seahawks 22, the Buccaneers turned the ball over on a busted trick play. Leonard Fournette lined up in the shotgun, took a couple steps to his right, then lofted a pass to Tom Brady, who had lined up as a wide receiver to the left. Brady slipped on the slick turf and fell down on the play, and the ball was intercepted by Tariq Woolen. Geno Smith subsequently drove the Seahawks down to the Tampa Bay 9 yard line. Facing 2nd & Goal at the 9, Smith came under pressure and was sacked by Devin White. The ball came loose and was recovered by Anthony Nelson to snuff out the drive. Tampa Bay continued to hold the lead at 14–3.

Rachaad White broke free for a 29-yard blast, stiff-arming and shoving down defender Quandre Diggs, moving Tampa Bay to the Seattle 43 yard line to start the fourth quarter. Brady's 4-yard touchdown pass to Chris Godwin stretched the lead to 21–3 with 10:48 to go. Smith threw two touchdown passes in the fourth quarter, narrowing the deficit to 21–16 with 3:58 left. Trailing by 5 points and with all three timeouts left, Seattle elected to kick off to Tampa Bay. The Buccaneers chewed up the clock, achieving three first downs on the drive, and did not let Seattle get the ball back. Coming out of the two-minute warning, with the crowd singing "Take Me Home, Country Roads", Rachaad White iced the game with a decisive 18-yard run. Brady took a knee to run out the clock, and Tampa Bay won 21–16.

==== Week 12: at Cleveland Browns ====
Week 12: Tampa Bay Buccaneers at Cleveland Browns – Game summary

Quarter	1	2	3	4	OT	Total
Buccaneers	7	3	7	0	0	**17**
**Browns**	10	0	0	7	6	**23**

at FirstEnergy Stadium, Cleveland, Ohio

- Date: November 27
- Game time: 1:00 p.m. EST
- Game weather: Rain, 56 °F (13 °C)
- Game attendance: 67,431
- Referee: Tra Blake
- TV announcers (Fox): Kenny Albert, Jonathan Vilma and Shannon Spake
- Recap, Game Book

Game information

**First quarter**

- CLE – Anthony Schwartz 31-yard run (Cade York kick), 10:45. Browns 7–0. **Drive: 7 plays, 78 yards, 4:15.**
- TB – Chris Godwin 10-yard pass from Tom Brady (Ryan Succop kick), 5:11. Tied 7–7. **Drive: 9 plays, 75 yards, 5:34.**
- CLE – Cade York 51-yard field goal, 2:22. Browns 10–7. **Drive: 7 plays, 42 yards, 2:49.**

**Second quarter**

- TB – Ryan Succop 42-yard field goal, 0:39. Tied 10–10. **Drive: 10 plays, 47 yards, 3:14.**

**Third quarter**

- TB – Ko Kieft 5-yard pass from Tom Brady (Ryan Succop kick), 7:41. Buccaneers 17–10. **Drive: 7 plays, 80 yards, 3:48.**

**Fourth quarter**

- CLE – David Njoku 12-yard pass from Jacoby Brissett (Cade York kick), 0:32. Tied 17–17. **Drive: 6 play, 46 yards, 1:38.**

**Overtime**

- CLE – Nick Chubb 3-yard run, 0:32. Browns 23–17. **Drive: 6 play, 71 yards, 2:26.**

**Top passers**

- TB – Tom Brady – 29/43, 246 yards, 2 TD
- CLE – Jacoby Brissett – 23/37, 210 yards, TD, INT

**Top rushers**

- TB – Rachaad White – 14 rushes, 64 yards
- CLE – Nick Chubb – 26 rushes, 116 yards, TD

**Top receivers**

- TB – Chris Godwin – 12 receptions, 110 yards, TD
- CLE – Amari Cooper – 7 receptions, 94 yards

Tampa Bay fell at Cleveland in overtime by the score of 23–17. Quarterback Tom Brady threw for 246 yards and two touchdown passes, but the Buccaneers were held scoreless in the fourth quarter, and could not score on two overtime drives. Tampa Bay fell to 5–6, but still maintained their lead in the NFC South.

Both teams scored touchdowns on their opening drives. Brady's 10-yard touchdown pass to Chris Godwin made the score 7–7 with 5:11 left in the first quarter. Cleveland added a field goal, then with 39 seconds left in the half, Ryan Succop's 42-yard field goal tied the score 10–10 at halftime.

In the third quarter, Tampa Bay drove 80 yards in 7 plays. A 28-yard reception by Mike Evans, followed by a 14-yard catch by Chris Godwin set up a 5-yard touchdown pass to Ko Kieft. Tampa Bay took a 17–10 lead midway through the third quarter. The Tampa Bay defense forced Cleveland into three punts and a turnover on downs over their next four drives.

Clinging to a 17–10 lead with 2:20 left in regulation, Tampa Bay punted from deep inside their own territory. Jacoby Brissett found David Njoku at the back of the endzone with 32 seconds left for a touchdown. Njoku's one-handed catch tied the score at 17–17. Tampa Bay had one last possession, but poor clock management prevented them from getting into field goal range. Brady found Julio Jones for a 26-yard gain down to the Cleveland 48, but since head coach Todd Bowles had chosen not to call a timeout prior to the play, they were left with only 8 seconds on the clock. The game went to overtime tied 17–17.

Tampa Bay won the coin toss and received. They crossed midfield, but the drive stalled due to a penalty, and they were forced to punt. After trading punts, Cleveland had the ball with 2:45 left in the overtime period. Brissett connected to Amari Cooper, who broke free for a 46-yard gain to the Tampa Bay 3. Two plays later, Nick Chubb punched the ball in for the game-winning touchdown for Cleveland.

==== Week 13: vs. New Orleans Saints ====
Week 13: New Orleans Saints at Tampa Bay Buccaneers – Game summary

Quarter	1	2	3	4	Total
Saints	0	10	3	3	**16**
**Buccaneers**	3	0	0	14	**17**

at Raymond James Stadium, Tampa, Florida

- Date: December 5
- Game time: 8:15 p.m. EST
- Game weather: Cloudy, 72 °F (22 °C)
- Game attendance: 68,709
- Referee: Clay Martin
- TV announcers (WFTS/ESPN): Joe Buck, Troy Aikman and Lisa Salters
- Recap, Game Book

Game information

**First quarter**

- TB – Ryan Succop 21-yard field goal, 6:25. Buccaneers 3–0. **Drive: 16 plays, 72 yards, 8:35.**

**Second quarter**

- NO – Taysom Hill 30-yard pass from Andy Dalton (Wil Lutz kick), 7:33. Saints 7–3. **Drive: 8 plays, 80 yards, 4:44.**
- NO – Wil Lutz 38-yard field goal, 0:20. Saints 10–3. **Drive: 6 plays, 30 yards, 1:07.**

**Third quarter**

- NO – Wil Lutz 21-yard field goal, 2:46. Saints 13–3. **Drive: 12 plays, 65 yards, 7:20.**

**Fourth quarter**

- NO – Wil Lutz 29-yard field goal, 8:02. Saints 16–3. **Drive: 12 plays, 69 yards, 6:51.**
- TB – Cade Otton 1-yard pass from Tom Brady (Ryan Succop kick), 3:00. Saints 16–10. **Drive: 10 plays, 91 yards, 2:21.**
- TB – Rachaad White 6-yard pass from Tom Brady (Ryan Succop kick), 0:03. Buccaneers 17–16. **Drive: 11 plays, 63 yards, 2:26.**

**Top passers**

- NO – Andy Dalton – 20/28, 229 yards, TD
- TB – Tom Brady – 36/54, 281 yards, 2 TD, INT

**Top rushers**

- NO – Mark Ingram – 7 rushes, 27 yards
- TB – Leonard Fournette – 10 rushes, 49 yards

**Top receivers**

- NO – Rashid Shaheed – 4 receptions, 75 yards
- TB – Chris Godwin – 8 receptions, 63 yards

Tampa Bay trailed 16–3 with just over three minutes left in the fourth quarter, then scored two touchdowns in the final three minutes to win 17–16. Quarterback Tom Brady found rookie running back Rachaad White for a 6-yard touchdown pass with 3 seconds left to lift the Buccaneers over the visiting Saints. Brady surpassed Peyton Manning with his 44th career fourth-quarter comeback, and extended his own record with his 56th game-winning drive (4th quarter or overtime). Brady also achieved his second career win after trailing by 13+ points with five minutes or less left in the fourth quarter of a game. Tampa Bay snapped a four-game home losing streak to rival New Orleans, and swept the season series for the first time since 2007.

Tampa Bay received the opening kickoff, and drove 72 yards in 16 plays. On 3rd & Goal at the 3 yard line. Brady's screen to Leonard Fournette was stopped for no gain. Ryan Succop kicked a chip-shot 21-yard field goal, and Tampa Bay took an early 3–0 lead.

Early in the second quarter, Brady threw deep to Scotty Miller, but the pass was broken up by Alontae Taylor. Two plays later, Brady tried to go deep to Julio Jones, but that ball was just out of his reach. New Orleans got on the board with an 8-play, 80-yard drive. Andy Dalton's 30-yard touchdown pass to Taysom Hill gave the Saints a 7–3 lead. With Tampa Bay driving near midfield inside the two-minute warning, Brady was intercepted by Demario Davis. The turnover led to a Wil Lutz field goal, and New Orleans led 10–3 at halftime.

Like much of the first half, the third quarter was filled with frustration for Tampa Bay. Rachaad White lost a fumble, and that turnover led to another Saints field goal. A promising drive late in the third stalled at the Saints 40. It was 4th & 7, and Jake Camarda punted for a touchback to start the fourth quarter (a net of only 20 yards).

Andy Dalton hit Chris Olave for a 26-yard gain on 3rd down & 3, then a pass interference call on Carlton Davis helped the Saints convert on another third down. Facing a 3rd & 2 at the 11, Dalton's pass to Alvin Kamara fell incomplete, tipped by Carl Nassib. The Saints settled for another field goal, and stretched their lead to 16–3 with 8:02 left in regulation.

On 1st & 10, Tom Brady was sacked for a loss of 7. A shovel pass to Rachaad White then gained back the lost yards. Tampa Bay faced 4th & 10 at their own 25 with 7:14 left when the Saints stopped the clock for an injury timeout. Brady insisted on going for it on fourth down, but was overruled by head coach Todd Bowles. The decision drew boos from the crowd. Jake Camarda's 45-yard punt was fielded by Rashid Shaheed who returned it 17 yards to the NO 47.

The Tampa Bay defense forced a three-and-out. After a short gain on first down, Mark Ingram caught a short pass to the right, but retreated out of bounds a yard short of the mark to make. Dalton's quick pass on 3rd & 1 went through the hands of Marquez Callaway, and the Saints punted. Tom Brady took over with 5:21 on the clock, and put together a 10-play, 91-yard scoring drive. After moving downfield with relative ease, a costly holding penalty on Donovan Smith pushed Tampa Bay back into a 2nd & 20 at the New Orleans 45. Brady then threw a deep bomb downfield to Mike Evans. What likely would have been a 45-yard touchdown reception was broken up at the goal line by Paulson Adebo, but Adebo was flagged for pass interference. The penalty gave the Buccaneers a 1st & Goal at the 1. Brady found Cade Otton in the right corner of the endzone for a touchdown, and cut the deficit to 16–10.

With 3:00 left in regulation, and still holding all three of their timeouts (plus the two-minute warning), Tampa Bay kicked off to New Orleans (touchback). Alvin Kamara took a handoff on first down for a 3-yard gain, and Tampa Bay took their first timeout. On second down, Andy Dalton was sacked by Carl Nassib for a loss of 10. Tampa Bay burned their second timeout, and the Saints faced 3rd & 17 at their own 18. Dalton threw a strike deep downfield to Taysom Hill, who made the grab at the 43, but as he came down, Jamel Dean and Keanu Neal converged on him, and Neal knocked it out of his hands incomplete. Blake Gillikin punted from inside the 5, and Tampa Bay took over at their own 40 with 2:29 left. Brady made quick completions to Jones, Godwin, and Otton, then Fournette's 10-yard handoff advanced Tampa Bay to the NO 31. Three plays later, Julio Jones made a leaping grab at the 5 yard line, setting up 1st & Goal. Brady found Godwin in the endzone with 16 seconds left, but the touchdown was negated due to another holding penalty on Donovan Smith. Three plays later, Brady found Rachaad White on a pivot route to the right, and White dove across the goal line to score with 3 seconds left. Ryan Succop, kicked the extra point, and Tampa Bay won the game 17–16, having never used their last timeout.

==== Week 14: at San Francisco 49ers ====
Week 14: Tampa Bay Buccaneers at San Francisco 49ers – Game summary

Quarter	1	2	3	4	Total
Buccaneers	0	0	7	0	**7**
**49ers**	7	21	7	0	**35**

at Levi's Stadium, Santa Clara, California

- Date: December 11
- Game time: 4:25 p.m. EST/1:25 p.m. PST
- Game weather: Cloudy, 54 °F (12 °C)
- Game attendance: 71,725
- Referee: Brad Allen
- TV announcers (Fox): Kevin Burkhardt, Greg Olsen and Erin Andrews
- Recap, Game Book

Game information

**First quarter**

- SF – Deebo Samuel 13-yard run (Robbie Gould kick), 12:26. 49ers 7–0. **Drive: 5 plays, 67 yards, 2:34.**

**Second quarter**

- SF – Brock Purdy 2-yard run (Robbie Gould kick), 14:55. 49ers 14–0. **Drive: 8 plays, 62 yards, 4:48.**
- SF – Christian McCaffrey 27-yard pass from Brock Purdy (Robbie Gould kick), 7:49. 49ers 21–0. **Drive: 9 plays, 71 yards, 5:21.**
- SF – Brandon Aiyuk 32-yard pass from Brock Purdy (Robbie Gould kick), 0:15. 49ers 28–0. **Drive: 7 plays, 91 yards, 2:14.**

**Third quarter**

- SF – Christian McCaffrey 38-yard run, 14:01. 49ers 35–0. **Drive: 2 plays, 38 yards, 0:12.**
- TB – Russell Gage 8-yard pass from Tom Brady (Ryan Succop kick), 2:48. 49ers 35–7. **Drive: 13 plays, 74 yards, 4:26.**

**Fourth quarter**

- No scoring plays

**Top passers**

- TB – Tom Brady – 34/55, 253 yards, TD, 2 INT
- SF – Brock Purdy – 16/21, 185 yards, 2 TD

**Top rushers**

- TB – Rachaad White – 13 rushes, 56 yards
- SF – Christian McCaffrey – 14 rushes, 119 yards, TD

**Top receivers**

- TB – Chris Godwin – 5 receptions, 54 yards
- SF – Brandon Aiyuk – 2 receptions, 57 yards, TD

Tampa Bay fell to San Francisco 35–7. Rookie quarterback Brock Purdy, who was Mr. Irrelevant, threw for 185 yards and two touchdown passes, and ran for one touchdown. Tampa Bay slipped to 6–7 on the season, but still maintained their lead in the NFC South.

On the first play of the game, Brock Purdy was sacked hard by a blitzing Keanu Neal, the result of a botched audible. However, Neal was flagged 15 yards for roughing the passer, and the 49ers were awarded a first down. Five plays later, Deebo Samuel was in the endzone for a touchdown, a lead the 49ers would never surrender.

Each of Tampa Bay's first half drives came up empty. Tom Brady threw a 68-yard touchdown pass to Mike Evans, but it was nullified by a holding penalty on Donovan Smith. Trailing 21–0 with 28 seconds left in the half, Anthony Nelson picked off Brock Purdy, but the interception was nullified by yet another penalty. One play later, Purdy connected with Brandon Aiyuk for a touchdown, and a 28–0 halftime lead.

Brady threw two interceptions in the second half. Tampa Bay avoided the shutout, with Brady throwing an 8-yard touchdown to Russell Gage in the third quarter.

==== Week 15: vs. Cincinnati Bengals ====
Week 15: Cincinnati Bengals at Tampa Bay Buccaneers – Game summary

Quarter	1	2	3	4	Total
**Bengals**	0	3	17	14	**34**
Buccaneers	3	14	0	6	**23**

at Raymond James Stadium, Tampa, Florida

- Date: December 18
- Game time: 4:25 p.m. EST
- Game weather: Clear, 67 °F (19 °C)
- Game attendance: 69,305
- Referee: Adrian Hill
- TV announcers (CBS): Jim Nantz, Tony Romo and Tracy Wolfson
- Recap, Game Book

Game information

**First quarter**

- TB – Ryan Succop 21-yard field goal, 6:06. Buccaneers 3–0. **Drive: 13 plays, 67 yards, 6:20.**

**Second quarter**

- TB – Russell Gage 1-yard pass from Tom Brady (Ryan Succop kick), 14:11. Buccaneers 10–0. **Drive: 11 plays, 59 yards, 4:47.**
- TB – Chris Godwin 5-yard pass from Tom Brady (Ryan Succop kick), 1:39. Buccaneers 17–0. **Drive: 10 plays, 85 yards, 4:51.**
- CIN – Evan McPherson 41-yard field goal, 0:00. Buccaneers 17–3. **Drive: 7 plays, 47 yards, 1:39.**

**Third quarter**

- CIN – Evan McPherson 21-yard field goal, 12:04. Buccaneers 17–6. **Drive: 5 plays, 13 yards, 1:27.**
- CIN – Tee Higgins 5-yard pass from Joe Burrow (pass failed), 5:42. Buccaneers 17–12. **Drive: 7 plays, 31 yards, 3:54.**
- CIN – Tyler Boyd 3-yard pass from Joe Burrow (Joe Burrow-Tee Higgins pass), 2:40. Bengals 20–17. **Drive: 5 plays, 13 yards, 2:16.**

**Fourth quarter**

- CIN – Ja'Marr Chase 8-yard pass from Joe Burrow (Evan McPherson kick), 12:45. Bengals 27–17. **Drive: 8 plays, 39 yards, 3:33.**
- CIN – Mitchell Wilcox 12-yard pass from Joe Burrow (Evan McPherson kick), 2:21. Bengals 34–17. **Drive: 13 plays, 62 yards, 6:57.**
- TB – Russell Gage 5-yard pass from Tom Brady (pass failed), 0:49. Bengals 34–23. **Drive: 9 plays, 75 yards, 1:32.**

**Top passers**

- CIN – Joe Burrow – 27/39, 200 yards, 4 TD, INT
- TB – Tom Brady – 30/44, 312 yards, 3 TD, 2 INT

**Top rushers**

- CIN – Samaje Perine – 7 rushes, 24 yards
- TB – Leonard Fournette – 10 rushes, 44 yards

**Top receivers**

- CIN – Ja'Marr Chase – 7 receptions, 60 yards, TD
- TB – Chris Godwin – 8 receptions, 83 yards, TD

Tampa Bay jumped out to a 17–0 lead over the Cincinnati Bengals, but faltered in the second half, and lost 34–23. Despite the loss (their third loss in four weeks), they maintained their lead in the weak NFC South.

Carlton Davis intercepted Joe Burrow on the fifth play of the game, setting up a Buccaneers field goal, and an early 3–0 lead. With Cincinnati's offense struggling in the first half, Tom Brady threw two touchdown passes in the second quarter (to Russell Gage and Chris Godwin), to make the score 17–0. The Bengals got on the board with a field goal as time expired in the half. Tampa Bay led 17–3 at halftime.

Tampa Bay fell apart in the second half. A botched fake punt led to a Cincinnati field goal. Tom Brady threw an interception, lost two fumbles, then threw another interception. The Bengals scored 34 unanswered points, and overpowered Tampa Bay en route to a 34–23 victory. Tampa Bay fell to 6–8, and Tom Brady notched his first loss after leading by 17+ points in a home game.

==== Week 16: at Arizona Cardinals ====
Christmas Day games

Week 16: Tampa Bay Buccaneers at Arizona Cardinals – Game summary

Quarter	1	2	3	4	OT	Total
**Buccaneers**	3	3	0	10	3	**19**
Cardinals	3	3	0	10	0	**16**

at State Farm Stadium, Glendale, Arizona

- Date: December 25
- Game time: 8:20 p.m. EST/6:20 p.m. MST
- Game weather: Clear, 69 °F (21 °C) (retractable roof open)
- Game attendance: 63,393
- Referee: John Hussey
- TV announcers (NBC): Mike Tirico, Cris Collinsworth and Melissa Stark
- Recap, Game Book

Game information

**First quarter**

- TB – Ryan Succop 38-yard field goal, 13:23. Buccaneers 3–0. **Drive: 5 plays, 55 yards, 1:37.**
- ARI – Matt Prater 56-yard field goal, 0:32. Tied 3–3. **Drive: 5 plays, 23 yards, 1:15.**

**Second quarter**

- TB – Ryan Succop 35-yard field goal, 8:14. Buccaneers 6–3. **Drive: 15 plays, 58 yards, 7:18.**
- ARI – Matt Prater 53-yard field goal, 0:08. Tied 6–6. **Drive: 9 plays, 35 yards, 0:59.**

**Third quarter**

- No scoring plays.

**Fourth quarter**

- ARI – Matt Prater 39-yard field goal, 14:07. Cardinals 9–6. **Drive: 9 plays, 60 yards, 4:01.**
- ARI – James Conner 22-yard run (Matt Prater kick), 10:47. Cardinals 16–6. **Drive: 5 plays, 33 yards, 1:39.**
- TB – Rachaad White 3-yard pass from Tom Brady (Ryan Succop kick), 8:03. Cardinals 16–13. **Drive: 7 plays, 67 yards, 2:44.**
- TB – Ryan Succop 42-yard field goal, 2:27. Tied 16–16. **Drive: 9 plays, 31 yards, 2:22.**

**Overtime**

- TB – Ryan Succop 40-yard field goal, 3:41. Buccaneers 19–16. **Drive: 9 plays, 66 yards, 4:02.**

**Top passers**

- TB – Tom Brady – 32/48, 281 yards, TD, 2 INT
- ARI – Trace McSorley – 24/45, 217 yards, INT

**Top rushers**

- TB – Leonard Fournette – 20 rushes, 72 yards
- ARI – James Conner – 15 rushes, 79 yards, TD

**Top receivers**

- TB – Leonard Fournette – 9 receptions, 90 yards
- ARI – Greg Dortch – 10 receptions, 98 yards

Tampa Bay visited Arizona on Sunday Night Football. It was the third game of a Christmas Day tripleheader, as well as Tampa Bay's first appearance on Christmas Day. The Buccaneers overcame two turnovers and a 10-point fourth quarter deficit, to force overtime. Ryan Succop, 4-for-4 on the night, kicked the game-winning field goal in overtime, and Tampa Bay won 19–16. The Buccaneers snapped a two-game losing streak, won their first road game since Week 2, and kept their lead in the NFC South.

Tampa Bay took the opening kickoff and drove 55 yards in 5 plays for the first score. Quarterback Tom Brady missed Julio Jones in the endzone, and had to settle for a Ryan Succop field goal. Back-up quarterback Trace McSorley started for Arizona, his first career start. Facing 3rd & 6 at the Tampa Bay 13, McSorley was sacked on a blindside blitz by Anthony Nelson and fumbled away the ball.

Tampa Bay was driving to start the second quarter. Brady found Julio Jones for a 10-yard touchdown pass, but it was nullified due to a penalty. They once again had to settle for a field goal, and took a 6–3 lead. After a Cardinals three-and-out, Tampa Bay got the ball near midfield. Brady's bomb to Mike Evans was intercepted at the 2-yard line by Marco Wilson, snuffing out another touchdown opportunity. With 4 seconds left in the half, Matt Prater's 53-yard field goal attempt bounced off the upright and fell in good. The score was tied 6–6 at halftime.

Neither team was able to get much going on offense during a scoreless third quarter. Tom Brady threw his second interception of the night. Marco Wilson picked off Brady on another pass intended for Mike Evans. Five plays later, Trace McSorley went deep to Marquise Brown for a 47-yard gain, down to the Tampa Bay 20. The Buccaneers defense stiffened, and a minute into the fourth quarter, Prater kicked his third field goal. Arizona had their first lead of the night at 9–6.

Tampa Bay went three-and-out and punted right back to Arizona. Pharoh Cooper's 28-yard return set the Cardinals up at the Tampa Bay 33. James Connor burned the defense with a 22-yard touchdown run. Arizona led 16–6 with only 10:47 left in regulation.

Leonard Fournette sparked the Tampa Bay offense to life. A 44-yard catch and run screen pass set the Buccaneers up at the Cardinals 23. Brady's 3-yard touchdown pass to Rachaad White cut the score to 16–13 with 8:03 to go. On their next drive, Arizona faced a 3rd & 1 at the Tampa Bay 42 with 4:53 left. McSorley's pitch to Keaontay Ingram was fumbled away and recovered by William Gholston. The turnover led to a Buccaneers field goal and a 16–16 tie.

The game went to overtime tied 16–16. Arizona won the coin toss and received. They achieved one first down, but were ultimately forced to punt. Brady drove Tampa Bay 66 yards in 9 plays for the game winning score. Crucial pass completions to Russell Gage and Mike Evans set up a 40-yard game-winning field goal by Ryan Succop.

==== Week 17: vs. Carolina Panthers ====
Week 17: Carolina Panthers at Tampa Bay Buccaneers – Game summary

Quarter	1	2	3	4	Total
Panthers	7	7	0	10	**24**
**Buccaneers**	0	10	0	20	**30**

at Raymond James Stadium, Tampa, Florida

- Date: January 1
- Game time: 1:00 p.m. EST
- Game weather: Cloudy, 73 °F (23 °C)
- Game attendance: 69,298
- Referee: Brad Rogers
- TV announcers (Fox): Kevin Burkhardt, Greg Olsen, Erin Andrews and Tom Rinaldi
- Recap, Game Book

Game information

**First quarter**

- CAR – Tommy Tremble 17-yard pass from Sam Darnold (Eddy Piñeiro kick), 11:39. Panthers 7–0. **Drive: 6 plays, 75 yards, 3:21.**

**Second quarter**

- CAR – D. J. Moore 24-yard pass from Sam Darnold (Eddy Piñeiro kick), 7:51. Panthers 14–0. **Drive: 8 plays, 57 yards, 4:09.**
- TB – Mike Evans 63-yard pass from Tom Brady (Ryan Succop kick), 2:10. Panthers 14–7. **Drive: 4 plays, 80 yards, 0:52.**
- TB – Ryan Succop 22-yard field goal, 1:09. Panthers 14–10. **Drive: 4 plays, 9 yards, 0:48.**

**Third quarter**

- No scoring plays.

**Fourth quarter**

- CAR – Shi Smith 19-yard pass from Sam Darnold (Eddy Piñeiro kick), 14:50. Panthers 21–10. **Drive: 7 plays, 91 yards, 3:47.**
- TB – Mike Evans 57-yard pass from Tom Brady (pass failed), 13:49. Panthers 21–16. **Drive: 3 plays, 75 yards, 1:01.**
- TB – Mike Evans 30-yard pass from Tom Brady (Tom Brady-Chris Godwin pass), 6:47. Buccaneers 24–21. **Drive: 8 plays, 92 yards, 3:06.**
- TB – Tom Brady 1-yard run (kick failed), 1:58. Buccaneers 30–21. **Drive: 2 plays, 6 yards, 0:26.**
- CAR – Eddy Piñeiro 49-yard field goal, 0:59. Buccaneers 30–24. **Drive: 8 plays, 44 yards, 0:59.**

**Top passers**

- CAR – Sam Darnold – 23/37, 341 yards, 3 TD, INT
- TB – Tom Brady – 34/45, 432 yards, 3 TD

**Top rushers**

- CAR – D'Onta Foreman – 13 rushes, 35 yards
- TB – Leonard Fournette – 10 rushes, 28 yards

**Top receivers**

- CAR – D. J. Moore – 6 receptions, 117 yards, TD
- TB – Mike Evans – 10 receptions, 207 yards, 3 TD

Quarterback Tom Brady threw for 432 yards, rushed for a touchdown, and threw three touchdown passes to Mike Evans. The Buccaneers defeated Carolina 30–24 and clinched the NFC South title. Evans extended his own record, becoming the first wide receiver in NFL history with 1,000+ receiving yards in each of his first nine seasons. The Buccaneers once again rallied from a double-digit deficit, trailing by as many as 14 points in the first half, then later erasing an 11-point fourth quarter deficit to take the victory.

Carolina took an early 7–0 lead with a 17-yard touchdown pass from Sam Darnold to Tommy Tremble. Tampa Bay's first drive ended with a fumble by Chris Godwin in Carolina territory. After the turnover, the Tampa Bay defense forced a three-and-out. Carolina led 7–0 at the end of the first quarter.

Tampa Bay was driving into Carolina territory to start the second quarter. A 14-play drive of over six minutes came up empty, as Ryan Succop missed a 53-yard goal attempt. Sam Darnold found D. J. Moore for a 24-yard touchdown pass, and the Panthers extended their lead to 14–0. Tampa Bay got the ball with just over 3 minutes left in the half, and finally got points on the board. Brady found Mike Evans in stride for a 63-yard touchdown pass, Evan's first since Week 3. On the ensuing drive, Darnold fumbled away a bad snap, and Devin White recovered the ball at the Carolina 13. Succop kicked a 22-yard field goal, and Carolina led 14–10 at halftime.

The third quarter was scoreless for both teams. Sam Darnold went deep to Stephen Sullivan, but the ball was intercepted at the 2 yard line by Sean Murphy-Bunting. Starting at their own 2, Tampa Bay put together a 15-play, 90-yard drive, taking over seven minutes off of the clock. For the second time, however, a long drive came up empty as Carolina blocked Succop's 26-yard field goal attempt.

After the blocked field goal, Carolina drove 91 yards in 7 plays. Shi Smith's 19-yard touchdown catch put the Panthers up by 11 with 14:50 left. Less than a minute later, Brady connected to Mike Evans deep for a 57-yard touchdown, his second big touchdown of the day. After a failed two-point conversion, the score was 21–16 in favor of Carolina. The Tampa Bay defense forced a Carolina punt, and the Buccaneers offense got the ball back at their own 8 yard line with 9:53 left. Brady drove the Buccaneers 92 yards in 8 plays for the go-ahead score. Brady found Evans for a 30-yard touchdown, his third of the game. Tampa Bay led 24–21 with under 7 minutes remaining.

The two teams traded punts, and Carolina got the ball with 2:32 to go at their own 13. Anthony Nelson sacked Sam Darnold, forcing a fumble. Nelson recovered the loose ball at the 6 yard line. Two plays later, Brady was in the endzone with a 1-yard QB sneak. Tampa Bay took a 30–21 lead at the two-minute warning. Carolina managed a field goal and cut the lead to 30–24. After a failed onside kick, Carolina had one last possession with 26 seconds to go. A hook and lateral failed to score, and Tampa Bay held on for the victory.

==== Week 18: at Atlanta Falcons ====
Week 18: Tampa Bay Buccaneers at Atlanta Falcons – Game summary

Quarter	1	2	3	4	Total
Buccaneers	7	10	0	0	**17**
**Falcons**	10	0	10	10	**30**

at Mercedes-Benz Stadium, Atlanta, Georgia

- Date: January 8
- Game time: 1:00 p.m. EST
- Game weather: None (retractable roof closed)
- Game attendance: 69,276
- Referee: Land Clark
- TV announcers (Fox): Adam Amin, Mark Schlereth and Kristina Pink
- Recap, Game Book

Game information

**First quarter**

- TB – Kyle Rudolph 8-yard pass from Tom Brady (Ryan Succop kick), 9:47. Buccaneers 7–0. **Drive: 10 plays, 70 yards, 5:13.**
- ATL – MyCole Pruitt 2-yard pass from Desmond Ridder (Younghoe Koo kick), 3:22. Tied 7–7. **Drive: 9 plays, 91 yards, 4:00.**
- ATL – Younghoe Koo 49-yard field goal, 0:54. Falcons 10–7. **Drive: 4 plays, 3 yards, 1:36.**

**Second quarter**

- TB – Ryan Succop 41-yard field goal, 8:15. Tied 10–10. **Drive: 14 plays, 52 yards, 7:39.**
- TB – Russell Gage 3-yard pass from Blaine Gabbert (Ryan Succop kick), 1:46. Buccaneers 17–10. **Drive: 5 plays, 22 yards, 2:14.**

**Third quarter**

- ATL – Younghoe Koo 24-yard field goal, 10:27. Buccaneers 17–13. **Drive: 9 plays, 69 yards, 4:33.**
- ATL – Olamide Zaccheaus 3-yard pass from Desmond Ridder (Younghoe Koo kick), 0:51. Falcons 20–17. **Drive: 14 plays, 80 yards, 7:58.**

**Fourth quarter**

- ATL – Cordarrelle Patterson 2-yard run (Younghoe Koo kick), 8:07. Falcons 27–17. **Drive: 9 plays, 83 yards, 6:04.**
- ATL – Younghoe Koo 51-yard field goal, 4:00. Falcons 30–17. **Drive: 10 plays, 42 yards, 3:10.**

**Top passers**

- TB – Tom Brady – 13/17, 84 yards, TD
- ATL – Desmond Ridder – 19/30, 224 yards, 2 TD

**Top rushers**

- TB – Giovani Bernard – 7 rushes, 28 yards
- ATL – Tyler Allgeier – 24 rushes, 125 yards

**Top receivers**

- TB – Chris Godwin – 6 receptions, 55 yards
- ATL – Drake London – 6 receptions, 120 yards

Tampa Bay faced Atlanta in their regular season finale. Going into the game, the Buccaneers - winners of the NFC South a week earlier - were locked into the fourth seed in the NFC for the playoffs, rendering this game largely inconsequential. Quarterback Tom Brady started the game, playing in the first quarter, and part of the second quarter. On the opening drive, Brady drove the Buccaneers 70 yards in 10 plays. An 8-yard touchdown pass to Kyle Rudolph gave Tampa Bay an early 7–0 lead.

Blaine Gabbert took over at quarterback with 4 minutes left in the second quarter. Gabbert threw a 3-yard touchdown pass to Russell Gage, giving Tampa Bay a 17–10 halftime lead.

In the second half, Atlanta pulled away for a 30–17 victory. The Buccaneers benched their starters and put third-string quarterback Kyle Trask in to finish the game. During his partial stint, Tom Brady broke his own NFL record for most pass completions in a single season (490). With the loss, Tampa Bay became the fourth team in NFL history to make the playoffs with a losing record, Brady finished with his first career losing record, and Brady also lost his first game against Atlanta in twelve meetings.

=== Standings ===
==== Division ====
NFC South
	W	L	T	PCT	DIV	CONF	PF	PA	STK
^{(4)} Tampa Bay Buccaneers	8	9	0	.471	4–2	8–4	313	358	L1
Carolina Panthers	7	10	0	.412	4–2	6–6	347	374	W1
New Orleans Saints	7	10	0	.412	2–4	5–7	330	345	L1
Atlanta Falcons	7	10	0	.412	2–4	6–6	365	386	W2

==== Conference ====
NFC
#	Team	Division	W	L	T	PCT	DIV	CONF	SOS	SOV	STK
**Division leaders**
1	Philadelphia Eagles	East	14	3	0	.824	4–2	9–3	.474	.460	W1
2 (Note: San Francisco claimed the No. 2 seed over Minnesota based on conference record (10–2 vs. 8–4).)	San Francisco 49ers	West	13	4	0	.765	6–0	10–2	.417	.414	W10
3	Minnesota Vikings	North	13	4	0	.765	4–2	8–4	.474	.425	W1
4	Tampa Bay Buccaneers	South	8	9	0	.471	4–2	8–4	.503	.426	L1
**Wild cards**
5	Dallas Cowboys	East	12	5	0	.706	4–2	8–4	.507	.485	L1
6	New York Giants	East	9	7	1	.559	1–4–1	4–7–1	.526	.395	L1
7 (Note: Seattle finished ahead of Detroit based on head-to-head victory, claiming the 7th and final playoff spot.)	Seattle Seahawks	West	9	8	0	.529	4–2	6–6	.462	.382	W2
**Did not qualify for the postseason**
8	Detroit Lions	North	9	8	0	.529	5–1	7–5	.535	.451	W2
9	Washington Commanders	East	8	8	1	.500	2–3–1	5–6–1	.536	.449	W1
10	Green Bay Packers	North	8	9	0	.471	3–3	6–6	.524	.449	L1
11 (Note: Carolina finished ahead of New Orleans and Atlanta based on head-to-head record (3–1 vs. 2–2/1–3).)	Carolina Panthers	South	7	10	0	.412	4–2	6–6	.474	.437	W1
12 (Note: New Orleans finished ahead of Atlanta based on head-to-head sweep.)	New Orleans Saints	South	7	10	0	.412	2–4	5–7	.507	.462	L1
13	Atlanta Falcons	South	7	10	0	.412	2–4	6–6	.467	.429	W2
14	Los Angeles Rams	West	5	12	0	.294	1–5	3–9	.517	.341	L2
15	Arizona Cardinals	West	4	13	0	.235	1–5	3–9	.529	.368	L7
16	Chicago Bears	North	3	14	0	.176	0–6	1–11	.571	.480	L10
**Tiebreakers** (Note: When breaking ties for three or more teams under the NFL's rules, they are first broken within divisions, then comparing only the highest-ranked remaining team from each division.)

== Postseason ==
=== Schedule ===
Round	Date	Opponent (seed)	Result	Record	Venue	Recap
Wild Card	January 16	Dallas Cowboys (5)	L 14–31	0–1	Raymond James Stadium	Recap

=== Game summaries ===
==== NFC Wild Card Playoffs: vs. (5) Dallas Cowboys ====
NFC Wild Card Playoffs: (5) Dallas Cowboys at (4) Tampa Bay Buccaneers – Game summary

Quarter	1	2	3	4	Total
Cowboys	6	12	6	7	31
Buccaneers	0	0	6	8	14

at Raymond James Stadium, Tampa, Florida

- Date: January 16, 2023
- Game time: 8:15 p.m. EST
- Game weather: Clear, 56 °F (13 °C)
- Game attendance: 69,145
- Referee: Craig Wrolstad
- TV announcers (ABC/ESPN): Joe Buck, Troy Aikman, and Lisa Salters
- Recap, Game Book

Game information

First quarter

- DAL – Dalton Schultz 22-yard pass from Dak Prescott (Brett Maher kick wide right), 6:28. Cowboys 6–0. Drive: 7 plays, 80 yards, 3:32.

Second quarter

- DAL – Dak Prescott 1-yard rush (Brett Maher kick wide right), 6:13. Cowboys 12–0. Drive: 15 plays, 80 yards, 8:38.
- DAL – Dalton Schultz 11-yard pass from Dak Prescott (Brett Maher kick wide left), 0:27. Cowboys 18–0. Drive: 11 plays, 91 yards, 3:05.

Third quarter

- DAL – Michael Gallup 2-yard pass from Dak Prescott (Brett Maher kick hit right upright), 10:04. Cowboys 24–0. Drive: 8 plays, 86 yards, 4:07.
- TB – Julio Jones 30-yard pass from Tom Brady (Tom Brady-Chris Godwin pass incomplete), 0:00. Cowboys 24–6. Drive: 10 plays, 95 yards, 3:09.

Fourth quarter

- DAL – CeeDee Lamb 18-yard pass from Dak Prescott (Brett Maher kick), 10:13. Cowboys 31–6. Drive: 9 plays, 66 yards, 4:47.
- TB – Cameron Brate 8-yard pass from Tom Brady (Tom Brady-Mike Evans pass), 2:04. Cowboys 31–14. Drive: 11 plays, 52 yards, 2:39.

Top passers

- DAL – Dak Prescott – 25/33, 305 yards, 4 TD
- TB – Tom Brady – 35/66, 351 yards, 2 TD, 1 INT

Top rushers

- DAL – Tony Pollard – 15 rushes, 77 yards
- TB – Rachaad White – 7 rushes, 41 yards

Top receivers

- DAL – Dalton Schultz – 7 receptions, 95 yards, 2 TD
- TB – Chris Godwin – 10 receptions, 85 yards

In a reversal of Week 1, the Buccaneers struggled to find answers to the Cowboys defense that held the Buccaneers to just 14 points. As the Buccaneers tried to respond to the Cowboys striking first, Tom Brady threw a costly red-zone interception, which gave the ball back to the Cowboys and the Buccaneers defense began to struggle. The Buccaneers gave up two more touchdowns and were forced to punt for the majority of the game. As the Buccaneers trailed 18–0 at halftime, they were forced to punt again to begin the second half, and proceeded to allow another touchdown scoring drive to the Cowboys to make the game 24–0 in the Cowboys favor. The Buccaneers got on the board after Tom Brady threw a touchdown pass to Julio Jones, but failed the two-point conversion attempt. While Cowboys' kicker Brett Maher missed the first four extra points, Maher made the last one to make the game 31–6 in the Cowboys' favor. In the final minutes of the game, the Buccaneers scored their last touchdown of 2022 via a Tom Brady pass to Cameron Brate, but the outcome was already decided in favor of the Cowboys. To make matters worse for Tampa Bay amid their season-ending loss, wide receiver Russell Gage was carted off with an injury to his neck and back and was hospitalized. The loss ensured Tom Brady would not finish his career undefeated against the Cowboys and dropped him to 7–1 as a starter against Dallas. This was the first Buccaneers loss in the first round of the playoffs since a 24–14 loss in the 2007 Wild Card round to the New York Giants, who would coincidentally go on to defeat Brady himself in Super Bowl XLII. This was also Tom Brady's final NFL game, as he announced his final retirement on February 1, 2023.

== Awards ==
- NFC Offensive Player of the week
  - Week 17: Mike Evans
- NFC Defensive Player of the week
  - Week 10: Devin White
- NFC Special Teams Player of the week
  - Week 9: Jake Camarda
- NFC Defensive Player of the month
  - September: Devin White
- FedEx Air Player of the Week
  - Week 17: Tom Brady
