= Cade Otton =

American football player (born 1999)

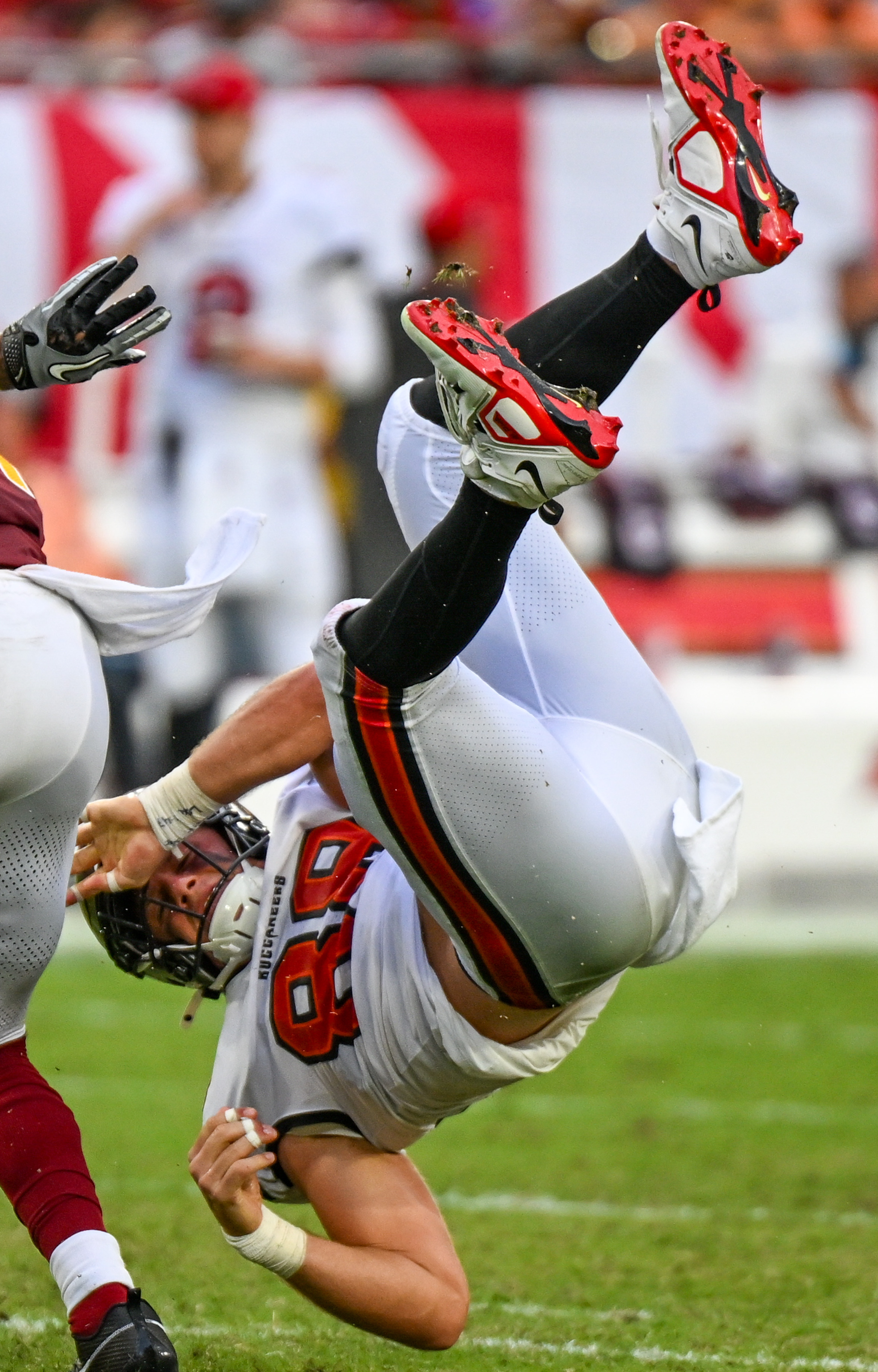
- Otton with the Tampa Bay Buccaneers in 2024

No. 88 – Tampa Bay Buccaneers
- Position: Tight end
- Roster status: Active

Personal information
- Born: April 15, 1999 (age 27); Tumwater, Washington, U.S.
- Listed height: 6 ft 5 in (1.96 m)
- Listed weight: 247 lb (112 kg)

Career information
- High school: Tumwater (WA)
- College: Washington (2017–2021)
- NFL draft: 2022: 4th round, 106th overall pick

Career history
- Tampa Bay Buccaneers (2022–present)

Awards and highlights
- First-team All-Pac-12 (2020)

Career NFL statistics as of 2025
- Receptions: 207
- Receiving yards: 2,018
- Receiving touchdowns: 11
- Stats at Pro Football Reference

Cade Otton (born April 15, 1999) is an American professional football tight end for the Tampa Bay Buccaneers of the National Football League (NFL). He previously played college football for the Washington Huskies before being selected by the Buccaneers in the fourth round of the 2022 NFL draft.

== Early life ==
Otton attended Tumwater High School in Tumwater, Washington. As a senior he was The Olympian’s All-Area Football Player of the Year after recording 39 receptions for 733 yards with 13 touchdowns on offense and 107 tackles and three sacks on defense. He committed to the University of Washington to play college football.

== College career ==
After redshirting his first year at Washington in 2017, Otton played in all 14 games with 10 starts in 2018. He finished the year with 13 receptions for 174 yards and three touchdowns. As a sophomore in 2019, he started all 13 games, recording 32 receptions for 344 yards and two touchdowns. As a junior in 2020, he started all four games and had 18 receptions for 258 yards and three touchdowns. Otton returned to Washington for his senior year in 2021 rather than enter the 2021 NFL draft.

== Professional career ==
Pre-draft measurables
Height	Weight	Arm length	Hand span	Wingspan	20-yard shuttle	Vertical jump	Bench press	Wonderlic
6 ft 5 in (1.96 m)	247 lb (112 kg)	32 3/4 in (0.83 m)	9 1/2 in (0.24 m)	6 ft 7 1/2 in (2.02 m)	4.52 s	32 in (0.81 m)	17 reps	36
All values from NFL Combine/Pro Day

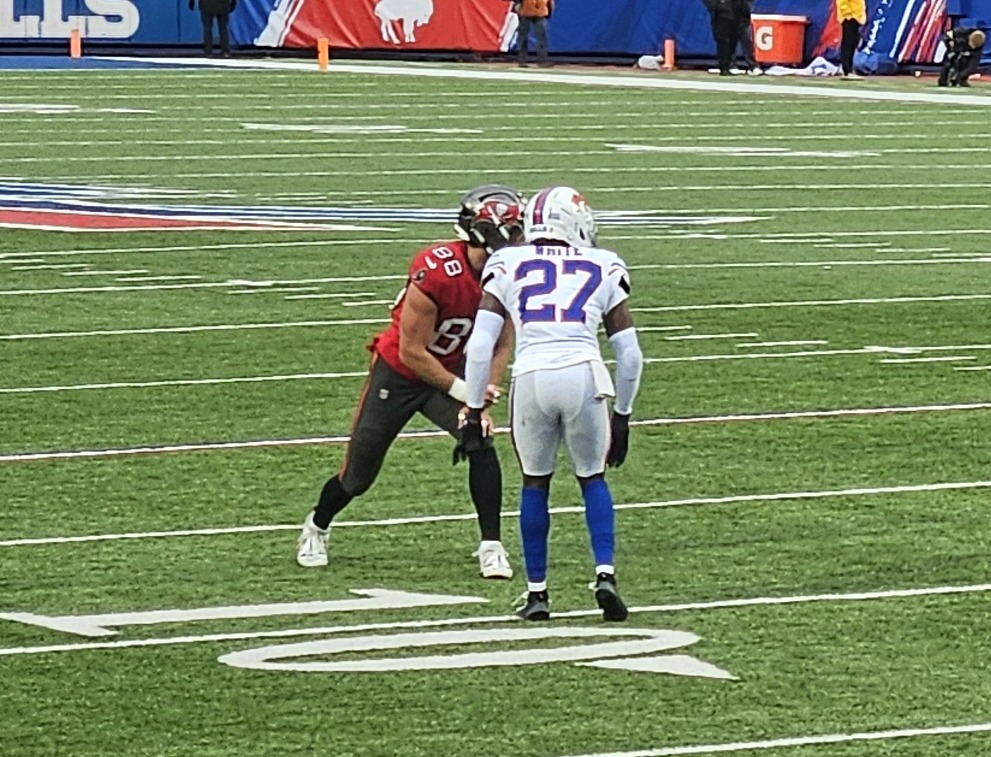
Otton lined up against Tre'Davious White of the Buffalo Bills in 2025

Otton was selected by the Tampa Bay Buccaneers in the fourth round, 106th overall, of the 2022 NFL draft.

In Week 9, Otton caught the game-winning touchdown from Tom Brady in a 16–13 victory over the Los Angeles Rams. Otton finished his rookie season with 42 receptions for 391 receiving yards and two receiving touchdowns in 16 games and 11 starts.

In the 2023 season, Otton finished with 47 receptions for 455 yards and four touchdowns in 17 games.

In the 2024 season, Otton finished his third year with a career high 59 receptions and 600 yards, along with four touchdowns in the 14 games he played.

On March 12, 2026, Otton re-signed with the Buccaneers on a three-year, $30 million contract.

== NFL career statistics ==
Legend
**Bold**	Career high

=== Regular season ===
Year	Team	Games		Receiving					Rushing					Fumbles	
Year	Team	GP	GS	Rec	Yds	Avg	Lng	TD	Att	Yds	Avg	Lng	TD	Fum	Lost
2022	TB	16	11	42	391	9.3	35	2	0	**0**	**0.0**	**0**	0	0	0
2023	TB	17	17	47	455	9.7	27	**4**	0	**0**	**0.0**	**0**	0	1	1
2024	TB	14	14	**59**	**600**	**10.2**	**44**	4	**1**	-4	-4.0	-4	0	2	1
2025	TB	16	16	**59**	572	9.7	27	1	0	**0**	**0.0**	**0**	0	0	0
2026	TB	6	6	19	186	9.8	37	0	0	0	0	0	0	1	0
Career		69	64	227	2,204	9.8	44	11	1	-4	-4.0	-4	0	3	2

=== Postseason ===
Year	Team	Games		Receiving					Rushing					Fumbles	
Year	Team	GP	GS	Rec	Yds	Avg	Lng	TD	Att	Yds	Avg	Lng	TD	Fum	Lost
2022	TB	1	1	4	58	14.5	17	0	0	0	0.0	0	0	0	0
2023	TB	2	2	**13**	**154**	11.8	**27**	**1**	0	0	0.0	0	0	0	0
2024	TB	1	1	2	32	**16.0**	20	0	0	0	0.0	0	0	0	0
Career		4	4	19	244	12.8	27	1	0	0	0.0	0	0	0	0

== Personal life ==
Otton married Sierra Snyder in 2021. Otton is the nephew of Brad Otton. Cade also has a brother who currently played for the Washington Huskies named Ryan Otton.
