= Logan Hall =

American football player (born 2000)

No. 96 – Houston Texans
- Position: Defensive tackle
- Roster status: Active

Personal information
- Born: April 22, 2000 (age 26); Elgin, Oklahoma, U.S.
- Listed height: 6 ft 6 in (1.98 m)
- Listed weight: 283 lb (128 kg)

Career information
- High school: Belton (Belton, Texas)
- College: Houston (2018–2021)
- NFL draft: 2022: 2nd round, 33rd overall pick

Career history
- Tampa Bay Buccaneers (2022–2025); Houston Texans (2026–present)

Awards and highlights
- First-team All-AAC (2021)

Career NFL statistics as of Week 7, 2026
- Total tackles: 111
- Sacks: 11
- Forced fumbles: 1
- Fumble recoveries: 3
- Pass deflections: 4
- Stats at Pro Football Reference

Logan Hall (born April 22, 2000) is an American professional football defensive tackle for the Houston Texans of the National Football League (NFL). He previously played college football for the Houston Cougars before being selected by the Tampa Bay Buccaneers in the second round of the 2022 NFL draft.

== Early life ==
Hall originally grew up in Elgin, Oklahoma, before moving to Belton, Texas, and transferred to Belton High School for his final two years of high school. He was named first-team All-District as a senior after recording 54 tackles and ten tackles for loss. Hall was rated a three-star recruit and committed to play college football at Houston over offers from Colorado State, Toledo, and Tulsa.

== College career ==
Hall was a member of the Houston Cougars for four seasons. He was a member of the Cougars' defensive line rotation as a freshman and sophomore. Hall became a starter going into his junior season. Hall was named first-team All-American Athletic Conference as a senior after recording 13 tackles for loss and six sacks.

=== College statistics ===
Year	Team	GP	Tackles					Interceptions					Fumbles			
Year	Team	GP	Solo	Ast	Total	Loss	Sack	Int	Yards	Avg	TD	PD	FR	Yards	TD	FF
2018	Houston	8	9	5	14	3.0	0.0	0	0	0.0	0	0	0	0	0	1
2019	Houston	7	8	5	13	1.5	0.5	0	0	0.0	0	0	0	0	0	0
2020	Houston	7	9	14	23	2.0	1.0	0	0	0.0	0	1	0	0	0	0
2021	Houston	12	24	23	47	13.0	6.0	0	0	0.0	0	0	0	0	0	0

== Professional career ==
Pre-draft measurables
Height	Weight	Arm length	Hand span	Wingspan	40-yard dash	10-yard split	20-yard split	20-yard shuttle	Three-cone drill	Vertical jump	Broad jump	Bench press
6 ft 6 1/8 in (1.98 m)	283 lb (128 kg)	32 3/4 in (0.83 m)	9 5/8 in (0.24 m)	6 ft 7 1/8 in (2.01 m)	4.88 s	1.73 s	2.84 s	4.44 s	7.25 s	30.0 in (0.76 m)	8 ft 9 in (2.67 m)	25 reps
All values from NFL Combine/Houston Pro Day

=== Tampa Bay Buccaneers ===
Hall was selected by the Tampa Bay Buccaneers in the second round (33rd overall) of the 2022 NFL draft. In Week 3, against the Green Bay Packers, he recorded his first NFL sack on Aaron Rodgers.

=== Houston Texans ===
On March 13, 2026, Hall signed a two-year, $14 million contract with the Houston Texans.

== NFL career statistics ==
Legend
**Bold**	Career high

=== Regular season ===
Year	Team	Games		Tackles					Interceptions						Fumbles				
Year	Team	GP	GS	Cmb	Solo	Ast	Sck	TFL	Int	Yds	Avg	Lng	TD	PD	FF	Fmb	FR	Yds	TD
2022	TB	17	0	12	7	5	2.5	5	0	0	0.0	0	0	0	0	0	0	0	0
2023	TB	16	13	22	11	11	0.5	2	0	0	0.0	0	0	**2**	0	0	**2**	0	0
2024	TB	16	10	28	17	11	**5.5**	**6**	0	0	0.0	0	0	1	0	0	1	0	0
2025	TB	17	16	**39**	**18**	**21**	1.5	2	0	0	0.0	0	0	1	**1**	0	0	0	0
Career		66	39	101	53	48	10.0	15	0	0	0.0	0	0	4	1	0	3	0	0

=== Postseason ===
Year	Team	Games		Tackles					Interceptions						Fumbles				
Year	Team	GP	GS	Cmb	Solo	Ast	Sck	TFL	Int	Yds	Avg	Lng	TD	PD	FF	Fmb	FR	Yds	TD
2022	TB	1	0	1	0	1	0.0	0	0	0	0.0	0	0	0	0	0	0	0	0
2023	TB	2	2	2	2	0	0.0	0	0	0	0.0	0	0	0	0	0	0	0	0
2024	TB	1	1	**7**	**5**	**2**	0.0	0	0	0	0.0	0	0	0	0	0	0	0	0
Career		4	3	10	7	3	0.0	0	0	0	0.0	0	0	0	0	0	0	0	0
