= Holding (American football) =

Type of penalty in American football

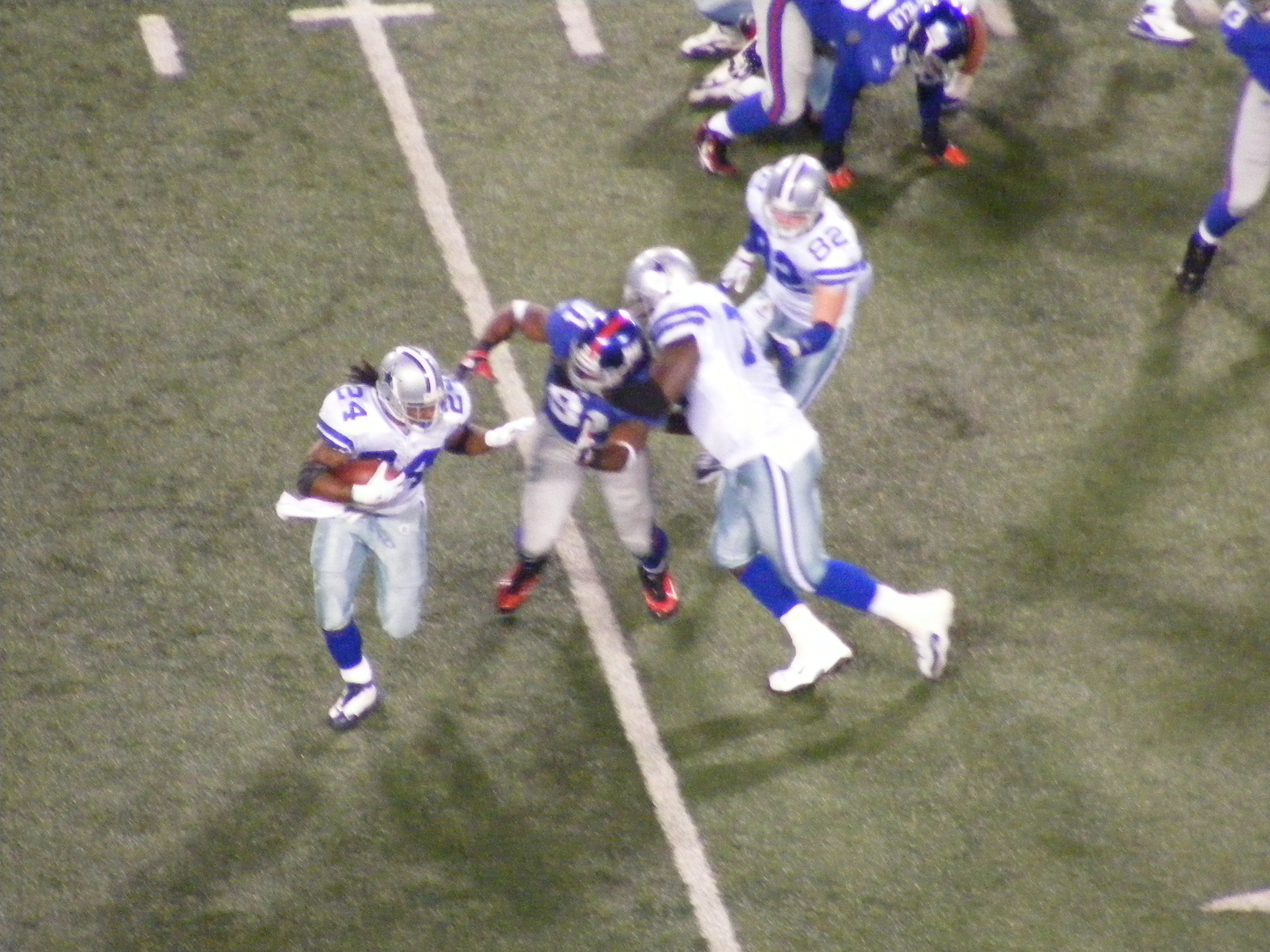
Leonard Davis holding Justin Tuck, preventing him from tackling Marion Barber III during a game in 2008

In gridiron football, holding is the illegal use of the hand or arm to restrain another player who is not in possession of the ball. Holding is prohibited in most football leagues because it does not allow fair play of the game and increases the risk for injury. It is one of the most common penalties in American football.

While in the field of play, offensive holding results in a 10-yard penalty, or half the distance to the goal line when there are fewer than 20 yards between the line of scrimmage and the offense's end zone. If the act of holding is committed from within the offense's own end zone, the result is a safety. In the NFL, when holding is committed by the defense, the penalty is 5 yards and an automatic first down.

In the 2021 NFL season offensive holding was the most common penalty issued with 649 penalties being issued for 6,297 penalty yards. In addition, defensive holding was the fourth most common penalty in the 2021 NFL season as well with 163 penalties being issued for a total of 780 penalty yards.
