= Dylan Cook =

American football player (born 1998)

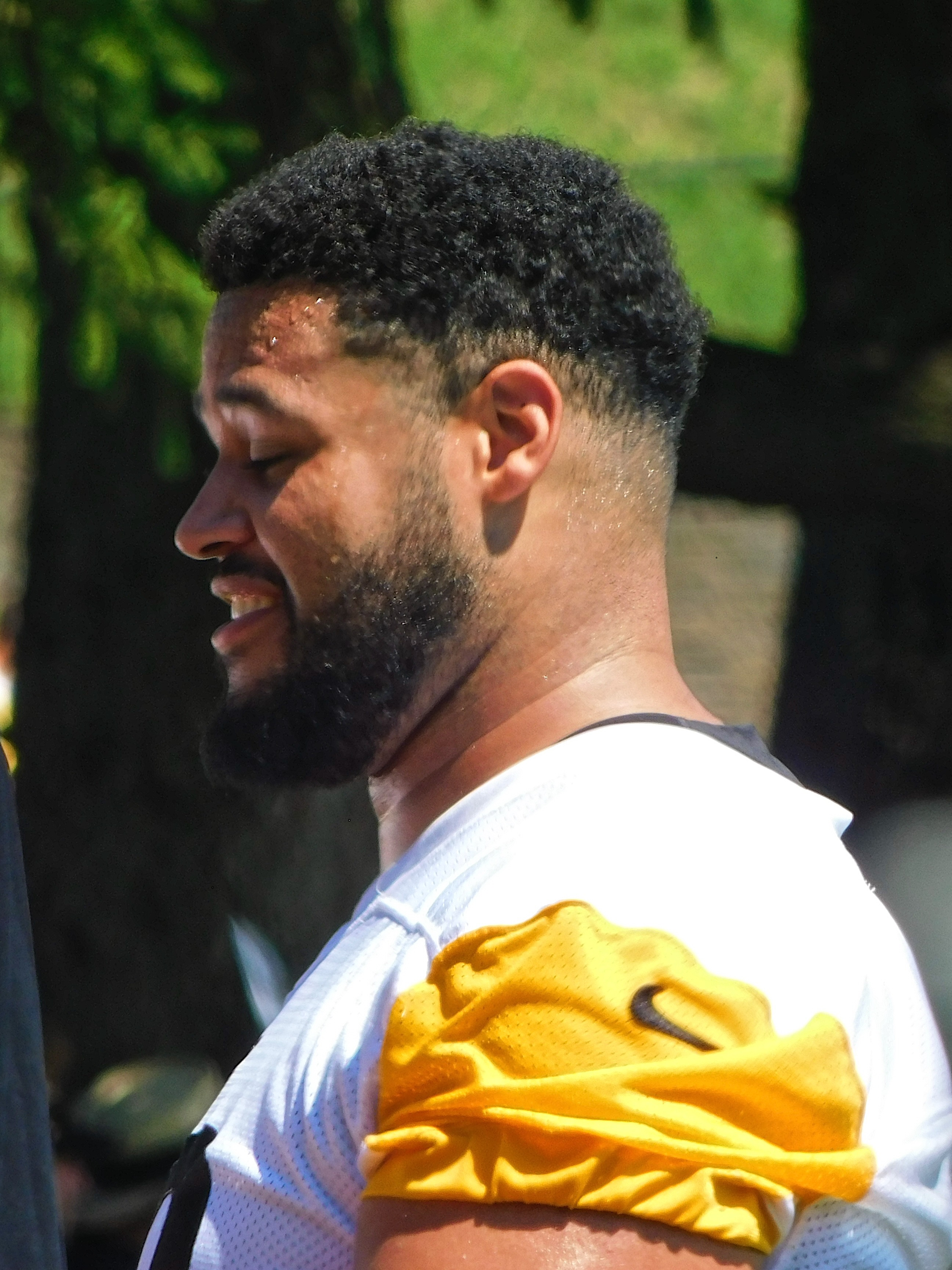
- Cook with the Pittsburgh Steelers in 2026

No. 60 – Pittsburgh Steelers
- Position: Offensive tackle
- Roster status: Active

Personal information
- Born: January 11, 1998 (age 28); Butte, Montana, U.S.
- Listed height: 6 ft 6 in (1.98 m)
- Listed weight: 305 lb (138 kg)

Career information
- High school: Butte (MT)
- College: Montana State–Northern (2016–2017); Montana (2018–2021)
- NFL draft: 2022: undrafted

Career history
- Tampa Bay Buccaneers (2022)*; Pittsburgh Steelers (2023–present)
- * Offseason or practice squad member only

Career NFL statistics as of Week 7, 2026
- Games played: 12
- Games started: 6
- Stats at Pro Football Reference

Dylan Cook (born January 11, 1998) is an American professional football offensive lineman for the Pittsburgh Steelers of the National Football League (NFL). He played college football for the Montana State–Northern Lights and Montana Grizzlies.

== Early life and education ==
Cook was born on January 11, 1998, in Bryn Mawr, Pennsylvania. He attended Butte High School and played quarterback, throwing for 3,124 yards as a senior. Afterwards, he joined the Montana State–Northern Lights of the National Association of Intercollegiate Athletics (NAIA) and saw limited playing time across the 2016 and 2017 seasons. In addition to playing quarterback, he also saw time at long snapper for them. He posted no statistics as a true freshman in 2016 and completed 11-of-18 pass attempts for 181 yards with two touchdown passes in 2017.

Cook then transferred to Montana as a walk-on and made the rare transition to the offensive line, sitting out his first season due to transfer rules. He impressed the team and was awarded an athletic scholarship prior to the 2019 season. He played 13 games, 11 as a starter, with them in 2019 before playing two games in the COVID-19-shortened 2020–21 season. He was a full-time starter in his final year, the fall 2021 season, and was selected fourth-team all-conference by Phil Steele. He finished his stint at Montana with 27 games played, 23 as a starter, at right tackle.

== Professional career ==
Pre-draft measurables
Height	Weight	Arm length	Hand span	Wingspan	40-yard dash	10-yard split	20-yard split	20-yard shuttle	Three-cone drill	Vertical jump	Broad jump	Bench press
6 ft 6 1/2 in (1.99 m)	308 lb (140 kg)	33 1/2 in (0.85 m)	9 3/8 in (0.24 m)	6 ft 9 5/8 in (2.07 m)	5.09 s	1.89 s	2.99 s	4.89 s	7.68 s	31.0 in (0.79 m)	8 ft 8 in (2.64 m)	20 reps
All values from Pro Day

=== Tampa Bay Buccaneers ===
After going unselected in the 2022 NFL draft, Cook was signed by the Tampa Bay Buccaneers as an undrafted free agent. He was waived at the final roster cuts and was subsequently brought back to the practice squad. He was released from the practice squad on December 6, but returned on December 27. Cook signed a reserve/future contract with Tampa Bay on January 17, 2023. He was waived by the Buccaneers on May 15.

=== Pittsburgh Steelers ===
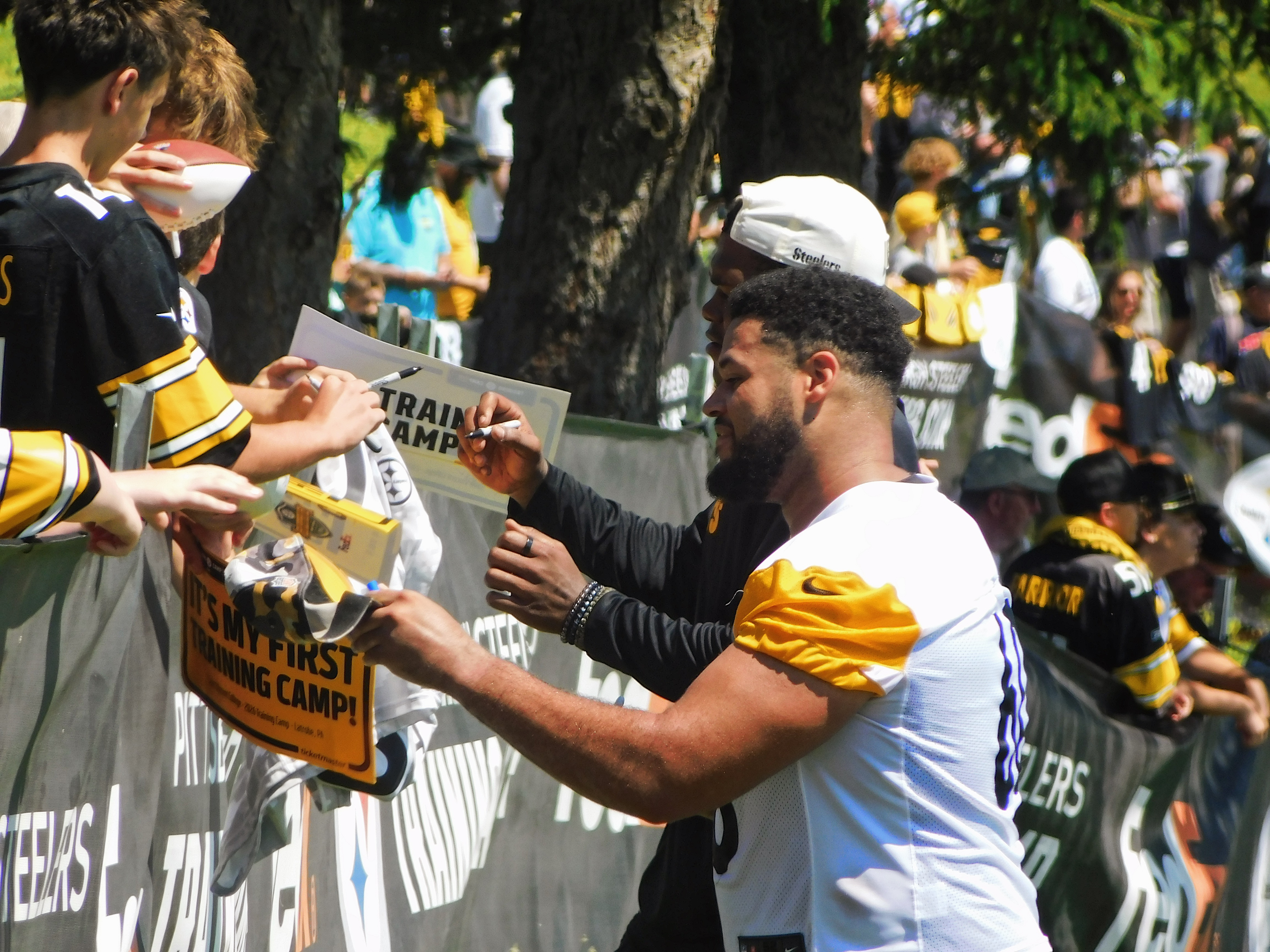
Cook signing autographs at training camp in 2026

After being waived by the Buccaneers, Cook was signed by the Pittsburgh Steelers on May 18, 2023. He made the Steelers' final roster to begin the season, but ultimately appeared in no games in 2023.

Cook was placed on injured reserve due to a Lisfranc injury on August 27, 2024. He was released on October 31, and was re-signed to the practice squad on November 4.

Cook signed a reserve/future contract with Pittsburgh on January 14, 2025. Cook was waived by the Steelers on August 26, and re-signed to the practice squad. Cook made his NFL debut on December 7, replacing an injured Andrus Peat at left tackle against the Baltimore Ravens. He was signed to the active roster on December 10 and became the team's starting left tackle in Peat's absence.
