= Jake Camarda =

American football player (born 1999)

No. 5
- Position: Punter

Personal information
- Born: April 20, 1999 (age 27); Norcross, Georgia, U.S.
- Listed height: 6 ft 1 in (1.85 m)
- Listed weight: 193 lb (88 kg)

Career information
- High school: Norcross
- College: Georgia (2018–2021)
- NFL draft: 2022: 4th round, 133rd overall pick

Career history
- Tampa Bay Buccaneers (2022–2024); Buffalo Bills (2025)*; Columbus Aviators (2026)*
- * Offseason or practice squad member only

Awards and highlights
- CFP national champion (2021); Third-team All-American (2020); 2× First-team All-SEC (2020, 2021); SEC Special Teams Player of the Year (2020)

Career NFL statistics
- Punts: 169
- Punting yards: 8,302
- Punting average: 49.1
- Longest punt: 74
- Inside 20: 53
- Stats at Pro Football Reference

Jack Jacob Camarda (born April 20, 1999) is an American former professional football player who was a punter in the National Football League (NFL). He played college football for the Georgia Bulldogs and was named SEC Special Teams Player of the Year in 2020 before being selected by the Tampa Bay Buccaneers in the fourth round of the 2022 NFL draft.

== Early life ==
Camarda attended Norcross High School in Norcross, Georgia. As a senior he punted 37 times in 10 games with an average 46.2 yards per punt; his longest punt was 65 yards. He was ranked as a 3-star recruit and the best punter in the class of 2018. He committed to Georgia on April 22, 2017, over the likes of Kentucky and Rutgers.

== College career ==
As a true freshman at Georgia in 2018, Camarda appeared in 13 games recording 43 punts for 1,830 yards, averaging 42.6 yards. In Camarda's sophomore season, he played in 14 games totaling 61 punts for 2,857 yards, averaging 46.8 yards. As a junior in 2020, Camarda recorded 36 punts for 1,677 yards with an average of 46.6 yards. He was named the Southeastern Conference (SEC) Special Teams Player of the Year and was selected to the First-team All-SEC. Camarda decided to come back for a senior season in 2021 rather than to enter the 2021 NFL draft. In Camarda's senior season, he played in 15 games having 47 punts for 2,197 yards with an average of 46.7 yards. He was named to the First-team All-SEC for a second straight season. Camarda declared for the 2022 NFL draft on January 17, 2022, one week after winning the National Championship.

== Professional career ==
Pre-draft measurables
Height	Weight	Arm length	Hand span	Wingspan	40-yard dash	10-yard split	20-yard split
6 ft 1 1/8 in (1.86 m)	193 lb (88 kg)	30 1/2 in (0.77 m)	9 1/2 in (0.24 m)	6 ft 2 7/8 in (1.90 m)	4.56 s	1.53 s	2.62 s
All values from NFL Combine

=== Tampa Bay Buccaneers ===
Camarda was selected by the Tampa Bay Buccaneers in the fourth round (133rd overall) of the 2022 NFL Draft. On June 9, 2022, he signed his rookie contract. Camarda was named the National Football Conference (NFC) Special Teams Player of the Week for his performance in Week 9, where he kicked a franchise-tying 74-yard punt, while also placing four of his six punts inside the 20-yard line. As a rookie, Camarda appeared in all 17 games and finished with a 48.85 average on 79 punts.

In Week 2 of the 2023 season, Camarda was named NFC Special Teams Player of the Week, becoming the first Buccaneer player to have won the title twice in franchise history. He was additionally named NFC Special Teams Player of the Month for September. In the 2023 season, he had 77 punts for 3,854 yards for a 50.05 average.

On October 22, 2024, Camarda was released by the Buccaneers in favor of Trenton Gill.

=== Buffalo Bills ===
On January 7, 2025, Camarda signed a reserve/future contract with the Buffalo Bills. He was waived on July 22.

=== Columbus Aviators ===
On February 3, 2026, Camarda signed with the Columbus Aviators of the United Football League (UFL). He was moved to the retired list on March 16, 2026.
