= 2022 Atlanta Falcons season =

57th season in franchise history

- Owner: Arthur Blank
- General manager: Terry Fontenot
- Head coach: Arthur Smith
- Home stadium: Mercedes-Benz Stadium

Results
- Record: 7–10
- Division place: 4th NFC South
- Playoffs: Did not qualify
- All-Pros: G Chris Lindstrom (2nd team)
- Pro Bowlers: G Chris Lindstrom

Uniform
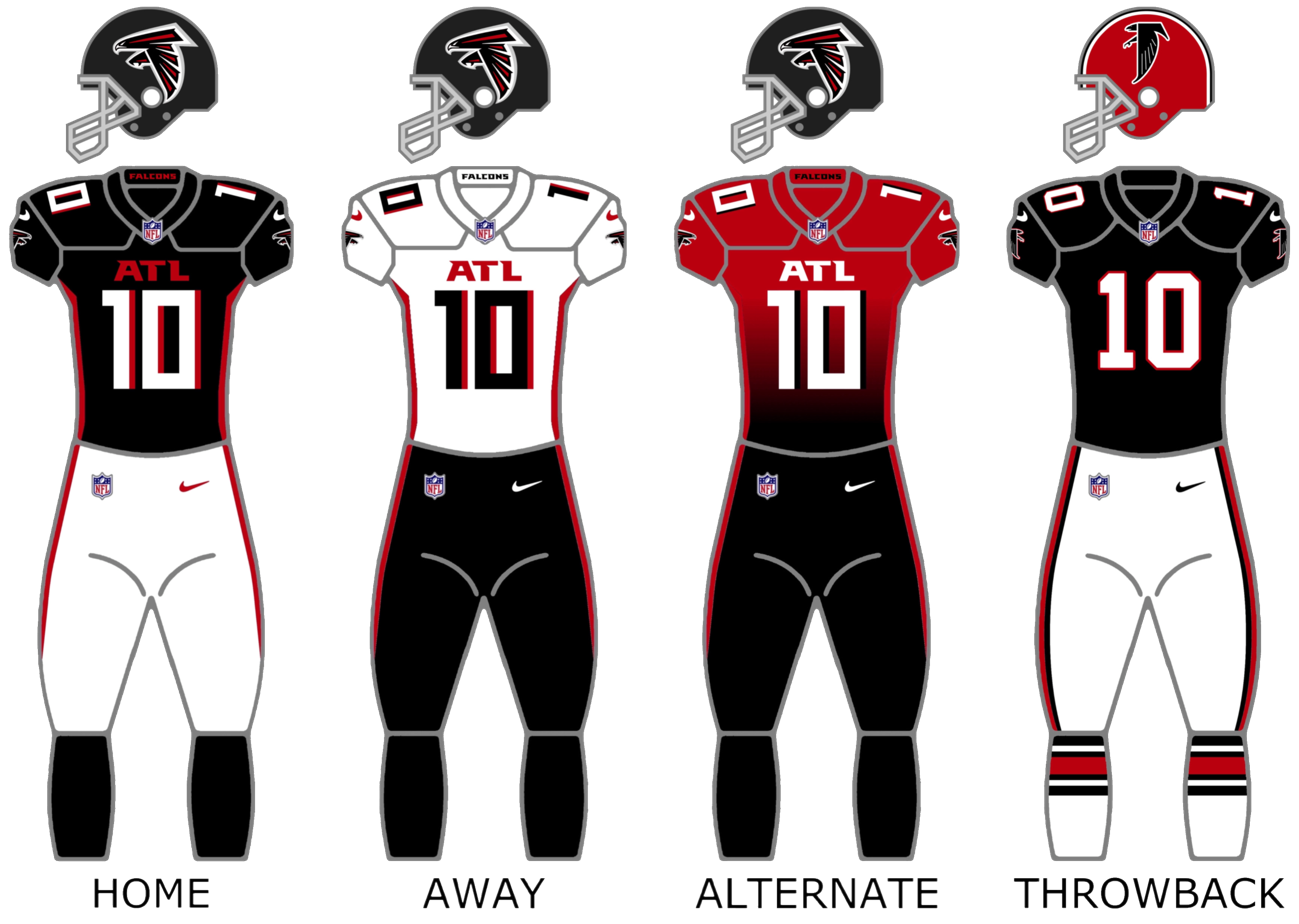

The 2022 season was the Atlanta Falcons' 57th in the National Football League (NFL), their sixth playing their home games at Mercedes-Benz Stadium and their second under head coach Arthur Smith.

The Falcons matched their 7–10 record from the previous season, but failed to qualify for the playoffs for the fifth consecutive season. Despite the setbacks, the Falcons defeated quarterback Tom Brady for the first time ever in his career during the last game of the regular season, avenging their Super Bowl LI loss. Also notable for the first time since 2007, long-time quarterback Matt Ryan was not on the roster as the Falcons traded him to Indianapolis on March 21. The team signed former Tennessee Titans and Las Vegas Raiders quarterback Marcus Mariota as their new quarterback on the same day. Mariota was reunited with Falcons head coach Arthur Smith, who served as the tight ends coach and offensive coordinator during Mariota's tenure with Tennessee (2015–2019). As of the 2024 season, this season is the Falcons' most recent last-place finish in the NFC South.

== Draft ==
2022 Atlanta Falcons Draft
Round	Selection	Player	Position	College	Notes
1	8	Drake London	WR	USC	
2	38	Arnold Ebiketie	DE	Penn State	from Carolina via NY Jets and NY Giants (Note: The Falcons traded second- and fourth-round selections (43rd and 114th overall) to the New York Giants in exchange for a second-round selection (38th overall).)
2	43	Traded to the New York Giants			
2	58	Troy Andersen	LB	Montana State	from Tennessee (Note: The Falcons traded WR Julio Jones and a 2023 sixth-round selection to the Tennessee Titans in exchange for a second-round selection (58th overall) and a 2023 fourth-round selection.)
3	74	Desmond Ridder	QB	Cincinnati	
3	82	DeAngelo Malone	LB	Western Kentucky	from Indianapolis (Note: The Falcons traded QB Matt Ryan to the Indianapolis Colts in exchange for a third-round selection (82nd overall).)
4	114	Traded to the New York Giants			
5	151	Tyler Allgeier	RB	BYU	
6	190	Justin Shaffer	G	Georgia	
6	213	John FitzPatrick	TE	Georgia	Compensatory pick
7	231	Traded to Buffalo (Note: The Falcons traded a seventh-round selection (231st overall) to the Buffalo Bills in exchange for TE Lee Smith.)			

Draft trades

2022 Atlanta Falcons undrafted free agents
Name	Position	College	Ref.
Jared Bernhardt	WR	Ferris State	
Stanley Berryhill	WR	Arizona	
Kuony Deng	OLB	California	
Matt Hankins	CB	Iowa	
Brad Hawkins	S	Michigan	
Timmy Horne	DT	Kansas State	
Tyshaun James	WR	Central Connecticut	
Nate Landman	LB	Colorado	
Clint Ratkovich	FB	Northern Illinois	
Bryce Rodgers	DT	UC Davis	
Derrick Tangelo	DT	Penn State	
Seth Vernon	P	Portland State	
Tyler Vrabel	OT	Boston College	
Leroy Watson	TE	UTSA	

== Staff ==
2022 Atlanta Falcons staff
Front office: Owner/chairman – Arthur Blank; President/CEO – Rich McKay; General manager – Terry Fontenot; Vice president of player personnel – Kyle Smith; Director of pro personnel – vacant; Director of coaching operations – Brian Griffin; Director of college scouting – Anthony Robinson; Assistant director of college scouting – Duwane Jones; Senior director of football administration – Chris Olsen; Senior personnel executive – Ryan Pace, Ruston Webster, Phil Emery; Head coaches: Head coach – Arthur Smith; Offensive coaches: Offensive coordinator – Dave Ragone; Quarterbacks – Charles London; Running backs – Michael Pitre; Receivers – T. J. Yates; Tight ends – Justin Peelle; Offensive line – Dwayne Ledford; Assistant offensive line – Mario Jeberaeel; Senior offensive assistant – Steve Jackson; Offensive assistant – Nick Edwards; Run game specialist – Danny Breyer	Defensive coaches: Defensive coordinator – Dean Pees; Defensive line – Gary Emanuel; Linebackers – Frank Bush; Outside linebackers – Ted Monachino; Secondary – Jon Hoke; Assistant defensive backs – Nick Perry; Defensive assistant – Lanier Goethie; Defensive assistant – Matt Pees; Special teams coaches: Special teams coordinator – Marquice Williams; Senior assistant – Steve Hoffman; Strength and conditioning: Head strength and conditioning – Dr. Thomas Stallworth; Assistant strength and conditioning – Roderick Moore Jr; Assistant strength and conditioning – Bobby Thomas

== Final roster ==
2022 Atlanta Falcons roster
Quarterbacks (QB): 4 Desmond Ridder; 6 Logan Woodside; Running backs (RB): 25 Tyler Allgeier; 84 Cordarrelle Patterson; 40 Keith Smith; 35 Avery Williams; Wide receivers (WR): 80 Josh Ali; 14 Damiere Byrd; 88 Frank Darby; 12 KhaDarel Hodge; 5 Drake London; 17 Olamide Zaccheaus; Tight ends (TE): 86 Anthony Firkser; 15 Feleipe Franks; 46 Parker Hesse; 85 MyCole Pruitt	Offensive linemen (OL): 67 Drew Dalman C; 66 Colby Gossett G; 61 Matt Hennessy G/C; 74 Germain Ifedi T; 63 Chris Lindstrom G; 70 Jake Matthews T; 76 Kaleb McGary T; 64 Ryan Neuzil G/C; 68 Elijah Wilkinson G; Defensive linemen (DL): 98 Abdullah Anderson NT; 94 Jalen Dalton DE; 91 Matt Dickerson DE; 93 Timmy Horne NT; 97 Grady Jarrett DE; 90 Jaleel Johnson DE	Linebackers (LB): 44 Troy Andersen ILB; 59 David Anenih OLB; 9 Lorenzo Carter OLB; 47 Arnold Ebiketie OLB; 54 Rashaan Evans ILB; 53 Nick Kwiatkoski ILB; 51 DeAngelo Malone OLB; 92 Ade Ogundeji OLB; 3 Mykal Walker ILB; Defensive backs (DB): 45 Micah Abernathy FS; 37 Dee Alford CB; 22 Cornell Armstrong CB; 21 Rashad Fenton CB; 28 Mike Ford CB; 27 Richie Grant SS; 34 Darren Hall CB; 23 Erik Harris SS; 32 Jaylinn Hawkins FS; 26 Isaiah Oliver CB; 24 A. J. Terrell CB; Special teams (ST): 7 Younghoe Koo K; 48 Liam McCullough LS; 13 Bradley Pinion P	Practice squad: 36 B. J. Baylor RB; 56 Quinton Bell OLB; 79 Amani Bledsoe DE; 82 Emeka Emezie WR (PS/I); 52 Dorian Etheridge ILB; 27 Javelin Guidry CB; 30 Matt Hankins CB; 62 Jonotthan Harrison C; 81 Ra'Shaun Henry WR; 55 Nate Landman ILB; 39 Dylan Mabin CB; 41 John Raine TE; 38 Clint Ratkovich FB; 33 John Reid CB; 75 Justin Shaffer G; 72 Kobe Smith DE; 99 Derrick Tangelo DE (PS/I); 73 Tyler Vrabel T (PS/I); Reserve: 83 Jared Bernhardt WR (IR); -- Beau Brinkley LS; 71 Chuma Edoga G (IR); 87 John FitzPatrick TE (IR); 95 Ta'Quon Graham DE (IR); 29 Casey Hayward CB (IR); 42 Caleb Huntley RB (IR); 1 Marcus Mariota QB (IR); 77 Jalen Mayfield G (IR); 20 Jovante Moffatt FS (IR); 8 Kyle Pitts TE (IR); 96 Vincent Taylor NT (IR); Rookies in italics 54 active, 12 reserve, 15 practice squad (3 exempt)

== Preseason ==
The Falcons' preseason opponents and schedule were announced in the spring.

Week	Date	Opponent	Result	Record	Venue	Recap
1	August 12	at Detroit Lions	W 27–23	1–0	Ford Field	Recap
2	August 22	at New York Jets	L 16–24	1–1	Metlife Stadium	Recap
3	August 27	Jacksonville Jaguars	W 28–12	2–1	Mercedes Benz Stadium	Recap

== Regular season ==
=== Schedule ===
Week	Date	Opponent	Result	Record	Venue	Recap
1	September 11	**New Orleans Saints**	**L** 26–27	0–1	Mercedes-Benz Stadium	Recap
2	September 18	at Los Angeles Rams	**L** 27–31	0–2	SoFi Stadium	Recap
3	September 25	at Seattle Seahawks	**W** 27–23	1–2	Lumen Field	Recap
4	October 2	Cleveland Browns	**W** 23–20	2–2	Mercedes-Benz Stadium	Recap
5	October 9	at **Tampa Bay Buccaneers**	**L** 15–21	2–3	Raymond James Stadium	Recap
6	October 16	San Francisco 49ers	**W** 28–14	3–3	Mercedes-Benz Stadium	Recap
7	October 23	at Cincinnati Bengals	**L** 17–35	3–4	Paycor Stadium	Recap
8	October 30	**Carolina Panthers**	**W** 37–34 (OT)	4–4	Mercedes-Benz Stadium	Recap
9	November 6	Los Angeles Chargers	**L** 17–20	4–5	Mercedes-Benz Stadium	Recap
10	November 10	at **Carolina Panthers**	**L** 15–25	4–6	Bank of America Stadium	Recap
11	November 20	Chicago Bears	**W** 27–24	5–6	Mercedes-Benz Stadium	Recap
12	November 27	at Washington Commanders	**L** 13–19	5–7	FedExField	Recap
13	December 4	Pittsburgh Steelers	**L** 16–19	5–8	Mercedes-Benz Stadium	Recap
14	Bye					
15	December 18	at **New Orleans Saints**	**L** 18–21	5–9	Caesars Superdome	Recap
16	December 24	at Baltimore Ravens	**L** 9–17	5–10	M&T Bank Stadium	Recap
17	January 1	Arizona Cardinals	**W** 20–19	6–10	Mercedes-Benz Stadium	Recap
18	January 8	**Tampa Bay Buccaneers**	**W** 30–17	7–10	Mercedes-Benz Stadium	Recap

Note: Intra-division opponents are in bold text.

=== Game summaries ===
==== Week 1: vs. New Orleans Saints ====
Week 1: New Orleans Saints at Atlanta Falcons – Game summary

Quarter	1	2	3	4	Total
**Saints**	7	0	3	17	**27**
Falcons	3	13	7	3	**26**

at Mercedes-Benz Stadium, Atlanta, Georgia

- Date: September 11
- Game time: 1:00 p.m. EDT
- Game weather: None (retractable roof closed)
- Game attendance: 70,078
- Referee: Alex Kemp
- TV announcers (Fox): Kenny Albert, Jonathan Vilma and Shannon Spake
- Recap, Game Book

Game information

**First quarter**

- ATL – Younghoe Koo 54-yard field goal, 10:40. Falcons 3–0. **Drive: 10 plays, 40 yards, 4:20.**
- NO – Taysom Hill 11-yard run (Wil Lutz kick), 5:44. Saints 7–3. **Drive: 5 plays, 77 yards, 2:02.**

**Second quarter**

- ATL – Cordarrelle Patterson 5-yard run (Younghoe Koo kick), 12:12. Falcons 10–7. **Drive: 9 plays, 66 yards, 5:30.**
- ATL – Younghoe Koo 50-yard field goal, 1:06. Falcons 13–7. **Drive: 7 plays, 50 yards, 2:41.**
- ATL – Younghoe Koo 40-yard field goal, 0:00. Falcons 16–7. **Drive: 4 plays, 39 yards, 0:23.**

**Third quarter**

- NO – Wil Lutz 49-yard field goal, 9:15. Falcons 16–10. **Drive: 11 plays, 44 yards, 5:45.**
- ATL – Marcus Mariota 2-yard run (Younghoe Koo kick), 6:49. Falcons 23–10. **Drive: 5 plays, 75 yards, 2:26.**

**Fourth quarter**

- ATL – Younghoe Koo 27-yard field goal, 12:41. Falcons 26–10. **Drive: 9 plays, 41 yards, 4:00.**
- NO – Michael Thomas 3-yard pass from Jameis Winston (Jameis Winston–Chris Olave pass), 11:12. Falcons 26–18. **Drive: 4 plays, 75 yards, 1:29.**
- NO – Michael Thomas 9-yard pass from Jameis Winston (run failed), 3:38. Falcons 26–24. **Drive: 8 plays, 86 yards, 3:27.**
- NO – Wil Lutz 51-yard field goal, 0:19. Saints 27–26. **Drive: 5 plays, 47 yards, 0:29.**

**Top passers**

- NO – Jameis Winston – 23/34, 269 yards, 2 TD
- ATL – Marcus Mariota – 20/33, 215 yards

**Top rushers**

- NO – Taysom Hill – 4 rushes, 81 yards, TD
- ATL – Cordarrelle Patterson – 22 rushes, 120 yards, TD

**Top receivers**

- NO – Jarvis Landry – 7 receptions, 114 yards
- ATL – Drake London – 5 receptions, 74 yards

==== Week 2: at Los Angeles Rams ====
Week 2: Atlanta Falcons at Los Angeles Rams – Game summary

Quarter	1	2	3	4	Total
Falcons	0	3	7	17	**27**
**Rams**	7	14	7	3	**31**

at SoFi Stadium, Inglewood, California

- Date: September 18
- Game time: 4:05 p.m. EDT/1:05 p.m. PDT
- Game weather: Cloudy, 74 °F (23 °C)
- Game attendance: 71,802
- Referee: Clay Martin
- TV announcers (Fox): Kevin Kugler, Mark Sanchez and Laura Okmin
- Recap, Game Book

Game information

**First quarter**

- LAR – Allen Robinson 1-yard pass from Matthew Stafford (Matt Gay kick), 1:44. Rams 7–0. **Drive: 9 plays, 66 yards, 5:10.**

**Second quarter**

- LAR – Darrell Henderson 8-yard run (Matt Gay kick), 9:30. Rams 14–0. **Drive: 8 plays, 50 yards, 4:41.**
- ATL – Younghoe Koo 26-yard field goal, 2:44. Rams 14–3. **Drive: 11 plays, 67 yards, 6:46.**
- LAR – Cooper Kupp 3-yard pass from Matthew Stafford (Matt Gay kick), 0:14. Rams 21–3. **Drive: 3 plays, 9 yards, 0:14.**

**Third quarter**

- LAR – Cooper Kupp 10-yard pass from Matthew Stafford (Matt Gay kick), 9:22. Rams 28–3. **Drive: 10 plays, 75 yards, 5:38.**
- ATL – Drake London 4-yard pass from Marcus Mariota (Younghoe Koo kick), 3:20. Rams 28–10. **Drive: 5 plays, 20 yards, 3:03.**

**Fourth quarter**

- LAR – Matt Gay 20-yard field goal, 12:13. Rams 31–10. **Drive: 13 plays, 78 yards, 6:07.**
- ATL – Olamide Zaccheaus 11-yard pass from Marcus Mariota (Younghoe Koo kick), 8:14. Rams 31–17. **Drive: 8 plays, 72 yards, 3:59.**
- ATL – Lorenzo Carter 26-yard return of blocked punt (Marcus Mariota–Drake London pass), 4:57. Rams 31–25.
- ATL – Brandon Powell OB in end zone, forced by DeAundre Alford, for a Safety, 0:06. Rams 31–27.

**Top passers**

- ATL – Marcus Mariota – 17/26, 196 yards, 2 TD, 2 INT
- LAR – Matthew Stafford – 27/36, 272 yards, 3 TD, 2 INT

**Top rushers**

- ATL – Cordarrelle Patterson – 10 rushes, 41 yards
- LAT – Darrell Henderson – 10 rushes, 47 yards, TD

**Top receivers**

- ATL – Drake London – 8 receptions, 86 yards, TD
- LAR – Cooper Kupp – 11 receptions, 108 yards, 2 TD

==== Week 3: at Seattle Seahawks ====
Week 3: Atlanta Falcons at Seattle Seahawks – Game summary

Quarter	1	2	3	4	Total
**Falcons**	10	7	10	0	**27**
Seahawks	10	10	3	0	**23**

at Lumen Field, Seattle, Washington

- Date: September 25
- Game time: 4:25 p.m. EDT/1:25 p.m. PDT
- Game weather: Sunny, 67 °F (19 °C)
- Game attendance: 68,773
- Referee: Tra Blake
- TV announcers (Fox): Chris Myers, Robert Smith and Jen Hale
- Recap, Game Book

Game information

**First quarter**

- SEA – Jason Myers 32-yard field goal, 10:19. Seahwaks 3–0. **Drive: 11 plays, 61 yards, 4:41.**
- ATL – Marcus Mariota 1-yard run (Younghoe Koo kick), 7:10. Falcons 7–3. **Drive: 7 plays, 75 yards, 3:09.**
- SEA – Will Dissly 18-yard pass from Geno Smith (Jason Myers kick), 4:12. Seahawks 10–7. **Drive: 6 plays, 74 yards, 2:58.**
- ATL – Younghoe Koo 41-yard field goal, 0:07. Tied 10–10. **Drive: 9 plays, 52 yards, 4:05.**

**Second quarter**

- ATL – Cordarrelle Patterson 17-yard run (Younghoe Koo kick), 8:12. Falcons 17–10. **Drive: 9 plays, 89 yards, 5:31.**
- SEA – DK Metcalf 18-yard pass from Geno Smith (Jason Myers kick), 3:58. Tied 17–17. **Drive: 9 plays, 75 yards, 4:14.**
- SEA – Jason Myers 31-yard field goal, 0:05. Seahwaks 20–17. **Drive: 12 plays, 67 yards, 2:58.**

**Third quarter**

- ATL – Younghoe Koo 54-yard field goal, 10:00. Tied 20–20. **Drive: 9 plays, 39 yards, 5:00.**
- SEA – Jason Myers 25-yard field goal, 3:11. Seahawks 23–20. **Drive: 13 plays, 68 yards, 6:49.**
- ATL – Drake London 14-yard pass from Marcus Mariota (Younghoe Koo kick), 0:35. Falcons 27–23. **Drive: 5 plays, 75 yards, 2:36.**

**Fourth quarter**

- No scoring plays.

**Top passers**

- ATL – Marcus Mariota – 13/20, 229 yards, TD, INT
- SEA – Geno Smith – 32/44, 325 yards, 2 TD, INT

**Top rushers**

- ATL – Cordarrelle Patterson – 17 rushes, 141 yards, TD
- SEA – Rashaad Penny – 14 rushes, 66 yards

**Top receivers**

- ATL – Kyle Pitts – 5 receptions, 87 yards
- SEA – Tyler Lockett – 9 receptions, 76 yards

==== Week 4: vs. Cleveland Browns ====
Week 4: Cleveland Browns at Atlanta Falcons – Game summary

Quarter	1	2	3	4	Total
Browns	0	10	3	7	**20**
**Falcons**	10	0	0	13	**23**

at Mercedes-Benz Stadium, Atlanta, Georgia

- Date: October 2
- Game time: 1:00 p.m. EDT
- Game weather: Sunny, 72 °F (22 °C) (retractable roof open)
- Game attendance: 69,435
- Referee: Craig Wrolstad
- TV announcers (CBS): Andrew Catalon and Tiki Barber
- Recap, Game Book

Game information

**First quarter**

- ATL – Younghoe Koo 30-yard field goal, 3:26. Falcons 3–0. **Drive: 14 plays, 84 yards, 6:43.**
- ATL – Cordarrelle Patterson 13-yard run (Younghoe Koo kick), 1:20. Falcons 10–0. **Drive: 3 plays, 31 yards, 1:32.**

**Second quarter**

- CLE – Jacoby Brissett 4-yard run (Cade York kick), 7:35. Falcons 10–7. **Drive: 16 plays, 75 yards, 8:45.**
- CLE – Cade York 29-yard field goal, 0:07. Tied 10–10. **Drive: 13 plays, 69 yards, 6:24.**

**Third quarter**

- CLE – Cade York 45-yard field goal, 3:06. Browns 13–10. **Drive: 7 plays, 16 yards, 3:51.**

**Fourth quarter**

- ATL – Caleb Huntley 5-yard run (Younghoe Koo kick), 12:51. Falcons 17–13. **Drive: 10 plays, 75 yards, 5:15.**
- CLE – Nick Chubb 28-yard run (Cade York kick), 9:51. Browns 20–17. **Drive: 6 plays, 75 yards, 3:00.**
- ATL – Younghoe Koo 21-yard field goal, 7:19. Tied 20–20. **Drive: 7 plays, 73 yards, 2:32.**
- ATL – Younghoe Koo 45-yard field goal, 2:28. Falcons 23–20. **Drive: 6 plays, 64 yards, 1:07.**

**Top passers**

- CLE – Jacoby Brissett – 21/35, 234 yards, INT
- ATL – Marcus Mariota – 7/19, 139 yards, INT

**Top rushers**

- CLE – Nick Chubb – 19 rushes, 118 yards, TD
- ATL – Tyler Allgeier – 10 rushes, 84 yards

**Top receivers**

- CLE – David Njoku – 5 receptions, 73 yards
- ATL – Olamide Zaccheaus – 2 receptions, 55 yards

==== Week 5: at Tampa Bay Buccaneers ====
Week 5: Atlanta Falcons at Tampa Bay Buccaneers – Game summary

Quarter	1	2	3	4	Total
Falcons	0	0	0	15	**15**
**Buccaneers**	0	13	8	0	**21**

at Raymond James Stadium, Tampa, Florida

- Date: October 9
- Game time: 1:00 p.m. EDT
- Game weather: Clear, 83 °F (28 °C)
- Game attendance: 68,299
- Referee: Jerome Boger
- TV announcers (Fox): Joe Davis, Daryl Johnston and Pam Oliver
- Recap, Game Book

Game information

**First quarter**

- No scoring plays.

**Second quarter**

- TB – Leonard Fournette 1-yard run (Ryan Succop kick), 9:31. Buccaneers 7–0. **Drive: 13 plays, 88 yards, 5:21.**
- TB – Ryan Succop 21-yard field goal, 1:18. Buccaneers 10–0. **Drive: 13 plays, 84 yards, 4:25.**
- TB – Ryan Succop 44-yard field goal, 0:00. Buccaneers 13–0. **Drive: 4 plays, 32 yards, 0:20.**

**Third quarter**

- TB – Leonard Fournette 1-yard pass from Tom Brady (Tom Brady-Russell Gage pass), 6:09. Buccaneers 21–0. **Drive: 11 plays, 74 yards, 4:19.**

**Fourth quarter**

- ATL – Avery Williams 8-yard run (Younghoe Koo kick), 13:39. Buccaneers 21–7. **Drive: 6 plays, 43 yards, 3:04.**
- ATL – Olamide Zaccheaus 19-yard pass from Marcus Mariota (Marcus Mariota-KhaDarel Hodge pass), 4:38. Buccaneers 21–15. **Drive: 12 plays, 70 yards, 5:11.**

**Top passers**

- ATL – Marcus Mariota – 14/25, 147 yards, TD
- TB – Tom Brady – 35/52, 351 yards, TD

**Top rushers**

- ATL – Marcus Mariota – 7 rushes, 61 yards
- TB – Leonard Fournette – 14 rushes, 56 yards, TD

**Top receivers**

- ATL – Drake London – 4 receptions, 35 yards
- TB – Leonard Fournette – 10 receptions, 83 yards, TD

==== Week 6: vs. San Francisco 49ers ====
Week 6: San Francisco 49ers at Atlanta Falcons – Game summary

Quarter	1	2	3	4	Total
49ers	0	14	0	0	**14**
**Falcons**	14	7	7	0	**28**

at Mercedes-Benz Stadium, Atlanta, Georgia

- Date: October 16
- Game time: 1:00 p.m. EDT
- Game weather: Sunny, 77 °F (25 °C) (retractable roof open)
- Game attendance: 69,813
- Referee: Carl Cheffers
- TV announcers (Fox): Noah Eagle, Mark Schlereth and Kristina Pink
- Recap, Game Book

Game information

**First quarter**

- ATL – MyCole Pruitt 2-yard pass from Marcus Mariota (Younghoe Koo kick), 8:46. Falcons 7–0. **Drive: 11 plays, 74 yards, 6:14.**
- ATL – Jaylinn Hawkins fumble recovery in endzone (Younghoe Koo kick), 1:26. Falcons 14–0.

**Second quarter**

- SF – Brandon Aiyuk 12-yard pass from Jimmy Garoppolo (Robbie Gould kick), 11:34. Falcons 14–7. **Drive: 8 plays, 79 yards, 4:52.**
- SF – Brandon Aiyuk 14-yard pass from Jimmy Garoppolo (Robbie Gould kick), 7:07. Tied 14–14. **Drive: 4 plays, 32 yards, 2:09.**
- ATL – Marcus Mariota 3-yard run (Younghoe Koo kick), 0:57. Falcons 21–14. **Drive: 11 plays, 75 yards, 6:10.**

**Third quarter**

- ATL – Kyle Pitts 7-yard pass from Marcus Mariota (Younghoe Koo kick), 8:40. Falcons 28–14. **Drive: 9 plays, 65 yards, 5:12.**

**Fourth quarter**

- No scoring plays.

**Top passers**

- SF – Jimmy Garoppolo – 29/41, 296 yards, 2 TD, 2 INT
- ATL – Marcus Mariota – 13/14, 129 yards, 2 TD

**Top rushers**

- SF – Jeff Wilson Jr. – 7 rushes, 25 yards
- ATL – Caleb Huntley – 16 rushes, 59 yards

**Top receivers**

- SF – Brandon Aiyuk – 8 receptions, 83 yards, 2 TD
- ATL – Olamide Zaccheaus – 4 receptions, 58 yards

==== Week 7: at Cincinnati Bengals ====
Week 7: Atlanta Falcons at Cincinnati Bengals – Game summary

Quarter	1	2	3	4	Total
Falcons	0	17	0	0	**17**
**Bengals**	14	14	7	0	**35**

at Paycor Stadium, Cincinnati, Ohio

- Date: October 23
- Game time: 1:00 p.m. EDT
- Game weather: Sunny, 73 °F (23 °C)
- Game attendance: 66,158
- Referee: Clete Blakeman
- TV announcers (Fox): Brandon Gaudin, Robert Smith and Jen Hale
- Recap, Game Book

Game information

**First quarter**

- CIN – Tyler Boyd 60-yard pass from Joe Burrow (Evan McPherson kick), 13:00. Bengals 7–0. **Drive: 4 plays, 84 yards, 2:00.**
- CIN – Joe Mixon 1-yard run (Evan McPherson kick), 4:51. Bengals 14–0. **Drive: 11 plays, 71 yards, 5:13.**

**Second quarter**

- CIN – Ja'Marr Chase 32-yard pass from Joe Burrow (Evan McPherson kick), 14:55. Bengals 21–0. **Drive: 6 plays, 75 yards, 3:20.**
- ATL – Tyler Allgeier 1-yard run (Younghoe Koo kick), 4:46. Bengals 21–7. **Drive: 16 plays, 75 yards, 10:09.**
- CIN – Ja'Marr Chase 41-yard pass from Joe Burrow (Evan McPherson kick), 0:49. Bengals 28–7. **Drive: 7 plays, 84 yards, 3:57.**
- ATL – Damiere Byrd 75-yard pass from Marcus Mariota (Younghoe Koo kick), 0:39. Bengals 28–14. **Drive: 1 play, 75 yards, 0:10.**
- ATL – Younghoe Koo 43-yard field goal, 0:00. Bengals 28–17. **Drive: 1 play, 0 yards, 0:03.**

**Third quarter**

- CIN – Joe Burrow 1-yard run (Evan McPherson kick), 5:20. Bengals 35–17. **Drive: 7 plays, 62 yards, 3:44.**

**Fourth quarter**

- No scoring plays.

**Top passers**

- ATL – Marcus Mariota – 8/13, 124 yards, TD
- CIN – Joe Burrow – 34/42, 481 yards, 3 TD

**Top rushers**

- ATL – Tyler Allgeier – 16 rushes, 50 yards, TD
- CIN – Joe Mixon – 17 rushes, 58 yards, TD

**Top receivers**

- ATL – Damiere Byrd – 1 reception, 75 yards, TD
- CIN – Tyler Boyd – 8 receptions, 155 yards, TD

==== Week 8: vs. Carolina Panthers ====
Week 8: Carolina Panthers at Atlanta Falcons – Game summary

Quarter	1	2	3	4	OT	Total
Panthers	3	7	3	21	0	**34**
**Falcons**	0	14	7	13	3	**37**

at Mercedes-Benz Stadium, Atlanta, Georgia

- Date: October 30
- Game time: 1:00 p.m. EDT
- Game weather: None (retractable roof closed)
- Game attendance: 68,996
- Referee: Shawn Hochuli
- TV announcers (Fox): Kenny Albert, Jonathan Vilma and Shannon Spake
- Recap, Game Book

Game information

**First quarter**

- CAR – Eddy Piñeiro 37-yard field goal, 6:50. Panthers 3–0. **Drive: 6 plays, 18 yards, 2:33.**

**Second quarter**

- ATL – Kyle Pitts 2-yard pass from Marcus Mariota (Younghoe Koo kick), 10:13. Falcons 7–3. **Drive: 10 plays, 69 yards, 6:02.**
- CAR – D'Onta Foreman 2-yard run (Eddy Piñeiro kick), 4:51. Panthers 10–7. **Drive: 12 plays, 75 yards, 5:22.**
- ATL – Lorenzo Carter 28-yard interception return (Younghoe Koo kick), 0:41. Falcons 14–10.

**Third quarter**

- CAR – Eddy Piñeiro 42-yard field goal, 11:33. Falcons 14–13. **Drive: 9 plays, 51 yards, 3:27.**
- ATL – Tyler Allgeier 25-yard pass from Marcus Mariota (Younghoe Koo kick), 1:40. Falcons 21–13. **Drive: 8 plays, 62 yards, 4:45.**

**Fourth quarter**

- CAR – D'Onta Foreman 1-yard run (D'Onta Foreman run), 11:46. Tied 21–21. **Drive: 10 plays, 75 yards, 4:54.**
- ATL – Younghoe Koo 30-yard field goal, 7:33. Falcons 24–21. **Drive: 8 plays, 68 yards, 4:13.**
- CAR – D'Onta Foreman 12-yard run (Eddy Piñeiro kick), 3:06. Panthers 28–24. **Drive: 7 plays, 60 yards, 7:27.**
- ATL – Damiere Byrd 47-yard pass from Marcus Mariota (Younghoe Koo kick), 2:14. Falcons 31–28. **Drive: 4 plays, 75 yards, 0:52.**
- ATL – Younghoe Koo 34-yard field goal, 0:36. Falcons 34–28. **Drive: 4 plays, 2 yards, 1:03.**
- CAR – D. J. Moore 62-yard pass from P. J. Walker (kick failed, wide left), 0:12. Tied 34–34. **Drive: 3 plays, 75 yards, 0:24.**

**Overtime**

- ATL – Younghoe Koo 41-yard field goal, 1:55. Falcons 37–34. **Drive: 7 plays, 62 yards, 3:44.**

**Top passers**

- CAR – P. J. Walker – 19/36, 317 yards, TD, INT
- ATL – Marcus Mariota – 20/28, 253 yards, 3 TD, 2 INT

**Top rushers**

- CAR – D'Onta Foreman – 26 rushes, 118 yards, 3 TD
- ATL – Caleb Huntley – 16 rushes, 91 yards

**Top receivers**

- CAR – D. J. Moore – 6 receptions, 152 yards, TD
- ATL – Kyle Pitts – 5 receptions, 80 yards, TD

==== Week 9: vs. Los Angeles Chargers ====
Week 9: Los Angeles Chargers at Atlanta Falcons – Game summary

Quarter	1	2	3	4	Total
**Chargers**	0	14	0	6	**20**
Falcons	10	0	7	0	**17**

at Mercedes-Benz Stadium, Atlanta, Georgia

- Date: November 6
- Game time: 1:00 p.m. EST
- Game weather: Cloudy, 80 °F (27 °C) (retractable roof open)
- Game attendance: 69,299
- Referee: John Hussey
- TV announcers (Fox): Kenny Albert, Jonathan Vilma and Shannon Spake
- Recap, Game Book

Game information

**First quarter**

- ATL – Cordarrelle Patterson 1-yard run (Younghoe Koo kick), 10:40. Falcons 7–0. **Drive: 8 plays, 75 yards, 4:20.**
- ATL – Younghoe Koo 29-yard field goal, 0:52. Falcons 10–0. **Drive: 14 plays, 70 yards, 8:22.**

**Second quarter**

- LAC – Austin Ekeler 2-yard run (Cameron Dicker kick), 4:38. Falcons 10–7. **Drive: 15 plays, 83 yards, 8:35.**
- LAC – Austin Ekeler 1-yard pass from Justin Herbert (Cameron Dicker kick), 0:32. Chargers 14–10. **Drive: 10 plays, 63 yards, 1:56.**

**Third quarter**

- ATL – Cordarrelle Patterson 3-yard run (Younghoe Koo kick), 3:44. Falcons 17–14. **Drive: 10 plays, 53 yards, 4:43.**

**Fourth quarter**

- LAC – Cameron Dicker 31-yard field goal, 5:27. Tied 17–17. **Drive: 14 plays, 47 yards, 6:45.**
- LAC – Cameron Dicker 37-yard field goal, 0:00. Chargers 20–17. **Drive: 3 plays, 24 yards, 0:34.**

**Top passers**

- LAC – Justin Herbert – 30/43, 245 yards, TD, INT
- ATL – Marcus Mariota – 12/23, 129 yards

**Top rushers**

- LAC – Austin Ekeler – 14 rushes, 47 yards, TD
- ATL – Tyler Allgeier – 10 rushes, 99 yards

**Top receivers**

- LAC – Josh Palmer – 8 receptions, 106 yards
- ATL – Kyle Pitts – 2 receptions, 27 yards

==== Week 10: at Carolina Panthers ====
Week 10: Atlanta Falcons at Carolina Panthers – Game summary

Quarter	1	2	3	4	Total
Falcons	0	3	6	6	**15**
**Panthers**	3	10	6	6	**25**

at Bank of America Stadium, Charlotte, North Carolina

- Date: November 10
- Game time: 8:15 p.m. EST
- Game weather: Light rain, 60 °F (16 °C)
- Game attendance: 72,029
- Referee: Adrian Hill
- TV announcers (WAGA/Prime Video): Al Michaels, Kirk Herbstreit and Kaylee Hartung
- Recap, Game Book

Game information

**First quarter**

- CAR – Eddy Piñeiro 46-yard field goal, 6:59. Panthers 3–0. **Drive: 10 plays, 41 yards, 4:22.**

**Second quarter**

- CAR – Laviska Shenault 41-yard run (Eddy Piñeiro kick), 4:34. Panthers 10–0. **Drive: 2 plays, 43 yards, 0:52.**
- CAR – Eddy Piñeiro 49-yard field goal, 1:47. Panthers 13–0. **Drive: 7 plays, 14 yards, 2:24.**
- ATL – Younghoe Koo 33-yard field goal, 0:00. Panthers 13–3. **Drive: 8 plays, 60 yards, 1:47.**

**Third quarter**

- ATL – Drake London 7-yard pass from Marcus Mariota (kick failed), 6:15. Panthers 13–9. **Drive: 6 plays, 42 yards, 2:46.**
- CAR – D'Onta Foreman 12-yard run (kick failed), 1:51. Panthers 19–9. **Drive: 7 plays, 84 yards, 4:24.**

**Fourth quarter**

- CAR – Eddy Piñeiro 40-yard field goal, 9:22. Panthers 22–9. **Drive: 11 plays, 54 yards, 5:25.**
- ATL – KhaDarel Hodge 25-yard pass from Marcus Mariota (kick blocked), 2:56. Panthers 22–15. **Drive: 8 plays, 97 yards, 2:22.**
- CAR – Eddy Piñeiro 37-yard field goal, 0:10. Panthers 25–15. **Drive: 4 plays, 0 yards, 1:40.**

**Top passers**

- ATL – Marcus Mariota – 19/30, 186 yards, 2 TD, INT
- CAR – P. J. Walker – 10/16, 108 yards

**Top rushers**

- ATL – Marcus Mariota – 3 rushes, 43 yards
- CAR – D'Onta Foreman – 31 rushes, 130 yards, TD

**Top receivers**

- ATL – Damiere Byrd – 3 receptions, 58 yards
- CAR – Terrace Marshall Jr. – 1 reception, 43 yards

==== Week 11: vs. Chicago Bears ====
Week 11: Chicago Bears at Atlanta Falcons – Game summary

Quarter	1	2	3	4	Total
Bears	7	10	0	7	**24**
**Falcons**	7	10	7	3	**27**

at Mercedes-Benz Stadium, Atlanta, Georgia

- Date: November 20
- Game time: 1:00 p.m. EST
- Game weather: None (retractable roof closed)
- Game attendance: 69,757
- Referee: Tra Blake
- TV announcers (Fox): Joe Davis, Daryl Johnston and Pam Oliver
- Recap, Game Book

Game information

**First quarter**

- ATL – Drake London 2-yard pass from Marcus Mariota (Younghoe Koo kick), 9:37. Falcons 7–0. **Drive: 10 plays, 75 yards, 5:23.**
- CHI – Darnell Mooney 16-yard pass from Justin Fields (Cairo Santos kick), 6:02. Tied 7–7. **Drive: 7 plays, 44 yards, 3:35.**

**Second quarter**

- CHI – Cairo Santos 41-yard field goal, 7:42. Bears 10–7. **Drive: 7 plays, 47 yards, 3:55.**
- CHI – Justin Fields 4-yard run (Cairo Santos kick), 4:31. Bears 17–7. **Drive: 7 plays, 29 yards, 2:53.**
- ATL – Cordarrelle Patterson 103-yard kickoff return (Younghoe Koo kick), 4:18. Bears 17–14. **Drive: 0 plays, 0 yards, 0:13.**
- CHI – Younghoe Koo 40-yard field goal, 0:00. Tied 17–17. **Drive: 7 plays, 32 yards, 1:10.**

**Third quarter**

- ATL – Marcus Mariota 10-yard run (Younghoe Koo kick), 1:48. Falcons 24–17. **Drive: 6 plays, 61 yards, 3:27.**

**Fourth quarter**

- CHI – David Montgomery 2-yard run (Cairo Santos kick), 8:16. Tied 24–24. **Drive: 13 plays, 75 yards, 8:32.**
- ATL – Younghoe Koo 53-yard field goal, 1:47. Falcons 27–24. **Drive: 12 plays, 40 yards, 6:29.**

**Top passers**

- CHI – Justin Fields – 14/21, 153 yards, TD, INT
- ATL – Marcus Mariota – 13/20, 131 yards, TD

**Top rushers**

- CHI – Justin Fields – 18 rushes, 85 yards, TD
- ATL – Tyler Allgeier – 8 rushes, 55 yards

**Top receivers**

- CHI – David Montgomery – 3 receptions, 54 yards
- ATL – Kyle Pitts – 3 reception, 43 yards

==== Week 12: at Washington Commanders ====
Week 12: Atlanta Falcons at Washington Commanders – Game summary

Quarter	1	2	3	4	Total
Falcons	3	7	3	0	**13**
**Commanders**	7	3	6	3	**19**

at FedExField, Landover, Maryland

- Date: November 27
- Game time: 1:00 p.m. EST
- Game weather: Rain, 49 °F (9 °C)
- Game attendance: 53,864
- Referee: Brad Rogers
- TV announcers (Fox): Adam Amin, Mark Schlereth and Kristina Pink
- Recap, Game Book

Game information

**First quarter**

- ATL – Younghoe Koo 47-yard field goal, 8:07. Falcons 3–0. **Drive: 11 plays, 46 yards, 6:53.**
- WSH – Brian Robinson Jr. 14-yard pass from Taylor Heinicke (Joey Slye kick), 3:46. Commanders 7–3. **Drive: 7 plays, 74 yards, 4:21.**

**Second quarter**

- WSH – MyCole Pruitt 4-yard pass from Marcus Mariota (Younghoe Koo kick), 8:26. Falcons 10–7. **Drive: 11 plays, 77 yards, 6:28.**
- WSH – Joey Slye 30-yard field goal, 1:50. Tied 10–10. **Drive: 14 plays, 59 yards, 6:36.**

**Third quarter**

- WSH – John Bates 16-yard pass from Taylor Heinicke (kick failed), 4:03. Commanders 16–10. **Drive: 11 plays, 60 yards, 6:13.**
- ATL – Younghoe Koo 48-yard field goal, 1:17. Commanders 16–13. **Drive: 8 plays, 45 yards, 2:46.**

**Fourth quarter**

- WSH – Joey Slye 45-yard field goal, 9:05. Commanders 19–13. **Drive: 11 plays, 48 yards, 7:12.**

**Top passers**

- ATL – Marcus Mariota – 15/25, 174 yards, TD, INT
- WSH – Taylor Heinicke – 14/23, 138 yards, 2 TD, INT

**Top rushers**

- ATL – Tyler Allgeier – 11 rushes, 54 yards
- WSH – Brian Robinson Jr. – 18 rushes, 105 yards

**Top receivers**

- ATL – Olamide Zaccheaus – 5 receptions, 91 yards
- WSH – Terry McLaurin – 4 receptions, 48 yards

==== Week 13: vs. Pittsburgh Steelers ====
Week 13: Pittsburgh Steelers at Atlanta Falcons – Game summary

Quarter	1	2	3	4	Total
**Steelers**	3	13	3	0	**19**
Falcons	0	6	7	3	**16**

at Mercedes-Benz Stadium, Atlanta, Georgia

- Date: December 4
- Game time: 1:00 p.m. EST
- Game weather: None (retractable roof closed)
- Game attendance: 70,325
- Referee: Ronald Torbert
- TV announcers (CBS): Andrew Catalon and James Lofton
- Recap, Game Book

Game information

**First quarter**

- PIT – Matthew Wright 46-yard field goal, 7:33. Steelers 3–0. **Drive: 16 plays, 47 yards, 7:27.**

**Second quarter**

- PIT – Matthew Wright 46-yard field goal, 13:34. Steelers 6–0. **Drive: 12 plays, 58 yards, 5:23.**
- ATL – Younghoe Koo 50-yard field goal, 9:15. Steelers 6–3. **Drive: 8 plays, 42 yards, 4:19.**
- PIT – Connor Heyward 17-yard pass from Kenny Pickett (Matthew Wright kick), 7:06. Steelers 13–3. **Drive: 4 plays, 75 yards, 2:09.**
- ATL – Younghoe Koo 51-yard field goal, 5:05. Steelers 13–6. **Drive: 5 plays, 42 yards, 2:01.**
- PIT – Matthew Wright 48-yard field goal, 1:29. Steelers 16–6. **Drive: 9 plays, 45 yards, 3:36.**

**Third quarter**

- PIT – Matthew Wright 33-yard field goal, 4:46. Steelers 19–6. **Drive: 14 plays, 75 yards, 7:36.**
- ATL – MyCole Pruitt 7-yard pass from Marcus Mariota (Younghoe Koo kick), 0:43. Steelers 19–13. **Drive: 8 plays, 75 yards, 4:03.**

**Fourth quarter**

- ATL – Younghoe Koo 28-yard field goal, 5:27. Steelers 19–16. **Drive: 16 plays, 64 yards, 9:21.**

**Top passers**

- PIT – Kenny Pickett – 16/28, 197 yards, TD
- ATL – Marcus Mariota – 13/24, 167 yards, TD, INT

**Top rushers**

- PIT – Najee Harris – 17 rushes, 86 yards
- ATL – Cordarrelle Patterson – 11 rushes, 60 yards

**Top receivers**

- PIT – Pat Freiermuth – 3 receptions, 76 yards
- ATL – Drake London – 6 receptions, 95 yards

==== Week 15: at New Orleans Saints ====
Week 15: Atlanta Falcons at New Orleans Saints – Game summary

Quarter	1	2	3	4	Total
Falcons	0	3	7	8	**18**
**Saints**	14	0	7	0	**21**

at Caesars Superdome, New Orleans, Louisiana

- Date: December 18
- Game time: 1:00 p.m. EST/12:00 p.m. CST
- Game weather: None (indoor stadium)
- Game attendance: 70,041
- Referee: Clete Blakeman
- TV announcers (Fox): Adam Amin, Mark Schlereth and Kristina Pink
- Recap, Game Book

Game information

**First quarter**

- NO – Juwan Johnson 19-yard pass from Andy Dalton (Wil Lutz kick), 10:06. Saints 7–0. **Drive: 10 plays, 75 yards, 4:54.**
- NO – Rashid Shaheed 68-yard pass from Taysom Hill (Wil Lutz kick), 8:17. Saints 14–0. **Drive: 2 plays, 73 yards, 0:50.**

**Second quarter**

- ATL – Younghoe Koo 28-yard field goal, 11:15. Saints 14–3. **Drive: 12 plays, 52 yards, 5:51.**

**Third quarter**

- ATL – Tyler Allgeier 5-yard run (Younghoe Koo kick), 14:46. Saints 14–10. **Drive: 8 plays, 75 yards, 4:14.**
- NO – Juwan Johnson 22-yard pass from Andy Dalton (Wil Lutz kick), 3:34. Saints 21–10. **Drive: 11 plays, 75 yards, 7:12.**

**Fourth quarter**

- ATL – Cordarrelle Patterson 3-yard run (Tyler Allgeier run), 7:07. Saints 21–18. **Drive: 8 plays, 32 yards, 4:00.**

**Top passers**

- ATL – Desmond Ridder – 13/26, 97 yards
- NO – Andy Dalton – 11/17, 151 yards, 2 TD

**Top rushers**

- ATL – Tyler Allgeier – 17 rushes, 139 yards, TD
- NO – Alvin Kamara – 21 rushes, 91 yards

**Top receivers**

- ATL – Drake London – 7 receptions, 70 yards
- NO – Rashid Shaheed – 3 receptions, 95 yards, TD

==== Week 16: at Baltimore Ravens ====
Week 16: Atlanta Falcons at Baltimore Ravens – Game summary

Quarter	1	2	3	4	Total
Falcons	0	3	3	3	**9**
**Ravens**	3	11	0	3	**17**

at M&T Bank Stadium, Baltimore, Maryland

- Date: December 24
- Game time: 1:00 p.m. EST
- Game weather: Clear, 17 °F (−8 °C)
- Game attendance: 70,467
- Referee: Bill Vinovich
- TV announcers (Fox): Kenny Albert, Jonathan Vilma and Shannon Spake
- Recap, Game Book

Game information

**First quarter**

- BAL – Justin Tucker 21-yard field goal, 8:02. Ravens 3–0. **Drive: 5 plays, 47 yards, 2:41.**

**Second quarter**

- BAL – Justin Tucker 27-yard field goal, 12:42. Ravens 6–0. **Drive: 7 plays, 47 yards, 3:03.**
- BAL – Demarcus Robinson 6-yard pass from Tyler Huntley (Tyler Huntley run), 2:23. Ravens 14–0. **Drive: 13 plays, 70 yards, 6:49.**
- ATL – Younghoe Koo 32-yard field goal, 0:00. Ravens 14–3. **Drive: 11 plays, 54 yards, 2:23.**

**Third quarter**

- ATL – Younghoe Koo 34-yard field goal, 7:01. Ravens 14–6. **Drive: 17 plays, 63 yards, 7:59.**

**Fourth quarter**

- BAL – Justin Tucker 21-yard field goal, 14:10. Ravens 17–6. **Drive: 6 plays, 55 yards, 2:32.**
- ATL – Younghoe Koo 37-yard field goal, 2:03. Ravens 17–9. **Drive: 9 plays, 35 yards, 2:56.**

**Top passers**

- BAL – Tyler Huntley – 9/17, 115 yards, TD
- ATL – Desmond Ridder– 22/33, 218 yards

**Top rushers**

- BAL – Gus Edwards – 11 rushes, 99 yards
- ATL – Tyler Allgeier – 18 rushes, 74 yards

**Top receivers**

- BAL – Mark Andrews – 3 receptions, 45 yards
- ATL – Drake London – 7 receptions, 96 yards

With this loss, coupled with wins by the New Orleans Saints and Carolina Panthers, the Falcons were eliminated from postseason contention.

==== Week 17: vs. Arizona Cardinals ====
Week 17: Arizona Cardinals at Atlanta Falcons – Game summary

Quarter	1	2	3	4	Total
Cardinals	3	10	3	3	**19**
**Falcons**	0	14	0	6	**20**

at Mercedes-Benz Stadium, Atlanta, Georgia

- Date: January 1
- Game time: 1:00 p.m. EST
- Game weather: None (retractable roof closed)
- Game attendance: 69,269
- Referee: Alex Kemp
- TV announcers (Fox): Jason Benetti, Brady Quinn and Megan Olivi
- Recap, Game Book

Game information

**First quarter**

- ARI – Matt Prater 38-yard field goal, 8:24. Cardinals 3–0. **Drive: 14 plays, 55 yards, 6:36.**

**Second quarter**

- ATL – Tyler Allgeier 5-yard run (Younghoe Koo kick), 13:38. Falcons 7–3. **Drive: 16 plays, 75 yards, 9:46.**
- ARI – Trey McBride 4-yard pass from David Blough (Matt Prater kick), 10:00. Cardinals 10–7. **Drive: 2 plays, 8 yards, 0:36.**
- ATL – Cordarrelle Patterson 5-yard run (Younghoe Koo kick), 1:47. Falcons 14–10. **Drive: 1 plays, 5 yards, 0:04.**
- ARI – Matt Prater 36-yard field goal, 0:02. Falcons 14–13. **Drive: 10 plays, 62 yards, 1:45.**

**Third quarter**

- ARI – Matt Prater 36-yard field goal, 9:00. Cardinals 16–14. **Drive: 11 plays, 81 yards, 3:47.**

**Fourth quarter**

- ATL – Younghoe Koo 27-yard field goal, 9:36. Falcons 17–16. **Drive: 9 plays, 46 yards, 3:51.**
- ARI – Matt Prater 57-yard field goal, 4:57. Cardinals 19–17. **Drive: 11 plays, 36 yards, 4:39.**
- ATL – Younghoe Koo 21-yard field goal, 0:00. Falcons 20–19. **Drive: 12 plays, 72 yards, 4:57.**

**Top passers**

- ARI – David Blough – 24/40, 222 yards, TD
- ATL – Desmond Ridder – 19/26, 169 yards

**Top rushers**

- ARI – James Conner – 16 rushes, 79 yards
- ATL – Tyler Allgeier – 20 rushes, 83 yards

**Top receivers**

- ARI – Trey McBride – 7 receptions, 78 yards, TD
- ATL – MyCole Pruitt – 4 receptions, 49 yards

==== Week 18: vs. Tampa Bay Buccaneers ====
Week 18: Tampa Bay Buccaneers at Atlanta Falcons – Game summary

Quarter	1	2	3	4	Total
Buccaneers	7	10	0	0	**17**
**Falcons**	10	0	10	10	**30**

at Mercedes-Benz Stadium, Atlanta, Georgia

- Date: January 8
- Game time: 1:00 p.m. EST
- Game weather: None (retractable roof closed)
- Game attendance: 69,276
- Referee: Land Clark
- TV announcers (Fox): Adam Amin, Mark Schlereth and Kristina Pink
- Recap, Game Book

Game information

**First quarter**

- TB – Kyle Rudolph 8-yard pass from Tom Brady (Ryan Succop kick), 9:47. Buccaneers 7–0. **Drive: 10 plays, 70 yards, 5:13.**
- ATL – MyCole Pruitt 2-yard pass from Desmond Ridder (Younghoe Koo kick), 3:22. Tied 7–7. **Drive: 9 plays, 91 yards, 4:00.**
- ATL – Younghoe Koo 49-yard field goal, 0:54. Falcons 10–7. **Drive: 4 plays, 3 yards, 1:36.**

**Second quarter**

- TB – Ryan Succop 41-yard field goal, 8:15. Tied 10–10. **Drive: 14 plays, 52 yards, 7:39.**
- TB – Russell Gage 3-yard pass from Blaine Gabbert (Ryan Succop kick), 1:46. Buccaneers 17–10. **Drive: 5 plays, 22 yards, 2:14.**

**Third quarter**

- ATL – Younghoe Koo 24-yard field goal, 10:27. Buccaneers 17–13. **Drive: 9 plays, 69 yards, 4:33.**
- ATL – Olamide Zaccheaus 3-yard pass from Desmond Ridder (Younghoe Koo kick), 0:51. Falcons 20–17. **Drive: 14 plays, 80 yards, 7:58.**

**Fourth quarter**

- ATL – Cordarrelle Patterson 2-yard run (Younghoe Koo kick), 8:07. Falcons 27–17. **Drive: 9 plays, 83 yards, 6:04.**
- ATL – Younghoe Koo 51-yard field goal, 4:00. Falcons 30–17. **Drive: 10 plays, 42 yards, 3:10.**

**Top passers**

- TB – Tom Brady – 13/17, 84 yards, TD
- ATL – Desmond Ridder – 19/30, 224 yards, 2 TD

**Top rushers**

- TB – Giovani Bernard – 7 rushes, 28 yards
- ATL – Tyler Allgeier – 24 rushes, 125 yards

**Top receivers**

- TB – Chris Godwin – 6 receptions, 55 yards
- ATL – Drake London – 6 receptions, 120 yards

Despite this game having no playoff implications for either team, the Falcons beat the Buccaneers 30-17, officially getting the franchise's first ever victory against Tom Brady. The game featured several milestones for the Falcons rookie class. Quarterback Desmond Ridder threw his first (and second) career touchdown pass, running back Tyler Allgeier passed the 1,000 yard rushing mark while setting the franchise rookie record, and wide receiver Drake London passed tight-end Kyle Pitts for the most receptions by a rookie in franchise history. Following their victory and the rest of the Week 18 results, the Falcons secured the 8th spot in the 2023 NFL draft. As of 2025, this remains the last time Atlanta finished dead last in the NFC South

=== Standings ===
==== Division ====
NFC South
	W	L	T	PCT	DIV	CONF	PF	PA	STK
^{(4)} Tampa Bay Buccaneers	8	9	0	.471	4–2	8–4	313	358	L1
Carolina Panthers	7	10	0	.412	4–2	6–6	347	374	W1
New Orleans Saints	7	10	0	.412	2–4	5–7	330	345	L1
Atlanta Falcons	7	10	0	.412	2–4	6–6	365	386	W2

==== Conference ====
NFC
#	Team	Division	W	L	T	PCT	DIV	CONF	SOS	SOV	STK
**Division leaders**
1	Philadelphia Eagles	East	14	3	0	.824	4–2	9–3	.474	.460	W1
2 (Note: San Francisco claimed the No. 2 seed over Minnesota based on conference record (10–2 vs. 8–4).)	San Francisco 49ers	West	13	4	0	.765	6–0	10–2	.417	.414	W10
3	Minnesota Vikings	North	13	4	0	.765	4–2	8–4	.474	.425	W1
4	Tampa Bay Buccaneers	South	8	9	0	.471	4–2	8–4	.503	.426	L1
**Wild cards**
5	Dallas Cowboys	East	12	5	0	.706	4–2	8–4	.507	.485	L1
6	New York Giants	East	9	7	1	.559	1–4–1	4–7–1	.526	.395	L1
7 (Note: Seattle finished ahead of Detroit based on head-to-head victory, claiming the 7th and final playoff spot.)	Seattle Seahawks	West	9	8	0	.529	4–2	6–6	.462	.382	W2
**Did not qualify for the postseason**
8	Detroit Lions	North	9	8	0	.529	5–1	7–5	.535	.451	W2
9	Washington Commanders	East	8	8	1	.500	2–3–1	5–6–1	.536	.449	W1
10	Green Bay Packers	North	8	9	0	.471	3–3	6–6	.524	.449	L1
11 (Note: Carolina finished ahead of New Orleans and Atlanta based on head-to-head record (3–1 vs. 2–2/1–3).)	Carolina Panthers	South	7	10	0	.412	4–2	6–6	.474	.437	W1
12 (Note: New Orleans finished ahead of Atlanta based on head-to-head sweep.)	New Orleans Saints	South	7	10	0	.412	2–4	5–7	.507	.462	L1
13	Atlanta Falcons	South	7	10	0	.412	2–4	6–6	.467	.429	W2
14	Los Angeles Rams	West	5	12	0	.294	1–5	3–9	.517	.341	L2
15	Arizona Cardinals	West	4	13	0	.235	1–5	3–9	.529	.368	L7
16	Chicago Bears	North	3	14	0	.176	0–6	1–11	.571	.480	L10
**Tiebreakers** (Note: When breaking ties for three or more teams under the NFL's rules, they are first broken within divisions, then comparing only the highest-ranked remaining team from each division.)

=== Team leaders ===
Category	Player(s)	Value
Passing yards	Marcus Mariota	2,219
Passing touchdowns	Marcus Mariota	15
Rushing yards	Tyler Allgeier	1,035
Rushing touchdowns	Cordarrelle Patterson	8
Receptions	Drake London	72
Receiving yards	Drake London	866
Receiving touchdowns	Drake London; MyCole Pruitt	4
Points	Younghoe Koo	129
Kickoff return yards	Avery Williams	313
Punt return yards	Avery Williams	296
Tackles	Rashaan Evans	159
Sacks	Grady Jarrett	6.0
Forced fumbles	Arnold Ebiketie	2
Interceptions	Richie Grant; Jaylinn Hawkins; Mykal Walker	2
Pass deflections	A. J. Terrell	9

=== NFL rankings ===
Category	Total points	Points per game	NFL rank (out of 32)
**Offensive points scored**	365	21.5	15th
**Defensive points allowed**	386	22.7	23rd
