= West Forsyth High School (North Carolina) =

American public school in North Carolina

Location
- 1735 Lewisville-Clemmons Road; Clemmons, North Carolina 27012; United States; 36°03′46″N 80°23′15″W

Information
- School type: Public high school secondary school
- Motto: West is Best!
- Founded: 1964 (62 years ago)
- School board: Winston-Salem/Forsyth County Schools
- Superintendent: Catty Moore (Interim)
- CEEB code: 340777
- Principal: Ayonna Sutton-Chaplin
- Teaching staff: 120.83 (FTE)
- Grades: 9–12
- Gender: Co-Educational
- Enrollment: 2,269 (2023-2024)
- Student to teacher ratio: 18.78
- Language: English (with a Spanish ESL program)
- Hours in school day: 8:55 to 3:40
- Campus type: Suburban
- Colors: Dark green and athletic gold
- Athletics: NCHSAA 8A
- Athletics conference: Central Piedmont 7A/8A
- Mascot: Titan
- Team name: Titans
- Newspaper: Zephyr
- Yearbook: Cronus
- Website: www.wsfcs.k12.nc.us/o/wfhs

West Forsyth High School is a four-year public, secondary high school located in the Winston-Salem suburb of Clemmons, North Carolina, United States.

== General ==
West Forsyth is located in Clemmons, a small suburb of Winston-Salem. Located between Interstate 40 and U.S. Route 421, the school mainly serves students of Clemmons with some students from Lewisville and Winston-Salem.

West Forsyth consistently scores highly on standardized tests. In 2007, it was ranked 356th in the Newsweek Top 1000 Best Schools in America. For the 2009–2010 school year, West Forsyth was the highest scoring high school in the county. It was also one of 13 North Carolina high schools in 2009 to receive the distinction of Honor School of Excellence due to high achievement on standardized tests.

At West Forsyth High, students have the opportunity to take Advanced Placement course work and exams. The AP participation rate at West Forsyth High is 57 percent.

The student body is 50 percent male and 50 percent female, and the total minority enrollment is 37 percent.

West Forsyth High is one of 18 high schools in the Winston-Salem/Forsyth County Schools.

== History ==
West Forsyth High School was built in 1964 after the merger of the Winston-Salem School District and Forsyth County School District. It originally served as the new home for students of Southwest High School (now Southwest Elementary), which is located within walking distance from the campus.

In the beginning, only six buildings existed at West (100–600). The early 1970s brought several new additions, including the track, football stadium, and tennis courts. Five more buildings have also been built. The 700 and 900 buildings were constructed in the early 1980s. The Harold B. Simpson Gymnasium, named after West's first principal, was also built during that time. The 1000 building, the only two-story building on campus, was constructed last, in the late 1990s.

A new auditorium (Performing Arts Center) was constructed, replacing the old auditorium in the 600 building, which is now the band room. The 100, 200, 300, 400, and 500 buildings have been remodeled. Two PODS have been put in place as well, which house the school's Army JROTC program. The total budget for the overall upgrading of the facility was $10.5 million. In 2022, the WSFCS school board approved the basketball court located in the Harold B. Simpson Gymnasium to be dedicated and renamed in honor to former student Chris Paul, the basketball court's name was changed to "Chris Paul Court".

== Athletics ==
West Forsyth is a member of the North Carolina High School Athletic Association (NCHSAA) and is classified as a 8A school. The school is a part of the Central Piedmont 7A/8A Conference (CPC). The CPC features many of West's rivals, including R.J. Reynolds High School, East Forsyth High School and Reagan High School. Team and individual state championships have been won in a variety of sports. Listed below are the different sport teams at West Forsyth:

- Fall sports
  - Cross country (boys and girls)
  - Field hockey (girls')
  - Football (varsity and junior varsity)
  - Golf (girls)
  - Soccer (boys) (varsity and junior varsity)
  - Tennis (girls)
  - Volleyball (girls) (varsity and junior varsity)
- Winter sports
  - Basketball (boys and girls) (varsity and junior varsity)
  - Indoor track
  - Swimming & diving (boys and girls)
  - Wrestling (varsity and junior varsity)
- Spring sports
  - Baseball (varsity and junior varsity)
  - Golf (boys)
  - Lacrosse (boys and girls) (varsity and junior varsity)
  - Soccer (girls) (varsity and junior varsity)
  - Softball (varsity and junior varsity)
  - Tennis (boys)
  - Outdoor track (boys and girls)

=== State Championships ===
West Forsyth has won the following NCHSAA team state championships:

- Baseball: 2014 (4A)
- Women's Basketball: 2019 (4A)
- Women's Cross Country: 1994 (4A), 1996 (4A)
- Women's Soccer: 2017 (4A)
- Softball: 2016 (4A)
- Men's Outdoor Track & Field: 2017 (4A)
- Wrestling Dual Team: 2016 (4A), 2017 (4A)

== Extracurricular activities ==
West Forsyth's music programs include chorus, orchestra and band classes. In choral music, West Forsyth's Concert Choir has received a superior rating at the North Carolina Music Educators Association State Festival every year for the past nine years.

In February 2017 the West Forsyth Army JROTC program scored a 99.5/100 on an inspection held every four years. This was among the highest scores in the entire country.

== Notable alumni ==
- Tyrone Anthony — NFL running back
- Pazuzu Algarad — American murderer
- LaQuanda Barksdale — WNBA player
- Norton Barnhill — NBA player
- Jalen Dalton — NFL defensive tackle
- Dale Folwell — current North Carolina State Treasurer and former Speaker pro tempore of the North Carolina House of Representatives
- Neal Hendrix — professional skateboarder
- KJ Henry — NFL defensive tackle, Super Bowl LIX champion with the Philadelphia Eagles
- Byron Hill — songwriter
- Alex McCalister — NFL and Canadian Football League linebacker
- Ja'Quan McMillian — NFL defensive back
- Chris Paul — NBA player, 12x NBA All-Star, 2x Olympic gold medalist and former Wake Forest Demon Deacon
- Tab Thacker — actor and wrestler, won NCAA wrestling national championship at NC State
- Dustie Waring — rhythm guitarist for Between the Buried and Me
- Jared Wilson — NFL center, played collegiately for the Georgia Buldogs
- Chris Young — former member of the United States men's national artistic gymnastics team and 1999 Pan American Games silver medalist
