= Hubert Glenn =

American baseball player

- Pitcher
- Born: July 13, 1916; Lewisville, North Carolina, U.S.
- Died: March 16, 2007 (aged 90); Hickory, North Carolina, U.S.
- Batted: Left Threw: Right

Negro league baseball debut
- 1944, for the Philadelphia Stars

Last appearance
- 1949, for the Indianapolis Clowns
- Stats at Baseball Reference

Teams
- Philadelphia Stars (1943–1945, 1947); New York Black Yankees (1948); Indianapolis Clowns (1949)

Egbert Hubert Glenn (July 13, 1916 – March 16, 2007), nicknamed "Country", was an American Negro league pitcher in the 1940s.

A native of Lewisville, North Carolina, Glenn made had played on several industry teams since the 1930s, but made his Negro leagues debut in 1943 for the Philadelphia Stars. He spent four seasons with Philadelphia, and also played for the New York Black Yankees and Indianapolis Clowns. A tall righty, Glenn was known as a "good ball player" and a "gentleman". He died in Hickory, North Carolina in 2007 at age 90.
