= Lewisville, North Carolina =

Town in North Carolina, United States

- Town
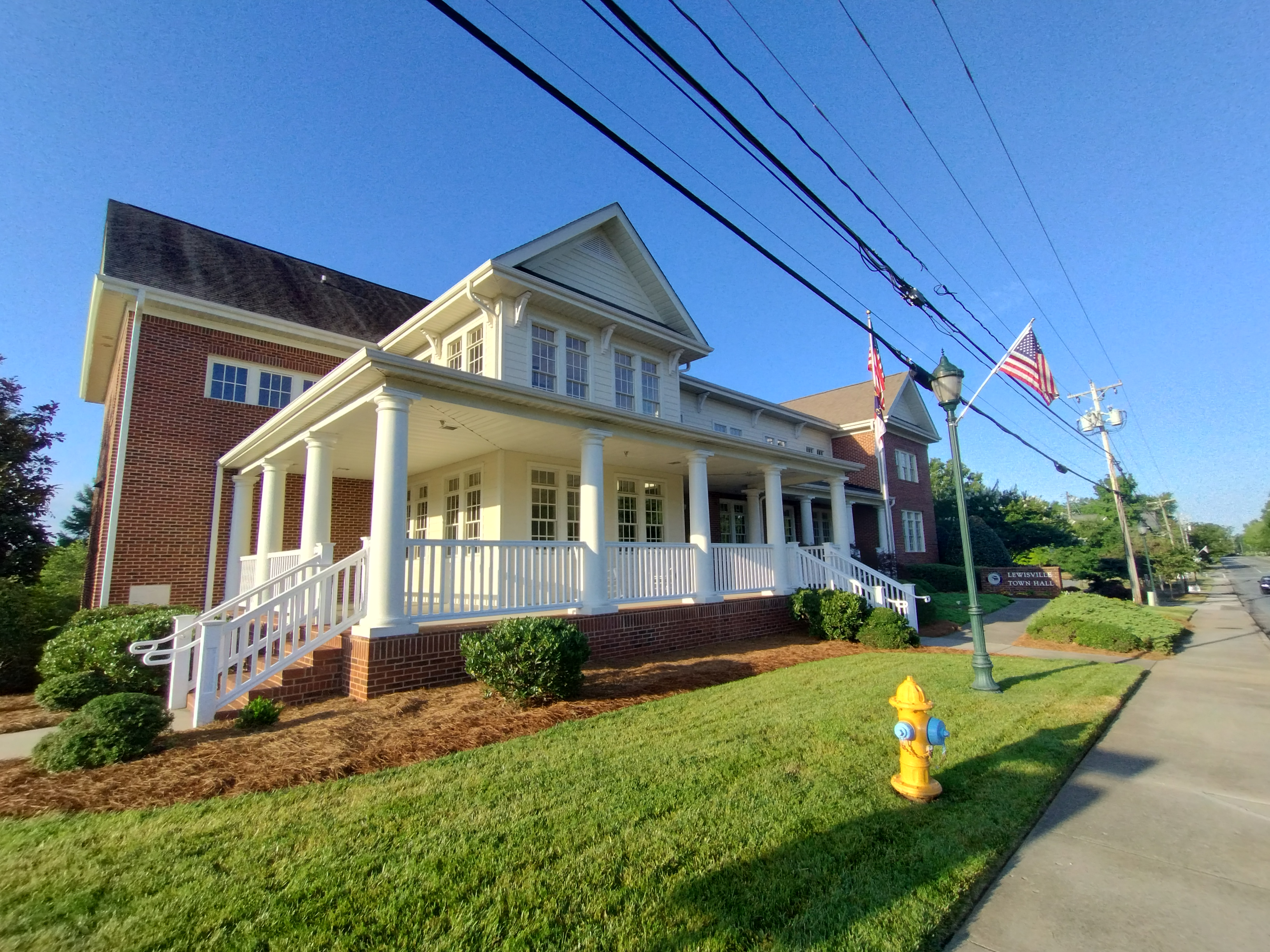
- Lewisville Town Hall

- Location in Forsyth County and the state of North Carolina
- Coordinates: 36°06′11″N 80°25′01″W
- Country: United States
- State: North Carolina
- County: Forsyth
- Incorporated: 1991
- Named for: Lewis Lagenauer

Area
  - Total: 14.75 sq mi (38.19 km^{2})
  - Land: 14.51 sq mi (37.59 km^{2})
  - Water: 0.23 sq mi (0.60 km^{2})
- Elevation: 919 ft (280 m)

Population (2020)
  - Total: 13,381
  - Density: 921.9/sq mi (355.95/km^{2})
- Time zone: UTC-5 (Eastern (EST))
  - Summer (DST): UTC-4 (EDT)
- ZIP code: 27023
- Area code: 336
- FIPS code: 37-38040
- GNIS feature ID: 2406011
- Website: www.lewisvillenc.net

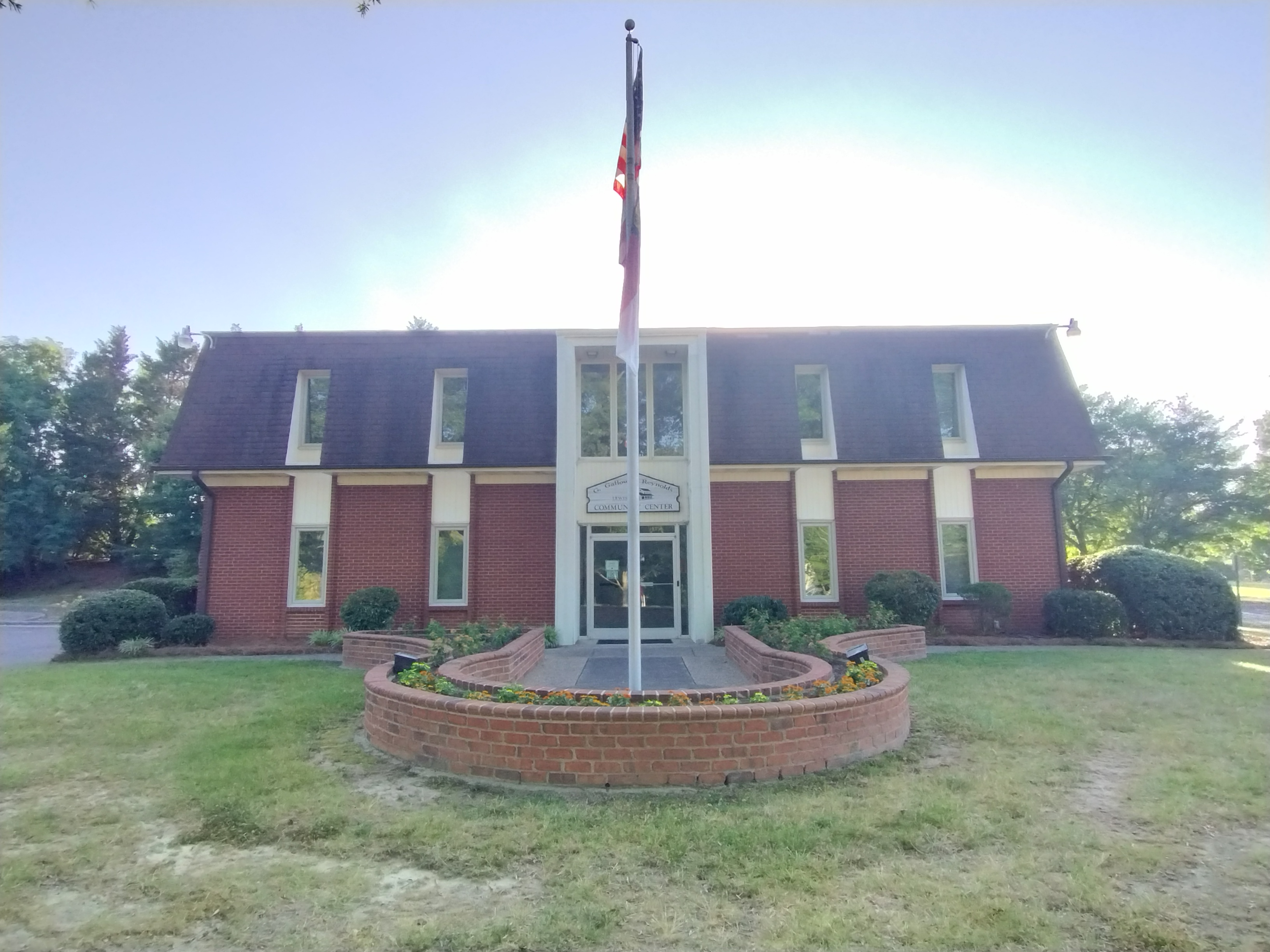
G. Galloway Reynolds Community Center - Lewisville NC

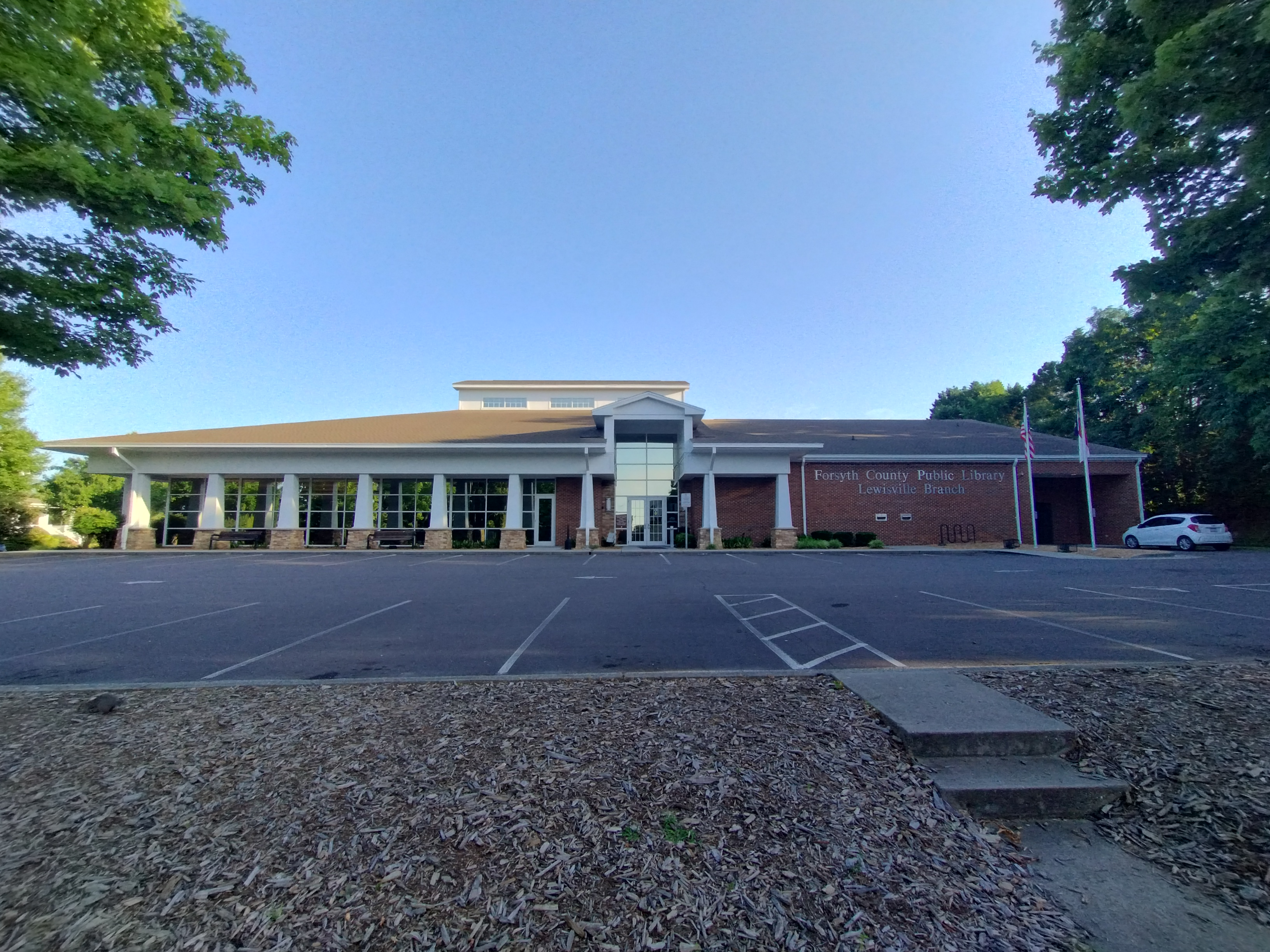
Forsyth County Public Library - Lewisville NC

Lewisville is a town in Forsyth County, North Carolina, United States. The population was 13,388 at the 2020 census, up from 12,639 in 2010. It is a Piedmont Triad community.

== History ==
Lewisville incorporated on August 13, 1991.

== Geography ==
Lewisville is located in West and Northwestern Forsyth County, with the town becoming "annexed" into the northern half of Forsyth County in recent years, abandoning the previous "southwest" quadrant designation inside the county. U.S. Route 421 traverses in the southern areas of the town. Via US 421, downtown Winston-Salem is 11 miles (18 km) to the east, and Wilkesboro is 44 miles (71 km) to the west. US 421 is proposed to become I-777, while the designated-NC 452 (planned to be eventually designated as Interstate 274) would traverse in the outskirts of the town.

According to the United States Census Bureau, the town has a total area of 14.2 square miles (36.8 km^{2}), of which 14.0 square miles (36.2 km^{2}) is land and 0.2 square miles (0.6 km^{2}), or 1.59%, is water.

== Demographics ==
Historical population
Census	Pop.	Note	%±
1880	48		—
1890	439		814.6%
1980	4,547		—
1990	3,206		−29.5%
2000	8,826		175.3%
2010	12,639		43.2%
2020	13,381		5.9%
2025 (est.)	14,421	▲	7.8%
U.S. Decennial Census

=== 2020 census ===
Lewisville racial composition
Race	Number	Percentage
White (non-Hispanic)	11,006	82.25%
Black or African American (non-Hispanic)	722	5.4%
Native American	40	0.3%
Asian	292	2.18%
Pacific Islander	1	0.01%
Other/Mixed	550	4.11%
Hispanic or Latino	770	5.75%

As of the 2020 census, Lewisville had a population of 13,381. There were 5,234 households and 3,924 families in the town.

The median age was 45.0 years. 22.4% of residents were under the age of 18 and 20.8% of residents were 65 years of age or older. For every 100 females there were 93.6 males, and for every 100 females age 18 and over there were 91.7 males age 18 and over.

93.3% of residents lived in urban areas, while 6.7% lived in rural areas.

Of the 5,234 households in Lewisville, 32.2% had children under the age of 18 living in them. Of all households, 62.4% were married-couple households, 12.2% were households with a male householder and no spouse or partner present, and 21.2% were households with a female householder and no spouse or partner present. About 20.6% of all households were made up of individuals and 10.8% had someone living alone who was 65 years of age or older.

There were 5,485 housing units, of which 4.6% were vacant. The homeowner vacancy rate was 1.3% and the rental vacancy rate was 6.0%.

=== 2000 census ===
As of the census of 2000, there were 8,826 people, 3,341 households, and 2,676 families residing in the town. The population density was 822.0 inhabitants per square mile (317.4/km^{2}). There were 3,501 housing units at an average density of 326.0 per square mile (125.9/km^{2}). The racial make-up of the town was 93.11% White, 4.19% African American, 0.19% Native American, 1.34% Asian, 0.54% from other races, and 0.62% from two or more races. Hispanic or Latino of any race were 1.23% of the population.

There were 3,341 households, out of which 40.00% had children under the age of 18 living with them, 70.50% were married couples living together, 7.4% had a female householder with no husband present, and 19.90% were non-families. 16.60% of all households were made up of individuals, and 4.7% had someone living alone who was 65 years of age or older. The average household size was 2.64 and the average family size was 2.98.

In the town, the population was spread out, with 26.8% under the age of 18, 5.80% from 18 to 24, 31.70% from 25 to 44, 27.50% from 45 to 64, and 8.20% who were 65 years of age or older. The median age was 38 years. For every 100 females, there were 98.0 males. For every 100 females aged 18 and over, there were 92.6 males.

The median income for a household in the town was $95,571, and the median income for a family was $72,250. Males had a median income of $50,229 versus $34,496 for females. The per capita income for the town was $29,999. About 1.60% of families and 2.50% of the population were below the poverty line, including 2.00% of those under age 18 and 3.00% of those age 65 or over.

== Education ==
Public schools in Lewisville are managed by the Winston-Salem/Forsyth County Schools school district. Lewisville Elementary School, and Forsyth Country Day School, a private K-12 school, are located in the town.

== Notable people ==
- Austin Dillon (b. 1990), NASCAR driver
- Ty Dillon (b.1992), NASCAR driver
- Neal Hendrix (b. 1973), professional skateboarder
- Chris Paul (b. 1985), NBA player who grew up in Lewisville and attended West Forsyth High School
- Hubert "Country" Glenn, Negro League Baseball Player
