= Jared Wilson (American football) =

American football player (born 2003)

No. 55 – New England Patriots
- Position: Center
- Roster status: Active

Personal information
- Born: June 5, 2003 (age 23)
- Listed height: 6 ft 3 in (1.91 m)
- Listed weight: 310 lb (141 kg)

Career information
- High school: West Forsyth (Clemmons, North Carolina)
- College: Georgia (2021–2024)
- NFL draft: 2025: 3rd round, 95th overall pick

Career history
- New England Patriots (2025–present)

Awards and highlights
- Second-team All-SEC (2024)

Career NFL statistics as of Week 4, 2026
- Games played: 17
- Games started: 17
- Stats at Pro Football Reference

Jared DeShon Wilson (born June 5, 2003) is an American professional football center for the New England Patriots of the National Football League (NFL). He played college football for the Georgia Bulldogs and was selected by the Patriots in the third round of the 2025 NFL draft.

== Early life ==
Wilson attended West Forsyth High School in Clemmons, North Carolina. As a junior in 2019, he was named to the Associated Press all-state team.

Wilson initially committed to play college football at the University of Georgia in November 2019. He reopened his recruitment in February 2020 and committed to the University of North Carolina at Chapel Hill in April. He recommitted to Georgia on August 3, 2020.

== College career ==
Wilson played in 21 games as a backup at Georgia from 2021 to 2023. In 2024, he took over as the starting center. After his 2024 performance, Wilson earned second-team All-SEC honors at center.

== Professional career ==
Pre-draft measurables
Height	Weight	Arm length	Hand span	Wingspan	40-yard dash	10-yard split	20-yard split	20-yard shuttle	Vertical jump	Broad jump	Bench press
6 ft 3 in (1.91 m)	310 lb (141 kg)	32 3/8 in (0.82 m)	10 3/4 in (0.27 m)	6 ft 8 in (2.03 m)	4.84 s	1.72 s	2.86 s	4.56 s	32.0 in (0.81 m)	9 ft 4 in (2.84 m)	23 reps
All values from NFL Combine/Pro Day

The New England Patriots selected Wilson in the third round, with the 95th pick of the 2025 NFL draft (via a trade with the Kansas City Chiefs). In his rookie season, Wilson was the primary starting left guard and played in 13 games. He started in Super Bowl LX, a 29–13 loss to the Seattle Seahawks.
