= Forsyth Country Day School =

School in Lewisville, North Carolina, US

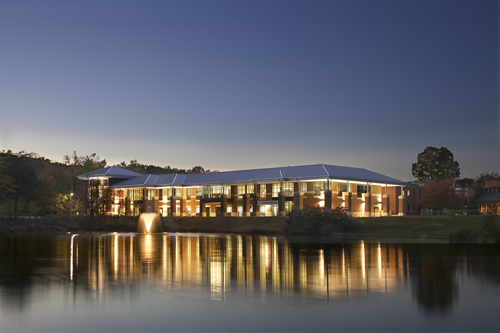
- Forsyth Country Day School in 2004

Location
- 5501 Shallowford Road; Lewisville, North Carolina, Forsyth County, North Carolina 27023; United States; 36°06′04″N 80°23′23″W

Information
- Type: Private, day school
- Established: 1970 (56 years ago)
- CEEB code: 344421
- Head of school: Valorie Baker
- Faculty: 220
- Grades: Preschool–12
- Gender: Co-educational
- Enrollment: 924 (2022)
- Colors: Navy, white, and silver
- Athletics: North Carolina Independent Schools Athletic Association (NCISAA)
- Athletics conference: Piedmont Triad Athletic Conference (PTAC)
- Sports: 40 athletic teams
- Mascot: The Fury
- Nickname: Furies
- Rival: Greensboro Day School; High Point Christian Academy; Weslyan Christian Academy
- Accreditation: SAIS, SACS
- Tuition: $13,900–$23,990 (2019–20)
- Website: www.fcds.org

Forsyth Country Day School (FCDS) is a coeducational private day school located in Lewisville, North Carolina. FCDS was established in 1970.

== Accreditation ==
FCDS is accredited by the Southern Association of Independent Schools (SAIS) and the Southern Association of Colleges and Schools (SACS).

== Athletics ==
FCDS athletic teams are nicknamed the Furies and compete in the Piedmont Triad Athletic Conference (PTAC) and the North Carolina Independent Schools Athletic Association (NCISAA).

== Notable alumni ==
- Kathleen Baker — 100 meter backstroke swimmer who won a gold and silver medal at the 2016 Summer Olympics
- Tanner Beason — Major League Soccer (MLS) player
- Cal Cunningham — American politician, lawyer, and veteran
- Austin Dillon — NASCAR Cup Series driver
- Ty Dillon — NASCAR Cup Series driver; younger brother of Austin Dillon
- MacKenzie Mauzy — actress
- Ian Nelson — actor
- Blake Russell — long-distance runner who represented the United States in the marathon at the 2008 Summer Olympics
- Matt Spear — former college soccer coach and current president of the Richmond Kickers
- Wells Thompson — professional soccer player
- Adam Chase — Contestant on and editor for Jet Lag: The Game
