= Troy Andersen =

American football player (born 1999)

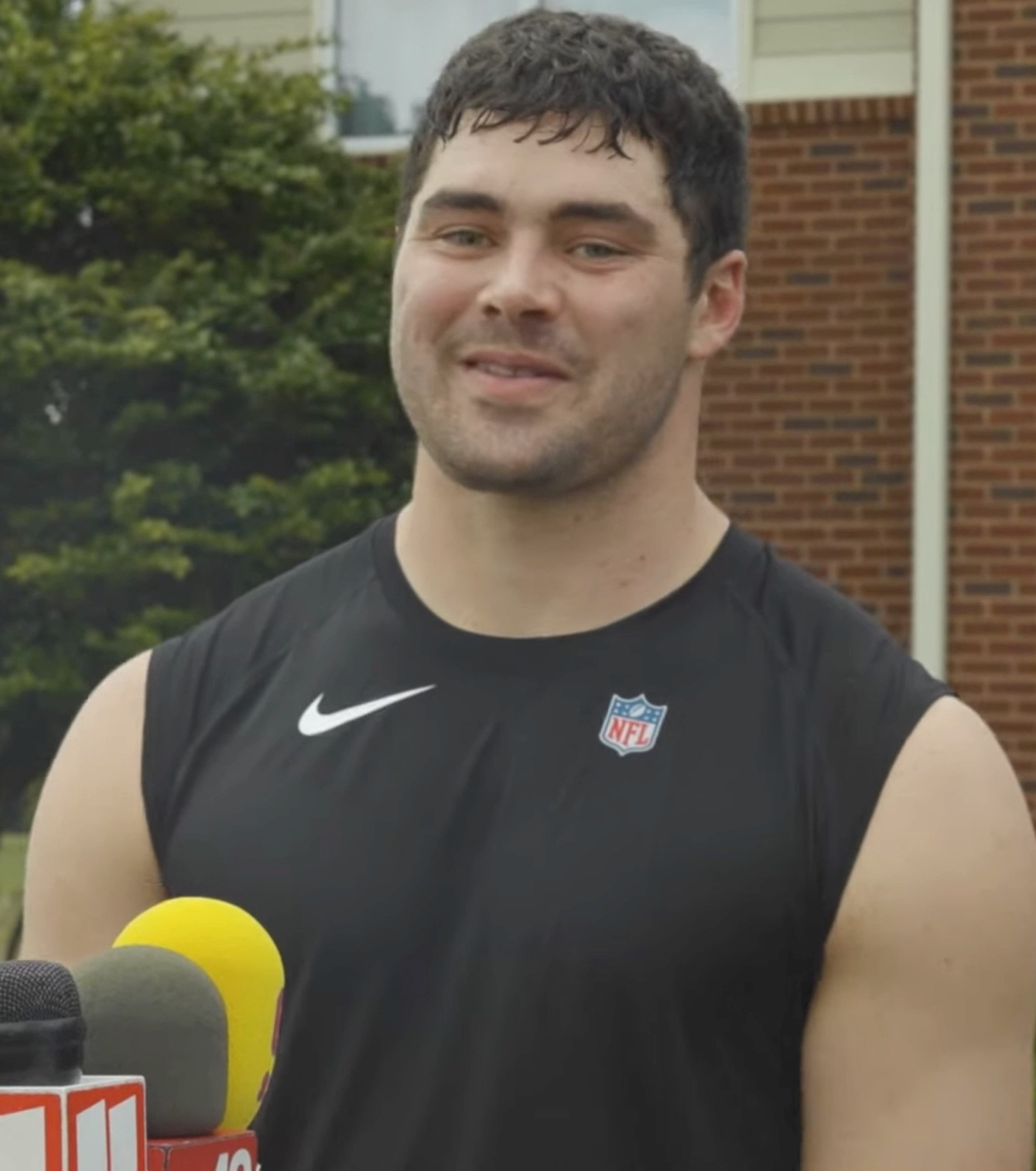
- Andersen in 2022

Profile
- Position: Linebacker

Personal information
- Born: April 23, 1999 (age 27); Dillon, Montana, U.S.
- Listed height: 6 ft 4 in (1.93 m)
- Listed weight: 245 lb (111 kg)

Career information
- High school: Beaverhead County (Dillon)
- College: Montana State (2017–2021)
- NFL draft: 2022: 2nd round, 58th overall pick

Career history
- Atlanta Falcons (2022–2025)

Awards and highlights
- First-team FCS All-American (2021); Big Sky Defensive Player of the Year (2021); Big Sky Freshman of the Year (2017) (Note: Selected as running back); 3× First-team All-Big Sky (2018 (Note: Selected as quarterback)–2021)

Career NFL statistics as of 2025
- Total tackles: 135
- Sacks: 0.5
- Forced fumbles: 1
- Pass deflections: 2
- Interceptions: 1
- Defensive touchdowns: 1
- Stats at Pro Football Reference

Troy Andersen (born April 23, 1999) is an American professional football linebacker. He played college football for the Montana State Bobcats, where he previously played quarterback, running back, and fullback for them before moving to linebacker. He was named a FCS All-American and the Big Sky Conference defensive player of the year in 2021.

== Early life ==
Andersen was born on April 23, 1999, and grew up on his family's cattle ranch in Dillon, Montana. He attended Beaverhead County High School, where he played quarterback and safety for their football team, as well as on their basketball and track teams. As a senior, Andersen was named first-team All-State at quarterback and safety, as well as the Montana Defensive Player of the Year, after he passed for 1,403 yards, rushed for 877 yards, and scored 30 total touchdowns on offense and had 71 tackles with three interceptions and two fumbles recovered on defense while Beaverhead won the Class A state championship.

== College career ==
Andersen started games at both running back and linebacker as a true freshman and was named the Big Sky Conference Freshman of the Year after rushing for 515 yards and five touchdowns with seven receptions for 45 yards and one touchdown on offense and recording nine tackles with one sack on defense. He moved to quarterback before his sophomore season after two-year starter Chris Murray was ruled academically ineligible to play. Andersen completed 115 of 208 passes for 1,195 yards with three touchdowns and seven interceptions and also rushed for 1,412 yards and a school-record 21 touchdowns and was named first-team All-Big Sky.

Andersen moved back to linebacker and also played fullback as a junior. He was named first-team all-conference after finishing the season with 54 tackles, 11.5 for loss, and 6.5 sacks with one interception and five passes broken up. Andersen redshirted his senior season while recovering from injuries. As a redshirt senior, Andersen was named the Big Sky Defensive Player of the Year and was the runner-up for the Buck Buchanan Award. Andersen played in the 2022 Senior Bowl.

== Professional career ==
Pre-draft measurables
Height	Weight	Arm length	Hand span	Wingspan	40-yard dash	10-yard split	20-yard split	20-yard shuttle	Three-cone drill	Vertical jump	Broad jump
6 ft 3 1/2 in (1.92 m)	243 lb (110 kg)	32 1/8 in (0.82 m)	9 1/4 in (0.23 m)	6 ft 5 3/8 in (1.97 m)	4.42 s	1.51 s	2.53 s	4.07 s	6.77 s	36.0 in (0.91 m)	10 ft 8 in (3.25 m)
All values from NFL Combine/Pro Day

Andersen was selected in the second round with the 58th overall pick by the Atlanta Falcons in the 2022 NFL draft. The Falcons previously obtained the pick in the trade that sent Julio Jones to the Tennessee Titans. Andersen made his season debut in Week 2 against the Los Angeles Rams. In Week 6 against the San Francisco 49ers, Andersen made his first professional start, where he had a season-high 13 tackles in the 28–14 win. He finished the season with 69 tackles through 17 games and five starts.

On September 26, 2023, Andersen was placed on injured reserve after suffering a shoulder/pectoral injury in Week 3.

In Week 4 of the 2024 season, Andersen recorded 16 tackles and returned an interception 47 yards for a touchdown in a 26–24 win over the New Orleans Saints, earning NFC Defensive Player of the Week.

Due to being placed on the physically unable to perform (PUP) list at the start of training camp and never being activated for the entire 2025 season, Andersen's contract tolled on what would have been its final year. On March 9, 2026, he agreed to a restructuring that would prevent his contract to toll and pay him $1.54 million in 2026. On August 7, Andersen was released by the Falcons.

== NFL career statistics ==
=== Regular season ===
Year	Team	Games		Tackles					Fumbles				Interceptions			
Year	Team	GP	GS	Cmb	Solo	Ast	Sck	TFL	FF	FR	Yds	TD	Int	Yds	TD	PD
2022	ATL	17	5	69	40	29	0	3	1	0	0	0	0	0	0	1
2023	ATL	2	2	19	7	12	0.5	1	0	0	0	0	0	0	0	0
2024	ATL	7	4	47	28	19	0	1	0	0	0	0	1	47	1	1
Career		26	11	192	75	60	0.5	5	1	0	0	0	1	47	1	2

== Personal life ==
Andersen is a cousin of Major League Baseball pitcher Codi Heuer. His father played college basketball at Eastern Oregon University, while his sister ran track at Montana State. Andersen graduated from Montana State with a degree in agricultural business in May 2021.
