= Damiere Byrd =

American football player (born 1993)

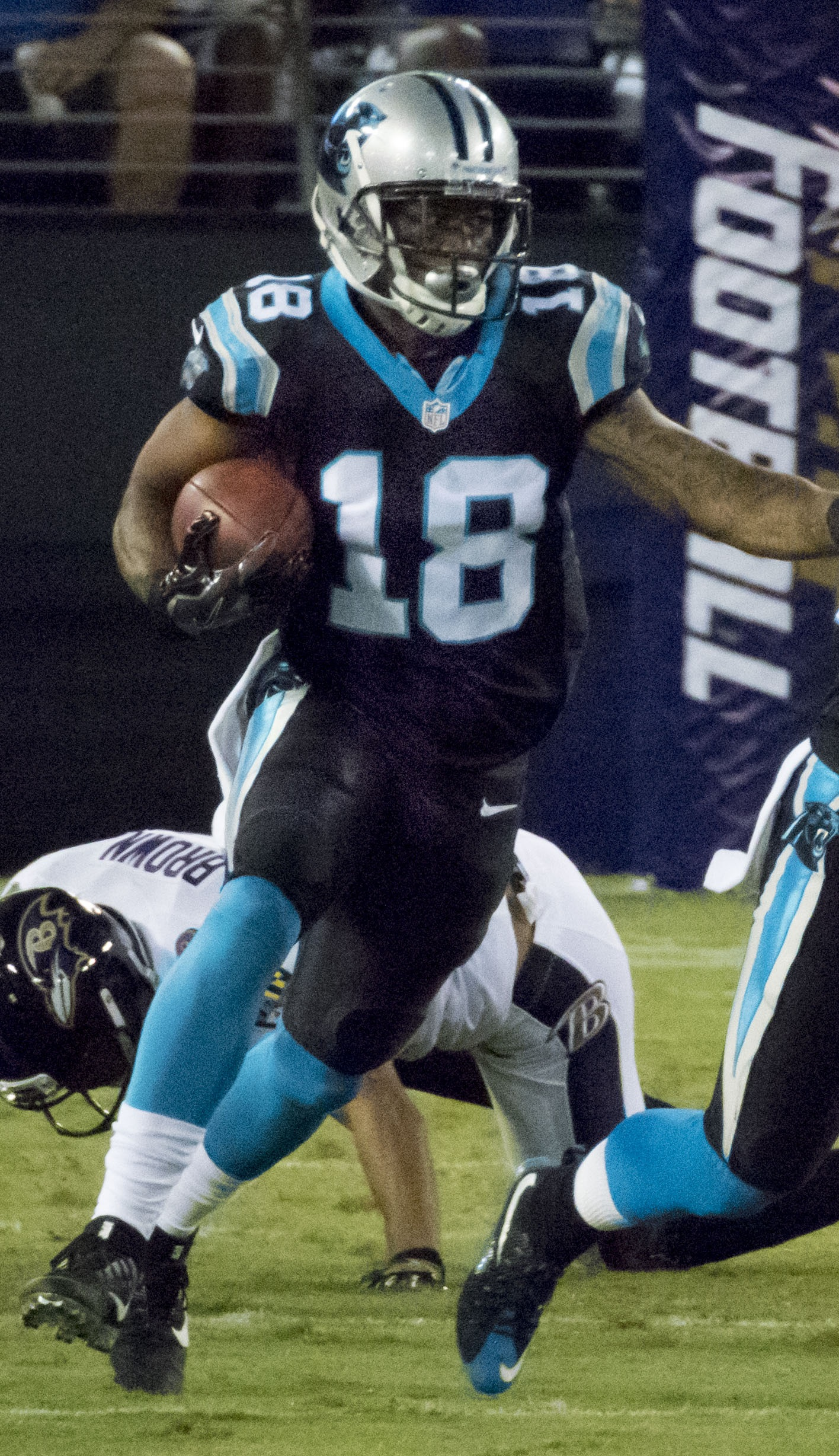
- Byrd with the Carolina Panthers in 2016

Profile
- Position: Wide receiver

Personal information
- Born: January 27, 1993 (age 33); Erial, New Jersey, U.S.
- Listed height: 5 ft 9 in (1.75 m)
- Listed weight: 175 lb (79 kg)

Career information
- High school: Timber Creek (Erial)
- College: South Carolina (2011–2014)
- NFL draft: 2015: undrafted

Career history
- Carolina Panthers (2015–2018); Arizona Cardinals (2019); New England Patriots (2020); Chicago Bears (2021); Atlanta Falcons (2022); Carolina Panthers (2023)*; Atlanta Falcons (2023)*; Houston Texans (2023)*; Washington Commanders (2024)*; Buffalo Bills (2024)*
- * Offseason or practice squad member only

Career NFL statistics as of 2024
- Receptions: 130
- Receiving yards: 1,689
- Receiving touchdowns: 7
- Return yards: 466
- Return touchdowns: 1
- Stats at Pro Football Reference

Damiere Byrd (born January 27, 1993) is an American professional football wide receiver. He played college football for the South Carolina Gamecocks. Byrd signed with the Carolina Panthers as an undrafted free agent in 2015 and has been a member of several other NFL teams.

== College career ==
Byrd played wide receiver for the South Carolina Gamecocks football team as a true freshman in 2011. After his senior season in 2014, Byrd had amassed 1,265 yards on 68 receptions (18.6 yards/catch) with 10 touchdowns in his collegiate career.

Byrd was considered the fastest player on the team while at South Carolina and also competed for the South Carolina track team.

== Professional career ==
=== Pre-draft ===
Pre-draft measurables
| Height | Weight | Arm length | Hand span | 40-yard dash | 10-yard split | 20-yard split | 20-yard shuttle | Three-cone drill | Vertical jump | Broad jump | Bench press |
|---|---|---|---|---|---|---|---|---|---|---|---|
| 5 ft 9 1/8 in (1.76 m) | 173 lb (78 kg) | 29 7/8 in (0.76 m) | 8 in (0.20 m) | 4.28 s | 1.51 s | 2.54 s | 4.03 s | 6.60 s | 42.0 in (1.07 m) | 10 ft 11 in (3.33 m) | 13 reps |
All values from Pro Day

At the South Carolina Pro Day, Byrd only ran the 40-yard dash once, since his left calf muscle tightened up on him. Byrd, having a track & field background, was able to put up impressive numbers, completing the short shuttle in 4.03 seconds, the three-cone in 6.6 seconds and the 60-yard long shuttle in 10.90 seconds, faster than any other time posted at the 2015 scouting combine.

=== Carolina Panthers (first stint) ===
==== 2015 ====
On May 8, 2015, Byrd was signed as an undrafted free agent by the Carolina Panthers. On September 5, 2015, he was released by the Panthers. On September 7, 2015, Byrd was signed to the Panthers' practice squad, where he spent the rest of his rookie season. On February 7, 2016, Byrd's Panthers played in Super Bowl 50. In the game, the Panthers fell to the Denver Broncos by a score of 24–10.

==== 2016 ====
Byrd signed a reserve/futures contract with the Panthers on February 9, 2016.

Byrd made the initial 53-man roster in 2016 but was inactive for the first five games before being released on October 14, 2016. He was re-signed to the practice squad the next day. He was promoted back to the active roster on December 29, 2016.

==== 2017 ====
On October 1, 2017, during the second quarter of a game versus the New England Patriots, Byrd broke his left arm on a reverse play. He was subsequently placed on the injured reserve two days later. He was activated off injured reserve to the active roster on December 2, 2017. In Week 16, Byrd returned a kickoff 103 yards, a franchise record, and scored the Panthers' first kickoff-return touchdown since 2011 which was crucial in the 22–19 win over the Buccaneers, earning him National Football Conference (NFC) Special Teams Player of the Week. However during the second half of the game, Byrd suffered a lower leg injury and subsequently was placed on injured reserve on December 26, 2017.

==== 2018 ====
Byrd entered the 2018 season as the Panthers primary punt returner. He played in eight games before suffering a broken arm in Week 12. He was placed on injured reserve on November 27, 2018.

=== Arizona Cardinals ===
On March 26, 2019, Byrd signed with the Arizona Cardinals. He played in 11 games with three starts, recording a career-high 32 catches for 359 yards and one touchdown.

=== New England Patriots ===
On March 23, 2020, Byrd signed a one-year contract with the New England Patriots.

In Week 11 against the Houston Texans, Byrd recorded six catches for 132 yards and a touchdown during the 27–20 loss.

Byrd finished the season playing in 16 games with 47 receptions, 604 receiving yards, and one receiving touchdown.

=== Chicago Bears ===
On May 4, 2021, Byrd signed with the Chicago Bears. In the Week 14 game against the Green Bay Packers, Byrd caught a 54-yard touchdown pass from Justin Fields.

=== Atlanta Falcons (first stint) ===
On April 1, 2022, Byrd signed a one-year contract with the Atlanta Falcons. On October 22, in Week 7 against the Cincinnati Bengals, Byrd recorded his first touchdown of the season on a 75–yard reception from Marcus Mariota.

=== Carolina Panthers (second stint) ===
On April 14, 2023, Byrd signed with the Panthers. He was placed on injured reserve on August 16, 2023. He was released on August 25.

=== Atlanta Falcons (second stint) ===
On October 19, 2023, Byrd was signed to the Falcons practice squad. He was released on November 22.

=== Houston Texans ===
On January 17, 2024, Byrd was signed to the Houston Texans practice squad. He was not signed to a reserve/future contract after the season and thus became a free agent when his practice squad contract expired.

=== Washington Commanders ===
Byrd signed a one-year contract with the Washington Commanders on May 16, 2024. He was released by Washington on July 31.

=== Buffalo Bills ===
On August 12, 2024, Byrd signed with the Buffalo Bills. He was released on August 25.

== NFL career statistics ==
=== Regular season ===
| Year | Team | Games | | Receiving | | | | | Rushing | | | | | Returning | | | | | Fumbles | |
| Year | Team | GP | GS | Rec | Yds | Avg | Lng | TD | Att | Yds | Avg | Lng | TD | Ret | Yds | Avg | Lng | TD | Fum | Lost |
|---|---|---|---|---|---|---|---|---|---|---|---|---|---|---|---|---|---|---|---|---|
| 2016 | CAR | 1 | 0 | 1 | 16 | 16.0 | 16 | 0 | 0 | 0 | 0.0 | 0 | 0 | 1 | 31 | 31.0 | 31 | 0 | 0 | 0 |
| 2017 | CAR | 8 | 3 | 10 | 105 | 10.5 | 31 | 2 | 1 | 12 | 12.0 | 12 | 0 | 8 | 238 | 29.8 | 103 | 1 | 0 | 1 |
| 2018 | CAR | 8 | 0 | 1 | 8 | 8.0 | 8 | 0 | 0 | 0 | 0.0 | 0 | 0 | 13 | 138 | 10.6 | 30 | 0 | 0 | 0 |
| 2019 | ARI | 11 | 3 | 32 | 359 | 11.2 | 58 | 1 | 0 | 0 | 0.0 | 0 | 0 | 4 | 59 | 14.8 | 23 | 0 | 1 | 0 |
| 2020 | NE | 16 | 14 | 47 | 604 | 12.9 | 42 | 1 | 2 | 15 | 7.5 | 11 | 0 | 2 | 0 | 0.0 | 0 | 0 | 3 | 0 |
| 2021 | CHI | 17 | 4 | 26 | 329 | 12.7 | 54 | 1 | 0 | 0 | 0.0 | 0 | 0 | 1 | 0 | 0.0 | 0 | 0 | 1 | 0 |
| 2022 | ATL | 14 | 4 | 13 | 268 | 20.6 | 75 | 2 | 0 | 0 | 0.0 | 0 | 0 | 0 | 0 | 0.0 | 0 | 0 | 0 | 0 |
| 2023 | ATL | 1 | 0 | did not record any stats | | | | | | | | | | | | | | | | |
| Career | | 76 | 28 | 130 | 1,689 | 13.0 | 75 | 7 | 3 | 27 | 9.0 | 12 | 0 | 29 | 466 | 16.1 | 103 | 1 | 5 | 1 |
