= MyCole Pruitt =

American football player (born 1992)

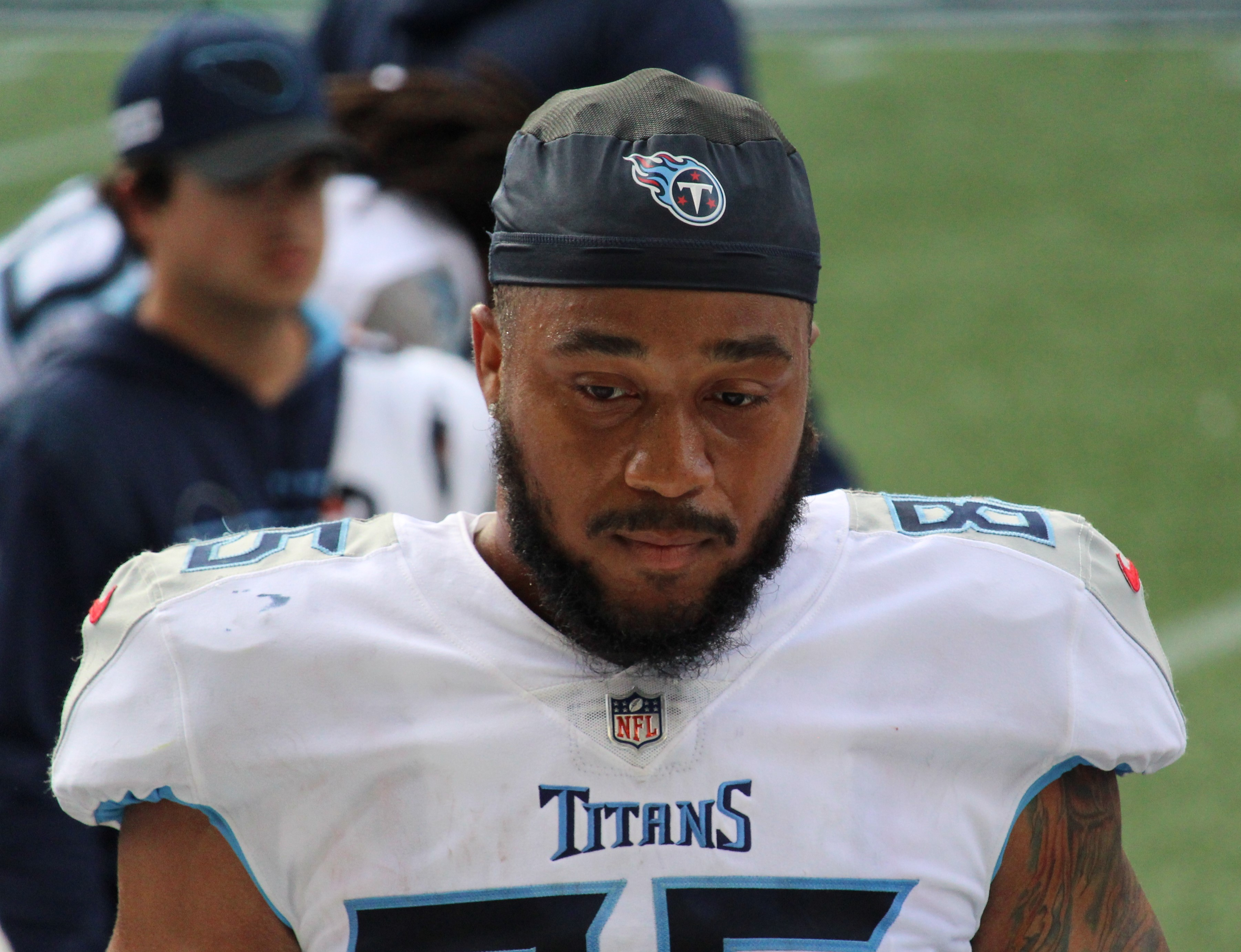
- Pruitt with the Tennessee Titans in 2021

Profile
- Position: Tight end

Personal information
- Born: March 24, 1992 (age 34); South Bend, Indiana, U.S.
- Listed height: 6 ft 2 in (1.88 m)
- Listed weight: 258 lb (117 kg)

Career information
- High school: Kirkwood (Kirkwood, Missouri)
- College: Southern Illinois (2010–2014)
- NFL draft: 2015: 5th round, 143rd overall pick

Career history
- Minnesota Vikings (2015–2016); Chicago Bears (2016); Buffalo Bills (2017)*; Houston Texans (2017–2018); Tennessee Titans (2018–2020); San Francisco 49ers (2021)*; Tennessee Titans (2021); Atlanta Falcons (2022–2023); Pittsburgh Steelers (2024)
- * Offseason or practice squad member only

Awards and highlights
- 2× consensus All-American (2013, 2014); CFPA Tight End of the Year (2013, 2014); 3× first-team All-MVFC (2012–2014); MVFC All-Newcomer team (2011)

Career NFL statistics as of Week 16, 2024
- Receptions: 77
- Receiving yards: 788
- Receiving touchdowns: 13
- Stats at Pro Football Reference

MyCole Pruitt (born March 24, 1992) is an American professional football tight end. He played college football for the Southern Illinois Salukis, where he was a two-time first-team FCS All-American. He was selected by the Minnesota Vikings in the fifth round, 143rd overall of the 2015 NFL draft.

== Early life ==
Pruitt was born to Colette Bonds and Carlos Pruitt on March 24, 1992, in South Bend, Indiana, He went to Kirkwood High School in Kirkwood, Missouri, where he was a three-time All-Conference defensive end and first-team All-Conference tight end in 2009. He attended the same high school as former Philadelphia Eagles and Kansas City Chiefs wide receiver Jeremy Maclin. As a freshman, he caught seven passes for 148 yards and three touchdowns. He led his team to a 10–1 record and made the state playoffs during his sophomore year. He caught 30 passes for 397 yards with six touchdowns and posted 50 tackles (14 for loss) and six sacks, helping his team advance to the second round of the playoffs in his junior season. He was a four-year honor roll student.

In addition, Pruitt played basketball, volleyball and competed in track & field at Kirkwood. He led the hoops team to the 2008–09 district championship. He participated in throws and jumps on the track team, and was a state qualifier in the discus, with a top-throw of 47.90 meters (157 feet, 1 inch). He also posted bests of 13.40 meters (43 feet, 11.75 inches) in the shot put and 5.55 meters (18 feet, 2 inches) in the long jump.

Rivals.com rated Pruitt as a two-star recruit at tight end.

== College career ==
Following high school, Pruitt attended Southern Illinois University (SIU), where he played for the Southern Illinois Salukis football team from 2010 to 2014. He was redshirted for the 2010 season and was named SIU's Offensive Scout Player of the Week during the Quincy game week. He was a consensus NCAA Division I Football Championship (FCS) All-American as a junior and senior. He finished his college football career at SIU as the Missouri Valley Football Conference (MVFC) record holder in career receptions (211), receiving yards (2,601) and receiving touchdowns (25) among tight ends. He graduated in December 2014 with a bachelor's degree in industrial technology.

=== Freshman season ===
As a redshirt freshman in 2011, Pruitt played in 11 games; he hauled in 43 passes for 562 yards and 3 touchdowns, placing eighth in the conference in receptions per game with 3.9 yards and receiving yards per game with 51.1 yards. He was named team receiver MVP by teammates as he led the team in receptions, receiving yards and receiving touchdowns. He earned a spot on the MVFC All-Newcomer team and was also an honorable mention All-MVFC selection.

=== Sophomore season ===
In 2012, Pruitt was a Third-team All-American honoree by The Sports Network and a First-team All-MVFC selection. He started in all 11 games at tight end. He led the team in receptions (49), receiving yards (577) and touchdown receptions (4) for the second consecutive season. His 92 career receptions ranked second in school history by a tight end at the time, while his 49 receptions tied for eighth most in a single-season in school history. He was fourth nationally among tight ends in receiving yards and sixth nationally among tight ends in receptions per game (4.5). He also ranked fifth in the MVFC in receptions and sixth in receiving yards per game (52.5) and led all conference tight ends in both categories. Against Southeast Missouri State, Pruitt posted a career-best nine receptions for 121 yards. On September 17, 2012, Pruitt was named the National Performer of the Week at tight end by the College Football Performance Awards.

=== Junior season ===
Ranked as the top tight end in the FCS by the College Football Performance Awards, Pruitt was named a First-team All-American by the American Football Coaches Association (AFCA), The Sports Network, Associated Press (AP) and FCS Athletic Directors Association as a junior in 2013. He was also a First-team All-MVFC selection. He started 10 games, missing the final two games of the season after playing the second half against Missouri State with a broken leg. He led the MVFC in receptions (48) and receiving yards (601) by a tight end, and was also third in the conference with 4.8 receptions per game and sixth in receiving yards per game (60.1). He posted five touchdown catches, the most by a Saluki since 2008. He finished the season as SIU's all-time leader in career receptions (140) and receiving yards (1,740) by a tight end. He was named the CFPA National Performer of the Week for his performance against Eastern Illinois and was a four-time weekly CFPA tight end honorable mention.

=== Senior season ===
In his final season at SIU in 2014, Pruitt was named a First-team All-American by the AP, AFCA, The Sports Network and Walter Camp Foundation. as well as a First-team All-MVFC selection. He was also selected as the FCS tight end of the year by the College Football Performance Awards. He set a school record in receptions with 81, leading the conference. He had 13 touchdown receptions (including at least one in every MVFC game), which rank second in single-season SIU history, while his 861 receiving yards ranks fifth in single-season SIU history. He ranked 12th in the FCS in receptions per game (6.8) and seventh in touchdown receptions (13). He led the MVFC in receptions per game (6.8) and ranked second in receiving touchdowns (13). He started all 12 games and had three straight 100-yard games. He had 10 receptions and 136 yards at Purdue and also had 10 receptions at Illinois State, becoming the first player since Cornell Craig (1999) with multiple 10+ reception games in a season. He led all Division I tight ends (FBS and FCS) in receptions (by 20), receiving yards (by 141) and receiving touchdowns (by four). He was a three-time CFPA Tight End Performer of the Week (after PUR, WIU and USD games). He was named the best tight end in MVFC history as part of the Valley's 30-year anniversary. For his career, he had a MVFC record 221 receptions for 2,601 yards and 25 touchdowns.

== Professional career ==
=== Pre-draft ===
Prior to the draft, Bleacher Report's Matt Miller listed Pruitt as the seventh-best tight end prospect in his final 2015 rankings. Dane Brugler of CBSSports.com placed him at No. 4, while NFL.com's Lance Zierlein slotted him in at No. 10. He was considered to be a late-Day 2 or Day 3 pick.

Pruitt impressed at the 2015 NFL Scouting Combine; weighing in at 252 pounds, Pruitt ran the 40-yard dash in 4.58 seconds, which was by far the best time among tight ends. He also posted the top vertical jump at the position with a leap of 38.0", and his 9'10" broad jump finished as fourth-best. In the shuttles, he had the third-best time in both the 20-yard (4.37 seconds) and 60-yard (11.85) workouts.

External videos
- Pruitt's NFL Combine workout

Pre-draft measurables
Height	Weight	Arm length	Hand span	40-yard dash	10-yard split	20-yard split	20-yard shuttle	Three-cone drill	Vertical jump	Broad jump	Bench press
6 ft 2 1/4 in (1.89 m)	251 lb (114 kg)	33 1/2 in (0.85 m)	10 1/4 in (0.26 m)	4.58 s	1.63 s	2.70 s	4.37 s	7.25 s	38.0 in (0.97 m)	9 ft 10 in (3.00 m)	17 reps
All values from NFL Combine

=== Minnesota Vikings ===
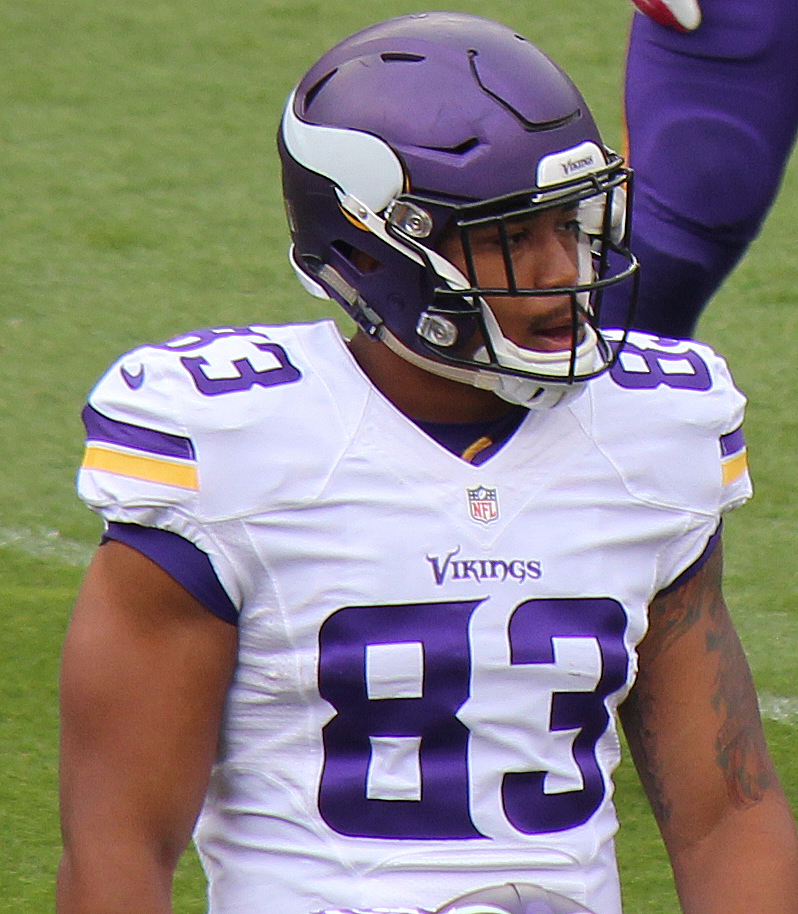
Pruitt with the Minnesota Vikings in 2015

Pruitt was selected by the Minnesota Vikings in the fifth round (143rd overall pick) of the 2015 NFL draft. The pick was part of a trade where the Vikings and Detroit Lions swapped third-round picks, and the Lions sent their fifth-rounder to Minnesota. Pruitt signed a four-year, $2,510,588 deal with the Vikings with a $230,588 signing bonus that was all guaranteed.

During the first two weeks of the 2015 season, Pruitt recorded just four snaps in each game. Against the Lions in Week 7, Pruitt recorded his first NFL catch, a 13-yard gain to convert on third-and-12; needing to get past the 28, Pruitt caught the ball at the Detroit 35, broke two tackles, spun and was hit twice more at the 29–30 but surged forward. He also showed his versatility by delivering a key block that helped running back Adrian Peterson break free for a 75-yard gain. With Rhett Ellison out with a concussion against the Chicago Bears in Week 8, Pruitt saw a season-high 28 snaps out of the 58 offensive plays the Vikings ran in their 23–20 win. He finished the game with two catches for 15 yards. Pruitt had two receptions for a season-high 36 yards in the Vikings' loss to the Arizona Cardinals in Week 14.

Pruitt was released by the Vikings on November 8, 2016, and was later signed to the practice squad.

=== Chicago Bears ===
On December 13, 2016, Pruitt was signed by the Bears off the Vikings' practice squad. He was released by the Bears on September 2, 2017.

=== Buffalo Bills ===
On September 4, 2017, Pruitt was signed to the Buffalo Bills' practice squad. He was released on September 14, 2017.

=== Houston Texans ===
On September 18, 2017, Pruitt was signed to the Houston Texans' practice squad. He was promoted to the active roster on December 5, 2017. He was placed on injured reserve on December 19, 2017.

On September 2, 2018, Pruitt was waived by the Texans and was re-signed to the practice squad.

=== Tennessee Titans (first stint) ===
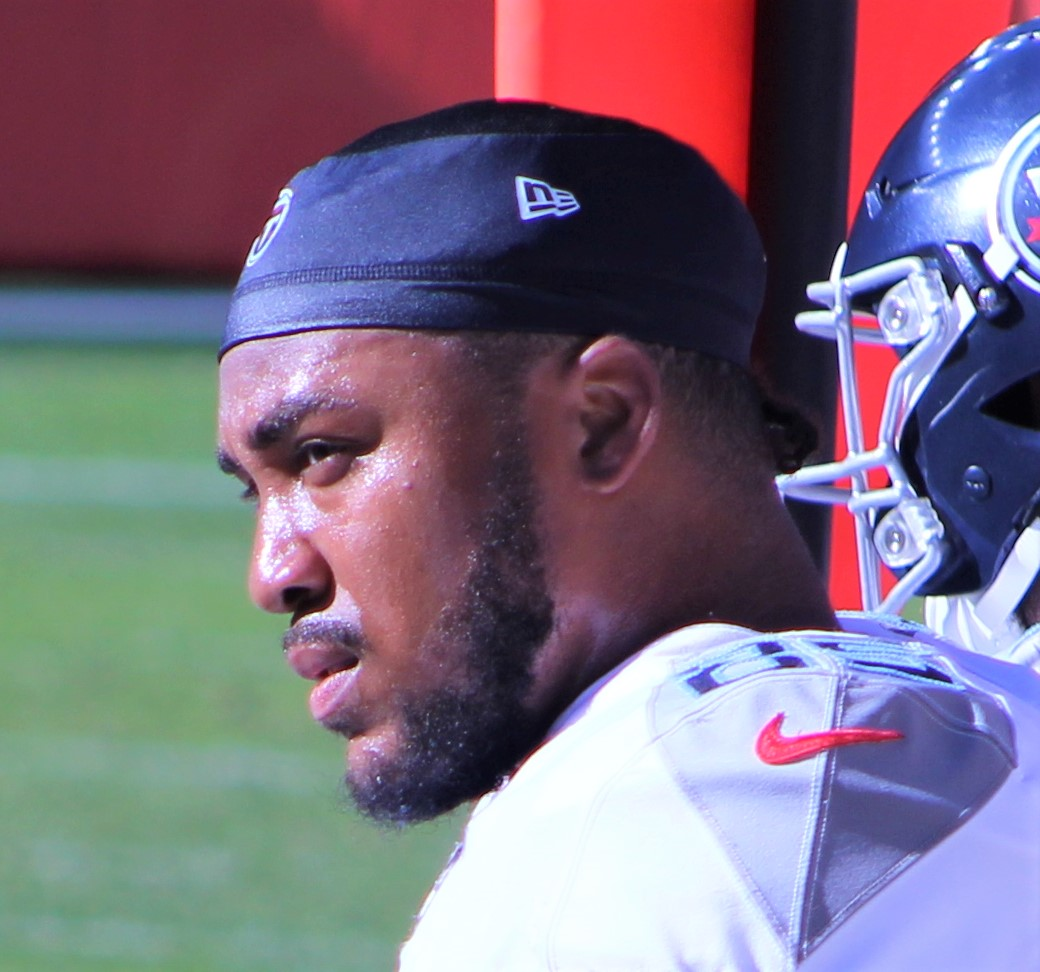
Pruitt with the Titans in 2019

On September 10, 2018, Pruitt was signed by the Tennessee Titans off the Texans practice squad after Delanie Walker suffered a season-ending ankle injury. On November 18, 2018, in a 38-10 Week 11 loss to the Indianapolis Colts, Pruitt caught his first reception of the season for 19 yards. On December 22, 2018, Pruitt caught his first NFL touchdown from Blaine Gabbert in the Titans' 25-16 Week 16 win against the Washington Redskins.

On March 24, 2020, Pruitt was re-signed by the Titans. He was placed on the reserve/COVID-19 list by the team on October 8, and activated from the list on October 20.

=== San Francisco 49ers ===
On June 2, 2021, Pruitt signed with the San Francisco 49ers. He was released on August 31, 2021.

=== Tennessee Titans (second stint) ===
On September 2, 2021, Pruitt was signed to the Titans' practice squad. He was promoted to the active roster on September 13, 2021. In the Week 17 matchup vs. the Miami Dolphins, Pruitt's right leg was rolled up on while he was blocking. He suffered a dislocation and fracture of his right ankle, requiring season ending surgery. He was placed on injured reserve on January 3, 2022. He finished the season with a career-high 14 catches for 145 yards and three touchdowns through 16 games and nine starts.

=== Atlanta Falcons ===
On August 8, 2022, Pruitt signed with the Atlanta Falcons. He was released on August 30 and re-signed to the practice squad. On October 15, 2022, Pruitt was promoted to the active roster for the week six game vs. the San Francisco 49ers. With teammate Casey Hayward being put on IR, Pruitt was promoted to the active 53-man roster on October 18, 2022, the day after scoring a touchdown in Week 6.

Pruitt re-signed with the Falcons on July 25, 2023.

=== Pittsburgh Steelers ===
On April 4, 2024, Pruitt signed with the Pittsburgh Steelers.
