= Neal Hendrix =

Neal Hendrix (born May 12, 1973) is an American professional skateboarder, commentator, and brand manager.

== Skateboarding career ==
Hendrix grew up in Lewisville, North Carolina, and started skating backyards and parks across the Mid-Atlantic in 1986. In 1991 he turned pro for New Deal and two years later moved to southern California.

Career highlights include five X Games medals and earning titles in 2005 at the Skatepark of Tampa Pro Vert Contest and China's' Shanghai Showdown. Hendrix ranked 2nd in the 2007 World Cup of Skateboarding and Pro Vert World Rankings. He also skated for 11-years on the Vans Warped Tour. Hendrix was a featured skater on Tony Hawk’s Boom Boom Huck jam and has demoed with Hawk and his crew.

In 1996, Hendrix skated in the Olympic Games closing ceremonies in Atlanta, Georgia. In 2016 he won Vert Attack X in Sweden and placed 3rd at the GoPro Beach Bowl in Australia.

In October 2018, Hendrix was suspended from his role on the USA Skateboarding executive committee pending a police investigation into sexual assault allegations. In November 2018, The Orange County district attorney declined to pursue a case against Hendrix after allegations of improper sexual contact with a then-14-year-old skateboarder.

== Other career highlights ==
Hendrix started out as a visiting pro at Woodward Camp in Pennsylvania back in the 1990s. He remained a visiting pro for many years and is now the Brand Manager for the camps worldwide, which include camps in Pennsylvania, California, China and Colorado. Camp Woodward placed Hendrix on administrative leave while the sexual assault investigation was conducted, later absolving him.

He is a broadcaster and commentator for various skateboard contests and series including Dew Tour, X Games and the upcoming VANS World Championship Series. Hendrix was formerly a reporter for Fuel TV's The Weekly Update.

Hendrix is a photographer in his free time, documenting the various cities and countries he has visited through his sport. He has had several photography exhibits in the surrounding Los Angeles area including the Lab, in Costa Mesa and UCLA's Kerckhoff Gallery.
