= Caleb Huntley =

American football player (born 1998)

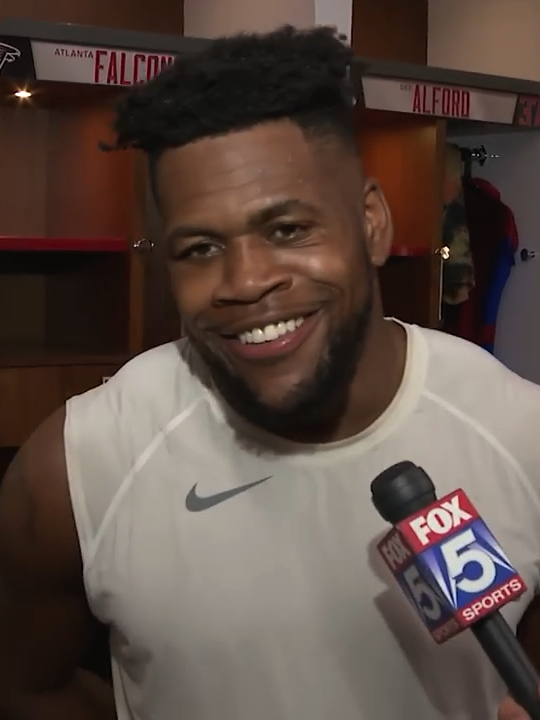
- Huntley in 2022

No. 42
- Position: Running back

Personal information
- Born: September 15, 1998 (age 28); Locust Grove, Georgia, U.S.
- Listed height: 5 ft 10 in (1.78 m)
- Listed weight: 229 lb (104 kg)

Career information
- High school: Locust Grove
- College: Ball State (2017–2020)
- NFL draft: 2021: undrafted

Career history
- Atlanta Falcons (2021–2022)

Awards and highlights
- 2× All-Mid-American Conference (2019, 2020)

Career NFL statistics
- Rushing yards: 366
- Rushing average: 4.8
- Rushing touchdowns: 1
- Stats at Pro Football Reference

Caleb Jarod Huntley (born September 15, 1998) is an American former professional football player who was a running back for the Atlanta Falcons of the National Football League (NFL). He played college football for the Ball State Cardinals and was signed by the Falcons as an undrafted free agent in 2021.

== Early life and college ==
Huntley was born on September 15, 1998, and grew up in Atlanta, Georgia. He attended Locust Grove High School and was a four-year letterman. He played four seasons as a varsity football player at running back and finished his career with 3,135 yards and 30 touchdowns. As a senior in 2016, he ran for 1,487 yards and scored 13 touchdowns, earning Region 4/5A Offensive Player of the Year honors. He recorded more than 100 rushing yards in every game of the 2016 season, and holds the single season rushing record and rushing yards per game record at Locust Grove. He was a three-star recruit according to 247Sports.

Huntley had committed to Western Kentucky, but they decided not to have him on the team as a result of poor grades in high school. He instead signed with Ball State. As a freshman in 2017, he appeared in all 12 games and started the concluding seven, recording 1,003 rushing yards on 210 attempts, both leading the team. He is one of only two freshmen in school history to run for over 1,000 yards. He was given the John Hodge Award at the end of the year, given to the best Ball State freshman.

As a sophomore in 2018, Huntley appeared in the first six games before suffering a season-ending injury against Northern Illinois. In 2019, Huntley started 11 out of 12 games at running back and recorded 1,275 rushing yards, placing third in the Mid-American Conference (MAC) with 106.2 rushing yards per game. Gaining over 100 yards in all but one of the inter-conference matches, Huntley was named second-team All-MAC at the end of the year as well as Ball State Offensive Player of the Year.

As a senior in 2020, Huntley recorded 437 rushing yards on 80 carries, scoring six touchdowns. He appeared in only three games due to injury, but, despite this, played well enough to earn a spot on the all-conference team. Although being given an extra year of eligibility due to the COVID-19 pandemic, he decided to declare for the NFL draft. Huntley finished his college career with 2,902 rushing yards, seventh all-time in school history, and 21 rushing touchdowns, which ranks tenth in the team record books.

== Professional career ==
Pre-draft measurables
Height	Weight	Arm length	Hand span	40-yard dash	10-yard split	20-yard split	Vertical jump	Broad jump	Bench press
5 ft 9 5/8 in (1.77 m)	210 lb (95 kg)	32 3/8 in (0.82 m)	9 3/8 in (0.24 m)	4.77 s	1.63 s	2.75 s	35.5 in (0.90 m)	9 ft 2 in (2.79 m)	15 reps
All values from Pro Day

After going unselected in the 2021 NFL draft, Huntley was signed by the Atlanta Falcons as an undrafted free agent. He was waived at the final roster cuts, on August 31, and re-signed to the practice squad the next day. He spent the entire season there, and was signed to a future contract on January 10, 2022.

Huntley was waived again on August 30, 2022, but was subsequently brought back to the practice squad. He was elevated to the active roster for their week two game against the Los Angeles Rams, and made his debut in the match, recording one rush attempt for three yards. He was elevated again for week four, and recorded 10 carries for 56 yards and his first and only career touchdown in a 23–20 win over the Cleveland Browns. He was signed to the active roster on October 3. He suffered a torn Achilles tendon in Week 15 and was placed on injured reserve on December 20. Huntley ended the 2022 season with 76 carries for 366 rushing yards and one touchdown.

Huntley was waived by the Falcons on July 25, 2023.
