= Jalen Dalton =

American football player (born 1997)

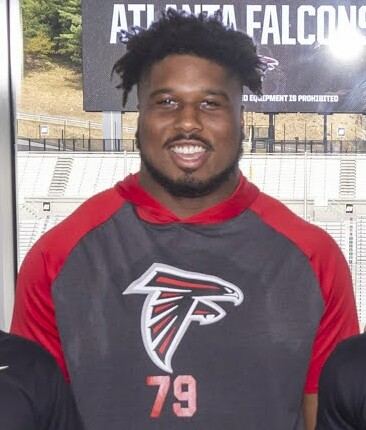
- Dalton with the Atlanta Falcons in 2022

Profile
- Position: Defensive end

Personal information
- Born: August 5, 1997 (age 29); Clemmons, North Carolina, U.S.
- Listed height: 6 ft 6 in (1.98 m)
- Listed weight: 300 lb (136 kg)

Career information
- High school: West Forsyth (Clemmons)
- College: North Carolina (2015–2018)
- NFL draft: 2019: undrafted

Career history
- Chicago Bears (2019)*; New Orleans Saints (2019–2021); Atlanta Falcons (2022); Carolina Panthers (2023)*; Seattle Sea Dragons (2024)*; San Antonio Brahmas (2024); Dallas Cowboys (2024)*
- * Offseason or practice squad member only

Career NFL statistics
- Total tackles: 13
- Stats at Pro Football Reference

Jalen Dalton (born August 5, 1997) is an American professional football defensive end. He played college football for the North Carolina Tar Heels and was signed by the Chicago Bears as an undrafted free agent in 2019. He has also spent time with the New Orleans Saints and Atlanta Falcons.

== Early life and education ==
Dalton was born on August 4, 1997, in Clemmons, North Carolina. He attended West Forsyth High School where he was a first-team all-state selection. Rivals.com ranked him the fourth-best defensive end recruit nationally and the best player in the state. After graduating, he announced his commitment to play college football at the University of North Carolina in November 2014.

Among North Carolina's highest recruits, Dalton appeared in nine games as a true freshman, recording 15 tackles. He was considered "lean" for his position at 250 pounds, and increased his weight to 290 for the 2016 season, describing his diet as "eat whatever." As a sophomore that year, he made an appearance in all of the school's 13 games and was a starter in two of them, making a total of 27 tackles, including 1.5 for-loss, a blocked kick, and a fumble recovery.

As a junior in 2017, Dalton started three games and appeared in six additional, finishing the year with 28 tackles, three sacks and 8.0 TFLs, the latter of which placed second on the team. Dalton appeared in seven games as a senior, and made 23 tackles, 3.5 sacks and 4.5 TFLs. He finished his college career with 93 total tackles and 6.5 sacks.

== Professional career ==
Pre-draft measurables
Height	Weight	Arm length	Hand span	40-yard dash	10-yard split	20-yard split	20-yard shuttle	Three-cone drill	Vertical jump	Broad jump	Bench press
6 ft 5 3/4 in (1.97 m)	283 lb (128 kg)	34 1/8 in (0.87 m)	8 3/4 in (0.22 m)	4.81 s	1.78 s	2.78 s	4.56 s	7.45 s	32.5 in (0.83 m)	9 ft 10 in (3.00 m)	21 reps
All values from Pro Day

=== Chicago Bears ===
After going unselected in the 2019 NFL draft, Dalton was signed by the Chicago Bears as an undrafted free agent, following a successful rookie minicamp. He was waived at the final roster cuts, on August 31.

=== New Orleans Saints ===
On December 18, 2019, he was signed to the practice squad of the New Orleans Saints. He was signed to a futures contract on January 6, 2020. He suffered a season-ending injury in August 2020.

In 2021, Dalton appeared to be heading towards a final roster spot with the Saints, but suffered another season-ending injury. He was released by New Orleans on May 3, 2022, having not appeared in a single game in his four seasons with the team.

=== Atlanta Falcons ===
On June 16, 2022, Dalton was signed by the Atlanta Falcons. He suffered an injury in preseason and was released with an injury settlement shortly afterwards.

On October 18, 2022, Dalton was re-signed to the Falcons' practice squad. He was elevated to the active roster for a week eight game against the Carolina Panthers, and made his NFL debut in the 37–34 win, recording one tackle. He was signed to the active roster on November 5. He finished the season with seven games played and 13 total tackles.

Dalton was waived on June 7, 2023.

=== Carolina Panthers ===
On June 8, 2023, Dalton was claimed off waivers by the Carolina Panthers. However, Dalton was waived by Carolina with a failed physical designation on June 12.

=== Seattle Sea Dragons ===
On October 30, 2023, Dalton signed with the Seattle Sea Dragons of the XFL. The Sea Dragons folded when the XFL and USFL merged to create the United Football League (UFL).

=== San Antonio Brahmas ===
On January 5, 2024, Dalton was drafted by the San Antonio Brahmas during the 2024 UFL dispersal draft. He was placed on Injured reserve on May 14.

=== Dallas Cowboys ===
On October 16, 2024, Dalton signed with the Dallas Cowboys practice squad.
