= 2021 Atlanta Falcons season =

56th season in franchise history

- Owner: Arthur Blank
- General manager: Terry Fontenot
- Head coach: Arthur Smith
- Home stadium: Mercedes-Benz Stadium

Results
- Record: 7–10
- Division place: 3rd NFC South
- Playoffs: Did not qualify
- All-Pros: CB A. J. Terrell (2nd team); LS Josh Harris (2nd team)
- Pro Bowlers: TE Kyle Pitts; LS Josh Harris

Uniform
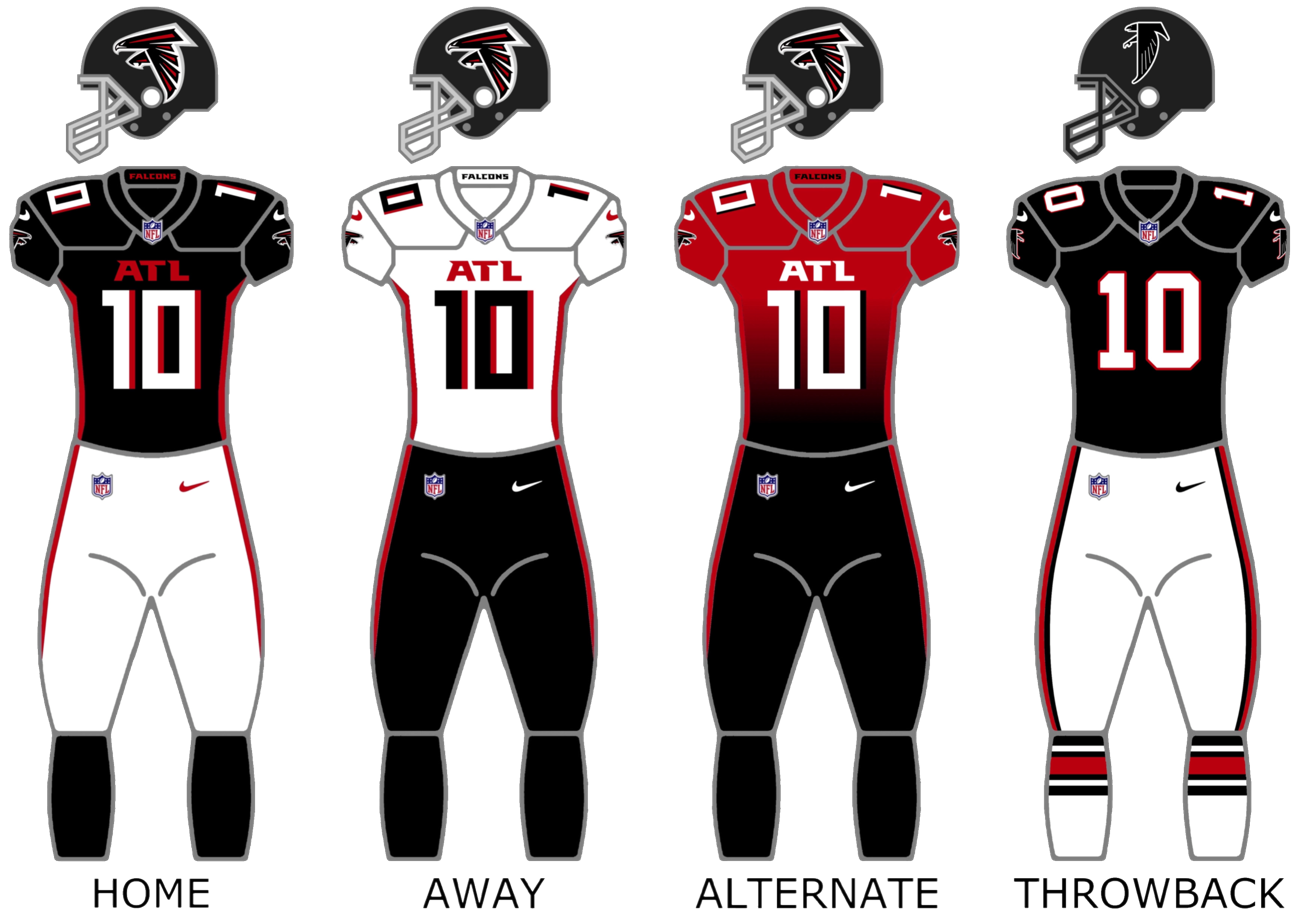

The 2021 season was the Atlanta Falcons' 56th season in the National Football League (NFL), their fifth playing their home games at Mercedes-Benz Stadium and their first under general manager Terry Fontenot and head coach Arthur Smith.

For the first time since 2010, wide receiver Julio Jones was not on the roster as he was traded to the Tennessee Titans on June 6, 2021. Jones departed Atlanta holding the most career receiving yards and receptions in Falcons franchise history.

Following their Week 12 win over the Jacksonville Jaguars, the Falcons improved their 4–12 season from the previous year. However, the Falcons were eliminated from playoff contention for the fourth consecutive year following a Week 17 loss to the Buffalo Bills.

It was also their final season with quarterback Matt Ryan, who had been with the team since 2008, as he was traded to the Indianapolis Colts for the following season. The Falcons also got rid of Calvin Ridley after the season.

== Draft ==
2021 Atlanta Falcons Draft
Round	Selection	Player	Position	College	Notes
1	4	Kyle Pitts	TE	Florida	Highest selected tight end in NFL history
2	40	Richie Grant	S	UCF	from Denver Broncos
3	68	Jalen Mayfield	OG	Michigan	
4	108	Darren Hall	CB	San Diego State	
4	114	Drew Dalman	C	Stanford	from Denver Broncos
5	148	Ta'Quon Graham	DE	Texas	
5	182	Adetokunbo Ogundeji	DE	Notre Dame	
5	183	Avery Williams	CB	Boise State	
6	187	Frank Darby	WR	Arizona State	

Notes

- The Falcons were awarded 3 compensatory picks in the 2021 NFL draft.
- The Falcons traded their second-round (35th overall) and sixth-round (219th overall) picks to the Denver Broncos in exchange for their second-round (40th overall) and fourth-round (114th overall) selections.
- All of the Falcons selections in this draft made the 53-man roster at the start of the regular season.

== Staff ==
2021 Atlanta Falcons staff
Front office: Owner/chairman – Arthur Blank; President/CEO – Rich McKay; General manager – Terry Fontenot; Vice president of player personnel – Kyle Smith; Director of pro personnel – Shepley Heard; Director of coaching operations – Brian Griffin; Director of college scouting – Anthony Robinson; Director of player personnel – Steve Sabo; Senior director of football administration – Chris Olsen; National scouts – Ruston Webster, Phil Emery, and Joel Collier; Head coaches: Head coach – Arthur Smith; Offensive coaches: Offensive coordinator – Dave Ragone; Quarterbacks – Charles London; Running backs – Des Kitchings; Wide receivers – Dave Brock; Tight ends – Justin Peelle; Offensive line – Dwayne Ledford; Assistant offensive line – Chandler Henley; Offensive assistant – Danny Breyer; Passing game specialist – T. J. Yates	Defensive coaches: Defensive coordinator – Dean Pees; Defensive line – Gary Emanuel; Linebackers – Frank Bush; Outside linebackers – Ted Monachino; Secondary – Jon Hoke; Assistant defensive backs – Nick Perry; Defensive assistant – Lanier Goethie; Defensive assistant – Matt Pees; Special teams coaches: Special teams coordinator – Marquice Williams; Senior assistant – Steve Hoffman; Strength and conditioning: Head strength and conditioning – Thomas Stallworth; Assistant strength and conditioning – Bobby Thomas; Assistant strength and conditioning – Roderick Moore Jr

== Final roster ==
2021 Atlanta Falcons roster
Quarterbacks (QB): 15 Feleipe Franks; 16 Josh Rosen; 2 Matt Ryan; Running backs (RB): 28 Mike Davis; 30 Qadree Ollison; 84 Cordarrelle Patterson; 40 Keith Smith; Wide receivers (WR): 13 Christian Blake; 88 Frank Darby; 14 Russell Gage; 4 Tajae Sharpe; 82 Austin Trammell; 17 Olamide Zaccheaus; Tight ends (TE): 46 Parker Hesse; 81 Hayden Hurst; 8 Kyle Pitts; 85 Lee Smith	Offensive linemen (OL): 68 Josh Andrews G; 67 Drew Dalman C/G; 66 Colby Gossett G/T; 61 Matt Hennessy C; 71 Rick Leonard T; 63 Chris Lindstrom G; 70 Jake Matthews T; 77 Jalen Mayfield G; 76 Kaleb McGary T; Defensive linemen (DL): 50 John Cominsky DE; 90 Marlon Davidson DE; 96 Tyeler Davison NT; 95 Ta'Quon Graham DE; 97 Grady Jarrett DE; 98 Mike Pennel NT; 94 Anthony Rush NT	Linebackers (LB): 53 Daren Bates ILB; 51 Brandon Copeland OLB; 6 Dante Fowler OLB; 45 Deion Jones ILB; 55 Steven Means OLB; 92 Ade Ogundeji OLB; 54 Foyesade Oluokun ILB; 93 James Vaughters OLB; 3 Mykal Walker ILB; Defensive backs (DB): 27 Richie Grant SS; 34 Darren Hall CB; 21 Duron Harmon SS; 32 Jaylinn Hawkins FS; 22 Fabian Moreau CB; 20 Kendall Sheffield CB; 24 A. J. Terrell CB; 35 Avery Williams CB; 36 Shawn Williams FS; Special teams (ST): 47 Josh Harris LS; 7 Younghoe Koo K; 19 Thomas Morstead P	Practice squad: 29 Cornell Armstrong CB; 12 Matt Barkley QB; 72 Willie Beavers T; 56 Quinton Bell OLB; 49 Jordan Brailford OLB; 48 Dorian Etheridge ILB; 83 Chad Hansen WR; 42 Caleb Huntley RB; 33 Luther Kirk SS; 37 Dom Maggio P; 64 Ryan Neuzil G; 38 Lafayette Pitts CB; 89 John Raine TE; 59 Rashad Smith ILB; 79 Nick Thurman DE; Reserve: 99 Jonathan Bullard DE (COVID-19); 52 Emmanuel Ellerbee ILB; 73 Matt Gono T (PUP); 87 Jaeden Graham TE (IR); 23 Erik Harris FS (IR); 5 A. J. McCarron QB (IR); 26 Isaiah Oliver CB (IR); 18 Calvin Ridley WR (NF-Inj.); 69 Jason Spriggs T (COVID-19); Rookies in italics 54 active, 9 reserve, 15 practice squad

== Preseason ==
Week	Date	Opponent	Result	Record	Venue	Recap
1	August 13	Tennessee Titans	L 3–23	0–1	Mercedes-Benz Stadium	Recap
2	August 21	at Miami Dolphins	L 17–37	0–2	Hard Rock Stadium	Recap
3	August 29	Cleveland Browns	L 10–19	0–3	Mercedes-Benz Stadium	Recap

== Regular season ==
=== Schedule ===
The Falcons' 2021 schedule was announced on May 12. They opened the season at home against the Philadelphia Eagles.

Week	Date	Opponent	Result	Record	Venue	Recap
1	September 12	Philadelphia Eagles	**L** 6–32	0–1	Mercedes-Benz Stadium	Recap
2	September 19	at **Tampa Bay Buccaneers**	**L** 25–48	0–2	Raymond James Stadium	Recap
3	September 26	at New York Giants	**W** 17–14	1–2	MetLife Stadium	Recap
4	October 3	Washington Football Team	**L** 30–34	1–3	Mercedes-Benz Stadium	Recap
5	October 10	New York Jets	**W** 27–20	2–3	(United Kingdom) Tottenham Hotspur Stadium (London)	Recap
6	Bye					
7	October 24	at Miami Dolphins	**W** 30–28	3–3	Hard Rock Stadium	Recap
8	October 31	**Carolina Panthers**	**L** 13–19	3–4	Mercedes-Benz Stadium	Recap
9	November 7	at **New Orleans Saints**	**W** 27–25	4–4	Caesars Superdome	Recap
10	November 14	at Dallas Cowboys	**L** 3–43	4–5	AT&T Stadium	Recap
11	November 18	New England Patriots	**L** 0–25	4–6	Mercedes-Benz Stadium	Recap
12	November 28	at Jacksonville Jaguars	**W** 21–14	5–6	TIAA Bank Field	Recap
13	December 5	**Tampa Bay Buccaneers**	**L** 17–30	5–7	Mercedes-Benz Stadium	Recap
14	December 12	at **Carolina Panthers**	**W** 29–21	6–7	Bank of America Stadium	Recap
15	December 19	at San Francisco 49ers	**L** 13–31	6–8	Levi's Stadium	Recap
16	December 26	Detroit Lions	**W** 20–16	7–8	Mercedes-Benz Stadium	Recap
17	January 2	at Buffalo Bills	**L** 15–29	7–9	Highmark Stadium	Recap
18	January 9	**New Orleans Saints**	**L** 20–30	7–10	Mercedes-Benz Stadium	Recap

Note: Intra-division opponents are in bold text.

=== Game summaries ===
==== Week 1: vs. Philadelphia Eagles ====
Week 1: Philadelphia Eagles at Atlanta Falcons – Game summary

Quarter	1	2	3	4	Total
**Eagles**	7	8	7	10	**32**
Falcons	3	3	0	0	**6**

at Mercedes-Benz Stadium, Atlanta, Georgia

- Date: September 12
- Game time: 1:00 p.m. EDT
- Game weather: Fair, 81 °F (27 °C) — retractable roof open
- Game attendance: 68,633
- Referee: Scott Novak
- TV announcers (Fox): Kevin Burkhardt, Greg Olsen and Pam Oliver
- Recap, Game Book

Game information

**First quarter**

- ATL – Younghoe Koo 21-yard field goal, 9:58. Falcons 3–0. **Drive: 14 plays, 72 yards, 5:02.**
- PHI – DeVonta Smith 18-yard pass from Jalen Hurts (Jake Elliott kick), 6:17. Eagles 7–3. **Drive: 7 plays, 75 yards, 3:41.**

**Second quarter**

- ATL – Younghoe Koo 27-yard field goal, 14:52. Eagles 7–6. **Drive: 15 plays, 74 yards, 6:25.**
- PHI – Dallas Goedert 9-yard pass from Jalen Hurts (Miles Sanders run), 0:02. Eagles 15–6. **Drive: 12 plays, 62 yards, 1:42.**

**Third quarter**

- PHI – Kenneth Gainwell 8-yard run (Jake Elliott kick), 1:25. Eagles 22–6. **Drive: 6 plays, 50 yards, 2:59.**

**Fourth quarter**

- PHI – Jalen Reagor 23-yard pass from Jalen Hurts (Jake Elliott kick), 4:20. Eagles 29–6. **Drive: 2 plays, 22 yards, 1:19.**
- PHI – Jake Elliott 43-yard field goal, 1:10. Eagles 32–6. **Drive: 4 plays, 6 yards, 2:03.**

**Top passers**

- PHI – Jalen Hurts – 27/35, 264 yards, 3 TD
- ATL – Matt Ryan – 21/35, 164 yards

**Top rushers**

- PHI – Miles Sanders – 15 rushes, 74 yards
- ATL – Cordarrelle Patterson – 7 rushes, 54 yards

**Top receivers**

- PHI – DeVonta Smith – 6 receptions, 71 yards, TD
- ATL – Calvin Ridley – 5 receptions, 51 yards

The Falcons start their season off with a 26-point loss to the Philadelphia Eagles.

==== Week 2: at Tampa Bay Buccaneers ====
Week 2: Atlanta Falcons at Tampa Bay Buccaneers – Game summary

Quarter	1	2	3	4	Total
Falcons	0	10	15	0	**25**
**Buccaneers**	7	14	7	20	**48**

at Raymond James Stadium, Tampa, Florida

- Date: September 19
- Game time: 4:05 p.m. EDT
- Game weather: Cloudy, 83 °F (28 °C)
- Game attendance: 63,694
- Referee: Carl Cheffers
- TV announcers (Fox): Kevin Burkhardt, Greg Olsen and Pam Oliver
- Recap, Game Book

Game information

**First quarter**

- TB – Rob Gronkowski 20-yard pass from Tom Brady (Ryan Succop kick), 12:22. Buccaneers 7–0. **Drive: 6 plays, 75 yards, 2:38**

**Second quarter**

- TB – Rob Gronkowski 1-yard pass from Tom Brady (Ryan Succop kick), 14:07. Buccaneers 14–0. **Drive: 5 plays, 46 yards, 1:54**
- ATL – Cordarrelle Patterson 10-yard run (Younghoe Koo kick), 11:48. Buccaneers 14–7. **Drive: 5 plays, 66 yards, 2:19**
- TB – Mike Evans 3-yard pass from Tom Brady (Ryan Succop kick), 0:43. Buccaneers 21–7. **Drive: 8 plays, 85 yards, 3:31**
- ATL – Younghoe Koo 36-yard field goal, 0:00. Buccaneers 21–10. **Drive: 4 plays, 47 yards, 0:43**

**Third quarter**

- TB – Mike Evans 1-yard pass from Tom Brady (Ryan Succop kick), 12:43. Buccaneers 28–10. **Drive: 4 plays, 18 yards, 1:36**
- ATL – Calvin Ridley 3-yard pass from Matt Ryan (Younghoe Koo kick), 6:35. Buccaneers 28–17. **Drive: 13 plays, 75 yards, 6:08**
- ATL – Cordarrelle Patterson 7-yard pass from Matt Ryan (Matt Ryan run), 1:45. Buccaneers 28–25. **Drive: 6 plays, 46 yards, 2:56**

**Fourth quarter**

- TB – Chris Godwin 12-yard pass from Tom Brady (Ryan Succop kick), 9:18. Buccaneers 35–25. **Drive: 3 plays, 43 yards, 1:35**
- TB – Mike Edwards 31-yard interception return (kick failed), 7:53. Buccaneers 41–25.
- TB – Mike Edwards 15-yard interception return (Ryan Succop kick), 4:01. Buccaneers 48–25.

**Top passers**

- ATL – Matt Ryan – 35/46, 300 yards, 2 TD, 3 INT
- TB – Tom Brady – 24/36, 276 yards, 5 TD

**Top rushers**

- ATL – Mike Davis – 9 rushes, 38 yards
- TB – Leonard Fournette – 11 rushes, 52 yards

**Top receivers**

- ATL – Kyle Pitts – 5 receptions, 73 yards
- TB – Mike Evans – 5 receptions, 76 yards, 2 TD

==== Week 3: at New York Giants ====
Week 3: Atlanta Falcons at New York Giants – Game summary

Quarter	1	2	3	4	Total
**Falcons**	0	7	0	10	**17**
Giants	3	3	0	8	**14**

at MetLife Stadium, East Rutherford, New Jersey

- Date: September 26
- Game time: 1:00 p.m. EDT
- Game weather: Sunny, 70 °F (21 °C)
- Game attendance: 75,307
- Referee: Adrian Hill
- TV announcers (Fox): Kenny Albert, Jonathan Vilma and Sara Walsh
- Recap, Game Book

Game information

**First quarter**

- NYG – Graham Gano 25-yard field goal, 6:58. Giants 3–0. **Drive: 11 plays, 73 yards, 5:16.**

**Second quarter**

- NYG – Graham Gano 31-yard field goal, 8:13. Giants 6–0. **Drive: 15 plays, 73 yards, 7:38.**
- ATL – Olamide Zaccheaus 4-yard pass from Matt Ryan (Younghoe Koo kick), 1:33. Falcons 7–6. **Drive: 6 plays, 44 yards, 0:36.**

**Third quarter**

- No scoring plays.

**Fourth quarter**

- NYG – Saquon Barkley 1-yard run (Daniel Jones run), 12:53. Giants 14–7. **Drive: 10 plays, 71 yards, 5:10.**
- ATL – Lee Smith 1-yard pass from Matt Ryan (Younghoe Koo kick), 4:13. Tied 14–14. **Drive: 15 plays, 72 yards, 8:40.**
- ATL – Younghoe Koo 40-yard field goal, 0:00. Falcons 17–14. **Drive: 7 plays, 58 yards, 1:50.**

**Top passers**

- ATL – Matt Ryan – 27/36, 243 yards, 2 TD
- NYG – Daniel Jones – 24/35, 266 yards

**Top rushers**

- ATL – Mike Davis – 12 rushes, 50 yards
- NYG – Saquon Barkley – 16 rushes, 51 yards, TD

**Top receivers**

- ATL – Cordarrelle Patterson – 6 receptions, 82 yards
- NYG – Kenny Golladay – 4 receptions, 64 yards

==== Week 4: vs. Washington Football Team ====
Week 4: Washington Football Team at Atlanta Falcons – Game summary

Quarter	1	2	3	4	Total
**Washington**	0	13	9	12	**34**
Falcons	3	14	6	7	**30**

at Mercedes-Benz Stadium, Atlanta, Georgia

- Date: October 3
- Game time: 1:00 p.m. EDT
- Game weather: Cloudy, 76 °F (24 °C) (retractable roof open)
- Game attendance: 68,333
- Referee: Clay Martin
- TV announcers (Fox): Kevin Kugler, Mark Sanchez, and Laura Okmin
- Recap, Game Book

Game information

**First quarter**

- ATL – Younghoe Koo 25-yard field goal, 7:00. Falcons 3–0. **Drive: 15 plays, 68 yards, 8:00.**

**Second quarter**

- ATL – Cordarrelle Patterson 42-yard pass from Matt Ryan (Younghoe Koo kick), 11:07. Falcons 10–0. **Drive: 4 plays, 64 yards, 2:06.**
- WAS – Terry McLaurin 33-yard pass from Taylor Heinicke (Dustin Hopkins kick), 7:55. Falcons 10–7. **Drive: 7 plays, 77 yards, 3:12.**
- WAS – Antonio Gibson 2-yard run (kick failed), 2:04. Football Team 13–10. **Drive: 7 plays, 63 yards, 4:03.**
- ATL – Cordarrelle Patterson 12-yard pass from Matt Ryan (Younghoe Koo kick), 0:14. Falcons 17–13. **Drive: 11 plays, 75 yards, 1:50.**

**Third quarter**

- WAS – DeAndre Carter 101-yard kickoff return (kick failed), 14:47. Football Team 19–17. **Drive: 0 plays, 0 yards, 0:13.**
- ATL – Cordarrelle Patterson 14-yard pass from Matt Ryan (pass failed), 11:09. Falcons 23–19. **Drive: 8 plays, 68 yards, 3:38.**
- WAS – Dustin Hopkins 21-yard field goal, 5:31. Falcons 23–22. **Drive: 14 plays, 73 yards, 5:38.**

**Fourth quarter**

- ATL – Mike Davis 7-yard pass from Matt Ryan (Younghoe Koo kick), 14:52. Falcons 30–22. **Drive: 13 plays, 83 yards, 5:39.**
- WAS – Terry McLaurin 17-yard pass from Taylor Heinicke (pass failed), 3:52. Falcons 30–28. **Drive: 10 plays, 70 yards, 6:08.**
- WAS – J. D. McKissic 30-yard pass from Taylor Heinicke (run failed), 0:33. Football Team 34–30. **Drive: 7 plays, 76 yards, 1:14.**

**Top passers**

- WAS – Taylor Heinicke – 23/33, 290 yards, 3 TD
- ATL – Matt Ryan – 25/42, 283 yards, 4 TD

**Top rushers**

- WAS – Antonio Gibson – 14 rushes, 63 yards, TD
- ATL – Cordarrelle Patterson – 6 rushes, 34 yards

**Top receivers**

- WAS – Terry McLaurin – 6 receptions, 123 yards, 2 TD
- ATL – Cordarrelle Patterson – 5 receptions, 82 yards, 3 TD

==== Week 5: vs. New York Jets ====
NFL London games

Week 5: New York Jets at Atlanta Falcons – Game summary

Quarter	1	2	3	4	Total
Jets	0	3	6	11	**20**
**Falcons**	10	10	0	7	**27**

at Tottenham Hotspur Stadium, London, England

- Date: October 10
- Game time: 1:30 p.m. BST/9:30 a.m. EDT
- Game weather: Mostly cloudy, 63 °F (17 °C)
- Game attendance: 60,589
- Referee: Tony Corrente
- TV announcers (NFLN): Greg Gumbel, Adam Archuleta, AJ Ross, and Melissa Stark
- Recap, Game Book

Game information

**First quarter**

- ATL – Younghoe Koo 31-yard field goal, 8:46. Falcons 3–0. **Drive: 14 plays, 62 yards, 6:14.**
- ATL – Kyle Pitts 2-yard pass from Matt Ryan (Younghoe Koo kick), 1:42. Falcons 10–0. **Drive: 10 plays, 92 yards, 5:16.**

**Second quarter**

- ATL – Hayden Hurst 17-yard pass from Matt Ryan (Younghoe Koo kick), 11:01. Falcons 17–0. **Drive: 8 plays, 77 yards, 3:59.**
- NYJ – Matt Ammendola 31-yard field goal, 2:14. Falcons 17–3. **Drive: 16 plays, 74 yards, 7:43.**
- ATL – Younghoe Koo 52-yard field goal, 0:00. Falcons 20–3. **Drive: 10 plays, 42 yards, 2:14.**

**Third quarter**

- NYJ – Ty Johnson 1-yard run (kick failed), 10:56. Falcons 20–9. **Drive: 7 plays, 29 yards, 4:04.**

**Fourth quarter**

- NYJ – Michael Carter 2-yard run (Zach Wilson-Jamison Crowder pass), 6:55. Falcons 20–17. **Drive: 4 plays, 90 yards, 2:35.**
- ATL – Mike Davis 3-yard run (Younghoe Koo kick), 2:19. Falcons 27–17. **Drive: 9 plays, 75 yards, 4:36.**
- NYJ – Matt Ammendola 49-yard field goal, 0:17. Falcons 27–20. **Drive: 12 plays, 44 yards, 2:02.**

**Top passers**

- NYJ – Zach Wilson – 19/32, 192 yards, INT
- ATL – Matt Ryan – 33/45, 342 yards, 2 TD

**Top rushers**

- NYJ – Michael Carter – 10 rushes, 38 yards, TD
- ATL – Cordarrelle Patterson – 14 rushes, 54 yards

**Top receivers**

- NYJ – Corey Davis – 4 receptions, 45 yards
- ATL – Kyle Pitts – 9 receptions, 119 yards, TD

==== Week 7: at Miami Dolphins ====
Week 7: Atlanta Falcons at Miami Dolphins – Game summary

Quarter	1	2	3	4	Total
**Falcons**	0	13	7	10	**30**
Dolphins	7	0	7	14	**28**

at Hard Rock Stadium, Miami Gardens, Florida

- Date: October 24
- Game time: 1:00 p.m. EDT
- Game weather: Partly cloudy, 86 °F (30 °C)
- Game attendance: 62,739
- Referee: Scott Novak
- TV announcers (Fox): Chris Myers, Daryl Johnston and Jen Hale
- Recap, Game Book

Game information

**First quarter**

- MIA – Isaiah Ford 10-yard pass from Tua Tagovailoa (Jason Sanders kick), 7:53. Dolphins 7–0. **Drive: 14 plays, 75 yards, 7:07.**

**Second quarter**

- ATL – Younghoe Koo 33-yard field goal, 14:13. Dolphins 7–3. **Drive: 11 plays, 68 yards, 5:25.**
- ATL – Calvin Ridley 5-yard pass from Matt Ryan (Younghoe Koo kick), 4:47. Falcons 10–7. **Drive: 10 plays, 61 yards, 5:09.**
- ATL – Younghoe Koo 36-yard field goal, 0:04. Falcons 13–7. **Drive: 6 plays, 62 yards, 0:32.**

**Third quarter**

- ATL – Russell Gage 49-yard pass from Matt Ryan (Younghoe Koo kick), 13:53. Falcons 20–7. **Drive: 3 plays, 77 yards, 1:07.**
- MIA – Mike Gesicki 6-yard pass from Tua Tagovailoa (Jason Sanders kick), 5:15. Falcons 20–14. **Drive: 9 plays, 58 yards, 3:48.**

**Fourth quarter**

- ATL – Cordarrelle Patterson 3-yard run (Younghoe Koo kick), 12:51. Falcons 27–14. **Drive: 3 plays, 14 yards, 1:06.**
- MIA – Myles Gaskin 7-yard pass from Tua Tagovailoa (Jason Sanders kick), 8:29. Falcons 27–21. **Drive: 9 plays, 90 yards, 4:22.**
- MIA – Mack Hollins 4-yard pass from Tua Tagovailoa (Jason Sanders kick), 2:27. Dolphins 28–27. **Drive: 9 plays, 40 yards, 3:27.**
- ATL – Younghoe Koo 36-yard field goal, 0:00. Falcons 30–28. **Drive: 9 plays, 57 yards, 2:27.**

**Top passers**

- ATL – Matt Ryan – 25/40, 336 yards, 2 TD, INT
- MIA – Tua Tagovailoa – 32/40, 291 yards, 4 TD, 2 INT

**Top rushers**

- ATL – Cordarrelle Patterson – 14 rushes, 60 yards, TD
- MIA – Myles Gaskin – 15 rushes, 67 yards

**Top receivers**

- ATL – Kyle Pitts – 7 receptions, 163 yards
- MIA – Mike Gesicki – 7 receptions, 85 yards, TD

==== Week 8: vs. Carolina Panthers ====
Week 8: Carolina Panthers at Atlanta Falcons – Game summary

Quarter	1	2	3	4	Total
**Panthers**	3	6	3	7	**19**
Falcons	3	7	0	3	**13**

at Mercedes-Benz Stadium, Atlanta, Georgia

- Date: October 31
- Game time: 1:00 p.m. EDT
- Game weather: Cloudy, 58 °F (14 °C) (retractable roof open)
- Game attendance: 68,583
- Referee: Brad Allen
- TV announcers (Fox): Kevin Kugler, Mark Sanchez and Laura Okmin
- Recap, Game Book

Game information

**First quarter**

- ATL – Younghoe Koo 46-yard field goal, 13:30. Falcons 3–0. **Drive: 4 plays, 2 yards, 1:26.**
- CAR – Zane Gonzalez 29-yard field goal, 6:13. Tied 3–3. **Drive: 15 plays, 64 yards, 7:17.**

**Second quarter**

- ATL – Cordarrelle Patterson 15-yard pass from Matt Ryan (Younghoe Koo kick), 13:58. Falcons 10–3. **Drive: 8 plays, 61 yards, 4:23.**
- CAR – Zane Gonzalez 51-yard field goal, 9:13. Falcons 10–6. **Drive: 8 plays, 42 yards, 4:45.**
- CAR – Zane Gonzalez 57-yard field goal, 0:00. Falcons 10–9. **Drive: 5 plays, 34 yards, 0:24.**

**Third quarter**

- CAR – Zane Gonzalez 23-yard field goal, 3:33. Panthers 12–10. **Drive: 16 plays, 78 yards, 8:42.**

**Fourth quarter**

- CAR – Chuba Hubbard 6-yard run (Zane Gonzalez kick), 6:30. Panthers 19–10. **Drive: 15 plays, 65 yards, 7:40.**
- ATL – Younghoe Koo 53-yard field goal, 0:16. Panthers 19–13. **Drive: 2 plays, 25 yards, 0:34.**

**Top passers**

- CAR – Sam Darnold – 13/24, 129 yards
- ATL – Matt Ryan – 20/27, 146 yards, TD, 2 INT

**Top rushers**

- CAR – Chuba Hubbard – 24 rushes, 82 yards, TD
- ATL – Mike Davis – 9 rushes, 44 yards

**Top receivers**

- CAR – D. J. Moore – 4 receptions, 59 yards
- ATL – Tajae Sharpe – 5 receptions, 58 yards

==== Week 9: at New Orleans Saints ====
Week 9: Atlanta Falcons at New Orleans Saints – Game summary

Quarter	1	2	3	4	Total
**Falcons**	3	7	7	10	**27**
Saints	0	0	3	22	**25**

at Caesars Superdome, New Orleans, Louisiana

- Date: November 7
- Game time: 1:00 p.m. EST/12:00 p.m. CST
- Game weather: None (indoor stadium)
- Game attendance: 69,170
- Referee: Alex Kemp
- TV announcers (Fox): Kenny Albert, Jonathan Vilma and Sara Walsh
- Recap, Game Book

Game information

**First quarter**

- ATL – Younghoe Koo 32-yard field goal, 4:26. Falcons 3–0. **Drive: 8 plays, 64 yards, 3:45.**

**Second quarter**

- ATL – Olamide Zaccheaus 3-yard pass from Matt Ryan (Younghoe Koo kick), 0:06. Falcons 10–0. **Drive: 15 plays, 92 yards, 5:30.**

**Third quarter**

- NO – Brian Johnson 35-yard field goal, 9:36. Falcons 10–3. **Drive: 12 plays, 60 yards, 5:24.**
- ATL – Matt Ryan 1-yard run (Younghoe Koo kick), 5:13. Falcons 17–3. **Drive: 7 plays, 81 yards, 4:23.**

**Fourth quarter**

- NO – Brian Johnson 52-yard field goal, 14:49. Falcons 17–6. **Drive: 11 plays, 45 yards, 5:24.**
- ATL – Olamide Zaccheaus 6-yard pass from Matt Ryan (Younghoe Koo kick), 10:39. Falcons 24–6. **Drive: 1 play, 6 yards, 0:07.**
- NO – Marquez Callaway 5-yard pass from Trevor Siemian (Brian Johnson kick), 7:57. Falcons 24–13. **Drive: 8 plays, 66 yards, 2:42.**
- NO – Alvin Kamara 2-yard run (pass failed), 4:35. Falcons 24–19. **Drive: 6 plays, 54 yards, 0:51.**
- NO – Kenny Stills 8-yard pass from Trevor Siemian (run failed), 1:01. Saints 25–24. **Drive: 5 plays, 43 yards, 1:45.**
- ATL – Younghoe Koo 29-yard field goal, 0:00. Falcons 27–25. **Drive: 5 plays, 64 yards, 1:01.**

**Top passers**

- ATL – Matt Ryan – 23/30, 343 yards, 2 TD
- NO – Trevor Siemian – 25/41, 249 yards, 2 TD

**Top rushers**

- ATL – Mike Davis – 9 rushes, 13 yards
- NO – Alvin Kamara – 13 rushes, 50 yards, TD

**Top receivers**

- ATL – Cordarrelle Patterson – 6 receptions, 126 yards
- NO – Alvin Kamara – 4 receptions, 54 yards

Younghoe Koo kicked a game-winning field goal as time ran out, improving Atlanta to 4–4.

==== Week 10: at Dallas Cowboys ====
Week 10: Atlanta Falcons at Dallas Cowboys – Game summary

Quarter	1	2	3	4	Total
Falcons	3	0	0	0	**3**
**Cowboys**	7	29	7	0	**43**

at AT&T Stadium, Arlington, Texas

- Date: November 14
- Game time: 1:00 p.m. EST/12:00 p.m. CST
- Game weather: 66 °F (19 °C) (retractable roof open)
- Game attendance: 93,436
- Referee: Craig Wrolstad
- TV announcers (Fox): Kevin Burkhardt, Greg Olsen and Pam Oliver
- Recap, Game Book

Game information

**First quarter**

- DAL – CeeDee Lamb 13-yard pass from Dak Prescott (Lirim Hajrullahu kick), 11:42. Cowboys 7–0. **Drive: 8 plays, 73 yards, 3:18.**
- ATL – Younghoe Koo 35–yard field goal, 8:24. Cowboys 7–3. **Drive: 8 plays, 58 yards, 3:18.**

**Second quarter**

- DAL – Ezekiel Elliott 1-yard run (Lirim Hajrullahu kick), 13:24. Cowboys 14–3. **Drive: 12 plays, 68 yards, 5:41.**
- DAL – Ezekiel Elliott 2-yard run (Lirim Hajrullahu kick), 8:07. Cowboys 21–3. **Drive: 8 plays, 68 yards, 3:49.**
- DAL – CeeDee Lamb 9-yard pass from Dak Prescott (Lirim Hajrullahu kick), 1:10. Cowboys 28–3. **Drive: 10 plays, 59 yards, 4:38.**
- DAL – Nahshon Wright 8-yard return of blocked punt (Ezekiel Elliott run), 0:37. Cowboys 36–3.

**Third quarter**

- DAL – Dak Prescott 4-yard run (Lirim Hajrullahu kick), 0:31. Cowboys 43–3. **Drive: 9 plays, 47 yards, 0:31.**

**Fourth quarter**

- No scoring plays.

**Top passers**

- ATL – Matt Ryan – 9/21, 117 yards, 2 INT
- DAL – Dak Prescott – 24/31, 296 yards, 2 TD

**Top rushers**

- ATL – Wayne Gallman Jr. – 15 rushes, 55 yards
- DAL – Tony Pollard – 11 rushes, 42 yards

**Top receivers**

- ATL – Kyle Pitts – 4 receptions, 60 yards
- DAL – CeeDee Lamb – 6 receptions, 94 yards

==== Week 11: vs. New England Patriots ====
Week 11: New England Patriots at Atlanta Falcons – Game summary

Quarter	1	2	3	4	Total
**Patriots**	3	10	0	12	**25**
Falcons	0	0	0	0	**0**

at Mercedes-Benz Stadium, Atlanta, Georgia

- Date: November 18
- Game time: 8:20 p.m. EST
- Game weather: None (retractable roof closed)
- Game attendance: 68,286
- Referee: Land Clark
- TV announcers (Fox/NFLN/Prime Video): Joe Buck, Troy Aikman, Erin Andrews and Kristina Pink
- Recap, Game Book

Game information

**First quarter**

- NE – Nick Folk 32-yard field goal, 5:14. Patriots 3–0. **Drive: 9 plays, 52 yards, 4:38**

**Second quarter**

- NE – Nelson Agholor 19-yard pass from Mac Jones (Nick Folk kick), 13:44. Patriots 10–0. **Drive: 7 plays, 76 yards, 3:29.**
- NE – Nick Folk 44-yard field goal, 0:00. Patriots 13–0. **Drive: 7 plays, 41 yards, 1:48.**

**Third quarter**

- No scoring plays

**Fourth quarter**

- NE – Nick Folk 53-yard field goal, 6:39. Patriots 16–0. **Drive: 8 plays, 43 yards, 5:21.**
- NE – Nick Folk 33-yard field goal, 1:55. Patriots 19–0. **Drive: 8 plays, 35 yards, 3:14.**
- NE – Kyle Van Noy 35-yard interception return (kick failed, wide left), 1:22. Patriots 25–0.

**Top passers**

- NE – Mac Jones – 22/26, 207 yards, TD, INT
- ATL – Matt Ryan – 19/28, 153 yards, 2 INT

**Top rushers**

- NE – Rhamondre Stevenson – 12 rushes, 69 yards
- ATL – Qadree Ollison – 9 rushes, 34 yards

**Top receivers**

- NE – Kendrick Bourne – 4 receptions, 42 yards
- ATL – Russell Gage – 5 receptions, 49 yards

With the disastrous loss to New England, which was the 8th time the Falcons failed to beat the Patriots since 1998, the Falcons fell to 4-6 on the year.

==== Week 12: at Jacksonville Jaguars ====
Week 12: Atlanta Falcons at Jacksonville Jaguars – Game summary

Quarter	1	2	3	4	Total
**Falcons**	7	7	7	0	**21**
Jaguars	0	3	8	3	**14**

at TIAA Bank Field, Jacksonville, Florida

- Date: November 28
- Game time: 1:00 p.m. EST
- Game weather: Partly cloudy, 62 °F (17 °C)
- Game attendance: 60,031
- Referee: Carl Cheffers
- TV announcers (Fox): Kevin Kugler, Mark Sanchez and Laura Okmin
- Recap, Game Book

Game information

**First quarter**

- ATL – Cordarrelle Patterson 7-yard run (Younghoe Koo kick), 0:38. Falcons 7–0. **Drive: 9 plays, 81 yards, 5:17.**

**Second quarter**

- ATL – Cordarrelle Patterson 12-yard run (Younghoe Koo kick), 6:40. Falcons 14–0. **Drive: 4 plays, 29 yards, 1:04.**
- JAX – Matthew Wright 22-yard field goal, 0:46. Falcons 14–3. **Drive: 14 plays, 70 yards, 5:55.**

**Third quarter**

- ATL – Russell Gage 12-yard pass from Matt Ryan (Younghoe Koo kick), 7:47. Falcons 21–3. **Drive: 9 plays, 88 yards, 5:01.**
- JAX – Tavon Austin 7-yard pass from Trevor Lawrence (Trevor Lawrence-James O'Shaughnessy pass), 0:22. Falcons 21–11. **Drive: 9 plays, 72 yards, 3:44.**

**Fourth quarter**

- JAX – Matthew Wright 34-yard field goal, 6:28. Falcons 21–14. **Drive: 14 plays, 74 yards, 6:29.**

**Top passers**

- ATL – Matt Ryan – 19/29, 190 yards, TD, INT
- JAX – Trevor Lawrence – 23/42, 228 yards, TD, INT

**Top rushers**

- ATL – Cordarrelle Patterson – 16 rushes, 108 yards, 2 TD
- JAX – James Robinson – 17 rushes, 86 yards

**Top receivers**

- ATL – Russell Gage – 6 receptions, 62 yards, TD
- JAX – Laquon Treadwell – 4 receptions, 53 yards

==== Week 13: vs. Tampa Bay Buccaneers ====
Week 13: Tampa Bay Buccaneers at Atlanta Falcons – Game summary

Quarter	1	2	3	4	Total
**Buccaneers**	13	7	7	3	**30**
Falcons	7	10	0	0	**17**

at Mercedes-Benz Stadium, Atlanta, Georgia

- Date: December 5
- Game time: 1:00 p.m. EST
- Game weather: None (retractable roof closed)
- Game attendance: 69,366
- Referee: Tony Corrente
- TV announcers (Fox): Kenny Albert, Jonathan Vilma and Sara Walsh
- Recap, Game Book

Game information

**First quarter**

- TB – Leonard Fournette 3-yard pass from Tom Brady (Ryan Succop kick), 9:53. Buccaneers 7–0. **Drive: 13 plays, 75 yards, 5:07.**
- ATL – Mike Davis 17-yard run (Younghoe Koo kick), 6:40. Tied 7–7. **Drive: 6 plays, 75 yards, 3:13.**
- TB – Cameron Brate 7-yard pass from Tom Brady (kick failed), 4:23. Buccaneers 13–7. **Drive: 6 plays, 75 yards, 2:17.**

**Second quarter**

- ATL – Younghoe Koo 21-yard field goal, 8:39. Buccaneers 14–10. **Drive: 15 plays, 72 yards, 7:00.**
- TB – Rob Gronkowski 27-yard pass from Tom Brady (Ryan Succop kick), 4:54. Buccaneers 20–10. **Drive: 9 plays, 75 yards, 3:45.**
- ATL – Marlon Davidson 3-yard interception return (Younghoe Koo kick), 0:22. Buccaneers 20–17.

**Third quarter**

- TB – Rob Gronkowski 11-yard pass from Tom Brady (Ryan Succop kick), 0:29. Buccaneers 27–17. **Drive: 14 plays, 87 yards, 5:43.**

**Fourth quarter**

- TB – Ryan Succop 31-yard field goal, 1:49. Buccaneers 30–17. **Drive: 13 plays, 78 yards, 5:36.**

**Top passers**

- TB – Tom Brady – 38/51, 368 yards, 4 TD, INT
- ATL – Matt Ryan – 30/41, 297 yards

**Top rushers**

- TB – Leonard Fournette – 13 rushes, 44 yards
- ATL – Cordarrelle Patterson – 13 rushes, 78 yards

**Top receivers**

- TB – Chris Godwin – 15 receptions, 143 yards
- ATL – Russell Gage – 11 receptions, 130 yards

==== Week 14: at Carolina Panthers ====
Week 14: Atlanta Falcons at Carolina Panthers – Game summary

Quarter	1	2	3	4	Total
**Falcons**	7	10	3	9	**29**
Panthers	7	0	7	7	**21**

at Bank of America Stadium, Charlotte, North Carolina

- Date: December 12
- Game time: 1:00 p.m. EST
- Game weather: Sunny, 51 °F (11 °C)
- Game attendance: 72,243
- Referee: Shawn Smith
- TV announcers (Fox): Kenny Albert, Jonathan Vilma and Lindsay Czarniak
- Recap, Game Book

Game information

**First quarter**

- CAR – Cam Newton 12-yard run (Zane Gonzalez kick), 8:19. Panthers 7–0. **Drive: 9 plays, 65 yards, 4:19.**
- ATL – Cordarrelle Patterson 5-yard run (Younghoe Koo kick), 3:03. Tied 7–7. **Drive: 11 plays, 75 yards, 5:16.**

**Second quarter**

- ATL – Mykal Walker 66-yard interception run (Younghoe Koo kick), 8:35. Falcons 14–7.
- ATL – Younghoe Koo 32-yard field goal, 3:12. Falcons 17–7. **Drive: 9 plays, 38 yards, 3:52.**

**Third quarter**

- CAR – Chuba Hubbard 17-yard run (Zane Gonzalez kick), 11:21. Falcons 17–14. **Drive: 8 plays, 60 yards, 3:39.**
- ATL – Younghoe Koo 38-yard field goal, 6:28. Falcons 20–14. **Drive: 9 plays, 55 yards, 4:53.**

**Fourth quarter**

- ATL – Hayden Hurst 3-yard pass from Matt Ryan (pass failed), 14:17. Falcons 26–14. **Drive: 10 plays, 49 yards, 5:23.**
- ATL – Younghoe Koo 48-yard field goal, 6:10. Falcons 29–14. **Drive: 6 plays, 18 yards, 3:45.**
- CAR – Robby Anderson 5-yard pass from P. J. Walker (Zane Gonzalez kick), 3:11. Falcons 29–21. **Drive: 6 plays, 51 yards, 1:38.**

**Top passers**

- ATL – Matt Ryan – 19/28, 190, TD
- CAR – Cam Newton – 15/23, 178 yards, INT

**Top rushers**

- ATL – Cordarrelle Patterson – 16 rushes, 58 yards, TD
- CAR – Cam Newton – 10 rushes, 47 yards, TD

**Top receivers**

- ATL – Russell Gage – 4 receptions, 64 yards
- CAR – Robby Anderson – 8 receptions, 84 yards, TD

==== Week 15: at San Francisco 49ers ====
Week 15: Atlanta Falcons at San Francisco 49ers – Game summary

Quarter	1	2	3	4	Total
Falcons	3	7	3	0	**13**
**49ers**	3	14	14	0	**31**

at Levi's Stadium, Santa Clara, California

- Date: December 19
- Game time: 4:05 p.m. EST/1:05 p.m. PST
- Game weather: Clear, 52 °F (11 °C)
- Game attendance: 71,650
- Referee: Clay Martin
- TV announcers (CBS): Kevin Harlan, Trent Green and Melanie Collins
- Recap, Game Book

Game information

**First quarter**

- ATL – Younghoe Koo 48-yard field goal, 7:12. Falcons 3–0. **Drive: 7 plays, 19 yards, 3:49.**
- SF – Robbie Gould 30-yard field goal, 1:21. Tied 3–3. **Drive: 11 plays, 79 yards, 5:51.**

**Second quarter**

- SF – Kyle Juszczyk 6-yard run (Robbie Gould kick), 9:14. 49ers 10–3. **Drive: 8 plays, 77 yards, 4:16.**
- ATL – Russell Gage 20-yard pass from Matt Ryan (Younghoe Koo kick), 4:00. Tied 10–10. **Drive: 8 plays, 65 yards, 5:14.**
- SF – Deebo Samuel 10-yard run (Robbie Gould kick), 0:33. 49ers 17–10. **Drive: 6 plays, 75 yards, 3:27.**

**Third quarter**

- SF – Jeff Wilson Jr. 5-yard run (Robbie Gould kick), 11:11. 49ers 24–10. **Drive: 4 plays, 38 yards, 2:10.**
- ATL – Younghoe Koo 22-yard field goal, 6:28. 49ers 24–13. **Drive: 9 plays, 71 yards, 4:43.**
- SF – Jauan Jennings 4-yard pass from Jimmy Garoppolo (Robbie Gould kick), 1:17. 49ers 31–13. **Drive: 10 plays, 75 yards, 5:11.**

**Fourth quarter**

- No scoring plays.

**Top passers**

- ATL – Matt Ryan – 19/32, 236 yards, TD
- SF – Jimmy Garoppolo – 18/23, 235 yards, TD

**Top rushers**

- ATL – Mike Davis – 6 rushes, 21 yards
- SF – Jeff Wilson Jr. – 21 rushes, 110 yards, TD

**Top receivers**

- ATL – Russell Gage – 8 receptions, 91 yards, TD
- SF – George Kittle – 6 receptions, 93 yards

==== Week 16: vs. Detroit Lions ====
Week 16: Detroit Lions at Atlanta Falcons – Game summary

Quarter	1	2	3	4	Total
Lions	3	7	3	3	**16**
**Falcons**	0	10	3	7	**20**

at Mercedes-Benz Stadium, Atlanta, Georgia

- Date: December 26
- Game time: 1:00 p.m. EST
- Game weather: Partly cloudy, 70 °F (21 °C) (retractable roof open)
- Game attendance: 68,638
- Referee: Ronald Torbert
- TV announcers (Fox): Chris Myers, Robert Smith and Jen Hale
- Recap, Game Book

Game information

**First quarter**

- DET – Riley Patterson 26-yard field goal, 3:25. Lions 3–0. **Drive: 13 plays, 54 yards, 7:34.**

**Second quarter**

- ATL – Cordarrelle Patterson 6-yard run (Younghoe Koo kick), 10:53. Falcons 7–3. **Drive: 9 plays, 54 yards, 4:24.**
- DET – Amon-Ra St. Brown 20-yard pass from Tim Boyle (Riley Patterson kick), 3:44. Lions 10–7. **Drive: 11 plays, 75 yards, 7:09.**
- ATL – Younghoe Koo 53-yard field goal, 1:04. Tied 10–10. **Drive: 7 plays, 43 yards, 2:40.**

**Third quarter**

- ATL – Younghoe Koo 48-yard field goal, 10:11. Falcons 13–10. **Drive: 8 plays, 59 yards, 3:19.**
- DET – Riley Patterson 37-yard field goal, 3:06. Tied 13–13. **Drive: 12 plays, 56 yards, 7:05.**

**Fourth quarter**

- ATL – Hayden Hurst 12-yard pass from Matt Ryan (Younghoe Koo kick), 13:04. Falcons 20–13. **Drive: 10 plays, 71 yards, 5:02.**
- DET – Riley Patterson 26-yard field goal, 2:38. Falcons 20–16. **Drive: 17 plays, 66 yards, 10:26.**

**Top passers**

- DET – Tim Boyle – 24/34, 187 yards, TD, INT
- ATL – Matt Ryan – 18/24, 215 yards, TD

**Top rushers**

- DET – Jamaal Williams – 19 rushes, 77 yards
- ATL – Mike Davis – 7 rushes, 28 yards

**Top receivers**

- DET – Amon-Ra St. Brown – 9 receptions, 91 yards, TD
- ATL – Kyle Pitts – 6 receptions, 102 yards

==== Week 17: at Buffalo Bills ====
Week 17: Atlanta Falcons at Buffalo Bills – Game summary

Quarter	1	2	3	4	Total
Falcons	2	13	0	0	**15**
**Bills**	14	0	8	7	**29**

at Highmark Stadium, Orchard Park, New York

- Date: January 2
- Game time: 1:00 p.m. EST
- Game weather: Snow showers, 25 °F (−4 °C)
- Game attendance: 64,948
- Referee: Land Clark
- TV announcers (Fox): Kevin Kugler, Mark Sanchez and Laura Okmin
- Recap, Game Book

Game information

**First quarter**

- ATL – Jake Kumerow tackled in end zone for a safety, 11:04. Falcons 2–0.
- BUF – Josh Allen 1-yard run (Tyler Bass kick), 3:15. Bills 7–2. **Drive: 15 plays, 69 yards, 6:10.**
- BUF – Josh Allen 4-yard run (Tyler Bass kick), 0:35. Bills 14–2. **Drive: 6 plays, 18 yards, 1:52.**

**Second quarter**

- ATL – Younghoe Koo 28-yard field goal, 10:08. Bills 14–5. **Drive: 10 plays, 65 yards, 5:27.**
- ATL – Mike Davis 1-yard run (Younghoe Koo kick), 1:48. Bills 14–12. **Drive: 5 plays, 80 yards, 1:32.**
- ATL – Younghoe Koo 24-yard field goal, 0:00. Falcons 15–14. **Drive: 7 plays, 50 yards, 1:06.**

**Third quarter**

- BUF – Devin Singletary 6-yard run (Josh Allen–Cole Beasley pass), 5:56. Bills 22–15. **Drive: 11 plays, 80 yards, 6:36.**

**Fourth quarter**

- BUF – Devin Singletary 4-yard run (Tyler Bass kick), 10:46. Bills 29–15. **Drive: 12 plays, 65 yards, 7:18.**

**Top passers**

- ATL – Matt Ryan – 13/23, 197 yards
- BUF – Josh Allen – 11/26, 120 yards, 3 INT

**Top rushers**

- ATL – Mike Davis – 8 rushes, 42 yards, TD
- BUF – Devin Singletary – 23 rushes, 110 yards, 2 TD

**Top receivers**

- ATL – Kyle Pitts – 2 receptions, 69 yards
- BUF – Stefon Diggs – 5 receptions, 52 yards

With the loss, Atlanta fell to 7-9, finishing 2-3 against the AFC, and they were eliminated from playoff contention for the 4th straight year.

==== Week 18: vs. New Orleans Saints ====
Week 18: New Orleans Saints at Atlanta Falcons – Game summary

Quarter	1	2	3	4	Total
**Saints**	7	17	0	6	**30**
Falcons	3	3	7	7	**20**

at Mercedes-Benz Stadium, Atlanta, Georgia

- Date: January 9
- Game time: 4:25 p.m. EST
- Game weather: None (retractable roof closed)
- Game attendance: 68,336
- Referee: Craig Wrolstad
- TV announcers (Fox): Kevin Kugler, Mark Sanchez and Laura Okmin
- Recap, Game Book

Game information

**First quarter**

- NO – Adam Trautman 18-yard pass from Taysom Hill (Brett Maher kick), 8:29. Saints 7–0. **Drive: 10 plays, 84 yards, 6:31.**
- ATL – Younghoe Koo 48-yard field goal, 3:15. Saints 7–3. **Drive: 10 plays, 45 yards, 5:14.**

**Second quarter**

- ATL – Younghoe Koo 54-yard field goal, 10:31. Saints 7–6. **Drive: 7 plays, 40 yards, 2:58.**
- NO – Tre'Quan Smith 13-yard pass from Trevor Siemian (Brett Maher kick), 5:47. Saints 14–6. **Drive: 9 plays, 73 yards, 4:44.**
- NO – Brett Maher 37-yard field goal, 1:03. Saints 17–6. **Drive: 9 plays, 36 yards, 4:26.**
- NO – Juwan Johnson 5-yard pass from Trevor Siemian (Brett Maher kick), 0:02. Saints 24–6. **Drive: 3 plays, 11 yards, 0:50.**

**Third quarter**

- ATL – Qadree Ollison 19-yard run (Younghoe Koo kick), 2:49. Saints 24–13. **Drive: 4 plays, 56 yards, 1:09.**

**Fourth quarter**

- NO – Brett Maher 27-yard field goal, 10:55. Saints 27–13. **Drive: 13 plays, 66 yards, 6:54.**
- NO – Brett Maher 33-yard field goal, 7:36. Saints 30–13. **Drive: 7 plays, 14 yards, 3:06.**
- ATL – Russell Gage 1-yard pass from Matt Ryan (Younghoe Koo kick), 0:21. Saints 30–20. **Drive: 13 plays, 85 yards, 3:56.**

**Top passers**

- NO – Taysom Hill – 7/9, 107 yards, TD
- ATL – Matt Ryan – 20/33, 216 yards, TD, INT

**Top rushers**

- NO – Alvin Kamara – 30 rushes, 146 yards
- ATL – Mike Davis – 6 rushes, 30 yards

**Top receivers**

- NO – Tre'Quan Smith – 5 receptions, 76 yards, TD
- ATL – Russell Gage – 9 receptions, 126 yards, TD

Coming off with a 2-point win in Week 9, they host the Saints. They were defeated by 10 points and finish their season with a 7-10 record.

=== Standings ===
==== Division ====
NFC South
	W	L	T	PCT	DIV	CONF	PF	PA	STK
^{(2)} Tampa Bay Buccaneers	13	4	0	.765	4–2	8–4	511	353	W3
New Orleans Saints	9	8	0	.529	4–2	7–5	364	335	W2
Atlanta Falcons	7	10	0	.412	2–4	4–8	313	459	L2
Carolina Panthers	5	12	0	.294	2–4	3–9	304	404	L7

==== Conference ====
NFC
#	Team	Division	W	L	T	PCT	DIV	CONF	SOS	SOV	STK
**Division winners**
1 (Note: Green Bay finished ahead of Tampa Bay based on conference record (9–3 vs. 8–4), claiming the No. 1 seed.)	Green Bay Packers	North	13	4	0	.765	4–2	9–3	.479	.480	L1
2	Tampa Bay Buccaneers	South	13	4	0	.765	4–2	8–4	.467	.443	W3
3 (Note: Dallas claimed the No. 3 seed over LA Rams based on conference record (10–2 vs. 8–4).)	Dallas Cowboys	East	12	5	0	.706	6–0	10–2	.488	.431	W1
4	Los Angeles Rams	West	12	5	0	.706	3–3	8–4	.483	.409	L1
**Wild cards**
5	Arizona Cardinals	West	11	6	0	.647	4–2	7–5	.490	.492	L1
6	San Francisco 49ers	West	10	7	0	.588	2–4	7–5	.500	.438	W2
7 (Note: Philadelphia finished ahead of New Orleans based on head-to-head victory, claiming the 7th and final playoff spot.)	Philadelphia Eagles	East	9	8	0	.529	3–3	7–5	.469	.350	L1
**Did not qualify for the postseason**
8	New Orleans Saints	South	9	8	0	.529	4–2	7–5	.512	.516	W2
9	Minnesota Vikings	North	8	9	0	.471	4–2	6–6	.507	.434	W1
10 (Note: Washington finished ahead of Atlanta and Seattle based on head-to-head victories.)	Washington Football Team	East	7	10	0	.412	2–4	6–6	.529	.420	W1
11 (Note: Seattle finished ahead of Atlanta based on win percentage in common games (4–2 vs. 3–3 against: San Francisco, New Orleans, Jacksonville, Washington, and Detroit).)	Seattle Seahawks	West	7	10	0	.412	3–3	4–8	.519	.424	W2
12	Atlanta Falcons	South	7	10	0	.412	2–4	4–8	.472	.315	L2
13	Chicago Bears	North	6	11	0	.353	2–4	4–8	.524	.373	L1
14	Carolina Panthers	South	5	12	0	.294	2–4	3–9	.509	.412	L7
15	New York Giants	East	4	13	0	.235	1–5	3–9	.536	.485	L6
16	Detroit Lions	North	3	13	1	.206	2–4	3–9	.528	.627	W1
**Tiebreakers** (Note: When breaking ties for three or more teams under the NFL's rules, they are first broken within divisions, then comparing only the highest-ranked remaining team from each division.)
