= Russell Gage =

American football player (born 1996)

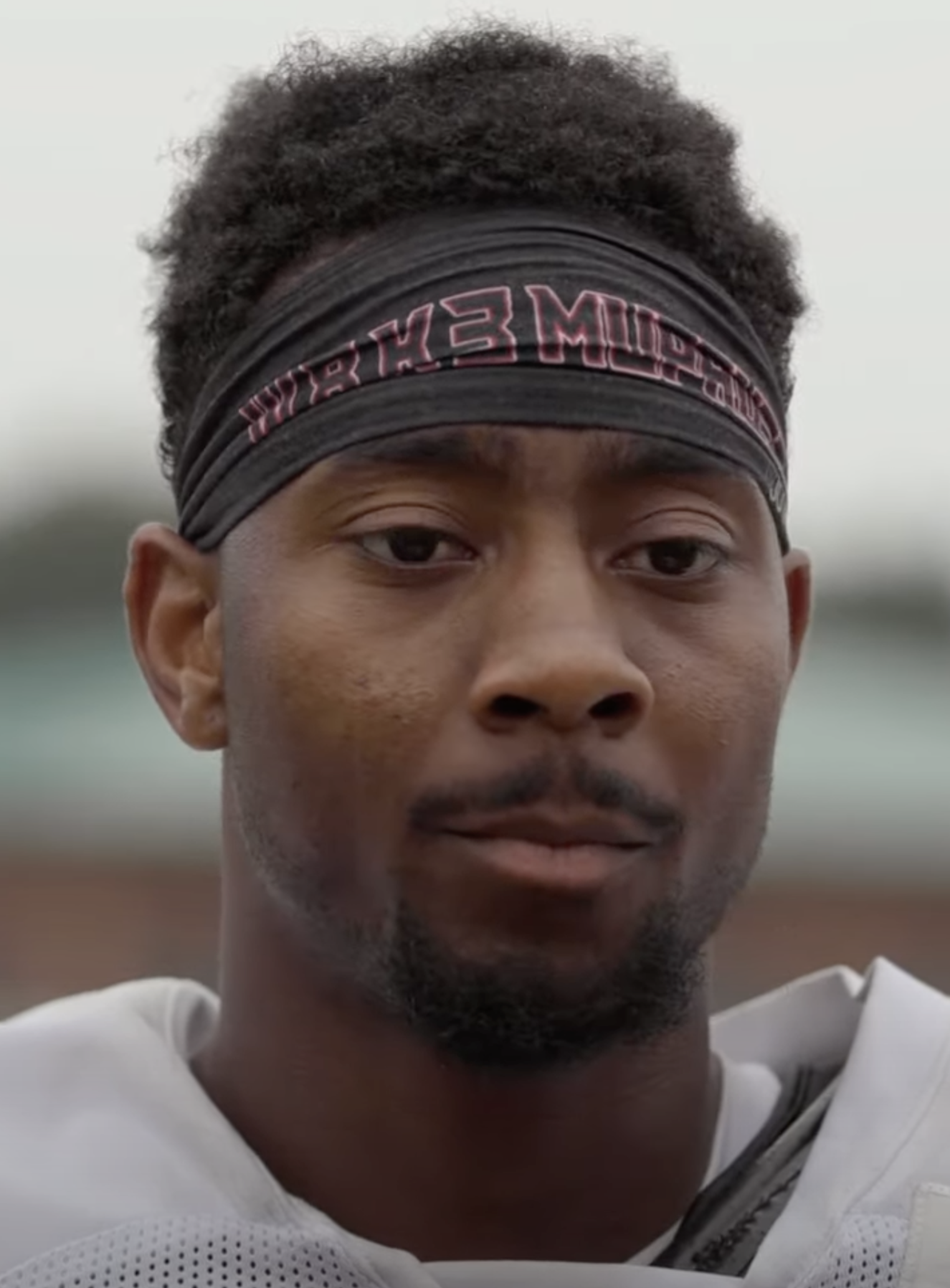
- Gage with the Atlanta Falcons in 2021

Profile
- Position: Wide receiver

Personal information
- Born: January 22, 1996 (age 30); Baton Rouge, Louisiana, U.S.
- Listed height: 6 ft 0 in (1.83 m)
- Listed weight: 184 lb (83 kg)

Career information
- High school: Redemptorist (Baton Rouge)
- College: LSU (2014–2017)
- NFL draft: 2018: 6th round, 194th overall pick

Career history
- Atlanta Falcons (2018–2021); Tampa Bay Buccaneers (2022–2023); Baltimore Ravens (2024)*; San Francisco 49ers (2024–2025)
- * Offseason or practice squad member only

Career NFL statistics as of 2025
- Receptions: 244
- Receiving yards: 2,491
- Receiving touchdowns: 14
- Stats at Pro Football Reference

Russell Gage Jr. (born January 22, 1996) is an American professional football wide receiver. He played college football for the LSU Tigers, and was selected by the Atlanta Falcons in the sixth round of the 2018 NFL draft. He also played for the Tampa Bay Buccaneers.

== Early life ==
Gage attended and played high school football at Redemptorist High School.

== College career ==
Gage attended and played college football at LSU from 2014 to 2017. He played defensive back for his first two seasons, but was brought onto the offense in Week 7 of his junior year for a key victory over #22 Texas A&M, where he led the run-heavy Tigers with five catches for 62 yards and a touchdown, his only receptions of the season. He was used as both a running back and receiver in his senior year, generating four touchdowns on just 49 touches. He also recorded 11 tackles as a special teams gunner.

=== College statistics ===
Season	Team	Conf	Class	GP	Receiving				Rushing			
Season	Team	Conf	Class	GP	Rec	Yds	Avg	TD	Att	Yds	Avg	TD
2014	LSU	SEC	FR	1	0	0	0.0	0	0	0	0.0	0
2015	LSU	SEC	SO	0	0	0	0.0	0	0	0	0.0	0
2016	LSU	SEC	JR	7	5	62	12.4	1	0	0	0.0	0
2017	LSU	SEC	SR	13	21	285	13.6	3	28	232	8.3	1
Career				21	26	347	13.3	4	28	232	8.3	1

== Professional career ==
Pre-draft measurables
Height	Weight	Arm length	Hand span	40-yard dash	10-yard split	20-yard split	20-yard shuttle	Three-cone drill	Vertical jump	Broad jump	Bench press
6 ft 0 in (1.83 m)	186 lb (84 kg)	33 in (0.84 m)	9 1/8 in (0.23 m)	4.50 s	1.54 s	2.54 s	4.25 s	7.03 s	39.0 in (0.99 m)	10 ft 2 in (3.10 m)	15 reps
All values from Pro Day

=== Atlanta Falcons ===
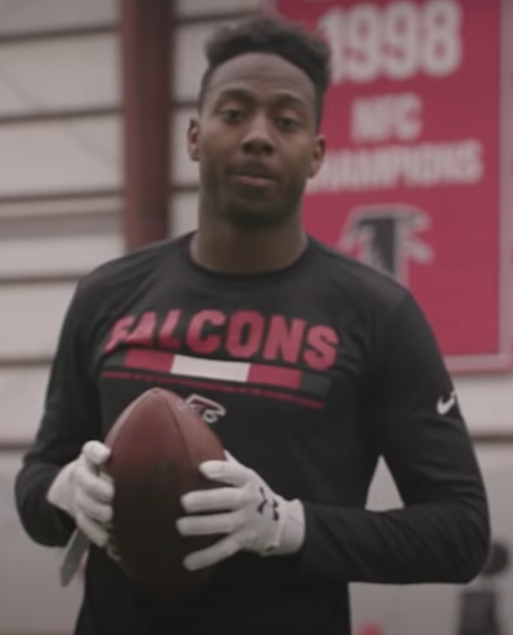
Gage with the Falcons in 2018

With modest college stats, Gage was not invited to the combine of any of the major award games, but attracted attention after an exceptional Pro Day and strong endorsement of his work ethic by coaches. Gage was drafted by the Atlanta Falcons in the sixth round with the 194th overall pick in the 2018 NFL draft, four rounds behind fellow LSU wide receiver D. J. Chark. In Week 6, against the Tampa Bay Buccaneers, Gage recorded his first professional reception, which went for six yards. As a rookie, he totaled six receptions for 63 yards in 15 games on a team with deep talent at receiver.

In Week 13 of the 2019 season, Gage recorded his first professional receiving touchdown against the New Orleans Saints. Overall, Gage finished the 2019 season with 49 receptions for 446 receiving yards (fourth on the team behind Calvin Ridley, and pro-bowl-bound Julio Jones and Austin Hooper) and one receiving touchdown.

With Jones injured for seven games and the departure of Hooper, in 2020 Gage became the second leading receiver for the 4–12 Falcons. Gage's breakthrough game came in the home opener of September 13, a loss to the Seattle Seahawks where he had 114 receiving yards on nine receptions. In the following week's game against the Dallas Cowboys, Gage caught six passes for 46 yards and another touchdown during the 40–39 loss. In Week 14, against the Los Angeles Chargers, he threw a 39-yard touchdown reception to Calvin Ridley in the 20–17 loss. Gage finished the 2020 season with 72 receptions for 786 receiving yards and four receiving touchdowns.

The 2021 season was highlighted by 11 receptions for 130 yards in a 30–17 loss to the Buccaneers in Week 13, and catching 9 of 13 targets for 126 yards and a touchdown in a Week 18 loss to the Saints. The touchdown was both Gage's and quarterback Matt Ryan's last touchdowns as Atlanta Falcons. Gage missed two games due to injuries, but still was the Falcons' second leading receiver, behind rookie pro-bowler Kyle Pitts. Gage finished the 2021 season with 66 receptions for 770 receiving yards and seven receiving touchdowns in 14 games.

=== Tampa Bay Buccaneers ===
On March 18, 2022, Gage signed a three-year, $30 million contract with the Buccaneers. Gage spent five weeks on injured reserve. He had a career-best 12 receptions (for 87 yards and a touchdown) in a Week 3 loss to the Green Bay Packers. He had his first career multi-touchdown game in a Week 14 loss to the Cincinnati Bengals. Gage finished the 2022 season with 51 receptions for 426 receiving yards and five receiving touchdowns in 13 games.

On January 16, 2023, Gage suffered a neck injury during a Wild Card Round playoff game against the Cowboys and was carted off the field. It was confirmed after the game by Todd Bowles that Gage had suffered a concussion from the contact and was being evaluated in a local hospital. The following morning, it was confirmed by the team that Gage "had movement in all extremities" and would remain hospitalized with more testing planned. By Tuesday afternoon, it was reported by Bowles that Gage was planned to be released from the hospital by the end of the day.

In 2023 during training camp, Gage suffered a torn patellar tendon and was placed on injured reserve on August 21, 2023. On March 11, 2024, the Buccaneers chose to not pick up the option for the last year of Gage's contract, making him a free agent in the 2024 offseason.

=== Baltimore Ravens ===
On August 6, 2024, Gage signed with the Baltimore Ravens. On August 26, he was released by the Ravens as part of final roster cuts for the start of the 2024 season.

=== San Francisco 49ers ===
On November 5, 2024, Gage was signed to the San Francisco 49ers' practice squad. He signed a reserve/future contract with San Francisco on January 7, 2025.

On August 26, 2025, Gage was released by the 49ers as part of final roster cuts; he was re-signed to the active roster two days later. He was released again on September 3 and subsequently re-signed to the practice squad. On November 19, Gage was released by the 49ers.

== NFL career statistics ==
Year	Team	Games		Receiving					
Year	Team	GP	GS	Tgt	Rec	Yds	Avg	Lng	TD
2018	ATL	15	0	10	6	63	10.5	22	0
2019	ATL	16	4	74	49	446	9.1	19	1
2020	ATL	16	8	110	72	786	10.9	35	4
2021	ATL	14	9	94	66	770	11.7	49	4
2022	TB	13	13	70	51	426	8.4	23	5
2023	TB	0	0	Did not play due to injury					
Total		74	34	357	244	2,491	10.1	49	14
