= 2022 Pro Bowl =

National Football League all-star game

2022 NFL Pro Bowl
NFC	AFC
35	41
Head coach: Matt LaFleur (Green Bay Packers)	Head coach: Mike Vrabel (Tennessee Titans)
	1	2	3	4	Total
NFC	13	8	0	14	35
AFC	14	14	13	0	41
- Date: February 6, 2022
- Stadium: Allegiant Stadium, Las Vegas, Nevada
- Offensive MVP: Justin Herbert, QB (Los Angeles Chargers)
- Defensive MVP: Maxx Crosby, DE (Las Vegas Raiders)
- Referee: Tony Corrente
- Attendance: 56,206

Ceremonies
- National anthem: Tim Brown and the NFL Players Choir
- Halftime show: Jabbawockeez

TV in the United States
- Network: ESPN; ABC; Disney XD
- Announcers: Steve Levy, Brian Griese, Louis Riddick and Lisa Salters

Radio in the United States
- Network: Westwood One
- Announcers: Ryan Radtke (play-by-play); Tony Boselli (color commentator); Amber Theoharis (sideline reporter)

The 2022 Pro Bowl was the National Football League all-star game for the 2021 NFL season. It was played at Allegiant Stadium in Paradise, Nevada, on February 6, 2022. ESPN, ABC and Disney XD had the national television rights. Voting for the game started on November 16. The entire roster was announced on December 22. Mike Vrabel from the Tennessee Titans coached the AFC team, while Matt LaFleur from the Green Bay Packers coached the NFC team. This was the most recent traditional Pro Bowl game, as the NFL announced a switch in format for the 2022 season that included several skill competitions and a flag football game.

== Background ==
The league awarded the game to Allegiant Stadium, as a make-up for the 2021 Pro Bowl, which was originally scheduled to be held in that stadium before the COVID-19 pandemic forced alternative festivities to take place instead of an actual game. With the league expanding the regular season from a 16-game schedule to 17 games, the Pro Bowl was moved from the last weekend in January to the first weekend in February.

== Summary ==
=== Box score ===
2022 Pro Bowl: NFC at AFC

Quarter	1	2	3	4	Total
NFC	13	8	0	14	35
AFC	14	14	13	0	41

at Allegiant Stadium, Paradise, Nevada

- Date: February 6, 2022
- Game time: 3:00 p.m. EST/12:00 p.m. PST
- Game weather: None (indoor stadium)
- Game attendance: 56,206
- Referee: Tony Corrente
- TV announcers (ESPN/ABC/Disney XD): Steve Levy, Brian Griese, Louis Riddick, and Lisa Salters
- Recap, Game Book

Scoring summary

Quarter	Time	Drive			Team	Scoring information	Score	
Quarter	Time	Plays	Yards	TOP	Team	Scoring information	NFC	AFC
1	12:00	–	–	–	AFC	Interception returned 45 yards for touchdown by Shaquille Leonard, Justin Tucker kick good	0	7
1	9:57	4	39	1:53	NFC	Kyle Juszczyk 14-yard touchdown reception from Kirk Cousins, Jake Elliott kick good	7	7
1	9:26	1	15	0:07	AFC	Mark Andrews 15-yard touchdown reception from Justin Herbert, Justin Tucker kick good	7	14
1	0:00	–	–	–	NFC	Interception returned 63 yards for touchdown by Antoine Winfield Jr., 2-point pass failed	13	14
2	14:48	–	–	–	AFC	Fumble recovery returned 22 yards for touchdown by Myles Garrett, 2-point pass complete	13	22
2	10:41	7	35	3:46	NFC	Mike Evans 19-yard touchdown reception from Kyler Murray, 2-point pass complete	21	22
2	5:01	4	53	2:08	AFC	Mark Andrews 7-yard touchdown reception from Justin Herbert, 2-point run failed	21	28
3	7:24	13	95	7:36	AFC	Hunter Renfrow 6-yard touchdown reception from Mac Jones, 2-point pass failed	21	34
3	1:39	7	28	4:17	AFC	Stefon Diggs 4-yard touchdown run, Justin Tucker kick good	21	41
4	10:18	13	75	6:21	NFC	Kyle Pitts 5-yard touchdown reception from Kyler Murray, Jake Elliott kick good	28	41
4	2:36	6	36	1:11	NFC	Dalvin Cook 5-yard touchdown reception from Kyler Murray, Jake Elliott kick good	35	41
"TOP" = time of possession. For other American football terms, see Glossary of American football.							35	41

In the first quarter and a half, the NFC matched the AFC touchdown for touchdown, with the latter team leading by one due an unsuccessful two-point conversion after the NFC's second touchdown. After the AFC scored another touchdown before halftime, they continued to extend their lead in the third quarter with two more touchdowns, which gave them a 20-point lead at the end of that quarter. The NFC attempted a comeback, scoring 14 unanswered points in the fourth quarter, but the AFC took back and kept possession for the final two and a half minutes, securing their fifth consecutive Pro Bowl win.

=== Statistics ===
Statistics	NFC	AFC
First downs	18	19
Total yards	287	315
Rushes–yards	8–1	21–52
Passing yards	286	263
Passing: Comp–Att	33–54	25–38
Time of possession	28:11	31:49
Turnovers	5	3

Team	Category	Player	Statistics
NFC	Passing	Kyler Murray	18/27, 160 yards, 3 TD, INT
NFC	Rushing	Justin Jefferson	1 carry, 7 yards
NFC	Receiving	Mike Evans	2 receptions, 50 yards, TD
AFC	Passing	Mac Jones	12/16, 112 yards, TD, INT
AFC	Rushing	Nick Chubb	6 carries, 17 yards
AFC	Receiving	Mark Andrews	5 receptions, 82 yards, 2 TD

=== Starting lineups ===
Starting lineups are based on the lineups provided in the gamebook for the game. The only exception, since neither team ran their first play on offense with a fullback, is the fullback has been swapped out for the additional tight end for the NFC and additional wide receiver for the AFC.

NFC	Position	AFC
Offense
Justin Jefferson	WR	Tyreek Hill
George Kittle	TE	Mark Andrews
D. J. Humphries	LT	Rashawn Slater
Ali Marpet	LG	Joel Bitonio
Ryan Jensen	C	Corey Linsley
Laken Tomlinson	RG	Wyatt Teller
Brian O'Neill	RT	Orlando Brown Jr.
Deebo Samuel	WR	Stefon Diggs
Kyler Murray	QB	Justin Herbert
Dalvin Cook	RB	Jonathan Taylor
Kyle Juszczyk	FB	Patrick Ricard
Defense
Cam Jordan	DE	Myles Garrett
Jonathan Allen	DT	DeForest Buckner
Javon Hargrave	DT	Cameron Heyward
Brian Burns	DE	Maxx Crosby
Chandler Jones	OLB	T. J. Watt
Micah Parsons	MLB	Shaquille Leonard
Robert Quinn	OLB	Matthew Judon
Budda Baker	SS	Derwin James
Harrison Smith	FS	Kevin Byard
Trevon Diggs	CB	J. C. Jackson
Darius Slay	CB	Xavien Howard

== AFC roster ==
=== Offense ===
Position	Starter(s)	Reserve(s)	Alternate(s)
Quarterback	10 Justin Herbert, LA Chargers	15 Patrick Mahomes, Kansas City; 8 Lamar Jackson, Baltimore^{[b]}	10 Mac Jones, New England^{[a]}
Running back	28 Jonathan Taylor, Indianapolis	24 Nick Chubb, Cleveland; 28 Joe Mixon, Cincinnati^{[d]}	22 Najee Harris, Pittsburgh^{[a]}
Fullback	42 Patrick Ricard, Baltimore		
Wide receiver	10 Tyreek Hill, Kansas City; 1 Ja'Marr Chase, Cincinnati^{[d]}	14 Stefon Diggs, Buffalo; 13 Keenan Allen, LA Chargers^{[b]}	13 Hunter Renfrow, Las Vegas^{[a]} 18 Diontae Johnson, Pittsburgh^{[a]}
Tight end	89 Mark Andrews, Baltimore	87 Travis Kelce, Kansas City	
Offensive tackle	70 Rashawn Slater, LA Chargers; 57 Orlando Brown Jr., Kansas City	73 Dion Dawkins, Buffalo	
Offensive guard	56 Quenton Nelson, Indianapolis^{[b]} 75 Joel Bitonio, Cleveland	77 Wyatt Teller, Cleveland	76 Rodger Saffold, Tennessee^{[a]}
Center	63 Corey Linsley, LA Chargers	78 Ryan Kelly, Indianapolis	

=== Defense ===
Position	Starter(s)	Reserve(s)	Alternate(s)
Defensive end	95 Myles Garrett, Cleveland; 98 Maxx Crosby, Las Vegas	91 Trey Hendrickson, Cincinnati^{[d]}	55 Frank Clark, Kansas City^{[a]}
Defensive tackle	99 DeForest Buckner, Indianapolis; 95 Chris Jones, Kansas City^{[b]}	97 Cameron Heyward, Pittsburgh	98 Jeffery Simmons, Tennessee^{[a]}
Outside linebacker	90 T. J. Watt, Pittsburgh; 97 Joey Bosa, LA Chargers^{[b]}	9 Matthew Judon, New England	58 Harold Landry, Tennessee^{[a]}
Inside linebacker	53 Darius Leonard, Indianapolis	52 Denzel Perryman, Las Vegas	
Cornerback	27 J. C. Jackson, New England; 25 Xavien Howard, Miami	21 Denzel Ward, Cleveland; 23 Kenny Moore II, Indianapolis	
Free safety	31 Kevin Byard, Tennessee	32 Tyrann Mathieu, Kansas City^{[C]}	
Strong safety	33 Derwin James, LA Chargers		

=== Special teams ===
Position	Starter(s)	Alternate(s)
Punter	6 A. J. Cole III, Las Vegas	
Placekicker	9 Justin Tucker, Baltimore	
Return specialist	13 Devin Duvernay, Baltimore	
Special teams	18 Matthew Slater, New England	
Long snapper	46 Luke Rhodes, Indianapolis	

bold player who participated in game
italics signifies a rookie
(C) signifies the player has been selected as a captain
^{a} Replacement player selection due to injury or vacancy
^{b} Injured player; selected but did not participate
^{c} Replacement Player; selected as reserve
^{d} Selected but did not play because his team advanced to Super Bowl LVI (See Pro Bowl "Player selection" section)
^{e} Selected but chose not to participate
^{f} Selected as starter, but relinquished that role

== NFC roster ==
=== Offense ===
Position	Starter(s)	Reserve(s)	Alternate(s)
Quarterback	12 Aaron Rodgers, Green Bay^{[b]}	12 Tom Brady, Tampa Bay^{[f]} 1 Kyler Murray, Arizona	8 Kirk Cousins, Minnesota^{[a]} 3 Russell Wilson, Seattle^{[a]}
Running back	33 Dalvin Cook, Minnesota	6 James Conner, Arizona; 41 Alvin Kamara, New Orleans	
Fullback	44 Kyle Juszczyk, San Francisco		
Wide receiver	10 Cooper Kupp, LA Rams^{[d]} 17 Davante Adams, Green Bay^{[b]}	18 Justin Jefferson, Minnesota; 19 Deebo Samuel, San Francisco	13 Mike Evans, Tampa Bay^{[a]} 88 CeeDee Lamb, Dallas^{[a]}
Tight end	85 George Kittle, San Francisco	8 Kyle Pitts, Atlanta	
Offensive tackle	71 Trent Williams, San Francisco^{[b]} 78 Tristan Wirfs, Tampa Bay^{[b]}	77 Tyron Smith, Dallas^{[b]}	76 Duane Brown, Seattle^{[a]} 75 Brian O'Neill, Minnesota^{[a]} 74 D. J. Humphries, Arizona^{[a]}
Offensive guard	70 Zack Martin, Dallas^{[b]} 75 Brandon Scherff, Washington^{[b]}	74 Ali Marpet, Tampa Bay	73 Jonah Jackson, Detroit^{[a]} 75 Laken Tomlinson, San Francisco^{[a]}
Center	62 Jason Kelce, Philadelphia^{[b]}	66 Ryan Jensen, Tampa Bay	50 Alex Mack, San Francisco^{[a]}

=== Defense ===
Position	Starter(s)	Reserve(s)	Alternate(s)
Defensive end	97 Nick Bosa, San Francisco^{[b]} 53 Brian Burns, Carolina	94 Cameron Jordan, New Orleans	94 Josh Sweat, Philadelphia^{[a]}
Defensive tackle	99 Aaron Donald, LA Rams^{[d]} 93 Jonathan Allen, Washington	97 Kenny Clark, Green Bay^{[b]}	97 Javon Hargrave, Philadelphia^{[a]} 50 Vita Vea, Tampa Bay^{[a]}
Outside linebacker	55 Chandler Jones, Arizona; 94 Robert Quinn, Chicago	58 Shaquil Barrett, Tampa Bay	
Inside linebacker	11 Micah Parsons, Dallas	54 Bobby Wagner, Seattle^{[b]}	45 Devin White, Tampa Bay^{[a]}
Cornerback	7 Trevon Diggs, Dallas; 5 Jalen Ramsey, LA Rams^{[d]}	2 Darius Slay, Philadelphia; 23 Marshon Lattimore, New Orleans	9 Stephon Gilmore, Carolina^{[a]}
Free safety	6 Quandre Diggs, Seattle^{[b]}	22 Harrison Smith, Minnesota	31 Antoine Winfield Jr., Tampa Bay^{[a]}
Strong safety	3 Budda Baker, Arizona		

=== Special teams ===
Position	Starter(s)	Alternate(s)
Punter	5 Bryan Anger, Dallas	
Placekicker	8 Matt Gay, LA Rams^{[d]}	4 Jake Elliott, Philadelphia^{[a]}
Return specialist	17 Jakeem Grant, Chicago	
Special teams	48 J. T. Gray, New Orleans	
Long snapper	47 Josh Harris, Atlanta	

bold player who participated in game
italics signifies a rookie
(C) signifies the player has been selected as a captain
^{a} Replacement player selection due to injury or vacancy
^{b} Injured player; selected but did not participate
^{c} Replacement player; selected as reserve
^{d} Selected but did not play because his team advanced to Super Bowl LVI (See Pro Bowl "Player selection" section)
^{e} Selected but chose not to participate
^{f} Selected but did not play due to initially retiring

== Number of selections per team ==
American Football Conference
Team	Selections
Baltimore Ravens	5
Buffalo Bills	2
Cincinnati Bengals	3
Cleveland Browns	5
Denver Broncos	0
Houston Texans	0
Indianapolis Colts	7
Jacksonville Jaguars	0
Kansas City Chiefs	7
Las Vegas Raiders	4
Los Angeles Chargers	6
Miami Dolphins	1
New England Patriots	4
New York Jets	0
Pittsburgh Steelers	4
Tennessee Titans	4

National Football Conference
Team	Selections
Arizona Cardinals	4
Atlanta Falcons	2
Carolina Panthers	2
Chicago Bears	2
Dallas Cowboys	6
Detroit Lions	1
Green Bay Packers	3
Los Angeles Rams	4
Minnesota Vikings	5
New Orleans Saints	4
New York Giants	0
Philadelphia Eagles	5
San Francisco 49ers	7
Seattle Seahawks	4
Tampa Bay Buccaneers	9
Washington Football Team	2

== Broadcasting ==
The game was televised nationally in the United States by ESPN, and simulcast on ABC and Disney XD.
