= Mykal Walker =

American football player (born 1997)

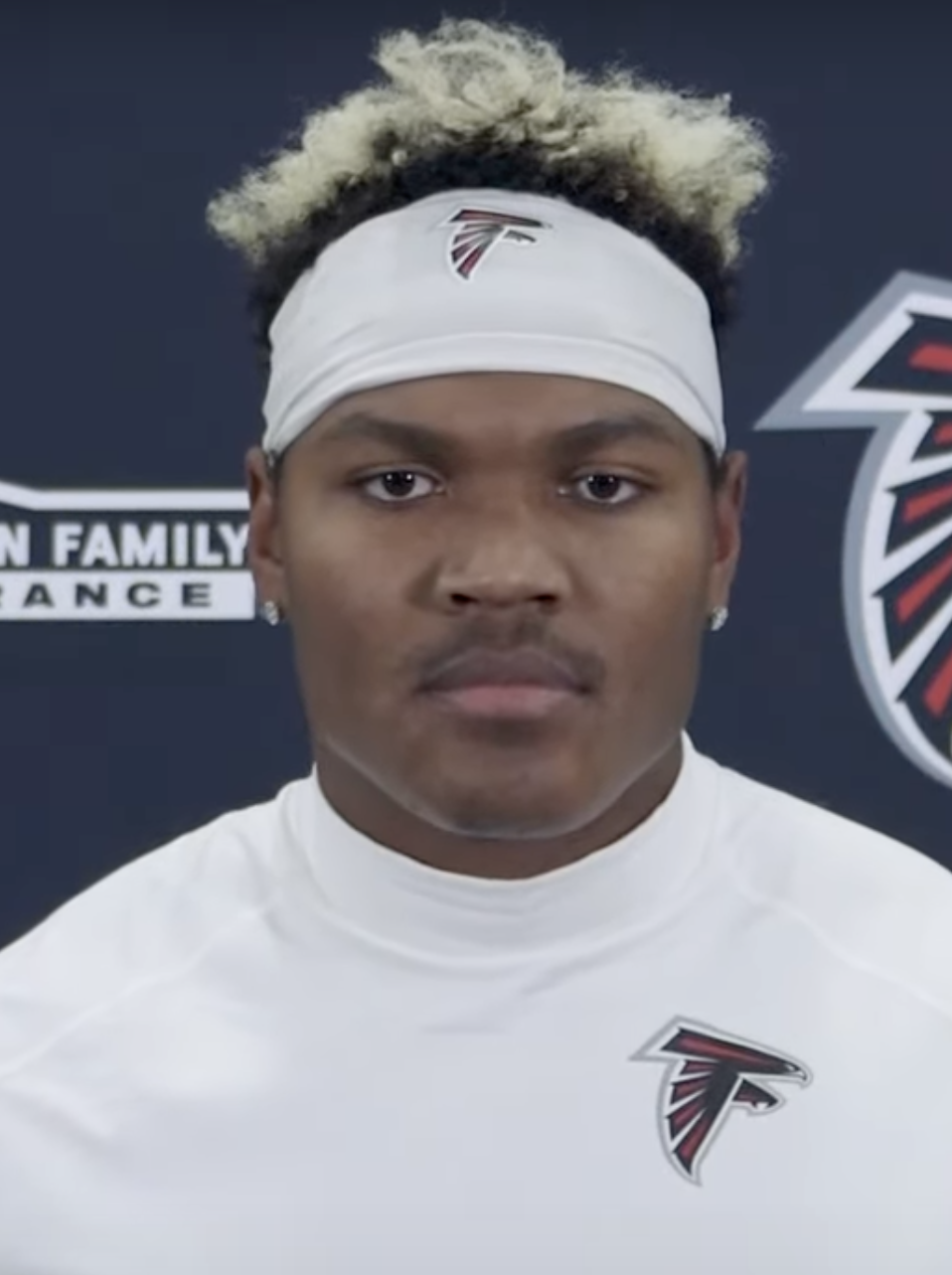
- Walker with the Atlanta Falcons in 2021

No. 45 – New York Jets
- Position: Linebacker
- Roster status: Practice squad

Personal information
- Born: August 28, 1997 (age 29); Fresno, California, U.S.
- Listed height: 6 ft 3 in (1.91 m)
- Listed weight: 230 lb (104 kg)

Career information
- High school: Vacaville (Vacaville, California)
- College: Azusa Pacific (2015–2016); Fresno State (2017–2019)
- NFL draft: 2020: 4th round, 119th overall pick

Career history
- Atlanta Falcons (2020–2022); Chicago Bears (2023)*; Las Vegas Raiders (2023)*; Pittsburgh Steelers (2023); Washington Commanders (2024); Arizona Cardinals (2025)*; New York Jets (2025–present)
- * Offseason or practice squad member only

Awards and highlights
- First-team All-MW (2018, 2019)

Career NFL statistics as of 2025
- Tackles: 272
- Sacks: 1
- Forced fumbles: 1
- Fumble recoveries: 3
- Pass deflections: 14
- Interceptions: 4
- Touchdowns: 1
- Stats at Pro Football Reference

Mykal Walker (born August 28, 1997) is an American professional football linebacker for the New York Jets of the National Football League (NFL). He played college football for the Azusa Pacific Cougars and Fresno State Bulldogs and was selected by the Atlanta Falcons in the fourth round of the 2020 NFL draft. Walker has also been a member of the Chicago Bears, Las Vegas Raiders, Pittsburgh Steelers, and Washington Commanders.

== College career ==
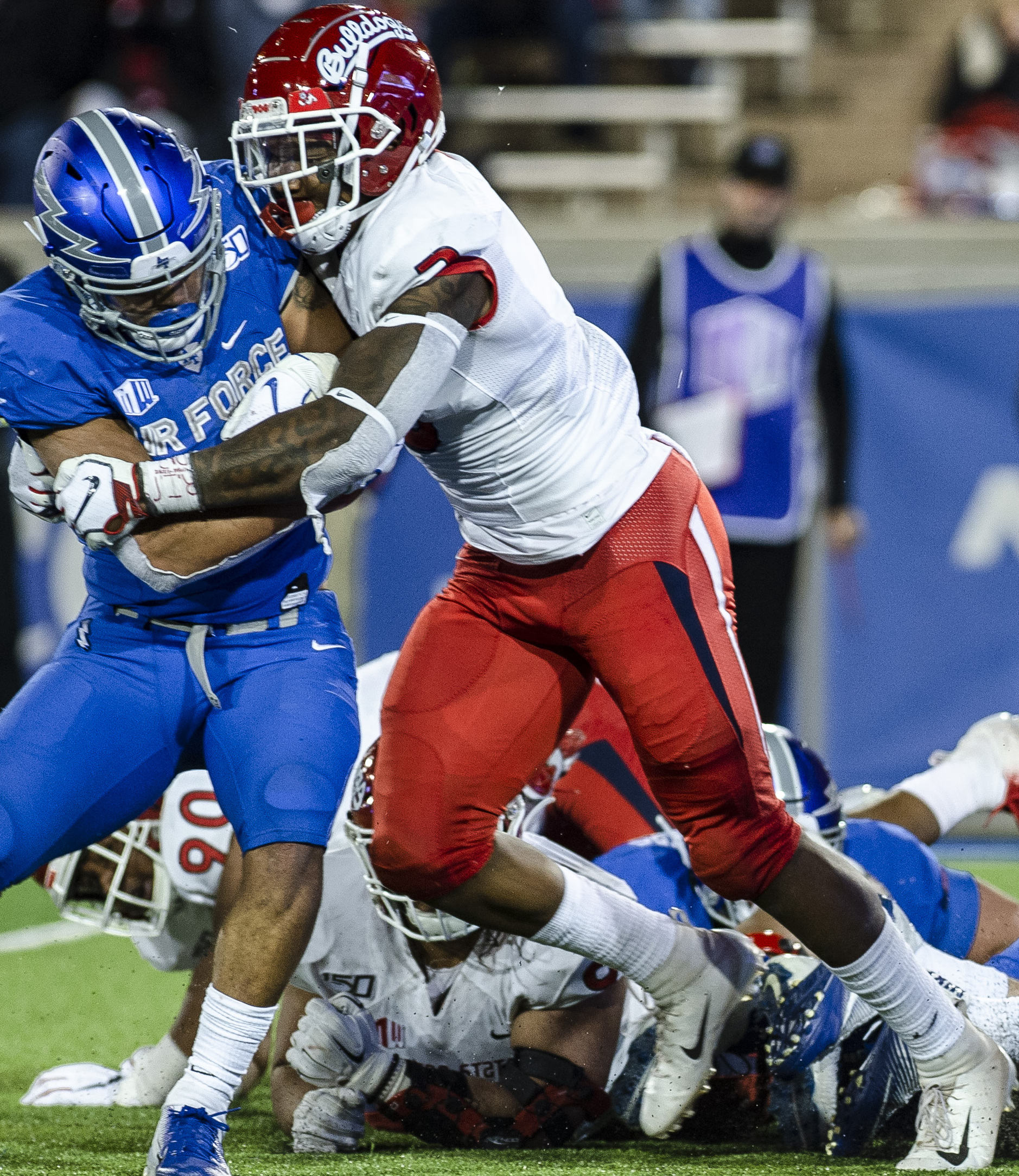
Walker with the Fresno State Bulldogs in 2019

Walker played two seasons at Azusa Pacific University before transferring to Fresno State. In 2019, he had 91 tackles, 11.5 tackles for loss and 5 pass deflections. Walker finished his two seasons at Fresno State with 182 tackles including 22.5 tackles for a loss, 10 pass defenses and 6.5 sacks. Walker was named a two-time First-team All-Mountain West Conference selection, along with being named the Defensive MVP during the 2018 Mountain West Conference Football Championship Game. Walker ran the 40-yard dash in 4.65 seconds.

== Professional career ==
Pre-draft measurables
Height	Weight	Arm length	Hand span	Wingspan	40-yard dash	10-yard split	20-yard split	20-yard shuttle	Three-cone drill	Vertical jump	Broad jump	Bench press
6 ft 3 in (1.91 m)	230 lb (104 kg)	32 1/2 in (0.83 m)	10 in (0.25 m)	6 ft 7 7/8 in (2.03 m)	4.65 s	1.56 s	2.73 s	4.25 s	7.09 s	33.0 in (0.84 m)	10 ft 2 in (3.10 m)	20 reps
All values from NFL Combine

=== Atlanta Falcons ===
Walker was selected by the Atlanta Falcons with the 119th overall pick in the fourth round of the 2020 NFL draft.

In Week 14 of the 2021 season, Walker intercepted Cam Newton and returned it 66 yards for a touchdown in a 29-21 win over the Carolina Panthers.

On August 13, 2023, the Falcons waived Walker.

=== Chicago Bears ===
On August 14, 2023, the Chicago Bears claimed Walker off waivers. He was waived on August 29, 2023.

=== Las Vegas Raiders ===
On September 19, 2023, Walker signed with the practice squad of the Las Vegas Raiders. He was released on October 24.

=== Pittsburgh Steelers ===
On October 30, 2023, Walker signed with the practice squad of the Pittsburgh Steelers. On November 18, he was signed to the Steelers' active roster.

=== Washington Commanders ===
On April 2, 2024, Walker signed with the Washington Commanders. Over 17 games, he finished the 2024 regular season with 21 tackles and one fumble recovery.

=== Arizona Cardinals ===
On March 13, 2025, Walker signed a one-year contract with the Arizona Cardinals. He was released on August 26 as part of final roster cuts.

=== New York Jets ===
On September 1, 2025, Walker was signed to the New York Jets' practice squad. On October 4, he was signed to the active roster.

On March 13, 2026, Walker re-signed with the Jets on a one-year, $1.4 million contract. He was placed on injured reserve due to a calf injury on August 30. On September 3, Walker was released by the Jets with an injury settlement. He was re-signed to the practice squad on November 9.

== Personal life ==
Mykal Walker has a twin brother Malyk. Their father, Michael, played for the Fresno State Bulldogs football team and subsequently joined the New England Patriots, but never played at the NFL level. Michael died of colon cancer in 2012. Mykal Walker's first child, a son, was born in December 2021. His cousin is former NFL football running-back Maurice Jones-Drew.
