= Darren Hall (American football) =

American football player (born 2000)

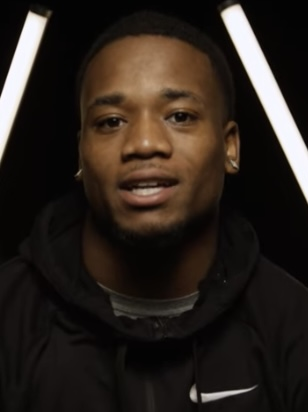
- Hall in 2021

Profile
- Position: Safety

Personal information
- Born: May 2, 2000 (age 26); Baldwin Park, California, U.S.
- Listed height: 6 ft 0 in (1.83 m)
- Listed weight: 195 lb (88 kg)

Career information
- High school: Rancho Cucamonga (Rancho Cucamonga, California)
- College: San Diego State (2017–2020)
- NFL draft: 2021: 4th round, 108th overall pick

Career history
- Atlanta Falcons (2021–2022); Indianapolis Colts (2023)*; Arizona Cardinals (2024); Indianapolis Colts (2024); Arizona Cardinals (2024–2025); Atlanta Falcons (2026)*; Washington Commanders (2026)*
- * Offseason or practice squad member only

Career NFL statistics as of 2026
- Total tackles: 95
- Sacks: 1
- Pass deflections: 6
- Forced fumbles: 1
- Fumble recoveries: 1
- Stats at Pro Football Reference

Darren Reginald Hall (born May 2, 2000) is an American professional football safety. He played college football for the San Diego State Aztecs.

== College career ==
Hall attended and played college football at San Diego State from 2017 to 2020.

== Professional career ==
Pre-draft measurables
Height	Weight	Arm length	Hand span	Wingspan	40-yard dash	10-yard split	20-yard split	20-yard shuttle	Three-cone drill	Vertical jump	Broad jump	Bench press
5 ft 11 1/4 in (1.81 m)	188 lb (85 kg)	30 5/8 in (0.78 m)	8 7/8 in (0.23 m)	6 ft 0 7/8 in (1.85 m)	4.41 s	1.58 s	2.62 s	4.22 s	7.12 s	38.5 in (0.98 m)	11 ft 0 in (3.35 m)	16 reps
All values from Pro Day

=== Atlanta Falcons (first stint) ===
Hall was selected by the Atlanta Falcons in the fourth round, 108th overall, of the 2021 NFL draft. He signed his four-year rookie contract with Atlanta on June 17, 2021. He made his NFL debut in Week 3 of the 2021 season against the New York Giants. He made his first start in Week 17 against the Buffalo Bills. He appeared in 14 games as a rookie. He finished with one sack, 27 total tackles, and three passes defensed.

Hall appeared in all 17 games in 2022 and started nine. He finished with 45 total tackles, three passes defensed, one forced fumble, and one fumble recovery.

On August 29, 2023, Hall was waived by the Falcons.

=== Indianapolis Colts (first stint) ===
On August 31, 2023, Hall was signed to the practice squad of the Indianapolis Colts. He was released on September 30, then re-signed a week later. He was not re-signed by the Colts to a reserve/future contract and thus became a free agent at the end of the season.

=== Arizona Cardinals (first stint) ===
On January 9, 2024, Hall signed a reserve/future contract with the Arizona Cardinals. He was waived on November 4.

=== Indianapolis Colts (second stint) ===
On November 5, 2024, Hall was claimed off waivers by the Indianapolis Colts. He was waived on December 21.

=== Arizona Cardinals (second stint) ===
On December 24, 2024, Hall was signed to the Arizona Cardinals' practice squad. He signed a reserve/future contract on January 6, 2025.

On August 26, 2025, Hall was waived by the Cardinals as part of final roster cuts and re-signed to the practice squad the next day. On September 17, he was signed to the active roster. On October 27, Hall was waived and re-signed to the practice squad the next day. He was promoted back to the active roster on November 22.

=== Atlanta Falcons (second stint) ===
On May 7, 2026, Hall signed with the Atlanta Falcons. He was placed on injured reserve on August 29. Hall was released by Atlanta on September 8.

=== Washington Commanders ===
On October 7, 2026, the Washington Commanders signed Hall to their practice squad. He was released on October 20.

== NFL career statistics ==
Legend
**Bold**	Career high

=== Regular season ===
Year	Team	Games		Tackles					Interceptions						Fumbles				
Year	Team	GP	GS	Cmb	Solo	Ast	Sck	TFL	Int	Yds	Avg	Lng	TD	PD	FF	Fum	FR	Yds	TD
2021	ATL	14	1	27	21	6	**1.0**	**2**	0	0	0.0	0	0	**3**	0	0	0	0	0
2022	ATL	17	9	**45**	**29**	**16**	0.0	1	0	0	0.0	0	0	**3**	**1**	0	**1**	**3**	0
2024	ARI	4	0	1	1	0	0.0	0	0	0	0.0	0	0	0	0	0	0	0	0
2025	ARI	13	2	21	8	13	0.0	0	0	0	0.0	0	0	0	0	0	0	0	0
Career		48	12	94	59	35	1.0	3	0	0	0.0	0	0	6	1	0	1	3	0
