= Josh Harris (long snapper) =

American football player (born 1989)

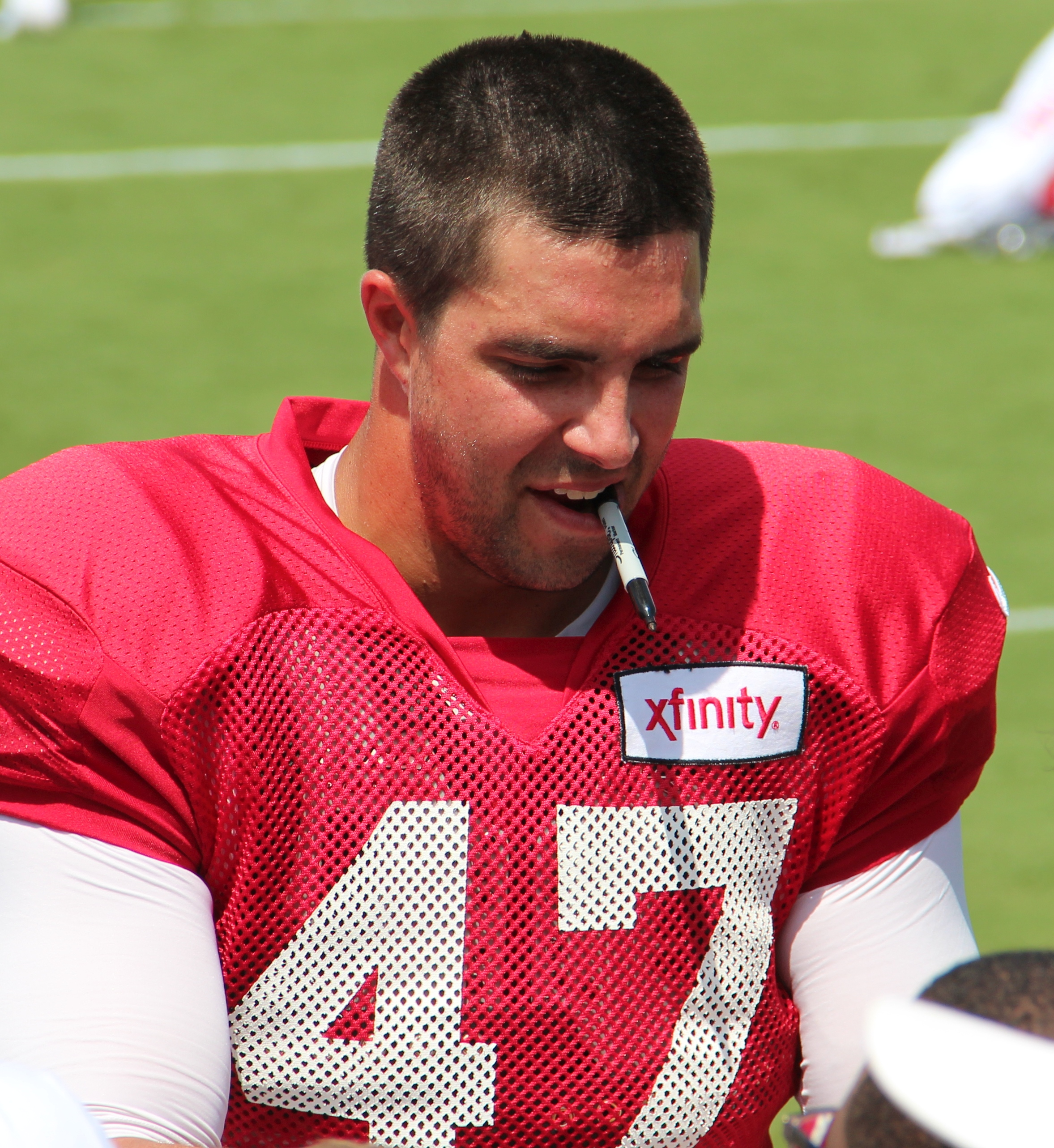
- Harris with the Atlanta Falcons in 2016

No. 47 – Los Angeles Chargers
- Position: Long snapper
- Roster status: Active

Personal information
- Born: April 27, 1989 (age 37); Fulda, Germany
- Listed height: 6 ft 1 in (1.85 m)
- Listed weight: 224 lb (102 kg)

Career information
- High school: Carrollton (Carrollton, Georgia, U.S.)
- College: Auburn (2007–2011)
- NFL draft: 2012: undrafted

Career history
- Atlanta Falcons (2012–2021); Los Angeles Chargers (2022–present)

Awards and highlights
- Second-team All-Pro (2021); Pro Bowl (2021); BCS national champion (2010)

Career NFL statistics as of Week 10, 2026
- Games played: 224
- Total tackles: 39
- Stats at Pro Football Reference

Josh Harris (born April 27, 1989) is an American professional football long snapper for the Los Angeles Chargers of the National Football League (NFL). He played college football for the Auburn Tigers. He signed with the Falcons as an undrafted free agent in 2012.

== Early life ==
Harris attended Carrollton High School in Carrollton, Georgia, where he was a three sport athlete in football, wrestling, and baseball.

== Professional career ==
Pre-draft measurables
Height	Weight	Arm length	Hand span	Wingspan	40-yard dash	10-yard split	20-yard split	20-yard shuttle	Three-cone drill	Vertical jump	Broad jump	Bench press
6 ft 1 1/8 in (1.86 m)	252 lb (114 kg)	31 3/4 in (0.81 m)	10 in (0.25 m)	6 ft 3 1/4 in (1.91 m)	4.82 s	1.65 s	2.79 s	4.19 s	7.17 s	31.0 in (0.79 m)	9 ft 11 in (3.02 m)	16 reps
All values from NFL Combine/Pro Day

=== Atlanta Falcons ===
Harris signed as an undrafted free agent with the Atlanta Falcons on April 26, 2012, following the 2012 NFL draft. He was selected over veteran Joe Zelenka in the pre-season, when the roster was cut down to 53 players. He made his NFL debut in the Week 1 win against the Kansas City Chiefs.

On September 17, 2014, Harris signed a four-year contract extension with the Falcons.

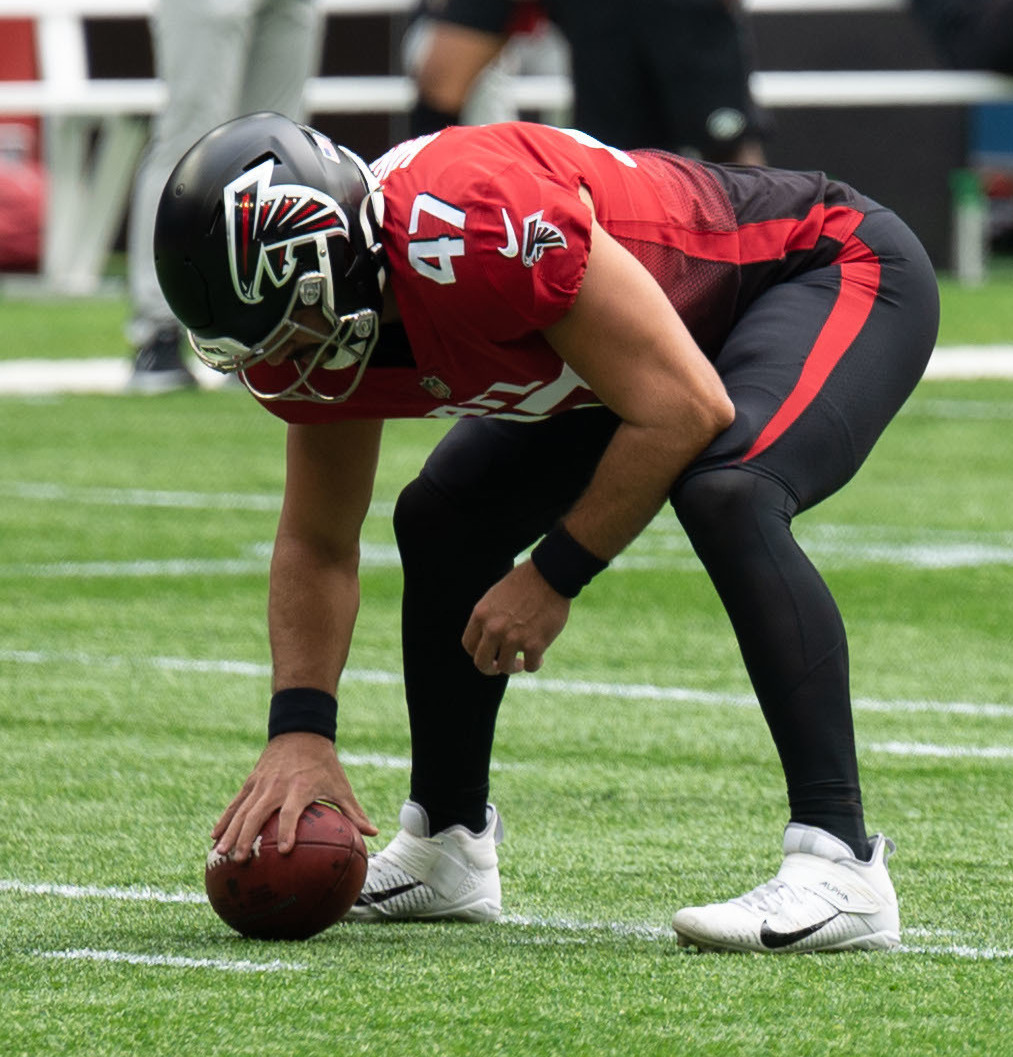
Harris with the Falcons in 2021

In the 2016 season, Harris and the Falcons reached Super Bowl LI, where they faced the New England Patriots on February 5, 2017, losing 28–34 in overtime.

On November 2, 2018, Harris signed a three-year contract extension with the Falcons through the 2021 season.

On December 4, 2018, Harris was placed on injured reserve with a hip injury.

On September 1, 2021, Harris was waived from the Falcons, only to be re-signed the next day. On December 22, Harris was selected to his first Pro Bowl, and would be later awarded second-team All-Pro for his work during the 2021 season.

=== Los Angeles Chargers ===
On March 16, 2022, Harris signed a four-year, $5.6 million contract with the Los Angeles Chargers.

On August 26, 2025, Harris was placed on injured reserve due to an undisclosed injury, requiring him to miss at least the first four games of the season. He was activated on November 8, ahead of the team's Week 10 matchup against the Pittsburgh Steelers.

On March 11, 2026, Harris re-signed with the Chargers on a one-year, $1.82 million contract.
