= Kyle Pitts =

American football player (born 2000)

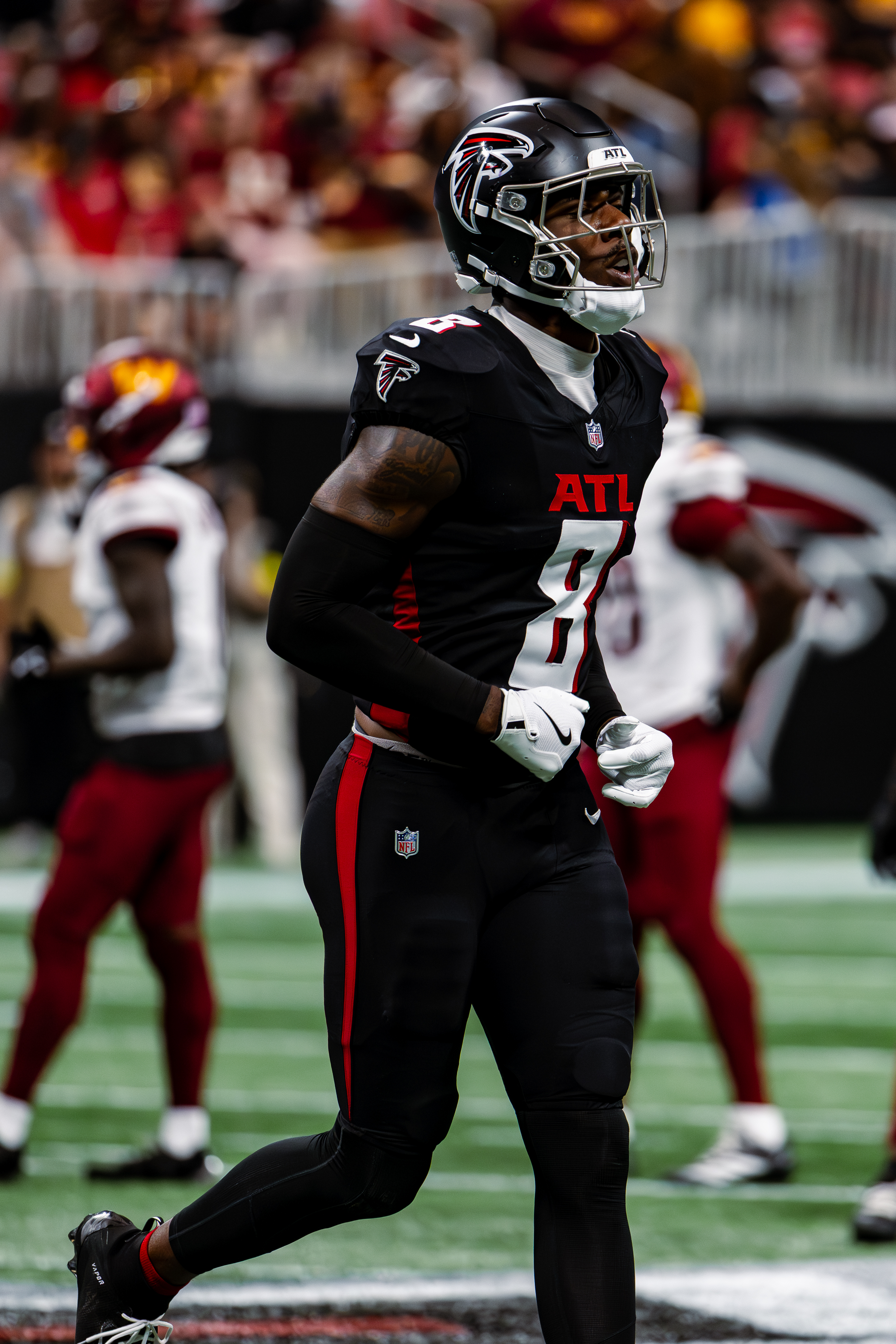
- Pitts with the Atlanta Falcons in 2025

No. 8 – Atlanta Falcons
- Position: Tight end
- Roster status: Active

Personal information
- Born: October 6, 2000 (age 26); Philadelphia, Pennsylvania, U.S.
- Listed height: 6 ft 6 in (1.98 m)
- Listed weight: 250 lb (113 kg)

Career information
- High school: Archbishop Wood (Warminster, Pennsylvania)
- College: Florida (2018–2020)
- NFL draft: 2021: 1st round, 4th overall pick

Career history
- Atlanta Falcons (2021–present)

Awards and highlights
- Second-team All-Pro (2025); Pro Bowl (2021); PFWA All-Rookie Team (2021); John Mackey Award (2020); Unanimous All-American (2020); 2× First-team All-SEC (2019, 2020)

Career NFL statistics as of Week 7, 2026
- Receptions: 304
- Receiving yards: 3,770
- Receiving touchdowns: 19
- Stats at Pro Football Reference

Kyle Anthony Pitts Sr. (born October 6, 2000) is an American professional football tight end for the Atlanta Falcons of the National Football League (NFL). He played college football for the Florida Gators, where he was named a unanimous All-American and won the John Mackey Award in 2020.

Pitts was selected fourth overall by the Falcons in the 2021 NFL draft, making him the highest drafted tight end in NFL history. He was later named to the Pro Bowl as a rookie.

== Early life ==
Pitts originally attended Abington Senior High School in Abington, Pennsylvania before transferring to Archbishop Wood Catholic High School in Warminster, Pennsylvania in 2016. He played tight end and defensive end on the football team. Pitts played in the 2018 Under Armour All-America Game. He committed to the University of Florida to play college football.

College recruiting
| Name | Hometown | School | Height | Weight | 40^{‡} | Commit date |
|---|---|---|---|---|---|---|
| Kyle Pitts; TE | Warminster, PA | Archbishop Wood | 6 ft 5.5 in (1.97 m) | 235 lb (107 kg) | 4.70 s | Jul 20, 2017 |
| Kyle Pitts; TE | Recruit ratings: Rivals: 247Sports: ESPN: | | | | | |
Overall recruit ranking:
‡ Refers to 40-yard dash; Note: In many cases, Scout, Rivals, 247Sports, On3, and ESPN may conflict in their listings of height, weight and 40 time.; In these cases, the average was taken. ESPN grades are on a 100-point scale.; Sources: "2018 Team Ranking". Rivals.com.

== College career ==
Pitts played in 11 games as a backup his true freshman season at Florida in 2018. He finished the year with three receptions for 73 yards and a touchdown. In 2019, he took over as the starting tight end. Pitts played in all 13 games his sophomore season at Florida in 2019. He finished the year with 54 receptions for 649 yards and 5 touchdowns. Pitts earned First-team All-Southeastern Conference for the season.

During the 2020 season, curtailed by the COVID-19 pandemic, Pitts scored 12 touchdowns in eight games while gaining 770 yards on 43 receptions. He was named a unanimous All-American and won the John Mackey Award as the most outstanding tight end in college football for the season.

== Professional career ==
Pre-draft measurables
| Height | Weight | Arm length | Hand span | Wingspan | 40-yard dash | 10-yard split | 20-yard split | 20-yard shuttle | Three-cone drill | Vertical jump | Broad jump | Bench press |
|---|---|---|---|---|---|---|---|---|---|---|---|---|
| 6 ft 5 5/8 in (1.97 m) | 245 lb (111 kg) | 33 1/2 in (0.85 m) | 10 5/8 in (0.27 m) | 6 ft 11 3/8 in (2.12 m) | 4.40 s | 1.55 s | 2.59 s | 4.35 s | 7.12 s | 33.5 in (0.85 m) | 10 ft 9 in (3.28 m) | 22 reps |
All values from Pro Day

=== 2021 season ===
Pitts was selected in the first round with the fourth overall by the Atlanta Falcons in the 2021 NFL draft, making him the highest drafted tight end in NFL history. He signed his four-year rookie contract, worth $32.9 million, on June 29, 2021.

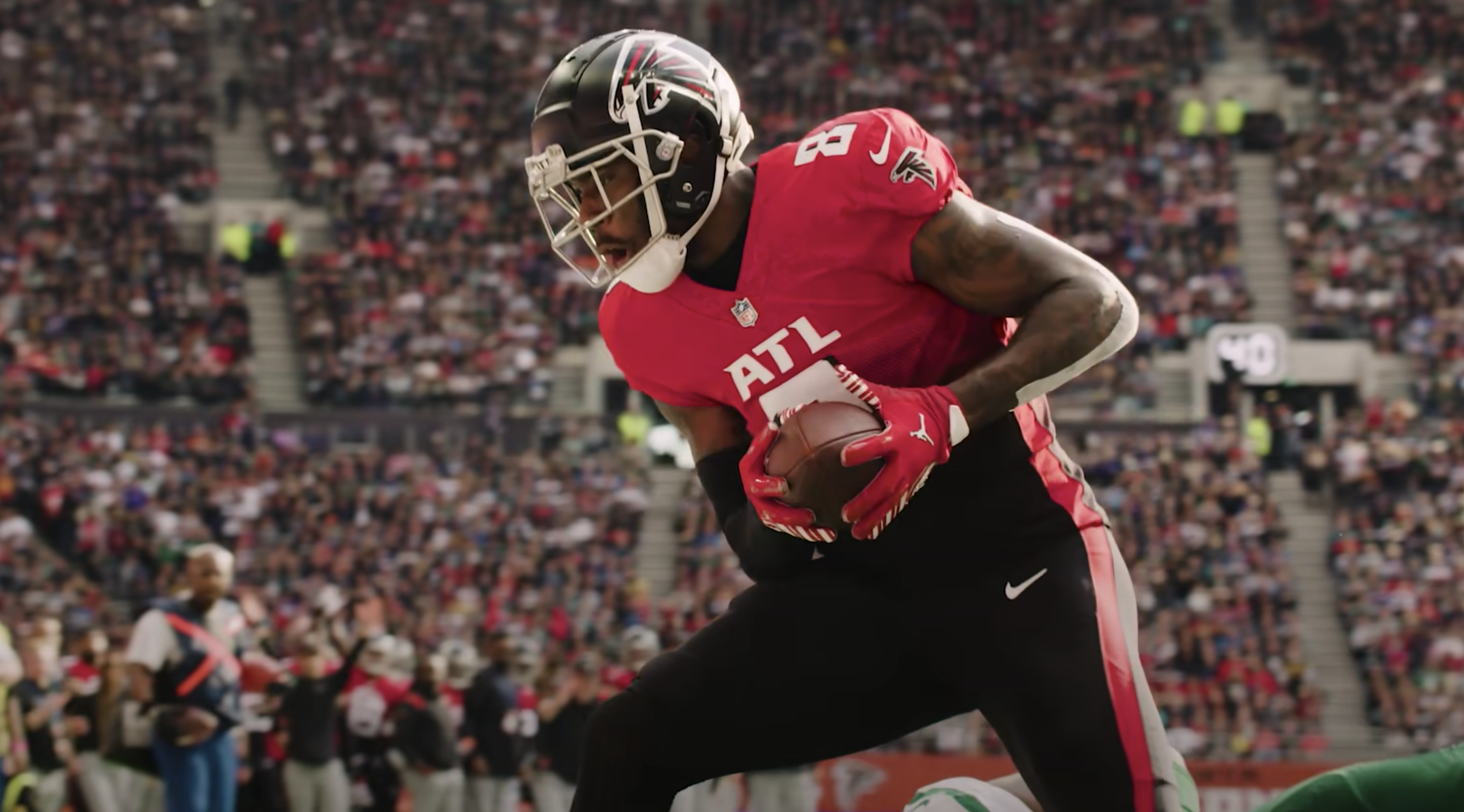
Pitts scores his first career touchdown against the New York Jets in his rookie season.

In his NFL debut, Pitts had four receptions for 31 yards in a 6–32 loss to the Philadelphia Eagles in Week 1. In Week 2, Pitts had five catches for 79 yards in a 25–48 loss to the Tampa Bay Buccaneers. In Week 5 against the New York Jets at Tottenham Hotspur Stadium, Pitts caught nine passes for 119 yards and his first NFL touchdown in the 27–20 win. In Week 7 against the Miami Dolphins, Pitts finished with 163 receiving yards as the Falcons won 30–28. His 163 receiving yards set the Falcons franchise record for receiving yards in a single game by a tight end.

In Week 16 against the Detroit Lions, Pitts had six receptions for 102 yards in the 20–16 win. In that game, Pitts surpassed Tony Gonzalez for the Falcon franchise record for the most receiving yards in a single season by a tight end. In Week 17 against the Buffalo Bills, Pitts joined Hall of Famer Mike Ditka as the only rookie tight ends in NFL history to surpass 1,000 receiving yards.

Pitts finished the season with 68 receptions for 1,026 yards and a touchdown. He was named to the 2022 Pro Bowl, making him the first rookie at his position to make the Pro Bowl since Jeremy Shockey in 2002. He was named to the 2021 PFWA All-Rookie Team. He was ranked 91st by his fellow players on the NFL Top 100 Players of 2022.

=== 2022 season ===
In Week 3 against the Seattle Seahawks, Pitts had five receptions for 87 yards in the 27–23 win. Pitts was ruled out with a hamstring injury for Week 5 against the Buccaneers. Pitts returned from injury in Week 6 against the San Francisco 49ers and had his first touchdown of the season. In Week 10 against the Carolina Panthers, Pitts had 5 receptions for 80 yards and a touchdown in the 37–34 overtime win. In Week 11 against the Chicago Bears, Pitts suffered a knee injury in the second half. He was placed on injured reserve the following day for a torn MCL. On November 30, 2022, Pitts was ruled out for the remainder of the season after having surgery to repair the MCL in his right knee.

Pitts finished the season with 28 receptions for 356 yards and two touchdowns.

=== 2023 season ===
In the 2023 season, Pitts had 53 receptions for 667 yards and three touchdowns.

=== 2024 season ===
On April 29, 2024, the Falcons picked up the fifth-year option on Pitts' contract. In the 2024 season, Pitts had 47 receptions for 602 yards and four touchdowns.

=== 2025 season ===
In a 29-28 win against the Tampa Bay Buccaneers in Week 15, Pitts had a career-high 11 receptions for 166 yards and three touchdowns and was named NFC Offensive Player of the Week. He became the first tight end to have at least 150 receiving yards and three touchdowns in a game since Hall of Famer Shannon Sharpe did in 1996. He finished the 2025 season with 88 receptions for 928 yards and five touchdowns. He earned a second-team selection on the 2025 All-Pro Team.

=== 2026 season ===
On February 24, 2026, the Falcons placed the franchise tag on Pitts. Despite failing to reach an agreement on a long-term deal, Pitts signed the tag on April 7. On June 23, Pitts and the Falcons agreed to a three-year, $54 million contract, with $36 million fully guaranteed.

== Career statistics ==
=== NFL ===
Legend
| **Bold** | Career best |

| Year | Team | Games | | Receiving | | | | | Rushing | | | | | Fumbles | |
| Year | Team | GP | GS | Rec | Yds | Y/R | Lng | TD | Att | Yds | Y/A | Lng | TD | Fum | Lost |
|---|---|---|---|---|---|---|---|---|---|---|---|---|---|---|---|
| 2021 | ATL | 17 | 15 | 68 | **1,026** | **15.1** | **61** | 1 | 0 | 0 | — | 0 | 0 | 0 | 0 |
| 2022 | ATL | 10 | 10 | 28 | 356 | 12.7 | 33 | 2 | 0 | 0 | — | 0 | 0 | 0 | 0 |
| 2023 | ATL | 17 | 15 | 53 | 667 | 12.6 | 39 | 3 | 1 | −4 | −4.0 | −4 | 0 | 0 | 0 |
| 2024 | ATL | 17 | 15 | 47 | 602 | 12.8 | 52 | 4 | 0 | 0 | — | 0 | 0 | 0 | 0 |
| 2025 | ATL | 17 | 17 | **88** | 928 | 10.5 | 36 | **5** | 0 | 0 | — | 0 | 0 | 0 | 0 |
| 2026 | ATL | 7 | 6 | 20 | 191 | 9.6 | 29 | 4 | 0 | 0 | — | 0 | 0 | 0 | 0 |
| Career | | 85 | 78 | 304 | 3,770 | 12.4 | 61 | 19 | 1 | −4 | −4.0 | −4 | 0 | 0 | 0 |

=== College ===
| Season | Team | GP | Receiving | | | |
| Season | Team | GP | Rec | Yds | Avg | TD |
|---|---|---|---|---|---|---|
| 2018 | Florida | 11 | 3 | 73 | **24.3** | 1 |
| 2019 | Florida | 13 | **54** | 649 | 12.0 | 5 |
| 2020 | Florida | 8 | 43 | **770** | 17.9 | **12** |
| Total | | 32 | 100 | 1,492 | 14.9 | 18 |

== Personal life ==
Pitts has a son named Kyle Pitts Jr., who was born on November 10, 2023.
