= Ta'Quon Graham =

American football player (born 1998)

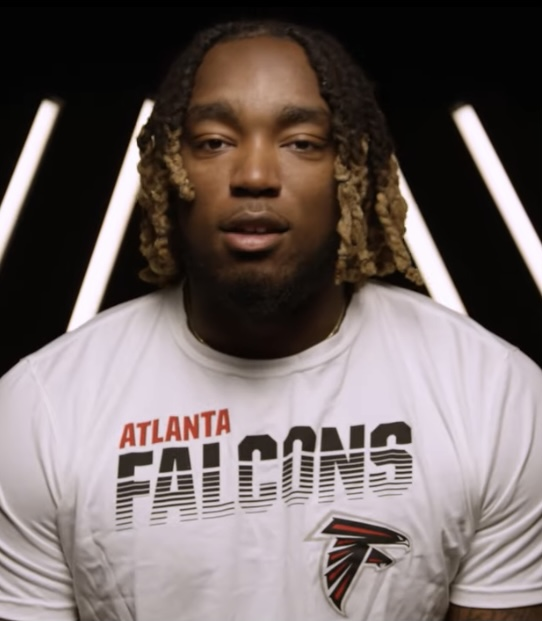
- Graham with the Atlanta Falcons in 2021

Profile
- Position: Defensive end

Personal information
- Born: December 1, 1998 (age 27); Killeen, Texas, U.S.
- Listed height: 6 ft 4 in (1.93 m)
- Listed weight: 294 lb (133 kg)

Career information
- High school: Temple (Temple, Texas)
- College: Texas (2017–2020)
- NFL draft: 2021: 5th round, 148th overall pick

Career history
- Atlanta Falcons (2021–2025); Philadelphia Eagles (2025–2026)*
- * Offseason or practice squad member only

Career NFL statistics as of 2024
- Total tackles: 84
- Sacks: 1
- Forced fumbles: 1
- Fumble recoveries: 1
- Stats at Pro Football Reference

Ta'Quon Graham (born December 1, 1998) is an American professional football defensive end. He played college football for the Texas Longhorns. He was selected by the Atlanta Falcons in the fifth round of the 2021 NFL draft.

== Professional career ==
Pre-draft measurables
Height	Weight	Arm length	Hand span	Wingspan	40-yard dash	10-yard split	20-yard split	20-yard shuttle	Three-cone drill	Vertical jump	Broad jump	Bench press
6 ft 3 1/8 in (1.91 m)	292 lb (132 kg)	35 in (0.89 m)	10 3/4 in (0.27 m)	7 ft 1 1/8 in (2.16 m)	4.88 s	1.67 s	2.73 s	4.68 s	7.31 s	32.5 in (0.83 m)	9 ft 5 in (2.87 m)	32 reps
All values from Pro Day

=== Atlanta Falcons ===
Graham was selected by the Atlanta Falcons in the fifth round, 148th overall, of the 2021 NFL draft. He signed his four-year rookie contract with Atlanta on June 15, 2021.

In 2021, he played in 13 games and started 5 and was inactive for 4 games. He had 15 tackles, 2 TFLs and 2 QB hits while playing about 1/3 of defensive downs for Atlanta.

In 2022, he was a larger part of the defense and played in 11 games and started 9 before he was placed on injured reserve on November 21 with a knee injury and missing the rest of the season. He recorded career high numbers of 34 tackles, 8 QB Hits and a fumble and fumble recovery for 19 yards; as well as TFL.

In 2023, he played in 15 games, was inactive for 2 and started 2. He forced his 1st career fumble and recorded his first sack, while also recording 23 tackles, a TFL and QB hit.

In 2024, he again has his season shortened, this time by an injured pectoral muscle. Prior to that he had 12 tackles and a QB hit in 10 games with no starts.

On March 17, 2025, Graham re-signed with the Falcons. He was placed on injured reserve to begin the year due to an undisclosed injury. Graham was activated on October 18, ahead of the team's Week 7 matchup against the San Francisco 49ers. He was released on November 5.

=== Philadelphia Eagles ===
On November 8, 2025, Graham was signed to the Philadelphia Eagles' practice squad.

On March 2, 2026, Graham re-signed with the Eagles. He was released by Philadelphia on August 2.
