= History of the Arizona Cardinals =

History of an American football team

Home locations of the Cardinals franchise throughout their history
*Team played in Pittsburgh as part of a temporary merger with the Pittsburgh Steelers known as Card-Pitt.

This article details the history of the Arizona Cardinals American football club, which can be traced to the 1898 formation of the amateur Morgan Athletic Club in Chicago. The Cardinals are the oldest extant professional football club in the United States, and along with the Chicago Bears, are one of two charter members of the National Football League still in existence. The franchise moved from Chicago to St. Louis in 1960 and to Phoenix, Arizona, in 1988.

== Arizona years (1988–present) ==
=== Early years (1988–1993) ===
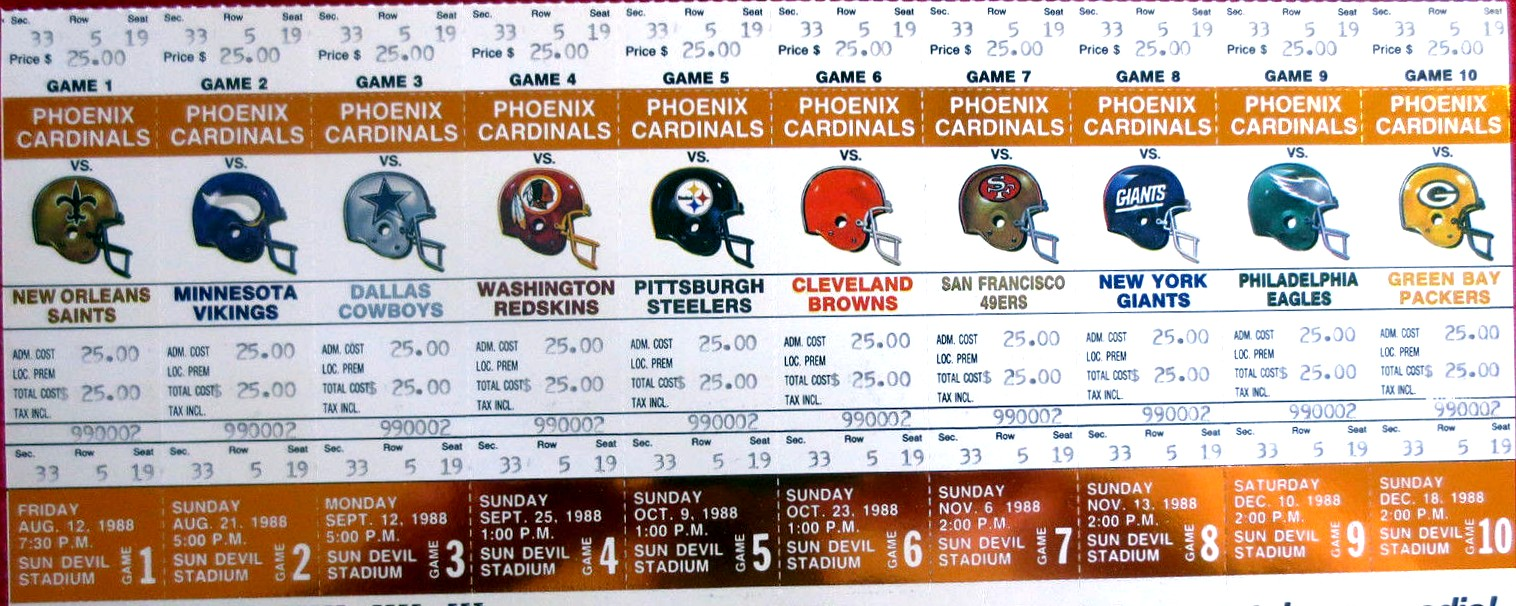
Season tickets for the Cardinals' 1988 inaugural season in Arizona

On January 15, 1988, Bill Bidwill announced his intention to move to Arizona. On March 15, 1988, the NFL team owners voted to allow Bidwill to move the Cardinals from St. Louis to Phoenix for the 1988 NFL season. The team became the Phoenix Cardinals. They planned to play at Arizona State University's Sun Devil Stadium in Tempe temporarily, while a new stadium was being built. But the savings and loan crisis derailed financing for the stadium, and the Cardinals played at Arizona State for 18 years.

The Cardinals had missed the playoffs by a single game in their final season in St. Louis, and for much of the 1988 season they were poised to make the playoffs. At the end of week 11, they were 7–4 and in first place in the NFC East. However, they dropped their final five games to finish 7–9.

==== Bottom of the East ====
The team got off to another strong start in 1989, with road victories over the Detroit Lions and Seattle Seahawks, then suffered a rash of injuries. With five games to go in the season, Gene Stallings, who had followed the team from St. Louis, announced his plans to retire at the end of the season. But general manager Larry Wilson ordered Stallings to leave immediately, and named running backs coach Hank Kuhlmann as interim coach. The team lost its last five games to finish 5–11 – the first of four straight 11-loss seasons.

Joe Bugel, the architect of the Redskins' famous "Hogs" offensive line in the 1980s, coached the Cardinals from 1990 to 1993, usually finishing last in the dominant NFC East, which produced the Super Bowl winner in each of those seasons (Giants in 1990, Redskins in 1991, and the Cowboys in 1992–1993). Bugel's first three teams finished 5–11 in 1990 and 4–12 in both 1991 and 1992 before improving to 7–9 in 1993. During the 1993 season, the Cardinals outscored their opponents by 57 points, but suffered eight losses by seven points or less, five of those setbacks coming to playoff teams. A three-game winning streak to close the season, including a 17–6 triumph over the playoff-bound Giants, was not enough to save Bugel's job.

=== Adopting Arizona and first playoff push (1994–1998) ===
In March 1994, Bill Bidwill bowed to fan preference and renamed the team the Arizona Cardinals. Bidwill had rebuffed earlier entreaties, citing the NFL's tradition of team names that identified home cities – even though the Cardinals did not actually play in Phoenix, and that the Minnesota Vikings and New England Patriots were longstanding exceptions (also, the Carolina Panthers were set to start play the following year). The rest of the NFL owners quickly approved the name change.

==== Buddy Ryan years ====
Buddy Ryan replaced Bugel in 1994, also serving as his own general manager. With typical bluster, he declared, "You've got a winner in town." He guaranteed victory in the 1994 week 3 game at the Cleveland Browns, which Cleveland subsequently won, 32–0. The Cardinals, who ranked third in the NFL in total defense in 1994 but suffered from a lack of consistency at quarterback, entered the final week of the season with an outside chance at a playoff berth, but a 10–6 loss to the Atlanta Falcons ended those hopes as Arizona finished 8–8.

The 1995 season saw the Cardinals drop to 4–12, including an embarrassing 27–7 loss to the expansion Carolina Panthers. Ryan was fired on December 26, less than 24 hours after the Cardinals lost 37–13 on Christmas Day to the Cowboys on Monday Night Football. Dallas returned to Sun Devil Stadium 34 days later and defeated the Pittsburgh Steelers in Super Bowl XXX, the first time both Arizona and a home field of the Cardinals franchise hosted the event.

==== Vince Tobin years ====
===== Building a playoff team (1996–1997) =====
Ryan was followed by Vince Tobin, who improved the Cardinals to 7–9 in 1996, led by defensive end Simeon Rice, the third overall pick who became the NFL Defensive Rookie of the Year, and a rejuvenated Boomer Esiason at quarterback. Esiason threw for 522 yards in an overtime victory over the Washington Redskins in the Cardinals' final game at RFK Stadium, and two weeks later led a fourth-quarter comeback against the playoff-bound Philadelphia Eagles. The 1996 season also featured a lowlight: a 31–21 loss at home to the New York Jets, the only game the Jets won during a 1–15 season.

The Cardinals fell back to 4–12 in 1997, but that season saw the debut of rookie quarterback Jake Plummer, who the previous season guided Arizona State to a remarkable 11–0 regular season before falling just short of the national championship with a loss to Ohio State in the Rose Bowl. The highlight of the 1997 season was a 25–22 overtime victory over the Dallas Cowboys in week 2, ending Dallas' 13-game winning streak over the Cardinals which dated back to 1990. But the team lost the next two games, falling to the Washington Redskins 19–13 in overtime in the first-ever game at Jack Kent Cooke Stadium, and then 18–17 to the playoff-bound Tampa Bay Buccaneers.

===== First playoff year (1998) =====
During the 1998 season, Jake Plummer enjoyed his greatest stretch of success during his tenure with the franchise, in terms of victories at least, as his quarterback rating was still an average 75.0. The team during that time had once again been dubbed the Cardiac Cards by the local and national media as eight of their 16 regular-season games were decided by three points or less, and seven of those games ended in favor of the Cardinals. Solidifying their status as the team to beat in the clutch, the Cardinals, sporting a 6–7 record going into the 15th week, defeated the Philadelphia Eagles in overtime on a field goal by Chris Jacke, then returned home to defeat the New Orleans Saints by two and the San Diego Chargers by three to clinch a wild-card playoff berth.

The close calls and the fact that none of their victories had been to teams with winning records (New Orleans was the best of the group at 6–10; San Diego was 5–11 and Philadelphia 3–13) made them heavy underdogs going into their Wild Card Playoff game against the Dallas Cowboys. Considering their two regular season losses to the Cowboys and the fact that they had been on the losing end of 16 of the last 17 games against their division rivals, including 9 straight losses at Texas Stadium, the "Team of the Nineties" seemed to have history and ample statistical evidence on their side. To further the situation, the Cardinals franchise had not won a single playoff game since their title year of 1947, resulting in the longest active drought in professional sports history.

However, Arizona dominated the Cowboys on both ends of the football throughout the game. At Texas Stadium that afternoon, the Cardinals jumped out to a 10–0 halftime lead. The Cardinals would later increase that lead to 20–0 in the final minutes of the 4th quarter. The Cowboys' only score was a touchdown late in the 4th quarter, and the Cardinals held on for a 20–7 upset that wasn't even that close. The Cardinals, who had suffered for 51 years as the NFL's doormat (and having never won or hosted any playoff games during their tenure in St. Louis), finally had a playoff win. However, any celebration was short lived as the Cardinals fell in the divisional round of the playoffs to the Minnesota Vikings who possessed a 15–1 record as well as the highest scoring offense in NFL history at the time. The Vikings won the game 41–21 in the Hubert H. Humphrey Metrodome in downtown Minneapolis.

=== Regressing to the basement (1999–2006) ===
The Cardinals did not win more than seven games in any season between 1999 and 2006, and had one of the worst yearly attendance records in the NFL. Sun Devil Stadium gained a reputation for being one of the quietest stadiums in the NFL during the Cardinals' tenure there (which stood in decided contrast to Sun Devil home games). The few fans who did show up for games were most often rooting for the away team, creating "home games" on the road for many opposing teams—a phenomenon most noticeable when teams with great national followings, such as the Packers, Bears, 49ers, Raiders, Redskins, Steelers and Cowboys, came into town. A significant percentage of the state's residents only live there during the winter and live elsewhere for the rest of the year, and many of Arizona's permanent residents either grew up in other states or have roots outside the state.

==== End of Tobin's tenure ====
Coming off their playoff run in 1998, the Cardinals were expected to do bigger and better things in 1999, but a tough schedule ranked in the top 5 as well as key injuries returned the team to their losing ways, getting off to a 2–6 start. However, the Cardinals would make another run, winning 4 straight games to get back into the playoff chase, but it was not meant to be; Arizona lost their last 4 games to finish with a disappointing 6–10 record.

The next season had a worrisome preview with a 1–3 record in the preseason preceding a 2–5 start by Arizona. After a 48–7 blowout loss to a team they had previously beaten, a 2–4 Cowboys team led by new head coach Dave Campo, Bidwell fired Tobin, the coach who had won the Cardinals their first playoff game since 1947, ending his head coaching career with a 28–43 record. The coaching change did not improve the team's record, instead leading to it plummeting to a franchise low 3–13. Two of their wins were by only one point, and the team had a franchise worst minus-233 point differential. The team also posted a negative-24 turnover differential, one of the worst in NFL history.

==== Return to the bottom of the East ====
Tobin was fired during the 2000 season and replaced by existing defensive coordinator Dave McGinnis, who remained head coach until his firing in 2003; McGinnis compiled a win–loss record of 17–40 during his tenure. In McGinnis' second game as head coach, Aeneas Williams tied an NFL record by returning a fumble 104 yards for a touchdown in a 16–15 victory over the Redskins. This would be his only win that season. Other notable victories during McGinnis' tenure included a 34–31 overtime victory over the Oakland Raiders in 2001 in the Cardinals' first-ever visit to Oakland, and an 18–17 triumph in the final game of the 2003 season over the Minnesota Vikings, in which Josh McCown threw the game-winning touchdown pass to Nate Poole with no time left on the clock, eliminating the Vikings from the playoffs.

==== Bottom of the West ====
In 2002, the addition of the Houston Texans caused the NFL to realign into eight divisions of four teams each. After 32 years of being in the NFC East, and having been located in an Eastern conference or division since the NFL began conference play in 1933, the Cardinals were finally moved to the NFC West with the 49ers, Seahawks, and Rams, which made far more sense from a geographical standpoint. This also gave new life to the Cardinals-Rams rivalry, one of the oldest matchups in NFL history, with the added dimension that the Rams had moved to St. Louis and built the indoor arena Bidwell had been denied while the Cardinals still played on a collegiate field.

In 2004, the Cardinals hired former Vikings coach Dennis Green as their head coach. Prior to his signing with the Cardinals, he compiled a 97–62 record in ten seasons with Minnesota (1992–2001), leading that franchise to four NFC Central Division titles and two NFC Championship games. The Cardinals continued their mediocre ways, going 6–10 in 2004 and 5–11 in 2005, the final two seasons for the team in Sun Devil Stadium.

In early 2005, Cardinals signed Kurt Warner to a one-year, $4 million contract and later extending it to six years. Warner would retire on January 29, 2010. Matt Leinart was drafted tenth overall in the 2006 NFL draft. After four seasons, Leinart was released on September 4, 2010, and signed a one-year contract with the Houston Texans two days later.

==== Pat Tillman ====
As an All-American safety at Arizona State, the Cardinals were able to get a good look at Pat Tillman before drafting him late in the 1998 NFL draft. By week two of his rookie season, Tillman found a starting roster spot and endeared himself to the Arizona fanbase. Tillman left professional football following the 2001 season to serve in the military in the wake of the September 11 terrorist attacks. Tragedy struck the team on April 22, 2004, when former safety Pat Tillman, a popular player who was an All-American at Arizona State, was killed in Afghanistan while serving in the United States Army. Tillman became the first NFL player to lose his life in war since Buffalo Bills offensive tackle Bob Kalsu died in 1970 during the Vietnam War. Tillman's jersey number 40 was retired at the Cardinals' first home game of 2004.

==== A new stadium, but the same team (2006) ====
In 2000, Maricopa County voters passed a ballot initiative by a margin of 51% to 49%, providing funding for a new Cardinals stadium (as well as for improvements to Major League Baseball spring training facilities in the greater Phoenix region; and youth recreation). After some legal obstacles, the Cardinals began construction of their new facility in April 2003, in Glendale, one of the western suburbs of Phoenix. State Farm Stadium features a retractable roof and a slide-out grass surface, which is good for the hot desert weather; the new stadium has a state-of-the-art air conditioning system and high-back seats. The facility has been hailed as a modern marvel and is a frequent host of major events including three Super Bowls, the annual Fiesta Bowl, NCAA championship games, international soccer matches, Wrestlemania as well as concerts, graduations and more. The Cardinals' executive offices and training facility remained in Tempe, in a complex (built in 1990) about 8 miles (13 km) south of Sun Devil Stadium.

Initially simply called Cardinals Stadium, the 63,500-seat venue (expandable to 72,800) opened on August 12, 2006, when the Cardinals defeated the Pittsburgh Steelers, 21–13, in a preseason game. The Cardinals then hosted their first regular season opening day game since moving to the Phoenix area in 1988, defeating the San Francisco 49ers in a rematch of the 2005 blowout in Mexico City, 34–27, in front of a sellout crowd of 63,407. Later that year, the stadium's naming rights were acquired by a local private-for-profit university, and for the next 12 years it was called University of Phoenix Stadium. As a new, deluxe facility, it was selected to host Super Bowl XLII.

For some time, many team officials blamed Sun Devil Stadium for the Cardinals' woes. Being merely a tenant in a college-owned stadium, especially considering that it was never intended as a full-time home, denied the Cardinals access to many revenue streams that other NFL teams took for granted.

Despite the new stadium, the team began the 2006 season with a 1–8 record, punctuated by a 24–23 loss to the Chicago Bears on October 16 (before a sellout crowd enjoying a rare Cardinals appearance on Monday Night Football) in which Arizona blew a 20-point lead in an extremely bizarre game as Chicago scored no offensive touchdowns and the Cardinals led in several statistical categories including Time of Possession, Passing Yardage, Rushing Yardage, Giveaways, Takeaways, and Interceptions. Despite all the overwhelming statistical evidence the Bears capitalized on the two turnovers the Cardinals did commit, a pair of fumbles, and promptly returned them both for touchdowns. They also converted a punt return into a touchdown. The Cardinals had a chance to redeem themselves with a last minute field goal which would give them the victory, but their offense turned conservative and stalled just past midfield, and a 40-yard field goal attempt by Neil Rackers missed wide left. Afterwards Green fired off an uncharacteristic, angry tirade in the postgame press conference, stating "The Bears are who we thought they were", adding "If you want to crown them, then crown their ass! But they are who we thought they were, and we let 'em off the hook!"

Following the game against the Bears, Green fired his offensive coordinator, Keith Rowen; the game's final drive with the conservative play calling being the reason behind the firing. In the first game after the Monday Night debacle, the Cardinals were dominated in a 22–9 loss to the previously winless Raiders, one of only two games Oakland won in 2006.

=== A moment in the sun - Warner's comeback (2007–2009) ===
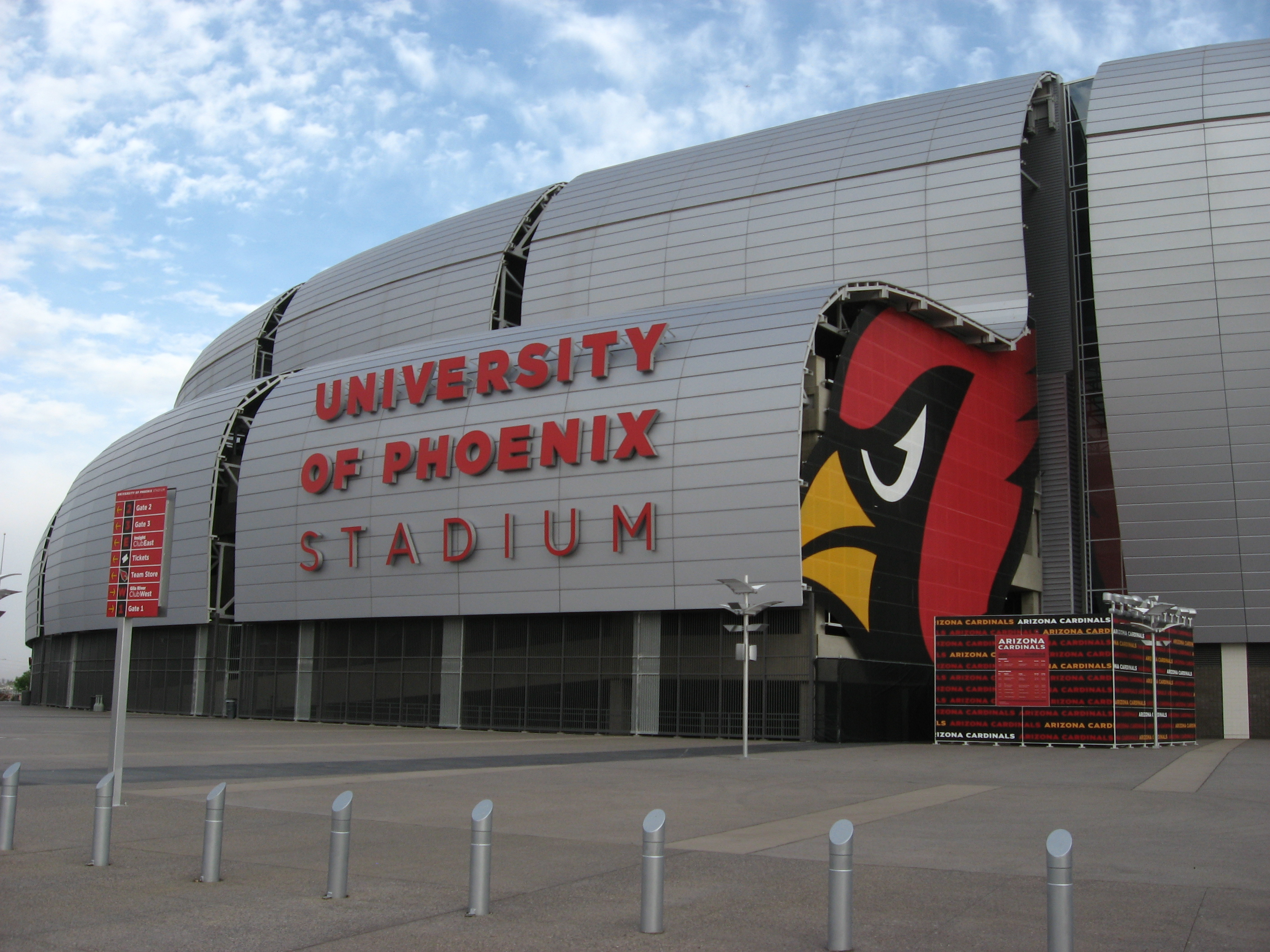
State Farm Stadium (then known as University of Phoenix Stadium), the current home of the Arizona Cardinals

On January 1, 2007, after a 5–11 season and a 3-year record of 16–32, the Cardinals announced the firing of Green. After a brief period of speculation, Pittsburgh Steelers offensive coordinator Ken Whisenhunt was named the Cardinals head coach for the 2007 season.

In the first round of the 2007 NFL draft, the Cardinals selected offensive tackle Levi Brown from Penn State with the fifth overall pick. The Cardinals selected cornerback Dominique Rodgers-Cromartie with their first pick in the 2008 NFL draft.

The Cardinals finished 2007 with an 8–8 record, just their third non-losing record since moving to Arizona. Matt Leinart had started the first five games, but Kurt Warner had replaced him in three of those and started the other 11, posting a 7–7 record in games he finished. This practically put an end to the Cardinals' reliance on their former top ten pick as Leinart would ultimately only get two more starts in his NFL career, just one for Arizona. The former Super Bowl MVP Warner had begun his career resurgence which would solidify his case for Canton and take the Cardinals soaring to new heights.

==== Reaching the Super Bowl (2008) ====
The Cardinals began the 2008 season by splitting their first four games, including a 56–35 loss to the New York Jets in which Jets quarterback Brett Favre threw six touchdown passes, and Arizona receiver Anquan Boldin suffered a fractured sinus and concussion following a helmet-to-helmet hit by Jets cornerback Eric Smith. Arizona recovered to win five of its next six games to improve to 7–3, but lost two games in a five-day stretch of late November to the New York Giants and Philadelphia Eagles (the latter on Thanksgiving Day). On December 7, the Cardinals clinched the NFC West Division championship with a 34–10 victory at home over the St. Louis Rams to ensure the club's first playoff berth since 1998, as well as their first division title since 1975. It assured the Cardinals of hosting at least one playoff game at home—only the second home playoff game in franchise history, the first since the icy 1947 NFL Championship Game. Curiously, they never played a home playoff game while in St. Louis despite winning two division titles. In another ironic twist, St. Louis first hosted a playoff game in 2000 en route to the Rams' Super Bowl XXXIV victory quarterbacked by Kurt Warner, the Cardinal QB who had just led them to victory over those St. Louis Rams.

Two lackluster performances followed the Cardinals clinching the division title, losing at home 35–14 to the Minnesota Vikings, then suffering a 47–7 rout to the New England Patriots at a snowy Gillette Stadium. The Cardinals then defeated the Seattle Seahawks at home to clinch their first winning season since 1998, and thus avoided becoming the third team to win a division title with an 8–8 record (after the 1985 Cleveland Browns and 2008 San Diego Chargers).

On January 3, 2009, the Cardinals won their first home playoff game in 61 years by defeating the Atlanta Falcons 30–24 in the wild-card round. They then upset the Carolina Panthers 33–13 in Charlotte in the Divisional Playoffs. With the Philadelphia Eagles upsetting the top-seeded New York Giants the next day, the Cardinals, as the only remaining division champion, earned the right to host the first NFC Championship Game in team history. On January 18, 2009, the Cardinals defeated the Eagles 32–25 to advance to the Super Bowl for the first time in franchise history. They lost Super Bowl XLIII 27–23 to the Pittsburgh Steelers.

==== Title defense (2009) ====
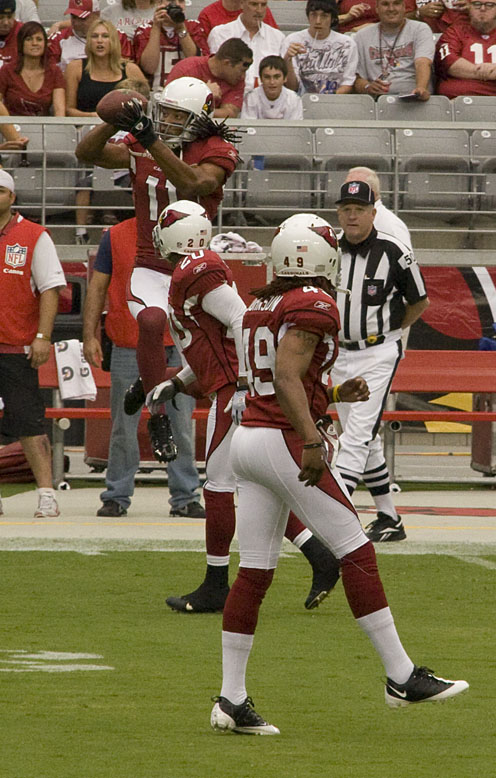
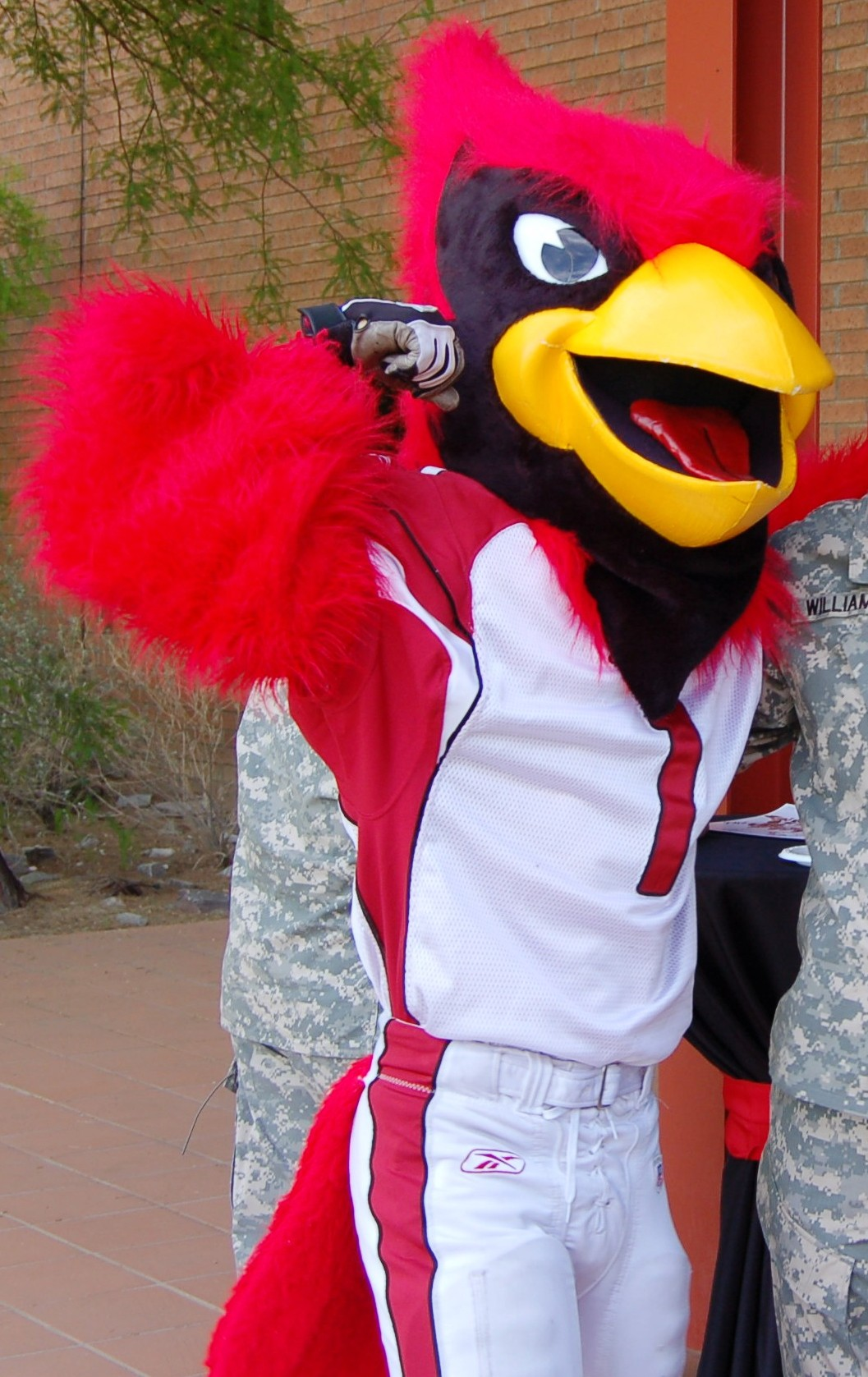
(Left): Wide receiver Larry Fitzgerald (11) and some other Cardinals in 2009; (right): Big Red, the Cardinals team mascot, at the team's headquarters in 2009

The 2009 Cardinals season started off with high expectations from fans following the team's improbable run to the Super Bowl the previous year. The Cardinals drafted Chris "Beanie" Wells with the 31st pick in the 2009 NFL draft to help improve their lack of a running game with the loss of Edgerrin James. But, with the Cardinals losing their offensive coordinator, Todd Haley, to the Kansas City Chiefs and having contract disputes with certain players, many outsiders thought the Cardinals would not return to the playoffs. The Cardinals started the season with a frustrating loss to their division rival, the San Francisco 49ers. They regrouped by beating Jacksonville, but followed that with another embarrassing loss at home to the Indianapolis Colts. They quickly recovered after their bye-week, winning 6 of their next 7 games. While playing the Rams in Week 11, Kurt Warner sustained a concussion and sat out the game against Tennessee the following week. Matt Leinart took his place as starter in a 20–17 loss. After Warner returned, the Cardinals hosted Minnesota and inflicted a sensational 30–17 defeat on them. After that, they fell again to San Francisco 24–9 on Monday Night.

Coupled with a win over the Detroit Lions and loss from San Francisco to the Philadelphia Eagles, the Cardinals clinched their second straight NFC West division title on December 20, 2009.

The Cardinals finished the season 10–6, which was the team's best record since moving to Arizona. In the final game of the year, they were blown out by the Green Bay Packers, 33–7. The game was meaningless to both teams in terms of playoff positioning. With a Minnesota victory just shortly before the start the Cardinals and Packers game, the Cardinals learned that they would be playing the same Packers team the following week in a NFC Wild Card game at home. Both teams took a different strategy to the game. The Packers decided to play their starters through three quarters, while the Cardinals played most of their starters for only a few plays.

With injuries being a factor the Cardinals started the NFC Wild Card game as a 2.5 point underdog at home on January 10, 2010. The Cardinals ended up beating the Green Bay Packers 51–45 in overtime in the highest scoring playoff game in NFL history, keeping alive the Packers–Cardinals rivalry which began on November 20, 1921, when the two teams played to a 3–3 tie. For the game, Kurt Warner had 5 touchdown passes and only 4 incomplete passes, going 29 for 33. With the playoff victory, the Cardinals earned the right to play the New Orleans Saints in the divisional playoff game on January 16, 2010.

The Packers game exposed Arizona's weak defense however, and they were out-gunned by the Saints during the Divisional playoff game, losing by a lop-sided score of 45–14. Kurt Warner went 17–26 for 205 yards passing, but failed to throw for any touchdowns. The Cardinals went 1–8 on 3rd down conversions. Warner was knocked out of the game in the second quarter when he threw an interception that was caught by Saints defensive end Will Smith. A few days after the game, Kurt Warner announced his retirement from the NFL. This took the team by surprise, as they had expected him to play for the last year of his contract.

=== Sustained success (2010–2017) ===
The coaching tenures of Whisenhunt and his successor, Bruce Arians, saw the Cardinals turn a corner from perennial loser to a team capable of contention. In the span of eight years, Arizona won the NFC West thrice after winning only four such titles in the previous 75 years. After posting the franchise's best season in 2015, the team could boast a record of 86–73–1 over the previous decade. This equates to a winning percentage of 54%, the highest in franchise history since 1931, a far cry from the 34% in the decade before Whisenhunt's hiring. In over a century of operation in the NFL, these two coaches are atop the wins column amongst all coaches for the team.

==== Struggling to succeed Warner ====
Several quarterback options were floated for 2011, including veteran Donovan McNabb (a part-time resident of Chandler, a local suburb) and Carson Palmer (who Kurt Warner personally lobbied for). In the end, the Cardinals got Eagles backup quarterback Kevin Kolb in exchange for trading cornerback Dominique Rodgers-Cromartie. They beat the Carolina Panthers in Week 1 for Kolb's first regular season game on the team, but lost the next three against the Washington Redskins, Seattle Seahawks, and New York Giants despite close scores. In Week 5, they headed to face the Minnesota Vikings seeking their first win in Minnesota since 1977, but came up short. After their bye week, the Cardinals traveled to face the talented Baltimore Ravens. Despite having a 21–6 lead at halftime, a poor performance in the second half led to 27–30 loss. During the game, quarterback Kevin Kolb injured his toe leading to an extended absence.

Week 9, the second year and second-string quarterback John Skelton came off the bench to start against the St. Louis Rams. Due to Kolb's lackluster performances in the games leading up to his injury, many fans and commentators suggested that if Skelton played well enough, the starting job might end up his, and that Kolb would be benched. Skelton gave an average performance, throwing for 222 yards, but it, coupled with an effective defense, gave the Cardinals the win. At the end of regulation, defensive tackle Calais Campbell blocked the would-be game-winning field goal attempt by the Rams, forcing overtime. After one drive, the Rams were forced to punt. Rookie cornerback Patrick Peterson fielded the punt from the Arizona 1-yard line and returned the punt 99 yards for a game winning score, and also setting the record for longest punt return for a touchdown in NFL history. The Cardinals would win this game, 19–13 in overtime.

In Week 10, Kolb was still not ready to return, so John Skelton would start again, with the team traveling to Philadelphia to take on the Philadelphia Eagles. Historically, the Cardinals had struggled when playing on the east coast, but they made short work of the Eagles, winning 21–17, with Skelton throwing for 315 yards, including 146 yards and 2 touchdowns to Larry Fitzgerald.

The two wins with Skelton gave way to the suggestion by fans and commentators that Skelton may end up the permanent starter. But after an abysmal week 11 performance against the San Francisco 49ers that resulted in a 23–7 loss, the discussion stopped and fans eagerly awaited the return of Kolb.

Kolb was still not ready to start in week 12 when the team traveled to St. Louis to again face the St. Louis Rams. Skelton gave a mediocre performance, throwing for just 112 yards with 2 interceptions. But running back Chris "Beanie" Wells made up for the weak passing game by running for a career-high 228 yards. It was during this game that cornerback Patrick Peterson returned another punt for a touchdown, for a total of 4 on the season, tying the NFL record. The Cardinals would win 23–20.

Week 13 saw the return of Kevin Kolb as the starter against the Dallas Cowboys. After a slow first half for the Cardinals, the score at halftime was a 10–0 Cowboys lead. The Cardinals defense played well, holding the Cowboys to just 10 first half points. In the second half, the offense got going, and Kolb went on to throw for 247 yards. At the end of regulation, the Cowboys were on offense, and poor clock management led to a 49-yard field goal attempt for the win. Cowboys head coach Jason Garrett called a time-out as the kicker was lining up to kick, and essentially "iced" his own kicker. After the time-out, the Cowboys lined up to kick again, and this time, the kick was short, leading to overtime. The Cardinals received the ball first, and moved down the field rapidly, with a 52-yard pass to LaRod Stephens-Howling which resulted in a touchdown, giving the Cardinals the overtime win.

The next week in a divisional game against the San Francisco 49ers, on just the third play of the game, Kolb was inadvertently kicked in the head and suffered a concussion. The concussion eventually caused Kolb to miss the rest of the season. Skelton came in and pulled off the upset over the 10–2 49ers. Skelton would go on and start the remainder of the season. Despite the Cardinals starting the season 1–6, they won 7 of their last nine to finish 8–8, including four overtime wins, an NFL record for most overtime wins in a single season. The Cardinals sent three players to the 2012 Pro Bowl: wide receiver and team icon Larry Fitzgerald, rookie cornerback and punt returner Patrick Peterson, and safety Adrian Wilson.

After Skelton's strong finish to the 2011 season, head coach Ken Whisenhunt declared that Kolb and Skelton would compete for the starting quarterback position. Skelton would eventually win the battle and be named the opening-day starter. However, Skelton was injured near the end of the opening game against the Seahawks, which saw Kolb come in off the bench and lead a game-winning drive. Kolb would start the next week and pull off a surprising upset over the AFC champion Patriots in Foxborough. Kolb played well enough to stay the starting quarterback even after Skelton was healthy, but Kolb himself would become injured in a 19–16 overtime loss to the Buffalo Bills. Kolb suffered broken ribs and was expected to miss six to eight weeks, but would eventually be placed on injured reserve. The Cardinals started off a surprising 4–0, but would then lose nine straight games, including an embarrassing 58–0 loss to the Seahawks at CenturyLink Field. Skelton would eventually be replaced by rookie Ryan Lindley in a loss to the Atlanta Falcons, but was re-inserted as starter after Lindley's struggles.

==== Bruce Arians era (2013–2017) ====
On December 31, 2012, Whisenhunt was relieved of his head coaching duties by the Cardinals after 3 straight non-playoff seasons. Rod Graves, general manager at the time, was also relieved of his duties. On January 17, 2013, the Cardinals and Indianapolis Colts offensive coordinator (and temporary interim head coach) Bruce Arians agreed on a 4-year deal that would make him their head coach. Cardinals defensive coordinator Ray Horton was also a leading candidate for the head coach position; after Arians' hiring, Horton was hired as the defensive coordinator for the Cleveland Browns.

In the 2013 season, the Cardinals won 10 games, and were in playoff contention heading into the final Week 17. But the team missed the playoffs for a fourth consecutive year.

The next year, Arizona had an impressive start to the season, winning nine out of the first ten games. However, the team lost four of the next six games, finishing 2014 with an 11–5 record, setting the most wins in a regular season since 1975, when the Cardinals were based in St. Louis. The Cardinals clinched a playoff spot as a wild card, the #5 seed. They would play the #4 Carolina Panthers, who won the NFC South with a 7–8–1 record. Injuries to Carson Palmer involving an ACL tear against the St. Louis Rams on week 11 of the regular season which would end Palmer's year. Drew Stanton was also hurt by the Rams as well in week 16 of the 2014 season by taking a hit to the knee which soon became infected and forced the team to start third-string quarterback Ryan Lindley. Carolina became the second team with a sub-.500 record to win an NFL playoff game, defeating Arizona 27–16.

On July 27, 2015, the Arizona Cardinals hired Jennifer Welter as an assistant coaching intern for training camp and the preseason; as such, she is believed to be the first female coach in the NFL.

That season, Arizona set another record for number of wins in a season since moving to Arizona, this time with 13. They also clinched their first NFC West title since 2009, and a first-round bye in team history. The Cardinals defeated the Green Bay Packers 26–20 in overtime, giving quarterback Carson Palmer his first playoff victory. The Cardinals advanced to their second NFC Championship game in their history and faced the top-seeded Carolina Panthers. The Cardinals were blown out 49–15, with Arizona having seven turnovers, the most in any playoff game since the Packers' eight in 2001 against the St. Louis Rams.

After the team's results in 2015, the Cardinals were an expected Super Bowl contender in 2016. However, the team had a poor start, losing three of their first four games. The first tie for the franchise since 1986 occurred on an NBC Sunday Night Football game against the Seattle Seahawks on October 23. The score was 6–6, the lowest-scoring tie since overtime began in 1974. After a loss to the New Orleans Saints in Week 15, the Cardinals were eliminated from playoff contention. They finished the year at 7–8–1.

2017 was another hard year for the Cardinals. David Johnson and Carson Palmer suffered injuries early in the season. Midseason, former Minnesota Vikings running back Adrian Peterson was acquired from New Orleans, but was also shut down after a neck injury suffered late in the season. The Cardinals finished 8–8 without the playoffs. This season marked the end of the Bruce Arians era in Arizona as he retired following the season. Carson Palmer also retired the next day after 15 seasons.

=== Steve Wilks experiment (2018) ===
In January 2018, the Cardinals announced the hiring of Carolina Panthers defensive coordinator Steve Wilks as their new head coach, the second African-American (after Dennis Green) to hold the position. On July 4, general manager Steve Keim was arrested and later pleaded guilty to extreme DUI. The Cardinals suspended him for the first five weeks of the 2018 season and he was also fined $200,000.

At the beginning of the season, the Cardinals started quarterback Sam Bradford, whom they acquired during the off-season. After losing to the Washington Redskins in week 1 and getting shut out by the Los Angeles Rams a week later, the Cardinals were off to a very bad start. They were struggling offensively, with Sam Bradford not being able to do anything positive, and the comeback of running back David Johnson was nothing like it was hoped to be, as he was constantly shut down. Through two weeks, they had failed to put up a single offensive score. In week 3 they played the Chicago Bears, and after having a solid first quarter (that included two touchdown passes), the offense again got pummeled and Bradford only threw for 65 yards from that point on. Late in the fourth quarter however, Bradford was benched and replaced by rookie Josh Rosen, who was the Cardinals' first round pick in the 2018 NFL draft. Rosen went 4/7 on his throws, had 36 passing yards, and threw an interception. Rosen remained as the starting quarterback and Bradford was released by the Cardinals on November 1. After a blowout loss to the Denver Broncos in week 7, offensive coordinator Mike McCoy was fired and replaced by quarterbacks coach Byron Leftwich. They continued to struggle for the rest of the year and with two wins against the San Francisco 49ers and one against the Green Bay Packers, they finished the season with an abysmal 3–13 record, tying for the franchise's worst (with the 2000 Arizona Cardinals). It was also the league's worst in 2018, earning them the 1st overall pick in the upcoming 2019 NFL draft. After only one season as head coach, Steve Wilks was fired, thus ending the short-lived 'Wilks era'. Offensive coordinator Byron Leftwich and defensive coordinator Al Holcomb were also both fired, along with most of the coaching staff.

=== A franchise quarterback (2019–present) ===
With their first round pick (1st overall) in the 2019 NFL draft the Arizona Cardinals would draft quarterback Kyler Murray. With the drafting of Murray, the Cardinals would trade their first round pick from the previous year quarterback Josh Rosen to the Miami Dolphins in exchange for a 2019 second round pick and a 2019 fifth round pick.

==== Kliff Kingsbury years (2019–2022) ====
To use the first pick on a quarterback after having just drafted one early the year before was met with some criticism, but was not wholly unexpected considering the personnel changes that happened a few months before. On January 8, 2019, former Texas Tech head coach, Kliff Kingsbury, accepted the job as the Cardinals' new coach. A few days later on January 11, they hired former Denver Broncos head coach, Vance Joseph, as the new defensive coordinator. On January 19, the Cardinals also decided that they wouldn't hire an offensive coordinator, but rather hire Tom Clements, who was a strong offensive mind for the Green Bay Packers, as the passing game coordinator/quarterbacks coach.

The Cardinals' season started shaky. Although they managed to come back from down 24–6 against the Detroit Lions in the fourth quarter to tie it up at 24, they couldn't seal the deal, and the game ended in a 27–27 tie. The Cardinals lost their next three games against the Baltimore Ravens, Carolina Panthers, and Seattle Seahawks, before defeating the Cincinnati Bengals to acquire their first victory of the season in a high-scoring fourth quarter. The following week, they led the Atlanta Falcons 27–13 at one point, and held off a late Falcons rally to win 34–33. This was followed by a game that followed the same script: the Cardinals this time held a 17–0 lead in the middle of the second quarter, then held off a late New York Giants rally to win 27–21, which put the Cardinals at 3–3–1 for the season. Then, the Cardinals deteriorated for a long losing streak that started with a 31–9 blowout loss to the New Orleans Saints, which was followed by a near comeback victory over the San Francisco 49ers, who improved to 8–0 after that contest. After a close battle with the Tampa Bay Buccaneers, the Cardinals headed to San Francisco and lost 36–26 despite holding a 16–0 lead at one point in the game. After their bye week, the Cardinals got blown out by the Los Angeles Rams, which was followed by a 23–17 loss to the Pittsburgh Steelers. After that, the Cardinals went hot again, defeating the Cleveland Browns 38–24, then upsetting the 11–3 Seahawks 27–13 before dropping their season finale to the Rams, 31–24. The Cardinals finished 5–10–1 for the season.

Midway through the 2019 season, longtime owner Bill Bidwill died on October 2, 2019. His father had bought the team when Bill was a young child and he had seen them move twice across the country. Bill had been the sole owner of the franchise for 47 years, having a major controlling interest for 63 years, though he had ceded most of those duties twelve years prior. Arizona Cardinals president Michael Bidwill inherited his father's role as chairman as well as his majority ownership. Another son, Bill Bidwill Jr. had been vice president of the organization, but left his office sometime shortly after his father's death. Michael is only the sixth principal owner of the team since 1898.

Expectations rose for the 2020 Cardinals, fueled by a blockbuster trade for Pro Bowl wide receiver DeAndre Hopkins and the eighth overall selection of Butkus Award-winning linebacker Isaiah Simmons. Kyler Murray was discussed as a possible contender for NFL MVP with an improved offense and expectations to take a big step going into his second season. The Cardinals won six of their first nine games, including divisional wins against the San Francisco 49ers and Seattle Seahawks, as well a hotly contested game against the Buffalo Bills that ended in a Hail Mary from Kyler Murray to DeAndre Hopkins to win the game. The play would go viral and become known as the 'Hail Murray.' Oddsmakers even put Murray into their top three contenders for league MVP. The Cardinals, however, disappointed down the stretch, losing five of their last seven games, finishing the season with an 8–8 record, and missing out on the last playoff spot by way of a tiebreaker with the Chicago Bears despite the playoff expansion to 14 teams.

In the following offseason, the Cardinals continued their trend of big signings, adding many veteran players through both free agency and trade, highlighted by 3 time Defensive Player of the Year, defensive end J. J. Watt, and also included wide receiver A. J. Green, running back James Conner, and center Rodney Hudson (traded from the Las Vegas Raiders for a 3rd round pick). These 4 players had a combined 16 Pro Bowl appearances between them. For the second straight year, the Cardinals drafted a linebacker, Zaven Collins, in the first round of the 2021 NFL draft.

Once again the Cardinals started the season hot, this time winning their first 7 games, and holding the NFL's only undefeated record for four weeks. Additionally, 5 of those 7 games were won by more than 10 points, including blowouts against strong opponents such as the Tennessee Titans and Los Angeles Rams. Kyler Murray was an early favorite for MVP, with the offense averaging over 32 points per game, although on the other side of the ball, JJ Watt tore his labrum, bicep, and rotator cuff in addition to dislocating his shoulder, and was out for the remainder of the regular season.

A Thursday Night Football showdown against the Green Bay Packers saw the Cardinals lose, along with Kyler Murray taking a hit and injuring his ankle, missing the next three games. Led by backup Colt McCoy, the Cardinals went 2–1 in the month long absence of their star quarterback, beating the divisional rival San Francisco 49ers 31–17 and Seattle Seahawks 23–13, but also lost 34–10 to the Carolina Panthers. Kyler Murray returned to the field in Week 13 and led the Cardinals to a 33–22 victory over the Chicago Bears, putting the team at a record of 10–2, but the team then lost 3 straight, falling in close games to the Rams and Indianapolis Colts, but also losing 30–12 to the Detroit Lions who previously had only 1 win on the year. In Week 17 the Cardinals beat the Dallas Cowboys 25–22, snapping their losing streak, but fell to the Seahawks in the final week of the regular season, and in doing so, lost out on the NFC West title and the 3 seed. The Cardinals finished 11–6 and made the playoffs as a Wildcard team, seeded 5th, and facing off against their division rival Rams for the 3rd rematch of the season. Arizona lost 34–11 and were eliminated from postseason contention. The Rams went on to win Super Bowl LVI.

In 2022, the Cardinals regressed and failed to improve upon their record from last season with a 4–13 record, resulting in the firing of head coach Kliff Kingsbury and the resignation of general manager Steve Keim for health-related reasons. Late in the season, the future success of the team was also put in jeopardy as Kyler Murray tore his ACL on December 12, 2022.

==== Another coaching change ====
On February 14, 2023, Jonathan Gannon was hired away from coordinating the Philadelphia Eagles defense after their Super Bowl loss to become the 43rd head coach for the Cardinals franchise, their twelfth in Arizona. Gannon's first game as a head coach was a preseason victory in front of their home fans in new all-red uniforms. The first three weeks of the regular season saw the Cardinals face their erstwhile division foes, losing their first two games to Washington and the New York Giants before Gannon achieved his first win against Dallas (the Cowboys would go on to win a conference-high 12 games). However, they would have to wait awhile for a second win as they began the season 1–8. Gannon had inherited an unenviable quarterback situation, for the first half of the season relying on Joshua Dobbs, who came to the team during the preseason with a career record of 0–2. Before Week 9, Dobbs was traded in favor of playing rookie fifth-rounder Clayton Tune. At long last, in Week 10 at home against the Atlanta Falcons, Quarterback Kyler Murray made his return in uniform for the first time since his injury eleven months earlier. They would go on to upset the Falcons 25–23. Two weeks later in a loss to the Rams, the team notched its 800th regular season loss. A testament to their losing ways, only the Detroit Lions who lost their 704th that same week were within 150 of this low mark. The Cardinals would go on the finish and match their 4–13 record from previous year.

In the final game of the 2024 season, the Cardinals achieved their 600th win as a franchise (including postseason victories). Despite being the oldest franchise and one of only two charter members of the NFL, ten other teams achieved this mark before the Cardinals including the Lions and the Cowboys, the latter of which did so in 40 fewer seasons.

In 2025, the Cardinals stormed out to a 2–0 record after registering wins against the Saints and Panthers. The wins however, left Cardinals fans worried. The Cardinals proceeded to lose five straight games, including three in a row on last second field goals. In their week 5 loss to the Titans, quarterback Kyler Murray hurt his ankle and missed two snaps. Later that week, it was announced that backup quarterback Jacoby Brissett would replace Murray for at least two weeks. Brissett led them to two close losses before beating the Dallas Cowboys in an important Monday Night Football game. Two days after Brissett's victory, coach Jonathan Gannon said that quarterback Kyler Murray was placed on injured reserve and would miss at least four weeks. The team would lose their last nine games, finishing with a record of 3–14. Gannon was fired after the end of the regular season. Kyler Murray was later ruled out for the season.

==== Mike LaFleur era (2026 - present) ====
The Cardinals hired Los Angeles Rams offensive coordinator Mike LaFleur to replace Gannon on February 1, 2026. He is the brother of current Green Bay Packers head coach Matt LaFleur.
