= 2022 Arizona Cardinals season =

103rd season in franchise history; final one under Steve Keim and Kliff Kingsbury

- Owner: Michael Bidwill
- General manager: Steve Keim
- Head coach: Kliff Kingsbury
- Home stadium: State Farm Stadium

Results
- Record: 4–13
- Division place: 4th NFC West
- Playoffs: Did not qualify
- Pro Bowlers: SS Budda Baker

Uniform
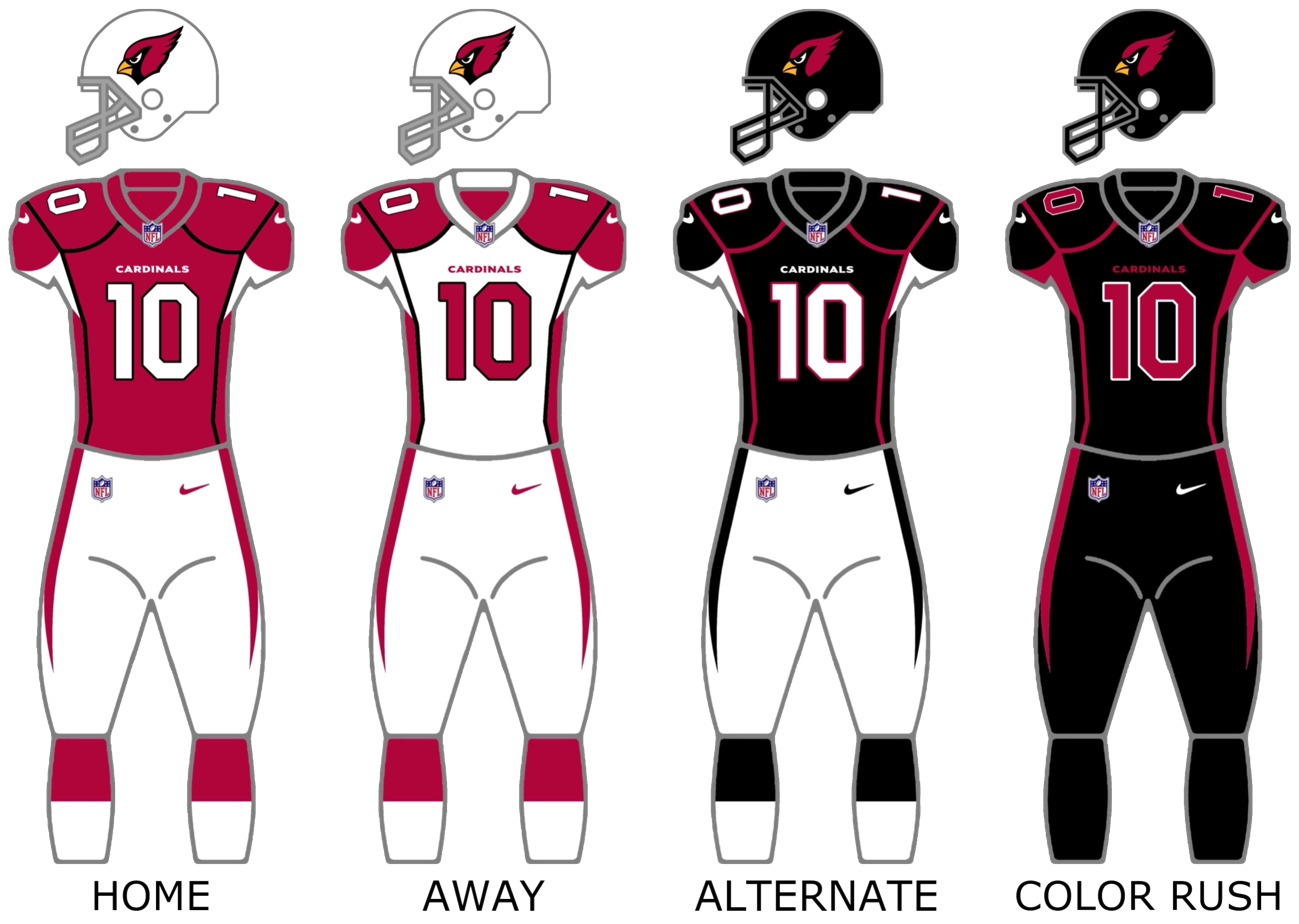

The 2022 season was the Arizona Cardinals' 103rd in the National Football League (NFL), their 35th in Arizona, and their fourth and final under head coach Kliff Kingsbury. They attempted to become the third straight team in NFL history to host and win the Super Bowl as that year's Super Bowl was held at State Farm Stadium. However, they failed to improve upon their 11–6 record from the previous year after a Week 11 loss to the San Francisco 49ers and missed the postseason after a Week 15 loss against the Denver Broncos.

Key season-ending injuries to their starters and inconsistencies on both the offensive and defensive sides of the ball ultimately led to a season-ending seven-game losing streak and a third consecutive late-season collapse, as they matched a franchise record of 13 losses in a season that was set in the 2000 and 2018 squads. To add to those struggles, they had also lost eight home games this season, surpassing the 2018 squad for the most home losses in franchise history, only having won a single home game since Week 8 of the previous season. The team was also plagued by drama before and during the season, which was seen by some observers as a reason for Arizona's dismal performance in 2022.

A day after the season ended, the team announced that neither head coach Kliff Kingsbury nor general manager Steve Keim (who held his position since 2013) would be returning the upcoming season. This would also signal the end of an era for three-time Defensive Player of the Year winner J. J. Watt, as he officially announced his retirement following an overtime loss to the Tampa Bay Buccaneers.

== Organizational drama ==
Following an 11–6 2021 season and a playoff appearance for the first time since 2015, the Cardinals hoped to become the third consecutive team to win a Super Bowl in their home stadium. Instead, Arizona experienced a disastrous and drama-plagued 2022 season.

During the offseason, quarterback Kyler Murray deleted all references towards the Cardinals organization from his social media accounts, which suggested that a rift was growing between him and the organization. Despite this, Murray and the Cardinals agreed to a 5-year, $230.5 million extension in July, but the new contract contained a film study clause that required Murray to study film for four hours a week. Several observers intensely criticized the Cardinals for the inclusion of the clause, including Hall of Fame quarterback Warren Moon, who perceived the clause as stereotypical towards black quarterbacks. In response to the criticism, the team removed the clause a week later.

Throughout the season, the relationship between Murray and head coach Kliff Kingsbury deteriorated. For example, Murray and Kingsbury engaged in a heated sideline argument during a game against the New Orleans Saints. Murray also criticized Kingsbury’s scheming and said that it was "kinda fucked" following a game against the Los Angeles Chargers. These incidents and the offseason contract situation caused others, such as former Arizona All-Pro cornerback Patrick Peterson, to question Murray’s character, focus, and work ethic.

Murray was far from the only Cardinal to be a source of drama. For example, on May 2, wide receiver DeAndre Hopkins got suspended for six games for failing a drug test. Wide receiver Marquise Brown was arrested during the offseason for speeding. Additionally, assistant coach Sean Kugler was fired by the team after he allegedly groped a woman in Mexico City before an international game against the San Francisco 49ers.

The off-field noise and injuries to key players, including Murray, were too much to overcome for Arizona, who cratered to a ghastly 4–13 record. Before and during the season, several former Cardinals, including Peterson and running back Chase Edmonds, argued that the team culture under Kingsbury, general manager Steve Keim, and team owner Michael Bidwill was responsible for the team’s general lack of success in recent seasons. Following the season, Kingsbury was fired and Keim stepped down due to health concerns.

== Draft ==
2022 Arizona Cardinals Draft
Round	Selection	Player	Position	College	Notes
1	23	Traded to Baltimore (Note: The Cardinals traded a first-round selection (23rd overall) to the Baltimore Ravens in exchange for WR Marquise Brown and a third-round selection (100th overall).)			
2	55	Trey McBride	TE	Colorado State	
3	87	Cameron Thomas	DE	San Diego State	
3	100	Myjai Sanders	DE	Cincinnati	2020 Resolution JC-2A selection; from Baltimore
4	128	Traded to Baltimore (Note: The Cardinals traded a fourth-round selection (128th overall) and a 2021 fifth-round selection to the Baltimore Ravens in exchange for 2021 fourth- and sixth-round selections.)			
5	166	Traded to Philadelphia (Note: The Cardinals traded CB Tay Gowan and a fifth-round selection (166th overall) to the Philadelphia Eagles in exchange for TE Zach Ertz.)			
6	201	Keaontay Ingram	RB	USC	
6	215	Lecitus Smith	OG	Virginia Tech	Compensatory pick
7	244	Christian Matthew	CB	Valdosta State	
7	256	Jesse Luketa	LB	Penn State	Compensatory pick
7	257	Marquis Hayes	OG	Oklahoma	Compensatory pick

Draft trades

2022 Arizona Cardinals undrafted free agents
Name	Position	College	Ref.
Darrell Baker Jr.	CB	Georgia Southern	
Tae Daley	DB	Virginia Tech	
Jarrett Guarantano	QB	Washington State	
Changa Hodge	WR	Virginia Tech	
Manny Jones	DE	Colorado State	
Kekaula Kaniho	S	Boise State	
Jontre Kirklin	WR	LSU	
Will Miles	DE	Central Michigan	
JaVonta Payton	WR	Tennessee	
Chris Pierce Jr.	TE	Vanderbilt	
Ronnie Rivers	RB	Fresno State	
Stephon Robinson Jr.	WR	Northwestern	
LaRon Stokes	DT	Oklahoma	
Chandler Wooten	LB	Auburn	

== Staff ==
2022 Arizona Cardinals staff
Front office: Owner/chairman/president – Michael Bidwill; General manager – Steve Keim; Vice president of player personnel – Quentin Harris; Vice president of pro personnel – Adrian Wilson; Vice president of football operations & facilities – Matt Caracciolo; Director of player personnel – Dru Grigson; Director of college scouting – Chris Culmer; Director of football administration – Matt Harriss; Senior personnel executive – Terry McDonough; Head coaches: Head coach – Kliff Kingsbury; Associate head coach/wide receivers – Shawn Jefferson; Assistant head coach/special teams coordinator – Jeff Rodgers; Chief of staff/offensive assistant – Kenny Bell; Offensive coaches: Co–pass game coordinator – Spencer Whipple; Co–pass game coordinator/quarterbacks – Cameron Turner; Tight ends – Steve Heiden; Assistant offensive line – Brian Natkin; Offensive assistant – Mike Bercovici; Bill Bidwill Fellowship/quarterbacks – Connor Senger	Defensive coaches: Defensive coordinator – Vance Joseph; Defensive line – Matt Burke; Linebackers – Billy Davis; Outside linebackers – Charlie Bullen; Defensive backs – Marcus Robertson; Cornerbacks – Greg Williams; Defensive assistant – Ronald Booker; Defensive assistant – Rusty McKinney; Defensive quality control – Rob Grosso; Special teams coaches: Assistant special teams – Devin Fitzsimmons; Strength and conditioning: Strength and conditioning – Buddy Morris; Assistant strength and conditioning – Mark Naylor

== Final roster ==
2022 Arizona Cardinals roster
Quarterbacks (QB): 17 David Blough; 12 Colt McCoy; 19 Trace McSorley; Running backs (RB): 23 Corey Clement; 6 James Conner; 30 Keaontay Ingram; 22 Ty'Son Williams; Wide receivers (WR): 3 Robbie Anderson; 82 Andre Baccellia; 2 Marquise Brown; 15 Pharoh Cooper; 83 Greg Dortch; 18 A. J. Green; 10 DeAndre Hopkins; Tight ends (TE): 89 Stephen Anderson; 85 Trey McBride; 87 Maxx Williams	Offensive linemen (OL): 68 Kelvin Beachum T; 65 Rashaad Coward G; 72 Cody Ford G; 75 Max Garcia G; 64 Sean Harlow G/C; 76 Will Hernandez G; 79 Josh Jones T; 53 Billy Price C; 54 Lecitus Smith G/C; Defensive linemen (DL): 94 Zach Allen DE; 69 Eric Banks DE; 91 Michael Dogbe DE; 95 Leki Fotu NT; 96 Manny Jones DE; 99 J. J. Watt DE	Linebackers (LB): 25 Zaven Collins ILB; 52 Victor Dimukeje OLB; 45 Dennis Gardeck OLB; 44 Markus Golden OLB; 57 Kamu Grugier-Hill ILB; 43 Jesse Luketa OLB; 56 Ben Niemann OLB; 41 Myjai Sanders OLB; 9 Isaiah Simmons ILB; 97 Cameron Thomas OLB; 47 Ezekiel Turner ILB; 51 Tanner Vallejo ILB; Defensive backs (DB): 33 Antonio Hamilton CB; 16 Josh Jackson CB; 35 Christian Matthew CB; 32 Josh Thomas FS; 34 Jalen Thompson SS; 28 Charles Washington FS; 39 Jace Whittaker CB; 20 Marco Wilson CB; Special teams (ST): 48 Hunter Bradley LS; 14 Andy Lee P; 5 Matt Prater K	Practice squad: 50 Julién Davenport T; 27 Nate Hairston CB (PS/I); 36 JuJu Hughes SS; 55 Blake Lynch ILB; 16 James Morgan QB; 49 Chris Pierce TE; 80 Bernhard Seikovits TE (IPP); 73 Lachavious Simmons T; 29 Auden Tate WR; 70 Badara Traore T; 38 Chris Wilcox CB; 84 Javon Wims WR; Reserve: 3 Budda Baker FS (IR); 31 Chris Banjo SS (IR); 46 Aaron Brewer LS (IR); 86 Zach Ertz TE (IR); 78 Marquis Hayes G (IR); 98 Trysten Hill NT (IR); 61 Rodney Hudson C (IR); 74 D. J. Humphries T (IR); 90 Rashard Lawrence NT (IR); 93 Jonathan Ledbetter DE (IR); 66 Joshua Miles T (IR); 4 Rondale Moore WR (IR); 7 Byron Murphy CB (IR); 1 Kyler Murray QB (IR); 67 Justin Pugh G (IR); 59 Nick Vigil OLB (IR); 13 Antoine Wesley WR (IR); 24 Darrel Williams RB (IR); Rookies in italics 56 active, 18 reserve, 11 practice squad (1 exempt)

== Preseason ==
Week	Date	Opponent	Result	Record	Venue	Recap
1	August 12	at Cincinnati Bengals	W 36–23	1–0	Paycor Stadium	Recap
2	August 21	Baltimore Ravens	L 17–24	1–1	State Farm Stadium	Recap
3	August 27	at Tennessee Titans	L 23–26	1–2	Nissan Stadium	Recap

== Regular season ==
=== Schedule ===
Week	Date	Opponent	Result	Record	Venue	Recap
1	September 11	Kansas City Chiefs	**L** 21–44	0–1	State Farm Stadium	Recap
2	September 18	at Las Vegas Raiders	**W** 29–23 (OT)	1–1	Allegiant Stadium	Recap
3	September 25	**Los Angeles Rams**	**L** 12–20	1–2	State Farm Stadium	Recap
4	October 2	at Carolina Panthers	**W** 26–16	2–2	Bank of America Stadium	Recap
5	October 9	Philadelphia Eagles	**L** 17–20	2–3	State Farm Stadium	Recap
6	October 16	at **Seattle Seahawks**	**L** 9–19	2–4	Lumen Field	Recap
7	October 20	New Orleans Saints	**W** 42–34	3–4	State Farm Stadium	Recap
8	October 30	at Minnesota Vikings	**L** 26–34	3–5	U.S. Bank Stadium	Recap
9	November 6	**Seattle Seahawks**	**L** 21–31	3–6	State Farm Stadium	Recap
10	November 13	at **Los Angeles Rams**	**W** 27–17	4–6	SoFi Stadium	Recap
11	November 21	**San Francisco 49ers**	**L** 10–38	4–7	Estadio Azteca (Mexico City)	Recap
12	November 27	Los Angeles Chargers	**L** 24–25	4–8	State Farm Stadium	Recap
13	Bye					
14	December 12	New England Patriots	**L** 13–27	4–9	State Farm Stadium	Recap
15	December 18	at Denver Broncos	**L** 15–24	4–10	Empower Field at Mile High	Recap
16	December 25	Tampa Bay Buccaneers	**L** 16–19 (OT)	4–11	State Farm Stadium	Recap
17	January 1	at Atlanta Falcons	**L** 19–20	4–12	Mercedes-Benz Stadium	Recap
18	January 8	at **San Francisco 49ers**	**L** 13–38	4–13	Levi's Stadium	Recap

Note: Intra-division opponents are in bold text.

=== Game summaries ===
==== Week 1: vs. Kansas City Chiefs ====
Week 1: Kansas City Chiefs at Arizona Cardinals – Game summary

Quarter	1	2	3	4	Total
**Chiefs**	14	9	14	7	**44**
Cardinals	0	7	0	14	**21**

at State Farm Stadium, Glendale, Arizona

- Date: September 11
- Game time: 1:25 p.m. MST
- Game weather: None (retractable roof closed)
- Game attendance: 63,697
- Referee: Scott Novak
- TV announcers (CBS): Jim Nantz, Tony Romo and Tracy Wolfson
- Recap, Game Book

Game information

**First quarter**

- KC – Travis Kelce 9-yard pass from Patrick Mahomes (Harrison Butker kick), 9:37. Chiefs 7–0. **Drive: 11 plays, 75 yards, 5:23.**
- KC – Clyde Edwards-Helaire 3-yard pass from Patrick Mahomes (Harrison Butker kick), 3:20. Chiefs 14–0. **Drive: 7 plays, 86 yards, 4:23.**

**Second quarter**

- ARI – James Conner 2-yard rush (Matt Prater kick), 13:05. Chiefs 14–7. **Drive: 11 plays, 75 yards, 5:15.**
- KC – Clyde Edwards-Helaire 4-yard pass from Patrick Mahomes (kick failed, wide right), 7:32. Chiefs 20–7. **Drive: 11 plays, 75 yards, 5:33.**
- KC – Harrison Butker 54-yard field goal, 0:02. Chiefs 23–7. **Drive: 6 plays, 30 yards, 0:33.**

**Third quarter**

- KC – Jody Fortson 1-yard pass from Patrick Mahomes (Harrison Butker kick), 9:55. Chiefs 30–7. **Drive: 4 plays, 75 yards, 2:12.**
- KC – Mecole Hardman 2-yard pass from Patrick Mahomes (Harrison Butker kick), 3:56. Chiefs 37–7. **Drive: 8 plays, 66 yards, 4:53.**

**Fourth quarter**

- ARI – Marquise Brown 6-yard pass from Kyler Murray (Kyler Murray–Zach Ertz pass), 12:52. Chiefs 37–15. **Drive: 14 plays, 75 yards, 6:04.**
- KC – Isiah Pacheco 3-yard rush (Harrison Butker kick), 7:39. Chiefs 44–15. **Drive: 9 plays, 66 yards, 5:13.**
- ARI – Zach Ertz 6-yard pass from Kyler Murray (pass failed), 5:11. Chiefs 44–21. **Drive: 6 plays, 48 yards, 2:28.**

**Top passers**

- KC – Patrick Mahomes – 30/39, 360 yards, 5 TD
- ARI – Kyler Murray – 22/34, 193 yards, 2 TD

**Top rushers**

- KC – Isiah Pacheco – 12 rushes, 62 yards, TD
- ARI – Kyler Murray – 5 rushes, 29 yards

**Top receivers**

- KC – Travis Kelce – 8 receptions, 121 yards, TD
- ARI – Greg Dortch – 7 receptions, 63 yards

The Cardinals were quickly overwhelmed by a high-powered Chiefs defense, finding themselves down 7–37 at the end of the third quarter. A late rally attempt fell well short, and Arizona was handed an 0–1 start for the first time since 2018.

==== Week 2: at Las Vegas Raiders ====
Week 2: Arizona Cardinals at Las Vegas Raiders – Game summary

Quarter	1	2	3	4	OT	Total
**Cardinals**	0	0	7	16	6	**29**
Raiders	7	13	3	0	0	**23**

at Allegiant Stadium, Paradise, Nevada

- Date: September 18
- Game time: 1:25 p.m. MST & PDT
- Game weather: None (indoor stadium)
- Game attendance: 61,707
- Referee: Clete Blakeman
- TV announcers (CBS): Greg Gumbel, Adam Archuleta and AJ Ross
- Recap, Game Book

Game information

**First quarter**

- LV – Davante Adams 1-yard pass from Derek Carr (Daniel Carlson kick), 5:22. Raiders 7–0. **Drive: 15 plays, 75 yards, 9:38.**

**Second quarter**

- LV – Daniel Carlson 32-yard field goal, 11:40. Raiders 10–0. **Drive: 9 plays, 66 yards, 4:41.**
- LV – Darren Waller 3-yard pass from Derek Carr (Daniel Carlson kick), 7:00. Raiders 17–0. **Drive: 7 plays, 59 yards, 2:02.**
- LV – Daniel Carlson 55-yard field goal, 0:00. Raiders 20–0. **Drive: 9 plays, 36 yards, 1:51.**

**Third quarter**

- ARI – Greg Dortch 5-yard pass from Kyler Murray (Matt Prater kick), 6:03. Raiders 20–7. **Drive: 11 plays, 79 yards, 5:27.**
- LV – Daniel Carlson 25-yard field goal, 1:38. Raiders 23–7. **Drive: 8 plays, 68 yards, 4:25.**

**Fourth quarter**

- ARI – Darrel Williams 1-yard rush (Kyler Murray run), 8:13. Raiders 23–15. **Drive: 9 plays, 54 yards, 3:54.**
- ARI – Kyler Murray 3-yard rush (Kyler Murray–A. J. Green pass), 0:00. Tied 23–23. **Drive: 18 plays, 73 yards, 4:43.**

**Overtime**

- ARI – Byron Murphy 59-yard fumble return, 3:51. Cardinals 29–23.

**Top passers**

- ARI – Kyler Murray – 31/49, 277 yards, TD, INT
- LV – Derek Carr – 25/39, 252 yards, 2 TD

**Top rushers**

- ARI – Darrel Williams – 8 rushes, 59 yards, TD
- LV – Josh Jacobs – 19 rushes, 69 yards

**Top receivers**

- ARI – Zach Ertz – 8 receptions, 75 yards
- LV – Hunter Renfrow – 7 receptions, 59 yards

After trailing 7–23 at the end of the third quarter, the Cardinals came back to force overtime. A fumble recovery led to a Cardinals touchdown. With the win, they improved to 1–1.

==== Week 3: vs. Los Angeles Rams ====
Week 3: Los Angeles Rams at Arizona Cardinals – Game summary

Quarter	1	2	3	4	Total
**Rams**	10	3	7	0	**20**
Cardinals	0	6	3	3	**12**

at State Farm Stadium, Glendale, Arizona

- Date: September 25
- Game time: 1:25 p.m. MST
- Game weather: None (retractable roof closed)
- Game attendance: 63,243
- Referee: Adrian Hill
- TV announcers (Fox): Kevin Kugler, Mark Sanchez and Laura Okmin
- Recap, Game Book

Game information

**First quarter**

- LAR – Matt Gay 22-yard field goal, 9:45. Rams 3–0. **Drive: 8 plays, 31 yards, 3:49.**
- LAR – Cooper Kupp 20-yard run (Matt Gay kick), 4:00. Rams 10–0. **Drive: 7 plays, 58 yards, 4:50.**

**Second quarter**

- LAR – Matt Gay 40-yard field goal, 13:23. Rams 13–0. **Drive: 6 plays, 58 yards, 3:08.**
- ARI – Matt Prater 23-yard field goal, 1:51. Rams 13–3. **Drive: 19 plays, 65 yards, 9:30.**
- ARI – Matt Prater 43-yard field goal, 0:02. Rams 13–6. **Drive: 8 plays, 47 yards, 0:46.**

**Third quarter**

- ARI – Matt Prater 49-yard field goal, 5:10. Rams 13–9. **Drive: 16 plays, 58 yards, 7:47.**
- LAR – Cam Akers 14-yard run (Matt Gay kick), 1:00. Rams 20–9. **Drive: 8 plays, 75 yards, 4:10.**

**Fourth quarter**

- ARI – Matt Prater 31-yard field goal, 1:07. Rams 20–12. **Drive: 17 plays, 84 yards, 5:32.**

**Top passers**

- LAR – Matthew Stafford – 18/25, 249 yards
- ARI – Kyler Murray – 37/58, 314 yards

**Top rushers**

- LAR – Cam Akers – 12 rushes, 61 yards, TD
- ARI – James Conner – 13 rushes, 39 yards

**Top receivers**

- LAR – Ben Skowronek – 4 receptions, 66 yards
- ARI – Marquise Brown – 14 receptions, 140 yards

With 1:07 left, Matt Prater attempted an onside kick, but failed. With the loss, the Cardinals dropped to 1–2.

==== Week 4: at Carolina Panthers ====
Week 4: Arizona Cardinals at Carolina Panthers – Game summary

Quarter	1	2	3	4	Total
**Cardinals**	0	3	7	16	**26**
Panthers	0	10	0	6	**16**

at Bank of America Stadium, Charlotte, North Carolina

- Date: October 2
- Game time: 4:05 p.m. EDT/1:05 p.m. MST
- Game weather: Mostly cloudy, 65 °F (18 °C)
- Game attendance: 69,810
- Referee: John Hussey
- TV announcers (Fox): Kenny Albert, Jonathan Vilma and Shannon Spake
- Recap, Game Book

Game information

**First quarter**

- No scoring plays.

**Second quarter**

- CAR – Frankie Luvu 33-yard interception return (Eddy Piñeiro kick), 12:13. Panthers 7–0.
- ARI – Matt Prater 33-yard field goal, 3:34. Panthers 7–3. **Drive: 8 plays, 50 yards, 3:19.**
- CAR – Eddy Piñeiro 54-yard field goal, 3:34. Panthers 10–3. **Drive: 5 plays, 29 yards, 0:21.**

**Third quarter**

- ARI – Zach Ertz 2-yard pass from Kyler Murray (Matt Prater kick), 7:42. Tied 10–10. **Drive: 9 plays, 89 yards, 5:08.**

**Fourth quarter**

- ARI – Matt Prater 39-yard field goal, 3:34. Cardinals 13–10. **Drive: 15 plays, 57 yards, 9:26.**
- ARI - Kyler Murray 4-yard run (Matt Prater kick), 10:26. Cardinals 20–10. **Drive: 2 plays, 5 yards, 0:42**
- ARI – Marquise Brown 23-yard pass from Kyler Murray (pass failed), 7:37. Cardinals 26–10. **Drive: 3 plays, 31 yards, 1:36.**
- CAR – Christian McCaffrey 13-yard pass from Baker Mayfield (pass failed), 4:47. Cardinals 26–16. **Drive: 9 plays, 74 yards, 2:50.**

**Top passers**

- ARI – Kyler Murray – 23/32, 207 yards, 2 TD, INT
- CAR – Baker Mayfield – 22/36, 197 yards, TD, 2 INT

**Top rushers**

- ARI – James Conner – 15 rushes, 55 yards
- CAR – Christian McCaffrey – 8 rushes, 27 yards

**Top receivers**

- ARI – Marquise Brown – 6 receptions, 88 yards, TD
- CAR – Christian McCaffrey – 9 receptions, 81 yards, TD

After stopping a Panthers' comeback, the Cardinals won the game 26–16. With the win, the Cardinals improved to 2–2.

==== Week 5: vs. Philadelphia Eagles ====
Week 5: Philadelphia Eagles at Arizona Cardinals – Game summary

Quarter	1	2	3	4	Total
**Eagles**	7	7	3	3	**20**
Cardinals	0	10	0	7	**17**

at State Farm Stadium, Glendale, Arizona

- Date: October 9
- Game time: 1:25 p.m. MST
- Game weather: None (retractable roof closed)
- Game attendance: 63,919
- Referee: Tra Blake
- TV announcers (Fox): Chris Myers, Robert Smith and Jen Hale
- Recap, Game Book

Game information

**First quarter**

- PHI – Jalen Hurts 1–yard run (Cameron Dicker kick), 8:02. Eagles 7–0. **Drive: 11 plays, 64 yards, 4:13.**

**Second quarter**

- PHI – Jalen Hurts 1-yard run (Cameron Dicker kick), 10:11. Eagles 14–0. **Drive: 16 plays, 87 yards, 7:20.**
- ARI – Marquise Brown 25-yard pass from Kyler Murray (Matt Ammendola kick), 5:24. Eagles 14–7. **Drive: 6 plays, 57 yards, 2:16.**
- ARI – Matt Ammendola 20-yard field goal, 0:00. Eagles 14–10. **Drive: 16 plays, 91 yards, 3:22.**

**Third quarter**

- PHI – Cameron Dicker 42-yard field goal, 9:57. Eagles 17–10. **Drive: 10 plays, 51 yards, 5:03.**

**Fourth quarter**

- ARI – Eno Benjamin 11-yard run (Matt Ammendola kick), 9:43. Tied 17–17. **Drive: 12 plays, 90 yards, 5:37.**
- PHI – Cameron Dicker 23-yard field goal, 1:45. Eagles 20–17. **Drive: 17 plays, 70 yards, 7:58.**

**Top passers**

- PHI – Jalen Hurts – 26/36, 239 yards
- ARI – Kyler Murray – 28/42, 250 yards, TD, INT

**Top rushers**

- PHI – Jalen Hurts – 15 rushes, 61 yards, 2 TD
- ARI – James Conner – 9 rushes, 55 yards

**Top receivers**

- PHI – DeVonta Smith – 10 receptions, 87 yards
- ARI – Marquise Brown – 8 receptions, 78 yards, TD

Not only did the Cardinals lose to the Eagles at home for the first time since 2001, but they also lost their eighth consecutive game at State Farm Stadium. A missed field goal with 0:22 left sealed the loss for the Cardinals.

==== Week 6: at Seattle Seahawks ====
Week 6: Arizona Cardinals at Seattle Seahawks – Game summary

Quarter	1	2	3	4	Total
Cardinals	3	0	6	0	**9**
**Seahawks**	3	6	3	7	**19**

at Lumen Field, Seattle, Washington

- Date: October 16
- Game time: 1:05 p.m. MST & PDT
- Game weather: Sunny, 72 °F (22 °C)
- Game attendance: 68,867
- Referee: Shawn Hochuli
- TV announcers (Fox): Chris Myers, Robert Smith and Jen Hale
- Recap, Game Book

Game information

**First quarter**

- ARI – Matt Ammendola 23-yard field goal, 10:20. Cardinals 3–0. **Drive: 10 plays, 76 yards, 4:40.**
- SEA – Jason Myers 39-yard field goal, 6:41. Tied 3–3. **Drive: 8 plays, 54 yards, 3:39.**

**Second quarter**

- SEA – Jason Myers 27-yard field goal, 6:05. Seahawks 6–3. **Drive: 10 plays, 51 yards, 4:44.**
- SEA – Jason Myers 34-yard field goal, 0:00. Seahawks 9–3. **Drive: 7 plays, 53 yards, 0:55.**

**Third quarter**

- SEA – Jason Myers 32-yard field goal, 4:11. Seahawks 12–3. **Drive: 9 plays, 58 yards, 5:00.**
- ARI – Chris Banjo fumble recovery in the end zone (kick failed, wide left), 0:54. Seahawks 12–9.

**Fourth quarter**

- SEA – Kenneth Walker III 11-yard run (Jason Myers kick), 13:24. Seahawks 19–9. **Drive: 7 plays, 75 yards, 2:30.**

**Top passers**

- ARI – Kyler Murray – 23/37, 222 yards, INT
- SEA – Geno Smith – 20/31, 197 yards

**Top rushers**

- ARI – Kyler Murray – 10 rushes, 100 yards
- SEA – Kenneth Walker III – 21 rushes, 97 yards, TD

**Top receivers**

- ARI – Zach Ertz – 7 receptions, 70 yards
- SEA – Noah Fant – 6 receptions, 45 yards

==== Week 7: vs. New Orleans Saints ====
Week 7: New Orleans Saints at Arizona Cardinals – Game summary

Quarter	1	2	3	4	Total
Saints	7	7	3	17	**34**
**Cardinals**	3	25	7	7	**42**

at State Farm Stadium, Glendale, Arizona

- Date: October 20
- Game time: 5:15 p.m. MST
- Game weather: Sunny, 89 °F (32 °C) (retractable roof open)
- Game attendance: 63,290
- Referee: Jerome Boger
- TV announcers (KSAZ/Prime Video): Al Michaels, Kirk Herbstreit and Kaylee Hartung
- Recap, Game Book

Game information

**First quarter**

- NO – Rashid Shaheed 53-yard pass from Andy Dalton (Wil Lutz kick), 12:53. Saints 7–0. **Drive: 4 plays, 75 yards, 2:07.**
- ARI – Rodrigo Blankenship 50-yard field goal, 10:54. Saints 7–3. **Drive: 6 plays, 43 yards, 1:59.**

**Second quarter**

- ARI – Rodrigo Blankenship 28-yard field goal, 13:15. Saints 7–6. **Drive: 9 plays, 70 yards, 3:51.**
- NO – Taysom Hill 3-yard pass from Andy Dalton (Wil Lutz kick), 10:29. Saints 14–6. **Drive: 5 plays, 75 yards, 2:46.**
- ARI – Keaontay Ingram 2-yard run (Eno Benjamin run), 2:28. Tied 14–14. **Drive: 13 plays, 75 yards, 8:01.**
- ARI – Marco Wilson 38-yard interception return (kick failed, wide left), 1:50. Cardinals 20–14.
- ARI – Isaiah Simmons 56-yard interception return (Kyler Murray–Zach Ertz pass), 0:46. Cardinals 28–14.

**Third quarter**

- NO – Wil Lutz 25-yard field goal, 9:44. Cardinals 28–17. **Drive: 9 plays, 54 yards, 4:16.**
- ARI – Greg Dortch 5-yard pass from Kyler Murray (Rodrigo Blankenship kick), 0:29. Cardinals 35–17. **Drive: 12 plays, 85 yards, 6:31.**

**Fourth quarter**

- NO – Juwan Johnson 17-yard pass from Andy Dalton (Wil Lutz kick), 11:14. Cardinals 35–24. **Drive: 5 plays, 46 yards, 1:40.**
- ARI – Eno Benjamin 5-yard run (Rodrigo Blankenship kick), 6:22. Cardinals 42–24. **Drive: 8 plays, 64 yards, 4:52.**
- NO – Juwan Johnson 1-yard pass from Andy Dalton (Wil Lutz kick), 3:07. Cardinals 42–31. **Drive: 11 plays, 75 yards, 3:15.**
- NO – Wil Lutz 45-yard field goal, 0:43. Cardinals 42–34. **Drive: 10 plays, 53 yards, 1:57.**

**Top passers**

- NO – Andy Dalton – 30/47, 361 yards, 4 TD, 3 INT
- ARI – Kyler Murray – 20/29, 204 yards, TD

**Top rushers**

- NO – Alvin Kamara – 11 rushes, 49 yards
- ARI – Eno Benjamin – 12 rushes, 92 yards, TD

**Top receivers**

- NO – Chris Olave – 7 receptions, 106 yards
- ARI – DeAndre Hopkins – 10 receptions, 103 yards

This would be the first time the Arizona Cardinals scored more than 40 points in a game since January 1, 2017 at the LA Rams ( 44–7 ). This was also the Cardinals' only home win of the season.

==== Week 8: at Minnesota Vikings ====
Week 8: Arizona Cardinals at Minnesota Vikings – Game summary

Quarter	1	2	3	4	Total
Cardinals	3	7	13	3	**26**
**Vikings**	7	7	14	6	**34**

at U.S. Bank Stadium, Minneapolis, Minnesota

- Date: October 30
- Game time: 12:00 p.m. CDT/10:00 a.m. MST
- Game weather: None (indoor stadium)
- Game attendance: 66,742
- Referee: Brad Allen
- TV announcers (Fox): Chris Myers, Mark Schlereth and Kristina Pink
- Recap, Game Book

Game information

**First quarter**

- MIN – Kirk Cousins 17-yard run (Greg Joseph kick), 10:12. Vikings 7–0. **Drive: 10 plays, 75 yards, 4:48.**
- ARI – Matt Prater 44-yard field goal, 6:04. Vikings 7–3. **Drive: 8 plays, 49 yards, 4:08.**

**Second quarter**

- MIN – Johnny Mundt 1-yard pass from Kirk Cousins (Greg Joseph kick), 9:54. Vikings 14–3. **Drive: 9 plays, 83 yards, 5:00.**
- ARI – DeAndre Hopkins 6-yard pass from Kyler Murray (Matt Prater kick), 0:47. Vikings 14–10. **Drive: 10 plays, 72 yards, 2:52.**

**Third quarter**

- ARI – Zach Ertz 8-yard pass from Kyler Murray (Matt Prater kick), 9:01. Cardinals 17–14. **Drive: 5 plays, 52 yards, 2:14.**
- MIN – Alexander Mattison 7-yard run (Greg Joseph kick), 5:47. Vikings 21–17. **Drive: 8 plays, 75 yards, 3:14.**
- MIN – Dalvin Cook 4-yard run (Greg Joseph kick), 4:07. Vikings 28–17. **Drive: 4 plays, 31 yards, 1:20.**
- ARI – Rondale Moore 38-yard pass from Kyler Murray (pass failed), 2:27. Vikings 28–23. **Drive: 4 plays, 70 yards, 1:40.**

**Fourth quarter**

- ARI – Matt Prater 34-yard field goal, 12:32. Vikings 28–26. **Drive: 7 plays, 8 yards, 3:27.**
- MIN – K. J. Osborn 5-yard pass from Kirk Cousins (kick failed, hit left upright), 8:36. Vikings 34–26. **Drive: 4 plays, 25 yards, 1:58.**

**Top passers**

- ARI – Kyler Murray – 31/44, 326 yards, 3 TD, 2 INT
- MIN – Kirk Cousins – 24/36, 232 yards, 2 TD

**Top rushers**

- ARI – Kyler Murray – 6 rushes, 36 yards
- MIN – Dalvin Cook – 20 rushes, 111 yards, TD

**Top receivers**

- ARI – DeAndre Hopkins – 12 receptions, 159 yards, TD
- MIN – Justin Jefferson – 6 receptions, 98 yards

==== Week 9: vs. Seattle Seahawks ====
Week 9: Seattle Seahawks at Arizona Cardinals – Game summary

Quarter	1	2	3	4	Total
**Seahawks**	3	7	7	14	**31**
Cardinals	7	0	7	7	**21**

at State Farm Stadium, Glendale, Arizona

- Date: November 6
- Game time: 2:05 p.m. MST
- Game weather: Sunny, 76 °F (24 °C) (retractable roof open)
- Game attendance: 63,982
- Referee: Carl Cheffers
- TV announcers (Fox): Adam Amin, Daryl Johnston and Pam Oliver
- Recap, Game Book

Game information

**First quarter**

- SEA – Jason Myers 49-yard field goal, 10:50. Seahawks 3–0. **Drive: 8 plays, 34 yards, 4:10.**
- ARI – DeAndre Hopkins 22-yard pass from Kyler Murray (Matt Prater kick), 6:17. Cardinals 7–3. **Drive: 9 plays, 83 yards, 4:33.**

**Second quarter**

- SEA – DK Metcalf 4-yard pass from Geno Smith (Jason Myers kick), 11:59. Seahawks 10–7. **Drive: 12 plays, 79 yards, 6:08.**

**Third quarter**

- ARI – Zaven Collins 30-yard interception return (Matt Prater kick), 9:18. Cardinals 14–10.
- SEA – Tyler Lockett 9-yard pass from Geno Smith (Jason Myers kick), 2:43. Seahawks 17–14. **Drive: 13 plays, 75 yards, 6:35.**

**Fourth quarter**

- SEA – Kenneth Walker III 1-yard run (Jason Myers kick), 7:32. Seahawks 24–14. **Drive: 13 plays, 81 yards, 6:46.**
- ARI – Zach Ertz 6-yard pass from Kyler Murray (Matt Prater kick), 3:32. Seahawks 24–21. **Drive: 14 plays, 75 yards, 4:00.**
- SEA – Kenneth Walker III 5-yard run (Jason Myers kick), 2:14. Seahawks 31–21. **Drive: 5 plays, 85 yards, 1:18.**

**Top passers**

- SEA – Geno Smith – 26/34, 275 yards, 2 TD, INT
- ARI – Kyler Murray – 25/35, 175 yards, 2 TD

**Top rushers**

- SEA – Kenneth Walker III – 26 rushes, 109 yards, 2 TD
- ARI – Kyler Murray – 8 rushes, 60 yards

**Top receivers**

- SEA – Noah Fant – 5 receptions, 96 yards
- ARI – Rondale Moore – 8 receptions, 69 yards

==== Week 10: at Los Angeles Rams ====
Week 10: Arizona Cardinals at Los Angeles Rams – Game summary

Quarter	1	2	3	4	Total
**Cardinals**	3	14	0	10	**27**
Rams	3	0	7	7	**17**

at SoFi Stadium, Inglewood, California

- Date: November 13
- Game time: 2:25 p.m. MST/1:25 p.m. PST
- Game weather: Sunny, 68 °F (20 °C)
- Game attendance: 71,752
- Referee: Clete Blakeman
- TV announcers (Fox): Kenny Albert, Jonathan Vilma and Shannon Spake
- Recap, Game Book

Game information

**First quarter**

- LAR – Matt Gay 36-yard field goal, 6:16. Rams 3–0. **Drive: 14 plays, 57 yards, 8:44.**
- ARI – Tristan Vizcaino 36-yard field goal, 0:13. Tied 3–3. **Drive: 14 plays, 57 yards, 6:03.**

**Second quarter**

- ARI – James Conner 4-yard run (Tristan Vizcaino kick), 1:56. Cardinals 10–3. **Drive: 13 plays, 66 yards, 6:31.**
- ARI – A. J. Green 6-yard pass from Colt McCoy (Tristan Vizcaino kick), 0:24. Cardinals 17–3. **Drive: 5 plays, 30 yards, 1:10.**

**Third quarter**

- LAR – Darrell Henderson 4-yard run (Matt Gay kick), 4:24. Cardinals 17-10.**Drive: 7 plays, 59 yards, 3:07.**

**Fourth quarter**

- ARI – James Conner 9-yard run (Tristan Vizcaino kick), 7:41. Cardinals 24–10. **Drive: 9 plays, 60 yards, 5:03.**
- ARI – Tristan Vizcaino 46-yard field goal, 3:44. Cardinals 27–10. **Drive: 4 plays, -3 yards, 1:49.**
- LAR – Van Jefferson 3-yard pass from John Wolford (Matt Gay kick), 0:07. Cardinals 27–17. **Drive: 11 plays, 75 yards, 3:37.**

**Top passers**

- ARI – Colt McCoy – 26/37, 238 yards, TD
- LAR – John Wolford – 24/36, 212 yards, TD, INT

**Top rushers**

- ARI – James Conner – 21 rushes, 69 yards, 2 TD
- LAR – Cam Akers – 6 rushes, 22 yards

**Top receivers**

- ARI – DeAndre Hopkins – 10 receptions, 98 yards
- LAR – Tyler Higbee – 8 receptions, 73 yards

==== Week 11: vs. San Francisco 49ers ====
NFL Mexico City games

Week 11: San Francisco 49ers at Arizona Cardinals – Game summary

Quarter	1	2	3	4	Total
**49ers**	0	17	14	7	**38**
Cardinals	3	7	0	0	**10**

at Estadio Azteca, Mexico City, Mexico

- Date: November 21
- Game time: 6:15 p.m. MST
- Game weather: Rain, 60 °F (16 °C)
- Game attendance: 78,427
- Referee: Craig Wrolstad
- TV announcers (KPHO/ESPN): Joe Buck, Troy Aikman and Lisa Salters
- Recap, Game Book

Game information

**First quarter**

- ARI – Matt Prater 40-yard field goal, 8:00. Cardinals 3–0. **Drive: 11 plays, 58 yards, 4:38.**

**Second quarter**

- SF – Brandon Aiyuk 7-yard pass from Jimmy Garoppolo (Robbie Gould kick), 13:35. 49ers 7–3. **Drive: 9 plays, 82 yards, 4:06.**
- SF – George Kittle 39-yard pass from Jimmy Garoppolo (Robbie Gould kick), 8:42. 49ers 14–3. **Drive: 3 plays, 46 yards, 0:55.**
- ARI – James Conner 2-yard run (Matt Prater kick), 4:19. 49ers 14–10. **Drive: 9 plays, 75 yards, 4:23.**
- SF – Robbie Gould 39-yard field goal, 0:43. 49ers 17–10. **Drive: 10 plays, 54 yards, 3:36.**

**Third quarter**

- SF – Deebo Samuel 39-yard run (Robbie Gould kick), 10:34. 49ers 24–10. **Drive: 8 plays, 75 yards, 4:26.**
- SF – Brandon Aiyuk 13-yard pass from Jimmy Garoppolo (Robbie Gould kick), 0:28. 49ers 31–10. **Drive: 6 plays, 47 yards, 3:57.**

**Fourth quarter**

- SF – George Kittle 32-yard pass from Jimmy Garoppolo (Robbie Gould kick), 10:08. 49ers 38–10. **Drive: 5 plays, 50 yards, 3:02.**

**Top passers**

- SF – Jimmy Garoppolo – 20/29, 228 yards, 4 TD
- ARI – Colt McCoy – 24/34, 218 yards, INT

**Top rushers**

- SF – Elijah Mitchell – 9 rushes, 59 yards
- ARI – James Conner – 14 rushes, 42 yards, TD

**Top receivers**

- SF – George Kittle – 4 receptions, 84 yards, 2 TD
- ARI – Greg Dortch – 9 receptions, 103 yards

==== Week 12: vs. Los Angeles Chargers ====
Week 12: Los Angeles Chargers at Arizona Cardinals – Game summary

Quarter	1	2	3	4	Total
**Chargers**	0	14	3	8	**25**
Cardinals	7	10	0	7	**24**

at State Farm Stadium, Glendale, Arizona

- Date: November 27
- Game time: 2:05 p.m. MST
- Game weather: None (retractable roof closed)
- Game attendance: 63,628
- Referee: Ronald Torbert
- TV announcers (CBS): Kevin Harlan, Trent Green and Melanie Collins
- Recap, Game Book

Game information

**First quarter**

- ARI – DeAndre Hopkins 33-yard pass from Kyler Murray (Matt Prater kick), 2:33. Cardinals 7–0. **Drive: 10 plays, 82 yards, 6:32.**

**Second quarter**

- ARI – Matt Prater 43-yard field goal, 14:03. Cardinals 10–0. **Drive: 7 plays, 19 yards, 2:48.**
- LAC – Keenan Allen 2-yard pass from Justin Herbert (Cameron Dicker kick), 8:51. Cardinals 10–7. **Drive: 11 plays, 75 yards, 5:12.**
- LAC – DeAndre Carter 33-yard pass from Justin Herbert (Cameron Dicker kick), 4:28. Chargers 14–10. **Drive: 5 plays, 56 yards, 2:35.**
- ARI – Kyler Murray 5-yard run (Matt Prater kick), 0:12. Cardinals 17–14. **Drive: 14 plays, 75 yards, 4:16.**

**Third quarter**

- LAC – Cameron Dicker 26-yard field goal, 4:28. Tied 17–17. **Drive: 14 plays, 53 yards, 6:33.**

**Fourth quarter**

- ARI – James Conner 6-yard pass from Kyler Murray (Matt Prater kick), 13:31. Cardinals 24–17. **Drive: 11 plays, 75 yards, 5:57.**
- LAC – Austin Ekeler 1-yard pass from Justin Herbert (Justin Herbert–Gerald Everett pass), 0:15. Chargers 25–24. **Drive: 7 plays, 38 yards, 1:33.**

**Top passers**

- LAC – Justin Herbert – 35/47, 274 yards, 3 TD
- ARI – Kyler Murray – 18/29, 191 yards, 2 TD, INT

**Top rushers**

- LAC – Justin Herbert – 4 rushes, 38 yards
- ARI – James Conner – 25 rushes, 120 yards

**Top receivers**

- LAC – DeAndre Carter – 7 receptions, 73 yards
- ARI – DeAndre Hopkins – 4 receptions, 87 yards, TD

==== Week 14: vs. New England Patriots ====
Week 14: New England Patriots at Arizona Cardinals – Game summary

Quarter	1	2	3	4	Total
**Patriots**	0	10	10	7	**27**
Cardinals	0	13	0	0	**13**

at State Farm Stadium, Glendale, Arizona

- Date: December 12
- Game time: 6:15 p.m. MST
- Game weather: None (retractable roof closed)
- Game attendance: 63,251
- Referee: Shawn Smith
- TV announcers (KPHO/ESPN): Joe Buck, Troy Aikman and Lisa Salters
- Recap, Game Book

Game information

**First quarter**

- No scoring plays.

**Second quarter**

- ARI – Matt Prater 33-yard field goal, 14:52. Cardinals 3–0. **Drive: 7 plays, 21 yards, 2:16.**
- NE – Kevin Harris 14-yard run (Nick Folk kick), 11:25. Patriots 7–3. **Drive: 8 plays, 75 yards, 3:27.**
- ARI – Matt Prater 32-yard field goal, 9:35. Patriots 7–6. **Drive: 6 plays, 56 yards, 1:50.**
- ARI – James Conner 10-yard run (Matt Prater kick), 2:59. Cardinals 13–7. **Drive: 7 plays, 63 yards, 3:54.**
- NE – Nick Folk 51-yard field goal, 0:00. Cardinals 13–10. **Drive: 6 plays, 35 yards, 0:32.**

**Third quarter**

- NE – Nick Folk 23-yard field goal, 10:15. Tied 13–13. **Drive: 8 plays, 71 yards, 4:45.**
- NE – Raekwon McMillan 23-yard fumble return (Nick Folk kick), 5:32. Patriots 20–13.

**Fourth quarter**

- NE – Pierre Strong Jr. 3-yard run (Nick Folk kick), 14:09. Patriots 27–13. **Drive: 5 plays, 63 yards, 1:58.**

**Top passers**

- NE – Mac Jones – 24/35, 235 yards, INT
- ARI – Colt McCoy – 27/40, 246 yards, INT

**Top rushers**

- NE – Pierre Strong Jr. – 5 rushes, 70 yards, TD
- ARI – James Conner – 15 rushes, 85 yards, TD

**Top receivers**

- NE – Hunter Henry – 3 receptions, 70 yards
- ARI – DeAndre Hopkins – 11 receptions, 79 yards

With the loss the Cardinals dropped to 4-9.

==== Week 15: at Denver Broncos ====
Week 15: Arizona Cardinals at Denver Broncos – Game summary

Quarter	1	2	3	4	Total
Cardinals	0	6	3	6	**15**
**Broncos**	3	0	7	14	**24**

at Empower Field at Mile High, Denver, Colorado

- Date: December 18
- Game time: 2:05 p.m. MST
- Game weather: Parly cloudy, 39 °F (4 °C)
- Game attendance: 75,179
- Referee: Jerome Boger
- TV announcers (Fox): Chris Myers, Robert Smith and Jen Hale
- Recap, Game Book

Game information

**First quarter**

- DEN – Brandon McManus 52-yard field goal, 10:27. Broncos 3–0. **Drive: 10 plays, 41 yards, 4:33.**

**Second quarter**

- ARI – Matt Prater 45-yard field goal, 10:35. Tied 3–3. **Drive: 11 plays, 45 yards, 4:57.**
- ARI – Matt Prater 50-yard field goal, 0:00. Cardinals 6–3. **Drive: 4 plays, 19 yards, 0:38.**

**Third quarter**

- ARI – Matt Prater 55-yard field goal, 8:55. Cardinals 9–3. **Drive: 11 plays, 38 yards, 6:05.**
- DEN – Marlon Mack 3-yard run (Brandon McManus kick), 5:58. Broncos 10–9. **Drive: 7 plays, 80 yards, 2:57.**

**Fourth quarter**

- DEN – Latavius Murray 10-yard run (Brandon McManus kick), 11:00. Broncos 17–9. **Drive: 6 plays, 56 yards, 2:25.**
- DEN – Eric Tomlinson 3-yard pass from Brett Rypien (Brandon McManus kick), 9:29. Broncos 24–9. **Drive: 2 plays, 5 yards, 0:41.**
- ARI – James Conner 1-yard run (pass failed), 6:01. Broncos 24–15. **Drive: 7 plays, 78 yards, 3:28.**

**Top passers**

- ARI – Colt McCoy – 13/21, 78 yards, INT
- DEN – Brett Rypien – 21/26, 196 yards, TD, INT

**Top rushers**

- ARI – James Conner – 16 rushes, 63 yards, TD
- DEN – Latavius Murray – 24 rushes, 130 yards, TD

**Top receivers**

- ARI – DeAndre Hopkins – 7 receptions, 60 yards
- DEN – Jerry Jeudy – 7 receptions, 76 yards

With the loss the Cardinals were eliminated from playoff contention and dropped to 4-10.

==== Week 16: vs. Tampa Bay Buccaneers ====
Christmas Day games

Week 16: Tampa Bay Buccaneers at Arizona Cardinals – Game summary

Quarter	1	2	3	4	OT	Total
**Buccaneers**	3	3	0	10	3	**19**
Cardinals	3	3	0	10	0	**16**

at State Farm Stadium, Glendale, Arizona

- Date: December 25
- Game time: 6:20 p.m. MST
- Game weather: Clear, 69 °F (21 °C) (retractable roof open)
- Game attendance: 63,393
- Referee: John Hussey
- TV announcers (NBC): Mike Tirico, Cris Collinsworth and Melissa Stark
- Recap, Game Book

Game information

**First quarter**

- TB – Ryan Succop 38-yard field goal, 13:23. Buccaneers 3–0. **Drive: 5 plays, 55 yards, 1:37.**
- ARI – Matt Prater 56-yard field goal, 0:32. Tied 3–3. **Drive: 5 plays, 23 yards, 1:15.**

**Second quarter**

- TB – Ryan Succop 35-yard field goal, 8:14. Buccaneers 6–3. **Drive: 15 plays, 58 yards, 7:18.**
- ARI – Matt Prater 53-yard field goal, 0:08. Tied 6–6. **Drive: 9 plays, 35 yards, 0:59.**

**Third quarter**

- No scoring plays.

**Fourth quarter**

- ARI – Matt Prater 39-yard field goal, 14:07. Cardinals 9–6. **Drive: 9 plays, 60 yards, 4:01.**
- ARI – James Conner 22-yard run (Matt Prater kick), 10:47. Cardinals 16–6. **Drive: 5 plays, 33 yards, 1:39.**
- TB – Rachaad White 3-yard pass from Tom Brady (Ryan Succop kick), 8:03. Cardinals 16–13. **Drive: 7 plays, 67 yards, 2:44.**
- TB – Ryan Succop 42-yard field goal, 2:27. Tied 16–16. **Drive: 9 plays, 31 yards, 2:22.**

**Overtime**

- TB – Ryan Succop 40-yard field goal, 3:41. Buccaneers 19–16. **Drive: 9 plays, 66 yards, 4:02.**

**Top passers**

- TB – Tom Brady – 32/48, 281 yards, TD, 2 INT
- ARI – Trace McSorley – 24/45, 217 yards, INT

**Top rushers**

- TB – Leonard Fournette – 20 rushes, 72 yards
- ARI – James Conner – 15 rushes, 79 yards, TD

**Top receivers**

- TB – Leonard Fournette – 9 receptions, 90 yards
- ARI – Greg Dortch – 10 receptions, 98 yards

==== Week 17: at Atlanta Falcons ====
Week 17: Arizona Cardinals at Atlanta Falcons – Game summary

Quarter	1	2	3	4	Total
Cardinals	3	10	3	3	**19**
**Falcons**	0	14	0	6	**20**

at Mercedes-Benz Stadium, Atlanta, Georgia

- Date: January 1
- Game time: 1:00 p.m. EST/11:00 a.m. MST
- Game weather: None (retractable roof closed)
- Game attendance: 69,269
- Referee: Alex Kemp
- TV announcers (Fox): Jason Benetti, Brady Quinn and Megan Olivi
- Recap, Game Book

Game information

**First quarter**

- ARI – Matt Prater 38-yard field goal, 8:24. Cardinals 3–0. **Drive: 14 plays, 55 yards, 6:36.**

**Second quarter**

- ATL – Tyler Allgeier 5-yard run (Younghoe Koo kick), 13:38. Falcons 7–3. **Drive: 16 plays, 75 yards, 9:46.**
- ARI – Trey McBride 4-yard pass from David Blough (Matt Prater kick), 10:00. Cardinals 10–7. **Drive: 2 plays, 8 yards, 0:36.**
- ATL – Cordarrelle Patterson 5-yard run (Younghoe Koo kick), 1:47. Falcons 14–10. **Drive: 1 plays, 5 yards, 0:04.**
- ARI – Matt Prater 36-yard field goal, 0:02. Falcons 14–13. **Drive: 10 plays, 62 yards, 1:45.**

**Third quarter**

- ARI – Matt Prater 36-yard field goal, 9:00. Cardinals 16–14. **Drive: 11 plays, 81 yards, 3:47.**

**Fourth quarter**

- ATL – Younghoe Koo 27-yard field goal, 9:36. Falcons 17–16. **Drive: 9 plays, 46 yards, 3:51.**
- ARI – Matt Prater 57-yard field goal, 4:57. Cardinals 19–17. **Drive: 11 plays, 36 yards, 4:39.**
- ATL – Younghoe Koo 21-yard field goal, 0:00. Falcons 20–19. **Drive: 12 plays, 72 yards, 4:57.**

**Top passers**

- ARI – David Blough – 24/40, 222 yards, TD
- ATL – Desmond Ridder – 19/26, 169 yards

**Top rushers**

- ARI – James Conner – 16 rushes, 79 yards
- ATL – Tyler Allgeier – 20 rushes, 83 yards

**Top receivers**

- ARI – Trey McBride – 7 receptions, 78 yards, TD
- ATL – MyCole Pruitt – 4 receptions, 49 yards

==== Week 18: at San Francisco 49ers ====
Week 18: Arizona Cardinals at San Francisco 49ers – Game summary

Quarter	1	2	3	4	Total
Cardinals	6	7	0	0	**13**
**49ers**	7	14	17	0	**38**

at Levi's Stadium, Santa Clara, California

- Date: January 8
- Game time: 1:25 p.m. PST
- Game weather: Cloudy, 60 °F (16 °C)
- Game attendance: 71,638
- Referee: Adrian Hill
- TV announcers (Fox): Chris Myers, Robert Smith and Jen Hale
- Recap, Game Book

Game information

**First quarter**

- ARI – A. J. Green 77-yard pass from David Blough (kick failed), 14:18. Cardinals 6–0. **Drive: 2 plays, 80 yards, 0:42.**
- SF – Christian McCaffrey 21-yard pass from Brock Purdy (Robbie Gould kick), 10:40. 49ers 7–6. **Drive: 6 plays, 75 yards, 3:38.**

**Second quarter**

- SF – Elijah Mitchell 5-yard run (Robbie Gould kick), 12:07. 49ers 14–6. **Drive: 3 plays, 18 yards, 1:43.**
- ARI – Corey Clement 1-yard run (Matt Prater kick), 4:41. 49ers 14–13. **Drive: 12 plays, 75 yards, 7:26.**
- SF – George Kittle 4-yard pass from Brock Purdy (Robbie Gould kick), 0:19. 49ers 21–13. **Drive: 9 plays, 66 yards, 4:22.**

**Third quarter**

- SF – Elijah Mitchell 6-yard run (Robbie Gould kick), 11:32. 49ers 28–13. **Drive: 7 plays, 75 yards, 3:28.**
- SF – Robbie Gould 27-yard field goal, 5:47. 49ers 31–13. **Drive: 8 plays, 25 yards, 4:36.**
- SF – George Kittle 1-yard pass from Brock Purdy (Robbie Gould kick), 1:01. 49ers 38–13. **Drive: 6 plays, 28 yards, 3:12.**

**Fourth quarter**

- No scoring plays.

**Top passers**

- ARI – David Blough – 14/18, 180 yards, TD, 2 INT
- SF – Brock Purdy – 15/20, 178 yards, 3 TD

**Top rushers**

- ARI – Corey Clement – 8 rushes, 23 yards, TD
- SF – Elijah Mitchell – 5 rush, 55 yards, 2 TD

**Top receivers**

- ARI – A. J. Green – 3 receptions, 91 yards, TD
- SF – Brandon Aiyuk – 4 receptions, 59 yards

=== Standings ===
==== Division ====
NFC West
	W	L	T	PCT	DIV	CONF	PF	PA	STK
^{(2)} San Francisco 49ers	13	4	0	.765	6–0	10–2	450	277	W10
^{(7)} Seattle Seahawks	9	8	0	.529	4–2	6–6	407	401	W2
Los Angeles Rams	5	12	0	.294	1–5	3–9	307	384	L2
Arizona Cardinals	4	13	0	.235	1–5	3–9	340	449	L7

==== Conference ====
NFC
#	Team	Division	W	L	T	PCT	DIV	CONF	SOS	SOV	STK
**Division leaders**
1	Philadelphia Eagles	East	14	3	0	.824	4–2	9–3	.474	.460	W1
2 (Note: San Francisco claimed the No. 2 seed over Minnesota based on conference record (10–2 vs. 8–4).)	San Francisco 49ers	West	13	4	0	.765	6–0	10–2	.417	.414	W10
3	Minnesota Vikings	North	13	4	0	.765	4–2	8–4	.474	.425	W1
4	Tampa Bay Buccaneers	South	8	9	0	.471	4–2	8–4	.503	.426	L1
**Wild cards**
5	Dallas Cowboys	East	12	5	0	.706	4–2	8–4	.507	.485	L1
6	New York Giants	East	9	7	1	.559	1–4–1	4–7–1	.526	.395	L1
7 (Note: Seattle finished ahead of Detroit based on head-to-head victory, claiming the 7th and final playoff spot.)	Seattle Seahawks	West	9	8	0	.529	4–2	6–6	.462	.382	W2
**Did not qualify for the postseason**
8	Detroit Lions	North	9	8	0	.529	5–1	7–5	.535	.451	W2
9	Washington Commanders	East	8	8	1	.500	2–3–1	5–6–1	.536	.449	W1
10	Green Bay Packers	North	8	9	0	.471	3–3	6–6	.524	.449	L1
11 (Note: Carolina finished ahead of New Orleans and Atlanta based on head-to-head record (3–1 vs. 2–2/1–3).)	Carolina Panthers	South	7	10	0	.412	4–2	6–6	.474	.437	W1
12 (Note: New Orleans finished ahead of Atlanta based on head-to-head sweep.)	New Orleans Saints	South	7	10	0	.412	2–4	5–7	.507	.462	L1
13	Atlanta Falcons	South	7	10	0	.412	2–4	6–6	.467	.429	W2
14	Los Angeles Rams	West	5	12	0	.294	1–5	3–9	.517	.341	L2
15	Arizona Cardinals	West	4	13	0	.235	1–5	3–9	.529	.368	L7
16	Chicago Bears	North	3	14	0	.176	0–6	1–11	.571	.480	L10
**Tiebreakers** (Note: When breaking ties for three or more teams under the NFL's rules, they are first broken within divisions, then comparing only the highest-ranked remaining team from each division.)

== Statistics ==
=== Starters ===
Offense

Pos.	Name	GS
QB	Kyler Murray; Colt McCoy; David Blough; Trace McSorley	11; 3; 2; 1
RB	James Conner; Eno Benjamin; Corey Clement	13; 3; 1
WR	Marquise Brown; A.J. Green; DeAndre Hopkins; Rondale Moore; Greg Dortch; Robbie Chosen; Pharoh Cooper	10; 10; 9; 8; 4; 2; 1
TE	Trey McBride; Zach Ertz; Maxx Williams	13; 10; 1
LT	D.J. Humphries; Josh Jones	8; 9
LG	Justin Pugh; Max Garcia; Cody Ford; Rashaad Coward; Sean Harlow	5; 5; 3; 3; 1
C	Rodney Hudson; Sean Harlow; Billy Price	4; 2; 11
RG	Will Hernandez; Lecitus Smith; Max Garcia	13; 2; 2
RT	Kelvin Beachum	17

Defense

Pos.	Name	GS
DE	J.J. Watt; Michael Dogbe	16; 1
NT	Leki Fotu; Rashard Lawrence; Michael Dogbe	11; 5; 1
DE	Zach Allen; Jonathan Ledbetter; Michael Dogbe	14; 2; 1
OLB	Myjai Sanders; Dennis Gardeck; Victor Dimukeje	8; 6; 3
ILB	Ben Niemann; Nick Vigil	13; 4
ILB	Zaven Collins; Zeke Turner	16; 1
OLB	Markus Golden	17
LCB	Byron Murphy; Antonio Hamilton; Christian Matthew	9; 5; 3
CB	Marco Wilson; Jace Whittaker	14; 3
SS	Budda Baker; Jalen Thompson	15; 2
FS	Jalen Thompson; Chris Banjo	15; 2
NB	Isaiah Simmons	17

Special Teams

Pos.	Name	GS
P	Andy Lee	17
K	Matt Prater; Matt Ammendola; Rodrigo Blankenship	13; 2; 2
LS	Aaron Brewer; Hunter Bradley	15; 2

=== Individual leaders ===
Category	Player(s)	Value
Passing yards	Kyler Murray	2,368
Passing touchdowns	Kyler Murray	14
Rushing yards	James Conner	782
Rushing touchdowns	James Conner	7
Receptions	Marquise Brown	67
Receiving yards	DeAndre Hopkins	717
Receiving touchdowns	Zach Ertz	4
Kickoff return yards	Pharoh Cooper	288
Punt return yards	Greg Dortch	172
Tackles	Budda Baker	111
Sacks	J.J. Watt	12.5
Forced fumbles	Isaiah Simmons	2
Interceptions	Marco Wilson	3
Kicking - field goals	Matt Prater	22/25, 88.0%
Kicking - extra points	Matt Prater	17/18, 94.4%

=== Team rankings ===
Category	Value	NFL rank (out of 32)
Passing attempts	664	
Passing completions	433	4th
Passing yards	3,626	18th
Passing touchdowns	17	24th
Interceptions thrown	17	28th
Rushing attempts	434	20th
Rushing yards	1,873	22nd
Rushing touchdowns	15	16th
Rushing yards/attempt	4.3	20th
Total yards of offense	5,499	22nd
Points scored	340	21st
Points allowed	449	31st
Passing yards allowed	3,915	24th
Passing touchdowns allowed	29	28th
Rushing attempts against	446	12nd
Rushing yards allowed	2,016	14th
Rushing touchdowns allowed	21	27th
Yards/rush attempt allowed	4.5	21st
Interceptions made	11	21st
Fumbles recovered	9	17th
Total yards allowed	5,931	21st

Statistical values are correct through January 8, 2023

== See also ==
- List of organizational conflicts in the NFL
- Racial issues faced by black quarterbacks
