= Lombardi Award =

Award for best American football college player of the year

Rotary Lombardi Award
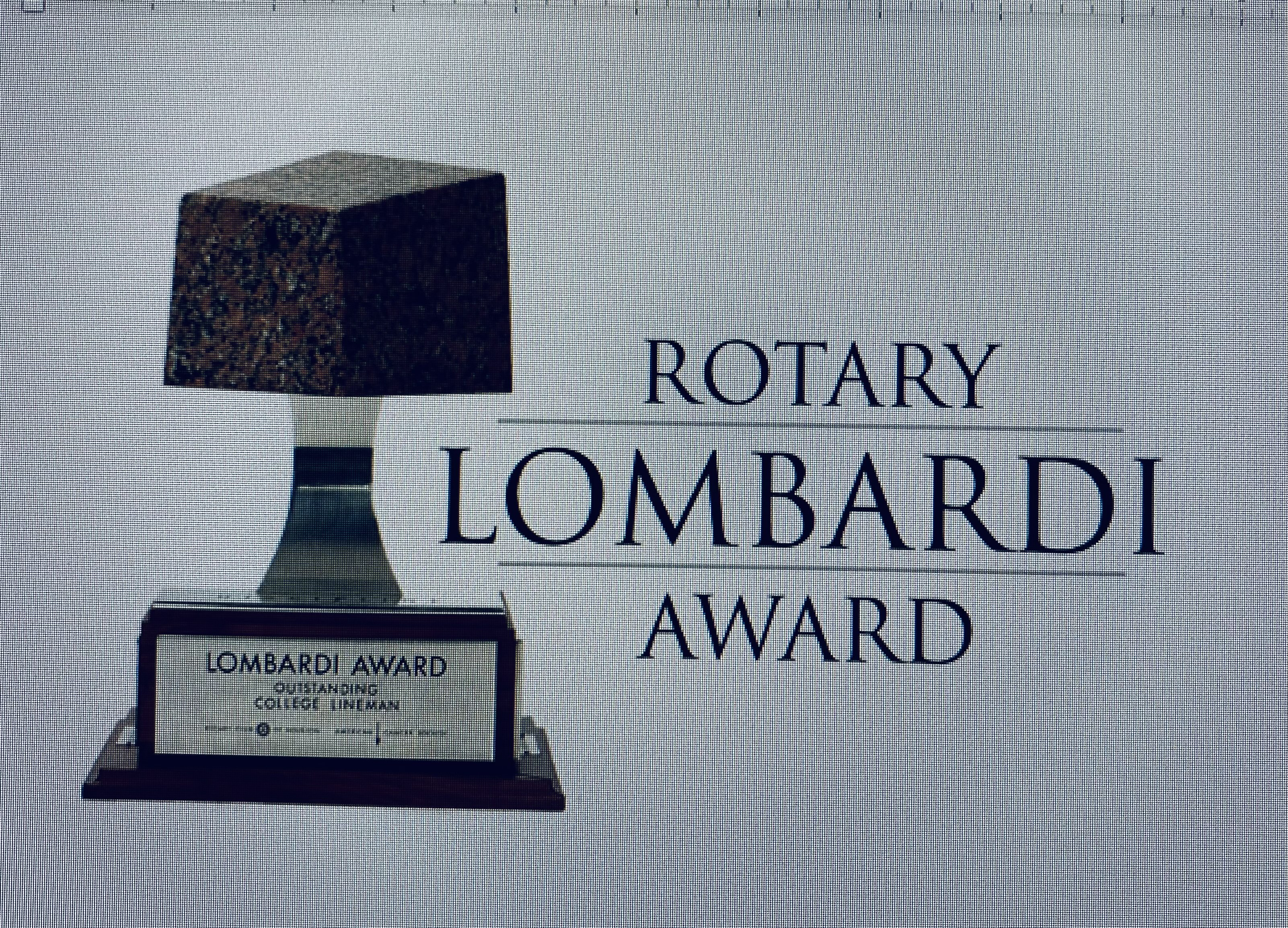
- Awarded for: The best college football lineman of the year
- Location: Houston, Texas
- Country: United States
- Presented by: Rotary Club of Houston

History
- First award: 1970
- Most recent: Texas Tech linebacker Jacob Rodriguez
- Website: https://www.rotarylombardiaward.org

The Rotary Lombardi Award is an award for college football in the United States. Awarded by the Rotary Club of Houston, Texas annually to the college football player "who best embodies the values and spirit of NFL's legendary coach Vince Lombardi" the Rotary Lombardi Award program was created in 1970 shortly after the death of Lombardi. The committee outlined the original criteria for eligibility for the award, which remained in place until this day:

== History ==
Following the death of highly regarded football coach Vince Lombardi in 1970 his widow, Marie, authorized the Rotary Club of Houston to establish the Rotary Lombardi Award. The award began as recognition to only interior line positions that Vince Lombardi played while an undergraduate at Fordham University, offensive and defensive guard, and later expanded to include linebackers and tight ends, with the addition of including non-performance values: leadership, courage, desire, respect for authority, and discipline.

To be considered for the award, players must be an NCAA FBS College Football team member and meet the following qualifications:

- Be a down Lineman, end to end, either on offense or defense, setting up no further than ten yards to the left or right of the ball at the time of the snap.
- Be a Linebacker on defense, setting up no further than five yards deep from the line of scrimmage.
- Must not come out of the offensive backfield and set up on the line of scrimmage as a Blocker or a Receiver or listed in the program as an Offensive Back or Receiver.
- Be eligible to participate in the current season.

The voting electorate is made up of the head coaches from all NCAA Division I schools, sports media personnel from across the country, and former winners and finalists of the Lombardi Award. The total number of voters is approximately 500. The Ohio State University holds the record for most Lombardi awards with six. Orlando Pace, the only two-time winner (1995 and 1996), was the most recent offensive lineman to be honored until 2024, when Kelvin Banks, Jr. of the Texas Longhorns took home the award.

Net proceeds from the award activities are contributed to cancer research, awareness, and treatment, on the stipulation of Marie Lombardi.

=== Expansion of candidates, then retraction ===
In 2017, the presenting Rotary Club expanded the award's eligibility to include all positions. This lasted until 2021, when they reverted to the original criteria. The winners from 2017 through 2020 are not recognized by the current award committee, although 2020 winner Zaven Collins qualified under the original criteria.

Unrecognized recipients
Year	Player	Position	School	Ref
2017	Bryce Love	Running back	Stanford	
2018	Ugo Amadi	Safety	Oregon	
2019	Joe Burrow	Quarterback	LSU	
2020	Zaven Collins	Linebacker	Tulsa	

=== Trophy ===
The main part of the trophy is a block of granite, paying homage to Lombardi's college days at Fordham University as an offensive lineman when his offensive line was referred to as the "Seven Blocks of Granite".

== Winners ==
Year	Player	Position	School	Ref
1970	Jim Stillwagon	Middle guard	Ohio State	
1971	Walt Patulski	Defensive tackle	Notre Dame	
1972	Rich Glover	Middle guard	Nebraska	
1973	John Hicks	Offensive tackle	Ohio State (2)	
1974	Randy White	Defensive tackle	Maryland	
1975	Lee Roy Selmon	Defensive tackle	Oklahoma	
1976	Wilson Whitley	Defensive tackle	Houston	
1977	Ross Browner	Defensive end	Notre Dame (2)	
1978	Bruce Clark	Defensive tackle	Penn State	
1979	Brad Budde	Guard	USC	
1980	Hugh Green	Defensive end	Pittsburgh	
1981	Kenneth Sims	Defensive tackle	Texas	
1982	Dave Rimington	Center	Nebraska (2)	
1983	Dean Steinkuhler	Offensive tackle	Nebraska (3)	
1984	Tony Degrate	Defensive tackle	Texas (2)	
1985	Tony Casillas	Defensive tackle	Oklahoma (2)	
1986	Cornelius Bennett	Linebacker	Alabama	
1987	Chris Spielman	Linebacker	Ohio State (3)	
1988	Tracy Rocker	Defensive tackle	Auburn	
1989	Percy Snow	Linebacker	Michigan State	
1990	Chris Zorich	Defensive tackle	Notre Dame (3)	
1991	Steve Emtman	Defensive tackle	Washington	
1992	Marvin Jones	Linebacker	Florida State	
1993	Aaron Taylor	Offensive tackle	Notre Dame (4)	
1994	Warren Sapp	Defensive tackle	Miami (FL)	
1995	Orlando Pace	Offensive tackle	Ohio State (4)	
1996	Orlando Pace (2)	Offensive tackle	Ohio State (5)	
1997	Grant Wistrom	Defensive end	Nebraska (4)	
1998	Dat Nguyen	Linebacker	Texas A&M	
1999	Corey Moore	Defensive end	Virginia Tech	
2000	Jamal Reynolds	Defensive tackle	Florida State (2)	
2001	Julius Peppers	Defensive end	North Carolina	
2002	Terrell Suggs	Defensive end	Arizona State	
2003	Tommie Harris	Defensive tackle	Oklahoma (3)	
2004	David Pollack	Defensive end	Georgia	
2005	A. J. Hawk	Linebacker	Ohio State (6)	
2006	LaMarr Woodley	Defensive end	Michigan	
2007	Glenn Dorsey	Defensive tackle	LSU	
2008	Brian Orakpo	Defensive end	Texas (3)	
2009	Ndamukong Suh	Defensive tackle	Nebraska (5)	
2010	Nick Fairley	Defensive tackle	Auburn (2)	
2011	Luke Kuechly	Linebacker	Boston College	
2012	Manti Te'o	Linebacker	Notre Dame (5)	
2013	Aaron Donald	Defensive tackle	Pittsburgh (2)	
2014	Scooby Wright	Linebacker	Arizona	
2015	Carl Nassib	Defensive end	Penn State (2)	
2016	Jonathan Allen	Defensive tackle	Alabama (2)	
2017	Bryce Love	Running back	Stanford	
2018	Ugo Amadi	Safety	Oregon	
2019	Joe Burrow	Quarterback	LSU (2)	
2020	Zaven Collins	Linebacker	Tulsa	
2021	Aidan Hutchinson	Defensive end	Michigan (2)	
2022	Will Anderson Jr.	Linebacker	Alabama (3)	
2023	Laiatu Latu	Defensive end	UCLA	
2024	Kelvin Banks Jr.	Offensive tackle	Texas (4)	
2025	Jacob Rodriguez	Linebacker	Texas Tech	

== See also ==
- Outland Trophy, awarded annually to the best interior lineman in college football
- Rimington Trophy, awarded annually to the best center in college football
- Ted Hendricks Award, awarded annually to the best defensive end in college football
- UPI College Football Lineman of the Year
