= Christian Matthew =

American football player (born 1996)

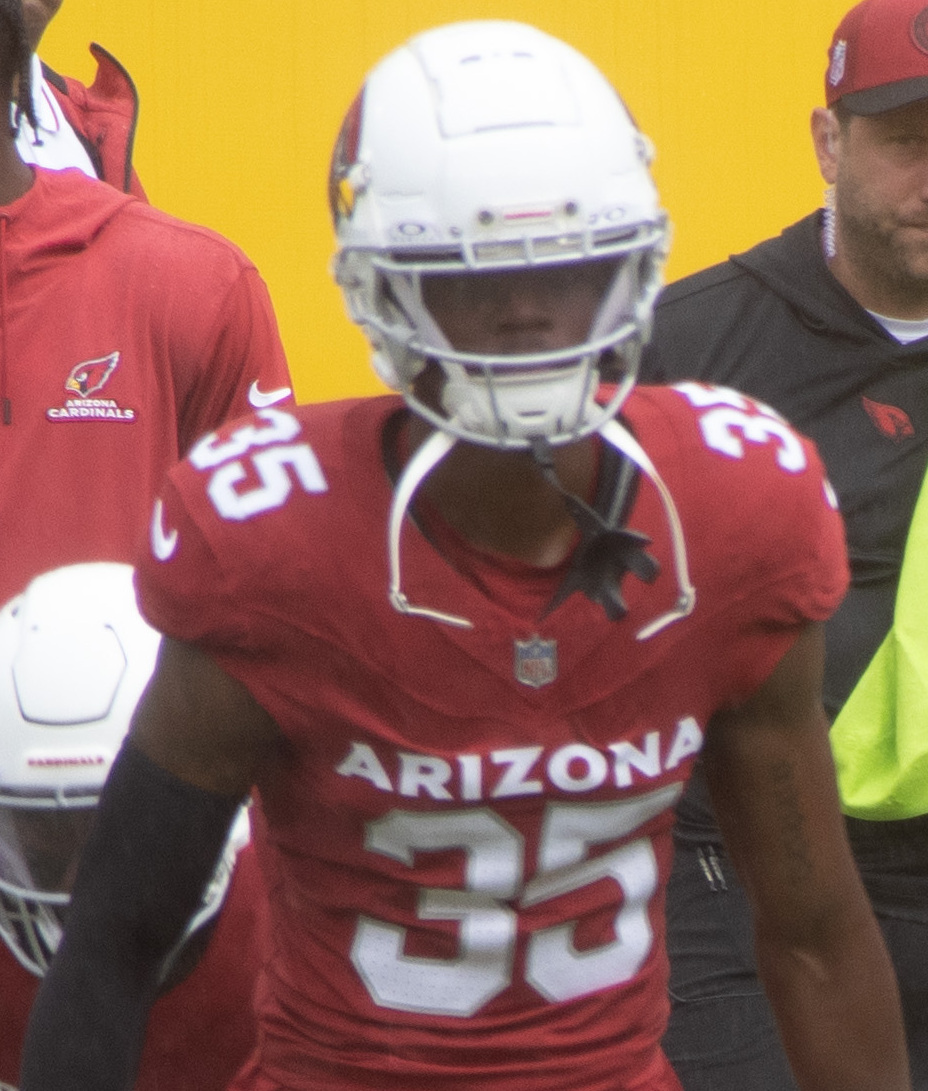
- Matthew with the Arizona Cardinals in 2023

Profile
- Position: Cornerback

Personal information
- Born: October 26, 1996 (age 30); Miami, Florida, U.S.
- Listed height: 6 ft 2 in (1.88 m)
- Listed weight: 195 lb (88 kg)

Career information
- High school: Chattahoochee County (Cusseta, Georgia)
- College: Georgia Southern (2015–2017); Samford (2018–2019); Valdosta State (2020–2021)
- NFL draft: 2022: 7th round, 244th overall pick

Career history
- Arizona Cardinals (2022–2023); Chicago Bears (2023)*; Baltimore Ravens (2023–2024)*; Dallas Cowboys (2025)*; Orlando Storm (2026)*; Rhein Fire (2026); Ottawa Redblacks (2026)
- * Offseason or practice squad member only

Awards and highlights
- First-team All-GSC (2021)

Career NFL statistics as of 2025
- Total tackles: 20
- Pass deflections: 3
- Stats at Pro Football Reference

Christian Matthew (born October 26, 1996) is an American professional football cornerback. He played college football for the Georgia Southern Eagles before transferring to the Samford Bulldogs, and then to the Valdosta State Blazers, where he was tied for fifth in the nation in pass break ups and was named first-team All-Gulf South Conference. Matthew was invited to and participated in the 2022 College Gridirion Showcase post-season all-star event.

As a senior at Chattahoochee High School, Matthew had 29 catches for 629 yards at wide receiver and 64 tackles and four interceptions on defense on his way to being named second-team all-state and First-team All-Bi-City. He enrolled at Georgia Southern after his senior year before transferring to Samford, citing the lack of a transfer portal influencing his decision to go to an FCS school rather than sit out a year.

== Professional career ==
Pre-draft measurables
Height	Weight	Arm length	Hand span	40-yard dash	10-yard split	20-yard split	20-yard shuttle	Three-cone drill	Vertical jump	Broad jump
6 ft 2 1/4 in (1.89 m)	192 lb (87 kg)	33 1/2 in (0.85 m)	10 in (0.25 m)	4.50 s	1.62 s	2.59 s	4.19 s	7.22 s	41.5 in (1.05 m)	10 ft 7 in (3.23 m)
All values from Pro Day

=== Arizona Cardinals ===
Matthew was selected by the Arizona Cardinals in the seventh round (244th overall) of the 2022 NFL draft. He was released on October 2, 2023.

=== Chicago Bears ===
On October 3, 2023, Matthew was signed to the practice squad of the Chicago Bears. He was not signed to a reserve/future contract after the season and thus became a free agent.

=== Baltimore Ravens ===
On January 16, 2024, Matthew was signed to the practice squad of the Baltimore Ravens. He signed a reserve/future contract on January 29. He was placed on injured reserve on August 27.

On March 7, 2025, it was announced that the Ravens declined to tender Matthew, effectively making him a free agent.

=== Dallas Cowboys ===
On July 29, 2025, Matthew signed with the Dallas Cowboys. He was waived/injured on August 25.

=== Orlando Storm ===
On January 14, 2026, Matthew was selected by the Orlando Storm in the 2026 UFL Draft. He was released on March 19.

=== Rhein Fire ===
On March 29, 2026, Matthew signed with the Rhein Fire of the American Football League Europe (AFLE).

=== Ottawa Redblacks ===
On August 3, 2026, Matthew signed with the Ottawa Redblacks of the Canadian Football League (CFL). On September 28, he was released.
