= Zaven Collins =

American football player (born 1999)

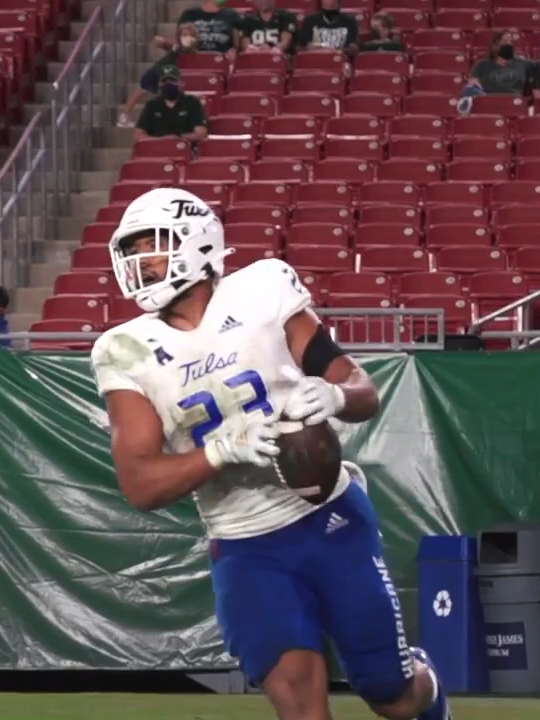
- Collins with the Tulsa Golden Hurricane in 2020

No. 25 – Arizona Cardinals
- Position: Outside linebacker
- Roster status: Active

Personal information
- Born: May 19, 1999 (age 27); Tulsa, Oklahoma, U.S.
- Listed height: 6 ft 4 in (1.93 m)
- Listed weight: 270 lb (122 kg)

Career information
- High school: Hominy (Hominy, Oklahoma)
- College: Tulsa (2017–2020)
- NFL draft: 2021: 1st round, 16th overall pick

Career history
- Arizona Cardinals (2021–present)

Awards and highlights
- Bronko Nagurski Trophy (2020); Chuck Bednarik Award (2020); Lombardi Award (2020); Unanimous All-American (2020); AAC Defensive Player of the Year (2020); First-team All-AAC (2020); Second-team All-AAC (2019)

Career NFL statistics as of Week 5, 2026
- Total tackles: 279
- Sacks: 13
- Pass deflections: 15
- Interceptions: 2
- Forced fumbles: 4
- Fumble recoveries: 5
- Defensive touchdowns: 2
- Stats at Pro Football Reference

Zaven Collins (born May 19, 1999) is an American professional football outside linebacker for the Arizona Cardinals of the National Football League (NFL). He played college football for the Tulsa Golden Hurricane, earning unanimous All-American honors and winning several defensive player of the year awards in 2020. Collins was selected by the Cardinals in the first round of the 2021 NFL draft.

== Early life ==
Collins was born in Tulsa, Oklahoma, on May 19, 1999, and later attended Hominy High School in Hominy, Oklahoma. He played quarterback, linebacker and safety in high school. During his career, he had 4,084 rushing yards with 54 touchdowns and passed for 3,056 yards and 32 touchdowns. He committed to the University of Tulsa to play college football.

== College career ==
After redshirting his first year at Tulsa in 2017, Collins played in 12 games and started 10 in 2018. He had 85 tackles, 1.5 sacks and one interception. As a sophomore in 2019, he started all 12 games, recording 97 tackles and two sacks. Collins returned to Tulsa in 2020, where he was awarded the Bronko Nagurski Trophy and Chuck Bednarik Award as the nation's best defensive player, as well as the Lombardi Award.

== Professional career ==
Pre-draft measurables
Height	Weight	Arm length	Hand span	Wingspan	40-yard dash	10-yard split	20-yard split	20-yard shuttle	Vertical jump	Broad jump	Bench press
6 ft 4 7/8 in (1.95 m)	259 lb (117 kg)	33 5/8 in (0.85 m)	9 3/8 in (0.24 m)	6 ft 8 3/8 in (2.04 m)	4.65 s	1.63 s	2.78 s	4.36 s	35 in (0.89 m)	10 ft 2 in (3.10 m)	19 reps
All values from Pro Day

Collins was selected by the Arizona Cardinals in the first round (16th overall) of the 2021 NFL draft. He signed his four-year rookie contract, worth $14 million, on June 8, 2021.

Collins entered his rookie season in 2021 as a starting inside linebacker alongside Jordan Hicks and Isaiah Simmons. He was relegated to a backup role midway through the season, playing the third-most snaps of the inside linebackers. He finished the season with 25 tackles and three passes defensed through 17 games and six starts.

In Week 9 of the 2022 season, Collins had a 30-yard interception returned for a touchdown against the Seattle Seahawks. In the 2022 season, he appeared in 16 games and finished with 100 total tackles (63 solo), one interception, six passes defended, and one forced fumble.

In the 2023 season, Collins finished with 3.5 sacks, 41 tackles, one interception, and three passes defended. On April 30, 2024, the Cardinals declined the fifth-year option on Collins' contract, making him a free agent after the 2024 season. On August 3, 2024, Collins and the Cardinals agreed to a two–year, $14 million contract extension. In the 2024 season, Collins finished with five sacks, 57 tackles, and one pass defended.

== Career statistics ==
=== NFL ===
Legend
**Bold**	Career high

==== Regular season ====
Year	Team	Games		Tackles						Interceptions						Fumbles			
Year	Team	GP	GS	Cmb	Solo	Ast	Sck	TFL	Sfty	PD	Int	Yds	Avg	Lng	TD	FF	FR	Yds	TD
2021	ARI	17	6	25	13	12	0.0	1	0	3	0	0	0.0	0	0	0	0	0	0
2022	ARI	16	16	**100**	**63**	**37**	2.0	**11**	0	**6**	**1**	**30**	**30.0**	**30**	**1**	1	0	0	0
2023	ARI	17	17	41	27	14	3.5	6	0	3	**1**	1	1.0	1	0	0	1	0	0
2024	ARI	17	17	57	33	24	**5.0**	7	0	1	0	0	0.0	0	0	**2**	0	0	0
2025	ARI	17	9	40	26	14	1.5	6	0	0	0	0	0.0	0	0	0	**2**	**3**	**1**
2026	ARI	5	2	16	10	6	1.0	2	0	2	0	0	0.0	0	0	1	**2**	0	0
Career		89	67	279	172	107	13.0	33	0	15	2	31	15.5	30	1	4	5	3	1

==== Postseason ====
Year	Team	Games		Tackles						Interceptions						Fumbles			
Year	Team	GP	GS	Cmb	Solo	Ast	Sck	TFL	Sfty	PD	Int	Yds	Avg	Lng	TD	FF	FR	Yds	TD
2021	ARI	1	1	2	1	1	0.0	0	0	0	0	0	0.0	0	0	0	0	0	0
Career		1	1	2	1	1	0.0	0	0	0	0	0	0.0	0	0	0	0	0	0

=== College ===
Year	Team	Games		Tackles				Interceptions				Fumbles		
Year	Team	GP	GS	Total	Solo	Ast	Sack	PD	Int	Yds	TD	FF	FR	TD
2017	Tulsa	0	0	DNP										
2018	Tulsa	12	10	85	42	43	1.5	3	1	0	0	1	1	0
2019	Tulsa	12	12	97	51	46	2.0	3	0	0	0	0	1	0
2020	Tulsa	8	8	53	35	18	4.0	2	4	152	2	1	1	0
Career		32	30	235	128	107	7.5	8	5	152	2	2	3	0

== Personal life ==
Collins was arrested in Arizona for speeding and reckless driving in June 2021; he was released from custody within an hour.
