= Steve Keim =

American football player and executive (born 1972)

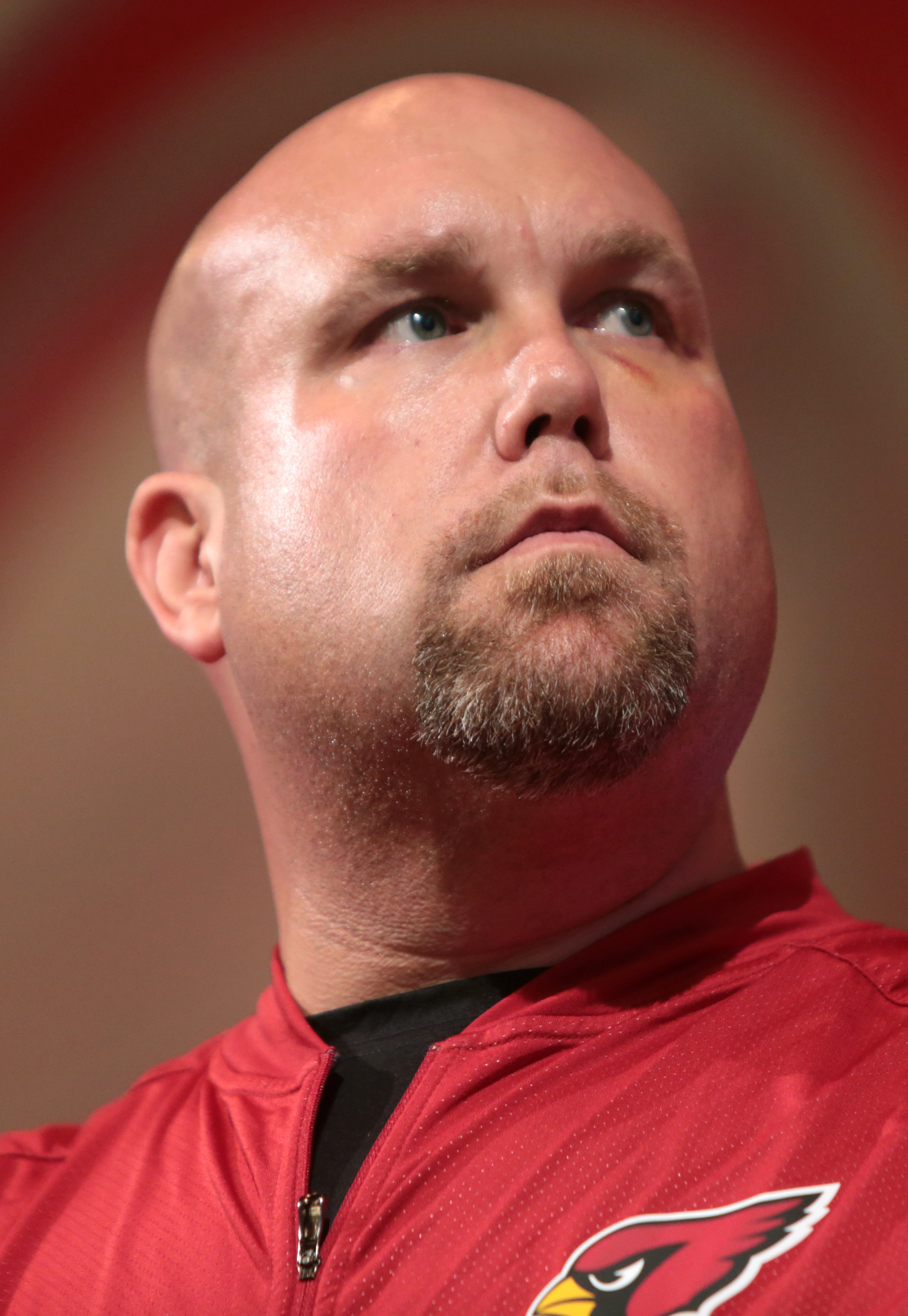
- Keim with the Arizona Cardinals in 2016

Profile
- Title: Offensive guard

Personal information
- Born: September 8, 1972 (age 54); Harrisburg, Pennsylvania, U.S.

Career information
- High school: Red Land
- College: NC State (1991–1995)

Career history

Playing
- Miami Dolphins (1996); Edmonton Eskimos (1997)

Operations
- Arizona Cardinals (1999–2022); Regional scout (1999–2005); Director of college scouting (2006–2007); Director of player personnel (2008–2011); Vice president of player personnel (2012); General manager (2013–2022)

Awards and highlights
- 2× Second-team All-ACC (1994, 1995); Sporting News Executive of the Year (2014)
- Executive profile at Pro Football Reference

Steve Keim (born September 8, 1972) is an American football executive and former player. He is currently the general manager of the sports agency Klutch Sports Group, whose agents represent professional athletes in contract negotiations. He spent over two decades as an executive with the Arizona Cardinals of the National Football League (NFL), most notably as their general manager from 2013-2022. He played college football as an offensive guard at NC State and was briefly a member of the NFL's Miami Dolphins and CFL in the mid-1990s.

After failing to find success as professional football player, Keim became a regional scout with the Cardinals in 1999. After being promoted several times, he was eventually named the team's general manager in 2013, a role he held through the conclusion of the 2022 season. Citing health concerns, Keim resigned from the Cardinals in January 2023.

== Playing career ==
=== College ===
Keim played for NC State, where he started 36 consecutive games at left guard. He was a two-time all-Atlantic Coast Conference selection and was named the conference's offensive freshman of the year in 1991. During Keim's senior year, he was named captain and the N.C. State offensive line MVP. He subsequently earned a degree in Business Management.

=== Professional ===
Keim signed with the Miami Dolphins (NFL) in 1996 and Edmonton Eskimos (CFL) in 1997.

== Executive career ==
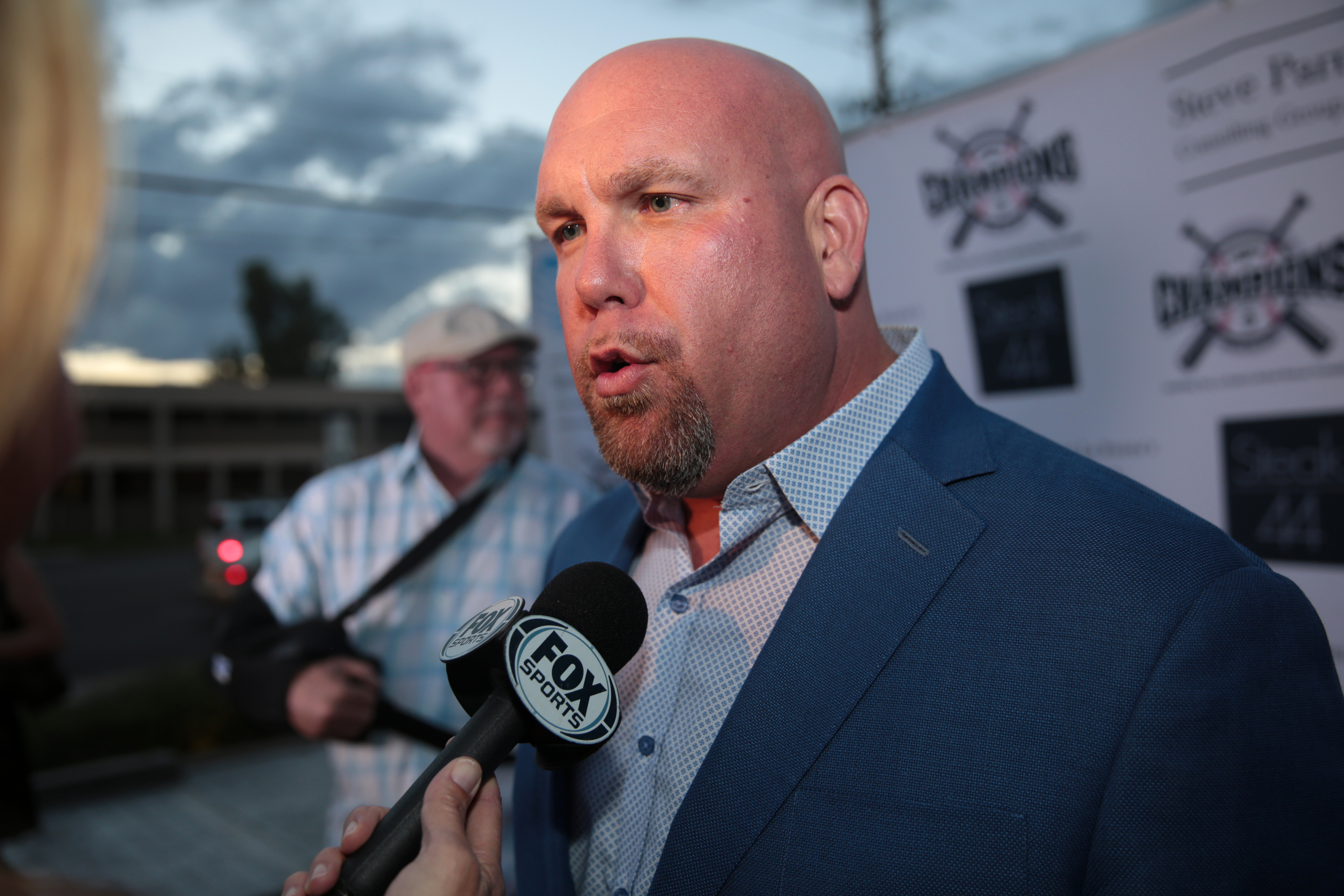
Keim at a fundraiser in Phoenix, Arizona

Keim originally joined the Arizona Cardinals in May 1999 as a college scout for the Eastern United States. He was promoted to director of college scouting in 2006 and later to director of player personnel in 2008. In May 2012, Keim was promoted to vice president of player personnel before being named general manager on January 8, 2013.

For the 2013 season, Keim was selected as Pro Football Talk's NFL Executive of the Year.

For the 2014 season, Keim was selected as NFL Executive of the Year by The Sporting News and a second year by Pro Football Talk.

On February 23, 2015, the Cardinals announced a new 4-year deal with Keim which would keep him with the Cardinals through the 2018 season.

On February 12, 2018, the Cardinals announced that Keim signed a contract extension with them through the 2022 season.

On March 2, 2022, the Cardinals announced that Keim signed a contract extension with them through the 2027 season. On December 14, the Cardinals announced Keim would be taking an indefinite leave of absence from the team. On January 9, 2023, Keim stepped down as general manager to focus on his health. Keim's total regular season record with the Cardinals was 80-80-2.

On September 19, 2024, Keim was hired as the general manager of Klutch Sports Group, a sports agency representing a variety of star football and basketball players as LeBron James, Myles Garrett, and Jalen Hurts.

== Personal life ==
Keim resides in Chandler, Arizona. Keim has a daughter, Sloane, and three sons: Carson, Brady and Warner. Keim is a native of Harrisburg, Pennsylvania and is of German descent.

On July 4, 2018, Keim was cited for driving under the influence after reportedly having a 0.19% blood-alcohol concentration. Keim subsequently pleaded guilty, with the Cardinals fining him $200,000 and suspending him for five weeks.

Keims was the former COO of an e-commerce firm, Motion Ventures, that allegedly defrauded investors out of their funds. Keims claims he is also a financial victim and was defrauded by the now deceased founder of the business, Mohamed Coulibaly.

== Awards and honors ==
Keim was inducted into the Pennsylvania Sports Hall of Fame in 2004.
