= 2021 Arizona Cardinals season =

102nd season in franchise history

- Owner: Michael Bidwill
- General manager: Steve Keim
- Head coach: Kliff Kingsbury (Note: Vance Joseph and Jeff Rodgers (Interim HCs for Week 6 after Kingsbury tested positive for COVID-19))
- Defensive coordinator: Vance Joseph
- Home stadium: State Farm Stadium

Results
- Record: 11–6
- Division place: 2nd NFC West
- Playoffs: Lost Wild Card Playoffs (at Rams) 11–34
- All-Pros: SS Budda Baker (2nd team)
- Pro Bowlers: 5: QB Kyler Murray; RB James Conner; T D. J. Humphries; OLB Chandler Jones; SS Budda Baker

Uniform
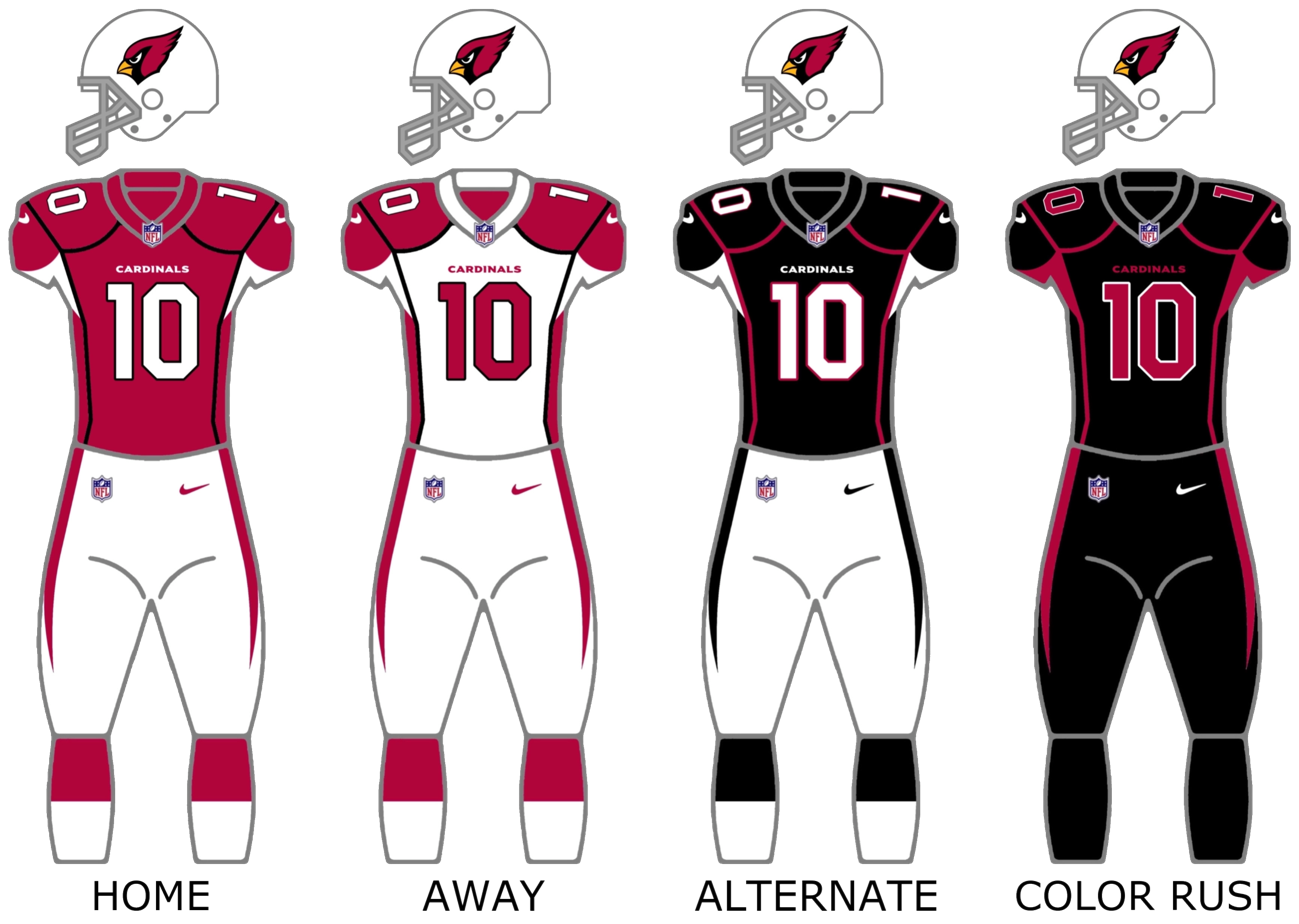

The 2021 season was the Arizona Cardinals' 102nd season in the National Football League (NFL), their 34th in Arizona and their third under head coach Kliff Kingsbury. The Cardinals started 7–0 for the first time in 47 years when they were based in St. Louis. They improved from their 8–8 season from the previous year with a 23–13 victory over the Seattle Seahawks in Week 11 and clinched their first winning season since 2015. Despite a loss to the Indianapolis Colts in Week 16, the Cardinals clinched a playoff berth for the first time since 2015 after the Minnesota Vikings lost to the Los Angeles Rams.

Despite an impressive 7–0 start and acquiring All-Pros J. J. Watt and A. J. Green prior to the season starting, the team suffered their second consecutive late-season collapse, only winning four out of their last ten games, resulting in them losing their lead in the division and dropping to the fifth seed. Their late season woes continued into the playoffs, where they would be eliminated in the Wild Card Round by their division rival and eventual Super Bowl champion Los Angeles Rams by a blowout score of 34–11.

In the offseason, cornerback Patrick Peterson left in free agency after 10 years, and wide receiver Larry Fitzgerald chose not to sign with any team after 17 years with the franchise.

== Roster changes ==
Position	Player	Tag	2021 team	Contract
TE	Dan Arnold	UFA	Carolina Panthers	2–year
S	Chris Banjo	UFA	Arizona Cardinals	1–year
OT	Kelvin Beachum	UFA	Arizona Cardinals	2–year
DE	Angelo Blackson	UFA	Chicago Bears	2–year
LB	De'Vondre Campbell	UFA	Green Bay Packers	1–year
TE	Darrell Daniels	UFA	Arizona Cardinals	1-year
TE	Seth DeValve	UFA	N/A	N/A
RB	Kenyan Drake	UFA	Las Vegas Raiders	2–year
LB	Kylie Fitts	ERFA	Arizona Cardinals	1–year
WR	Larry Fitzgerald	UFA	N/A	N/A
RB	D. J. Foster	UFA	N/A	N/A
OG	Max Garcia	UFA	Arizona Cardinals	1–year
LB	Dennis Gardeck	RFA	Arizona Cardinals	1–year
LB	Markus Golden	UFA	Arizona Cardinals	2–year
QB	Brett Hundley	UFA	Indianapolis Colts	1–year
LB	Isaiah Irving	UFA	N/A	N/A
CB	Johnathan Joseph	UFA	N/A	N/A
CB	Dre Kirkpatrick	UFA	San Francisco 49ers	1–year
P	Andy Lee	UFA	Arizona Cardinals	1–year
K	Mike Nugent	UFA	N/A	N/A
DT	Domata Peko	UFA	N/A	N/A
DT	Corey Peters	UFA	Arizona Cardinals	1–year
CB	Patrick Peterson	UFA	Minnesota Vikings	1–year
CB	Kevin Peterson	UFA	N/A	N/A
LB	Haason Reddick	UFA	Carolina Panthers	1–year
WR	Trent Sherfield	UFA	San Francisco 49ers	1–year
OG	J.R. Sweezy	UFA	N/A	N/A
LB	Ezekiel Turner	RFA	Arizona Cardinals	1–year
LB	Tanner Vallejo	UFA	Arizona Cardinals	2–year
S	Charles Washington	UFA	Arizona Cardinals	1-year

Player re-signed by the Cardinals	Player not re-signed by the Cardinals

=== Signings ===
Position	Player	Tag	2020 team	Date signed	Contract
WR	A. J. Green	UFA	Cincinnati Bengals	March 17	1–year, $8.5 million
K	Matt Prater	UFA	Detroit Lions	March 17	2–year, $6.5 million
DE	J. J. Watt	UFA	Houston Texans	March 17	2–year, $28 million
OG	Brian Winters	UFA	Buffalo Bills	March 22	1–year, $1 million
CB	Malcolm Butler	UFA	Tennessee Titans	March 25	1–year, $6 million
S	Shawn Williams	UFA	Cincinnati Bengals	March 29	1–year
QB	Colt McCoy	UFA	New York Giants	March 30	1–year
RB	James Conner	UFA	Pittsburgh Steelers	April 13	1-year

=== Trades ===
- March 17: The Cardinals traded a third–round pick in 2021 NFL draft to the Las Vegas Raiders for C Rodney Hudson.
- March 25: The Cardinals traded C Mason Cole to the Minnesota Vikings for a sixth–round pick in the 2021 NFL Draft.
- October 15: The Cardinals traded a fifth-round pick in 2022 NFL draft and CB Tay Gowan to the Philadelphia Eagles for Tight end Zach Ertz.

=== Draft ===
2021 Arizona Cardinals Draft
Round	Selection	Player	Position	College	Notes
1	16	Zaven Collins	LB	Tulsa	
2	49	Rondale Moore	WR	Purdue	
4	136	Marco Wilson	CB	Florida	from Kansas City via Baltimore
6	210	Victor Dimukeje	DE	Duke	from Baltimore
6	223	Tay Gowan	CB	UCF	from Minnesota via trade for Mason Cole
7	243	James Wiggins	S	Cincinnati	
7	247	Michal Menet	C	Penn State	from Chicago via Las Vegas

Notes

- The Cardinals traded their third-round selection to the Las Vegas Raiders in exchange for the Raiders' seventh-round selection, originally from the Chicago Bears, and center Rodney Hudson.
- The Cardinals traded their 2020 second-round selection, their 2021 fourth-round selection, and running back David Johnson to the Houston Texans in exchange for wide receiver DeAndre Hopkins and the Texans' 2020 fourth-round selection.
- The Cardinals traded their fifth-round pick and a 2022 fourth-round selection to the Baltimore Ravens in exchange for a fourth-round pick and a sixth-round pick.
- The Cardinals traded their sixth-round selection to the New York Giants in exchange for linebacker Markus Golden.

== Staff ==
2021 Arizona Cardinals staff
Front office: Owner – Michael Bidwill; Chairman/president – Michael Bidwill; General manager – Steve Keim; Vice president of player personnel – Quentin Harris; Vice president of pro scouting – Adrian Wilson; Vice president of football operations & facilities – Matt Caracciolo; Director of player personnel – Dru Grigson; Director of college scouting – Chris Culmer; Director of football administration – Matt Harriss; Head coaches: Head coach – Kliff Kingsbury; Assistant head coach/special teams coordinator – Jeff Rodgers; Offensive coaches: Quarterbacks – Cameron Turner; Running backs – James Saxon; Wide receivers – Shawn Jefferson; Assistant wide receivers – Spencer Whipple; Tight ends – Steve Heiden; Run game coordinator/offensive line – Sean Kugler; Assistant offensive line – Brian Natkin; Offensive assistant – Jerry Sullivan and Don Shumpert; Offensive quality control – Jim Dray	Defensive coaches: Defensive coordinator – Vance Joseph; Defensive line – Brentson Buckner; Linebackers – Billy Davis; Outside linebackers – Charlie Bullen; Defensive backs – Marcus Robertson; Cornerbacks – Greg Williams; Defensive assistant – Rusty McKinney; Defensive quality control – Rob Grosso; Special teams coaches: Assistant special teams – Devin Fitzsimmons; Strength and conditioning: Strength and conditioning – Buddy Morris; Assistant strength and conditioning – Mark Naylor

== Final roster ==
2021 Arizona Cardinals roster
Quarterbacks (QB): 12 Colt McCoy; 19 Trace McSorley; 1 Kyler Murray; Running backs (RB): 26 Eno Benjamin; 6 James Conner; 2 Chase Edmonds; 29 Jonathan Ward; Wide receivers (WR): 83 Greg Dortch; 18 A. J. Green; 17 Andy Isabella; 13 Christian Kirk; 4 Rondale Moore; 85 Antoine Wesley; Tight ends (TE): 81 Darrell Daniels; 86 Zach Ertz; 84 Demetrius Harris	Offensive linemen (OL): 68 Kelvin Beachum T; 73 Max Garcia G/C; 64 Sean Harlow G/C; 53 Marcus Henry C/G; 61 Rodney Hudson C; 74 D. J. Humphries T; 79 Josh Jones G/T; 66 Joshua Miles T; 67 Justin Pugh G; Defensive linemen (DL): 94 Zach Allen DE; 91 Michael Dogbe DE; 95 Leki Fotu DE; 92 Zach Kerr NT; 90 Rashard Lawrence NT; 98 Corey Peters NT; 97 Jordan Phillips DE; 99 J. J. Watt DE	Linebackers (LB): 25 Zaven Collins ILB; 52 Victor Dimukeje OLB; 45 Dennis Gardeck OLB; 44 Markus Golden OLB; 58 Jordan Hicks ILB; 55 Chandler Jones OLB; 42 Devon Kennard OLB; 9 Isaiah Simmons ILB; 47 Ezekiel Turner ILB; 51 Tanner Vallejo ILB; Defensive backs (DB): 3 Budda Baker FS; 31 Chris Banjo FS; 33 Antonio Hamilton CB; 7 Byron Murphy CB; 27 Kevin Peterson CB; 22 Deionte Thompson SS; 34 Jalen Thompson SS; 28 Charles Washington FS; 20 Marco Wilson CB; Special teams (ST): 46 Aaron Brewer LS; 14 Andy Lee P; 5 Matt Prater K	Practice squad: 82 Andre Baccellia WR; 24 Bashaud Breeland CB; 37 Nate Brooks SS; 36 Alex Ellis TE; 30 Tavien Feaster RB; 34 Javon Hagan FS; 63 Danny Isidora G; 93 Jonathan Ledbetter DE; 60 Koda Martin G; 96 Josh Mauro DE; 80 Bernhard Seikovits TE (IPP); 72 Eric Smith T; 59 Joe Walker ILB; 41 David Wells TE; 39 Jace Whittaker CB; Reserve: 23 Robert Alford CB (IR); 69 Jack Crawford DE (IR); 49 Kylie Fitts OLB (IR); 10 DeAndre Hopkins WR (IR); 71 Justin Murray G (IR); 38 James Wiggins FS (IR); 87 Maxx Williams TE (IR); Rookies in italics 55 active, 13 reserve, 15 practice squad

== Preseason ==
The Cardinals' preseason schedule was announced on May 12.

Week	Date	Opponent	Result	Record	Venue	Recap
1	August 13	Dallas Cowboys	W 19–16	1–0	State Farm Stadium	Recap
2	August 20	Kansas City Chiefs	L 10–17	1–1	State Farm Stadium	Recap
3	August 28	at New Orleans Saints	Cancelled due to Hurricane Ida			

== Regular season ==
=== Schedule ===
The Cardinals' 2021 schedule was announced on May 12.

Week	Date	Opponent	Result	Record	Venue	Recap
1	September 12	at Tennessee Titans	**W** 38–13	1–0	Nissan Stadium	Recap
2	September 19	Minnesota Vikings	**W** 34–33	2–0	State Farm Stadium	Recap
3	September 26	at Jacksonville Jaguars	**W** 31–19	3–0	TIAA Bank Field	Recap
4	October 3	at **Los Angeles Rams**	**W** 37–20	4–0	SoFi Stadium	Recap
5	October 10	**San Francisco 49ers**	**W** 17–10	5–0	State Farm Stadium	Recap
6	October 17	at Cleveland Browns	**W** 37–14	6–0	FirstEnergy Stadium	Recap
7	October 24	Houston Texans	**W** 31−5	7–0	State Farm Stadium	Recap
8	October 28	Green Bay Packers	**L** 21–24	7–1	State Farm Stadium	Recap
9	November 7	at **San Francisco 49ers**	**W** 31–17	8–1	Levi's Stadium	Recap
10	November 14	Carolina Panthers	**L** 10–34	8–2	State Farm Stadium	Recap
11	November 21	at **Seattle Seahawks**	**W** 23–13	9–2	Lumen Field	Recap
12	Bye					
13	December 5	at Chicago Bears	**W** 33–22	10–2	Soldier Field	Recap
14	December 13	**Los Angeles Rams**	**L** 23–30	10–3	State Farm Stadium	Recap
15	December 19	at Detroit Lions	**L** 12–30	10–4	Ford Field	Recap
16	December 25	Indianapolis Colts	**L** 16–22	10–5	State Farm Stadium	Recap
17	January 2	at Dallas Cowboys	**W** 25–22	11–5	AT&T Stadium	Recap
18	January 9	**Seattle Seahawks**	**L** 30–38	11–6	State Farm Stadium	Recap

Note: Intra-division opponents are in bold text.

=== Game summaries ===
==== Week 1: at Tennessee Titans ====
Week 1: Arizona Cardinals at Tennessee Titans – Game summary

Quarter	1	2	3	4	Total
**Cardinals**	10	14	14	0	**38**
Titans	0	6	7	0	**13**

at Nissan Stadium, Nashville, Tennessee

- Date: September 12
- Game time: 12:00 p.m. CDT/10:00 a.m. MST
- Game weather: Sunny, 78 °F (26 °C)
- Game attendance: 67,216
- Referee: Jerome Boger
- TV announcers (CBS): Tom McCarthy and Aaron Taylor
- Recap, Game Book

Game information

**First quarter**

- ARI – Matt Prater 34-yard field goal, 9:26. Cardinals 3–0. **Drive: 8 plays, 45 yards, 4:05.**
- ARI – DeAndre Hopkins 5-yard pass from Kyler Murray (Matt Prater kick), 8:18. Cardinals 10–0. **Drive: 3 plays, 1 yards, 0:19.**

**Second quarter**

- ARI – DeAndre Hopkins 17-yard pass from Kyler Murray (Matt Prater kick), 11:03. Cardinals 17–0. **Drive: 9 plays, 70 yards, 4:32.**
- TEN – Ryan Tannehill 1-yard run (kick failed), 6:54. Cardinals 17–6. **Drive: 11 plays, 75 yards, 4:09.**
- ARI – Kyler Murray 2-yard run (Matt Prater kick), 1:49. Cardinals 24–6. **Drive: 12 plays, 75 yards, 5:06.**

**Third quarter**

- TEN – A. J. Brown 13-yard pass from Ryan Tannehill (Michael Badgley kick), 12:59. Cardinals 24–13. **Drive: 2 plays, 32 yards, 0:47.**
- ARI – Christian Kirk 26-yard pass from Kyler Murray (Matt Prater kick), 10:45. Cardinals 31–13. **Drive: 6 plays, 75 yards, 2:15.**
- ARI – Christian Kirk 11-yard pass from Kyler Murray (Matt Prater kick), 3:11. Cardinals 38–13. **Drive: 4 plays, 33 yards, 2:12.**

**Fourth quarter**

- No scoring plays.

**Top passers**

- ARI – Kyler Murray – 21/32, 289 yards, 4 TD, INT
- TEN – Ryan Tannehill – 21/35, 212 yards, TD, INT

**Top rushers**

- ARI – Chase Edmonds – 12 rushes, 63 yards
- TEN – Derrick Henry – 17 rushes, 58 yards

**Top receivers**

- ARI – DeAndre Hopkins – 6 receptions, 83 yards, 2 TD
- TEN – Chester Rogers – 4 reception, 62 yards

==== Week 2: vs. Minnesota Vikings ====
Week 2: Minnesota Vikings at Arizona Cardinals – Game summary

Quarter	1	2	3	4	Total
Vikings	14	9	7	3	**33**
**Cardinals**	7	17	7	3	**34**

at State Farm Stadium, Glendale, Arizona

- Date: September 19
- Game time: 1:05 p.m. MST
- Game weather: None (retractable roof closed)
- Game attendance: 60,115
- Referee: Bill Vinovich
- TV announcers (Fox): Gus Johnson, Aqib Talib and Megan Olivi
- Recap, Game Book

Game information

**First quarter**

- MIN – K. J. Osborn 64-yard pass from Kirk Cousins (Greg Joseph kick), 14:16. Vikings 7–0. **Drive: 2 plays, 75 yards, 0:44.**
- ARI – DeAndre Hopkins 15-yard pass from Kyler Murray (Matt Prater kick), 5:49. Tied 7–7. **Drive: 9 plays, 73 yards, 4:36.**
- MIN – Adam Thielen 7-yard pass from Kirk Cousins (Greg Joseph kick), 0:24. Vikings 14–7. **Drive: 9 plays, 75 yards, 5:25.**

**Second quarter**

- MIN – Justin Jefferson 14-yard pass from Kirk Cousins (kick failed, wide right), 8:56. Vikings 20–7. **Drive: 9 plays, 84 yards, 5:18.**
- ARI – Kyler Murray 12-yard run (Matt Prater kick), 3:15. Vikings 20–14. **Drive: 10 plays, 75 yards, 5:41.**
- ARI – Rondale Moore 77-yard pass from Kyler Murray (Matt Prater kick), 1:33. Cardinals 21–20. **Drive: 1 play, 77 yards, 0:13.**
- MIN – Greg Joseph 52-yard field goal, 0:21. Vikings 23–21. **Drive: 8 plays, 41 yards, 1:12.**
- ARI – Matt Prater 62-yard field goal, 0:00. Cardinals 24–23. **Drive: 3 plays, 22 yards, 0:21.**

**Third quarter**

- MIN – Nick Vigil 36-yard interception return (Greg Joseph kick), 14:00. Vikings 30–24.
- ARI – A. J. Green 9-yard pass from Kyler Murray (Matt Prater kick), 9:11. Cardinals 31–30. **Drive: 8 plays, 75 yards, 4:49.**

**Fourth quarter**

- MIN – Greg Joseph 52-yard field goal, 14:12. Vikings 33–31. **Drive: 10 plays, 35 yards, 4:17.**
- ARI – Matt Prater 27-yard field goal, 4:25. Cardinals 34–33. **Drive: 10 plays, 55 yards, 4:26.**

**Top passers**

- MIN – Kirk Cousins – 22/32, 244 yards, 3 TD
- ARI – Kyler Murray – 29/36, 400 yards, 3 TD, 2 INT

**Top rushers**

- MIN – Dalvin Cook – 22 rushes, 131 yards
- ARI – Chase Edmonds – 8 rushes, 46 yards

**Top receivers**

- MIN – K. J. Osborn – 5 reception, 91 yards, TD
- ARI – Rondale Moore – 7 receptions, 114 yards, TD

==== Week 3: at Jacksonville Jaguars ====
Week 3: Arizona Cardinals at Jacksonville Jaguars – Game summary

Quarter	1	2	3	4	Total
**Cardinals**	7	0	17	7	**31**
Jaguars	0	13	6	0	**19**

at TIAA Bank Field, Jacksonville, Florida

- Date: September 26
- Game time: 1:00 p.m. EDT/10:00 a.m. MST
- Game weather: Sunny, 80 °F (27 °C)
- Game attendance: 58,012
- Referee: Shawn Smith
- TV announcers (Fox): Gus Johnson, Aqib Talib and Megan Olivi
- Recap, Game Book

Game information

**First quarter**

- ARI – Kyler Murray 1-yard run (Matt Prater kick), 6:42. Cardinals 7–0. **Drive: 7 plays, 56 yards, 3:22.**

**Second quarter**

- JAX – D. J. Chark 12-yard pass from Trevor Lawrence (Josh Lambo kick), 0:21. Tied 7–7. **Drive: 9 plays, 74 yards, 3:01.**
- JAX – Jamal Agnew 109–yard kick return (kick failed, wide left), 0:00. Jaguars 13–7.

**Third quarter**

- ARI – Matt Prater 34-yard field goal, 7:38. Jaguars 13–10. **Drive: 12 plays, 68 yards, 4:47.**
- JAX – James Robinson 4-yard run (kick failed, wide right), 3:33. Jaguars 19–10. **Drive: 8 plays, 75 yards, 4:05.**
- ARI – James Conner 4-yard run (Matt Prater kick), 1:21. Jaguars 19–17. **Drive: 5 plays, 75 yards, 2:12.**
- ARI – Byron Murphy 29–yard interception return (Matt Prater kick), 0:24. Cardinals 24–19.

**Fourth quarter**

- ARI – James Conner 1-yard run (Matt Prater kick), 6:49. Cardinals 31–19. **Drive: 11 plays, 65 yards, 6:52.**

**Top passers**

- ARI – Kyler Murray – 28/34, 316 yards, INT
- JAX – Trevor Lawrence – 22/34, 219 yards, TD, 2 INT

**Top rushers**

- ARI – James Conner – 11 rushes, 43 yards, 2 TD
- JAX – James Robinson – 15 rushes, 88 yards, TD

**Top receivers**

- ARI – A. J. Green – 5 receptions, 112 yards
- JAX – Marvin Jones – 6 receptions, 62 yards

==== Week 4: at Los Angeles Rams ====
Week 4: Arizona Cardinals at Los Angeles Rams – Game summary

Quarter	1	2	3	4	Total
**Cardinals**	7	17	10	3	**37**
Rams	10	3	0	7	**20**

at SoFi Stadium, Inglewood, California

- Date: October 3
- Game time: 1:05 p.m. MST & PDT
- Game weather: Sunny, 89 °F (32 °C)
- Game attendance: 70,003
- Referee: Shawn Hochuli
- TV announcers (Fox): Chris Myers, Daryl Johnston and Jen Hale
- Recap, Game Book

Game information

**First quarter**

- LAR – Matt Gay 42-yard field goal, 11:18. Rams 3–0. **Drive: 9 plays, 52 yards, 3:42.**
- ARI – A. J. Green 41-yard pass from Kyler Murray (Matt Prater kick), 5:50. Cardinals 7–3. **Drive: 6 plays, 87 yards, 3:07.**
- LAR – Van Jefferson 14-yard pass from Matthew Stafford (Matt Gay kick), 0:52. Rams 10–7. **Drive: 9 plays, 75 yards, 4:58.**

**Second quarter**

- ARI – Maxx Williams 14-yard pass from Kyler Murray (Matt Prater kick), 10:44. Cardinals 14–10. **Drive: 11 plays, 75 yards, 5:08.**
- ARI – James Conner 1-yard run (Matt Prater kick), 8:44. Cardinals 21–10. **Drive: 5 plays, 21 yards, 1:51.**
- LAR – Matt Gay 22-yard field goal, 3:22. Cardinals 21–13. **Drive: 9 plays, 48 yards, 3:19.**
- ARI – Matt Prater 23-yard field goal, 0:04. Cardinals 24–13. **Drive: 17 plays, 70 yards, 3:18.**

**Third quarter**

- ARI – Matt Prater 55-yard field goal, 10:15. Cardinals 27–13. **Drive: 10 plays, 38 yards, 4:45.**
- ARI – James Conner 1-yard run (Matt Prater kick), 1:14. Cardinals 34–13. **Drive: 9 plays, 64 yards, 5:09.**

**Fourth quarter**

- ARI – Matt Prater 23-yard field goal, 3:38. Cardinals 37–13. **Drive: 12 plays, 94 yards, 8:27.**
- LAR – Robert Woods 14-yard pass from Matthew Stafford (Matt Gay kick), 1:14. Cardinals 37–20. **Drive: 9 plays, 75 yards, 2:24.**

**Top passers**

- ARI – Kyler Murray – 24/32, 268 yards, 2 TD
- LAR – Matthew Stafford – 26/41, 280 yards, 2 TD, INT

**Top rushers**

- ARI – Chase Edmonds – 12 rushes, 120 yards
- LAR – Darrell Henderson – 14 rushes, 89 yards

**Top receivers**

- ARI – A. J. Green – 5 receptions, 67 yards, TD
- LAR – Van Jefferson – 6 receptions, 90 yards, TD

With the win, the Cardinals not only improved to 4–0 for the first time since 2012, but earned their first victory over the Rams since Week 17 of the 2016 season. Also, with the Broncos, the Raiders, and the Panthers losing their first games of the season, the Cardinals became the last undefeated team in the NFL.

==== Week 5: vs. San Francisco 49ers ====
Week 5: San Francisco 49ers at Arizona Cardinals – Game summary

Quarter	1	2	3	4	Total
49ers	0	0	7	3	**10**
**Cardinals**	7	3	0	7	**17**

at State Farm Stadium, Glendale, Arizona

- Date: October 10
- Game time: 1:25 p.m. MST
- Game weather: None (retractable roof closed)
- Game attendance: 62,716
- Referee: Clay Martin
- TV announcers (Fox): Kevin Kugler, Mark Sanchez and Laura Okmin
- Recap, Game Book

Game information

**First quarter**

- ARI – James Conner 1-yard run (Matt Prater kick), 9:02. Cardinals 7–0. **Drive: 8 plays, 66 yards, 3:44.**

**Second quarter**

- ARI – Matt Prater 21-yard field goal, 5:27. Cardinals 10–0. **Drive: 14 plays, 96 yards, 5:59.**

**Third quarter**

- SF – Deebo Samuel 13-yard run, (Joey Slye kick) 1:42. Cardinals 10–7. **Drive: 6 plays, 59 yards, 3:28.**

**Fourth quarter**

- ARI – DeAndre Hopkins 9-yard pass from Kyler Murray, (Matt Prater kick) 5:13. Cardinals 17–7. **Drive: 5 plays, 52 yards, 2:36.**
- SF – Joey Slye 47-yard field goal, 4:12. Cardinals 17–10. **Drive: 6 plays, 46 yards, 1:01.**

**Top passers**

- SF – Trey Lance – 15/29, 192 yards, INT
- ARI – Kyler Murray – 22/31, 239 yards, TD

**Top rushers**

- SF – Trey Lance – 16 rushes, 89 yards
- ARI – Rondale Moore – 3 rushes, 38 yards

**Top receivers**

- SF – Deebo Samuel – 3 receptions, 58 yards
- ARI – DeAndre Hopkins – 6 receptions, 87 yards, TD

==== Week 6: at Cleveland Browns ====
Week 6: Arizona Cardinals at Cleveland Browns – Game summary

Quarter	1	2	3	4	Total
**Cardinals**	7	16	7	7	**37**
Browns	0	14	0	0	**14**

at FirstEnergy Stadium, Cleveland, Ohio

- Date: October 17
- Game time: 4:05 p.m. EDT/1:05 p.m. MST
- Game weather: Cloudy, 58 °F (14 °C)
- Game attendance: 67,431
- Referee: Carl Cheffers
- TV announcers (Fox): Kevin Kugler, Mark Sanchez and Laura Okmin
- Recap, Game Book

Game information

**First quarter**

- ARI – Christian Kirk 21-yard pass from Kyler Murray, (Matt Prater kick), 8:34. Cardinals 7–0. **Drive: 9 plays, 74 yards, 5:00.**

**Second quarter**

- ARI – DeAndre Hopkins 13-yard pass from Kyler Murray, (Matt Prater kick), 14:49. Cardinals 14–0. **Drive: 11 plays, 78 yards, 4:41.**
- ARI – Matt Prater 36-yard field goal, 13:02. Cardinals 17–0. **Drive: 4 plays, 0 yards, 0:51.**
- ARI – Matt Prater 51-yard field goal, 9:24. Cardinals 20–0. **Drive: 4 plays, -5 yards, 2:07.**
- CLE – Donovan Peoples-Jones 11-yard pass from Baker Mayfield, (Chase McLaughlin kick), 5:06. Cardinals 20–7. **Drive: 8 plays, 75 yards, 4:18.**
- ARI – Matt Prater 33-yard field goal, 0:43. Cardinals 23–7. **Drive: 12 plays, 56 yards, 4:23.**
- CLE – Donovan Peoples-Jones 57-yard pass from Baker Mayfield, (Chase McLaughlin kick), 0:00. Cardinals 23–14. **Drive: 5 plays, 75 yards, 0:43.**

**Third quarter**

- ARI – DeAndre Hopkins 9-yard pass from Kyler Murray, (Matt Prater kick), 2:56. Cardinals 30–14. **Drive: 8 plays, 54 yards, 3:30.**

**Fourth quarter**

- ARI – A. J. Green 14-yard pass from Kyler Murray, (Matt Prater kick), 4:48. Cardinals 37–14. **Drive: 11 plays, 93 yards, 7:18.**

**Top passers**

- ARI – Kyler Murray – 20/30, 229 yards, 4 TD
- CLE – Baker Mayfield – 19/28, 234 yards, 2 TD, INT

**Top rushers**

- ARI – James Connor – 16 rushes, 71 yards
- CLE – Kareem Hunt – 14 rushes, 66 yards

**Top receivers**

- ARI – A. J. Green – 5 receptions, 79 yards, TD
- CLE – Donovan Peoples-Jones – 4 receptions, 101 yards, 2 TD

The Cardinals started 6–0 for the first time since 1974.

==== Week 7: vs. Houston Texans ====
Week 7: Houston Texans at Arizona Cardinals – Game summary

Quarter	1	2	3	4	Total
Texans	2	3	0	0	**5**
**Cardinals**	0	17	7	7	**31**

at State Farm Stadium, Glendale, Arizona

- Date: October 24
- Game time: 1:25 p.m. MST
- Game weather: None (retractable roof closed)
- Game attendance: 60,297
- Referee: Land Clark
- TV announcers (CBS): Greg Gumbel, Adam Archuleta and AJ Ross
- Recap, Game Book

Game information

**First quarter**

- HOU – Kyler Murray sacked in the end zone by Jacob Martin for a safety, 2:58. Texans 2–0.

**Second quarter**

- HOU – Kaʻimi Fairbairn 53-yard field goal, 14:55. Texans 5–0. **Drive: 5 plays, 25 yards, 3:03.**
- ARI – DeAndre Hopkins 1-yard pass from Kyler Murray (Matt Prater kick), 9:01. Cardinals 7–5. **Drive: 14 plays, 75 yards, 5:54.**
- ARI – Christian Kirk 5-yard pass from Kyler Murray (Matt Prater kick), 2:45. Cardinals 14–5. **Drive: 6 plays, 49 yards, 2:58.**
- ARI – Matt Prater 31-yard field goal, 0:05. Cardinals 17–5. **Drive: 8 plays, 61 yards, 1:32.**

**Third quarter**

- ARI – Zach Ertz 47-yard pass from Kyler Murray (Matt Prater kick), 7:58. Cardinals 24–5. **Drive: 7 plays, 88 yards, 3:33.**

**Fourth quarter**

- ARI – James Conner 18-yard run (Matt Prater kick), 10:22. Cardinals 31–5. **Drive: 7 plays, 63 yards, 3:53.**

**Top passers**

- HOU – Davis Mills – 23/32, 135 yards
- ARI – Kyler Murray – 20/28, 261 yards, 3 TD, INT

**Top rushers**

- HOU – David Johnson – 7 rushes, 25 yards
- ARI – Chase Edmonds – 15 rushes, 81 yards

**Top receivers**

- HOU – Nico Collins – 2 receptions, 28 yards
- ARI – Zach Ertz – 3 receptions, 66 yards, TD

The Arizona Cardinals played the Houston Texans at home. This was the first game where former Texans DeAndre Hopkins and JJ Watt played against their former team, as well as tight end Zach Ertz's debut with the Cardinals.

==== Week 8: vs. Green Bay Packers ====
Week 8: Green Bay Packers at Arizona Cardinals – Game summary

Quarter	1	2	3	4	Total
**Packers**	0	10	7	7	**24**
Cardinals	7	0	7	7	**21**

at State Farm Stadium, Glendale, Arizona

- Date: October 28
- Game time: 5:20 p.m. MST
- Game weather: Sunny, 86 °F (30 °C) (retractable roof open)
- Game attendance: 63,696
- Referee: Alex Kemp
- TV announcers (Fox/NFLN/Prime Video): Joe Buck, Troy Aikman, Erin Andrews and Kristina Pink
- Recap, Game Book

Game information

**First quarter**

- ARI – Chase Edmonds 11-yard run (Matt Prater kick), 6:17. Cardinals 7–0. **Drive: 7 plays, 63 yards, 3:43.**

**Second quarter**

- GB – Aaron Jones 2-yard run (Mason Crosby kick), 12:54. Tied 7–7. **Drive: 14 plays, 75 yards, 8:23.**
- GB – Mason Crosby 21-yard field goal, 6:24. Packers 10–7. **Drive: 4 plays, 0 yards, 0:19.**

**Third quarter**

- GB – Randall Cobb 2-yard pass from Aaron Rodgers (Mason Crosby kick), 11:37. Packers 17–7. **Drive: 5 plays, 14 yards, 2:16.**
- ARI – James Conner 2-yard run (Matt Prater kick), 6:22. Packers 17–14. **Drive: 12 plays, 81 yards, 5:15.**

**Fourth quarter**

- GB – Randall Cobb 6-yard pass from Aaron Rodgers (Mason Crosby kick), 14:56. Packers 24–14. **Drive: 12 plays, 91 yards, 6:26.**
- ARI – James Conner 9-yard run (Matt Prater kick), 10:45. Packers 24–21. **Drive: 11 plays, 75 yards, 4:11.**

**Top passers**

- GB – Aaron Rodgers – 22/37, 184 yards, 2 TD
- ARI – Kyler Murray – 22/33, 274 yards, 2 INT

**Top rushers**

- GB – A. J. Dillon – 16 rushes, 78 yards
- ARI – Chase Edmonds – 7 rushes, 30 yards, TD

**Top receivers**

- GB – Aaron Jones – 7 receptions, 51 yards
- ARI – DeAndre Hopkins – 2 receptions, 66 yards

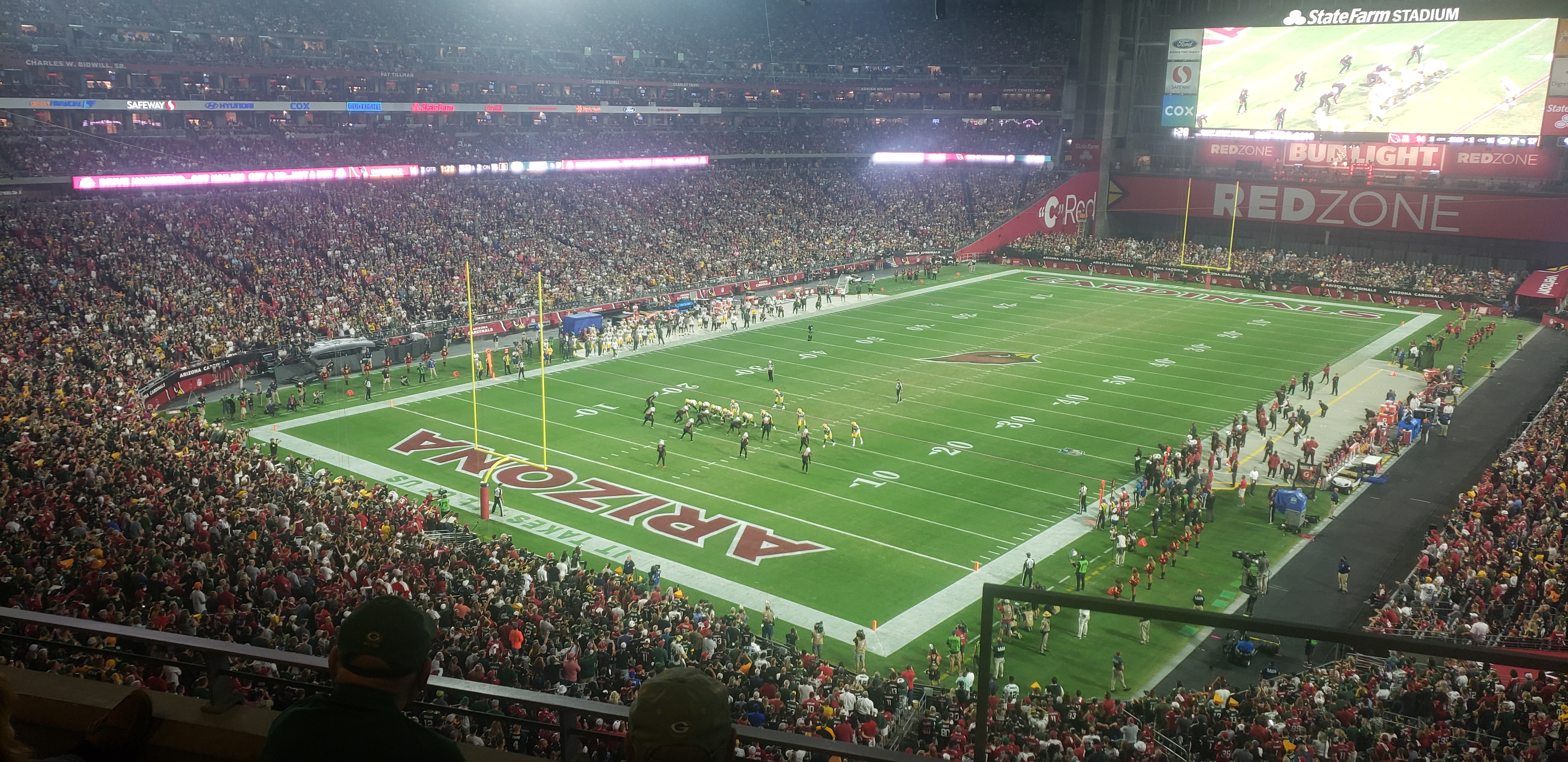
The Packers offense lining up against the Cardinals defense during the game.

The Packers handed the Cardinals their first loss to deny them a perfect season with a 24–21 victory on Thursday Night Football, despite entering the game without their top three wide receivers—Allen Lazard and All-Pro WR Davante Adams missed the game due to COVID protocols, while Marquez Valdes-Scantling was still recovering from a groin injury suffered in Week 3. Kyler Murray had the ball with time winding down, and the ball in field goal range, but a pass intended for wide receiver A. J. Green was picked off in the endzone by Packers cornerback Rasul Douglas, who began the season on the Cardinals practice squad.

==== Week 9: at San Francisco 49ers ====
Week 9: Arizona Cardinals at San Francisco 49ers – Game summary

Quarter	1	2	3	4	Total
**Cardinals**	14	3	14	0	**31**
49ers	0	7	7	3	**17**

at Levi's Stadium, Santa Clara, California

- Date: November 7
- Game time: 2:25 p.m. MST/1:25 p.m. PST
- Game weather: Scattered clouds, 62 °F (17 °C)
- Game attendance: 59,012
- Referee: Brad Allen
- TV announcers (Fox): Kevin Kugler, Mark Sanchez and Laura Okmin
- Recap, Game Book

Game information

**First quarter**

- ARI – James Conner 13-yard run (Matt Prater kick), 6:08. Cardinals 7–0. **Drive: 9 plays, 57 yards, 4:21.**
- ARI – James Conner 1-yard run (Matt Prater kick), 0:39. Cardinals 14–0. **Drive: 8 plays, 80 yards, 3:59.**

**Second quarter**

- ARI – Matt Prater 26-yard field goal, 4:02. Cardinals 17–0. **Drive: 14 plays, 85 yards, 8:23.**
- SF – George Kittle 6-yard pass from Jimmy Garoppolo (Robbie Gould kick), 0:16. Cardinals 17–7. **Drive: 9 plays, 75 yards, 3:46.**

**Third quarter**

- ARI – James Conner 45-yard pass from Colt McCoy (Matt Prater kick), 13:33. Cardinals 24–7. **Drive: 3 plays, 72 yards, 1:27.**
- ARI – Eno Benjamin 21-yard run (Matt Prater kick), 8:05. Cardinals 31–7. **Drive: 7 plays, 71 yards, 3:47.**
- SF – Brandon Aiyuk 11-yard pass from Jimmy Garoppolo (Robbie Gould kick), 4:56. Cardinals 31–14. **Drive: 6 plays, 75 yards, 3:09.**

**Fourth quarter**

- SF – Robbie Gould 26-yard field goal, 8:23. Cardinals 31–17. **Drive: 7 plays, 28 yards, 2:34.**

**Top passers**

- ARI – Colt McCoy – 22/26, 249 yards, TD
- SF – Jimmy Garoppolo – 28/40, 322 yards, 2 TD, INT

**Top rushers**

- ARI – James Conner – 21 rushes, 96 yards, 2 TD
- SF – Elijah Mitchell – 8 rushes, 36 yards

**Top receivers**

- ARI – Christian Kirk – 6 receptions, 91 yards
- SF – George Kittle – 6 receptions, 101 yards, TD

Despite Kyler Murray and DeAndre Hopkins not playing, the Cardinals dominated the game to sweep the season series for the first time since 2018.

==== Week 10: vs. Carolina Panthers ====
Week 10: Carolina Panthers at Arizona Cardinals – Game summary

Quarter	1	2	3	4	Total
**Panthers**	17	6	8	3	**34**
Cardinals	0	0	3	7	**10**

at State Farm Stadium, Glendale, Arizona

- Date: November 14
- Game time: 2:05 p.m. MST
- Game weather: None (retractable roof closed)
- Game attendance: 62,400
- Referee: Adrian Hill
- TV announcers (Fox): Kenny Albert, Jonathan Vilma and Sara Walsh
- Recap, Game Book

Game information

**First quarter**

- CAR – Cam Newton 2-yard run (Zane Gonzalez kick), 11:12. Panthers 7–0. **Drive: 5 plays, 15 yards, 2:22.**
- CAR – Robby Anderson 2-yard pass from Cam Newton (Zane Gonzalez kick), 8:39. Panthers 14–0. **Drive: 4 plays, 41 yards, 1:12.**
- CAR – Zane Gonzalez 44-yard field goal, 1:00. Panthers 17–0. **Drive: 9 plays, 40 yards, 5:25.**

**Second quarter**

- CAR – Zane Gonzalez 48-yard field goal, 9:40. Panthers 20–0. **Drive: 10 plays, 51 yards, 5:09.**
- CAR – Zane Gonzalez 49-yard field goal, 0:00. Panthers 23–0. **Drive: 12 plays, 53 yards, 3:16.**

**Third quarter**

- ARI – Matt Prater 47-yard field goal, 10:02. Panthers 23–3. **Drive: 7 plays, 46 yards, 2:45.**
- CAR – Chuba Hubbard 5-yard run (P. J. Walker–Terrace Marshall Jr. pass), 5:34. Panthers 31–3. **Drive: 8 plays, 75 yards, 4:28.**

**Fourth quarter**

- ARI – James Conner 11-yard run (Matt Prater kick), 9:19. Panthers 31–10. **Drive: 11 plays, 71 yards, 4:33.**
- CAR – Zane Gonzalez 27-yard field goal, 3:26. Panthers 34–10. **Drive: 10 plays, 36 yards, 5:53.**

**Top passers**

- CAR – P. J. Walker – 22/29, 167 yards, INT
- ARI – Colt McCoy – 11/20, 107 yards, INT

**Top rushers**

- CAR – Christian McCaffrey – 13 rushes, 95 yards
- ARI – James Conner – 10 rushes, 39 yards, TD

**Top receivers**

- CAR – Christian McCaffrey – 10 receptions, 66 yards
- ARI – Christian Kirk – 7 receptions, 58 yards

==== Week 11: at Seattle Seahawks ====
Week 11: Arizona Cardinals at Seattle Seahawks – Game summary

Quarter	1	2	3	4	Total
**Cardinals**	7	6	3	7	**23**
Seahawks	0	6	0	7	**13**

at Lumen Field, Seattle, Washington

- Date: November 21
- Game time: 2:25 p.m. MST/1:25 p.m. PST
- Game weather: Partly cloudy, 45 °F (7 °C)
- Game attendance: 68,833
- Referee: Clete Blakeman
- TV announcers (Fox): Kenny Albert, Jonathan Vilma and Sara Walsh
- Recap, Game Book

Game information

**First quarter**

- ARI – Zach Ertz 1-yard pass from Colt McCoy (Matt Prater kick), 2:47. Cardinals 7-0. **Drive: 16 plays, 82 yards, 9:27**

**Second quarter**

- SEA – Jason Myers 27-yard field goal, 8:23. Cardinals 7-3. **Drive: 7 plays, 36 yards, 2:05.**
- ARI – Zach Ertz 2-yard pass from Colt McCoy (kick failed, wide right), 1:52. Cardinals 13-3. **Drive: 13 plays, 92 yards, 6:31**
- SEA – Jason Myers 27-yard field goal, 1:05. Cardinals 13-6. **Drive: 7 plays, 68 yards, 0:47.**

**Third quarter**

- ARI – Matt Prater 53-yard field goal, 12:57. Cardinals 16-6. **Drive: 5 plays, 25 yards, 2:03.**

**Fourth quarter**

- SEA – DeeJay Dallas 2-yard run (Jason Myers kick), 7:05. Cardinals 16-13. **Drive: 5 plays, 74 yards, 1:51**
- ARI – James Conner 1-yard run (Matt Prater kick), 2:20. Cardinals 23-13. **Drive: 10 plays, 67 yards, 4:45**

**Top passers**

- ARI – Colt McCoy – 35/44, 328 yards, 2 TD
- SEA – Russell Wilson – 14/26, 207 yards

**Top rushers**

- ARI – James Conner – 21 rushes, 62 yards, TD
- SEA – Alex Collins – 10 rushes, 36 yards

**Top receivers**

- ARI – Zach Ertz – 8 receptions, 88 yards, 2 TD
- SEA – Tyler Lockett – 4 receptions, 115 yards

As of 2026, this remains their most recent win against the Seahawks.

==== Week 13: at Chicago Bears ====
Week 13: Arizona Cardinals at Chicago Bears – Game summary

Quarter	1	2	3	4	Total
**Cardinals**	14	7	3	9	**33**
Bears	0	7	7	8	**22**

at Soldier Field, Chicago, Illinois

- Date: December 5
- Game time: 12:00 p.m. CST/11:00 a.m. MST
- Game weather: Cloudy, 35 °F (2 °C)
- Game attendance: 60,803
- Referee: Jerome Boger
- TV announcers (Fox): Adam Amin, Mark Schlereth and Shannon Spake
- Recap, Game Book

Game information

**First quarter**

- ARI – DeAndre Hopkins 20-yard pass from Kyler Murray (Matt Prater kick), 10:55. Cardinals 7–0. **Drive: 4 plays, 28 yards, 2:40.**
- ARI – Kyler Murray 9-yard run (Matt Prater kick), 1:39. Cardinals 14–0. **Drive: 5 plays, 15 yards, 2:12.**

**Second quarter**

- CHI – David Montgomery 1-yard run (Cairo Santos kick), 8:50. Cardinals 14–7. **Drive: 13 plays, 77 yards, 7:49.**
- ARI – James Conner 23-yard pass from Kyler Murray (Matt Prater kick), 5:40. Cardinals 21–7. **Drive: 7 plays, 74 yards, 3:10.**

**Third quarter**

- ARI – Matt Prater 33-yard field goal, 9:52. Cardinals 24–7. **Drive: 9 plays, 51 yards, 5:08.**
- CHI – Jimmy Graham 1-yard pass from Andy Dalton (Cairo Santos kick), 2:49. Cardinals 24–14. **Drive: 13 plays, 73 yards, 7:03.**

**Fourth quarter**

- ARI – Matt Prater 25-yard field goal, 8:31. Cardinals 27–14. **Drive: 6 plays, 21 yards, 3:05.**
- ARI – Kyler Murray 3-yard run (pass failed), 6:23. Cardinals 33–14. **Drive: 2 plays, 12 yards, 0:45.**
- CHI – Jakeem Grant 8-yard pass from Andy Dalton (Andy Dalton–Jimmy Graham pass), 2:45. Cardinals 33–22. **Drive: 12 plays, 75 yards, 3:38.**

**Top passers**

- ARI – Kyler Murray – 11/15, 123 yards, 2 TD
- CHI – Andy Dalton – 26/41, 229 yards, 2 TD, 4 INT

**Top rushers**

- ARI – James Conner – 20 runs, 75 yards
- CHI – David Montgomery – 21 rushes, 90 yards, TD

**Top receivers**

- ARI – James Conner – 2 receptions, 36 yards, TD
- CHI – Jakeem Grant – 5 receptions, 62 yards, TD

Kyler Murray and DeAndre Hopkins returned to the field after the bye and connected for a 21-yard touchdown in the first quarter.

==== Week 14: vs. Los Angeles Rams ====
Week 14: Los Angeles Rams at Arizona Cardinals – Game summary

Quarter	1	2	3	4	Total
**Rams**	0	13	14	3	**30**
Cardinals	3	10	0	10	**23**

at State Farm Stadium, Glendale, Arizona

- Date: December 13
- Game time: 6:15 p.m. MST
- Game weather: Partly cloudy, 65 °F (18 °C) (retractable roof open)
- Game attendance: 63,999
- Referee: Carl Cheffers
- TV announcers (ESPN/ABC/ESPN+): Steve Levy, Brian Griese, Louis Riddick, Lisa Salters, and John Parry
- Recap, Game Book

Game information

**First quarter**

- ARI – Matt Prater 53-yard field goal, 10:58. Cardinals 3–0. **Drive: 10 plays, 40 yards, 4:02.**

**Second quarter**

- LAR – Odell Beckham Jr. 2-yard pass from Matthew Stafford (Matt Gay kick), 12:53. Rams 7–3. **Drive: 10 plays, 68 yards, 5:57.**
- LAR – Matt Gay 55-yard field goal, 7:23. Rams 10–3. **Drive: 8 plays, 34 yards, 2:54.**
- ARI – James Conner 1-yard run (Matt Prater kick), 3:18. Tied 10–10. **Drive: 9 plays, 75 yards, 4:05.**
- LAR – Matt Gay 35-yard field goal, 0:35. Rams 13–10. **Drive: 7 plays, 53 yards, 2:43.**
- ARI – Matt Prater 53-yard field goal, 0:00. Tied 13–13. **Drive: 6 plays, 40 yards, 0:35.**

**Third quarter**

- LAR – Van Jefferson 52-yard pass from Matthew Stafford (Matt Gay kick), 13:36. Rams 20–13. **Drive: 3 plays, 75 yards, 1:24.**
- LAR – Cooper Kupp 4-yard pass from Matthew Stafford (Matt Gay kick), 9:45. Rams 27–13. **Drive: 7 plays, 19 yards, 3:19.**

**Fourth quarter**

- ARI – James Conner 8-yard run (Matt Prater kick), 13:38. Rams 27–20. **Drive: 6 plays, 73 yards, 3:07.**
- LAR – Matt Gay 33-yard field goal, 7:20. Rams 30–20. **Drive: 10 plays, 60 yards, 6:18.**
- ARI – Matt Prater 49-yard field goal, 0:37. Rams 30–23. **Drive: 11 plays, 56 yards, 2:07.**

**Top passers**

- LAR – Matthew Stafford – 23/30, 287 yards, 3 TD
- ARI – Kyler Murray – 32/49, 383 yards, 2 INT

**Top rushers**

- LAR – Sony Michel – 20 rushes, 79 yards
- ARI – Kyler Murray – 7 rushes, 61 yards

**Top receivers**

- LAR – Cooper Kupp – 13 receptions, 123 yards, TD
- ARI – A. J. Green – 7 receptions, 102 yards

==== Week 15: at Detroit Lions ====
Week 15: Arizona Cardinals at Detroit Lions – Game summary

Quarter	1	2	3	4	Total
Cardinals	0	0	6	6	**12**
**Lions**	3	14	7	6	**30**

at Ford Field, Detroit, Michigan

- Date: December 19
- Game time: 1:00 p.m. EST/11:00 a.m. MST
- Game weather: None (indoor stadium)
- Game attendance: 45,211
- Referee: Land Clark
- TV announcers (Fox): Gus Johnson, Aqib Talib and Megan Olivi
- Recap, Game Book

Game information

**First quarter**

- DET – Riley Patterson 37-yard field goal, 6:10. Lions 3–0. **Drive: 15 plays, 63 yards, 8:50.**

**Second quarter**

- DET – Amon-Ra St. Brown 37-yard pass from Jared Goff (Riley Patterson kick), 14:53. Lions 10–0. **Drive: 8 plays, 93 yards, 3:49.**
- DET – Josh Reynolds 22-yard pass from Jared Goff (Riley Patterson kick), 0:19. Lions 17–0. **Drive: 9 plays, 97 yards, 1:40.**

**Third quarter**

- ARI – Matt Prater 29-yard field goal, 11:22. Lions 17–3. **Drive: 9 plays, 64 yards, 3:38.**
- DET – Jason Cabinda 6-yard pass from Jared Goff (Riley Patterson kick), 8:10. Lions 24–3. **Drive: 1 play, 6 yards, 0:05.**
- ARI – Matt Prater 29-yard field goal, 3:54. Lions 24–6. **Drive: 11 plays, 72 yards, 4:16.**

**Fourth quarter**

- DET – Riley Patterson 47-yard field goal, 13:15. Lions 27–6. **Drive: 10 plays, 46 yards, 5:39.**
- ARI – Christian Kirk 26-yard pass from Kyler Murray (pass failed), 4:40. Lions 27–12. **Drive: 12 plays, 87 yards, 3:08.**
- DET – Riley Patterson 45-yard field goal, 2:46. Lions 30–12. **Drive: 6 plays, 19 yards, 1:54.**

**Top passers**

- ARI – Kyler Murray – 23/41, 257 yards, TD, INT
- DET – Jared Goff – 21/26, 216 yards, 3 TD

**Top rushers**

- ARI – Chase Edmonds – 6 rushes, 53 yards
- DET – Craig Reynolds – 26 rushes, 112 yards

**Top receivers**

- ARI – Christian Kirk – 9 receptions, 94 yards, TD
- DET – Amon-Ra St. Brown – 8 receptions, 90 yards, TD

The Lions opened the scoring in the first quarter via a 37-yard field goal by Riley Patterson. The Lions scored 14 points in the second quarter via a 37-yard touchdown pass from Jared Goff to Amon-Ra St. Brown and a 22-yard touchdown pass from Goff to Josh Reynolds, which made the score 17–0 in favor of Detroit at half-time. The Cardinals finally got on the board in the third quarter via a 29-yard field goal by Matt Prater. The Lions extended their lead via a six-yard touchdown pass from Goff to Jason Cabinda. The Cardinals responded with a 29-yard field goal by Prater. The Lions extended their lead in the fourth quarter via a 47-yard field goal by Patterson. The Cardinals responded with a 26-yard touchdown pass from Kyler Murray to Christian Kirk. The Lions scored the final points of the game via a 45-yard field goal by Patterson, making the final score 30–12 in favor of Detroit.

==== Week 16: vs. Indianapolis Colts ====
NFL on Christmas Day

Week 16: Indianapolis Colts at Arizona Cardinals – Game summary

Quarter	1	2	3	4	Total
**Colts**	7	5	3	7	**22**
Cardinals	6	0	7	3	**16**

at State Farm Stadium, Glendale, Arizona

- Date: December 25
- Game time: 6:15 p.m. MST
- Game weather: None (retractable roof closed)
- Game attendance: 63,900
- Referee: Craig Wrolstad
- TV announcers (NFLN): Joe Davis, Kurt Warner, Melissa Stark and Peter Schrager
- Recap, Game Book

Game information

**First quarter**

- IND – T. Y. Hilton 1-yard pass from Carson Wentz (Michael Badgley kick), 6:11. Colts 7–0. **Drive: 6 plays, 59 yards, 3:29.**
- ARI – Chase Edmonds 2-yard run (kick failed), 3:03. Colts 7–6. **Drive: 7 plays, 90 yards, 3:08.**

**Second quarter**

- IND – Penalty on Kyler Murray enforced in end zone for a Safety, 4:20. Colts 9–6.
- IND – Michael Badgley 41-yard field goal, 0:01. Colts 12–6. **Drive: 10 plays, 45 yards, 4:19.**

**Third quarter**

- ARI – Antoine Wesley 24-yard pass from Kyler Murray (Matt Prater kick), 10:53. Cardinals 13–12. **Drive: 3 plays, 42 yards, 1:22.**
- IND – Michael Badgley 37-yard field goal, 0:03. Colts 15–13. **Drive: 10 plays, 56 yards, 5:18.**

**Fourth quarter**

- IND – Dezmon Patmon 14-yard pass from Carson Wentz (Michael Badgley kick), 6:37. Colts 22–13. **Drive: 7 plays, 69 yards, 4:30.**
- ARI – Matt Prater 28-yard field goal, 0:42. Colts 22–16. **Drive: 16 plays, 81 yards, 3:34.**

**Top passers**

- IND – Carson Wentz – 18/28, 225 yards, 2 TD
- ARI – Kyler Murray – 27/43, 245 yards, TD

**Top rushers**

- IND – Jonathan Taylor – 27 rushes, 108 yards
- ARI – Kyler Murray – 4 rushes, 74 yards

**Top receivers**

- IND – Michael Pittman Jr. – 8 receptions, 82 yards
- ARI – Chase Edmonds – 8 receptions, 71 yards

==== Week 17: at Dallas Cowboys ====
Week 17: Arizona Cardinals at Dallas Cowboys – Game summary

Quarter	1	2	3	4	Total
**Cardinals**	3	10	9	3	**25**
Cowboys	0	7	0	15	**22**

at AT&T Stadium, Arlington, Texas

- Date: January 2
- Game time: 3:25 p.m. CST/2:25 p.m. MST
- Game weather: None (retractable roof closed)
- Game attendance: 93,459
- Referee: Scott Novak
- TV announcers (Fox): Joe Buck, Troy Aikman, Erin Andrews, and Tom Rinaldi
- Recap, Game Book

Game information

**First quarter**

- ARI – Matt Prater 24-yard field goal, 7:46. Cardinals 3–0. **Drive: 9 plays, 78 yards, 3:12.**

**Second quarter**

- ARI – Antoine Wesley 1-yard pass from Kyler Murray (Matt Prater kick), 5:27. Cardinals 10–0. **Drive: 15 plays, 91 yards, 8:25.**
- DAL – Michael Gallup 21-yard pass from Dak Prescott (Greg Zuerlein kick), 1:25. Cardinals 10–7. **Drive: 11 plays, 77 yards, 4:02.**
- ARI – Matt Prater 53-yard field goal, 0:00. Cardinals 13–7. **Drive: 10 plays, 40 yards, 1:25.**

**Third quarter**

- ARI – Antoine Wesley 19-yard pass from Kyler Murray (pass failed), 9:39. Cardinals 19–7. **Drive: 8 plays, 75 yards, 5:21.**
- ARI – Matt Prater 26-yard field goal, 4:01. Cardinals 22–7. **Drive: 9 plays, 49 yards, 4:44.**

**Fourth quarter**

- DAL – Cedrick Wilson Jr. 2-yard pass from Dak Prescott (Greg Zuerlein kick), 13:49. Cardinals 22–14. **Drive: 8 plays, 31 yards, 2:52.**
- ARI – Matt Prater 38-yard field goal, 8:32. Cardinals 25–14. **Drive: 5 plays, 24 yards, 1:58.**
- DAL – Amari Cooper 4-yard pass from Dak Prescott (Dak Prescott–Cedrick Wilson Jr. pass), 4:42. Cardinals 25–22. **Drive: 8 plays, 75 yards, 3:50.**

**Top passers**

- ARI – Kyler Murray – 26/38, 263 yards, 2 TD
- DAL – Dak Prescott – 24/38, 226 yards, 3 TD

**Top rushers**

- ARI – Chase Edmonds – 18 rushes, 53 yards
- DAL – Dak Prescott – 5 rushes, 20 yards

**Top receivers**

- ARI – Christian Kirk – 6 receptions, 79 yards
- DAL – Dalton Schultz – 6 receptions, 54 yards

==== Week 18: vs. Seattle Seahawks ====
Week 18: Seattle Seahawks at Arizona Cardinals – Game summary

Quarter	1	2	3	4	Total
**Seahawks**	7	10	7	14	**38**
Cardinals	7	3	14	6	**30**

at State Farm Stadium, Glendale, Arizona

- Date: January 9
- Game time: 2:25 p.m. MST
- Game weather: Sunny, 72 °F (22 °C) (retractable roof open)
- Game attendance: 63,858
- Referee: Shawn Smith
- TV announcers (Fox): Adam Amin, Mark Schlereth and Shannon Spake
- Recap, Game Book

Game information

**First quarter**

- ARI – Zach Allen 16-yard fumble return (Matt Prater kick), 14:48. Cardinals 7–0.
- SEA – Tyler Lockett 43-yard pass from Russell Wilson (Jason Myers kick), 12:26. Tied 7–7. **Drive: 5 plays, 75 yards, 2:22.**

**Second quarter**

- ARI – Matt Prater 41-yard field goal, 11:44. Cardinals 10–7. **Drive: 19 plays, 66 yards, 10:41.**
- SEA – Tyler Lockett 5-yard pass from Russell Wilson (Jason Myers kick), 7:41. Seahawks 14–10. **Drive: 10 plays, 75 yards, 4:03.**
- SEA – Jason Myers 38-yard field goal, 1:21. Seahawks 17–10 **Drive: 11 plays, 52 yards, 2:19.**

**Third quarter**

- ARI – James Conner 20-yard pass from Kyler Murray (Matt Prater kick), 11:02. Tied 17–17. **Drive: 6 plays, 77 yards, 3:58.**
- ARI – James Conner 1-yard run (Matt Prater kick), 9:25. Cardinals 24–17. **Drive: 2 plays, 1 yard, 0:37.**
- SEA – Freddie Swain 25-yard pass from Russell Wilson (Jason Myers kick), 1:57. Tied 24–24. **Drive: 5 plays, 72 yards, 2:38.**

**Fourth quarter**

- SEA – Russell Wilson 4-yard run (Jason Myers kick), 13:15. Seahawks 31–24. **Drive: 3 plays, 10 yards, 1:45.**
- ARI – Matt Prater 30-yard field goal, 6:14. Seahawks 31–27. **Drive: 14 plays, 67 yards, 7:01.**
- SEA – Rashaad Penny 62-yard run (Jason Myers kick), 4:34. Seahawks 38–27. **Drive: 3 plays, 75 yards, 1:40.**
- ARI – Matt Prater 36-yard field goal, 1:13. Seahawks 38–30. **Drive: 14 plays, 57 yards, 3:21.**

**Top passers**

- SEA – Russell Wilson – 15/26, 238 yards, 3 TD, INT
- ARI – Kyler Murray – 28/39, 240 yards, TD

**Top rushers**

- SEA – Rashaad Penny – 23 rushes, 190 yards, TD
- ARI – James Conner – 15 rushes, 52 yards, TD

**Top receivers**

- SEA – Tyler Lockett – 5 receptions, 98 yards, 2 TD
- ARI – Zach Ertz – 7 receptions, 84 yards

=== Standings ===
==== Division ====
NFC West
	W	L	T	PCT	DIV	CONF	PF	PA	STK
^{(4)} Los Angeles Rams	12	5	0	.706	3–3	8–4	460	372	L1
^{(5)} Arizona Cardinals	11	6	0	.647	4–2	7–5	449	366	L1
^{(6)} San Francisco 49ers	10	7	0	.588	2–4	7–5	427	365	W2
Seattle Seahawks	7	10	0	.412	3–3	4–8	395	366	W2

==== Conference ====
NFC
#	Team	Division	W	L	T	PCT	DIV	CONF	SOS	SOV	STK
**Division winners**
1 (Note: Green Bay finished ahead of Tampa Bay based on conference record (9–3 vs. 8–4), claiming the No. 1 seed.)	Green Bay Packers	North	13	4	0	.765	4–2	9–3	.479	.480	L1
2	Tampa Bay Buccaneers	South	13	4	0	.765	4–2	8–4	.467	.443	W3
3 (Note: Dallas claimed the No. 3 seed over LA Rams based on conference record (10–2 vs. 8–4).)	Dallas Cowboys	East	12	5	0	.706	6–0	10–2	.488	.431	W1
4	Los Angeles Rams	West	12	5	0	.706	3–3	8–4	.483	.409	L1
**Wild cards**
5	Arizona Cardinals	West	11	6	0	.647	4–2	7–5	.490	.492	L1
6	San Francisco 49ers	West	10	7	0	.588	2–4	7–5	.500	.438	W2
7 (Note: Philadelphia finished ahead of New Orleans based on head-to-head victory, claiming the 7th and final playoff spot.)	Philadelphia Eagles	East	9	8	0	.529	3–3	7–5	.469	.350	L1
**Did not qualify for the postseason**
8	New Orleans Saints	South	9	8	0	.529	4–2	7–5	.512	.516	W2
9	Minnesota Vikings	North	8	9	0	.471	4–2	6–6	.507	.434	W1
10 (Note: Washington finished ahead of Atlanta and Seattle based on head-to-head victories.)	Washington Football Team	East	7	10	0	.412	2–4	6–6	.529	.420	W1
11 (Note: Seattle finished ahead of Atlanta based on win percentage in common games (4–2 vs. 3–3 against: San Francisco, New Orleans, Jacksonville, Washington, and Detroit).)	Seattle Seahawks	West	7	10	0	.412	3–3	4–8	.519	.424	W2
12	Atlanta Falcons	South	7	10	0	.412	2–4	4–8	.472	.315	L2
13	Chicago Bears	North	6	11	0	.353	2–4	4–8	.524	.373	L1
14	Carolina Panthers	South	5	12	0	.294	2–4	3–9	.509	.412	L7
15	New York Giants	East	4	13	0	.235	1–5	3–9	.536	.485	L6
16	Detroit Lions	North	3	13	1	.206	2–4	3–9	.528	.627	W1
**Tiebreakers** (Note: When breaking ties for three or more teams under the NFL's rules, they are first broken within divisions, then comparing only the highest-ranked remaining team from each division.)

== Postseason ==
Round	Date	Opponent (seed)	Result	Record	Venue	Recap
Wild Card	January 17	at Los Angeles Rams (4)	L 11–34	0–1	SoFi Stadium	Recap

=== Game summaries ===
==== NFC Wild Card Playoffs: at (4) Los Angeles Rams ====
NFC Wild Card Playoffs: (5) Arizona Cardinals at (4) Los Angeles Rams – Game summary

Quarter	1	2	3	4	Total
Cardinals	0	0	8	3	11
Rams	7	14	7	6	34

at SoFi Stadium, Inglewood, California

- Date: January 17, 2022
- Game time: 6:15 p.m. MST/5:15 p.m. PST
- Game weather: Cloudy, 63 °F (17 °C)
- Game attendance: 70,625
- Referee: Clay Martin
- TV announcers (ABC/ESPN): Steve Levy, Brian Griese, Louis Riddick, and Lisa Salters
- Recap, Game Book

Game information

First quarter

- LAR – Odell Beckham Jr. 4-yard pass from Matthew Stafford (Matt Gay kick), 3:50. Rams 7–0. Drive: 10 plays, 52 yards, 6:05.

Second quarter

- LAR – Matthew Stafford 1-yard run (Matt Gay kick), 11:58. Rams 14–0. Drive: 9 plays, 68 yards, 5:17.
- LAR – David Long 3-yard interception return (Matt Gay kick), 7:59. Rams 21–0.

Third quarter

- LAR – Cooper Kupp 7-yard pass from Matthew Stafford (Matt Gay kick), 10:36. Rams 28–0. Drive: 8 plays, 75 yards, 4:24.
- ARI – James Conner 2-yard run (Kyler Murray–Antoine Wesley pass), 4:11. Rams 28–8. Drive: 12 plays, 75 yards, 6:25.

Fourth quarter

- LAR – Matt Gay 37-yard field goal, 14:55. Rams 31–8. Drive: 7 plays, 50 yards, 4:16.
- ARI – Matt Prater 55-yard field goal, 10:13. Rams 31–11. Drive: 10 plays, 38 yards, 4:42.
- LAR – Matt Gay 46-yard field goal, 4:21. Rams 34–11. Drive: 9 plays, 61 yards, 5:52.

Top passers

- ARI – Kyler Murray – 19/34, 137 yards, 2 INT
- LAR – Matthew Stafford – 13/17, 202 yards, 2 TD

Top rushers

- ARI – Chase Edmonds – 8 rushes, 28 yards
- LAR – Sony Michel – 13 rushes, 58 yards

Top receivers

- ARI – Christian Kirk – 6 receptions, 51 yards
- LAR – Cooper Kupp – 5 receptions, 61 yards, TD

== Statistics ==
=== Starters ===
==== Regular season ====
Offense

Pos.	Name	GS
QB	Kyler Murray; Colt McCoy	14; 3
RB	James Conner; Chase Edmonds	6; 11
WR	Christian Kirk; DeAndre Hopkins; A.J. Green; Rondale Moore; Antoine Wesley; Greg Dortch	11; 10; 9; 7; 4; 2
TE	Zach Ertz; Maxx Williams; Darrell Daniels; Demetrius Harris	11; 5; 4; 4
LT	D.J. Humphries; Josh Jones	16; 1
LG	Justin Pugh; Sean Harlow	13; 4
C	Rodney Hudson; Max Garcia; Sean Harlow	12; 4; 1
RG	Josh Jones; Max Garcia	10; 7
RT	Kelvin Beachum; Justin Murray; Josh Jones	15; 1; 1

Defense

Pos.	Name	GS
DE	J.J. Watt; Zach Allen	7; 10
NT	Rashard Lawrence; Corey Peters; Leki Fotu	8; 5; 2
DE	Zach Allen; Jordan Phillips; Michael Dogbe; Leki Fotu; Corey Peters	5; 7; 2; 2; 1
OLB	Chandler Jones; Devon Kennard	15; 2
ILB	Isaiah Simmons	17
ILB	Jordan Hicks	17
OLB	Markus Golden; Victor Dimukeje	16; 1
CB	Marco Wilson; Kevin Peterson; Robert Alford	14; 2; 1
SS	Jalen Thompson	17
FS	Budda Baker	17
CB	Byron Murphy; Antonio Hamilton	16; 1

Special Teams

Pos.	Name	GS
P	Andy Lee; Ryan Winslow	16; 1
K	Matt Prater	17
LS	Aaron Brewer; Beau Brinkley	14; 3

==== Postseason ====
Offense

Pos.	Name	GS
QB	Kyler Murray	1
RB	Chase Edmonds	1
WR1	A.J. Green	1
WR2	Antoine Wesley	1
TE1	Zach Ertz	1
TE2	Darrell Daniels	1
LT	D.J. Humphries	1
LG	Justin Pugh	1
C	Rodney Hudson	1
RG	Max Garcia	1
RT	Kelvin Beachum	1

Defense

Pos.	Name	GS
DE	Zach Allen	1
NT	Rashard Lawrence	1
DE	Corey Peters	1
OLB	Chandler Jones	1
ILB	Jordan Hicks	1
ILB	Zaven Collins	1
OLB	Markus Golden	1
CB	Marco Wilson	1
SS	Jalen Thompson	1
FS	Budda Baker	1
CB	Byron Murphy	1

Special Teams

Pos.	Name	GS
P	Andy Lee	1
K	Matt Prater	1
LS	Aaron Brewer	1

=== Individual leaders ===
Category	Player(s)	Value
Passing yards	Kyler Murray	3,787
Passing touchdowns	Kyler Murray	24
Rushing yards	James Conner	752
Rushing touchdowns	James Conner	15
Receptions	Christian Kirk	77
Receiving yards	Christian Kirk	982
Receiving touchdowns	DeAndre Hopkins	8
Kickoff return yards	Rondale Moore	291
Punt return yards	Rondale Moore	171
Tackles	Jalen Thompson	121
Sacks	Markus Golden	11.0
Forced fumbles	Chandler Jones	6
Interceptions	Byron Murphy	4
Kicking - field goals	Matt Prater	30/37, 81.1%
Kicking - extra points	Matt Prater	47/49, 95.9%

=== Team rankings ===
Category	Value	NFL rank (out of 32)
Passing attempts	591	
Passing completions	415	18th
Passing yards	4,276	10th
Passing touchdowns	27	12th
Interceptions thrown	11	7th
Rushing attempts	496	7th
Rushing yards	2,076	10th
Rushing touchdowns	23	3rd
Rushing yards/attempt	4.2	22nd
Total yards of offense	6,352	8th
Points scored	449	11th
Points allowed	366	11th
Passing yards allowed	3,645	7th
Passing touchdowns allowed	30	25th
Rushing attempts against	426	9th
Rushing yards allowed	1,952	20th
Rushing touchdowns allowed	10	3rd
Yards/rush attempt allowed	4.6	26th
Interceptions made	13	15th
Fumbles recovered	14	1st
Total yards allowed	5,597	11th

Statistics correct as of the end of the 2021 NFL season
