= Jalen Thompson =

American football player (born 1998)

No. 34 – Dallas Cowboys
- Position: Safety
- Roster status: Injured reserve/designated for return

Personal information
- Born: July 18, 1998 (age 28); Compton, California, U.S.
- Listed height: 5 ft 11 in (1.80 m)
- Listed weight: 190 lb (86 kg)

Career information
- High school: Downey (Downey, California)
- College: Washington State (2016–2018)
- Supplemental draft: 2019: 5th round

Career history
- Arizona Cardinals (2019–2025); Dallas Cowboys (2026–present)

Awards and highlights
- Second-team All-Pac-12 (2017)

Career NFL statistics as of Week 7, 2026
- Tackles: 595
- Sacks: 2.0
- Forced fumbles: 2
- Fumble recoveries: 4
- Pass deflections: 37
- Interceptions: 9
- Stats at Pro Football Reference

Jalen Thompson (born July 18, 1998) is an American professional football safety for the Dallas Cowboys of the National Football League (NFL). He played college football for the Washington State Cougars and was selected by the Arizona Cardinals in the fifth round of the 2019 NFL supplemental draft. As of 2026, he is the last player that was selected in the Supplemental Draft.

== Early life ==
Thompson was born in Compton, California and grew up in Compton, California. He originally attended La Serna High School where he was named honorable mention All-San Gabriel Valley League as a sophomore as the Lancers went on to win the 2013 CIF Southern Section title. He transferred to Downey High School following his sophomore year where he played both wide receiver and cornerback and was named All-CIF and All-San Gabriel Valley League in his junior and senior seasons. As a senior, Thompson intercepted five passed and averaged 20.2 yards per reception and was named to the All-Area Dream Team by the Long Beach Press-Telegram. Thompson was rated a three-star recruit by ESPN, Rivals and Scout and the No. 56 cornerback nationally by ESPN.com. He ultimately committed to play college football at Washington State over offers from San Diego State, New Mexico State, Army, and Navy.

== College career ==
Thompson entered Washington State as an early enrollee and participated in the Cougars' spring practices. He was named the starting strong safety entering the season and was named a True Freshman All-American by ESPN after recording 51 tackles and a team-leading seven pass breakups in 13 games. As a sophomore, Thompson led the Cougars with 73 tackles, including 5.5 for loss, two pass breakups and four interceptions (T-3rd in the Pac-12) and led the conference with three fumble recoveries and was named second-team All-Pac-12 Conference and first-team all-conference by the Associated Press. Thompson entered his junior season on the Chuck Bednarik Award watchlist and recorded 67 tackles (4th on the team) along with two interceptions and eight passes broken up and was named honorable mention all-conference. Thompson lost his final season of eligibility due to a violation of NCAA rules going into his senior season, which was reportedly due to purchasing a non-steroid over-the-counter supplement that is banned by the NCAA. Over the course of his collegiate career, Thompson started all 39 of Washington State's games while on the team and finished with 191 tackles with six interceptions and 17 passes broken up.

== Professional career ==
=== Pre-draft ===
On June 28, 2019, Thompson had been informed by the NCAA that he had lost his last year of collegiate eligibility due to a violation stemming from a purchase of an over-the-counter supplement from a local nutrition store. Although the actual supplement purchased was not publicly released, a source had reported it was not a steroid. Without any eligibility remaining, he officially declared himself for the 2019 NFL supplemental draft.

Pre-draft measurables
Height	Weight
5 ft 11 1/4 in (1.81 m)	195 lb (88 kg)
All values from Pro Day

=== Arizona Cardinals ===
==== 2019 ====
On July 10, 2019, the Arizona Cardinals were awarded Thompson for a fifth round pick, the only player selected in the 2019 NFL Supplemental draft. On July 17, the Cardinals signed Thompson to a four–year, $2.86 million contract that included a signing bonus of $342,920.

During training camp, Thompson competed for a role as a backup safety against Charles Washington, Deionte Thompson, Josh Shaw, and Rudy Ford. Head coach Kliff Kingsbury named Budda Baker and D. J. Swearinger the starting safeties to begin the regular season with Thompson and Deionte Thompson as backups.

On September 8, 2019, Thompson made his professional regular season debut, playing seven snaps on special teams as the Cardinals tied 27–27 against the Detroit Lions. In Week 3, Thompson was inactive as a healthy scratch as the Cardinals lost 20–38 to the Carolina Panthers. On September 30, 2019, the Arizona Cardinals released starting free safety D.J. Swearinger, citing issues in coverage. Head coach Kliff Kingsbury stated his replacement would be Thompson, Deionte Thompson, or Chris Banjo. On October 6, 2019, Thompson earned his first career start, replacing D.J. Swearinger at free safety, and collected a season-high eight combined tackles (five solo) in a 26–23 victory at the Cincinnati Bengals. On November 17, 2019, Thompson made five solo tackles, a pass deflection, and also had his first career interception off a pass by Jimmy Garoppolo intended for tight end Ross Dwelley during the fourth quarter of a 36–26 loss at the San Francisco 49ers. He finished his rookie season in 2019 with a total of 57 combined tackles (42 solo), three passes defended and an interception in 15 games and nine starts. Thompson earned an overall grade of 64.4 from Pro Football Focus for the 2019 NFL season.

==== 2020 ====
Throughout training camp, he competed against Deionte Thompson for the role as the starting strong safety. Defensive coordinator Vance Joseph chose Thompson to be the starting strong safety, along with starting free safety Budda Baker, to start the regular season. On September 13, 2020, Thompson started in the Arizona Cardinals season-opener, but injured his ankle after making one solo tackle and exited on the first drive of the first quarter. On September 17, 2020, the Arizona Cardinals placed Thompson on injured reserve after he injured his ankle in Week 1 and he remained sidelined for the next six consecutive games (Week 2–7). On November 4, 2020, Thompson was activated from injured reserve. In Week 10, he collected a season-high seven combined tackles (six solo) as the Cardinals defeated the Buffalo Bills 32–30. On November 19, 2020, Thompson recorded three combined tackles (two solo) before exiting in the Cardinals' 21–28 loss at the Seattle Seahawks. He subsequently missed the next five games (Weeks 12–17). Thompson completed the 2020 NFL season with 19 combined tackles (16 solo) and one pass deflection in five games and four starts. He received an overall grade of 70.1 from Pro Football Focus in 2020.

==== 2021 ====
The Arizona Cardinals' new head coach Kliff Kingsbury chose to retain Thompson and Budda Baker as the starting safeties to begin the season. On December 5, 2021, Thompson collected a season-high ten combined tackles (five solo), made one pass deflection, and intercepted a pass by Andy Dalton to wide receiver Jakeem Grant during a 33–22 victory at the Chicago Bears. In Week 18, he made six combined tackles (four solo), a season-high two pass deflections, and intercepted a pass thrown by Russell Wilson to running back Travis Homer as the Cardinals lost 38–30. He finished the 2021 NFL season with a career-high 121 combined tackles (79 solo), seven pass deflections, and three interceptions in 17 games and 12 starts. He received an overall grade of 68.2 from Pro Football Focus in 2021.

The Arizona Cardinals finished the 2021 NFL season second in the NFC West with a 11–6 record, clinching a playoff berth. On January 17, 2022, Thompson led his team with 12 combined tackles (six solo) as the Cardinals lost 11–34 at the Los Angeles Rams during the NFC Wild-Card Game.

==== 2022 ====
On September 2, 2022, the Arizona Cardinals signed Thompson to a three–year, $36.00 million contract that includes $20.17 million guaranteed upon signing and an initial signing bonus of $10.17 million. He returned as the starting free safety to begin the season and was paired with Budda Baker.

In Week 4, Thompson recorded two combined tackles (one solo), made a pass deflection, and intercepted a pass by Baker Mayfield to wide receiver D. J. Moore during a 26–16 win at the Carolina Panthers. On December 25, 2022, Thompson collected a season-high 11 combined tackles (ten solo) and made a pass deflection during a 16–19 overtime loss against the Tampa Bay Buccaneers. He started all 17 games during the 2022 NFL season and made 110 combined tackles (79 solo), eight pass deflections, and one interception. He received an overall grade of 76.2 from Pro Football Focus in 2022.

==== 2023 ====
On February 14, 2023, the Arizona Cardinals hired Philadelphia Eagles' defensive coordinator Jonathan Gannon as their new head coach after they fired Kliff Kingsbury after finishing with a 4–13 record in 2022. Defensive coordinator Nick Rallis chose to retain Thompson and Budda Baker as the starting safeties to begin the season.

On September 17, 2023, Thompson made seven combined tackles (five solo), one pass deflection, and returned an interception thrown by Daniel Jones to running back Saquon Barkley for a season-long 35–yard return during a 26–31 loss to the New York Giants. He suffered a hamstring injury and was inactive for two games (Weeks 6–7). On November 19, 2023, Thompson collected a season-high eight solo tackles, made an interception, and had his first career sack on C. J. Stroud for a nine–yard loss during a 16–21 loss at the Houston Texans. The following week, he recorded seven combined tackles (five solo), made one pass deflection, and picked off a pass thrown by Matthew Stafford to wide receiver Puka Nacua as the Cardinals lost 14–37 against the Los Angeles Rams in Week 12. In Week 16, Thompson made five combined tackles (four solo), set a season-high with three pass deflections, and set a career-high with his fourth interception of the season on a pass thrown by Justin Fields to running back Khalil Herbert as the Cardinals lost 16–27 at the Chicago Bears. He finished the 2023 NFL season with 78 combined tackles (59 solo), nine pass deflections, and a career-high four interceptions in 15 games and 15 starts. He received an overall grade of 71.3 from Pro Football Focus in 2023.

==== 2024 ====
Defensive coordinator Nick Rallis retained Thompson and Budda Baker as the starting safeties to begin the season. In Week 5, Thompson made four combined tackles (three solo) and set a season-high with two pass deflections during a 24–23 victory at the San Francisco 49ers. On October 27, 2024, Thompson collected a season-high 11 combined tackles (eight solo) during a 28–27 win at the Miami Dolphins. He was inactive for two games (Weeks 10 and 12) due to an ankle injury he sustained during practice. He finished the season with 98 combined tackles (61 solo), three pass deflections, and two fumble recoveries in 15 games and 15 starts. He received an overall grade of 68.8 from Pro Football Focus, which ranked 51st amongst 171 qualifying safeties in 2024.

=== Dallas Cowboys ===
On March 9, 2026, Thompson signed a three-year, $36 million contract with the Dallas Cowboys. On September 30, 2026, Thompson was placed on injured reserve.

== NFL career statistics ==
Legend
**Bold**	Career high

=== Regular season ===
Year	Team	Games		Tackles					Interceptions						Fumbles				
Year	Team	GP	GS	Cmb	Solo	Ast	Sck	TFL	Int	Yds	Avg	Lng	TD	PD	FF	Fmb	FR	Yds	TD
2019	ARI	15	9	57	45	12	0.0	0	1	18	**18.0**	18	0	3	0	0	1	**24**	0
2020	ARI	5	4	19	16	3	0.0	0	0	0	0.0	0	0	1	0	0	0	0	0
2021	ARI	17	12	**121**	**79**	**42**	0.0	3	3	**49**	16.3	33	0	7	0	0	0	0	0
2022	ARI	17	17	110	**79**	31	0.0	1	1	0	0.0	0	0	8	0	0	1	0	0
2023	ARI	15	15	78	59	19	**1.0**	**5**	**4**	**49**	12.3	**35**	0	**9**	**1**	0	0	0	0
2024	ARI	15	15	98	61	37	0.0	3	0	0	0.0	0	0	3	0	0	**2**	0	0
2025	ARI	15	15	95	58	37	**1.0**	2	0	0	0.0	0	0	6	**1**	0	0	0	0
2026	DAL	4	3	17	8	9	0.0	0	0	0	0.0	0	0	0	0	0	0	0	0
Career		103	90	595	405	190	2.0	14	9	116	12.9	35	0	37	2	0	4	24	0

=== Postseason ===
Year	Team	Games		Tackles					Interceptions						Fumbles				
Year	Team	GP	GS	Cmb	Solo	Ast	Sck	TFL	Int	Yds	Avg	Lng	TD	PD	FF	Fmb	FR	Yds	TD
2021	ARI	1	1	12	6	6	0.0	0	0	0	0.0	0	0	0	0	0	0	0	0
Career		1	1	12	6	6	0.0	0	0	0	0.0	0	0	0	0	0	0	0	0
