= Byron Murphy =

American football player (born 1998)

No. 7 – Minnesota Vikings
- Position: Cornerback
- Roster status: Active

Personal information
- Born: January 18, 1998 (age 28); Scottsdale, Arizona, U.S.
- Listed height: 5 ft 11 in (1.80 m)
- Listed weight: 190 lb (86 kg)

Career information
- High school: Saguaro (Scottsdale)
- College: Washington (2016–2018)
- NFL draft: 2019: 2nd round, 33rd overall pick

Career history
- Arizona Cardinals (2019–2022); Minnesota Vikings (2023–present)

Awards and highlights
- Pro Bowl (2024); First-team All-Pac-12 (2018)

Career NFL statistics as of Week 10, 2026
- Total tackles: 479
- Interceptions: 20
- Interception return yards: 192
- Pass deflections: 75
- Forced fumbles: 3
- Fumble recoveries: 7
- Sacks: 3.0
- Defensive touchdownss: 2
- Stats at Pro Football Reference

Byron Murphy Jr. (born January 18, 1998) is an American professional football cornerback for the Minnesota Vikings of the National Football League (NFL). He played college football for the Washington Huskies and was selected by the Arizona Cardinals in the second round of the 2019 NFL draft.

== Early life ==
Murphy attended Saguaro High School in Scottsdale, Arizona. He played cornerback and wide receiver. As a senior, he had 88 receptions for 1,733 yards and 21 touchdowns on offense and 52 tackles and seven interceptions on defense. Murphy committed to the University of Washington to play college football.

== College career ==
After redshirting his first year at Washington in 2016, Murphy played in six games with six starts in 2017, missing seven due to injury. He finished the season with 16 tackles and three interceptions. He returned to Washington as a starter in 2018. He was awarded the MVP at the 2018 Pac-12 Football Championship Game after making two interceptions, one of which he returned for a 66-yard touchdown. On January 7, 2019, Murphy announced that he would forgo his remaining two years of eligibility and declare for the 2019 NFL draft.

== Professional career ==
=== Pre-draft ===
Sports Illustrated and NFLDraftScout.com had Murphy ranked as the second best cornerback prospect in the draft. Pro Football Focus and NFL draft analyst Bucky Brooks had Murphy ranked as the top cornerback prospect in the 2019 NFL draft. Scouts Inc. also ranked him as the best cornerback in the draft (27th overall). NFL media analyst Daniel Jeremiah listed Murphy as the top cornerback prospect (26th overall). NFL draft analysts projected Murphy to be a first round pick and the first cornerback to be selected in the 2019 NFL Draft.

External videos
- Byron Murphy's NFL Combine Workout
- PFF Prospect Profile: Byron Murphy

Pre-draft measurables
Height	Weight	Arm length	Hand span	Wingspan	40-yard dash	10-yard split	20-yard split	20-yard shuttle	Three-cone drill	Vertical jump	Broad jump	Bench press
5 ft 10 3/4 in (1.80 m)	190 lb (86 kg)	30 1/8 in (0.77 m)	8 7/8 in (0.23 m)	5 ft 11 3/8 in (1.81 m)	4.55 s	1.51 s	2.67 s	4.13 s	6.83 s	36.5 in (0.93 m)	10 ft 0 in (3.05 m)	14 reps
All values from NFL Combine/Pro Day

=== Arizona Cardinals ===
The Arizona Cardinals selected Murphy in the second round (33rd overall) of the 2019 NFL draft. He was the second cornerback selected in 2019, behind Deandre Baker (30th overall), who was selected by the New York Giants before being released after one season. Murphy was also the second of seven Washington players drafted that year and the first of three Washington defensive backs.

External videos
- Cardinals select Byron Murphy No. 33
- ESPN NFL Draft Profile: Byron Murphy

==== 2019 ====
On May 9, 2019, the Arizona Cardinals signed Murphy to a four–year, $7.98 million contract that includes $5.63 million guaranteed and a signing bonus of $3.83 million.

Throughout training camp, he competed to be a starting cornerback against Tramaine Brock and Chris Payton-Jones after long-time starting cornerback Patrick Peterson was suspended for the first six games of the regular season. Head coach Kliff Kingsbury named Murphy and Tramaine Brock the starting cornerbacks to begin the regular season.

On September 8, 2019, Murphy made his professional regular season debut and earned his first career start, recording five combined tackles (four solo) during a 27–27 tie with the Detroit Lions. In Week 5, he racked up a season-high nine combined tackles (seven solo) and a pass deflection in the Cardinals' 26–23 victory at the Cincinnati Bengals. On November 10, 2019, Murphy made five solo tackles, a pass deflection, and had his first career interception off a pass thrown by Jameis Winston and originally intended for wide receiver Chris Godwin in a 30–27 loss at the Tampa Bay Buccaneers. He completed his rookie season with a total 78 combined tackles (66 solo), ten pass deflections, and one interception while starting all 16 regular season games.

==== 2020 ====
During training camp, Murphy competed against Robert Alford, Dre Kirkpatrick, and B. W. Webb to be the No. 2 starting cornerback. Defensive coordinator Vance Joseph also had Murphy transition to a role as the primary nickelback. Head coach Kliff Kingsbury named Murphy and Patrick Peterson the starting cornerbacks to start the regular season.

In Week 6, he collected a season-high eight combined tackles (seven solo), two pass deflections, and recovered a fumble during a 38–10 victory at the Dallas Cowboys. In Week 7, Murphy recorded two solo tackles and had his first career sack on Russell Wilson as the Cardinals defeated the Seattle Seahawks 37–34 in overtime on Sunday Night Football. On November 2, 2020, the Arizona Cardinals placed Murphy on the reserve/COVID-19 list. On November 11, 2020, the Arizona Cardinals reactivated him, but he subsequently was inactive for the Cardinals' Week 9 loss to the Miami Dolphins. On December 20, 2020, Murphy made four solo tackles, a season-high three pass deflections, and a sack during a 33–26 victory against the Philadelphia Eagles. He finished the 2020 NFL season with 51 combined tackles (40 solo), eight pass deflections, two fumble recoveries, and two sacks in 15 games and seven starts.

==== 2021 ====
After starting cornerbacks Patrick Peterson and Dre Kirkpatrick departed in free agency defensive coordinator Vance Joseph was required to fill their roles. Murphy competed to be a starting cornerback, amongst the likes of Robert Alford, Malcolm Butler, Daryl Worley, Darqueze Dennard, and rookie Marco Wilson. Head coach Kliff Kingsbury named Murphy and Marco Wilson the starting cornerbacks to begin the season.

On September 26, 2021, Murphy made four combined tackles (three solo), two pass deflections, two interceptions, and scored his first career touchdown during a 31–19 victory against the Jacksonville Jaguars. His touchdown came in the second quarter, after quarterback Trevor Lawrence had a pass that was intended for Jacob Hollister deflected by linebacker Jordan Hicks and caught by Murphy before returning it for 29-yards for a touchdown. His Week 3 performance against Jacksonville earned him the National Football Conference Defensive Player of the Week. He was sidelined for the Cardinals' Week 5 win against the San Francisco 49ers after injuring his ribs. In Week 13, he recorded six combined tackles (four solo), was credited with half a sack, a season-high two pass deflections, and intercepted a pass by Andy Dalton in the Cardinals' 33-22 victory at the Chicago Bears. He finished the 2021 NFL season with a total of 64 combined tackles (49 solo), one touchdown, was credited with half a sack, and lead the Arizona Cardinals with 12 pass deflections and four interceptions in 15 games and 15 starts.

==== 2022 ====
Head coach Kliff Kingsbury named Murphy and Marco Wilson the starting cornerbacks to start the season. On September 18, 2022, Murphy made one tackle and recovered a fumble by Hunter Renfrow that was caused by Isaiah Simmons for a 69–yard return to score the game-winning touchdown during a 29–23 overtime victory against the Las Vegas Raiders. On December 24, 2022, the Arizona Cardinals placed Murphy on season–ending injured reserve due to a back injury and subsequently lead to him missing the remaining seven games of the season (Weeks 10–18). He finished the season with 36 combined tackles (22 solo), four passes defensed, and two fumble recoveries through nine starts.

=== Minnesota Vikings ===
==== 2023 ====
On March 15, 2023, the Minnesota Vikings signed Murphy to a two–year, $17.50 million contract that includes $12.60 million guaranteed and an initial signing bonus of $7.00 million. He was signed to be a starting cornerback after the departures of Cameron Dantzler and former teammate Patrick Peterson. Murphy entered training camp slated as the No. 1 cornerback under defensive coordinator Brian Flores. Head coach Kevin O'Connell named Murphy and Akayleb Evans the starting cornerbacks to begin the season.

On September 24, 2023, Murphy recorded a season-high ten combined tackles (nine solo) and broke up two passes during a 24–28 loss to the Los Angeles Chargers. On October 15, 2023, Murphy made four combined tackles (two solo), a season-high three pass deflections, and had his first interception as a member of the Vikings on a pass attempt thrown by Tyson Bagent intended for wide receiver D. J. Moore in the Bears' last drive in the end of the fourth quarter to seal a 19–13 victory at the Chicago Bears. In Week 10, he made three solo tackles, tied his season-high of three pass deflections, and had his third interception of the season on a pass by Taylor Heinicke to Damiere Byrd during a 27–19 win against the New Orleans Saints. He was sidelined for the last three games (Weeks 16–18) of the season after injuring his knee. He finished the season with a total of 57 combined tackles (43 solo), a career-high 13 pass deflections, and three interceptions in 14 games and 14 starts.

==== 2024 ====
Throughout training camp, Murphy competed to regain his role as a starting cornerback against Shaq Griffin. Head coach Kevin O'Connell named Murphy a starting cornerback alongside Stephon Gilmore to begin the season. He was also the starting nickelback.

On November 10, 2024, Murphy made one solo tackle, broke up a pass, and had his third consecutive game with an interception off a pass by Mac Jones during a 12–7 win at the Jacksonville Jaguars. In Week 13, he had five combined tackles (four solo), a season-high three pass deflections, and intercepted a pass by Kyler Murray as the Vikings defeated the Arizona Cardinals 23–22. The following week, he recorded three combined tackles (one solo), a pass deflection, and set a career-high with his sixth interception of the season on a pass thrown by Kirk Cousins during a 42–21 win at the Atlanta Falcons. In Week 16, he collected a season-high ten combined tackles (seven solo) and broke up a pass as the Vikings won 27–24 at the Seattle Seahawks. He finished with a total of 81 combined tackles (62 solo), a career-high 14 pass deflections, and a career-high six interceptions while starting all 17 games. He was named to the 2025 Pro Bowl for his first career Pro Bowl and also received a $250,000 incentive bonus for it.

==== 2025 ====
On March 10, 2025, the Minnesota Vikings re-signed Murphy to a three–year, $54.00 million contract extension that includes $34.78 million guaranteed upon signing and an initial signing bonus of $18.00 million.

==== 2026 ====
In Week 5 of the 2026 NFL season against the New Orleans Saints, Murphy posted three tackles, one for a loss, two passes defensed and two interceptions, the second of which sealed the victory for Minnesota. For his effort, Murphy was named NFL Defensive Player of the Week.

== Career statistics ==
Legend
**Bold**	Career high

=== NFL ===
==== Regular season ====
Year	Team	Games		Tackles					Interceptions						Fumbles				
Year	Team	GP	GS	Cmb	Solo	Ast	Sck	TFL	Int	Yds	Avg	Lng	TD	PD	FF	Fum	FR	Yds	TD
2019	ARI	16	16	78	**66**	12	0.0	3	1	0	0.0	0	0	10	0	0	0	0	0
2020	ARI	15	7	51	40	11	**2.0**	3	0	0	0.0	0	0	8	0	0	**2**	3	0
2021	ARI	16	16	64	49	15	0.5	0	4	49	12.3	29	**1**	12	**1**	0	1	0	0
2022	ARI	9	9	36	29	7	0.5	3	0	0	0.0	0	0	4	0	0	**2**	**59**	**1**
2023	MIN	14	14	57	43	14	0.0	4	3	**59**	**19.7**	**37**	0	13	**1**	**1**	1	0	0
2024	MIN	17	17	**81**	62	19	0.0	**6**	**6**	2	0.3	2	0	**14**	**1**	0	0	0	0
2025	MIN	17	17	71	48	**23**	0.0	3	2	15	7.5	15	0	7	0	0	1	0	0
2026	MIN	9	9	41	30	11	0.0	1	4	67	16.8	54	0	7	0	0	0	0	0
Career		113	105	479	367	112	3.0	23	20	192	9.6	54	1	75	3	1	7	62	1

==== Postseason ====
Year	Team	Games		Tackles					Interceptions						Fumbles				
Year	Team	GP	GS	Cmb	Solo	Ast	Sck	TFL	Int	Yds	Avg	Lng	TD	PD	FF	Fum	FR	Yds	TD
2021	ARI	1	1	**5**	**4**	**1**	0.0	0	0	0	0.0	0	0	0	0	0	0	0	0
2024	MIN	1	1	3	2	**1**	0.0	**1**	0	0	0.0	0	0	0	0	0	0	0	0
Career		2	2	8	6	2	0.0	1	0	0	0.0	0	0	0	0	0	0	0	0

=== College ===
College statistics
Season	GP	Tackles					Interceptions					Fumbles			
Season	GP	Solo	Ast	Cmb	TfL	Sck	Int	Yds	Avg	TD	PD	FF	FR	Yds	TD
2016	0	Redshirt													
2017	6	13	3	16	3.0	**1.0**	2	17	8.5	0	7	**1**	0	0	0
2018	14	**37**	**21**	**58**	**4.0**	0.0	**4**	**78**	**19.5**	**1**	**13**	**1**	0	0	0
Career	20	50	24	74	7.0	1.0	6	95	28.0	1	20	2	0	0	0
