= Chase Edmonds =

American football player (born 1996)

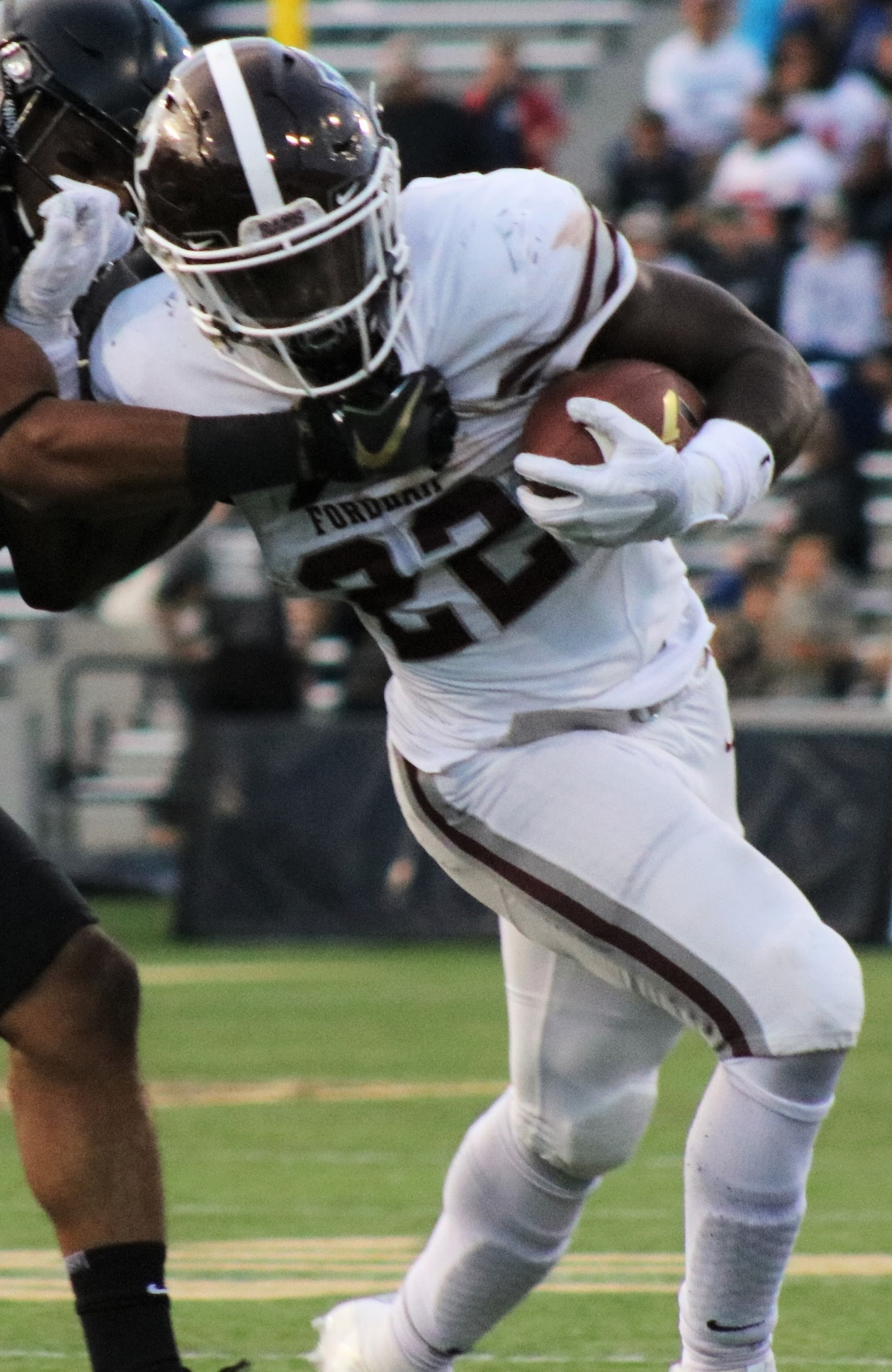
- Edmonds with the Fordham Rams in 2017

Profile
- Position: Running back

Personal information
- Born: April 13, 1996 (age 30); Harrisburg, Pennsylvania, U.S.
- Listed height: 5 ft 9 in (1.75 m)
- Listed weight: 205 lb (93 kg)

Career information
- High school: Central Dauphin East (Harrisburg)
- College: Fordham (2014–2017)
- NFL draft: 2018: 4th round, 134th overall pick

Career history
- Arizona Cardinals (2018–2021); Miami Dolphins (2022); Denver Broncos (2022); Tampa Bay Buccaneers (2023–2024); Washington Commanders (2025)

Awards and highlights
- Jerry Rice Award (2014); Patriot League Offensive Player of the Year (2015); First-team FCS All-American (2016); Second-team FCS All-American (2015); 3× first-team All-Patriot League (2014–2016); Second-team All-Patriot League (2017)

Career NFL statistics as of 2025
- Rushing yards: 1,972
- Rushing average: 4.4
- Rushing touchdowns: 11
- Receptions: 158
- Receiving yards: 1,159
- Receiving touchdowns: 6
- Return yards: 707
- Stats at Pro Football Reference

Chase Edmonds (born April 13, 1996) is an American professional football running back. He played college football for the Fordham Rams and was selected by the Arizona Cardinals in the fourth round of the 2018 NFL draft. Edmonds has also played for the Miami Dolphins, Denver Broncos, Tampa Bay Buccaneers, and Washington Commanders.

== Early life ==
Edmonds grew up in Harrisburg, Pennsylvania and graduated from Central Dauphin East High School, where he played basketball and football for the Panthers. As a senior, Edmonds accumulated 2,378 total yards and 25 touchdowns, including 1,984 rushing yards and was a consensus All-State selection. He was selected to play in the Big 33 Football Classic and was named the game's Most Valuable Player.

Despite his success on the field, he garnered little interest from Football Bowl Subdivision programs due to his size.

== College career ==
Edmonds played for Fordham from 2014 to 2017. As a freshman, Edmonds played in 14 games rushing for 1,838 yards on 294 attempts for 23 touchdowns with an average of 6.3 yards per carry, and received for 121 yards on 19 attempts for one touchdown. For these efforts, he won the 2014 Jerry Rice Award, which is the NCAA's Football Championship Subdivision (FCS) Rookie of the Year Award. In his sophomore season, Edmonds played in 12 games had 1,648 yards for 251 attempts and had 20 touchdowns along with five receiving touchdowns. In his junior year, Edmonds played in 11 games rushing for 1,799 yards on 257 attempts and had 19 touchdowns with 1 receiving touchdown. Against Lafayette, Edmonds set an FCS record by averaging 21.1 yards per carry (359 yards on 17 carries). In his final season with the Rams, Edmonds was injured and only played in seven games, rushing for 577 yards on 136 attempts with five touchdowns. Against Holy Cross, Edmonds set the Patriot League career rushing record. Edmonds finished his college career ranked fifth in NCAA FCS history with 5,862 career rushing yards. He graduated with a degree in Communications.

== Professional career ==
Pre-draft measurables
Height	Weight	Arm length	Hand span	40-yard dash	10-yard split	20-yard split	20-yard shuttle	Three-cone drill	Vertical jump	Broad jump	Bench press
5 ft 9 1/8 in (1.76 m)	205 lb (93 kg)	31 1/8 in (0.79 m)	9 1/8 in (0.23 m)	4.55 s	1.58 s	2.66 s	4.07 s	6.79 s	34 in (0.86 m)	10 ft 2 in (3.10 m)	19 reps
All values from NFL Combine

=== Arizona Cardinals ===
Edmonds was selected by the Arizona Cardinals in the fourth round (134th overall) of the 2018 NFL draft. On May 11, 2018, he signed his rookie contract. Edmonds made his NFL debut on September 9, 2018, in a 24–6 loss to the Washington Redskins, rushing four times for 24 yards and catching four passes for 24 yards. Edmonds scored his first two professional touchdowns on December 2, 2018, in a 20–17 win over the Green Bay Packers. Overall, he finished his rookie season with 60 carries for 208 yards and two touchdowns.

During Week 7 of the 2019 season against the New York Giants, Edmonds posted his first career 100+-yard game as he finished with 126 rushing yards with three touchdowns, helping the Cardinals win 27–21. Overall, in the 2019 season, Edmonds finished with 303 rushing yards and four rushing touchdowns to go along with 12 receptions for 105 receiving yards and one receiving touchdown.

In Week 7 of the 2020 season against the Seattle Seahawks, Edmonds recorded 145 yards from scrimmage during the 37–34 overtime win. Edmonds finished the season appearing in sixteen games and starting in two with 97 rushing attempts for 448 yards and one rushing touchdown, and 53 receptions for 402 yards and four receiving touchdowns as well as 18 kick returns for 417 yards, the longest being 54 yards and the average being 23 yards.

Edmonds entered the 2021 season as the Cardinals starting running back for the first time of his career, ahead of free agent signee James Conner. He started the first nine games before suffering a high ankle sprain in Week 9. He was placed on injured reserve on November 13, 2021. He was activated on December 18. He finished the season second on the team behind Conner with a career-high 592 rushing yards and two touchdowns along with 43 catches for 311 yards.

=== Miami Dolphins ===
On March 14, 2022, Edmonds signed with the Miami Dolphins on a two-year, $12.6 million contract.

=== Denver Broncos ===
On November 1, 2022, the Dolphins traded Edmonds along with a 2023 first-round pick and a 2024 fourth-round pick to the Denver Broncos in exchange for outside linebacker Bradley Chubb and a 2025 fifth-round pick. He suffered a high ankle sprain in Week 11 and was placed on injured reserve on November 22. He was activated on December 24. In his time with both the Dolphins and Broncos, he had 68 carries for 245 rushing yards and two rushing touchdowns to go with 16 receptions for 157 receiving yards and one receiving touchdown.

On March 13, 2023, Edmonds was released by the Broncos.

=== Tampa Bay Buccaneers ===
On March 20, 2023, Edmonds signed a one-year contract with the Tampa Bay Buccaneers. He was placed on injured reserve on September 20. He was activated on October 25. He finished the 2023 season with 49 carries for 176 rushing yards to go with 14 receptions for 81 receiving yards.

On March 13, 2024, Edmonds re-signed with the Buccaneers. He was placed on injured reserve on August 27.

=== Washington Commanders ===
On September 15, 2025, Edmonds signed with the practice squad of the Washington Commanders. The Commanders promoted him to the active roster on December 10.

== Career statistics ==
=== NFL ===
Regular season
Year	Team	Games		Rushing					Receiving					Fumbles	
Year	Team	GP	GS	Att	Yds	Avg	Lng	TD	Rec	Yds	Avg	Lng	TD	Fum	Lost
2018	ARI	16	0	60	208	3.5	29	2	20	103	5.2	13	0	1	0
2019	ARI	13	2	60	303	5.1	37	4	12	105	8.8	31	1	0	0
2020	ARI	16	2	97	448	4.6	32	1	53	402	7.6	30	4	2	0
2021	ARI	12	11	116	592	5.1	54	2	43	311	7.2	36	0	1	1
2022	MIA	8	2	42	120	2.9	28	2	10	96	9.6	15	1	0	0
2022	DEN	5	1	26	125	4.8	25	0	6	61	10.2	27	0	0	0
2023	TB	13	0	49	176	3.6	21	0	14	81	5.8	14	0	0	0
2024	TB	0	0	Did not play due to injury											
2025	WAS	3	0	—	—	—	—	—	—	—	—	—	—	0	0
Career		86	18	450	1,972	4.4	54	11	158	1,159	7.3	36	6	4	1

Postseason
Year	Team	Games		Rushing					Receiving					Fumbles	
Year	Team	GP	GS	Att	Yds	Avg	Lng	TD	Rec	Yds	Avg	Lng	TD	Fum	Lost
2021	ARI	1	1	8	28	3.5	10	0	0	0	0.0	0	0	0	0
2023	TB	2	0	11	31	2.8	9	0	3	26	8.7	14	0	0	0
2024	TB	0	0	Did not play due to injury											
Career		3	1	19	59	3.1	10	0	3	26	8.7	14	0	0	0

=== College ===
Season	Team	GP	Rushing				Receiving		
Season	Team	GP	Att	Yds	Avg	TD	Rec	Yds	TD
2014	Fordham	14	294	1,838	6.3	23	19	121	1
2015	Fordham	12	251	1,648	6.6	20	31	383	5
2016	Fordham	11	257	1,799	7.0	19	25	272	1
2017	Fordham	7	136	577	4.2	5	11	129	0
Career		44	938	5,862	6.2	67	86	905	7

== Personal life ==
Edmonds has a daughter named Avery.
