= Aaron Brewer (long snapper) =

American football player (born 1990)

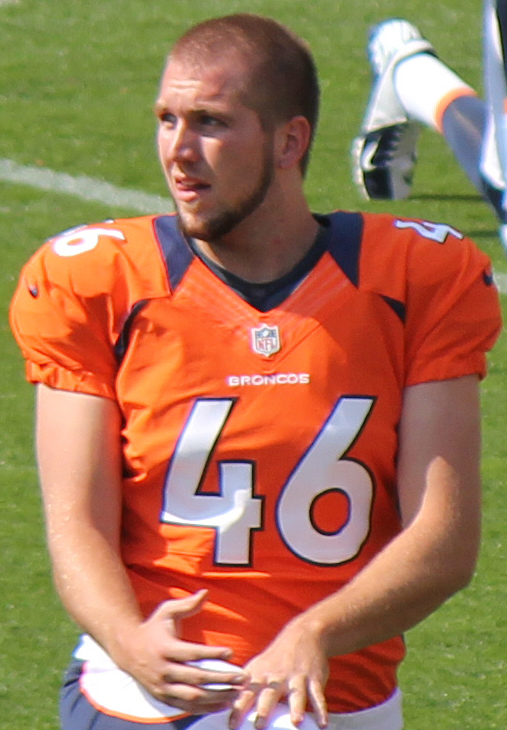
- Brewer with the Denver Broncos in 2012

Profile
- Position: Long snapper

Personal information
- Born: July 5, 1990 (age 36); Orange, California, U.S.
- Listed height: 6 ft 5 in (1.96 m)
- Listed weight: 232 lb (105 kg)

Career information
- High school: Troy (Fullerton, California)
- College: San Diego State (2008–2011)
- NFL draft: 2012: undrafted

Career history
- Denver Broncos (2012–2015); Chicago Bears (2016)*; Arizona Cardinals (2016–2025)
- * Offseason or practice squad member only

Awards and highlights
- Super Bowl champion (50)

Career NFL statistics as of 2025
- Games played: 213
- Total tackles: 20
- Stats at Pro Football Reference

Aaron Brewer (born July 5, 1990) is an American professional football long snapper. Brewer signed with the Denver Broncos as an undrafted free agent in 2012. He played college football for the San Diego State Aztecs.

== College career ==
Brewer played long snapper at San Diego State University. In his junior year, he played in 13 games and recorded five tackles for the season. In his sophomore year, he played in all 12 games of the season as a long snapper. He also recorded four tackles for the entire year. In his freshman year, he played in 12 games along with one tackle.

== Professional career ==
Pre-draft measurables
Height	Weight	40-yard dash	10-yard split	20-yard split	20-yard shuttle	Three-cone drill	Vertical jump	Broad jump	Bench press
6 ft 5 in (1.96 m)	235 lb (107 kg)	4.96 s	1.68 s	2.82 s	4.48 s	7.27 s	27.5 in (0.70 m)	8 ft 6 in (2.59 m)	10 reps
All values from Pro Day

=== Denver Broncos ===
On May 3, 2012, Brewer signed with the Denver Broncos as an undrafted free agent.

Brewer was the long snapper for Matt Prater’s NFL record 64-yard field goal on December 8, 2013.

On February 7, 2016, Brewer was part of the Broncos team that won Super Bowl 50. In the game, the Broncos defeated the Carolina Panthers by a score of 24–10.

On March 8, 2016, the Broncos released Brewer along with tight end Owen Daniels and right guard Louis Vasquez.

=== Chicago Bears ===
On March 16, 2016, Brewer signed with the Chicago Bears on a one-year deal. On September 5, 2016, Brewer was released by the Bears.

=== Arizona Cardinals ===
On September 28, 2016, Brewer was signed by the Arizona Cardinals.

On October 10, 2017, Brewer was placed on injured reserve after suffering a wrist injury. He was activated off injured reserve to the active roster on December 15, 2017.

On March 7, 2018, Brewer signed a four-year contract extension to remain with the Cardinals.

On November 11, 2021, Brewer was placed on injured reserve after suffering a broken arm in Week 9. He was activated on December 13.

On March 17, 2022, Brewer re-signed with the Cardinals on a one-year deal. He was released during final roster cuts on August 30. He was placed on injured reserve on December 26, with a chest injury.

On June 6, 2023, Brewer re–signed with the Cardinals, with the expectation that he would compete with undrafted free agent Matt Hembrough.

On March 7, 2025, Brewer re-signed with the Cardinals on a one-year deal.

== Personal life ==
He married Nicole Brewer on June 2, 2018.
