= Marco Wilson =

American football player (born 1999)

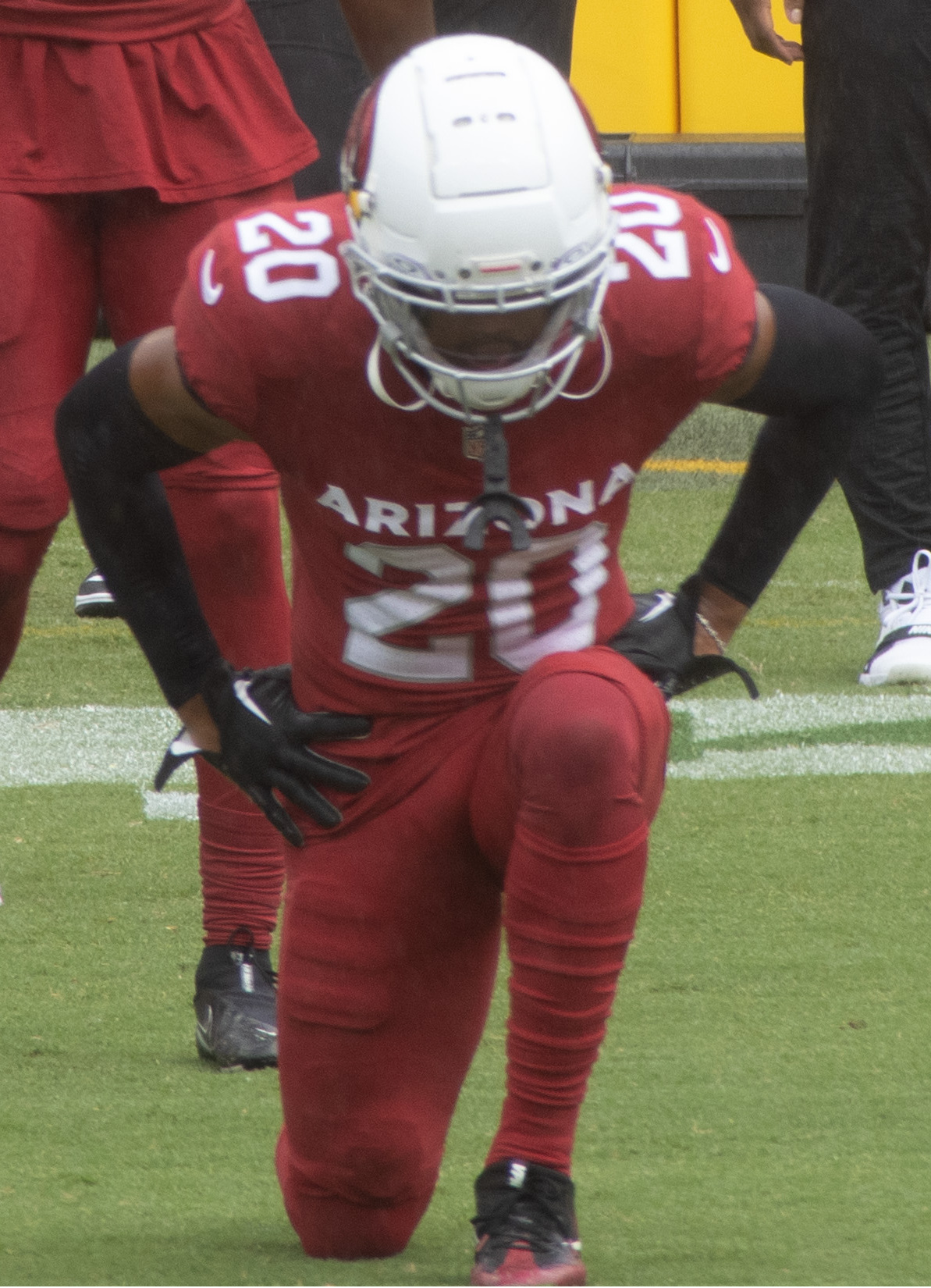
- Wilson with the Arizona Cardinals in 2023

No. 35 – Carolina Panthers
- Position: Cornerback
- Roster status: Active

Personal information
- Born: March 3, 1999 (age 27); Fort Lauderdale, Florida, U.S.
- Listed height: 5 ft 11 in (1.80 m)
- Listed weight: 185 lb (84 kg)

Career information
- High school: American Heritage (Fort Lauderdale)
- College: Florida (2017–2020)
- NFL draft: 2021: 4th round, 136th overall pick

Career history
- Arizona Cardinals (2021–2023); New England Patriots (2023–2024); Cincinnati Bengals (2024–2025); Miami Dolphins (2026)*; Carolina Panthers (2026–present)
- * Offseason or practice squad member only

Career NFL statistics as of Week 8, 2026
- Total tackles: 186
- Forced fumbles: 3
- Pass deflections: 22
- Interceptions: 3
- Defensive touchdowns: 1
- Stats at Pro Football Reference

Marco Wilson (born March 3, 1999) is an American professional football cornerback for the Carolina Panthers of the National Football League (NFL). He played college football for the Florida Gators and was selected by the Arizona Cardinals in the fourth round of the 2021 NFL draft. He has also played for the New England Patriots and Cincinnati Bengals.

== Early life ==
Wilson grew up in Fort Lauderdale, Florida, and attended the American Heritage School. He committed to play college football at Florida over offers from the University of Miami, Georgia, Ohio State and Southern California. He is of Trinidadian descent through his father, and Puerto Rican through his mother.

== College career ==
Wilson started as a true freshman and recorded 34 tackles and 10 passes broken up. He was named preseason third-team All-SEC going into his sophomore year but tore his ACL two games into the season and redshirted the rest of the season. As a redshirt sophomore, he recorded 36 tackles, 2.5 tackles for a loss, 3 interceptions and 2 passes broken up.

As a senior in 2020, he recorded 24 tackles. He also had a fumble recovery against Texas A&M.

Late in the December 12 game against the LSU Tigers, Wilson tackled LSU tight end Kole Taylor by the legs and pulled his shoe off in the process. In what Wilson admitted was a moment of adrenaline from being "super excited", he celebrated the play by throwing the shoe downfield, resulting in an unsportsmanlike conduct penalty that gave LSU a first down. LSU would go on to win the game after kicking a field goal later that drive, beating the Gators 37–34. Wilson was ridiculed for the gesture and took responsibility for it as "silly mistakes like that can affect not only just you but a lot of people around you." He acknowledged its humor in retrospect, comparing it to the George W. Bush shoe-throwing incident.

== Professional career ==
Pre-draft measurables
Height	Weight	Arm length	Hand span	Wingspan	40-yard dash	10-yard split	20-yard split	20-yard shuttle	Three-cone drill	Vertical jump	Broad jump	Bench press
5 ft 11 5/8 in (1.82 m)	191 lb (87 kg)	30 3/4 in (0.78 m)	9 5/8 in (0.24 m)	6 ft 1 1/2 in (1.87 m)	4.34 s	1.49 s	2.51 s	4.09 s	6.80 s	43.5 in (1.10 m)	11 ft 4 in (3.45 m)	26 reps
All values from Pro Day

=== Arizona Cardinals ===
Wilson was drafted by the Arizona Cardinals in the fourth round with the 136th overall pick of the 2021 NFL draft. On May 20, 2021, Wilson signed his four-year rookie contract with Arizona. Wilson entered his rookie season in 2021 as a starting cornerback alongside Byron Murphy. He finished the season with 48 tackles, two forced fumbles, and two passes defensed through 14 games and 13 starts.

In Week 7 of the 2022 season, Wilson had a 38-yard interception return for a touchdown, along with three tackles and two pass breakups, in a 42-34 win over the New Orleans Saints, earning NFC Defensive Player of the Week.

Wilson was released on December 26, 2023.

=== New England Patriots ===
On December 27, 2023, Wilson was claimed off waivers by the New England Patriots. He was waived on November 18, 2024.

=== Cincinnati Bengals ===
On November 19, 2024, Wilson was claimed off waivers by the Cincinnati Bengals.

Wilson re-signed with the Bengals on March 12, 2025. He began the season as one of Cincinnati's reserve defensive backs. In four appearances for the team, he recorded three combined tackles. Wilson was placed on injured reserve on November 26, due to a hamstring injury he suffered in Week 12 against the New England Patriots.

=== Miami Dolphins ===
On March 13, 2026, the Miami Dolphins signed Wilson to a one-year contract. On August 30, he was released by the Dolphins as a part of final roster cuts.

=== Carolina Panthers ===
On October 6, 2026, Wilson was signed to the Carolina Panthers practice squad. After being elevated and starting three straight games for the team, Wilson was signed to the active roster on November 16.

== Personal life ==
Wilson's brother, Quincy Wilson, also played football at Florida and in the NFL.

== See also ==
- List of shoe-throwing incidents
