= Max Garcia =

American football player (born 1991)

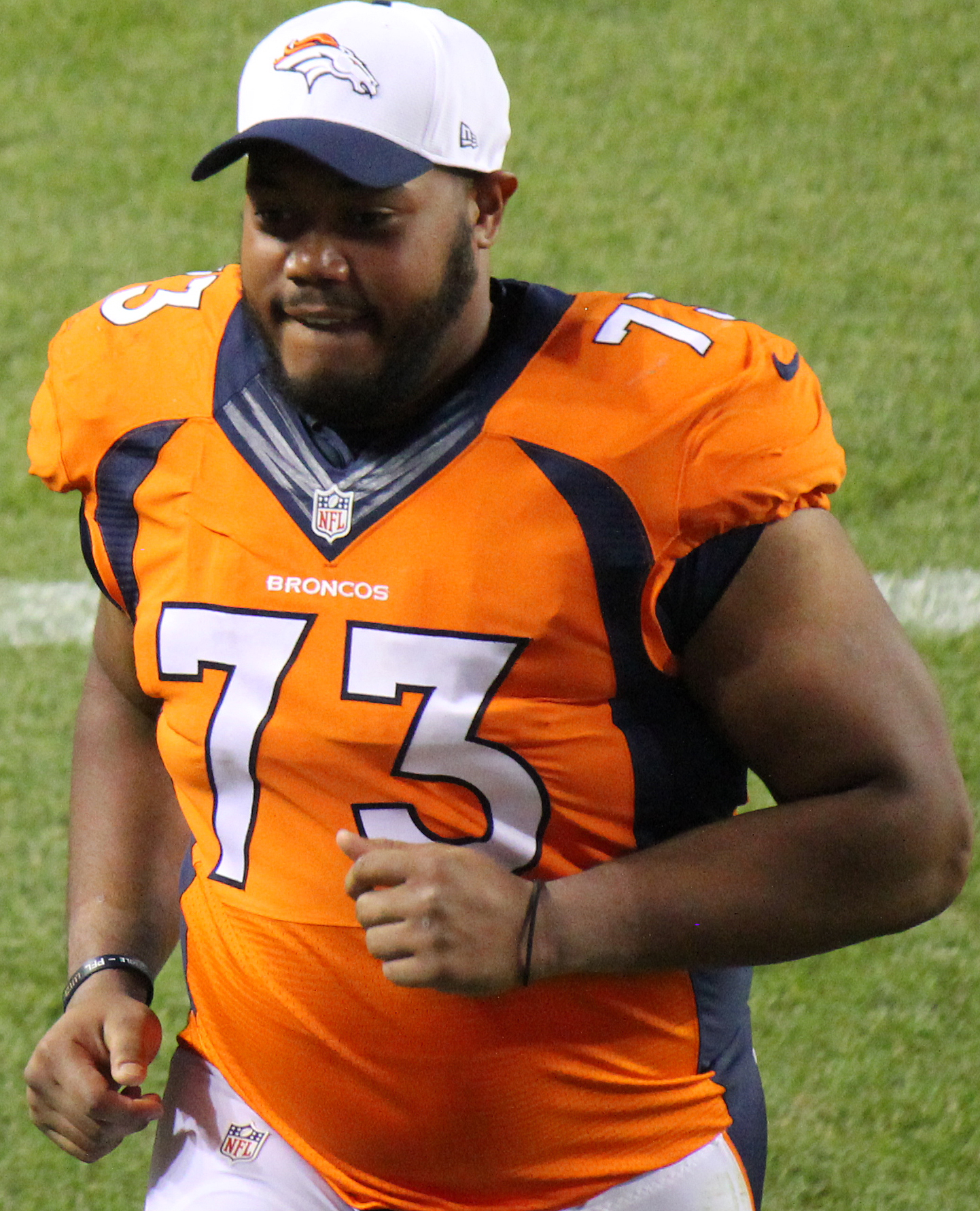
- Garcia with the Denver Broncos in 2015

Profile
- Position: Guard

Personal information
- Born: November 9, 1991 (age 35); Norcross, Georgia, U.S.
- Listed height: 6 ft 4 in (1.93 m)
- Listed weight: 309 lb (140 kg)

Career information
- High school: Norcross (GA)
- College: Florida
- NFL draft: 2015: 4th round, 133rd overall pick

Career history
- Denver Broncos (2015–2018); Arizona Cardinals (2019–2021); New York Giants (2022)*; Arizona Cardinals (2022); New Orleans Saints (2023)
- * Offseason or practice squad member only

Awards and highlights
- Super Bowl champion (50); Second-team All-SEC (2014)

Career NFL statistics as of 2023
- Games played: 122
- Games started: 62
- Stats at Pro Football Reference

Max Garcia (born November 9, 1991) is an American professional football guard. He played college football for the Florida Gators and was recognized as second-team All-SEC in 2014. He was selected by the Denver Broncos of the National Football League (NFL) in the fourth round, 133rd overall, in the 2015 NFL draft.

== Early life ==
Garcia was named honorable mention Class 5A All-Georgia his senior year at Norcross High School. He also competed in the shot put and discus throw events. Garcia traveled to Australia in the summer of 2009 to compete in World Track meet.

== College career ==
Garcia originally attended the University of Maryland before transferring to the University of Florida. He redshirted in 2012 due to NCAA transfer rules, and started 12 games at left tackle for Maryland in 2011. Garcia started 37 of 39 games played at Florida and Maryland, earning starts at left tackle, left guard and center. He was voted second-team All-Southeastern Conference (SEC) as a senior at Florida after starting all 13 games at center for the Gators following an offseason transition from left tackle and left guard. Garcia graded out to more than 97 percent in his 757 snaps played, and was on the Rimington Trophy (nation’s top center) watch list. He was named SEC Offensive Lineman of the Week on two occasions. Garcia started all 12 games and saw action at both left tackle and left guard in his first year competing with the Gators, and anchored the offensive line after being the only starter to not miss time due to injury.

Garcia played in the 2015 Senior Bowl and Medal of Honor Bowl following his collegiate career.

== Professional career ==
Pre-draft measurables
Height	Weight	Arm length	Hand span	40-yard dash	20-yard shuttle	Three-cone drill	Vertical jump	Broad jump	Bench press
6 ft 4 1/8 in (1.93 m)	309 lb (140 kg)	33 1/8 in (0.84 m)	10 1/4 in (0.26 m)	5.24 s	5.12 s	8.18 s	28.0 in (0.71 m)	8 ft 7 in (2.62 m)	30 reps
All values from NFL Combine/Pro Day

=== Denver Broncos ===
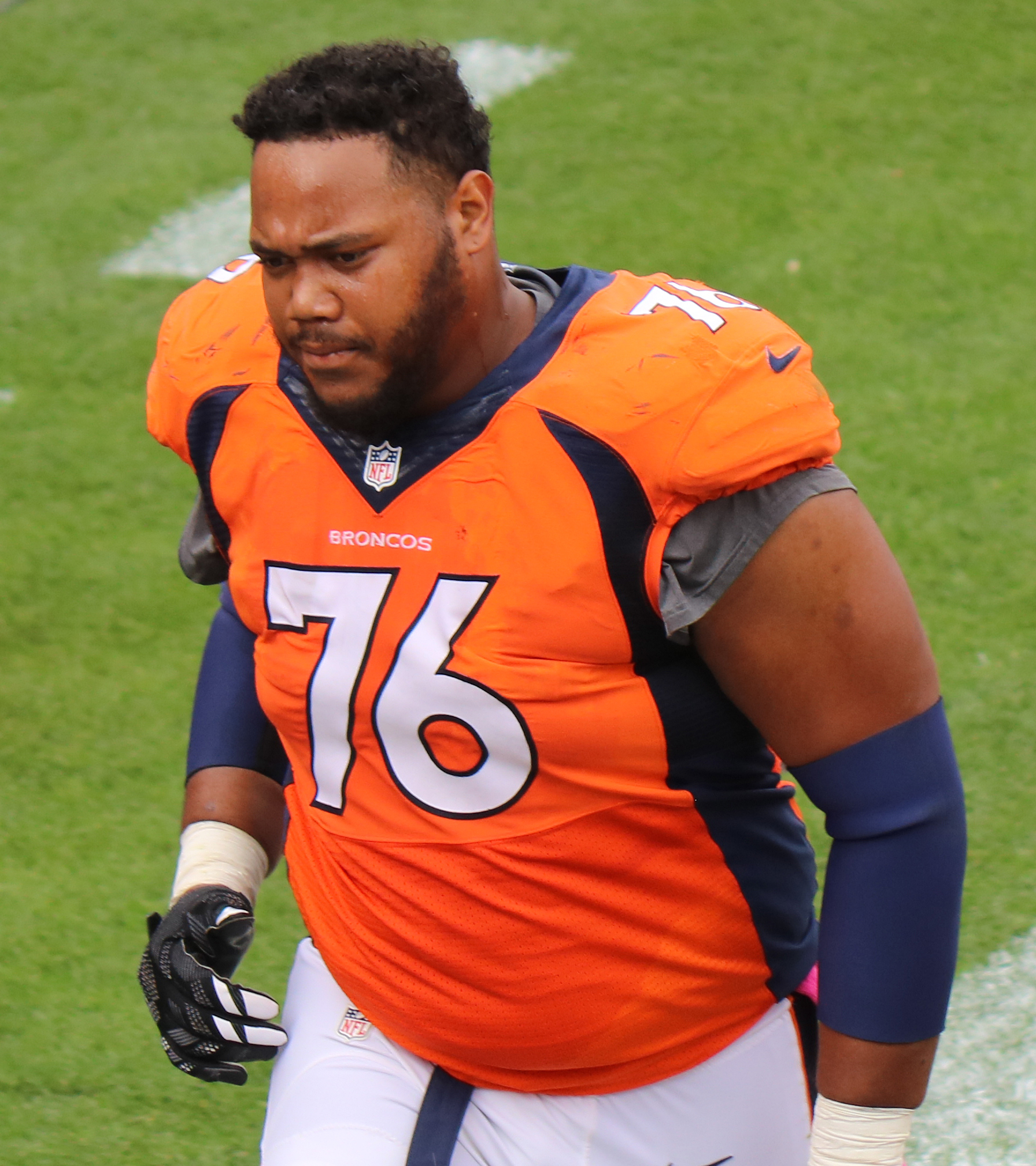
Garcia in 2016

=== 2015 season ===
Garcia was selected by the Broncos in the fourth round, 133rd overall, in the 2015 NFL draft. Garcia appeared in all 16 regular-season games (five starts) and all three postseason games, seeing time at both guard positions. He made his NFL debut vs. the Baltimore Ravens on September 13, 2015. Garcia made his first start at left guard vs. the New England Patriots on November 29, 2015, seeing action in all 79 offensive snaps at both guard spots.

On February 7, 2016, Garcia was part of the Broncos team that won Super Bowl 50. In the game, the Broncos defeated the Carolina Panthers by a score of 24–10.

=== 2016 season ===
Garcia was named the starting left guard for the 2016 season by head coach Gary Kubiak. Garcia started all 16 games and played every offensive snap. He allowed just three sacks in 16 games and was called for holding just twice.

=== 2017 season ===
Garcia was again named starting left guard by new head coach Vance Joseph for the 2017 season. He started all 16 games at left guard for the second consecutive season. He was called for holding only one time and allowed four sacks.

=== 2018 season ===
After two straight seasons as a starter, Garcia was demoted to a backup role to start the season as Ronald Leary was named the starting left guard and Connor McGovern was named the starter on the right side. He started his first game of the season at right guard in Week 6 after struggles from McGovern. He was moved over to left guard the following week after Leary suffered a torn Achilles. He started the next three games there before suffering a torn ACL in practice prior to Week 11. He was placed on injured reserve on November 20, 2018.

=== Arizona Cardinals (first stint) ===
On March 14, 2019, Garcia signed with the Arizona Cardinals. He was placed on the reserve/physically unable to perform (PUP) list to start the season while recovering from knee surgery. He was activated off PUP on November 6.

On March 26, 2020, Garcia was re-signed to a one-year contract by the Cardinals. On March 25, 2021, Garcia was re-signed to another one-year contract by the Cardinals.

=== New York Giants ===
On March 28, 2022, the New York Giants signed Garcia to a one-year contract. He was released on August 31, 2022 and re-signed to the practice squad.

=== Arizona Cardinals (second stint) ===
On September 10, 2022, the Cardinals signed Garcia off the Giants practice squad.

=== New Orleans Saints ===
On July 25, 2023, the New Orleans Saints signed Garcia.

== Personal life ==
Max Garcia's father is Mexican and his mother is of Puerto Rican descent. Garcia is a Christian.

Garcia majored in family, youth and community sciences at Florida.
