= Antoine Wesley =

American football player (born 1997)

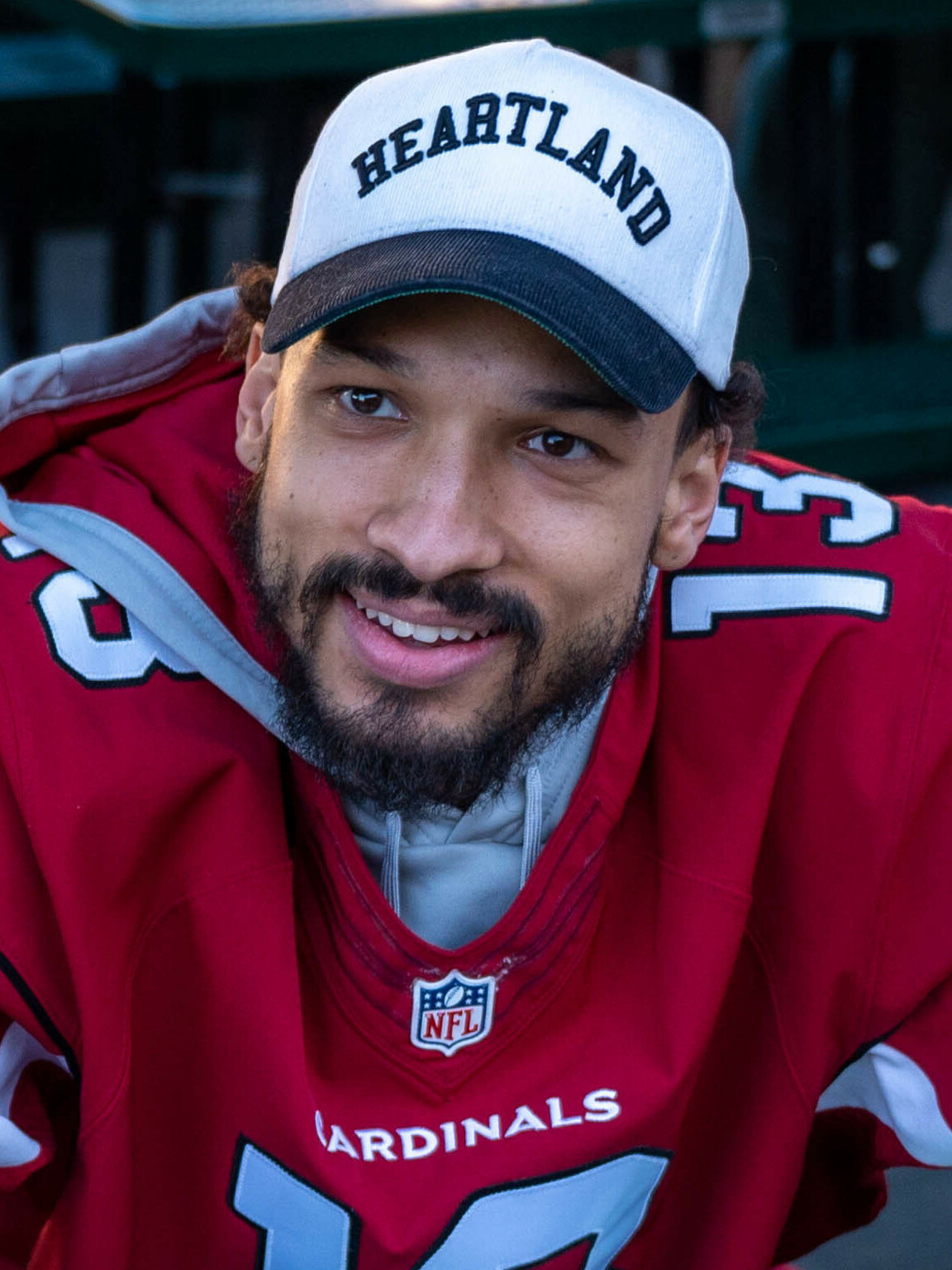
- Wesley in 2023

Profile
- Position: Wide receiver

Personal information
- Born: October 22, 1997 (age 29); Las Vegas, Nevada, U.S.
- Listed height: 6 ft 4 in (1.93 m)
- Listed weight: 206 lb (93 kg)

Career information
- High school: Cibolo Steele (Cibolo, Texas)
- College: Texas Tech
- NFL draft: 2019: undrafted

Career history
- Baltimore Ravens (2019–2020)*; Arizona Cardinals (2021–2022); Las Vegas Raiders (2023)*
- * Offseason or practice squad member only

Awards and highlights
- First-team All-American (2018); First-team All-Big 12 (2018)

Career NFL statistics
- Receptions: 19
- Receiving yards: 208
- Receiving touchdowns: 3
- Stats at Pro Football Reference

Antoine Wesley (born October 22, 1997) is an American professional football wide receiver. He played college football for the Texas Tech Red Raiders.

== Early life ==
Wesley attended Cibolo Steele in Cibolo, Texas. During his career he had 74 receptions for 1,192 yards and 15 touchdowns. He committed to Texas Tech University to play college football.

== College career ==
Wesley had 10 receptions for 137 yards combined his first two years at Texas Tech. As a junior in 2018, he was named an All-American after he had 88 receptions for 1,410 yards and nine touchdowns. During the season, he set a school record for receiving yards in a game with 261. Wesley entered the 2019 NFL draft after the season.

== Professional career ==
Pre-draft measurables
Height	Weight	Arm length	Hand span	Wingspan	40-yard dash	10-yard split	20-yard split	20-yard shuttle	Three-cone drill	Vertical jump	Broad jump	Bench press
6 ft 4 1/8 in (1.93 m)	206 lb (93 kg)	34 in (0.86 m)	9 3/4 in (0.25 m)	6 ft 7 3/4 in (2.03 m)	4.68 s	1.69 s	2.77 s	4.26 s	7.07 s	37.0 in (0.94 m)	9 ft 9 in (2.97 m)	6 reps
All values from NFL Combine/Pro Day

=== Baltimore Ravens ===
Wesley signed with the Baltimore Ravens as an undrafted free agent on May 3, 2019. He was waived on August 31, 2019, and was signed to the practice squad the next day. He signed a reserve/future contract with the Ravens on January 13, 2020.

On August 22, 2020, Wesley was placed on injured reserve with a shoulder injury.

=== Arizona Cardinals ===
On May 21, 2021, Wesley signed with the Arizona Cardinals. He was named the Cardinals fifth wide receiver on the depth chart to begin the 2021 season. He scored his first career touchdown in Week 16 on a 24-yard pass from Kyler Murray. He finished the season with 19 catches for 208 yards and three touchdowns.

On September 1, 2022, Wesley was placed on injured reserve with a quadriceps tear.

=== Las Vegas Raiders ===
On August 30, 2023, Wesley was signed to the Las Vegas Raiders practice squad. He was released on September 5, 2023.
