= Charles Washington (defensive back, born 1993) =

American football player (born 1993)

No. 45, 28
- Position: Safety

Personal information
- Born: March 10, 1993 (age 33); Encino, California, U.S.
- Listed height: 5 ft 10 in (1.78 m)
- Listed weight: 192 lb (87 kg)

Career information
- High school: Crespi Carmelite (Encino)
- College: Fresno State (2012–2015)
- NFL draft: 2016: undrafted

Career history
- Detroit Lions (2016–2018); Arizona Cardinals (2019–2022)

Career NFL statistics
- Total tackles: 44
- Forced fumbles: 1
- Pass deflections: 1
- Stats at Pro Football Reference

Charles Washington (born March 10, 1993) is an American former professional football player who was a safety in the National Football League (NFL). He played college football for the Fresno State Bulldogs and signed with the Detroit Lions as an undrafted free agent after the 2016 NFL draft.

== Early life ==
Washington played high school football at Crespi Carmelite High School in Encino, California. He recorded 57 solo tackles, 29 tackle assists, 5 interceptions, 7 rushing attempts, 123 rushing yards and 4 touchdowns his senior year in 2010, earning league defensive MVP honors.

== College career ==
Washington played for the Fresno State Bulldogs of Fresno State University from 2012 to 2015. He was redshirted in 2011. He played in 12 games in 2012, recording 8 solo tackles, 5 tackle assists, 2 pass breakups and 1 fumble recovery. Washington also returned a blocked extra point attempt for two points. He earned Mountain West (MW) All-Academic honors in 2012. He started all 13 games in 2013, totaling 50 solo tackles, 21 tackle assists, 2 sacks, 1 interception, 2 pass breakups and 1 forced fumble. Washington started the first 11 games of the season at strong safety and the final 2 at cornerback. He garnered MW All-Academic recognition. He started all 14 games in 2014, recording 61 solo tackles, 17 tackle assists, half a sack, 2 interceptions, 7 pass breakups and 1 fumble recovery. Washington started seven games at cornerback, six at safety and one at nickelback. He earned MW All-Academic honors in 2014. He played in 11 games, all starts, in 2015, totaling 31 solo tackles, 9 tackle assists, 1 sack and 6 pass breakups. Washington's first four starts of 2015 were at cornerback while his last seven were at strong safety. He missed one game due to injury. He garnered MW All-Academic recognition in 2015. Washington played in 50 games, starting 38, during his college career, recording 202 total tackles and 3 interceptions. He participated in the NFLPA Collegiate Bowl in January 2016. He majored in criminology corrections at Fresno State.

== Professional career ==
Washington was rated the 64th best cornerback in the 2016 NFL draft by NFLDraftScout.com.

Pre-draft measurables
Height	Weight	Arm length	Hand span	40-yard dash	10-yard split	20-yard split	20-yard shuttle	Three-cone drill	Vertical jump	Broad jump	Bench press
5 ft 10 1/4 in (1.78 m)	190 lb (86 kg)	30 3/8 in (0.77 m)	9 5/8 in (0.24 m)	4.48 s	1.58 s	2.56 s	4.48 s	7.23 s	41 in (1.04 m)	10 ft 5 in (3.18 m)	18 reps
All values from Fresno State's Pro Day

=== Detroit Lions ===
After going undrafted, Washington signed with the Detroit Lions on May 6, 2016. He was waived by the Lions on September 3 and signed to the team's practice squad on September 4. He was released on October 12 and signed to the Lions' practice squad on October 17, 2016. He signed a reserve/future contract with the Lions on January 9, 2017.

In 2018, Washington played in 13 games before being placed on injured reserve on December 22, 2018.

On August 31, 2019, Washington was waived by the Lions.

=== Arizona Cardinals ===
On September 1, 2019, Washington was claimed off waivers by the Arizona Cardinals.

On March 27, 2020, Washington was re-signed by the Cardinals.

On March 29, 2021, Washington re-signed with the Cardinals on a one-year contract. He was placed on injured reserve on September 29, 2021 with a hamstring injury. He was activated on December 18.

On May 2, 2022, Washington re-signed with the Cardinals. He was placed on injured reserve on September 1, 2022. He was activated on November 12.
