= 2018 Arizona Cardinals season =

99th season in franchise history

- Owner: Bill Bidwill
- General manager: Steve Keim
- Head coach: Steve Wilks
- Home stadium: State Farm Stadium

Results
- Record: 3–13
- Division place: 4th NFC West
- Playoffs: Did not qualify
- Pro Bowlers: CB Patrick Peterson
- Team MVP: Larry Fitzgerald
- Team ROY: Christian Kirk

Uniform
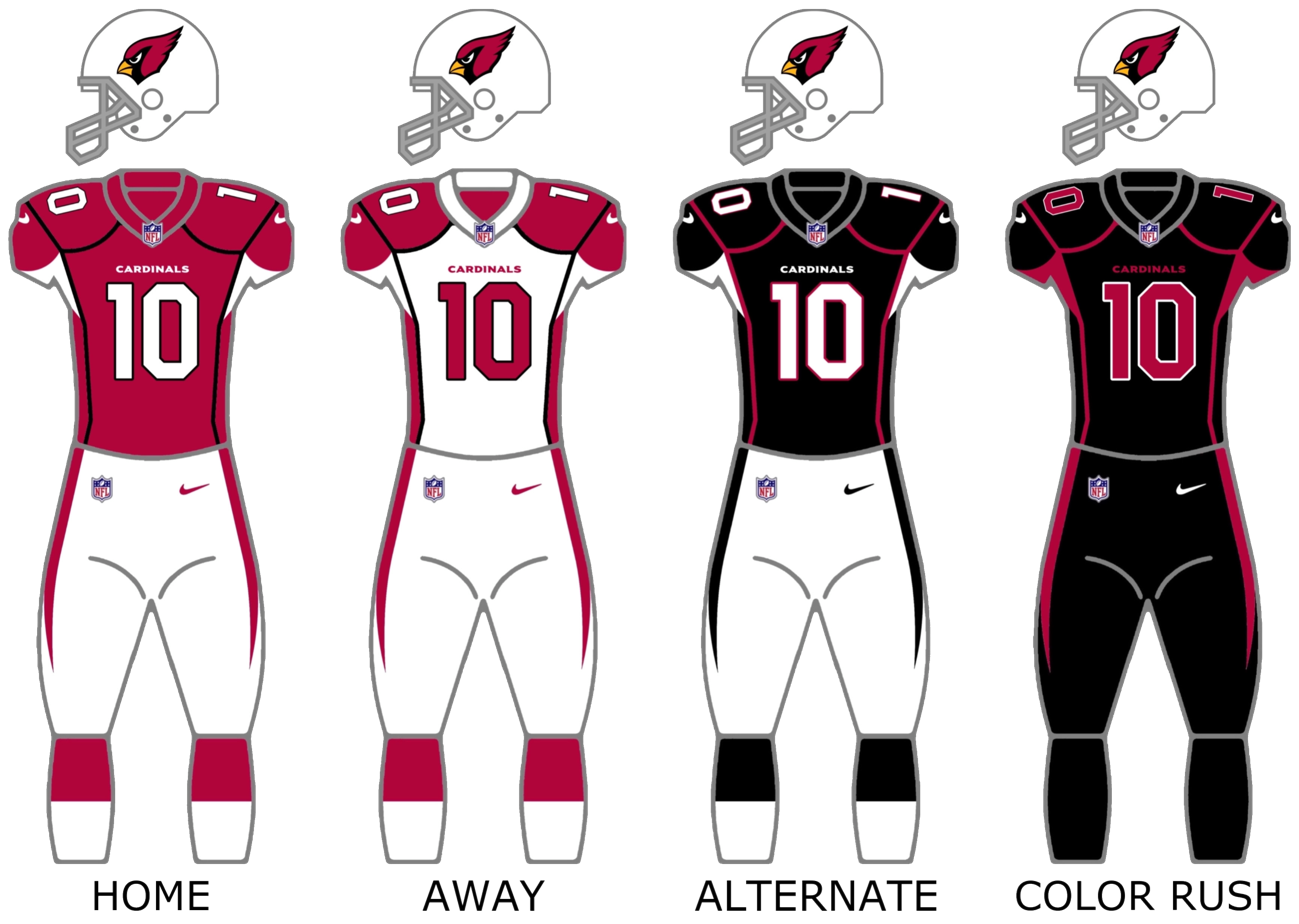

The 2018 season was the Arizona Cardinals' 99th in the National Football League (NFL), their 31st in Arizona, and their only season under head coach Steve Wilks. During the off-season, State Farm purchased the naming rights to the Cardinals' home stadium and it was renamed from University of Phoenix Stadium to State Farm Stadium. Although former head coach Bruce Arians retired before the season began, he came out of retirement on January 8, 2019 to become the new coach of the Tampa Bay Buccaneers.

Carson Palmer, the starting quarterback for the previous five seasons, retired in the offseason. To replace him, the Cardinals signed veteran quarterbacks Sam Bradford and Mike Glennon, also selecting Josh Rosen in the first round of the draft. While Rosen took over the starting job by week 4, he and Bradford struggled throughout the season with Glennon only playing sparingly. All three quarterbacks were released or traded by the Cardinals during or after the season.

With a Week 14 loss to the Detroit Lions, the Cardinals had their first double digit loss season since 2012 and were eliminated from playoff contention for the third consecutive season. One highlight of the Cardinals' 2018 season was their first ever victory against the Green Bay Packers at Lambeau Field, which also resulted in the firing of Packers head coach Mike McCarthy after a nearly 13-year tenure. They finished the season 3–13, their worst record since 2000. The Cardinals also tallied a 1–7 record at home, the worst in franchise history until it was tied by four years later. Head coach Steve Wilks was fired the day after the season ended. The Cardinals finished last place in the division for the first time since 2012.

This was also the last full season under the ownership of Bill Bidwill, who died during the 2019 season.

== Draft ==
2018 Arizona Cardinals Draft
Round	Selection	Player	Position	College	Notes
1	10	Josh Rosen	QB	UCLA	From Oakland
2	47	Christian Kirk	WR	Texas A&M	
3	97	Mason Cole	C	Michigan	Compensatory pick
4	134	Chase Edmonds	RB	Fordham	Compensatory pick
6	182	Chris Campbell	CB	Penn State	
7	254	Korey Cunningham	G	Cincinnati	Compensatory pick

Draft trades

- The Cardinals traded their fourth-round selection (115th overall), and their second-, fourth- and sixth-round selections in 2017 (45th, 119th and 197th overall) to Chicago in exchange for Chicago's second-round selection in 2017 (36th overall).
- The Cardinals were awarded one third-, one fourth- and one fifth-round compensatory pick (97th, 134th and 254th overall).
- The Cardinals traded their sixth-round selection (189th overall) to New Orleans in exchange for running back Adrian Peterson.
- The Cardinals traded their seventh-round selection (233rd overall) to Kansas City in exchange for cornerback Marcus Cooper.
- The Cardinals traded center Tony Bergstrom to Baltimore in exchange for Baltimore's seventh-round selection (238th overall). However, the trade was voided as the result of Bergstrom not meeting playing time conditions with the Ravens.

=== Undrafted free agents ===
2018 Arizona Cardinals Undrafted Free Agents
Position	Player	College	Notes
DT	Hastin Adams	Mary Hardin-Baylor	
CB	Elijah Battle	West Virginia	
P	Joe Davidson	Bowling Green	
OLB	Dennis Gardeck	Sioux Falls	
LB	Frank Ginda	San Jose State	
DB	AJ Howard	Appalachian State	
DE	Alec James	Wisconsin	
QB	Chad Kanoff	Princeton	
K	Matthew McCrane	Kansas State	
OL	Brant Morris	Toledo	
LB	Mike Needham	Southern Utah	
CB	Deatrick Nichols	South Florida	
T	Austin Olsen	Southern Illinois	
LB	Matt Oplinger	Yale	
S	Jonathan Owens	Missouri Western	
FB	Austin Ramesh	Wisconsin	
WR	Trent Sherfield	Vanderbilt	
S	Andy Smigiera	Robert Morris	
DB	Tavierre Thomas	Ferris State	
WR	Jalen Tolliver	Arkansas-Monticello	
WR	Jonah Trinnaman	BYU	
S	Ezekiel Turner	Washington	
TE	Andrew Vollert	Weber State	
DB	Malcolm Washington	Northern Iowa	
WR	Corey Willis	Central Michigan	

== Staff ==
2018 Arizona Cardinals staff
Front office: Owner/chairman – Bill Bidwill; President – Michael Bidwill; General manager – Steve Keim; Vice president of player personnel – Terry McDonough; Director of college scouting – Dru Grigson; Director of pro scouting – Quentin Harris; Director of football administration – Mike Disner; Director of football operations – Matt Caracciolo; Head coaches: Head coach – Steve Wilks; Assistant to the head coach – Ben Burress; Offensive coaches: Offensive coordinator – Mike McCoy (fired Oct 19, 2018); Quarterbacks – Byron Leftwich (interim Offensive Coordinator); Running backs – Kirby Wilson; Wide receivers – Kevin Garver; Tight ends – Jason Michael; Offensive line – Ray Brown; Assistant offensive line – Steve Heiden; Offensive assistant – Cameron Turner; Offensive quality control – Troy Rothenbuhler; Bill Bidwill Fellowship/assistant running backs – Terry Allen	Defensive coaches: Defensive coordinator – Al Holcomb; Senior assistant/defensive line – Don Johnson; Assistant defensive line – Chris Achuff; Linebackers – Larry Foote; Defensive backs – Dave Merritt; Assistant defensive backs – Charlie Harbison; Defensive quality control – Alonso Escalante; Special teams coaches: Special teams coordinator – Jeff Rodgers; Assistant special teams – Randall McCray; Strength and conditioning: Strength and conditioning – Buddy Morris; Assistant strength and conditioning – Vernon Stephens; Sports science coordinator – Evan Lodder

== Final roster ==
2018 Arizona Cardinals roster
Quarterbacks (QB): 7 Mike Glennon; 3 Josh Rosen; Running backs (RB): 32 Derrick Coleman FB; 29 Chase Edmonds; 31 David Johnson; 22 T. J. Logan; Wide receivers (WR): 12 Pharoh Cooper; 15 Malachi Dupre; 11 Larry Fitzgerald; 14 J. J. Nelson; 16 Trent Sherfield; 17 Jalen Tolliver; 10 Chad Williams; Tight ends (TE): 81 Darrell Daniels; 84 Jermaine Gresham; 82 John Phillips; 86 Ricky Seals-Jones	Offensive linemen (OL): 70 Oday Aboushi G; 60 Joe Barksdale T; 64 Mason Cole C; 75 Zack Golditch G; 78 Colby Gossett G; 69 Will Holden T; 62 Daniel Munyer G/C; 63 Rees Odhiambo G; Defensive linemen (DL): 54 Vontarrius Dora DE; 44 Markus Golden DE; 95 Rodney Gunter DT; 55 Chandler Jones DE; 94 Cameron Malveaux DE; 91 Benson Mayowa DE; 56 Zach Moore DE; 98 Corey Peters DT; 65 Pasoni Tasini DT; 96 Vincent Valentine DT	Linebackers (LB): 20 Deone Bucannon OLB; 92 Dennis Gardeck OLB; 51 Gerald Hodges; 43 Haason Reddick OLB; 47 Ezekiel Turner OLB; 59 Joe Walker MLB; Defensive backs (DB): 38 David Amerson CB; 36 Budda Baker SS; 41 Antoine Bethea FS; 33 Tre Boston SS; 30 Rudy Ford FS; 25 Chris Payton-Jones CB; 21 Patrick Peterson CB; 35 D. J. Swearinger FS; 26 Brandon Williams CB; Special teams (ST): 46 Aaron Brewer LS; 5 Zane Gonzalez K; 2 Andy Lee P	Practice squad: 71 Justin Evans T; 85 Gabe Holmes TE; 66 Will House G; 6 Chad Kanoff QB; 72 Rick Leonard T (IR); 23 Jonathan Moxey CB; 45 Pete Robertson OLB; 61 Coleman Shelton C; 34 Brandon Wilds RB; Reserve: 58 Thurston Armbrister MLB (IR); 57 Josh Bynes MLB (IR); 52 Jeremy Cash OLB (IR); 79 Korey Cunningham T (IR); 4 Phil Dawson K (IR); 37 D. J. Foster RB (IR); 74 D. J. Humphries T (IR); 76 Mike Iupati G (IR); 13 Christian Kirk WR (IR); 50 Gabe Martin OLB (IR); 90 Robert Nkemdiche DT (IR); 42 Jonathan Owens S (IR); -- Olsen Pierre DT (IR); 67 Justin Pugh G (IR); 53 A. Q. Shipley C (IR); 68 Jeremy Vujnovich G (IR); 73 John Wetzel T/G (IR); Rookies in italics 53 active, 18 reserve, 8 practice squad

== Preseason ==
Week	Date	Opponent	Result	Record	Venue	Recap
1	August 11	Los Angeles Chargers	W 24–17	1–0	University of Phoenix Stadium	Recap
2	August 17	at New Orleans Saints	W 20–15	2–0	Mercedes-Benz Superdome	Recap
3	August 26	at Dallas Cowboys	W 27–3	3–0	AT&T Stadium	Recap
4	August 30	Denver Broncos	L 10–21	3–1	University of Phoenix Stadium	Recap

== Regular season ==
=== Schedule ===
Week	Date	Opponent	Result	Record	Venue	Recap
1	September 9	Washington Redskins	**L** 6–24	0–1	State Farm Stadium	Recap
2	September 16	at **Los Angeles Rams**	**L** 0–34	0–2	Los Angeles Memorial Coliseum	Recap
3	September 23	Chicago Bears	**L** 14–16	0–3	State Farm Stadium	Recap
4	September 30	**Seattle Seahawks**	**L** 17–20	0–4	State Farm Stadium	Recap
5	October 7	at **San Francisco 49ers**	**W** 28–18	1–4	Levi's Stadium	Recap
6	October 14	at Minnesota Vikings	**L** 17–27	1–5	U.S. Bank Stadium	Recap
7	October 18	Denver Broncos	**L** 10–45	1–6	State Farm Stadium	Recap
8	October 28	**San Francisco 49ers**	**W** 18–15	2–6	State Farm Stadium	Recap
9	Bye					
10	November 11	at Kansas City Chiefs	**L** 14–26	2–7	Arrowhead Stadium	Recap
11	November 18	Oakland Raiders	**L** 21–23	2–8	State Farm Stadium	Recap
12	November 25	at Los Angeles Chargers	**L** 10–45	2–9	StubHub Center	Recap
13	December 2	at Green Bay Packers	**W** 20–17	3–9	Lambeau Field	Recap
14	December 9	Detroit Lions	**L** 3–17	3–10	State Farm Stadium	Recap
15	December 16	at Atlanta Falcons	**L** 14–40	3–11	Mercedes-Benz Stadium	Recap
16	December 23	**Los Angeles Rams**	**L** 9–31	3–12	State Farm Stadium	Recap
17	December 30	at **Seattle Seahawks**	**L** 24–27	3–13	CenturyLink Field	Recap

Note: Intra-division opponents are in bold text.

=== Game summaries ===
==== Week 1: vs. Washington Redskins ====
Week One: Washington Redskins at Arizona Cardinals – Game summary

Quarter	1	2	3	4	Total
**Redskins**	0	21	0	3	**24**
Cardinals	0	0	0	6	**6**

at State Farm Stadium, Glendale, Arizona

- Date: September 9
- Game time: 1:25 p.m. MST
- Game weather: Played indoors (retractable roof closed)
- Game attendance: 61,613
- Referee: Walt Coleman
- TV announcers (Fox): Thom Brennaman, Chris Spielman and Shannon Spake
- Recap, Gamebook

Game information

**First quarter**

- No scoring plays

**Second quarter**

- WAS – Chris Thompson 13-yard pass from Alex Smith (Dustin Hopkins kick), 15:00. Redskins 7–0. **Drive: 11 plays, 80 yards, 5:53.**
- WAS – Adrian Peterson 1-yard run (Dustin Hopkins kick), 4:12. Redskins 14–0. **Drive: 15 plays, 73 yards, 9:06.**
- WAS – Jordan Reed 4-yard pass from Alex Smith (Dustin Hopkins kick), 0:12. Redskins 21–0. **Drive: 10 plays, 92 yards, 3:11.**

**Third quarter**

- No scoring plays

**Fourth quarter**

- WAS – Dustin Hopkins 31-yard field goal, 12:16. Redskins 24–0. **Drive: 10 plays, 63 yards, 4:42.**
- ARI – David Johnson 2-yard run (pass failed), 5:51. Redskins 24–6. **Drive: 13 plays, 75 yards, 6:26.**

**Top passers**

- WAS – Alex Smith – 21/30, 255 yards, 2 TD
- ARI – Sam Bradford – 20/34, 153 yards, INT

**Top rushers**

- WAS – Adrian Peterson – 26 rushes, 96 yards, TD
- ARI – David Johnson – 9 rushes, 37 yards, TD

**Top receivers**

- WAS – Chris Thompson – 6 receptions, 63 yards, TD
- ARI – Larry Fitzgerald – 7 receptions, 76 yards

==== Week 2: at Los Angeles Rams ====
Week Two: Arizona Cardinals at Los Angeles Rams – Game summary

Quarter	1	2	3	4	Total
Cardinals	0	0	0	0	**0**
**Rams**	0	19	8	7	**34**

at Los Angeles Memorial Coliseum, Los Angeles, California

- Date: September 16
- Game time: 1:05 p.m. MST & PDT
- Game weather: 86 °F (30 °C), sunny
- Game attendance: 66,515
- Referee: Craig Wrolstad
- TV announcers (Fox): Dick Stockton, Mark Schlereth and Jennifer Hale
- Recap, Gamebook

Game information

**First quarter**

- No scoring plays

**Second quarter**

- LAR – Todd Gurley 11-yard run (Todd Gurley run for two-point conversion), 14:29. Rams 8–0. **Drive: 4 plays, 59 yards, 1:19.**
- LAR – Johnny Hekker 20-yard field goal, 8:07. Rams 11–0. **Drive: 11 plays, 52 yards, 4:45.**
- LAR – Todd Gurley 1-yard run (Todd Gurley run for two-point conversion), 0:00. Rams 19–0. **Drive: 8 plays, 32 yards, 4:18.**

**Third quarter**

- LAR – Todd Gurley 2-yard run (Jared Goff pass to Malcolm Brown for two-point conversion), 3:39. Rams 27–0. **Drive: 5 plays, 56 yards, 2:10.**

**Fourth quarter**

- LAR – Tyler Higbee 3-yard pass from Jared Goff (Johnny Hekker kick), 3:17. Rams 34–0. **Drive: 7 plays, 25 yards, 3:45.**

**Top passers**

- ARI – Sam Bradford – 17/27, 90 yards, INT
- LAR – Jared Goff – 24/32, 354 yards, TD, INT

**Top rushers**

- ARI – David Johnson – 13 rushes, 48 yards
- LAR – Malcolm Brown – 12 rushes, 48 yards

**Top receivers**

- ARI – Larry Fitzgerald – 3 receptions, 28 yards
- LAR – Brandin Cooks – 7 receptions, 159 yards

==== Week 3: vs. Chicago Bears ====
Week Three: Chicago Bears at Arizona Cardinals – Game summary

Quarter	1	2	3	4	Total
**Bears**	0	3	10	3	**16**
Cardinals	14	0	0	0	**14**

at State Farm Stadium, Glendale, Arizona

- Date: September 23
- Game time: 1:25 p.m. MST
- Game weather: Played indoors (retractable roof closed)
- Game attendance: 62,163
- Referee: Bill Vinovich
- TV announcers (Fox): Dick Stockton, Mark Schlereth and Jennifer Hale
- Recap, Gamebook

Game information

**First quarter**

- ARI – Ricky Seals-Jones 35-yard pass from Sam Bradford (Phil Dawson kick), 12:12. Cardinals 7–0. **Drive: 5 plays, 75 yards, 2:48.**
- ARI – David Johnson 21-yard pass from Sam Bradford (Phil Dawson kick), 1:40. Cardinals 14–0. **Drive: 1 plays, 21 yards, 0:06.**

**Second quarter**

- CHI – Cody Parkey 20-yard field goal, 1:54. Cardinals 14–3. **Drive: 11 plays, 71 yards, 5:27.**

**Third quarter**

- CHI – Jordan Howard 1-yard run (Cody Parkey kick), 6:16. Cardinals 14–10. **Drive: 9 plays, 67 yards, 4:30.**
- CHI – Cody Parkey 41-yard field goal, 0:44. Cardinals 14–13. **Drive: 7 plays, 21 yards, 2:54.**

**Fourth quarter**

- CHI – Cody Parkey 43-yard field goal, 4:31. Bears 16–14. **Drive: 13 plays, 59 yards, 6:52.**

**Top passers**

- CHI – Mitchell Trubisky – 24/35, 220 yards, 1 INT
- ARI – Sam Bradford – 13/19, 157 yards, 2 TD, 2 INT

**Top rushers**

- CHI – Jordan Howard – 24 carries, 61 yards, 1 TD
- ARI – David Johnson – 12 carries, 31 yards

**Top receivers**

- CHI – Taylor Gabriel – 6 receptions, 34 yards
- ARI – Christian Kirk – 7 receptions, 90 yards

==== Week 4: vs. Seattle Seahawks ====
Week Four: Seattle Seahawks at Arizona Cardinals – Game summary

Quarter	1	2	3	4	Total
**Seahawks**	7	0	10	3	**20**
Cardinals	0	10	0	7	**17**

at State Farm Stadium, Glendale, Arizona

- Date: September 30
- Game time: 1:05 p.m. MST
- Game weather: Played indoors (retractable roof closed)
- Game attendance: 61,845
- Referee: John Hussey
- TV announcers (Fox): Dick Stockton, Mark Schlereth and Jennifer Hale
- Recap, Gamebook

Game information

**First quarter**

- SEA – Mike Davis 20-yard run (Sebastian Janikowski kick), 6:09. Seahawks 7–0. **Drive: 6 plays, 62 yards, 2:57.**

**Second quarter**

- ARI – Phil Dawson 23-yard field goal, 14:04. Seahawks 7–3. **Drive: 13 plays, 68 yards, 5:30.**
- ARI – David Johnson 1-yard run (Phil Dawson kick), 1:52. Cardinals 10–7. **Drive: 6 plays, 58 yards, 3:32.**

**Third quarter**

- SEA – Sebastian Janikowski 40-yard field goal, 4:59. Tied 10–10. **Drive: 14 plays, 57 yards, 7:46.**
- SEA – Mike Davis 1-yard run (Sebastian Janikowski kick), 1:00. Seahawks 17–10. **Drive: 5 plays, 47 yards, 2:19.**

**Fourth quarter**

- ARI – Chad Williams 22-yard pass from Josh Rosen (Phil Dawson kick), 8:59. Tied 17–17. **Drive: 5 plays, 80 yards, 2:39.**
- SEA – Sebastian Janikowski 52-yard field goal, 0:00. Seahawks 20–17. **Drive: 7 plays, 31 yards, 1:50.**

**Top passers**

- SEA – Russell Wilson – 19/26, 172 yards
- ARI – Josh Rosen – 15/27, 180 yards, 1 TD

**Top rushers**

- SEA – Mike Davis – 21 carries, 101 yards, 2 TD
- ARI – David Johnson – 22 carries, 71 yards, 1 TD

**Top receivers**

- SEA – Tyler Lockett – 5 receptions, 53 yards
- ARI – Christian Kirk – 4 receptions, 28 yards

Rosen's first start was a loss as the Seahawks kicked a game-winning field goal. The Cardinals started 0–4 for the first time since 1986 when they were in St. Louis. Coupled with wins by the Raiders and Texans, the Cardinals became the only winless team in the NFL.

==== Week 5: at San Francisco 49ers ====
Week Five: Arizona Cardinals at San Francisco 49ers – Game summary

Quarter	1	2	3	4	Total
**Cardinals**	7	7	0	14	**28**
49ers	6	0	0	12	**18**

at Levi's Stadium, Santa Clara, California

- Date: October 7
- Game time: 1:25 p.m. MST & PDT
- Game weather: 79 °F (26 °C), clear
- Game attendance: 68,337
- Referee: Shawn Smith
- TV announcers (Fox): Dick Stockton, Mark Schlereth and Jennifer Hale
- Recap, Gamebook

Game information

**First quarter**

- SF – Matt Breida 5-yard pass from C. J. Beathard (two-point conversion failed), 9:49. 49ers 6–0. **Drive: 8 plays, 75 yards, 5:11.**
- ARI – Christian Kirk 75-yard pass from Josh Rosen (Phil Dawson kick), 9:39. Cardinals 7–6. **Drive: 1 play, 75 yards, 0:10.**

**Second quarter**

- ARI – David Johnson 2-yard run (Phil Dawson kick), 11:00. Cardinals 14–6. **Drive: 4 plays, 18 yards, 2:18.**

**Third quarter**

- No scoring plays

**Fourth quarter**

- SF – Trent Taylor 1-yard pass from C. J. Beathard (two-point conversion failed), 6:51. Cardinals 14–12. **14 plays, 83 yards, 5:46.**
- ARI – Josh Bynes 23-yard fumble return (Phil Dawson kick), 4:33. Cardinals 21–12.
- ARI – David Johnson 6-yard run (Phil Dawson kick), 3:21. Cardinals 28–12. **Drive: 5 plays, 26 yards, 0:27.**
- SF – C. J. Beathard 1-yard run (two-point conversion failed), 1:29. Cardinals 28–18. **Drive: 10 plays, 76 yards, 1:52.**

**Top passers**

- ARI – Josh Rosen – 10/25, 170 yards, TD
- SF – C. J. Beathard – 34/54, 349 yards, 2 TD, 2 INT

**Top rushers**

- ARI – David Johnson – 18 carries, 55 yards, 2 TD
- SF – Alfred Morris – 18 carries, 61 yards

**Top receivers**

- ARI – Christian Kirk – 3 receptions, 85 yards, TD
- SF – George Kittle – 5 receptions, 83 yards

With the win the Cardinals improve to 1-4 and defeat the 49ers for the 7th consecutive time.

==== Week 6: at Minnesota Vikings ====
Week Six: Arizona Cardinals at Minnesota Vikings – Game summary

Quarter	1	2	3	4	Total
Cardinals	3	7	0	7	**17**
**Vikings**	10	3	14	0	**27**

at U.S. Bank Stadium, Minneapolis, Minnesota

- Date: October 14
- Game time: 12:00 p.m. CDT/10:00 a.m. MST
- Game weather: Played indoors (dome stadium)
- Game attendance: 66,801
- Referee: Jerome Boger
- TV announcers (Fox): Sam Rosen, Ronde Barber and Shane Bacon
- Recap, Gamebook

Game information

**First quarter**

- ARI – Phil Dawson 26-yard field goal, 8:18. Cardinals 3–0. **Drive: 7 plays, 49 yards, 2:47.**
- MIN – Latavius Murray 21-yard run (Dan Bailey kick), 5:33. Vikings 7–3. **Drive: 6 plays, 75 yards, 2:45.**
- MIN – Dan Bailey 37-yard field goal, 2:03. Vikings 10–3. **Drive: 6 plays, 12 yards, 3:23.**

**Second quarter**

- ARI – Budda Baker 36-yard fumble return (Phil Dawson kick), 4:13. Tied 10–10.
- MIN – Dan Bailey 48-yard field goal, 0:07. Vikings 13–10. **Drive: 7 plays, 36 yards, 1:13.**

**Third quarter**

- MIN – Adam Thielen 13-yard pass from Kirk Cousins (Dan Bailey kick), 10:06. Vikings 20–10. **Drive: 10 plays, 75 yards, 4:54.**
- MIN – Kirk Cousins 7-yard run (Dan Bailey kick), 6:37. Vikings 27–10. **Drive: 3 plays, 43 yards, 1:11.**

**Fourth quarter**

- ARI – David Johnson 1-yard run (Phil Dawson kick), 6:57. Vikings 27–17. **Drive: 7 plays, 69 yards, 2:48.**

**Top passers**

- ARI – Josh Rosen – 21/31, 240 yards, INT
- MIN – Kirk Cousins – 24/34, 233 yards, TD, INT

**Top rushers**

- ARI – David Johnson – 18 rushes, 55 yards, TD
- MIN – Latavius Murray – 24 rushes, 155 yards, TD

**Top receivers**

- ARI – Christian Kirk – 6 receptions, 77 yards
- MIN – Adam Thielen – 11 receptions, 123 yards, TD

==== Week 7: vs. Denver Broncos ====
Week Seven: Denver Broncos at Arizona Cardinals – Game summary

Quarter	1	2	3	4	Total
**Broncos**	21	14	7	3	**45**
Cardinals	3	0	7	0	**10**

at State Farm Stadium, Glendale, Arizona

- Date: October 18
- Game time: 5:20 p.m. MST
- Game weather: 78 °F (26 °C), sunny and warm — retractable roof open
- Game attendance: 62,359
- Referee: Alex Kemp
- TV announcers (Fox/NFLN): Joe Buck, Troy Aikman, Erin Andrews and Kristina Pink; Amazon Video: Hannah Storm and Andrea Kremer
- Recap, Gamebook

Game information

**First quarter**

- DEN – Todd Davis 20-yard interception return (Brandon McManus kick), 14:01. Broncos 7–0.
- DEN – Courtland Sutton 28-yard pass from Emmanuel Sanders (Brandon McManus kick), 8:38. Broncos 14–0. **Drive: 6 plays, 77 yards, 3:41.**
- ARI – Phil Dawson 43-yard field goal, 5:18. Broncos 14–3.**Drive: 9 plays, 61 yards, 3:20.**
- DEN – Chris Harris, Jr. 53-yard interception return (Brandon McManus kick), 2:02. Broncos 21–3.

**Second quarter**

- DEN – Emmanuel Sanders 64-yard pass from Case Keenum (Brandon McManus kick), 14:40. Broncos 28–3. **Drive: 1 play, 64 yards, 0:11.**
- DEN – Royce Freeman 1-yard run (Brandon McManus kick), 0:21. Broncos 35–3. **Drive: 15 plays, 70 yards, 6:39.**

**Third quarter**

- ARI – Larry Fitzgerald 4-yard pass from Josh Rosen (Phil Dawson kick), 8:33. Broncos 35–10. **Drive: 11 plays, 63 yards, 4:11.**
- DEN – Phillip Lindsay 28-yard run (Brandon McManus kick), 3:32. Broncos 42–10. **Drive: 3 plays, 43 yards, 1:35.**

**Fourth quarter**

- DEN – Brandon McManus 41-yard field goal, 5:35. Broncos 45–10. **Drive: 4 plays, −11 yards, 2:13.**

**Top passers**

- DEN – Case Keenum – 14/21, 161 yards, TD, INT
- ARI – Josh Rosen – 21/39, 194 yards, TD, 3 INT

**Top rushers**

- DEN – Phillip Lindsay – 14 rushes, 90 yards, TD
- ARI – David Johnson – 14 rushes, 39 yards

**Top receivers**

- DEN – Emmanuel Sanders – 6 receptions, 102 yards, TD
- ARI – Christian Kirk – 3 receptions, 57 yards

==== Week 8: vs. San Francisco 49ers ====
Week Eight: San Francisco 49ers at Arizona Cardinals – Game summary

Quarter	1	2	3	4	Total
49ers	2	3	7	3	**15**
**Cardinals**	0	3	0	15	**18**

at State Farm Stadium, Glendale, Arizona

- Date: October 28
- Game time: 1:25 p.m. MST
- Game weather: Played indoors (retractable roof closed)
- Game attendance: 61,923
- Referee: Brad Allen
- TV announcers (Fox): Dick Stockton, Mark Schlereth and Jennifer Hale
- Recap, Gamebook

Game information

**First quarter**

- SF – Penalty on Josh Rosen enforced in ARI end zone for a safety, 4:17. 49ers 2–0.

**Second quarter**

- ARI – Phil Dawson 31-yard field goal, 10:27. Cardinals 3–2. **Drive: 12 plays, 78 yards, 6:33.**
- SF – Robbie Gould 27-yard field goal, 4:36. 49ers 5–3. **Drive: 4 plays, 3 yards, 1:41.**

**Third quarter**

- SF – Marquise Goodwin 55-yard pass from C. J. Beathard (Robbie Gould kick), 6:32. 49ers 12–3. **Drive: 6 plays, 70 yards, 1:34.**

**Fourth quarter**

- SF – Robbie Gould 20-yard field goal, 13:37. 49ers 15–3. **Drive: 11 plays, 73 yards, 6:14.**
- ARI – Larry Fitzgerald 13-yard pass from Josh Rosen (Phil Dawson kick), 11:11. 49ers 15–10. **Drive: 6 plays, 75 yards, 2:27.**
- ARI – Christian Kirk 9-yard pass from Josh Rosen (Josh Rosen-Larry Fitzgerald pass), 0:39. Cardinals 18–15. **Drive: 12 plays, 73 yards, 1:42.**

**Top passers**

- SF – C. J. Beathard – 14/28, 190 yards, TD
- ARI – Josh Rosen – 23/40, 252 yards, 2 TD, INT

**Top rushers**

- SF – Matt Breida – 16 rushes, 42 yards
- ARI – David Johnson – 16 rushes, 59 yards

**Top receivers**

- SF – Kendrick Bourne – 7 receptions, 71 yards
- ARI – Larry Fitzgerald – 8 receptions, 102 yards, TD

The Cardinals swept the 49ers for the fourth consecutive season.

==== Week 10: at Kansas City Chiefs ====
Week Ten: Arizona Cardinals at Kansas City Chiefs – Game summary

Quarter	1	2	3	4	Total
Cardinals	7	0	7	0	**14**
**Chiefs**	10	10	0	6	**26**

at Arrowhead Stadium, Kansas City, Missouri

- Date: November 11
- Game time: 12:00 p.m. CST/11:00 a.m. MST
- Game weather: 43 °F (6 °C), sunny and clear
- Game attendance: 76,712
- Referee: Carl Cheffers
- TV announcers (CBS): Greg Gumbel, Trent Green, Bruce Arians and Melanie Collins
- Recap, Gamebook

Game information

**First quarter**

- KC – Tyreek Hill 37-yard pass from Patrick Mahomes (Harrison Butker kick), 14:04. Chiefs 7–0. **Drive: 3 plays, 75 yards, 0:56.**
- ARI – David Johnson 9-yard pass from Josh Rosen (Phil Dawson kick), 8:03. Tied 7–7. **Drive: 12 plays, 75 yards, 6:01.**
- KC – Harrison Butker 45-yard field goal, 3:00. Chiefs 10–7. **Drive: 7 plays, 11 yards, 5:03.**

**Second quarter**

- KC – Harrison Butker 46-yard field goal, 12:29. Chiefs 13–7. **Drive: 9 plays, 54 yards, 3:58.**
- KC – Tyreek Hill 14-yard pass from Patrick Mahomes (Harrison Butker kick), 5:31. Chiefs 20–7. **Drive: 9 plays, 73 yards, 4:53.**

**Third quarter**

- ARI – David Johnson 1-yard run (Phil Dawson kick), 7:48. Chiefs 20–14. **Drive: 12 plays, 61 yards, 7:12.**

**Fourth quarter**

- KC – Spencer Ware 3-yard run (pass failed), 10:14. Chiefs 26–14. **Drive: 4 plays, 31 yards, 1:58.**

**Top passers**

- ARI – Josh Rosen – 22/39, 208 yards, 1 TD, 2 INT
- KC – Patrick Mahomes – 21/28, 249 yards, 2 TD

**Top rushers**

- ARI – David Johnson – 21 carries, 98 yards, 1 TD
- KC – Kareem Hunt – 16 carries, 71 yards

**Top receivers**

- ARI – David Johnson – 7 receptions, 85 yards, 1 TD
- KC – Tyreek Hill – 7 receptions, 117 yards, 2 TD

==== Week 11: vs. Oakland Raiders ====
Week Eleven: Oakland Raiders at Arizona Cardinals – Game summary

Quarter	1	2	3	4	Total
**Raiders**	7	7	6	3	**23**
Cardinals	14	0	0	7	**21**

at State Farm Stadium, Glendale, Arizona

- Date: November 18
- Game time: 2:05 p.m. MST
- Game weather: 72 °F (22 °C), sunny — retractable roof open
- Game attendance: 62,435
- Referee: Jerome Boger
- TV announcers (CBS): Spero Dedes and Adam Archuleta
- Recap, Gamebook

Game information

**First quarter**

- OAK – Jared Cook 23-yard pass from Derek Carr (Daniel Carlson kick), 12:36. Raiders 7–0. **Drive: 3 plays, 33 yards, 1:33.**
- ARI – Larry Fitzgerald 18-yard pass from Josh Rosen (Matt McCrane kick), 6:14. Tied 7–7. **Drive: 9 plays, 64 yards, 6:22.**
- ARI – Christian Kirk 59-yard pass from Josh Rosen (Matt McCrane kick), 0:16. Cardinals 14–7. **Drive: 3 plays, 64 yards, 1:40.**

**Second quarter**

- OAK – Brandon LaFell 5-yard pass from Derek Carr (Daniel Carlson kick), 8:20. Tied 14–14. **Drive: 7 plays, 50 yards, 3:37.**

**Third quarter**

- OAK – Daniel Carlson 49-yard field goal, 10:26. Raiders 17–14. **Drive: 7 plays, 44 yards, 4:34.**
- OAK – Daniel Carlson 21-yard field goal, 0:22. Raiders 20–14. **Drive: 12 plays, 63 yards, 7:39.**

**Fourth quarter**

- ARI – Larry Fitzgerald 5-yard pass from Josh Rosen (Matt McCrane kick), 5:02. Cardinals 21–20. **Drive: 6 plays, 80 yards, 2:37.**
- OAK – Daniel Carlson 35-yard field goal, 0:00. Raiders 23–21. **Drive: 9 plays, 63 yards, 1:53.**

**Top passers**

- OAK – Derek Carr – 19/31, 192 yards, 2 TD
- ARI – Josh Rosen – 9/20, 136 yards, 3 TD

**Top rushers**

- OAK – Jalen Richard – 11 carries, 61 yards
- ARI – David Johnson – 25 carries, 137 yards

**Top receivers**

- OAK – Marcell Ateman – 4 receptions, 50 yards
- ARI – Christian Kirk – 3 receptions, 77 yards, TD

==== Week 12: at Los Angeles Chargers ====
Week Twelve: Arizona Cardinals at Los Angeles Chargers – Game summary

Quarter	1	2	3	4	Total
Cardinals	10	0	0	0	**10**
**Chargers**	0	28	14	3	**45**

at StubHub Center, Carson, California

- Date: November 25
- Game time: 2:05 p.m. MST/1:05 p.m. PST
- Game weather: 74 °F (23 °C), partly cloudy
- Game attendance: 25,343
- Referee: Alex Kemp
- TV announcers (Fox): Chris Myers, Daryl Johnston and Laura Okmin
- Recap, Gamebook

Game information

**First quarter**

- ARI – Larry Fitzgerald 25-yard pass from Josh Rosen (Phil Dawson kick), 10:20. Cardinals 7–0. **Drive: 9 plays, 76 yards, 4:40.**
- ARI – Phil Dawson 30-yard field goal, 4:22. Cardinals 10–0. **Drive: 8 plays, 32 yards, 3:47.**

**Second quarter**

- LAC – Mike Williams 9-yard pass from Philip Rivers (Michael Badgley kick), 14:12. Cardinals 10–7. **Drive: 8 plays, 58 yards, 5:10.**
- LAC – Melvin Gordon 28-yard rush (Michael Badgley kick), 6:59. Chargers 14–10. **Drive: 4 plays, 31 yards, 2:35.**
- LAC – Melvin Gordon 5-yard rush (Michael Badgley kick), 4:16. Chargers 21–10. **Drive: 4 plays, 31 yards, 2:35.**
- LAC – Mike Williams 2-yard pass from Philip Rivers (Michael Badgley kick), 0:08. Chargers 28–10. **Drive: 10 plays, 80 yards, 1:37.**

**Third quarter**

- LAC – Keenan Allen 2-yard pass from Philip Rivers (Michael Badgley kick), 8:01. Chargers 35–10. **Drive: 11 plays, 77 yards, 6:59.**
- LAC – Austin Ekeler 2-yard rush (Michael Badgley kick), 0:00. Chargers 42–10. **Drive: 10 plays, 73 yards, 6:04.**

**Fourth quarter**

- LAC – Michael Badgley 31-yard field goal, 3:25. Chargers 45–10. **Drive: 9 plays, 62 yards, 4:58.**

**Top passers**

- ARI – Josh Rosen – 12/19, 105 yards, TD, INT
- LAC – Philip Rivers – 28/29, 259 yards, 3 TD

**Top rushers**

- ARI – David Johnson – 17 carries, 63 yards
- LAC – Melvin Gordon – 10 carries, 61 yards, 2 TD

**Top receivers**

- ARI – Christian Kirk – 4 receptions, 41 yards
- LAC – Keenan Allen – 7 receptions, 72 yards, TD

With the loss, the Cardinals fell to 2-9 and they were swept by the AFC West.

==== Week 13: at Green Bay Packers ====
Week Thirteen: Arizona Cardinals at Green Bay Packers – Game summary

Quarter	1	2	3	4	Total
**Cardinals**	0	7	10	3	**20**
Packers	0	10	0	7	**17**

at Lambeau Field, Green Bay, Wisconsin

- Date: December 2
- Game time: 12:00 p.m. CST/11:00 a.m. MST
- Game weather: 34 °F (1 °C), snow
- Game attendance: 77,234
- Referee: Pete Morelli
- TV announcers (Fox): Chris Myers, Daryl Johnston, and Laura Okmin
- Recap, Gamebook

Game information

First quarter

No scoring plays

Second quarter

- GB – Davante Adams 13-yard pass from Aaron Rodgers (Mason Crosby kick), 11:35. Packers 7–0. **Drive: 5 plays, 35 yards, 2:13.**
- ARI – Chase Edmonds 6-yard run (Zane Gonzalez kick), 4:46. Tied 7–7. **Drive: 11 plays, 70 yards, 6:47.**
- GB – Mason Crosby 32-yard field goal, 0:18. Packers 10–7. **Drive: 14 plays, 46 yards, 4:27.**

Third quarter

- ARI – Zane Gonzalez 32-yard field goal, 5:22. Tied 10–10. **Drive: 6 plays, 61 yards, 2:24.**
- ARI – Chase Edmonds 8-yard run (Zane Gonzalez kick), 2:01. Cardinals 17–10. **Drive: 4 plays, 70 yards, 1:38.**

Fourth quarter

- GB – Aaron Jones 8-yard run (Mason Crosby kick), 5:31. Tied 17–17. **Drive: 11 plays, 95 yards, 5:51.**
- ARI – Zane Gonzalez 44-yard field goal, 1:45. Cardinals 20–17. **Drive: 11 plays, 54 yards, 3:45.**

Top passers

- ARI – Josh Rosen – 11/26, 149 yards
- GB – Aaron Rodgers – 31/50, 233 yards, TD

Top rushers

- ARI – David Johnson – 20 carries, 69 yards
- GB – Aaron Jones – 11 carries, 36 yards, TD

Top receivers

- ARI – Christian Kirk – 3 receptions, 54 yards
- GB – Davante Adams – 8 receptions, 93 yards, TD

In an upset, the Cardinals beat the Packers on the road for the first time since the 1949 season, when the Cardinals were based in Chicago, snapping a nine-game road losing streak against the Packers. It was also the first time they did so at Lambeau Field. As of 2025, this marks the last time the Cardinals defeated the Packers.

==== Week 14: vs. Detroit Lions ====
Week Fourteen: Detroit Lions at Arizona Cardinals – Game summary

Quarter	1	2	3	4	Total
**Lions**	0	3	7	7	**17**
Cardinals	0	0	0	3	**3**

at State Farm Stadium, Glendale, Arizona

- Date: December 9
- Game time: 2:25 p.m. MST
- Game weather: 36 °F (2 °C), cloudy and cold, possible snow flurries — retractable roof open
- Game attendance: 62,014
- Referee: Shawn Hochuli
- TV announcers (Fox): Tim Brando, Brady Quinn and Shane Bacon
- Recap, Gamebook

Game information

**First quarter**

- No scoring

**Second quarter**

- DET – Matt Prater 47-yard field goal, 9:40. **Drive: 3 plays, 55 yards, 7:56.** Lions 3–0.

**Third quarter**

- DET – Darius Slay 67-yard interception return (Matt Prater kick), 3:16. **Drive: 8 plays, 42 yards, 4:42.** Lions 10–0.

**Fourth quarter**

- ARI – Zane Gonzalez 22-yard field goal, 8:21. **Drive: 9 plays, 62 yards, 5:17.** Lions 10–3.
- DET – Zach Zenner 1-yard rush (Matt Prater kick), 4:05. **Drive: 7 plays, 75 yards, 4:09.** Lions 17–3.

**Top passers**

- DET – Matthew Stafford – 15/23, 101 yards
- ARI – Josh Rosen – 26/41, 240 yards, INT

**Top rushers**

- DET – Zach Zenner – 12 carries, 54 yards, TD
- ARI – David Johnson – 15 carries, 49 yards

**Top receivers**

- DET – Theo Riddick – 4 receptions, 30 yards
- ARI – Trent Sherfield – 5 receptions, 77 yards

Larry Fitzgerald passed Jerry Rice for most receptions with a single team in NFL history with 1,282 receptions.

The loss ended the Cardinals' eight-game home winning streak against the Lions, losing to them at home for the first time since the 1993 season.

==== Week 15: at Atlanta Falcons ====
Week Fifteen: Arizona Cardinals at Atlanta Falcons – Game summary

Quarter	1	2	3	4	Total
Cardinals	7	0	0	7	**14**
**Falcons**	10	16	7	7	**40**

at Mercedes-Benz Stadium, Atlanta, Georgia

- Date: December 16
- Game time: 1:00 p.m. EST/11:00 a.m. MST
- Game weather: Played indoors (retractable roof closed)
- Game attendance: 72,084
- Referee: Shawn Smith
- TV announcers (Fox): Kenny Albert, Ronde Barber and Sara Walsh
- Recap, Gamebook

Game information

**First quarter**

- ARI – David Johnson 1-yard rush (Zane Gonzalez kick), 8:25. Cardinals 7–0. **Drive: 8 plays, 64 yards, 3:22.**
- ATL – Deion Jones 41-yard interception return (Matt Bryant kick), 6:11. Tied 7–7.
- ATL – Matt Bryant 22-yard field goal, 0:37. Falcons 10–7. **Drive: 5 plays, 69 yards, 2:15.**

**Second quarter**

- ATL – Matt Ryan 1-yard rush (Matt Bryant kick), 12:32. Falcons 17–7. **Drive: 5 plays, 34 yards, 1:37.**
- ATL – Matt Bryant 33-yard field goal, 5:16. Falcons 20–7. **Drive: 11 plays, 65 yards, 5:03.**
- ATL – Julio Jones 21-yard pass from Matt Ryan (pass failed), 0:13. Falcons 26–7. **Drive: 6 plays, 71 yards, 0:57.**

**Third quarter**

- ATL – Tevin Coleman 43-yard rush (Matt Bryant kick), 5:39. Falcons 33–7. **Drive: 4 plays, 72 yards, 1:53.**

**Fourth quarter**

- ATL – Justin Hardy 5-yard pass from Matt Ryan (Matt Bryant kick), 11:14. Falcons 40–7. **Drive: 12 plays, 76 yards, 6:32.**
- ARI – Trent Sherfield 7-yard pass from Mike Glennon (Zane Gonzalez kick), 3:14. Falcons 40–14. **Drive: 13 plays, 64 yards, 3:50.**

**Top passers**

- ARI – Josh Rosen – 13/22, 132 yards, 2 INT
- ATL – Matt Ryan – 22/36, 231 yards, 2 TD

**Top rushers**

- ARI – David Johnson – 11 carries, 33 yards, 1 TD
- ATL – Tevin Coleman – 11 carries, 145 yards, 1 TD

**Top receivers**

- ARI – Larry Fitzgerald – 7 receptions, 82 yards
- ATL – Julio Jones – 6 receptions, 82 yards, 1 TD

==== Week 16: vs. Los Angeles Rams ====
Week Sixteen: Los Angeles Rams at Arizona Cardinals – Game summary

Quarter	1	2	3	4	Total
**Rams**	7	14	3	7	**31**
Cardinals	3	6	0	0	**9**

at State Farm Stadium, Glendale, Arizona

- Date: December 23
- Game time: 2:05 p.m. MST
- Game weather: 72 °F (22 °C), sunny — retractable roof open
- Game attendance: 61,759
- Referee: Walt Coleman
- TV announcers (Fox): Kevin Burkhardt, Charles Davis and Pam Oliver
- Recap, Gamebook

Game information

**First quarter**

- ARI – Zane Gonzalez 36-yard field goal, 7:07. Cardinals 3–0. **Drive: 8 plays, 23 yards, 4:58.**
- LAR – Robert Woods 4-yard rush (Greg Zuerlein kick), 3:59. Rams 7–3. **Drive: 7 plays, 75 yards, 3:08.**

**Second quarter**

- LAR – Jared Goff 1-yard rush (Greg Zuerlein kick), 11:56. Rams 14–3. **Drive: 11 plays, 84 yards, 5:29.**
- ARI – David Johnson 32-yard pass from Larry Fitzgerald (kick failed kick), 9:40. Rams 14–9. **Drive: 5 plays, 75 yards, 2:16.**
- LAR – C. J. Anderson 4-yard rush (Greg Zuerlein kick), 2:10. Rams 21–9. **Drive: 12 plays, 75 yards, 7:30.**

**Third quarter**

- LAR – Greg Zuerlein 21-yard field goal, 5:37. Rams 24–9. **Drive: 11 plays, 86 yards, 6:15.**

**Fourth quarter**

- LAR – Robert Woods 39-yard pass from Jared Goff (Greg Zuerlein kick), 9:19. Rams 31–9. **Drive: 4 plays, 95 yards, 2:15.**

**Top passers**

- LAR – Jared Goff – 19/24, 216 yards, 1 TD
- ARI – Josh Rosen – 12/23, 87 yards

**Top rushers**

- LAR – C. J. Anderson – 20 carries, 167 yards
- ARI – Josh Rosen – 4 carries, 49 yards

**Top receivers**

- LAR – Robert Woods – 6 receptions, 89 yards, 1 TD
- ARI – Trent Sherfield – 6 receptions, 62 yards

With the loss, the Cardinals fell to 3–12 and finished 1–7 at home, their worst in franchise history

==== Week 17: at Seattle Seahawks ====
Week Seventeen: Arizona Cardinals at Seattle Seahawks – Game summary

Quarter	1	2	3	4	Total
Cardinals	3	10	8	3	**24**
**Seahawks**	7	7	7	6	**27**

at CenturyLink Field, Seattle, Washington

- Date: December 30
- Game time: 2:25 p.m. MST/1:25 p.m. PST
- Game weather: 45 °F (7 °C), cloudy
- Game attendance: 68,990
- Referee: Ronald Torbert
- TV announcers (Fox): Sam Rosen, Brady Quinn and Lisa Byington
- Recap, Gamebook

Game information

**First quarter**

- ARI – Zane Gonzalez 36-yard field goal, 7:22. Cardinals 3–0. **Drive: 7 plays, 11 yards, 2:22.**
- SEA – Tyler Lockett 29-yard pass from Russell Wilson (Sebastian Janikowski kick), 1:25. Seahawks 7–3. **Drive: 6 plays, 47 yards, 2:26.**

**Second quarter**

- SEA – Chris Carson 7-yard rush (Sebastian Janikowski kick), 11:39. Seahawks 14–3. **Drive: 4 plays, 34 yards, 2:12.**
- ARI – Larry Fitzgerald 15-yard pass from Josh Rosen (Zane Gonzalez kick), 5:44. Seahawks 14–10. **Drive: 3 plays, 27 yards, 1:28.**
- ARI – Zane Gonzalez 50-yard field goal, 1:12. Seahawks 14–13. **Drive: 4 plays, 11 yards, 2:13.**

**Third quarter**

- SEA – Mike Davis 17-yard rush (Sebastian Janikowski kick), 4:34. Seahawks 21–13. **Drive: 5 plays, 98 yards, 2:54.**
- ARI – Dennis Gardeck blocked punt recovery in end zone (David Johnson rush), 0:11. Tied 21–21.

**Fourth quarter**

- SEA – Sebastian Janikowski 42-yard field goal, 6:20. Seahawks 24–21. **Drive: 6 plays, 7 yards, 2:38.**
- ARI – Zane Gonzalez 55-yard field goal, 1:49. Tied 24–24. **Drive: 9 plays, 38 yards, 4:31.**
- SEA – Sebastian Janikowski 33-yard field goal, 0:00. Seahawks 27–24. **Drive: 8 plays, 60 yards, 1:49.**

**Top passers**

- ARI – Josh Rosen – 18/34, 149 yards, 1 TD
- SEA – Russell Wilson – 12/21, 152 yards, 1 TD, 1 INT

**Top rushers**

- ARI – David Johnson – 17 carries, 62 yards
- SEA – Chris Carson – 19 carries, 122 yards, 1 TD

**Top receivers**

- ARI – Chad Williams – 5 receptions, 51 yards
- SEA – Tyler Lockett – 2 receptions, 66 yards, 1 TD

With the loss, the Cardinals ended their season at 3–13 and were swept by the Seahawks for the first time since 2014.

=== Standings ===
==== Division ====
NFC West
	W	L	T	PCT	DIV	CONF	PF	PA	STK
^{(2)} Los Angeles Rams	13	3	0	.813	6–0	9–3	527	384	W2
^{(5)} Seattle Seahawks	10	6	0	.625	3–3	8–4	428	347	W2
San Francisco 49ers	4	12	0	.250	1–5	2–10	342	435	L2
Arizona Cardinals	3	13	0	.188	2–4	3–9	225	425	L4

==== Conference ====
NFC
#	Team	Division	W	L	T	PCT	DIV	CONF	SOS	SOV	STK
**Division leaders**
1 (Note: New Orleans finished ahead of LA Rams based on head-to-head victory, claiming the No. 1 seed.)	New Orleans Saints	South	13	3	0	.813	4–2	9–3	.482	.488	L1
2	Los Angeles Rams	West	13	3	0	.813	6–0	9–3	.480	.428	W2
3	Chicago Bears	North	12	4	0	.750	5–1	10–2	.430	.419	W4
4	Dallas Cowboys	East	10	6	0	.625	5–1	9–3	.488	.444	W2
**Wild Cards**
5	Seattle Seahawks	West	10	6	0	.625	3–3	8–4	.484	.400	W2
6	Philadelphia Eagles	East	9	7	0	.563	4–2	6–6	.518	.486	W3
**Did not qualify for the postseason**
7	Minnesota Vikings	North	8	7	1	.531	3–2–1	6–5–1	.504	.355	L1
8 (Note: Atlanta finished ahead of Washington based on head-to-head victory. Atlanta finished ahead of Carolina based on head-to-head sweep. Washington finished ahead of Carolina based on head-to-head victory.)	Atlanta Falcons	South	7	9	0	.438	4–2	7–5	.482	.348	W3
9	Washington Redskins	East	7	9	0	.438	2–4	6–6	.486	.371	L2
10	Carolina Panthers	South	7	9	0	.438	2–4	5–7	.508	.518	W1
11	Green Bay Packers	North	6	9	1	.406	1–4–1	3–8–1	.488	.417	L1
12	Detroit Lions	North	6	10	0	.375	2–4	4–8	.504	.427	W1
13 (Note: NY Giants finished ahead of Tampa Bay based on head-to-head victory.)	New York Giants	East	5	11	0	.313	1–5	4–8	.527	.487	L3
14	Tampa Bay Buccaneers	South	5	11	0	.313	2–4	4–8	.523	.506	L4
15	San Francisco 49ers	West	4	12	0	.250	1–5	2–10	.504	.406	L2
16	Arizona Cardinals	West	3	13	0	.188	2–4	3–9	.527	.302	L4
**Tiebreakers** (Note: When breaking ties for three or more teams under the NFL's rules, they are first broken within divisions, then comparing only the highest-ranked remaining team from each division.)

== Statistics ==
=== Starters ===
Offense

Pos.	Name	GS
QB	Sam Bradford; Josh Rosen	3; 13
RB	David Johnson	16
WR1	Larry Fitzgerald	16
WR2	Chad Williams; J.J. Nelson	10; 6
WR3	Christian Kirk	12
TE	Jermaine Gresham	11
LT	D.J. Humphries	9
LG	Mike Iupati	10
C	Mason Cole	16
RG	Justin Pugh	7
RT	Andre Smith	8

Defense

Pos.	Name	GS
DE	Markus Golden; Benson Mayowa; Zach Moore	11; 4; 1
DT	Corey Peters; Robert Nkemdiche	15; 1
DT	Rodney Gunter	16
DE	Chandler Jones	16
LB	Haason Reddick	16
LB	Josh Bynes; Gerald Hodges; Vontarrius Dora	11; 4; 1
LB	Deone Bucannon; Gerald Hodges	13; 3
CB	Patrick Peterson	16
SS	Budda Baker; Tre Boston	14; 2
FS	Antoine Bethea	16
CB	Jamar Taylor; Bene Benwikere; David Amerson	3; 8; 5

Special Teams

Pos.	Name	GS
P	Andy Lee	16
K	Phil Dawson; Zane Gonzalez; Matthew McCrane	10; 5; 1
LS	Aaron Brewer	16

=== Individual leaders ===
Category	Player(s)	Value
Passing yards	Josh Rosen	2,278
Passing touchdowns	Josh Rosen	11
Rushing yards	David Johnson	940
Rushing touchdowns	David Johnson	7
Receptions	Larry Fitzgerald	69
Receiving yards	Larry Fitzgerald	734
Receiving touchdowns	Larry Fitzgerald	6
Kickoff return yards	T.J. Logan	296
Punt return yards	Christian Kirk	164
Tackles	Antoine Bethea	121
Sacks	Chandler Jones	13.0
Forced fumbles	Chandler Jones	3
Interceptions	Tre Boston	3
Kicking - field goals	Zane Gonzalez	7/9, 77.8%
Kicking - extra points	Phil Dawson	15/15, 100%

=== Team rankings ===
Category	Value	NFL rank (out of 32)
Passing attempts	495	
Passing completions	283	29th
Passing yards	2,523	32nd
Passing touchdowns	15	30th
Interceptions thrown	18	28th
Rushing attempts	355	28th
Rushing yards	1,342	32nd
Rushing touchdowns	9	27th
Rushing yards/attempt	3.8	32nd
Total yards of offense	3,865	32nd
Points scored	225	32nd
Points allowed	425	26th
Passing yards allowed	3,262	4th
Passing touchdowns allowed	21	3rd
Rushing attempts against	510	32nd
Rushing yards allowed	2,479	32nd
Rushing touchdowns allowed	25	32nd
Yards/rush attempt allowed	4.9	27th
Interceptions made	7	29th
Fumbles recovered	9	14th
Total yards allowed	5,741	20th

Statistics correct as of the end of the 2018 NFL season
