= Saguaro High School =

Secondary school in Scottsdale, Arizona

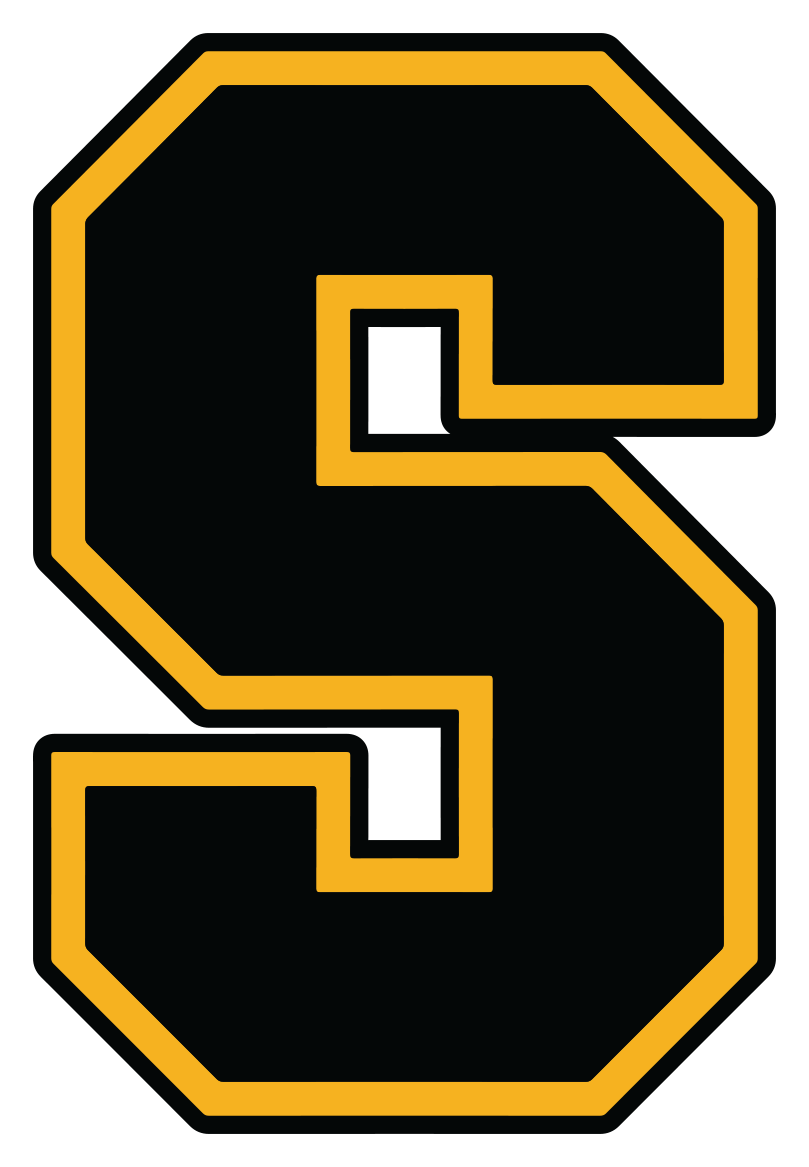

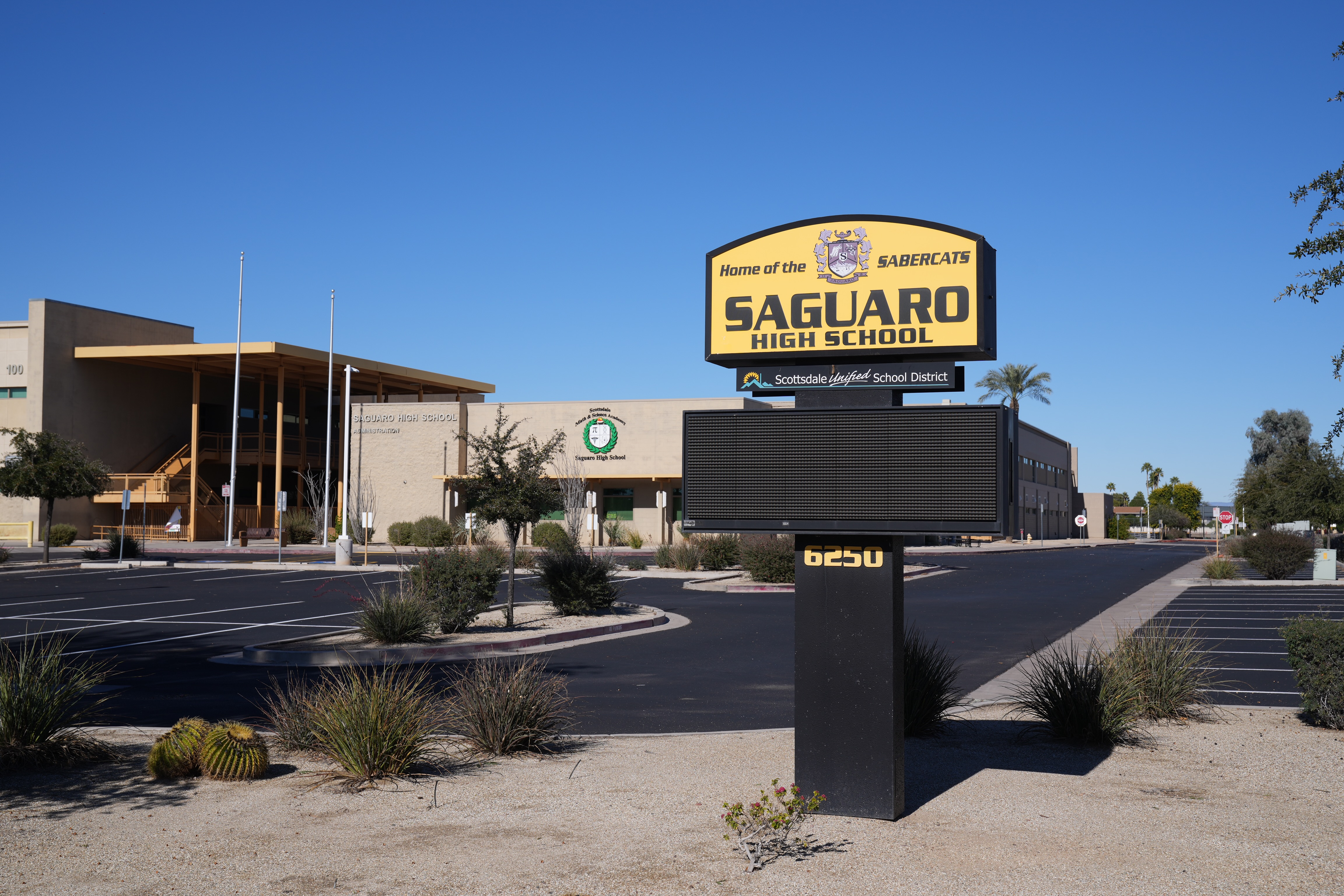
- Saguaro High School

Location
- 6250 North 82nd Street; Scottsdale, Arizona 85250; United States; 33°31′38″N 111°54′22″W

Information
- Type: Secondary public school
- Established: 1966
- School district: Scottsdale Unified School District
- Principal: Micheal Georgia
- Teaching staff: 70.20 (FTE)
- Enrollment: 1,300 (2024-2025)
- Student to teacher ratio: 18.52
- Colors: Black and gold
- Mascot: Sabercat
- Newspaper: The Saguaro Sabercat
- Yearbook: The Saguaro Sentinel
- Website: saguaro.susd.org

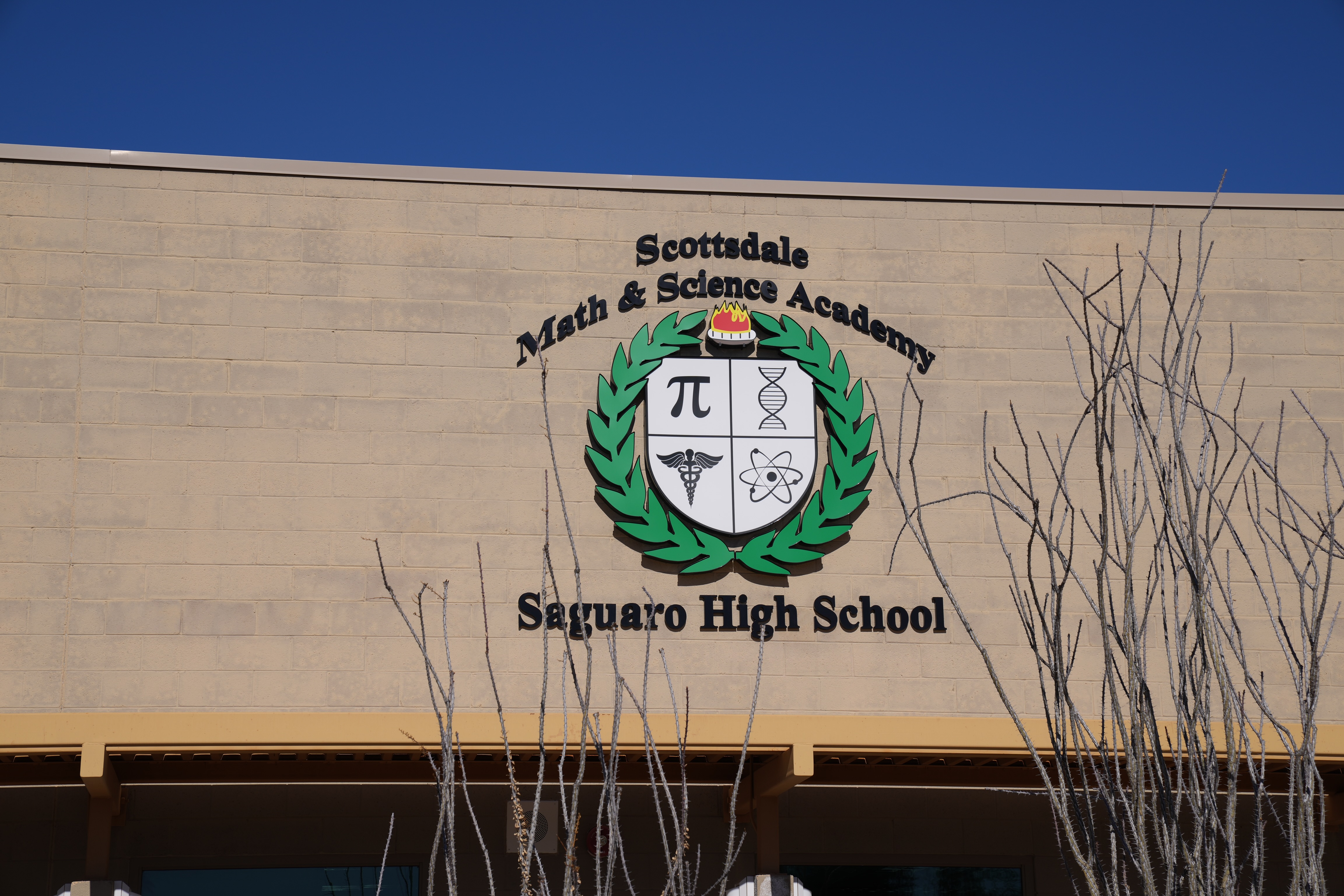
Scottsdale Math & Science Academy, Saguaro High School

Saguaro High School is a former Arizona A+ and Blue Ribbon Schools Program certified high school in the Scottsdale Unified School District in Scottsdale, Arizona, United States. Saguaro was opened in 1966.

== Sports ==
Saguaro's varsity football program has won an Arizona state championship fourteen times (1995, 2006, 2007, 2008, 2010, 2011, 2013, 2014, 2015, 2016, 2017, 2018, 2021, and 2023).

The varsity baseball program is four time state champions (1992, 2010, 2011 and 2024).

The varsity boys' basketball program has won three state championships (1990, 1996, and 2004). The varsity girls' basketball program won one state title, in 2013.

The SHS varsity golf programs have combined for four state titles (boys' golf in 1977 and 1990; girls' golf in 1997 and 1998).

The girls' swim and dive team won one state title, in 1971.

Saguaro Track and Field has had several athletes win state: in the 4x440yrd relay in 1978, in the 300m hurdles in 1995, in the 3200m run in 2016 and 2017, and the 100m, 200m and 4x100m relay in 2018 and 2019 respectively.

The men's tennis teams through 2009-2013 reached the state playoffs four years in a row led by the 2013 senior class.

The Saguaro senior class of 1996 won the school's first ever football state championship, and also won the basketball state championship. The baseball team lost in the state championship final, finishing 2nd in the state.

== Performing arts ==
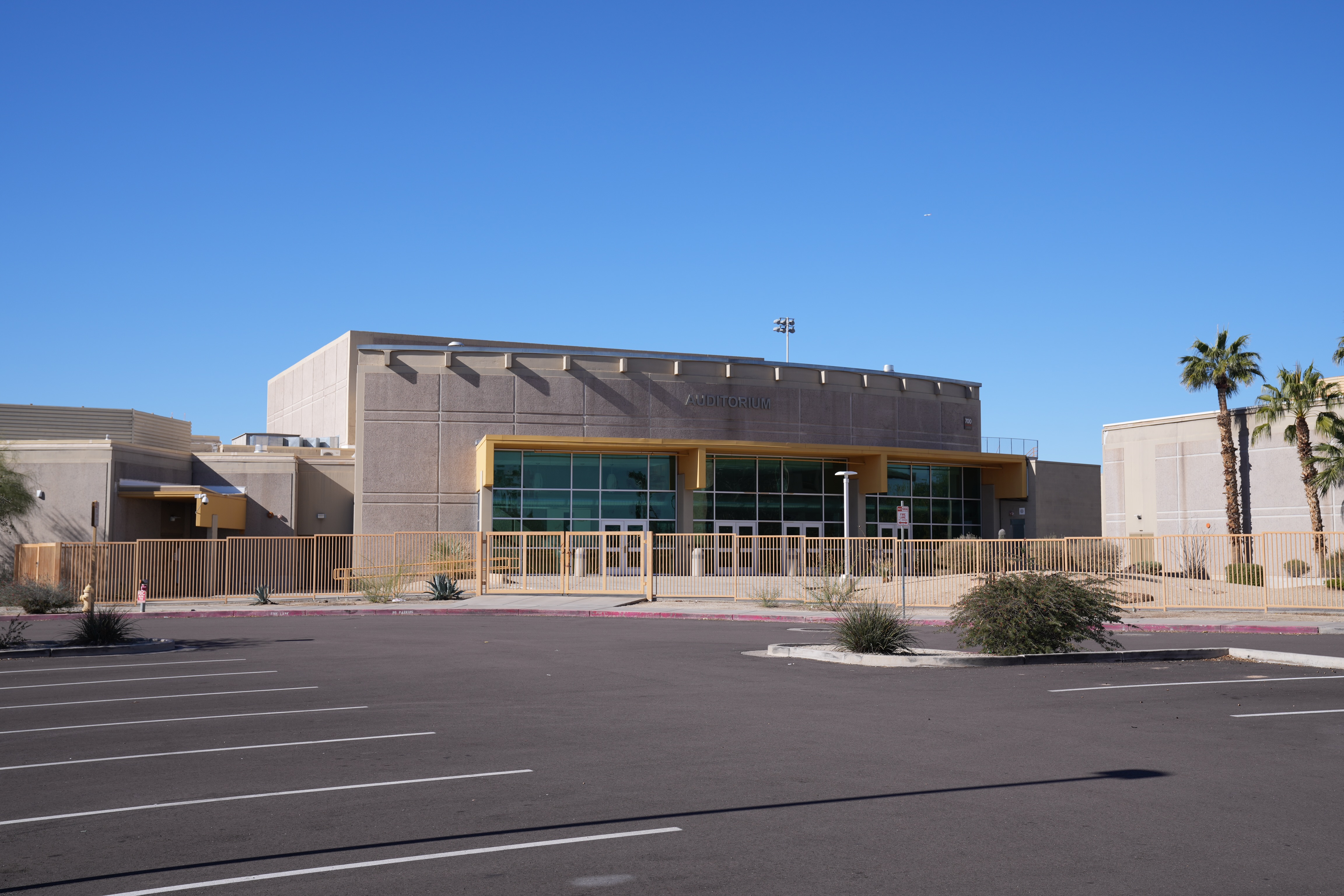
Saguaro High School auditorium

Saguaro High School has five disciplines in its performing arts department: orchestra, band, dance, theater, and choir.

== Notable alumni ==
=== Professional athletes ===
- T.J. Beam, former MLB player (New York Yankees, Pittsburgh Pirates)
- Jeremy Brigham, NFL player (Oakland Raiders)
- Mike Brown, All-Pro defensive back, Chicago Bears
- Denzel Burke, NFL player (Arizona Cardinals)
- Cam Caminiti, baseball player drafted in the 2024 MLB draft
- Devon Dampier, American football quarterback
- D. J. Foster, NFL player (Arizona Cardinals)
- Hayden Hatten, NFL player (Seattle Seahawks)
- Hogan Hatten, NFL player (Detroit Lions)
- Dale Hellestrae, football player; offensive lineman for the Buffalo Bills, Dallas Cowboys, and Baltimore Ravens; played for three Dallas Cowboys Super Bowl teams
- Jason Kershner, former MLB player (Toronto Blue Jays, San Diego Padres)
- Christian Kirk, NFL player (Houston Texans)
- Byron Murphy, NFL player (Minnesota Vikings)
- Jay Pettibone, former MLB player (Minnesota Twins)
- Kelee Ringo, NFL player (Philadelphia Eagles)

=== Entertainment and media ===
- Matt Barrie, ESPN SportsCenter anchor
- Sandra Bernhard, actress and comedian, class of ‘73
- Scott Johnson, musician in the Gin Blossoms, class of '81
- Chelsea Kane, actress (attended for one year, then moved to California)
- J. S. Lewis, fiction writer
- Rick Lord, news anchor, WCHS-TV Charleston WV
- John Joseph "J.R." Moehringer, novelist and journalist, class of '82
- Neal Pollack, novelist and humor writer
- Richard Sala, artist, cartoonist, author
- David Spade, actor, comedian and producer, class of '82

=== Government ===
- Analise Ortiz, Arizona State Senator representing the 24th District
- Bruce Rauner, former Governor of Illinois
- David Schweikert, U.S. Representative from Arizona's 6th Congressional district
