= Manifest: The Chryzinium Era =

- Film poster
- Directed by: Rick Lord; Tim Wade; Phillip Wade
- Written by: Rick Lord
- Produced by: Rick Lord; Tim Wade; Phillip Wade
- Starring: Phoebe Jacobs; Rick Lord; Tim Wade
- Edited by: Timotheus Hucklestone
- Music by: Alex Khaskin; Yuri Sazonoff
- Production companies: Ambition Pictures; Matchlight Films
- Release date: September 28, 2017
- Running time: 25 minutes
- Country: United States
- Language: English

Manifest: The Chryzinium Era is a 2017 American science fiction short film drama, written, directed and produced by Rick Lord, Phillip Wade and Tim Wade, in which Madison and her father are outcasts in a society ruled by an alien civilization. Survival is becoming more difficult, forcing Madison to make a decision that will change her life forever. The film stars Phoebe Jacobs, Rick Lord and Tim Wade.

== Plot ==
The film opens in the park with a family having a picnic. The father is John, a respected doctor. He has a wife and two children, Cory and Madison. Madison hasn't been born yet. In the coming years John's wife dies of cancer and a grief-stricken John turns to alcohol. Over time the family loses everything. Narration from Madison states "I thought life couldn't get any harder. But then one night everything changed." The camera pulls away from the small house in the country to reveal a massive spaceship overhead.

One year later Madison is in a country store trying to buy food. Her brother Cory works there but can't let her buy anything. Narration reveals that the aliens have taken over the government and that those who refuse to join them have their rights taken away, including buying or selling. After leaving the store, Cory runs after her with a bag of groceries. He apologises to Madison and says hello to his father. They drive home.

John has flashbacks back to park with his family.

The next morning John leaves the house to trade supplies for water. After he returns they are visited by an alien who encourages Madison to leave her father and join them. In addition to freedom, the drug he offers her will extend her life by one-hundred years. After a discussion with her father, Madison decides to join.

== Cast ==
- Rick Lord as John
- Phoebe Jacobs as Madison
- Tim Wade as Cory
- Phillip Wade as Eli
- Edward Stiner as Luke
- Tracy Wachter Webber as John's Wife
- Danny O'Donnell as Younger Cory
- Hunter Rose Teal as Girl in Store

== Production ==
Shooting began on April 22, 2014. The film's opening scenes were shot in Macleay, Oregon at the Macleay Village Store. The film was primarily shot in Salem, Oregon in a warehouse where the interior house set was built. The exterior house set was built in Stayton, Oregon

== Release ==
The film originally premiered in 2014 under the title "Chryzinium" at the Grand Theater in Salem, Oregon on September 23, 2014, followed by becoming an official selection at the 48th WorldFest-Houston International Film Festival and the 2015 Beverly Hills Film Festival. In 2017 the film was rebooted, given a new title "Manifest: The Chryzinium Era" and had its world premiere at the Salem Cinema in Salem, Oregon on September 26, 2017,

== Accolades ==
Festival	Category	Award	Result
WorldFest-Houston	Live Action - Narrative	Grand Remi	Nominated
WorldFest-Houston	Live Action - Narrative	Special Jury Award	Won

== Feature Film ==
It was announced January 2015 that a feature film by the same title was being adapted from the short film. The film is currently in development.
