= Christian Kirk =

American football player (born 1996)

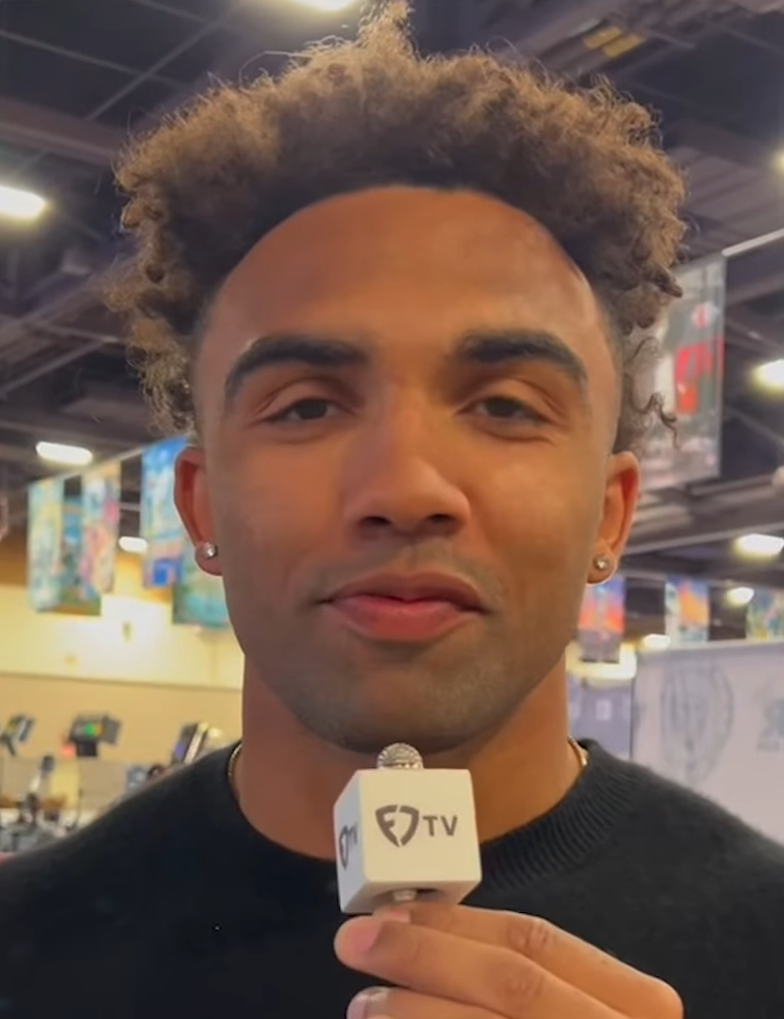
- Kirk in 2023

San Francisco 49ers
- Position: Wide receiver
- Roster status: Injured reserve

Personal information
- Born: November 18, 1996 (age 29); Scottsdale, Arizona, U.S.
- Listed height: 5 ft 11 in (1.80 m)
- Listed weight: 200 lb (91 kg)

Career information
- High school: Saguaro (Scottsdale)
- College: Texas A&M (2015–2017)
- NFL draft: 2018: 2nd round, 47th overall pick

Career history
- Arizona Cardinals (2018–2021); Jacksonville Jaguars (2022–2024); Houston Texans (2025); San Francisco 49ers (2026–present)

Awards and highlights
- PFWA All-Rookie Team (2018); 2× NCAA average punt return yards leader (2015, 2016); 2× First-team All-SEC (2016, 2017); Second-team All-SEC (2015); SEC Freshman of the Year (2015)

Career NFL statistics as of 2025
- Receptions: 432
- Receiving yards: 5,415
- Receiving touchdowns: 30
- Stats at Pro Football Reference

Christian Davon Kirk (born November 18, 1996) is an American professional football wide receiver for the San Francisco 49ers of the National Football League (NFL). He played college football for the Texas A&M Aggies and was selected by the Arizona Cardinals in the second round of the 2018 NFL draft. Kirk has also played for the Jacksonville Jaguars and Houston Texans.

== Early life ==
Kirk attended Saguaro High School in Scottsdale, Arizona, where he played high school football. He played both wide receiver and running back for the Sabercats. He gained over 3,000 all-purpose yards as a senior and 2,000 as a junior. Kirk was rated by Rivals.com as a five-star recruit and was ranked among the top overall prospects in his class. He committed to Texas A&M University to play college football.

College recruiting
Name	Hometown	School	Height	Weight	40^{‡}	Commit date
Christian Kirk; WR	Scottsdale, Arizona	Saguaro HS	5 ft 11 in (1.80 m)	192 lb (87 kg)	4.48	Dec 17, 2014
Christian Kirk; WR	Recruit ratings: Scout: Rivals: 247Sports: ESPN:					
Overall recruit ranking: Scout: 1 (WR) Rivals: 3 (WR) ESPN: 4 (WR)
Note: In many cases, Scout, Rivals, 247Sports, On3, and ESPN may conflict in their listings of height and weight.; In these cases, the average was taken. ESPN grades are on a 100-point scale.; Sources: "Texas A&M Football Commitments". Rivals.; "2015 Texas A & M College Football Recruiting Commits". Scout.; "ESPN". ESPN.; "Scout.com Team Recruiting Rankings". Scout.; "2015 Team Ranking". Rivals.com.

== College career ==
Kirk attended and played college football at Texas A&M under head coach Kevin Sumlin. Kirk earned a starting job at receiver as a true freshman in 2015. In his first game, he had 6 receptions for 106 yards with a touchdown and also returned a punt 79 yards for a touchdown. As a freshman in 2015, Kirk played 13 games with 1,009 receiving yards and seven touchdowns. He also had two return touchdowns on 14 punt returns for 341 yards and 20 kickoff returns for 385 yards. His 24.4-yard punt return average led the NCAA in 2015. As a sophomore in 2016, Kirk played 13 games with 928 receiving yards and nine touchdowns. He also had three return touchdowns on 13 punt returns for 282 yards and 6 kickoff returns for 173 yards. His 21.7-yard punt return average again led the NCAA. In 2017, as a junior, he played in 13 games, catching 71 passes for 919 yards and 10 touchdowns, along with one touchdown on 10 punt returns for 191 yards and one touchdown on 22 returns for 490 yards. After the season, Kirk declared for the 2018 NFL draft.

=== College statistics ===
Legend
	Led the NCAA
**Bold**	Career high

Season	Team	Conf	Class	Pos	GP	Receiving				Kick returns				Punt returns			
Season	Team	Conf	Class	Pos	GP	Rec	Yds	Avg	TD	Ret	Yds	Avg	TD	Ret	Yds	Avg	TD
2015	Texas A&M	SEC	FR	WR	13	80	**1,009**	12.6	7	20	385	19.3	0	**14**	**341**	**24.4**	2
2016	Texas A&M	SEC	SO	WR	13	**83**	928	11.2	9	6	173	**28.8**	0	13	282	21.7	**3**
2017	Texas A&M	SEC	JR	WR	13	71	919	**12.9**	**10**	**22**	**490**	22.3	**1**	10	191	19.1	1
Career					39	234	2,856	12.2	26	48	1,048	21.8	1	37	814	22.0	6

== Professional career ==
Pre-draft measurables
Height	Weight	Arm length	Hand span	Wingspan	40-yard dash	10-yard split	20-yard split	20-yard shuttle	Three-cone drill	Vertical jump	Broad jump	Bench press
5 ft 10 3/8 in (1.79 m)	201 lb (91 kg)	30 3/8 in (0.77 m)	9 7/8 in (0.25 m)	6 ft 0 7/8 in (1.85 m)	4.47 s	1.50 s	2.59 s	4.45 s	7.09 s	35.5 in (0.90 m)	9 ft 7 in (2.92 m)	20 reps
All values from NFL Combine

=== Arizona Cardinals ===
Kirk was drafted by the Arizona Cardinals in the second round (47th overall) of the 2018 NFL draft. He was the fifth wide receiver to be selected that year. In the Cardinals' season-opening loss to the Washington Redskins, Kirk had a four-yard reception to go along with two punt returns for 44 net yards in his NFL debut. In Week 3, he recorded a solid game with seven receptions for 90 yards in the 16–14 loss to the Chicago Bears. In Week 5 against the San Francisco 49ers, he caught a 75-yard touchdown bomb from fellow rookie Josh Rosen to help the Cardinals earn their first win of the season by a score of 28–18. He played in 12 games, starting seven, recording 43 receptions for 590 yards and three touchdowns. He suffered a broken foot in Week 13 and was placed on injured reserve on December 3, 2018. He was named to the PFWA All-Rookie Team.

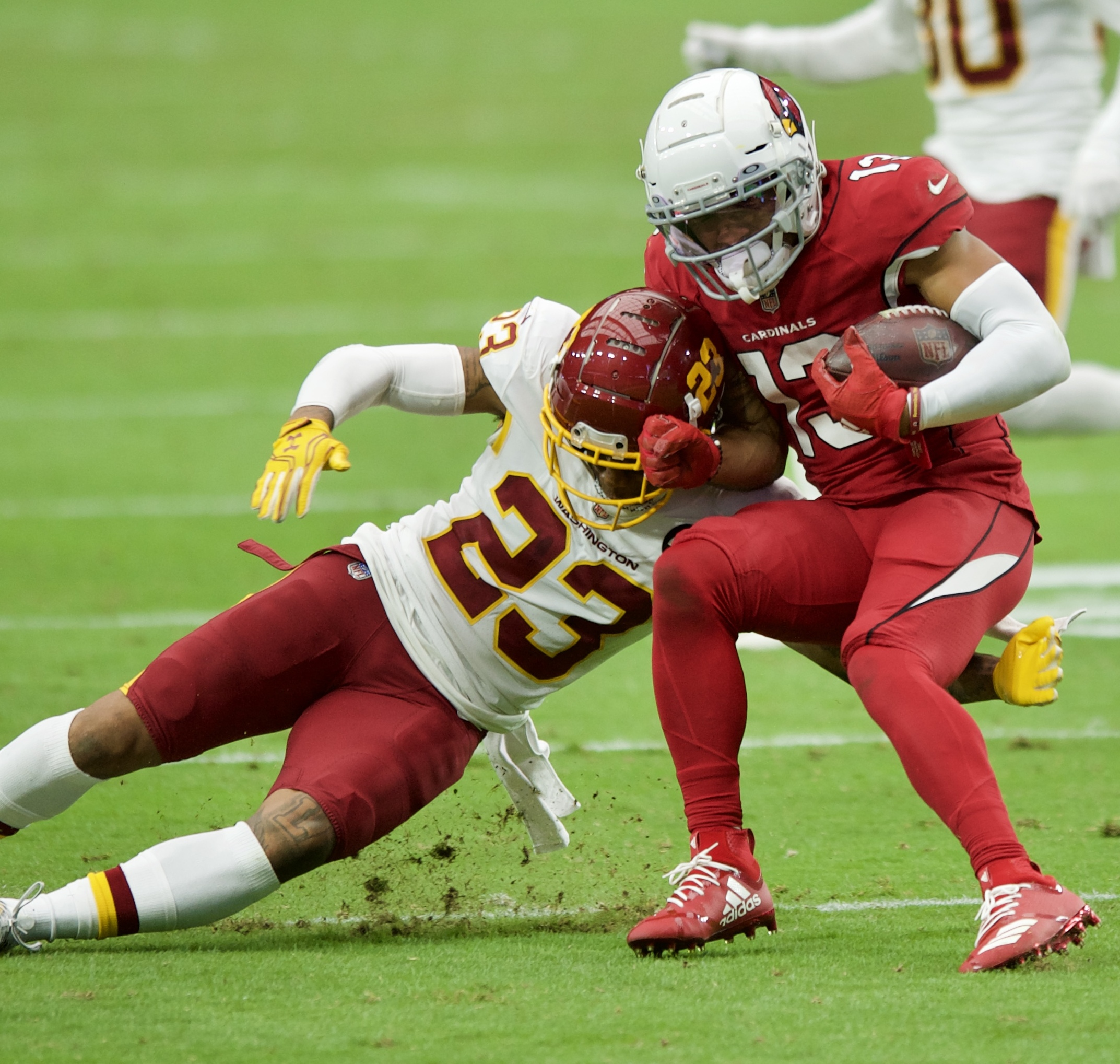
Kirk playing against the Washington Football Team in 2020.

In Week 2 against the Baltimore Ravens in 2019, Kirk caught six passes for 114 yards as the Cardinals lost 23–17. In Week 10 against the Tampa Bay Buccaneers, Kirk caught 6 passes for 138 yards and three touchdowns in the 30–27 loss. Overall, Kirk finished the 2019 season with 68 receptions for 709 receiving yards and three receiving touchdowns.

In Week 6 against the Dallas Cowboys in 2020, Kirk had two receptions for 86 receiving yards and two receiving touchdowns in the 38–10 victory. In the following game, a 37–34 overtime victory over the Seattle Seahawks, he again recorded two receiving touchdowns. In a Week 9 loss to the Miami Dolphins, he had five receptions for 123 receiving yards and one receiving touchdown. He was placed on the reserve/COVID-19 list by the Cardinals on January 2, 2021, and activated on January 13.

Overall, in the 2020 season, Kirk finished with 48 receptions for 621 receiving yards and six receiving touchdowns in 14 games.

Kirk entered the 2021 season third on the Cardinals wide receiver depth chart. He finished the season as the Cardinals leading receiver with a career-high 77 catches for 982 yards and five touchdowns.

=== Jacksonville Jaguars ===
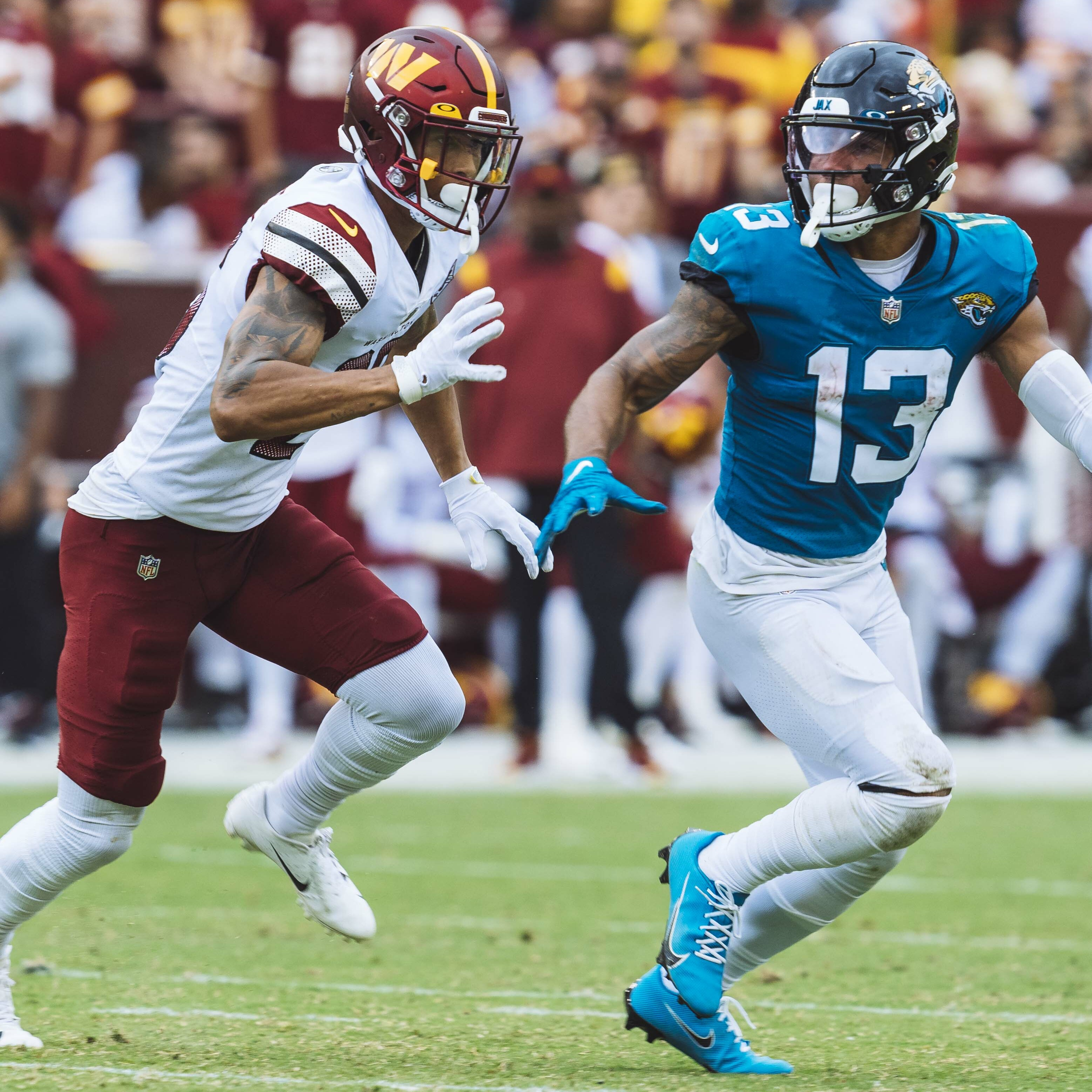
Kirk playing for the Jacksonville Jaguars in 2022.

On March 16, 2022, Kirk signed a four-year, $72 million contract with the Jacksonville Jaguars. In his Jaguars debut, Kirk had six receptions for 117 yards in the 28–22 loss to the Washington Commanders. In the following game, he recorded two receiving touchdowns in the 24–0 victory over the Indianapolis Colts. In Week 10, against the Kansas City Chiefs, he had nine receptions for 105 yards and two touchdowns in the 27–17 loss. In the 2022 season, Kirk achieved career-highs with 84 receptions, 1,108 receiving yards and eight touchdown receptions. Kirk scored receiving touchdowns in both of the Jaguars' postseason games.

In the 2023 season, Kirk had 57 receptions for 787 yards and three touchdowns in 12 games. Kirk missed the last five games of the 2023 season with a core muscle injury.

In the 2024 season, Kirk had 27 receptions for 379 yards and one touchdown in eight games. On November 2, after suffering a season-ending broken collarbone in a Week 8 matchup against the Green Bay Packers, Kirk was placed on injured reserve.

=== Houston Texans ===
On March 12, 2025, Kirk was traded to the Houston Texans in exchange for a seventh-round pick in the 2026 NFL draft. Kirk had 28 receptions for 239 yards and one touchdown in 13 games in the 2025 season. He had eight receptions for 144 yards in the team's Wild Card Round win over the Pittsburgh Steelers. Kirk had a receiving touchdown in Houston's 28–16 loss to the New England Patriots in the Divisional Round.

=== San Francisco 49ers ===
On March 18, 2026, Kirk signed a one-year, $6 million contract with the San Francisco 49ers. He was placed on injured reserve on August 30 due to a severe left calf strain suffered in training camp. On October 24, Kirk was activated off injured reserve. On November 7, Kirk was placed on injured reserve.

== NFL career statistics ==
Legend
	Led the league
**Bold**	Career high

=== Regular season ===
Year	Team	Games		Receiving					Rushing					Fumbles	
Year	Team	GP	GS	Rec	Yds	Avg	Lng	TD	Att	Yds	Avg	Lng	TD	Fum	Lost
2018	ARI	12	7	43	590	13.7	75	3	3	35	**11.7**	23	0	0	0
2019	ARI	13	13	68	709	10.4	69	3	**10**	**93**	9.3	**28**	0	0	0
2020	ARI	14	10	48	621	12.9	**80**	6	2	3	1.5	3	0	1	0
2021	ARI	17	11	77	982	12.8	50	5	1	11	11.0	11	0	0	0
2022	JAX	17	17	**84**	**1,108**	13.2	49	**8**	5	11	2.2	5	0	1	1
2023	JAX	12	7	57	787	13.8	45	3	1	6	6.0	6	0	**2**	**2**
2024	JAX	8	7	27	379	**14.0**	61	1	0	0	0.0	0	0	0	0
2025	HOU	13	3	28	279	8.5	47	1	0	0	0.0	0	0	0	0
Career		106	80	432	5,415	12.5	80	30	22	159	7.2	28	0	4	3

=== Postseason ===
Year	Team	Games		Receiving					Rushing					Fumbles	
Year	Team	GP	GS	Rec	Yds	Avg	Lng	TD	Att	Yds	Avg	Lng	TD	Fum	Lost
2021	ARI	1	0	6	51	8.5	23	0	—	—	—	—	—	**1**	0
2022	JAX	2	2	**15**	130	8.7	17	**2**	**1**	**18**	**18.0**	**18**	0	0	0
2025	HOU	2	0	10	**164**	**16.4**	**46**	**2**	—	—	—	—	—	0	0
Career		5	2	31	345	11.1	46	4	1	18	18.0	18	0	1	0

== Personal life ==
On May 14, 2018, it was revealed that Kirk was arrested for disorderly conduct and causing property damage in Scottsdale, Arizona, which occurred on February 3, more than two months prior to the draft. Kirk allegedly threw rocks at cars while attending the Waste Management Phoenix Open at TPC Scottsdale. Kirk was deemed to be intoxicated during the incident. On May 29, 2018, all charges against Kirk were dropped.
