= Alex Khaskin =

Russian composer

Alex Khaskin (born 1960) is a Russian-Canadian composer living and working in Toronto, Ontario, Canada.

== Early life and education ==
He was born in St. Petersburg. He spent his early years studying music, classical orchestration, and arrangement.

== Career ==
Khaskin immigrated to Canada in 1993 and later began working as a film composer while residing in Toronto. IN 2015 he wrote the score for the film A Christmas Horror Story by creating spooky adaptations of traditional Christmas carols.

== Filmography ==
- Fulltime Killer (2001)
- Ginger Snaps Back (2004)
- Chryzinium (2014)
- A Christmas Horror Story (2015)
- A change of Heart (Nature of Things - David Suzuki)
- Evil Breed: The Legend of Samhain
- Nostradamus (2000)
- My Opposition: the Diaries of Friedrich Kellner (2007)
- Ghost Trackers (YTV Canada) CCI Entertainment
- Erky Perky (CCI and Ambience Entertainment.)
- The Fifth Estate (CBC)
- Driving Dreams (Barna Alper)
- Haunter.
