= Hogan Hatten =

American football player (born 2000)

No. 49 – Detroit Lions
- Position: Long snapper
- Roster status: Active

Personal information
- Born: August 6, 2000 (age 26); Scottsdale, Arizona, U.S.
- Listed height: 6 ft 2 in (1.88 m)
- Listed weight: 239 lb (108 kg)

Career information
- High school: Saguaro (Scottsdale, Arizona)
- College: Idaho (2019–2023)
- NFL draft: 2024: undrafted

Career history
- Detroit Lions (2024–present)

Career NFL statistics as of Week 8, 2026
- Games played: 41
- Total tackles: 7
- Stats at Pro Football Reference

Hogan Hatten (born August 6, 2000) is an American professional football long snapper for the Detroit Lions of the National Football League (NFL). He played college football for the Idaho Vandals.

== Early life ==
Hatten attended Saguaro High School located in Scottsdale, Arizona. Coming out of high school, Hatten and his twin Hayden initially committed to play college football for the Brown Bears, but they would eventually flip their commitment to play for the Idaho Vandals.

== College career ==
During Hatten's five-year collegiate career, he played as both a linebacker and a long snapper for the Vandals, where he played in 49 games where he notched 92 tackles with six and a half being for a loss, three sacks, a pass deflection, and a safety, while also recording all perfect snaps throughout his career.

== Professional career ==
Pre-draft measurables
Height	Weight	Arm length	Hand span	Wingspan	40-yard dash	10-yard split	20-yard split	20-yard shuttle	Three-cone drill	Vertical jump	Bench press
6 ft 1 3/8 in (1.86 m)	238 lb (108 kg)	31 1/2 in (0.80 m)	9 in (0.23 m)	6 ft 3 in (1.91 m)	4.83 s	1.67 s	2.81 s	4.50 s	7.15 s	36.0 in (0.91 m)	18 reps
All values from Pro Day

After not being selected in the 2024 NFL draft, Hatten signed with the Detroit Lions as an undrafted free agent. On August 26, Hatten was informed that he won the starting job over incumbent long snapper Scott Daly, being one of 3 UDFAs to make the Lions' initial 53 man roster. Hatten is 1 of 4 former Idaho Vandals that are actively playing in the NFL as of the 2024 Season. In the 2024 NFL regular season, Hatten was tied for the most tackles made by Long Snappers at five.

== Personal life ==
Hatten is of Mexican descent through his mother. His identical twin, Hayden, played with him at Idaho.
