= Chad Williams (wide receiver) =

American football player (born 1994)

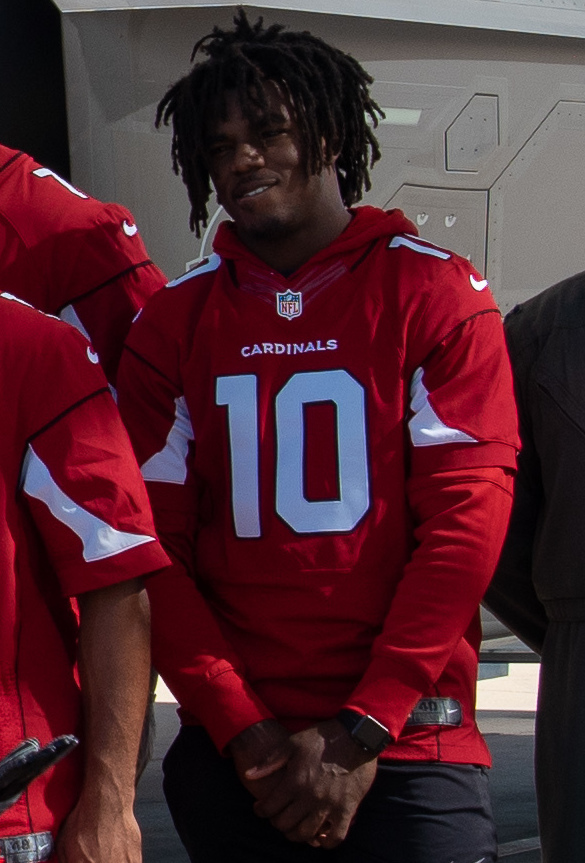
- Williams at Luke Air Force Base in 2018

No. 16, 10, 11
- Position: Wide receiver

Personal information
- Born: October 19, 1994 (age 32); Baton Rouge, Louisiana, U.S.
- Listed height: 6 ft 2 in (1.88 m)
- Listed weight: 204 lb (93 kg)

Career information
- High school: Madison Prep (Baton Rouge)
- College: Grambling State
- NFL draft: 2017: 3rd round, 98th overall pick

Career history
- Arizona Cardinals (2017–2018); Indianapolis Colts (2019); Kansas City Chiefs (2020–2021)*; New Orleans Breakers (2022); Arlington Renegades (2023)*
- * Offseason or practice squad member only

Career NFL statistics
- Receptions: 20
- Receiving yards: 202
- Receiving touchdowns: 1
- Stats at Pro Football Reference

Chad Williams (born October 19, 1994) is an American former professional football player who was a wide receiver in the National Football League (NFL). He played college football for the Grambling State Tigers. He was selected by the Arizona Cardinals in the third round (98th overall) of the 2017 NFL draft. He has also played for the Indianapolis Colts, Kansas City Chiefs, New Orleans Breakers and Arlington Renegades.

== Professional career ==
Pre-draft measurables
Height	Weight	Arm length	Hand span	40-yard dash	10-yard split	20-yard split	20-yard shuttle	Three-cone drill	Vertical jump	Broad jump	Bench press
6 ft 0 1/2 in (1.84 m)	207 lb (94 kg)	32 in (0.81 m)	9 3/4 in (0.25 m)	4.43 s	1.57 s	2.54 s	4.21 s	7.06 s	35.5 in (0.90 m)	10 ft 3 in (3.12 m)	21 reps
All values from Grambling State's Pro Day

=== Arizona Cardinals ===
The Arizona Cardinals selected Williams in the third round (98th overall) of the 2017 NFL draft. He was the 12th wide receiver drafted in 2017. On May 18, 2017, the Cardinals signed Williams to a four-year, $3.17 million contract that includes a signing bonus of $706,288. On September 17, 2017, in Week 2, he had his first career receptions, a 15-yard pass from quarterback Carson Palmer, in the 16–13 overtime victory over the Indianapolis Colts.

In Week 4 of the 2018 season, Williams scored his first professional touchdown on a 22-yard reception from Josh Rosen in the 20–17 loss to the Seattle Seahawks. He finished the season with 17 receptions for 171 yards and one touchdown.

On August 31, 2019, Williams was waived by the Cardinals.

=== Indianapolis Colts ===
On September 2, 2019, Williams was signed to the practice squad of the Indianapolis Colts. He was promoted to the active roster on December 3, 2019.

Williams was waived with an injury designated by the Colts on August 24, 2020, and subsequently reverted to the team's injured reserve list the next day. He was waived with an injury settlement on September 2, 2020.

=== Kansas City Chiefs ===
Williams was signed to the Kansas City Chiefs' practice squad on September 30, 2020. He was released on November 19, 2020, and re-signed to the practice squad on December 18. He was released on December 22. He signed a reserve/future contract on January 14, 2021. He was released on August 17, 2021.

=== New Orleans Breakers ===
On February 23, 2022, Williams was selected by the New Orleans Breakers of the United States Football League (USFL) in the 2022 USFL draft. Williams won Week 1 Special Teams Player of the Week after a performance in which he blocked a punt vs the Philadelphia Stars. He was released on April 28, 2022.

=== Arlington Renegades ===
Williams was assigned to the Arlington Renegades of the XFL on January 6, 2023.
