= Hayden Hatten =

American football player (born 2000)

Profile
- Position: Wide receiver

Personal information
- Born: August 6, 2000 (age 26); Scottsdale, Arizona, U.S.
- Listed height: 6 ft 1 in (1.85 m)
- Listed weight: 207 lb (94 kg)

Career information
- High school: Saguaro (Scottsdale)
- College: Idaho (2019–2023)
- NFL draft: 2024: undrafted

Career history
- Seattle Seahawks (2024)*; BC Lions (2025)*
- * Offseason or practice squad member only

Awards and highlights
- 2× First-team FCS All-American (2022, 2023); 3× First team All-Big Sky (2021–2023)
- Stats at Pro Football Reference

Hayden Hatten (born August 6, 2000) is an American professional football wide receiver. He played college football for the Idaho Vandals and was signed by the Seahawks as an undrafted free agent after the 2024 NFL draft.

== Early life ==
Hatten attended Saguaro High School in Scottsdale, Arizona. He previously attended Pinnacle High School in Phoenix, Arizona where he recorded 68 receptions for 1,029 yards and 16 touchdowns as junior. After originally being committed to Brown, Hatten flipped his commitment to play college football at the University of Idaho.

== College career ==
After playing relatively sparingly in 2019, Hatten's production increased during the 2021 spring season, tallying 43 receptions for 613 yards and three touchdowns and being named to the First team All-Big Sky. The following season, Hatten would battle a shoulder injury and only appear in three games, catching 12 receptions for 215 yards and three touchdowns. In 2022, he led the FCS and broke the program record for single season receiving touchdowns (16), and finished the season with 1,209 receiving yards, earning All-American honors. In 2023, Hatten recorded 1,231 yards and nine touchdowns before declaring for the 2024 NFL draft on December 15, 2023.

Hatten finished his college career as Idaho's all-time leader in receiving touchdowns with 33 and he finished his career with over 3,000 yards receiving.

Year	Team	Games	Receiving			
Year	Team	GP	Rec	Yards	Avg	TD
2019	Idaho	12	10	181	18.1	2
2020	Idaho	6	43	613	14.3	3
2021	Idaho	3	15	215	14.3	3
2022	Idaho	11	83	1,209	14.6	16
2023	Idaho	13	92	1,226	13.3	9
Career		45	243	3,444	14.2	33

== Professional career ==
Pre-draft measurables
Height	Weight	Arm length	Hand span	40-yard dash	10-yard split	20-yard split	20-yard shuttle	Three-cone drill	Vertical jump	Broad jump	Bench press
6 ft 1 1/4 in (1.86 m)	207 lb (94 kg)	30 3/4 in (0.78 m)	9 1/4 in (0.23 m)	4.70 s	1.61 s	2.63 s	4.22 s	7.17 s	39.0 in (0.99 m)	10 ft 2 in (3.10 m)	14 reps
All values from Pro Day

=== Seattle Seahawks ===
Hatten signed with the Seattle Seahawks as an undrafted free agent on May 3, 2024. He was waived on August 27. On September 10, Hatten was suspended 5 games by the NFL.

=== BC Lions ===
On November 29, 2024, Hatten signed with the BC Lions of the Canadian Football League (CFL). He was released on June 1, 2025.

== Personal life ==
Hatten is of Mexican descent through his mother. His identical twin, Hogan, played with him at Idaho.
