= Josh Rosen =

American football player (born 1997)

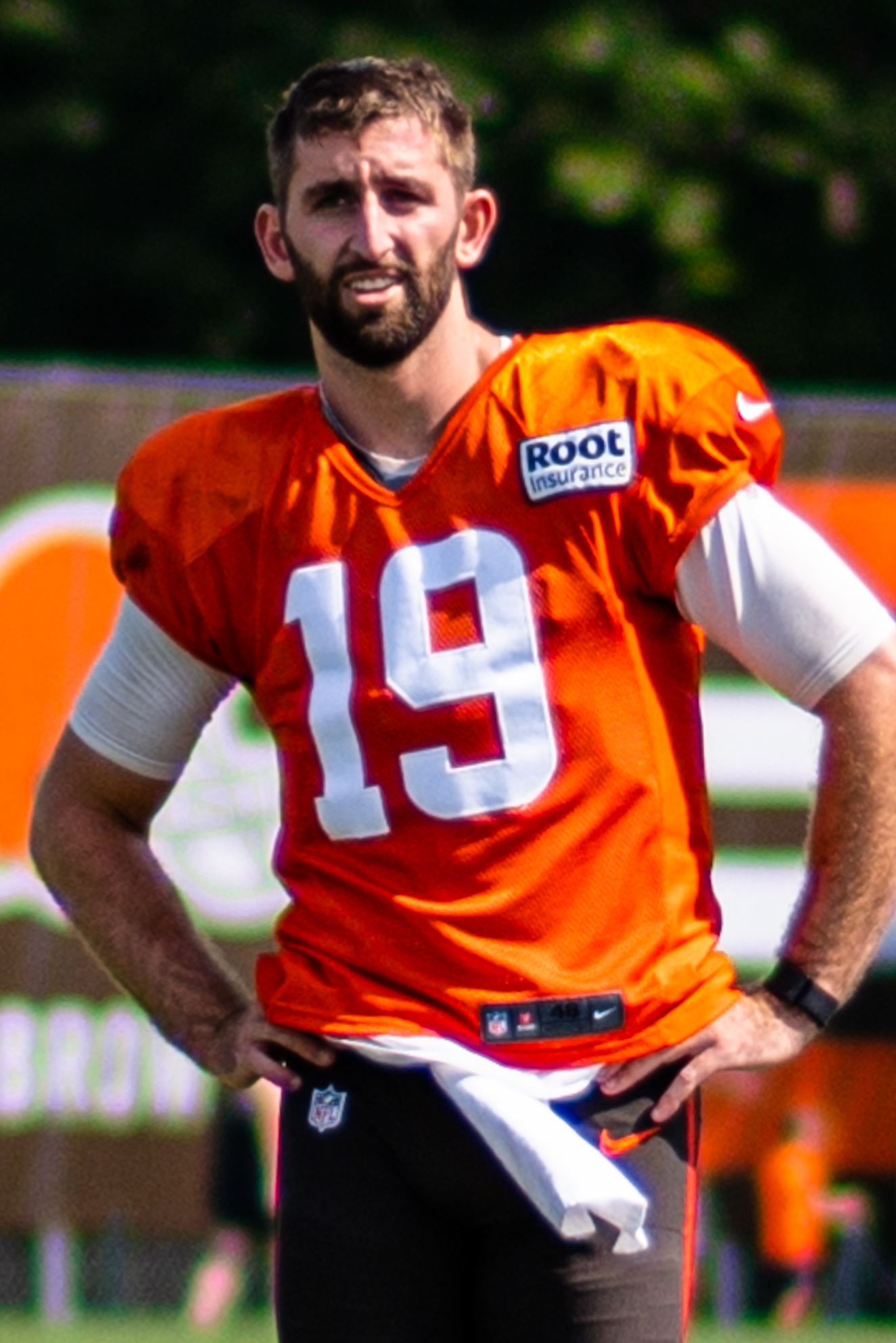
- Rosen with the Cleveland Browns in 2022

No. 3, 16
- Position: Quarterback

Personal information
- Born: February 10, 1997 (age 29); Torrance, California, U.S.
- Listed height: 6 ft 4 in (1.93 m)
- Listed weight: 215 lb (98 kg)

Career information
- High school: St. John Bosco (Bellflower, California)
- College: UCLA (2015–2017)
- NFL draft: 2018: 1st round, 10th overall pick

Career history
- Arizona Cardinals (2018); Miami Dolphins (2019); Tampa Bay Buccaneers (2020)*; San Francisco 49ers (2020); Atlanta Falcons (2021); Cleveland Browns (2022)*; Minnesota Vikings (2022)*
- * Offseason or practice squad member only

Awards and highlights
- Second-team All-Pac-12 (2017); Pac-12 Freshman Offensive Player of the Year (2015); Freshman All-American (2015)

Career NFL statistics
- Passing attempts: 513
- Passing completions: 277
- Completion percentage: 54.0%
- TD–INT: 12–21
- Passing yards: 2,864
- Passer rating: 61.1
- Rushing yards: 151
- Stats at Pro Football Reference

Joshua Ballinger Lippincott Rosen (born February 10, 1997) is an American former professional football quarterback who played in the National Football League (NFL) for four seasons. He played college football for the UCLA Bruins, being named a Freshman All-American and winning Pac-12 Freshman Offensive Player of the Year in 2015. In 2017, Rosen set the school's record for single-season passing yards and earned second-team All-Pac-12 honors.

Rosen was selected 10th overall in the 2018 NFL draft by the Arizona Cardinals. Following an unsuccessful rookie season, he was traded to the Miami Dolphins, where he also struggled and was released after a year. Rosen spent his last two seasons as a backup for the San Francisco 49ers and Atlanta Falcons.

== Early life ==
Rosen was born on February 10, 1997, in Torrance, California, to Charles Rosen, an orthopedic spine surgeon, and Liz Lippincott, a former journalist.

Rosen's father is Jewish and was a nationally ranked ice skater who almost qualified for the Winter Olympics in the 1970s, and his mother is a Quaker, who was the captain of the Princeton lacrosse team. Rosen had a bar mitzvah and identifies as Jewish, saying in 2016: "In retrospect, being Jewish is a big reason why I should have considered UCLA. Just because of how Jewish Hollywood is, and they really want someone to look up to because they just don't have professional athletes." As for his spiritual beliefs, Rosen describes himself as "kind of an atheist."

Rosen is the maternal great-great-great-grandson of Joseph Wharton, the co-founder of Bethlehem Steel and founder of the Wharton School at the University of Pennsylvania, which was named in his honor. Rosen is named after another ancestor, Joshua Ballinger Lippincott, who founded publishing house J. B. Lippincott & Co.

Rosen grew up playing tennis. At age 12, he was the No. 1-ranked player for his age group in Southern California, and ranked nationally in the top-50. Rosen became a top-10 player in junior rankings. He was introduced to football in elementary school by a friend's father who was a youth coach. Right before high school, Rosen switched from tennis to football.

Rosen attended St. John Bosco High School, a Catholic high school in Bellflower, California, where he had a 4.3 GPA. As a senior, Rosen was named the Los Angeles Times Player of the Year and the Long Beach Press-Telegram Dream Team Player of the Year after passing for 3,186 yards, 29 touchdowns, and four interceptions. He was named a 2014 USA Today High School All-American. Rosen was also named the Southern California Jewish Sports Hall of Fame's Male High School Athlete of the Year. During his high school career, he threw for 11,175 yards and 90 touchdowns.

Rosen was rated by both Rivals.com and Scout.com as a five-star recruit and ranked as the best quarterback in his class. Rivals also ranked him as the best overall recruit. He verbally committed to the University of California, Los Angeles (UCLA) in March 2014 before officially signing in September.

== College career ==
=== Freshman year ===
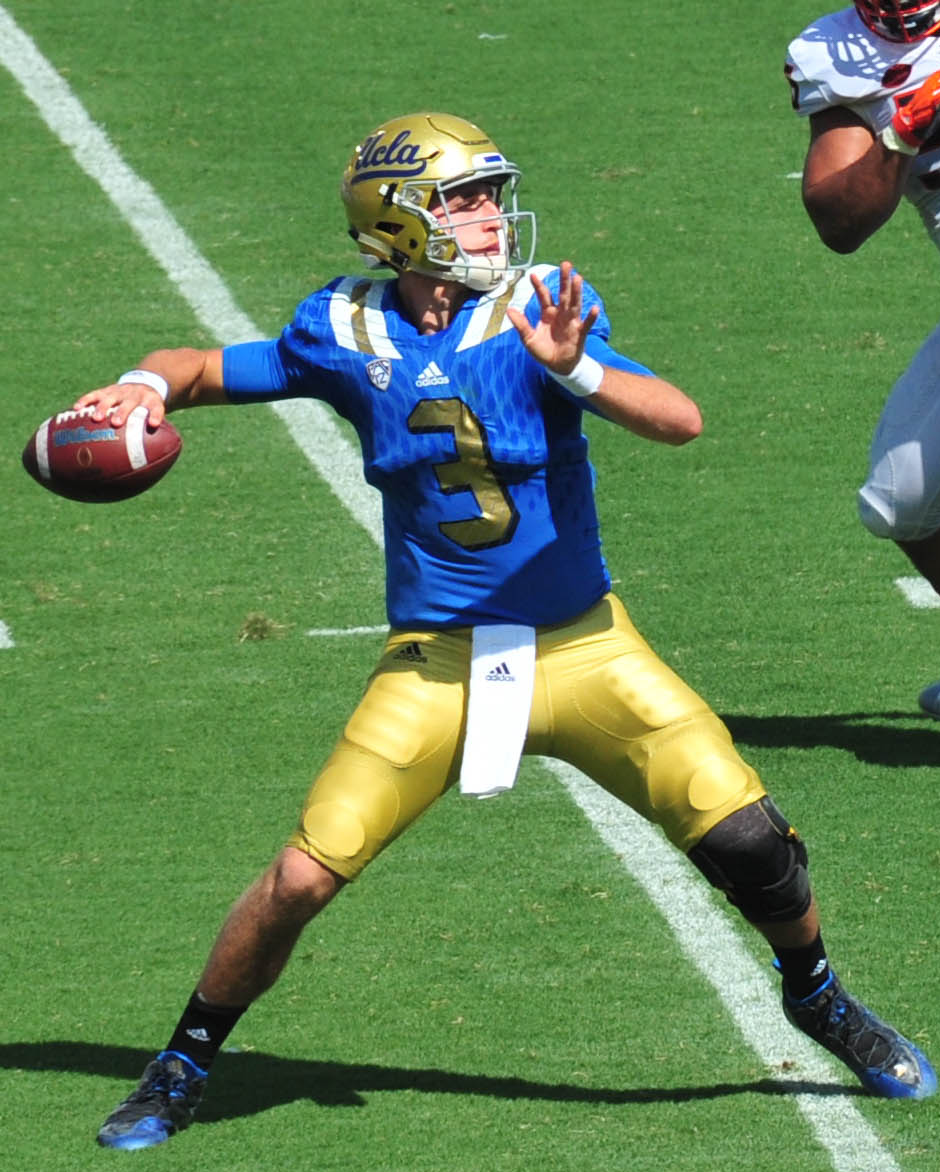
Rosen in 2015

An economics major, Rosen began taking classes at UCLA in January 2015; he enrolled early so he could take part in spring practice. With three-year starting quarterback Brett Hundley leaving UCLA early for the NFL, a large hole was created on the team. Rosen was UCLA's best quarterback during the spring, and he continued to compete during summer camp to be the team's starting quarterback as a true freshman. On August 26, a week after being publicly criticized by head coach Jim Mora, Rosen was named the Bruins' starting quarterback. He beat out Jerry Neuheisel, who had three years of experience in offensive coordinator Noel Mazzone's up-tempo spread offense, which was similar to the offense Rosen ran in high school. The freshman called Neuheisel "selfless" for helping him during the competition.

UCLA entered the 2015 season ranked No. 13 by the Associated Press and No. 14 in the Coaches Poll. During the season opener, Rosen completed 28 of 35 passes for 351 yards and three touchdowns as UCLA defeated Virginia 34–16, and he became the first true freshman to start a season opener at quarterback for UCLA. Rosen was honored as the Walter Camp Offensive Player of the Week. In a 17–9 victory over No. 18 Utah, he broke Drew Olson's decade-old school record (199) for consecutive passes without an interception. The victory kept UCLA in contention for the Pac-12 championship entering their regular-season finale against their crosstown rivals, the USC Trojans. However, they lost 40–21 to the Trojans as Rosen turned the ball over thrice on a fumble and two interceptions, ending his streak of passes without an interception at 245. Rosen was named the Pac-12 Freshman Offensive Player of the Year and earned Freshman All-American honors from USA Today, Sporting News, and Football Writers Association of America (FWAA). He was also named The Sporting News' Freshman of the Year, Pac-12 Conference Offensive Freshman of the Year (coaches), and Pac-12 Newcomer of the Year (AP).

=== Sophomore year ===
In 2016, Rosen was injured in an October 8 loss to Arizona State Sun Devils, when he threw for a then-career high 400 yards. He missed the rest of the season with a shoulder injury. Rosen had surgery on his throwing shoulder to repair soft-tissue damage. UCLA was 3–3 in Rosen's six starts, and he suffered 13 sacks in the shortened season compared to 14 in all of 2015. The Bruins were 1–5 in the final six games and missed bowl eligibility without Rosen.

=== Junior year ===
In the 2017 season opener at the Rose Bowl in Pasadena, California, Rosen completed 35-of-59 passes for 491 yards and four touchdowns to rally UCLA to a narrow 45–44 comeback victory over Texas A&M, capped off by a touchdown pass to Jordan Lasley on a fake spike play with 48 seconds to go in the game. The Bruins overcame a 34-point deficit, the largest comeback in school history and the second-most ever in the Football Bowl Subdivision (FBS). (Note: Michigan State had a 35-point comeback win over Northwestern in 2006.) Texas A&M coach Kevin Sumlin said: "We knew he was smart.... But the thing I was really impressed with was his toughness. We hit him and hit him a lot, and he got better. It's not supposed to work that way ... especially in the fourth quarter."

The following week, Rosen was 22-of-25 for 329 yards and a career-high five touchdowns in a 56–23 victory over Hawaii. It was the 12th 300-yard game of his career, breaking the school record of 11 set previously by Cade McNown. Rosen reached 2,000 yards for the season in five games, the fastest of any player in UCLA history. After five games, he led the nation in passing yards (2,135), total offense (2,158), and touchdowns (17). On October 4, 2017, CBS Sports published a 2018 mock draft that had the Cleveland Browns selecting Rosen with the first overall pick. On October 28, in a 44–23 loss against Washington, Rosen was forced out of the game in the third quarter due to a concussion, which he had tried hiding from coaches after being injured on a sack in the game's opening drive. Rosen completed 12 of 21 passes for 93 yards and a touchdown, the first passing score the Huskies had surrendered in the Pac-12 all season. After missing one game, Rosen returned to the lineup and threw for 381 yards and a touchdown while also scored on a one-yard run in a 44–37 victory over the Arizona State Sun Devils. In his first matchup against USC quarterback Sam Darnold, Rosen was 32 of 52 passing for 421 yards along with three touchdowns and an interception in a 28–23 loss to the Trojans. The two passers were among the top prospects for the 2018 NFL draft. In the regular season finale against California, Rosen led the Bruins to a 17–9 lead at the half, but was held out the rest of the game after suffering his second concussion. He suffered three sacks, including one late in the second quarter when he was slow to get up after being thrown to the ground. He finished 13-of-18 passing for 202 yards and two touchdowns, and the Bruins won 30–27 to become bowl-eligible.

After leading the conference in passing yards per game, Rosen was voted second-team All-Pac-12. He was retroactively credited with a 39-yard pass to Eldridge Massington that was originally ruled a run against Arizona State. It pushed his season total to 3,756 yards passing, breaking Brett Hundley's single season school record of 3,740 in 2012. Rosen missed the Cactus Bowl after doctors did not clear him to play.

On January 3, 2018, Rosen announced his intentions to enter the 2018 NFL draft. During his time at UCLA, Rosen was nicknamed "Chosen Rosen" and the "Chosen One".

== Professional career ==
Pre-draft measurables
Height	Weight	Arm length	Hand span	40-yard dash	10-yard split	20-yard split	20-yard shuttle	Three-cone drill	Vertical jump	Broad jump	Wonderlic
6 ft 4 in (1.93 m)	226 lb (103 kg)	31 3/4 in (0.81 m)	9 7/8 in (0.25 m)	4.92 s	1.71 s	2.84 s	4.28 s	7.09 s	31 in (0.79 m)	9 ft 3 in (2.82 m)	29
All values from NFL Combine

=== Arizona Cardinals ===
Considered by many to be the "most NFL-ready" quarterback prospect in the draft, Rosen was selected by the Arizona Cardinals in the first round with the 10th overall pick of the 2018 NFL draft. They traded a first-, third-, and fifth-round pick in order to move up five spots to select him. Rosen was the fourth of five quarterbacks chosen in the first round that year. In a press conference following the draft, he referred to the selections made before him as "nine mistakes".

On May 10, 2018, Rosen signed a four-year deal worth $17.84 million with an $11 million signing bonus. During training camp, Rosen won the backup position over Mike Glennon. He made his first regular season appearance in Week 3, replacing starter Sam Bradford with 4:31 remaining against the Chicago Bears and the Cardinals trailing 16–14. Arizona lost the game to fall to 0–3, while Rosen completed four of seven passes for 36 yards and an interception. Entering the game, the Cardinals had scored just six points and ranked last in a number of offensive categories, but jumped out to a 14–0 first quarter lead before six scoreless possessions prompted Arizona coach Steve Wilks to switch to Rosen.

On September 24, the Cardinals named Rosen the starting quarterback for Week 4. In his first career start, Rosen passed for 180 yards and a touchdown during the 20–17 loss to the Seattle Seahawks. He helped the Cardinals earn their first win the following week against the San Francisco 49ers, when he completed 10 of 25 passes for 170 yards, including a 75-yard touchdown pass to fellow rookie receiver Christian Kirk. Two weeks later, Rosen had two of his three interceptions returned for touchdowns, lost two fumbles, and was sacked six times in a 45–10 loss to the Denver Broncos on Thursday Night Football. Still ranked among the worst offenses in the league, Arizona fired offensive coordinator Mike McCoy and replaced him with their quarterback coach, Byron Leftwich.

During Week 8, Rosen led the Cardinals to an 18–15 comeback victory for a season sweep over the 49ers. He threw a career-high 252 passing yards and two touchdowns, including the game-winning score to Kirk with 34 seconds remaining to rally the team from a 15–3 fourth-quarter deficit. During Week 13, Rosen completed 11 of 26 passes for 149 yards to upset the Green Bay Packers at home 20–17. The loss, in which the Packers were 14-point favorites, ended Super Bowl-winning head coach Mike McCarthy's tenure in Green Bay; he was fired three hours after the game ended.

Rosen finished his rookie season with 2,278 passing yards, 11 touchdowns, and 14 interceptions as the Cardinals finished 3–13 (3–10 with Rosen as starter). His 66.7 passer rating was the worst among qualified passers that year. Rosen praised his teammates during the season, and resisted criticizing the team's unimaginative playcalling or weak offensive line and receiving corps. Arizona fired Wilks after the season and replaced him with Kliff Kingsbury, who declared that "Josh is our guy". The new coach, while coaching in college in 2018, had said that he would pick quarterback Kyler Murray if he had the first overall NFL draft pick.

=== Miami Dolphins ===
On April 26, 2019, after the Cardinals selected Murray first overall in the 2019 NFL draft, Rosen was traded to the Miami Dolphins in exchange for the Dolphins' 2019 second-round pick and their fifth-round pick in the 2020 draft. Arizona general manager Steve Keim attributed the trade to the value they received and said that "all of us are big fans of Josh Rosen". Josh Weinfuss of ESPN wrote that Rosen would have most likely been traded even if he had "put up big numbers" as a rookie.

Rosen was named the backup to Ryan Fitzpatrick to start the season. The Dolphins started the year 0–2 and were outscored 102–10. After relieving Fitzpatrick in both contests, Rosen was named the starter for Week 3, and threw for 200 yards as the Dolphins lost 31–6 to the Dallas Cowboys. During Week 4 against the Los Angeles Chargers, he threw for 180 yards, a touchdown, and an interception in a 30–10 loss. Rosen's touchdown pass was his first and only as a member of the Dolphins. Following a Week 5 bye week, Rosen started against the Washington Redskins, but was benched for Fitzpatrick after three quarters while throwing for only 85 yards and two interceptions. The Dolphins lost 17–16. Rosen only appeared in one other game in 2019, serving as Fitzpatrick's backup for the rest of the season.

The following offseason, the Dolphins drafted quarterback Tua Tagovailoa fifth overall in the 2020 NFL draft. Rosen was unable to surpass either Tagovailoa or Fitzpatrick on the depth chart, and Miami waived him on September 5, 2020, after failing to find a trade partner.

=== Tampa Bay Buccaneers ===
On September 8, 2020, Rosen signed onto the practice squad of the Tampa Bay Buccaneers.

=== San Francisco 49ers ===
On December 23, 2020, Rosen was signed by the 49ers off of the Buccaneers' practice squad following injuries to quarterbacks Jimmy Garoppolo and Nick Mullens, and practice squad quarterback Josh Johnson being placed on the reserve/COVID-19 list. Rosen was active for the 49ers for their final two games, but did not see any action.

On February 8, 2021, the 49ers signed Rosen to a one-year contract extension. On August 17, Rosen was waived by the 49ers after struggling to compete for the third quarterback spot behind Garoppolo and 2021 first round draft pick Trey Lance.

=== Atlanta Falcons ===
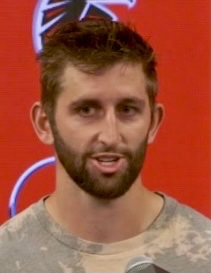
Rosen in 2021

Following a season-ending injury to second-string quarterback A. J. McCarron, Rosen signed with the Atlanta Falcons on August 24, 2021. He was named the second-string quarterback for the season opener behind incumbent starter Matt Ryan and ahead of undrafted rookie Feleipe Franks.

Rosen made his season debut in Week 2 against the Tampa Bay Buccaneers when he replaced Ryan for the Falcons' final drive. Rosen made two pass attempts, both of which were incomplete, during the 48–25 road loss.

During Week 10 against the Dallas Cowboys, Rosen again relieved a struggling Ryan during the third quarter. He completed one of six passes for 14 yards and was intercepted by cornerback Jourdan Lewis in the 43–3 road loss. The following week against the New England Patriots, Rosen made a third relief appearance in the fourth quarter after Ryan threw two interceptions on consecutive drives. Rosen completed one of two pass attempts before throwing an interception to linebacker Kyle Van Noy that was returned for a touchdown. He was replaced on the Falcons' final drive by Franks, who was also intercepted to end the 25–0 shutout loss.

=== Cleveland Browns ===
On July 21, 2022, the Cleveland Browns signed Rosen to a one-year contract. They terminated his contract on August 30, before signing him to their practice squad two days later. Rosen was released on October 10.

=== Minnesota Vikings ===
On December 20, 2022, Rosen was signed to the Minnesota Vikings practice squad. His practice squad contract with the team expired after the season on January 15, 2023.

=== Legacy ===
Due to his highly touted potential, high draft pick, and lack of success to show for it, some sources have listed Rosen among the biggest draft busts in the history of the NFL and Arizona Cardinals. The cause of his failure in the NFL has been debated among fans and analysts. Some argued that Rosen never had a stable offensive line, a capable coach, or a stable offensive system in Arizona and Miami before being relegated to being a backup. Others cited his lack of mobility, anticipation, and athleticism compared to many of his NFL peers and his lack of adjustment to the professional level. Regardless, Rosen never spent more than one full season with any team, becoming the only first-round quarterback to be jettisoned from the team that drafted him after playing only one season for it, (Note: John Elway, Eli Manning, and Philip Rivers were traded immediately following their selections and never played for the teams that originally drafted them.) and having been on seven teams throughout his five-year career. The Cardinals, Dolphins, and 49ers each spent a first-round draft pick on a quarterback the year after playing Rosen before cutting or trading him.

== Career statistics ==
=== NFL ===
Year	Team	Games			Passing								Rushing				Sacks		Fumbles	
Year	Team	GP	GS	Record	Cmp	Att	Pct	Yds	Avg	TD	Int	Rtg	Att	Yds	Avg	TD	Sck	SckY	Fum	Lost
2018	ARI	14	13	3−10	217	393	55.2	2,278	5.8	11	14	66.7	23	138	6.0	0	45	320	10	5
2019	MIA	6	3	0−3	58	109	53.2	567	5.2	1	5	52.0	3	13	4.3	0	16	93	1	0
2020	SF	0	0	—	DNP															
2021	ATL	4	0	—	2	11	18.2	19	1.7	0	2	0.0	0	0	0.0	0	0	0	0	0
Career		24	16	3−13	277	513	54.0	2,864	5.6	12	21	61.1	26	151	5.8	0	61	413	11	5

=== College ===
Season	Team	GP	Passing							
Season	Team	GP	Cmp	Att	Pct	Yds	Avg	TD	Int	Rtg
2015	UCLA	13	292	487	60.0	3,670	7.5	23	11	134.3
2016	UCLA	6	137	231	59.3	1,915	8.3	10	5	138.9
2017	UCLA	11	283	452	62.5	3,756	8.3	26	10	147.0
Career		30	712	1,170	60.9	9,341	8.0	59	26	140.1

== Personal life ==
As of 2024, Rosen is a student at the Wharton School at the University of Pennsylvania.

== See also ==
- List of Jews in sports § American football
