= Joe Davidson (American football) =

American football player (1903–1982)

Profile
- Positions: Guard, center

Personal information
- Born: January 24, 1903; Durand, Michigan, U.S.
- Died: May 14, 1982 (aged 79); Dallas, Texas, U.S.
- Listed height: 6 ft 0 in (1.83 m)
- Listed weight: 200 lb (91 kg)

Career information
- High school: Ovid (MI)
- College: Colgate, Oklahoma A&M

Career history
- Chicago Cardinals (1928)

Joseph Burl Davidson (January 24, 1903 – May 14, 1982) was an American football player.

== Early life ==
Davidson was born in 1903 in Durand, Michigan. He attended Ovid High School in Michigan and then enrolled at Colgate University. He played college football for Colgate in 1924 and for Oklahoma A&M in 1926. He also played lacrosse at Colgate.

== Professional football ==
Davidson also played professional football in the National Football League (NFL) as a guard and center for the Chicago Cardinals (1928). He appeared in 12 NFL games, eight as a starter. He was a roommate of Jim Thorpe while playing with the Cardinals.

== Later life ==
After his football career ended, Davidson worked for 12 years for the U.S. Department of Agriculture in Illinois as a forester and wildlife technician. He became superintendent of game management for the Illinois Department of Conservation stating in 1945 and held that position until 1953. He moved to Tyler, Texas, in approximately 1960. He worked as a wildlife biologist with the Texas Parks and Wildlife Department. He died in 1982 at a hospital in Dallas, Texas.
