= Rick Lord =

American film producer

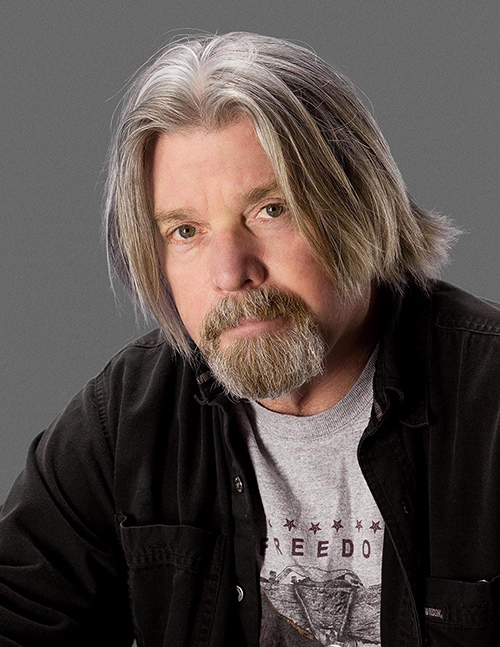
- Born: Richard Michael Lord; August 25, 1954 (age 71); Inglewood, California, United States
- Died: April 18, 2025
- Occupations: author, actor, director, producer, gaffer
- Years active: 1983 – 2025
- Spouse: Jackie Lord
- Children: David Lord, Randy Lord, Christie Lee

Richard Michael Lord (born August 25, 1954 in Inglewood, California) is an American film actor, producer, director, gaffer and author. He is perhaps most known for being a co-founder of Matchlight Films along with brothers Phillip Wade and Tim Wade. He is author of the book "A Gaffer's Perspective on Independent Filmmaking".

== Filmography ==
Film

Year	Title	Credit	Role	Notes
1992	Jessica: A Ghost Story	actor	Man in Bar	
2001	Down and Out with the Dolls	gaffer		
2004	Harvest of Fear	gaffer		
2005	Bigger Than the Sky	best boy electric		
2005	Nearing Grace	electrician		
2006	Just Yell Fire	gaffer		
2006	Punk Love	gaffer		
2013	Terrible Angels	actor	The Judge	
2013	Rock Bottom	writer, director, actor,	Matt	short film
2013	Angel's Wings: A Gift Returned	writer, director,		short film
2014	Chryzinium	writer, director, actor,	John Gussman	short film
