= 2020 Arizona Cardinals season =

101st season in franchise history

- Owner: Michael Bidwill
- General manager: Steve Keim
- Head coach: Kliff Kingsbury
- Home stadium: State Farm Stadium

Results
- Record: 8–8
- Division place: 3rd NFC West
- Playoffs: Did not qualify
- Pro Bowlers: QB Kyler Murray; WR DeAndre Hopkins; SS Budda Baker
- Team MVP: DeAndre Hopkins
- Team ROY: Isaiah Simmons

Uniform
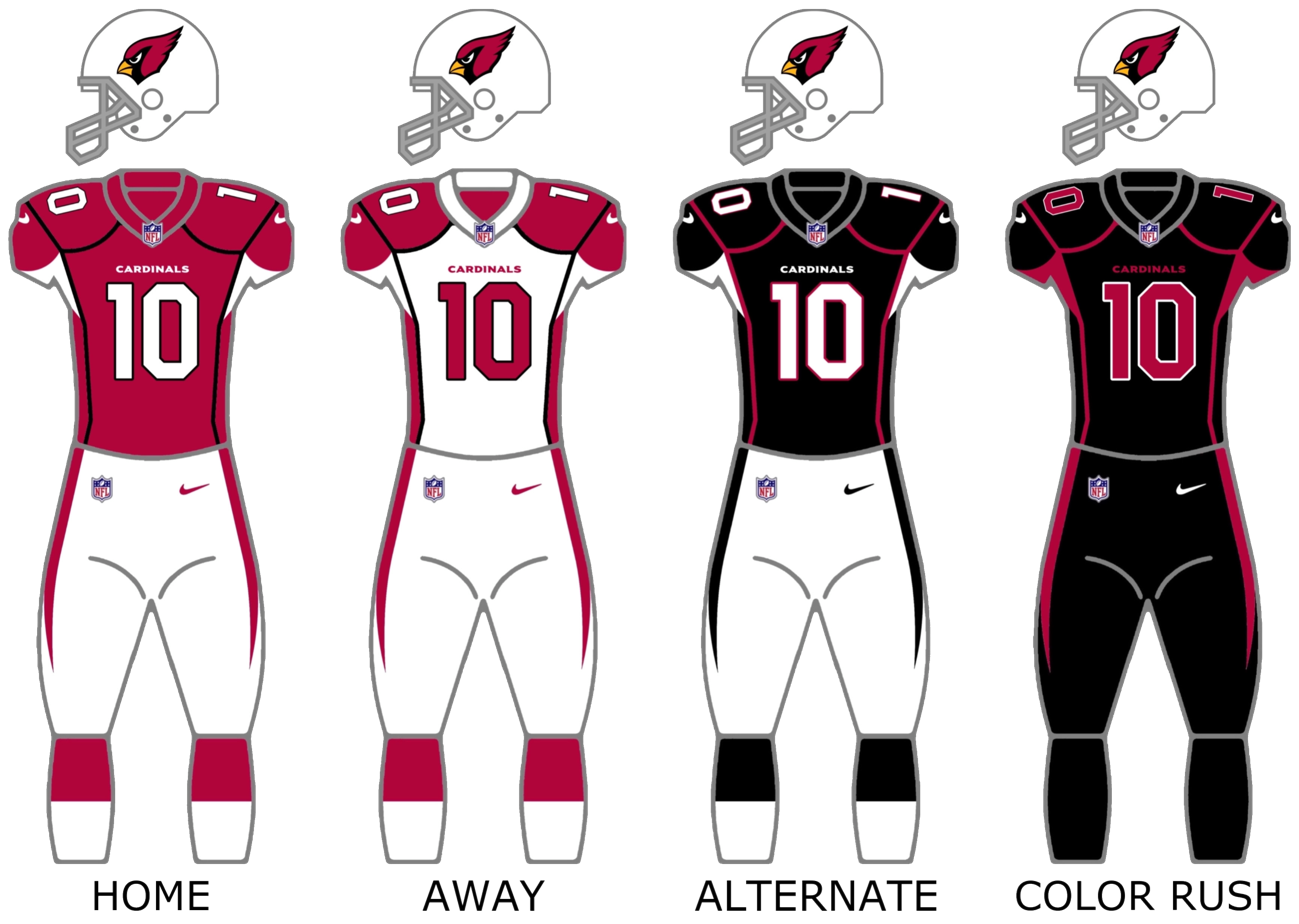

The 2020 season was the Arizona Cardinals' 101st in the National Football League (NFL), their 33rd in Arizona and their second under head coach Kliff Kingsbury. It was also the first full season since 1971 without the ownership of Bill Bidwill, who died during the 2019 season.

The team improved on their 5–10–1 record from the previous year beginning the season 6–3; however, the Cardinals suffered a late season collapse, losing five of their last seven games and missed the playoffs for the fifth consecutive season after losing to the rival Los Angeles Rams in Week 17. The Cardinals finished tied with the Chicago Bears for the last Wild Card spot, but lost the tiebreaker.

The 2020 season featured the Hail Murray, as during Week 10 on November 15, trailing the Buffalo Bills 30–26 with eleven seconds remaining in the fourth quarter, Kyler Murray completed a 43-yard Hail Mary touchdown pass to DeAndre Hopkins with one second remaining to lift the Cardinals over the Bills in a miraculous 32–30 victory.

== Roster changes ==
=== Free agents ===
Position	Player	Tag	2020 team	Notes
WR	Larry Fitzgerald	UFA	Arizona Cardinals	1 year
OT	Marcus Gilbert	UFA	Arizona Cardinals	1 year
OT	D. J. Humphries	UFA	Arizona Cardinals	3 years
OG	Max Garcia	UFA	Arizona Cardinals	1 year
TE	Charles Clay	UFA	TBD	TBD
QB	Brett Hundley	UFA	Arizona Cardinals	1 year
DE	Rodney Gunter	UFA	Jacksonville Jaguars	3 years
LB	Brooks Reed	UFA	Tennessee Titans	1 year
C	A.Q. Shipley	UFA	Tampa Bay Buccaneers	1 year
OT	Jordan Mills	UFA	TBD	TBD
DE	Clinton McDonald	UFA	TBD	TBD
DT	Cassius Marsh	UFA	Jacksonville Jaguars	1 year
CB	Josh Shaw	UFA	TBD	TBD
DT	Jonathan Bullard	UFA	Arizona Cardinals	1 year
RB	Kenyan Drake	UFA	Arizona Cardinals	1 year
NT	Zach Kerr	UFA	Carolina Panthers	2 years
NT	Caraun Reid	UFA	Jacksonville Jaguars	1 year
S	Chris Banjo	UFA	Arizona Cardinals	1 year
CB	Brandon Williams	UFA	New York Giants	4 years
WR	Pharoh Cooper	UFA	Carolina Panthers	1 year
WR	Damiere Byrd	UFA	New England Patriots	1 year
S	Charles Washington	UFA	Arizona Cardinals	1 year
RB	D. J. Foster	UFA	Arizona Cardinals	1 year
LB	Keishawn Bierria	UFA	TBD	TBD
LB	Joe Walker	UFA	San Francisco 49ers	1 year
K	Zane Gonzalez	UFA	Arizona Cardinals	1 year
OT	William Sweet	UFA	San Francisco 49ers	1 year
OT	Justin Murray	UFA	Arizona Cardinals	1 year
CB	Kevin Peterson	UFA	Arizona Cardinals	1 year

Player re-signed by the Cardinals	Player not re-signed by the Cardinals

=== Signings ===
Position	Player	Tag	2019 team	Date signed	Notes
DT	Jordan Phillips	UFA	Buffalo Bills	March 19	3 years, $30 million
LB	Devon Kennard	UFA	Detroit Lions	March 19	3 years, $20 million
LB	De'Vondre Campbell	UFA	Atlanta Falcons	March 19	1 year, $6 million
DT	Trevon Coley	UFA	Indianapolis Colts	March 25	1 year, $825,000

=== Trades ===
- March 20: The Cardinals traded a second-round pick in the 2020 NFL draft, a fourth-round pick in the 2021 NFL draft and RB David Johnson to the Houston Texans for WR DeAndre Hopkins.

=== Draft ===
2020 Arizona Cardinals Draft
Round	Selection	Player	Position	College	Notes
1	8	Isaiah Simmons	OLB	Clemson	
3	72	Josh Jones	OT	Houston	
4	114	Leki Fotu	DT	Utah	
4	131	Rashard Lawrence	DT	LSU	from Houston
6	202	Evan Weaver	LB	California	from New England
7	222	Eno Benjamin	RB	Arizona State	

Notes

- The Cardinals will forfeit their fifth-round selection after selecting safety Jalen Thompson in the 2019 supplemental draft.
- The Cardinals traded their sixth-round selection to the Cleveland Browns in exchange for cornerback Jamar Taylor.
- The Cardinals acquired a 2020 sixth-round pick from the New England Patriots in exchange for offensive tackle Korey Cunningham.
- The Cardinals traded their 2020 second-round selection, as well as a fourth-round selection in the 2021 NFL draft and running back David Johnson to the Houston Texans in exchange for wide receiver DeAndre Hopkins and a 2020 fourth-round selection.

Undrafted free agents
Player	Position	College
Ryan Becker	TE	SMU
Jake Benzinger	OT	Wake Forest
Jermiah Braswell	WR	Youngstown State
T.J. Carter	DT	Kentucky
Jackson Dennis	OT	Holy Cross
Drew Dickinson	OG	Findlay
Reggie Floyd	DB	Virginia Tech
Steven Gonzalez	OT	Penn State
Parker Houston	TE	San Diego State
Noah Togiai	TE	Oregon State
Shane Leatherbury	WR	Towson
Zane Lewis	DB	Air Force
Rashad Medaris	WR	Cincinnati
Devin Phelps	WR	Shepherd
Adam Shuler	DT	Florida
Reggie Walker	LB	Kansas State
JoJo Ward	WR	Hawaii
Jonathan Ward	RB	Central Michigan
Jace Whittaker	DB	Arizona
Jarren Williams	DB	Albany
Bejour Wilson	DB	Liberty

== Staff ==
2020 Arizona Cardinals staff
Front office: Owner – Bidwill family; Chairman/president – Michael Bidwill; General manager – Steve Keim; Director of player personnel – Quentin Harris; Assistant director of player personnel – Dru Grigson; Vice president of player personnel – Terry McDonough; Director of college scouting – Chris Culmer; Director of pro scouting – Adrian Wilson; Director of football administration – Matt Harriss; Director of football operations – Matt Caracciolo; Head coaches: Head coach – Kliff Kingsbury; Assistant head coach/special teams coordinator – Jeff Rodgers; Offensive coaches: Pass game coordinator/quarterbacks – Tom Clements; Running backs – James Saxon; Wide receivers – David Raih; Assistant wide receivers – Spencer Whipple; Tight ends – Steve Heiden; Offensive line – Sean Kugler; Assistant offensive line – Brian Natkin; Offensive assistant/assistant quarterbacks – Cameron Turner; Offensive assistant – Jerry Sullivan; Offensive assistant – Don Shumpert; Offensive quality control – Jim Dray; Bill bidwill coaching fellowship/assistant quarterbacks – Jordan Hogan	Defensive coaches: Defensive coordinator – Vance Joseph; Defensive line – Brentson Buckner; Linebackers – Billy Davis; Outside linebackers – Charlie Bullen; Defensive backs – Marcus Robertson; Cornerbacks – Greg Williams; Defensive assistant – Rusty McKinney; Defensive quality control – Rob Grosso; Special teams coaches: Assistant special teams – Derius Swinton; Strength and conditioning: Strength and conditioning – Buddy Morris; Assistant strength and conditioning – Mark Naylor

== Final roster ==
2020 Arizona Cardinals roster
Quarterbacks (QB): 7 Brett Hundley; 1 Kyler Murray; 15 Chris Streveler; Running backs (RB): 26 Eno Benjamin; 41 Kenyan Drake; 29 Chase Edmonds; 37 D. J. Foster; 38 Jonathan Ward; Wide receivers (WR): 11 Larry Fitzgerald; 10 DeAndre Hopkins; 17 Andy Isabella; 19 KeeSean Johnson; 16 Trent Sherfield; Tight ends (TE): 85 Dan Arnold; 81 Darrell Daniels; 86 Seth DeValve; 87 Maxx Williams	Offensive linemen (OL): 68 Kelvin Beachum T; 52 Mason Cole C; 53 Lamont Gaillard C; 73 Max Garcia G; 74 D. J. Humphries T; 79 Josh Jones T; 66 Joshua Miles T; 71 Justin Murray G; 67 Justin Pugh G; 64 J. R. Sweezy G; Defensive linemen (DL): 94 Zach Allen DE; 96 Angelo Blackson DE; 95 Leki Fotu DE; 92 Rashard Lawrence NT; 65 Stacy McGee DE; 90 Domata Peko NT	Linebackers (LB): 59 De'Vondre Campbell ILB; 44 Markus Golden OLB; 58 Jordan Hicks ILB; 42 Devon Kennard OLB; 43 Haason Reddick OLB; 48 Isaiah Simmons OLB; 54 Terrance Smith ILB; 47 Ezekiel Turner ILB; 51 Tanner Vallejo ILB; Defensive backs (DB): 32 Budda Baker FS; 20 Dre Kirkpatrick CB; 33 Byron Murphy CB; 27 Kevin Peterson CB; 21 Patrick Peterson CB; 22 Deionte Thompson SS; 34 Jalen Thompson SS; 28 Charles Washington FS; 39 Jace Whittaker CB; Special teams (ST): 46 Aaron Brewer LS; 4 Andy Lee P; 2 Mike Nugent K	Practice squad: 36 Prince Amukamara CB; 89 Evan Baylis TE; 91 Michael Dogbe DE; 18 Krishawn Hogan WR; 6 Brett Maher K; 60 Koda Martin G; 30 Chris Miller SS; 35 Picasso Nelson CB; 83 A. J. Richardson WR (PS/I); 56 Reggie Walker OLB; 14 JoJo Ward WR; 50 Evan Weaver ILB; 12 Isaac Whitney WR; Reserve: 23 Robert Alford CB (IR); 31 Chris Banjo SS (COVID-19); 49 Kylie Fitts OLB (IR); 45 Dennis Gardeck OLB (IR); 76 Marcus Gilbert T (Opt-out); 5 Zane Gonzalez K (IR); 54 Isaiah Irving OLB (IR); 55 Chandler Jones OLB (IR); 25 Johnathan Joseph CB (IR); 13 Christian Kirk WR (COVID-19); 69 Josh Mauro DE (IR/DFR); 98 Corey Peters NT (IR); 97 Jordan Phillips DE (IR); Rookies in italics 54 active, 13 reserve, 12 practice squad (1 exempt)

== Preseason ==
The Cardinals' preseason schedule was announced on May 7, but was later canceled due to the COVID-19 pandemic.

Week	Date	Opponent	Venue	Result
1	August 15	at Green Bay Packers	Lambeau Field	Canceled due to the COVID-19 pandemic
2	August 22	Kansas City Chiefs	State Farm Stadium	Canceled due to the COVID-19 pandemic
3	August 27	at Las Vegas Raiders	Allegiant Stadium	Canceled due to the COVID-19 pandemic
4	September 3	Denver Broncos	State Farm Stadium	Canceled due to the COVID-19 pandemic

== Regular season ==
=== Schedule ===
The Cardinals' 2020 schedule was announced on May 7.

Week	Date	Opponent	Result	Record	Venue	Recap
1	September 13	at **San Francisco 49ers**	**W** 24–20	1–0	Levi's Stadium	Recap
2	September 20	Washington Football Team	**W** 30–15	2–0	State Farm Stadium	Recap
3	September 27	Detroit Lions	**L** 23–26	2–1	State Farm Stadium	Recap
4	October 4	at Carolina Panthers	**L** 21–31	2–2	Bank of America Stadium	Recap
5	October 11	at New York Jets	**W** 30–10	3–2	MetLife Stadium	Recap
6	October 19	at Dallas Cowboys	**W** 38–10	4–2	AT&T Stadium	Recap
7	October 25	**Seattle Seahawks**	**W** 37–34 (OT)	5–2	State Farm Stadium	Recap
8	Bye					
9	November 8	Miami Dolphins	**L** 31–34	5–3	State Farm Stadium	Recap
10	November 15	Buffalo Bills	**W** 32–30	6–3	State Farm Stadium	Recap
11	November 19	at **Seattle Seahawks**	**L** 21–28	6–4	Lumen Field	Recap
12	November 29	at New England Patriots	**L** 17–20	6–5	Gillette Stadium	Recap
13	December 6	**Los Angeles Rams**	**L** 28–38	6–6	State Farm Stadium	Recap
14	December 13	at New York Giants	**W** 26–7	7–6	MetLife Stadium	Recap
15	December 20	Philadelphia Eagles	**W** 33–26	8–6	State Farm Stadium	Recap
16	December 26	**San Francisco 49ers**	**L** 12–20	8–7	State Farm Stadium	Recap
17	January 3	at **Los Angeles Rams**	**L** 7–18	8–8	SoFi Stadium	Recap

Notes

- Intra-division opponents are in **bold** text.

=== Game summaries ===
==== Week 1: at San Francisco 49ers ====
Week 1: Arizona Cardinals at San Francisco 49ers – Game summary

Quarter	1	2	3	4	Total
**Cardinals**	7	3	0	14	**24**
49ers	10	3	0	7	**20**

at Levi's Stadium, Santa Clara, California

- Date: September 13
- Game time: 1:25 p.m. MST & PDT
- Game weather: Hazy, 66 °F (19 °C)
- Game attendance: 0
- Referee: Carl Cheffers
- TV announcers (Fox): Kevin Kugler, Chris Spielman and Laura Okmin
- Recap, Game Book

Game information

**First quarter**

- SF – Robbie Gould 52-yard field goal, 11:50. 49ers 3–0. **Drive: 6 plays, 41 yards, 3:10.**
- SF – Raheem Mostert 76-yard pass from Jimmy Garoppolo (Robbie Gould kick), 9:53. 49ers 10–0. **Drive: 1 play, 76 yards, 0:12.**
- ARI – Chase Edmonds 10-yard pass from Kyler Murray (Zane Gonzalez kick), 6:55. 49ers 10–7. **Drive: 1 play, 10 yards, 0:10.**

**Second quarter**

- SF – Robbie Gould 24-yard field goal, 0:30. 49ers 13–7. **Drive: 6 plays, 20 yards, 1:59.**
- ARI – Zane Gonzalez 56-yard field goal, 0:00. 49ers 13–10. **Drive: 6 plays, 37 yards, 0:30.**

**Third quarter**

- No scoring plays.

**Fourth quarter**

- ARI – Kyler Murray 22-yard run (Zane Gonzalez kick), 10:26. Cardinals 17–13. **Drive: 14 plays, 94 yards, 6:48.**
- SF – Jerick McKinnon 5-yard pass from Jimmy Garoppolo (Robbie Gould kick), 8:38. 49ers 20–17. **Drive: 6 plays, 78 yards, 1:48.**
- ARI – Kenyan Drake 1-yard run (Zane Gonzalez kick), 5:03. Cardinals 24–20. **Drive: 9 plays, 75 yards, 3:35.**

**Top passers**

- ARI – Kyler Murray – 26/40, 230 yards, TD, INT
- SF – Jimmy Garoppolo – 19/33, 259 yards, 2 TD

**Top rushers**

- ARI – Kyler Murray – 13 rushes, 91 yards, TD
- SF – Raheem Mostert – 15 rushes, 56 yards

**Top receivers**

- ARI – DeAndre Hopkins – 14 receptions, 151 yards
- SF – Raheem Mostert – 4 reception, 95 yards, TD

With the win, the Cardinals won their first game of the season for the first time since 2015 and the first time in an away game since 2010.

==== Week 2: vs. Washington Football Team ====
Week 2: Washington Football Team at Arizona Cardinals – Game summary

Quarter	1	2	3	4	Total
Washington	0	0	3	12	**15**
**Cardinals**	14	6	0	10	**30**

at State Farm Stadium, Glendale, Arizona

- Date: September 20
- Game time: 1:05 p.m. MST
- Game weather: None (retractable roof closed)
- Game attendance: 0
- Referee: Land Clark
- TV announcers (Fox): Dick Stockton, Brady Quinn and Sara Walsh
- Recap, Game Book

Game information

**First quarter**

- ARI – DeAndre Hopkins 4-yard pass from Kyler Murray (Zane Gonzalez kick), 9:09. Cardinals 7–0. **Drive: 10 plays, 48 yards, 4:22.**
- ARI – Kyler Murray 14-yard run (Zane Gonzalez kick), 0:00. Cardinals 14–0. **Drive: 6 plays, 20 yards, 2:44.**

**Second quarter**

- ARI – Zane Gonzalez 49-yard field goal, 11:29. Cardinals 17–0. **Drive: 5 plays, 46 yards, 1:47.**
- ARI – Zane Gonzalez 33-yard field goal, 1:49. Cardinals 20–0. **Drive: 10 plays, 75 yards, 4:03.**

**Third quarter**

- WAS – Dustin Hopkins 24-yard field goal, 3:14. Cardinals 20–3. **Drive: 10 plays, 51 yards, 4:55.**

**Fourth quarter**

- ARI – Kyler Murray 21-yard run (Zane Gonzalez kick), 14:17. Cardinals 27–3. **Drive: 12 plays, 75 yards, 3:57.**
- WAS – Terry McLaurin 24-yard pass from Dwayne Haskins (run failed), 12:20. Cardinals 27–9. **Drive: 5 plays, 75 yards, 1:57.**
- WAS – Antonio Gibson 11-yard run (pass failed), 6:38. Cardinals 27–15. **Drive: 9 plays, 78 yards, 2:55.**
- ARI – Zane Gonzalez 28-yard field goal, 0:26. Cardinals 30–15. **Drive: 11 plays, 74 yards, 6:12.**

**Top passers**

- WAS – Dwayne Haskins – 19/33, 223 yards, TD
- ARI – Kyler Murray – 26/38, 286 yards, TD, INT

**Top rushers**

- WAS – Antonio Gibson – 13 rushes, 55 yards, TD
- ARI – Kenyan Drake – 20 rushers, 86 yards

**Top receivers**

- WAS – Terry McLaurin – 7 receptions, 125 yards, TD
- ARI – DeAndre Hopkins – 8 receptions, 68 yards, TD

With this win, the Cardinals started 2-0 for the first time since 2015.

==== Week 3: vs. Detroit Lions ====
Week 3: Detroit Lions at Arizona Cardinals – Game summary

Quarter	1	2	3	4	Total
**Lions**	3	14	3	6	**26**
Cardinals	7	6	10	0	**23**

at State Farm Stadium, Glendale, Arizona

- Date: September 27
- Game time: 1:25 p.m. MST
- Game weather: None (retractable roof closed)
- Game attendance: 0
- Referee: Scott Novak
- TV announcers (Fox): Dick Stockton, Brady Quinn and Sara Walsh
- Recap, Game Book

Game information

**First quarter**

- DET – Matt Prater 37-yard field goal, 8:27. Lions 3–0. **Drive: 11 plays, 56 yards, 6:33.**
- ARI – Andy Isabella 13-yard pass from Kyler Murray (Zane Gonzalez kick), 0:14. Cardinals 7–3. **Drive: 9 plays, 80 yards, 4:08.**

**Second quarter**

- DET – Jesse James 5-yard pass from Matthew Stafford (Matt Prater kick), 6:15. Lions 10–7. **Drive: 6 plays, 27 yards, 3:22.**
- ARI – Kyler Murray 1-yard run (Zane Gonzalez kick failed), 1:53. Cardinals 13–10. **Drive: 9 plays, 74 yards, 4:22.**
- DET – Kenny Golladay 15-yard pass from Matthew Stafford (Matt Prater kick), 0:31. Lions 17–13. **Drive: 6 plays, 75 yards, 1:02.**

**Third quarter**

- ARI – Zane Gonzalez 54-yard field goal, 11:19. Lions 17–16. **Drive: 7 plays, 39 yards, 3:41.**
- DET – Matt Prater 24-yard field goal, 5:27. Lions 20–16. **Drive: 6 plays, 16 yards, 2:09.**
- ARI – Andy Isabella 4-yard pass from Kyler Murray (Zane Gonzalez kick), 0:35. Cardinals 23–20. **Drive: 11 plays, 75 yards, 4:52.**

**Fourth quarter**

- DET – Matt Prater 35-yard field goal, 6:44. Tied 23–23. **Drive: 8 plays, 19 yards, 4:19.**
- DET – Matt Prater 39-yard field goal, 0:00. Lions 26–23. **Drive: 10 plays, 70 yards, 4:49.**

**Top passers**

- DET – Matthew Stafford – 22/31, 270 yards, 2 TD
- ARI – Kyler Murray – 23/35, 270 yards, 2 TD, 3 INT

**Top rushers**

- DET – Adrian Peterson – 22 rushes, 75 yards
- ARI – Kenyan Drake – 18 rushes, 73 yards

**Top receivers**

- DET – Kenny Golladay – 6 receptions, 57 yards, TD
- ARI – DeAndre Hopkins – 10 receptions, 137 yards

The Cardinals attempted to win their game over the Lions since 2015, but instead with the upset loss, the Cardinals fell to 2–1 for the first time since 2010.

==== Week 4: at Carolina Panthers ====
Week 4: Arizona Cardinals at Carolina Panthers – Game summary

Quarter	1	2	3	4	Total
Cardinals	0	7	7	7	**21**
**Panthers**	14	7	7	3	**31**

at Bank of America Stadium, Charlotte, North Carolina

- Date: October 4
- Game time: 1:00 p.m. EDT/10:00 a.m. MST
- Game weather: Mostly sunny, 68 °F (20 °C)
- Game attendance: 5,120
- Referee: Ronald Torbert
- TV announcers (Fox): Kevin Kugler, Chris Spielman and Laura Okmin
- Recap, Game Book

Game information

**First quarter**

- CAR – Mike Davis 1-yard run (Joey Slye kick), 7:21. Panthers 7–0. **Drive: 13 plays, 66 yards, 5:44.**
- CAR – Teddy Bridgewater 18-yard run (Joey Slye kick), 1:29. Panthers 14–0. **Drive: 9 plays, 80 yards, 4:31.**

**Second quarter**

- ARI – Jordan Thomas 3-yard pass from Kyler Murray (Zane Gonzalez kick), 7:26. Panthers 14–7. **Drive: 10 plays, 38 yards, 5:31.**
- CAR – Reggie Bonnafon 3-yard pass from Teddy Bridgewater (Joey Slye kick), 1:55. Panthers 21–7. **Drive: 10 plays, 75 yards, 5:31.**

**Third quarter**

- CAR – Ian Thomas 2-yard pass from Teddy Bridgewater (Joey Slye kick), 5:26. Panthers 28–7. **Drive: 8 plays, 74 yards, 4:19.**
- ARI – Christian Kirk 3-yard pass from Kyler Murray (Zane Gonzalez kick), 1:15. Panthers 28–14. **Drive: 7 plays, 75 yards, 4:11.**

**Fourth quarter**

- CAR – Joey Slye 27-yard field goal, 7:45. Panthers 31–14. **Drive: 15 plays, 73 yards, 8:30.**
- ARI – Chase Edmonds 2-yard pass from Kyler Murray (Zane Gonzalez kick), 2:13. Panthers 31–21. **Drive: 7 plays, 68 yards, 1:52.**

**Top passers**

- ARI – Kyler Murray – 24/31, 133 yards, 3 TD
- CAR – Teddy Bridgewater – 26/37, 276 yards, 2 TD, INT

**Top rushers**

- ARI – Kyler Murray – 6 rushes, 78 yards
- CAR – Mike Davis – 16 rushes, 84 yards, TD

**Top receivers**

- ARI – DeAndre Hopkins – 7 receptions, 41 yards
- CAR – Robby Anderson – 8 receptions, 99 yards

==== Week 5: at New York Jets ====
Week 5: Arizona Cardinals at New York Jets – Game summary

Quarter	1	2	3	4	Total
**Cardinals**	7	10	7	6	**30**
Jets	0	3	7	0	**10**

at MetLife Stadium, East Rutherford, New Jersey

- Date: October 11
- Game time: 1:00 p.m. EDT/10:00 a.m. MST
- Game weather: Cloudy, 64 °F (18 °C)
- Game attendance: 0
- Referee: Adrian Hill
- TV announcers (Fox): Kevin Kugler, Chris Spielman and Laura Okmin
- Recap, Game Book

Game information

**First quarter**

- ARI – Chase Edmonds 29-yard run (Zane Gonzalez kick), 7:33. Cardinals 7–0. **Drive: 8 plays, 89 yards, 3:13.**

**Second quarter**

- NYJ – Sam Ficken 26-yard field goal, 7:01. Cardinals 7–3. **Drive: 4 plays, 2 yards, 0:47.**
- ARI – Kyler Murray 2-yard run (Zane Gonzalez kick), 2:41. Cardinals 14–3. **Drive: 10 plays, 75 yards, 4:20.**
- ARI – Zane Gonzalez 47-yard field goal, 0:03. Cardinals 17–3. **Drive: 6 plays, 52 yards, 0:50.**

**Third quarter**

- NYJ – Jamison Crowder 11-yard pass from Joe Flacco (Sam Ficken kick), 5:51. Cardinals 17–10. **Drive: 6 plays, 74 yards, 2:12.**
- ARI – Kenyan Drake 1-yard run (Zane Gonzalez kick), 0:15. Cardinals 24–10. **Drive: 10 plays, 70 yards, 5:36.**

**Fourth quarter**

- ARI – DeAndre Hopkins 37-yard pass from Kyler Murray (pass failed), 8:35. Cardinals 30–10. **Drive: 6 plays, 96 yards, 2:42.**

**Top passers**

- ARI – Kyler Murray – 27/37, 380 yards, TD, INT
- NYJ – Joe Flacco – 18/33, 195 yards, TD

**Top rushers**

- ARI – Kenyan Drake – 18 rushes, 60 yards, TD
- NYJ – Le'Veon Bell – 13 rushes, 60 yards

**Top receivers**

- ARI – DeAndre Hopkins – 6 receptions, 131 yards, TD
- NYJ – Jamison Crowder – 8 receptions, 116 yards, TD

==== Week 6: at Dallas Cowboys ====
Week 6: Arizona Cardinals at Dallas Cowboys – Game summary

Quarter	1	2	3	4	Total
**Cardinals**	0	21	7	10	**38**
Cowboys	0	3	0	7	**10**

at AT&T Stadium, Arlington, Texas

- Date: October 19
- Game time: 7:15 p.m. CDT/5:15 p.m. MST
- Game weather: Clear, 64 °F (18 °C) (retractable roof open)
- Game attendance: 25,174
- Referee: Clete Blakeman
- TV announcers (ESPN): Steve Levy, Brian Griese, Louis Riddick, Lisa Salters and John Parry
- Recap, Game Book

Game information

**First quarter**

- No scoring plays.

**Second quarter**

- ARI – Christian Kirk 6-yard pass from Kyler Murray (Zane Gonzalez kick), 12:58. Cardinals 7–0. **Drive: 11 plays, 54 yards, 4:38.**
- ARI – Kenyan Drake 1-yard run (Zane Gonzalez kick), 10:31. Cardinals 14–0. **Drive: 5 plays, 27 yards, 1:39.**
- ARI – Christian Kirk 80-yard pass from Kyler Murray (Zane Gonzalez kick), 4:43. Cardinals 21–0. **Drive: 1 play, 80 yards, 0:10.**
- DAL – Greg Zuerlein 34-yard field goal, 0:10. Cardinals 21–3. **Drive: 14 plays, 50 yards, 4:33.**

**Third quarter**

- ARI – Kyler Murray 1-yard run (Zane Gonzalez kick), 7:53. Cardinals 28–3. **Drive: 9 plays, 79 yards, 4:32.**

**Fourth quarter**

- ARI – Zane Gonzalez 26-yard field goal, 8:54. Cardinals 31–3. **Drive: 9 plays, 82 yards, 4:24.**
- DAL – Amari Cooper 1-yard pass from Andy Dalton (Greg Zuerlein kick), 2:48. Cardinals 31–10. **Drive: 18 plays, 75 yards, 6:06.**
- ARI – Kenyan Drake 69-yard run (Zane Gonzalez kick), 1:49. Cardinals 38–10. **Drive: 3 plays, 75 yards, 0:59.**

**Top passers**

- ARI – Kyler Murray – 9/24, 188 yards, 2 TD
- DAL – Andy Dalton – 34/54, 266 yards, TD, 2 INT

**Top rushers**

- ARI – Kenyan Drake – 20 rushes, 164 yards, 2 TD
- DAL – Ezekiel Elliott – 12 rushes, 49 yards

**Top passers**

- ARI – Christian Kirk – 2 receptions, 86 yards, 2 TD
- DAL – Amari Cooper – 7 receptions, 79 yards, TD

With the win, the Cardinals not only advanced to 4–2, they also won their first road MNF game since 1977.

==== Week 7: vs. Seattle Seahawks ====
Week 7: Seattle Seahawks at Arizona Cardinals – Game summary

Quarter	1	2	3	4	OT	Total
Seahawks	10	17	0	7	0	**34**
**Cardinals**	7	10	7	10	3	**37**

at State Farm Stadium, Glendale, Arizona

- Date: October 25
- Game time: 5:20 p.m. MST
- Game weather: Mostly sunny, 84 °F (29 °C) (retractable roof open)
- Game attendance: 1,200
- Referee: John Hussey
- TV announcers (NBC): Al Michaels, Cris Collinsworth, Michele Tafoya and Terry McAulay
- Recap, Game Book

Game information

**First quarter**

- SEA – Tyler Lockett 3-yard pass from Russell Wilson (Jason Myers kick), 11:59. Seahawks 7–0. **Drive: 6 plays, 75 yards, 3:01.**
- SEA – Jason Myers 41-yard field goal, 6:35. Seahawks 10–0. **Drive: 9 plays, 43 yards, 3:51.**
- ARI – DeAndre Hopkins 35-yard pass from Kyler Murray (Zane Gonzalez kick), 2:39. Seahawks 10–7. **Drive: 9 plays, 75 yards, 3:56.**

**Second quarter**

- SEA – Jason Myers 44-yard field goal, 12:50. Seahawks 13–7. **Drive: 9 plays, 49 yards, 4:49.**
- SEA – Carlos Hyde 24-yard run (Jason Myers kick), 4:04. Seahawks 20–7. **Drive: 6 plays, 97 yards, 2:39.**
- ARI – Christian Kirk 7-yard pass from Kyler Murray (Zane Gonzalez kick), 1:14. Seahawks 20–14. **Drive: 6 plays, 75 yards, 2:50.**
- SEA – Tyler Lockett 47-yard pass from Russell Wilson (Jason Myers kick), 0:43. Seahawks 27–14. **Drive: 3 plays, 75 yards, 0:31.**
- ARI – Zane Gonzalez 49-yard field goal, 0:00. Seahawks 27–17. **Drive: 7 plays, 44 yards, 0:43.**

**Third quarter**

- ARI – Kyler Murray 5-yard run (Zane Gonzalez kick), 2:59. Seahawks 27–24. **Drive: 12 plays, 93 yards, 5:31.**

**Fourth quarter**

- SEA – Tyler Lockett 3-yard pass from Russell Wilson (Jason Myers kick), 6:44. Seahawks 34–24. **Drive: 12 plays, 45 yards, 5:26.**
- ARI – Christian Kirk 8-yard pass from Kyler Murray (Zane Gonzalez kick), 2:28. Seahawks 34–31. **Drive: 14 plays, 75 yards, 4:16.**
- ARI – Zane Gonzalez 44-yard field goal, 0:00. Tied 34–34. **Drive: 8 plays, 54 yards, 0:52.**

**Overtime**

- ARI – Zane Gonzalez 48-yard field goal, 0:15. Cardinals 37–34. **Drive: 6 plays, 19 yards, 0:42.**

**Top passers**

- SEA – Russell Wilson – 33/50, 388 yards, 3 TD, 3 INT
- ARI – Kyler Murray – 34/48, 360 yards, 3 TD, INT

**Top rushers**

- SEA – Russell Wilson – 6 rushes, 84 yards
- ARI – Kyler Murray – 14 rushes, 67 yards, TD

**Top receivers**

- SEA – Tyler Lockett – 15 receptions, 200 yards, 3 TD
- ARI – DeAndre Hopkins – 10 receptions, 103 yards, TD

This was the Cardinals' first Sunday Night Football appearance since 2016, which was also against the Seahawks at home. This was the Cardinals' first home win over the Seahawks since 2012.

==== Week 9: vs. Miami Dolphins ====
Week 9: Miami Dolphins at Arizona Cardinals – Game summary

Quarter	1	2	3	4	Total
**Dolphins**	14	10	0	10	**34**
Cardinals	7	10	14	0	**31**

at State Farm Stadium, Glendale, Arizona

- Date: November 8
- Game time: 2:25 p.m. MST
- Game weather: 66 °F (19 °C) (retractable roof open)
- Game attendance: 4,200
- Referee: Carl Cheffers
- TV announcers (CBS): Andrew Catalon, James Lofton and Michael Grady
- Recap, Game Book

Game information

**First quarter**

- MIA – Shaq Lawson 36-yard fumble return (Jason Sanders kick), 10:37. Dolphins 7–0.
- ARI – Maxx Williams 4-yard pass from Kyler Murray (Zane Gonzalez kick), 4:48. Tied 7–7. **Drive: 10 plays, 75 yards, 3:46.**
- MIA – Jordan Howard 2-yard run (Jason Sanders kick), 0:55. Dolphins 14–7. **Drive: 10 plays, 75 yards, 5:56.**

**Second quarter**

- ARI – Christian Kirk 56-yard pass from Kyler Murray (Zane Gonzalez kick), 14:23. Tied 14–14. **Drive: 4 plays, 75 yards, 1:32.**
- MIA – Preston Williams 9-yard pass from Tua Tagovailoa (Jason Sanders kick), 10:18. Dolphins 21–14. **Drive: 8 plays, 80 yards, 4:05.**
- ARI – Zane Gonzalez 37-yard field goal, 5:10. Dolphins 21–17. **Drive: 11 plays, 56 yards, 5:08.**
- MIA – Jason Sanders 56-yard field goal, 0:03. Dolphins 24–17. **Drive: 6 plays, 26 yards, 0:43.**

**Third quarter**

- ARI – Darrell Daniels 21-yard pass from Kyler Murray (Zane Gonzalez kick), 12:13. Tied 24–24. **Drive: 7 plays, 87 yards, 3:12.**
- ARI – Kyler Murray 12-yard run (Zane Gonzalez kick), 2:34. Cardinals 31–24. **Drive: 11 plays, 84 yards, 6:10.**

**Fourth quarter**

- MIA – Mack Hollins 11-yard pass from Tua Tagovailoa (Jason Sanders kick), 11:19. Tied 31–31. **Drive: 10 plays, 93 yards, 6:09.**
- MIA – Jason Sanders 50-yard field goal, 3:35. Dolphins 34–31. **Drive: 5 plays, 28 yards, 1:40.**

**Top passers**

- MIA – Tua Tagovailoa – 20/28, 248 yards, 2 TD
- ARI – Kyler Murray – 21/26, 283 yards, 3 TD

**Top rushers**

- MIA – Salvon Ahmed – 7 rushes, 38 yards
- ARI – Kyler Murray – 11 rushes, 106 yards, TD

**Top receivers**

- MIA – DeVante Parker – 6 receptions, 64 yards
- ARI – Christian Kirk – 5 receptions, 123 yards, TD

Cardinals kicker Zane Gonzalez missed a game-tying 49-yard field goal.

==== Week 10: vs. Buffalo Bills ====
Week 10: Buffalo Bills at Arizona Cardinals – Game summary

Quarter	1	2	3	4	Total
Bills	7	9	7	7	**30**
**Cardinals**	3	6	17	6	**32**

at State Farm Stadium, Glendale, Arizona

- Date: November 15
- Game time: 2:05 p.m. MST
- Game weather: Sunny, 78 °F (26 °C) (retractable roof open)
- Game attendance: 4,200
- Referee: Craig Wrolstad
- TV announcers (CBS): Ian Eagle, Charles Davis and Evan Washburn
- Recap, Game Book

Game information

**First quarter**

- ARI – Zane Gonzalez 23-yard field goal, 9:53. Cardinals 3–0. **Drive: 13 plays, 75 yards, 5:07.**
- BUF – Josh Allen 12-yard pass from Isaiah McKenzie (Tyler Bass kick), 6:23. Bills 7–3. **Drive: 7 plays, 63 yards, 3:30.**

**Second quarter**

- BUF – Tyler Bass 54-yard field goal, 14:02. Bills 10–3. **Drive: 10 plays, 31 yards, 5:21.**
- ARI – Zane Gonzalez 42-yard field goal, 8:45. Bills 10–6. **Drive: 10 plays, 51 yards, 5:17.**
- BUF – Tyler Bass 55-yard field goal, 5:45. Bills 13–6. **Drive: 8 plays, 33 yards, 3:00.**
- ARI – Zane Gonzalez 21-yard field goal, 1:24. Bills 13–9. **Drive: 16 plays, 72 yards, 4:21.**
- BUF – Tyler Bass 58-yard field goal, 0:00. Bills 16–9. **Drive: 7 plays, 34 yards, 1:24.**

**Third quarter**

- BUF – Cole Beasley 22-yard pass from Josh Allen (Tyler Bass kick), 9:52. Bills 23–9. **Drive: 3 plays, 37 yards, 1:35.**
- ARI – Kyler Murray 1-yard run (Zane Gonzalez kick), 5:44. Bills 23–16. **Drive: 9 plays, 75 yards, 4:08.**
- ARI – Zane Gonzalez 45-yard field goal, 3:05. Bills 23–19. **Drive: 4 plays, 3 yards, 1:30.**
- ARI – Kyler Murray 15-yard run (Zane Gonzalez kick), 0:08. Cardinals 26–23. **Drive: 3 plays, 56 yards, 1:05.**

**Fourth quarter**

- BUF – Stefon Diggs 21-yard pass from Josh Allen (Tyler Bass kick), 0:34. Bills 30–26. **Drive: 12 plays, 78 yards, 3:01.**
- ARI – DeAndre Hopkins 43-yard pass from Kyler Murray (run failed), 0:02. Cardinals 32–30. **Drive: 4 plays, 75 yards, 0:32.**

**Top passers**

- BUF – Josh Allen – 32/49, 284 yards, 2 TD, 2 INT
- ARI – Kyler Murray – 22/32, 245 yards, TD, INT

**Top rushers**

- BUF – Josh Allen – 7 rushes, 38 yards
- ARI – Kenyan Drake – 16 rushes, 100 yards

**Top receivers**

- BUF – Cole Beasley – 11 receptions, 109 yards, TD
- ARI – DeAndre Hopkins – 7 receptions, 127 yards, TD

In the final seconds of game, Kyler Murray threw a game winning touchdown pass to wide receiver DeAndre Hopkins with two seconds left after he leaped over three defenders in the end zone to make the catch. The play came at the end of a game in which the Cardinals rallied from a 23–9 deficit early in the third quarter, and from a 30–26 deficit after Bills quarterback Josh Allen threw a touchdown pass to wide receiver Stefon Diggs with less than 40 seconds left.

With the win, the Cardinals improved to 6–3. This was the first time a successful game-winning Hail Mary catch in the fourth quarter was made since Aaron Rodgers threw one in a 2015 game against the Detroit Lions.

==== Week 11: at Seattle Seahawks ====
Week 11: Arizona Cardinals at Seattle Seahawks – Game summary

Quarter	1	2	3	4	Total
Cardinals	0	7	7	7	**21**
**Seahawks**	7	9	7	5	**28**

at Lumen Field, Seattle, Washington

- Date: November 19
- Game time: 6:20 p.m. MST/5:20 p.m. PST
- Game weather: Partly Cloudy, 48 °F (9 °C)
- Game attendance: 0
- Referee: Tony Corrente
- TV announcers (Fox/NFLN/Amazon Prime): Joe Buck, Troy Aikman, Erin Andrews and Kristina Pink
- Recap, Game Book

Game information

**First quarter**

- SEA – DK Metcalf 25-yard pass from Russell Wilson (Jason Myers kick), 8:45. Seahawks 7–0. **Drive: 12 plays, 75 yards, 6:15.**

**Second quarter**

- ARI – Kenyan Drake 2-yard run (Zane Gonzalez kick), 13:51. Tied 7–7. **Drive: 8 plays, 50 yards, 2:52.**
- SEA – Tyler Lockett 11-yard pass from Russell Wilson (kick failed), 8:27. Seahawks 13–7. **Drive: 10 plays, 75 yards, 5:24.**
- SEA – Jason Myers 27-yard field goal, 0:00. Seahawks 16–7. **Drive: 7 plays, 78 yards, 1:17.**

**Third quarter**

- ARI – Dan Arnold 4-yard pass from Kyler Murray (Zane Gonzalez kick), 10:07. Seahawks 16–14. **Drive: 11 plays, 81 yards, 4:53.**
- SEA – Carlos Hyde 2-yard run (Jason Myers kick), 5:20. Seahawks 23–14. **Drive: 8 plays, 72 yards, 4:47.**

**Fourth quarter**

- ARI – Chase Edmonds 3-yard pass from Kyler Murray (Zane Gonzalez kick), 13:19. Seahawks 23–21. **Drive: 15 plays, 90 yards, 7:01.**
- SEA – Penalty on J. R. Sweezy enforced in end zone for a safety, 9:12. Seahawks 25–21.
- SEA – Jason Myers 41-yard field goal, 2:19. Seahawks 28–21. **Drive: 12 plays, 37 yards, 6:53.**

**Top passers**

- ARI – Kyler Murray – 29/42, 269 yards, 2 TD
- SEA – Russell Wilson – 23/28, 197 yards, 2 TD

**Top rushers**

- ARI – Kenyan Drake – 11 rushes, 29 yards, TD
- SEA – Carlos Hyde – 14 rushes, 79 yards, TD

**Top receivers**

- ARI – Larry Fitzgerald – 8 receptions, 62 yards
- SEA – Tyler Lockett – 9 receptions, 67 yards, TD

==== Week 12: at New England Patriots ====
Week 12: Arizona Cardinals at New England Patriots – Game summary

Quarter	1	2	3	4	Total
Cardinals	10	0	0	7	**17**
**Patriots**	0	7	10	3	**20**

at Gillette Stadium, Foxborough, Massachusetts

- Date: November 29
- Game time: 1:00 p.m. EST/11:00 a.m. MST
- Game weather: Sunny, 52 °F (11 °C)
- Game attendance: 0
- Referee: Bill Vinovich
- TV announcers (Fox): Kevin Burkhardt, Daryl Johnston and Pam Oliver
- Recap, Game Book

Game information

**First quarter**

- ARI – Kenyan Drake 1-yard run (Zane Gonzalez kick), 12:09. Cardinals 7–0. **Drive: 2 plays, 23 yards, 1:29.**
- ARI – Zane Gonzalez 47-yard field goal, 1:49. Cardinals 10–0. **Drive: 12 plays, 68 yards, 5:24.**

**Second quarter**

- NE – James White 7-yard run (Nick Folk kick), 14:15. Cardinals 10–7. **Drive: 7 plays, 46 yards, 2:34.**

**Third quarter**

- NE – Nick Folk 22-yard field goal, 7:46. Tied 10–10. **Drive: 8 plays, 35 yards, 3:57.**
- NE – James White 1-yard run (Nick Folk kick), 3:30. Patriots 17–10. **Drive: 6 plays, 31 yards, 2:51.**

**Fourth quarter**

- ARI – Kenyan Drake 1-yard run (Zane Gonzalez kick), 8:02. Tied 17–17. **Drive: 16 plays, 80 yards, 7:19.**
- NE – Nick Folk 50-yard field goal, 0:00. Patriots 20–17. **Drive: 7 plays, 33 yards, 1:47.**

**Top passers**

- ARI – Kyler Murray – 23/34, 170 yards, INT
- NE – Cam Newton – 9/18, 84 yards, 2 INT

**Top rushers**

- ARI – Kenyan Drake – 22 rushes, 78 yards, 2 TD
- NE – Damien Harris – 14 rushes, 47 yards

**Top receivers**

- ARI – DeAndre Hopkins – 5 receptions, 55 yards
- NE – Jakobi Meyers – 5 receptions, 52 yards

==== Week 13: vs. Los Angeles Rams ====
Week 13: Los Angeles Rams at Arizona Cardinals – Game summary

Quarter	1	2	3	4	Total
**Rams**	0	14	3	21	**38**
Cardinals	7	0	7	14	**28**

at State Farm Stadium, Glendale, Arizona

- Date: December 6
- Game time: 2:05 p.m. MST
- Game weather: Sunny, 71 °F (22 °C) (retractable roof open)
- Game attendance: 0
- Referee: Jerome Boger
- TV announcers (Fox): Chris Myers, Brock Huard and Greg Jennings
- Recap, Game Book

Game information

**First quarter**

- ARI – Dan Arnold 59-yard pass from Kyler Murray (Zane Gonzalez kick), 13:25. Cardinals 7–0. **Drive: 4 plays, 75 yards, 1:35.**

**Second quarter**

- LAR – Cam Akers 9-yard run (Matt Gay kick), 10:35. Tied 7–7. **Drive: 14 plays, 85 yards, 7:12.**
- LAR – Tyler Higbee 1-yard pass from Jared Goff (Matt Gay kick), 0:51. Rams 14–7. **Drive: 9 plays, 45 yards, 3:27.**

**Third quarter**

- LAR – Matt Gay 39-yard field goal, 10:26. Rams 17–7. **Drive: 8 plays, 54 yards, 3:27.**
- ARI – DeAndre Hopkins 4-yard pass from Kyler Murray (Zane Gonzalez kick), 4:03. Rams 17–14. **Drive: 15 plays, 75 yards, 6:23.**

**Fourth quarter**

- LAR – Jared Goff 1-yard run (Matt Gay kick), 14:52. Rams 24–14. **Drive: 9 plays, 75 yards, 4:11.**
- ARI – Kenyan Drake 4-yard run (Zane Gonzalez kick), 13:21. Rams 24–21. **Drive: 2 plays, 15 yards, 0:25.**
- LAR – Darrell Henderson 38-yard run (Matt Gay kick), 10:07. Rams 31–21. **Drive: 7 plays, 76 yards, 3:14.**
- LAR – Troy Hill 35-yard interception return (Matt Gay kick), 4:33. Rams 38–21.
- ARI – Dan Arnold 2-yard pass from Kyler Murray (Zane Gonzalez kick), 2:04. Rams 38–28. **Drive: 8 plays, 47 yards, 2:29.**

**Top passers**

- LAR – Jared Goff – 37/47, 351 yards, TD
- ARI – Kyler Murray – 21/39, 173 yards, 3 TD, INT

**Top rushers**

- LAR – Cam Akers – 21 rushes, 72 yards, TD
- ARI – Kenyan Drake – 10 rushes, 49 yards, TD

**Top receivers**

- LAR – Robert Woods – 10 receptions, 85 yards
- ARI – DeAndre Hopkins – 8 receptions, 52 yards, TD

==== Week 14: at New York Giants ====
Week 14: Arizona Cardinals at New York Giants – Game summary

Quarter	1	2	3	4	Total
**Cardinals**	3	10	7	6	**26**
Giants	0	0	7	0	**7**

at MetLife Stadium, East Rutherford, New Jersey

- Date: December 13
- Game time: 1:00 p.m. EST/11:00 a.m. MST
- Game weather: Fair, 59 °F (15 °C)
- Game attendance: 0
- Referee: Ronald Torbert
- TV announcers (Fox): Kenny Albert, Jonathan Vilma and Shannon Spake
- Recap, Game Book

Game information

**First quarter**

- ARI – Mike Nugent 34-yard field goal, 6:30. Cardinals 3–0. **Drive: 6 plays, 22 yards, 2:33.**

**Second quarter**

- ARI – Mike Nugent 37-yard field goal, 8:24. Cardinals 6–0. **Drive: 11 plays, 34 yards, 5:35.**
- ARI – Dan Arnold 7-yard pass from Kyler Murray (Mike Nugent kick), 6:53. Cardinals 13–0. **Drive: 4 plays, 21 yards, 1:24.**

**Third quarter**

- ARI – Kenyan Drake 1-yard run (Mike Nugent kick), 8:52. Cardinals 20–0. **Drive: 11 plays, 77 yards, 6:08.**
- NYG – Dion Lewis 1-yard run (Graham Gano kick), 5:38. Cardinals 20–7. **Drive: 7 plays, 75 yards, 3:14.**

**Fourth quarter**

- ARI – Mike Nugent 34-yard field goal, 12:38. Cardinals 23–7. **Drive: 8 plays, 34 yards, 3:01.**
- ARI – Mike Nugent 30-yard field goal, 2:41. Cardinals 26–7. **Drive: 7 plays, 21 yards, 2:36.**

**Top passers**

- ARI – Kyler Murray – 24/35, 244 yards, TD
- NYG – Daniel Jones – 11/21, 127 yards

**Top rushers**

- ARI – Kenyan Drake – 23 rushes, 80 yards, TD
- NYG – Wayne Gallman – 12 rushes, 57 yards

**Top receivers**

- ARI – DeAndre Hopkins – 9 receptions, 136 yards
- NYG – Golden Tate – 1 reception, 39 yards

==== Week 15: vs. Philadelphia Eagles ====
Week 15: Philadelphia Eagles at Arizona Cardinals – Game summary

Quarter	1	2	3	4	Total
Eagles	0	20	6	0	**26**
**Cardinals**	16	10	0	7	**33**

at State Farm Stadium, Glendale, Arizona

- Date: December 20
- Game time: 2:05 p.m. MST
- Game weather: Sunny, 66 °F (19 °C) (retractable roof open)
- Game attendance: 0
- Referee: Craig Wrolstad
- TV announcers (Fox): Brandon Gaudin, Aqib Talib and Sara Walsh
- Recap, Game Book

Game information

**First quarter**

- ARI – Penalty on Jalen Hurts enforced in end zone for a Safety, 9:34. Cardinals 2–0.
- ARI – Kyler Murray 8-yard run (Mike Nugent kick), 5:46. Cardinals 9–0. **Drive: 3 plays, 66 yards, 0:57.**
- ARI – Chase Edmonds 6-yard pass from Kyler Murray (Mike Nugent kick), 2:18. Cardinals 16–0. **Drive: 2 plays, 6 yards, 0:08.**

**Second quarter**

- PHI – Quez Watkins 32-yard pass from Jalen Hurts (Jake Elliott kick), 14:01. Cardinals 16–7. **Drive: 7 plays, 74 yards, 3:17.**
- ARI – Mike Nugent 40-yard field goal, 11:37. Cardinals 19–7. **Drive: 5 plays, 53 yards, 2:24.**
- PHI – Greg Ward 4-yard pass from Jalen Hurts (Jake Elliott kick), 6:20. Cardinals 19–14. **Drive: 5 plays, 21 yards, 2:15.**
- ARI – Larry Fitzgerald 14-yard pass from Kyler Murray (Mike Nugent kick), 2:13. Cardinals 26–14. **Drive: 8 plays, 75 yards, 4:07.**
- PHI – Greg Ward 5-yard pass from Jalen Hurts (run failed), 1:19. Cardinals 26–20. **Drive: 7 plays, 78 yards, 0:54.**

**Third quarter**

- PHI – Jalen Hurts 7-yard run (run failed), 0:55. Tied 26–26. **Drive: 9 plays, 80 yards, 4:41.**

**Fourth quarter**

- ARI – DeAndre Hopkins 20-yard pass from Kyler Murray (Mike Nugent kick), 7:17. Cardinals 33–26. **Drive: 7 plays, 86 yards, 3:14.**

**Top passers**

- PHI – Jalen Hurts – 24/44, 338 yards, 3 TD
- ARI – Kyler Murray – 27/36, 406 yards, 3 TD, INT

**Top rushers**

- PHI – Miles Sanders – 17 rushes, 64 yards
- ARI – Chase Edmonds – 11 rushes, 47 yards

**Top receivers**

- PHI – Zach Ertz – 2 receptions, 69 yards
- ARI – DeAndre Hopkins – 9 receptions, 169 yards, TD

==== Week 16: vs. San Francisco 49ers ====
Week 16: San Francisco 49ers at Arizona Cardinals – Game summary

Quarter	1	2	3	4	Total
**49ers**	7	0	7	6	**20**
Cardinals	3	3	0	6	**12**

at State Farm Stadium, Glendale, Arizona

- Date: December 26
- Game time: 2:30 p.m. MST
- Game weather: Mostly sunny, 69 °F (21 °C) (retractable roof open)
- Game attendance: 0
- Referee: Clete Blakeman
- TV announcers (Prime Video/Twitch): Andrew Catalon, James Lofton and Sherree Burruss
- Recap, Game Book

Game information

**First quarter**

- ARI – Mike Nugent 27-yard field goal, 10:10. Cardinals 3–0. **Drive: 11 plays, 74 yards, 4:50.**
- SF – Jeff Wilson 21-yard pass from C. J. Beathard (Robbie Gould kick), 2:44. 49ers 7–3. **Drive: 7 plays, 74 yards, 4:12.**

**Second quarter**

- ARI – Mike Nugent 43-yard field goal, 0:39. 49ers 7–6. **Drive: 10 plays, 34 yards, 2:35.**

**Third quarter**

- SF – Kyle Juszczyk 9-yard pass from C. J. Beathard (Robbie Gould kick), 5:13. 49ers 14–6. **Drive: 7 plays, 71 yards, 4:03.**

**Fourth quarter**

- ARI – Kenyan Drake 1-yard run (pass failed), 12:08. 49ers 14–12. **Drive: 14 plays, 87 yards, 6:55.**
- SF – Kyle Juszczyk 1-yard pass from C. J. Beathard (kick failed), 8:36. 49ers 20–12. **Drive: 2 plays, 35 yards, 0:24.**

**Top passers**

- SF – C. J. Beathard – 13/22, 182 yards, 3 TD
- ARI – Kyler Murray – 31/50, 247 yards, INT

**Top rushers**

- SF – Jeff Wilson – 22 rushes, 183 yards
- ARI – Kyler Murray – 8 rushes, 75 yards

**Top receivers**

- SF – George Kittle – 4 receptions, 92 yards
- ARI – Christian Kirk – 7 receptions, 76 yards

==== Week 17: at Los Angeles Rams ====
Week 17: Arizona Cardinals at Los Angeles Rams – Game summary

Quarter	1	2	3	4	Total
Cardinals	7	0	0	0	**7**
**Rams**	0	12	3	3	**18**

at SoFi Stadium, Inglewood, California

- Date: January 3, 2021
- Game time: 2:25 p.m. MST/1:25 p.m. PST
- Game weather: Cloudy, 59 °F (15 °C)
- Game attendance: 0
- Referee: Carl Cheffers
- TV announcers (CBS): Jim Nantz, Boomer Esiason, Tracy Wolfson and Gene Steratore
- Recap, Game Book

Game information

**First quarter**

- ARI – Jonathan Ward 11-yard pass from Chris Streveler (Mike Nugent kick), 10:09. Cardinals 7–0. **Drive: 2 plays, 14 yards, 0:39.**

**Second quarter**

- LAR – Matt Gay 28-yard field goal, 14:17. Cardinals 7–3. **Drive: 16 plays, 69 yards, 7:44.**
- LAR – Justin Pugh penalty enforced in end zone for a safety, 5:31. Cardinals 7–5.
- LAR – Troy Hill 84-yard interception return (Matt Gay kick), 0:20. Rams 12–7.

**Third quarter**

- LAR – Matt Gay 34-yard field goal, 6:16. Rams 15–7. **Drive: 13 plays, 59 yards, 8:44.**

**Fourth quarter**

- LAR – Matt Gay 27-yard field goal, 14:25. Rams 18–7. **Drive: 11 plays, 71 yards, 3:46.**

**Top passers**

- ARI – Chris Streveler – 11/16, 105 yards, TD, INT
- LAR – John Wolford – 22/38, 231 yards, INT

**Top rushers**

- ARI – Kenyan Drake – 10 rushes, 36 yards
- LAR – John Wolford – 6 rushes, 56 yards

**Top receivers**

- ARI – Dan Arnold – 3 receptions, 46 yards
- LAR – Cam Akers – 4 receptions, 52 yards

With the loss, the Cardinals went 3–6 in their last 9 games after starting 5–2.

=== Standings ===
==== Division ====
NFC West
	W	L	T	PCT	DIV	CONF	PF	PA	STK
^{(3)} Seattle Seahawks	12	4	0	.750	4–2	9–3	459	371	W4
^{(6)} Los Angeles Rams	10	6	0	.625	3–3	9–3	372	296	W1
Arizona Cardinals	8	8	0	.500	2–4	6–6	410	367	L2
San Francisco 49ers	6	10	0	.375	3–3	4–8	376	390	L1

==== Conference ====
NFC
#	Team	Division	W	L	T	PCT	DIV	CONF	SOS	SOV	STK
**Division leaders**
1	Green Bay Packers	North	13	3	0	.813	5–1	10–2	.428	.387	W6
2 (Note: New Orleans finished ahead of Seattle based on conference record.)	New Orleans Saints	South	12	4	0	.750	6–0	10–2	.459	.406	W2
3	Seattle Seahawks	West	12	4	0	.750	4–2	9–3	.447	.404	W4
4	Washington Football Team	East	7	9	0	.438	4–2	5–7	.459	.388	W1
**Wild cards**
5	Tampa Bay Buccaneers	South	11	5	0	.688	4–2	8–4	.488	.392	W4
6	Los Angeles Rams	West	10	6	0	.625	3–3	9–3	.494	.484	W1
7 (Note: Chicago finished and clinched the 7th and final playoff spot ahead of Arizona based on better win percentage in common games (against Detroit, the NY Giants, Carolina, and the LA Rams, Chicago finished 3–2, while Arizona finished 1–4).)	Chicago Bears	North	8	8	0	.500	2–4	6–6	.488	.336	L1
**Did not qualify for the postseason**
8	Arizona Cardinals	West	8	8	0	.500	2–4	6–6	.475	.441	L2
9	Minnesota Vikings	North	7	9	0	.438	4–2	5–7	.504	.366	W1
10 (Note: San Francisco finished ahead of the NY Giants based on head-to-head victory. Division tie break was initially used to eliminate Dallas (see below).)	San Francisco 49ers	West	6	10	0	.375	3–3	4–8	.549	.448	L1
11 (Note: NY Giants won tiebreaker over Dallas based on division record.)	New York Giants	East	6	10	0	.375	4–2	5–7	.502	.427	W1
12	Dallas Cowboys	East	6	10	0	.375	2–4	5–7	.471	.333	L1
13 (Note: Carolina finished ahead of Detroit based on head-to-head victory.)	Carolina Panthers	South	5	11	0	.313	1–5	4–8	.531	.388	L1
14	Detroit Lions	North	5	11	0	.313	1–5	4–8	.508	.350	L4
15	Philadelphia Eagles	East	4	11	1	.281	2–4	4–8	.537	.469	L3
16	Atlanta Falcons	South	4	12	0	.250	1–5	2–10	.551	.391	L5
**Tiebreakers** (Note: When breaking ties for three or more teams under the NFL's rules, they are first broken within divisions, then comparing only the highest-ranked remaining team from each division.)

== Statistics ==
=== Starters ===
Offense

Pos.	Name	GS
QB	Kyler Murray	16
RB	Kenyan Drake; Chase Edmonds	14; 2
WR1	Larry Fitzgerald; Andy Isabella; Trent Sherfield	13; 2; 1
WR2	DeAndre Hopkins	16
WR3	Christian Kirk; KeeSean Johnson	14; 2
TE	Maxx Williams; Darrell Daniels	8; 8
LT	D.J. Humphries	16
LG	Justin Pugh; Justin Murray	15; 1
C	Mason Cole; Lamont Gaillard	14; 2
RG	J.R. Sweezy; Justin Murray	10; 6
RT	Kelvin Beachum	16

Defense

Pos.	Name	GS
DE	Zach Allen; Josh Mauro	13; 3
NT	Corey Peters; Trevon Coley; Domata Peko	9; 3; 4
DE	Jordan Phillips; Angelo Blackson	9; 7
OLB	Chandler Jones; Haason Reddick	5; 11
ILB	De'Vondre Campbell	16
ILB	Jordan Hicks	16
OLB	Devon Kennard; Haason Reddick; Isaiah Simmons; Markus Golden	5; 2; 1; 8
CB	Patrick Peterson	16
SS	Jalen Thompson; Chris Banjo; Deionte Thompson	5; 7; 4
FS	Budda Baker; Deionte Thompson	15; 1
CB	Dre Kirkpatrick; Byron Murphy; Kevin Peterson	14; 1; 1

Special Teams

Pos.	Name	GS
P	Andy Lee	16
K	Zane Gonzalez; Mike Nugent	12; 4
LS	Aaron Brewer	16

=== Individual leaders ===
Category	Player(s)	Value
Passing yards	Kyler Murray	3,971
Passing touchdowns	Kyler Murray	26
Rushing yards	Kenyan Drake	955
Rushing touchdowns	Kyler Murray	15
Receptions	DeAndre Hopkins	115
Receiving yards	DeAndre Hopkins	1,407
Receiving touchdowns	DeAndre Hopkins; Christian Kirk	8
Kickoff return yards	Chase Edmonds	417
Punt return yards	Christian Kirk	132
Tackles	Jordan Hicks; Budda Baker	118
Sacks	Haason Reddick	12.5
Forced fumbles	Haason Reddick	6
Interceptions	Patrick Peterson; Dre Kirkpatrick	3
Kicking - field goals	Zane Gonzalez	16/22, 72.7%
Kicking - extra points	Mike Nugent	7/7, 100%

=== Team rankings ===
Category	Value	NFL rank (out of 32)
Passing attempts	575	
Passing completions	387	15th
Passing yards	3,916	17th
Passing touchdowns	27	13th
Interceptions thrown	13	17th
Rushing attempts	479	6th
Rushing yards	2,237	7th
Rushing touchdowns	22	4th
Rushing yards/attempt	4.7	9th
Total yards of offense	6,153	6th
Points scored	410	13th
Points allowed	367	12th
Passing yards allowed	3,623	10th
Passing touchdowns allowed	26	14th
Rushing attempts against	436	21st
Rushing yards allowed	2,008	22nd
Rushing touchdowns allowed	13	7th
Yards/rush attempt allowed	4.6	25th
Interceptions made	11	18th
Fumbles recovered	10	8th
Total yards allowed	5,631	13th

Statistics correct as of the end of the 2020 NFL season
