= Malcolm Rodriguez =

American football player (born 1999)

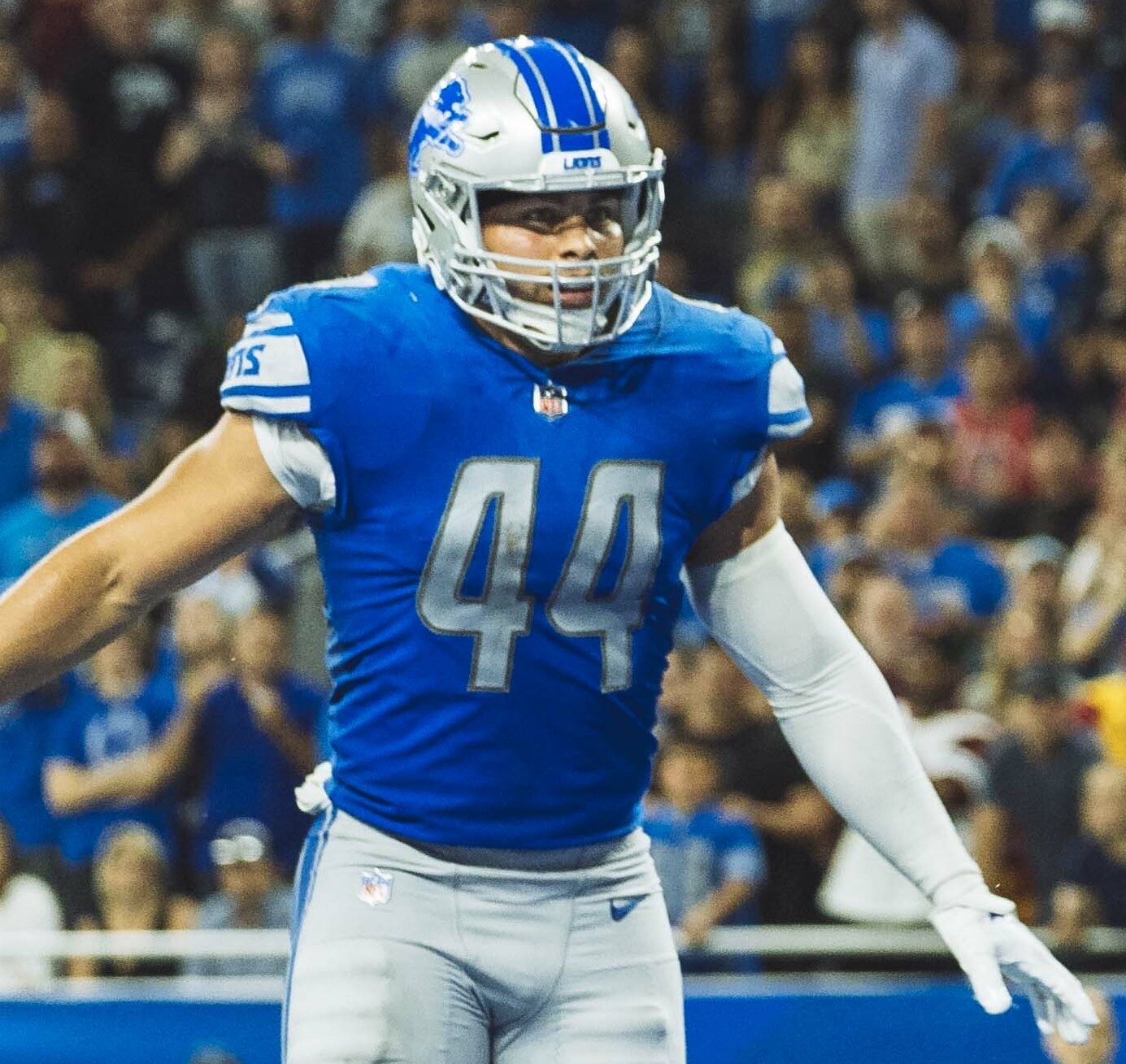
- Rodriguez with the Detroit Lions in 2022

No. 44 – Detroit Lions
- Position: Linebacker
- Roster status: Active

Personal information
- Born: March 29, 1999 (age 27); Tahlequah, Oklahoma, U.S.
- Listed height: 5 ft 11 in (1.80 m)
- Listed weight: 230 lb (104 kg)

Career information
- High school: Wagoner (Wagoner, Oklahoma)
- College: Oklahoma State (2017–2021)
- NFL draft: 2022: 6th round, 188th overall pick

Career history
- Detroit Lions (2022–present)

Awards and highlights
- PFWA All-Rookie Team (2022); First-team All-American (2021); First-team All-Big 12 (2021); 2× Second-team All-Big 12 (2019, 2020)

Career NFL statistics as of 2025
- Total tackles: 163
- Sacks: 3
- Forced fumbles: 2
- Fumble recoveries: 2
- Pass deflections: 3
- Stats at Pro Football Reference

Malcolm Luciano Rodriguez (born March 29, 1999) is an American professional football linebacker for the Detroit Lions of the National Football League (NFL). He played college football for the Oklahoma State Cowboys.

== Early life ==
Rodriguez attended Wagoner High School in Wagoner, Oklahoma. He played quarterback and safety in high school. During his career he had 115 touchdowns with 6,144 passing yards and 2,449 rushing yards. He was born to a Mexican father and Cherokee mother, he is a citizen of the Cherokee Nation.

== College career ==
Rodriguez joined Oklahoma State in 2017 and played there until 2021. After starting his career as a safety he moved to linebacker in 2019. As a senior he was named a first-team All-American by ESPN. During his career, he had 408 tackles, 7.5 sacks, two interceptions, and a touchdown. In his final college game, he was named the MVP of the 2022 Fiesta Bowl.

== Professional career ==
Pre-draft measurables
Height	Weight	Arm length	Hand span	Wingspan	40-yard dash	10-yard split	20-yard split	20-yard shuttle	Three-cone drill	Vertical jump	Broad jump	Bench press
5 ft 11 in (1.80 m)	232 lb (105 kg)	30 1/8 in (0.77 m)	9 5/8 in (0.24 m)	6 ft 1 1/8 in (1.86 m)	4.52 s	1.52 s	2.62 s	4.13 s	7.02 s	39.5 in (1.00 m)	10 ft 0 in (3.05 m)	36 reps
All values from NFL Combine/Pro Day

Rodriguez was selected by the Detroit Lions with the 188th pick in the sixth round of the 2022 NFL draft. As a rookie, he appeared in 16 games and started 15. He finished with one sack, 87 total tackles, two passes defended, and one forced fumble. He was named to the Pro Football Writers Association All-Rookie Team. In the 2023 season, he appeared in 17 games and started three.

Rodriguez made 10 appearances (6 starts) for Detroit in 2024, recording 43 combined tackles, two sacks, one pass deflection, and one fumble recovery. On November 29, 2024, it was announced that Rodriguez would miss the remainder of the season after he suffered a torn ACL in Week 13 against the Chicago Bears.

On November 18, 2025, Rodriguez was activated for his return from surgery ahead of Detroit's Week 12 matchup against the New York Giants.

On March 16, 2026, Rodriguez re-signed with the Lions on a one-year, $2.75 million contract.

== NFL career statistics ==
Legend
**Bold**	Career high

=== Regular season ===
Year	Team	Games		Tackles					Fumbles				Interceptions			
Year	Team	GP	GS	Cmb	Solo	Ast	Sck	TFL	FF	FR	Yds	TD	Int	Yds	TD	PD
2022	DET	16	15	**87**	**62**	**25**	1.0	**8**	**1**	**1**	**2**	0	0	0	0	**2**
2023	DET	17	3	21	13	8	0	0	**1**	0	0	0	0	0	0	0
2024	DET	10	6	43	27	16	**2.0**	2	0	**1**	0	0	0	0	0	1
2025	DET	7	1	12	9	3	0	1	0	0	0	0	0	0	0	0
Career		50	25	163	111	52	3.0	11	2	2	2	0	0	0	0	3
