= Hail Murray =

2020 Hail Mary play in American football

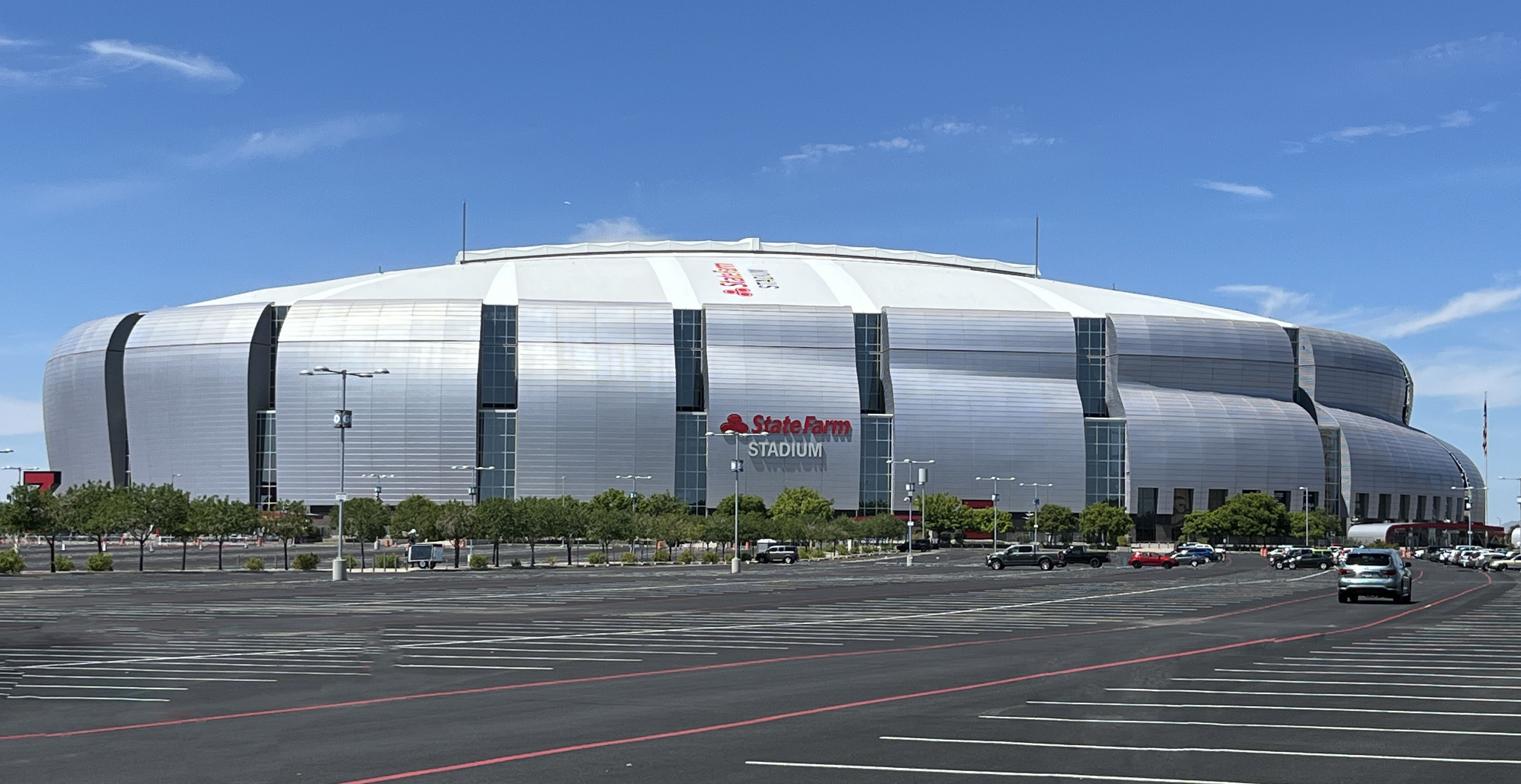
- The game was played at State Farm Stadium in Glendale, Arizona.
Buffalo Bills (7–2)	Arizona Cardinals (5–3)
30	32
Head coach: Sean McDermott	Head coach: Kliff Kingsbury
	1	2	3	4	Total
BUF	7	9	7	7	30
ARI	3	6	17	6	32
- Date: November 15, 2020
- Stadium: State Farm Stadium; Glendale, Arizona
- Favorite: Cardinals by 2.5
- Referee: Craig Wrolstad
- Attendance: 4,200

TV in the United States
- Network: CBS
- Announcers: Ian Eagle, Charles Davis, and Evan Washburn

The Hail Murray was a play during an American football game between the Buffalo Bills and Arizona Cardinals of the National Football League (NFL) on November 15, 2020. The game took place at State Farm Stadium in Glendale, Arizona. With eleven seconds remaining in regulation play, Cardinals quarterback Kyler Murray threw a 43-yard Hail Mary pass into the end zone that wide receiver DeAndre Hopkins caught over three Bills defenders for the game-winning touchdown with one second remaining on the clock.

The touchdown completed a 32–30 comeback victory for Arizona, which had trailed Buffalo 23–9 in the third quarter and had allowed the Bills to score a go-ahead touchdown some 30 seconds earlier. Media outlets dubbed the play "Hail Murray," a play on "Hail Mary" and Kyler Murray's last name. The play, which was the first go-ahead Hail Mary in a regular-season fourth quarter since the 2015 Miracle in Motown, was declared the NFL Play of the Year for the 2020 season.

== Background ==
Coming into the game, Arizona was 5–3 and in second place in the tightly contested NFC West. Meanwhile, Buffalo was first in the AFC East at 7–2, their closest competition being the then 5–3 Miami Dolphins. The Cardinals came into the game as 2.5-point favorites.

The Bills led the game 23–9 at one point in the third quarter, but allowed Arizona to score two touchdowns and kick a field goal to make the score 26–23. With 0:34 remaining in the fourth quarter, quarterback Josh Allen threw a 21-yard go-ahead touchdown pass to wide receiver Stefon Diggs to regain the lead for Buffalo. The ensuing kickoff resulted in a touchback, setting up the Cardinals at their own 25-yard line.

== The play ==
Despite Buffalo's prevent defense strategy, the Cardinals advanced to the Bills' 43-yard line for a 1st and 10 following a nine-yard reception by wide receiver Larry Fitzgerald. After a Buffalo timeout, Arizona lined up in trips right formation for the snap with 0:11 left in regulation.

After the snap, Cardinals receiver DeAndre Hopkins, by himself on the left side of the field, ran a go route towards the end zone while the other receivers, including Fitzgerald and Andy Isabella, ran varying levels of crossing routes. Murray took the snap and rolled to his left, evading a potential sack by Bills defensive end Mario Addison. As he was attempting to scramble forward, Bills defensive linemen Ed Oliver and Quinton Jefferson ran towards Murray in an attempt to tackle him. Murray's first read, Isabella, was not open on the play. As Sporting News and NFL Films noted, the play was not drawn up as a traditional Hail Mary due to Murray's receivers running crossing routes rather than all running straight to the end zone, but became one as Murray was forced into his desperation heave.

With no other choice, Murray threw the ball towards the end zone, as Oliver attempted to deflect the pass. The ball traveled towards Hopkins, the only receiver who had made it to the end zone. As Hopkins was attempting to catch the ball, Bills safety Jordan Poyer and cornerback Tre'Davious White tried to stop him from catching the ball by approaching him from the side and front to disrupt the play. The ball went into Hopkins' hands, and he managed to catch it above White and Poyer. Despite an attempt by safety Micah Hyde to knock the ball out of Hopkins' hands, Hopkins managed to maintain possession of the ball in the end zone, resulting in a 43-yard game-winning touchdown for the Cardinals.

== Game box score ==
Week Ten/Hail Murray: Buffalo Bills at Arizona Cardinals – Game summary

Quarter	1	2	3	4	Total
Bills	7	9	7	7	30
Cardinals	3	6	17	6	32

at State Farm Stadium, Glendale, Arizona

- Date: November 15
- Game time: 2:05 p.m. MST
- Game weather: Sunny, 78 °F (26 °C) (retractable roof open)
- Game attendance: 4,200
- Referee: Craig Wrolstad
- TV announcers (CBS): Ian Eagle, Charles Davis and Evan Washburn
- Recap, Gamebook

Game information

First quarter

- ARI – Zane Gonzalez 23-yard field goal, 9:53. Cardinals 3–0. Drive: 13 plays, 75 yards, 5:07.
- BUF – Josh Allen 12-yard pass from Isaiah McKenzie (Tyler Bass kick), 6:23. Bills 7–3. Drive: 7 plays, 63 yards, 3:30.

Second quarter

- BUF – Tyler Bass 54-yard field goal, 14:02. Bills 10–3. Drive: 10 plays, 31 yards, 5:21.
- ARI – Zane Gonzalez 42-yard field goal, 8:45. Bills 10–6. Drive: 10 plays, 51 yards, 5:17.
- BUF – Tyler Bass 55-yard field goal, 5:45. Bills 13–6. Drive: 8 plays, 33 yards, 3:00.
- ARI – Zane Gonzalez 21-yard field goal, 1:24. Bills 13–9. Drive: 16 plays, 72 yards, 4:21.
- BUF – Tyler Bass 58-yard field goal, 0:00. Bills 16–9. Drive: 7 plays, 34 yards, 1:24.

Third quarter

- BUF – Cole Beasley 22-yard pass from Josh Allen (Tyler Bass kick), 9:52. Bills 23–9. Drive: 3 plays, 37 yards, 1:35.
- ARI – Kyler Murray 1-yard run (Zane Gonzalez kick), 5:44. Bills 23–16. Drive: 9 plays, 75 yards, 4:08.
- ARI – Zane Gonzalez 45-yard field goal, 3:05. Bills 23–19. Drive: 4 plays, 3 yards, 1:30.
- ARI – Kyler Murray 15-yard run (Zane Gonzalez kick), 0:08. Cardinals 26–23. Drive: 3 plays, 56 yards, 1:05.

Fourth quarter

- BUF – Stefon Diggs 21-yard pass from Josh Allen (Tyler Bass kick), 0:34. Bills 30–26. Drive: 12 plays, 78 yards, 3:01.
- ARI – DeAndre Hopkins 43-yard pass from Kyler Murray (run failed), 0:02. Cardinals 32–30. Drive: 4 plays, 75 yards, 0:32.

Top passers

- BUF – Josh Allen – 32/49, 284 yards, 2 TD, 2 INT
- ARI – Kyler Murray – 22/32, 245 yards, TD, INT

Top rushers

- BUF – Josh Allen – 7 rushes, 38 yards
- ARI – Kenyan Drake – 16 rushes, 100 yards

Top receivers

- BUF – Cole Beasley – 11 receptions, 109 yards, TD
- ARI – DeAndre Hopkins – 7 receptions, 127 yards, TD

== Officials ==
- Referee: Craig Wrolstad (#4)
- Umpire: Ruben Fowler (#71)
- Down Judge: Jerry Bergman, Jr. (#91)
- Line Judge: David Oliver (#24)
- Field Judge: Aaron Santi (#50)
- Side Judge: Dave Hawkshaw (#107)
- Back Judge: Keith Ferguson (#61)
- Replay Official: Terri Valenti

== Broadcast calls of the play ==
=== TV (CBS) ===
Ian Eagle: Shotgun ... Murray. Out of the pocket. Seven seconds ... six seconds! Murray heaves it down field ... it is ... OH, IT'S CAUGHT! IT IS CAUGHT! DEANDRE HOPKINS ... MIRACULOUS! It's Murray Magic!

— CBS Sports' Ian Eagle calling the Hail Mary

=== Radio (Cardinals) ===
Dave Pasch: Murray back to throw, flushed out, rolling left in trouble, slips a tackle, gotta launch it, he does, left side, into the end zone, jump ball, and it is… is it caught?! Is it caught?! OH MY GOODNESS IT’S CAUGHT! DEANDRE HOPKINS CAUGHT IT! HE CAUGHT IT FOR A TOUCHDOWN! WITH ONE SECOND LEFT! I CAN’T BELIEVE IT! YOU’VE GOTTA BE JOKING ME! HOPKINS… REACHES UP WITH THREE DEFENDERS AROUND HIM, AND PULLS IT IN! AND THE CARDINALS LEAD IT 32-30 WITH A SECOND LEFT!
Ron Wolfley: YOU! CAN’T! COVER! ‘NUK! YOU’RE NOT GONNA BE ABLE TO COVER HIM! THROW THE BALL UP! THAT’S WHAT KYLER MURRAY DID! HE EXTENDED THE PLAY WITH HIS LEGS! AND JUST CHUCKED THAT THING UP INTO THE AIR! INTO THE DESERT SKY, BABY! AND D-HOP BROUGHT IT DOWN! TOUCHDOWN!

— KMVP-FM's Dave Pasch and Ron Wolfley calling the Hail Mary

=== Radio (Bills) ===
John Murphy: Murray, pressured, Bills rush four, Murray’s in trouble, gets away from it, rolls to his left, fires downfield, puts it up for grabs and it is…
Steve Tasker: Caught.
Murphy: Caught, caught for a touchdown. Unbelievable! Caught by DeAndre Hopkins. Surrounded by a couple Bills defenders, he went up and brought it down. Unbelievable! Incredible! One second left on the clock.
Tasker: Yeah, Bills lose. They got beat by DeAndre Hopkins making a phenomenal play, and that’s the kind of play he can make. He’s got the best hands in football. He’s a great athlete. He’s got tremendous ball skills. There were three guys around him, and the Bills still couldn’t stop it.

— WGR's John Murphy and Steve Tasker calling the Hail Mary

== Aftermath and significance ==
Leading by two points with 0:02 remaining in regulation, the Cardinals took a knee on the two-point conversion to prevent the possibility of the Bills blocking an extra point attempt and returning it to the other end zone for two points, which would have tied the game. The kneel-down also meant that the Cardinals did not cover the 2.5-point betting spread. Buffalo attempted a hook and ladder play on the ensuing kickoff, but was unsuccessful, securing the Cardinals' 32–30 win. This game marked just the second game in the last 60 years to feature two go-ahead touchdown passes within the final 40 seconds of the game.

The win improved the Cardinals' record to 6–3, placing them in a tie for first place in the NFC West with the Los Angeles Rams and the Seattle Seahawks. The loss dropped the Bills to a 7–3 mark. While they remained atop the AFC East standings, their lead over the Miami Dolphins dropped to a half-game. Hopkins was also named NFC Offensive Player of the Week for his performance.

Following the game, many past and present NFL players such as Patrick Mahomes, Tyreek Hill, Tyrann Mathieu, Randy Moss, Dez Bryant, and Kam Chancellor expressed amazement at Murray's throw and Hopkins' catch. Others, such as NBA player LeBron James, praised Hopkins for being able to catch and possess the ball. Sporting News called the play "one of the greatest game-winning Hail Mary passes in NFL history," while The Washington Post termed it the best play of the season to that point. NFL Films noted several coincidental ties between the "Hail Murray" and other notable plays in league history; the Helmet Catch during the New York Giants' win over the New England Patriots in Super Bowl XLII took place in the same stadium, while Bills receiver Stefon Diggs and Cardinals running back Kenyan Drake had been part of similar "miracle plays" for their previous teams: the Minneapolis Miracle and Miracle in Miami, respectively. In addition, CBS play-by-play announcer Ian Eagle, who called this game, had also called the Miracle in Miami. One of the pylons used to mark the end zone during the play was later sent to the Pro Football Hall of Fame for display.

In week 13 of the 2020 season, the Bills travelled back to State Farm Stadium to play the San Francisco 49ers, where the 49ers were playing as the home team due to a temporary ban on team sports in Santa Clara County, California, home of Levi's Stadium, as a result of the COVID-19 pandemic. During an interview prior to the game, NFL Network host Rich Eisen suggested to 49ers CEO Jed York that his team show the "Hail Murray" on the stadium screen and "blast it" prior to the Bills entering the field, commenting that Buffalo players would be "a little spooked coming into that building." However, Josh Allen had one of the best games of his career, with 375 passing yards, and Buffalo won the game handily, 34–24. As the Bills had already defeated the Los Angeles Rams in week 3 and the Seattle Seahawks in week 9, their win over the 49ers meant that the "Hail Murray" play singlehandedly cost them a season sweep of the NFC West, widely regarded as the league's toughest division in 2020.

After the Hail Murray game, the Cardinals went on to lose five of their final seven games to finish with an 8–8 record. They finished in third place in the NFC West and missed the playoffs. The Bills, meanwhile, rebounded from the loss to win six consecutive games, all of them by double digits, to finish in first place in the AFC East with a 13–3 record. They clinched their first AFC East title since 1995 and their third playoff berth in four years with a victory over Denver in week 15. The winning streak continued into the playoffs, as the Bills went on to win back-to-back playoff games over the Indianapolis Colts and Baltimore Ravens to clinch a spot in the AFC Championship Game. However, they lost to the Kansas City Chiefs, 38–24.

At the 10th NFL Honors, the play won the NFL Play of the Year award.

The Bills and Cardinals would not meet again until week 1 of the 2024 NFL season at Highmark Stadium, where the Bills defeated the Cardinals, 34–28. At the end of the game, Murray attempted another Hail Mary play, but the pass was deflected by Bills cornerback Ja'Marcus Ingram, denying a repeat of the Hail Murray.

== See also ==
- 2020 Arizona Cardinals season
- 2020 Buffalo Bills season
- List of Hail Mary passes in American football
- List of nicknamed NFL games and plays
