= Kenyan Drake =

American football player (born 1994)

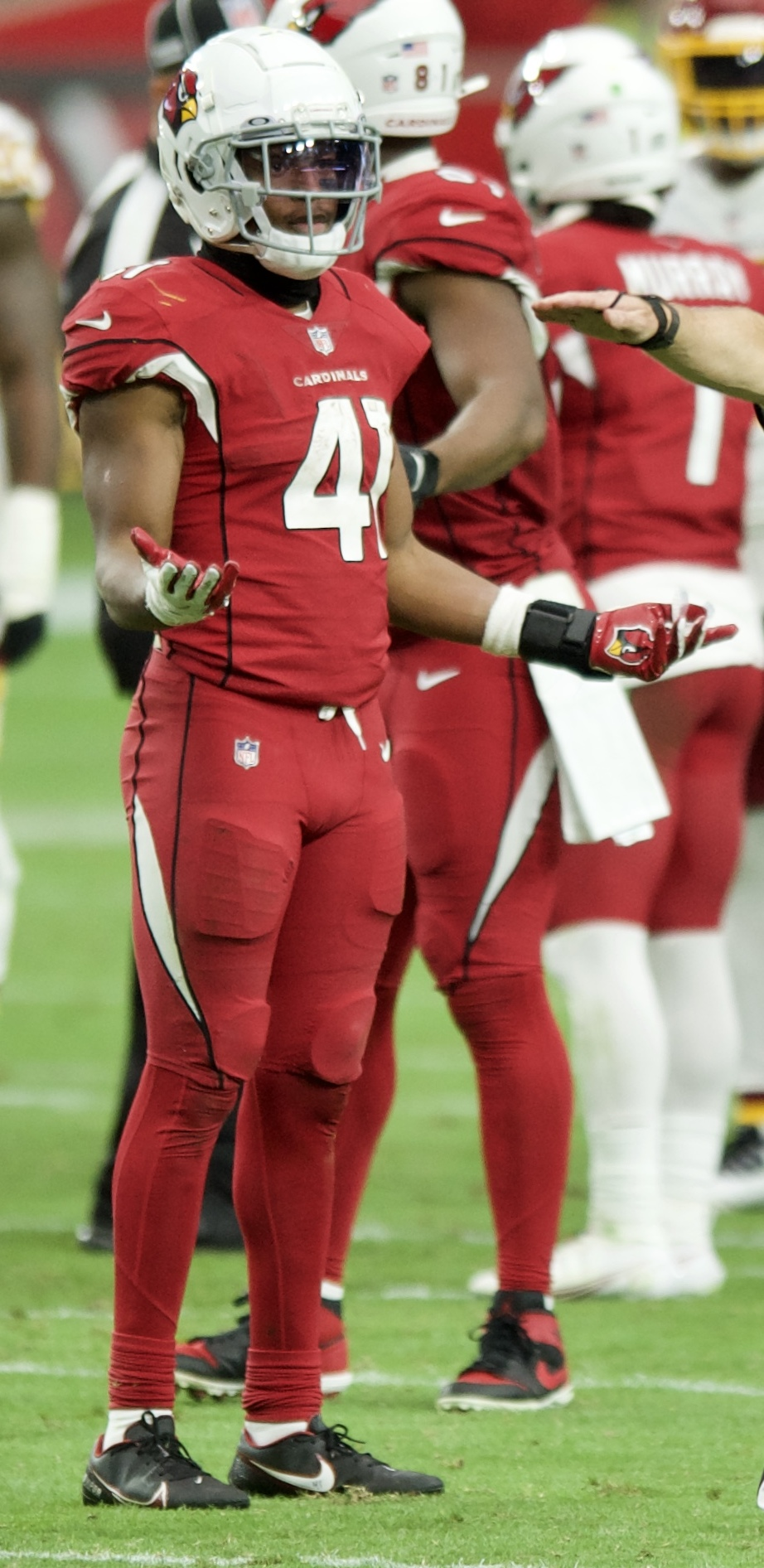
- Drake with the Arizona Cardinals in 2020

No. 32, 41, 23, 17, 37
- Position: Running back

Personal information
- Born: January 26, 1994 (age 32); Powder Springs, Georgia, U.S.
- Listed height: 6 ft 1 in (1.85 m)
- Listed weight: 216 lb (98 kg)

Career information
- High school: Hillgrove (Powder Springs)
- College: Alabama (2012–2015)
- NFL draft: 2016: 3rd round, 73rd overall pick

Career history
- Miami Dolphins (2016–2019); Arizona Cardinals (2019–2020); Las Vegas Raiders (2021); Baltimore Ravens (2022); Indianapolis Colts (2023)*; Baltimore Ravens (2023); Cleveland Browns (2023)*; Green Bay Packers (2023)
- * Offseason or practice squad member only

Awards and highlights
- CFP national champion (2015); BCS national champion (2012)

Career NFL statistics
- Rushing yards: 3,866
- Rushing average: 4.4
- Rushing touchdowns: 33
- Receptions: 218
- Receiving yards: 1,655
- Receiving touchdowns: 8
- Return yards: 964
- Return touchdowns: 1
- Stats at Pro Football Reference

Kenyan Drake (born January 26, 1994) is an American former professional football player who was a running back for eight seasons in the National Football League (NFL) for the Miami Dolphins, Arizona Cardinals, Las Vegas Raiders, Baltimore Ravens, and Green Bay Packers. He played college football for the Alabama Crimson Tide and was selected by the Dolphins in the third round of the 2016 NFL draft.

== Early life ==
Drake attended Hillgrove High School in Powder Springs, Georgia. He played football at Hillgrove. As a senior, he rushed for 1,610 yards with 18 touchdowns and was named the Gatorade Football Player of the Year for Georgia. He was rated as a four-star recruit by Rivals.com. He received offers from Alabama, Georgia, and Georgia Tech. He committed to the University of Alabama to play college football.

== College career ==
Drake attended and played college football for the University of Alabama from 2012–2015 under head coach Nick Saban.

As a true freshman in 2012, Drake played in 12 games as a backup to Eddie Lacy and T. J. Yeldon. On September 8, against Western Kentucky, he had a 32-yard rushing touchdown. Overall, in the 2012 season, he rushed for 281 yards on 42 carries with five touchdowns.

As a sophomore in 2013, Drake appeared in 11 games with one start as the backup to Yeldon. On September 28, against Ole Miss, he had 99 rushing yards and a rushing touchdown. On October 12, against Kentucky, he had 106 rushing yards, two rushing touchdowns, and three receptions for 44 yards. He followed that up with 104 rushing yards and two rushing touchdowns against Arkansas. He rushed for 694 yards on 92 carries with eight touchdowns and had 12 receptions for 135 yards and a touchdown.

In 2014, Drake played in only five games his junior year due to a broken leg suffered against Ole Miss on October 4.

Drake returned from the injury for his senior year in 2015. As a backup to Derrick Henry, he played in 13 games, missing two due to a broken arm. In the season opener against Wisconsin, he had 77 rushing yards, one rushing touchdown, and 48 receiving yards. In the next game, against Middle Tennessee State, he had 40 rushing yards, 91 receiving yards, and a receiving touchdown. Overall, Drake rushed for 408 yards on 77 carries with one touchdown and had 29 receptions for 276 yards and a touchdown. During Alabama's 45–40 win over Clemson in the 2016 College Football Playoff National Championship, he returned a kickoff 95 yards for a touchdown in the fourth quarter.

== Professional career ==
Pre-draft measurables
Height	Weight	Arm length	Hand span	40-yard dash	10-yard split	20-yard split	20-yard shuttle	Three-cone drill	Vertical jump	Broad jump	Bench press
6 ft 0 5/8 in (1.84 m)	210 lb (95 kg)	31 3/4 in (0.81 m)	9 3/4 in (0.25 m)	4.45 s	1.64 s	2.64 s	4.21 s	7.04 s	34 1/2 in (0.88 m)	10 ft 3 in (3.12 m)	10 reps
All values from NFL Combine

=== Miami Dolphins ===
==== 2016 season ====
Drake was selected by the Miami Dolphins in the third round, 73rd overall, in the 2016 NFL draft. He was the third running back to be selected that year.

Drake made his NFL debut in a 12–10 loss to the Seattle Seahawks at CenturyLink Field in their season opener. In the next game, against the New England Patriots, he scored his first professional rushing touchdown on a seven-yard rush in the fourth quarter. On November 6, against the New York Jets, he had a 96-yard kickoff return for a touchdown in the 27–23 victory. He played in all 16 games as a rookie, rushing for 179 yards with two touchdowns.

==== 2017 season ====
Drake entered the 2017 season as third on the depth chart. On October 31, 2017, starting running back Jay Ajayi was traded to the Philadelphia Eagles for a fourth round pick, leaving Drake as the second-string running back behind Damien Williams for Miami. After an injury to Williams in Week 12, Drake was named the starting running back. In Week 13, he rushed for a season-high 120 yards and scored a touchdown in a 35–9 win over the Denver Broncos. In Week 14, he totaled 193 yards from scrimmage against the Patriots, playing an integral part in the Dolphins' 27–20 upset win. In the aftermath of a scuffle against the Buffalo Bills in Week 17, in which he grabbed and tossed a Bills' player's helmet, Drake and teammate Jarvis Landry were ejected from the game. Drake finished the season with 644 yards on the ground and three touchdowns, playing in all 16 regular-season games with six starts.

==== 2018 season ====
Through the first six games of the Dolphins' 2018 season, Drake had 210 rushing yards and one rushing touchdown to go with 21 receptions for 145 receiving yards and a receiving touchdown. In Week 8, he recorded a rushing and a receiving touchdown in a loss to the Houston Texans. In Week 14 against the Patriots, Drake was a key part of the "Miracle in Miami". Trailing by five points with seven seconds to go, the Dolphins had the ball at their own 31-yard line. Quarterback Ryan Tannehill threw a pass over the middle that was caught by wide receiver Kenny Stills, who lateraled the ball to the right side of the field that was caught by DeVante Parker at midfield. Parker then lateraled the ball to Drake, who ran the ball 52 yards for a touchdown to win the game 34–33. Overall, he finished the 2018 season with 535 rushing yards and four rushing touchdowns, to go along with 53 receptions for 477 receiving yards and five receiving touchdowns.

==== 2019 season ====
In six games with the Dolphins in the 2019 season, Drake recorded 47 carries for 174 rushing yards and 22 receptions for 174 receiving yards.

As a Dolphin, Drake played in 54 games in three full seasons, starting in 16. He made 333 rushing attempts for 1,532 yards, averaging 4.6 yards per run, and scoring 9 rushing touchdowns.

=== Arizona Cardinals ===
==== 2019 season ====
On October 28, 2019, at the trade deadline, Drake was traded to the Arizona Cardinals for a conditional sixth-round pick, which became Miami's original fifth-round pick in the 2020 NFL draft. In his first game with the Cardinals, Drake posted 110 rushing yards with a touchdown against the San Francisco 49ers in Week 9, as the Cardinals lost 25–28. In Week 15 against the Cleveland Browns, Drake rushed 22 times for 137 yards with four touchdowns during their 38–24 win. During Week 16 against the Seahawks, Drake rushed 24 times for 166 yards with two touchdowns, which included a career-high 80-yard touchdown, as the Cardinals won 27–13.

For the entire 2019 season, Drake recorded 817 rushing yards and eight rushing touchdowns (all of which was scored as a Cardinal), to go along with 50 receptions for 345 receiving yards.

==== 2020 season ====
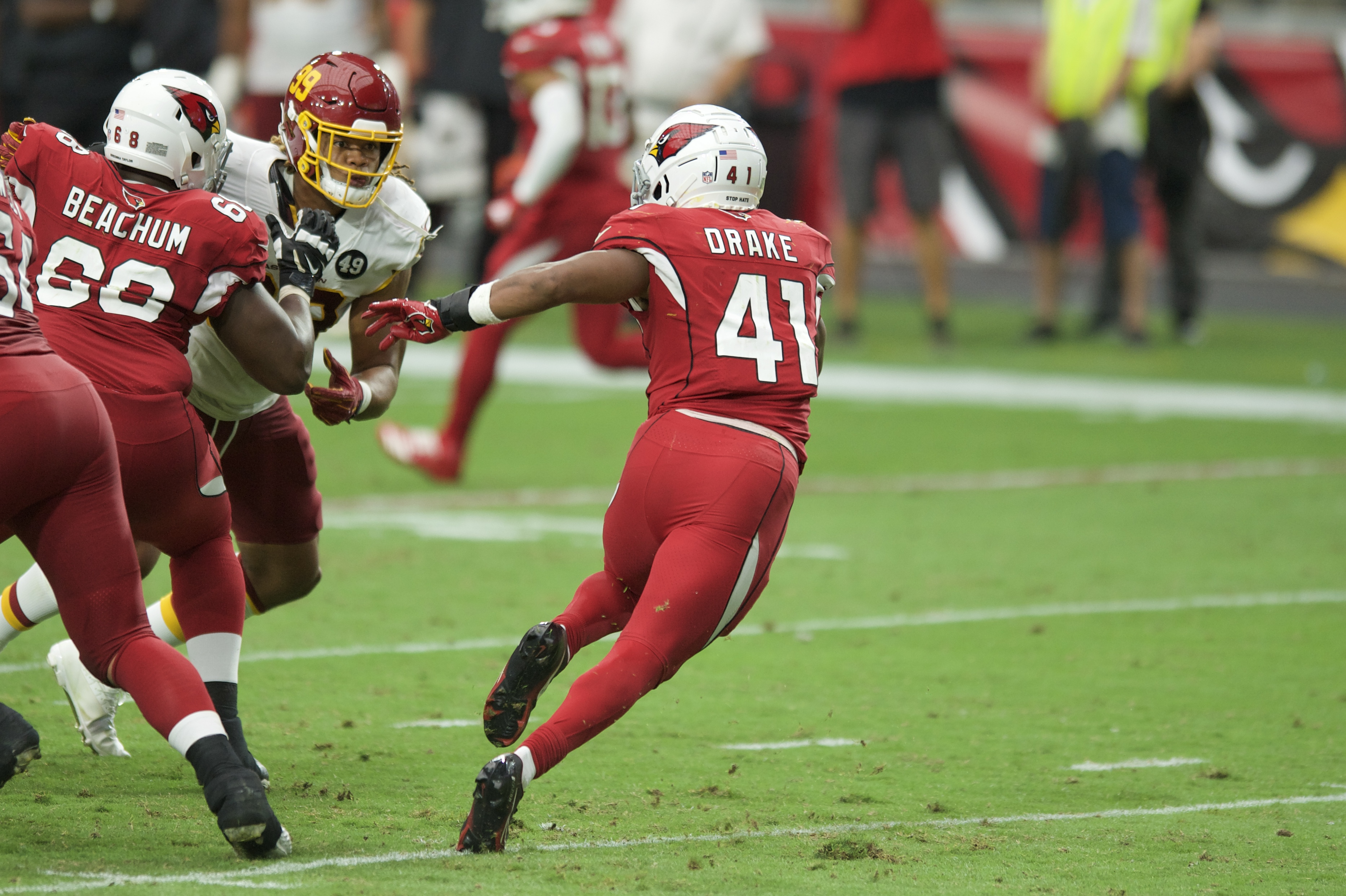
Drake playing against the Washington Football Team in 2020.

The Cardinals placed the transition tag on Drake on March 16, 2020. He signed the tender for one-year, earning $8.483 million, on March 27.

In Week 1 against the 49ers, Drake rushed for 60 yards and made his first rushing touchdown of the season during a 24–20 win. In Week 6 against the Dallas Cowboys, he had 20 carries for 164 rushing yards with two rushing touchdowns in a Cardinals 38–10 victory. In Week 10 against the Bills, Drake rushed for 100 yards in a 32–30 win referred to as "Hail Murray". In Week 12, against the Patriots, he had 22 carries for 78 rushing yards with two rushing touchdowns in a 20–17 loss.

Drake finished the 2020 season with 239 carries for 955 rushing yards, scoring ten rushing touchdowns.

=== Las Vegas Raiders ===
On March 19, 2021, Drake signed a two-year, $14.5 million contract with the Las Vegas Raiders. In a Week 6 win against the Broncos, he made one receiving touchdown and one rushing touchdown, which was the most he scored in a single game that season. On December 8, he was placed on injured reserve after suffering a broken right ankle in a Week 13 loss to the Washington Football Team. Drake finished the 2021 season with 63 carries for 254 rushing yards, scoring two rushing touchdowns. He also made 30 receptions for 291 receiving yards and scored one receiving touchdown.

On August 23, 2022, Drake was released by the Raiders.

=== Baltimore Ravens (first stint) ===
On August 31, 2022, Drake signed with the Baltimore Ravens. In Week 6, against the New York Giants, Drake had 119 rushing yards and one rushing touchdown in a 24–20 loss. In Week 9 against the New Orleans Saints, Drake rushed for 93 yards with two rushing touchdowns in a 27–13 victory. He ended the 2022 season playing in 12 games, while starting in 5, making 109 carries for 482 rushing yards and scored 4 rushing touchdowns. He had just 1 fumble that season, in a narrow Week 14 win against the Pittsburgh Steelers.

=== Indianapolis Colts ===
On August 5, 2023, Drake signed with the Indianapolis Colts. He was released on August 27 as part of their final roster cuts.

=== Baltimore Ravens (second stint) ===
On September 20, 2023, the Ravens signed Drake to their practice squad. After gaining zero yards on his only carry and losing a fumble against Indianapolis in Week 3, he was released on October 17.

=== Cleveland Browns ===
On October 31, 2023, the Browns signed Drake to their practice squad. He was released on November 28.

=== Green Bay Packers ===
On December 5, 2023, Drake was signed to the Green Bay Packers' practice squad. On January 12, 2024, Drake was released from the practice squad.

On July 19, 2024, Drake announced his retirement from professional football after eight seasons in the NFL.

== Career statistics ==
=== NFL ===
==== Regular season ====
Year	Team	Games		Rushing					Receiving					
Year	Team	GP	GS	Att	Yds	Avg	Lng	TD	Tgt	Rec	Yds	Avg	Lng	TD
2016	MIA	16	1	33	179	5.4	45T	2	10	9	46	5.1	9	0
2017	MIA	16	6	133	644	4.8	66T	3	48	32	239	7.5	47	1
2018	MIA	16	7	120	535	4.5	54T	4	73	53	477	9.0	52T	5
2019	MIA	6	2	47	174	3.7	11	0	33	22	174	7.9	26	0
2019	ARI	8	8	123	643	5.2	80T	8	35	28	171	6.1	21	0
2020	ARI	15	13	239	955	4.0	69T	10	31	25	137	5.5	18	0
2021	LV	12	2	63	254	4.0	21	2	39	30	291	9.7	31T	1
2022	BAL	12	5	109	482	4.5	40	4	26	17	89	4.7	15	1
2023	BAL	2	0	1	0	0	0	0	3	2	31	15.5	0	0
2023	GB	1	0	1	0	0	0	0	0	0	0	0	0	0
Career		104	44	869	3,866	4.4	80T	33	299	218	1,655	7.6	52	8
Source: pro-football-reference.com

==== Postseason ====
Year	Team	Games		Rushing					Receiving					
Year	Team	GP	GS	Att	Yds	Avg	Lng	TD	Tgt	Rec	Yds	Avg	Lng	TD
2016	MIA	1	0	0	0	0	0	0	0	0	0	0	0	0
Career		1	0	0	0	0	0	0	0	0	0	0	0	0
Source: pro-football-reference.com

=== College ===
Year	School	Conf	Class	Pos	G	Rushing				Receiving			
Year	School	Conf	Class	Pos	G	Att	Yds	Avg	TD	Rec	Yds	Avg	TD
2012	Alabama	SEC	FR	RB	12	42	281	6.7	5	0	0	0	0
2013	Alabama	SEC	SO	RB	11	92	694	7.5	8	12	135	11.3	1
2014	Alabama	SEC	JR	RB	5	22	112	5.1	4	5	159	31.8	2
2015	Alabama	SEC	SR	RB	13	77	408	5.3	1	29	276	9.5	1
Career						233	1,495	6.4	18	46	570	12.4	4
Source: sports-reference.com

== Personal life ==
Drake's younger brother, Isaiah Drake, is a professional baseball outfielder in the Atlanta Braves organization.
