= Wagoner High School =

Location
- 300 Bulldog Circle; Wagoner, Oklahoma; United States; 35.960119°N 95.374407°W

Information
- Type: Public Secondary
- Administrator: Noah Jameson Barney
- Principal: Ray Pennie
- Teaching staff: 38.86 (FTE)
- Grades: 9–12
- Enrollment: 599 (2023–2024)
- Student to teacher ratio: 15.41
- Colors: Red and black
- Athletics: Football, Basketball, Baseball, Softball, Volleyball, Track, Cheer, Band, Color guard, Tennis, Soccer,
- Mascot: Bulldog
- Rival: Coweta
- Website: www.wagonerps.org

Wagoner High School is a high school in Wagoner, Oklahoma, United States.

== Notable alumni ==
- Kevin Peterson, American football player
- Malcolm Rodriguez, American football player
