= Cameron Turner (American football) =

American football player and coach (born 1987)

Cam Turner
Indianapolis Colts
- Title: Quarterbacks coach

Personal information
- Born: July 29, 1987 (age 39); Huntington Beach, California, U.S.
- Listed height: 5 ft 11 in (1.80 m)
- Listed weight: 178 lb (81 kg)

Career information
- Positions: Wide receiver, quarterback
- High school: Libertyville (IL)
- College: The Citadel (2006–2009)

Career history
- The Citadel (2010) Wide receivers coach & special teams coordinator; Minnesota Vikings (2011–2012) Assistant to the head coach; FIU (2013–2014) Quarterbacks & wide receivers coach; Carolina Panthers (2015–2017); Assistant wide receivers coach (2015-2016); Assistant quarterbacks coach (2017); Arizona Cardinals (2018–2022); Offensive assistant (2018); Assistant quarterbacks coach (2019); Offensive assistant & assistant quarterbacks coach (2020); Quarterbacks coach (2021); Co–pass game coordinator & quarterbacks coach (2022); Indianapolis Colts (2023–present) Quarterbacks coach

Cam Turner (born July 29, 1987) is an American football coach who is the quarterbacks coach for the Indianapolis Colts of the National Football League (NFL). He previously served as an assistant coach for the Carolina Panthers and Minnesota Vikings.

== Playing career ==
=== The Citadel ===
Cam Turner played quarterback and wide receiver for The Citadel from 2006 to 2009. After redshirting his freshman year, Turner played two seasons at quarterback before injuring his shoulder and switching to wide receiver.

== Coaching career ==
=== The Citadel ===
After graduating from The Citadel, Turner began his coaching career in 2010, working with wide receivers and special teams at his alma mater The Citadel.

=== Minnesota Vikings ===
Turner got his first job in the NFL in 2011, where he was the assistant to head coach Leslie Frazier.

=== FIU ===
In 2013, Cam Turner was hired to coach quarterbacks and wide receivers for FIU. Cam joined his father Ron Turner, who was hired as head coach at FIU.

=== Carolina Panthers ===
On February 11, 2015, Turner was hired by the Carolina Panthers as assistant wide receivers coach. On March 2, 2017, Turner was named assistant quarterbacks coach.

=== Arizona Cardinals ===
On February 14, 2018, Turner was hired by the Arizona Cardinals as an offensive assistant under head coach Steve Wilks. On February 6, 2019, it was announcer that Turner had been retained under new head coach Kliff Kingsbury with the added title of assistant quarterbacks coach. On January 7, 2021, Turner was promoted to the Cardinals' quarterbacks coach, replacing Tom Clements, who announced his retirement from coaching. On May 10, 2022, Turner was promoted to the Cardinals' co–pass game coordinator along with Spencer Whipple.

=== Indianapolis Colts ===
On March 1, 2023, Turner was hired as quarterbacks coach for the Indianapolis Colts.

== Personal life ==
Turner is the son of former FIU head coach Ron Turner, nephew of Norv Turner and the cousin of Scott Turner.
