= Justin Murray =

American football player (born 1993)

No. 71, 67, 73
- Position: Offensive tackle

Personal information
- Born: April 19, 1993 (age 33); Cincinnati, Ohio, U.S.
- Listed height: 6 ft 5 in (1.96 m)
- Listed weight: 315 lb (143 kg)

Career information
- High school: Sycamore (Cincinnati)
- College: Cincinnati (2011–2015)
- NFL draft: 2016: undrafted

Career history
- Denver Broncos (2016–2017)*; Tampa Bay Buccaneers (2017)*; New Orleans Saints (2017)*; Cincinnati Bengals (2017); Oakland Raiders (2018); Arizona Cardinals (2019–2021); Buffalo Bills (2022); Las Vegas Raiders (2023)*; Tennessee Titans (2023); Cleveland Browns (2023)*
- * Offseason or practice squad member only

Career NFL statistics
- Games played: 41
- Games started: 20
- Stats at Pro Football Reference

Justin Murray (born April 19, 1993) is an American former professional football player who was an offensive tackle in the National Football League (NFL). He played college football for the Cincinnati Bearcats, and was signed by the Denver Broncos as an undrafted free agent in 2016. Murray was also a member of the Tampa Bay Buccaneers, New Orleans Saints, Cincinnati Bengals, Oakland Raiders, Arizona Cardinals, Buffalo Bills, Las Vegas Raiders, Tennessee Titans, and Cleveland Browns.

== Early life ==
Murray played high school football at Sycamore High School in Cincinnati, Ohio. While in high school, Murray set the Greater Miami Conference shot put record at 59'06.5".

== Professional career ==
Pre-draft measurables
Height	Weight	Arm length	Hand span	40-yard dash	10-yard split	20-yard split	20-yard shuttle	Three-cone drill	Vertical jump	Broad jump	Bench press
6 ft 4 5/8 in (1.95 m)	300 lb (136 kg)	34 in (0.86 m)	9 1/2 in (0.24 m)	4.93 s	1.70 s	2.85 s	4.79 s	8.01 s	29.5 in (0.75 m)	9 ft 8 in (2.95 m)	20 reps
All values from Pro Day

=== Denver Broncos ===
Murray signed with the Denver Broncos as an undrafted free agent on May 2, 2016. He was waived on September 3, 2016 and was signed to the practice squad the next day. After spending the entire season on the practice squad, Murray signed a reserve/future contract with the Broncos.

On September 2, 2017, Murray was waived by the Broncos.

=== Tampa Bay Buccaneers ===
On September 6, 2017, Murray was signed to the Tampa Bay Buccaneers' practice squad. He was released by the Buccaneers on November 22, 2017.

=== New Orleans Saints ===
On December 4, 2017, Murray was signed to the New Orleans Saints' practice squad.

=== Cincinnati Bengals ===
On December 20, 2017, Murray was signed by the Cincinnati Bengals off the Saints' practice squad.

On September 1, 2018, Murray was waived by the Bengals.

=== Oakland Raiders ===
On September 2, 2018, Murray was claimed off waivers by the Oakland Raiders.

On August 31, 2019, Murray was waived by the Raiders.

=== Arizona Cardinals ===
On September 1, 2019, Murray was claimed off waivers by the Arizona Cardinals. He started 12 games at right tackle for the Cardinals in 2019.

Murray re-signed with the Cardinals on a one-year exclusive-rights free agent tender on April 2, 2020. He signed a two-year contract extension with the Cardinals on October 2, 2020.

On October 8, 2021, Murray was placed on injured reserve after suffering a back injury in Week 3.

On August 30, 2022, Murray was released by the Cardinals.

=== Buffalo Bills ===
On September 27, 2022, Murray signed a one-year contract with the Buffalo Bills. He was released on January 12, 2023, and re-signed to the practice squad.

=== Las Vegas Raiders ===
On February 2, 2023, Murray signed a reserve/future contract with the Las Vegas Raiders. He was released on August 1.

=== Tennessee Titans ===
On August 5, 2023, Murray signed with the Tennessee Titans. He was released on August 31, 2023 and re-signed to the practice squad. He was promoted to the active roster on September 26. He was released on October 14.

=== Cleveland Browns ===
On November 7, 2023, Murray was signed to the Cleveland Browns practice squad. He signed a reserve/future contract on January 15, 2024. He retired from the NFL on April 17.
