= Spencer Whipple =

American football coach (born 1989)

Jacksonville Jaguars
- Title: Quarterbacks coach

Personal information
- Born: March 18, 1989 (age 37); Gibsonia, Pennsylvania, U.S.

Career information
- Position: Quarterback
- College: Miami (FL)

Career history
- Pittsburgh (2012–2013) Graduate assistant; UMass (2014) Tight ends coach; UMass (2015–2017) Wide receivers coach; UMass (2018) Passing game coordinator & quarterbacks coach; Arizona Cardinals (2019–2024) Offensive quality control coach (2019) Assistant wide receivers coach (2020–2021) Co–pass game coordinator (2022) Pass game specialist (2023–2024); Jacksonville Jaguars (2025–present) Quarterbacks coach

Spencer Whipple (born March 18, 1989) is an American professional football coach who is the quarterbacks coach for the Jacksonville Jaguars of the National Football League (NFL). He previously served in various assistant coaching roles for the Arizona Cardinals from 2019 to 2024 and previously coached five seasons at UMass.

== Early life ==
Spencer Whipple is the son of former UMass head coach, former Pittsburgh offensive coordinator Mark Whipple and former offensive coordinator for the Nebraska Cornhuskers. Spencer attended Pine-Richland High School (PA). During his senior season, he threw for nearly 1,500 and 11 touchdowns. He helped lead the Pine-Richland High School Rams to an 11-1 record and the subsequent Greater Allegheny Conference Championship.

== Playing career ==
In 2007, Whipple made the Pittsburgh team as a walk-on quarterback. He then spent the 2008 season at UMass with the Minutemen, serving as an understudy for quarterback Liam Coen. In 2009, Whipple transferred to Miami where his father, Mark Whipple, was the offensive coordinator. As the team's holder and backup quarterback, Whipple played in each game at Miami in 2010 and 2011. In 2011, his senior season, Whipple received the Mariutto Family Scholar-Athlete Award. That season, as the team's holder, he helped lead the Hurricanes to a perfect 39-for-39 on PAT attempts, as well as 11-for-14 on field goals.

== Coaching career ==
=== Pittsburgh ===
In 2012, Whipple joined Pittsburgh as a defensive graduate assistant and video assistant under head coach Paul Chryst.

=== UMass ===
In 2014, Whipple was hired as the tight ends coach for UMass. He joined his father, Mark Whipple, who was starting his second stint as head coach at UMass. In 2015, Spencer was named wide receivers coach, a position he held through the 2017 season. On February 5, 2018, he was promoted to passing game coordinator and quarterbacks coach.

=== Arizona Cardinals ===
On February 6, 2019, Whipple was hired by the Arizona Cardinals as an offensive quality control coach under head coach Kliff Kingsbury. On February 5, 2020, Whipple was promoted to assistant wide receivers coach. On May 10, 2022, he was promoted to co–pass game coordinator along with Cameron Turner.

On March 1, 2023, Whipple's role was shifted to pass game specialist.

=== Jacksonville Jaguars ===
On February 4, 2025, the Jacksonville Jaguars hired Whipple to serve as their quarterbacks coach.
