= Kevin Peterson =

American football player (born 1994)

Carolina Panthers
- Title: Defensive assistant

Personal information
- Born: March 22, 1994 (age 32); Muskogee, Oklahoma, U.S.
- Listed height: 5 ft 11 in (1.80 m)
- Listed weight: 185 lb (84 kg)

Career information
- Position: Cornerback (No. 47, 27)
- High school: Wagoner (Wagoner, Oklahoma)
- College: Oklahoma State (2012–2015)
- NFL draft: 2016: undrafted

Career history

Playing
- Chicago Bears (2016)*; Los Angeles Rams (2016–2018); Arizona Cardinals (2019–2020); Tennessee Titans (2021)*; Arizona Cardinals (2021)
- * Offseason or practice squad member only

Coaching
- CSU Pueblo (2024) Cornerbacks coach; Carolina Panthers (2025–present) Defensive assistant

Awards and highlights
- First-team All-Big 12 (2015)

Career NFL statistics
- Total tackles: 47
- Fumble recoveries: 2
- Pass deflections: 9
- Interceptions: 2
- Stats at Pro Football Reference

Kevin Lamont Peterson (born March 22, 1994) is an American former professional football player who was a cornerback for the Los Angeles Rams and Arizona Cardinals of the National Football League (NFL). He played college football for the Oklahoma State Cowboys.

== Early life ==
Peterson played high school football at Wagoner High School in Wagoner, Oklahoma. He recorded 1,621 rushing yards, 25 rushing touchdowns, 42 tackles and 3 interceptions his senior year in 2011, helping Wagoner win the Class 4A State title. This was the first football state championship in school history. In 2011, Peterson was named Oklahoma's Defensive Player of the Year by The Oklahoman and also earned SuperPrep All-American honors. He also participated in track and basketball at Wagoner. In May 2011, he won the state championship in both the 100 meters and 200 meters.

== College career ==
Peterson lettered for the Oklahoma State Cowboys of Oklahoma State University from 2012 to 2015. He played in 13 games, starting 1, in 2012, recording 16 solo tackles, 4 tackle assists and 2 pass breakups. He played in 12 games, starting 11, in 2013, recording 20 solo tackles, 4 tackle assists, 2 interceptions and 4 pass breakups. Peterson played in 13 games, all starts, in 2014, recording 53 solo tackles, 6 tackle assists, 2 interceptions and 11 pass breakups. He played in 12 games, starting 11, in 2015, recording 36 solo tackles, 6 tackles assists, 1 interception, 6 pass breakups and 1 fumble recovery. He missed the first game of the season due to injury. In 2015, Peterson was a Jim Thorpe Award semifinalst, earned First-team All-Big 12 Conference honors and was named a team captain. He majored in education at Oklahoma State. He was invited to play in the Senior Bowl in January 2016. However, he suffered a high-ankle sprain before the game and did not play in it.

== Professional career ==
=== Pre-draft ===
Peterson was rated the 42nd best cornerback in the 2016 NFL draft by NFLDraftScout.com. Lance Zierlein of NFL.com predicted that he would be drafted in the sixth or seventh round, stating "Size limitations make a move inside as a nickel corner possible, but he has enough quickness and coverage savvy to stick on a roster."

Pre-draft measurables
Height	Weight	Arm length	Hand span	Wingspan	40-yard dash	10-yard split	20-yard split	20-yard shuttle	Three-cone drill	Vertical jump	Broad jump	Bench press
5 ft 10 3/8 in (1.79 m)	181 lb (82 kg)	31 1/2 in (0.80 m)	8 5/8 in (0.22 m)	6 ft 3 3/4 in (1.92 m)	4.55 s	1.53 s	2.63 s	4.31 s	6.94 s	35.5 in (0.90 m)	10 ft 1 in (3.07 m)	14 reps
All values from NFL Combine/Pro Day

=== Chicago Bears ===
Peterson signed with the Chicago Bears as an undrafted free agent on May 9, 2016. He was waived by the Bears on August 30, re-signed by the team on September 1 and waived again on September 3.

=== Los Angeles Rams ===
Peterson was signed to the practice squad of the Los Angeles Rams on December 27, 2016. He signed a reserve/future contract with the Rams on January 3, 2017.

On September 4, 2017, Peterson was waived by the Rams and signed to the practice squad the next day. He was promoted to the active roster on September 16, waived on September 19 and signed to the team's practice squad on September 21. He was promoted back to the active roster on November 22, 2017.

On August 11, 2018, Peterson was placed on injured reserve after he suffered a torn ACL in the Rams' first preseason game. Without Peterson, the Rams reached Super Bowl LIII where they lost 13–3 to the New England Patriots.

Peterson was waived during final roster cuts on August 31, 2019.

=== Arizona Cardinals (first stint) ===
On September 1, 2019, Peterson was claimed off waivers by the Arizona Cardinals. He played in 14 games before being placed on injured reserve on December 18, 2019. He finished the season playing 14 games, with 22 tackles, and two passes defended.

On May 12, 2020, Peterson was re-signed by the Cardinals. On November 11, 2020, Peterson was placed on injured reserve with a concussion. He was activated on December 12, 2020, and finished the year with six tackles, one pass defended, and a recovered fumble in 12 games.

=== Tennessee Titans ===
On June 17, 2021, Peterson signed with the Tennessee Titans. He was placed on injured reserve on August 16, 2021. He was released on August 24 with an injury settlement.

=== Arizona Cardinals (second stint) ===
On October 13, 2021, Peterson was signed to the Cardinals practice squad. In the 2021 season, Peterson played primarily on special teams, finishing the year with eight tackles in four games.

== Coaching career ==
In 2023, Peterson spent time as a coach for both of his former NFL teams, the Los Angeles Rams and Arizona Cardinals, through the Bill Walsh Diversity Coaching Fellowship program. He was then the cornerbacks coach for the CSU Pueblo ThunderWolves in 2024. In February 2025, he joined the Carolina Panthers as a defensive assistant.
