= 2026 Arizona Cardinals season =

107th season in franchise history

- Owner: Michael Bidwill
- General manager: Monti Ossenfort
- Head coach: Mike LaFleur
- Offensive coordinator: Nathaniel Hackett
- Defensive coordinator: Nick Rallis
- Home stadium: State Farm Stadium

Results
- Record: 3–8
- Division place: 4th NFC West

Uniform
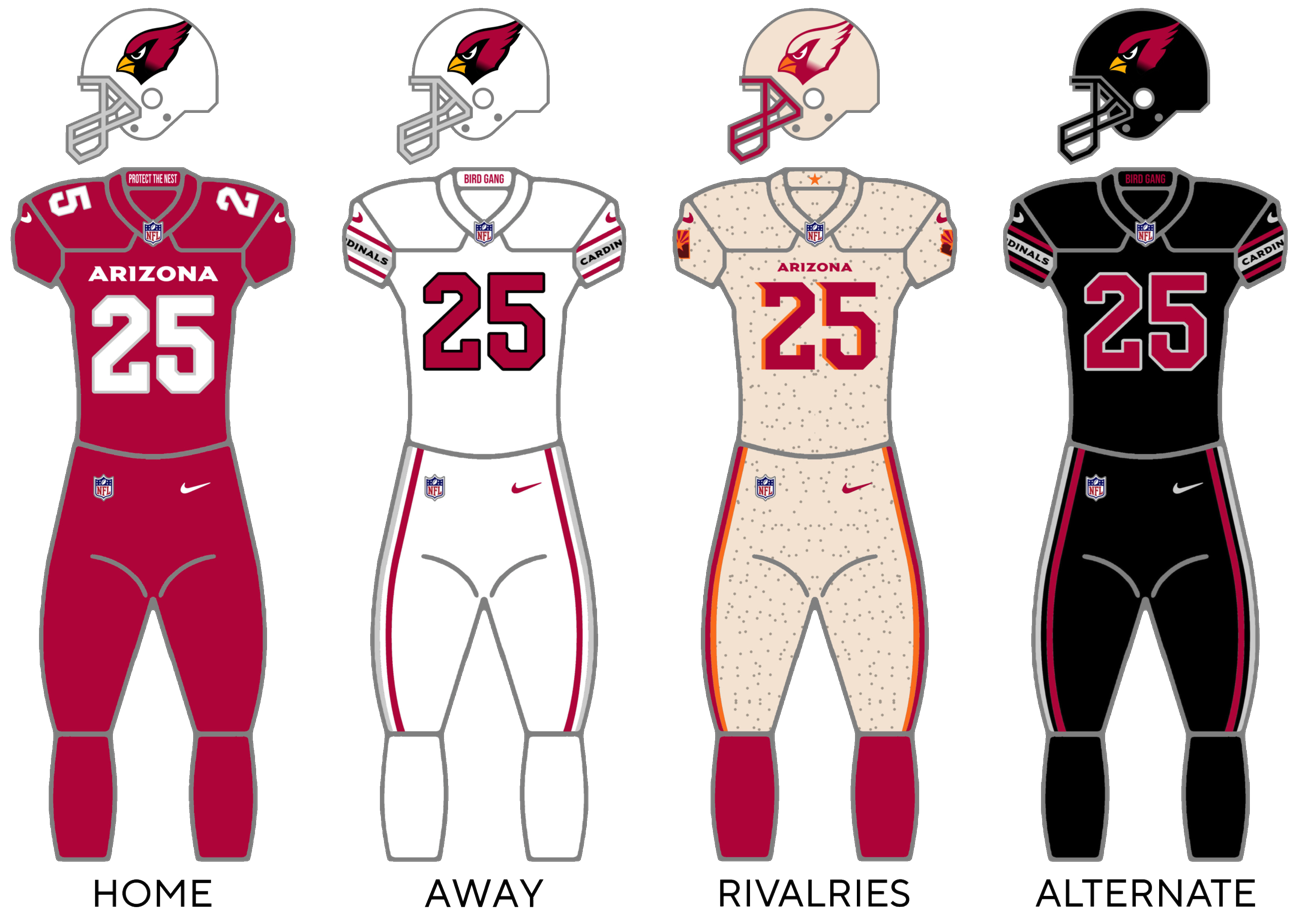

The 2026 season is the Arizona Cardinals' 107th in the National Football League (NFL), their 39th in Arizona, their 21st playing their homes games at State Farm Stadium, their fourth under general manager Monti Ossenfort and their first under head coach Mike LaFleur. They have at least matched their NFC-worst 3–14 record from 2025. They will try to improve on this record, make the playoffs after a four-year absence, and end their 10-year NFC West title drought. This season began with the team's third head coach in five seasons.

For the first time since the 2018 season, quarterback Kyler Murray was not on the roster, having been released on March 11.

== Offseason ==
=== Coaching changes ===
Following the end of the 2025 season, the Cardinals fired head coach Jonathan Gannon. Offensive coordinator Drew Petzing left the team to join the Detroit Lions. Nathaniel Hackett was hired to replace Petzing.

=== Draft ===
2026 Arizona Cardinals draft selections
| Round | Selection | Player | Position | College | Notes |
|---|---|---|---|---|---|
| 1 | 3 | Jeremiyah Love | RB | Notre Dame | |
| 2 | 34 | Chase Bisontis | G | Texas A&M | |
| 3 | 65 | Carson Beck | QB | Miami (FL) | |
| 4 | 104 | Kaleb Proctor | DT | Southeastern Louisiana | |
| 5 | 143 | Reggie Virgil | WR | Texas Tech | |
| 6 | 183 | Karson Sharar | LB | Iowa | |
| 7 | 217 | Jayden Williams | OT | Ole Miss | |

2026 Arizona Cardinals undrafted free agents
| Name | Position | College | Ref. |
|---|---|---|---|
| Elijah Culp | CB | James Madison | |
| Ka'ena De Cambra | OL | Arizona | |
| Jameson Geers | TE | Minnesota | |
| Cameron Robertson | OLB | SMU | |
| Harrison Wallace III | WR | Ole Miss | |
| Damonic Williams | DL | Oklahoma | |
| Wydett Williams Jr. | S | Ole Miss | |
| Stephen Dix Jr. | LB | Arkansas | |

Draft trades

== Staff ==
Arizona Cardinals staff
| Front office: Owner/chairman/president – Michael Bidwill; General manager – Monti Ossenfort; Assistant general manager – Dave Sears; Vice president of player personnel – Rob Kisiel; Vice president of football operations & facilities – Matt Caracciolo; Vice president of football administration – Matt Harriss; Director of pro personnel – Glen Fox; Director of college scouting – Vacant; Assistant director of college scouting – Alfonza Knight; Head coach: Head coach – Mike LaFleur; Offensive coaches: Offensive coordinator – Nathaniel Hackett; Quarterbacks – Matt Schaub; Running backs – Matt Merritt; Wide receivers – Tony Sorrentino; Tight ends – Jake Moreland; Offensive line – Justin Frye; Assistant offensive line – Chris Cook; Pass game specialist – Connor Senger; Offensive quality control – Brett Ekkens; Bill Bidwill fellowship – Wendy Laurent | Defensive coaches: Defensive coordinator – Nick Rallis; Defensive line – Pete Kwiatkowski; Assistant defensive line – Alec Osborne; Outside linebackers – Matt Feeney; Inside linebackers – Rod Wilson; Defensive backs – Cristian Garcia; Cornerbacks – Zac Etheridge; Senior defensive assistant – Teryl Austin; Defensive quality control – Brent Jackson; Special teams coaches: Special teams coordinator – Michael Ghobrial; Assistant special teams – Sam Sewell; Strength and conditioning: Director, football performance – Shea Thompson; Head strength and conditioning – Kyle Sammons; Assistant strength and conditioning – Matt King; Assistant strength and conditioning – Rich Pruett; Reconditioning/Assistant strength and conditioning – Aaron Sanchez; Senior reconditioning coordinator – Buddy Morris; → Coaching staff → Front office → More NFL staffs |

== Active roster ==
Arizona Cardinals roster
| Quarterbacks (QB): 18 Joey Aguilar; 19 Carson Beck; 9 Josh Johnson; Running backs (RB): 22 Tyler Allgeier; 26 Evan Hull; 20 Bam Knight; Wide receivers (WR): 81 Devin Duvernay RS; 80 Simi Fehoko; 82 Reggie Virgil; 83 Harrison Wallace III; Tight ends (TE): 84 Elijah Higgins; 89 Hunter Long; 85 Trey McBride; 47 Teagan Quitoriano | Offensive linemen (OL): 74 Isaiah Adams RG; 58 Hayden Conner LG; 64 Kingsley Eguakun C; 72 Hjalte Froholdt C; 78 Josh Fryar RT; 71 Jon Gaines II RG; 73 Isaac Seumalo LG; 65 Elijah Wilkinson RT; 66 Jayden Williams LT; 79 Jedrick Wills LT; Defensive linemen (DL): 95 Andrew Billings NT; 91 L.J. Collier DT; 98 Jared Harrison-Hunte DE; 51 Roy Lopez NT; 97 Walter Nolen DT; 56 Darius Robinson DT; 55 Dante Stills DT | Linebackers (LB): 5 Baron Browning OLB; 25 Zaven Collins OLB; 50 Jack Gibbens ILB; 54 Eku Leota OLB; 43 Karson Sharar ILB; 0 Cody Simon ILB; 10 Josh Sweat OLB; 1 Mack Wilson ILB; Defensive backs (DB): 3 Budda Baker S; 29 Denzel Burke CB; 13 Kei'Trel Clark CB; 36 Kitan Crawford S; 35 Kalen King CB; 16 Max Melton CB; 42 Dadrion Taylor-Demerson S; 24 Starling Thomas V CB; 21 Garrett Williams CB; 31 Wydett Williams Jr. S; Special teams (ST): 12 Blake Gillikin P; 59 Casey Kreiter LS; 38 Chad Ryland K | Practice squad: -- Ronnie Bell WR; 44 Shawn Bowman TE; 75 Austin Deculus T; 39 Phillip Dorsett WR; 34 Jerome Ford RB; 23 Art Green CB; 30 Shedrick Jackson WR; 67 Demontrey Jacobs T; 7 Zay Jones WR; -- Bub Means WR; -- Jerrick Reed II S; 49 Cameron Robertson OLB; 63 Jamaree Salyer G; 69 Valentin Senn T (IPP); 41 Bradyn Swinson OLB; 96 Damonic Williams NT; 53 Riley Wilson LB; 45 Kenny Yeboah TE (PS/I); Reserve: 33 Trey Benson RB (IR); 57 Chase Bisontis RG (IR); 32 Joey Blount S (IR); 17 Kendrick Bourne WR (IR); 86 Jalen Brooks WR (IR); 52 Jordan Burch OLB (IR); 90 Zachary Carter NT (IR/DFR); 6 James Conner RB (IR/DFR); 70 Paris Johnson Jr. LT (IR); 2 Will Johnson CB (IR); 4 Jeremiyah Love RB (IR); 15 Gardner Minshew II QB (IR); 94 Kaleb Proctor DE (IR); 87 Tip Reiman TE (PUP); 14 Michael Wilson WR (IR); 28 Andrew Wingard S (IR) 52 active, 16 practice squad (1 IPP), 17 reserve As of November 19, 2026. Rookies in italics.; Roster; Depth chart; Transactions |

== Preseason ==
| Week | Date | Opponent | Result | Record | Venue | Recap |
|---|---|---|---|---|---|---|
| HOF | August 6 | vs. Carolina Panthers | L 30–33 | 0–1 | Tom Benson Hall of Fame Stadium | Recap |
| 1 | August 13 | at Las Vegas Raiders | W 27–14 | 1–1 | Allegiant Stadium | Recap |
| 2 | August 22 | Dallas Cowboys | L 13–34 | 1–2 | State Farm Stadium | Recap |
| 3 | August 28 | at Green Bay Packers | L 38–42 | 1–3 | Lambeau Field | Recap |

== Regular season ==
=== Schedule ===
Note: The state of Arizona lies entirely within the Mountain Time Zone; however, Daylight saving time is only observed within the Navajo Nation.
As a result, all times prior to November 1 are aligned with Pacific Daylight Time, not Mountain Daylight Time.

| Week | Date | Time (MST) | Opponent | Result | Record | Venue | Network | Recap |
|---|---|---|---|---|---|---|---|---|
| 1 | September 13 | 1:25 p.m. | at Los Angeles Chargers | **W** 26–14 | 1–0 | SoFi Stadium | CBS | Recap |
| 2 | September 20 | 1:25 p.m. | **Seattle Seahawks** | **L** 7–31 | 1–1 | State Farm Stadium | Fox | Recap |
| 3 | September 27 | 1:05 p.m. | at **San Francisco 49ers** | **L** 30–36 | 1–2 | Levi's Stadium | Fox | Recap |
| 4 | October 4 | 10:00 a.m. | at New York Giants | **L** 24–36 | 1–3 | MetLife Stadium | CBS | Recap |
| 5 | October 11 | 1:25 p.m. | Detroit Lions | **L** 21–45 | 1–4 | State Farm Stadium | Fox | Recap |
| 6 | October 18 | 1:05 p.m. | at **Los Angeles Rams** | **W** 18–16 | 2–4 | SoFi Stadium | Fox | Recap |
| 7 | October 25 | 1:05 p.m. | Denver Broncos | **L** 16–30 | 2–5 | State Farm Stadium | CBS | Recap |
| 8 | November 1 | 11:00 a.m. | at Dallas Cowboys | **W** 33–30 (OT) | 3–5 | AT&T Stadium | Fox | Recap |
| 9 | November 8 | 2:25 p.m. | at **Seattle Seahawks** | **L** 3–17 | 3–6 | Lumen Field | Fox | Recap |
| 10 | November 15 | 2:05 p.m. | **Los Angeles Rams** | **L** 6–34 | 3–7 | State Farm Stadium | CBS | Recap |
| 11 | November 22 | 11:00 a.m. | at Kansas City Chiefs | **L** 7–34 | 3–8 | Arrowhead Stadium | CBS | Recap |
| 12 | November 29 | 2:25 p.m. | Washington Commanders | | | State Farm Stadium | Fox | |
| 13 | December 6 | 2:05 p.m. | Philadelphia Eagles | | | State Farm Stadium | Fox | |
| 14 | Bye | | | | | | | |
| 15 | December 20 | 2:05 p.m. | New York Jets | | | State Farm Stadium | Fox | |
| 16 | December 27 | 11:00 a.m. | at New Orleans Saints | | | Caesars Superdome | Fox | |
| 17 | January 3 | 2:05 p.m. | Las Vegas Raiders | | | State Farm Stadium | CBS | |
| 18 | January 9/10 | TBD | **San Francisco 49ers** | | | State Farm Stadium | TBD | |

Notes

- Intra-division opponents are in **bold** text.
- Networks, dates and times from Weeks 13–17 are subject to change as a result of flexible scheduling.
- The date, time and network for Week 18 will be finalized at the end of Week 17.

=== Game summaries ===
==== Week 1: at Los Angeles Chargers ====
Week 1: Arizona Cardinals at Los Angeles Chargers – Game summary

| Quarter | 1 | 2 | 3 | 4 | Total |
|---|---|---|---|---|---|
| **Cardinals** | 7 | 6 | 3 | 10 | **26** |
| Chargers | 7 | 0 | 7 | 0 | **14** |

at SoFi Stadium, Inglewood, California

- Date: September 13
- Game time: 1:25 p.m. MST & PDT
- Game weather: Sunny, 78 °F (26 °C) (fixed roof)
- Game attendance: 70,540
- Referee: Ron Torbert
- TV announcers (CBS): Kevin Harlan, Trent Green and Melanie Collins
- Recap, Game Book

Game information

**First quarter**

- ARI – Jeremiyah Love 5-yard run (Chad Ryland kick), 8:49. Cardinals 7–0. **Drive: 11 plays, 70 yards, 6:11.**
- LAC – Omarion Hampton 8-yard run (Cameron Dicker kick), 4:22. Tied 7–7. **Drive: 8 plays, 77 yards, 4:27.**

**Second quarter**

- ARI – Chad Ryland 27-yard field goal, 6:51. Cardinals 10–7. **Drive: 12 plays, 57 yards, 6:31.**
- ARI – Chad Ryland 44-yard field goal, 0:00. Cardinals 13–7. **Drive: 8 plays, 61 yards, 1:55.**

**Third quarter**

- ARI – Chad Ryland 34-yard field goal, 7:25. Cardinals 16–7. **Drive: 10 plays, 75 yards, 4:41.**
- LAC – Ladd McConkey 8-yard pass from Justin Herbert (Cameron Dicker kick), 6:03. Cardinals 16–14. **Drive: 10 plays, 75 yards, 4:41.**

**Fourth quarter**

- ARI – Trey McBride 3-yard pass from Jacoby Brissett (Chad Ryland kick), 11:44. Cardinals 23–14. **Drive: 2 plays, 3 yards, 0:37.**
- ARI – Chad Ryland 49-yard field goal, 2:33. Cardinals 26–14. **Drive: 4 plays, 8 yards, 1:36.**

**Top passers**

- ARI – Jacoby Brissett – 27/37, 277 yards, TD
- LAC – Justin Herbert – 17/27, 209 yards, TD, INT

**Top rushers**

- ARI – Tyler Allgeier – 17 rushes, 61 yards
- LAC – Omarion Hampton – 12 rushes, 43 yards, TD

**Top receivers**

- ARI – Trey McBride – 9 receptions, 95 yards, TD
- LAC – Ladd McConkey – 5 receptions, 82 yards, TD

With the upset win, the Cardinals secured both their first road win over the Chargers since 2001, and their first overall win since Week 9 of 2025, snapping a nine-game losing streak.

==== Week 2: vs. Seattle Seahawks ====
Week 2: Seattle Seahawks at Arizona Cardinals – Game summary

| Quarter | 1 | 2 | 3 | 4 | Total |
|---|---|---|---|---|---|
| **Seahawks** | 7 | 0 | 10 | 14 | **31** |
| Cardinals | 0 | 7 | 0 | 0 | **7** |

at State Farm Stadium, Glendale, Arizona

- Date: September 20
- Game time: 1:25 p.m. MST
- Game weather: None (retractable roof closed)
- Game attendance: 63,191
- Referee: Alan Eck
- TV announcers (Fox): Chris Myers, Mark Schlereth and Jen Hale
- Recap, Game Book

Game information

**First quarter**

- SEA – Jaxon Smith-Njigba 82-yard pass from Drew Lock (Jason Myers kick), 12:25. Seahawks 7–0. **Drive: 2 plays, 86 yards, 0:54.**

**Second quarter**

- ARI – Trey McBride 2-yard pass from Jacoby Brissett (Chad Ryland kick), 14:57. Tied 7–7. **Drive: 12 plays, 61 yards, 6:19.**

**Third quarter**

- SEA – Jaxon Smith-Njigba 7-yard pass from Drew Lock (Jason Myers kick), 12:27. Seahawks 14–7. **Drive: 4 plays, 37 yards, 2:33.**
- SEA – Jason Myers 33-yard field goal, 6:47. Seahawks 17–7. **Drive: 8 plays, 29 yards, 4:46.**

**Fourth quarter**

- SEA – Jaxon Smith-Njigba 12-yard pass from Drew Lock (Jason Myers kick), 12:40. Seahawks 24–7. **Drive: 10 plays, 80 yards, 5:33.**
- SEA – AJ Barner 1-yard run (Jason Myers kick), 1:11. Seahawks 31–7. **Drive: 16 plays, 70 yards, 10:14.**

**Top passers**

- SEA – Drew Lock – 19/26, 235 yards, 3 TD
- ARI – Jacoby Brissett – 17/28, 95 yards, TD, INT

**Top rushers**

- SEA – Emanuel Wilson – 21 rushes, 92 yards
- ARI – Jeremiyah Love – 9 rushes, 29 yards

**Top receivers**

- SEA – Jaxon Smith-Njigba – 9 receptions, 155 yards, 3 TD
- ARI – Trey McBride – 8 receptions, 41 yards, TD

This marked the Cardinals' 10th consecutive loss to the Seahawks since 2021, their eighth straight at home and seventh against the NFC West.

==== Week 3: at San Francisco 49ers ====
Week 3: Arizona Cardinals at San Francisco 49ers – Game summary

| Quarter | 1 | 2 | 3 | 4 | Total |
|---|---|---|---|---|---|
| Cardinals | 0 | 6 | 7 | 17 | **30** |
| **49ers** | 7 | 10 | 6 | 13 | **36** |

at Levi's Stadium, Santa Clara, California

- Date: September 27
- Game time: 1:05 p.m. MST & PDT
- Game weather: Sunny, 70 °F (21 °C)
- Game attendance: 70,687
- Referee: Brad Allen
- TV announcers (Fox): Kevin Kugler, Daryl Johnston and Allison Williams
- Recap, Game Book

Game information

**First quarter**

- SF – Mike Evans 2-yard pass from Brock Purdy, lateral 80-yards to Deebo Samuel (Eddy Pineiro kick), 8:26. 49ers 7–0. **Drive: 3 plays, 80 yards, 0:52.**

**Second quarter**

- SF – Mike Evans 23-yard pass from Brock Purdy (Eddy Pineiro kick), 14:55. 49ers 14–0. **Drive: 10 plays, 93 yards, 5:16.**
- ARI – Chad Ryland 26-yard field goal, 3:04. 49ers 14–3. **Drive: 14 plays, 54 yards, 8:09.**
- ARI – Chad Ryland 41-yard field goal, 0:23. 49ers 14–6. **Drive: 8 plays, 59 yards, 1:07.**
- SF – Eddy Pineiro 57-yard field goal, 0:00. 49ers 17–6. **Drive: 3 plays, 34 yards, 0:23.**

**Third quarter**

- SF – Christian McCaffrey 1-yard run (kick failed), 11:07. 49ers 23–6. **Drive: 7 plays, 56 yards, 3:53.**
- ARI – Michael Wilson 5-yard pass from Jacoby Brissett (Chad Ryland kick), 3:02. 49ers 23–13. **Drive: 14 plays, 69 yards, 8:05.**

**Fourth quarter**

- ARI – Jeremiyah Love 1-yard pass from Jacoby Brissett (Chad Ryland kick), 13:06. 49ers 23–20. **Drive: 5 plays, 28 yards, 2:25.**
- SF – George Kittle 10-yard pass from Brock Purdy (kick failed), 8:42. 49ers 29–20. **Drive: 8 plays, 65 yards, 4:24.**
- ARI – Jacoby Brissett 1-yard run (Chad Ryland kick), 2:51. 49ers 29–27. **Drive: 14 plays, 68 yards, 5:51.**
- SF – George Kittle 20-yard pass from Brock Purdy (Eddy Pineiro kick), 1:31. 49ers 36–27. **Drive: 7 plays, 65 yards, 1:20.**
- ARI – Chad Ryland 49-yard field goal, 0:34. 49ers 36–30. **Drive: 5 plays, 35 yards, 0:57.**

**Top passers**

- ARI – Jacoby Brissett – 38/52, 280 yards, TD
- SF – Brock Purdy – 15/27, 297 yards, 4 TD

**Top rushers**

- ARI – Jeremiyah Love – 21 rushes, 90 yards
- SF – Christian McCaffrey – 15 rushes, 75 yards, TD

**Top receivers**

- ARI – Michael Wilson – 11 receptions, 89 yards, TD
- SF – George Kittle – 6 receptions, 82 yards, 2 TD

This marked the Cardinals' eighth consecutive divisional loss.

==== Week 4: at New York Giants ====
Week 4: Arizona Cardinals at New York Giants – Game summary

| Quarter | 1 | 2 | 3 | 4 | Total |
|---|---|---|---|---|---|
| Cardinals | 14 | 3 | 7 | 0 | **24** |
| **Giants** | 3 | 16 | 8 | 9 | **36** |

at MetLife Stadium, East Rutherford, New Jersey

- Date: October 4
- Game time: 1:00 p.m. EDT/10:00 a.m. MST
- Game weather: Overcast, 63 °F (17 °C)
- Game attendance: 80,893
- Referee: Shawn Smith
- TV announcers (CBS): Spero Dedes, Adam Archuleta and Aditi Kinkhabwala
- Recap, Game Book

Game information

**First quarter**

- ARI – Marvin Harrison Jr. 12-yard pass from Jacoby Brissett (Chad Ryland kick), 11:08. Cardinals 7–0. **Drive: 8 plays, 58 yards, 3:52.**
- NYG – Dominic Zvada 39-yard field goal, 6:36. Cardinals 7–3. **Drive: 10 plays, 56 yards, 4:32.**
- ARI – Tyler Allgeier 22-yard run (Chad Ryland kick), 3:05. Cardinals 14–3. **Drive: 6 plays, 74 yards, 3:31.**

**Second quarter**

- NYG – Dominic Zvada 50-yard field goal, 14:55. Cardinals 14–6. **Drive: 6 plays, 13 yards, 3:10.**
- NYG – Malachi Fields 12-yard pass from Jameis Winston (pass failed), 4:30. Cardinals 14–12. **Drive: 7 plays, 56 yards, 3:57.**
- NYG – Malik Nabers 25-yard pass from Jameis Winston (Dominic Zvada kick), 2:24. Giants 19–14. **Drive: 2 plays, 26 yards, 0:45.**
- ARI – Chad Ryland 60-yard field goal, 0:00. Giants 19–17. **Drive: 4 plays, 33 yards, 0:24.**

**Third quarter**

- ARI – Elijah Higgins 2-yard pass from Jacoby Brissett (Chad Ryland kick), 7:20. Cardinals 24–19. **Drive: 10 plays, 37 yards, 5:09.**
- NYG – Theo Johnson 11-yard pass from Jameis Winston (Najee Harris run), 1:44. Giants 27–24. **Drive: 9 plays, 76 yards, 5:36.**

**Fourth quarter**

- NYG – Dominic Zvada 52-yard field goal, 2:11. Giants 30–24. **Drive: 7 plays, 16 yards, 2:36.**
- NYG – Deonte Banks 98-yard interception return, 0:00. Giants 36–24.

**Top passers**

- ARI – Jacoby Brissett – 21/35, 166 yards, 2 TD, 3 INT
- NYG – Jameis Winston – 18/29, 250 yards, 3 TD, 2 INT

**Top rushers**

- ARI – Jeremiyah Love – 14 rushes, 63 yards
- NYG – Cam Skattebo – 18 rushes, 56 yards

**Top receivers**

- ARI – Michael Wilson – 7 receptions, 95 yards
- NYG – Malik Nabers – 6 receptions, 112 yards, TD

==== Week 5: vs. Detroit Lions ====
Week 5: Detroit Lions at Arizona Cardinals – Game summary

| Quarter | 1 | 2 | 3 | 4 | Total |
|---|---|---|---|---|---|
| **Lions** | 0 | 24 | 14 | 7 | **45** |
| Cardinals | 7 | 0 | 7 | 7 | **21** |

at State Farm Stadium, Glendale, Arizona

- Date: October 11
- Game time: 1:25 p.m. MST
- Game weather: None (retractable roof closed)
- Game attendance: 60,968
- Referee: Carl Cheffers
- TV announcers (Fox): Kevin Kugler, Daryl Johnston and Allison Williams
- Recap, Game Book

Game information

**First quarter**

- ARI – Teagan Quitoriano 2-yard pass from Jacoby Brissett (Chad Ryland kick), 5:06. Cardinals 7–0. **Drive: 14 plays, 73 yards, 7:54.**

**Second quarter**

- DET – Jahmyr Gibbs 1-yard run (Jake Bates kick), 12:22. Tied 7–7. **Drive: 7 plays, 54 yards, 1:56.**
- DET – Sam LaPorta 38-yard pass from Jared Goff (Jake Bates kick), 9:30. Lions 14–7. **Drive: 4 plays, 47 yards, 1:21.**
- DET – Jameson Williams 8-yard pass from Jared Goff (Jake Bates kick), 4:50. Lions 21–7. **Drive: 9 plays, 75 yards, 3:39.**
- DET – Jake Bates 46-yard field goal, 0:53. Lions 24–7. **Drive: 8 plays, 35 yards, 2:10.**

**Third quarter**

- DET – Jameson Williams 39-yard pass from Jared Goff (Jake Bates kick), 9:42. Lions 31–7. **Drive: 5 plays, 57 yards, 2:37.**
- ARI – Teagan Quitoriano 13-yard pass from Jacoby Brissett (Chad Ryland kick), 4:22. Lions 31–14. **Drive: 10 plays, 72 yards, 5:20.**
- DET – Jared Goff 1-yard run (Jake Bates kick), 1:05. Lions 38–14. **Drive: 8 plays, 74 yards, 3:17.**

**Fourth quarter**

- DET – Jahmyr Gibbs 3-yard run (Jake Bates kick), 5:03. Lions 45–14. **Drive: 13 plays, 79 yards, 7:52.**
- ARI – Trey McBride 9-yard pass from Jacoby Brissett (Chad Ryland kick), 2:11. Lions 45–21. **Drive: 13 plays, 78 yards, 2:52.**

**Top passers**

- DET – Jared Goff – 19/30, 271 yards, 3 TD
- ARI – Jacoby Brissett – 29/47, 292 yards, 3 TD, INT

**Top rushers**

- DET – Jahmyr Gibbs – 25 rushes, 151 yards, 2 TD
- ARI – Jeremiyah Love – 12 rushes, 22 yards

**Top receivers**

- DET – Sam LaPorta – 5 receptions, 88 yards, TD
- ARI – Kendrick Bourne – 5 receptions, 70 yards

==== Week 6: at Los Angeles Rams ====
Week 6: Arizona Cardinals at Los Angeles Rams – Game summary

| Quarter | 1 | 2 | 3 | 4 | Total |
|---|---|---|---|---|---|
| **Cardinals** | 3 | 6 | 3 | 6 | **18** |
| Rams | 3 | 6 | 0 | 7 | **16** |

at SoFi Stadium, Inglewood, California

- Date: October 18
- Game time: 1:05 p.m. MST & PDT
- Game weather: Sunny, 86 °F (30 °C) (fixed roof)
- Game attendance: 72,573
- Referee: Clay Martin
- TV announcers (Fox): Kenny Albert, Greg Olsen, and Pam Oliver
- Recap, Game Book

Game information

**First quarter**

- LAR – Blake Grupe 44-yard field goal, 9:41. Rams 3–0. **Drive: 6 plays, 6 yards, 2:37.**
- ARI – Chad Ryland 34-yard field goal, 5:37. Tied 3–3. **Drive: 8 plays, 37 yards, 4:04.**

**Second quarter**

- ARI – Chad Ryland 30-yard field goal, 14:51. Cardinals 6–3. **Drive: 10 plays, 68 yards, 4:18.**
- LAR – Blake Corum 15-yard pass from Matthew Stafford (pass failed), 8:23. Rams 9–6. **Drive: 12 plays, 73 yards, 6:28.**
- ARI – Chad Ryland 22-yard field goal, 0:46. Tied 9–9. **Drive: 12 plays, 64 yards, 4:34.**

**Third quarter**

- ARI – Chad Ryland 38-yard field goal, 6:25. Cardinals 12–9. **Drive: 15 plays, 56 yards, 8:35.**

**Fourth quarter**

- ARI – Chad Ryland 27-yard field goal, 9:28. Cardinals 15–9. **Drive: 14 plays, 64 yards, 8:11.**
- LAR – Colby Parkinson 6-yard pass from Matthew Stafford (Ethan Evans kick), 0:47. Rams 16–15. **Drive: 8 plays, 86 yards, 2:01.**
- ARI – Chad Ryland 43-yard field goal, 0:00. Cardinals 18–16. **Drive: 5 plays, 40 yards, 0:47.**

**Top passers**

- ARI – Jacoby Brissett – 24/35, 218 yards, INT
- LAR – Matthew Stafford – 25/33, 222 yards, 2 TD

**Top rushers**

- ARI – Bam Knight – 15 rushes, 80 yards
- LAR – Kyren Williams – 10 rushes, 50 yards

**Top receivers**

- ARI – Trey McBride – 7 receptions, 53 yards
- LAR – Puka Nacua – 6 receptions, 80 yards

Despite failing to find the end zone, the Cardinals earned their first win over the Rams since 2024, and snapped their divisional losing streak.

==== Week 7: vs. Denver Broncos ====
Week 7: Denver Broncos at Arizona Cardinals – Game summary

| Quarter | 1 | 2 | 3 | 4 | Total |
|---|---|---|---|---|---|
| **Broncos** | 6 | 7 | 14 | 3 | **30** |
| Cardinals | 0 | 6 | 7 | 3 | **16** |

at State Farm Stadium, Glendale, Arizona

- Date: October 25
- Game time: 1:05 p.m. MST
- Game weather: None (retractable roof closed)
- Game attendance: 64,871
- Referee: Craig Wrolstad
- TV announcers (CBS): Kevin Harlan, Trent Green and Melanie Collins
- Recap, Game Book

Game information

**First quarter**

- DEN – Wil Lutz 48-yard field goal, 11:00. Broncos 3–0. **Drive: 8 plays, 29 yards, 4:00.**
- DEN – Wil Lutz 43-yard field goal, 1:08. Broncos 6–0. **Drive: 8 plays, 22 yards, 4:17.**

**Second quarter**

- ARI – Chad Ryland 30-yard field goal, 14:16. Broncos 6–3. **Drive: 5 plays, 60 yards, 1:52.**
- ARI – Chad Ryland 26-yard field goal, 4:30. Tied 6–6. **Drive: 14 plays, 65 yards, 7:55.**
- DEN – Bo Nix 62-yard run (Wil Lutz kick), 3:43. Broncos 13–6. **Drive: 2 plays, 65 yards, 0:47.**

**Third quarter**

- DEN – RJ Harvey 52-yard pass from Bo Nix (Wil Lutz kick), 10:26. Broncos 20–6. **Drive: 3 plays, 62 yards, 1:31.**
- ARI – Trey McBride 7-yard pass from Jacoby Brissett (Chad Ryland kick), 3:50. Broncos 20–13. **Drive: 10 plays, 68 yards, 6:36.**
- DEN – J. K. Dobbins 1-yard run (Wil Lutz kick), 0:00. Broncos 27–13. **Drive: 6 plays, 76 yards, 3:50.**

**Fourth quarter**

- DEN – Wil Lutz 31-yard field goal, 8:39. Broncos 30–13. **Drive: 10 plays, 53 yards, 4:11.**
- ARI – Chad Ryland 41-yard field goal, 6:21. Broncos 30–16. **Drive: 10 plays, 42 yards, 2:18.**

**Top passers**

- DEN – Bo Nix – 15/29, 222 yards, TD
- ARI – Jacoby Brissett – 27/48, 272 yards, TD

**Top rushers**

- DEN – Bo Nix – 7 rushes, 73 yards, TD
- ARI – Bam Knight – 7 rushes, 48 yards

**Top receivers**

- DEN – RJ Harvey – 2 receptions, 54 yards, TD
- ARI – Trey McBride – 10 receptions, 111 yards, TD

==== Week 8: at Dallas Cowboys ====
Week 8: Arizona Cardinals at Dallas Cowboys – Game summary

| Quarter | 1 | 2 | 3 | 4 | OT | Total |
|---|---|---|---|---|---|---|
| **Cardinals** | 0 | 3 | 7 | 20 | 3 | **33** |
| Cowboys | 7 | 7 | 3 | 13 | 0 | **30** |

at AT&T Stadium, Arlington, Texas

- Date: November 1
- Game time: 12:00 p.m. CST/11:00 a.m. MST
- Game weather: None (retractable roof closed)
- Game attendance: 90,763
- Referee: Ronald Torbert
- TV announcers (Fox): Joe Davis, Greg Olsen, and Pam Oliver
- Recap, Game Book

Game information

**First quarter**

- DAL – James Mitchell 0-yard fumble recovery (Brandon Aubrey kick), 2:33. Cowboys 7–0. **Drive: 2 plays, 5 yards, 0:33.**

**Second quarter**

- DAL – Ryan Flournoy 9-yard pass from Dak Prescott (Brandon Aubrey kick), 5:16. Cowboys 14–0. **Drive: 12 plays, 85 yards, 7:05.**
- ARI – Chad Ryland 37-yard field goal, 1:13. Cowboys 14–3. **Drive: 11 plays, 56 yards, 4:03.**

**Third quarter**

- DAL – Brandon Aubrey 31-yard field goal, 6:37. Cowboys 17–3. **Drive: 15 plays, 70 yards, 8:23.**
- ARI – Tyler Allgeier 63-yard run (Chad Ryland kick), 0:57. Cowboys 17–10. **Drive: 2 plays, 70 yards, 0:38.**

**Fourth quarter**

- DAL – Dak Prescott 5-yard run (Brandon Aubrey kick), 14:20. Cowboys 24–10. **Drive: 6 plays, 62 yards, 1:27.**
- ARI – Tyler Allgeier 5-yard pass from Gardner Minshew (Chad Ryland kick), 10:47. Cowboys 24–17. **Drive: 7 plays, 80 yards, 3:33.**
- DAL – Brandon Aubrey 35-yard field goal, 3:54. Cowboys 27–17. **Drive: 15 plays, 56 yards, 6:53.**
- ARI – Trey McBride 14-yard pass from Gardner Minshew (Chad Ryland kick), 2:11. Cowboys 27–24. **Drive: 6 plays, 58 yards, 1:43.**
- DAL – Brandon Aubrey 41-yard field goal, 1:14. Cowboys 30–24. **Drive: 4 plays, 57 yards, 0:57.**
- ARI – Michael Wilson 13-yard pass from Gardner Minshew (kick failed), 0:06. Tied 30–30. **Drive: 8 plays, 80 yards, 1:03.**

**Overtime**

- ARI – Chad Ryland 42-yard field goal, 2:53. Cardinals 33–30. **Drive: 8 plays, 44 yards, 4:09.**

**Top passers**

- ARI – Gardner Minshew – 17/23, 188 yards, 3 TD
- DAL – Dak Prescott – 19/29, 195 yards, 1 TD

**Top rushers**

- ARI – Tyler Allgeier – 11 rushes, 147 yards, TD
- DAL – Javonte Williams – 24 rushes, 56 yards

**Top receivers**

- ARI – Michael Wilson – 8 receptions, 111 yards, TD
- DAL – CeeDee Lamb – 7 receptions, 58 yards

Facing a 24–10 deficit in the fourth quarter, the Cardinals rallied behind backup quarterback Gardner Minshew's three touchdown drives, the last ending with a game-tying catch by Michael Wilson with six seconds left. However, kicker Chad Ryland missed the extra point, thus sending the game to overtime. After the offense stalled and went three-and-out on the opening drive, the defense stifled Dallas by forcing a three-and-out in return. Minshew then led the Cardinals down the field, where Ryland kicked the 42-yard game-winning field goal. Arizona won its fifth straight against Dallas dating back to 2017 and improved to 5–0 at AT&T Stadium.

==== Week 9: at Seattle Seahawks ====
Week 9: Arizona Cardinals at Seattle Seahawks – Game summary

| Quarter | 1 | 2 | 3 | 4 | Total |
|---|---|---|---|---|---|
| Cardinals | 3 | 0 | 0 | 0 | **3** |
| **Seahawks** | 0 | 14 | 3 | 0 | **17** |

at Lumen Field, Seattle, Washington

- Date: November 8
- Game time: 2:25 p.m. MST/1:25 p.m. PST
- Game weather: Cloudy, 56 °F (13 °C)
- Game attendance: 68,636
- Referee: Clete Blakeman
- TV announcers (Fox): Kenny Albert, Jonathan Vilma and Megan Olivi
- Recap, Game Book

Game information

**First quarter**

- ARI – Chad Ryland 28-yard field goal, 9:23. Cardinals 3–0. **Drive: 10 plays, 89 yards, 4:52.**

**Second quarter**

- SEA – AJ Barner 1-yard run (Jason Myers kick), 14:23. Seahawks 7–3. **Drive: 11 plays, 58 yards, 5:17.**
- SEA – AJ Barner 7-yard pass from Drew Lock (Jason Myers kick), 0:15. Seahawks 14–3. **Drive: 7 plays, 81 yards, 1:30.**

**Third quarter**

- SEA – Jason Myers 45-yard field goal, 3:50. Seahawks 17–3. **Drive: 11 plays, 57 yards, 7:35.**

**Fourth quarter**

- No scoring plays

**Top passers**

- ARI – Gardner Minshew – 21/30, 166 yards
- SEA – Drew Lock – 19/28, 175 yards, TD

**Top rushers**

- ARI – Tyler Allgeier – 17 rushes, 46 yards
- SEA – Zach Charbonnet – 16 rushes, 77 yards

**Top receivers**

- ARI – Michael Wilson – 6 receptions, 60 yards
- SEA – Jadarian Price – 4 receptions, 54 yards

==== Week 10: vs. Los Angeles Rams ====
Week 10: Los Angeles Rams at Arizona Cardinals – Game summary

| Quarter | 1 | 2 | 3 | 4 | Total |
|---|---|---|---|---|---|
| **Rams** | 3 | 14 | 14 | 3 | **34** |
| Cardinals | 6 | 0 | 0 | 0 | **6** |

at State Farm Stadium, Glendale, Arizona

- Date: November 15
- Game time: 2:05 p.m. MST
- Game weather: Sunny, 75 °F (24 °C) (retractable roof open)
- Game attendance: 60,926
- Referee: Land Clark
- TV announcers (CBS): Andrew Catalon, Logan Ryan, and AJ Ross
- Recap, Game Book

Game information

**First quarter**

- ARI – Chad Ryland 49-yard field goal, 10:48. Cardinals 3–0. **Drive: 8 plays, 36 yards, 4:12.**
- LAR – Brandon McManus 24-yard field goal, 5:22. Tied 3–3. **Drive: 11 plays, 50 yards, 5:26.**
- ARI – Chad Ryland 49-yard field goal, 2:11. Cardinals 6–3. **Drive: 6 plays, 35 yards, 3:11.**

**Second quarter**

- LAR – Tyler Higbee 5-yard pass from Matthew Stafford (Brandon McManus kick), 1:06. Rams 10–6. **Drive: 10 plays, 72 yards, 4:18.**
- LAR – Xavier Smith 22-yard pass from Matthew Stafford (Brandon McManus kick), 0:13. Rams 17–6. **Drive: 3 plays, 32 yards, 0:18.**

**Third quarter**

- LAR – Blake Corum 1-yard run (Brandon McManus kick), 10:17. Rams 24–6. **Drive: 8 plays, 78 yards, 4:43.**
- LAR – Davis Allen 19-yard pass from Matthew Stafford (Brandon McManus kick), 5:55. Rams 31–6. **Drive: 5 plays, 48 yards, 2:53.**

**Fourth quarter**

- LAR – Brandon McManus 43-yard field goal, 14:55. Rams 34–6. **Drive: 7 plays, 20 yards, 4:09.**

**Top passers**

- LAR – Matthew Stafford – 18/26, 249 yards, 3 TD, INT
- ARI – Carson Beck – 11/28, 108 yards, 2 INT

**Top rushers**

- LAR – Blake Corum – 17 rushes, 100 yards, TD
- ARI – Bam Knight – 5 rushes, 19 yards

**Top receivers**

- LAR – Konata Mumpfield – 3 receptions, 81 yards
- ARI – Trey McBride – 5 receptions, 37 yards

==== Week 11: at Kansas City Chiefs ====
Week 11: Arizona Cardinals at Kansas City Chiefs – Game summary

| Quarter | 1 | 2 | 3 | 4 | Total |
|---|---|---|---|---|---|
| Cardinals | 0 | 7 | 0 | 0 | **7** |
| **Chiefs** | 14 | 13 | 0 | 7 | **34** |

at Arrowhead Stadium, Kansas City, Missouri

- Date: November 22
- Game time: 12:00 p.m. MST/11:00 a.m. MST
- Game weather: Mostly sunny, 46 °F (8 °C)
- Game attendance: 73,511
- Referee: Brad Allen
- TV announcers (CBS): Ian Eagle, Ross Tucker, and Evan Washburn
- Recap, Game Book

Game information

**First quarter**

- KC – Travis Kelce 8-yard pass from Patrick Mahomes (Harrison Butker kick), 9:46. Chiefs 7–0. **Drive: 11 plays, 72 yards, 5:14.**
- KC – Emmett Johnson 3-yard rush (Harrison Butker kick), 0:48. Chiefs 14–0. **Drive: 16 plays, 80 yards, 7:22.**

**Second quarter**

- ARI – Simi Fehoko 2-yard pass from Josh Johnson (Chad Ryland kick), 9:48. Chiefs 14–7. **Drive: 10 plays, 63 yards, 6:00.**
- KC – Harrison Butker 40-yard field goal, 4:32. Chiefs 17–7. **Drive: 10 plays, 48 yards, 5:16.**
- KC – Travis Kelce 22-yard pass from Patrick Mahomes (Harrison Butker kick), 1:54. Chiefs 24–7. **Drive: 3 plays, 37 yards, 1:04.**
- KC – Harrison Butker 44-yard field goal, 0:00. Chiefs 27–7. **Drive: 11 plays, 48 yards, 1:10.**

**Third quarter**

- No scoring plays

**Fourth quarter**

- KC – Xavier Worthy 18-yard pass from Patrick Mahomes (Harrison Butker kick), 14:54. Chiefs 34–7. **Drive: 9 plays, 97 yards, 3:11.**

**Top passers**

- ARI – Josh Johnson – 18/31, 155 yards, TD
- KC – Patrick Mahomes – 27/39, 324 yards, 3 TD

**Top rushers**

- ARI – Bam Knight – 7 rushes, 35 yards
- KC – Emmett Johnson – 23 rushes, 105 yards, TD

**Top receivers**

- ARI – Harrison Wallace III – 4 receptions, 57 yards
- KC – Travis Kelce – 6 receptions, 74 yards, 2 TD

==== Week 12: vs. Washington Commanders ====
Week 12: Washington Commanders at Arizona Cardinals – Game summary

| Quarter | 1 | 2 | 3 | 4 | Total |
|---|---|---|---|---|---|
| Commanders | 0 | 0 | 0 | 0 | **0** |
| Cardinals | 0 | 0 | 0 | 0 | **0** |

at State Farm Stadium, Glendale, Arizona

- Date: November 29
- Game time: 2:25 p.m. MST
- Game weather: TBD (retractable roof stadium)
- TV: Fox
- Preview

=== Standings ===
==== Division ====
NFC West
| | W | L | T | PCT | DIV | CONF | PF | PA | STK |
|---|---|---|---|---|---|---|---|---|---|
| San Francisco 49ers | 8 | 1 | 0 | .889 | 3–0 | 5–1 | 281 | 196 | W2 |
| Seattle Seahawks | 6 | 4 | 0 | .600 | 2–1 | 2–3 | 223 | 175 | W2 |
| Los Angeles Rams | 6 | 4 | 0 | .600 | 1–2 | 4–2 | 248 | 187 | W4 |
| Arizona Cardinals | 3 | 8 | 0 | .273 | 1–4 | 2–6 | 191 | 323 | L3 |

==== Conference ====
NFC
| Seed | Team | Division | W | L | T | PCT | DIV | CONF | SOS | SOV | STK |
|---|---|---|---|---|---|---|---|---|---|---|---|
**Division leaders**
| 1 | San Francisco 49ers | West | 8 | 1 | 0 | .889 | 3–0 | 5–1 | .428 | .444 | W2 |
| 2 (Note: Detroit wins tie break over Chicago based on division record.) | Detroit Lions | North | 8 | 2 | 0 | .800 | 2–0 | 5–1 | .440 | .375 | W6 |
| 3 | New York Giants | East | 5 | 3 | 1 | .611 | 2–1–1 | 3–3–1 | .356 | .308 | L1 |
| 4 | Carolina Panthers | South | 5 | 5 | 0 | .500 | 2–1 | 4–3 | .510 | .412 | W2 |
**Wild cards**
| 5 | Chicago Bears | North | 8 | 2 | 0 | .800 | 0–2 | 6–2 | .434 | .375 | W5 |
| 6 | Minnesota Vikings | North | 7 | 2 | 0 | .778 | 3–1 | 5–1 | .516 | .423 | W1 |
| 7 (Note: Green Bay wins tie break over Seattle based on conference record. Division tie break was initially used to eliminate LA Rams (see below).) | Green Bay Packers | North | 6 | 4 | 0 | .600 | 1–3 | 4–4 | .535 | .459 | L1 |
**In the hunt**
| 8 (Note: Seattle wins tie break over LA Rams based on division record.) | Seattle Seahawks | West | 6 | 4 | 0 | .600 | 2–1 | 2–3 | .515 | .393 | W2 |
| 9 | Los Angeles Rams | West | 6 | 4 | 0 | .600 | 1–2 | 4–2 | .485 | .345 | W4 |
| 10 | Dallas Cowboys | East | 5 | 6 | 0 | .455 | 2–1 | 2–5 | .400 | .290 | W1 |
| 11 | Washington Commanders | East | 3 | 5 | 1 | .389 | 2–2–1 | 3–4–1 | .506 | .500 | W1 |
| 12 (Note: Tampa Bay wins tie break over Philadelphia based on conference record. Division tie break was initially to eliminate Atlanta and New Orleans (see below).) (Note: Tampa Bay wins tie break over Atlanta and New Orleans based on head-to-head record.) | Tampa Bay Buccaneers | South | 3 | 7 | 0 | .300 | 2–0 | 3–4 | .616 | .419 | L2 |
| 13 (Note: Atlanta wins tie break over Philadephia based on conference record. Division tie break was initially to eliminate New Orleans (see below).) (Note: Atlanta wins tie break over New Orleans based on head-to-head victory.) | Atlanta Falcons | South | 3 | 7 | 0 | .300 | 1–2 | 3–3 | .586 | .586 | L3 |
| 14 (Note: New Orleans wins tie break over Philadelphia based on conference record.) | New Orleans Saints | South | 3 | 7 | 0 | .300 | 0–2 | 1–5 | .571 | .517 | L2 |
| 15 | Philadelphia Eagles | East | 3 | 7 | 0 | .300 | 1–3 | 1–6 | .521 | .362 | W1 |
| 16 | Arizona Cardinals | West | 3 | 8 | 0 | .273 | 1–4 | 2–6 | .621 | .400 | L3 |
