= Jake Moreland =

American football player and coach (born 1977)

Arizona Cardinals
- Title: Tight ends coach

Personal information
- Born: January 18, 1977 (age 49); Milwaukee, Wisconsin, U.S.
- Listed height: 6 ft 3 in (1.91 m)
- Listed weight: 255 lb (116 kg)

Career information
- Position: Tight end
- High school: Milwaukee (WI) Marquette University
- College: Western Michigan
- NFL draft: 2000: undrafted

Career history

Playing
- New York Jets (2000–2001); Cleveland Browns (2001); Houston Texans (2002)*
- * Offseason or practice squad member only

Coaching
- Elmhurst (2003) Tight ends coach; Saint Joseph's (IN) (2004) Special teams coordinator & offensive assistant; Western Michigan (2005–2011) Tight ends coach; Air Force (2012–2014) Tight ends coach; Syracuse (2015) Offensive tackles coach & tight ends coach; Air Force (2016) Wide receivers coach; Western Michigan (2017) Co-offensive coordinator & offensive line coach; Western Michigan (2018–2019) Offensive coordinator & offensive line coach; Western Michigan (2020) Offensive coordinator & tight ends coach; New York Jets (2021) Assistant offensive line coach; Denver Broncos (2022) Tight ends coach; Houston Texans (2023–2025) Tight ends coach; Arizona Cardinals (2026–present) Tight ends coach

Awards and highlights
- First-team All-MAC (1998); Second-team All-MAC (1999)

Career NFL statistics
- Receptions: 3
- Receiving yards: 15
- Stats at Pro Football Reference

Jake Moreland (born January 18, 1977) is an American professional football coach and former tight end who is the tight ends coach for the Arizona Cardinals of the National Football League (NFL). He previously served as the tight ends coach for the Houston Texans from 2023 to 2025.

Moreland played college football at Western Michigan and signed as an undrafted free agent with the New York Jets in 2000. He was also a member for the Cleveland Browns and Houston Texans. Moreland's coaching career began in 2003 and he has previously served as an assistant coach for Elmhurst University, Saint Joseph's College (Indiana), Syracuse University, Air Force, Western Michigan University, New York Jets, Denver Broncos and Houston Texans.

== Playing career ==
Moreland was born on January 18, 1977, in Milwaukee, Wisconsin.

Pre-draft measurables
Height	Weight
6 ft 3 1/4 in (1.91 m)	240 lb (109 kg)
Values from Pro Day

Moreland went on to play two seasons in the NFL for the New York Jets (2000) and Cleveland Browns (2001), catching three passes for 15 yards. Moreland retired in 2002 shortly after signing with the Houston Texans.

== Coaching career ==
=== Early career ===
Moreland then started his coaching career by taking the tight end coach position at Elmhurst College, then Special Teams Coordinator at Saint Joseph's College, then went to Western Michigan.

=== New York Jets ===
In 2021, Moreland was hired by the New York Jets as their assistant offensive line coach under head coach Robert Saleh.

=== Denver Broncos ===
On February 14, 2022, Moreland was hired by the Denver Broncos as their tight ends coach under head coach Nathaniel Hackett. Moreland was not retained by the Broncos for 2023 after Sean Payton was hired as head coach.

=== Houston Texans ===
On February 21, 2023, Moreland was hired by the Houston Texans as their tight end coach under head coach DeMeco Ryans.

=== Arizona Cardinals ===
On February 20, 2026, Moreland was hired by the Arizona Cardinals to serve as the team's tight ends coach under new head coach Mike LaFleur.
