= Mike McDaniel =

American football coach (born 1983)

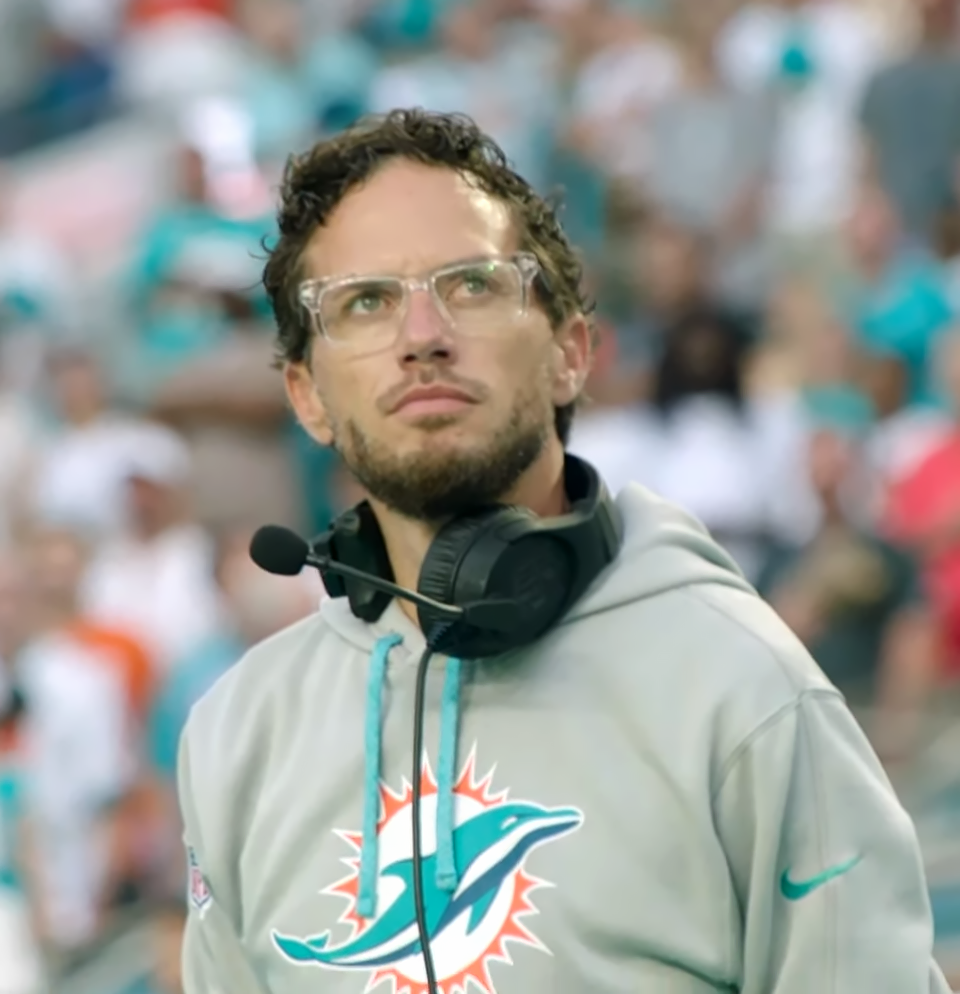
- McDaniel with the Miami Dolphins in 2023

Los Angeles Chargers
- Title: Offensive coordinator

Personal information
- Born: March 6, 1983 (age 43); Aurora, Colorado, U.S.
- Listed height: 5 ft 9 in (1.75 m)
- Listed weight: 175 lb (79 kg)

Career information
- Position: Wide receiver
- High school: Smoky Hill (Aurora)
- College: Yale (2001–2004)

Career history
- Denver Broncos (2005) Coaching intern; Houston Texans (2006–2008) Offensive assistant; California Redwoods / Sacramento Mountain Lions (2009–2010) Running backs coach; Washington Redskins (2011–2013); Offensive assistant (2011–2012); Wide receivers coach (2013); Cleveland Browns (2014) Wide receivers coach; Atlanta Falcons (2015–2016) Offensive assistant; San Francisco 49ers (2017–2021); Run game specialist (2017); Run game coordinator (2018–2020); Offensive coordinator (2021); Miami Dolphins (2022–2025) Head coach; Los Angeles Chargers (2026–present) Offensive coordinator

Head coaching record
- Regular season: 35–33 (.515)
- Postseason: 0–2 (.000)
- Career: 35–35 (.500)
- Coaching profile at Pro Football Reference

Michael Lee McDaniel (born March 6, 1983) is an American professional football coach who is the offensive coordinator for the Los Angeles Chargers of the National Football League (NFL). He began his NFL coaching career as an intern for the Denver Broncos in 2005. McDaniel served as an assistant coach for the Houston Texans, Washington Redskins, Cleveland Browns, Atlanta Falcons, and San Francisco 49ers from 2017 to 2021, holding his first offensive coordinator position in 2021. McDaniel appeared in Super Bowl LI with the Falcons in 2017 and Super Bowl LIV with the 49ers in 2020. He was hired by the Miami Dolphins as their head coach on February 6, 2022. McDaniel was fired by the Dolphins on January 8, 2026, after four seasons.

== Personal life ==
McDaniel was born in Aurora, Colorado, in 1983. He graduated from Smoky Hill High School in 2001. He played college football as a wide receiver at Yale, where he graduated with a degree in history.

McDaniel is biracial. His mother is white and his father is black. McDaniel grew up close friends with comedian Dan Soder in Aurora, Colorado. McDaniel's relationship to the NFL began when, as a child seeking autographs at the Broncos' training camp at the University of Northern Colorado, he lost his Charlotte Hornets ball cap. After Broncos staffer Gary McCune bought him a replacement, McCune met and married McDaniel's mother.

McDaniel is outspoken about his battles with alcoholism and credits then Atlanta Falcons head coach Dan Quinn with helping him seek treatment. He has been sober since 2016.

McDaniel and his wife Katie have one daughter.

== Coaching career ==
=== Denver Broncos ===
McDaniel was hired in 2005 at the age of 22 by his hometown Denver Broncos as a coaching intern under head coach Mike Shanahan. The Broncos in 2005 finished with what was at the time their best record since John Elway's retirement six years earlier, at 13–3. In the postseason, they defeated the defending back-to-back Super Bowl champion New England Patriots 27–13 in the Divisional Round before falling to the eventual Super Bowl champion Pittsburgh Steelers 34–17 in the AFC Championship Game.

=== Houston Texans ===
In 2006, McDaniel was hired by the Houston Texans as an offensive assistant under head coach Gary Kubiak, whom McDaniel worked alongside at the Denver Broncos a season earlier. During his tenure in Houston, McDaniel assisted three different offensive coordinators and future head coaches; Troy Calhoun, Mike Sherman, and Kyle Shanahan.

=== California Redwoods / Sacramento Mountain Lions ===
In 2009, McDaniel was hired by the California Redwoods, a team from the now-defunct United Football League as a running backs coach under former Minnesota Vikings and Arizona Cardinals head coach Dennis Green. In McDaniel's second year, the team relocated to Sacramento and was renamed the Sacramento Mountain Lions.

=== Washington Redskins ===
In 2011, McDaniel was hired by the Washington Redskins as an offensive assistant, reuniting with Redskins head coach Mike Shanahan, who was McDaniel's mentor six seasons earlier on the Denver Broncos. It was there where McDaniel worked alongside three other future head coaches: Kyle Shanahan, Sean McVay, and Matt LaFleur. In 2013, McDaniel was promoted to wide receivers coach following the departure of Ike Hilliard, who left to join the Buffalo Bills in the same position. McDaniel would not be retained under new head coach Jay Gruden.

=== Cleveland Browns ===
McDaniel was hired in 2014 by the Cleveland Browns as their wide receivers coach under new head coach Mike Pettine.

=== Atlanta Falcons ===
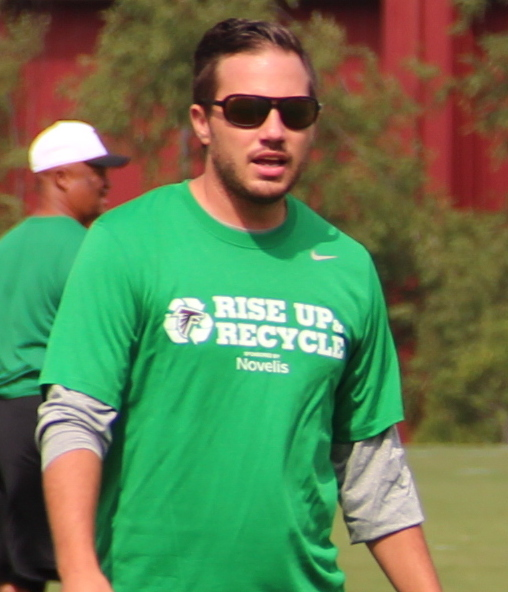
McDaniel as an assistant coach with the Atlanta Falcons, 2015

McDaniel was hired by the Atlanta Falcons as an offensive assistant coach under new head coach Dan Quinn in 2015.

=== San Francisco 49ers ===
In 2017, McDaniel was hired by the San Francisco 49ers as their run game specialist under his long-time associate and new head coach Kyle Shanahan, whom he worked alongside for a total of nine seasons on the Texans, Redskins, Browns, and Falcons. After the 2017 season, he was promoted to run game coordinator, a title he held for three seasons. During the 2019 season, McDaniel and the Niners appeared in Super Bowl LIV, where they lost to the Kansas City Chiefs 31–20. On January 18, 2021, McDaniel was promoted to offensive coordinator, following the departure of passing game coordinator Mike LaFleur, who left to become the offensive coordinator for the New York Jets.

=== Miami Dolphins ===
==== 2022 season ====
The Miami Dolphins hired McDaniel as their fourteenth head coach on February 6, 2022. On September 11, 2022, McDaniel made his regular season head coaching debut against the New England Patriots and led the Dolphins to a 20–7 victory, marking McDaniel's first victory as a head coach. McDaniel became the first Dolphins head coach since Nick Saban in 2005 to win his first game as Miami's head coach, and the first in franchise history to win a season opener as a rookie head coach. McDaniel also helped the Dolphins defeat the Buffalo Bills for the first time since the 2018 season.

McDaniel led the Dolphins to a 9–8 record, giving Miami their first playoff berth since 2016. The Dolphins fell to the Buffalo Bills 34–31 despite a late rally in the fourth quarter of the Wild Card Round.

==== 2023 season ====
McDaniel led the Dolphins to a historic 70–20 victory over the Denver Broncos in Week 3 of the 2023 season, the first time a team scored 70 or more points in the Super Bowl era. The team recorded an NFL-record 726 offensive yards, the first to record 700 or more yards since 1951.

In Week 14, the Dolphins had a 27–13 lead over Tennessee with 4:34 to go in the game before they gave up two touchdowns that saw them become the first team since 1976 to blow a lead of at least 14 points in the final three minutes in regulation. With a win over the Dallas Cowboys in Week 16, they clinched a playoff spot for a second consecutive season, making it the first time since the 1997-2001 run that they had reached the playoffs in consecutive seasons. They had a lead over the Buffalo Bills by three games with five to play for what would've been their first AFC East title since 2008 but the Dolphins and Bills ended up at 11–5 heading into the final week of the season where they would play each other in Miami for the division title. Despite leading 14–7 at halftime, the Bills scored 14 unanswered points in the 4th quarter to prevail 21–14 to win the division title. Miami went 1-5 against teams that finished with a winning record. The team lost to the eventual Super Bowl champion Kansas City Chiefs 26–7 in the Wild Card Round.

==== 2024 season ====
The Dolphins finished with an 8–9 record in 2024, missing the playoffs for the first time in McDaniel's head coaching tenure. The Miami defense finished 4th in fewest yards allowed, but starting quarterback Tua Tagovailoa missed six games and the Dolphins’ offense struggled without its top passer. Hours after a 32–20 loss to the New York Jets knocked them out of the playoff chase on the season's final weekend, Dolphins owner Stephen Ross announced after Sunday’s game that the Dolphins would continue to be led by general manager Chris Grier and Coach McDaniel "with (his) full support."

==== 2025 season ====
The Dolphins began the 2025 season 1–6, before finishing 7–10. Despite initially being included as a consultant for the GM search, McDaniel was fired on January 8, 2026, following the conclusion of the season.

=== Los Angeles Chargers ===
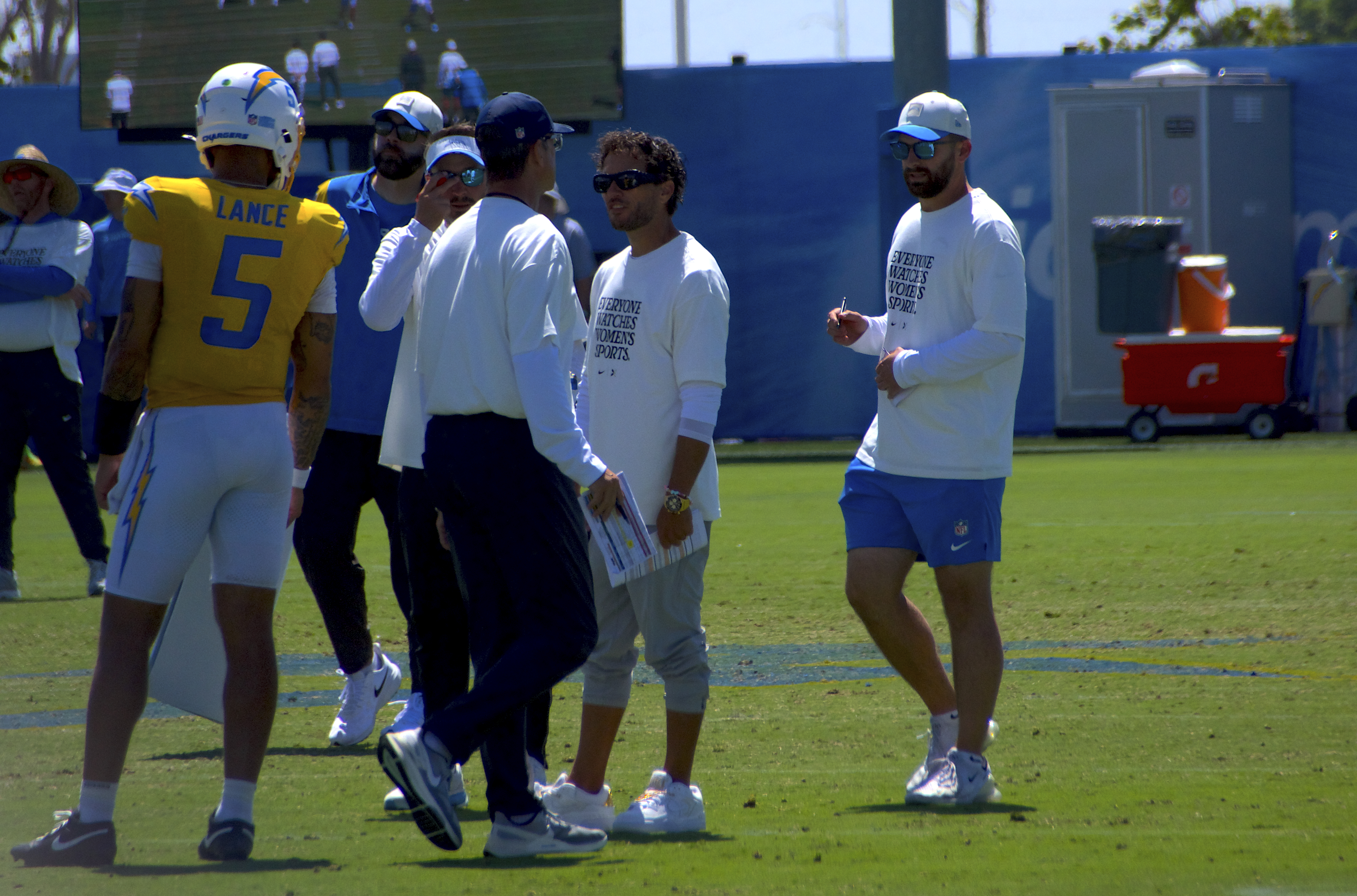
McDaniel (center) at the 2026 Chargers training camp with coach Jim Harbaugh and Trey Lance (far left)

On January 26, 2026, the Los Angeles Chargers hired McDaniel as their offensive coordinator under head coach Jim Harbaugh.

== Head coaching record ==
Team	Year	Regular season					Postseason			
Team	Year	Won	Lost	Ties	Win %	Finish	Won	Lost	Win %	Result
MIA	2022	9	8	0	.529	2nd in AFC East	0	1	.000	Lost to Buffalo Bills in AFC Wild Card Game
MIA	2023	11	6	0	.647	2nd in AFC East	0	1	.000	Lost to Kansas City Chiefs in AFC Wild Card Game
MIA	2024	8	9	0	.471	2nd in AFC East	—	—	—	—
MIA	2025	7	10	0	.438	3rd in AFC East	—	—	—	—
Total		35	33	0	.524		0	2	.000	
