= Nick Rallis =

American football coach (born 1993)

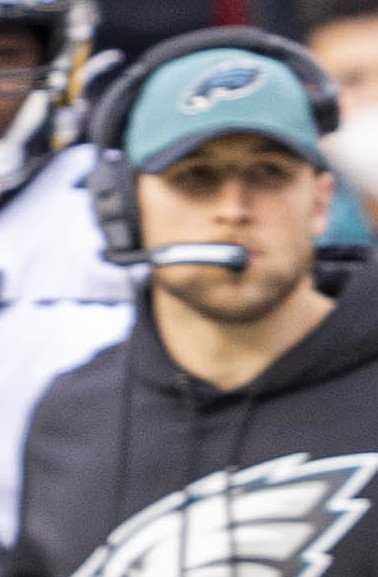
- Rallis with the Philadelphia Eagles in 2022

Arizona Cardinals
- Title: Defensive coordinator

Personal information
- Born: July 13, 1993 (age 33); Minneapolis, Minnesota, U.S.

Career information
- Position: Linebacker
- High school: Edina (MN)
- College: Minnesota

Career history
- Wake Forest (2017) Quality control coach; Minnesota Vikings (2018–2019) Defensive quality control coach; Minnesota Vikings (2020) Defensive quality control coach & assistant linebackers coach; Philadelphia Eagles (2021–2022) Linebackers coach; Arizona Cardinals (2023–present) Defensive coordinator
- Coaching profile at Pro Football Reference

Nicholas John Rallis (born July 13, 1993) is an American professional football coach who is the defensive coordinator for the Arizona Cardinals of the National Football League (NFL). He played college football at Minnesota and previously served as an assistant coach for the Minnesota Vikings and Philadelphia Eagles.

== Early life and education ==
Rallis was born on July 13, 1993, in Minneapolis, Minnesota. He attended Edina High School, being rated No. 8 in Minnesota by Rivals.com at the time of his graduation. As a sophomore, he recorded 81 tackles, one interception, and one sack, being named honorable mention all-Lake Conference. He played on both offense and defense during his junior year of high school, carrying the ball 54 times for 251 yards with five touchdowns on offense, and 72 tackles, 57 solo, on defense. He was named third-team all-metro by the Star-Tribune following the season. He tallied 13 tackles in his senior season before missing the rest due to an injury.

After his graduation from high school, Rallis played college football at University of Minnesota. He spent his first season, 2012, as a redshirt before appearing in ten games the following year. In 2013 he recorded seven tackles and was named Academic All-Big Ten. Rallis made his debut against UNLV, where he made three tackles. In his sophomore year, he played against Eastern Illinois, making three tackles, before suffering a season-ending injury against Middle Tennessee. As a junior in 2015, Rallis appeared in 13 games and made 18 tackles, including three for loss. He recorded a career-high nine tackles against Wisconsin. In his senior season, he appeared in 11 games, starting three, and made 37 tackles, 6.5 for loss and his first career sack. Against Wisconsin he led the team with 3 tackles for loss and recorded his only career sack against Washington State.

== Coaching career ==
=== Early career ===
Rather than pursue a professional football career, Rallis accepted an offer by Wake Forest University as a quality control coach and graduate assistant. He spent one season at Wake Forest before being hired professionally by the Minnesota Vikings of the National Football League (NFL).

=== Minnesota Vikings ===
Rallis was originally hired by the Vikings to work with computer breakdowns and opponent scouting but quickly moved up to the position of defensive quality control coach. He was also given the position of assistant linebackers coach in 2020.

=== Philadelphia Eagles ===
In 2021, he was hired by the Philadelphia Eagles to be their linebackers coach, making him the youngest position coach in the NFL. Rallis helped the Eagles reach the Super Bowl in 2022, while producing one of the best linebacking trios in the league in Hassan Reddick, Kyzir White, and T. J. Edwards.

=== Arizona Cardinals ===
Rallis was hired as the defensive coordinator for the Arizona Cardinals on February 18, 2023, making him the youngest coordinator in the NFL. The move reunited him with head coach Jonathan Gannon, who served as the defensive coordinator of the Philadelphia Eagles during Rallis' tenure there.

On February 13, 2026, Rallis was retained by the Arizona Cardinals as their defensive coordinator under head coach Mike LaFleur.

== Personal life ==
His brother Mike Rallis, is a professional wrestler better known by his ring name Riddick Moss.
