= Matt Merritt =

American football player and coach (born 1988)

Arizona Cardinals
- Title: Running backs coach

Personal information
- Born: Germany

Career information
- Position: Running back
- High school: Indian Hill (Cincinnati, Ohio, U.S.)
- College: Capital (2006–2009)

Career history
- Capital University (2010) Graduate assistant; St. Charles Preparatory (2011–2012) Running backs coach & special teams coordinator; Ohio State (2013–2015) Graduate assistant; Ohio Dominican University (2016) Running backs coach & special teams coordinator; Elon (2017–2018) Running backs coach & special teams coordinator; James Madison (2019–2020) Running backs coach; Tennessee (2021) Senior offensive analyst; Georgia Southern (2022) Running backs coach; South Florida (2023) Associate head coach, run game coordinator & running backs coach; Miami (2024–2025) Running backs coach; Arizona Cardinals (2026–present) Running backs coach

Matt Merritt (born January 5, 1988) is an American professional football coach who is the running backs coach for the Arizona Cardinals of the National Football League (NFL). He previously served as the running backs coach at the University of Miami from 2024 to 2025.

Merritt played college football at Capital University as a running back from 2006 to 2009 and he previously served as an assistant coach at the University of Miami, University of South Florida, Georgia Southern University, University of Tennessee, James Madison University, Elon University, Ohio Dominican University, Ohio State University and Capital University.

== Early life ==
Merritt was born in Lich, Germany, where he lived in the town of Dorn-Assenheim until the age of 11. His father is a native of Detroit, Michigan, and his mother is from Monrovia, Liberia. Merritt and his mom later moved to Belgium, where Merritt attended the International School of Brussels from 1999 to 2004. At age 16, Merritt moved to Cincinnati, Ohio, and finished his education at Indian Hill High School, graduating in 2006. During his time in Belgium, he played for the Raiders American football team and won a championship title in 2002.

=== College ===
Merritt played running back and wide receiver at Capital University from 2006 to 2009, recording 1,099 career rushing yards and 12 touchdowns. He contributed to two NCAA Division III playoff appearances, including 542 rushing yards in 2007.He earned a Bachelor of Arts in education from Capital in 2010. He later obtained dual master's degrees in 2016 from Ohio State University (Sport Management) and Ohio University (Coaching Education).

== Coaching career ==
=== Early career ===
Early collegiate and high school roles Merritt began coaching as a graduate assistant at Capital University in 2010. He then spent two seasons as a running backs coach and special teams coordinator at St. Charles Preparatory School (2011–2012).

=== Ohio State ===
From 2013 to 2015, Merritt served as an offensive graduate assistant and assistant running backs coach at Ohio State. During this time, the Buckeyes secured the 2015 National Championship and the 2016 Fiesta Bowl, and Merritt helped develop players like Ezekiel Elliott, Curtis Samuel, Carlos Hyde and assisted Braxton Miller in his transition from Quarterback to Wide Receiver.

=== Ohio Dominican ===
In 2016, he was the running backs coach and special teams coordinator at Ohio Dominican.

=== Elon ===
Merritt established himself as a key offensive assistant while working under Curt Cignetti at two different programs. He first served as Cignetti's running backs coach and special teams coordinator at Elon from 2017 to 2018, where the Phoenix earned back-to-back FCS playoff berths.

=== James Madison ===
He then followed Cignetti to James Madison University (JMU) in 2019. During his time at JMU, Merritt's rushing unit contributed to a season that culminated in an appearance in the 2019 FCS National Championship game.

=== Tennessee ===
In 2020, the postponement of the NCAA FCS season to spring 2021 due to the COVID-19 pandemic led Merritt to depart James Madison. He had originally accepted the running backs coach position at UCF under Josh Heupel; however, when Heupel was subsequently hired as the head coach at Tennessee. Merritt ultimately joined Heupel in Knoxville as a senior offensive analyst for the 2021 season.

=== Georgia Southern ===
Merritt spent the 2022 college football season as the running backs coach at Georgia Southern, where he helped a Georgia Southern offense ranked No. 19 in FBS in total offense (468.6 ypg) and No. 30 in points (33.67 ppg).

=== USF ===
Merritt was hired by Alex Golesh at USF for the 2023 season. Serving as the Associate Head Coach and running backs coach, he oversaw a rushing attack that averaged over 182 yards per game, ranking near the top of the American Athletic Conference.

=== Miami ===
In 2024, Merritt joined Mario Cristobal's staff at the University of Miami. During the 2025 season, Merritt was instrumental in coaching a Hurricanes offense that ranked first nationally in total yards and points, leading the team to a 13–3 record and an appearance in the 2025 College Football Playoff National Championship game. He coached at Miami from 2024 to 2025, where Mark Fletcher recorded 1,192 yards and 12 touchdowns in 2025.

=== Arizona Cardinals ===
On February 5, 2026, Merritt was hired by the Arizona Cardinals as their running backs coach under head coach Mike LaFleur. This marks Merritt's first full-time NFL coaching job, after previously doing two NFL coaching fellowships: in 2016 with the Cincinnati Bengals and in 2019 with the San Francisco 49ers, where he crossed paths with LaFleur.

== Personal life ==
His father is from Detroit, Michigan, and his mother is from Liberia. Merritt is fluent in German and French.
