= Nathaniel Hackett =

American football coach (born 1979)

Arizona Cardinals
- Title: Offensive coordinator

Personal information
- Born: December 19, 1979 (age 46); Fullerton, California, U.S.

Career information
- Position: Linebacker
- High school: Blue Valley Northwest
- College: UC Davis (1999–2002)

Career history
- Stanford (2003) Offensive assistant; Stanford (2004) Offensive & defensive assistant to the coordinators; Stanford (2005) Recruiting coordinator & specialists; Tampa Bay Buccaneers (2006–2007) Offensive quality control coach; Buffalo Bills (2008–2009) Offensive quality control coach; Syracuse (2010) Passing game coordinator, quarterbacks coach & tight ends coach; Syracuse (2011–2012) Offensive coordinator, quarterbacks coach & tight ends coach; Buffalo Bills (2013–2014) Offensive coordinator; Jacksonville Jaguars (2015) Quarterbacks coach; Jacksonville Jaguars (2016–2018) Offensive coordinator; Green Bay Packers (2019–2021) Offensive coordinator; Denver Broncos (2022) Head coach; New York Jets (2023–2024) Offensive coordinator; Green Bay Packers (2025) Defensive analyst; Arizona Cardinals (2026–present) Offensive coordinator

Head coaching record
- Regular season: 4–11 (.267)
- Coaching profile at Pro Football Reference

Nathaniel Hackett (born December 19, 1979) is an American professional football coach who is the offensive coordinator for the Arizona Cardinals of the National Football League (NFL). A former assistant to Doug Marrone, Hackett previously served as the offensive coordinator for the Green Bay Packers, New York Jets, Jacksonville Jaguars, and Buffalo Bills. Hackett additionally served as the head coach of the Denver Broncos in 2022, but was fired during the season after leading the team to a 4–11 record. He held several positions for the Syracuse Orange in college football from 2010 to 2012.

== Coaching career ==
=== Early career ===
After working as an assistant coach for UC Davis and Stanford, Hackett began his NFL career as a quality coach under Jon Gruden with the Tampa Bay Buccaneers in 2006. He served there for two years before moving to the Buffalo Bills in that same role for the 2008 and 2009 seasons. Hackett worked with quarterbacks such as Bruce Gradkowski, Chris Simms, Jeff Garcia, Ryan Fitzpatrick, and Brian Brohm during those years.

In 2010, Hackett was hired by Syracuse as their quarterbacks and tight ends coach under Doug Marrone, who he would later follow to Buffalo and Jacksonville. Hackett was promoted to offensive coordinator the following year.

=== Buffalo Bills ===
In 2013, the Bills hired Marrone as their head coach, and Hackett was brought back to Buffalo as the offensive coordinator. With quarterbacks EJ Manuel, Thad Lewis, and Jeff Tuel, the Bills ranked 29th in passing offense that year, but had a prolific running game with halfbacks C. J. Spiller and Fred Jackson. When Kyle Orton took over for Manuel as the Bills' quarterback the following year, the team finished with a more respectable passing offense, but the run game suffered.

=== Jacksonville Jaguars ===
Marrone opted out of his contract with the Bills following the 2014 season, and was then hired by the Jacksonville Jaguars as an offensive line and assistant head coach, bringing Hackett with him once again.

In 2016, after Marrone was promoted to interim head coach after the firing of Gus Bradley, Hackett was upgraded from quarterbacks coach to interim offensive coordinator after the Jaguars also fired their previous offensive coordinator, Greg Olson. Hackett was confirmed on that position in January 2017.

Working with quarterback Blake Bortles and running back Leonard Fournette, Hackett coordinated the league's best rushing attack in 2017, leading to Jacksonville winning the AFC South and appearing in the AFC Championship Game. However, after the Jaguars failed to repeat their success the following year and started 3–8, Hackett was fired on November 26, 2018, a move that surprised him.

=== Green Bay Packers (first stint) ===
On January 14, 2019, Hackett was hired by the Green Bay Packers as their offensive coordinator under head coach Matt LaFleur. Hackett, alongside star quarterback Aaron Rodgers, led the Packers to becoming the league's best scoring offense in the 2020 season. Rodgers won back-to-back MVP awards (2020, 2021) with Hackett.

=== Denver Broncos ===
On January 27, 2022, Hackett was hired to become the head coach of the Denver Broncos after the team had parted ways with their former head coach Vic Fangio. In his first game as head coach, the Denver Broncos played a week 1 game against the Seattle Seahawks. Hackett came under scrutiny when the Broncos faced a 4th and 5 at midfield with over a minute left to play in the fourth quarter. Despite having three timeouts, Hackett decided to let the clock run down to 20 seconds left for a chance at a game-winning 64-yard field goal. The kick by Brandon McManus was wide left as the Broncos narrowly lost 17–16. The next day, Hackett expressed regret in his decision, stating, "Looking back at it, we definitely should have gone for it."

Hackett was again criticized for his clock management in the Broncos' Week 2 matchup against the Houston Texans, a game that Denver would go on to win 16–9. The Broncos subsequently hired Jerry Rosburg to serve as an assistant to Hackett to help him with game and clock management, beginning with their Week 3 matchup against the San Francisco 49ers. On November 20, Hackett ceded play-calling duties to quarterbacks coach Klint Kubiak.

On December 26, 2022, with the Broncos sitting at 4–11 following a 51–14 Christmas Day loss to the Los Angeles Rams, Hackett was fired by the Broncos and was replaced by Jerry Rosburg for the last two games of the season. Hackett became the fifth head coach since the AFL–NFL merger in 1970 to not finish his first season after Lou Holtz in 1976, Pete McCulley in 1978, Bobby Petrino in 2007, and Urban Meyer in 2021. A variety of pundits called Hackett's tenure as Denver's head coach among the worst in team and league history, including his successor Sean Payton who later apologized for his comments.

=== New York Jets ===
On January 28, 2023, the New York Jets announced they had hired Hackett as their new offensive coordinator in the wake of Mike LaFleur's firing.

After the firing of head coach Robert Saleh and a 2–3 start to the Jets' 2024 season, interim head coach Jeff Ulbrich stripped Hackett of play-calling duties.

Hackett was reported to no longer be part of the organization after the 2024 season ended.

=== Green Bay Packers (second stint) ===
On July 24, 2025, Packers head coach Matt LaFleur announced that Hackett had joined the coaching staff in a defensive analyst role.

=== Arizona Cardinals ===
On January 29, 2026, Hackett was hired to serve as the quarterbacks coach for the Miami Dolphins under new head coach Jeff Hafley. However, on February 13, 2026, Hackett was hired by the Arizona Cardinals as their offensive coordinator under head coach Mike LaFleur.

== Head coaching record ==
Team	Year	Regular season					Postseason			
Team	Year	Won	Lost	Ties	Win %	Finish	Won	Lost	Win %	Result
DEN	2022	4	11	0	.267	Fired	—	—	—	—
Total		4	11	0	.267		0	0	.000	

== Personal life ==
Hackett is the son of former college football and NFL coach Paul Hackett.
