= Kyle Shanahan =

American football coach (born 1979)

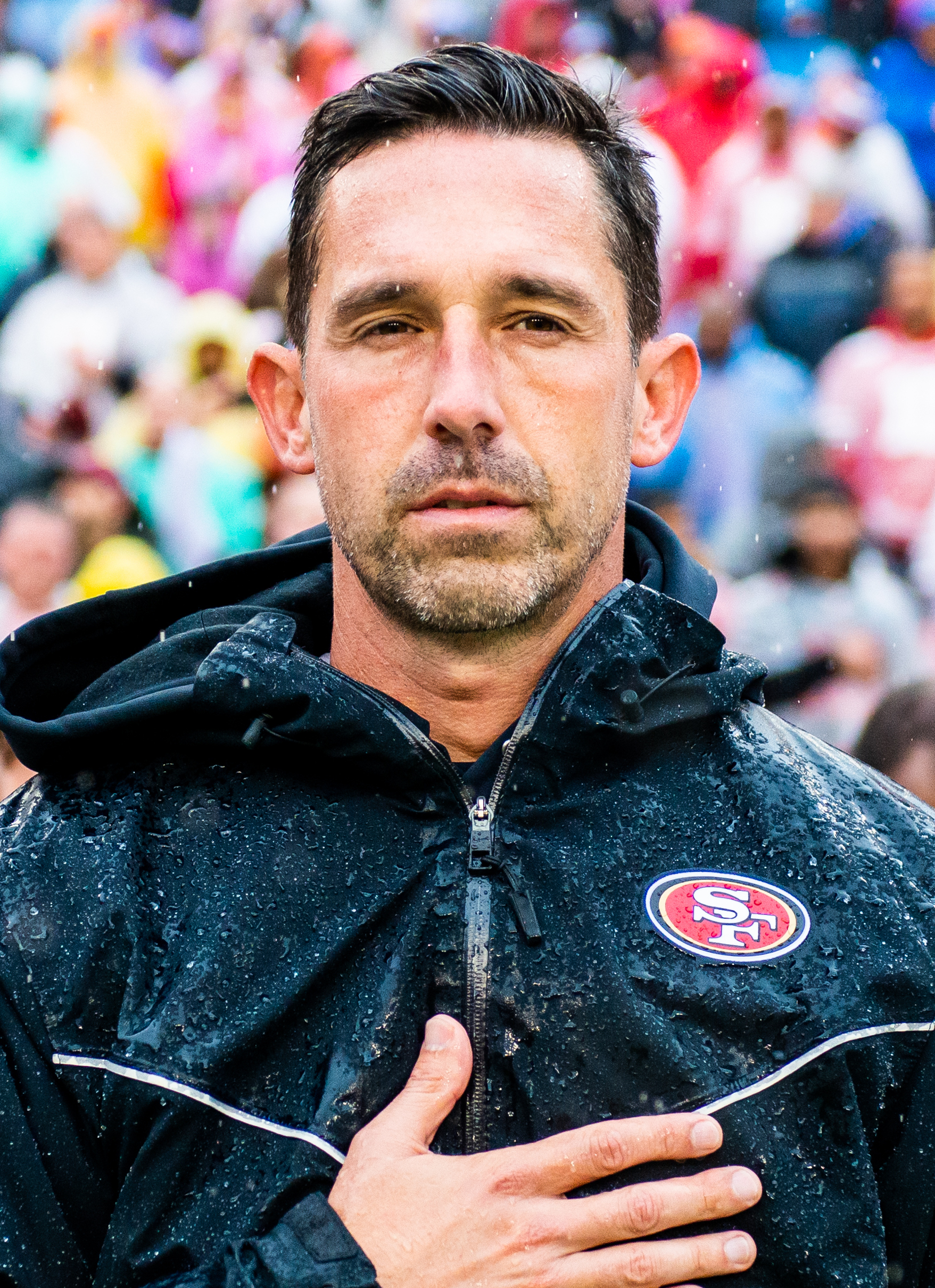
- Shanahan with the San Francisco 49ers in 2019

San Francisco 49ers
- Title: Head coach

Personal information
- Born: December 14, 1979 (age 46); Minneapolis, Minnesota, U.S.
- Listed height: 6 ft 1 in (1.85 m)
- Listed weight: 181 lb (82 kg)

Career information
- Position: Wide receiver
- High school: Saratoga (Saratoga, California)
- College: Duke (1998); Texas (1999–2002)

Career history
- UCLA (2003) Graduate assistant; Tampa Bay Buccaneers (2004–2005) Offensive quality control coach; Houston Texans (2006–2009); Wide receivers coach (2006); Quarterbacks coach (2007); Offensive coordinator (2008–2009); Washington Redskins (2010–2013) Offensive coordinator; Cleveland Browns (2014) Offensive coordinator; Atlanta Falcons (2015–2016) Offensive coordinator; San Francisco 49ers (2017–present) Head coach

Awards and highlights
- As an assistant coach: AP NFL Assistant Coach of the Year (2016); As a head coach: The Sporting News Coach of the Year (2019)

Head coaching record
- Regular season: 90–68 (.570)
- Postseason: 9–5 (.643)
- Career: 99–73 (.576)
- Coaching profile at Pro Football Reference

Kyle Michael Shanahan (born December 14, 1979) is an American professional football coach who is the head coach of the San Francisco 49ers of the National Football League (NFL). He came to prominence as the offensive coordinator for the Atlanta Falcons, whose offense in 2016 led the league in points scored and helped the team reach Super Bowl LI. Shanahan became the head coach of the 49ers the following season, who he has led to three division titles, five postseason appearances, four NFC Championship Game appearances, and two Super Bowl appearances (LIV and LVIII).

== Early life ==
Shanahan was born in Minneapolis, where his father, Mike Shanahan, was the offensive coordinator at the University of Minnesota. He attended Saratoga High School in Saratoga, California, in 1994, while his father worked as offensive coordinator for the San Francisco 49ers. Shanahan later attended Cherry Creek High School in Greenwood Village, Colorado, while his father served as head coach of the Denver Broncos.

Shanahan accepted a scholarship offer by Carl Franks of Duke University, but chose to transfer as a redshirt freshman to the University of Texas at Austin where he started out as a walk-on. Shanahan played wide receiver on a Longhorn team that featured future college coach Major Applewhite, future NFL assistant coach Richard Hightower (who worked with him in San Francisco) as well as future NFL players Roy Williams, Cedric Benson, Bo Scaife, Mike Williams, Quentin Jammer, and Chris Simms. Shanahan caught 14 passes for 127 yards in his career for the University of Texas at Austin.

Pre-draft measurables
Height	Weight
6 ft 1 1/4 in (1.86 m)	181 lb (82 kg)
Values from Pro Day

== Coaching career ==
=== Early years ===
I studied every potential Xs and Os play and issue possible. I spent my whole life working on that. My goal was that any question a player could have about anything on the field, I'd be able to answer it.

— Kyle Shanahan, 2006

Shortly after graduating from Texas in 2003, Shanahan became a graduate assistant to Karl Dorrell at UCLA. As a graduate assistant, he worked with players like Maurice Jones-Drew, Marcedes Lewis, and Drew Olson. However, Shanahan still had to take classes and could not spend all his time on football.

Shanahan was hired as assistant coach for offensive quality control under head coach Jon Gruden with the Tampa Bay Buccaneers in 2004. As a quality control coach, Shanahan helped break down game film and drew diagrams of plays for the playbook. He has said that his time spent using the computer program SuperPaint to draw up plays for Gruden introduced him to many plays used in the NFL.

=== Houston Texans (2006–2009) ===
In 2006, Shanahan was hired by Gary Kubiak to serve as the wide receivers coach for the Houston Texans. Kubiak had previously served as offensive coordinator under Mike Shanahan with the Broncos. At the time, Kyle Shanahan was the youngest position coach in the NFL. The following season, Shanahan became the Texans' quarterbacks coach. In 2007, he had also been offered to become offensive coordinator at the University of Minnesota, where former Broncos assistant Tim Brewster just became head coach. Shanahan declined, citing his decision to be an NFL coach. Shanahan was immediately considered the frontrunner for the vacant offensive coordinator position after Mike Sherman had left the Texans to take over as head coach at Texas A&M University.

On January 11, 2008, Shanahan was officially promoted, becoming the youngest coordinator in the NFL, being more than three years younger than Josh McDaniels of the New England Patriots. Despite his lack of experience, Shanahan found near instant success overseeing an NFL offense. The Texans finished their 2008 season third in yards per game. This reflected the individual success of his top offensive players that year. The Texans' starting quarterback Matt Schaub led the league in passing yards, and wide receiver Andre Johnson led the league in receiving yards.

=== Washington Redskins (2010–2013) ===
In 2010, Shanahan left the Texans to join his father, Mike, with the Washington Redskins. The Redskins' performance during his tenure led some to question whether Shanahan's hiring was an example of unearned nepotism. Washington struggled under Shanahan, failing to post a winning record in three seasons of the four seasons he was on staff. According to Shanahan, this poor performance helped him learn about the need to adjust his playbook when switching to a new team. Despite the overall team performance, the scheme and offense that Shanahan implemented during his time at Washington, especially his use of read option plays, was very highly regarded in the NFL. His future head coach at the Cleveland Browns, Mike Pettine, once said that Shanahan's offenses were some of the hardest to prepare for from the defensive side of the ball.

Conflict over how to manage the offense for star rookie quarterback, Robert Griffin III, dominated Shanahan's tenure with Washington. In the 2012 NFL Draft, Washington courted controversy by selecting two players at the quarterback position: Robert Griffin III in the first round and Kirk Cousins in the fourth round. Shanahan catered the offense to Griffin III, creating a playbook based on what he was used to at Baylor. However, in the Week 14 game against the Baltimore Ravens on December 9, Griffin III was injured when defensive end Haloti Ngata hit Griffin directly at his right knee, twisting it in the process. Kirk Cousins then came into the game and led the team to a 31–28 overtime victory. This injury forced the team to start Cousins in the team's week 15 game. ESPN has reported that team owner Dan Snyder assured Griffin III that no matter how well Cousins played, he would not get the starting spot. This incident led to a confrontation between Shanahan's father, head coach Mike Shanahan, and Snyder and created tension between the Shanahans and ownership for the rest of their tenure.

In 2012, Shanahan was fined $25,000 for insulting the replacement officials and confronting one after a loss to the Cincinnati Bengals.

In early December 2013, ESPN reported that Mike Shanahan was frustrated with the special treatment that he believed that Robert Griffin III received from Snyder. This led Shanahan to preemptively clean out his office ahead of the start of the 2012–13 NFL playoffs. On December 30, 2013, Kyle, along with his father and some of the coaching staff, were fired from the Redskins.

=== Cleveland Browns (2014) ===
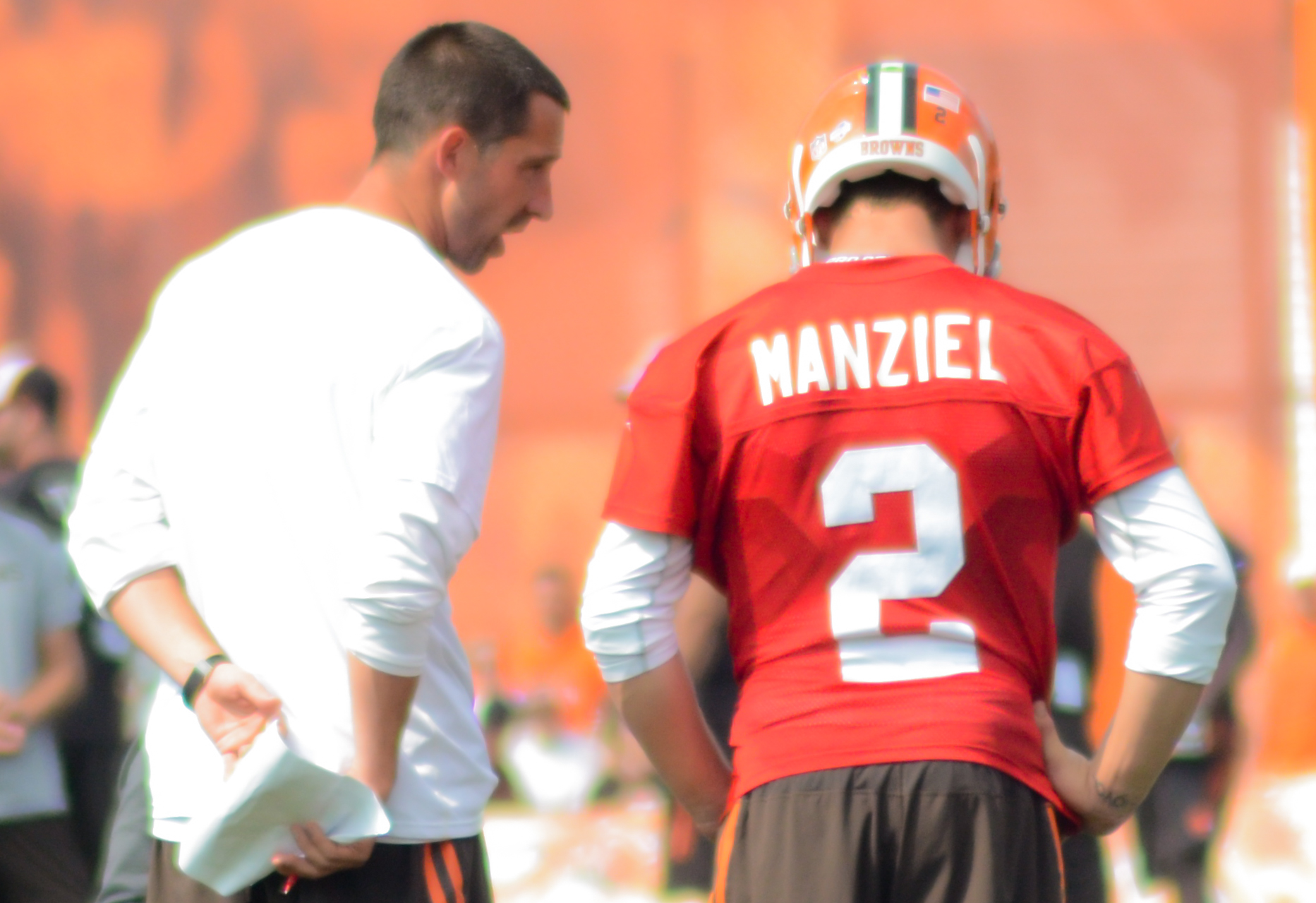
Shanahan (left) with Johnny Manziel in 2014

On February 1, 2014, it was reported by media outlets that Shanahan was hired as offensive coordinator for the Cleveland Browns. Prior to being hired by the Browns, he interviewed for the vacant offensive coordinator jobs held by the Miami Dolphins and Baltimore Ravens.

In May 2014, at the NFL Draft the Browns traded up to select the star college quarterback, Johnny Manziel. According to ESPN, the Browns front office's eagerness to replace starting quarterback Brian Hoyer with Manziel led to conflict with Browns coaches, including Shanahan. Manziel replaced Hoyer in the Week 13 match against the Buffalo Bills and was given the starting job two weeks later against the Cincinnati Bengals. However, Manziel struggled to execute Shanahan's scheme and played poorly, throwing two interceptions in the game and posting a quarterback rating of 1.0.

In January 2015, Shanahan compiled a 32-page document for the Browns explaining why it would be best for him to be released from the two remaining years of his contract. On January 8, 2015, the Browns accepted Shanahan's resignation from his offensive coordinator position, with ESPN reporting that the team and Shanahan were at odds over Johnny Manziel .

=== Atlanta Falcons (2015–2016) ===
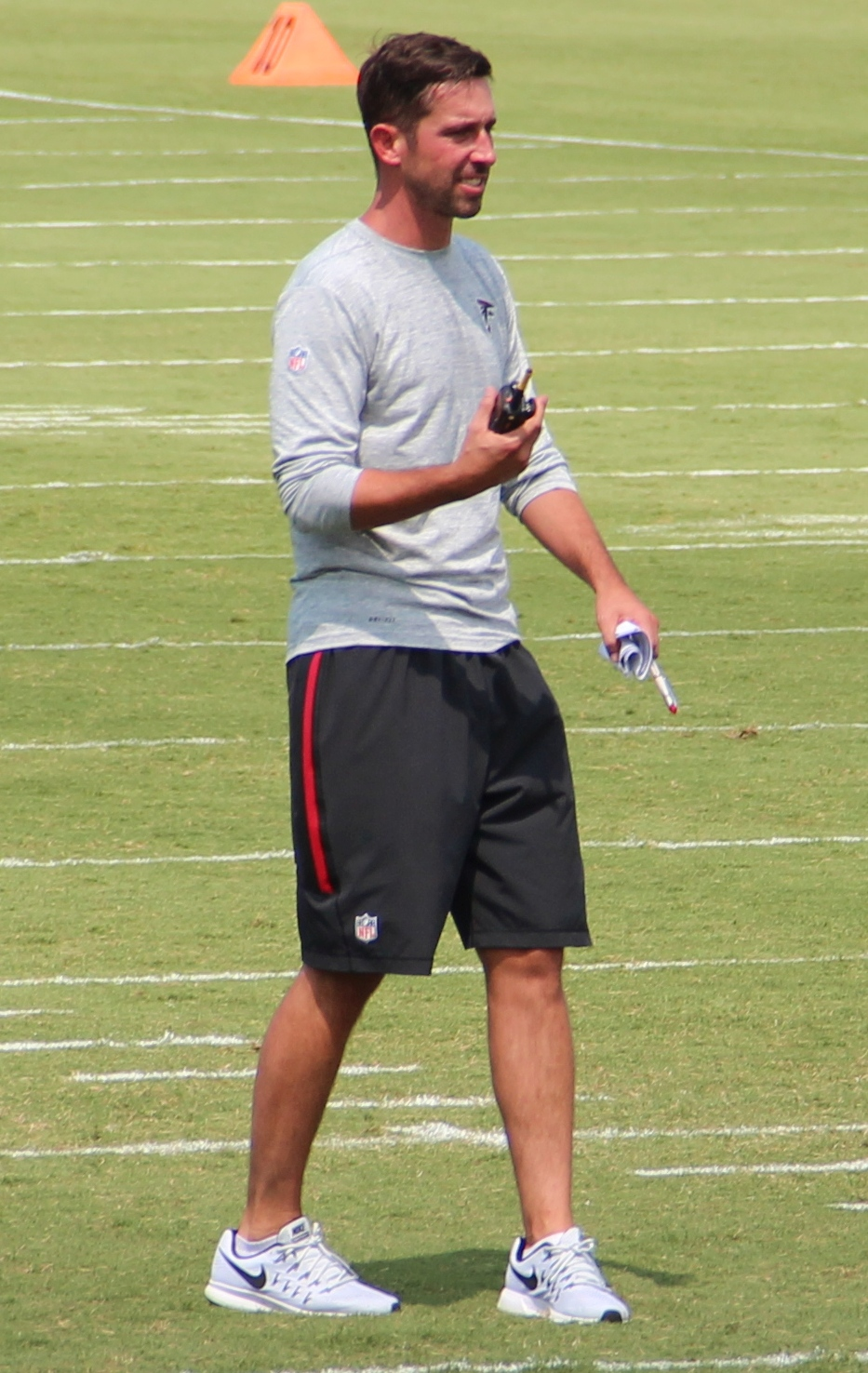
Shanahan at training camp in 2016

On January 18, 2015, the Atlanta Falcons hired Shanahan as their new offensive coordinator.

Shanahan's first season with the Falcons was a disappointment, with the offense ending the 2015 season ranked 21st in points. The offensive struggles included the Falcons' first shutout since 2004, losing 38–0 to the Carolina Panthers. Despite the lack of results, Shanahan believed that the team was really close to success, only needing a few extra pieces to significantly improve.

The 2016 season went much better. Putting the previous year's 8–8 campaign behind them, the Falcons' offense under Shanahan was the highest-scoring offense in the league in 2016 and finished atop the NFC South with an 11–5 record. The team went on to reach Super Bowl LI against the New England Patriots. Shanahan was named the NFL Assistant Coach of the Year for the 2016 season. He was also named Coordinator of the Year by Sporting News and Assistant Coach of the Year by the Pro Football Writers of America.

During Super Bowl LI, the Falcons held a 28–3 lead over the Patriots in the third quarter, in part thanks to Shanahan's play-calling and the Falcons' execution of those plays. However, Shanahan was criticized for being too aggressive by not using a ball-control running attack late in the game, a decision considered by many to have contributed to the Falcons losing their 25-point lead, as they eventually lost the game in overtime by a score of 34–28.

Despite the sour ending to his Atlanta tenure, Shanahan has stated that he bears no ill will towards the Falcons and credited his two years working for head coach Dan Quinn as an important learning experience. Indeed, Quinn's Falcon coaching staff was something of a brain trust. Shanahan's offensive coaching staff under Quinn included two future NFL head coaches, Matt LaFleur and Mike McDaniel. Quinn's defensive assistants also included two future NFL head coaches, Raheem Morris and Jeff Ulbrich.

=== San Francisco 49ers (2017–present) ===
==== 2017 ====
On February 6, 2017, the day after the Super Bowl, Shanahan was officially hired as the next head coach of the San Francisco 49ers, signing a six-year deal. Shanahan won his first preseason game 27–17 against the Kansas City Chiefs on August 11, 2017. However, the 49ers began the season with nine consecutive losses. On November 12, 2017, Shanahan won his first regular-season game, against the New York Giants by a score of 31–21. Three weeks later, the 49ers pulled out a narrow 15–14 road victory over the Chicago Bears, which marked the first start for quarterback Jimmy Garoppolo as a 49er. In the regular-season finale, the 49ers defeated the Los Angeles Rams on the road 34–13, ending the season on a five-game win streak, and winning six out of the last seven games, to finish 6–10. The prior year, the 49ers had won only two games.

==== 2018 ====
In 2018, the 49ers won only four games. The team was impacted by an early season-ending torn ACL to starting quarterback Garoppolo. Garoppolo's injury was immediately viewed as ruining the 49ers' hopes for the season, despite Shanahan's optimistic outlook on Garoppolo's replacement, C. J. Beathard.

==== 2019 ====
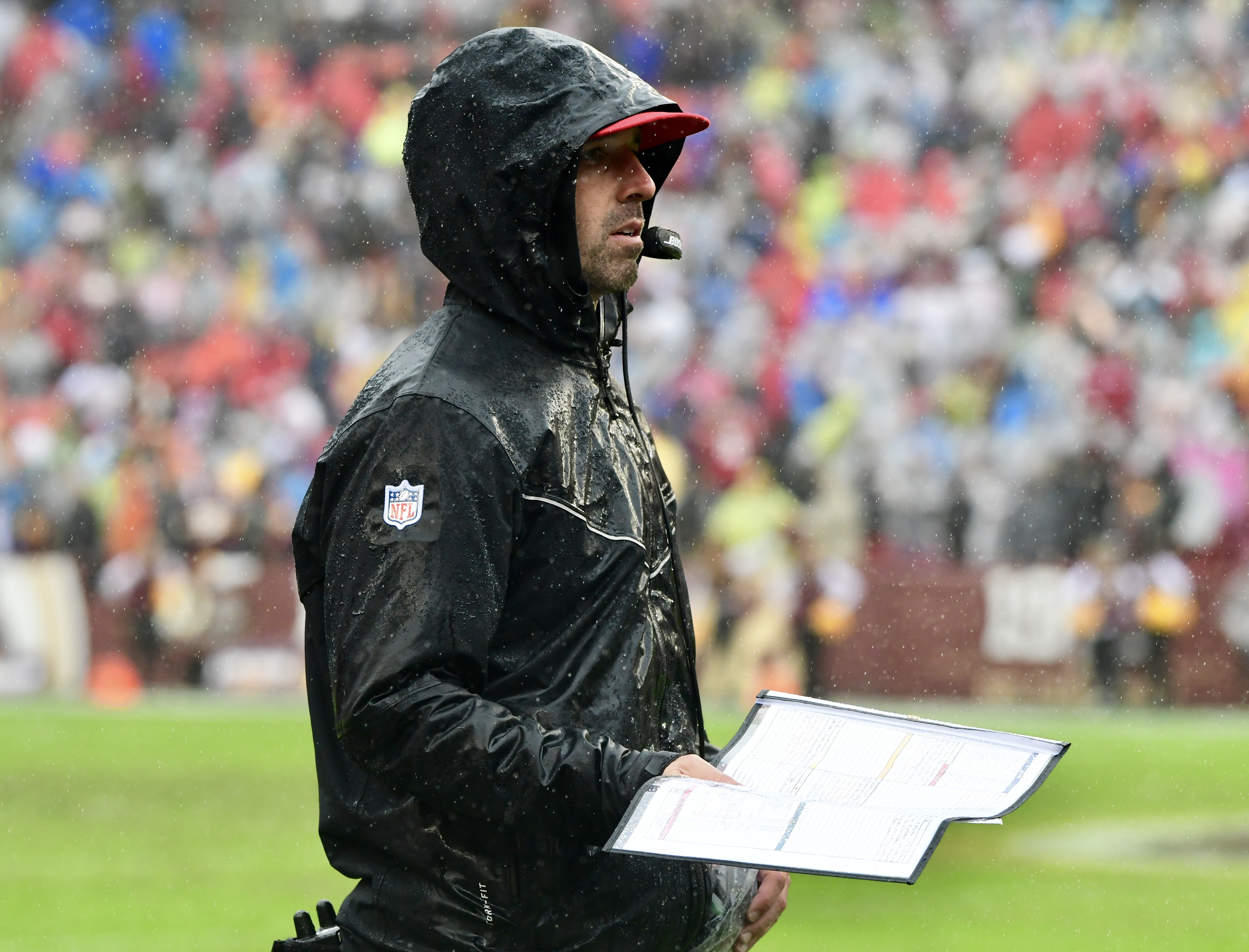
Shanahan in 2019

The 49ers won their first eight games of the 2019 season, making Shanahan only the third coach, along with Tom Landry and Marvin Lewis, to begin 8–0 after an earlier 0–8 season start. The 49ers finished the regular season with a 13–3 record, winning the NFC West division title and securing the #1-seed in the NFC, giving the team home-field advantage throughout the playoffs. The 49ers defeated the Minnesota Vikings 27–10 during the Divisional Round and advanced to the NFC Championship Game, where they defeated the Green Bay Packers 37–20 to advance to Super Bowl LIV. Despite taking a 20–10 lead in the second half, the 49ers lost to the Kansas City Chiefs by a score of 31–20. For his part, Shanahan won the Sporting News NFL Coach of the Year award and was the runner-up for the AP NFL Coach of the Year, losing to John Harbaugh.

==== 2020 season ====
On June 15, 2020, the 49ers signed Shanahan to a new six-year contract extension through the 2025 season. He was fined $100,000 by the NFL for not properly wearing a face mask, as required for coaches during the COVID-19 pandemic, during a Week 2 matchup in the 2020 NFL season. The 49ers suffered multiple injuries to key starters throughout the season and missed the playoffs, finishing with a 6–10 record.

==== 2021 season ====
Shanahan was fined $50,000 by the NFL on July 1, 2021, for violating practice rules during organized team activities. After starting the season 3–5, the 49ers won seven of their last nine games to finish 10–7 and enter the postseason as a wild card team with the #6-seed. They defeated the Dallas Cowboys on the road 23–17 in the Wild Card Round and defeated the Green Bay Packers on the road 13–10 during the Divisional Round, before losing on the road 20–17 in the NFC Championship Game to the eventual Super Bowl Champion Los Angeles Rams.

==== 2022 season ====
In 2022, Shanahan led the 49ers to a 13–4 regular season mark, which earned the team the NFC West title and the #2-seed in the NFC for the postseason. The 49ers accomplished their regular season success despite injuries to Trey Lance and Jimmy Garoppolo. The emergence of rookie Brock Purdy as the team's starting quarterback in the latter part of the season contributed to the team's success, as well as providing a terrific narrative, as Purdy had been the last player drafted that year, earning that year's tongue-in-cheek title of Mr. Irrelevant. Shanahan helped lead the 49ers to a third NFC Championship Game appearance in four seasons following victories over the Seattle Seahawks during the Wild Card Round and the Dallas Cowboys in the Divisional Round. During the NFC Championship Game against the Philadelphia Eagles, the 49ers were forced to substitute Josh Johnson in for an injured Purdy. Johnson suffered a concussion and was forced to leave the game as well. Purdy then returned to finish the game, but was ineffective due to his injury, virtually unable to throw. The 49ers lost on the road 31–7. For the season, Shanahan came in second place in voting for the AP Coach of the year award, this time behind Brian Daboll of the Giants.

==== 2023 season ====
Prior to the 2023 season, Shanahan signed a contract extension through 2027. In 2023, he led the 49ers to a 12–5 record, winning the NFC West for the second straight season and being named a finalist for the AP Coach of the Year award. He led the team to victories over the Green Bay Packers in the Divisional Round and the Detroit Lions in the NFC Championship game, where they stormed back from a 24–7 halftime deficit against Detroit, en route to Super Bowl LVIII, where San Francisco faced the Kansas City Chiefs in a rematch of Super Bowl LIV.

Like the initial matchup between the two teams four years earlier, the 49ers opened up a 10-point lead before Kansas City rallied and eventually emerged victorious yet again, this time by a score of 25–22 in overtime. It was just the second overtime game in Super Bowl history, the first being Super Bowl LI in which Shanahan had served as offensive coordinator for the Atlanta Falcons. He received backlash for electing to receive possession first in overtime after winning the coin toss, rather than let Patrick Mahomes and the Chiefs offense see the field first, which would have allowed the 49ers to gameplan based on the result of Kansas City's drive, since both offenses would get an opportunity in the extra period, regardless of whether or not a touchdown was scored in the first drive, after new postseason overtime rules were implemented following the 2021–22 NFL playoffs. Shanahan was also criticized after some 49ers players claimed that they were not aware of the updated overtime rules.

==== 2024 season ====
In a 2024 season marred by injuries, Shanahan led the team to a 6–11 record.

==== 2025 season ====
In the 2025 season, Shanahan led the team to a 12–5 record and a playoff berth despite numerous injuries. During the Wild Card Round, the 49ers defeated the Philadelphia Eagles 23–19. The 49ers fell to the eventual Super Bowl champion Seattle Seahawks 41–6 in the Divisional Round.

==== 2026 season ====
On September 11, 2026, the 49ers signed Shanahan to a multi-year extension. Kyle Shannahan surpassed Bill Walsh for the most games coached in 49ers history on October 4, in a game against the Denver Broncos.

== Head coaching record ==
Team	Year	Regular season					Postseason			
Team	Year	Won	Lost	Ties	Win %	Finish	Won	Lost	Win %	Result
SF	2017	6	10	0	.375	4th in NFC West	—	—	—	—
SF	2018	4	12	0	.250	3rd in NFC West	—	—	—	—
SF	2019	13	3	0	.813	1st in NFC West	2	1	.667	Lost to Kansas City Chiefs in Super Bowl LIV
SF	2020	6	10	0	.375	4th in NFC West	—	—	—	—
SF	2021	10	7	0	.588	3rd in NFC West	2	1	.667	Lost to Los Angeles Rams in NFC Championship Game
SF	2022	13	4	0	.765	1st in NFC West	2	1	.667	Lost to Philadelphia Eagles in NFC Championship Game
SF	2023	12	5	0	.706	1st in NFC West	2	1	.667	Lost to Kansas City Chiefs in Super Bowl LVIII
SF	2024	6	11	0	.353	4th in NFC West	—	—	—	—
SF	2025	12	5	0	.706	3rd in NFC West	1	1	.500	Lost to Seattle Seahawks in NFC Divisional Round
SF	2026	8	1	0	.889	TBD in NFC West	—	—	—	—
Total		90	68	0	.570		9	5	.643	

== Coaching tree ==
Shanahan has worked under six head coaches:

- Karl Dorrell, UCLA (2003)
- Jon Gruden, Tampa Bay Buccaneers (2004–2005)
- Gary Kubiak, Houston Texans (2006–2009)
- Mike Shanahan, Washington Redskins (2010–2013)
- Mike Pettine, Cleveland Browns (2014)
- Dan Quinn, Atlanta Falcons (2015–2016)

Six of Shanahan's assistants have been hired as head coaches in the NFL or NCAA:

- Jeff Hafley, Boston College (2020–2023) and Miami Dolphins (2026–present)
- Robert Saleh, New York Jets (2021–2024) and Tennessee Titans (2026–present)
- Mike McDaniel, Miami Dolphins (2022–2025)
- DeMeco Ryans, Houston Texans (2023–present)
- Mike LaFleur, Arizona Cardinals (2026–present)
- Klint Kubiak, Las Vegas Raiders (2026–present)

== Personal life ==
Shanahan met his future wife, Amanda O'Donnell, in high school. They dated throughout high school and college and got married in 2005. They have three children. In July 2026, Shanahan suffered severe injuries from a car crash, leading him to take a reduced role as head coach of the 49ers for summer camp.
