= Connor Senger =

American football coach

Arizona Cardinals
- Title: Pass game specialist

Career information
- Position: Quarterback
- High school: Pius XI (Milwaukee, Wisconsin)
- College: Wisconsin (2013–2014); Wisconsin–Oshkosh (2015–2016)

Career history
- Wisconsin–Oshkosh (2017) Quarterbacks coach; Carroll (2018) Quarterbacks coach; Wisconsin–Whitewater (2019) Running backs coach; North Dakota State (2020–2021) Offensive quality control coordinator; Arizona Cardinals (2022-present); Bill Bidwell Fellowship (2022); Offensive quality control coach (2023); Assistant quarterbacks coach (2024); Pass game specialist (2025-present)

Connor Senger is an American football coach who is the pass game specialist for the Arizona Cardinals of the National Football League (NFL).

== Early life and playing career ==
Connor Senger, originally from West Allis, Wisconsin, played high school football at Pius XI High School, where he served as a three-year captain. During his high school career, Senger threw for 4,564 yards and 37 touchdowns while also rushing for 2,190 yards and 39 touchdowns.

Senger began his collegiate playing career at the University of Wisconsin (2013–2014), where he was recognized as the Offensive Scout Team Player of the Year in both seasons. He then transferred to the University of Wisconsin–Oshkosh, where he played his final two seasons and was part of two conference championship teams.

== Coaching career ==
Following his playing career, Senger transitioned into coaching, starting as the quarterbacks coach at UW–Oshkosh in 2017. That season, he played a pivotal role in developing quarterback Brett Kasper, who won the prestigious Gagliardi Trophy as the top player in NCAA Division III football.

Senger moved on to Carroll University in Wisconsin in 2018, where he served as the quarterbacks coach. The following year, he joined Wisconsin–Whitewater as the running backs coach, contributing to a program that reached the Division III national championship game.

In 2020, Senger joined North Dakota State University as an offensive quality control coordinator, a role he held for two seasons. During his tenure, NDSU won the FCS National Championship in 2021, boasting one of the most efficient offenses in the nation. Senger contributed to quarterback development, opponent breakdowns, special teams, recruiting, and play calling.

After his success at NDSU, Senger was hired as the offensive coordinator and quarterbacks coach at Central Washington in February 2022. However, he soon transitioned to the NFL, joining the Arizona Cardinals on March 30, 2022, as part of the Bill Bidwill Coaching Fellowship. As a result, he was unable to coach at Central Washington before making the move to the Cardinals. In this role, he assisted with the development of the Cardinals’ quarterbacks.

In 2023, Senger was promoted to offensive quality control coach. Under his guidance, quarterback Kyler Murray returned from a serious knee injury and helped the Cardinals achieve the ninth-ranked offense in the NFL, averaging 362.8 yards per game and 22.4 points per game.

In the 2024 offseason, Senger earned another promotion, becoming the Cardinals’ assistant quarterbacks coach. Additionally, he was selected to serve as the wide receivers coach for the American team at the Senior Bowl.

In the 2025 offseason, Senger earned another promotion, becoming the Cardinals’ passing game coach. Additionally, he was selected to coach the wide receivers in the East–West Shrine Bowl. On February 20, 2026, Senger was retained under new head coach Mike LaFleur under the role of pass game specialist.

== Bill Bidwill Coaching Fellowship ==
The Arizona Cardinals established the Bill Bidwill Coaching Fellowship in 2015 to promote diversity and provide coaching opportunities at the highest level. Senger was the fifth participant in the program, following Jordan Hogan (2020–2021), Don Shumpert (2019), Terry Allen (2017–2018), and Levon Kirkland (2015–2016).

== Education ==
Senger earned his bachelor's degree in political science with a minor in history from the University of Wisconsin–Oshkosh.
