= Matt LaFleur =

American football player and coach (born 1979)

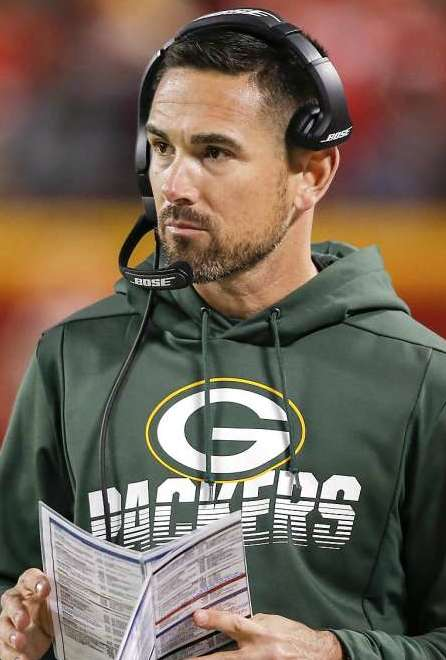
- LaFleur with the Green Bay Packers in 2019

Green Bay Packers
- Title: Head coach

Personal information
- Born: November 3, 1979 (age 47); Mount Pleasant, Michigan, U.S.

Career information
- Position: Quarterback
- High school: Mount Pleasant (MI)
- College: Western Michigan (1998–1999); Saginaw Valley State (2000–2002)

Career history

Playing
- Omaha Beef (2003); Billings Outlaws (2004)

Coaching
- Saginaw Valley State (2003) Offensive assistant; Central Michigan (2004–2005) Graduate assistant; Northern Michigan (2006) Quarterbacks coach; Ashland (2007) Offensive coordinator; Houston Texans (2008–2009) Offensive assistant; Washington Redskins (2010–2013) Quarterbacks coach; Notre Dame (2014) Quarterbacks coach; Atlanta Falcons (2015–2016) Quarterbacks coach; Los Angeles Rams (2017) Offensive coordinator; Tennessee Titans (2018) Offensive coordinator; Green Bay Packers (2019–present) Head coach

Head coaching record
- Regular season: 82–44–1 (.650)
- Postseason: 3–6 (.333)
- Career: 85–50–1 (.629)
- Coaching profile at Pro Football Reference

Matthew Robert LaFleur (/ləˈfluːər/ la-FLEW-er; born November 3, 1979) is an American professional football coach and former player who is the head coach for the Green Bay Packers of the National Football League (NFL). He previously served as the offensive coordinator for the Los Angeles Rams and Tennessee Titans, and has also served as the quarterbacks coach for the Washington Commanders, Notre Dame, and Atlanta Falcons.

Prior to his coaching career, LaFleur was a successful multi-year starting quarterback for Saginaw Valley State University after spending two years as a walk-on wide receiver for Western Michigan University. He also spent two seasons playing professional football in the Indoor Football League before committing full time to coaching. LaFleur is the older brother of Arizona Cardinals head coach Mike LaFleur.

== Early life and playing career ==
Matthew Robert LaFleur was born on November 3, 1979 to Denny and Kristi LaFleur. Denny had been a linebacker at Central Michigan University, winning a national championship in 1974, and at one point, held their record for the most career tackles before becoming a long-time assistant football coach at the school. Kristi was a physical education and health teacher who coached track and cheerleading. Her father coached football at Loy Norrix High School in Kalamazoo, Michigan.

LaFleur was raised in Mount Pleasant, Michigan and played football and basketball at Mount Pleasant High School. He started at quarterback as a junior and senior, and played well enough to earn all-state honors. LaFleur graduated in 1998.

Despite his family's strong ties to Central Michigan University, LaFleur chose to enroll at their rival Western Michigan University after Central Michigan head coach Dick Flynn fired his father in 1997. LaFleur joined Western's football team as a walk-on player, but saw no playing time. After two years, he was asked by Western's coaches to switch positions from quarterback to wide receiver. They argued that with Tim Lester's success, LaFleur had no viable path to getting on the field. LaFleur instead decided to transfer out of the program.

LaFleur transferred to Division II Saginaw Valley State University. He became their starting quarterback after Garrett Small suffered a career-ending injury in the first game of the season. LaFleur's play helped the Cardinals reach the D-II playoffs in each of his three years at the school. During his three-year run as the Cardinal quarterback, SVSU compiled an overall record of 29–8 and qualified for the NCAA Division II Playoffs each year. LaFleur left Saginaw Valley State as their all-time leader in passing yards (7,699), completions, and passing touchdowns (67). LaFleur was inducted into the SVSU Cardinal Athletic Hall of Fame in 2021. He graduated with a bachelor’s degree in secondary education in 2003.

LaFleur briefly played professionally in the National Indoor Football League with the Omaha Beef as the backup quarterback in 2003 and, the following summer, signed with the Billings Outlaws.

== Coaching career ==
=== Early years ===
LaFleur's coaching career began in 2003 at Saginaw Valley State as an offensive graduate assistant. He also substitute taught in the local high schools (Garber High School), specializing in math. After retiring from playing football, LaFleur was hired by Central Michigan University as a graduate assistant for the 2004 and 2005 seasons. In 2006, he was hired as the quarterbacks coach for Northern Michigan University. After one year at Northern, LaFleur spent the 2007 football season as the offensive coordinator for Ohio's Ashland University.

=== Houston Texans ===
LaFleur then was hired in 2008 by the Houston Texans to serve as an offensive assistant. He assisted both wide receivers and quarterbacks during his two-year stint there and developed a close relationship with offensive coordinator Kyle Shanahan.

=== Washington Redskins ===
When Shanahan's father Mike was hired by the Washington Redskins, Kyle brought LaFleur to Washington to coach the quarterbacks in 2010. From 2011 to 2013, LaFleur worked alongside four other future head coaches in Washington: Kyle Shanahan, Sean McVay, Mike McDaniel, and Raheem Morris. A primary responsibility of LaFleur's for the 2012 season was to mentor rookie quarterbacks Robert Griffin III and Kirk Cousins.

=== Notre Dame ===
After six years of coaching in the NFL, LaFleur returned to college football as the quarterbacks coach at the University of Notre Dame in 2014. LaFleur tutored senior quarterback Everett Golson who posted 3,445 yards and 29 touchdowns through the air, helping him become just the fourth quarterback in school history to eclipse such totals in a single season.

=== Atlanta Falcons ===
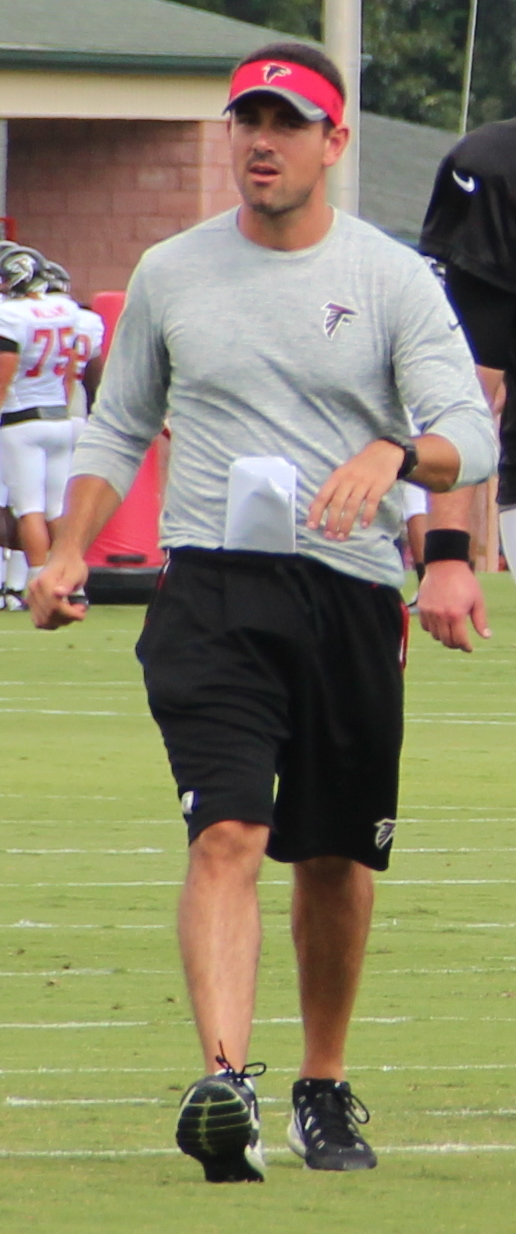
LaFleur in 2016

On February 5, 2015, LaFleur returned to the NFL as the quarterbacks coach for the Atlanta Falcons working under offensive coordinator Kyle Shanahan, with whom he had previously worked while with the Redskins and Texans. LaFleur's younger brother, Mike, was also an offensive assistant with the Falcons.

In 2016, LaFleur coached Matt Ryan on his way to winning his lone NFL MVP award. The Falcons reached Super Bowl LI, where they faced the New England Patriots, but squandered a 28–3 lead and lost 34–28 in overtime, a monumental meltdown that drew heavy fan and media criticism.

=== Los Angeles Rams ===
On February 8, 2017, LaFleur joined the Los Angeles Rams coaching staff as offensive coordinator, working under new head coach Sean McVay, with whom he had previously worked during his tenure with the Washington Redskins. Under LaFleur and McVay, the Rams finished the year with an 11–5 record and as the league's number one scoring offense, scoring 478 points through 16 games.

=== Tennessee Titans ===
On January 30, 2018, LaFleur left his position with the Rams to take the same position with the Tennessee Titans. Joining new head coach Mike Vrabel, LaFleur's role in directing the offense increased, as he had play-calling responsibilities unlike during his tenure with the Rams.

The season was plagued with injuries, with the Titans losing star tight end Delanie Walker in Week 1, and starting quarterback Marcus Mariota dealing with an incessant nerve injury throughout the season. The season with the 27th ranked scoring offense in the NFL.

=== Green Bay Packers ===
LaFleur was hired as the head coach of the Green Bay Packers on January 8, 2019. On May 30, he suffered a torn Achilles while playing basketball. LaFleur also led the Packers to a 2–2 preseason.

==== 2019 season ====
On September 5, 2019, LaFleur made his regular-season head coaching debut against the Chicago Bears, and led the Packers to a 10–3 victory. He also became the first Green Bay head coach to win his first game against the Bears since Vince Lombardi in 1959. The Packers finished with a 13–3 record in LaFleur's first season as a head coach, and in the process, LaFleur became the first Packers rookie head coach to win 10 games, make the playoffs, and win the NFC North (as well as going 6–0 in division play in the process). In addition, the 13 wins were the most from a rookie coach since Jim Harbaugh did it with the 49ers in 2011.

LaFleur led Green Bay to their first postseason berth since 2016 as the NFC's #2-seed, as he won his postseason debut against the Seattle Seahawks 28–23 in the NFC Divisional Playoff to advance to the NFC Championship Game, where the Packers fell on the road to the top-seeded San Francisco 49ers 37–20.

==== 2020 season ====
The Packers began the 2020 season by winning all four games prior to an early Week 5 bye. After a 5–1 start to the season, the Packers dropped a home game 22–28 to the Minnesota Vikings, the team's first loss in the division under LaFleur. Despite this, the Packers continued playing well, and LaFleur clinched his second consecutive NFC North title and playoff berth in Week 14 with a 31–24 victory against the Detroit Lions. With a 35–16 win over the Chicago Bears in Week 17, Green Bay clinched the NFC's 1st seed and homefield advantage throughout the playoffs for the first time since the 2011 season. The Packers also closed the season out on a six-game winning streak, and LaFleur extended his win–loss record in December games to 9–0.

LaFleur finished with a 26–6 record in his first two seasons as head coach, tied for the second-best start for a head coach since the 1970 merger (only George Seifert, at 28–4, has a better record). His team finished as the league's number one offense, scoring 509 points over the course of the season, and with quarterback Aaron Rodgers throwing for a Packers franchise-record 48 touchdowns.

In the playoffs, LaFleur and the Packers hosted the Los Angeles Rams, who had the league's number one scoring defense and were led by one of LaFleur's former bosses, Rams head coach Sean McVay. The Packers defeated the Rams, 32–18, to host the NFC Championship Game for the first time since 2007. In the NFC Championship they lost to the eventual Super Bowl champion, the Tampa Bay Buccaneers, 31–26. LaFleur opted to kick a field goal in the fourth quarter on 4th and goal while down 31–23 instead of trying to tie the game with a touchdown and two-point conversion under league MVP Aaron Rodgers.

==== 2021 season ====
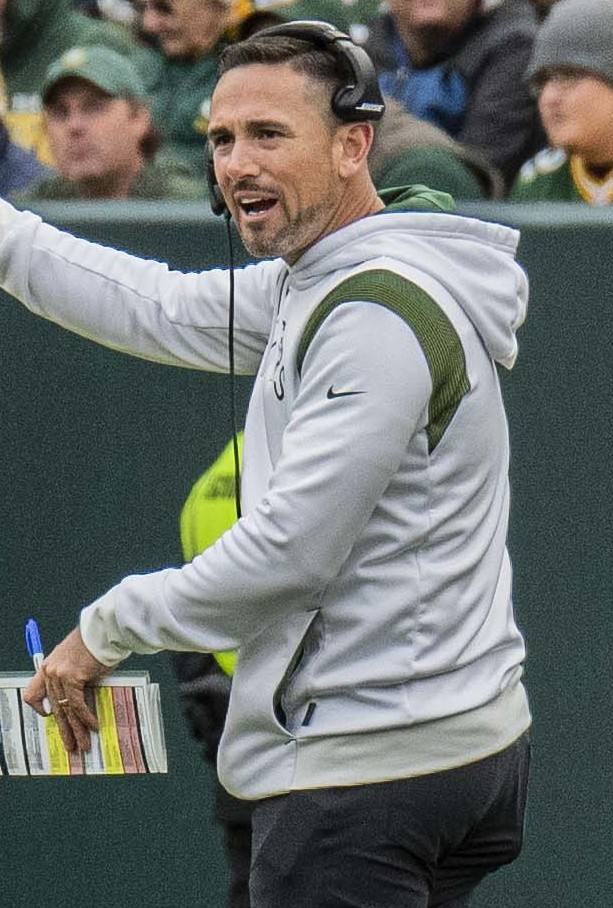
LaFleur on the sideline during a game in 2021

The 2021 season began with a 38–3 loss to the New Orleans Saints. The Packers proceeded to win each of their next six games to bring the 6–1 Packers to a Thursday night showdown with the NFL's last unbeaten team, the 7–0 Arizona Cardinals. In addition to playing on the road on a short week, the Packers were forced to play without their top three wide receivers, after Davante Adams and Allen Lazard tested positive for COVID-19 and Marquez Valdes-Scantling remained out with a hamstring injury since Week 3. Despite the challenges, the Packers emerged victorious, 24–21 with a thrilling last-minute interception of Cardinals quarterback Kyler Murray by cornerback Rasul Douglas, and LaFleur became the winningest head coach through his first 40 career games in NFL history.

The following week, star quarterback Aaron Rodgers tested positive for COVID-19, and LaFleur named second-year quarterback Jordan Love the starter for their Week 9 game against the Kansas City Chiefs. Although Love was relentlessly blitzed during his first career start, he managed to complete 19 of 34 passes for 190 yards, 1 touchdown and 1 interception. LaFleur took the blame for not being able to counter the Chiefs' aggressive defensive strategies. Special teams miscues ultimately cost the Packers the game, falling 7–13 to drop them to 7–2.

The Packers then shut out Seattle Seahawks quarterback Russell Wilson the following week, the first such occurrence in his career, to win their Week 10 game 17–0. In Week 11, LaFleur's Packers fell 31–34 to their division rival Minnesota Vikings, but rebounded to win 36–28 against LaFleur's former boss Sean McVay and the Los Angeles Rams the following week. The Packers clinched their third consecutive NFC North title with a tight 31–30 Week 15 victory over the Baltimore Ravens. LaFleur became the first head coach since Dallas's Barry Switzer to win the division in each of his first three years as head coach.

With a 37–10 Week 17 victory over the Minnesota Vikings, LaFleur's Packers clinched home-field advantage throughout the NFC playoffs and became the first team in NFL history to win 13 games a season in 3 consecutive years. In addition, LaFleur broke a 30-year-old record by George Seifert for the most wins by a head coach (39) through his first 3 seasons in the league. The win also meant to this point in his career, LaFleur had never lost consecutive regular season games during his 3-year tenure.

The Packers dealt with a notable amount of injuries throughout the season. Top outside linebacker Za'Darius Smith had not played since Week 1, while top cornerback Jaire Alexander had been out since spraining his shoulder in Week 4. Top left tackle David Bakhtiari tore his ACL during the 2020 season, and didn't return until Week 18. His replacement, Elgton Jenkins, was lost for the season with a similar ACL injury in Week 11. In addition, starting tight end Robert Tonyan met a similar fate during the Packers' Week 8 showdown in Arizona.

At the end of the regular season, quarterback Aaron Rodgers was named NFL MVP for the second consecutive year and fourth time overall. Rodgers noted LaFleur's contributions to his winning MVP in 2 of LaFleur's 3 seasons as head coach. Rodgers became the first player in the NFL to win consecutive MVP awards in 12 years, when Peyton Manning won in 2008 and 2009. In the playoffs, they lost their first game to the San Francisco 49ers, 13–10, giving LaFleur a 2–3 postseason record and no Super Bowl appearances in their three straight 13-win seasons. He took the blame for the Packers’ poor special teams effort, particularly one play where they were missing a man on the field during San Francisco's game-winning field goal.

==== 2022 season ====
LaFleur's 2022 season as head coach began with another opening day loss, this time to the Minnesota Vikings. The Packers would go on to win 3 straight, however, after the 3–1 start the season started to fall apart. In their next 8 games they would just go 1–7, making their record on the year 4–8.

The Packers won their next four games to get back to a .500 record, setting up a matchup with the Detroit Lions at home with a playoff berth on the line. The Packers would ultimately lose 20–16, finishing with an 8–9 record and giving Matt LaFleur his first losing season as head coach, as well as his first missing the playoffs.

==== 2023 season ====
In the offseason, star quarterback Aaron Rodgers was traded to the New York Jets, leaving 2020 first round pick Jordan Love as the team's starting quarterback. In Week 1, the Packers defeated the Chicago Bears 38–20, marking the Packers' first win without Aaron Rodgers as the starter since December 10, 2017, when they defeated the Cleveland Browns 27–21. It was also LaFleur's first opening week win since 2020. The Packers would go on to start the season 2–1, before losing four straight games and dropping to a 3–6 record.

In Week 12, the Packers upset the Detroit Lions on Thanksgiving, their first win against the Lions since Week 3 of the 2021 season. The following week, the Packers played the Kansas City Chiefs on Sunday Night Football, winning 27–19 and bringing them back up to a .500 record.

The Packers would go on to lose their next two games, before winning three straight, including a 17–9 win over the Bears, to claim the 7th seed in the NFC and head back to the playoffs.

In the Wild Card Round, the Packers traveled to AT&T Stadium to take on the #2 seed Dallas Cowboys. The Packers jumped out to an early 27–0 lead, and held on to beat the Cowboys 48–32, the first win by a #7 seed in NFL history. The win made LaFleur 3–0 against the Cowboys and 2–0 at AT&T Stadium. The Packers then lost for the fifth consecutive time in the playoffs to the San Francisco 49ers in the Divisional Round.

==== 2024 season ====
In May 2024, LaFleur suffered a torn pectoral muscle while lifting weights. He led the Packers to an 11–6 record, which qualified the team for the playoffs. The Packers lost to the Philadelphia Eagles 22–10 in the Wild Card Round.

==== 2025 season ====
In Week 4, LaFleur was criticized by Packers fans for his playcalling, settling for a field goal rather than going for a win against the Dallas Cowboys in a 40–40 tie. The Packers ended the season 9–7–1, losing their last four games. They made the playoffs as the NFC's seventh seed. In the Wild Card round, LaFleur’s Packers blew a 21–3 lead to the rival Chicago Bears, losing 31–27. The Packers and LaFleur agreed to a multiyear contract extension on January 17, 2026.

== Head coaching record ==
Team	Year	Regular season					Postseason			
Team	Year	Won	Lost	Ties	Win %	Finish	Won	Lost	Win %	Result
GB	2019	13	3	0	.813	1st in NFC North	1	1	.500	Lost to San Francisco 49ers in NFC Championship Game
GB	2020	13	3	0	.813	1st in NFC North	1	1	.500	Lost to Tampa Bay Buccaneers in NFC Championship Game
GB	2021	13	4	0	.765	1st in NFC North	0	1	.000	Lost to San Francisco 49ers in NFC Divisional Game
GB	2022	8	9	0	.471	3rd in NFC North	—	—	—	—
GB	2023	9	8	0	.529	2nd in NFC North	1	1	.500	Lost to San Francisco 49ers in NFC Divisional Game
GB	2024	11	6	0	.647	3rd in NFC North	0	1	.000	Lost to Philadelphia Eagles in NFC Wild Card Game
GB	2025	9	7	1	.559	2nd in NFC North	0	1	.000	Lost to Chicago Bears in NFC Wild Card Game
GB	2026	6	4	0	.625					
Total		82	44	1	.652		3	6	.333	

== Personal life ==
LaFleur is married to BreAnne, whom he met in college, and they have two sons. His younger brother, Mike, is the head coach of the Arizona Cardinals. LaFleur was the best man at Robert Saleh's wedding, as the two became close while working as graduate assistants at Central Michigan and as assistant coaches for the Houston Texans from 2008 to 2009, where they were colloquially known as the "Piss Boys."
