= Chris Cook (American football coach) =

American football player and coach (born 1981)

Arizona Cardinals
- Title: Assistant offensive line coach

Personal information
- Born: December 23, 1981 (age 44); Wingate, North Carolina
- Listed height: 6 ft 1 in (1.85 m)
- Listed weight: 315 lb (143 kg)

Career information
- Position: Center
- College: Chattanooga

Career history
- East Carolina (2016) Assistant offensive line coach & quality control coach; Chattanooga (2017–2018) Tight ends coach, offensive tackles coach & recruiting coordinator; Akron (2019–2020) Tight ends coach & offensive tackles coach; Denver Broncos (2021) Offensive qualify control coach; Duke (2022) Offensive analyst; Arizona Cardinals (2023–present) Assistant offensive line coach

Chris Cook (born December 23, 1981) is an American football coach who is currently the assistant offensive line coach for the Arizona Cardinals of the National Football League (NFL).

== Early life and Playing Career ==
Cook grew up in the Charlotte area and attended Forest Hills High School, where his performance earned him a scholarship to the University of Tennessee at Chattanooga. During his tenure with the Mocs from 2001 to 2003, he became a three-year letterwinner and a two-year starter at center. His collegiate career peaked in 2002 when he was named an All-American and voted the team’s Offensive MVP. After graduating in 2009 with a degree in Communications and a minor in Psychology, Cook pursued a professional career. He spent time in camps or on practice squads with the Chicago Bears, Philadelphia Eagles, Buffalo Bills, and Indianapolis Colts. He eventually landed in the Arena Football League, where he played three seasons as an offensive and defensive lineman for the Kansas City Brigade from 2007 to 2009.

== Coaching career ==
Cook began his coaching path at the high school level, serving as the defensive line coach at Weddington High School in 2009 and later as the defensive coordinator at Independence High School in 2015. Between these roles, he dedicated five years to youth development as a director for the Boys & Girls Club in Raleigh.

He made the jump to the collegiate level in 2016 at East Carolina University as an offensive quality control assistant. He then returned to his alma mater, UT-Chattanooga, from 2017 to 2018 to coach tight ends and offensive tackles while acting as recruiting coordinator. Following a two-year stint at the University of Akron as the tight ends coach and director of player development, he spent the 2022 season at Duke University as an offensive analyst.

Cook entered the NFL ranks in 2021 with the Denver Broncos in an offensive quality control role focusing on the offensive line. He joined the Arizona Cardinals in 2023, where he has been instrumental in developing one of the league's most productive rushing attacks. In 2024, the Cardinals' offensive line helped the team achieve 2,451 rushing yards and a franchise-record 5.29 yards per carry. He was selected as the offensive line coach for the National Team at the 2024 Senior Bowl. He is also a three-time recipient of the Bill Walsh Diversity Coaching Fellowship, having refined his craft with the Atlanta Falcons and Cleveland Browns.

== Personal ==
Cook graduated from the University of Tennessee at Chattanooga with a bachelor's degree in communications and a minor in psychology. He is married to Mandisa Foster, a native of Kansas City, Kansas. The couple has two children, a son and a daughter.
