= Mike LaFleur =

American football player and coach (born 1987)

- LaFleur with the Arizona Cardinals in 2026.

Arizona Cardinals
- Title: Head coach

Personal information
- Born: March 3, 1987 (age 39); Mount Pleasant, Michigan, U.S.

Career information
- Positions: Quarterback, Safety
- High school: Mount Pleasant (MI)
- College: Elmhurst (2005–2008)

Career history
- Elmhurst (2009) Offensive assistant; St. Joseph’s (IN) (2010–2012); Quarterbacks coach (2010); Offensive coordinator (2011–2012); Davidson (2013) Offensive coordinator, quarterbacks coach & wide receivers coach; Cleveland Browns (2014) Offensive intern; Atlanta Falcons (2015–2016) Offensive assistant; San Francisco 49ers (2017–2020); Passing game coordinator & wide receivers coach (2017–2018); Passing game coordinator (2019–2020); New York Jets (2021–2022) Offensive coordinator; Los Angeles Rams (2023–2025) Offensive coordinator; Arizona Cardinals (2026–present) Head coach

Head coaching record
- Regular season: 2–5 (.286)
- Coaching profile at Pro Football Reference

Michael Dennis LaFleur (born March 3, 1987) is an American professional football coach who is the head coach for the Arizona Cardinals of the National Football League (NFL). LaFleur played college football at Elmhurst University, and has previously served as an assistant coach for the Atlanta Falcons, the Cleveland Browns, the San Francisco 49ers, the New York Jets and the Los Angeles Rams, also serving as the offensive coordinator for the latter from 2023 to 2025. He is the younger brother of Green Bay Packers head coach Matt LaFleur.

== Early life and career ==
Mike LaFleur attended Elmhurst College (now Elmhurst University), playing football for the Bluejays from 2005 to 2008. After playing quarterback for his first three seasons, LaFleur moved to the defensive side of the ball as a senior, starting all 10 games at safety for the Bluejays in 2008. He was a team captain and a three-time letter winner at Elmhurst.

== Coaching career ==
=== Early career ===
Mike LaFleur started his coaching career in 2009 as an offensive assistant for the Elmhurst Bluejays. LaFleur next coached at Saint Joseph's from 2010 to 2012 before accepting an offensive coordinator position with Davidson in 2013.

=== Cleveland Browns ===
LaFleur accepted his first NFL position as an offensive intern in 2014 for the Cleveland Browns under offensive coordinator Kyle Shanahan.

=== Atlanta Falcons ===
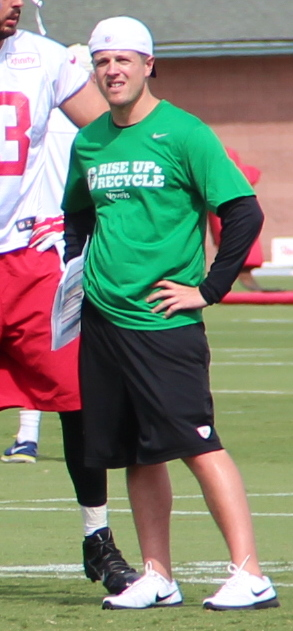
LaFleur with the Atlanta Falcons in 2015

LaFleur followed Shanahan to Atlanta for the 2015 and 2016 seasons as an offensive assistant.

=== San Francisco 49ers ===
Upon Kyle Shanahan's promotion to the head coach of the 49ers, LaFleur accepted a position as the passing game coordinator and wide receivers position coach for the San Francisco 49ers in 2017. LaFleur served in the dual role for two years before losing his wide receivers coach designation in 2019, upon Shanahan's addition of Wes Welker to his coaching staff. That season, LaFleur helped coach the 49ers to an NFC Championship, and before the Super Bowl, ESPN's Adam Schefter reported that LaFleur agreed to a contract extension with San Francisco.

=== New York Jets ===
LaFleur followed Robert Saleh from the 49ers to become the Jets' offensive coordinator in 2021. The Jets under his offense with rookie quarterback Zach Wilson went 4–13. After starting the 2022 season with seven wins and four losses, the team proceeded to lose six straight games, ending the campaign at 7–10 and missing the playoffs for an NFL high 12 straight years. In the last three games of that six game losing streak, the team failed to score a touchdown. On January 11, 2023, LaFleur and the Jets parted ways.

=== Los Angeles Rams ===
On January 27, 2023, LaFleur was hired by the Los Angeles Rams as their offensive coordinator under head coach Sean McVay.

=== Arizona Cardinals ===
On February 1, 2026, LaFleur was hired by the Arizona Cardinals to serve as the team's 45th-ever head coach.

On September 13, 2026, LaFleur earned his first NFL head coaching victory as the Arizona Cardinals defeated the Los Angeles Chargers, 26–14.

== Head coaching record ==
Team	Year	Regular season					Postseason			
Team	Year	Won	Lost	Ties	Win %	Finish	Won	Lost	Win %	Result
ARI	2026	3	7	0	.300	TBD In NFC West				
Total		3	7	0	.300		–	–	–	

== Personal life ==
He is the younger brother of Matt LaFleur, the head coach of the Green Bay Packers. LaFleur married his wife, Lauren, in July 2010. The couple have two children. He was a starting quarterback at Mount Pleasant High School in Mount Pleasant, Michigan, graduating in 2005.
