= 2023 Arizona Cardinals season =

104th season in franchise history

- Owner: Michael Bidwill
- General manager: Monti Ossenfort
- Head coach: Jonathan Gannon
- Home stadium: State Farm Stadium

Results
- Record: 4–13
- Division place: 4th NFC West
- Playoffs: Did not qualify
- Pro Bowlers: SS Budda Baker

Uniform
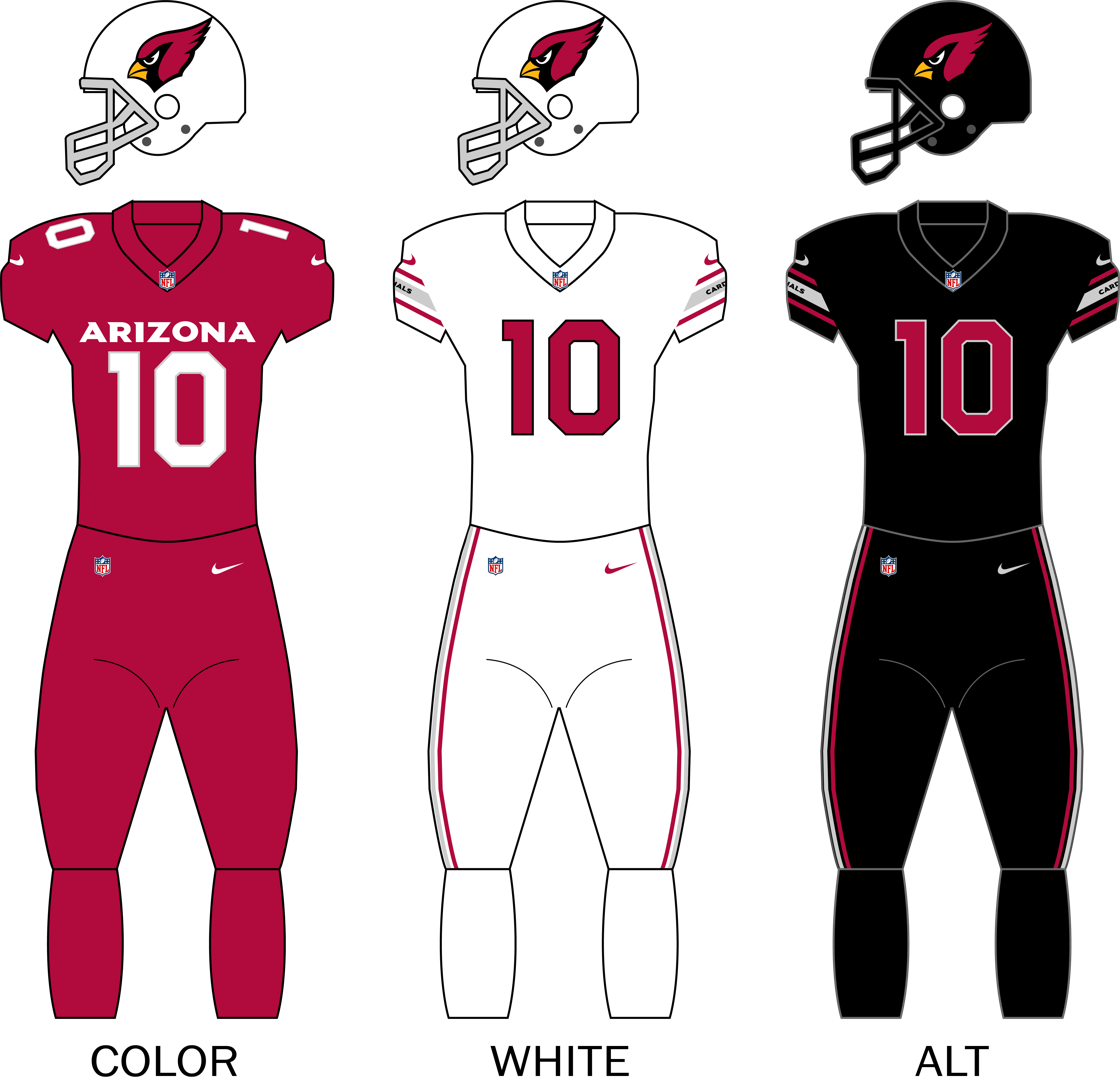

The 2023 season was the Arizona Cardinals' 104th season in the National Football League (NFL) and the first under new head coach Jonathan Gannon and general manager Monti Ossenfort. The Cardinals matched their 4–13 record from the previous year after an upset win over the Philadelphia Eagles in Week 17. The team also introduced new uniforms for the first time since the 2005 season.

For the first time since 2019, DeAndre Hopkins was not on the roster as he was released in the offseason.

After their Week 11 loss to the Houston Texans, they were guaranteed their second consecutive losing season. After another loss to the Los Angeles Rams the next week, they suffered their second consecutive double digit losing season. The loss was also their 800th regular season loss in franchise history - with only the Lions (704) within 150 of their record mark. After losing to the San Francisco 49ers in Week 15, the Cardinals were eliminated from playoff contention for the second consecutive season.

The Arizona Cardinals drew an average home attendance of 62,864 in 8 home games in the 2023 NFL season.

== Offseason ==
=== Head coach ===
The Cardinals fired fourth year head coach Kliff Kingsbury, who led the Cardinals to playoffs in 2021 and had been signed to a 5-year contract extension 10 months prior, on January 9. On February 14, two days after Super Bowl LVII concluded, the Cardinals hired former Philadelphia Eagles' defensive coordinator Jonathan Gannon as the team's new head coach. He was the last new head coach hired for the NFL before the 2023 NFL season began after being one of the first teams to search for a new head coach.

=== General manager ===
Tenth year general manager Steve Keim stepped down on January 9, following a tenure that had included the drafting of Pro Bowlers D. J. Humphries and Kyler Murray, and All-Pros Haason Reddick and Budda Baker. On January 16 the Cardinals hired former Tennessee Titans director of player personnel Monti Ossenfort as their new general manager.

=== Uniforms ===
On April 20, the Cardinals unveiled new uniforms. A large "Arizona" word mark is spread across the top of the numbers on the home uniform and does not appear on the away or alternate uniforms. The home uniform's numbers are accented with a silver outline and forgoes a sleeve pattern included on the alternate and away jerseys. The white uniform featured red numbers with black trim, and red and silver stripes along the pants and sleeves. Black remains the primary color of the alternate uniform. Its numbers are red with a silver outline. The helmet was modified to feature silver facemasks and silver reflective flakes on the shell, similar to their alternate helmet's red flakes. The helmet also includes larger holographic team logos included on either side.

== Roster changes ==
=== Free agents ===
Position	Player	Tag	2023 team	Notes
QB	David Blough	RFA	Arizona Cardinals	1 year, $1.23 million
QB	Trace McSorley	UFA	New England Patriots	1 year, $1.08 million
RB	Corey Clement	UFA	Arizona Cardinals	1 year, $1.08 million
RB	Darrel Williams	UFA	New Orleans Saints	–
WR	Pharoh Cooper	UFA	–	–
WR	Greg Dortch	ERFA	Arizona Cardinals	1 year
WR	Antoine Wesley	RFA	–	–
TE	Stephen Anderson	UFA	–	–
TE	Maxx Williams	UFA	–	–
OT	Rashaad Coward	UFA	Houston Texans	–
G	Cody Ford	UFA	Cincinnati Bengals	1 year, $1.08 million
OT	Kelvin Beachum	UFA	Arizona Cardinals	2 years, $5.15 million
G	Max Garcia	UFA	New Orleans Saints	–
G	Sean Harlow	UFA	New York Giants	–
G	Will Hernandez	UFA	Arizona Cardinals	2 years, $9 million
G	Joshua Miles	UFA	Atlanta Falcons	1 year, $1.16 million
C	Billy Price	UFA	New Orleans Saints	–
G	Justin Pugh	UFA	–	–
DE	Zach Allen	UFA	Denver Broncos	3 years, $47.75 million
DE	Michael Dogbe	UFA	Jacksonville Jaguars	1 year, $1.08 million
DE	Trysten Hill	UFA	Cleveland Browns	1 year, $1.23 million
DE	Jonathan Ledbetter	ERFA	Arizona Cardinals	1 year
ILB	Kamu Grugier-Hill	UFA	Carolina Panthers	1 year, $1.31 million
ILB	Ben Niemann	UFA	Tennessee Titans	1 year, $1.08 million
ILB	Ezekiel Turner	UFA	Arizona Cardinals	1 year, $2 million
ILB	Tanner Vallejo	UFA	–	–
ILB	Nick Vigil	UFA	–	–
CB	Antonio Hamilton	UFA	Arizona Cardinals	1 year, $5 million
CB	Josh Jackson	UFA	–	–
CB	Byron Murphy	UFA	Minnesota Vikings	2 years, $17.5 million
CB	Jace Whittaker	ERFA	Washington Commanders	–
S	Charles Washington	UFA	–	–
LS	Aaron Brewer	UFA	Arizona Cardinals	1 year, $1.6 million
K	Matt Prater	UFA	Arizona Cardinals	2 years, $7.5 million
P	Andy Lee	UFA	–	–

=== Signings ===
Position	Player	Tag	2022 team	Date signed	Notes
LB	Kyzir White	UFA	Philadelphia Eagles	March 15	2 years, $10 million
G	Hjalte Froholdt	UFA	Cleveland Browns	March 15	2 years, $4.6 million
DE	Kevin Strong	UFA	Tennessee Titans	March 15	1 year, $1.15 million
WR	Zach Pascal	UFA	Philadelphia Eagles	March 20	2 years, $4.5 million
DE	L. J. Collier	UFA	Seattle Seahawks	March 21	1 year, $1.2 million
G	Dennis Daley	UFA	Tennessee Titans	March 21	2 years, $3.2 million
LB	Josh Woods	UFA	Detroit Lions	March 23	1 year, $1.23 million
LB	Krys Barnes	UFA	Green Bay Packers	March 25	1 year, $1.03 million
CB	Rashad Fenton	UFA	Atlanta Falcons	March 30	1 year, $1.23 million
DE	Carlos Watkins	UFA	Dallas Cowboys	March 30	1 year, $1.67 million
OT	Elijah Wilkinson	UFA	Atlanta Falcons	April 4	1 year, $1.23 million
CB	Kris Boyd	UFA	Minnesota Vikings	April 10	1 year, $1.23 million
QB	Jeff Driskel	UFA	Houston Texans	April 17	1 year, $1.08 million

== Draft ==
2023 Arizona Cardinals draft selections
Round	Selection	Player	Position	College	Notes
1	3	Traded to the Houston Texans (Note: The Cardinals traded first- and fourth-round selections (3rd and 105th overall) to the Houston Texans in exchange for first- and second-round selections (12th and 33rd overall), and 2024 first- and third-round selections.)			
1	6	Paris Johnson Jr.	OT	Ohio State	From Rams via Lions (Note: The Cardinals traded first-, second- and fifth-round selections (12th, 34th and 168th overall) to the Detroit Lions in exchange for first- and third-round selections (6th and 81st overall).)
1	12	Traded to the Detroit Lions			From Texans
2	33	Traded to the Tennessee Titans (Note: The Cardinals traded second- and third-round selections (33rd and 81st overall) to the Tennessee Titans in exchange for second- and third-round selections (41st and 72nd overall), and a 2024 third-round selection.)			From Texans
2	34	Traded to the Detroit Lions			
2	41	BJ Ojulari	DE	LSU	From Titans
3	66	Traded to the Philadelphia Eagles (Note: The Cardinals traded a third-round selection (66th overall) to the Philadelphia Eagles in exchange for a third-round selection (94th overall) and a 2024 fifth-round selection. The trade settled Philadelphia's tampering complaint regarding Arizona hiring Eagles defensive coordinator Jonathan Gannon as their head coach.)			
3	72	Garrett Williams	CB	Syracuse	From Titans
3	81	Traded to the Tennessee Titans			From Lions
3	94	Michael Wilson	WR	Stanford	From Eagles
3	96	Traded to the Detroit Lions (Note: The Cardinals traded a third-round selection (96th overall) to the Detroit Lions in exchange for a fourth-round selection and two fifth-round selections (122nd, 139th and 168th overall).)			
4	105	Traded to the Houston Texans			
4	122	Jon Gaines II	G	UCLA	From Dolphins via Chiefs and Lions
5	137	Traded to the Buffalo Bills (Note: The Cardinals traded a fifth-round selection (137th overall) to the Buffalo Bills in exchange for G Cody Ford.)			
5	139	Clayton Tune	QB	Houston	From Broncos via Lions
5	168	Owen Pappoe	LB	Auburn	Compensatory pick; from Cardinals via Lions
6	180	Kei'Trel Clark	CB	Louisville	
6	213	Dante Stills	DT	West Virginia	Compensatory pick
7	220	Traded to the Las Vegas Raiders (Note: The Cardinals traded a conditional seventh-round selection (220th overall) to the Las Vegas Raiders in exchange for CB Trayvon Mullen. The pick would have become a sixth-rounder if Mullen was active for 10 games for the Cardinals in 2023.)			

2023 Arizona Cardinals undrafted free agents
Name	Position	College	Ref.
Daniel Arias	WR	Colorado	
Kendell Brooks	S	Michigan State	
Emari Demercado	RB	TCU	
Matt Hembrough	LS	Oklahoma State	
Joel Honigford	TE	Michigan	
Marvin Pierre	LB	Kent State	
Jacob Slade	DT	Michigan State	
Kyle Soelle	LB	Arizona State	
Quavian White	CB	Georgia State	
Blake Whiteheart	TE	Wake Forest	

Draft trades

== Staff ==
2023 Arizona Cardinals staff
Front office: Owner/chairman/president – Michael Bidwill; General manager – Monti Ossenfort; Assistant general manager – Dave Sears; Vice president of player personnel – Quentin Harris; Vice president of football operations & facilities – Matt Caracciolo; Director of player personnel – Dru Grigson; Assistant director of player personnel – Rob Kisiel; Director of college scouting – Ryan Gold; Assistant director of college scouting – Josh Scobey; Director of football administration – Matt Harriss; Head coaches: Head coach – Jonathan Gannon; Assistant head coach/special teams coordinator – Jeff Rodgers; Offensive coaches: Offensive coordinator – Drew Petzing; Quarterbacks – Israel Woolfork; Running backs – Autry Denson; Passing game coordinator/wide receivers – Drew Terrell; Tight ends – Ben Steele; Offensive line – Klayton Adams; Assistant offensive line – Chris Cook; Pass game specialist – Spencer Whipple; Offensive quality control – Connor Senger; Bill Bidwell coaching fellow – Blaine Gautier	Defensive coaches: Defensive coordinator – Nick Rallis; Defensive line – Derrick LeBlanc; Assistant defensive line – William Peagler; Linebackers – Sam Siefkes; Outside linebackers – Rob Rodriguez; Defensive backs – Patrick Toney; Cornerbacks – Ryan Smith; Defensive quality control – Ronald Booker; Special teams coaches: Assistant special teams – Sam Sewell; Strength and conditioning: Strength and conditioning – Buddy Morris; Assistant strength and conditioning – Mark Naylor

== Final roster ==
2023 Arizona Cardinals roster
Quarterbacks (QB): 1 Kyler Murray; 15 Clayton Tune; Running backs (RB): 22 Michael Carter; 6 James Conner; 31 Emari Demercado; Wide receivers (WR): 16 Dan Chisena; 83 Greg Dortch; 4 Rondale Moore; 0 Zach Pascal; 14 Michael Wilson; Tight ends (TE): 84 Elijah Higgins; 85 Trey McBride; 81 Travis Vokolek; 89 Blake Whiteheart	Offensive linemen (OL): 66 Jackson Barton T; 68 Kelvin Beachum T; 63 Trystan Colon G/C; 71 Dennis Daley G; 72 Hjalte Froholdt C; 76 Will Hernandez G; 60 Keith Ismael G; 70 Paris Johnson Jr. T; 61 Carter O'Donnell G; 65 Elijah Wilkinson G; Defensive linemen (DL): 95 Leki Fotu NT; 79 Phil Hoskins DE; 96 Naquan Jones DE; 98 Roy Lopez NT; 90 Ben Stille DE	Linebackers (LB): 51 Krys Barnes ILB; 25 Zaven Collins OLB; 52 Victor Dimukeje OLB; 45 Dennis Gardeck OLB; 43 Jesse Luketa OLB; 58 Tyreek Maddox-Williams ILB; 53 Trevor Nowaske ILB; 18 BJ Ojulari OLB; 44 Owen Pappoe ILB; 50 Tyreke Smith OLB; 97 Cameron Thomas OLB; 47 Ezekiel Turner ILB; Defensive backs (DB): 3 Budda Baker FS; 32 Joey Blount SS; 36 Andre Chachere FS; 13 Kei'Trel Clark CB; 33 Antonio Hamilton CB; 28 Qwuantrezz Knight FS; 26 Bobby Price CB; 24 Starling Thomas V CB; 34 Jalen Thompson SS; 21 Garrett Williams CB; 27 Divaad Wilson CB; Special teams (ST): 46 Aaron Brewer LS; 12 Blake Gillikin P; 5 Matt Prater K	Practice squad: 82 Andre Baccellia WR; 67 Ben Brown G; 23 Corey Clement RB; 17 Kaden Davis WR; 78 Marquis Hayes G; 75 Hayden Howerton G (PS/I); 37 Tony Jones Jr. RB; 35 Verone McKinley III SS; 80 Bernhard Seikovits TE (IPP); 64 Jacob Slade DE; 86 Jeff Smith WR; 54 Davion Taylor ILB; 75 Kendal Vickers DE; 38 Quavian White CB; Reserve: 2 Marquise Brown WR (IR); 91 L. J. Collier DE (IR); 50 Pat Elflein C (IR); 24 Rashad Fenton CB (IR); 59 Jon Gaines II G (IR); 39 Matt Hembrough LS (IR); 74 D. J. Humphries T (IR); 93 Jonathan Ledbetter DE (IR); 32 Marlon Mack RB (IR); 55 Dante Stills DE (IR); 87 Geoff Swaim TE (IR); 94 Carlos Watkins DE (IR); 7 Kyzir White ILB (IR); 10 Josh Woods ILB (IR); Rookies in italics 55 active, 14 reserve, 13 practice squad (1 exempt)

== Preseason ==
Week	Date	Opponent	Result	Record	Venue	Recap
1	August 11	Denver Broncos	W 18–17	1–0	State Farm Stadium	Recap
2	August 19	Kansas City Chiefs	L 10–38	1–1	State Farm Stadium	Recap
3	August 26	at Minnesota Vikings	W 18–17	2–1	U.S. Bank Stadium	Recap

== Regular season ==
=== Schedule ===
Week	Date	Opponent	Result	Record	Venue	Recap
1	September 10	at Washington Commanders	**L** 16–20	0–1	FedExField	Recap
2	September 17	New York Giants	**L** 28–31	0–2	State Farm Stadium	Recap
3	September 24	Dallas Cowboys	**W** 28–16	1–2	State Farm Stadium	Recap
4	October 1	at **San Francisco 49ers**	**L** 16–35	1–3	Levi's Stadium	Recap
5	October 8	Cincinnati Bengals	**L** 20–34	1–4	State Farm Stadium	Recap
6	October 15	at **Los Angeles Rams**	**L** 9–26	1–5	SoFi Stadium	Recap
7	October 22	at **Seattle Seahawks**	**L** 10–20	1–6	Lumen Field	Recap
8	October 29	Baltimore Ravens	**L** 24–31	1–7	State Farm Stadium	Recap
9	November 5	at Cleveland Browns	**L** 0–27	1–8	Cleveland Browns Stadium	Recap
10	November 12	Atlanta Falcons	**W** 25–23	2–8	State Farm Stadium	Recap
11	November 19	at Houston Texans	**L** 16–21	2–9	NRG Stadium	Recap
12	November 26	**Los Angeles Rams**	**L** 14–37	2–10	State Farm Stadium	Recap
13	December 3	at Pittsburgh Steelers	**W** 24–10	3–10	Acrisure Stadium	Recap
14	Bye					
15	December 17	**San Francisco 49ers**	**L** 29–45	3–11	State Farm Stadium	Recap
16	December 24	at Chicago Bears	**L** 16–27	3–12	Soldier Field	Recap
17	December 31	at Philadelphia Eagles	**W** 35–31	4–12	Lincoln Financial Field	Recap
18	January 7	**Seattle Seahawks**	**L** 20–21	4–13	State Farm Stadium	Recap

Note: Intra-division opponents are in bold text.

=== Game summaries ===
==== Week 1: at Washington Commanders ====
Week 1: Arizona Cardinals at Washington Commanders – Game summary

Quarter	1	2	3	4	Total
Cardinals	3	10	3	0	**16**
**Commanders**	7	3	0	10	**20**

at FedExField, Landover, Maryland

- Date: September 10
- Game time: 1:00 p.m. EDT/10:00 a.m. MST
- Game weather: Cloudy, 76 °F (24 °C)
- Game attendance: 64,693
- Referee: Alan Eck
- TV announcers (Fox): Adam Amin, Mark Schlereth and Kristina Pink
- Recap, Game Book

Game information

**First quarter**

- WAS – Brian Robinson Jr. 7-yard pass from Sam Howell (Joey Slye kick), 4:15. Commanders 7–0. **Drive: 6 plays, 91 yards, 3:20.**
- ARI – Matt Prater 28-yard field goal, 0:53. Commanders 7–3. **Drive: 8 plays, 64 yards, 3:22.**

**Second quarter**

- ARI – Matt Prater 54-yard field goal, 13:26. Commanders 7–6. **Drive: 4 plays, 1 yard, 1:20.**
- ARI – Cameron Thomas 2-yard fumble return (Matt Prater kick), 0:55. Cardinals 13–7.
- WAS – Joey Slye 30-yard field goal, 0:00. Cardinals 13–10. **Drive: 7 plays, 69 yards, 0:55.**

**Third quarter**

- ARI – Matt Prater 37-yard field goal, 10:09. Cardinals 16–10. **Drive: 11 plays, 56 yards, 4:51.**

**Fourth quarter**

- WAS – Sam Howell 6-yard run (Joey Slye kick), 11:48. Commanders 17–16. **Drive: 7 plays, 29 yards, 3:14.**
- WAS – Joey Slye 33-yard field goal, 2:23. Commanders 20–16. **Drive: 4 plays, 7 yards, 2:15.**

**Top passers**

- ARI – Joshua Dobbs – 21/30, 132 yards
- WAS – Sam Howell – 19/31, 202 yards, TD, INT

**Top rushers**

- ARI – James Conner – 14 rushes, 62 yards
- WAS – Brian Robinson Jr. – 19 rushes, 59 yards

**Top receivers**

- ARI – Rondale Moore – 3 receptions, 33 yards
- WAS – Curtis Samuel – 5 receptions, 54 yards

==== Week 2: vs. New York Giants ====
Week 2: New York Giants at Arizona Cardinals – Game summary

Quarter	1	2	3	4	Total
**Giants**	0	0	14	17	**31**
Cardinals	7	13	8	0	**28**

at State Farm Stadium, Glendale, Arizona

- Date: September 17
- Game time: 1:05 p.m. MST
- Game weather: None (retractable roof closed)
- Game attendance: 62,080
- Referee: Land Clark
- TV announcers (Fox): Adam Amin, Mark Schlereth and Kristina Pink
- Recap, Game Book

Game information

**First quarter**

- ARI – James Conner 4-yard rush (Matt Prater kick), 6:11. Cardinals 7–0. **Drive: 9 plays, 86 yards, 4:41.**

**Second quarter**

- ARI – Joshua Dobbs 23-yard rush (Matt Prater kick), 14:51. Cardinals 14–0. **Drive: 7 plays, 80 yards, 3:27.**
- ARI – Matt Prater 37-yard field goal, 8:43. Cardinals 17–0. **Drive: 9 plays, 54 yards, 5:02.**
- ARI – Matt Prater 44-yard field goal, 1:09. Cardinals 20–0. **Drive: 6 plays, 8 yards, 3:11.**

**Third quarter**

- NYG – Daniel Jones 14-yard rush (Graham Gano kick), 13:43. Cardinals 20–7. **Drive: 3 plays, 75 yards, 1:17.**
- ARI – Marquise Brown 3-yard pass from Joshua Dobbs (Joshua Dobbs run), 9:34. Cardinals 28–7. **Drive: 8 plays, 75 yards, 4:09.**
- NYG – Saquon Barkley 1-yard rush (Graham Gano kick), 3:27. Cardinals 28–14. **Drive: 12 plays, 75 yards, 6:07.**

**Fourth quarter**

- NYG – Saquon Barkley 9-yard pass from Daniel Jones (Graham Gano kick), 8:51. Cardinals 28–21. **Drive: 13 plays, 80 yards, 5:50.**
- NYG – Isaiah Hodgins 11-yard pass from Daniel Jones (Graham Gano kick), 4:25. Tied 28–28. **Drive: 6 plays, 64 yards, 3:06.**
- NYG – Graham Gano 34-yard field goal, 0:19. Giants 31–28. **Drive: 8 plays, 56 yards, 2:12.**

**Top passers**

- NYG – Daniel Jones – 26/37, 321 yards, 2 TD, INT
- ARI – Joshua Dobbs – 21/31, 228 yards, TD

**Top rushers**

- NYG – Saquon Barkley – 17 rushes, 63 yards, TD
- ARI – James Conner – 23 rushes, 106 yards, TD

**Top receivers**

- NYG – Jalin Hyatt – 2 receptions, 89 yards
- ARI – Zach Ertz – 6 receptions, 56 yards

After taking a 21-point lead late in the third quarter, the Cardinals collapsed and allowed New York to score 24 unanswered points and win the game. The 21-point blown lead is tied for the second largest blown lead in Cardinals history.

==== Week 3: vs. Dallas Cowboys ====
Week 3: Dallas Cowboys at Arizona Cardinals – Game summary

Quarter	1	2	3	4	Total
Cowboys	3	7	3	3	**16**
**Cardinals**	9	12	0	7	**28**

at State Farm Stadium, Glendale, Arizona

- Date: September 24
- Game time: 1:25 p.m. MST
- Game weather: None (retractable roof closed)
- Game attendance: 62,915
- Referee: Alex Kemp
- TV announcers (Fox): Joe Davis, Daryl Johnston and Pam Oliver
- Recap, Game Book

Game information

**First quarter**

- ARI – Matt Prater 39-yard field goal, 12:31. Cardinals 3–0. **Drive: 6 plays, 54 yards, 2:29.**
- ARI – James Conner 5-yard rush (run failed), 6:12. Cardinals 9–0. **Drive: 7 plays, 82 yards, 3:49.**
- DAL – Brandon Aubrey 49-yard field goal, 1:48. Cardinals 9–3. **Drive: 10 plays, 44 yards, 4:24.**

**Second quarter**

- ARI – Rondale Moore 45-yard rush (pass failed), 12:31. Cardinals 15–3. **Drive: 7 plays, 75 yards, 4:17.**
- DAL – Rico Dowdle 15-yard pass from Dak Prescott (Brandon Aubrey kick), 5:32. Cardinals 15–10. **Drive: 13 plays, 75 yards, 6:59.**
- ARI – Matt Prater 43-yard field goal, 1:28. Cardinals 18–10. **Drive: 10 plays, 50 yards, 4:04.**
- ARI – Matt Prater 62-yard field goal, 0:00. Cardinals 21–10. **Drive: 5 plays, 27 yards, 0:25.**

**Third quarter**

- DAL – Brandon Aubrey 27-yard field goal, 9:27. Cardinals 21–13. **Drive: 13 plays, 67 yards, 5:33.**

**Fourth quarter**

- DAL – Brandon Aubrey 26-yard field goal, 9:33. Cardinals 21–16. **Drive: 12 plays, 56 yards, 5:20.**
- ARI – Marquise Brown 2-yard pass from Joshua Dobbs (Matt Prater kick), 7:22. Cardinals 28–16. **Drive: 4 plays, 76 yards, 2:11.**

**Top passers**

- DAL – Dak Prescott – 25/40, 249 yards, TD, INT
- ARI – Joshua Dobbs – 17/21, 189 yards, TD

**Top rushers**

- DAL – Tony Pollard – 23 rushes, 122 yards
- ARI – James Conner – 14 rushes, 98 yards, TD

**Top receivers**

- DAL – Michael Gallup – 6 receptions, 92 yards
- ARI – Michael Wilson – 2 receptions, 86 yards

==== Week 4: at San Francisco 49ers ====
Week 4: Arizona Cardinals at San Francisco 49ers – Game summary

Quarter	1	2	3	4	Total
Cardinals	0	10	6	0	**16**
**49ers**	7	14	0	14	**35**

at Levi's Stadium, Santa Clara, California

- Date: October 1
- Game time: 1:25 p.m. MST & PDT
- Game weather: Sunny, 75 °F (24 °C)
- Game attendance: 71,521
- Referee: Clete Blakeman
- TV announcers (Fox): Kevin Kugler, Mark Sanchez and Laura Okmin
- Recap, Game Book

Game information

**First quarter**

- SF – Christian McCaffrey 1-yard run (Jake Moody kick), 9:07. 49ers 7–0. **Drive: 8 plays, 62 yards, 4:16.**

**Second quarter**

- SF – Christian McCaffrey 18-yard run (Jake Moody kick), 14:14. 49ers 14–0. **Drive: 9 plays, 75 yards, 5:09.**
- ARI – Matt Prater 38-yard field goal, 8:14. 49ers 14–3. **Drive: 13 plays, 40 yards, 6:00.**
- SF – Christian McCaffrey 6-yard pass from Brock Purdy (Jake Moody kick), 5:22. 49ers 21–3. **Drive: 5 plays, 75 yards, 2:52.**
- ARI – Michael Wilson 16-yard pass from Joshua Dobbs (Matt Prater kick), 9:07. 49ers 21–10. **Drive: 13 plays, 87 yards, 4:59.**

**Third quarter**

- ARI – Michael Wilson 8-yard pass from Joshua Dobbs (run failed), 4:12. 49ers 21–16. **Drive: 11 plays, 99 yards, 6:25.**

**Fourth quarter**

- SF – Christian McCaffrey 2-yard run (Jake Moody kick), 14:22. 49ers 28–16. **Drive: 8 plays, 75 yards, 4:50.**
- SF – Brock Purdy 1-yard run (Jake Moody kick), 1:50. 49ers 35–16. **Drive: 14 plays, 77 yards, 7:14.**

**Top passers**

- ARI – Joshua Dobbs – 28/41, 265 yards, 2 TD
- SF – Brock Purdy – 20/21, 283 yards, TD

**Top rushers**

- ARI – James Conner – 11 rushes, 52 yards
- SF – Christian McCaffrey – 20 rushes, 106 yards, 3 TD

**Top receivers**

- ARI – Marquise Brown – 7 receptions, 96 yards
- SF – Brandon Aiyuk – 6 receptions, 148 yards

==== Week 5: vs. Cincinnati Bengals ====
Week 5: Cincinnati Bengals at Arizona Cardinals – Game summary

Quarter	1	2	3	4	Total
**Bengals**	10	7	7	10	**34**
Cardinals	0	14	6	0	**20**

at State Farm Stadium, Glendale, Arizona

- Date: October 8
- Game time: 1:05 p.m. MST
- Game weather: None (retractable roof closed)
- Game attendance: 62,651
- Referee: Clay Martin
- TV announcers (Fox): Kevin Kugler, Mark Sanchez and Laura Okmin
- Recap, Game Book

Game information

**First quarter**

- CIN – Ja'Marr Chase 2-yard pass from Joe Burrow (Evan McPherson kick), 7:09. Bengals 7–0. **Drive: 11 plays, 64 yards, 6:10.**
- CIN – Evan McPherson 40-yard field goal, 1:46. Bengals 10–0. **Drive: 8 plays, 26 yards, 4:05.**

**Second quarter**

- ARI – Marquise Brown 25-yard pass from Joshua Dobbs (Matt Prater kick), 12:25. Bengals 10–7. **Drive: 9 plays, 75 yards, 4:21.**
- ARI – Zach Ertz 4-yard pass from Joshua Dobbs (Matt Prater kick), 8:28. Cardinals 14–10. **Drive: 5 plays, 49 yards, 2:13.**
- CIN – Cam Taylor-Britt 11-yard interception return (Evan McPherson kick), 1:23. Bengals 17–14.

**Third quarter**

- CIN – Ja'Marr Chase 63-yard pass from Joe Burrow (Evan McPherson kick), 13:39. Bengals 24–14. **Drive: 3 plays, 75 yards, 1:21.**
- ARI – Emari Demercado 11-yard run (kick failed), 7:33. Bengals 24–20. **Drive: 11 plays, 75 yards, 6:06.**

**Fourth quarter**

- CIN – Ja'Marr Chase 3-yard pass from Joe Burrow (Evan McPherson kick), 7:48. Bengals 31–20. **Drive: 1 play, 83 yards, 8:55.**
- CIN – Evan McPherson 40-yard field goal, 6:33. Bengals 34–20. **Drive: 5 plays, 6 yards, 1:08.**

**Top passers**

- CIN – Joe Burrow – 36/46, 317 yards, 3 TD, INT
- ARI – Joshua Dobbs – 15/32, 166 yards, 2 TD, 2 INT

**Top rushers**

- CIN – Joe Mixon – 25 rushes, 81 yards
- ARI – Rondale Moore – 3 rushes, 50 yards

**Top receivers**

- CIN – Ja'Marr Chase – 15 receptions, 192 yards, 3 TD
- ARI – Marquise Brown – 4 receptions, 61 yards, TD

The Cardinals recorded their first home loss to the Bengals.

==== Week 6: at Los Angeles Rams ====
Week 6: Arizona Cardinals at Los Angeles Rams – Game summary

Quarter	1	2	3	4	Total
Cardinals	3	6	0	0	**9**
**Rams**	3	3	10	10	**26**

at SoFi Stadium, Inglewood, California

- Date: October 15
- Game time: 1:25 p.m. MST & PDT
- Game weather: Sunny, 82 °F (28 °C) (retractable roof open)
- Game attendance: 71,202
- Referee: Ronald Torbert
- TV announcers (Fox): Kenny Albert, Jonathan Vilma and Shannon Spake
- Recap, Game Book

Game information

**First quarter**

- ARI – Matt Prater 55-yard field goal, 11:25. Cardinals 3-0. **Drive: 8 plays, 38 yards, 3:35.**
- LAR – Brett Maher 29-yard field goal, 0:11. Tied 3-3. **Drive: 6 plays, 48 yards, 1:56.**

**Second quarter**

- ARI – Matt Prater 32-yard field goal, 12:35. Cardinals 6-3. **Drive: 4 plays, 3 yards, 0:52.**
- ARI – Matt Prater 27-yard field goal, 0:43. Cardinals 9-3. **Drive: 11 plays, 63 yards, 4:22.**
- LAR – Brett Maher 35-yard field goal, 0:04. Cardinals 9-6. **Drive: 5 plays, 58 yards, 0:39.**

**Third quarter**

- LAR – Cooper Kupp 13-yard pass from Matthew Stafford (Brett Maher kick), 8:57. Rams 13-9. **Drive: 10 plays, 75 yards, 6:03.**
- LAR – Brett Maher 25-yard field goal, 2:44. Rams 16-9. **Drive: 8 plays, 80 yards, 4:31.**

**Fourth quarter**

- LAR – Kyren Williams 5-yard run (Brett Maher kick), 8:19. Rams 23-9. **Drive: 12 plays, 88 yards, 6:35.**
- LAR – Brett Maher 43-yard field goal, 4:37. Rams 26-9. **Drive: 4 plays, 8 yards, 1:38.**

**Top passers**

- ARI – Joshua Dobbs – 21/41, 235 yards, INT
- LAR – Matthew Stafford – 15/24, 226 yards, TD

**Top rushers**

- ARI – Joshua Dobbs – 7 rushes, 47 yards
- LAR – Kyren Williams – 20 rushes, 158 yards, TD

**Top receivers**

- ARI – Trey McBride – 4 receptions, 62 yards
- LAR – Cooper Kupp – 7 receptions, 148 yards, TD

==== Week 7: at Seattle Seahawks ====
Week 7: Arizona Cardinals at Seattle Seahawks – Game summary

Quarter	1	2	3	4	Total
Cardinals	3	7	0	0	**10**
**Seahawks**	7	7	3	3	**20**

at Lumen Field, Seattle, Washington

- Date: October 22
- Game time: 1:05 p.m. MST & PDT
- Game weather: Cloudy, 56 °F (13 °C)
- Game attendance: 68,781
- Referee: Scott Novak
- TV announcers (Fox): Kenny Albert, Jonathan Vilma and Shannon Spake
- Recap, Game Book

Game information

**First quarter**

- SEA – Jaxon Smith-Njigba 28-yard pass from Geno Smith (Jason Myers kick), 4:47. Seahawks 7-0. **Drive: 3 plays, 61 yards, 1:01.**
- ARI – Matt Prater 44-yard field goal, 1:57. Seahawks 7-3. **Drive: 4 plays, 4 yards, 1:22.**

**Second quarter**

- ARI – Joshua Dobbs 25-yard run (Matt Prater kick), 9:11. Cardinals 10-7. **Drive: 8 plays, 80 yards, 4:27.**
- SEA – Jake Bobo 18-yard pass from Geno Smith (Jason Myers kick), 4:41. Seahawks 14-10. **Drive: 9 plays, 76 yards, 4:30.**

**Third quarter**

- SEA – Jason Myers 21-yard field goal, 7:37. Seahawks 17-10. **Drive: 13 plays, 72 yards, 7:23.**

**Fourth quarter**

- SEA – Jason Myers 48-yard field goal, 2:17. Seahawks 20-10. **Drive: 9 plays, 25 yards, 2:41.**

**Top passers**

- ARI – Joshua Dobbs – 19/33, 146 yards
- SEA – Geno Smith – 18/24, 219 yards, 2 TD, INT

**Top rushers**

- ARI – Emari Demercado – 13 rushes, 58 yards
- SEA – Kenneth Walker III – 26 rushes, 105 yards

**Top receivers**

- ARI – Emari Demercado – 4 receptions, 17 yards
- SEA – Jaxon Smith-Njigba – 4 receptions, 63 yards, TD

==== Week 8: vs. Baltimore Ravens ====
Week 8: Baltimore Ravens at Arizona Cardinals – Game summary

Quarter	1	2	3	4	Total
**Ravens**	7	7	7	10	**31**
Cardinals	7	0	0	17	**24**

at State Farm Stadium, Glendale, Arizona

- Date: October 29
- Game time: 1:25 p.m. MST
- Game weather: None (retractable roof closed)
- Game attendance: 63,064
- Referee: Tra Blake
- TV announcers (CBS): Chris Lewis, Ross Tucker and Justin Walters
- Recap, Game Book

Game information

**First quarter**

- ARI – Josh Dobbs 1-yard run (Matt Prater kick), 8:05. Cardinals 7–0. **Drive: 12 plays, 75 yards, 6:55.**
- BAL – Mark Andrews 5-yard pass from Lamar Jackson (Justin Tucker kick), 2:38. Tied 7–7. **Drive: 10 plays, 75 yards, 5:27.**

**Second quarter**

- BAL – Gus Edwards 1-yard rush (Justin Tucker kick), 0:25. Ravens 14–7. **Drive: 6 plays, 43 yards, 1:32.**

**Third quarter**

- BAL – Gus Edwards 7-yard rush (Justin Tucker kick), 0:40. Ravens 21–7. **Drive: 3 plays, 23 yards, 1:05.**

**Fourth quarter**

- BAL – Justin Tucker 48-yard field goal, 9:27. Ravens 24–7. **Drive: 8 plays, 37 yards, 4:49.**
- ARI – Trey McBride 17-yard pass from Josh Dobbs (Josh Dobbs run), 6:32. Ravens 24-15. **Drive: 9 plays, 75 yards, 2:55.**
- BAL – Gus Edwards 1-yard rush (Justin Tucker kick), 2:51. Ravens 31–15. **Drive: 9 plays, 75 yards, 3:41.**
- ARI – Marquise Brown 1-yard pass from Josh Dobbs (pass failed), 1:14. Ravens 31-21. **Drive: 10 plays, 75 yards, 1:31.**
- ARI – Matt Prater 47-yard field goal, 0:26. Ravens 31–24. **Drive: 5 plays, 21 yards, 0:48.**

**Top passers**

- BAL – Lamar Jackson – 18/27, 157 yards, TD
- ARI – Josh Dobbs – 25/37, 208 yards, 2 TD, 2 INT

**Top rushers**

- BAL – Gus Edwards – 19 rushes, 80 yards, 3 TD
- ARI – Emari Demercado – 20 rushes, 78 yards

**Top receivers**

- BAL – Mark Andrews – 4 receptions, 40 yards, TD
- ARI – Trey McBride – 10 receptions, 95 yards, TD

==== Week 9: at Cleveland Browns ====
Week 9: Arizona Cardinals at Cleveland Browns – Game summary

Quarter	1	2	3	4	Total
Cardinals	0	0	0	0	**0**
**Browns**	0	13	7	7	**27**

at Cleveland Browns Stadium, Cleveland, Ohio

- Date: November 5
- Game time: 1:00 p.m. EST/11:00 a.m. MST
- Game weather: Sunny, 56 °F (13 °C)
- Game attendance: 67,919
- Referee: Carl Cheffers
- TV announcers (CBS): Spero Dedes, Adam Archuleta and Aditi Kinkhabwala
- Recap, Game Book

Game information

**First quarter**

- No scoring plays.

**Second quarter**

- CLE – Dustin Hopkins 30-yard field goal, 14:15. Browns 3–0. **Drive: 5 plays, 60 yards, 2:46.**
- CLE – Amari Cooper 11-yard pass from Deshaun Watson (Dustin Hopkins kick), 6:48. Browns 10–0. **Drive: 11 plays, 49 yards, 6:22.**
- CLE – Dustin Hopkins 45-yard field goal, 0:00. Browns 13–0. **Drive: 9 plays, 39 yards, 1:44.**

**Third quarter**

- CLE – David Njoku 5-yard pass from Deshaun Watson (Dustin Hopkins kick), 8:07. Browns 20–0. **Drive: 3 plays, 11 yards, 1:24.**

**Fourth quarter**

- CLE – Kareem Hunt 3-yard run (Dustin Hopkins kick), 7:48. Browns 27–0. **Drive: 4 plays, 56 yards, 2:13.**

**Top passers**

- ARI – Clayton Tune – 11/20, 58 yards, 2 INT
- CLE – Deshaun Watson – 19/30, 219 yards, 2 TD

**Top rushers**

- ARI – Clayton Tune – 5 rushes, 28 yards
- CLE – Jerome Ford – 20 rushes, 44 yards

**Top receivers**

- ARI – Marquise Brown – 4 receptions, 24 yards
- CLE – Amari Cooper – 5 receptions, 139 yards, TD

==== Week 10: vs. Atlanta Falcons ====
Week 10: Atlanta Falcons at Arizona Cardinals – Game summary

Quarter	1	2	3	4	Total
Falcons	0	14	3	6	**23**
**Cardinals**	3	9	10	3	**25**

at State Farm Stadium, Glendale, Arizona

- Date: November 12
- Game time: 2:05 p.m. MST
- Game weather: None (retractable roof closed)
- Game attendance: 62,861
- Referee: Craig Wrolstad
- TV announcers (CBS): Spero Dedes, Adam Archuleta and Amanda Renner
- Recap, Game Book

Game information

**First quarter**

- ARI – Matt Prater 51-yard field goal, 4:48. Cardinals 3–0. **Drive: 15 plays, 63 yards, 7:48.**

**Second quarter**

- ATL – Scotty Miller 2-yard pass from Taylor Heinicke (Younghoe Koo kick), 13:27. Falcons 7–3. **Drive: 12 plays, 75 yards, 6:21.**
- ARI – Matt Prater 46-yard field goal, 10:32. Falcons 7–6. **Drive: 6 plays, 47 yards, 2:55.**
- ATL – Bijan Robinson 5-yard run (Younghoe Koo kick), 4:07. Falcons 14–6. **Drive: 13 plays, 75 yards, 6:25.**
- ARI – Kyler Murray 6-yard run (pass failed), 0:10. Falcons 14–12. **Drive: 9 plays, 75 yards, 3:57.**

**Third quarter**

- ARI – Matt Prater 56-yard field goal, 9:16. Cardinals 15–14. **Drive: 9 plays, 38 yards, 4:49.**
- ATL – Younghoe Koo 36-yard field goal, 5:18. Falcons 17–15. **Drive: 4 plays, 3 yards, 1:17.**
- ARI – Clayton Tune 1-yard run (Matt Prater kick), 0:19. Cardinals 22–17. **Drive: 3 plays, 21 yards, 0:49.**

**Fourth quarter**

- ATL – Desmond Ridder 9-yard run (pass failed), 2:33. Falcons 23–22. **Drive: 8 plays, 74 yards, 3:10.**
- ARI – Matt Prater 23-yard field goal, 0:00. Cardinals 25–23. **Drive: 11 plays, 70 yards, 2:33.**

**Top passers**

- ATL – Taylor Heinicke – 8/15, 55 yards, TD
- ARI – Kyler Murray – 19/32, 249 yards, INT

**Top rushers**

- ATL – Bijan Robinson – 22 rushes, 95 yards, TD
- ARI – James Conner – 16 rushes, 73 yards

**Top receivers**

- ATL – Drake London – 3 receptions, 36 yards
- ARI – Trey McBride – 8 receptions, 131 yards

This game marked the return of quarterback Kyler Murray, who had been out since tearing his ACL on December 12, 2022, against the New England Patriots.

==== Week 11: at Houston Texans ====
Week 11: Arizona Cardinals at Houston Texans – Game summary

Quarter	1	2	3	4	Total
Cardinals	10	0	6	0	**16**
**Texans**	7	14	0	0	**21**

at NRG Stadium, Houston, Texas

- Date: November 19
- Game time: 12:00 p.m. CST/11:00 a.m. MST
- Game weather: None (retractable roof closed)
- Game attendance: 70,247
- Referee: Alex Kemp
- TV announcers (CBS): Tom McCarthy, James Lofton, Jay Feely and Tiffany Blackmon
- Recap, Game Book

Game information

**First quarter**

- ARI – Rondale Moore 48-yard pass from Kyler Murray (Matt Prater kick), 13:28. Cardinals 7–0. **Drive: 3 plays, 75 yards, 1:32.**
- HOU – Dalton Schultz 20-yard pass from C. J. Stroud (Matt Ammendola kick), 5:48. Tied 7–7. **Drive: 5 plays, 61 yards, 1:57.**
- ARI – Matt Prater 57-yard field goal, 1:21. Cardinals 10–7. **Drive: 9 plays, 36 yards, 4:27.**

**Second quarter**

- HOU – Devin Singletary 11-yard run (Matt Ammendola kick), 11:20. Texans 14–10. **Drive: 10 plays, 75 yards, 5:01.**
- HOU – Tank Dell 40-yard pass from C. J. Stroud (Matt Ammendola kick), 0:26. Texans 21–10. **Drive: 6 plays, 74 yards, 1:49.**

**Third quarter**

- ARI – Kyler Murray 1-yard run (run failed), 2:52. Texans 21–16. **Drive: 12 plays, 62 yards, 6:23.**

**Fourth quarter**

- No scoring plays.

**Top passers**

- ARI – Kyler Murray – 20/30, 214 yards, TD, INT
- HOU – C. J. Stroud – 27/37, 336 yards, 2 TD, 3 INT

**Top rushers**

- ARI – James Conner – 14 rushes, 62 yards
- HOU – Devin Singletary – 22 rushes, 112 yards, TD

**Top receivers**

- ARI – Greg Dortch – 6 receptions, 76 yards
- HOU – Tank Dell – 8 receptions, 149 yards, TD

==== Week 12: vs. Los Angeles Rams ====
Week 12: Los Angeles Rams at Arizona Cardinals – Game summary

Quarter	1	2	3	4	Total
**Rams**	7	14	3	13	**37**
Cardinals	8	0	0	6	**14**

at State Farm Stadium, Glendale, Arizona

- Date: November 26
- Game time: 2:05 p.m. MST
- Game weather: None (retractable roof closed)
- Game attendance: 62,177
- Referee: Shawn Smith
- TV announcers (Fox): Chris Myers, Robert Smith and Jen Hale
- Recap, Game Book

Game information

**First quarter**

- LAR – Tyler Higbee 7-yard pass from Matthew Stafford (Lucas Havrisik kick), 11:18. Rams 7–0. **Drive: 9 plays, 75 yards, 3:42.**
- ARI – Kyler Murray 2-yard run (Clayton Tune run), 4:50. Cardinals 8–7. **Drive: 12 plays, 75 yards, 6:28.**

**Second quarter**

- LAR – Tyler Higbee 5-yard pass from Matthew Stafford (Lucas Havrisik kick), 9:57. Rams 14–8. **Drive: 8 plays, 51 yards, 4:57.**
- LAR – Kyren Williams 15-yard pass from Matthew Stafford (Lucas Havrisik kick), 0:59. Rams 21–8. **Drive: 4 plays, 48 yards, 0:57.**

**Third quarter**

- LAR – Lucas Havrisik 24-yard field goal, 7:33. Rams 24–8. **Drive: 7 plays, 72 yards, 3:49.**

**Fourth quarter**

- LAR – Kyren Williams 3-yard pass from Matthew Stafford (Lucas Havrisik kick), 12:41. Rams 31–8. **Drive: 13 plays, 54 yards, 7:22.**
- LAR – Royce Freeman 23-yard run (kick failed), 8:19. Rams 37–8. **Drive: 5 plays, 38 yards, 3:01.**
- ARI – Greg Dortch 6-yard pass from Kyler Murray (pass failed), 5:12. Rams 37–14. **Drive: 10 plays, 75 yards, 3:07.**

**Top passers**

- LAR – Matthew Stafford – 25/33, 229 yards, 4 TD, INT
- ARI – Kyler Murray – 27/45, 256 yards, TD

**Top rushers**

- LAR – Kyren Williams – 16 rushes, 143 yards
- ARI – James Conner – 6 rushes, 27 yards

**Top receivers**

- LAR – Tutu Atwell – 3 receptions, 76 yards
- ARI – Marquise Brown – 6 receptions, 88 yards

==== Week 13: at Pittsburgh Steelers ====
Week 13: Arizona Cardinals at Pittsburgh Steelers – Game summary

Quarter	1	2	3	4	Total
**Cardinals**	3	7	7	7	**24**
Steelers	3	0	0	7	**10**

at Acrisure Stadium, Pittsburgh, Pennsylvania

- Date: December 3
- Game time: 1:00 p.m. EST/11:00 a.m. MST
- Game weather: Mostly cloudy, 56 °F (13 °C)
- Game attendance: 66,436
- Referee: Land Clark
- TV announcers (CBS): Kevin Harlan, Trent Green and Melanie Collins
- Recap, Game Book

Game information

**First quarter**

- PIT – Chris Boswell 29-yard field goal, 12:01. Steelers 3–0. **Drive: 7 plays, 65 yards, 2:59.**
- ARI – Matt Prater 51-yard field goal, 5:44. Tied 3–3. **Drive: 7 plays, 32 yards, 3:32.**

**Second quarter**

- ARI – Trey McBride 5-yard pass from Kyler Murray (Matt Prater kick), 0:15. Cardinals 10–3. **Drive: 15 plays, 99 yards, 4:36.**

**Third quarter**

- ARI – James Conner 1-yard run (Matt Prater kick), 7:18. Cardinals 17–3. **Drive: 7 plays, 21 yards, 3:11.**

**Fourth quarter**

- ARI – James Conner 9-yard run (Matt Prater kick), 8:28. Cardinals 24–3. **Drive: 4 plays, 33 yards, 2:08.**
- PIT – Diontae Johnson 2-yard pass from Mitchell Trubisky (Chris Boswell kick), 4:25. Cardinals 24–10. **Drive: 10 plays, 75 yards, 4:03.**

**Top passers**

- ARI – Kyler Murray – 13/23, 145 yards, TD
- PIT – Mitchell Trubisky – 11/17, 117 yards, TD

**Top rushers**

- ARI – James Conner – 25 rushes, 105 yards, 2 TD
- PIT – Najee Harris – 16 rushes, 63 yards

**Top receivers**

- ARI – Terry McBride – 8 receptions, 89 yards, TD
- PIT – George Pickens – 4 receptions, 86 yards

In an upset, the Cardinals defeated the Steelers to record their first road win in Pittsburgh since the 1969 season, when they were known as the St. Louis Cardinals.

==== Week 15: vs. San Francisco 49ers ====
Week 15: San Francisco 49ers at Arizona Cardinals – Game summary

Quarter	1	2	3	4	Total
**49ers**	14	7	14	10	**45**
Cardinals	7	6	3	13	**29**

at State Farm Stadium, Glendale, Arizona

- Date: December 17
- Game time: 2:05 p.m. MST
- Game weather: Sunny, 76 °F (24 °C) (retractable roof open)
- Game attendance: 63,967
- Referee: Scott Novak
- TV announcers (CBS): Ian Eagle, Charles Davis and Evan Washburn
- Recap, Game Book

Game information

**First quarter**

- ARI – James Conner 2-yard run (Matt Prater kick), 10:40. Cardinals 7–0. **Drive: 7 plays, 75 yards, 4:20.**
- SF – Deebo Samuel 12-yard pass from Brock Purdy (Jake Moody kick), 6:33. Tied 7–7. **Drive: 8 plays, 75 yards, 4:07.**
- SF – Charvarius Ward 66-yard interception return (Jake Moody kick), 4:22. 49ers 14–7.

**Second quarter**

- ARI – Matt Prater 58-yard field goal, 14:11. 49ers 14–10. **Drive: 8 plays, 35 yards, 5:11.**
- ARI – Matt Prater 43-yard field goal, 6:14. 49ers 14–13. **Drive: 11 plays, 44 yards, 6:15.**
- SF – Christian McCaffrey 5-yard pass from Brock Purdy (Jake Moody kick), 1:14. 49ers 21–13. **Drive: 10 plays, 75 yards, 5:00.**

**Third quarter**

- SF – Christian McCaffrey 41-yard pass from Brock Purdy (Jake Moody kick), 13:18. 49ers 28–13. **Drive: 4 plays, 75 yards, 1:42.**
- ARI – Matt Prater 28-yard field goal, 4:20. 49ers 28–16. **Drive: 12 plays, 81 yards, 6:18.**
- SF – Christian McCaffrey 1-yard run (Jake Moody kick), 1:08. 49ers 35–16. **Drive: 6 plays, 60 yards, 3:12.**

**Fourth quarter**

- ARI – Emari Demercado 49-yard run (two-point pass failed), 11:30. 49ers 35–22. **Drive: 8 plays, 75 yards, 4:38.**
- SF – Deebo Samuel 19-yard pass from Brock Purdy (Jake Moody kick), 7:09. 49ers 42–22. **Drive: 7 plays, 75 yards, 4:21.**
- SF – Jake Moody 43-yard field goal, 3:09. 49ers 45–22. **Drive: 6 plays, 22 yards, 3:09.**
- ARI – Elijah Higgins 8-yard pass from Kyler Murray (Matt Prater kick), 0:47. 49ers 45–29. **Drive: 12 plays, 75 yards, 2:22.**

**Top passers**

- SF – Brock Purdy – 16/25, 242 yards, 4 TD
- ARI – Kyler Murray – 26/39, 211 yards, TD, 2 INT

**Top rushers**

- SF – Christian McCaffrey – 18 rushes, 115 yards, TD
- ARI – James Connor – 14 rushes, 86 yards, TD

**Top receivers**

- SF – Christian McCaffrey – 5 receptions, 72 yards, 2 TD
- ARI – Trey McBride – 10 receptions, 102 yards

The Cardinals came off their bye week to play at home against their NFC West rival, the 49ers while still being in playoff contention. The Cardinals would end up losing to the 49ers by 16, which resulted in them being eliminated from playoff contention for the second consecutive year.

==== Week 16: at Chicago Bears ====
Week 16: Arizona Cardinals at Chicago Bears – Game summary

Quarter	1	2	3	4	Total
Cardinals	0	7	3	6	**16**
**Bears**	7	14	3	3	**27**

at Soldier Field, Chicago, Illinois

- Date: December 24
- Game time: 3:25 p.m. CST/2:25 p.m. MST
- Game weather: Mostly cloudy, 52 °F (11 °C)
- Game attendance: 59,978
- Referee: John Hussey
- TV announcers (Fox): Kevin Kugler, Mark Sanchez and Laura Okmin
- Recap, Game Book

Game information

**First quarter**

- CHI – Justin Fields 3-yard run (Cairo Santos kick), 6:16. Bears 7–0. **Drive: 6 plays, 74 yard, 2:56.**

**Second quarter**

- CHI – Khalil Herbert 11-yard run (Cairo Santos kick), 12:54. Bears 14–0. **Drive: 11 plays, 90 yard, 5:57.**
- CHI – Marcedes Lewis 1-yard pass from Justin Fields (Cairo Santos kick), 7:12. Bears 21–0. **Drive: 8 plays, 54 yards, 4:41.**
- ARI – James Conner 16-yard pass from Kyler Murray (Matt Prater kick), 2:27. Bears 21–7. **Drive: 9 plays, 75 yards, 4:45.**

**Third quarter**

- ARI – Matt Prater 55-yard field goal, 12:12. Bears 21–10. **Drive: 5 plays, 20 yards, 2:48.'**
- CHI – Cairo Santos 49-yard field goal, 1:04. Bears 24–10. **Drive: 10 plays, 49 yards, 5:35.**

**Fourth quarter**

- ARI – Greg Dortch 38-yard pass from Kyler Murray (pass failed), 6:37. Bears 24–16. **Drive: 8 plays, 80 yards, 3:45.**
- CHI – Cairo Santos 29-yard field goal, 1:02. Bears 27–16. **Drive: 7 plays, 16 yards, 1:55.**

**Top passers**

- ARI – Kyler Murray – 24/38, 230 yards, 2 TD
- CHI – Justin Fields – 15/27, 170 yards, TD, INT

**Top rushers**

- ARI – James Conner – 12 rushes, 45 yards
- CHI – Khalil Herbert – 20 rushes, 112 yards, TD

**Top receivers**

- ARI – Emari Demercado – 7 receptions, 40 yards
- CHI – Cole Kmet – 4 receptions, 107 yards

==== Week 17: at Philadelphia Eagles ====
Week 17: Arizona Cardinals at Philadelphia Eagles – Game summary

Quarter	1	2	3	4	Total
**Cardinals**	3	3	15	14	**35**
Eagles	7	14	0	10	**31**

at Lincoln Financial Field, Philadelphia, Pennsylvania

- Date: December 31
- Game time: 1:00 p.m. EST/11:00 a.m. MST
- Game weather: Partly cloudy, 45 °F (7 °C)
- Game attendance: 69,879
- Referee: Bill Vinovich
- TV announcers (Fox): Joe Davis, Daryl Johnston and Pam Oliver
- Recap, Game Book

Game information

**First quarter**

- ARI – Matt Prater 28-yard field goal, 5:12. Cardinals 3-0. **Drive: 14 plays, 64 yards, 7:46.**
- PHI – Julio Jones 12-yard pass from Jalen Hurts (Jake Elliott kick), 0:42. Eagles 7-3. **Drive: 9 plays, 69 yards, 4:33.**

**Second quarter**

- PHI – Sydney Brown 99-yard interception return (Jake Elliott kick), 12:01. Eagles 14-3.
- ARI – Matt Prater 34-yard field goal, 1:53. Eagles 14-6. **Drive: 16 plays, 63 yards, 9:54.**
- PHI – Julio Jones 22-yard pass from Jalen Hurts (Jake Elliott kick), 0:24. Eagles 21-6. **Drive: 9 plays, 75 yards, 1:54.**

**Third quarter**

- ARI – Michael Carter 6-yard pass from Kyler Murray (Matt Prater kick), 8:48. Eagles 21-13. **Drive: 10 plays, 75 yards, 6:18.**
- ARI – James Conner 5-yard pass from Kyler Murray (Kyler Murray-Michael Wilson pass), 2:10. Tied 21-21. **Drive: 9 plays, 77 yards, 5:03.**

**Fourth quarter**

- PHI – Dallas Goedert 9-yard pass from Jalen Hurts (Jake Elliott kick), 10:02. Eagles 28-21. **Drive: 13 plays, 70 yards, 7:06.**
- ARI – Michael Wilson 5-yard pass from Kyler Murray (Matt Prater kick), 5:30. Tied 28-28. **Drive: 8 plays, 48 yards, 4:29.**
- PHI – Jake Elliott 43-yard field goal, 2:37. Eagles 31-28. **Drive: 6 plays, 24 yards, 2:53.**
- ARI – James Conner 2-yard run (Matt Prater kick), 0:36. Cardinals 35-31. **Drive: 7 plays, 70 yards, 2:01.**

**Top passers**

- ARI – Kyler Murray – 25/31, 232 yards, 3 TD, INT
- PHI – Jalen Hurts – 18/23, 167 yards, 3 TD, INT

**Top rushers**

- ARI – James Conner – 26 rushes, 128 yards, TD
- PHI – D'Andre Swift – 13 rushes, 61 yards

**Top receivers**

- ARI – Greg Dortch – 7 receptions, 82 yards
- PHI – A. J. Brown – 4 receptions, 53 yards

==== Week 18: vs. Seattle Seahawks ====
Week #: Seattle Seahawks at Arizona Cardinals – Game summary

Quarter	1	2	3	4	Total
**Seahawks**	3	10	0	8	**21**
Cardinals	0	6	7	7	**20**

at State Farm Stadium, Glendale, Arizona

- Date: January 7
- Game time: 2:25 p.m. MST
- Game weather: None (retractable roof closed)
- Game attendance: 63,197
- Referee: Adrian Hill
- TV announcers (Fox): Kevin Kugler, Mark Sanchez and Laura Okmin
- Recap, Game Book

=== Standings ===
==== Division ====
NFC West
	W	L	T	PCT	DIV	CONF	PF	PA	STK
^{(1)} San Francisco 49ers	12	5	0	.706	5–1	10–2	491	298	L1
^{(6)} Los Angeles Rams	10	7	0	.588	5–1	8–4	404	377	W4
Seattle Seahawks	9	8	0	.529	2–4	7–5	364	402	W1
Arizona Cardinals	4	13	0	.235	0–6	3–9	330	455	L1

==== Conference ====
NFC
#	Team	Division	W	L	T	PCT	DIV	CONF	SOS	SOV	STK
**Division leaders**
1 (Note: San Francisco finished ahead of Dallas and Detroit based on conference record, claiming the No. 1 seed.)	San Francisco 49ers	West	12	5	0	.706	5–1	10–2	.509	.475	L1
2 (Note: Dallas claimed the No. 2 seed over Detroit based on head-to-head victory.)	Dallas Cowboys	East	12	5	0	.706	5–1	9–3	.446	.392	W2
3	Detroit Lions	North	12	5	0	.706	4–2	8–4	.481	.436	W1
4 (Note: Tampa Bay finished ahead of New Orleans in the NFC South based on common record. (Tampa Bay is 8–4 against Minnesota, Chicago, Detroit, Green Bay, Atlanta, Carolina, Houston, Tennessee, Jacksonville, and Indianapolis, while New Orleans is 6–6 against the same teams.))	Tampa Bay Buccaneers	South	9	8	0	.529	4–2	7–5	.481	.379	W1
**Wild cards**
5	Philadelphia Eagles	East	11	6	0	.647	4–2	7–5	.481	.476	L2
6	Los Angeles Rams	West	10	7	0	.588	5–1	8–4	.529	.453	W4
7 (Note: Green Bay and Seattle finished ahead of New Orleans based on conference record.) (Note: Green Bay finished ahead of Seattle based on strength of victory, claiming the 7th and final playoff spot.)	Green Bay Packers	North	9	8	0	.529	4–2	7–5	.474	.458	W3
**Did not qualify for the postseason**
8	Seattle Seahawks	West	9	8	0	.529	2–4	7–5	.512	.392	W1
9	New Orleans Saints	South	9	8	0	.529	4–2	6–6	.433	.340	W2
10 (Note: Minnesota finished ahead of Atlanta based on head-to-head victory. Division tie break was initially used to eliminate Chicago (see below).) (Note: Minnesota finished ahead of Chicago based on common record. (Minnesota is 5–7 against Tampa Bay, Los Angeles Chargers, Carolina, Kansas City, Green Bay, Atlanta, New Orleans, Denver, Las Vegas, and Detroit, while Chicago is 4–8 against the same teams.))	Minnesota Vikings	North	7	10	0	.412	2–4	6–6	.509	.454	L4
11 (Note: Chicago finished ahead of Atlanta based on head-to-head victory.)	Chicago Bears	North	7	10	0	.412	2–4	6–6	.464	.370	L1
12	Atlanta Falcons	South	7	10	0	.412	3–3	4–8	.429	.462	L2
13	New York Giants	East	6	11	0	.353	3–3	5–7	.512	.353	W1
14 (Note: Washington finished ahead of Arizona based on head-to-head victory.)	Washington Commanders	East	4	13	0	.235	0–6	2–10	.512	.338	L8
15	Arizona Cardinals	West	4	13	0	.235	0–6	3–9	.561	.588	L1
16	Carolina Panthers	South	2	15	0	.118	1–5	1–11	.522	.500	L3
**Tiebreakers** (Note: When breaking ties for three or more teams under the NFL's rules, they are first broken within divisions, then comparing only the highest-ranked remaining team from each division.)

== Statistics ==
=== Starters ===
Offense

Pos.	Name	GS
QB	Kyler Murray; Joshua Dobbs; Clayton Tune	8; 8; 1
RB	James Conner; Emari Demercado; Keaontay Ingram	13; 2; 1
WR	Marquise Brown; Michael Wilson; Rondale Moore; Greg Dortch; Zach Pascal	14; 12; 8; 4; 1
TE	Trey McBride; Geoff Swaim; Zach Ertz; Elijah Higgins	12; 8; 7; 2
LT	D.J. Humphries; Kelvin Beachum	15; 2
LG	Elijah Wilkinson; Trystan Colon; Carter O'Donnell; Dennis Daley	9; 4; 3; 1
C	Hjalte Froholdt	17
RG	Will Hernandez	17
RT	Paris Johnson	17

Defense

Pos.	Name	GS
DE	L.J. Collier; Dante Stills; Kevin Strong	1; 8; 8
NT	Leki Fotu; Roy Lopez; Kevin Strong	9; 5; 3
DE	Jonathan Ledbetter; Carlos Watkins; Naquan Jones; Phil Hoskins	12; 1; 1; 1
OLB	Dennis Gardeck; Victor Dimukeje	8; 6
ILB	Kyzir White; Zeke Turner	11; 1
ILB	Josh Woods; Krys Barnes; Owen Pappoe	7; 6; 1
OLB	Zaven Collins	17
CB	Antonio Hamilton; Kei'Trel Clark	9; 7
CB	Marco Wilson; Garrett Williams	11; 6
SS	Jalen Thompson; Andre Chachere	15; 2
FS	Budda Baker; K'Von Wallace	12; 5
Hybrid DB	Starling Thomas V Andre Chachere; Divaad Wilson	7; 3; 1

Special Teams

Pos.	Name	GS
P	Blake Gillikin; Nolan Cooney	13; 4
K	Matt Prater	17
LS	Aaron Brewer	17

=== Individual leaders ===
Category	Player(s)	Value
Passing yards	Kyler Murray	1,799
Passing touchdowns	Kyler Murray	10
Rushing yards	James Conner	1,040
Rushing touchdowns	James Conner	7
Receptions	Trey McBride	81
Receiving yards	Trey McBride	825
Receiving touchdowns	Marquise Brown	11
Kickoff return yards	Greg Dortch	360
Punt return yards	Greg Dortch	275
Tackles	Kyzir White	90
Sacks	Dennis Gardeck	6.0
Forced fumbles	Joey Blount	2
Interceptions	Jalen Thompson	4
Kicking - field goals	Matt Prater	28/33, 84.8%
Kicking - extra points	Matt Prater	22/23, 95.7%

=== Team rankings ===
Category	Value	NFL rank (out of 32)
Passing attempts	555	
Passing completions	355	24th
Passing yards	3,144	26th
Passing touchdowns	18	24th
Interceptions thrown	12	13th
Rushing attempts	471	13th
Rushing yards	2,365	4th
Rushing touchdowns	17	9th
Rushing yards/attempt	5.0	2nd
Total yards of offense	5,509	19th
Points scored	330	24th
Points allowed	455	31st
Passing yards allowed	3,613	13th
Passing touchdowns allowed	32	30th
Rushing attempts against	521	32nd
Rushing yards allowed	2,434	32nd
Rushing touchdowns allowed	19	27th
Yards/rush attempt allowed	4.7	29th
Interceptions made	11	19th
Fumbles recovered	6	28th
Total yards allowed	6,047	25th

Statistical values are correct through January 7, 2024
