= Joseph Norwood =

Joseph Norwood may refer to:

- Joseph Granville Norwood (1807–1895), American medical doctor and scientist
- Joseph Elias Norwood (1873–?), mayor and state legislator in Mississippi
