= Hampton Lea House =

Historic 1859 house in Amite County, Mississippi, US

- U.S. National Register of Historic Places
- Location within Mississippi
- Location: Lea Road
- Nearest city: Magnolia, Mississippi, U.S.
- Coordinates: 31°06′18″N 90°36′24″W
- Area: 7.2 acres (2.9 ha)
- Built: 1859
- Architectural style: Greek Revival
- NRHP reference No.: 84002120
- Added to NRHP: July 12, 1984

Hampton Lea House is a historic residence and former plantation house in the city of Magnolia, Mississippi in Amite County. The house was added to the National Register of Historic Places on July 12, 1984.

== History ==
The Hampton Lea House was built in 1859 for Hampton Muse Lea (1810–1886). A two-story structure in a Greek Revival style, it has eight rooms and four fireplaces. It was on a 200 acres (81 ha) plantation. As of 1984, the house sits on 7.2 acres (2.9 ha).

The "I" style floorplan shares traits with other Greek Revival homes found in the Piedmont, South Carolina where some Amite residents came from. In 1992, Mississippi's state historical preservation officer said the close similarity to Tanglewood indicated that the house was constructed by the same builder.

Hampton Muse Lea's letters to his son George serving in the American Civil War (1861–1865) were published in the book, Lea Family Civil War Letters (1992), these letters had been discovered in the Hampton Muse Lea home.

== See also ==
- National Register of Historic Places listings in Amite County, Mississippi
