= Ezekiel Turner =

American football player (born 1996)

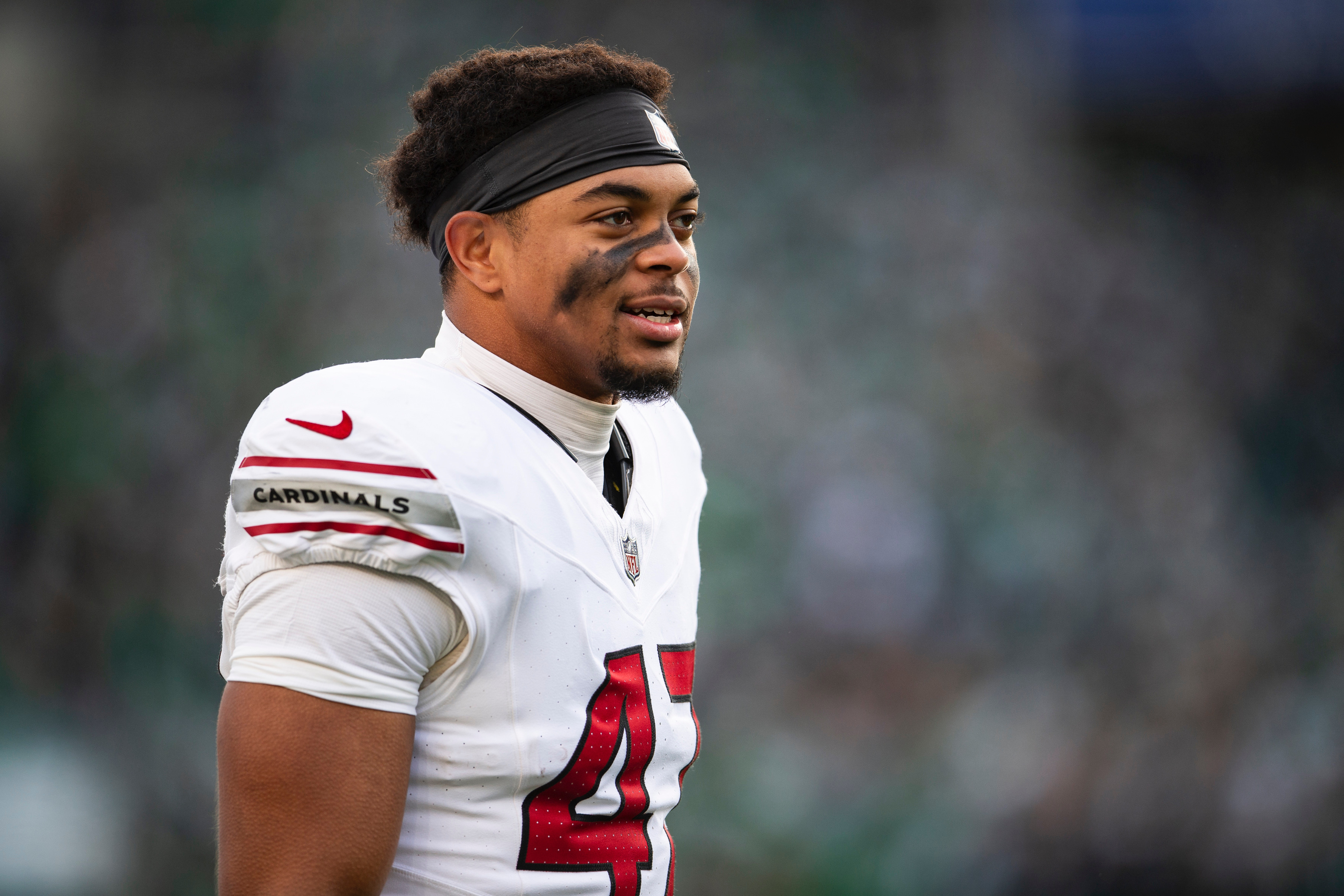
- Turner during the 2023 NFL season

Profile
- Position: Linebacker

Personal information
- Born: June 9, 1996 (age 30); Portsmouth, Virginia, U.S.
- Listed height: 6 ft 2 in (1.88 m)
- Listed weight: 225 lb (102 kg)

Career information
- High school: Glen Burnie (Glen Burnie, Maryland)
- College: Los Angeles Pierce (2014); Washington (2015–2017)
- NFL draft: 2018: undrafted

Career history
- Arizona Cardinals (2018–2023); San Francisco 49ers (2024)*; Houston Texans (2024); Seattle Seahawks (2024)*; Detroit Lions (2024–2025)
- * Offseason or practice squad member only

Awards and highlights
- PFWA All-Rookie Team (2018)

Career NFL statistics as of 2025
- Total tackles: 95
- Sacks: 0.5
- Forced fumbles: 1
- Stats at Pro Football Reference

Ezekiel Turner (born June 9, 1996) is an American professional football linebacker. He played college football for the Washington Huskies as a defensive back and was signed by the Arizona Cardinals as an undrafted free agent following the 2018 NFL draft. Turner was named to the PFWA All-Rookie Team as a special teamer in the 2018 NFL season.

== College career ==
Turner enrolled at the University of Washington in January 2015 and played as a defensive back for the Washington Huskies his remaining college career. He was named Huskies Special Teams Player of the Week four different times in his college career and selected as the co-winner of the Special Teams MVP in the 2016 season. Turner played 12 of 13 games and started one game in his sophomore season. His first start was against Stanford University, where he had a total of seven tackles.

Tuner played in 13 of 14 games during his junior season in 2016. He had a tackle for loss and had an interception in the 2016 Pac-12 Football Championship Game vs. the Colorado Buffaloes. He was selected as the co-winner of the Special Teams MVP award following his junior season after totaling 23 total tackles, 2.5 tackles for a loss and one forced fumble.

Turner played all 13 games and started three games during his senior season in 2017. He totaled five tackles, including one tackle for a loss, in his season opener against the Rutgers.

Turner totaled six tackles and a 41-yard interception return against the Washington State Cougars in the 110th Annual Apple Cup and was named special teams player of the week.

=== College statistics ===
Year	Team	Class	Position	GP	Tackles					Interceptions					Fumbles			
Year	Team	Class	Position	GP	Solo	Ast	Total	Loss	Sack	Int	Yards	Avg	TD	PD	FR	Yards	TD	FF
2015	Washington	Sophomore	DB	12	13	9	22	0.0	0.0	0	0		0	0	0			0
2016	Washington	Junior	DB	13	18	5	23	2.5	0.5	1	0	0.0	0	1	0			1
2017	Washington	Senior	DB	13	40	15	55	1.0	0.0	1	41	41.0	0	3	0			0
Career			DB	38	71	29	100	3.5	0.5	2	41	41.0	0	4	0			1

== Professional career ==
Pre-draft measurables
Height	Weight	Arm length	Hand span	40-yard dash	10-yard split	20-yard split	20-yard shuttle	Three-cone drill	Vertical jump	Broad jump	Bench press
6 ft 1 1/2 in (1.87 m)	212 lb (96 kg)	31 1/2 in (0.80 m)	9 1/4 in (0.23 m)	4.65 s	1.58 s	2.66 s	4.41 s	6.95 s	30.5 in (0.77 m)	9 ft 5 in (2.87 m)	19 reps
All values from Pro Day

=== Arizona Cardinals ===
Turner signed with the Arizona Cardinals as an undrafted free agent on April 30, 2018. He played in all 16 games, finished third in the league with 16 total special teams tackles, and was named to the Pro Football Writers of America All-Rookie Team as a special teamer.

On September 13, 2020, in the season opener, Turner blocked a punt against San Francisco 49ers' punter Mitch Wishnowsky in the first-quarter. Turner's teammate Dennis Gardeck recovered and advanced the ball five yards to the 49ers' 10-yard line. On December 20, 2020, in Week 15, Turner blocked a punt against Philadelphia Eagles' punter Cameron Johnston in the first-quarter. The ball bounced out of bounds at the Eagles' 6-yard line, which ended the Eagles' drive on a turnover on downs. In the fourth-quarter, on fourth-and-2, Turner caught a 26-yard reception from his punter Andy Lee on a successful fake punt resulting in a first-down for the Cardinals.

The Cardinals placed a restricted free agent tender on Turner on March 15, 2021. He signed the one-year contract on April 19. He was placed on injured reserve on October 13, 2021, with a shoulder injury. He was activated on January 17, 2022.

On March 18, 2022, Turner re-signed with the Cardinals.

On March 15, 2023, Turner signed a one-year contract extension with the Cardinals.

=== San Francisco 49ers ===
On March 20, 2024, Turner signed with the San Francisco 49ers. He was released on August 14.

=== Houston Texans ===
On August 28, 2024, Turner was signed to the Houston Texans practice squad. He was released on October 1.

=== Seattle Seahawks ===
On October 8, 2024, Turner was signed to the Seattle Seahawks practice squad. He was released on October 25.

=== Detroit Lions ===
On November 6, 2024, Turner was signed to the Detroit Lions' practice squad; he was promoted to the active roster on November 16. In nine appearances for Detroit, Turner recorded 0.5 sacks and 12 combined tackles.

On August 23, 2025, Turner departed the Lions' preseason finale against the Houston Texans with a "significant" injury, likely an Achilles tear, according to head coach Dan Campbell. On August 27, he was placed on season-ending injured reserve.

== Professional statistics ==
Legend
	Led the league
**Bold**	Career high

=== Regular season ===
Career statistics		Games		Tackles			Snaps				Receiving		
Season	Team	GP	GS	Total	Solo	Ast	Def.	Pct	ST	Pct	Tgt	Rec	Yds
2018	ARI	**16**	**1**	16	**13**	3	18	2%	347	80%	0	0	0
2019	ARI	12	0	7	5	2	4	<1%	293	62%	0	0	0
2020	ARI	**16**	0	14	4	10	6	<1%	**348**	79%	**1**	**1**	**26**
2021	ARI	5	0	4	3	1	5	2%	95	68%	0	0	0
2022	ARI	15	**1**	**22**	12	10	**107**	**11%**	328	81%	0	0	0
2023	ARI	**16**	**1**	20	8	**12**	50	5%	345	**83%**	0	0	0
2024	DET	9	0	12	7	5	111	20%	176	72%	0	0	0
Career		89	3	95	52	43	301	—	1,932	—	1	1	26
