= Owen Pappoe =

American football player (born 2000)

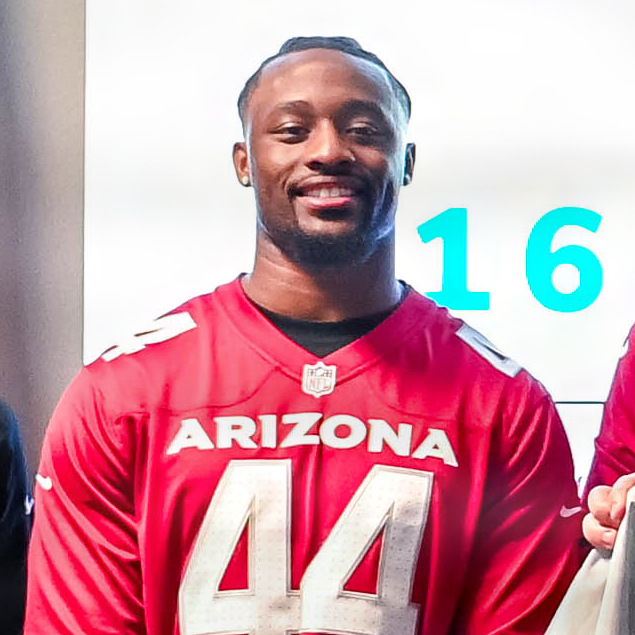
- Pappoe with the Arizona Cardinals in 2025

No. 51 – Detroit Lions
- Position: Linebacker
- Roster status: Practice squad

Personal information
- Born: September 29, 2000 (age 26); Lawrenceville, Georgia, U.S.
- Listed height: 6 ft 0 in (1.83 m)
- Listed weight: 230 lb (104 kg)

Career information
- High school: Grayson (Loganville, Georgia)
- College: Auburn (2019–2022)
- NFL draft: 2023: 5th round, 168th overall pick

Career history
- Arizona Cardinals (2023–2025); Tennessee Titans (2026); Detroit Lions (2026–present)

Career NFL statistics as of 2025
- Total tackles: 66
- Forced fumbles: 1
- Pass deflections: 5
- Stats at Pro Football Reference

Owen Pappoe (born September 29, 2000) is an American professional football linebacker for the Detroit Lions of the National Football League (NFL). He played college football for the Auburn Tigers and was selected by the Arizona Cardinals in the fifth round of the 2023 NFL draft.

== Early life ==
Pappoe attended Grayson High School in Loganville, Georgia. As a senior, he had 121 tackles. He played in the 2019 Under Armour All-America Game. A five-star recruit, Pappoe committed to Auburn University to play college football. He is of Liberian descent.

== College career ==
Pappoe entered his true freshman season at Auburn in 2019 as a starter. He started all 13 games, recording 49 tackles and two sacks. He returned to Auburn as a starter his sophomore year in 2020 and recorded 93 tackles and 4 sacks. Due to injuries, Pappoe only appeared in 5 games for Auburn in 2021.

== Professional career ==
Pre-draft measurables
| Height | Weight | Arm length | Hand span | Wingspan | 40-yard dash | 10-yard split | 20-yard split | Vertical jump | Broad jump | Bench press |
|---|---|---|---|---|---|---|---|---|---|---|
| 6 ft 0 1/4 in (1.84 m) | 225 lb (102 kg) | 31 3/4 in (0.81 m) | 9 1/8 in (0.23 m) | 6 ft 6 in (1.98 m) | 4.39 s | 1.52 s | 2.52 s | 35.5 in (0.90 m) | 10 ft 6 in (3.20 m) | 29 reps |
All values from NFL Combine

=== Arizona Cardinals ===
Pappoe was selected by the Arizona Cardinals in the fifth round, 168 overall, of the 2023 NFL draft.

On August 30, 2026, Pappoe was waived by the Cardinals as a part of roster cuts before the start of the regular season.

=== Tennessee Titans ===
On August 31, 2026, Pappoe was claimed off of waivers by the Tennessee Titans. He was waived on September 26 and re-signed to the practice squad three days later. On October 6, he was released.

=== Detroit Lions ===
On November 4, 2026, Pappoe was signed to the Detroit Lions practice squad.

== NFL career statistics ==
Legend
| **Bold** | Career high |

=== Regular season ===
| Year | Team | Games | | Tackles | | | | | Interceptions | | | | | | Fumbles | | | | |
| Year | Team | GP | GS | Cmb | Solo | Ast | Sck | TFL | Int | Yds | Avg | Lng | TD | PD | FF | Fum | FR | Yds | TD |
|---|---|---|---|---|---|---|---|---|---|---|---|---|---|---|---|---|---|---|---|
| 2023 | ARI | 16 | 1 | 11 | 5 | 6 | 0.0 | 0 | 0 | 0 | 0.0 | 0 | 0 | 1 | 0 | 0 | 0 | 0 | 0 |
| 2024 | ARI | 16 | 1 | **28** | **18** | 10 | 0.0 | 0 | 0 | 0 | 0.0 | 0 | 0 | **2** | **1** | 0 | 0 | 0 | 0 |
| 2025 | ARI | 17 | 0 | 27 | 12 | **15** | 0.0 | 0 | 0 | 0 | 0.0 | 0 | 0 | **2** | 0 | 0 | 0 | 0 | 0 |
| Career | | 49 | 2 | 66 | 35 | 31 | 0.0 | 0 | 0 | 0 | 0.0 | 0 | 0 | 5 | 1 | 0 | 0 | 0 | 0 |
