= Jonathan Gannon =

American football coach (born 1983)

Green Bay Packers
- Title: Defensive coordinator

Personal information
- Born: January 4, 1983 (age 43); Cleveland, Ohio, U.S.

Career information
- Position: Cornerback
- High school: Saint Ignatius (Cleveland)
- College: Louisville (2001–2002)

Career history

Coaching
- Louisville (2003–2005) Student assistant; Louisville (2006) Graduate assistant; Atlanta Falcons (2007) Defensive quality control coach; Tennessee Titans (2012–2013) Defensive quality control coach; Minnesota Vikings (2014–2017) Assistant defensive backs coach; Indianapolis Colts (2018–2020) Defensive backs coach; Philadelphia Eagles (2021–2022) Defensive coordinator; Arizona Cardinals (2023–2025) Head coach; Green Bay Packers (2026–present) Defensive coordinator

Operations
- St. Louis Rams (2009) College scout; St. Louis Rams (2010–2011) Pro scout

Head coaching record
- Regular season: 15–36 (.294)
- Coaching profile at Pro Football Reference

Jonathan James Gannon (born January 4, 1983) is an American professional football coach who is the defensive coordinator for the Green Bay Packers of the National Football League (NFL). He previously served as the head coach of the Arizona Cardinals from 2023 to 2025.

Gannon played college football at Louisville. He came to prominence as the defensive coordinator of the Philadelphia Eagles, helping the team reach Super Bowl LVII. He previously served as an assistant coach for the Atlanta Falcons, Tennessee Titans, Minnesota Vikings, and Indianapolis Colts.

== Early life ==
A native of Cleveland, Ohio, Gannon attended Saint Ignatius High School where he was a successful three-sport athlete, winning a state championship in basketball as a point guard, a district champion as a hurdler in track, and a state championship as a standout wide receiver and cornerback.

Gannon went on to play for the Louisville Cardinals until a hip injury forced him to quit playing. He remained with the program as a volunteer assistant during the 2003–2005 seasons. He was a graduate assistant the next season for Louisville.

== Coaching career ==
=== Atlanta Falcons ===
In 2007, Gannon was hired by the Atlanta Falcons as a defensive quality control coach, following Bobby Petrino to the National Football League.

=== St. Louis Rams ===
In 2009, Gannon was hired by the St. Louis Rams as a college scout. He was promoted to a pro scout in 2010 and left the Rams in 2011.

=== Tennessee Titans ===
In 2012, Gannon returned to coaching and was hired by the Tennessee Titans as a defensive quality control coach, a position he served in until 2013.

=== Minnesota Vikings ===
In 2014, Gannon was hired by the Minnesota Vikings as their assistant defensive backs and defensive quality control coach. He served in this role for four seasons before leaving the Vikings following the 2017 season.

=== Indianapolis Colts ===
In 2018, Gannon was hired by the Indianapolis Colts as their defensive backs and cornerbacks coach under head coach Frank Reich and stayed there until 2020.

=== Philadelphia Eagles ===
In 2021, Gannon was hired by the Philadelphia Eagles as their defensive coordinator under head coach Nick Sirianni.

=== Arizona Cardinals ===
Two days after losing Super Bowl LVII, Gannon was hired by the Arizona Cardinals as their head coach on February 14, 2023.

==== Tampering scandal ====
On April 27, 2023, it was revealed that Gannon had interviewed with the Cardinals the week after the Eagles won the NFC Championship Game, which is a period of impermissible contact. According to Marcus Hayes of The Philadelphia Inquirer, the Eagles front office was furious at Gannon believing that he was distracted prior to the Super Bowl. As a result of the tampering, the Eagles and Cardinals announced they had swapped third round picks in the 2023 NFL draft and the Cardinals received the Eagles' 2024 fifth round pick.

==== 2023 season ====
Gannon won his first preseason game 18–17 against the Denver Broncos on August 11, 2023. However, the Cardinals lost in Gannon's regular-season debut against the Washington Commanders by a score of 20–16 on September 10, 2023. On September 24, 2023, Gannon won his first regular season game as an NFL head coach against the Dallas Cowboys by a score of 28–16. Despite starting 1–8, the return of quarterback Kyler Murray in Week 10 saw the team finish the season on a 3–5 run, including a notable upset over Gannon's previous team the Philadelphia Eagles in Week 17 which denied them a chance at the NFC's top seed in the playoffs. Under Gannon, the Cardinals finished 4–13 in 2023.

==== 2024 season ====
On September 8, 2024, the Cardinals lost against the Buffalo Bills by a score 28–34 in the week 1 season opener. On September 15, 2024, Gannon and the Cardinals earned their first win of the season in week 2 against the Los Angeles Rams by a score of 41–10. Since week 4, Gannon led the Cardinals to four consecutive victories for the first time under his leadership and three victories on game-winning field goals after a deficit of 13 points or less: 24–23 against the San Francisco 49ers, 17–15 against the Los Angeles Chargers, and 28–27 against the Miami Dolphins. The Cardinals defeated the Chicago Bears and the New York Jets at home to improve to 6–4 and 1st in the NFC West. Following the bye week, the Cardinals suffered a 3-game losing streak: 6–16 visiting the Seattle Seahawks, 22–23 against the Minnesota Vikings, and 30–18 hosting the Seahawks. These losses dropped the Cardinals to 6–7 and lowered their NFC West rank from 1st to 3rd. After a 30–17 win over the New England Patriots, the Cardinals were eliminated from playoff contention with a 30–36 loss against the Carolina Panthers in overtime. The Cardinals lost their second game against the Rams with a score of 9–13. In the season finale, the Cardinals dominated the 49ers by a score of 24–47 to improve to a record of 8–9, which was the first time the Cardinals swept the 49ers since the 2021 season.

==== 2025 season ====
On October 5, 2025, the Cardinals lost to the Tennessee Titans 21–22 after blowing a 21–3 lead. During the game, Gannon was seen yelling at running back Emari Demercado and seemingly throwing a punch at Demercado's stomach for fumbling in the endzone that eventually led to the Titans' comeback. Gannon later stated that he apologized to Demercado and the rest of the team privately for the altercation, while the Cardinals fined him $100,000. After finishing last in the division with a 3–14 record, the Cardinals fired Gannon on January 5, 2026.

=== Green Bay Packers ===
==== 2026 season ====
On February 2, 2026, Gannon was hired by the Green Bay Packers as their defensive coordinator under head coach Matt LaFleur. Gannon replaced Jeff Hafley, who left to become the head coach of the Miami Dolphins.

== Head coaching record ==
Team	Year	Regular season					Postseason			
Team	Year	Won	Lost	Ties	Win %	Finish	Won	Lost	Win %	Result
ARI	2023	4	13	0	.235	4th in NFC West	—	—	—	—
ARI	2024	8	9	0	.471	3rd in NFC West	—	—	—	—
ARI	2025	3	14	0	.176	4th in NFC West	—	—	—	—
Total		15	36	0	.294		0	0	.000	

== Personal life ==
Gannon is married and has three children.
