= Dorothy Bainton =

American pathologist

Dorothy Ford Bainton is a Professor Emeritus in the department of pathology, and was the first woman to chair a department at the University of California San Francisco (UCSF). She retired from UCSF in 2004. Her research focused on the development of leukemia.

== Early life and education ==
Bainton was born in Magnolia, Mississippi. She graduated from Millsaps College with a bachelor's degree in 1955. She was one of four women in her class of 128 students in medical school at Tulane University School of Medicine, where she received her MD in 1958. She completed residency at the University of Rochester's Strong Memorial Hospital and the University of Washington School of Medicine.

== Career ==
Bainton joined the University of California San Francisco as a postdoctoral fellow in the department of pathology in 1963. In 1981, she was elevated to the position of full professor, and in 1987, she became the first woman to chair a department at the University of California San Francisco when she was appointed chair of the department of pathology. She served in that role until 1994, when she was appointed vice chancellor for academic affairs. From 1993 to 1994, she chaired the UCSF Academic Senate.

Her research focused on differentiation of cells in bone marrow and the development of blood cancers.

=== Awards ===
- 1990 Elected member of the Institute of Medicine
- 1996 Elected to the American Academy of Arts and Sciences
- 1999 American Society for Investigative Pathology Gold-Headed Cane award
- 2003 UCSF Chancellor's Award for the Advancement of Women
- 2009 UCSF Medal
- Elected fellow of the American Association for the Advancement of Science
- National Institutes of Health MERIT Award
