= South Pike School District =

School district in Mississippi

The South Pike School District is a public school district based in Magnolia, Mississippi, United States.

In addition to Magnolia, the district also serves the town of Osyka, the community of Fernwood, and a small portion of the McComb city limits, as well as rural areas in southern Pike County.

== Schools ==
Secondary schools

- South Pike High School (Magnolia) (Grades 9-12) (Notable alumnus: Kevin Magee (1959–2003), basketball player)
- South Pike Junior High School (Magnolia) (Grades 7-8)

Elementary schools

- Grades 4-6
  - Magnolia Elementary School (Magnolia)
- Grades K-6
  - Osyka Elementary School (Osyka)
- Grades K-3
  - Eva Gordon Elementary School (Magnolia)

=== Other Campuses ===
- South Pike Vocational Center (Magnolia)
- South Pike Alternative School (Magnolia)
- South Pike Parent Center (Magnolia)

== Demographics ==
=== 2006-07 school year ===
There were a total of 1,998 students enrolled in the South Pike School District during the 2006–2007 school year. The gender makeup of the district was 49% female and 51% male. The racial makeup of the district was 82.58% African American, 17.22% White, 0.15% Hispanic, and 0.05% Asian. 99.9% of the district's students were eligible to receive free lunch.

=== Previous school years ===
School Year	Enrollment	Gender Makeup		Racial Makeup				
School Year	Enrollment	Female	Male	Asian	African American	Hispanic	Native American	White
2005-06	2,052	48%	52%	0.05%	82.70%	0.10%	–	17.15%
2004-05	2,029	48%	52%	0.05%	80.29%	0.05%	–	19.62%
2003-04	2,081	48%	52%	–	80.20%	–	–	19.80%
2002-03	2,244	48%	52%	0.18%	76.16%	–	–	23.66%

== Accountability statistics ==
	2006-07	2005-06	2004-05	2003-04	2002-03
District Accreditation Status	Accredited	Accredited	Accredited	Accredited	Accredited
School Performance Classifications
Level 5 (Superior Performing) Schools	0	1	0	0	0
Level 4 (Exemplary) Schools	1	0	1	1	1
Level 3 (Successful) Schools	4	4	3	3	3
Level 2 (Under Performing) Schools	0	0	1	1	1
Level 1 (Low Performing) Schools	0	0	0	0	0
Not Assigned	0	0	0	0	0

== Notable alumni ==
- Laphonza Butler – United States Senator from California
- Carl Hampton – Civil Rights activist
- Davion Taylor – NFL player

== See also ==
List of school districts in Mississippi
