= Sherman Line Rosenwald School =

School in Magnolia, Mississippi, US (1928–1959)

- U.S. National Register of Historic Places
- Mississippi Landmark
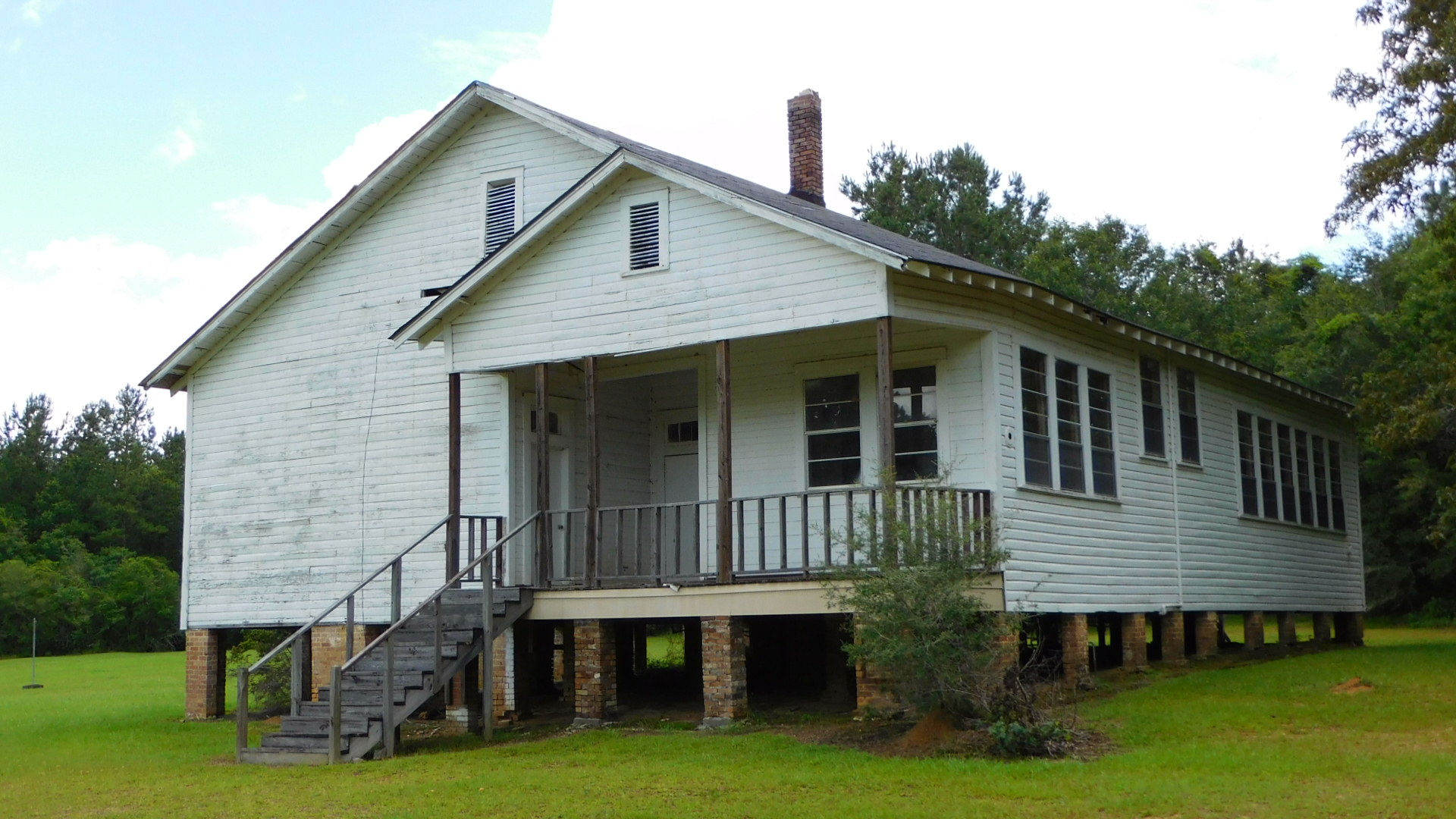

- Location within Mississippi
- Location: 3021 Sherman Church Rd., Magnolia, Mississippi, U.S.
- Coordinates: 31°08′02″N 90°32′56″W
- Area: less than one acre
- NRHP reference No.: 100000535
- USMS No.: 0422/460

Significant dates
- Added to NRHP: January 12, 2017
- Designated USMS: September 15, 2016

The Sherman Line Rosenwald School, also documented as Sherman–Line School, is a former Rosenwald school established in 1928 African American students in Amite County, Mississippi. It closed in 1959. The building is listed as a Mississippi Landmark in 2016; was placed on the National Register of Historic Places in 2017; and has a historical marker erected 2019 by Mississippi Department of Archives and History.

== History ==
The Sherman Line Rosenwald School is one of only about a dozen surviving Rosenwald schools in Mississippi.

The school was behind the Sherman Missionary Baptist Church. It is located in a rural setting and although the school is technically located in Amite County, the nearest population center is Magnolia in Pike County. It served Black students in both Amite and Pike Counties, for grades 1-8. It used the floor plan for a three teacher community school. In the 1940s and 1950s roughly 137 students attended the school. It had two outhouses for rest room facilities.

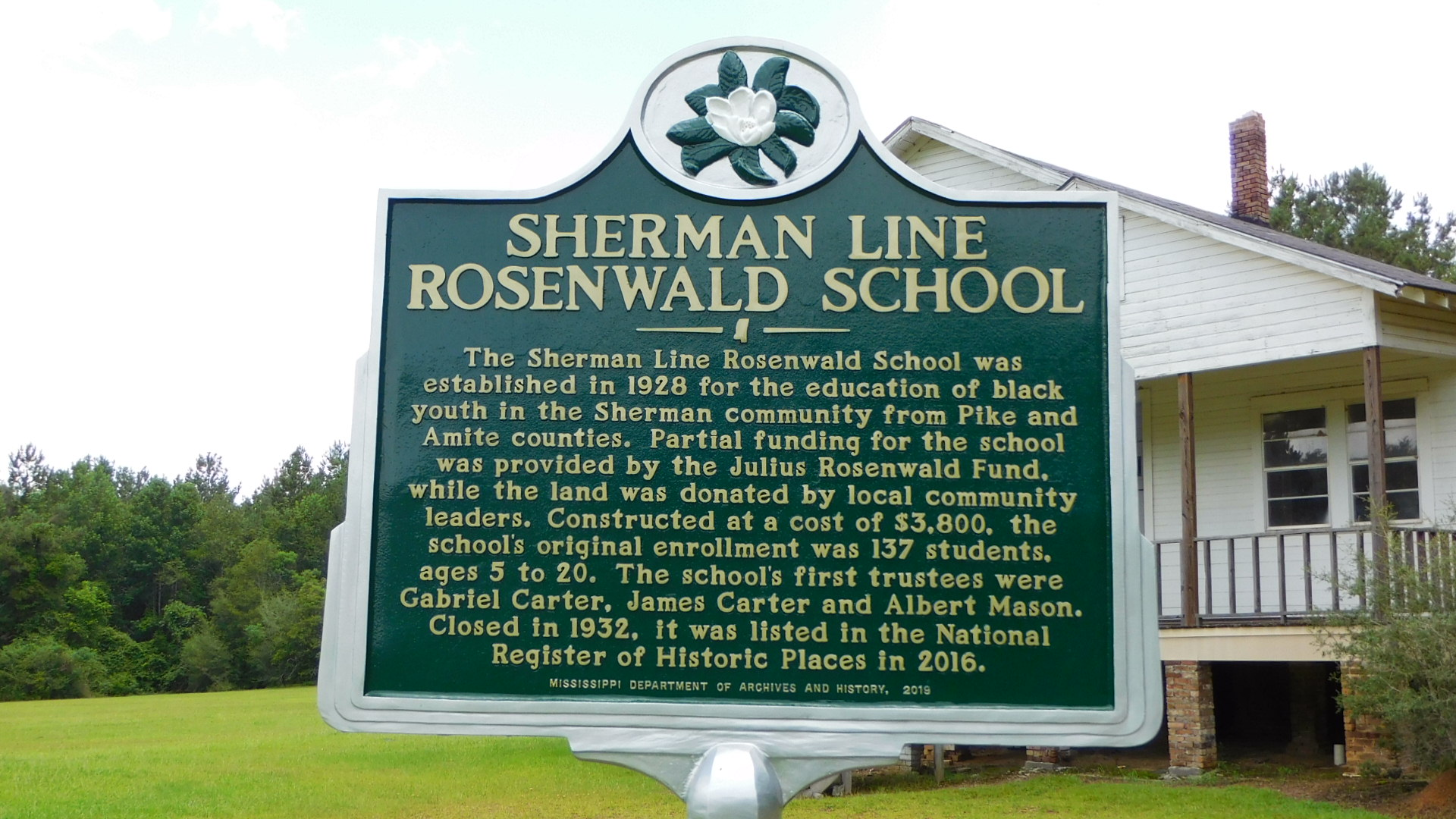
Commemorative marker explaining the history of the Sherman Line Rosenwald School

Sherman Line Rosenwald School closed in 1959, during integration. The building sat vacant for a few years, until it was renovated in the 1970s and opened as a Head Start Center.

The Sherman Line Development Corp. is a nonprofit established to raise funding to restore the building.

== See also ==
- List of Rosenwald schools
- National Register of Historic Places listings in Amite County, Mississippi
