= Emari Demercado =

American football player (born 1999)

- Demercado with the Houston Texans in 2026

No. 21 – Houston Texans
- Positions: Running back, kickoff returner
- Roster status: Active

Personal information
- Born: January 20, 1999 (age 27); Inglewood, California, U.S.
- Listed height: 5 ft 9 in (1.75 m)
- Listed weight: 215 lb (98 kg)

Career information
- High school: Downey (Downey, California)
- College: Saddleback (2017); TCU (2018–2022)
- NFL draft: 2023: undrafted

Career history
- Arizona Cardinals (2023–2025); Kansas City Chiefs (2026)*; Dallas Cowboys (2026); Houston Texans (2026–present)
- * Offseason or practice squad member only

Career NFL statistics as of Week 3, 2026
- Rushing yards: 834
- Rushing average: 6.4
- Rushing touchdowns: 3
- Receptions: 50
- Receiving yards: 324
- Receiving touchdowns: 1
- Return yards: 150
- Stats at Pro Football Reference

Emari Demercado (born January 20, 1999) is an American professional running back and kickoff returner for the Houston Texans of the National Football League (NFL). He played college football for the Saddleback Guachos and TCU Horned Frogs and was signed as an undrafted free agent by the Arizona Cardinals after the 2023 NFL draft.

== Early life ==
Demercado grew up in Inglewood, California, and attended Century Community Charter School in the heart of Inglewood. He also attended Downey High School. He committed to play college football at Saddleback College, a junior college in Mission Viejo, California. He is of Jamaican descent.

== College career ==
Demercado played one year at Saddleback under head coach Mark McElroy, rushing for 1,026 yards and 15 touchdowns and bringing in 54 receptions for 443 yards and two touchdowns. On May 6, 2018, he committed to Texas Christian University (TCU).

Demercado played for five years at TCU and racked up 1,615 rushing yards and 10 rushing touchdowns on 4.8 yards per carry and 40 receptions for 277 yards and a touchdown. His best season came in 2022 where he recorded 121 carries for 681 yards and six touchdowns and had 13 catches for 65 yards and a touchdown. In TCU's first playoff game, Demercado rushed for a career-high 150 yards and a touchdown. He also rushed for 59 yards in the National Championship Game.

After the season Demercado declared for the 2023 NFL draft.

== Professional career ==
Pre-draft measurables
Height	Weight	Arm length	Hand span	Wingspan	40-yard dash	10-yard split	20-yard split	20-yard shuttle	Three-cone drill	Vertical jump	Broad jump	Bench press
5 ft 9 3/8 in (1.76 m)	213 lb (97 kg)	32 5/8 in (0.83 m)	9 1/2 in (0.24 m)	6 ft 2 1/2 in (1.89 m)	4.44 s	1.58 s	2.56 s	4.15 s	7.00 s	32.0 in (0.81 m)	9 ft 11 in (3.02 m)	19 reps
All values from Pro Day

=== Arizona Cardinals ===
After not being selected in the 2023 NFL draft, Demercado signed with the Arizona Cardinals as an undrafted free agent. On August 29, 2023, the Cardinals announced that he had made the initial 53-man roster. In Week 5 against the Cincinnati Bengals, Demercado had his first professional rushing touchdown in the 34–20 loss. He appeared in 14 games and made two starts in the 2023 season, finishing with 58 carries for 284 rushing yards and two rushing touchdowns to go with 21 receptions for 119 receiving yards.

Demercado was the Cardinals' third-string running back in 2024 behind James Conner and Trey Benson. He recorded 24 carries for 223 yards, including a 53-yard touchdown against the Chicago Bears. The score was the longest touchdown run by a Cardinal since Kenyan Drake's 69-yard score in 2020.

He began the 2025 season backing up Conner and Benson until they suffered injuries, and remained the third-string back behind Michael Carter and Zonovan Knight. In Week 5 against the Tennessee Titans, Demercado was about to score a 72-yard touchdown run when he let go of the ball before crossing the goal line; the loose ball bounced through the end zone for a touchback. The Cardinals' 21–6 lead at the time of his mistake subsequently evaporated and they lost 22–21. On the sideline, Cardinals head coach Jonathan Gannon lectured Demercado before seemingly hitting him in the arm. Gannon later apologized to Demercado and was fined $100,000 by the team.

=== Kansas City Chiefs ===
On March 12, 2026, Demercado signed a one-year, $1.25 million contract with the Kansas City Chiefs. On August 30, he was waived by the Chiefs as a part of final roster cuts.

=== Dallas Cowboys ===
On August 31, 2026, Demercado was claimed off waivers by the Dallas Cowboys. On October 8, Demarcado was waived, but re-signed five days later. On October 27, Demercado was waived.

=== Houston Texans ===
On October 28, 2026, Demercado was claimed off waivers by the Houston Texans.

== NFL career statistics ==
Legend
**Bold**	Career high

Year	Team	Games		Rushing					Receiving					Kick returns					Fumbles	
Year	Team	GP	GS	Att	Yds	Avg	Lng	TD	Rec	Yds	Avg	Lng	TD	Ret	Yds	Avg	Lng	TD	Fum	Lost
2023	ARI	**14**	**2**	**58**	284	4.9	49	**2**	**21**	**119**	5.7	22	0	—	—	—	—	—	0	0
2024	ARI	13	0	24	223	**9.3**	53	1	16	104	6.5	24	0	**3**	64	21.3	26	0	0	0
2025	ARI	13	0	44	**312**	7.1	**71**	0	13	101	**7.8**	**34**	**1**	**3**	**86**	**28.7**	**36**	0	**1**	**1**
Career		40	2	126	819	6.5	71	3	50	324	6.5	34	1	6	150	25.0	36	0	1	1
