= Jimmy Cockerham =

American baseball player

- Catcher
- Born: August 12, 1910; Magnolia, Mississippi
- Died: December 16, 1963 (aged 53); Indianapolis, Indiana
- Batted: Right Threw: Right

Negro league baseball debut
- 1937, for the Indianapolis Athletics

Last appearance
- 1937, for the Indianapolis Athletics

Teams
- Indianapolis Athletics (1937)

James Amos Cockerham (August 12, 1910 – December 16, 1963) was an American Negro league catcher in the 1930s.

A native of Magnolia, Mississippi, Cockerham played for the Indianapolis Athletics in 1937. In three recorded games, he posted one hit in five plate appearances. Cockerham died in Indianapolis, Indiana in 1963 at age 53.
