= Davion Taylor =

American gridiron football player (born 1998)

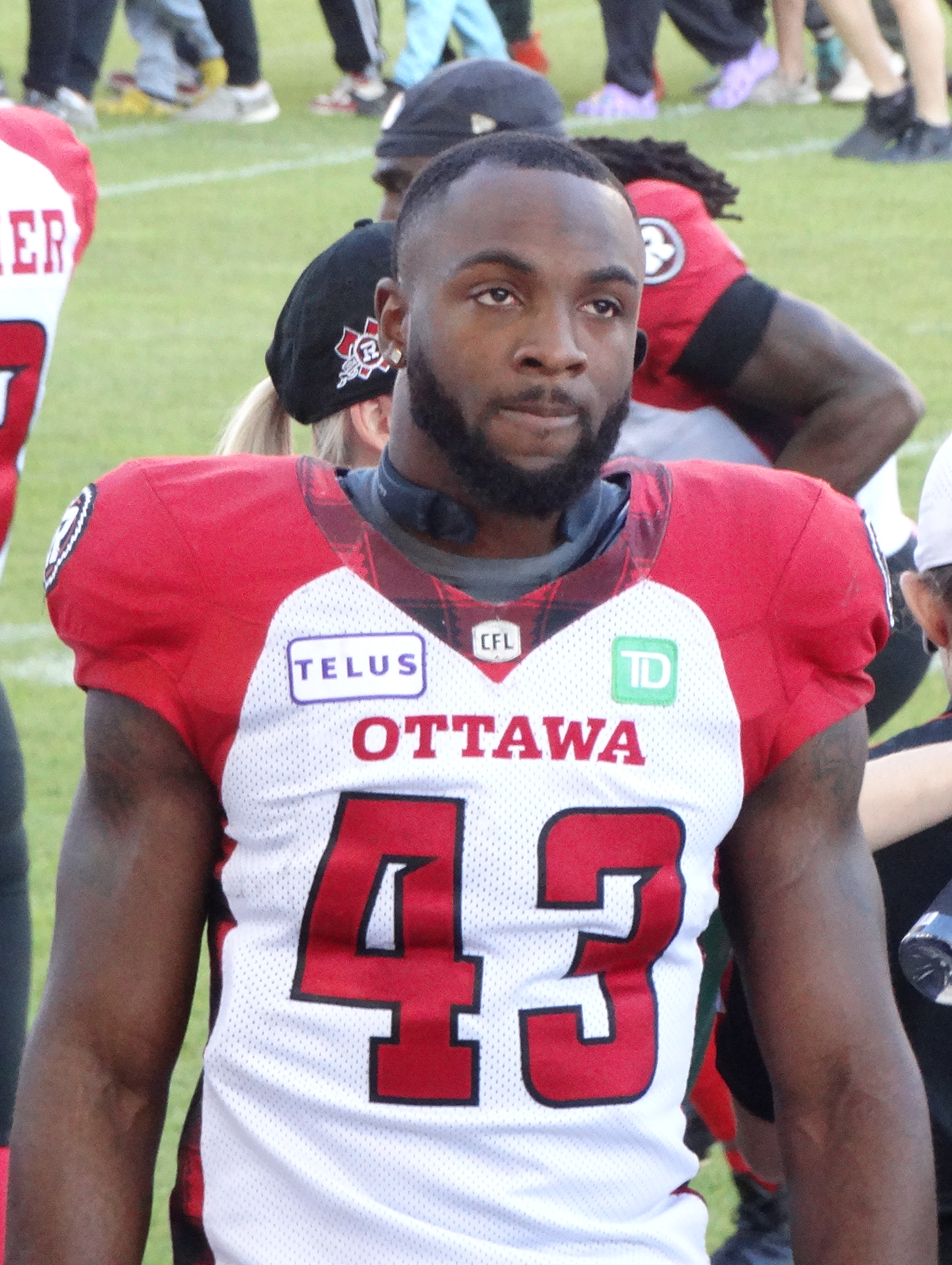
- Taylor with the Ottawa Redblacks in 2024

Profile
- Position: Linebacker

Personal information
- Born: August 5, 1998 (age 28); McComb, Mississippi, U.S.
- Listed height: 6 ft 1 in (1.85 m)
- Listed weight: 230 lb (104 kg)

Career information
- High school: South Pike (Magnolia, Mississippi)
- College: Coahoma (2016–2017); Colorado (2018–2019)
- NFL draft: 2020: 3rd round, 103rd overall pick

Career history
- Philadelphia Eagles (2020–2022); Chicago Bears (2023)*; Arizona Cardinals (2023)*; Ottawa Redblacks (2024–2025)
- * Offseason or practice squad member only

Career NFL statistics
- Total tackles: 51
- Forced fumbles: 2
- Stats at Pro Football Reference
- Stats at CFL.ca

Davion Taylor (born August 5, 1998) American professional football linebacker. He most recently played for the Ottawa Redblacks of the Canadian Football League (CFL). He played college football for the Colorado Buffaloes and was selected by the Philadelphia Eagles in the third round of the 2020 NFL draft.

== Early life ==
Taylor was raised in Magnolia, Mississippi, by his Seventh-day Adventist mother Stephanie Taylor. Taylor attended South Pike High School but did not play high school football due to the religious beliefs of his church.

== College career ==
Taylor attended Coahoma Community College before attending the University of Colorado Boulder. After turning 18 he was given permission by his mother to join the football team. In 2018, Taylor transferred to Colorado. In 2018, he started 10 of 12 games, recording 57 tackles, one sack and one touchdown. As a senior in 2019, he started all 12 games, recording 72 tackles and one sack.

== Professional career ==
Pre-draft measurables
Height	Weight	Arm length	Hand span	40-yard dash	10-yard split	20-yard split	20-yard shuttle	Three-cone drill	Vertical jump	Broad jump	Bench press
6 ft 0 1/2 in (1.84 m)	228 lb (103 kg)	32 1/8 in (0.82 m)	9 5/8 in (0.24 m)	4.39 s	1.55 s	2.57 s	4.26 s	6.96 s	36.0 in (0.91 m)	10 ft 7 in (3.23 m)	21 reps
All values from NFL Combine/Pro Day

=== Philadelphia Eagles ===
Taylor was drafted by the Eagles in the third round with the 103rd overall pick of the 2020 NFL draft. He was placed on injured reserve on December 9, 2020. He was designated to return from injured reserve on December 30, and began practicing with the team again, but the team did not activate him before the end of the season.

Taylor took on a starting role with the team in Week 6 of the 2021 season, but was placed on injured reserve on November 24 due to a knee injury.

Taylor was released on August 31, 2022, and re-signed to the practice squad. On February 15, 2023, Taylor signed a reserve/future contract with the Eagles. On August 6, the Eagles released Taylor.

=== Chicago Bears ===
On August 17, 2023, Taylor signed with the Chicago Bears. He was waived on August 29, 2023.

=== Arizona Cardinals ===
On September 26, 2023, Taylor was signed to the Arizona Cardinals practice squad. He was released on October 10. On December 20, Taylor was re-signed to the Cardinals practice squad. He was not signed to a reserve/future contract after the season, and thus became a free agent upon the expiration of his practice squad contract.

=== Ottawa Redblacks ===
Taylor signed with the Ottawa Redblacks on March 18, 2024. He played for the Redblacks for two seasons and became a free agent upon the expiry of his contract on February 10, 2026.

== NFL career statistics ==
Year	Team	Games		Tackles				Fumbles				Interceptions					
Year	Team	G	GS	Comb	Total	Ast	Sack	FF	FR	Yds	TD	Int	Yds	Avg	Lng	TD	PD
2020	PHI	12	1	10	7	3	0.0	0	0	0	0	0	0	0	0	0	0
2021	PHI	9	6	41	24	17	0.0	2	0	0	0	0	0	0	0	0	0
Career		21	7	51	31	20	0.0	2	0	0	0	0	0	0.0	0	0	0

== Personal life ==
Taylor is a member of the Seventh-day Adventist Church.
