= Joseph Elias Norwood =

Joseph Elias Norwood (born May 5, 1873) was a mayor and state legislator in Mississippi. He lived in Magnolia, Mississippi.

He was born on the Richland Plantation in East Feliciana Parish, Louisiana. He studied at Southern University in Greensboro, Alabama and received a law degree from Vanderbilt University. He owned and edited the Magnolia Gazette.
