= Josh Woods (American football) =

American football player (born 1996)

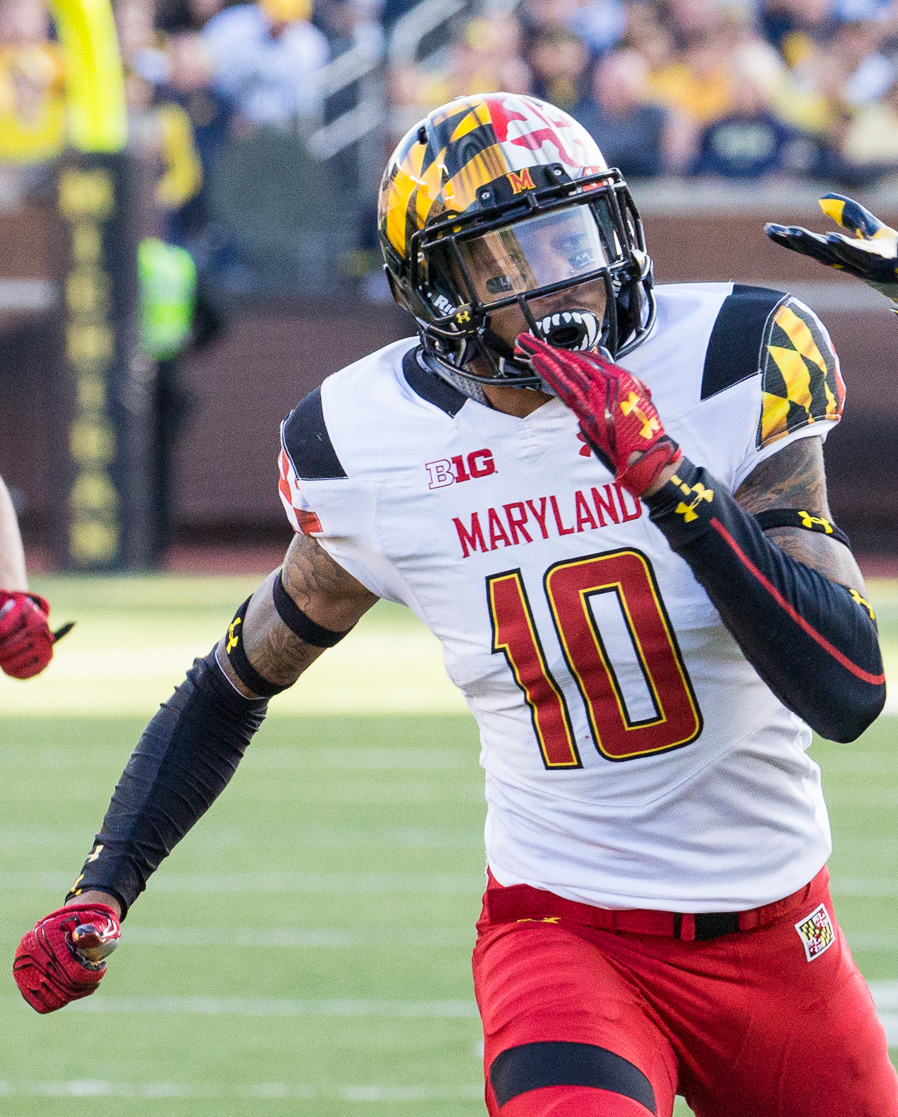
- Woods with the Maryland Terrapins in 2016

No. 42 – Atlanta Falcons
- Position: Linebacker
- Roster status: Active

Personal information
- Born: July 1, 1996 (age 30); Baltimore, Maryland, U.S.
- Listed height: 6 ft 1 in (1.85 m)
- Listed weight: 235 lb (107 kg)

Career information
- High school: McDonogh School (Owings Mills, Maryland)
- College: Maryland (2014–2017)
- NFL draft: 2018: undrafted

Career history
- Chicago Bears (2018–2021); Detroit Lions (2021–2022); Arizona Cardinals (2023); Atlanta Falcons (2024–present)

Career NFL statistics as of 2025
- Total tackles: 137
- Sacks: 0.5
- Forced fumbles: 1
- Fumble recoveries: 1
- Stats at Pro Football Reference

Josh Woods (born July 1, 1996) is an American professional football linebacker for the Atlanta Falcons of the National Football League (NFL). He played college football for the Maryland Terrapins.

== Early life ==
Woods was born and grew up in Baltimore, Maryland. He attended KIPP Baltimore (KIPP Ujima Village Academy) through eighth grade, and high school at the McDonogh School. He played both cornerback and wide receiver for the Eagles and was named first-team All-Metro by the Baltimore Sun and first-team All-State as a senior after making 35 tackles with four interceptions on defense catching 35 passes for 800 yards and 10 touchdowns on offense as McDonogh went 11-0 and won its first MIAA state championship. All 4 years in high school, Josh was an academic all american. He maintained a grade point average of 4.267 upon graduating high school. Rated a three-star recruit, Woods committed to play college football at the University of Maryland over offers from Virginia and Delaware.

== College career ==
Woods played four seasons for the Maryland Terrapins as a defensive back. He was used primarily on special teams during his freshman and sophomore seasons, playing in 14 total games and making two tackles. Woods became a key member of the Terrapins secondary as a junior, playing in ten games with five starts while making 41 tackles (one for loss) and breaking up two passes. As a senior, Woods made 62 tackles (4.5 for loss) with four passes broken up and two interceptions despite missing two games due to injury.

In his college career, Woods appeared in 34 games with 14 starts at safety, recording 107 total tackles, two interceptions, eight pass breakups, and one forced fumble.

== Professional career ==
Pre-draft measurables
Height	Weight	Arm length	Hand span	Wingspan	40-yard dash	10-yard split	20-yard split	20-yard shuttle	Three-cone drill	Vertical jump	Broad jump	Bench press
6 ft 1 7/8 in (1.88 m)	211 lb (96 kg)	33 in (0.84 m)	8 1/8 in (0.21 m)	6 ft 7 3/4 in (2.03 m)	4.66 s	1.65 s	2.75 s	4.53 s	7.10 s	31.5 in (0.80 m)	10 ft 1 in (3.07 m)	7 reps
All values from Pro Day

=== Chicago Bears ===
Woods was signed by the Chicago Bears on June 7, 2018, after participating in a veteran mini-camp on a tryout basis. He was cut by the team at the end of training camp but was re-signed to the team's practice squad on September 2, 2018. He spent the entire 2018 season on the practice squad as he continued to transition to linebacker, adding 30 pounds in the process. After a strong showing in preseason, Woods made the Bears 53-man roster going into the 2019 season.

Woods made his NFL debut on September 29, 2019, against the Minnesota Vikings, playing 15 snaps on special teams. Woods played in nine games in 2019 and made five total tackles.

Woods signed a contract extension with the Bears on March 3, 2021. He was waived on September 6, 2021, and re-signed to the practice squad.

=== Detroit Lions ===
On September 23, 2021, Woods was signed by the Detroit Lions off the Bears practice squad. He was placed on injured reserve on December 28.

On February 22, 2022, Woods signed a one-year contract extension with the Lions.

=== Arizona Cardinals ===
On March 23, 2023, Woods signed with the Arizona Cardinals. On December 20, he was placed on injured reserve.

=== Atlanta Falcons ===
On September 17, 2024, Woods was signed to the Atlanta Falcons' practice squad. He was promoted to the active roster on December 28.

On July 30, 2026, Woods re-signed with the Falcons. He was released by Atlanta on August 30 as a part of final roster cuts. Woods was re–signed to Atlanta's active roster the following day.
