= Magnolia, Mississippi =

- City
- Location of Magnolia, Mississippi

- Location in the United States
- Coordinates: 31°8′57″N 90°27′41″W
- Country: United States
- State: Mississippi
- County: Pike

Government
  - Mayor: Tammy Witherspoon (D)

Area
  - Total: 6.19 sq mi (16.03 km^{2})
  - Land: 6.14 sq mi (15.91 km^{2})
  - Water: 0.046 sq mi (0.12 km^{2})
- Elevation: 305 ft (93 m)

Population (2020)
  - Total: 1,883
  - Density: 306.6/sq mi (118.36/km^{2})
- Time zone: UTC-6 (Central (CST))
  - Summer (DST): UTC-5 (CDT)
- ZIP code: 39652
- Area code: 601
- FIPS code: 28-44680
- GNIS feature ID: 0673065

Magnolia is a city in Pike County, Mississippi and the county seat. As of the 2020 census, Magnolia had a population of 1,883. Magnolia is within the McComb, Mississippi Micropolitan Statistical Area.

== History ==
Magnolia was founded in 1856 by Ansel H. Prewett, a local civic leader and cotton planter. Knowing that the approaching New Orleans, Jackson, and Great Northern Railroad (now the Illinois Central Railroad) would need a station for water and fuel, Prewett sold a right-of-way to the railroad company – for one dollar, according to legend – and divided a section of his plantation into town lots, which he sold to investors. Prewett, while serving as temporary sheriff of Pike County, was killed by outlaws in the early 1870s escorting a prisoner on the very railroad that made Magnolia a viable community.

Magnolia grew rapidly in the 1860s, and in the late nineteenth century Magnolia served as a popular small-town resort for wealthy New Orleanians, who took trains north from New Orleans to enjoy Magnolia's fresh air and sparkling creeks. At one time early Magnolia boasted an opera house, skating rink, and several hotels that catered largely to these tourists.

In 1860 Magnolia's first newspaper, the Grand Trunk Magnolian, was established by John Waddill. It did not last the war and was succeeded by the establishment of the Magnolia Gazette by J.D. Burke in 1872. The Magnolia Herald was established by Luke W. Conerly in 1875 and he continued as its proprietor and editor until 1878.

== Geography ==
According to the United States Census Bureau, the city has a total area of 3.3 square miles (8.5 km^{2}), of which 3.2 square miles (8.3 km^{2}) is land and 0.1 square miles (0.26 km^{2}) (1.52%) is water.

Within the city limits there is the confluence of the Minnehaha River and the Little Tangipahoa River.

== Demographics ==
Historical population
| Census | Pop. | Note | %± |
|---|---|---|---|
| 1880 | 567 | | — |
| 1890 | 676 | | 19.2% |
| 1900 | 1,088 | | 60.9% |
| 1910 | 1,823 | | 67.6% |
| 1920 | 2,012 | | 10.4% |
| 1930 | 1,660 | | −17.5% |
| 1940 | 2,125 | | 28.0% |
| 1950 | 1,984 | | −6.6% |
| 1960 | 2,083 | | 5.0% |
| 1970 | 1,970 | | −5.4% |
| 1980 | 2,461 | | 24.9% |
| 1990 | 2,245 | | −8.8% |
| 2000 | 2,071 | | −7.8% |
| 2010 | 2,420 | | 16.9% |
| 2020 | 1,883 | | −22.2% |
U.S. Decennial Census

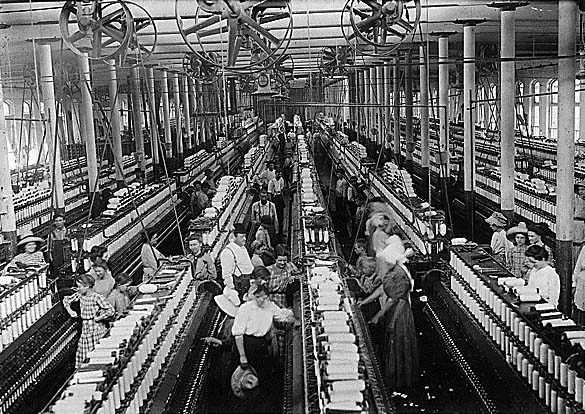
Child laborers scattered throughout the Magnolia Cotton Mills spinning room, 1911. Photo by Lewis Hine.

=== Racial and ethnic composition ===
Magnolia city, Mississippi – Racial and ethnic composition Note: the US Census treats Hispanic/Latino as an ethnic category. This table excludes Latinos from the racial categories and assigns them to a separate category. Hispanics/Latinos may be of any race.
| Race / Ethnicity (NH = Non-Hispanic) | Pop 2000 | Pop 2010 | Pop 2020 | % 2000 | % 2010 | % 2020 |
|---|---|---|---|---|---|---|
| White alone (NH) | 910 | 758 | 508 | 43.94% | 31.32% | 26.98% |
| Black or African American alone (NH) | 1,108 | 1,606 | 1,276 | 53.50% | 66.36% | 67.76% |
| Native American or Alaska Native alone (NH) | 9 | 12 | 2 | 0.43% | 0.50% | 0.11% |
| Asian alone (NH) | 7 | 6 | 5 | 0.34% | 0.25% | 0.27% |
| Native Hawaiian or Pacific Islander alone (NH) | 0 | 0 | 0 | 0.00% | 0.00% | 0.00% |
| Other race alone (NH) | 0 | 0 | 8 | 0.00% | 0.00% | 0.42% |
| Mixed race or Multiracial (NH) | 13 | 10 | 60 | 0.63% | 0.41% | 3.19% |
| Hispanic or Latino (any race) | 24 | 28 | 24 | 1.16% | 1.16% | 1.27% |
| Total | 2,071 | 2,420 | 1,883 | 100.00% | 100.00% | 100.00% |

=== 2020 census ===
As of the 2020 census, Magnolia had a population of 1,883. The median age was 40.8 years. 22.0% of residents were under the age of 18 and 19.3% of residents were 65 years of age or older. For every 100 females there were 99.0 males, and for every 100 females age 18 and over there were 98.6 males age 18 and over.

0.0% of residents lived in urban areas, while 100.0% lived in rural areas.

There were 749 households in Magnolia, of which 31.8% had children under the age of 18 living in them. Of all households, 29.1% were married-couple households, 21.1% were households with a male householder and no spouse or partner present, and 43.5% were households with a female householder and no spouse or partner present. About 34.7% of all households were made up of individuals and 16.9% had someone living alone who was 65 years of age or older. There were 444 families residing in the city.

There were 929 housing units, of which 19.4% were vacant. The homeowner vacancy rate was 3.1% and the rental vacancy rate was 16.1%.

== Transportation ==
=== Highways ===
- Interstate 55
- U.S. Highway 51
- Mississippi Highway 48

=== Air ===
- McComb-Pike County Airport

== Education ==
The City of Magnolia is served by the South Pike School District.

The town has one public library.

Pike County is in the district of Southwest Mississippi Community College.

== Recreation ==
- Percy Quin State Park
- Homochitto National Forest 42 miles away

== Climate ==
The climate in this area is characterized by hot, humid summers and generally mild to cool winters. According to the Köppen Climate Classification system, Magnolia has a humid subtropical climate, abbreviated "Cfa" on climate maps.

== Notable people ==
- Dorothy Bainton, doctor and first woman to chair a department at University of California, San Francisco
- Prentiss Barnes (1925-2006), bass singer in the doo-wop group The Moonglows. Inducted into the Rock and Roll Hall of Fame in 2000.
- Danny Brabham, former American Football League player
- Jeremy Bridges, former National Football League player
- Kelvin Butler, member of the Mississippi Senate from 2004 to 2016 and 2021 to 2024
- Laphonza Butler (born 1979), U.S. senator for California
- Angela Cockerham, member of the Mississippi House of Representatives
- Jimmy Cockerham, Negro league catcher
- Aunjanue Ellis (born 1969), Oscar-nominated actress.
- Sam Holden, former National Football League offensive tackle
- Samuel C. Lancaster, engineer and landscape artist
- Jim Marshall, former Canadian Football League player
- Evander McNair, brigadier general in the Confederate States Army
- Herman Neugass (1915–1991), track & field athlete who boycotted the 1935 Olympic trials
- Joseph Elias Norwood, former member of the Mississippi Senate
- William Parsons, Director of the Kennedy Space Center, oversaw return to flight following the Space Shuttle Columbia disaster in 2003.
- Darryl Pounds, former NFL player
- J. H. Price, former justice of the Supreme Court of Mississippi
- Michael Farris Smith, writer
- Lynne Spears (born 1955), author and mother of Bryan, Britney, and Jamie Lynn Spears.
- Tre' Stallings, former NFL player
- Davion Taylor (born 1998), NFL Linebacker drafted by the Philadelphia Eagles, 3rd round, in 2020.
- T. C. Taylor, former NFL player and head coach of the Jackson State Tigers
- Thad Vann, head football coach for the Southern Miss Golden Eagles from 1949 to 1968 and member of the College Football Hall of Fame
- Sammy Williams, former NFL offensive tackle

== See also ==
- Magnolia Depot
- Sherman Line Rosenwald School
