= 49ers–Cardinals rivalry =

National Football League rivalry

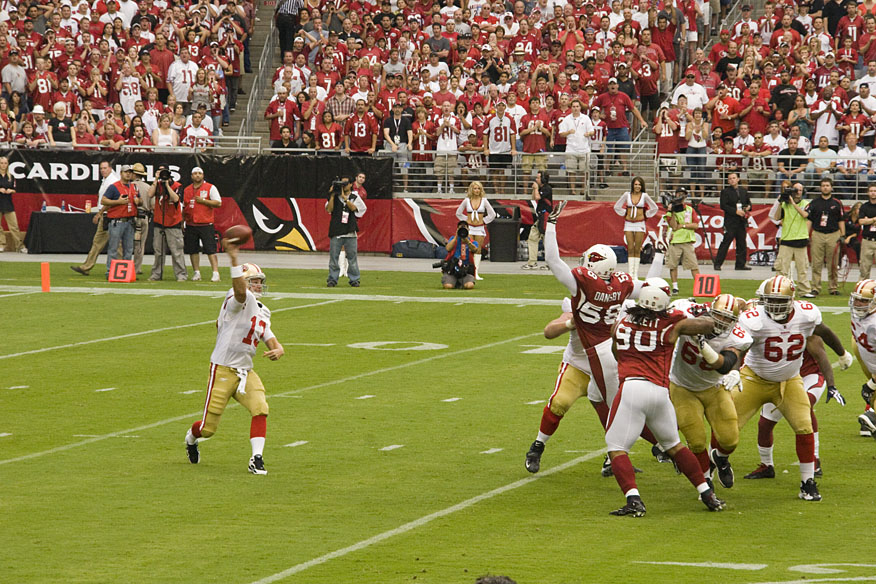
- 49ers and Cardinals face off during the 2009 season.

- San Francisco 49ers Arizona Cardinals
- Location: San Francisco, Phoenix
- First meeting: November 18, 1951; Cardinals 27, 49ers 21
- Latest meeting: September 27, 2026; 49ers 36, Cardinals 30
- Next meeting: January 9/10, 2027
- Stadiums: 49ers: Levi's Stadium; Cardinals: State Farm Stadium

Statistics
- Total meetings: 70
- All-time series: 49ers: 39–31
- Largest victory: 49ers: 50–14 (2003); Cardinals: 47–7 (2015)
- Most points scored: 49ers: 50 (2003); Cardinals: 47 (2015), (2024)
- Longest win streak: 49ers: 5 (1980–1987, 1993–2002, 2009–2011); Cardinals: 8 (2015–2018)
- Current win streak: 49ers: 3 (2025–present)

The 49ers–Cardinals rivalry is a National Football League (NFL) rivalry between the San Francisco 49ers and Arizona Cardinals.

After the AAFC-NFL merger, the 49ers and Cardinals faced off for the first time in the 1951 season, when the Cardinals were based in Chicago. Both teams engaged in sporadic matchups leading up to the 2000 season. During that period, the Cardinals relocated to St. Louis and subsequently, in the 1988 season, they relocated to Phoenix, Arizona, establishing themselves as a Western team. Following the NFL realignment in 2002, the Cardinals joined the NFC West, thus becoming divisional rivals with the 49ers. The rivalry is a closely contested series, particularly after the realignment. The Cardinals are the only team in the NFC the 49ers have not met in the playoffs.

The 49ers lead the overall series, 39–31. The two teams have not met in the playoffs.

== History ==
The 49ers and Cardinals first met on November 18, 1951 at the former's home field, Kezar Stadium. Behind the performance of Charley Trippi, the then-Chicago Cardinals won the game 27–21. The Cardinals would lead the series prior to the arrival of Bill Walsh, Joe Montana, and Jerry Rice to the 49ers.

Following the 1987 season, the Cardinals relocated to Phoenix, Arizona. In the 49ers' first trip to Phoenix, they blundered a 23–0 lead. The Cardinals came back and won 24–23, scoring a touchdown in the final seconds of the game.

During a 1999 game between the two teams, Cardinals cornerback Aeneas Williams delivered a sack on 49ers quarterback Steve Young. Young was concussed on the play, with his injury ultimately being a career-ending one.

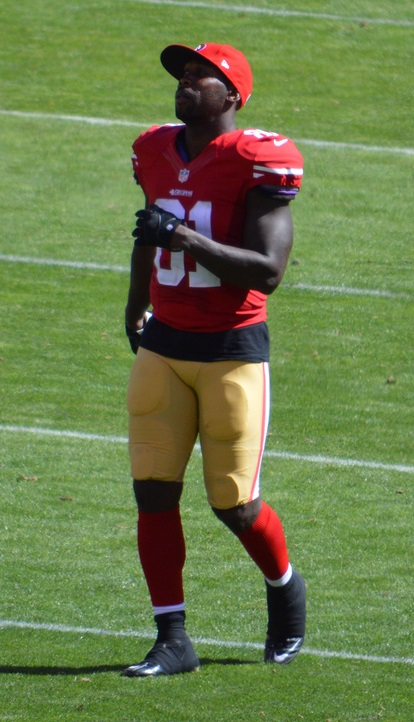
Anquan Boldin had multiple 1,000 receiving yard seasons with both the 49ers and Cardinals

The two teams became division rivals when the Cardinals moved to the NFC West, as part of the NFL's 2002 realignment. In 2004, the 49ers finished with a dismal 2–14 record; both of their 2 wins, however, came against the Cardinals. The following season, the two teams played the first NFL regular season game held outside of the United States. Dubbed Fútbol Americano, the game was played at Estadio Azteca, in Mexico City; the Cardinals won 31–14.

To kick off their 2006 season, the Cardinals hosted the 49ers at the newly opened University of Phoenix Stadium. The Cardinals won the game 34–27.

During the late 2000s and early 2010s, the 49ers and Cardinals were common Monday Night Football (MNF) opponents, having played each other five times in six years (from 2007 to 2012). In the 2007 matchup, quarterback Alex Smith led the 49ers to a comeback victory over the Cardinals to kick off the season. Also during this period, Cardinals and 49ers players were noted as often sharing hateful sentiments about the opposing side. 49ers tight end Vernon Davis and Cardinals defensive tackle Darnell Dockett were also noted exchanging barbs on Twitter. The results between the two teams were lopsided during this period, with the Cardinals winning one of ten matchups from 2009 to 2013. Then-Cardinals head coach Bruce Arians likened the rivalry to the Browns–Steelers rivalry. However, shifting into the mid-2010s, the Cardinals dominated the 49ers, winning eight straight games in the rivalry from 2015 to 2018.

The two teams once again met in Mexico for another Monday Night Football matchup in 2022. 49ers quarterback Jimmy Garoppolo passed for 4 touchdowns in the game, leading his team to a 38–10 victory.

== Season-by-season results ==
San Francisco 49ers vs. Chicago/St. Louis/Phoenix/Arizona Cardinals Season-by-Season Results
1950s (Cardinals, 2–0)

Season	Results	Location	Overall series	Notes
1951	Cardinals; 27–21	Kezar Stadium (San Francisco)	Cardinals; 1–0	As a result of the AAFC–NFL merger the previous season, the 49ers were placed in the NFL National Conference and the Cardinals were placed in the NFL American Conference (later renamed to the NFL Western Conference and the NFL Eastern Conference respectively in the 1953 season).
1957	Cardinals; 20–10	Kezar Stadium (San Francisco)	Cardinals; 2–0	Last game 49ers faced the Cardinals as a Chicago-based team, as the Cardinals relocated to St. Louis in the 1960 season. The two teams never faced off against each other in Chicago.

1960s (49ers, 2–1)

Season	Results	Location	Overall series	Notes
1962	49ers 24–17	Busch Stadium (St. Louis)	Cardinals; 2–1	First meeting in St. Louis.
1964	Cardinals; 23–13	Kezar Stadium (San Francisco)	Cardinals; 3–1	
1968	49ers 35–17	Kezar Stadium (San Francisco)	Cardinals; 3–2	49ers record their first home win against the Cardinals.

1970s (Cardinals, 4–1)

Season	Results	Location	Overall series	Notes
1971	49ers 26–14	Busch Memorial Stadium (St. Louis)	Tied; 3–3	
1974	Cardinals; 34–9	Candlestick Park (San Francisco)	Cardinals; 4–3	
1976	Cardinals; 23–20 (OT)	Busch Memorial Stadium (St. Louis)	Cardinals; 5–3	Cardinals record their first home win against the 49ers.
1978	Cardinals; 16–10	Candlestick Park (San Francisco)	Cardinals; 6–3	
1979	Cardinals; 13–10	Busch Memorial Stadium (St. Louis)	Cardinals; 7–3	

1980s (49ers, 5–1)

Season	Results	Location	Overall series	Notes
1980	49ers 24–21 (OT)	Candlestick Park (San Francisco)	Cardinals; 7–4	
1982	49ers 31–20	Busch Memorial Stadium (St. Louis)	Cardinals; 7–5	
1983	49ers 42–27	Busch Memorial Stadium (St. Louis)	Cardinals; 7–6	Final matchup played at St. Louis.
1986	49ers 43–17	Candlestick Park (San Francisco)	Tied; 7–7	
1987	49ers 34–28	Candlestick Park (San Francisco)	49ers 8–7	Last season Cardinals played as a St. Louis-based team.
1988	Cardinals; 24–23	Sun Devil Stadium (Tempe)	Tied; 8–8	Cardinals relocated to Phoenix, Arizona. Cardinals overcame a 23–0 second-half deficit. 49ers win Super Bowl XXIII.

1990s (49ers, 3–1)

Season	Results	Location	Overall series	Notes
1991	49ers 14–10	Candlestick Park (San Francisco)	49ers 9–8	
1992	Cardinals; 24–14	Sun Devil Stadium (Tempe)	Tied; 9–9	
1993	49ers 28–14	Candlestick Park (San Francisco)	49ers 10–9	
1999	49ers 24–10	Sun Devil Stadium (Tempe)	49ers 11–9	In the 1994 season, the Phoenix Cardinals changed their name to the "Arizona Cardinals". Last start in the series for 49ers' QB Steve Young.

2000s (49ers, 10–7)

Season	Season series	at San Francisco 49ers	at Arizona Cardinals	Overall series	Notes
2000	49ers 1–0	49ers 27–20	—N/a	49ers 12–9	
2002	49ers 2–0	49ers 38–28	49ers 17–14	49ers 14–9	During the NFL realignment, Cardinals were moved to the NFC West, resulting in two meetings annually with the 49ers.
2003	Tie 1–1	49ers 50–14	Cardinals; 16–13 (OT)	49ers 15–10	In San Francisco, 49ers record their largest victory over the Cardinals with a 36–point differential and scored their most points in a game against the Cardinals.
2004	49ers 2–0	49ers 31–28 (OT)	49ers 31–28 (OT)	49ers 17–10	In San Francisco, 49ers overcame a 28–12 fourth-quarter deficit. 49ers' victories against the Cardinals would be their only victories in their 2004 season.
2005	Cardinals 2–0	Cardinals; 17–10	Cardinals; 31–14	49ers 17–12	Cardinals' home game was played at the Estadio Azteca in Mexico City on Monday Night Football in the first NFL regular season game played outside the United States, marketed as Fútbol Americano. The game drew a crowd of 103,467, setting an NFL regular-season attendance record (broken in 2009).
2006	Cardinals 2–0	Cardinals; 26–20	Cardinals; 34–27	49ers 17–14	Cardinals open University of Phoenix Stadium (now known as State Farm Stadium).
2007	49ers 2–0	49ers 20–17	49ers 37–31 (OT)	49ers 19–14	
2008	Cardinals 2–0	Cardinals; 23–13	Cardinals; 29–24	49ers 19–16	Cardinals win all of their division games for the first time in franchise history. Cardinals lose Super Bowl XLIII.
2009	49ers 2–0	49ers 24–9	49ers 20–16	49ers 21–16	

2010s (Tie, 10–10)

Season	Season series	at San Francisco 49ers	at Arizona Cardinals	Overall series	Notes
2010	49ers 2–0	49ers 38–7	49ers 27–6	49ers 23–16	
2011	Tie 1–1	49ers 23–7	Cardinals; 21–19	49ers 24–17	
2012	49ers 2–0	49ers 27–13	49ers 24–3	49ers 26–17	49ers' home win clinched them the NFC West. 49ers lose Super Bowl XLVII.
2013	49ers 2–0	49ers 32–20	49ers 23–20	49ers 28–17	
2014	Tie 1–1	49ers 20–17	Cardinals; 23–14	49ers 29–18	49ers open Levi's Stadium.
2015	Cardinals 2–0	Cardinals; 19–13	Cardinals; 47–7	49ers 29–20	In Arizona, Cardinals record their largest victory over the 49ers with a 40–point differential and scored their most points in a game against the 49ers.
2016	Cardinals 2–0	Cardinals; 33–21	Cardinals; 23–20	49ers 29–22	
2017	Cardinals 2–0	Cardinals; 20–10	Cardinals; 18–15 (OT)	49ers 29–24	
2018	Cardinals 2–0	Cardinals; 28–18	Cardinals; 18–15	49ers 29–26	In Arizona, Cardinals overcame a 15–3 fourth-quarter deficit. Cardinals win eight straight meetings (2015–2018).
2019	49ers 2–0	49ers 36–26	49ers 28–25	49ers 31–26	In San Francisco, 49ers overcame a 16–0 deficit. 49ers lose Super Bowl LIV.

2020s (49ers, 8–5)

Season	Season series	at San Francisco 49ers	at Arizona Cardinals	Overall series	Notes
2020	Tie 1–1	Cardinals; 24–20	49ers 20–12	49ers 32–27	Due to COVID-19-related restrictions on contact sports in Santa Clara, 49ers played three home games at State Farm Stadium.
2021	Cardinals 2–0	Cardinals; 31–17	Cardinals; 17–10	49ers 32–29	
2022	49ers 2–0	49ers 38–13	49ers 38–10	49ers 34–29	Cardinals home game was played at Estadio Azteca in Mexico City on Monday Night Football as part of the NFL International Series.
2023	49ers 2–0	49ers 35–16	49ers 45–29	49ers 36–29	In Arizona, 49ers clinch the NFC West with their win. 49ers lose Super Bowl LVIII.
2024	Cardinals 2–0	Cardinals; 24–23	Cardinals; 47–24	49ers 36–31	In Arizona, Cardinals tied their most points scored in a game against the 49ers (2015).
2025	49ers 2–0	49ers 16–15	49ers 41–22	49ers 38–31	In San Francisco, 49ers' kicker Eddy Piñeiro kicked a game-winning 35-yard field goal on the game's final play. In Arizona, Cardinals' quarterback Jacoby Brissett set an NFL record with 47 completions, while the Cardinals were called for 17 penalties, setting a franchise record for the most penalties in a game.
2026	49ers 1–0	49ers 36–30	January 9/10	49ers 39–31	

Summary of results

Season	Season series	at San Francisco 49ers	at St. Louis/Phoenix/Arizona Cardinals	Notes
Regular season	49ers 39–31	49ers 22–15	49ers 17–16	49ers have a 4–2 record in St. Louis. Cardinals currently have a 13–12 record in Arizona. Both teams are tied 1–1 at the Estadio Azteca in Mexico City (2005), (2022), both accounted for as Arizona Cardinals home games.

== See also ==
- National Football League rivalries
- NFC West
