= 2025 Arizona Cardinals season =

106th season in franchise history, Final season under Jonathan Gannon

- Owner: Michael Bidwill
- General manager: Monti Ossenfort
- Head coach: Jonathan Gannon
- Home stadium: State Farm Stadium

Results
- Record: 3–14
- Division place: 4th NFC West
- Playoffs: Did not qualify
- All-Pros: TE Trey McBride (1st team)
- Pro Bowlers: SS Budda Baker; TE Trey McBride

Uniform
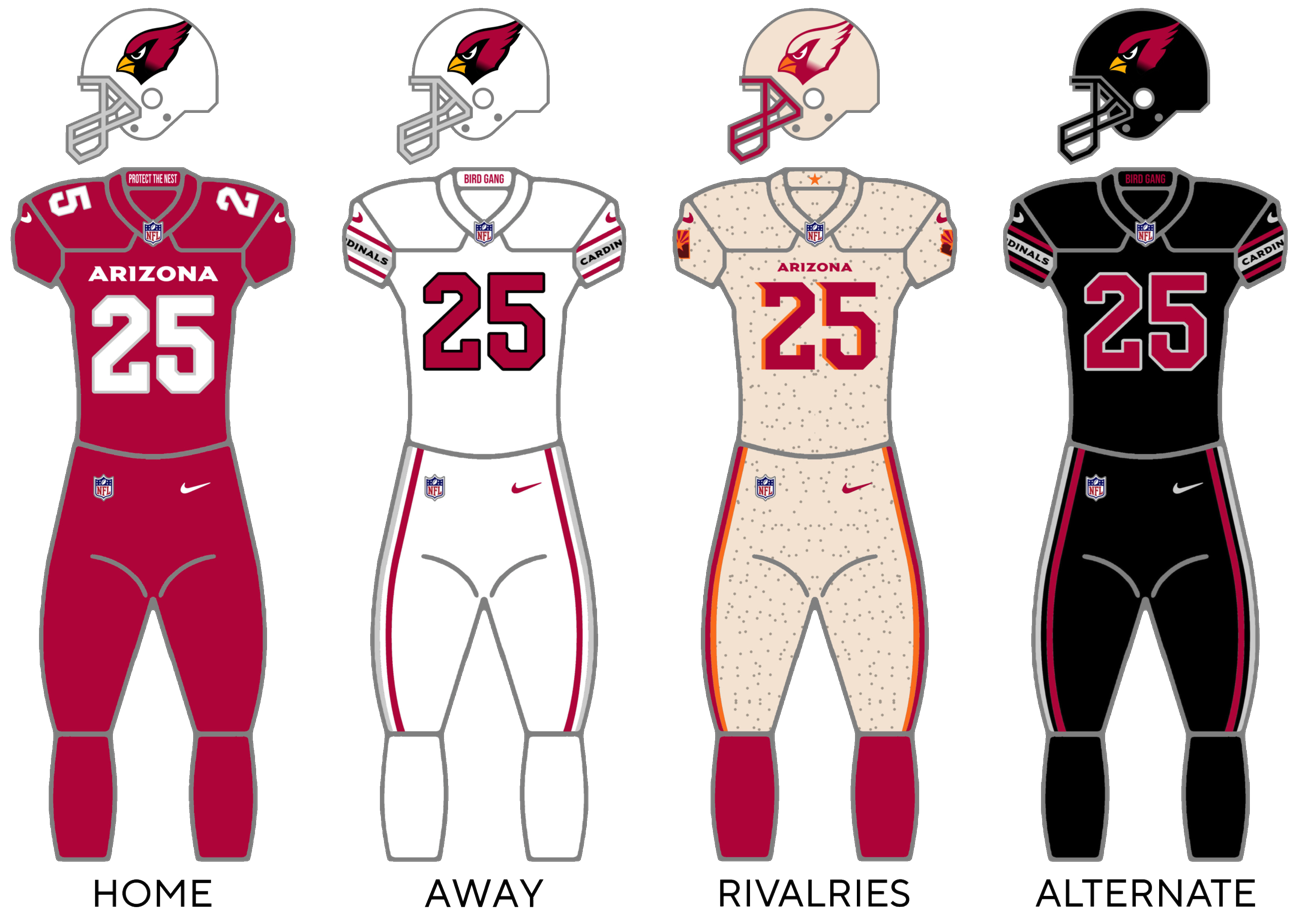

The 2025 season was the Arizona Cardinals' 106th in the National Football League (NFL), their 38th in Arizona, their 20th playing their homes games at State Farm Stadium, their third under general manager Monti Ossenfort, and their third and final under head coach Jonathan Gannon. Unable to improve on their 8–9 record from the previous season, the Cardinals missed the playoffs for the fourth consecutive season after a Week 13 loss to the Tampa Bay Buccaneers, and instead went an NFC-worst 3–14 for their 4th consecutive losing season, setting a franchise record for the most losses in a season. The Cardinals started out with a 2–0 record, but went a disastrous 1–14 (their one win during that stretch was against the Cowboys) the rest of the way, including a nine-game losing streak to end the season. Their .176 winning percentage was their worst since 1959 when they were based in Chicago. They also finished last place in the NFC West for the third time in four seasons. Gannon was fired by the Cardinals on January 5, one day following the conclusion of the season, ending his tenure with a 15–36 record through three seasons with a meager .294 winning percentage, which is the seventh-worst in NFL history by a coach who has coached at least 50 games. Michael Carter's 333 rushing yards were the lowest by a Cardinal rushing leader since John Grigas also led the team with 333 rushing yards in 1943 when they were, again, the Chicago Cardinals. The Cardinals had a four-year aggregate record of 19–49 (.279) from 2022 to 2025, the worst four-year stretch in franchise history since moving to Arizona.

== Draft ==
2025 Arizona Cardinals draft selections
Round	Selection	Player	Position	College	Notes
1	16	Walter Nolen	DT	Ole Miss	
2	47	Will Johnson	CB	Michigan	
3	78	Jordan Burch	EDGE	Oregon	
4	115	Cody Simon	ILB	Ohio State	
5	152	Traded to the Dallas Cowboys			
5	174	Denzel Burke	CB	Ohio State	From Dallas Cowboys
6	191	Traded to the Denver Broncos (Note: The Cardinals traded a 6th rounder (191st overall) to the Denver Broncos for OLB Baron Browning.)			
6	204	Traded to the Dallas Cowboys			From Dallas Cowboys
6	211	Hayden Conner	G	Texas	From Dallas Cowboys
7	225	Kitan Crawford	S	Nevada	From Jets via Chiefs (Note: The Cardinals traded DE Cameron Thomas to the Kansas City Chiefs in exchange for a seventh-round selection (225th overall).)
7	230	Traded to the Carolina Panthers (Note: The Cardinals traded a seventh-round selection (230th overall) and a 2024 sixth-round selection to the Carolina Panthers in exchange for WR Robbie Chosen.)			

2025 Arizona Cardinals undrafted free agents
Name	Position	College	Ref.
Jeremiah Byers	G	Florida State	
Oscar Cardenas	TE	UTSA	
Josh Fryar	OT	Ohio State	
Bryson Green	WR	Wisconsin	
Valentin Senn	OT	UConn	
Elijah Simmons	NT	Tennessee	

Draft trades

== Notable injuries ==
The Cardinals were plagued by injuries at all positions throughout the duration of the season, ultimately ending the 2025 season with a league-high 26 players on injured reserve. The loss of Sean Murphy-Bunting occurred in the early offseason, prior to the 2025 NFL draft. Cornerback Star Thomas V tore his ACL less than a week into training camp. In week 3, starting running back James Conner was lost for the season after tearing his right Achilles tendon. The following week, Conner's replacement Trey Benson suffered a knee injury and was placed on injured reserve. He was initially believed to be able to return later in the season, however, he was ultimately lost for the season as he underwent knee surgery. Other running backs who missed time due to injury were Emari Demercado (4 games missed) and Bam Knight (3 games missed). Adding to the team's struggles on offense, starting quarterback Kyler Murray was lost for the season with a reported foot injury following the week 5 loss. 2024 first round wide receiver Marvin Harrison Jr. missed 5 games to injury in 2025. Fellow wide receiver Zay Jones tore his Achilles tendon in week 9 and missed the rest of the season. Tight ends Tip Reiman and Travis Vokolek were lost early in the season with season-ending injuries. On the offensive line, both starters and backups were lost to season-ending injuries. Defensive backs were the most injured position on the team. Along with the loss of both Murphy-Bunting and Thomas prior to the start of the season, both starting CBs Garrett Williams and Max Melton spent time on injured reserve. Rookie cornerback Will Johnson missed 5 games while filling in for both Williams and Melton in the interim. Linebacker Mack Wilson Sr was placed on injured reserve following an injury in week 9. First round draft choice Walter Nolen III missed the first 7 games with a calf injury, then suffered a season-ending knee injury late in the season. Punter Blake Gillikin ended the season missing 12 games due to a back injury. Ultimately, 41 different players missed at least one game during the season; most of which were starters or special teams contributors.

== Staff ==
2025 Arizona Cardinals staff
Front office: Owner/chairman/president – Michael Bidwill; General manager – Monti Ossenfort; Assistant general manager – Dave Sears; Vice president of football operations & facilities – Matt Caracciolo; Director of pro personnel – Glen Fox; Vice President of player personnel – Rob Kisiel; Director of college scouting – Ryan Gold; Director of football administration – Matt Harriss; Head coaches: Head coach – Jonathan Gannon; Assistant head coach/special teams coordinator – Jeff Rodgers; Offensive coaches: Offensive coordinator – Drew Petzing; Quarterbacks – Israel Woolfork; Running backs – Autry Denson; Passing game coordinator/wide receivers – Drew Terrell; Tight ends – Ben Steele; Offensive line – Justin Frye; Assistant offensive line – Chris Cook; Pass game specialist – Connor Senger; Offensive quality control – Blaine Gautier	Defensive coaches: Defensive coordinator – Nick Rallis; Defensive line – Winston DeLattiboudere III; Linebackers – Cristian Garcia; Outside linebackers – Matt Feeney; Defensive backs – Patrick Toney; Cornerbacks – Ryan Smith; Defensive quality control – Ronald Booker; Defensive quality control – Alec Osborne; Special teams coaches: Assistant special teams – Sam Sewell; Strength and conditioning: Director, football performance – Shea Thompson; Head strength and conditioning – Evan Marcus; Assistant strength and conditioning – Everrett Gathron; Assistant strength and conditioning – Jason Benguche; Sports science coordinator/assistant strength and conditioning – Kyle Sammons; Senior reconditioning coordinator – Buddy Morris

== Final roster ==
2025 Arizona Cardinals roster
Quarterbacks (QB): 7 Jacoby Brissett; 19 Kedon Slovis; Running backs (RB): 22 Michael Carter; 31 Emari Demercado; 37 Corey Kiner; Wide receivers (WR): 86 Jalen Brooks; 83 Tejhaun Palmer; 80 Steven Sims; 89 Xavier Weaver; 14 Michael Wilson; Tight ends (TE): 49 Pharaoh Brown; 45 Josiah Deguara; 41 Rivaldo Fairweather; 84 Elijah Higgins; 85 Trey McBride	Offensive linemen (OL): 74 Isaiah Adams G; 68 Kelvin Beachum T; 62 Evan Brown G; 58 Hayden Conner G; 72 Hjalte Froholdt C; 78 Josh Fryar T; 59 Jon Gaines II G/C; 66 Demontrey Jacobs T; 75 Christian Jones T; Defensive linemen (DL): 93 Calais Campbell DE; 90 Zachary Carter DE; 91 L. J. Collier DE; 94 P. J. Mustipher NT; 56 Darius Robinson DE; 55 Dante Stills DE; 94 Dalvin Tomlinson NT	Linebackers (LB): 5 Baron Browning OLB; 52 Jordan Burch OLB; 25 Zaven Collins OLB; 27 Akeem Davis-Gaither ILB; 53 Austin Keys ILB; 9 BJ Ojulari OLB; 44 Owen Pappoe ILB; 50 Cody Simon ILB; 10 Josh Sweat OLB; 47 Channing Tindall ILB; Defensive backs (DB): 3 Budda Baker FS; 29 Denzel Burke CB; 39 Jaden Davis CB; 30 Darren Hall CB; 0 Will Johnson CB; 28 Elijah Jones CB; 35 Kalen King CB; 16 Max Melton CB; 42 Dadrion Taylor-Demerson SS; 34 Jalen Thompson SS; Special teams (ST): 46 Aaron Brewer LS; 39 Matt Haack P; 98 Joshua Karty K; 38 Chad Ryland K	Practice squad: 48 Jared Bartlett OLB; 67 Wyatt Bowles G; 41 Elliott Brown OLB; 61 Marques Cox T; 59 Denzel Daxon DE (IPP); 26 Bryson Green WR; 43 Jermar Jefferson RB; 54 Eku Leota OLB; 81 Trent Sherfield WR; 0 Logan Woodside QB; Reserve: 82 Andre Baccellia WR (IR); 33 Trey Benson RB (IR); 32 Joey Blount SS (IR); 13 Kei'Trel Clark CB (IR); 6 James Conner RB (IR); 36 Kitan Crawford FS (IR); 4 Greg Dortch WR (IR); 80 Simi Fehoko WR (IR); 12 Blake Gillikin P (IR); 18 Marvin Harrison Jr. WR (IR); 76 Will Hernandez G (IR); 70 Paris Johnson Jr. T (IR); 93 Justin Jones DE (IR); 17 Zay Jones WR (IR); 20 Bam Knight RB (IR); 23 Sean Murphy-Bunting CB (NF-Ill.); 92 Bilal Nichols DE (IR); 97 Walter Nolen DE (IR); 87 Tip Reiman TE (IR); 51 J. J. Russell ILB (IR); 69 Valentin Senn T (IR); 24 Starling Thomas V CB (IR); 81 Travis Vokolek TE (IR); 21 Garrett Williams CB (IR); 73 Jonah Williams T (IR); 2 Mack Wilson ILB (IR); Rookies in italics 55 active, 26 reserve, 10 practice squad

== Preseason ==
Week	Date	Opponent	Result	Record	Venue	Sources
1	August 9	Kansas City Chiefs	W 20–17	1–0	State Farm Stadium	Recap
2	August 16	at Denver Broncos	L 7–27	1–1	Empower Field at Mile High	Recap
3	August 23	Las Vegas Raiders	W 20–10	2–1	State Farm Stadium	Recap

== Regular season ==
=== Schedule ===
Week	Date	Opponent	Result	Record	Venue	Sources
1	September 7	at New Orleans Saints	**W** 20–13	1–0	Caesars Superdome	Recap
2	September 14	Carolina Panthers	**W** 27–22	2–0	State Farm Stadium	Recap
3	September 21	at **San Francisco 49ers**	**L** 15–16	2–1	Levi's Stadium	Recap
4	September 25	**Seattle Seahawks**	**L** 20–23	2–2	State Farm Stadium	Recap
5	October 5	Tennessee Titans	**L** 21–22	2–3	State Farm Stadium	Recap
6	October 12	at Indianapolis Colts	**L** 27–31	2–4	Lucas Oil Stadium	Recap
7	October 19	Green Bay Packers	**L** 23–27	2–5	State Farm Stadium	Recap
8	Bye					
9	November 3	at Dallas Cowboys	**W** 27–17	3–5	AT&T Stadium	Recap
10	November 9	at **Seattle Seahawks**	**L** 22–44	3–6	Lumen Field	Recap
11	November 16	**San Francisco 49ers**	**L** 22–41	3–7	State Farm Stadium	Recap
12	November 23	Jacksonville Jaguars	**L** 24–27 (OT)	3–8	State Farm Stadium	Recap
13	November 30	at Tampa Bay Buccaneers	**L** 17–20	3–9	Raymond James Stadium	Recap
14	December 7	**Los Angeles Rams**	**L** 17–45	3–10	State Farm Stadium	Recap
15	December 14	at Houston Texans	**L** 20–40	3–11	NRG Stadium	Recap
16	December 21	Atlanta Falcons	**L** 19–26	3–12	State Farm Stadium	Recap
17	December 28	at Cincinnati Bengals	**L** 14–37	3–13	Paycor Stadium	Recap
18	January 4	at **Los Angeles Rams**	**L** 20–37	3–14	SoFi Stadium	Recap

Note: Intra-division opponents are in bold text.

=== Game summaries ===
==== Week 1: at New Orleans Saints ====
Week 1: Arizona Cardinals at New Orleans Saints – Game summary

Quarter	1	2	3	4	Total
**Cardinals**	3	14	3	0	**20**
Saints	0	10	0	3	**13**

at Caesars Superdome, New Orleans, Louisiana

- Date: September 7
- Game time: 12:00 p.m. CDT/10:00 a.m. MST
- Game weather: None (indoor stadium)
- Game attendance: 70,006
- Referee: Scott Novak
- TV announcers (CBS): Tom McCarthy, Ross Tucker, Logan Ryan and Tiffany Blackmon
- Recap, Game Book

Game information

**First quarter**

- ARI – Chad Ryland 42-yard field goal, 5:03. Cardinals 3–0. **Drive: 11 plays, 42 yards, 5:31.**

**Second quarter**

- NO – Alvin Kamara 18-yard run (Blake Grupe kick), 14:20. Saints 7–3. **Drive: 10 plays, 75 yards, 5:43.**
- ARI – Marvin Harrison Jr. 1-yard pass from Kyler Murray (Chad Ryland kick), 10:05. Cardinals 10–7. **Drive: 7 plays, 65 yards, 4:15.**
- NO – Blake Grupe 36-yard field goal, 4:58. Tied 10–10. **Drive: 10 plays, 37 yards, 5:07.**
- ARI – James Conner 4-yard pass from Kyler Murray (Chad Ryland kick), 0:28. Cardinals 17–10. **Drive: 10 plays, 71 yards, 4:30.**

**Third quarter**

- ARI – Chad Ryland 50-yard field goal, 9:16. Cardinals 20–10. **Drive: 6 plays, 49 yards, 3:11.**

**Fourth quarter**

- NO – Blake Grupe 28-yard field goal, 2:42. Cardinals 20–13. **Drive: 9 plays, 54 yards, 1:52.**

**Top passers**

- ARI – Kyler Murray – 21/29, 163 yards, 2 TD
- NO – Spencer Rattler – 27/45, 214 yards

**Top rushers**

- ARI – Trey Benson – 8 rushes, 69 yards
- NO – Alvin Kamara – 11 rushes, 45 yards, TD

**Top receivers**

- ARI – Marvin Harrison Jr. – 5 receptions, 71 yards, TD
- NO – Juwan Johnson – 8 receptions, 76 yards

Even though quarterback Kyler Murray was feeling ill when he awoke that day he passed for 163 yards, 21/29 attempts, and 2 touchdowns. Despite getting shut out in the fourth quarter, the Cardinals held on to secure a 1–0 record. It was the Cardinals' first win in New Orleans since the 1996 season.

==== Week 2: vs. Carolina Panthers ====
Week 2: Carolina Panthers at Arizona Cardinals – Game summary

Quarter	1	2	3	4	Total
Panthers	3	0	6	13	**22**
**Cardinals**	10	10	7	0	**27**

at State Farm Stadium, Glendale, Arizona

- Date: September 14
- Game time: 1:05 p.m. MST
- Game weather: None (retractable roof closed)
- Game attendance: 64,003
- Referee: Ron Torbert
- TV announcers (CBS): Spero Dedes, Adam Archuleta and Aditi Kinkhabwala
- Recap, Game Book

Game information

**First quarter**

- ARI – Zaven Collins 3-yard fumble return (Chad Ryland kick), 13:27. Cardinals 7–0.
- ARI – Chad Ryland 29-yard field goal, 5:19. Cardinals 10–0. **Drive: 6 plays, 37 yards, 3:34.**
- CAR – Ryan Fitzgerald 27-yard field goal, 0:50. Cardinals 10–3. **Drive: 9 plays, 55 yards, 4:29.**

**Second quarter**

- ARI – Chad Ryland 47-yard field goal, 1:55. Cardinals 13–3. **Drive: 10 plays, 61 yards, 5:24.**
- ARI – Michael Wilson 11-yard pass from Kyler Murray (Chad Ryland kick), 0:04. Cardinals 20–3. **Drive: 6 plays, 45 yards, 0:47.**

**Third quarter**

- ARI – James Conner 2-yard run (Chad Ryland kick), 9:23. Cardinals 27–3. **Drive: 9 plays, 71 yards, 5:37.**
- CAR – Hunter Renfrow 4-yard pass from Bryce Young (run failed), 2:06. Cardinals 27–9. **Drive: 14 plays, 76 yards, 7:17.**

**Fourth quarter**

- CAR – Chuba Hubbard 5-yard pass from Bryce Young (run failed), 5:05. Cardinals 27–15. **Drive: 14 plays, 88 yards, 5:27.**
- CAR – Hunter Renfrow 1-yard pass from Bryce Young (Ryan Fitzgerald kick), 1:58. Cardinals 27–22. **Drive: 12 plays, 76 yards, 2:33.**

**Top passers**

- CAR – Bryce Young – 35/55, 328 yards, 3 TD, INT
- ARI – Kyler Murray – 17/25, 220 yards, TD, INT

**Top rushers**

- CAR – Chuba Hubbard – 10 rushes, 38 yards
- ARI – James Conner – 11 rushes, 34 yards, TD

**Top receivers**

- CAR – Tetairoa McMillan – 6 receptions, 100 yards
- ARI – Trey McBride – 6 receptions, 78 yards

Despite taking a 27–3 lead into the fourth quarter, the Cardinals had to fend off a late Panthers comeback. Defensive end Calais Campbell sealed the 27–22 victory with a game-ending sack on Panthers quarterback Bryce Young, allowing Arizona to hold on for the win. This would turn out to be the Cardinals’ only home win of the season.

==== Week 3: at San Francisco 49ers ====
Week 3: Arizona Cardinals at San Francisco 49ers – Game summary

Quarter	1	2	3	4	Total
Cardinals	0	3	3	9	**15**
**49ers**	0	6	0	10	**16**

at Levi's Stadium, Santa Clara, California

- Date: September 21
- Game time: 1:25 p.m. MST & PDT
- Game weather: Sunny, 72 °F (22 °C)
- Game attendance: 70,414
- Referee: John Hussey
- TV announcers (Fox): Adam Amin, Mark Sanchez and Kristina Pink
- Recap, Game Book

Game information

**First quarter**

- No scoring plays.

**Second quarter**

- ARI – Chad Ryland 34-yard field goal, 8:45. Cardinals 3–0. **Drive: 8 plays, 49 yards, 6:09.**
- SF – Eddy Piñeiro 38-yard field goal, 4:22. Tied 3–3. **Drive: 9 plays, 49 yards, 4:23.**
- SF – Eddy Piñeiro 51-yard field goal, 0:17. 49ers 6–3. **Drive: 11 plays, 53 yards, 1:51.**

**Third quarter**

- ARI – Chad Ryland 28-yard field goal, 6:37. Tied 6–6. **Drive: 15 plays, 77 yards, 6:35.**

**Fourth quarter**

- SF – Kyle Juszczyk 1-yard pass from Mac Jones (Eddy Piñeiro kick), 10:50. 49ers 13–6. **Drive: 6 plays, 48 yards, 3:09.**
- ARI – Trey McBride 1-yard pass from Kyler Murray (Chad Ryland kick), 8:37. Tied 13–13. **Drive: 4 plays, 65 yards, 2:13.**
- ARI – Penalty on Dominick Puni enforced in end zone for safety, 3:15. Cardinals 15–13.
- SF – Eddy Piñeiro 35-yard field goal, 0:00. 49ers 16–15. **Drive: 10 plays, 63 yards, 1:46.**

**Top passers**

- ARI – Kyler Murray – 22/35, 159 yards, TD
- SF – Mac Jones – 27/41, 284 yards, TD, INT

**Top rushers**

- ARI – Trey Benson – 10 rushes, 42 yards
- SF – Christian McCaffrey – 17 rushes, 52 yards

**Top receivers**

- ARI – Marvin Harrison Jr. – 3 receptions, 44 yards
- SF – Ricky Pearsall – 8 receptions, 117 yards

With the loss on a last second field goal, the Cardinals fell to 2–1. During the second half star running back James Conner was lost for the season with a gruesome ankle injury.

==== Week 4: vs. Seattle Seahawks ====
Week 4: Seattle Seahawks at Arizona Cardinals – Game summary

Quarter	1	2	3	4	Total
**Seahawks**	7	7	3	6	**23**
Cardinals	3	0	3	14	**20**

at State Farm Stadium, Glendale, Arizona

- Date: September 25
- Game time: 5:15 p.m. MST
- Game weather: None (retractable roof closed)
- Game attendance: 65,016
- Referee: Alex Kemp
- TV announcers (Prime Video): Al Michaels, Kirk Herbstreit and Kaylee Hartung
- Recap, Game Book

Game information

**First quarter**

- ARI – Chad Ryland 33-yard field goal, 4:37. Cardinals 3–0. **Drive: 6 plays, 33 yards, 4:09.**
- SEA – AJ Barner 16-yard pass from Sam Darnold (Jason Myers kick), 1:33. Seahawks 7–3. **Drive: 7 plays, 77 yards, 3:04.**

**Second quarter**

- SEA – Zach Charbonnet 1-yard run (Jason Myers kick), 1:01. Seahawks 14–3. **Drive: 7 plays, 90 yards, 2:44.**

**Third quarter**

- SEA – Jason Myers 44-yard field goal, 8:56. Seahawks 17–3. **Drive: 10 plays, 40 yards, 6:04.**
- ARI – Chad Ryland 57-yard field goal, 1:39. Seahawks 17–6. **Drive: 7 plays, 23 yards, 3:11.**

**Fourth quarter**

- SEA – Jason Myers 31-yard field goal, 9:33. Seahawks 20–6. **Drive: 14 plays, 53 yards, 7:06.**
- ARI – Marvin Harrison Jr. 16-yard pass from Kyler Murray (Chad Ryland kick), 5:50. Seahawks 20–13. **Drive: 8 plays, 73 yards, 3:43.**
- ARI – Emari Demercado 7-yard pass from Kyler Murray (Chad Ryland kick), 0:28. Tied 20–20. **Drive: 12 plays, 57 yards, 2:48.**
- SEA – Jason Myers 52-yard field goal, 0:00. Seahawks 23–20. **Drive: 4 plays, 26 yards, 0:28.**

**Top passers**

- SEA – Sam Darnold – 18/26, 242 yards, TD
- ARI – Kyler Murray – 27/42, 200 yards, 2 TD, 2 INT

**Top receivers**

- SEA – Kenneth Walker III – 19 rushes, 81 yards
- ARI – Kyler Murray – 5 rushes, 41 yards

**Top receivers**

- SEA – Jaxon Smith-Njigba – 4 receptions, 79 yards
- ARI – Marvin Harrison Jr. – 6 receptions, 66 yards, TD

With their eighth consecutive loss to the Seahawks, and the second consecutive on a last second field goal, the Cardinals fell to 2–2.

==== Week 5: vs. Tennessee Titans ====
Week 5: Tennessee Titans at Arizona Cardinals – Game summary

Quarter	1	2	3	4	Total
**Titans**	3	3	0	16	**22**
Cardinals	14	7	0	0	**21**

at State Farm Stadium, Glendale, Arizona

- Date: October 5
- Game time: 1:05 p.m. MST
- Game weather: None (retractable roof closed)
- Game attendance: 64,280
- Referee: Shawn Smith
- TV announcers (CBS): Spero Dedes, Adam Archuleta and Aditi Kinkhabwala
- Recap, Game Book

Game information

**First quarter**

- ARI – Michael Carter 1-yard run (Chad Ryland kick), 10:54. Cardinals 7–0. **Drive: 8 plays, 67 yards, 4:06.**
- TEN – Joey Slye 44-yard field goal, 5:00. Cardinals 7–3. **Drive: 12 plays, 44 yards, 5:54.**
- ARI – Kyler Murray 12-yard run (Chad Ryland kick), 0:39. Cardinals 14–3. **Drive: 7 plays, 65 yards, 4:21.**

**Second quarter**

- ARI – Bam Knight 1-yard run (Chad Ryland kick), 10:43. Cardinals 21–3. **Drive: 4 plays, 27 yards, 1:32.**
- TEN – Joey Slye 51-yard field goal, 8:29. Cardinals 21–6. **Drive: 4 plays, 1 yard, 2:14.**

**Third quarter**

- No scoring plays

**Fourth quarter**

- TEN – Tony Pollard 1-yard run (kick failed), 10:26. Cardinals 21–12. **Drive: 6 plays, 80 yards, 2:14.**
- TEN – Tyler Lockett fumble recovery in end zone (Joey Slye kick), 4:39. Cardinals 21–19. **Drive: 8 plays, 61 yards, 4:06.**
- TEN – Joey Slye 29-yard field goal, 0:00. Titans 22–21. **Drive: 11 plays, 71 yards, 1:53.**

**Top passers**

- TEN – Cam Ward – 21/39, 265 yards, INT
- ARI – Kyler Murray – 23/31, 220 yards

**Top rushers**

- TEN – Tony Pollard – 14 rushes, 67 yards, TD
- ARI – Emari Demercado – 3 rushes, 81 yards

**Top receivers**

- TEN – Calvin Ridley – 5 receptions, 131 yards
- ARI – Marvin Harrison Jr. – 4 receptions, 98 yards

The Cardinals blew a 21–3 lead and suffered an embarrassing defeat, falling to 2–3 on the season. Arizona led 21–6 entering the fourth quarter before a series of critical mistakes shifted momentum. Running back Emari Demercado appeared to have all but sealed the game with a 72-yard touchdown run with 12:51 remaining, but he dropped the ball just before crossing the goal line, resulting in a touchback. Later in the quarter, safety Dadrion Taylor-Demerson intercepted a pass from Cam Ward but immediately fumbled. Titans receiver Tyler Lockett recovered the ball in the end zone, cutting the Cardinals' lead to 21–19 with 4:51 left. After a subsequent punt, the Cardinals allowed the Titans to drive down the field, setting up a 29-yard game-winning field goal by Joey Slye as time expired. The Titans won 22–21, snapping a 10-game losing streak and giving rookie quarterback Cam Ward his first NFL victory.

The game also marked the first time in NFL history that a team lost three consecutive games on a field goal as time expired. It was the Cardinals' first home loss to the Titans since the 1997 season, when the franchise was known as the Tennessee Oilers.

On the sideline, head coach Jonathan Gannon lectured Demercado before seemingly hitting him in the arm. Gannon later apologized to Demercado and was fined $100,000 by the team.

==== Week 6: at Indianapolis Colts ====
Week 6: Arizona Cardinals at Indianapolis Colts – Game summary

Quarter	1	2	3	4	Total
Cardinals	7	3	14	3	**27**
**Colts**	7	7	3	14	**31**

at Lucas Oil Stadium, Indianapolis, Indiana

- Date: October 12
- Game time: 1:00 p.m. EDT/10:00 a.m. MST
- Game weather: Sunny, 57 °F (14 °C) (retractable roof open)
- Game attendance: 65,523
- Referee: Shawn Hochuli
- TV announcers (Fox): Kevin Kugler, Daryl Johnston and Allison Williams
- Recap, Game Book

Game information

**First quarter**

- IND – Tyler Warren 8-yard pass from Daniel Jones (Michael Badgley kick), 11:01. Colts 7–0. **Drive: 9 plays, 65 yards, 3:59.**
- ARI – Bam Knight 1-yard run (Chad Ryland kick), 1:42. Tied 7–7. **Drive: 11 plays, 56 yards, 6:12.**

**Second quarter**

- IND – Daniel Jones 3-yard run (Michael Badgley kick), 7:51. Colts 14–7. **Drive: 9 plays, 87 yards, 5:18.**
- ARI – Chad Ryland 40-yard field goal, 1:56. Colts 14–10. **Drive: 13 plays, 48 yards, 5:55.**

**Third quarter**

- ARI – Trey McBride 1-yard pass from Jacoby Brissett (Chad Ryland kick), 8:39. Cardinals 17–14. **Drive: 10 plays, 61 yards, 6:21.**
- IND – Michael Badgley 45-yard field goal, 4:31. Tied 17–17. **Drive: 9 plays, 42 yards, 4:08.**
- ARI – Greg Dortch 12-yard pass from Jacoby Brissett (Chad Ryland kick), 1:22. Cardinals 24–17. **Drive: 6 plays, 66 yards, 3:09.**

**Fourth quarter**

- IND – Josh Downs 5-yard pass from Daniel Jones (Michael Badgley kick), 13:12. Tied 24–24. **Drive: 6 plays, 67 yards, 3:10.**
- ARI – Chad Ryland 44-yard field goal, 9:31. Cardinals 27–24. **Drive: 9 plays, 34 yards, 3:41.**
- IND – Jonathan Taylor 1-yard run (Michael Badgley kick), 4:32. Colts 31–27. **Drive: 9 plays, 66 yards, 4:59.**

**Top passers**

- ARI – Jacoby Brissett – 27/44, 320 yards, 2 TD, INT
- IND – Daniel Jones – 22/30, 212 yards, 2 TD, INT

**Top rushers**

- ARI – Bam Knight – 11 rushes, 34 yards, TD
- IND – Jonathan Taylor – 21 rushes, 123 yards, TD

**Top receivers**

- ARI – Zay Jones – 5 receptions, 79 yards
- IND – Tyler Warren – 6 receptions, 63 yards, TD

Jacoby Brissett started in place of an injured Kyler Murray. Despite a close game, Arizona would find themselves yet again on the losing end, suffering their 4th straight loss falling to 2–4.

==== Week 7: vs. Green Bay Packers ====
Week 7: Green Bay Packers at Arizona Cardinals – Game summary

Quarter	1	2	3	4	Total
**Packers**	0	6	7	14	**27**
Cardinals	3	10	7	3	**23**

at State Farm Stadium, Glendale, Arizona

- Date: October 19
- Game time: 1:25 p.m. MST
- Game weather: None (retractable roof closed)
- Game attendance: 64,810
- Referee: Alex Moore
- TV announcers (Fox): Kenny Albert, Jonathan Vilma and Jen Hale
- Recap, Game Book

Game information

**First quarter**

- ARI – Chad Ryland 32-yard field goal, 7:34. Cardinals 3–0. **Drive: 15 plays, 59 yards, 7:26.**

**Second quarter**

- GB – Lucas Havrisik 31-yard field goal, 9:06. Tied 3–3. **Drive: 9 plays, 67 yards, 4:20.**
- ARI – Chad Ryland 40-yard field goal, 5:02. Cardinals 6–3. **Drive: 8 plays, 49 yards, 4:04.**
- ARI – Trey McBride 15-yard pass from Jacoby Brissett (Chad Ryland kick), 0:07. Cardinals 13–3. **Drive: 9 plays, 71 yards, 2:57.**
- GB – Lucas Havrisik 61-yard field goal, 0:00. Cardinals 13–6. **Drive: 2 plays, 22 yards, 0:07.**

**Third quarter**

- GB – Josh Jacobs 7-yard run (Lucas Havrisik kick), 9:47. Tied 13–13. **Drive: 4 plays, 44 yards, 1:56.**
- ARI – Trey McBride 12-yard pass from Jacoby Brissett (Chad Ryland kick), 4:17. Cardinals 20–13. **Drive: 9 plays, 65 yards, 5:30.**

**Fourth quarter**

- GB – Tucker Kraft 7-yard pass from Jordan Love (Lucas Havrisik kick), 14:55. Tied 20–20. **Drive: 9 plays, 67 yards, 4:22.**
- ARI – Chad Ryland 39-yard field goal, 9:01. Cardinals 23–20. **Drive: 11 plays, 24 yards, 5:54.**
- GB – Josh Jacobs 1-yard run (Lucas Havrisik kick), 1:50. Packers 27–23. **Drive: 10 plays, 48 yards, 4:01.**

**Top passers**

- GB – Jordan Love – 19/29, 179 yards, TD
- ARI – Jacoby Brissett – 25/36, 279 yards, 2 TD

**Top rushers**

- GB – Josh Jacobs – 13 rushes, 55 yards, 2 TD
- ARI – Bam Knight – 14 rushes, 57 yards

**Top receivers**

- GB – Romeo Doubs – 6 receptions, 72 yards
- ARI – Trey McBride – 10 receptions, 74 yards, 2 TD

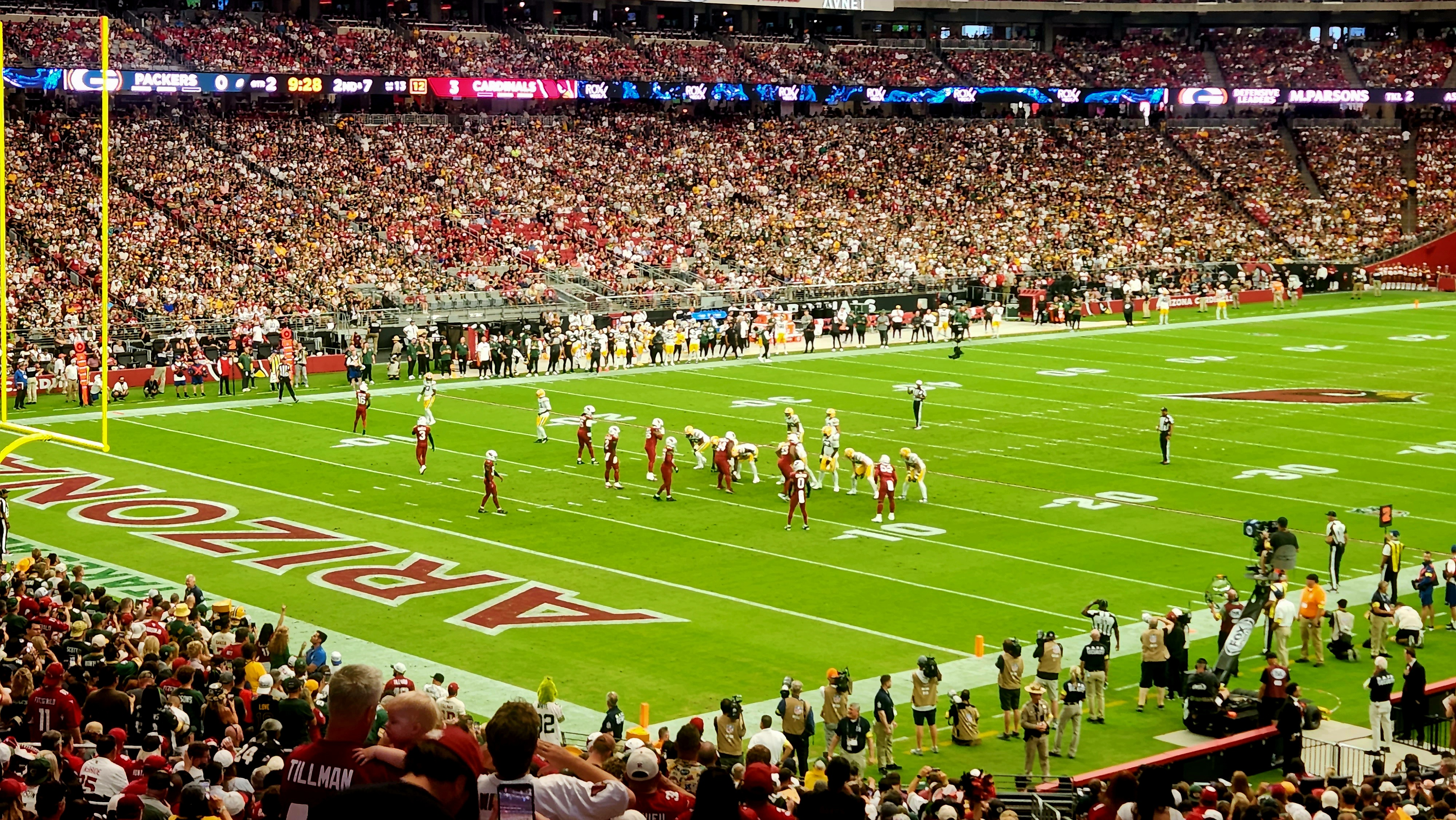
The Packers offense lining up against the Cardinals defense during the game

Despite leading for most of the game, the Cardinals allowed Packers running back Josh Jacobs to score the go-ahead touchdown with under two minutes remaining. Arizona attempted a final comeback, but a critical sack by defensive end Micah Parsons ended any chance of a rally, sealing the Cardinals' fifth consecutive loss.

The Cardinals became the first team in NFL history to lose three consecutive games after leading by 7 or more points entering the fourth quarter. Arizona joined the 2017 49ers and the 1984 Browns as the only teams in NFL history to lose five straight games by four points or fewer. Their five-game losing streak came by a combined total of just 13 points.

==== Week 9: at Dallas Cowboys ====
Week 9: Arizona Cardinals at Dallas Cowboys – Game summary

Quarter	1	2	3	4	Total
**Cardinals**	3	14	10	0	**27**
Cowboys	0	7	3	7	**17**

at AT&T Stadium, Arlington, Texas

- Date: November 3
- Game time: 7:15 p.m. CST/6:15 p.m. MST
- Game weather: None (retractable roof closed)
- Game attendance: 92,211
- Referee: Adrian Hill
- TV announcers (ESPN/ABC): Joe Buck, Troy Aikman, Lisa Salters and Laura Rutledge
- Recap, Game Book

Game information

**First quarter**

- ARI – Chad Ryland 48-yard field goal, 3:38. Cardinals 3–0. **Drive: 15 plays, 60 yards, 6:54.**

**Second quarter**

- ARI – Marvin Harrison Jr. 4-yard pass from Jacoby Brissett (Chad Ryland kick), 12:17. Cardinals 10–0. **Drive: 8 plays, 47 yards, 4:45.**
- DAL – Marshawn Kneeland blocked punt recovery (Brandon Aubrey kick), 3:58. Cardinals 10–7.
- ARI – Jacoby Brissett 1-yard run (Chad Ryland kick), 0:49. Cardinals 17–7. **Drive: 11 plays, 74 yards, 3:09.**

**Third quarter**

- ARI – Trey McBride 12-yard pass from Jacoby Brissett (Chad Ryland kick), 12:48. Cardinals 24–7. **Drive: 3 plays, 74 yards, 2:12.**
- DAL – Brandon Aubrey 26-yard field goal, 7:15. Cardinals 24–10. **Drive: 12 plays, 65 yards, 5:33.**
- ARI – Chad Ryland 34-yard field goal, 2:31. Cardinals 27–10. **Drive: 9 plays, 45 yards, 4:44.**

**Fourth quarter**

- DAL – Ryan Flournoy 5-yard pass from Dak Prescott (Brandon Aubrey kick), 10:51. Cardinals 27–17. **Drive: 7 plays, 78 yards, 2:01.**

**Top passers**

- ARI – Jacoby Brissett – 21/31, 261 yards, 2 TD
- DAL – Dak Prescott – 24/39, 250 yards, TD, INT

**Top rushers**

- ARI – Emari Demercado – 14 rushes, 79 yards
- DAL – Javonte Williams – 15 rushes, 83 yards

**Top receivers**

- ARI – Marvin Harrison Jr. – 7 receptions, 96 yards, TD
- DAL – CeeDee Lamb – 7 receptions, 85 yards

With their fourth win against Dallas since 2020, the Cardinals snapped their 5-game losing streak and improved to 3–5. This, however, would be their last win of the season, as they would end the season on a 9-game losing streak - a franchise record.

==== Week 10: at Seattle Seahawks ====
Week 10: Arizona Cardinals at Seattle Seahawks – Game summary

Quarter	1	2	3	4	Total
Cardinals	0	7	8	7	**22**
**Seahawks**	21	17	0	6	**44**

at Lumen Field, Seattle, Washington

- Date: November 9
- Game time: 2:05 p.m. MST/1:05 p.m. PST
- Game weather: Cloudy, 59 °F (15 °C)
- Game attendance: 68,723
- Referee: Alan Eck
- TV announcers (CBS): Kevin Harlan, Trent Green and Melanie Collins
- Recap, Game Book

Game information

**First quarters**

- SEA – Jaxon Smith-Njigba 43-yard pass from Sam Darnold (Jason Myers kick), 10:55. Seahawks 7–0. **Drive: 7 plays, 65 yards, 4:05.**
- SEA – DeMarcus Lawrence 34-yard fumble recovery (Jason Myers kick), 9:22. Seahawks 14–0.
- SEA – George Holani 9-yard run (Jason Myers kick), 1:23. Seahawks 21–0. **Drive: 9 plays, 81 yards, 4:51.**

**Second quarter**

- SEA – DeMarcus Lawrence 22-yard fumble recovery (Jason Myers kick), 14:08. Seahawks 28–0.
- SEA – Zach Charbonnet 6-yard run (Jason Myers kick), 8:33. Seahawks 35–0. **Drive: 6 plays, 76 yards, 3:44.**
- ARI – Greg Dortch 4-yard run (Chad Ryland kick), 2:50. Seahawks 35–7. **Drive: 2 plays, 3 yards, 0:37.**
- SEA – Jason Myers 46-yard field goal, 1:37. Seahawks 38–7. **Drive: 6 plays, 35 yards, 1:13.**

**Third quarter**

- ARI – Trey McBride 15-yard pass from Jacoby Brissett (Jacoby Brissett–Marvin Harrison Jr. pass), 8:42. Seahawks 38–15. **Drive: 4 plays, 19 yards, 0:57.**

**Fourth quarter**

- SEA – Jason Myers 32-yard field goal, 11:54. Seahawks 41–15. **Drive: 13 plays, 79 yards, 7:38.**
- ARI – Marvin Harrison Jr. 9-yard pass from Jacoby Brissett (Chad Ryland kick), 9:50. Seahawks 41–22. **Drive: 8 plays, 84 yards, 2:04.**
- SEA – Jason Myers 34-yard field goal, 5:34. Seahawks 44–22. **Drive: 7 plays, 30 yards, 4:19.**

**Top passers**

- ARI – Jacoby Brissett – 22/44, 258 yards, 2 TD
- SEA – Sam Darnold – 10/12, 178 yards, TD, INT

**Top rushers**

- ARI – Emari Demercado – 4 rushes, 64 yards
- SEA – Zach Charbonnet – 14 rushes, 83 yards, TD

**Top receivers**

- ARI – Trey McBride – 9 receptions, 127 yards, TD
- SEA – Jaxon Smith-Njigba – 5 receptions, 93 yards, TD

With their ninth loss to the Seahawks, the Cardinals were swept by Seattle for the fourth year in a row and fell to 3–6.

==== Week 11: vs. San Francisco 49ers ====
Week 11: San Francisco 49ers at Arizona Cardinals – Game summary

Quarter	1	2	3	4	Total
**49ers**	13	12	10	6	**41**
Cardinals	7	3	0	12	**22**

at State Farm Stadium, Glendale, Arizona

- Date: November 16
- Game time: 2:05 p.m. MST
- Game weather: Mostly cloudy, 73 °F (23 °C) (retractable roof open)
- Game attendance: 65,032
- Referee: Carl Cheffers
- TV announcers (Fox): Kevin Kugler, Daryl Johnston and Allison Williams
- Recap, Game Book

Game information

**First quarter**

- SF – Christian McCaffrey 1-yard run (Eddy Pineiro kick), 14:44. 49ers 7–0. **Drive: 1 play, 1 yard, 0:16.**
- SF – George Kittle 30-yard pass from Brock Purdy (kick blocked), 9:51. 49ers 13–0. **Drive: 5 plays, 70 yards, 2:08.**
- ARI – Bam Knight 6-yard run (Chad Ryland kick), 4:58. 49ers 13–7. **Drive: 9 plays, 72 yards, 4:53.**

**Second quarter**

- SF – Christian McCaffrey 9-yard pass from Brock Purdy (kick failed), 13:39. 49ers 19–7. **Drive: 5 plays, 52 yards, 2:16.**
- ARI – Chad Ryland 26-yard field goal, 6:29. 49ers 19–10. **Drive: 12 plays, 63 yards, 7:10.**
- SF – Eddy Pineiro 48-yard field goal, 1:01. 49ers 22–10. **Drive: 6 plays, 31 yards, 1:49.**
- SF – Eddy Pineiro 47-yard field goal, 0:00. 49ers 25–10. **Drive: 3 plays, 38 yards, 0:19.**

**Third quarter**

- SF – Eddy Pineiro 47-yard field goal, 7:27. 49ers 28–10. **Drive: 9 plays, 39 yards, 5:05.**
- SF – George Kittle 4-yard pass from Brock Purdy (Eddy Pineiro kick), 2:32. 49ers 35–10. **Drive: 5 plays, 14 yards, 1:50.**

**Fourth quarter**

- ARI – Trey McBride 10-yard pass from Jacoby Brissett (run failed), 8:28. 49ers 35–16. **Drive: 10 plays, 65 yards, 3:17.**
- SF – Christian McCaffrey 4-yard run (pass failed), 4:44. 49ers 41–16. **Drive: 7 plays, 45 yards, 3:44.**
- ARI – Greg Dortch 17-yard pass from Jacoby Brissett (pass failed), 2:43. 49ers 41–22. **Drive: 8 plays, 65 yards, 2:01.**

**Top passers**

- SF – Brock Purdy – 19/26, 200 yards, 3 TD
- ARI – Jacoby Brissett – 47/57, 452 yards, 2 TD, 2 INT

**Top rushers**

- SF – Christian McCaffrey – 13 rushes, 81 yards, 2 TD
- ARI – Bam Knight – 5 rushes, 24 yards, TD

**Top receivers**

- SF – George Kittle – 6 receptions, 67 yards, 2 TD
- ARI – Michael Wilson – 15 receptions, 185 yards

The Cardinals were called for a franchise-record 17 penalties, the most by any NFL team prior to Week 15. Despite Jacoby Brissett recording an NFL-record 47 completions, it was not enough, as Arizona was blown out by the 49ers.

==== Week 12: vs. Jacksonville Jaguars ====
Week 12: Jacksonville Jaguars at Arizona Cardinals – Game summary

Quarter	1	2	3	4	OT	Total
**Jaguars**	7	3	7	7	3	**27**
Cardinals	7	7	0	10	0	**24**

at State Farm Stadium, Glendale, Arizona

- Date: November 23
- Game time: 2:05 p.m. MST
- Game weather: None (retractable roof closed)
- Game attendance: 62,413
- Referee: Scott Novak
- TV announcers (CBS): Spero Dedes, Adam Archuleta and Aditi Kinkhabwala
- Recap, Game Book

Game information

**First quarter**

- JAX – Travis Etienne 15-yard pass from Trevor Lawrence (Cam Little kick), 7:10. Jaguars 7–0. **Drive: 4 plays, 97 yards, 2:25.**
- ARI – Walter Nolen 7-yard fumble return (Chad Ryland kick), 2:26. Tied 7–7.

**Second quarter**

- JAX – Cam Little 52-yard field goal, 12:55. Jaguars 10–7. **Drive: 10 plays, 31 yards, 4:31.**
- ARI – Bam Knight 1-yard run (Chad Ryland kick), 7:31. Cardinals 14–10. **Drive: 9 plays, 65 yards, 5:24.**

**Third quarter**

- JAX – Jakobi Meyers 10-yard pass from Trevor Lawrence (Cam Little kick), 8:10. Jaguars 17–14. **Drive: 6 plays, 27 yards, 2:45.**

**Fourth quarter**

- ARI – Greg Dortch 39-yard pass from Jacoby Brissett (Chad Ryland kick), 7:12. Cardinals 21–17. **Drive: 3 plays, 41 yards, 1:27.**
- JAX – Parker Washington 9-yard pass from Trevor Lawrence (Cam Little kick), 3:47. Jaguars 24–21. **Drive: 6 plays, 65 yards, 3:25.**
- ARI – Chad Ryland 29-yard field goal, 0:03. Tied 24–24. **Drive: 8 plays, 69 yards, 1:35.**

**Overtime**

- JAX – Cam Little 52-yard field goal, 7:46. Jaguars 27–24. **Drive: 5 plays, 31 yards, 2:14.**

**Top passers**

- JAX – Trevor Lawrence – 18/30, 256 yards, 3 TD, 3 INT
- ARI – Jacoby Brissett – 33/49, 317 yards, TD

**Top rushers**

- JAX – Travis Etienne – 15 rushes, 86 yards
- ARI – Michael Carter – 5 rushes, 28 yards

**Top receivers**

- JAX – Brenton Strange – 5 receptions, 93 yards
- ARI – Michael Wilson – 10 receptions, 118 yards

The Cardinals lost a close game in overtime 27–24. Despite intercepting Trevor Lawrence 3 times and recording 4 turnovers the Cardinals still lost. This marked their first loss to Jacksonville since 2005, snapping a 4 game win streak. The Cardinals scored their first points on a Walter Nolen III 7 yard fumble return. Bam Knight scored on a 1-yard rush in the second quarter. Greg Dortch caught a 39-yard pass from Jacoby Brissett in the fourth quarter. The Cardinals recorded 3 interceptions; one each by Akeem Davis, Garrett Williams, and Budda Baker. Brissett completed 33 of 49 passes for 317 yards and a touchdown and a passer rating of 92.0.

==== Week 13: at Tampa Bay Buccaneers ====
Week 13: Arizona Cardinals at Tampa Bay Buccaneers – Game summary

Quarter	1	2	3	4	Total
Cardinals	0	3	7	7	**17**
**Buccaneers**	0	10	7	3	**20**

at Raymond James Stadium, Tampa, Florida

- Date: November 30
- Game time: 1:00 p.m. EST/11:00 a.m. MST
- Game weather: Clear, 80 °F (27 °C)
- Game attendance: 61,103
- Referee: Bill Vinovich
- TV announcers (Fox): Kevin Kugler, Daryl Johnston and Allison Williams
- Recap, Game Book

Game information

**First quarter**

- No scoring plays

**Second quarter**

- TB – Chase McLaughlin 25-yard field goal, 8:02. Buccaneers 3–0. **Drive: 10 plays, 63 yards, 5:13.**
- TB – Tristan Wirfs 2-yard pass from Baker Mayfield (Chase McLaughlin kick), 1:36. Buccaneers 10–0. **Drive: 10 plays, 50 yards, 4:34.**
- ARI – Chad Ryland 52-yard field goal, 0:00. Buccaneers 10–3. **Drive: 8 plays, 43 yards, 1:36.**

**Third quarter**

- TB – Bucky Irving 13-yard run (Chase McLaughlin kick), 3:56. Buccaneers 17–3. **Drive: 7 plays, 67 yards, 3:50.**
- ARI – Bam Knight 15-yard pass from Jacoby Brissett (Chad Ryland kick), 0:31. Buccaneers 17–10. **Drive: 6 plays, 72 yards, 3:25.**

**Fourth quarter**

- TB – Chase McLaughlin 57-yard field goal, 8:58. Buccaneers 20–10. **Drive: 4 plays, 0 yards, 1:41.**
- ARI – Trey McBride 15-yard pass from Jacoby Brissett (Chad Ryland kick), 4:58. Buccaneers 20–17. **Drive: 9 plays, 73 yards, 4:00.**

**Top passers**

- ARI – Jacoby Brissett – 29/40, 301 yards, 2 TD
- TB – Baker Mayfield – 18/28, 194 yards, TD

**Top rushers**

- ARI – Bam Knight – 11 rushes, 62 yards
- TB – Bucky Irving – 17 rushes, 61 yards, TD

**Top receivers**

- ARI – Trey McBride – 8 receptions, 82 yards, TD
- TB – Chris Godwin – 3 receptions, 78 yards

With their 9th loss in their last 10 games, the Cardinals fell to 3–9 (2–1 against the NFC South) and they were eliminated from playoff contention for the fourth straight season. A few days later Kyler Murray would be ruled out for the rest of the season.

==== Week 14: vs. Los Angeles Rams ====
Week 14: Los Angeles Rams at Arizona Cardinals – Game summary

Quarter	1	2	3	4	Total
**Rams**	10	14	14	7	**45**
Cardinals	7	3	0	7	**17**

at State Farm Stadium, Glendale, Arizona

- Date: December 7
- Game time: 2:25 p.m. MST
- Game weather: Sunny, 68 °F (20 °C) (retractable roof open)
- Game attendance: 61,970
- Referee: Ron Torbert
- TV announcers (Fox): Kenny Albert, Jonathan Vilma and Megan Olivi
- Recap, Game Book

Game information

**First quarter**

- ARI – Michael Wilson 19-yard pass from Jacoby Brissett (Chad Ryland kick), 12:05. Cardinals 7–0. **Drive: 5 plays, 67 yards, 2:55.**
- LAR – Harrison Mevis 26-yard field goal, 7:40. Cardinals 7–3. **Drive: 10 plays, 60 yards, 4:25.**
- LAR – Blake Corum 2-yard run (Harrison Mevis kick), 1:29. Rams 10–7. **Drive: 6 plays, 74 yards, 3:26.**

**Second quarter**

- ARI – Chad Ryland 38-yard field goal, 8:34. Tied 10–10. **Drive: 13 plays, 62 yards, 7:55.**
- LAR – Kyren Williams 2-yard run (Harrison Mevis kick), 2:47. Rams 17–10. **Drive: 10 plays, 65 yards, 5:47.**
- LAR – Puka Nacua 28-yard pass from Matthew Stafford (Harrison Mevis kick), 0:12. Rams 24–10. **Drive: 7 plays, 92 yards, 1:30.**

**Third quarter**

- LAR – Colby Parkinson 6-yard pass from Matthew Stafford (Harrison Mevis kick), 10:09. Rams 31–10. **Drive: 10 plays, 74 yards, 4:51.**
- LAR – Puka Nacua 31-yard pass from Matthew Stafford (Harrison Mevis kick), 0:12. Rams 38–10. **Drive: 1 play, 31 yards, 0:06.**

**Fourth quarter**

- LAR – Blake Corum 48-yard run (Harrison Mevis kick), 13:46. Rams 45–10. **Drive: 1 play, 48 yards, 0:10.**
- ARI – Michael Wilson 14-yard pass from Jacoby Brissett (Chad Ryland kick), 11:08. Rams 45–17. **Drive: 10 plays, 65 yards, 2:38.**

**Top passers**

- LAR – Matthew Stafford – 22/31, 281 yards, 3 TD
- ARI – Jacoby Brissett – 25/44, 271 yards, 2 TD, INT

**Top rushers**

- LAR – Blake Corum – 12 rushes, 128 yards, 2 TD
- ARI – Jacoby Brissett – 4 rushes, 22 yards

**Top receivers**

- LAR – Puka Nacua – 7 receptions, 167 yards, 2 TD
- ARI – Michael Wilson – 11 receptions, 142 yards, 2 TD

With their fifth straight loss, the Cardinals fell to 3–10 and 0–5 against the NFC West.

==== Week 15: at Houston Texans ====
Week 15: Arizona Cardinals at Houston Texans – Game summary

Quarter	1	2	3	4	Total
Cardinals	0	7	7	6	**20**
**Texans**	17	6	7	10	**40**

at NRG Stadium, Houston, Texas

- Date: December 14
- Game time: 12:00 p.m. CST/11:00 a.m. MST
- Game weather: None (retractable roof closed)
- Game attendance: 71,086
- Referee: Clete Blakeman
- TV announcers (Fox): Chris Myers, Mark Schlereth and Jen Hale
- Recap, Game Book

Game information

**First quarter**

- HOU – Nico Collins 57-yard pass from C. J. Stroud (Kaʻimi Fairbairn kick), 14:11. Texans 7–0. **Drive: 2 plays, 59 yards, 0:49.**
- HOU – Kaʻimi Fairbairn 30-yard field goal, 12:00. Texans 10–0. **Drive: 5 plays, 10 yards, 2:03.**
- HOU – Woody Marks 1-yard fumble return (Kaʻimi Fairbairn kick), 6:12. Texans 17–0.

**Second quarter**

- ARI – Trey McBride 2-yard pass from Jacoby Brissett (Chad Ryland kick), 13:41. Texans 17–7. **Drive: 13 plays, 71 yards, 7:31.**
- HOU – Kaʻimi Fairbairn 55-yard field goal, 9:01. Texans 20–7. **Drive: 7 plays, 28 yards, 4:40.**
- HOU – Kaʻimi Fairbairn 22-yard field goal, 1:44. Texans 23–7. **Drive: 12 plays, 76 yards, 5:44.**

**Third quarter**

- HOU – Dalton Schultz 4-yard pass from C. J. Stroud (Kaʻimi Fairbairn kick), 4:35. Texans 30–7. **Drive: 8 plays, 80 yards, 4:20.**
- ARI – Trey McBride 20-yard pass from Jacoby Brissett (Chad Ryland kick), 0:33. Texans 30–14. **Drive: 8 plays, 71 yards, 4:02.**

**Fourth quarter**

- HOU – Kaʻimi Fairbairn 33-yard field goal, 13:34. Texans 33–14. **Drive: 5 plays, 11 yards, 1:59.**
- ARI – Michael Wilson 11-yard pass from Jacoby Brissett (pass failed), 11:01. Texans 33–20. **Drive: 8 plays, 73 yards, 2:33.**
- HOU – Nico Collins 4-yard pass from C. J. Stroud (Kaʻimi Fairbairn kick), 3:09. Texans 40–20. **Drive: 10 plays, 55 yards, 4:26.**

**Top passers**

- ARI – Jacoby Brissett – 27/40, 249 yards, 3 TD, INT
- HOU – C. J. Stroud – 22/29, 260 yards, 3 TD

**Top rushers**

- ARI – Michael Carter – 14 rushes, 56 yards
- HOU – Jawhar Jordan – 15 rushes, 101 yards

**Top receivers**

- ARI – Trey McBride – 12 receptions, 134 yards, 2 TD
- HOU – Nico Collins – 3 receptions, 85 yards, 2 TD

With their sixth straight loss, the Cardinals fell to 3–11 and became the only NFC West team to get swept by the AFC South.

==== Week 16: vs. Atlanta Falcons ====
Week 16: Atlanta Falcons at Arizona Cardinals – Game summary

Quarter	1	2	3	4	Total
**Falcons**	3	13	3	7	**26**
Cardinals	10	6	0	3	**19**

at State Farm Stadium, Glendale, Arizona

- Date: December 21
- Game time: 2:05 p.m. MST
- Game weather: Sunny, 76 °F (24 °C) (retractable roof open)
- Game attendance: 60,673
- Referee: Land Clark
- TV announcers (Fox): Jason Benetti, Brady Quinn and Sarah Kustok
- Recap, Game Book

Game information

**First quarter**

- ARI – Chad Ryland 50-yard field goal, 12:46. Cardinals 3–0. **Drive: 7 plays, 29 yards, 2:14.**
- ARI – Michael Wilson 32-yard pass from Jacoby Brissett (Chad Ryland kick), 7:43. Cardinals 10–0. **Drive: 5 plays, 55 yards, 2:10.**
- ATL – Zane Gonzalez 49-yard field goal, 2:17. Cardinals 10–3. **Drive: 11 plays, 34 yards, 5:26.**

**Second quarter**

- ARI – Chad Ryland 51-yard field goal, 13:27. Cardinals 13–3. **Drive: 8 plays, 42 yards, 3:50.**
- ATL – Bijan Robinson 13-yard pass from Kirk Cousins (Zane Gonzalez kick), 11:56. Cardinals 13–10. **Drive: 3 plays, 65 yards, 1:31.**
- ARI – Chad Ryland 25-yard field goal, 5:02. Cardinals 16–10. **Drive: 13 plays, 59 yards, 6:54.**
- ATL – Kyle Pitts 5-yard pass from Kirk Cousins (kick failed), 0:25. Tied 16–16. **Drive: 14 plays, 60 yards, 4:37.**

**Third quarter**

- ATL – Zane Gonzalez 40-yard field goal, 7:25. Falcons 19–16. **Drive: 13 plays, 44 yards, 7:35.**

**Fourth quarter**

- ATL – Kirk Cousins 1-yard run (Zane Gonzalez kick), 12:28. Falcons 26–16. **Drive: 12 plays, 66 yards, 6:14.**
- ARI – Chad Ryland 34-yard field goal, 4:37. Falcons 26–19. **Drive: 10 plays, 37 yards, 2:43.**

**Top passers**

- ATL – Kirk Cousins – 21/35, 197 yards, 2 TD, INT
- ARI – Jacoby Brissett – 16/31, 203 yards, TD, INT

**Top rushers**

- ATL – Tyler Allgeier – 16 rushes, 79 yards
- ARI – Michael Carter – 11 rushes, 65 yards

**Top receivers**

- ATL – Bijan Robinson – 7 receptions, 92 yards, TD
- ARI – Elijah Higgins – 7 receptions, 91 yards

With their seventh straight loss, the Cardinals fell to 3–12, finished 2–2 against the NFC South and 2–6 against both southern divisions. Arizona finished 1–7 at home.

==== Week 17: at Cincinnati Bengals ====
Week 17: Arizona Cardinals at Cincinnati Bengals – Game summary

Quarter	1	2	3	4	Total
Cardinals	0	7	0	7	**14**
**Bengals**	7	16	14	0	**37**

at Paycor Stadium, Cincinnati, Ohio

- Date: December 28
- Game time: 1:00 p.m. EST/11:00 a.m. MST
- Game weather: Overcast, 65 °F (18 °C)
- Game attendance: 61,402
- Referee: Clay Martin
- TV announcers (Fox): Kevin Kugler, Daryl Johnston and Allison Williams
- Recap, Game Book

Game information

**First quarter**

- CIN – Ja'Marr Chase 13-yard pass from Joe Burrow (Evan McPherson kick), 9:17. Bengals 7–0. **Drive: 12 plays, 72 yards, 5:43.**

**Second quarter**

- CIN – Samaje Perine 1-yard run (kick failed), 14:58. Bengals 13–0. **Drive: 12 plays, 79 yards, 7:50.**
- ARI – Michael Wilson 38-yard pass from Jacoby Brissett (Chad Ryland kick), 11:44. Bengals 13–7. **Drive: 5 plays, 70 yards, 3:14.**
- CIN – Evan McPherson 57-yard field goal, 3:21. Bengals 16–7. **Drive: 10 plays, 60 yards, 5:48.**
- CIN – Ja'Marr Chase 8-yard pass from Joe Burrow (Evan McPherson kick), 1:15. Bengals 23–7. **Drive: 3 plays, 36 yards, 1:06.**

**Third quarter**

- CIN – Chase Brown 6-yard run (Evan McPherson kick), 7:33. Bengals 30–7. **Drive: 11 plays, 84 yards, 6:24.**
- CIN – Chase Brown 1-yard run (Evan McPherson kick), 1:38. Bengals 37–7. **Drive: 10 plays, 82 yards, 4:45.**

**Fourth quarter**

- ARI – Trey McBride 18-yard pass from Jacoby Brissett (Chad Ryland kick), 1:50. Bengals 37–14. **Drive: 16 plays, 92 yards, 4:30.**

**Top passers**

- ARI – Jacoby Brissett – 21/37, 212 yards, 2 TD
- CIN – Joe Burrow – 24/31, 305 yards, 2 TD

**Top rushers**

- ARI – Michael Carter – 7 rushes, 29 yards
- CIN – Chase Brown – 22 rushes, 101 yards, 2 TD

**Top receivers**

- ARI – Michael Wilson – 5 receptions, 89 yards, TD
- CIN – Ja'Marr Chase – 7 receptions, 60 yards, 2 TD

With the loss, the Cardinals fell to 3–13 and finished 0–5 against the AFC.

Tight end Trey McBride recorded 10 receptions, giving him 119 on the season and breaking the NFL single-season receptions record for a tight end. He surpassed the previous mark of 116 set by Zach Ertz in 2018.

==== Week 18: at Los Angeles Rams ====
Week 18: Arizona Cardinals at Los Angeles Rams – Game summary

Quarter	1	2	3	4	Total
Cardinals	3	3	14	0	**20**
**Rams**	3	13	7	14	**37**

at SoFi Stadium, Inglewood, California

- Date: January 4
- Game time: 2:25 p.m. MST/1:25 p.m. PST
- Game weather: Cloudy, 61 °F (16 °C) (fixed roof)
- Game attendance: 72,004
- Referee: Carl Cheffers
- TV announcers (Fox): Kenny Albert, Jonathan Vilma and Megan Olivi
- Recap, Game Book

Game information

**First quarter**

- LAR – Harrison Mevis 34-yard field goal, 11:07. Rams 3–0. **Drive: 4 plays, 7 yards, 1:53.**
- ARI – Chad Ryland 45-yard field goal, 3:26. Tied 3–3. **Drive: 13 plays, 56 yards, 7:41.**

**Second quarter**

- LAR – Harrison Mevis 42-yard field goal, 11:45. Rams 6–3. **Drive: 13 plays, 49 yards, 6:41.**
- ARI – Chad Ryland 56-yard field goal, 9:35. Tied 6–6. **Drive: 6 plays, 27 yards, 2:10.**
- LAR – Puka Nacua 2-yard pass from Matthew Stafford (Harrison Mevis kick), 1:22. Rams 13–6. **Drive: 18 plays, 74 yards, 8:13.**
- LAR – Harrison Mevis 40-yard field goal, 0:00. Rams 16–6. **Drive: 7 plays, 47 yards, 0:49.**

**Third quarter**

- ARI – Michael Wilson 43-yard pass from Jacoby Brissett (Chad Ryland kick), 10:38. Rams 16–13. **Drive: 5 plays, 73 yards, 3:03.**
- ARI – Josiah Deguara 7-yard pass from Jacoby Brissett (Chad Ryland kick), 3:51. Cardinals 20–16. **Drive: 10 plays, 76 yards, 6:17.**
- LAR – Colby Parkinson 21-yard pass from Matthew Stafford (Harrison Mevis kick), 0:42. Rams 23–20. **Drive: 6 plays, 70 yards, 3:09.**

**Fourth quarter**

- LAR – Tyler Higbee 22-yard pass from Matthew Stafford (Harrison Mevis kick), 10:39. Rams 30–20. **Drive: 6 plays, 66 yards, 2:53.**
- LAR – Colby Parkinson 1-yard pass from Matthew Stafford (Harrison Mevis kick), 4:15. Rams 37–20. **Drive: 12 plays, 81 yards, 4:57.**

**Top passers**

- ARI – Jacoby Brissett – 22/31, 243 yards, 2 TD, INT
- LAR – Matthew Stafford – 25/40, 259 yards, 4 TD

**Top rushers**

- ARI – Emari Demercado – 2 rushes, 29 yards
- LAR – Kyren Williams – 12 rushes, 60 yards

**Top receivers**

- ARI – Michael Wilson – 5 receptions, 99 yards, TD
- LAR – Tyler Higbee – 5 receptions, 91 yards, TD

With the loss, the Cardinals finished dead last in the NFC with a Super Bowl era-franchise worst 3–14 record (2–7 on the road). Additionally, the Cardinals were swept by all three of their NFC West division rivals (for 0–6 division record) for the second time in three seasons.

The following day, the Cardinals fired head coach Jonathan Gannon. During his three-year tenure, Gannon compiled a 15–36 record.

=== Standings ===
==== Division ====
NFC West
	W	L	T	PCT	DIV	CONF	PF	PA	STK
^{(1)} Seattle Seahawks	14	3	0	.824	4–2	9–3	483	292	W7
^{(5)} Los Angeles Rams	12	5	0	.706	4–2	7–5	518	346	W1
^{(6)} San Francisco 49ers	12	5	0	.706	4–2	9–3	437	371	L1
Arizona Cardinals	3	14	0	.176	0–6	3–9	355	488	L9

==== Conference ====
NFC
Seed	Team	Division	W	L	T	PCT	DIV	CONF	SOS	SOV	STK
**Division leaders**
1	Seattle Seahawks	West	14	3	0	.824	4–2	9–3	.498	.471	W7
2 (Note: Chicago finished ahead of Philadelphia based on head-to-head victory.)	Chicago Bears	North	11	6	0	.647	2–4	7–5	.458	.406	L2
3	Philadelphia Eagles	East	11	6	0	.647	3–3	8–4	.476	.455	L1
4 (Note: Carolina finished ahead of Tampa Bay and Atlanta based on head-to-head record (Carolina 3–1 to Tampa Bay 2–2 and Atlanta 1–3).)	Carolina Panthers	South	8	9	0	.471	3–3	6–6	.522	.463	L2
**Wild cards**
5 (Note: LA Rams finished ahead of San Francisco based on common games (LA Rams 9–3 to San Francisco 8–4 against: Arizona, Atlanta, Carolina, Houston, Indianapolis, Jacksonville, New Orleans, Seattle, Tampa Bay and Tennessee).)	Los Angeles Rams	West	12	5	0	.706	4–2	7–5	.526	.485	W1
6	San Francisco 49ers	West	12	5	0	.706	4–2	9–3	.498	.417	L1
7	Green Bay Packers	North	9	7	1	.559	4–2	7–4–1	.483	.431	L4
**Did not qualify for the postseason**
8 (Note: Minnesota finished ahead of Detroit based on head-to-head sweep.)	Minnesota Vikings	North	9	8	0	.529	4–2	7–5	.514	.431	W5
9	Detroit Lions	North	9	8	0	.529	2–4	6–6	.490	.428	W1
10 (Note: Tampa Bay finished ahead of Atlanta based on common games (Tampa Bay 6–6 to Atlanta 5–7 against: Arizona, Buffalo, Carolina, LA Rams, Miami, New England, New Orleans, NY Jets, San Francisco and Seattle).)	Tampa Bay Buccaneers	South	8	9	0	.471	3–3	6–6	.529	.485	W1
11	Atlanta Falcons	South	8	9	0	.471	3–3	7–5	.495	.449	W4
12	Dallas Cowboys	East	7	9	1	.441	4–2	4–7–1	.438	.311	L1
13	New Orleans Saints	South	6	11	0	.353	3–3	4–8	.495	.333	L1
14	Washington Commanders	East	5	12	0	.294	3–3	3–9	.507	.388	W1
15	New York Giants	East	4	13	0	.235	2–4	2–10	.524	.478	W2
16	Arizona Cardinals	West	3	14	0	.176	0–6	3–9	.571	.422	L9
**Tiebreakers** (Note: When breaking ties for three or more teams under the NFL's rules, they are first broken within divisions, then comparing only the highest ranked remaining team from each division.)

== Statistics ==
=== Starters ===
Offense

Pos.	Name	GS
QB	Jacoby Brissett; Kyler Murray	12; 5
RB	James Conner; Zonovan Knight; Michael Carter	3; 8; 5
WR	Marvin Harrison Jr; Michael Wilson; Greg Dortch; Xavier Weaver; Andre Baccellia	10; 13; 3; 2; 2
TE	Trey McBride; Elijah Higgins; Tip Reiman; Pharaoh Brown; Josiah Deguara; Travis Vokolek	17; 10; 3; 2; 2; 1
LT	Paris Johnson; Josh Fryar; Kelvin Beachum	12; 4; 1
LG	Evan Brown; Jon Gaines; Will Hernandez	11; 5; 1
C	Hjalte Froholdt	17
RG	Isaiah Adams; Will Hernandez	11; 6
RT	Jonah Williams; Kelvin Beachum	9; 8

Defense

Pos.	Name	GS
DE	Calais Campbell	17
DT	Dalvin Tomlinson	17
DE	Darius Robinson; Dante Stills	12; 3
OLB	Zaven Collins; Baron Browning	9; 7
ILB	Akeem Davis-Gaither	13
ILB	Cody Simon; Mack Wilson Sr	9; 8
OLB	Josh Sweat	17
CB	Max Melton; Will Johnson; Denzel Burke	8; 7; 2
CB	Garrett Williams; Denzel Burke; Will Johnson; Kei'Trel Clark	10; 4; 2; 1
S1	Budda Baker; Dadrion Taylor-Demerson	16; 1
S2	Jalen Thompson; Dadrion Taylor-Demerson	15; 2
Hybrid DB	Darren Hall; Dadrion Taylor-Demerson; Denzel Burke; Will Johnson; Kitan Crawford	3; 2; 2; 1; 1

Special Teams

Pos.	Name	GS
P	Blake Gillikin; Pat O'Donnell; Matt Haack	5; 5; 7
K	Chad Ryland	17
LS	Aaron Brewer	17

=== Individual leaders ===
Category	Player(s)	Value
Passing yards	Jacoby Brissett	3,366
Passing touchdowns	Jacoby Brissett	23
Rushing yards	Michael Carter	333
Rushing touchdowns	Zonovan Knight	4
Receptions	Trey McBride	126
Receiving yards	Trey McBride	1,239
Receiving touchdowns	Trey McBride	11
Kickoff return yards	Greg Dortch	811
Punt return yards	Greg Dortch	185
Tackles	Budda Baker	120
Sacks	Josh Sweat	12.0
Forced fumbles	Josh Sweat	4
Interceptions	Denzel Burke	3
Kicking - field goals	Chad Ryland	25/33, 75.8%
Kicking - extra points	Chad Ryland	36/36, 100%

=== Team rankings ===
Category	Value	NFL rank (out of 32)
Passing attempts	649	1st
Passing completions	427	
Passing yards	3,955	7th
Passing touchdowns	29	7th
Interceptions thrown	11	13th
Rushing attempts	366	32nd
Rushing yards	1,583	31st
Rushing touchdowns	9	27th
Rushing yards/attempt	4.3	16th
Total yards of offense	5,538	19th
Points scored	355	23rd
Points allowed	488	29th
Passing yards allowed	3,923	24th
Passing touchdowns allowed	31	26th
Rushing attempts against	489	26th
Rushing yards allowed	2,158	25th
Rushing touchdowns allowed	19	24th
Yards/rush attempt allowed	4.4	24th
Interceptions made	10	18th
Fumbles recovered	9	10th
Total yards allowed	6,081	27th

Statistical values are correct through January 4, 2026
