= Michael Wilson (wide receiver) =

American football player (born 2000)

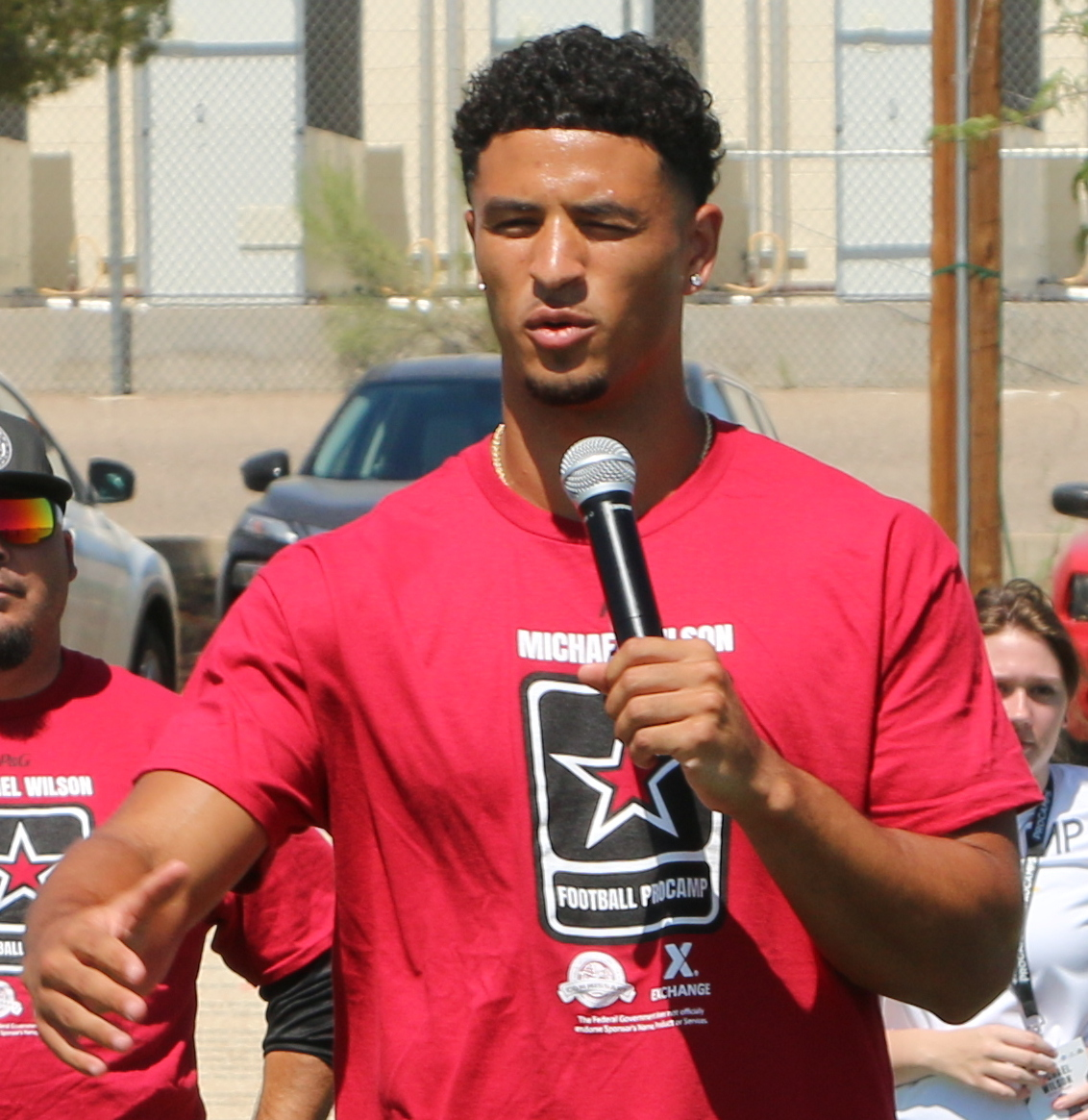
- Wilson in 2024

No. 14 – Arizona Cardinals
- Position: Wide receiver
- Roster status: Injured reserve

Personal information
- Born: February 23, 2000 (age 26); Los Angeles, California, U.S.
- Listed height: 6 ft 2 in (1.88 m)
- Listed weight: 213 lb (97 kg)

Career information
- High school: Chaminade College Prep (Los Angeles)
- College: Stanford (2018–2022)
- NFL draft: 2023: 3rd round, 94th overall pick

Career history
- Arizona Cardinals (2023–present)

Career NFL statistics as of Week 5, 2026
- Receptions: 188
- Receiving yards: 2,377
- Receiving average: 12.6
- Receiving touchdowns: 15
- Stats at Pro Football Reference

Michael George Wilson (born February 23, 2000) is an American professional football wide receiver for the Arizona Cardinals of the National Football League (NFL). He played college football for Stanford University.

== Early life ==
Wilson is the son of Orville and Ngaire Wilson. His father was born in Jamaica and his mother, Ngaire, was born in Wellington, New Zealand, and Wilson is the nephew of Maureen Jacobson, who played for the New Zealand women's national football team. Wilson grew up in Simi Valley, California and attended Chaminade College Preparatory School. As a junior, he caught 70 passes for 1,278 yards and 12 touchdowns. Wilson was rated a four-star recruit and committed to play college football at Stanford after considering Notre Dame.

== College career ==
Wilson played in all 13 of Stanford's games during his freshman season. He became a starter as a sophomore and led the Cardinal with 56 receptions and 672 receiving yards while scoring 5 touchdowns. Wilson caught 19 passes for 261 yards and one touchdown in the first four games of his junior season before suffering a foot injury. Wilson missed the beginning of his senior year due to the foot injury that he suffered in the previous season. He returned for the final four games and had 19 receptions for 185 yards. Wilson used the extra year of eligibility granted to college athletes in 2020 due to the COVID-19 pandemic and returned to Stanford for a fifth season. He caught 26 passes 418 yards and four touchdowns in six games before suffering a season-ending injury.

== Professional career ==
Pre-draft measurables
Height	Weight	Arm length	Hand span	Wingspan	40-yard dash	10-yard split	20-yard split	20-yard shuttle	Three-cone drill	Vertical jump	Broad jump	Bench press
6 ft 1 7/8 in (1.88 m)	213 lb (97 kg)	31 in (0.79 m)	9 3/4 in (0.25 m)	6 ft 3 1/8 in (1.91 m)	4.58 s	1.50 s	2.61 s	4.17 s	6.81 s	37.5 in (0.95 m)	10 ft 5 in (3.18 m)	23 reps
All values from NFL Combine/Pro Day

Despite not playing a full season of College Football due to injuries since 2019, Wilson was drafted by the Arizona Cardinals in the third round, 94th overall pick, of the 2023 NFL draft. In Week 4 of the 2023 season, he had two receiving touchdowns in a loss to the San Francisco 49ers. As a rookie, he had 38 receptions for 565 receiving yards and three touchdowns in 13 games and 12 starts.

Wilson entered the 2025 season as one of Arizona's primary wide receivers alongside Marvin Harrison Jr and Greg Dortch. In Week 11 against the San Francisco 49ers, with Harrison out due to injury, Wilson recorded a career-high 15 receptions for 185 receiving yards (also a career-high). Wilson recorded 1,000 yards receiving in 2025, becoming the first Cardinals receiver to do that since DeAndre Hopkins in 2020. Wilson and tight end Trey McBride each recorded more than 1,000 yards receiving, becoming the first Cardinals pair to do so since 2015.

On September 3, 2026, Wilson signed a three-year, $75 million contract extension with the Cardinals. In Week 9, Wilson suffered a neck fracture and was placed on season-ending injured reserve on November 10, 2026. He finished the season with 51 catches for 546 yards and two touchdowns in nine games.

== NFL career statistics ==
Legend
**Bold**	Career high

=== Regular season ===
Year	Team	Games		Receiving					Rushing					Fumbles	
Year	Team	GP	GS	Rec	Yds	Avg	Lng	TD	Att	Yds	Avg	Lng	TD	Fum	Lost
2023	ARI	13	12	38	565	**14.9**	**69**	3	0	0	0	0	0	0	0
2024	ARI	16	**13**	47	548	11.7	41	4	**1**	**7**	**7**	**7**	0	**1**	**1**
2025	ARI	**17**	**13**	**78**	**1,006**	12.9	50	**7**	0	0	0	0	0	0	0
Career		46	38	163	2,119	13.1	69	14	0	0	0	0	0	1	1

== Personal life ==
Wilson married professional soccer player Sophia Smith, whom he met when both attended Stanford, in January 2025. The two got engaged in June 2024. The couple welcomed a daughter name Gianna Capri Wilson in September 2025.
