= Chad Ryland =

American football player (born 1999)

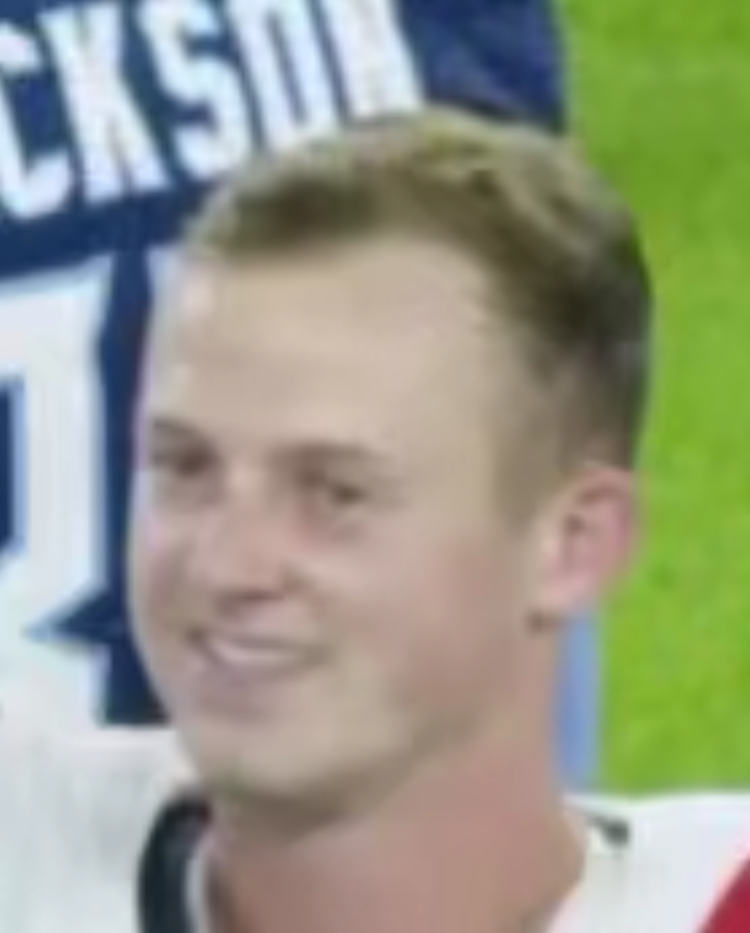
- Ryland with the New England Patriots in 2023

No. 38 – Arizona Cardinals
- Position: Placekicker
- Roster status: Active

Personal information
- Born: October 15, 1999 (age 27); Lebanon, Pennsylvania, U.S.
- Listed height: 6 ft 0 in (1.83 m)
- Listed weight: 195 lb (88 kg)

Career information
- High school: Cedar Crest (Lebanon)
- College: Eastern Michigan (2018–2021); Maryland (2022)
- NFL draft: 2023: 4th round, 112th overall pick

Career history
- New England Patriots (2023); Arizona Cardinals (2024–present)

Awards and highlights
- Second-team All-Big Ten (2022); 2× Second-team All-MAC (2020, 2021)

Career NFL statistics as of Week 10, 2026
- Field goals made: 91
- Field goals attempted: 114
- Field goal %: 79.8%
- Longest field goal: 60
- Points scored: 375
- Touchbacks: 122
- Stats at Pro Football Reference

Chad Michael Ryland (born October 15, 1999) is an American professional football placekicker for the Arizona Cardinals of the National Football League (NFL). He played college football for the Eastern Michigan Eagles and Maryland Terrapins.

== Early life ==
Ryland was born in Lebanon, Pennsylvania. He attended Cedar Crest High School but initially only played soccer and baseball. He was convinced to tryout for the football team as a junior by his father. He made the team and in both years was named an all-league and all-county selection at placekicker. To train, he and his father often snuck onto the school's athletic field after it was closed, and when they sometimes were told to leave, they briefly left, but then returned and Ryland continued practicing. He was ranked a five-star kicker and the 24th-best nationally at the position by Kohl's kicking camps.

== College career ==
Ryland was a walk-on at Eastern Michigan, and won the starting job as a true freshman. In his second game, he made the most memorable kick of his career: a game-winning 24-yard field goal as time expired to upset heavy favorite Purdue 20–19. Although he had a good performance to start the year, his play declined over the course of the season, and he finished having made only 12-of-20 field goal attempts, although Ryland did successfully convert all 41 PATs.

As a sophomore at Eastern Michigan in 2019, Ryland appeared in all 13 games and made 35 PATs, additionally making 14-of-19 field goal tries. Against Illinois, he converted a 24-yard game-winning field goal attempt in the final seconds. He was a second-team all-conference choice after the COVID-19-shortened 2020 season, in which he ranked top-20 nationally with a field goal percentage of 84.6, converting 11-of-13 attempts. The following year, Ryland set a team record with 104 points in a season after making 19-of-22 field goals and all 47 of his attempted PATs.

Ryland transferred to Maryland in 2022, finishing his stint at Eastern Michigan as their all-time leading scorer with 309 points. In his only season at Maryland, he appeared in every game and was named second-team all-conference after converting 19-of-23 field goal attempts, including being 3-for-6 on attempts of over 50 yards.

== Professional career ==
Pre-draft measurables
Height	Weight	Arm length	Hand span	Wingspan
5 ft 11 3/4 in (1.82 m)	190 lb (86 kg)	30 1/8 in (0.77 m)	9 3/8 in (0.24 m)	6 ft 1 1/8 in (1.86 m)
All values from the NFL Combine

=== New England Patriots ===
Ryland was selected by the New England Patriots in the fourth round (112th overall) of the 2023 NFL draft.

In Week 16 on Christmas Eve night, although having missed an earlier field goal attempt and a point after attempt against the Denver Broncos, Ryland made a 56 yard field goal with two seconds on the clock for a 26–23 win.

In total, Ryland made 16 of 25 field goal attempts (64%) and 24 of 25 extra point attempts (96%) in the 2023 NFL season; his field goal percentage was the lowest in the league among qualified kickers.

On August 27, 2024, Ryland was waived by the Patriots as part of the final roster cuts after losing the kicking job to Joey Slye.

=== Arizona Cardinals ===
On October 2, 2024, Ryland was signed to the Arizona Cardinals' practice squad. On October 15, he was signed to the active roster following an injury to Matt Prater. He was named NFC special teams player of the month in October after kicking three game-winning field goals and going 8–for–9 overall. During the Cardinals' December 8 game against the Seattle Seahawks, punter Blake Gillikin was injured so Ryland took over punting duties for the rest of the game.

On March 8, 2026, Ryland re-signed with the Cardinals on a one-year contract. In Week 6, Ryland went six-for-six on field goals, including a game-winning 43-yard field goal in an 18–16 upset victory over the Los Angeles Rams and was named NFC Special Teams Player of the Week for his performance.

== NFL career statistics ==
Legend
**Bold**	Career high

General			Field goals					PATs			Kickoffs			Points
Season	Team	GP	FGM	FGA	FG%	Blck	Long	XPM	XPA	XP%	KO	Avg	TBs	Pts
2023	NE	17	16	25	64.0	0	56	24	25	96.0	60	63.6	39	72
2024	ARI	13	**28**	32	**87.5**	**1**	58	26	27	96.3	67	**65.3**	**54**	110
2025	ARI	17	25	**33**	75.8	1	57	**36**	**36**	**100.0**	**82**	59.0	20	**111**
2026	ARI	10	22	24	91.7	0	**60**	16	17	94.1	45	60.0	9	82
Total		57	91	114	79.8	2	60	102	105	97.1	254	62.0	122	369
