= Garrett Williams =

American football player (born 2001)

No. 21 – Arizona Cardinals
- Position: Cornerback
- Roster status: Active

Personal information
- Born: June 1, 2001 (age 25); Charlotte, North Carolina, U.S.
- Listed height: 5 ft 10 in (1.78 m)
- Listed weight: 192 lb (87 kg)

Career information
- High school: Hickory Ridge (Harrisburg, North Carolina)
- College: Syracuse (2019–2022)
- NFL draft: 2023: 3rd round, 72nd overall pick

Career history
- Arizona Cardinals (2023–present)

Career NFL statistics as of 2025
- Total tackles: 127
- Forced fumbles: 2
- Pass deflections: 16
- Interceptions: 4
- Stats at Pro Football Reference

Garrett Alexander Williams (born June 1, 2001) is an American professional football cornerback for the Arizona Cardinals of the National Football League (NFL). He played college football for the Syracuse Orange.

== Early life ==
Williams grew up in Harrisburg, North Carolina, and attended Hickory Ridge High School. He was rated a three-star recruit and committed to play college football at Syracuse University.

== College career ==
Williams played in three games as a true freshman before redshirting the rest of the season. He became a starter going into his redshirt freshman season and was named honorable mention All-Atlantic Coast Conference (ACC) after making 64 tackles with a conference-leading 12 passes defended and two interceptions. He was also named to the Freshman All-American team by The Athletic. Williams again led the ACC with ten passes broken up and also had 52 tackles and five tackles for loss in 2021. Williams was elected captain in 2022 and made 36 tackles through seven games, had three total turnovers and one sack.

Over the four years, Williams played 32 games, made 152 tackles, and had four interceptions, one of which was a pick-6 on Trevor Lawrence, his only pick-six at Clemson.

== Professional career ==
Pre-draft measurables
| Height | Weight | Arm length | Hand span | Wingspan | Bench press |
|---|---|---|---|---|---|
| 5 ft 10 3/8 in (1.79 m) | 192 lb (87 kg) | 31 in (0.79 m) | 9 1/4 in (0.23 m) | 6 ft 2 1/2 in (1.89 m) | 19 reps |
All values from NFL Combine/Pro Day

The Arizona Cardinals selected Williams with the 72nd overall pick in the third round of the 2023 NFL draft. He began the 2023 season on the reserve/non-football injury list while he recovered from a torn ACL suffered in college. He was activated on October 21, 2023. As a rookie, he appeared in nine games and started six. He finished with 23 total tackles (19 solo), one interception and two passes defended. Williams made 16 appearances (11 starts) for Arizona during the 2024 season, compiling two interceptions, nine pass deflections, one forced fumble, and 58 combined tackles.

On September 17, 2025, Williams was placed on injured reserve due to a knee injury he suffered in the team's Week 2 victory over the Carolina Panthers. He was activated on November 3, ahead of the team's Week 9 matchup against the Arizona Cardinals. In 10 starts for the team, he recorded one interception, five pass deflections, one forced fumble, and 46 combined tackles. On December 22, Williams was placed on season-ending injured reserve due to an Achilles injury he suffered in Week 16 against the Atlanta Falcons. Two days later, he was diagnosed with a torn Achilles tendon.

== NFL career statistics ==
Legend
| **Bold** | Career high |

=== Regular season ===
| Year | Team | Games | | Tackles | | | | | Interceptions | | | | | | Fumbles | | | | |
| Year | Team | GP | GS | Cmb | Solo | Ast | Sck | TFL | Int | Yds | Avg | Lng | TD | PD | FF | Fmb | FR | Yds | TD |
|---|---|---|---|---|---|---|---|---|---|---|---|---|---|---|---|---|---|---|---|
| 2023 | ARI | 9 | 6 | 23 | 19 | 4 | 0.0 | 1 | 1 | 0 | 0.0 | 0 | 0 | 2 | 0 | 0 | 0 | 0 | 0 |
| 2024 | ARI | 16 | 11 | 58 | 40 | 18 | 0.0 | 0 | 2 | 0 | 0.0 | 0 | 0 | 9 | 1 | 0 | 0 | 0 | 0 |
| 2025 | ARI | 10 | 10 | 46 | 25 | 21 | 0.0 | 1 | 1 | 0 | 0.0 | 0 | 0 | 5 | 1 | 0 | 0 | 0 | 0 |
| Career | | 35 | 27 | 127 | 84 | 43 | 0.0 | 2 | 4 | 0 | 0.0 | 0 | 0 | 16 | 2 | 0 | 0 | 0 | 0 |
