= Cody Simon =

American football player (born 2002)

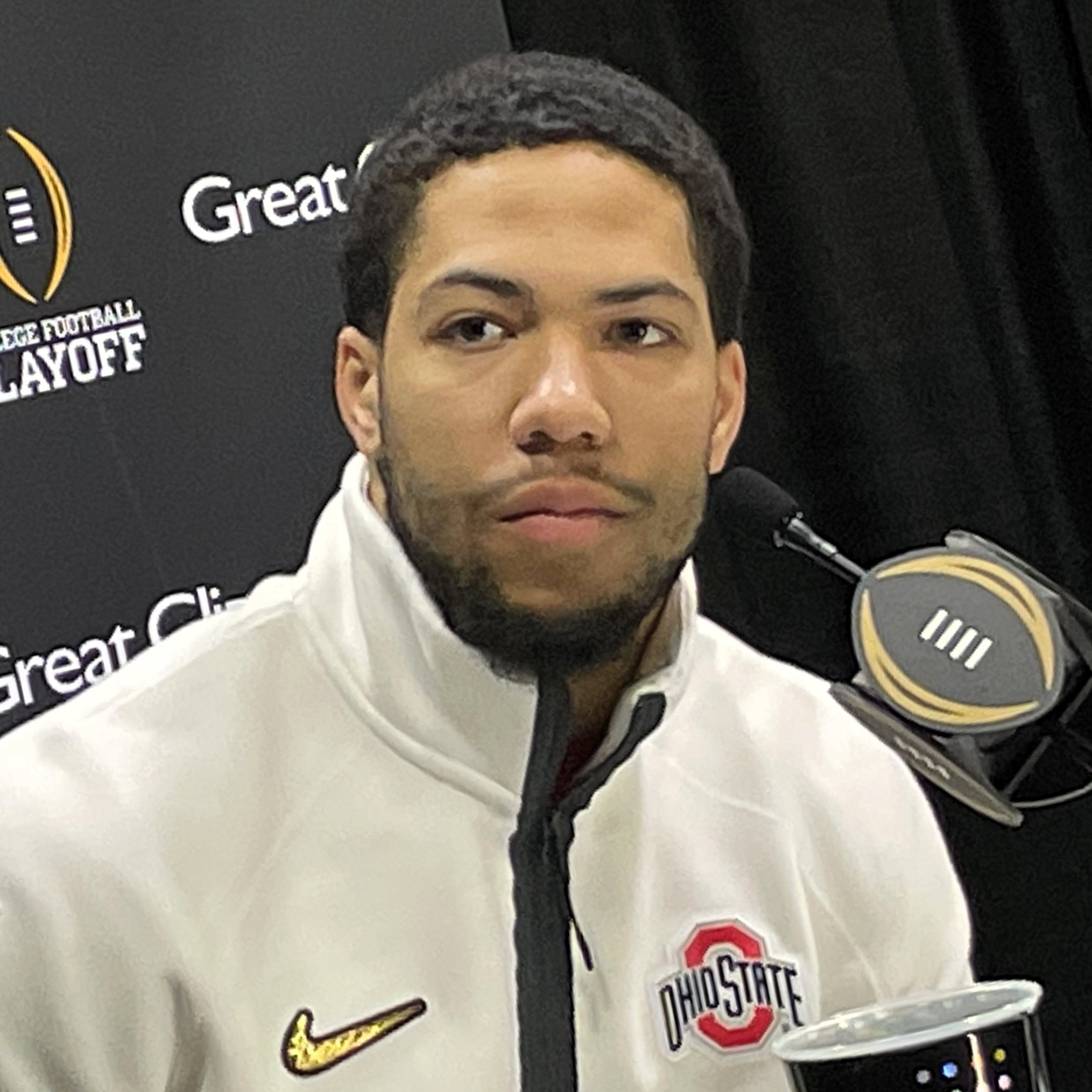
- Simon talking to press ahead of the 2025 CFP National Championship.

No. 0 – Arizona Cardinals
- Position: Inside linebacker
- Roster status: Active

Personal information
- Born: April 1, 2002 (age 24)
- Listed height: 6 ft 2 in (1.88 m)
- Listed weight: 230 lb (104 kg)

Career information
- High school: St. Peter's (Jersey City, New Jersey)
- College: Ohio State (2020–2024)
- NFL draft: 2025: 4th round, 115th overall pick

Career history
- Arizona Cardinals (2025–present)

Awards and highlights
- CFP national champion (2024); CFP National Championship Game Defensive MVP (2025); Rose Bowl Game Defensive MVP (2025); First-team All-Big Ten (2024)

Career NFL statistics as of Week 5, 2026
- Total tackles: 83
- Sacks: 0.5
- Pass deflections: 2
- Forced fumbles: 1
- Stats at Pro Football Reference

Cody Simon (born April 1, 2002) is an American professional football inside linebacker for the Arizona Cardinals of the National Football League (NFL). He played college football for the Ohio State Buckeyes and was selected by the Cardinals in the fourth round of the 2025 NFL draft.

== Early life ==
Simon attended St. Peter's Preparatory School in Jersey City, New Jersey. As a junior, he totaled 89 tackles with 13.5 being for a loss, 4.5 sacks, an interception, and two forced fumbles. Coming out of high school, Simon was ranked as the number four player in the state of New Jersey, and as the tenth best outside linebacker in the country. Simon committed to play college football at Ohio State University.

== College career ==
As a freshman in 2020 Simon primarily played on special teams where he racked up four tackles. In 2021, he recorded 54 tackles with 2.5 going for a loss, a sack, and an interception. In 2022, Simon totaled 32 tackles with 5.5 going for a loss, two sacks, a pass deflection, and a forced fumble. In week 4 of the 2023 season, Simon tallied two tackles, including a huge tackle on fourth down to stop quarterback Sam Hartman from getting a first down, as he helped the Buckeyes beat Notre Dame 17-14. In week 8, Simon notched a team-leading eight tackles in a win over Purdue.

In the 2024 season, Cody Simon served as a graduate student linebacker for the Ohio State Buckeyes, contributing significantly to the team's defense.

Simon was appointed as a team captain and honored with the "Block O" jersey, a recognition awarded to players exemplifying leadership, toughness, and character.

Throughout the season, Simon led the team with 112 total tackles, including 51 solo tackles and 61 assisted tackles . He also recorded 7 sacks, 13 tackles for loss, 7 pass breakups, and 1 forced fumble.

In the College Football Playoff, Simon's performance was notable. He registered 11 tackles, 2 sacks, and 3 tackles for loss in the Rose Bowl against Oregon . In the National Championship game against Notre Dame, Simon recorded 8 tackles and was named the defensive MVP of the game.

For his contributions during the season, Simon received several honors. He was named to the First Team All-Big Ten and was awarded the Big Ten Medal of Honor, recognizing his excellence in both athletics and academics.

Simon concluded his collegiate career with cumulative statistics of 121 solo tackles, 129 assisted tackles, 10 sacks, and 1 interception over five seasons.

== Professional career ==
Pre-draft measurables
Height	Weight	Arm length	Hand span	Wingspan	40-yard dash	10-yard split	20-yard split	20-yard shuttle	Three-cone drill	Vertical jump	Broad jump	Bench press
6 ft 1 7/8 in (1.88 m)	229 lb (104 kg)	31 1/4 in (0.79 m)	9 3/4 in (0.25 m)	6 ft 3 3/4 in (1.92 m)	4.59 s	1.54 s	2.59 s	4.30 s	7.19 s	33.5 in (0.85 m)	10 ft 0 in (3.05 m)	21 reps
All values from NFL Combine/Pro Day

Simon was selected by the Arizona Cardinals in the fourth round, 115th overall, of the 2025 NFL draft.

== NFL career statistics ==
=== Regular season ===
Year	Team	Games		Tackles					Interceptions						Fumbles				
Year	Team	GP	GS	Cmb	Solo	Ast	Sck	TFL	Int	Yds	Avg	Lng	TD	PD	FF	Fum	FR	Yds	TD
2025	ARI	16	9	76	30	46	0.5	2	0	0	0.0	0	0	2	1	0	0	0	0
2026	ARI	5	0	7	3	4	0.0	0	0	0	0.0	0	0	0	0	0	0	0	0
Career		21	9	83	33	50	0.5	2	0	0	0.0	0	0	2	1	0	0	0	0

== Personal life ==
Simon hails from an athletic family: his dad Mike played rugby at Army, his mom Amy ran track and field at the University of Michigan, and his brother Shayne is currently a linebacker for the DC Defenders.
