= Kitan Crawford =

American football player (born 2001)

No. 36 – Arizona Cardinals
- Position: Free safety
- Roster status: Active

Personal information
- Born: December 31, 2001 (age 24); Tyler, Texas, U.S.
- Listed height: 5 ft 11 in (1.80 m)
- Listed weight: 202 lb (92 kg)

Career information
- High school: Tyler
- College: Texas (2020–2023); Nevada (2024)
- NFL draft: 2025: 7th round, 225th overall pick

Career history
- Arizona Cardinals (2025–present)

Awards and highlights
- 2020 Alamo Bowl champion

Career NFL statistics as of 2025
- Total tackles: 20
- Pass deflections: 1
- Stats at Pro Football Reference

Kitan Crawford (born December 31, 2001) is an American professional football free safety for the Arizona Cardinals of the National Football League (NFL). He played college football for the Texas Longhorns and Nevada Wolf Pack and was selected by the Cardinals in the seventh round of the 2025 NFL draft.

== Early life ==
Crawford attended Tyler High School in Tyler, Texas. As a junior he totaled 30 tackles, 12 pass deflections, and two interceptions. As a senior, Crawford recorded 1,065 yards and 13 touchdowns. Coming out of high school, he was rated as a four-star recruit, the 24th player in the state of Texas, and the 159th overall prospect, and committed to play college football for the Texas Longhorns over offers from schools such as Arkansas, Baylor, Oklahoma, and Tennessee.

== College career ==
As a freshman at Texas in 2020, Crawford appeared in ten games, including the Alamo Bowl, where he tallied seven tackles with one being for a loss.

In 2021, he recorded just five tackles for Texas in 10 games.

In 2022, Crawford appeared in 13 games, including another appearance in the Alamo Bowl, with one start. He notched 25 tackles and a pass deflection for the Longhorns.

In 2023, he again appeared in 13 games, including the Big 12 Championship game and the College Football Playoff semifinals. In week 2 of the 2023 season, he tallied five tackles in an upset win over Alabama. In the 2023 Big 12 Championship Game, Crawford hauled in his first career interception in a win over Oklahoma State. He finished the 2023 season with 24 tackles with one being for a loss, two pass deflections, and an interception. After the season, Crawford entered his name into the NCAA transfer portal.

Crawford transferred to play for the Nevada Wolf Pack. As a senior he started in all 13 games for the Wolf Pack, where he recorded 76 tackles with three being for a loss, seven pass deflections, two interceptions, a forced fumble, a fumble recovery, and a touchdown.

After the 2024 season, Crawford declared for the 2025 NFL draft and participated in the 2025 Hula Bowl. He also accepted an invite to participate in the 2025 NFL Scouting Combine.

== Professional career ==
Pre-draft measurables
Height	Weight	Arm length	Hand span	Wingspan	40-yard dash	10-yard split	20-yard split	20-yard shuttle	Three-cone drill	Vertical jump	Broad jump	Bench press
5 ft 10 5/8 in (1.79 m)	202 lb (92 kg)	31 in (0.79 m)	9 1/2 in (0.24 m)	6 ft 3 1/4 in (1.91 m)	4.41 s	1.52 s	2.60 s	4.03 s	6.81 s	41.5 in (1.05 m)	10 ft 8 in (3.25 m)	18 reps
All values from NFL Combine

Crawford was selected by the Arizona Cardinals with the 225th pick in the seventh round of the 2025 NFL draft. He made the team's 53-man roster, and made his NFL debut on September 7, 2025. Crawford played in 15 games as a rookie, primarily on special teams and as a reserve safety on defense. On January 1, 2026, Crawford was placed on season-ending injured reserve due to an ankle injury suffered in Week 17 against the Cincinnati Bengals.

On September 16, 2026, Crawford was placed on injured reserve due to an ankle injury suffered in the team's season–opening victory over the Los Angeles Chargers.

== NFL career statistics ==
=== Regular season ===
Year	Team	Games		Tackles					Interceptions						Fumbles				
Year	Team	GP	GS	Cmb	Solo	Ast	Sck	TFL	Int	Yds	Avg	Lng	TD	PD	FF	Fum	FR	Yds	TD
2025	ARI	15	1	20	11	9	0.0	0	0	0	0.0	0	0	1	0	0	0	0	0
Career		15	1	20	11	9	0.0	0	0	0	0.0	0	0	1	0	0	0	0	0
