= Bam Knight =

American football player (born 2001)

Zonovan Knight
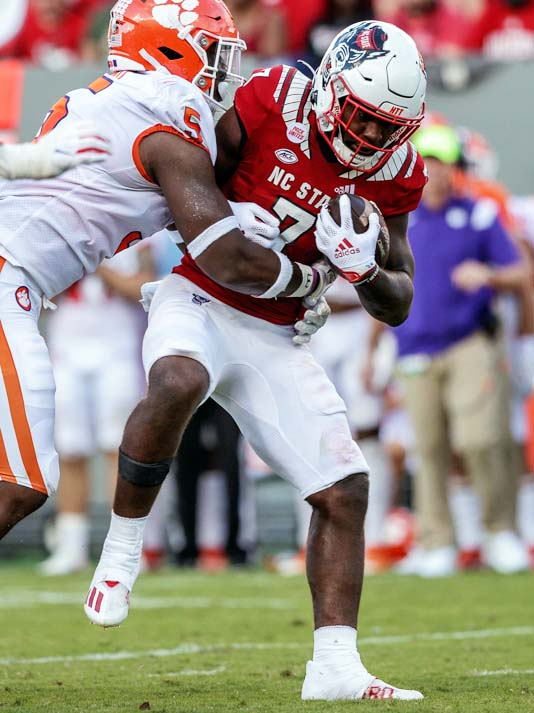
- Knight with the NC State Wolfpack in 2021

No. 20 – Arizona Cardinals
- Positions: Running back, kickoff returner
- Roster status: Active

Personal information
- Born: April 11, 2001 (age 25); Bailey, North Carolina, U.S.
- Listed height: 5 ft 11 in (1.80 m)
- Listed weight: 210 lb (95 kg)

Career information
- High school: Southern Nash (Bailey)
- College: NC State (2019–2021)
- NFL draft: 2022: undrafted

Career history
- New York Jets (2022); Detroit Lions (2023); New York Jets (2024)*; Arizona Cardinals (2025–present)
- * Offseason or practice squad member only

Awards and highlights
- First-team All-ACC (2021)

Career NFL statistics as of Week 10, 2026
- Rushing yards: 769
- Rushing average: 3.8
- Rushing touchdowns: 5
- Receptions: 42
- Receiving yards: 311
- Receiving touchdowns: 1
- Return yards: 296
- Stats at Pro Football Reference

Zonovan "Bam" Knight (born April 11, 2001) is an American professional football running back and kickoff returner for the Arizona Cardinals of the National Football League (NFL). He played college football for the NC State Wolfpack.

== Early life ==
Knight attended Southern Nash High School in Bailey, North Carolina. During his high school career, he had a school record 5,073 rushing yards and 71 touchdowns. He committed to North Carolina State University to play college football.

== College career ==
As a true freshman at NC State in 2019, Knight started seven games and led the team with 745 yards on 136 carries with five touchdowns. In 2020, he again led the team with 788 yards on 143 carries with 10 touchdowns. He returned to NC State as the starter in 2021.

== Professional career ==
Pre-draft measurables
Height	Weight	Arm length	Hand span	Wingspan	40-yard dash	10-yard split	20-yard split	20-yard shuttle	Three-cone drill	Vertical jump	Broad jump
5 ft 10 7/8 in (1.80 m)	209 lb (95 kg)	30 1/2 in (0.77 m)	9 1/4 in (0.23 m)	6 ft 1 1/2 in (1.87 m)	4.53 s	1.68 s	2.69 s	4.07 s	6.95 s	33.0 in (0.84 m)	9 ft 6 in (2.90 m)
All values from NFL Combine/Pro Day

=== New York Jets (first stint) ===
Knight signed with the New York Jets as an undrafted free agent on May 6, 2022. He made the Jets' initial 53-man roster on August 30. Knight was waived by New York on September 5. He was re-signed to the team's practice squad the next day. Knight was promoted to the active roster on October 25. Knight made his NFL debut on November 27 against the Chicago Bears, where he set a new franchise record with 103 yards from scrimmage in his debut, including 69 rushing yards.

Knight was waived by the Jets as part of final roster cuts on August 28, 2023.

=== Detroit Lions ===
On August 30, 2023, Knight was signed to the Detroit Lions' practice squad. On September 19, Knight was signed to the active roster. He was placed on injured reserve on October 14.

On August 27, 2024, Knight was released by the Lions.

=== New York Jets (second stint) ===
On November 26, 2024, Knight was signed to the New York Jets' practice squad.

=== Arizona Cardinals ===
On January 7, 2025, Knight signed a reserve/future contract with the Arizona Cardinals. On August 26, he made the Cardinals' initial 53-man roster as a kick returner. Following injuries to James Conner, Trey Benson, and Emari Demercado, Knight stepped in as the number one running back on the team. On December 16, Knight was placed on injured reserve due to a season-ending ankle injury suffered in Week 15 against the Houston Texans. He finished the season with 269 rushing yards and four touchdowns through 12 games and eight starts.

On March 12, 2026, Knight re-signed with the Cardinals on a one-year contract.

== NFL career statistics ==
Legend
**Bold**	Career high

=== Regular season ===
Year	Team	Games		Rushing					Receiving					Fumbles	
Year	Team	GP	GS	Att	Yds	Avg	Lng	TD	Rec	Yds	Avg	Lng	TD	Fum	Lost
2022	NYJ	7	4	**85**	**300**	3.5	**48**	1	13	100	7.7	16	0	**2**	**1**
2023	DET	2	0	3	13	**4.3**	8	0	1	8	**8.0**	8	0	0	0
2025	ARI	12	8	82	269	3.3	17	**4**	**22**	**160**	7.3	**20**	**1**	1	**1**
2026	ARI	9	0	33	187	5.7	31	0	6	43	7.2	10	0	2	0
Career		29	12	198	750	3.8	48	5	42	311	7.4	20	1	5	2

=== Special teams ===
Year	Team	Games		Punt returns					Kick returns				
Year	Team	GP	GS	Ret	Yds	Avg	Lng	TD	Ret	Yds	Avg	Lng	TD
2022	NYJ	7	4	0	0	0	0	0	1	18	18.0	18	0
2023	DET	2	0	0	0	0	0	0	1	22	**22.0**	22	0
2025	ARI	12	8	0	0	0	0	0	**12**	**256**	21.3	**28**	0
Career		21	12	0	0	0	0	0	14	296	21.1	28	0
