= Jonah Williams =

Jonah Williams may refer to:

- Jonah Williams (defensive lineman) (born 1995), American football player
- Jonah Williams (offensive lineman) (born 1997), American football player
- Jonah Williams (safety) (born 2007), American football player
