= Marvin Harrison Jr. =

American football player (born 2002)

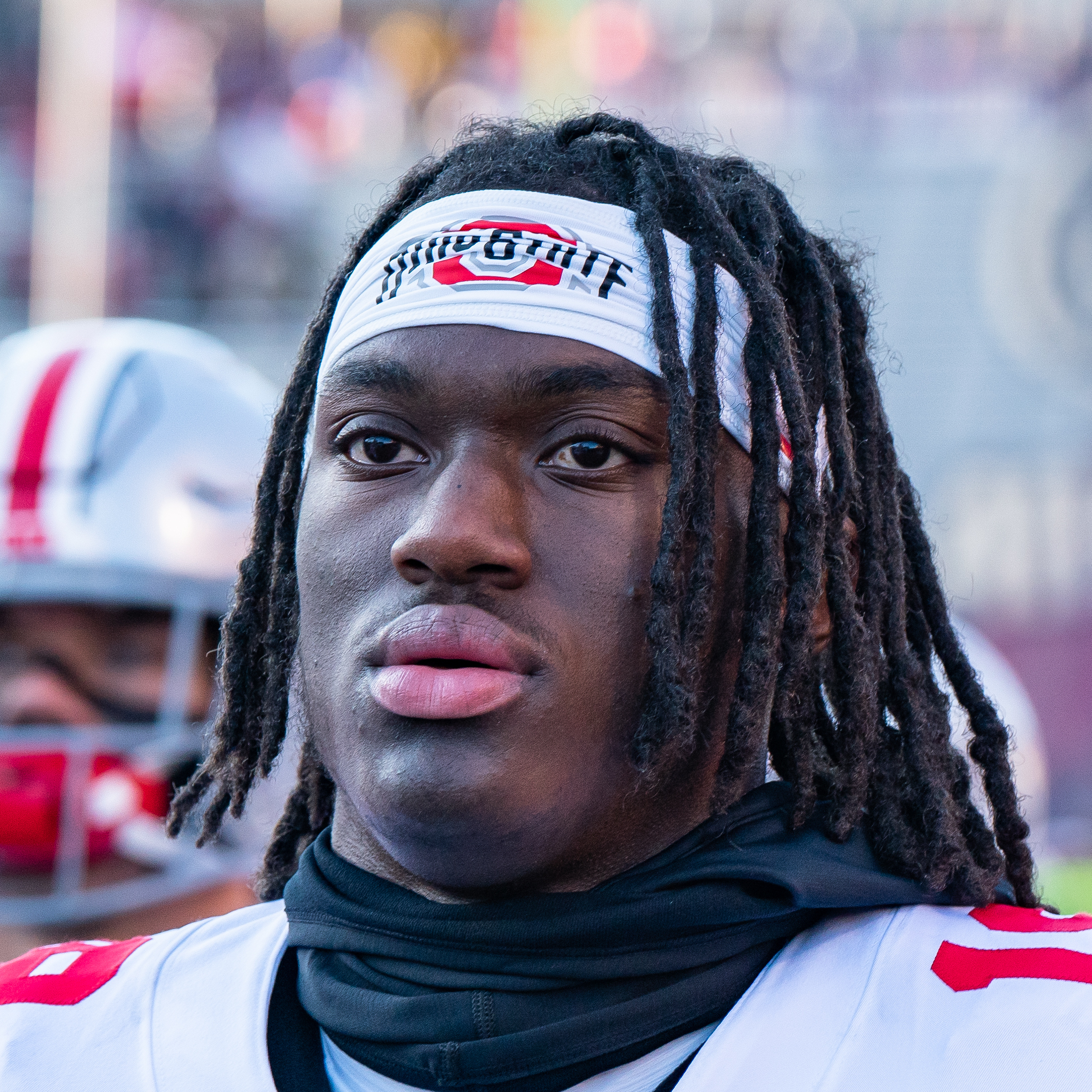
- Harrison with the Ohio State Buckeyes in 2022

No. 18 – Houston Texans
- Position: Wide receiver
- Roster status: Active

Personal information
- Born: August 11, 2002 (age 24); Philadelphia, Pennsylvania, U.S.
- Listed height: 6 ft 3 in (1.91 m)
- Listed weight: 220 lb (100 kg)

Career information
- High school: St. Joseph's Preparatory (Philadelphia)
- College: Ohio State (2021–2023)
- NFL draft: 2024: 1st round, 4th overall pick

Career history
- Arizona Cardinals (2024–2026); Houston Texans (2026–present)

Awards and highlights
- Fred Biletnikoff Award (2023); 2× Unanimous All-American (2022, 2023); Big Ten Most Valuable Player (2023); Big Ten Offensive Player of the Year (2023)

Career NFL statistics as of Week 9, 2026
- Receptions: 114
- Receiving yards: 1,638
- Receiving touchdowns: 14
- Stats at Pro Football Reference

Marvin Darnell Harrison Jr. (born August 11, 2002), nicknamed "Maserati Marv", is an American professional football wide receiver for the Houston Texans of the National Football League. He played college football for the Ohio State Buckeyes, where he was a two-time unanimous All-American, one of only eleven players in Big Ten Conference history, and the Fred Biletnikoff Award winner in 2023.

Harrison was selected fourth overall by the Arizona Cardinals in the 2024 NFL draft, with whom he played two-and-a-half seasons before being traded to the Texans in 2026. He is the son of Pro Football Hall of Fame wide receiver Marvin Harrison.

== Early life ==
Harrison was born on August 11, 2002, in Philadelphia, Pennsylvania. He is the son of Dawne Harrison and Marvin Harrison, a Pro Football Hall of Fame wide receiver who played for the NFL's Indianapolis Colts from 1996 to 2008. Harrison grew up playing football and basketball, ultimately deciding to focus solely on football when he entered high school. He attended La Salle College High School as a freshman before transferring to St. Joseph's Preparatory School. At St. Joseph's Harrison would help lead the team to three consecutive state championships while setting Philadelphia Catholic League career records with 2,625 receiving yards and 37 receiving touchdowns. While at St. Joseph's, he played with future Ohio State teammate Kyle McCord.

Coming out of high school Harrison was a four-star prospect ranked as the nation's 14th best receiver recruit. He committed to play college football at Ohio State University over offers from Florida, Michigan, Penn State, LSU, Notre Dame, Texas A&M, and his father's alma mater Syracuse. Harrison cited wide receiver coach Brian Hartline as well as the school's atmosphere, facilities and his existing relationship with fellow Buckeyes commit Kyle McCord as being the reasons for his commitment to the school.

College recruiting
Name	Hometown	School	Height	Weight	40^{‡}	Commit date
Marvin Harrison Jr. WR	Philadelphia, Pennsylvania	St. Joseph's Preparatory School	6 ft 3 in (1.91 m)	190 lb (86 kg)	N/A	Oct 31, 2019
Marvin Harrison Jr. WR	Recruit ratings: Rivals: 247Sports: (85)					
Overall recruit ranking:
‡ Refers to 40-yard dash; Note: In many cases, Scout, Rivals, 247Sports, On3, and ESPN may conflict in their listings of height, weight and 40 time.; In these cases, the average was taken. ESPN grades are on a 100-point scale.; Sources: "2020 Team Ranking". Rivals.com.

== College career ==
=== 2021 ===
Harrison enrolled at Ohio State in January 2021. As a freshman in 2021, he received limited playing time behind future first-round NFL draft picks Garrett Wilson, Chris Olave, and Jaxon Smith-Njigba. Having only had five receptions for 68 yards in the regular season, he would make his first career start in the 2022 Rose Bowl after Wilson and Olave declared for the 2022 NFL draft. In the Rose Bowl, he caught six passes for 71 yards and three touchdowns in a 48–45 victory over the Utah Utes.

=== 2022 ===
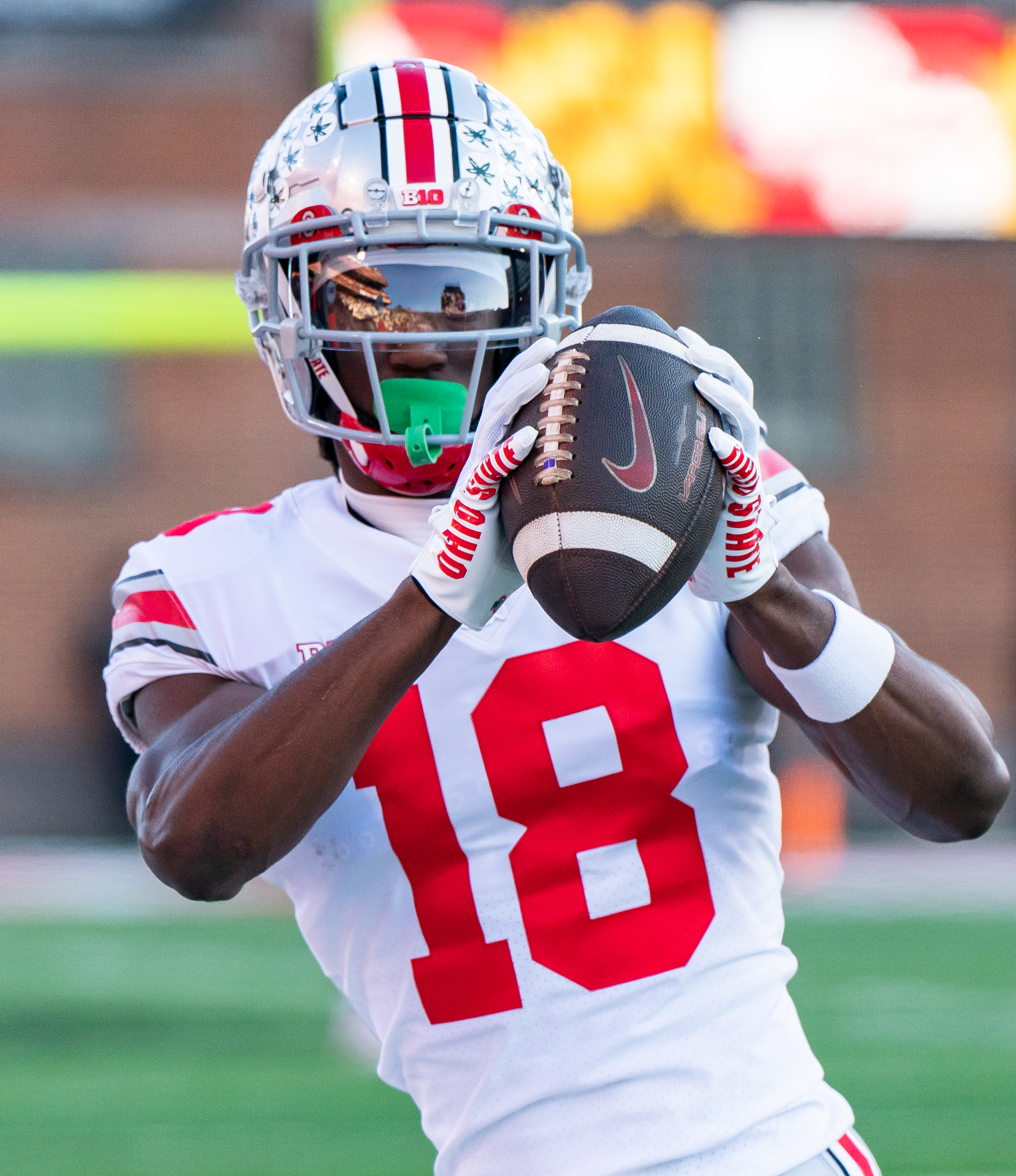
Harrison warming up prior to a game, 2022

Harrison entered his sophomore season with high expectations following his breakout performance in the Rose Bowl. In the Buckeyes' season opener against Notre Dame, Harrison caught five passes for 76 yards. Following an injury to fellow receiver Smith-Njigba against Notre Dame, Harrison became the Buckeyes' #1 receiver for the remainder of the season. In his first game as the team's top receiver, Harrison caught seven passes for a then career-high 184 yards and three touchdowns in a victory over Arkansas State. The following week he had his second consecutive 100-yard game with 102 yards on 6 catches and two touchdowns in a blowout win over Toledo. Following a relatively unimpressive first two conference games, Harrison returned to form against Michigan State, catching 7 passes for 132 yards and three touchdowns. His three touchdowns against Michigan State marked his third career three-touchdown game, the most of any Ohio State receiver.

Harrison set career highs in receptions (10) and yards (185) in a 44–31 victory over Penn State. Two weeks later he would once again have a 100-yard game, this time against Indiana. Against rival Michigan Harrison recorded his sixth 100-yard performance of the season in a 45–23 loss, the Buckeyes' first of the season. Despite the loss to Michigan, Ohio State earned a bid to the College Football Playoff where they would play the defending national champion Georgia Bulldogs in the Peach Bowl. Leading up to the game, Harrison's matchup against corner Kelee Ringo was viewed by many as the potential key to the game. Harrison shone in the first half of the contest, catching five passes for 106 yards and two touchdowns, helping Ohio State gain a 35–24 lead. In the third quarter he was forced to leave the game with a concussion following a hard hit from Javon Bullard. In Harrison's absence Georgia mounted a comeback to win the game 42–41, ending Ohio State's season. At the conclusion of the season, Harrison was voted a unanimous All-American and named the Richter–Howard Receiver of the Year after recording 1,263 yards and 14 touchdowns.

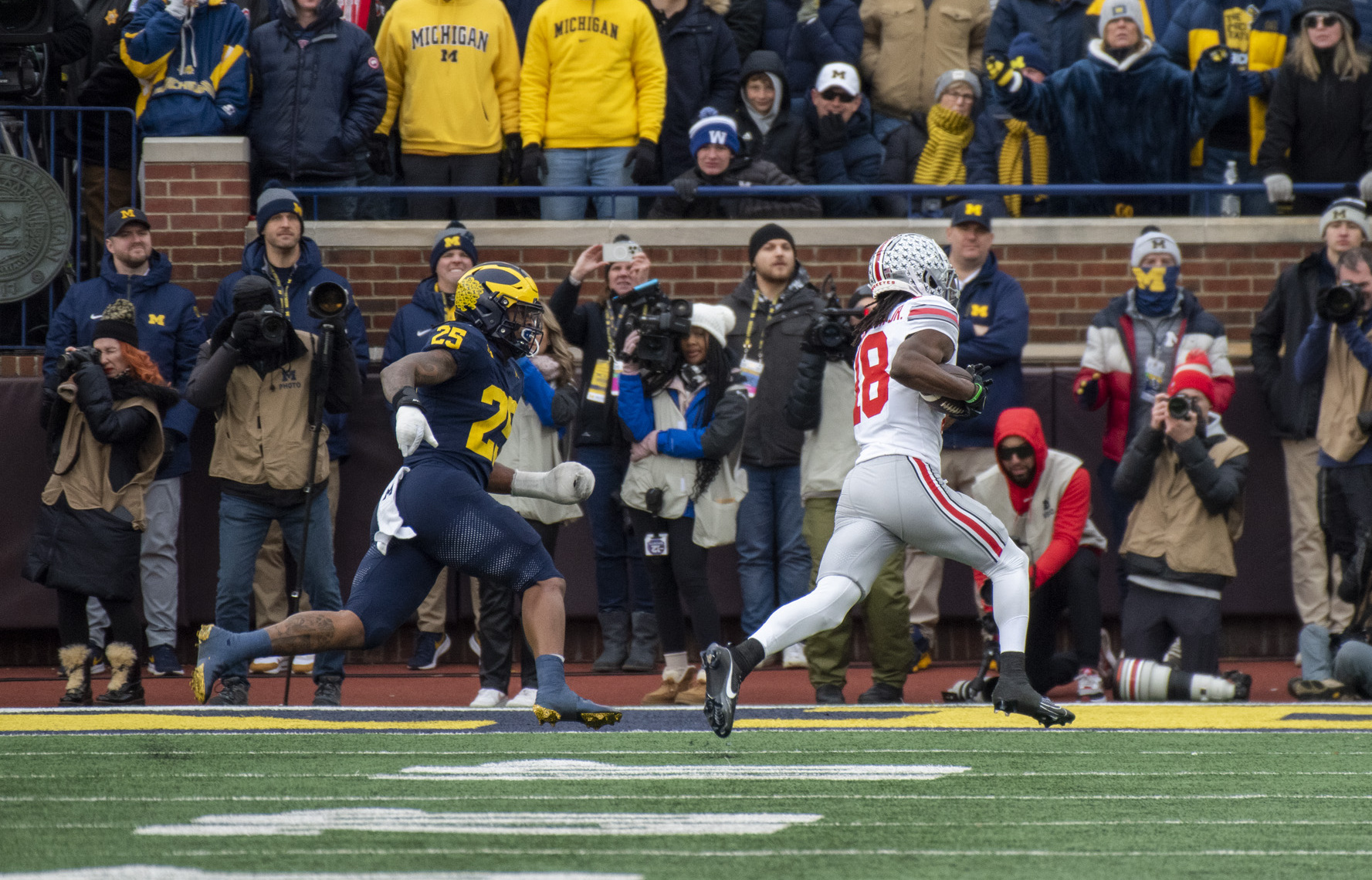
Harrison scores against Michigan in 2023

=== 2023 ===
Entering the 2023 season, Harrison was widely considered to be the best receiver in college football. He finished fourth in the Heisman Trophy voting and won the 2023 Fred Biletnikoff Award after recording 1,211 yards for 14 touchdowns, the latter being tied for third most in the FBS. Harrison declared for the 2024 NFL draft following the season.

== Professional career ==
Pre-draft measurables
Height	Weight	Arm length	Hand span	Wingspan
6 ft 3 1/4 in (1.91 m)	209 lb (95 kg)	31 7/8 in (0.81 m)	9 1/2 in (0.24 m)	6 ft 5 1/4 in (1.96 m)
All values from NFL Combine

=== Arizona Cardinals ===
Harrison was selected by the Arizona Cardinals fourth overall in the 2024 NFL draft. He signed his four-year rookie contract, worth $35.3 million fully guaranteed, on May 23, 2024.

After catching only one pass for four yards in his NFL debut against the Buffalo Bills, Harrison dominated the following week against the Los Angeles Rams with four receptions for 130 yards and two touchdowns, all in the first quarter, as the Cardinals cruised to a 41–10 win. In week six against the Green Bay Packers, Harrison left the game in the first half with a concussion. In week 8, he had six receptions for 111 yards and a touchdown against the Miami Dolphins. He finished his rookie season with 62 receptions for 885 yards and eight touchdowns.

Harrison's second season was marred by injuries throughout the year. In addition to a concussion in week six, Harrison underwent an appendectomy in November and missed two games, suffered a heel injury in week 13 and missed another two games, and suffered a foot injury in week 17. On January 2, 2026, Harrison was placed on season-ending injured reserve. He finished the season third on the team with 41 catches for 608 yards and four touchdowns.

In 2026, after a disappointing start to his third professional season, the Cardinals made Harrison inactive for the team's week five game against the Detroit Lions in preparation for a trade, which was still being finalized.

=== Houston Texans ===
On October 12, 2026, Harrison, along with a 2027 sixth-round pick, was traded to the Houston Texans in exchange for 2027 second-round and seventh-round picks. The trade reunited Harrison with C. J. Stroud, his college teammate from Ohio State.

== Career statistics ==
Legend
**Bold**	Career high

=== NFL ===
Year	Team	Games		Receiving							Fumbles	
Year	Team	GP	GS	Tgt	Rec	Yds	Avg	Y/G	Lng	TD	Fum	Lost
2024	ARI	17	16	**116**	**62**	**885**	14.3	**52.1**	**60**	**8**	**1**	**1**
2025	ARI	12	10	73	41	608	**14.8**	50.7	45	4	0	0
2026	ARI	4	4	13	5	85	17.0	21.3	33	1	0	0
2026	HOU	3	0	11	6	60	10.0	20.0	15	1	0	0
Career		36	30	213	114	1,638	14.4	45.5	60	14	1	1

=== College ===
College statistics
Season	Games		Receiving				Rushing			
Season	GP	GS	Rec	Yds	Avg	TD	Att	Yds	Avg	TD
2021	13	1	11	139	12.6	3	0	0	0.0	0
2022	13	13	**77**	**1,263**	16.4	**14**	**2**	**32**	**16.0**	0
2023	12	12	67	1,211	**18.1**	**14**	**2**	26	13.0	**1**
Career	38	26	155	2,613	16.9	31	4	58	14.5	1

== Career highlights ==
=== Awards and honors ===
College

- Fred Biletnikoff Award (2023)
- 2× Unanimous All-American (2022, 2023)
- Big Ten Most Valuable Player (2023)
- Big Ten Offensive Player of the Year (2023)
- 2× Big Ten Receiver of the Year (2022, 2023)
- 2× First-team All-Big Ten (2022, 2023)

=== Cardinals franchise records ===
Most receiving touchdowns by a rookie (tied with Larry Fitzgerald and Anquan Boldin) – 8.

== Personal life ==
Harrison is a Christian. He is a partner of the Ronald McDonald House Charities of Central Ohio. Fox Sports broadcaster Gus Johnson referred to him as Maserati Marv in college.
