= Austin Keys =

American football player (born 2002)

No. 57 – Washington Commanders
- Position: Linebacker
- Roster status: Practice squad

Personal information
- Born: April 3, 2002 (age 24); Collins, Mississippi, U.S.
- Listed height: 6 ft 2 in (1.88 m)
- Listed weight: 244 lb (111 kg)

Career information
- High school: Seminary (Seminary, Mississippi)
- College: Ole Miss (2020–2022); Auburn (2023–2024)
- NFL draft: 2025: undrafted

Career history
- Minnesota Vikings (2025); Arizona Cardinals (2025); Washington Commanders (2026–present)

Career NFL statistics as of 2026
- Tackles: 9
- Sacks: 1
- Stats at Pro Football Reference

Austin Mylek Keys (born April 3, 2002) is an American professional football linebacker for the Washington Commanders of the National Football League (NFL). He played college football for the Ole Miss Rebels and Auburn Tigers.

== Early life ==
Keys attended Seminary High School located in Seminary, Mississippi. He was rated as a three-star recruit and committed to play college football for the Ole Miss Rebels.

== College career ==
=== Ole Miss ===
As a freshman in 2020, Keys took a redshirt. In 2021, he recorded 12 tackles in six games before an injury cut his season short. In 2022, Keys notched 39 tackles with three and a half being for a loss, two sacks, a forced fumble, and a fumble recovery. After the season, he entered his name into the NCAA transfer portal.

=== Auburn ===
Keys transferred to play for the Auburn Tigers. He made his Auburn debut in the 2023 season opener, where he made the start, notching two tackles in a win over UMass. In week 11, Keys put up three tackles, a pass deflection, and a forced fumble versus Vanderbilt. He finished the 2023 season, playing in eight games due to injury, where he recorded 30 tackles with three for a loss, two sacks, and a forced fumble. During the 2024 season, Keys tallied 39 tackles and two pass deflections.

== Professional career ==
Pre-draft measurables
Height	Weight	Arm length	Hand span	Wingspan	40-yard dash	10-yard split	20-yard split	20-yard shuttle	Three-cone drill	Vertical jump	Broad jump	Bench press
6 ft 2 1/4 in (1.89 m)	229 lb (104 kg)	31 5/8 in (0.80 m)	9 1/4 in (0.23 m)	6 ft 5 7/8 in (1.98 m)	4.63 s	1.64 s	2.69 s	4.44 s	7.41 s	36.5 in (0.93 m)	10 ft 4 in (3.15 m)	21 reps
All values from Pro Day

=== Minnesota Vikings ===
After not being selected in the 2025 NFL draft, Keys signed with the Minnesota Vikings as an undrafted free agent. He made the initial 53-man roster on August 26, 2025. He was one of the seven undrafted free agents that made the Vikings roster. Keys was waived on December 31.

=== Arizona Cardinals ===
On January 1, 2026, Keys was claimed off waivers by the Arizona Cardinals. He was placed on injured reserve on August 15. He was waived with an injury settlement on August 24.

=== Washington Commanders ===
On September 16, 2026, the Washington Commanders signed Keys to their practice squad. On October 10, the Commanders signed him to their active roster. Nine days later, the Commanders released him. He was re-signed to their practice squad on October 21.
