= Blake Gillikin =

American football player (born 1998)

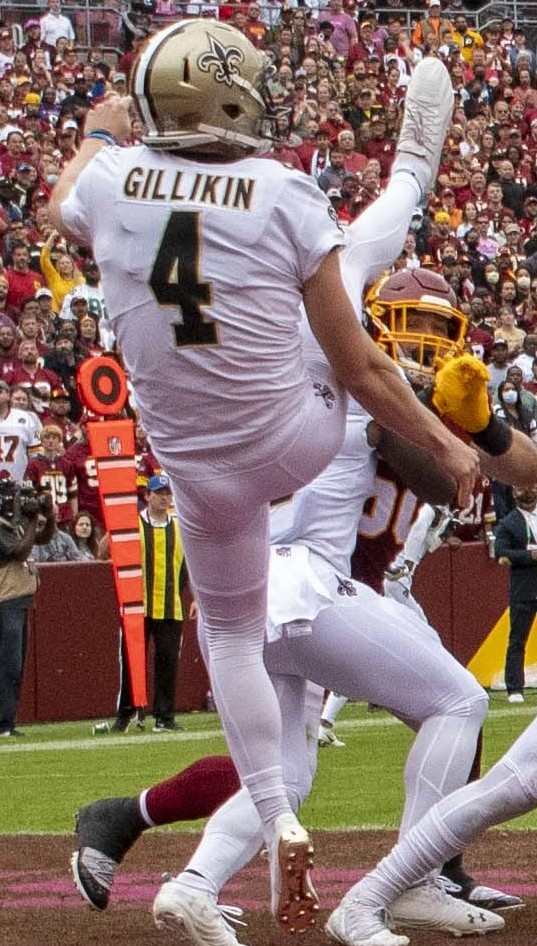
- Gillikin with the New Orleans Saints in 2021

No. 12 – Arizona Cardinals
- Position: Punter
- Roster status: Active

Personal information
- Born: January 21, 1998 (age 28); Atlanta, Georgia, U.S.
- Listed height: 6 ft 2 in (1.88 m)
- Listed weight: 196 lb (89 kg)

Career information
- High school: The Westminster Schools (Atlanta)
- College: Penn State (2016–2019)
- NFL draft: 2020: undrafted

Career history
- New Orleans Saints (2020–2022); Arizona Cardinals (2023–present)

Awards and highlights
- Second-team All-Big Ten (2017)

Career NFL statistics as of Week 10, 2026
- Punts: 317
- Punting yards: 15,169
- Punting average: 47.9
- Longest punt: 77
- Inside 20: 115
- Touchbacks: 19
- Stats at Pro Football Reference

Blake Thomas Gillikin (born January 21, 1998) is an American professional football punter for the Arizona Cardinals of the National Football League (NFL). He played college football for the Penn State Nittany Lions.

Gillikin is fifth in NFL history in yards per punt (47.85).

== Early life ==
A former resident of Smyrna, Georgia, Gillikin helped lead The Westminster Schools to its first GHSA Football Class AAA Georgia State Championship since 1978 in 2015, and was rated as a five-star punter and a five-star kicker by Kohl's Kicking Camp.

== College career ==
A four-year starter at Penn State, Gillikin is ranked No. 2 on Penn State's career punting average charts (43.03 avg.) He landed 53 career punts downed inside the opponent's ten-yard line (seven in 2016, 18 in 2017, 12 in 2018, 15 in 2019) and is the only player in program history with seven punts of 65 or more yards. Gillikin is second all time in net punting yards in school history behind Jeremy Kapinos. In 2019, Gillikin averaged 42.2 yards per punt as was selected All-Big Ten Conference honorable mention by the conference coaches and media. Was also selected for the CoSIDA Academic All-American first-team.

== Professional career ==
Pre-draft measurables
Height	Weight
6 ft 2 in (1.88 m)	200 lb (91 kg)
Values from Pro Day

=== New Orleans Saints ===
Gillikin signed with the New Orleans Saints as an undrafted free agent on April 27, 2020. He was placed on injured reserve on September 9.

Gillikin was named the Saints starting punter for the 2021 season after the team released longtime starter Thomas Morstead in the offseason.

Gillikin did not receive a qualifying offer following the 2022 season and became a free agent on March 15, 2023. On March 16, Gillikin re-signed with the Saints. He was waived on August 29, after losing the punting battle to Lou Hedley.

=== Arizona Cardinals ===
On October 3, 2023, Gillikin was signed by the Arizona Cardinals.

In Week 9 of the 2024 season, Gillikin punted four times with three inside the 20-yard line in a 29-9 win over the Chicago Bears, earning NFC Special Teams Player of the Week.

On October 11, 2025, Gillikin was placed on injured reserve due to a lingering back injury.

On March 8, 2026, Gillikin re-signed with the Cardinals on a one-year contract.

== NFL career statistics ==
Legend
	Led the league
**Bold**	Career high

=== Regular season ===
Year	Team	GP	Punting						
Year	Team	GP	Punts	Yds	Lng	Avg	Blk	Ins20	RetY
2021	NOR	**17**	**83**	**3,956**	63	47.7	0	29	**417**
2022	NOR	**17**	77	3,571	68	46.4	0	**32**	232
2023	ARI	13	51	2,580	**77**	50.6	0	11	318
2024	ARI	13	38	1,887	63	49.7	0	19	183
2025	ARI	5	22	1,138	63	**51.7**	0	8	99
2026	ARI	10	46	2,037	63	44.3	0	16	175
Career		75	317	15,169	77	47.9	0	115	1,424
