= 2024 Arizona Cardinals season =

105th season in franchise history

- Owner: Michael Bidwill
- General manager: Monti Ossenfort
- Head coach: Jonathan Gannon
- Home stadium: State Farm Stadium

Results
- Record: 8–9
- Division place: 3rd NFC West
- Playoffs: Did not qualify
- All-Pros: SS Budda Baker (2nd team)
- Pro Bowlers: TE Trey McBride; SS Budda Baker

Uniform
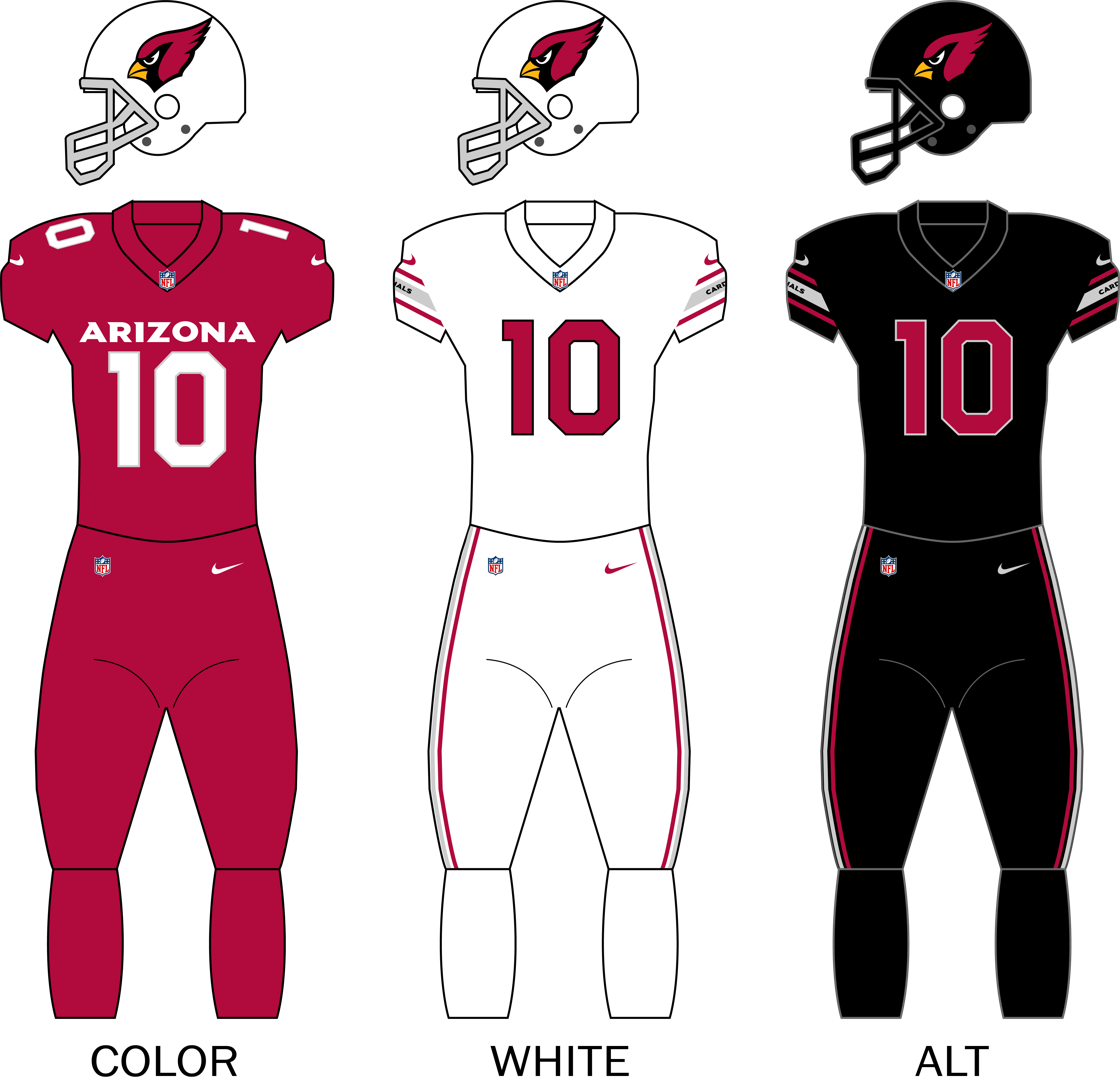

The 2024 season was the Arizona Cardinals' 105th in the National Football League (NFL), their 37th in Arizona and their second under the head coach/general manager tandem of Jonathan Gannon and Monti Ossenfort. The Cardinals improved on their 4–13 record from the previous 2 seasons following a Week 9 victory against the Chicago Bears. However, they suffered their fourth late season collapse in five years and were eliminated from playoff contention for the third consecutive season after an overtime loss to the Carolina Panthers coupled with the Los Angeles Rams beating the New York Jets in Week 16. They would secure a losing record for the third consecutive season following a loss against the Rams in Week 17. Despite the disappointing season, the Cardinals reached 600 lifetime wins in the season finale.

== Offseason ==
=== Signings ===
Position	Player	2023 team	Contract	Date signed
CB	Sean Murphy-Bunting	Tennessee Titans	3 year, $25.5 million	March 14
RB	DeeJay Dallas	Seattle Seahawks	3 year, $8.25 million	March 14
DL	Justin Jones	Chicago Bears	3 year, $31.16 million	March 14
DL	Bilal Nichols	Las Vegas Raiders	3 year, $21 million	March 14
T	Jonah Williams	Cincinnati Bengals	2 year, $30 million	March 14
LB	Mack Wilson	New England Patriots	3 year, $12.75 million	March 14
DL	Khyiris Tonga	Minnesota Vikings	1 year, $1.75 million	March 15
WR	Chris Moore	Tennessee Titans	1 year, $2 million	March 18
C	Evan Brown	Seattle Seahawks	1 year, $2.35 million	March 20
LB	Markus Bailey	Cincinnati Bengals	1 year, $1.12 million	May 7
WR	Zay Jones	Jacksonville Jaguars	1 year, $1.41 million	May 13
LB	Marquis Haynes	Carolina Panthers	1 year, $0.79 million	August 6
CB	Delonte Hood	Denver Broncos	1 year, $0.79 million	August 6
LB	Hassan Hall	Kansas City Chiefs	1 year, $0.79 million	August 13
CB	Daylen Baldwin	Atlanta Falcons	1 year, $0.79 million	August 13

=== Re-signings ===
Position	Player	Contract	Date signed
DL	L. J. Collier	1 year, $1.29 million	March 8
LB	Krys Barnes	1 year, $1.29 million	March 13
LS	Aaron Brewer	1 year, $1.37 million	March 13
C	Trystan Colon	1 year, $1.75 million	March 13
P	Blake Gillikin	2 year, $3.7 million	March 13
C	Keith Ismael	1 year, $1.1 million	March 13
CB	Bobby Price	1 year, $1.29 million	March 13
T	Elijah Wilkinson	1 year, $1.82 million	March 13
WR	Greg Dortch	1 year, $1 million	April 3

=== Extensions ===
Position	Player	Contract	Date signed
LB	Zaven Collins	2 year, $14 million	August 3
C	Hjalte Froholdt	2 year, $12 million	August 21

=== Trade acquisitions ===
Position	Player	2023 team	Contract	Traded away	Date
QB	Desmond Ridder	Atlanta Falcons	4 year, $5.36 million	WR Rondale Moore	March 14

=== Departures ===
Position	Player	2024 team
WR	Marquise Brown	Kansas City Chiefs
C	Pat Elflein	San Francisco 49ers
CB	Rashad Fenton	TBD
DL	Leki Fotu	New York Jets
RB	Marlon Mack	TBD
TE	Geoff Swaim	Cleveland Browns
LB	Ezekiel Turner	San Francisco 49ers
DL	Carlos Watkins	Washington Commanders
LB	Josh Woods	TBD

== Draft ==
2024 Arizona Cardinals draft selections
Round	Selection	Player	Position	College	Notes
1	4	Marvin Harrison Jr.	WR	Ohio State	
1	27	Darius Robinson	DE	Missouri	From Texans (Note: The Cardinals traded 2023 first- and fourth-round selections (3rd and 105th overall) to the Houston Texans in exchange for first- and third-round selections (27th and 90th overall), and 2023 first- and second-round selections (12th and 33rd overall).)
2	35	Traded to the Atlanta Falcons (Note: The Cardinals traded second- and sixth-round selections (35th and 186th overall) to the Atlanta Falcons in exchange for second- and third-round selections (43rd and 79th overall).)			
2	43	Max Melton	CB	Rutgers	From Falcons
3	66	Trey Benson	RB	Florida State	
3	71	Isaiah Adams	G	Illinois	From Titans (Note: The Cardinals traded 2023 second and third-round selections (33rd and 81st overall) to the Tennessee Titans in exchange for a third-round selection (71st overall), and 2023 second- and third-round selections (41st and 72nd overall).)
3	79	Traded to the Indianapolis Colts (Note: The Cardinals traded a third-round selection (79th overall) to the Indianapolis Colts in exchange for third- and sixth-round selections (82nd and 191st overall).)			From Jaguars via Falcons
3	82	Tip Reiman	TE	Illinois	From Colts
3	90	Elijah Jones	CB	Boston College	From Texans
4	104	Dadrion Taylor-Demerson	S	Texas Tech	
5	138	Xavier Thomas	LB	Clemson	
5	156	Traded to the Cleveland Browns (Note: The Cardinals traded a fifth-round selection (156th overall) to the Cleveland Browns in exchange for a seventh-round selection (230th overall) and QB Joshua Dobbs.)			From Eagles (Note: The Cardinals traded a third-round selection (66th overall) to the Philadelphia Eagles in exchange for a fifth-round selection (156th overall) and a 2023 third-round selection (94th overall). The trade also settled Philadelphia's tampering complaint against Arizona regarding the Cardinals' hiring of Eagles DC Jonathan Gannon as their head coach.)
5	162	Christian Jones	OT	Texas	From Texans
6	178	Traded to the Carolina Panthers (Note: The Cardinals traded a sixth-round selection (178th overall) and a 2025 seventh-round selection to the Carolina Panthers in exchange for WR Robbie Chosen.)			
6	186	Traded to the Atlanta Falcons			From Vikings (Note: The Cardinals traded a seventh-round selection (230th overall) and QB Joshua Dobbs to the Minnesota Vikings in exchange for a sixth-round selection (186th overall).)
6	191	Tejhaun Palmer	WR	UAB	From Colts
7	224	Traded to the Houston Texans			
7	226	Jaden Davis	CB	Miami (FL)	From Giants (Note: The Cardinals traded LB Isaiah Simmons to the New York Giants in exchange for a seventh-round selection (226th overall).)
7	230	Traded to the Minnesota Vikings			

2024 Arizona Cardinals undrafted free agents
Name	Position	College	Ref.
Myles Murphy	DT	North Carolina	
Joe Shimko	LS	NC State	
Xavier Weaver	WR	Colorado	

Draft trades

== Staff ==
2024 Arizona Cardinals staff
Front office: Owner/chairman/president – Michael Bidwill; General manager – Monti Ossenfort; Assistant general manager – Dave Sears; Vice president of football operations & facilities – Matt Caracciolo; Director of pro personnel – Glen Fox; Assistant director of player personnel – Rob Kisiel; Assistant director of college scouting – Ryan Gold; Director of football administration – Matt Harriss; Head coaches: Head coach – Jonathan Gannon; Assistant head coach/special teams coordinator – Jeff Rodgers; Offensive coaches: Offensive coordinator – Drew Petzing; Quarterbacks – Israel Woolfork; Assistant quarterbacks – Connor Senger; Running backs – Autry Denson; Passing game coordinator/wide receivers – Drew Terrell; Tight ends – Ben Steele; Offensive line – Klayton Adams; Assistant offensive line – Chris Cook; Pass game specialist – Spencer Whipple; Bill Bidwell coaching fellow – Blaine Gautier	Defensive coaches: Defensive coordinator – Nick Rallis; Defensive line – Derrick LeBlanc; Assistant defensive line – William Peagler; Linebackers – Sam Siefkes; Outside linebackers – Rob Rodriguez; Defensive backs – Patrick Toney; Cornerbacks – Ryan Smith; Defensive quality control – Ronald Booker; Special teams coaches: Assistant special teams – Sam Sewell; Assistant to the head coach – Brandon Schwab; Director, football strategy – Kenny Bell; Director, football performance – Shea Thompson; Coaching assistant – Jay Razzano; Strength and conditioning: Strength and conditioning – Buddy Morris; Assistant strength and conditioning – Mark Naylor

== Final roster ==
2024 Arizona Cardinals roster
Quarterbacks (QB): 1 Kyler Murray; 15 Clayton Tune; Running backs (RB): 22 Michael Carter; 20 DeeJay Dallas; 37 Tony Jones Jr.; Wide receivers (WR): 4 Greg Dortch; 18 Marvin Harrison Jr.; 17 Zay Jones; 0 Zach Pascal; 89 Xavier Weaver; 14 Michael Wilson; Tight ends (TE): 84 Elijah Higgins; 85 Trey McBride; 87 Tip Reiman; 81 Travis Vokolek	Offensive linemen (OL): 74 Isaiah Adams G; 68 Kelvin Beachum T; 62 Evan Brown G; 63 Trystan Colon G; 72 Hjalte Froholdt C; 59 Jon Gaines II C/G; 75 Christian Jones T; 50 Nick Leverett G; 71 Luke Tenuta T; Defensive linemen (DL): 91 L. J. Collier DE; 96 Naquan Jones DE; 98 Roy Lopez NT; 56 Darius Robinson DE; 55 Dante Stills DE; 95 Khyiris Tonga NT	Linebackers (LB): 51 Krys Barnes ILB; 53 Baron Browning OLB; 25 Zaven Collins OLB; 52 Victor Dimukeje OLB; 48 Milo Eifler ILB; 27 Vi Jones ILB; 58 Julian Okwara OLB; 44 Owen Pappoe ILB; 54 Xavier Thomas OLB; 7 Kyzir White ILB; 49 Benton Whitley OLB; 2 Mack Wilson ILB; Defensive backs (DB): 3 Budda Baker FS; 36 Andre Chachere FS; 13 Kei'Trel Clark CB; 16 Max Melton CB; 23 Sean Murphy-Bunting CB; 26 Jammie Robinson FS; 42 Dadrion Taylor-Demerson SS; 24 Starling Thomas V CB; 34 Jalen Thompson SS; 21 Garrett Williams CB; Special teams (ST): 46 Aaron Brewer LS; 10 Michael Palardy P; 38 Chad Ryland K	Practice squad: 82 Andre Baccellia WR; 41 Markus Bailey ILB; 57 Keshawn Banks OLB; -- Angelo Blackson DE (PS/I); 39 Jaden Davis CB; 97 Anthony Goodlow DE; 30 Darren Hall CB; 29 Hassan Hall RB; 79 Matthew Jones G; 94 P. J. Mustipher NT; 83 Tejhaun Palmer WR; 80 Bernhard Seikovits TE (IPP); 90 Ben Stille DE; Reserve: 66 Jackson Barton T (IR); 33 Trey Benson RB (IR); 32 Joey Blount SS (IR); 6 James Conner RB (IR); 31 Emari Demercado RB (IR); 45 Dennis Gardeck OLB (IR); 12 Blake Gillikin P (IR); 76 Will Hernandez G (IR); 70 Paris Johnson Jr. T (IR); 28 Elijah Jones CB (IR); 93 Justin Jones DE (IR); 43 Jesse Luketa OLB (IR); 92 Bilal Nichols DE (IR); 61 Carter O'Donnell T (IR); 9 BJ Ojulari OLB (IR); 5 Matt Prater K (IR); 73 Jonah Williams T (IR); Rookies in italics 53 active, 17 reserve, 13 practice squad (1 exempt)

== Preseason ==
Week	Date	Opponent	Result	Record	Venue	Sources
1	August 10	New Orleans Saints	L 14–16	0–1	State Farm Stadium	Recap
2	August 17	at Indianapolis Colts	L 13–21	0–2	Lucas Oil Stadium	Recap
3	August 25	at Denver Broncos	L 12–38	0–3	Empower Field at Mile High	Recap

== Regular season ==
=== Schedule ===
Week	Date	Opponent	Result	Record	Venue	Sources
1	September 8	at Buffalo Bills	**L** 28–34	0–1	Highmark Stadium	Recap
2	September 15	**Los Angeles Rams**	**W** 41–10	1–1	State Farm Stadium	Recap
3	September 22	Detroit Lions	**L** 13–20	1–2	State Farm Stadium	Recap
4	September 29	Washington Commanders	**L** 14–42	1–3	State Farm Stadium	Recap
5	October 6	at **San Francisco 49ers**	**W** 24–23	2–3	Levi's Stadium	Recap
6	October 13	at Green Bay Packers	**L** 13–34	2–4	Lambeau Field	Recap
7	October 21	Los Angeles Chargers	**W** 17–15	3–4	State Farm Stadium	Recap
8	October 27	at Miami Dolphins	**W** 28–27	4–4	Hard Rock Stadium	Recap
9	November 3	Chicago Bears	**W** 29–9	5–4	State Farm Stadium	Recap
10	November 10	New York Jets	**W** 31–6	6–4	State Farm Stadium	Recap
11	Bye					
12	November 24	at **Seattle Seahawks**	**L** 6–16	6–5	Lumen Field	Recap
13	December 1	at Minnesota Vikings	**L** 22–23	6–6	U.S. Bank Stadium	Recap
14	December 8	**Seattle Seahawks**	**L** 18–30	6–7	State Farm Stadium	Recap
15	December 15	New England Patriots	**W** 30–17	7–7	State Farm Stadium	Recap
16	December 22	at Carolina Panthers	**L** 30–36 (OT)	7–8	Bank of America Stadium	Recap
17	December 28	at **Los Angeles Rams**	**L** 9–13	7–9	SoFi Stadium	Recap
18	January 5	**San Francisco 49ers**	**W** 47–24	8–9	State Farm Stadium	Recap

Note: Intra-division opponents are in bold text.

=== Game summaries ===
==== Week 1: at Buffalo Bills ====
Week 1: Arizona Cardinals at Buffalo Bills – Game summary

Quarter	1	2	3	4	Total
Cardinals	7	10	0	11	**28**
**Bills**	0	10	14	10	**34**

at Highmark Stadium, Orchard Park, New York

- Date: September 8
- Game time: 1:00 p.m. EDT/10:00 a.m. MST
- Game weather: Cloudy, 61 °F (16 °C)
- Game attendance: 70,542
- Referee: Tra Blake
- TV announcers (CBS): Tom McCarthy, Jay Feely, Ross Tucker and Tiffany Blackmon
- Recap, Game Book

Game information

**First quarter**

- ARI – Michael Wilson 5-yard pass from Kyler Murray (Matt Prater kick), 7:47. Cardinals 7–0. **Drive: 13 plays, 70 yards, 7:13.**

**Second quarter**

- ARI – Matt Prater 29-yard field goal, 14:57. Cardinals 10–0. **Drive: 10 plays, 60 yards, 5:27.**
- BUF – Tyler Bass 37-yard field goal, 9:47. Cardinals 10–3. **Drive: 9 plays, 51 yards, 5:10.**
- ARI – James Conner 3-yard run (Matt Prater kick), 2:40. Cardinals 17–3. **Drive: 13 plays, 71 yards, 7:07.**
- BUF – Josh Allen 7-yard run (Tyler Bass kick), 0:19. Cardinals 17–10. **Drive: 7 plays, 70 yards, 2:21.**

**Third quarter**

- BUF – Mack Hollins 11-yard pass from Josh Allen (Tyler Bass kick), 9:51. Tied 17–17. **Drive: 10 plays, 60 yards, 5:09.**
- BUF – Khalil Shakir 11-yard pass from Josh Allen (Tyler Bass kick), 2:37. Bills 24–17. **Drive: 5 plays, 21 yards, 2:48.**

**Fourth quarter**

- ARI – Matt Prater 31-yard field goal, 13:32. Bills 24–20. **Drive: 8 plays, 58 yards, 4:05.**
- BUF – Josh Allen 6-yard run (Tyler Bass kick), 8:44. Bills 31–20. **Drive: 10 plays, 70 yards, 4:48.**
- ARI – DeeJay Dallas 96-yard kickoff return (James Conner run), 8:31. Bills 31–28.
- BUF – Tyler Bass 39-yard field goal, 1:56. Bills 34–28. **Drive: 5 plays, 21 yards, 2:34.**

**Top passers**

- ARI – Kyler Murray – 21/31, 162 yards, TD
- BUF – Josh Allen – 18/23, 232 yards, 2 TD

**Top rushers**

- ARI – Kyler Murray – 5 rushes, 57 yards
- BUF – James Cook – 19 rushes, 71 yards

**Top receivers**

- ARI – Greg Dortch – 6 receptions, 47 yards
- BUF – Keon Coleman – 4 receptions, 51 yards

==== Week 2: vs. Los Angeles Rams ====
Week 2: Los Angeles Rams at Arizona Cardinals – Game summary

Quarter	1	2	3	4	Total
Rams	0	3	7	0	**10**
**Cardinals**	14	10	10	7	**41**

at State Farm Stadium, Glendale, Arizona

- Date: September 15
- Game time: 1:05 p.m. MST
- Game weather: None (retractable roof closed)
- Game attendance: 63,331
- Referee: John Hussey
- TV announcers (Fox): Adam Amin, Mark Sanchez and Kristina Pink
- Recap, Game Book

Game information

**First quarter**

- ARI – Marvin Harrison Jr. 23-yard pass from Kyler Murray (Matt Prater kick), 11:03. Cardinals 7–0. **Drive: 6 plays, 60 yards, 2:27.**
- ARI – Marvin Harrison Jr. 60-yard pass from Kyler Murray (Matt Prater kick), 8:47. Cardinals 14–0. **Drive: 1 play, 60 yards, 0:10.**

**Second quarter**

- ARI – Elijah Higgins 18-yard pass from Kyler Murray (Matt Prater kick), 13:29. Cardinals 21–0. **Drive: 13 plays, 99 yards, 8:31.**
- LAR – Joshua Karty 29-yard field goal, 9:38. Cardinals 21–3. **Drive: 7 plays, 59 yards, 3:51.**
- ARI – Matt Prater 48-yard field goal, 5:09. Cardinals 24–3. **Drive: 7 plays, 40 yards, 4:29.**

**Third quarter**

- ARI – James Conner 5-yard run (Matt Prater kick), 10:33. Cardinals 31–3. **Drive: 8 plays, 70 yards, 4:27.**
- ARI – Matt Prater 57-yard field goal, 3:26. Cardinals 34–3. **Drive: 9 plays, 43 yards, 5:13.**
- LAR – Kyren Williams 4-yard run (Joshua Karty kick), 0:41. Cardinals 34–10. **Drive: 8 plays, 70 yards, 2:46.**

**Fourth quarter**

- ARI – Trey McBride fumble recovery in the end zone (Matt Prater kick), 9:02. Cardinals 41–10. **Drive: 11 plays, 70 yards, 6:39.**

**Top passers**

- LAR – Matthew Stafford – 19/27, 216 yards
- ARI – Kyler Murray – 17/21, 266 yards, 3 TD

**Top rushers**

- LAR – Blake Corum – 8 rushes, 28 yards
- ARI – James Conner – 21 rushes, 122 yards, TD

**Top receivers**

- LAR – Demarcus Robinson – 2 receptions, 50 yards
- ARI – Marvin Harrison Jr. – 4 receptions, 130 yards, 2 TD

The Cardinals won by 31 points, their largest margin of victory since 2016, when they secured a 44–6 win also against the Rams. Quarterback Kyler Murray posted a perfect passer rating completing 17 of 21 passes for 266 yards and 3 touchdowns. This was the Cardinals' first home win over the Rams since 2014, additionally this was the Cardinals first win in the NFC West since week 10 of the 2022 season.

==== Week 3: vs. Detroit Lions ====
Week 3: Detroit Lions at Arizona Cardinals – Game summary

Quarter	1	2	3	4	Total
**Lions**	7	13	0	0	**20**
Cardinals	7	3	0	3	**13**

at State Farm Stadium, Glendale, Arizona

- Date: September 22
- Game time: 1:25 p.m. MST
- Game weather: None (retractable roof closed)
- Game attendance: 63,650
- Referee: Brad Rogers
- TV announcers (Fox): Chris Myers, Mark Schlereth, and Jen Hale
- Recap, Game Book

Game information

**First quarter**

- DET – David Montgomery 1-yard run (Jake Bates kick), 10:16. Lions 7–0. **Drive: 9 plays, 70 yards, 4:40.**
- ARI – Marvin Harrison Jr. 10-yard pass from Kyler Murray (Matt Prater kick), 5:08. Tied 7–7. **Drive: 8 plays, 70 yards, 5:08.**

**Second quarter**

- DET – Amon-Ra St. Brown 5-yard pass from Jared Goff (kick failed, wide right), 12:27. Lions 13–7. **Drive: 13 plays, 70 yards, 7:41.**
- DET – Jahmyr Gibbs 20-yard pass from Jared Goff (Jake Bates kick), 0:29. Lions 20–7. **Drive: 7 plays, 72 yards, 3:54.**
- ARI – Matt Prater 42-yard field goal, 0:00. Lions 20–10. **Drive: 6 plays, 46 yards, 0:29.**

**Third quarter**

- No scoring plays.

**Fourth quarter**

- ARI – Matt Prater 45-yard field goal, 3:48. Lions 20–13. **Drive: 9 plays, 65 yards, 3:00.**

**Top passers**

- DET – Jared Goff – 18/23, 198 yards 2 TD, INT
- ARI – Kyler Murray – 21/34, 205 yards, TD, INT

**Top rushers**

- DET – David Montgomery – 23 rushes, 106 yards, TD
- ARI – Kyler Murray – 5 rushes, 45 yards

**Top receivers**

- DET – Amon-Ra St. Brown – 7 receptions, 74 yards, TD
- ARI – Marvin Harrison Jr. – 5 receptions, 64 yards, TD

==== Week 4: vs. Washington Commanders ====
Week 4: Washington Commanders at Arizona Cardinals – Game summary

Quarter	1	2	3	4	Total
**Commanders**	7	10	10	15	**42**
Cardinals	7	0	7	0	**14**

at State Farm Stadium, Glendale, Arizona

- Date: September 29
- Game time: 1:05 p.m. MST
- Game weather: None (retractable roof closed)
- Game attendance: 63,286
- Referee: Craig Wrolstad
- TV announcers (Fox): Chris Myers, Mark Schlereth and Jen Hale
- Recap, Game Book

Game information

**First quarter**

- ARI – Marvin Harrison Jr. 2-yard pass from Kyler Murray (Matt Prater kick), 9:54. Cardinals 7–0. **Drive: 9 plays, 55 yards, 5:06.**
- WAS – Brian Robinson Jr. 6-yard run (Austin Seibert kick), 5:13. Tied 7–7. **Drive: 9 plays, 70 yards, 4:41.**

**Second quarter**

- WAS – Jeremy McNichols 27-yard run (Austin Seibert kick), 10:18. Commanders 14–7. **Drive: 13 plays, 93 yards, 7:21.**
- WAS – Austin Seibert 45-yard field goal, 0:00. Commanders 17–7. **Drive: 5 plays, 31 yards, 0:29.**

**Third quarter**

- WAS – Jayden Daniels 9-yard run (Austin Seibert kick), 13:52. Commanders 24–7. **Drive: 3 plays, 70 yards, 1:08.**
- WAS – Austin Seibert 38-yard field goal, 5:16. Commanders 27–7. **Drive: 11 plays, 41 yards, 6:37.**
- ARI – James Conner 6-yard run (Matt Prater kick), 0:11. Commanders 27–14. **Drive: 11 plays, 74 yards, 5:05.**

**Fourth quarter**

- WAS – Terry McLaurin 10-yard pass from Jayden Daniels (Jayden Daniels–Zach Ertz pass), 8:30. Commanders 35–14. **Drive: 12 plays, 70 yards, 6:41.**
- WAS – Jeremy McNichols 7-yard run (Austin Seibert kick), 4:30. Commanders 42–14. **Drive: 8 plays, 76 yards, 2:41.**

**Top passers**

- WAS – Jayden Daniels – 26/30, 233 yards, TD, INT
- ARI – Kyler Murray – 16/22, 142 yards, TD

**Top rushers**

- WAS – Brian Robinson Jr. – 21 rushes, 101 yards, TD
- ARI – James Conner – 18 rushes, 104 yards, TD

**Top receivers**

- WAS – Olamide Zaccheaus – 6 receptions, 85 yards
- ARI – Marvin Harrison Jr. – 5 receptions, 45 yards, TD

The Cardinals were crushed at home by the Washington Commanders and star rookie quarterback Jayden Daniels despite taking an early lead.

==== Week 5: at San Francisco 49ers ====
Week 5: Arizona Cardinals at San Francisco 49ers – Game summary

Quarter	1	2	3	4	Total
**Cardinals**	7	3	3	11	**24**
49ers	10	13	0	0	**23**

at Levi's Stadium, Santa Clara, California

- Date: October 6
- Game time: 1:05 p.m. MST & PDT
- Game weather: Sunny, 89 °F (32 °C)
- Game attendance: 71,310
- Referee: Land Clark
- TV announcers (Fox): Kevin Burkhardt, Tom Brady, Erin Andrews and Tom Rinaldi
- Recap, Game Book

Game information

**First quarter**

- ARI – Kyler Murray 50-yard run (Chad Ryland kick), 13:12. Cardinals 7–0. **Drive: 2 plays, 72 yards, 0:47.**
- SF – Jake Moody 28-yard field goal, 10:25. Cardinals 7–3. **Drive: 6 plays, 60 yards, 2:47.**
- SF – George Kittle 4-yard pass from Brock Purdy (Jake Moody kick), 2:20. 49ers 10–7. **Drive: 13 plays, 76 yards, 7:11.**

**Second quarter**

- ARI – Chad Ryland 30-yard field goal, 12:43. Tied 10–10. **Drive: 10 plays, 58 yards, 4:37.**
- SF – Jake Moody 20-yard field goal, 6:59. 49ers 13–10. **Drive: 11 plays, 68 yards, 5:44.**
- SF – Deommodore Lenoir 61-yard return of blocked field goal (Jake Moody kick), 4:59. 49ers 20–10.
- SF – Mitch Wishnowsky 26-yard field goal, 0:00. 49ers 23–10. **Drive: 8 plays, 33 yards, 1:50.**

**Third quarter**

- ARI – Chad Ryland 42-yard field goal, 9:59. 49ers 23–13. **Drive: 4 plays, 1 yard, 1:53.**

**Fourth quarter**

- ARI – Elijah Higgins 2-yard pass from Kyler Murray (James Conner run), 11:25. 49ers 23–21. **Drive: 12 plays, 73 yards, 6:27.**
- ARI – Chad Ryland 35-yard field goal, 1:37. Cardinals 24–23. **Drive: 14 plays, 74 yards, 4:34.**

**Top passers**

- ARI – Kyler Murray – 19/30, 195 yards, TD, INT
- SF – Brock Purdy – 19/35, 244 yards, TD, 2 INT

**Top rushers**

- ARI – James Conner – 19 rushes, 86 yards
- SF – Jordan Mason – 14 rushes, 89 yards

**Top receivers**

- ARI – Michael Wilson – 5 receptions, 78 yards
- SF – Brandon Aiyuk – 8 receptions, 147 yards

The Cardinals staged a second half comeback to knock off the defending NFC Champion 49ers on the road.

==== Week 6: at Green Bay Packers ====
Week 6: Arizona Cardinals at Green Bay Packers – Game summary

Quarter	1	2	3	4	Total
Cardinals	0	10	3	0	**13**
**Packers**	7	17	7	3	**34**

at Lambeau Field, Green Bay, Wisconsin

- Date: October 13
- Game time: 12:00 p.m. CDT/10:00 a.m. MST
- Game weather: Rain, 50 °F (10 °C)
- Game attendance: 77,773
- Referee: Alex Kemp
- TV announcers (Fox): Kevin Kugler, Daryl Johnston and Laura Okmin
- Recap, Game Book

Game information

**First quarter**

- GB – Jayden Reed 5-yard pass from Jordan Love (Brayden Narveson kick), 8:55. Packers 7–0. **Drive: 5 plays, 44 yards, 2:31.**

**Second quarter**

- GB – Romeo Doubs 10-yard pass from Jordan Love (Brayden Narveson kick), 14:55. Packers 14–0. **Drive: 11 plays, 80 yards, 6:42.**
- GB – Brayden Narveson 36-yard field goal, 6:32. Packers 17–0. **Drive: 12 plays, 72 yards, 6:48.**
- GB – Christian Watson 44-yard pass from Jordan Love (Brayden Narveson kick), 4:32. Packers 24–0. **Drive: 1 play, 44 yards, 0:07.**
- ARI – Michael Wilson 18-yard pass from Kyler Murray (Chad Ryland kick), 1:56. Packers 24–7. **Drive: 6 plays, 70 yards, 2:36.**
- ARI – Chad Ryland 38-yard field goal, 0:04. Packers 24–10. **Drive: 9 plays, 25 yards, 1:00.**

**Third quarter**

- ARI – Chad Ryland 40-yard field goal, 9:03. Packers 24–13. **Drive: 9 plays, 53 yards, 5:57.**
- GB – Romeo Doubs 20-yard pass from Jordan Love (Brayden Narveson kick), 3:48. Packers 31–13. **Drive: 9 plays, 70 yards, 5:15.**

**Fourth quarter**

- GB – Brayden Narveson 41-yard field goal, 9:28. Packers 34–13. **Drive: 12 plays, 56 yards, 5:44.**

**Top passers**

- ARI – Kyler Murray – 22/32, 214 yards, TD
- GB – Jordan Love – 22/32, 258 yards, 4 TD, INT

**Top rushers**

- ARI – Trey Benson – 5 rushes, 26 yards
- GB – Josh Jacobs – 18 rushes, 62 yards

**Top receivers**

- ARI – Trey McBride – 8 receptions, 96 yards
- GB – Christian Watson – 3 receptions, 68 yards, TD

==== Week 7: vs. Los Angeles Chargers ====
Week 7: Los Angeles Chargers at Arizona Cardinals – Game summary

Quarter	1	2	3	4	Total
Chargers	0	6	3	6	**15**
**Cardinals**	0	7	0	10	**17**

at State Farm Stadium, Glendale, Arizona

- Date: October 21
- Game time: 6:00 p.m. MST
- Game weather: Clear, 85 °F (29 °C) (retractable roof open)
- Game attendance: 64,357
- Referee: Clete Blakeman
- TV announcers (KSAZ/ESPN+): Chris Fowler, Dan Orlovsky, Louis Riddick and Molly McGrath
  Game exclusive to KSAZ through syndication. Out of market on ESPN+.
- Recap, Game Book

Game information

**First quarter**

- No scoring plays.

**Second quarter**

- LAC – Cameron Dicker 59-yard field goal, 11:59. Chargers 3–0. **Drive: 13 plays, 49 yards, 7:01.**
- ARI – Greg Dortch 5-yard pass from Kyler Murray (Chad Ryland kick), 5:40. Cardinals 7–3. **Drive: 10 plays, 79 yards, 6:19.**
- LAC – Cameron Dicker 50-yard field goal, 0:00. Cardinals 7–6. **Drive: 9 plays, 57 yards, 1:47.**

**Third quarter**

- LAC – Cameron Dicker 28-yard field goal, 0:40. Chargers 9–7. **Drive: 10 plays, 45 yards, 5:26.**

**Fourth quarter**

- ARI – Kyler Murray 44-yard run (Chad Ryland kick), 14:14. Cardinals 14–9. **Drive: 4 plays, 70 yards, 1:26.**
- LAC – Cameron Dicker 47-yard field goal, 12:09. Cardinals 14–12. **Drive: 6 plays, 41 yards, 2:05.**
- LAC – Cameron Dicker 40-yard field goal, 1:54. Chargers 15–14. **Drive: 15 plays, 77 yards, 8:12.**
- ARI – Chad Ryland 32-yard field goal, 0:00. Cardinals 17–15. **Drive: 7 plays, 56 yards, 1:54.**

**Top passers**

- LAC – Justin Herbert – 27/39, 349 yards
- ARI – Kyler Murray – 14/26, 145 yards, TD, INT

**Top rushers**

- LAC – J. K. Dobbins – 14 rushes, 40 yards
- ARI – James Conner – 19 rushes, 101 yards

**Top receivers**

- LAC – Will Dissly – 8 receptions, 81 yards
- ARI – James Conner – 2 receptions, 51 yards

==== Week 8: at Miami Dolphins ====
Week 8: Arizona Cardinals at Miami Dolphins – Game summary

Quarter	1	2	3	4	Total
**Cardinals**	0	7	11	10	**28**
Dolphins	10	3	7	7	**27**

at Hard Rock Stadium, Miami Gardens, Florida

- Date: October 27
- Game time: 1:00 p.m. EDT/10:00 a.m. MST
- Game weather: Partly cloudy, 82 °F (28 °C)
- Game attendance: 65,629
- Referee: Clay Martin
- TV announcers (Fox): Jason Benetti, Mark Schlereth and Jen Hale
- Recap, Game Book

Game information

**First quarter**

- MIA – Raheem Mostert 1-yard run (Jason Sanders kick), 10:15. Dolphins 7–0. **Drive: 10 plays, 64 yards, 4:45.**
- MIA – Jason Sanders 53-yard field goal, 1:16. Dolphins 10–0. **Drive: 12 plays, 40 yards, 8:01.**

**Second quarter**

- ARI – Michael Wilson 6-yard pass from Kyler Murray (Chad Ryland kick), 11:28. Dolphins 10–7. **Drive: 9 plays, 70 yards, 4:48.**
- MIA – Jason Sanders 25-yard field goal, 0:15. Dolphins 13–7. **Drive: 13 plays, 88 yards, 3:27.**

**Third quarter**

- ARI – Chad Ryland 57-yard field goal, 11:43. Dolphins 13–10. **Drive: 5 plays, 32 yards, 3:17.**
- MIA – De'Von Achane 12-yard pass from Tua Tagovailoa (Jason Sanders kick), 8:31. Dolphins 20–10. **Drive: 6 plays, 70 yards, 3:12.**
- ARI – Tua Tagovailoa fumble out of bounds in the end zone for a safety, 6:15. Dolphins 20–12.
- ARI – Marvin Harrison Jr. 22-yard pass from Kyler Murray (run failed), 2:08. Dolphins 20–18. **Drive: 9 plays, 75 yards, 4:07.**

**Fourth quarter**

- MIA – Raheem Mostert 6-yard run (Jason Sanders kick), 12:22. Dolphins 27–18. **Drive: 9 plays, 70 yards, 4:46.**
- ARI – James Conner 2-yard run (Chad Ryland kick), 8:47. Dolphins 27–25. **Drive: 8 plays, 70 yards, 3:35.**
- ARI – Chad Ryland 34-yard field goal, 0:00. Cardinals 28–27. **Drive: 13 plays, 73 yards, 5:01.**

**Top passers**

- ARI – Kyler Murray – 26/36, 307 yards, 2 TD
- MIA – Tua Tagovailoa – 28/38, 234 yards, TD

**Top rushers**

- ARI – James Conner – 20 rushes, 53 yards, TD
- MIA – De'Von Achane – 10 rushes, 97 yards

**Top receivers**

- ARI – Trey McBride – 9 receptions, 124 yards
- MIA – Tyreek Hill – 6 receptions, 72 yards

The Cardinals defeated the Dolphins on a walk-off field goal by Chad Ryland as time expired. It was the first time they had beaten the Dolphins in Miami since 2004.

==== Week 9: vs. Chicago Bears ====
Week 9: Chicago Bears at Arizona Cardinals – Game summary

Quarter	1	2	3	4	Total
Bears	0	9	0	0	**9**
**Cardinals**	7	14	3	5	**29**

at State Farm Stadium, Glendale, Arizona

- Date: November 3
- Game time: 2:05 p.m. MST
- Game weather: Sunny, 71 °F (22 °C) (retractable roof open)
- Game attendance: 64,609
- Referee: Carl Cheffers
- TV announcers (CBS): Ian Eagle, Charles Davis and Evan Washburn
- Recap, Game Book

Game information

**First quarter**

- ARI – Trey McBride 2-yard run (Chad Ryland kick), 0:46. Cardinals 7–0. **Drive: 5 plays, 41 yards, 2:37.**

**Second quarter**

- CHI – Cairo Santos 29-yard field goal, 11:51. Cardinals 7–3. **Drive: 11 plays, 69 yards, 3:55.**
- CHI – Cairo Santos 53-yard field goal, 9:10. Cardinals 7–6. **Drive: 6 plays, 11 yards, 1:52.**
- ARI – Trey Benson 1-yard run (Chad Ryland kick), 3:14. Cardinals 14–6. **Drive: 12 plays, 70 yards, 5:56.**
- CHI – Cairo Santos 53-yard field goal, 0:26. Cardinals 14–9. **Drive: 10 plays, 35 yards, 2:48.**
- ARI – Emari Demercado 53-yard run (Chad Ryland kick), 0:04. Cardinals 21–9. **Drive: 4 plays, 70 yards, 0:22.**

**Third quarter**

- ARI – Chad Ryland 29-yard field goal, 4:53. Cardinals 24–9. **Drive: 13 plays, 69 yards, 7:54.**

**Fourth quarter**

- ARI – Chad Ryland 55-yard field goal, 14:02. Cardinals 27–9. **Drive: 4 plays, 3 yards, 0:53.**
- ARI – Penalty on D'Andre Swift enforced in the end zone for a safety, 7:58. Cardinals 29–9.

**Top passers**

- CHI – Caleb Williams – 22/41, 216 yards
- ARI – Kyler Murray – 13/20, 154 yards

**Top rushers**

- CHI – D'Andre Swift – 16 rushes, 51 yards
- ARI – James Conner – 18 rushes, 107 yards

**Top receivers**

- CHI – Rome Odunze – 5 receptions, 104 yards
- ARI – Trey McBride – 3 receptions, 35 yards

With the win, Arizona improved to 5–4, exceeding their four-win total from 2022 and 2023. During the second quarter, the retractable roof at State Farm Stadium had to be closed due to a hail storm. This was the first time the Cardinals had beaten the Bears at home since 1998.

==== Week 10: vs. New York Jets ====
Week 10: New York Jets at Arizona Cardinals – Game summary

Quarter	1	2	3	4	Total
Jets	3	3	0	0	**6**
**Cardinals**	14	10	7	0	**31**

at State Farm Stadium, Glendale, Arizona

- Date: November 10
- Game time: 2:25 p.m. MST
- Game weather: Sunny, 79 °F (26 °C) (retractable roof open)
- Game attendance: 64,030
- Referee: John Hussey
- TV announcers (CBS): Spero Dedes, Adam Archuleta and Aditi Kinkhabwala
- Recap, Game Book

Game information

**First quarter**

- ARI – James Conner 1-yard run (Chad Ryland kick), 12:58. Cardinals 7–0. **Drive: 6 plays, 70 yards, 2:02.**
- NYJ – Spencer Shrader 25-yard field goal, 7:48. Cardinals 7–3. **Drive: 11 plays, 63 yards, 5:10.**
- ARI – Kyler Murray 1-yard run (Chad Ryland kick), 2:54. Cardinals 14–3. **Drive: 9 plays, 70 yards, 4:54.**

**Second quarter**

- NYJ – Spencer Shrader 45-yard field goal, 11:37. Cardinals 14–6. **Drive: 12 plays, 43 yards, 6:17.**
- ARI – Marvin Harrison Jr. 9-yard pass from Kyler Murray (Chad Ryland kick), 5:44. Cardinals 21–6. **Drive: 10 plays, 70 yards, 5:53.**
- ARI – Chad Ryland 37-yard field goal, 0:00. Cardinals 24–6. **Drive: 10 plays, 49 yards, 4:09.**

**Third quarter**

- ARI – Kyler Murray 12-yard run (Chad Ryland kick), 4:13. Cardinals 31–6. **Drive: 10 plays, 88 yards, 6:20.**

**Fourth quarter**

- No scoring plays.

**Top passers**

- NYJ – Aaron Rodgers – 22/35, 151 yards
- ARI – Kyler Murray – 22/24, 266 yards, TD

**Top rushers**

- NYJ – Breece Hall – 10 rushes, 52 yards
- ARI – Trey Benson – 10 rushes, 62 yards

**Top receivers**

- NYJ – Garrett Wilson – 5 receptions, 41 yards
- ARI – James Conner – 5 receptions, 80 yards

The Cardinals crushed the Jets 31–6 and won their 3rd consecutive game over New York since 2016.

==== Week 12: at Seattle Seahawks ====
Week 12: Arizona Cardinals at Seattle Seahawks – Game summary

Quarter	1	2	3	4	Total
Cardinals	0	3	0	3	**6**
**Seahawks**	0	7	6	3	**16**

at Lumen Field, Seattle, Washington

- Date: November 24
- Game time: 2:25 p.m. MST/1:25 p.m. PST
- Game weather: Cloudy, 45 °F (7 °C)
- Game attendance: 68,649
- Referee: Scott Novak
- TV announcers (Fox): Adam Amin, Mark Sanchez and Kristina Pink
- Recap, Game Book

Game information

**First quarter**

- No scoring plays.

**Second quarter**

- ARI – Chad Ryland 35-yard field goal, 9:43. Cardinals 3–0. **Drive: 6 plays, 33 yards, 2:55.**
- SEA – Jaxon Smith-Njigba 3-yard pass from Geno Smith (Jason Myers kick), 1:14. Seahawks 7–3. **Drive: 7 plays, 61 yards, 3:25.**

**Third quarter**

- SEA – Coby Bryant 69-yard interception return (kick failed, wide left), 7:12. Seahawks 13–3.

**Fourth quarter**

- ARI – Chad Ryland 22-yard field goal, 10:08. Seahawks 13–6. **Drive: 11 plays, 76 yards, 4:43.**
- SEA – Jason Myers 50-yard field goal, 1:56. Seahawks 16–6. **Drive: 13 plays, 49 yards, 8:12.**

**Top passers**

- ARI – Kyler Murray – 24/37, 285 yards, INT
- SEA – Geno Smith – 22/31, 254 yards, TD, INT

**Top rushers**

- ARI – Trey Benson – 4 rushes, 18 yards
- SEA – Kenneth Walker III – 16 rushes, 41 yards

**Top receivers**

- ARI – Trey McBride – 12 receptions, 133 yards
- SEA – Jaxon Smith-Njigba – 6 receptions, 77 yards, TD

The Cardinals lost their 5th straight game against the Seahawks.

==== Week 13: at Minnesota Vikings ====
Week 13: Arizona Cardinals at Minnesota Vikings – Game summary

Quarter	1	2	3	4	Total
Cardinals	3	6	10	3	**22**
**Vikings**	3	3	7	10	**23**

at U.S. Bank Stadium, Minneapolis, Minnesota

- Date: December 1
- Game time: 12:00 p.m. CST/11:00 a.m. MST
- Game weather: None (indoor stadium)
- Game attendance: 66,873
- Referee: Bill Vinovich
- TV announcers (Fox): Joe Davis, Greg Olsen and Pam Oliver
- Recap, Game Book

Game information

**First quarter**

- ARI – Chad Ryland 32-yard field goal, 9:02. Cardinals 3–0. **Drive: 11 plays, 57 yards, 5:58.**
- MIN – John Parker Romo 44-yard field goal, 4:42. Tied 3–3. **Drive: 9 plays, 44 yards, 4:20.**

**Second quarter**

- ARI – Chad Ryland 31-yard field goal, 6:01. Cardinals 6–3. **Drive: 11 plays, 71 yards, 6:09.**
- MIN – John Parker Romo 55-yard field goal, 1:12. Tied 6–6. **Drive: 9 plays, 33 yards, 4:49.**
- ARI – Chad Ryland 24-yard field goal, 0:00. Cardinals 9–6. **Drive: 12 plays, 64 yards, 1:12.**

**Third quarter**

- ARI – Chad Ryland 40-yard field goal, 8:33. Cardinals 12–6. **Drive: 10 plays, 45 yards, 4:55.**
- ARI – Marvin Harrison Jr. 15-yard pass from Kyler Murray (Chad Ryland kick), 4:37. Cardinals 19–6. **Drive: 5 plays, 73 yards, 2:22.**
- MIN – Johnny Mundt 4-yard pass from Sam Darnold (John Parker Romo kick), 1:17. Cardinals 19–13. **Drive: 6 plays, 70 yards, 3:20.**

**Fourth quarter**

- MIN – John Parker Romo 31-yard field goal, 11:08. Cardinals 19–16. **Drive: 9 plays, 55 yards, 3:39.**
- ARI – Chad Ryland 23-yard field goal, 3:20. Cardinals 22–16. **Drive: 16 plays, 66 yards, 7:48.**
- MIN – Aaron Jones 5-yard pass from Sam Darnold (John Parker Romo kick), 1:13. Vikings 23–22. **Drive: 8 plays, 70 yards, 2:07.**

**Top passers**

- ARI – Kyler Murray – 31/45, 260 yards, TD, 2 INT
- MIN – Sam Darnold – 21/31, 235 yards, 2 TD

**Top rushers**

- ARI – James Conner – 17 rushes, 68 yards
- MIN – Aaron Jones – 5 rushes, 22 yards
- MIN – Sam Darnold – 4 rushes, 22 yards
- MIN – Cam Akers – 4 rushes, 22 yards

**Top receivers**

- ARI – Trey McBride – 12 receptions, 96 yards
- MIN – Justin Jefferson – 7 receptions, 99 yards

The Cardinals choked away a 19–6 lead and lost on the road to the Vikings 23–22. The Cardinals lost in Minnesota for the 12th straight time and have not won there since 1977.

==== Week 14: vs. Seattle Seahawks ====
Week 14: Seattle Seahawks at Arizona Cardinals – Game summary

Quarter	1	2	3	4	Total
**Seahawks**	17	7	3	3	**30**
Cardinals	7	3	8	0	**18**

at State Farm Stadium, Glendale, Arizona

- Date: December 8
- Game time: 2:05 p.m. MST
- Game weather: Sunny, 71 °F (22 °C) (retractable roof open)
- Game attendance: 64,533
- Referee: Clay Martin
- TV announcers (CBS): Ian Eagle, Charles Davis and Evan Washburn
- Recap, Game Book

Game information

**First quarter**

- ARI – Michael Wilson 41-yard pass from Kyler Murray (Chad Ryland kick), 11:53. Cardinals 7–0. **Drive: 6 plays, 70 yards, 3:07.**
- SEA – Jason Myers 20-yard field goal, 4:41. Cardinals 7–3. **Drive: 13 plays, 71 yards, 7:12.**
- SEA – Jaxon Smith-Njigba 19-yard pass from Geno Smith (Jason Myers kick), 3:25. Seahawks 10–7. **Drive: 1 play, 19 yards, 0:06.**
- SEA – Zach Charbonnet 1-yard run (Jason Myers kick), 0:16. Seahawks 17–7. **Drive: 5 plays, 46 yards, 2:28.**

**Second quarter**

- ARI – Chad Ryland 28-yard field goal, 10:53. Seahawks 17–10. **Drive: 10 plays, 61 yards, 4:23.**
- SEA – Zach Charbonnet 51-yard run (Jason Myers kick), 2:36. Seahawks 24–10. **Drive: 5 plays, 80 yards, 3:15.**

**Third quarter**

- SEA – Jason Myers 36-yard field goal, 5:29. Seahawks 27–10. **Drive: 10 plays, 45 yards, 5:30.**
- ARI – James Conner 2-yard pass from Kyler Murray (Kyler Murray run), 1:05. Seahawks 27–18. **Drive: 12 plays, 70 yards, 4:24.**

**Fourth quarter**

- SEA – Jason Myers 35-yard field goal, 1:56. Seahawks 30–18. **Drive: 12 plays, 53 yards, 5:20.**

**Top passers**

- SEA – Geno Smith – 24/30, 233 yards, TD
- ARI – Kyler Murray – 25/38, 259 yards, 2 TD, 2 INT

**Top rushers**

- SEA – Zach Charbonnet – 22 rushes, 134 yards, 2 TD
- ARI – James Conner – 18 rushes, 90 yards

**Top receivers**

- SEA – Jaxon Smith-Njigba – 5 receptions, 82 yards, TD
- ARI – Trey McBride – 7 receptions, 70 yards

With the loss, the Cardinals fell to 6–7. They were swept by the Seahawks for the third straight year and suffered their fourth straight home loss to that same team, having last beat the Seahawks at home in 2020.

==== Week 15: vs. New England Patriots ====
Week 15: New England Patriots at Arizona Cardinals – Game summary

Quarter	1	2	3	4	Total
Patriots	0	3	0	14	**17**
**Cardinals**	10	3	3	14	**30**

at State Farm Stadium, Glendale, Arizona

- Date: December 15
- Game time: 2:25 p.m. MST
- Game weather: Sunny, 68 °F (20 °C) (retractable roof open)
- Game attendance: 64,135
- Referee: Ronald Torbert
- TV announcers (CBS): Tom McCarthy, Jay Feely, Ross Tucker and Amanda Balionis
- Recap, Game Book

Game information

**First quarter**

- ARI – Chad Ryland 49-yard field goal, 7:13. Cardinals 3–0. **Drive: 6 plays, 26 yards, 3:26.**
- ARI – Jonah Williams fumble recovery in the endzone (Chad Ryland kick), 1:21. Cardinals 10–0. **Drive: 6 plays, 80 yards, 3:37.**

**Second quarter**

- NE – Joey Slye 50-yard field goal, 2:01. Cardinals 10–3. **Drive: 12 plays, 48 yards, 7:30.**
- ARI – Chad Ryland 35-yard field goal, 0:16. Cardinals 13–3. **Drive: 10 plays, 53 yards, 1:45.**

**Third quarter**

- ARI – Chad Ryland 40-yard field goal, 9:07. Cardinals 16–3. **Drive: 10 plays, 49 yards, 5:53.**

**Fourth quarter**

- ARI – James Conner 1-yard run (Chad Ryland kick), 10:39. Cardinals 23–3. **Drive: 9 plays, 55 yards, 4:52.**
- NE – Demario Douglas 3-yard pass from Drake Maye (Joey Slye kick), 8:14. Cardinals 23–10. **Drive: 6 plays, 75 yards, 2:25.**
- ARI – James Conner 1-yard run (Chad Ryland kick), 3:27. Cardinals 30–10. **Drive: 9 plays, 70 yards, 4:47.**
- NE – Drake Maye 5-yard run (Joey Slye kick), 1:55. Cardinals 30–17. **Drive: 6 plays, 70 yards, 1:32.**

**Top passers**

- NE – Drake Maye – 19/23, 202 yards, TD, INT
- ARI – Kyler Murray – 23/30, 224 yards

**Top rushers**

- NE – Rhamondre Stevenson – 13 rushes, 69 yards
- ARI – James Conner – 16 rushes, 110 yards, 2 TD

**Top receivers**

- NE – Kendrick Bourne – 3 receptions, 44 yards
- ARI – Trey McBride – 9 receptions, 87 yards

With this win, the Cardinals improved to 7–7 and also defeated New England for the first time since 2012.

==== Week 16: at Carolina Panthers ====
Week 16: Arizona Cardinals at Carolina Panthers – Game summary

Quarter	1	2	3	4	OT	Total
Cardinals	0	17	3	10	0	**30**
**Panthers**	7	13	3	7	6	**36**

at Bank of America Stadium, Charlotte, North Carolina

- Date: December 22
- Game time: 1:00 p.m. EST/11:00 a.m. MST
- Game weather: Sunny, 37 °F (3 °C)
- Game attendance: 68,804
- Referee: Adrian Hill
- TV announcers (Fox): Chris Myers, Mark Schlereth and Jen Hale
- Recap, Game Book

Game information

**First quarter**

- CAR – Chuba Hubbard 4-yard run (Eddy Piñeiro kick), 4:55. Panthers 7–0. **Drive: 15 plays, 70 yards, 7:58.**

**Second quarter**

- ARI – Chad Ryland 48-yard field goal, 14:37. Panthers 7–3. **Drive: 8 plays, 55 yards, 5:18.**
- CAR – Bryce Young 23-yard run (kick failed, wide left), 11:35. Panthers 13–3. **Drive: 6 plays, 70 yards, 3:02.**
- CAR – Adam Thielen 8-yard pass from Bryce Young (Eddy Piñeiro kick), 7:55. Panthers 20–3. **Drive: 4 plays, 30 yards, 1:24.**
- ARI – James Conner 6-yard run (Chad Ryland kick), 5:57. Panthers 20–10. **Drive: 4 plays, 70 yards, 1:58.**
- ARI – DeeJay Dallas 1-yard pass from Kyler Murray (Chad Ryland kick), 0:07. Panthers 20–17. **Drive: 9 plays, 68 yards, 4:13.**

**Third quarter**

- CAR – Eddy Piñeiro 29-yard field goal, 9:31. Panthers 23–17. **Drive: 11 plays, 55 yards, 5:29.**
- ARI – Chad Ryland 30-yard field goal, 5:00. Panthers 23–20. **Drive: 9 plays, 58 yards, 4:31.**

**Fourth quarter**

- CAR – David Moore 18-yard pass from Bryce Young (Eddy Piñeiro kick), 12:04. Panthers 30–20. **Drive: 6 plays, 58 yards, 2:59.**
- ARI – Kyler Murray 20-yard run (Chad Ryland kick), 6:56. Panthers 30–27. **Drive: 9 plays, 70 yards, 5:08.**
- ARI – Chad Ryland 58-yard field goal, 0:00. Tied 30–30. **Drive: 7 plays, 35 yards, 1:47.**

**Overtime**

- CAR – Chuba Hubbard 21-yard run, 3:18. Panthers 36–30. **Drive: 2 plays, 49 yards, 0:53.**

**Top passers**

- ARI – Kyler Murray – 20/32, 202 yards, TD, INT
- CAR – Bryce Young – 17/26, 158 yards, 2 TD

**Top rushers**

- ARI – James Conner – 15 rushes, 117 yards, TD
- CAR – Chuba Hubbard – 25 rushes, 152 yards, 2 TD

**Top receivers**

- ARI – James Conner – 4 receptions, 49 yards
- CAR – Adam Thielen – 5 receptions, 43 yards, TD

With the loss, the Cardinals fell to 7–8 and were eliminated from playoff contention.

==== Week 17: at Los Angeles Rams ====
Week 17: Arizona Cardinals at Los Angeles Rams – Game summary

Quarter	1	2	3	4	Total
Cardinals	0	0	6	3	**9**
**Rams**	0	10	0	3	**13**

at SoFi Stadium, Inglewood, California

- Date: December 28
- Game time: 6:00 p.m. MST/5:00 p.m. PST
- Game weather: Cloudy, 57 °F (14 °C) (fixed roof)
- Game attendance: 73,051
- Referee: Brad Rogers
- TV announcers (KPNX/NFLN): Rich Eisen, Kurt Warner and Jamie Erdahl
  Game exclusive to KPNX through syndication. Out of market on the NFL Network.
- Recap, Game Book

Game information

**First quarter**

- No scoring plays.

**Second quarter**

- LAR – Kyren Williams 1-yard run (Joshua Karty kick), 3:23. Rams 7–0. **Drive: 9 plays, 60 yards, 3:12.**
- LAR – Joshua Karty 53-yard field goal, 0:27. Rams 10–0. **Drive: 8 plays, 42 yards, 1:14.**

**Third quarter**

- ARI – Trey McBride 1-yard pass from Kyler Murray (kick blocked), 8:31. Rams 10–6. **Drive: 13 plays, 68 yards, 6:29.**

**Fourth quarter**

- ARI – Chad Ryland 28-yard field goal, 14:00. Rams 10–9. **Drive: 14 plays, 80 yards, 7:19.**
- LAR – Joshua Karty 25-yard field goal, 6:33. Rams 13–9. **Drive: 13 plays, 60 yards, 7:27.**

**Top passers**

- ARI – Kyler Murray – 33/48, 321 yards, TD, 2 INT
- LAR – Matthew Stafford – 17/32, 189 yards

**Top rushers**

- ARI – Michael Carter – 13 rushes, 70 yards
- LAR – Kyren Williams – 13 rushes, 56 yards, TD

**Top receivers**

- ARI – Trey McBride – 12 receptions, 123 yards, TD
- LAR – Puka Nacua – 10 receptions, 129 yards

==== Week 18: vs. San Francisco 49ers ====
Week 18: San Francisco 49ers at Arizona Cardinals – Game summary

Quarter	1	2	3	4	Total
49ers	3	14	7	0	**24**
**Cardinals**	3	17	6	21	**47**

at State Farm Stadium, Glendale, Arizona

- Date: January 5
- Game time: 2:25 p.m. MST
- Game weather: Sunny, 68 °F (20 °C) (retractable roof open)
- Game attendance: 63,849
- Referee: Shawn Smith
- TV announcers (Fox): Chris Myers, Mark Schlereth and Jen Hale
- Recap, Game Book

Game information

**First quarter**

- SF – Jake Moody 51-yard field goal, 12:48. 49ers 3–0. **Drive: 6 plays, 37 yards, 2:12.**
- ARI – Chad Ryland 51-yard field goal, 0:56. Tied 3–3. **Drive: 8 plays, 30 yards, 2:45.**

**Second quarter**

- ARI – Greg Dortch 23-yard pass from Kyler Murray (Chad Ryland kick), 12:55. Cardinals 10–3. **Drive: 7 plays, 45 yards, 2:16.**
- SF – Joshua Dobbs 1-yard run (Jake Moody kick), 5:43. Tied 10–10. **Drive: 8 plays, 74 yards, 4:10.**
- ARI – Trey McBride 2-yard pass from Kyler Murray (Chad Ryland kick), 1:51. Cardinals 17–10. **Drive: 8 plays, 70 yards, 3:52.**
- SF – Ricky Pearsall 6-yard pass from Joshua Dobbs (Jake Moody kick), 0:16. Tied 17–17. **Drive: 10 plays, 70 yards, 1:35.**
- ARI – Chad Ryland 49-yard field goal, 0:00. Cardinals 20–17. **Drive: 4 plays, 39 yards, 0:16.**

**Third quarter**

- ARI – Greg Dortch 2-yard pass from Kyler Murray (run failed), 8:28. Cardinals 26–17. **Drive: 6 plays, 49 yards, 3:13.**
- SF – Kyle Juszczyk 36-yard pass from Joshua Dobbs (Jake Moody kick), 4:49. Cardinals 26–24. **Drive: 7 plays, 70 yards, 3:39.**

**Fourth quarter**

- ARI – Michael Carter 4-yard run (Chad Ryland kick), 14:16. Cardinals 33–24. **Drive: 10 plays, 70 yards, 5:33.**
- ARI – Marvin Harrison Jr. 12-yard pass from Kyler Murray (Chad Ryland kick), 5:47. Cardinals 40–24. **Drive: 2 plays, 39 yards, 0:51.**
- ARI – Tony Jones Jr. 46-yard run (Chad Ryland kick), 1:47. Cardinals 47–24. **Drive: 5 plays, 57 yards, 2:16.**

**Top passers**

- SF – Joshua Dobbs – 29/43, 326 yards, 2 TD, 2 INT
- ARI – Kyler Murray – 25/35, 242 yards, 4 TD

**Top rushers**

- SF – Patrick Taylor – 17 rushes, 109 yards
- ARI – Tony Jones Jr. – 4 rushes, 55 yards, TD

**Top receivers**

- SF – Ricky Pearsall – 6 receptions, 69 yards, TD
- ARI – Trey McBride – 7 receptions, 65 yards, TD

With this win, the Cardinals swept the 49ers for the first time since 2021. It also marked 600 lifetime victories for the franchise, 593 in the regular season.

=== Standings ===
==== Division ====
NFC West
	W	L	T	PCT	DIV	CONF	PF	PA	STK
^{(4)} Los Angeles Rams	10	7	0	.588	4–2	6–6	367	386	L1
Seattle Seahawks	10	7	0	.588	4–2	6–6	375	368	W2
Arizona Cardinals	8	9	0	.471	3–3	4–8	400	379	W1
San Francisco 49ers	6	11	0	.353	1–5	4–8	389	436	L4

==== Conference ====
NFC
Seed	Team	Division	W	L	T	PCT	DIV	CONF	SOS	SOV	STK
**Division leaders**
1	Detroit Lions	North	15	2	0	.882	6–0	11–1	.516	.494	W3
2	Philadelphia Eagles	East	14	3	0	.824	5–1	9–3	.453	.424	W2
3 (Note: Tampa Bay clinched the #3 seed over Los Angeles based on conference record. (Tampa Bay 8–4 to Los Angeles 6–6))	Tampa Bay Buccaneers	South	10	7	0	.588	4–2	8–4	.502	.465	W2
4 (Note: Los Angeles clinched the NFC West and #4 seed over Seattle based on strength of victory. (Los Angeles .441 to Seattle .424))	Los Angeles Rams	West	10	7	0	.588	4–2	6–6	.505	.441	L1
**Wild cards**
5	Minnesota Vikings	North	14	3	0	.824	4–2	9–3	.474	.408	L1
6	Washington Commanders	East	12	5	0	.706	4–2	9–3	.436	.358	W5
7	Green Bay Packers	North	11	6	0	.647	1–5	6–6	.533	.412	L2
**Did not qualify for the postseason**
8	Seattle Seahawks	West	10	7	0	.588	4–2	6–6	.498	.424	W2
9 (Note: Atlanta finished ahead of Arizona based on conference record. (Atlanta 7–5 to Arizona 4–8))	Atlanta Falcons	South	8	9	0	.471	4–2	7–5	.519	.426	L2
10	Arizona Cardinals	West	8	9	0	.471	3–3	4–8	.536	.404	W1
11	Dallas Cowboys	East	7	10	0	.412	3–3	5–7	.522	.387	L2
12	San Francisco 49ers	West	6	11	0	.353	1–5	4–8	.564	.402	L4
13 (Note: Chicago finished ahead of Carolina based on head-to-head victory.)	Chicago Bears	North	5	12	0	.294	1–5	3–9	.554	.388	W1
14 (Note: Carolina finished ahead of New Orleans based on strength of victory. (Carolina .329 to New Orleans .306))	Carolina Panthers	South	5	12	0	.294	2–4	4–8	.498	.329	W1
15	New Orleans Saints	South	5	12	0	.294	2–4	4–8	.505	.306	L4
16	New York Giants	East	3	14	0	.176	0–6	1–11	.554	.412	L1
**Tiebreakers** (Note: When breaking ties for three or more teams under the NFL's rules, they are first broken within divisions, then comparing only the highest ranked remaining team from each division.)

== Statistics ==
=== Starters ===
Offense

Pos.	Name	GS
QB	Kyler Murray	17
RB	James Conner; Michael Carter; Trey Benson	16; 1; 1
WR	Marvin Harrison Jr; Michael Wilson; Greg Dortch; Zay Jones	16; 13; 4; 2
TE	Trey McBride; Tip Reiman; Elijah Higgins	16; 9; 6
LT	Paris Johnson; Kelvin Beachum	14; 3
LG	Evan Brown	17
C	Hjalte Froholdt	17
RG	Will Hernandez; Trystan Colon; Isaiah Adams	5; 7; 5
RT	Jonah Williams; Kelvin Beachum; Jackson Barton; Christian Jones	6; 8; 2; 1

Defense

Pos.	Name	GS
DE	L.J. Collier	15
DT	Dante Stills	17
NT	Roy Lopez	16
OLB	Zaven Collins	17
ILB	Mack Wilson	16
ILB	Kyzir White	17
LCB	Garrett Williams	11
RCB	Starling Thomas	15
SS	Jalen Thompson	15
FS	Budda Baker	17
Hybrid DB	Sean Murphy-Bunting	15

Special Teams

Pos.	Name	GS
P	Blake Gillikin; Michael Palardy	13; 4
K	Chad Ryland; Matt Prater	13; 4
LS	Aaron Brewer	17

=== Individual leaders ===
Category	Player(s)	Value
Passing yards	Kyler Murray	3,851
Passing touchdowns	Kyler Murray	21
Rushing yards	James Conner	1,094
Rushing touchdowns	James Conner	8
Receptions	Trey McBride	111
Receiving yards	Trey McBride	1,146
Receiving touchdowns	Marvin Harrison Jr	8
Kickoff return yards	DeeJay Dallas	459
Kickoff return touchdowns	DeeJay Dallas	1
Punt return yards	Greg Dortch	202
Tackles	Budda Baker	164
Sacks	Zaven Collins	5.0
Forced fumbles	Zaven Collins; Sean Murphy-Bunting	2
Interceptions	Sean Murphy-Bunting	3
Kicking - field goals	Chad Ryland	28/32, 87.5%
Kicking - extra points	Chad Ryland	26/27, 96.3%

=== Team rankings ===
Category	Value	NFL rank (out of 32)
Passing attempts	543	
Passing completions	374	21st
Passing yards	3,639	18th
Passing touchdowns	21	20th
Interceptions thrown	11	11th
Rushing attempts	463	11th
Rushing yards	2,451	7th
Rushing touchdowns	18	8th
Rushing yards/attempt	5.3	2nd
Total yards of offense	6,090	11th
Points scored	400	12th
Points allowed	379	15th
Passing yards allowed	3,674	14th
Passing touchdowns allowed	20	5th
Rushing attempts against	465	17th
Rushing yards allowed	2,149	20th
Rushing touchdowns allowed	18	18th
Yards/rush attempt allowed	4.6	25th
Interceptions made	9	24th
Fumbles recovered	8	16th
Total yards allowed	5,823	21st

Statistical values are correct through January 5, 2025
