= Trey Benson =

American football player (born 2002)

Arizona Cardinals
- Position: Running back
- Roster status: Injured reserve

Personal information
- Born: July 23, 2002 (age 24); Greenville, Mississippi, U.S.
- Listed height: 6 ft 0 in (1.83 m)
- Listed weight: 225 lb (102 kg)

Career information
- High school: St. Joseph Catholic (Greenville)
- College: Oregon (2020–2021); Florida State (2022–2023)
- NFL draft: 2024: 3rd round, 66th overall pick

Career history
- Arizona Cardinals (2024–2025)

Awards and highlights
- 2× second-team All-ACC (2022, 2023)

Career NFL statistics as of 2025
- Rushing yards: 451
- Rushing touchdowns: 1
- Receptions: 19
- Receiving yards: 123
- Receiving touchdowns: 0
- Stats at Pro Football Reference

Kurtrell "Trey" Benson (born July 23, 2002) is an American professional football running back. He played college football for the Oregon Ducks and Florida State Seminoles and was selected by the Cardinals in the third round of the 2024 NFL draft.

== Early life ==
Benson was born on July 23, 2002, in Greenville, Mississippi. He attended O'Bannon High School before transferring to St. Joseph Catholic High School. In his final two seasons combined, he had 3,616 yards and 48 touchdowns. He committed to the University of Oregon to play college football.

== College career ==
Benson played at Oregon in 2020 and 2021. After missing 2020 due to a torn ACL, he had six carries for 22 yards and a touchdown in 2021. After the season, he transferred to Florida State University. In his first year at Florida State, he initially split time with Lawrance Toafili and Treshaun Ward before eventually becoming the lead back.

=== Statistics ===
Year	Team	Games		Rushing				Receiving				Kick returns			
Year	Team	GP	GS	Att	Yards	Avg	TD	Rec	Yards	Avg	TD	Ret	Yards	Avg	TD
2020	Oregon	Redshirt													
2021	Oregon	10	0	6	22	3.7	1	0	0	0.0	0	0	0	0.0	0
2022	Florida State	13	6	154	990	6.4	9	13	144	11.1	0	5	192	38.4	1
2023	Florida State	13	13	156	906	5.8	14	20	227	11.4	1	1	0	0.0	0
Career		36	19	316	1,918	6.1	24	33	371	11.2	1	6	192	32	1

== Professional career ==
Pre-draft measurables
Height	Weight	Arm length	Hand span	Wingspan	40-yard dash	10-yard split	20-yard split	Vertical jump	Broad jump	Bench press
6 ft 0 1/4 in (1.84 m)	216 lb (98 kg)	31 1/2 in (0.80 m)	9 1/4 in (0.23 m)	6 ft 4 3/8 in (1.94 m)	4.39 s	1.52 s	2.59 s	33.5 in (0.85 m)	10 ft 2 in (3.10 m)	23 reps
All values from NFL Combine/Pro Day

=== 2024 ===
Benson was selected by the Arizona Cardinals in the third round of the 2024 NFL draft with the 66th overall pick. On July 18, 2024, Benson signed his four-year rookie contract with the Cardinals. Benson made his NFL debut in Week 1 of the 2024 NFL season and rushed for 13 yards on three attempts and recorded one reception for five yards. In Week 10 of the 2024 season, Benson rushed for 62 yards on 10 carries and had two receptions for 25 yards in a 31–6 win against the New York Jets. On December 31, Benson was placed on injured reserve with an ankle injury that caused him to miss Weeks 16 and 17. Benson finished the season with 291 yards and a touchdown on 63 carries and 59 yards on six catches.

=== 2025 ===
Benson began the 2025 season as Arizona's second-string running back behind James Conner. After Conner suffered a season-ending injury in Week 3, Benson became the team's primary back. However, Benson suffered a meniscus injury in Week 4 against the Seattle Seahawks, and was ruled out for 4-to-6 weeks after undergoing arthroscopic surgery. On December 10, it was announced that Benson would miss the remainder of the season.

=== 2026 ===
Benson was waived by the Cardinals due to a knee issue on August 24, 2026 and placed on injured reserve the next day.

== NFL career statistics ==
Year	Team	Games		Rushing					Receiving					Fumbles	
Year	Team	GP	GS	Att	Yds	Avg	Lng	TD	Rec	Yds	Avg	Lng	TD	Fum	Lost
2024	ARI	13	1	63	291	4.6	20	1	6	59	9.8	19	0	1	0
2025	ARI	4	1	29	160	5.5	52	0	13	64	4.9	12	0	0	0
Career		17	2	92	451	4.9	52	1	19	123	6.5	19	0	1	0
