= James Conner (American football) =

American football player (born 1995)

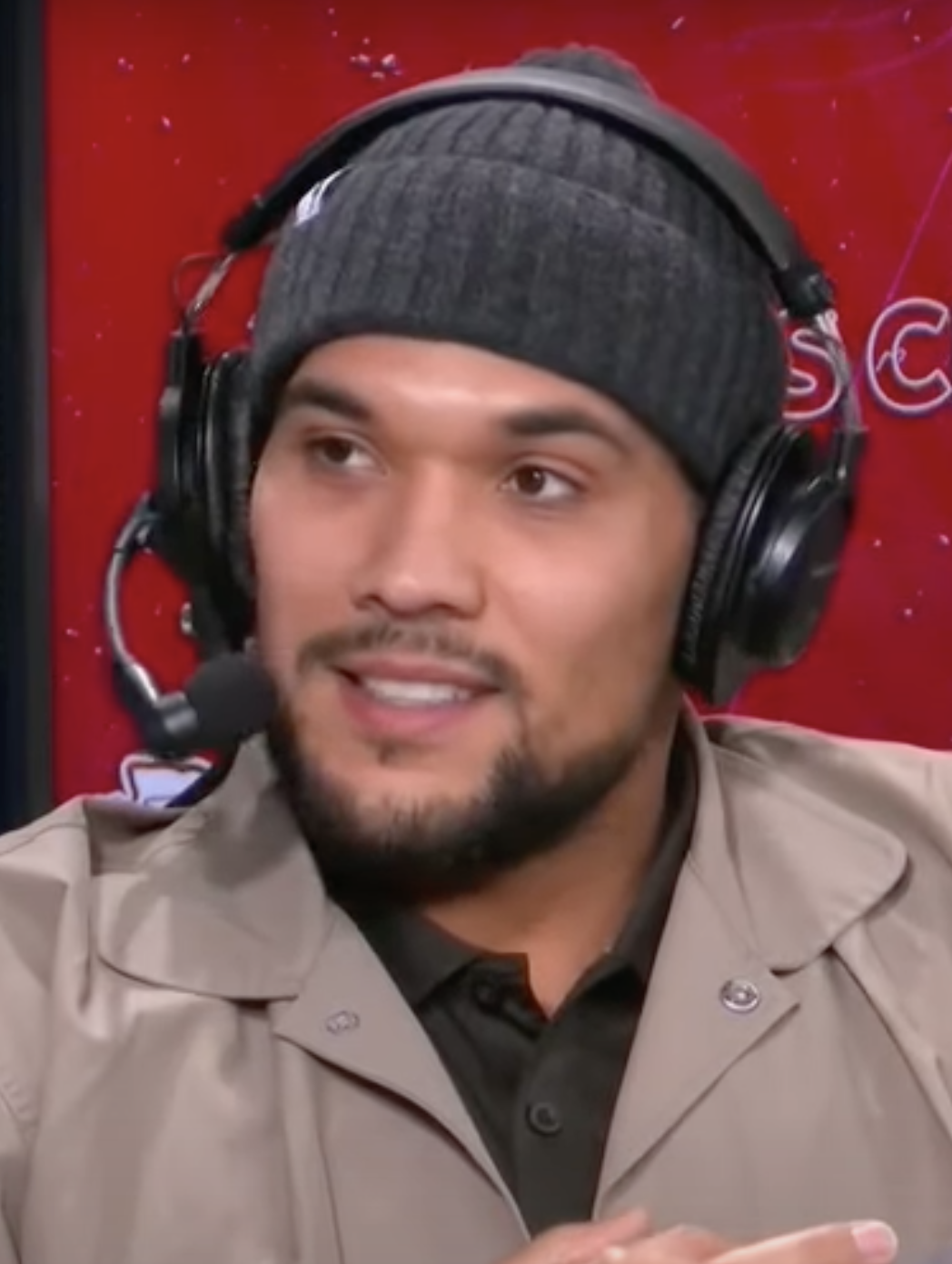
- Conner in 2023

No. 6 – Arizona Cardinals
- Position: Running back
- Roster status: Injured reserve

Personal information
- Born: May 5, 1995 (age 31); Erie, Pennsylvania, U.S.
- Listed height: 6 ft 1 in (1.85 m)
- Listed weight: 233 lb (106 kg)

Career information
- High school: McDowell (Millcreek Township, Pennsylvania)
- College: Pittsburgh (2013–2016)
- NFL draft: 2017: 3rd round, 105th overall pick

Career history
- Pittsburgh Steelers (2017–2020); Arizona Cardinals (2021–present)

Awards and highlights
- 2× Pro Bowl (2018, 2021); Disney Spirit Award (2016); First-team All-American (2014); ACC Player of the Year (2014); ACC Offensive Player of the Year (2014); ACC Brian Piccolo Award (2016); 2× First-team All-ACC (2014, 2016)

Career NFL statistics as of 2025
- Rushing yards: 6,065
- Rushing average: 4.4
- Rushing touchdowns: 60
- Receptions: 289
- Receiving yards: 2,255
- Receiving touchdowns: 12
- Stats at Pro Football Reference

James Earl Conner (born May 5, 1995) is an American professional football running back for the Arizona Cardinals of the National Football League (NFL). He played college football for the Pittsburgh Panthers. In 2014, he garnered AFCA first-team All-American honors and was awarded the ACC Player of the Year. He was selected by the Pittsburgh Steelers in the third round of the 2017 NFL draft.

== Early life ==
Conner attended McDowell High School in Erie, Pennsylvania. He was a running back and defensive lineman on the Trojans football team. As a senior, he rushed for 1,680 yards on 155 carries and 26 touchdowns. He committed to play college football at the University of Pittsburgh in August 2012.

== College career ==
=== 2013 season ===
As a true freshman in 2013, Conner played in 12 of 13 games. He made his collegiate debut during the Panthers' season opening loss to Florida State and had eight carries for 34 yards. The following week, he scored his first career touchdown against New Mexico and finished the win with 12 carries, 119 rushing yards, and a season-high two touchdowns. On December 26, 2013, Conner had a season-high 26 carries for 226 yards and a touchdown during a 30–27 victory over Bowling Green in the Little Caesars Bowl, He was named the 2013 Little Caesars Pizza Bowl MVP. He led the team in rushing yards with 799 and rushing touchdowns with eight. Conner's 229 rushing yards broke Tony Dorsett's school record for rushing yards in a bowl game.

=== 2014 season ===
Conner started his sophomore season rushing for 153 yards on 14 carries and scored a season-high four touchdowns in the season-opening 62–0 win over Delaware. On November 1, 2014, Conner rushed for a career-high 263 rushing yards on a career-high 38 attempts and scored three touchdowns during a 51–48 double-overtime loss to No. 24 Duke. The next game, he passed 200 yards rushing for a second consecutive game with 30 carries for 220 yards and career-high-tying four touchdowns in a loss to North Carolina. In his sophomore season in 2014, Conner rushed for 1,765 yards on 298 attempts and set an Atlantic Coast Conference (ACC) record with 26 rushing touchdowns. He led the ACC in rushing yards and ranked 7th in the Football Bowl Subdivision. At the end of the season, he was named the ACC Player of the Year and garnered American Football Coaches Association first-team All-American honors.

=== 2015 season ===
On September 5, 2015, Conner tore his MCL during the Panthers' season opening 45–37 victory over Youngstown State. He finished the game with eight carries for 77 rushing yards and scored two rushing touchdowns but missed the rest of his junior season. He was also diagnosed with Hodgkin's Lymphoma during the rehab process and was finally cancer-free during the off-season.

Conner was named to the AFCA Good Works Team, which recognizes college football student-athletes for outstanding contributions to their communities.

=== 2016 season ===
Conner played in the Panthers' season-opener against Villanova and finished the victory with 17 carries for 53 yards and a touchdown while also accounting for three receptions for 15 yards and scored his first career touchdown reception. The next game, Conner had 22 attempts for 117 rushing yards and a rushing touchdown in a 42–39 victory over Penn State. He also had four receptions, 29 receiving yards, and a touchdown reception against Penn State. On September 17, 2016, Conner had a season-high 24 carries for 111 rushing yards and a touchdown during a 38–45 loss to Oklahoma State. On October 27, 2016, he had 19 carries, a season-high 141 rushing yards, and three touchdowns in a 36–39 loss to No. 25 Virginia Tech.

On December 10, 2016, Conner announced via Twitter that he intended to apply for early eligibility for the 2017 NFL draft as an underclassman and forgo his senior year at Pitt. Underclassmen had to apply for the draft by January 16, 2017.

== Professional career ==
=== Pre-draft ===
Conner attended the NFL Scouting Combine, but chose to perform only the 40-yard dash, broad jump, vertical jump, and bench press. He completed the three-cone drill, short shuttle, and positional drills at Pitt's Pro Day to finish his combine performance. At the conclusion of the pre-draft process, Conner was projected to be a fifth or sixth round pick by NFL draft scouts and experts. Conner was ranked the 12th best running back available in the draft by Sports Illustrated and the 15th best running back by DraftScout.com.

External videos
- James Conner's NFL Combine Workout
- James Conner runs the 40-yard dash in 4.65s

Pre-draft measurables
Height	Weight	Arm length	Hand span	Wingspan	40-yard dash	10-yard split	20-yard split	20-yard shuttle	Three-cone drill	Vertical jump	Broad jump	Bench press
6 ft 1 1/2 in (1.87 m)	233 lb (106 kg)	31 1/4 in (0.79 m)	9 7/8 in (0.25 m)	6 ft 3 3/8 in (1.91 m)	4.65 s	1.58 s	2.69 s	4.40 s	7.14 s	29 in (0.74 m)	9 ft 5 in (2.87 m)	20 reps
All values from NFL Combine/Pittsburgh's Pro Day

External videos
- Steelers draft James Conner 105th overall

=== Pittsburgh Steelers ===
==== 2017 ====
The Pittsburgh Steelers selected Conner in the third round with the 105th overall pick in the 2017 NFL Draft. Conner was the eighth running back selected in the draft. He had the top selling NFL jersey throughout July, beating all rookies, as well as Marshawn Lynch, Von Miller, Dak Prescott, and Tom Brady.

On May 11, 2017, the Steelers signed Conner to a four-year, $3.16 million contract that includes a signing bonus of $706,288.

Conner entered training camp competing with veterans Knile Davis and Fitzgerald Toussaint for the vacant backup running back position left by DeAngelo Williams. Davis and Toussaint were released during final roster cutdowns, and Steelers head coach Mike Tomlin named Conner the backup to Le'Veon Bell to begin the regular season.

Conner made his NFL debut in the season-opener at the Cleveland Browns and had four carries for 11 yards in a 21–18 victory. In Week 4, he had four carries for a season-high 26 rushing yards in a 26–9 victory at the Baltimore Ravens. On December 19, 2017, he was placed on injured reserve due to an MCL injury that required surgery. Conner finished his rookie season with 144 rushing yards on 32 carries.

==== 2018 ====
Head coach Mike Tomlin named Conner the starting running back to begin the regular season after Le'Veon Bell's decision to indefinitely hold out due to a contract dispute over a long-term deal.

Conner made his first NFL start in the season-opener at the Browns and had 31 carries for 135 rushing yards and two touchdowns in a 21–21 tie. He scored his first NFL touchdown on a 4-yard run in the first quarter and also had five receptions for 47 yards. His 135-yard performance led all players in rushing yards during Week 1. During Week 5 in a 41–17 victory over the Atlanta Falcons, he had 110 rushing yards and two rushing touchdowns to go along with four receptions for 75 yards. In Week 6, a 28–21 victory over the Cincinnati Bengals, Conner had 111 rushing yards and two rushing touchdowns to go along with four receptions for 18 yards. In Week 8, Conner had the best game of his career to date, rushing for 146 yards on 24 carries and two touchdowns as well as five receptions for 66 yards in a 33–18 rout of the Browns. For his efforts, Conner was named the American Football Conference (AFC) Offensive Player of the Week along with AFC Offensive Player of the Month for the month of October. In the following game, against the Ravens, he had 107 rushing yards, 56 receiving yards, and a receiving touchdown in the 23–16 victory. In Week 13, against the Los Angeles Chargers, he suffered a lower leg injury that sidelined him for a few weeks. It was announced on December 18, 2018, that Conner was selected to the 2019 Pro Bowl, his first, and also named the starting running back for the AFC Pro Bowl Team. He returned for the regular season finale against the Cincinnati Bengals. He finished the 2018 season with 973 rushing yards, 12 rushing touchdowns, 55 receptions, 497 receiving yards, and a receiving touchdown. He was ranked 62nd by his fellow players on the NFL Top 100 Players of 2019.

==== 2019 ====
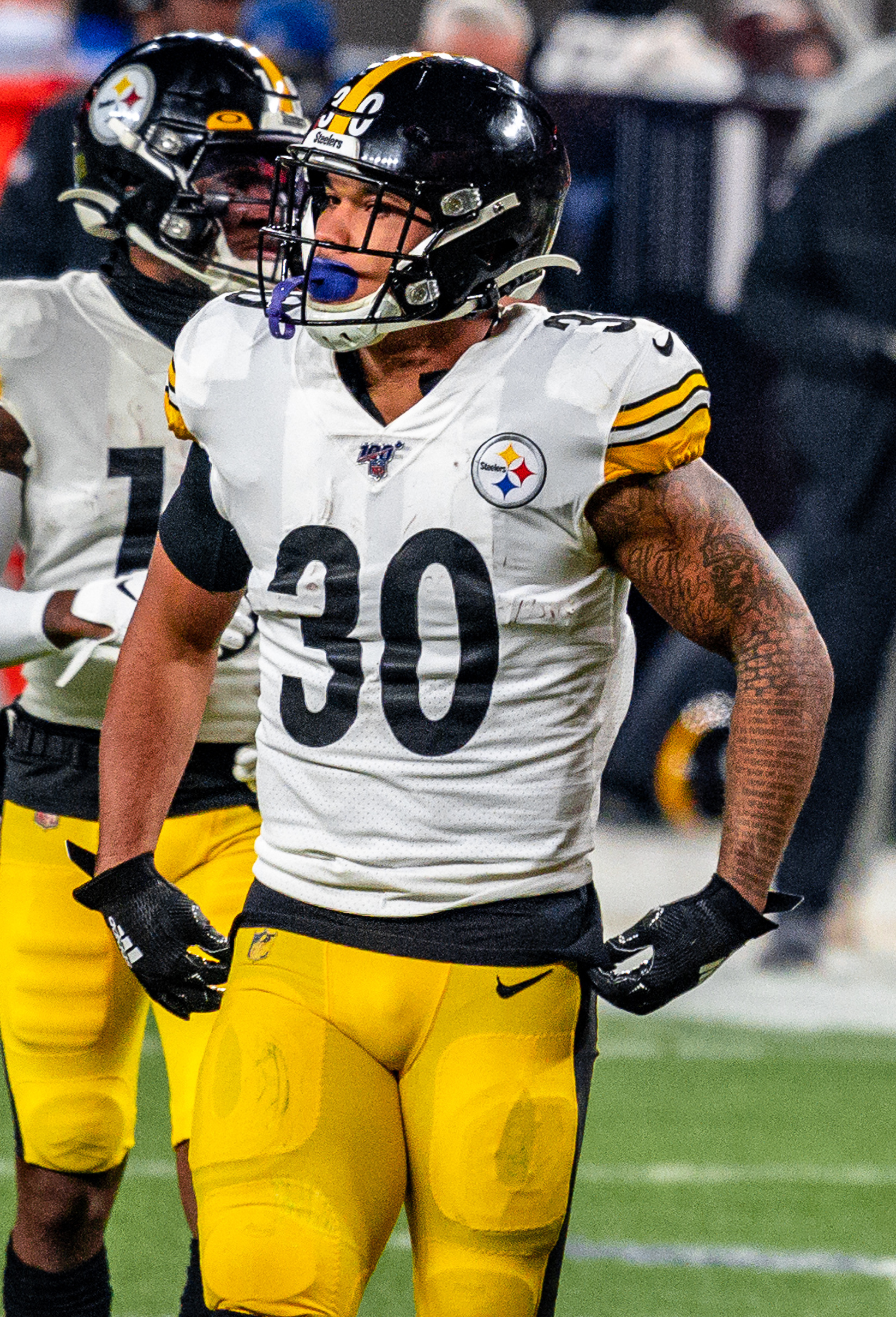
Conner with the Steelers in 2019

In Week 2 against the Seattle Seahawks, Conner injured his knee and exited the game in the third quarter. Prior to being injured, Conner rushed 11 times for 33 yards and his first rushing touchdown of the year. Without Conner, the Steelers lost 26–28. In Week 6 against the Chargers, Conner rushed 16 times for 41 yards and a touchdown and caught seven passes for 78 yards and a touchdown in the 24–17 win. In Week 8 against the Miami Dolphins on Monday Night Football, Conner rushed 23 times for 145 yards and a touchdown before exiting the game with a shoulder injury. Without Conner, the Steelers won 27–14. He was named the AFC Offensive Player of the Week for his performance. Conner made his return from injury in Week 11 against the Browns on Thursday Night Football. In the game, Conner rushed five times for 10 yards and caught one pass for six yards before injuring his shoulder again in the first half. The Steelers eventually lost 21–7 without Conner. Overall, Conner recorded 464 rushing yards and four rushing touchdowns to go along with 34 receptions for 251 receiving yards and three receiving touchdowns.

==== 2020 ====
In Week 1 against the New York Giants on Monday Night Football, Conner rushed six times for nine yards before exiting the game due to an ankle injury. The Steelers won the game 26–16 without Conner in the lineup. Conner bounced back in Week 2 against the Denver Broncos with 106 rushing yards and a rushing touchdown in the 26–21 victory. He recorded 18 carries for 109 rushing yards in the 28–21 victory over the Houston Texans in Week 3. In Week 6 against the Browns, he had 20 carries for 101 rushing yards and one rushing touchdown in the 38–7 victory. On November 28, 2020, Conner was placed on the reserve/COVID-19 list after testing positive for the virus, and activated on December 9. He finished the 2020 season with 169 carries for 721 rushing yards and six rushing touchdowns to go along with 35 receptions for 215 receiving yards.

In the Wild Card Round of the playoffs against the Browns, Conner rushed for 37 yards and a touchdown and caught five passes for 30 yards during the 48–37 loss.

=== Arizona Cardinals ===
==== 2021 ====
On April 13, 2021, Conner signed a one-year deal with the Arizona Cardinals.

In Week 9, Conner led the Cardinals over the San Francisco 49ers with 173 scrimmage yards and three touchdowns. In Week 14, against the Los Angeles Rams, he had 125 scrimmage yards and two rushing touchdowns. He finished the season as the Cardinals leading rusher with 752 yards and finished second in the league with a career-high 15 rushing touchdowns. He was named to the Pro Bowl. He was ranked 80th by his fellow players on the NFL Top 100 Players of 2022.

==== 2022 ====
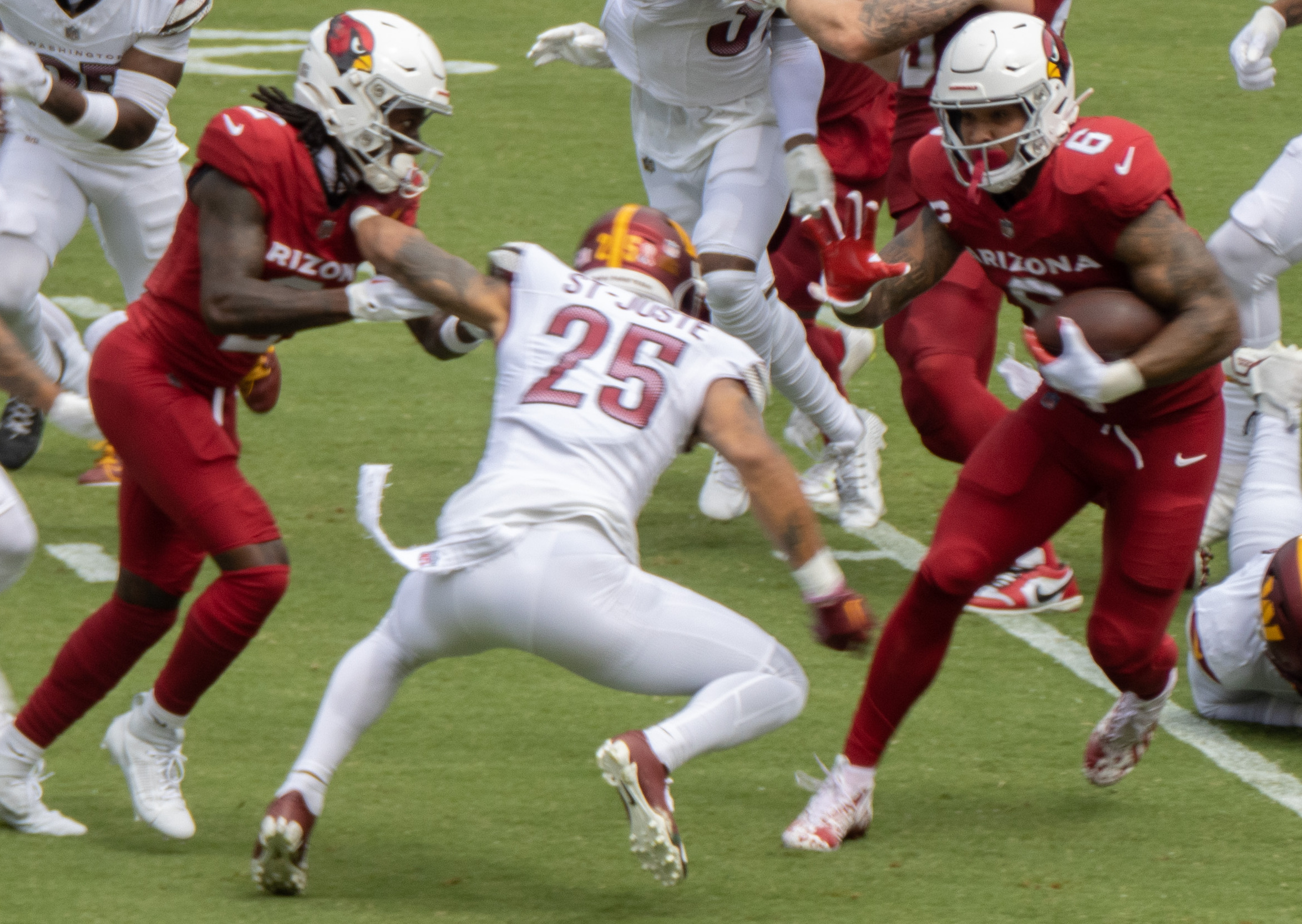
Conner (right) playing for the Cardinals in 2023.

On March 14, 2022, Conner signed a three-year, $21 million contract extension with the Cardinals. In Week 12, against the Chargers, he had 25 carries for 120 rushing yards and one receiving touchdown in the 25–24 loss. In the 2022 season, Conner had 183 carries for 782 rushing yards and seven rushing touchdowns to go along with 46 receptions for 300 receiving yards and one receiving touchdown.

==== 2023 ====
In Week 5, Conner suffered a knee injury and was placed on injured reserve on October 10, 2023. On November 11, the Cardinals reactivated him back on their active roster.

In Week 13, against the Steelers, Conner had 25 carries for 105 yards and two touchdowns in the win. In Week 17, against the Eagles, he had 26 carries for 128 yards, one rushing touchdown, and one receiving touchdown in the win. In Week 18, against the Seattle Seahawks, he had 27 carries for a career-high 150 rushing yards and one touchdown. This performance put him over 1,000 yards for the first time in his career. He finished the 2023 season with 208 carries for 1,040 rushing yards and seven rushing touchdowns to go with 27 receptions for 165 receiving yards and two receiving touchdowns in 13 games and starts.

==== 2024 ====
On November 30, 2024, Conner and the Cardinals agreed to a two–year, $19 million contract extension.

Conner had 21 carries for 122 rushing yards and a touchdown in the 41–10 win over the Rams in Week 2. In Week 7 against the Chargers, he had 152 scrimmage yards in the 17–15 win. In Week 14, he had 122 scrimmage yards and a receiving touchdown in the 30–18 loss to the Seahawks. In Week 15 against the New England Patriots, he had 16 carries for 110 yards and two touchdowns in the 30–17 win. In Week 16, he had 166 scrimmage yards in the 36–30 loss to the Panthers. Conner played a career-high 16 games before he was sidelined with a knee injury in Week 18. He suffered the injury in Week 16's game against the Carolina Panthers in the second quarter and aggravated it in Week 17's game against the Los Angeles Rams, where he left after playing 12 snaps. He finished the season 1,094 rushing yards and eight rushing touchdowns on 236 carries and 414 receiving yards and one receiving touchdown on 47 catches.

==== 2025 ====
Conner began the 2025 season as Arizona's starting running back, and recorded 133 total yards two touchdowns over the team's first three contests. In Week 3 against the San Francisco 49ers, Conner suffered an ankle injury and was replaced by Trey Benson; he was subsequently ruled out for the remainder of the season after undergoing surgery.

==== 2026 ====
On August 30, 2026, Conner was placed on injured reserve due to the previous season's ankle injury.

== Career statistics ==
Legend
**Bold**	Career high

=== NFL ===
==== Regular season ====
Year	Team	Games		Rushing					Receiving					Fumbles	
Year	Team	GP	GS	Att	Yds	Avg	Lng	TD	Rec	Yds	Avg	Lng	TD	Fum	Lost
2017	PIT	14	0	32	144	4.5	23	0	0	0	0.0	0	0	0	0
2018	PIT	13	12	215	973	4.5	30	12	**55**	**497**	9.0	29	1	**4**	**2**
2019	PIT	10	10	116	464	4.0	25	4	34	251	7.4	26T	**3**	1	1
2020	PIT	13	11	169	721	4.3	**59**	6	35	215	6.1	18	0	2	0
2021	ARI	15	6	202	752	3.7	35	**15**	37	375	**10.1**	**45**	**3**	2	0
2022	ARI	13	13	183	782	4.3	23	7	46	300	6.5	22	1	3	1
2023	ARI	13	13	208	1,040	**5.0**	44	7	27	165	6.1	34	2	0	0
2024	ARI	16	16	**236**	**1,094**	4.6	53	8	47	414	8.8	44	1	**4**	1
2025	ARI	3	3	32	95	3.0	12	1	8	38	4.8	18	1	1	0
Career		110	84	1,393	6,065	4.4	59	60	289	2,255	7.8	45	12	17	5

==== Postseason ====
Year	Team	Games		Rushing					Receiving					Fumbles	
Year	Team	GP	GS	Att	Yds	Avg	Lng	TD	Rec	Yds	Avg	Lng	TD	Fum	Lost
2017	PIT	0	0	Did not play due to injury											
2020	PIT	1	1	**11**	**37**	3.4	9	**1**	**5**	**30**	**6.0**	**9**	0	0	0
2021	ARI	1	0	4	19	**4.8**	**11**	**1**	1	5	5.0	5	0	0	0
Career		2	1	15	56	3.7	11	2	6	35	5.8	9	0	0	0

=== College ===
Year	Team	GP	Rushing					Receiving				
Year	Team	GP	Att	Yds	Avg	Lng	TD	Rec	Yds	Avg	Lng	TD
2013	Pittsburgh	12	146	799	5.5	45	8	3	33	11.0	13	0
2014	Pittsburgh	13	**298**	**1,765**	5.9	**75T**	**26**	5	70	14.0	40	0
2015	Pittsburgh	1	8	77	**9.6**	40	2	1	7	7.0	7	0
2016	Pittsburgh	13	216	1,092	5.1	40T	16	**21**	**302**	**14.4**	**55T**	**4**
Career		39	668	3,733	5.6	75T	52	30	412	13.7	55T	4

== Personal life ==
Conner was raised by his parents, Kelly Patterson and Glen Conner Sr. and is the youngest of five brothers. He majored in communication at Pitt. Glen Jr. also plays football, a defensive lineman with his local Erie Express professional team in the Gridiron Developmental Football League (GDFL). On April 22, 2019, the Express honored Glen as their "Defensive Player of the Week" with seven tackles, three tackles for loss (−16 yards), three sacks, and an interception in their 30–6 victory over the Westmoreland Wolves.

On December 4, 2015, Conner announced he was diagnosed with Hodgkin's lymphoma. Despite this, he said "I choose to not fear cancer... I will play football again." After tearing his MCL during the Panthers' first game of 2015, Conner attended rehab and began experiencing excessive fatigue and other symptoms, leading doctors to perform a chest x-ray that revealed Hodgkin's Lymphoma. He endured 12 rounds of chemotherapy and completed his last chemo appointment on May 9, 2016. During his treatment, Conner continued to participate in non-contact drills with the Pittsburgh Panthers football team as much as his body would allow.

Conner appeared on the April 21, 2016 episode of The Ellen DeGeneres Show and met Kansas City Chiefs' safety Eric Berry, who also overcame Hodgkin's lymphoma and whom Conner saw as an inspirational figure. During Conner's treatment, the two players had spoken via text message but had never met in person.

On May 23, 2016, Conner announced on Twitter that he was cancer free.

During the 2018 season, Conner began growing a mullet, which became popular among Steeler fans and fully embracing the Yinzer culture with the hairstyle. Conner joined many other Pittsburgh natives and/or sports stars that have sported the hairstyle, most prominently former Pittsburgh Penguins superstar Jaromír Jágr.
