= Elijah Higgins =

American football player (born 2000)

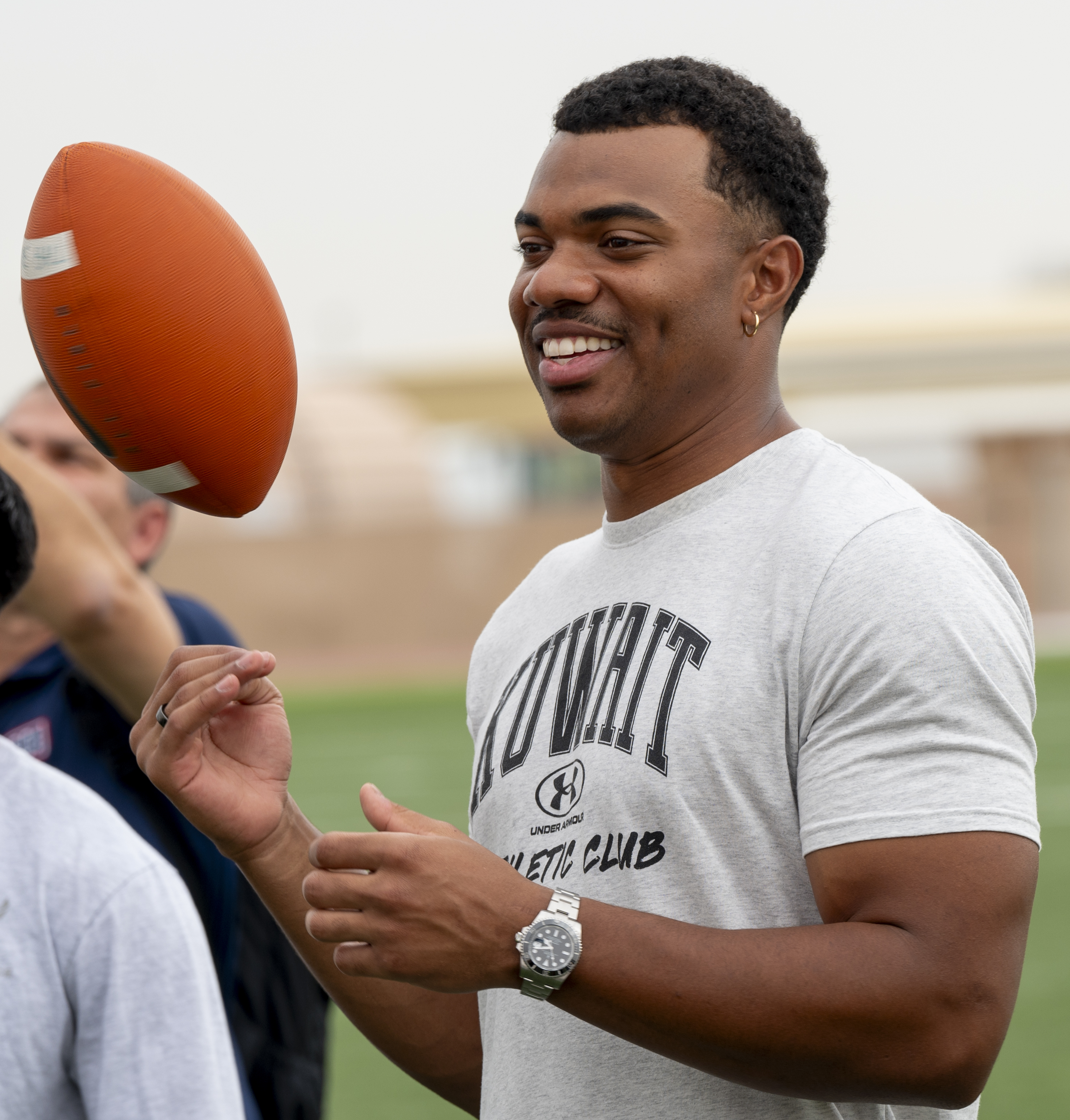
- Higgins in 2025

No. 84 – Arizona Cardinals
- Position: Tight end
- Roster status: Active

Personal information
- Born: October 27, 2000 (age 26); Tampa, Florida, U.S.
- Listed height: 6 ft 3 in (1.91 m)
- Listed weight: 245 lb (111 kg)

Career information
- High school: Bowie (Austin, Texas)
- College: Stanford (2019–2022)
- NFL draft: 2023: 6th round, 197th overall pick

Career history
- Miami Dolphins (2023)*; Arizona Cardinals (2023–present)
- * Offseason or practice squad member only

Career NFL statistics as of Week 9, 2026
- Receptions: 78
- Receiving yards: 798
- Receiving average: 9.8
- Receiving touchdowns: 4
- Stats at Pro Football Reference

Elijah Higgins (born October 27, 2000) is an American professional football tight end for the Arizona Cardinals of the National Football League (NFL). He played college football for the Stanford Cardinal.

== Early life ==
Higgins grew up in Florida and attended Bowie High School in Austin, Texas. He was selected to play in the Under Armour All-America Game during his senior season. Higgins was rated a four-star recruit and committed to play college football at Stanford.

== College career ==
Higgins played in all 12 games as a freshman at Stanford, primarily on special teams. He had 15 receptions for 176 yards in a 5-game schedule during the COVID-19-shortened 2020 season. Higgins led the Cardinal with 45 receptions for 500 yards and four touchdowns during his junior season. He caught 59 passes for 704 yards and two touchdowns as a senior.

== Professional career ==
Pre-draft measurables
Height	Weight	Arm length	Hand span	Wingspan	40-yard dash	10-yard split	20-yard split	20-yard shuttle	Three-cone drill	Vertical jump	Broad jump	Bench press
6 ft 3 in (1.91 m)	235 lb (107 kg)	31 3/4 in (0.81 m)	10 1/2 in (0.27 m)	6 ft 5 3/4 in (1.97 m)	4.54 s	1.56 s	2.61 s	4.50 s	7.01 s	35.0 in (0.89 m)	10 ft 6 in (3.20 m)	17 reps
All values from NFL Combine/Pro Day

=== Miami Dolphins ===
Higgins was selected by the Miami Dolphins in the sixth round, 197th overall, of the 2023 NFL draft. He was waived on August 29, 2023.

=== Arizona Cardinals ===
==== 2023 season ====
On August 30, 2023, Higgins was claimed off waivers by the Arizona Cardinals. In his rookie season, he played in 11 games and started 2. He finished the 2023 season with 14 receptions on 19 targets for 163 yards and 1 touchdown.

==== 2024 season ====
Higgins started the 2024 season as the Cardinals' second-string tight end behind Trey McBride. In Week 1 against the Buffalo Bills he caught 2 passes for 12 yards in a 34–28 loss for the Cardinals. In Week 2 against the Los Angeles Rams, Higgins caught one pass for 18 yards and a touchdown in the Cardinals' 41–10 win. In Week 5 he caught one pass for two yards and a touchdown in a 24–23 win against the San Francisco 49ers.

In addition to their roles as tight ends, both Higgins and fellow tight end Tip Reiman would both occasionally play fullback due to the Cardinals not carrying a true one on their roster during the 2024 season.

In the 2024 season Higgins played in 17 games and started 6, playing 411 offensive snaps and 176 special teams snaps. He recorded 20 receptions on 24 targets for 172 yards and 2 touchdowns. Higgins played 278 snaps as a tight end, 35 in the backfield, 73 snaps in the slot, and 25 snaps out wide.

==== 2026 season ====
On November 13, 2026, Higgins signed a three-year contract extension with the Cardinals, keeping him with the team through the 2029 season.

== NFL career statistics ==
Legend
**Bold**	Career high

=== Regular season ===
Year	Team	Games		Receiving						Fumbles	
Year	Team	GP	GS	Tgts	Rec	Yds	Avg	Lng	TD	Fum	Lost
2023	ARI	11	2	19	14	163	**11.6**	26	1	0	0
2024	ARI	**17**	6	24	20	172	8.6	23	**2**	0	0
2025	ARI	**17**	**10**	**37**	**30**	**301**	10.0	**27**	0	**1**	**1**
2026	ARI	9	5	20	18	162	9.0	**38**	1	0	0
Career		54	23	100	82	798	9.8	38	4	1	1

== Personal life ==
Higgins' father played one season of college football at The University of South Florida.
