= Tip Reiman =

American football player (born 2001)

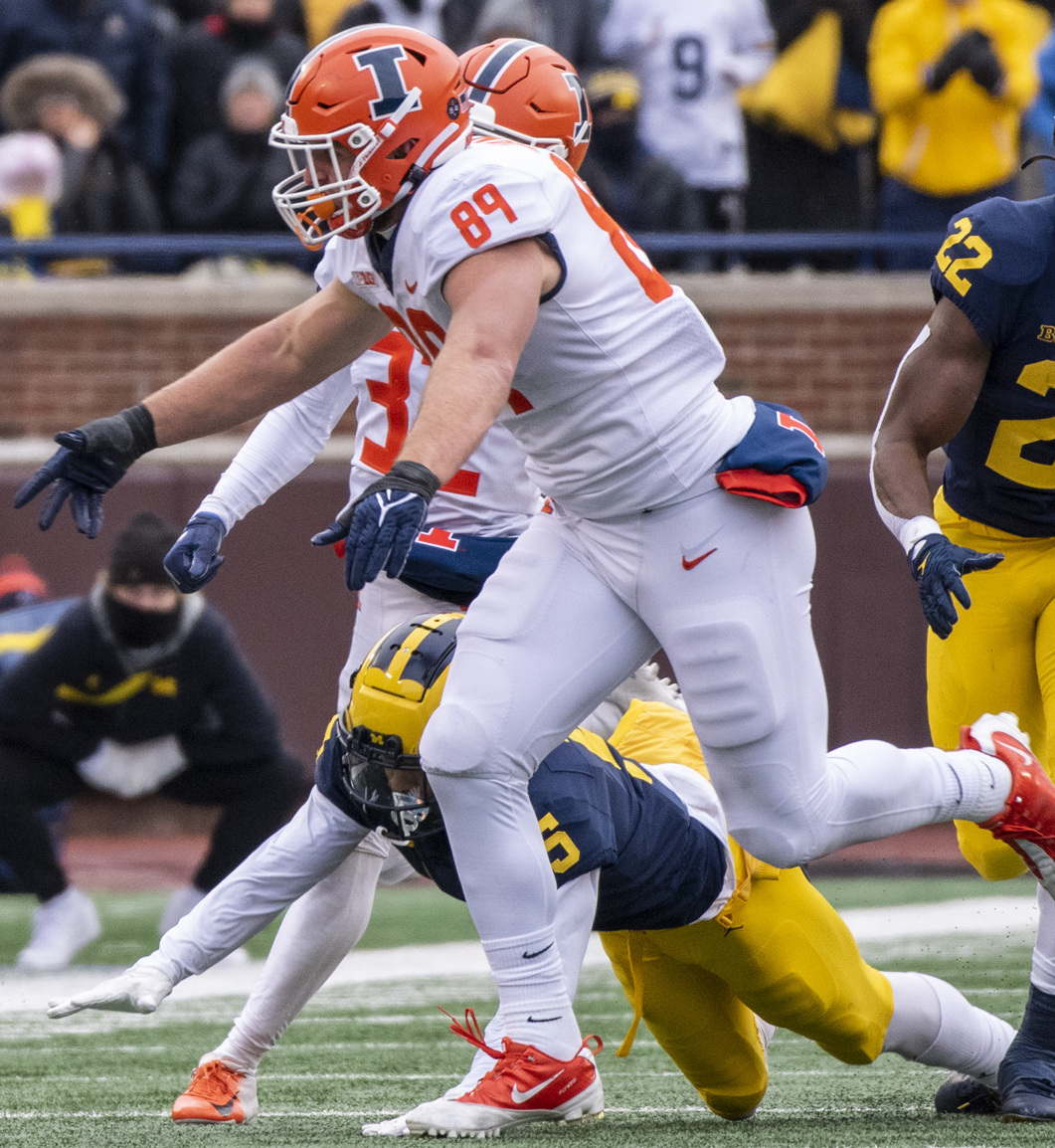
- Reiman with the Illinois Fighting Illini in 2022

No. 87 – Arizona Cardinals
- Position: Tight end
- Roster status: Physically unable to perform

Personal information
- Born: September 17, 2001 (age 25); Rapid City, South Dakota, U.S.
- Listed height: 6 ft 5 in (1.96 m)
- Listed weight: 271 lb (123 kg)

Career information
- High school: O'Gorman (Sioux Falls, South Dakota)
- College: Illinois (2020–2023)
- NFL draft: 2024: 3rd round, 82nd overall pick

Career history
- Arizona Cardinals (2024–present)

Career NFL statistics as of 2025
- Receptions: 9
- Receiving yards: 55
- Stats at Pro Football Reference

Tip Reiman Jr. (born September 17, 2001) is an American professional football tight end for the Arizona Cardinals of the National Football League (NFL). He played college football for the Illinois Fighting Illini and was selected by the Cardinals in the third round of the 2024 NFL draft.

== Early life ==
Reiman was born on September 17, 2001, and grew up in Rapid City, South Dakota. He attended St. Thomas More High School there before transferring as a junior to O'Gorman Catholic High School in Sioux Falls, South Dakota, where he played football as a tight end after having seen action at several positions. As a senior, he helped O'Gorman win the state championship game. He also participated in track and field. Reiman received athletic scholarship offers from the South Dakota Coyotes and South Dakota State Jackrabbits, but opted to walk-on to play for the Illinois Fighting Illini.

== College career ==
As a true freshman at Illinois in 2020, Reiman played all eight games and was mostly used on special teams. He received a scholarship from the school in 2021 and that year played 12 games, three as a starter, recording three receptions for 43 yards. The following year, he recorded 19 receptions for 174 yards and one touchdown while starting all 13 games. He returned for the 2023 season and became team captain; he recorded 19 receptions for 203 yards and three scores while starting all 12 games. Off the field, Reiman was named Academic All-Big Ten Conference each year from 2021 to 2023. Reiman declared for the 2024 NFL draft and was invited to the NFL Scouting Combine.

== Professional career ==
Pre-draft measurables
Height	Weight	Arm length	Hand span	Wingspan	40-yard dash	10-yard split	20-yard split	20-yard shuttle	Three-cone drill	Vertical jump	Broad jump	Bench press
6 ft 4 7/8 in (1.95 m)	271 lb (123 kg)	32 7/8 in (0.84 m)	10 1/2 in (0.27 m)	6 ft 7 1/2 in (2.02 m)	4.64 s	1.55 s	2.69 s	4.26 s	7.02 s	33.5 in (0.85 m)	10 ft 1 in (3.07 m)	28 reps
All values from NFL Combine

=== 2024 season ===
Reiman was selected by the Arizona Cardinals in the third round of the 2024 NFL draft with the 82nd overall pick. He began his rookie season as the Cardinals' third tight end behind starter Trey McBride and second-stringer Elijah Higgins. Reiman made his NFL debut in Week 1 of the 2024 NFL season in a loss to the Buffalo Bills. In his first game, Reiman played 31 total snaps (20 on offense and 11 on special teams). In Week 5 against the San Francisco 49ers, Reiman recorded his first NFL reception for five yards as the Cardinals won 24-23.

In addition to their roles as tight ends, Reiman and fellow tight end Elijah Higgins both occasionally played the position of fullback (with Higgins playing slightly more snaps) as the Arizona Cardinals did not carry an official fullback on their roster.

Reiman played in 17 games and started 9 as a rookie, playing 450 offensive snaps and 189 special teams snaps. He saw extensive usage as a blocker, both in pass protection and as a run blocker and played the second most snaps of any Cardinals tight end aside from starting tight end Trey McBride. Reiman recorded 6 receptions on 7 targets for 37 yards. Reiman played 395 snaps aligned as in-line, 20 snaps in the backfield, 23 in the slot, and 23 snaps out wide.

=== 2025 season ===
Reiman was named the Cardinals' No. 2 tight end behind Trey McBride entering the 2025 NFL season. Reiman played 34 offensive snaps and recorded 1 reception for 10 yards in Week 1 of the 2025 NFL season in a win against the New Orleans Saints. After missing the following game with an injury, Reiman recorded 2 receptions for 8 yards against in a Week 3 loss against the San Francisco 49ers. In Week 5 against the Tennessee Titans, Reiman suffered an ankle injury that caused him to be placed on season-ending injured reserve on October 6, 2025.
