= 2021 New Orleans Saints season =

55th season in franchise history

- Owner: Gayle Benson
- General manager: Mickey Loomis
- Head coach: Sean Payton
- Offensive coordinator: Pete Carmichael Jr.
- Defensive coordinator: Dennis Allen
- Home stadium: Caesars Superdome; TIAA Bank Field (Note: Due to Hurricane Ida, the Saints' Week 1 game vs. the Green Bay Packers was relocated to TIAA Bank Field in Jacksonville, Florida. While Caesars Superdome did not receive any direct damage, power outages were not expected to be resolved within the city of New Orleans by the day of kickoff.)

Results
- Record: 9–8
- Division place: 2nd NFC South
- Playoffs: Did not qualify
- All-Pros: LB Demario Davis (2nd team); ST J. T. Gray (1st team)
- Pro Bowlers: 4: RB Alvin Kamara; DE Cameron Jordan; CB Marshon Lattimore; S J. T. Gray

Uniform
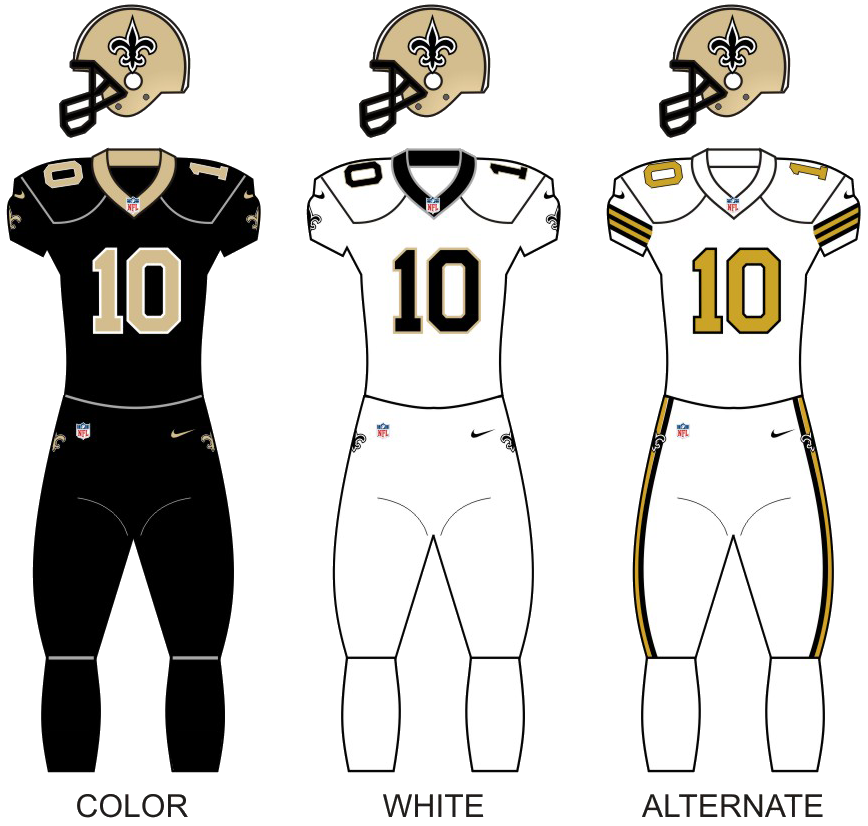

The 2021 season was the New Orleans Saints' 55th season in the National Football League (NFL), the 46th playing home games at Caesars Superdome and the 15th and final season under head coach Sean Payton. After starting the season 5–2, the Saints fell into a five game losing streak after losing starting quarterback Jameis Winston to a torn ACL in Week 8 vs. Winston's former team, the Tampa Bay Buccaneers. They also failed to improve on their 12–4 record from the previous season, as well as failing to win the division title for the first time since 2016. Despite winning four of their last five games, the Saints missed the playoffs for the first time since 2016 after the San Francisco 49ers defeated the Los Angeles Rams in Week 18. The Saints finished tied with the Philadelphia Eagles for the 7th seed in the NFC, but lost the tiebreaker based on the teams' Week 11 head-to-head meeting—won by the Eagles. The team started a record of 58 different players (due to injuries and COVID-19) and ranked in the bottom 5 in total offense.

This was the first season since 2005 without long-time quarterback Drew Brees on the roster. He announced his retirement on March 14, after playing 20 years in the league. A 13-time Pro Bowler, Brees broke several records during his tenure in New Orleans, led the franchise to its first and only Super Bowl win in Super Bowl XLIV and also retired as the league's all-time leader in passing yards, a record that would be broken by quarterback Tom Brady in Week 4 of the 2021 season against his former team, the New England Patriots. Brees was also the last remaining active player from the 2001 draft class.

Despite having three years left in his contract, this was also long-time head coach Sean Payton's final season with the Saints, as he announced his departure from the team on January 25, 2022, after 16 years of coaching the team. In his tenure, Payton led the Saints to nine playoff appearances and to the franchise's first Super Bowl title in Super Bowl XLIV.

== Roster changes ==
=== Free agency ===
==== Unrestricted ====
Position	Player	2021 team	Date signed	Contract
MLB	Alex Anzalone	Detroit Lions	March 24	1 year, $1.75 million
CB	Johnson Bademosi			
FB	Michael Burton	Kansas City Chiefs	April 1	1 year, $990k
CB	Ken Crawley	New Orleans Saints	May 17	1 year, $990k
WR	Bennie Fowler	San Francisco 49ers	May 21	1 year, $990k
CB	Justin Hardee	New York Jets	March 16	3 years, $6.75 million
DE	Trey Hendrickson	Cincinnati Bengals	March 15	4 years, $60 million
DT	Sheldon Rankins	New York Jets	March 21	2 years, $17 million
MLB	Craig Robertson			
FS	D. J. Swearinger	Indianapolis Colts (PS)	December 29	1 year, $28k
FS	Marcus Williams	New Orleans Saints	March 9	1 year franchise tag, $10.612 million
FS	P. J. Williams	New Orleans Saints	March 18	1 year, $2.3 million

==== Restricted ====
Position	Player	2021 team	Date signed	Contract
C	Will Clapp	New Orleans Saints	April 20	1 year, $920k

=== Futures ===
Position	Player	Date signed
LB	Andrew Dowell	January 19
DT	Ryan Glasgow	January 19
TE	Garrett Griffin	January 19
CB	Grant Haley	January 19
OLB	Chase Hansen	January 19
WR	Lil'Jordan Humphrey	January 19
RB	Tony Jones Jr.	January 19
WR	Jake Lampman	January 19
DT	Christian Ringo	January 19
QB	Trevor Siemian	January 19
T	Calvin Throckmorton	January 19
DE	Marcus Willoughby	January 19
TE	Ethan Wolf	January 19
LB	Wynton McManis	January 20
CB	Keith Washington Jr.	January 22

=== Signings ===
Position	Player	2020 team	Date signed	Contract
FB	Alexander Armah	Carolina Panthers	March 16	1 year, $1.1275 million
TE	Nick Vannett	Denver Broncos	March 24	3 years, $8 million
DE	Tanoh Kpassagnon	Kansas City Chiefs	March 29	2 years, $4.5 million
WR	Jalen McCleskey	Atlanta Falcons	April 15	1 year, $660k
G	Christian Montano	Pittsburgh Steelers	April 20	1 year, $660k
DT	Albert Huggins	Detroit Lions	May 6	1 year, $780k
LB	Sutton Smith	Seattle Seahawks	May 6	1 year, $660k
WR	Easop Winston	Los Angeles Rams	May 6	1 year, $660k
OT	Kyle Murphy	Houston Texans	May 16	1 year, $850k
LB	Quentin Poling	Minnesota Vikings	May 16	1 year, $660k
CB	Brian Poole	New York Jets	July 25	1 year, $1.1275 million
DE	Kendall Donnerson	Carolina Panthers	July 26	1 year, $660k
WR	Chris Hogan	New York Jets	July 26	1 year, $1.075 million
WR	Tommylee Lewis	New Orleans Saints	July 30	1 year, $990k
RB	Devonta Freeman	Buffalo Bills	July 31	1 year, $1.075 million
CB	Prince Amukamara	Arizona Cardinals	August 1	1 year, $1.075 million
CB	KeiVarae Russell	Green Bay Packers	August 1	1 year, $920k
G	J. R. Sweezy	Arizona Cardinals	August 2	1 year, $1.075 million
CB	Adonis Alexander	San Francisco 49ers	August 4	1 year, $780k
TE	Josh Pederson	San Francisco 49ers	August 6	1 year, $660k
K	Brett Maher	Arizona Cardinals	August 9	1 year, $850k
DE	R. J. McIntosh	New York Giants	August 12	1 year, $920k
WR	Kevin White	San Francisco 49ers	August 17	1 year, $990k
T	Caleb Benenoch	Buffalo Bills	August 18	1 year, $990k
CB	Natrell Jamerson	Carolina Panthers	August 18	1 year, $920k
CB	Bryan Mills	Seattle Seahawks	August 18	1 year, $660k
T	Jordan Mills	Baltimore Ravens	August 18	1 year, $1.075 million
S	Jeff Heath	Las Vegas Raiders	August 20	1 year, $1.075 million
K	Aldrick Rosas	Jacksonville Jaguars	August 20	1 year, $990k
DT	Damion Square	Cleveland Browns	August 27	1 year, $1.075 million
DT	Montravius Adams	New England Patriots	September 1	1 year, $990k
FB	Adam Prentice	Denver Broncos	September 1	3 years, $2.435 million
CB	Desmond Trufant	Chicago Bears	September 6	1 year, $1.075 million
CB	Jordan Miller	Practice squad	September 11	1 year, $850k
DE	Jalyn Holmes	Practice squad	October 5	1 year, $920k
RB	Devine Ozigbo	Jacksonville Jaguars	October 5	1 year, $850k
K	Cody Parkey	Cleveland Browns	October 5	1 year, $990k
WR	Kenny Stills	Practice squad	October 9	1 year, $1.075 million
K	Brian Johnson	Chicago Bears	October 12	1 year, $660k
G	James Carpenter	Practice squad	December 18	1 year, $1.075 million

=== Practice squad additions ===
Position	Player	Last team	Date signed	Contract
CB	Ka'dar Hollman	Houston Texans	September 6	TBC
DE	Jalyn Holmes	Minnesota Vikings	September 6	1 year, $224k
DT	Jaleel Johnson	Houston Texans	September 6	1 year, $240k
CB	Dylan Mabin	Minnesota Vikings	September 6	1 year, $27.6k
CB	Jordan Miller	Seattle Seahawks	September 6	1 year, $147.2k
WR	Kenny Stills	Buffalo Bills	September 13	1 year, $238k
C	Austin Reiter	Kansas City Chiefs	September 14	1 year, $238k
RB	Ryquell Armstead	New York Giants	October 6	1 year, $128k
G	Forrest Lamp	Buffalo Bills	October 19	1 year, $168k
RB	Lamar Miller	Washington Football Team	October 19	1 year, $168k
LB	Lakiem Williams	Seattle Seahawks	October 19	1 year, $110.4k
RB	Josh Adams	New York Jets	November 9	1 year, $126k
WR	Malcolm Perry	New England Patriots	November 23	1 year, $64k
LB	Sharif Finch	Tennessee Titans	November 29	1 year, $55.2k
G	James Carpenter	Baltimore Ravens	December 8	1 year, $70k
T	Jerald Hawkins	New England Patriots	December 8	1 year, $70k
DT	Braxton Hoyett	Baltimore Ravens	December 22	1 year, $27.6k
QB	Blake Bortles	Green Bay Packers	December 24	1 year, $40k
LB	Justin March	San Francisco 49ers	December 27	1 year, $28k
DT	Ethan Westbrooks	Las Vegas Raiders	December 27	1 year, $28k
C	Cohl Cabral	Minnesota Vikings	December 31	1 year, $18.4k

=== Released/Waived ===
Position	Player	2021 team	Date released
G	Nick Easton		February 12
TE	Jason Vander Laan		February 12
TE	Cole Wick		February 12
TE	Jared Cook	Los Angeles Chargers	March 3
TE	Josh Hill	Detroit Lions	March 3
P	Thomas Morstead	New York Jets	March 4
CB	Janoris Jenkins	Tennessee Titans	March 11
MLB	Kwon Alexander	New Orleans Saints	March 16
WR	Emmanuel Sanders	Buffalo Bills	March 16
S	Eric Burrell	New Orleans Saints	May 14
CB	Trill Williams	Miami Dolphins	May 14
DT	Lorenzo Neal Jr.	Denver Broncos	August 2
CB	Lawrence Woods	New Orleans Saints	August 2
DE	Kendall Donnerson	Carolina Panthers	August 5
CB	Keith Washington Jr.		August 13
CB	Prince Amukamara		August 15
RB	Stevie Scott III	Denver Broncos	August 15
DE	Noah Spence	Cincinnati Bengals	August 15
WR	Jake Lampman		August 18
CB	Lawrence Woods		August 18
G	Mike Brown		August 20
TE	Josh Pederson		August 20
CB	Adonis Alexander		August 21
K	Brett Maher	New Orleans Saints	August 21
WR	Jalen McCleskey		August 21
LB	Quentin Poling		August 21
WR	Tommylee Lewis	Miami Dolphins (PS)	August 23
P	Nolan Cooney		August 24
OT	Kyle Murphy	Practice squad	August 25
FB	Sutton Smith	Las Vegas Raiders (PS)	August 27
S	Eric Burrell		August 30
CB	Natrell Jamerson	New York Jets (PS)	August 30
G	Derrick Kelly II	Practice squad	August 30
DE	R. J. McIntosh	Green Bay Packers (PS)	August 30
LB	Shaq Smith		August 30
FB	Alexander Armah	New Orleans Saints	August 31
WR	Kawaan Baker	Practice squad	August 31
T	Caleb Benenoch	New Orleans Saints	August 31
DT	Josiah Bronson	New Orleans Saints	August 31
RB	Devonta Freeman	Baltimore Ravens (PS)	August 31
CB	Grant Haley	Los Angeles Rams (PS)	August 31
WR	Chris Hogan	New Orleans Saints	August 31
DT	Albert Huggins	New Orleans Saints	August 31
LB	Wynton McManis	Practice squad	August 31
CB	Bryan Mills	Practice squad	August 31
T	Jordan Mills	New Orleans Saints	August 31
G	Christian Montano		August 31
CB	KeiVarae Russell	New Orleans Saints	August 31
QB	Trevor Siemian	New Orleans Saints	August 31
DT	Damion Square	Chicago Bears (PS)	August 31
G	J. R. Sweezy		August 31
S	Deuce Wallace		August 31
WR	Kevin White	New Orleans Saints	August 31
WR	Easop Winston	Practice squad	August 31
TE	Ethan Wolf	Practice squad	August 31
K	Aldrick Rosas	New Orleans Saints	September 1
CB	Bryce Thompson	Practice squad	September 1
DE	Marcus Willoughby		September 1
RB	Latavius Murray	Baltimore Ravens	September 7
S	Jeff Heath	New Orleans Saints	September 10
DT	Montravius Adams	New Orleans Saints	September 11
CB	Jordan Miller	New Orleans Saints	September 13
FB	Adam Prentice	New Orleans Saints	September 14
MLB	Wynton McManis	Practice squad	September 20
CB	Jordan Miller	Practice squad	September 20
K	Aldrick Rosas	Detroit Lions (PS)	October 5
DT	Christian Ringo	New Orleans Saints	October 9
K	Cody Parkey		October 12
CB	Brian Poole	New England Patriots (PS)	October 12
CB	Desmond Trufant	Las Vegas Raiders	October 12
C	Will Clapp	New Orleans Saints	October 25
DT	Albert Huggins	New Orleans Saints	October 25
RB	Devine Ozigbo	Jacksonville Jaguars	October 30
OLB	Chase Hansen	Practice squad	November 9
DT	Christian Ringo	New Orleans Saints	November 13
DT	Montravius Adams	Practice squad	November 16
K	Brian Johnson	Chicago Bears (PS)	November 19
CB	Ken Crawley	New Orleans Saints	November 20
WR	Kevin White	New Orleans Saints	November 20
CB	KeiVarae Russell	Practice squad	November 23
FB	Alexander Armah	Washington Football Team (PS)	November 30
WR	Kevin White	Practice squad	November 30
WR	Kenny Stills	New Orleans Saints	December 7
DT	Malcolm Roach	Practice squad	December 7
C	Will Clapp	Practice squad	December 13
DT	Josiah Bronson	Cleveland Browns	December 14

=== Practice squad releases ===
Position	Player	2021 team	Date released
LB	Wynton McManis	New Orleans Saints	September 6
CB	Bryan Mills	Cleveland Browns (PS)	September 6
DT	Jaleel Johnson	Houston Texans	September 14
CB	Ka'dar Hollman	New York Giants (PS)	September 28
C	Austin Reiter	Miami Dolphins	October 5
G	Derrick Kelly II	New York Giants (PS)	October 12
LB	Wynton McManis	Miami Dolphins (PS)	October 12
RB	Ryquell Armstead	Green Bay Packers (PS)	October 28
LB	Lakiem Williams	Seattle Seahawks (PS)	October 28
RB	Lamar Miller		November 16
DT	Montravius Adams	Pittsburgh Steelers	November 29
CB	Dylan Mabin	Practice squad	December 14
RB	Josh Adams	Practice squad	December 24
DT	Braxton Hoyett	Practice squad	December 24
DT	Braxton Hoyett	Practice squad	December 28
LB	Justin March	Las Vegas Raiders	December 28
T	Kyle Murphy		December 28
WR	Malcolm Perry		December 28
RB	Josh Adams		January 4

=== Contract extensions ===
Position	Player	Date signed	Contract
DE	Noah Spence	March 2	1 year, $990k
SS	J. T. Gray	March 3	2 years, $4 million
RB	Ty Montgomery	March 6	1 year, $1.1275 million
RB	Dwayne Washington	March 9	1 year, $990k
QB	Taysom Hill	March 14	1 year, $12.159 million
T	James Hurst	March 15	3 years, $9 million
QB	Jameis Winston	March 15	1 year, $5.5 million
T	Ryan Ramczyk	June 30	5 years, $96 million
CB	Marshon Lattimore	September 12	5 years, $97.6 million
QB	Taysom Hill	November 22	4 years, $40 million

=== Retirements ===
Position	Player	Date retired
QB	Drew Brees	March 14
T	Alex Hoffman	May 17
DT	Ryan Glasgow	August 7
CB	Patrick Robinson	August 10
WR	Chris Hogan	October 23

=== Player trades ===
Position	Player	From/to	Date traded	For
DT	Malcom Brown	Jacksonville Jaguars	March 16	2021 Seventh-round selection (pick 229) to Saints
CB	Bradley Roby	Houston Texans	September 8	2022 Third-round selection and 2023 Sixth-round selection to Texans
RB	Mark Ingram II	Houston Texans	October 27	2024 Seventh-round selection to Texans

== Draft ==
2021 New Orleans Saints Draft
Round	Selection	Player	Position	College	Notes
1	28	Payton Turner	DE	Houston	
2	60	Pete Werner	LB	Ohio State	
3	76	Paulson Adebo	CB	Stanford	from Denver
4	133	Ian Book	QB	Notre Dame	
6	206	Landon Young	OT	Kentucky	from Indianapolis
7	255	Kawaan Baker	WR	South Alabama	

Notes

- The Saints traded their third-round selection, along with a 2020 third-round selection, to the Cleveland Browns in exchange for the Browns' 2020 third- and seventh-round selections.
- The Saints traded a conditional fifth-round selection and linebacker Kiko Alonso to the San Francisco 49ers in exchange for linebacker Kwon Alexander.
- The Saints received third-round selections in 2021 and 2022 as compensation when its director of pro scouting Terry Fontenot was hired by the Atlanta Falcons as general manager.
- The Saints traded their sixth-round selection to the Houston Texans for the Texan's 2020 seventh-round selection.
- The Saints originally forfeited their seventh-round selection as the punishment for repeated COVID-19 protocol violations during the 2020 season, but the punishment was amended to a $700,000 fine and forfeiture of their 2022 sixth-round selection.
- The Saints received a seventh-round selection from the Jacksonville Jaguars in exchange for defensive tackle Malcom Brown.
- The Saints received a third-round selection (pick 76) from the Denver Broncos in exchange for a two third-round selections (picks 98 & 105).
- The Saints received a sixth-round selection (pick 206) from the Indianapolis Colts in exchange for a sixth-round selection (pick 218) and a seventh-round selection (pick 229).

=== Undrafted free agent signings ===
Position	Player	College	Date signed	Contract
DT	Josiah Bronson	Washington	May 2, 2021	3 years, $2.45 million
OL	Mike Brown	West Virginia	May 2, 2021	3 years, $2.425 million
S	Eric Burrell	Wisconsin	May 2, 2021	3 years, $2.425 million
P	Nolan Cooney	Syracuse	May 2, 2021	3 years, $2.425 million
OL	Alex Hoffman	Carroll College	May 2, 2021	3 years, $2.426 million
RB	Stevie Scott III	Indiana	May 2, 2021	3 years, $2.425 million
LB	Shaq Smith	Maryland	May 2, 2021	3 years, $2.425 million
TE	Dylan Soehner	Iowa State	May 2, 2021	3 years, $2.445 million
CB	Bryce Thompson	Tennessee	May 2, 2021	3 years, $2.425 million
CB	Trill Williams	Syracuse	May 2, 2021	3 years, $2.425 million
CB	Lawrence Woods	Truman State	May 2, 2021	3 years, $2.425 million
S	Deuce Wallace	Louisiana	May 13, 2021	3 years, $2.425 million
DT	Lorenzo Neal Jr.	Purdue	May 16, 2021	3 years, $2.425 million

== Staff ==
2021 New Orleans Saints staff
Front office: Owner – Gayle Benson; President – Dennis Lauscha; Executive vice president/general manager – Mickey Loomis; Senior vice president/chief operating officer – Ben Hales; Asst. general manager/college scouting director – Jeff Ireland; Vice president of football administration – Khai Harley; Director of operations – James Nagaoka; Director of pro scouting – Justin Matthews; Pro scout – Michael Parenton; Head coaches: Head coach – Sean Payton; Assistant head coach/defensive line – Ryan Nielsen; Offensive coaches: Offensive coordinator – Pete Carmichael; Quarterbacks – Ronald Curry; Running backs – Joel Thomas; Senior offensive assistant/wide receivers coach – Curtis Johnson; Run game coordinator/tight ends – Dan Roushar; Offensive line – Brendan Nugent; Assistant offensive line – Zach Strief; Assistant to the head coach/offensive assistant – Kevin Petry; Offensive assistant – Declan Doyle; Offensive assistant – D. J. Williams; Offensive analyst – Jim Chaney	Defensive coaches: Defensive coordinator – Dennis Allen; Linebackers – Michael Hodges; Defensive backs – Kris Richard; Senior defensive assistant – Peter Giunta; Assistant secondary – Cory Robinson; Pass rush specialist – Brian Young; Special teams coaches: Special teams coordinator – Darren Rizzi; Assistant special teams – Phil Galiano; Strength and conditioning: Head strength and conditioning – Dan Dalrymple; Assistant strength and conditioning – Charles Byrd; Assistant strength and conditioning – Rob Wenning

== Final roster ==
2021 New Orleans Saints roster
Quarterbacks (QB): 16 Ian Book; 7 Taysom Hill; 15 Trevor Siemian; Running backs (RB): 14 Mark Ingram II; 34 Tony Jones Jr.; 41 Alvin Kamara; 46 Adam Prentice FB; 24 Dwayne Washington; Wide receivers (WR): 1 Marquez Callaway; 11 Deonte Harris; 84 Lil'Jordan Humphrey; 88 Ty Montgomery; 10 Tre'Quan Smith; 12 Kenny Stills; Tight ends (TE): 83 Juwan Johnson; 82 Adam Trautman; 81 Nick Vannett	Offensive linemen (OL): 72 Terron Armstead T; 77 James Carpenter G; 74 James Hurst T; 78 Erik McCoy C; 79 Jordan Mills T; 71 Ryan Ramczyk T; 51 Cesar Ruiz G; 76 Calvin Throckmorton G; Defensive linemen (DL): 92 Marcus Davenport DE; 96 Carl Granderson DE; 57 Jalyn Holmes DE; 94 Cameron Jordan DE; 93 David Onyemata DT; 70 Christian Ringo DT; 99 Shy Tuttle DT	Linebackers (LB): 5 Kwon Alexander OLB; 53 Zack Baun OLB; 56 Demario Davis MLB; 50 Andrew Dowell MLB; 55 Kaden Elliss OLB; 20 Pete Werner OLB; Defensive backs (DB): 29 Paulson Adebo CB; 25 Ken Crawley CB; 22 C. J. Gardner-Johnson SS; 48 J. T. Gray SS; 38 Jeff Heath SS; 27 Malcolm Jenkins SS; 23 Marshon Lattimore CB; 21 Bradley Roby CB; 43 Marcus Williams FS; 26 P. J. Williams FS; Special teams (ST): 4 Blake Gillikin P; 19 Brett Maher K; 49 Zach Wood LS	Practice squad: 80 Kawaan Baker WR; 6 Blake Bortles QB (COVID-19); 68 Cohl Cabral C; 64 Will Clapp C; 59 Sharif Finch OLB; 42 Chase Hansen MLB; 63 Jerald Hawkins T; 52 Braxton Hoyett DT; 66 Forrest Lamp G; 37 Dylan Mabin CB; 36 Jordan Miller CB (COVID-19); 97 Malcolm Roach DT; 35 KeiVarae Russell CB; 32 Bryce Thompson CB; 91 Ethan Westbrooks DT; 17 Kevin White WR; 18 Easop Winston WR; 86 Ethan Wolf TE; Reserve: 65 Caleb Benenoch T (COVID-19); -- Jalen Dalton DT (IR); 73 Ethan Greenidge T (IR); 45 Garrett Griffin TE (IR/DFR); 95 Albert Huggins DT (COVID-19); 90 Tanoh Kpassagnon DE (IR); 3 Wil Lutz K (IR); 75 Andrus Peat G (IR); 89 Dylan Soehner TE (IR); 13 Michael Thomas WR (PUP); 98 Payton Turner DE (IR); 2 Jameis Winston QB (IR); 67 Landon Young T (IR); Rookies in italics 51 active, 13 reserve, 16 practice squad (2 exempt)

== Preseason ==
Week	Date	Opponent	Result	Record	Venue	Recap
1	August 14	at Baltimore Ravens	L 14–17	0–1	M&T Bank Stadium	Recap
2	August 23	Jacksonville Jaguars	W 23–21	1–1	Caesars Superdome	Recap
3	August 28	Arizona Cardinals	Cancelled due to Hurricane Ida			

== Regular season ==
=== Schedule ===
The Saints' 2021 schedule was announced on May 12.

Week	Date	Opponent	Result	Record	Venue	Recap
1	September 12	Green Bay Packers	**W** 38–3	1–0	TIAA Bank Field	Recap
2	September 19	at **Carolina Panthers**	**L** 7–26	1–1	Bank of America Stadium	Recap
3	September 26	at New England Patriots	**W** 28–13	2–1	Gillette Stadium	Recap
4	October 3	New York Giants	**L** 21–27 (OT)	2–2	Caesars Superdome	Recap
5	October 10	at Washington Football Team	**W** 33–22	3–2	FedExField	Recap
6	Bye					
7	October 25	at Seattle Seahawks	**W** 13–10	4–2	Lumen Field	Recap
8	October 31	**Tampa Bay Buccaneers**	**W** 36–27	5–2	Caesars Superdome	Recap
9	November 7	**Atlanta Falcons**	**L** 25–27	5–3	Caesars Superdome	Recap
10	November 14	at Tennessee Titans	**L** 21–23	5–4	Nissan Stadium	Recap
11	November 21	at Philadelphia Eagles	**L** 29–40	5–5	Lincoln Financial Field	Recap
12	November 25	Buffalo Bills	**L** 6–31	5–6	Caesars Superdome	Recap
13	December 2	Dallas Cowboys	**L** 17–27	5–7	Caesars Superdome	Recap
14	December 12	at New York Jets	**W** 30–9	6–7	MetLife Stadium	Recap
15	December 19	at **Tampa Bay Buccaneers**	**W** 9–0	7–7	Raymond James Stadium	Recap
16	December 27	Miami Dolphins	**L** 3–20	7–8	Caesars Superdome	Recap
17	January 2	**Carolina Panthers**	**W** 18–10	8–8	Caesars Superdome	Recap
18	January 9	at **Atlanta Falcons**	**W** 30–20	9–8	Mercedes-Benz Stadium	Recap

Note: Intra-division opponents are in bold text.

=== Game summaries ===
==== Week 1: vs. Green Bay Packers ====
Week 1: Green Bay Packers at New Orleans Saints – Game summary

Quarter	1	2	3	4	Total
Packers	0	3	0	0	**3**
**Saints**	3	14	7	14	**38**

at TIAA Bank Field, Jacksonville, Florida

- Date: September 12
- Game time: 4:25 p.m. EDT/3:25 p.m. CDT
- Game weather: Sunny, 83 °F (28 °C)
- Game attendance: 35,242
- Referee: Carl Cheffers
- TV announcers (Fox): Joe Buck, Troy Aikman, Erin Andrews and Tom Rinaldi
- Recap, Game Book

Game information

**First quarter**

- NO – Aldrick Rosas 44-yard field goal, 11:00. Saints 3–0. **Drive: 9 plays, 49 yards, 4:00.**

**Second quarter**

- NO – Alvin Kamara 3-yard pass from Jameis Winston (Aldrick Rosas kick), 14:18. Saints 10–0. **Drive: 15 plays, 76 yards, 7:51.**
- NO – Juwan Johnson 1-yard pass from Jameis Winston (Aldrick Rosas kick), 1:07. Saints 17–0. **Drive: 15 plays, 80 yards, 10:00.**
- GB – Mason Crosby 39-yard field goal, 0:00. Saints 17–3. **Drive: 6 plays, 54 yards, 1:07.**

**Third quarter**

- NO – Chris Hogan 10-yard pass from Jameis Winston (Aldrick Rosas kick), 3:07. Saints 24–3. **Drive: 3 plays, 12 yards, 1:26.**

**Fourth quarter**

- NO – Juwan Johnson 8-yard pass from Jameis Winston (Aldrick Rosas kick), 14:54. Saints 31–3. **Drive: 4 plays, 21 yards, 1:41.**
- NO – Deonte Harris 55-yard pass from Jameis Winston (Aldrick Rosas kick), 10:46. Saints 38–3. **Drive: 4 plays, 66 yards, 2:14.**

**Top passers**

- GB – Aaron Rodgers – 15/28, 133 yards, 2 INT
- NO – Jameis Winston – 14/20, 148 yards, 5 TD

**Top rushers**

- GB – A. J. Dillon – 4 rushes, 19 yards
- NO – Alvin Kamara – 20 rushes, 83 yards

**Top receivers**

- GB – Davante Adams – 5 receptions, 56 yards
- NO – Juwan Johnson – 3 receptions, 21 yards, 2 TD

Despite being in Jacksonville due to the impacts of Hurricane Ida, the Saints still started their regular season 1–0 with the victory against Green Bay. Jameis Winston notched his first win as a Saints quarterback and set an odd record for least yards thrown (148) in a 5 passing TD game since 1948. This was also the Saints first victory over the Packers since the 2017 season.

==== Week 2: at Carolina Panthers ====
Week 2: New Orleans Saints at Carolina Panthers – Game summary

Quarter	1	2	3	4	Total
Saints	0	0	0	7	**7**
**Panthers**	7	10	0	9	**26**

at Bank of America Stadium, Charlotte, North Carolina

- Date: September 19
- Game time: 1:00 p.m. EDT/12:00 p.m. CDT
- Game weather: Partly cloudy, 82 °F (28 °C)
- Game attendance: 70,675
- Referee: Ronald Torbert
- TV announcers (Fox): Chris Myers, Daryl Johnston and Jen Hale
- Recap, Game Book

Game information

**First quarter**

- CAR – Brandon Zylstra 20-yard pass from Sam Darnold (Zane Gonzalez kick), 12:00. Panthers 7–0. **Drive: 5 plays, 75 yards, 3:00.**

**Second quarter**

- CAR – Zane Gonzalez 20-yard field goal, 11:11. Panthers 10–0. **Drive: 15 plays, 64 yards, 8:57.**
- CAR – D. J. Moore 2-yard pass from Sam Darnold (Zane Gonzalez kick), 1:55. Panthers 17–0. **Drive: 10 plays, 72 yards, 5:30.**

**Third quarter**

- No scoring plays

**Fourth quarter**

- NO – Jameis Winston 8-yard run (Aldrick Rosas kick), 14:37. Panthers 17–7. **Drive: 5 plays, 18 yards, 1:57.**
- CAR – Christian McCaffrey 11-yard run (kick failed), 5:53. Panthers 23–7. **Drive: 7 plays, 53 yards, 2:49.**
- CAR – Zane Gonzalez 42-yard field goal, 3:21. Panthers 26–7. **Drive: 4 plays, 8 yards, 1:07.**

**Top passers**

- NO – Jameis Winston – 11/22, 111 yards, 2 INT
- CAR – Sam Darnold – 26/38, 305 yards, 2 TD, INT

**Top rushers**

- NO – Jameis Winston – 3 rushes, 19 yards, TD
- CAR – Christian McCaffrey – 24 rushes, 72 yards, TD

**Top receivers**

- NO – Lil'Jordan Humphrey – 1 reception, 27 yards
- CAR – D. J. Moore – 8 receptions, 79 yards, TD

With Sam Darnold as the Panthers starting quarterback, the Saints struggled with turnovers and scoring. With the loss, their record fell to 1–1. This was the Saints first loss against the Panthers since the 2018 season.

==== Week 3: at New England Patriots ====
Week 3: New Orleans Saints at New England Patriots – Game summary

Quarter	1	2	3	4	Total
**Saints**	7	7	7	7	**28**
Patriots	0	3	3	7	**13**

at Gillette Stadium, Foxborough, Massachusetts

- Date: September 26
- Game time: 1:00 p.m. EDT/12:00 p.m. CDT
- Game weather: Sunny, 70 °F (21 °C)
- Game attendance: 65,878
- Referee: John Hussey
- TV announcers (Fox): Adam Amin, Mark Schlereth and Shannon Spake
- Preview, Game Book

Game information

**First quarter**

- NO – Alvin Kamara 11-yard pass from Jameis Winston (Aldrick Rosas kick), 7:35. Saints 7–0. **Drive: 11 plays, 69 yards, 4:58.**

**Second quarter**

- NO – Marquez Callaway 7-yard pass from Jameis Winston (Aldrick Rosas kick), 1:44. Saints 14–0. **Drive: 3 plays, 9 yards, 1:00.**
- NE – Nick Folk 45-yard field goal, 0:34. Saints 14–3. **Drive: 6 plays, 48 yards, 1:10.**

**Third quarter**

- NO – Malcolm Jenkins 34-yard interception return (Aldrick Rosas kick), 14:51. Saints 21–3.
- NE – Nick Folk 26-yard field goal, 1:32. Saints 21–6. **Drive: 16 plays, 72 yards, 9:05.**

**Fourth quarter**

- NE – Kendrick Bourne 22-yard pass from Mac Jones (Nick Folk kick), 9:22. Saints 21–13. **Drive: 3 plays, 44 yards, 1:06.**
- NO – Taysom Hill 4-yard run (Aldrick Rosas kick), 2:37. Saints 28–13. **Drive: 13 plays, 75 yards, 6:45.**

**Top passers**

- NO – Jameis Winston – 13/21, 128 yards, 2 TD
- NE – Mac Jones – 30/51, 270 yards, TD, 3 INT

**Top rushers**

- NO – Alvin Kamara – 24 rushes, 89 yards
- NE – Mac Jones – 6 rushes, 28 yards

**Top receivers**

- NO – Marquez Callaway – 4 receptions, 41 yards, TD
- NE – Kendrick Bourne – 6 receptions, 96 yards, TD

For the first time since the 2009 season, the Saints beat the Patriots. This also marked the Saints' first road game victory against New England. This victory improved their record to 2–1.

==== Week 4: vs. New York Giants ====
Week 4: New York Giants at New Orleans Saints – Game summary

Quarter	1	2	3	4	OT	Total
**Giants**	0	7	3	11	6	**27**
Saints	0	7	7	7	0	**21**

at Caesars Superdome, New Orleans, Louisiana

- Date: October 3
- Game time: 12:00 p.m. CDT
- Game weather: None (indoor stadium)
- Game attendance: 69,170
- Referee: Brad Rogers
- TV announcers (Fox): Kenny Albert, Jonathan Vilma and Sara Walsh
- Recap, Game Book

Game information

**First quarter**

- No scoring plays

**Second quarter**

- NYG – John Ross 52-yard pass from Daniel Jones (Graham Gano kick), 8:51. Giants 7–0. **Drive: 1 plays, 52 yards, 0:08.**
- NO – Juwan Johnson 15-yard pass from Jameis Winston (Aldrick Rosas kick), 0:23. Tied 7–7. **Drive: 13 plays, 75 yards, 8:28.**

**Third quarter**

- NO – Taysom Hill 8-yard run (Aldrick Rosas kick), 13:24. Saints 14–7. **Drive: 3 plays, 75 yards, 1:36.**
- NYG – Graham Gano 23-yard field goal, 8:46. Saints 14–10. **Drive: 10 plays, 70 yards, 4:48.**

**Fourth quarter**

- NO – Taysom Hill 8-yard run (Aldrick Rosas kick), 12:09. Saints 21–10. **Drive: 11 plays, 63 yards, 6:14.**
- NYG – Saquon Barkley 54-yard pass from Daniel Jones (Daniel Jones run), 6:52. Saints 21–18. **Drive: 1 play, 54 yards, 0:09.**
- NYG – Graham Gano 48-yard field goal, 0:31. Tied 21–21. **Drive: 11 plays, 59 yards, 2:30.**

**Overtime**

- NYG – Saquon Barkley 6-yard run, 4:54. Giants 27–21. **Drive: 9 plays, 75 yards, 5:06.**

**Top passers**

- NYG – Daniel Jones – 28/40, 402 yards, 2 TD, INT
- NO – Jameis Winston – 17/23, 226 yards, TD

**Top rushers**

- NYG – Saquon Barkley – 13 rushes, 52 yards, TD
- NO – Alvin Kamara – 26 rushes, 120 yards

**Top receivers**

- NYG – Kenny Golladay – 6 receptions, 116 yards
- NO – Marquez Callaway – 2 receptions, 74 yards

The Saints returned to the Superdome shortly after repairs from the hurricane and fire from a pressure washer mishap, but ultimately lost to the Giants in overtime due to Aldrick Rosas missing field goals. Suffering their first loss to the Giants since 2016, it also dropped their record to 2–2 and prompted the team to cut Rosas for a replacement kicker.

==== Week 5: at Washington Football Team ====
Week 5: New Orleans Saints at Washington Football Team – Game summary

Quarter	1	2	3	4	Total
**Saints**	7	13	0	13	**33**
Washington	6	7	3	6	**22**

at FedExField, Landover, Maryland

- Date: October 10
- Game time: 1:00 p.m. EDT/12:00 p.m. CDT
- Game weather: Cloudy, 68 °F (20 °C)
- Game attendance: 50,137
- Referee: Shawn Smith
- TV announcers (CBS): Spero Dedes and Jay Feely
- Recap, Game Book

Game information

**First quarter**

- WAS – Dustin Hopkins 45-yard field goal, 12:27. Football Team 3–0. **Drive: 4 plays, 5 yards, 0:52.**
- NO – Deonte Harris 72-yard pass from Jameis Winston (Cody Parkey kick), 11:13. Saints 7–3. **Drive: 3 plays, 75 yards, 1:14.**
- WAS – Dustin Hopkins 23-yard field goal, 4:55. Saints 7–6. **Drive: 12 plays, 72 yards, 6:18.**

**Second quarter**

- WAS – Antonio Gibson 5-yard run (Dustin Hopkins kick), 14:16. Football Team 13–7. **Drive: 7 plays, 44 yards, 4:11.**
- NO – Alvin Kamara 23-yard run (kick failed), 10:58. Tied 13–13. **Drive: 6 plays, 75 yards, 3:18.**
- NO – Marquez Callaway 49-yard pass from Jameis Winston (Cody Parkey kick), 0:00. Saints 20–13. **Drive: 1 plays, 49 yards, 0:08.**

**Third quarter**

- WAS – Dustin Hopkins 24-yard field goal, 1:53. Saints 20–16. **Drive: 14 plays, 69 yards, 7:20.**

**Fourth quarter**

- NO – Marquez Callaway 12-yard pass from Jameis Winston (Cody Parkey kick), 12:12. Saints 27–16. **Drive: 4 plays, 26 yards, 1:32.**
- WAS – Antonio Gibson 1-yard run (pass failed), 7:51. Saints 27–22. **Drive: 8 plays, 75 yards, 4:21.**
- NO – Alvin Kamara 19-yard pass from Jameis Winston (kick failed), 3:15. Saints 33–22. **Drive: 8 plays, 75 yards, 4:36.**

**Top passers**

- NO – Jameis Winston – 15/30, 279 yards, 4 TD, INT
- WAS – Taylor Heinicke – 20/41, 248 yards, 2 INT

**Top rushers**

- NO – Alvin Kamara – 16 rushes, 71 yards, TD
- WAS – Antonio Gibson – 20 rushes, 60 yards, 2 TD

**Top receivers**

- NO – Marquez Callaway – 4 receptions, 85 yards, 2 TD
- WAS – Adam Humphries – 3 receptions, 73 yards

The Saints matched up with Washington for the first time since the 2018 season, but faced quarterback Taylor Heinicke due to Ryan Fitzpatrick's injury in Week 1. The Saints also brought in Cody Parkey, who missed a few field goals or PAT's. With the win, they improved to 3–2.

==== Week 7: at Seattle Seahawks ====
Week 7: New Orleans Saints at Seattle Seahawks – Game summary

Quarter	1	2	3	4	Total
**Saints**	0	10	0	3	**13**
Seahawks	7	0	3	0	**10**

at Lumen Field, Seattle, Washington

- Date: October 25
- Game time: 7:15 p.m. CDT/5:15 p.m. PDT
- Game weather: Rain, 55 °F (13 °C)
- Game attendance: 68,563
- Referee: Shawn Hochuli
- TV announcers (ESPN): Steve Levy, Brian Griese, Louis Riddick, Lisa Salters and John Parry
- Recap, Game Book

Game information

**First quarter**

- SEA – DK Metcalf 84-yard pass from Geno Smith (Jason Myers kick), 10:08. Seahawks 7–0. **Drive: 2 plays, 84 yards, 0:51.**

**Second quarter**

- NO – Brian Johnson 21-yard field goal, 4:23. Seahawks 7–3. **Drive: 19 plays, 86 yards, 10:16.**
- NO – Alvin Kamara 13-yard pass from Jameis Winston (Brian Johnson kick), 0:40. Saints 10–7. **Drive: 7 plays, 85 yards, 1:46.**

**Third quarter**

- SEA – Jason Myers 50-yard field goal, 0:14. Tied 10–10. **Drive: 4 plays, 0 yards, 1:20.**

**Fourth quarter**

- NO – Brian Johnson 33-yard field goal, 1:56. Saints 13–10. **Drive: 13 plays, 42 yards, 4:48.**

**Top passers**

- NO – Jameis Winston – 19/35, 222 yards, TD
- SEA – Geno Smith – 12/22, 167 yards, TD

**Top rushers**

- NO – Alvin Kamara – 20 rushes, 51 yards
- SEA – Alex Collins – 16 rushes, 35 yards

**Top receivers**

- NO – Alvin Kamara – 10 receptions, 128 yards, TD
- SEA – DK Metcalf – 2 receptions, 96 yards, TD

For the first time since the 2013 season, the Saints played the Seahawks on a Monday Night game. It's also their 3-point victory. They also replaced Cody Parkey with rookie kicker, Brian Johnson. They also bumped their record to 4–2.

==== Week 8: vs. Tampa Bay Buccaneers ====
Week 8: Tampa Bay Buccaneers at New Orleans Saints – Game summary

Quarter	1	2	3	4	Total
Buccaneers	7	0	14	6	**27**
**Saints**	7	9	7	13	**36**

at Caesars Superdome, New Orleans, Louisiana

- Date: October 31
- Game time: 3:25 p.m. CDT
- Game weather: None (indoor stadium)
- Game attendance: 69,170
- Referee: Clete Blakeman
- TV announcers (Fox): Joe Davis, Troy Aikman, Erin Andrews and Tom Rinaldi
- Recap, Game Book

Game information

**First quarter**

- TB – Chris Godwin 12-yard pass from Tom Brady (Ryan Succop kick), 8:28. Buccaneers 7–0. **Drive: 6 plays, 44 yards, 2:26.**
- NO – Tre'Quan Smith 16-yard pass from Jameis Winston (Brian Johnson kick), 2:39. Tied 7–7. **Drive: 11 plays, 75 yards, 5:49.**

**Second quarter**

- NO – Brian Johnson 23-yard field goal, 2:20. Saints 10–7. **Drive: 10 plays, 58 yards, 5:16.**
- NO – Alex Armah 1-yard pass from Trevor Siemian (kick failed), 0:27. Saints 16–7. **Drive: 5 plays, 35 yards, 1:21.**

**Third quarter**

- NO – Alvin Kamara 1-yard run (Brian Johnson kick), 9:01. Saints 23–7. **Drive: 10 plays, 76 yards, 5:59.**
- TB – Giovani Bernard 7-yard pass from Tom Brady (Ryan Succop kick), 5:33. Saints 23–14. **Drive: 8 plays, 75 yards, 3:28.**
- TB – Mike Evans 41-yard pass from Tom Brady (Ryan Succop kick), 1:15. Saints 23–21. **Drive: 5 plays, 69 yards, 3:11.**

**Fourth quarter**

- NO – Brian Johnson 35-yard field goal, 8:31. Saints 26–21. **Drive: 8 plays, 50 yards, 3:37.**
- TB – Cyril Grayson 50-yard pass from Tom Brady (run failed), 5:44. Buccaneers 27–26. **Drive: 5 plays, 75 yards, 2:47.**
- NO – Brian Johnson 23-yard field goal, 1:41. Saints 29–27. **Drive: 12 plays, 70 yards, 4:03.**
- NO – P. J. Williams 40-yard interception return (Brian Johnson kick), 1:24. Saints 36–27.

**Top passers**

- TB – Tom Brady – 28/40, 375 yards, 4 TD, 2 INT
- NO – Trevor Siemian – 16/29, 159 yards, TD

**Top rushers**

- TB – Giovani Bernard – 2 rushes, 30 yards
- NO – Alvin Kamara – 19 rushes, 61 yards, TD

**Top receivers**

- TB – Chris Godwin – 8 receptions, 140 yards, TD
- NO – Kevin White – 1 reception, 38 yards

They meet Tom Brady again for the first time since the Divisional Round. Jameis Winston was hurt after a horse-collar tackle slammed him to the ground, prompting Trevor Siemian to start for the rest of the game and beyond. The Buccaneers were stunned after P.J. Williams scored a pick six. With the victory, they improve to 5–2.

==== Week 9: vs. Atlanta Falcons ====
Week 9: Atlanta Falcons at New Orleans Saints – Game summary

Quarter	1	2	3	4	Total
**Falcons**	3	7	7	10	**27**
Saints	0	0	3	22	**25**

at Caesars Superdome, New Orleans, Louisiana

- Date: November 7
- Game time: 12:00 p.m. CST
- Game weather: None (indoor stadium)
- Game attendance: 69,170
- Referee: Alex Kemp
- TV announcers (Fox): Kenny Albert, Jonathan Vilma and Sara Walsh
- Recap, Game Book

Game information

**First quarter**

- ATL – Younghoe Koo 32-yard field goal, 4:26. Falcons 3–0. **Drive: 8 plays, 64 yards, 3:45.**

**Second quarter**

- ATL – Olamide Zaccheaus 3-yard pass from Matt Ryan (Younghoe Koo kick), 0:06. Falcons 10–0. **Drive: 15 plays, 92 yards, 5:30.**

**Third quarter**

- NO – Brian Johnson 35-yard field goal, 9:36. Falcons 10–3. **Drive: 12 plays, 60 yards, 5:24.**
- ATL – Matt Ryan 1-yard run (Younghoe Koo kick), 5:13. Falcons 17–3. **Drive: 7 plays, 81 yards, 4:23.**

**Fourth quarter**

- NO – Brian Johnson 52-yard field goal, 14:49. Falcons 17–6. **Drive: 11 plays, 45 yards, 5:24.**
- ATL – Olamide Zaccheaus 6-yard pass from Matt Ryan (Younghoe Koo kick), 10:39. Falcons 24–6. **Drive: 1 play, 6 yards, 0:07.**
- NO – Marquez Callaway 5-yard pass from Trevor Siemian (Brian Johnson kick), 7:57. Falcons 24–13. **Drive: 8 plays, 66 yards, 2:42.**
- NO – Alvin Kamara 2-yard run (pass failed), 4:35. Falcons 24–19. **Drive: 6 plays, 54 yards, 0:51.**
- NO – Kenny Stills 8-yard pass from Trevor Siemian (run failed), 1:01. Saints 25–24. **Drive: 5 plays, 43 yards, 1:45.**
- ATL – Younghoe Koo 29-yard field goal, 0:00. Falcons 27–25. **Drive: 5 plays, 64 yards, 1:01.**

**Top passers**

- ATL – Matt Ryan – 23/30, 343 yards, 2 TD
- NO – Trevor Siemian – 25/41, 249 yards, 2 TD

**Top rushers**

- ATL – Mike Davis – 9 rushes, 13 yards
- NO – Alvin Kamara – 13 rushes, 50 yards, TD

**Top receivers**

- ATL – Cordarrelle Patterson – 6 receptions, 126 yards
- NO – Alvin Kamara – 4 receptions, 54 yards

The Saints were defeated by the Falcons for the first time since the 2019 season. It was also the first struggle of the season to gain victories. They dropped to 5–3.

==== Week 10: at Tennessee Titans ====
Week 10: New Orleans Saints at Tennessee Titans – Game summary

Quarter	1	2	3	4	Total
Saints	0	6	6	9	**21**
**Titans**	3	10	7	3	**23**

at Nissan Stadium, Nashville, Tennessee

- Date: November 14
- Game time: 12:00 p.m. CST
- Game weather: Cloudy, 55 °F (13 °C)
- Game attendance: 69,414
- Referee: Jerome Boger
- TV announcers (CBS): Kevin Harlan, Trent Green and Melanie Collins
- Recap, GameBook

Game information

**First quarter**

- TEN – Randy Bullock 28-yard field goal, 0:52. Titans 3–0. **Drive: 8 plays, 70 yards, 3:38.**

**Second quarter**

- NO – Tre'Quan Smith 11-yard pass from Trevor Siemian (kick failed), 12:59. Saints 6–3. **Drive: 6 plays, 75 yards, 2:53.**
- TEN – Randy Bullock 36-yard field goal, 7:44. Tied 6–6. **Drive: 10 plays, 59 yards, 5:15.**
- TEN – Ryan Tannehill 1-yard run (Randy Bullock kick), 1:38. Titans 13–6. **Drive: 8 plays, 56 yards, 3:23.**

**Third quarter**

- TEN – MyCole Pruitt 2-yard pass from Ryan Tannehill (Randy Bullock kick), 12:02. Titans 20–6. **Drive: 5 plays, 19 yards, 2:51.**
- NO – Mark Ingram II 13-yard run (kick failed), 3:54. Titans 20–12. **Drive: 11 plays, 87 yards, 5:11.**

**Fourth quarter**

- TEN – Randy Bullock 36-yard field goal, 10:01. Titans 23–12. **Drive: 11 plays, 55 yards, 6:23.**
- NO – Brian Johnson 20-yard field goal, 5:33. Titans 23–15. **Drive: 8 plays, 67 yards, 4:28.**
- NO – Marquez Callaway 15-yard pass from Trevor Siemian (pass failed), 1:16. Titans 23–21. **Drive: 7 plays, 71 yards, 2:18.**

**Top passers**

- NO – Trevor Siemian – 19/34, 298 yards, 2 TD
- TEN – Ryan Tannehill – 19/27, 213 yards, TD

**Top rushers**

- NO – Mark Ingram II – 14 rushes, 47 yards, TD
- TEN – D'Onta Foreman – 11 rushes, 30 yards

**Top receivers**

- NO – Deonte Harris – 3 receptions, 84 yards
- TEN – Marcus Johnson – 5 receptions, 100 yards

The Saints lose to the Titans for the first time six seasons ago. Their kicker, Brian Johnson also struggled to kick PAT's. Their record drops to 5–4.

==== Week 11: at Philadelphia Eagles ====
Week 11: New Orleans Saints at Philadelphia Eagles – Game summary

Quarter	1	2	3	4	Total
Saints	0	7	0	22	**29**
**Eagles**	14	13	6	7	**40**

at Lincoln Financial Field, Philadelphia, Pennsylvania

- Date: November 21
- Game time: 1:00 p.m. EST/12:00 p.m. CST
- Game weather: Mostly cloudy, 52 °F (11 °C)
- Game attendance: 69,796
- Referee: Scott Novak
- TV announcers (Fox): Adam Amin, Mark Schlereth and Shannon Spake
- Recap, Game Book

Game information

**First quarter**

- PHI – Jalen Hurts 1-yard run (Jake Elliott kick), 7:17. Eagles 7–0. **Drive: 7 plays, 39 yards, 2:20.**
- PHI – Jalen Hurts 3-yard run (Jake Elliott kick), 2:02. Eagles 14–0. **Drive: 7 plays, 58 yards, 3:52.**

**Second quarter**

- NO – Adam Trautman 18-yard pass from Trevor Siemian (Brett Maher kick), 13:01. Eagles 14–7. **Drive: 3 plays, 6 yards, 0:59.**
- PHI – Jake Elliott 50-yard field goal, 9:27. Eagles 17–7. **Drive: 7 plays, 43 yards, 3:34.**
- PHI – Jake Elliott 37-yard field goal, 4:20. Eagles 20–7. **Drive: 11 plays, 56 yards, 4:13.**
- PHI – Darius Slay 51-yard interception return (Jake Elliott kick), 0:24. Eagles 27–7.

**Third quarter**

- PHI – Jake Elliott 33-yard field goal, 5:57. Eagles 30–7. **Drive: 8 plays, 25 yards, 4:51.**
- PHI – Jake Elliott 47-yard field goal, 2:38. Eagles 33–7. **Drive: 5 plays, 12 yards, 2:42.**

**Fourth quarter**

- NO – Marquez Callaway 26-yard pass from Trevor Siemian (pass failed), 14:49. Eagles 33–13. **Drive: 7 plays, 75 yards, 2:49.**
- NO – Trevor Siemian 17-yard run (kick failed), 12:33. Eagles 33–19. **Drive: 3 plays, 39 yards, 1:12.**
- NO – Brett Maher 28-yard field goal, 7:14. Eagles 33–22. **Drive: 8 plays, 39 yards, 3:38.**
- PHI – Jalen Hurts 24-yard run (Jake Elliott kick), 3:59. Eagles 40–22. **Drive: 9 plays, 74 yards, 3:15.**
- NO – Lil'Jordan Humphrey 4-yard pass from Trevor Siemian (Brett Maher kick), 0:45. Eagles 40–29. **Drive: 11 plays, 75 yards, 3:14.**

**Top passers**

- NO – Trevor Siemian – 22/40, 214 yards, 3 TD, 2 INT
- PHI – Jalen Hurts – 13/24, 147 yards

**Top rushers**

- NO – Mark Ingram II – 16 rushes, 88 yards
- PHI – Miles Sanders – 16 rushes, 94 yards

**Top receivers**

- NO – Tre'Quan Smith – 5 receptions, 64 yards
- PHI – Dallas Goedert – 5 receptions, 62 yards

Although the Saints got kicker Brett Maher from the Cowboys, the Saints still lost and downgraded their record to 5–5.

==== Week 12: vs. Buffalo Bills ====
Thanksgiving Day games

Week 12: Buffalo Bills at New Orleans Saints – Game summary

Quarter	1	2	3	4	Total
**Bills**	7	3	14	7	**31**
Saints	0	0	0	6	**6**

at Caesars Superdome, New Orleans, Louisiana

- Date: November 25
- Game time: 7:20 p.m. CST
- Game weather: None (indoor stadium)
- Game attendance: 69,170
- Referee: Brad Allen
- TV announcers (NBC): Mike Tirico, Drew Brees, Michele Tafoya and Terry McAulay
- Recap, Game Book

Game information

**First quarter**

- BUF – Dawson Knox 7-yard pass from Josh Allen (Tyler Bass kick), 7:09. Bills 7–0. **Drive: 10 plays, 65 yards, 5:54.**

**Second quarter**

- BUF – Tyler Bass 34-yard field goal, 8:46. Bills 10–0. **Drive: 7 plays, 38 yards, 4:00.**

**Third quarter**

- BUF – Stefon Diggs 5-yard pass from Josh Allen (Tyler Bass kick), 8:48. Bills 17–0. **Drive: 11 plays, 75 yards, 6:12.**
- BUF – Dawson Knox 24-yard pass from Josh Allen (Tyler Bass kick), 4:19. Bills 24–0. **Drive: 5 plays, 53 yards, 2:51.**

**Fourth quarter**

- NO – Nick Vannett 11-yard pass from Trevor Siemian (pass failed), 14:54. Bills 24–6. **Drive: 10 plays, 75 yards, 4:25.**
- BUF – Matt Breida 23-yard pass from Josh Allen (Tyler Bass kick), 8:17. Bills 31–6. **Drive: 4 plays, 51 yards, 2:25.**

**Top passers**

- BUF – Josh Allen – 23/28, 260 yards, 4 TD, 2 INT
- NO – Trevor Siemian – 17/29, 163 yards, TD, INT

**Top rushers**

- BUF – Devin Singletary – 15 rushes, 44 yards
- NO – Tony Jones Jr. – 16 rushes, 27 yards

**Top receivers**

- BUF – Stefon Diggs – 7 receptions, 74 yards, TD
- NO – Lil'Jordan Humphrey – 3 receptions, 47 yards

The Saints host the Bills in the Superdome. This was also Drew Brees' return to New Orleans as a broadcast partner for NBC. The Saints unfortunately gave up to the Bills and went down to 5–6. This was also their first loss to Buffalo since the 1998 season.

==== Week 13: vs. Dallas Cowboys ====
Week 13: Dallas Cowboys at New Orleans Saints – Game summary

Quarter	1	2	3	4	Total
**Cowboys**	7	6	7	7	**27**
Saints	0	7	3	7	**17**

at Caesars Superdome, New Orleans, Louisiana

- Date: December 2
- Game time: 7:20 p.m. CST
- Game weather: None (indoor stadium)
- Game attendance: 69,170
- Referee: Brad Rogers
- TV announcers (Fox/NFLN/Prime Video): Joe Buck, Troy Aikman, Erin Andrews and Kristina Pink
- Recap, Game Book

Game information

**First quarter**

- DAL – Michael Gallup 1-yard pass from Dak Prescott (Greg Zuerlein kick), 0:59. Cowboys 7–0. **Drive: 6 plays, 80 yards, 3:16.**

**Second quarter**

- NO – Lil'Jordan Humphrey 24-yard pass from Taysom Hill (Brett Maher kick), 12:54. Tied 7–7. **Drive: 7 plays, 75 yards, 3:05.**
- DAL – Greg Zuerlein 55-yard field goal, 9:04. Cowboys 10–7. **Drive: 7 plays, 39 yards, 3:50.**
- DAL – Greg Zuerlein 34-yard field goal, 0:00. Cowboys 13–7. **Drive: 12 plays, 79 yards, 2:19.**

**Third quarter**

- NO – Brett Maher 42-yard field goal, 8:26. Cowboys 13–10. **Drive: 11 plays, 55 yards, 5:03.**
- DAL – Tony Pollard 58-yard run (Greg Zuerlein kick), 3:55. Cowboys 20–10. **Drive: 4 plays, 71 yards, 1:03.**

**Fourth quarter**

- DAL – Carlos Watkins 29-yard interception return (Greg Zuerlein kick), 2:52. Cowboys 27–10.
- NO – Deonte Harris 70-yard pass from Taysom Hill (Brett Maher kick), 2:32. Cowboys 27–17. **Drive: 2 plays, 70 yards, 0:20.**

**Top passers**

- DAL – Dak Prescott – 26/40, 238 yards, TD, INT
- NO – Taysom Hill – 19/41, 264 yards, 2 TD, 4 INT

**Top rushers**

- DAL – Tony Pollard – 7 rushes, 71 yards, TD
- NO – Taysom Hill – 11 rushes, 101 yards

**Top receivers**

- DAL – CeeDee Lamb – 7 receptions, 89 yards
- NO – Deonte Harris – 4 receptions, 96 yards, TD

After Trevor Siemian struggled to win those games, Taysom Hill was placed as a starter. They would lose to the Cowboys for the first time since the 2018 season, which brought their record down to 5–7.

==== Week 14: at New York Jets ====
Week 14: New Orleans Saints at New York Jets – Game summary

Quarter	1	2	3	4	Total
**Saints**	3	7	3	17	**30**
Jets	0	6	0	3	**9**

at MetLife Stadium, East Rutherford, New Jersey

- Date: December 12
- Game time: 1:00 p.m. EST/12:00 p.m. CST
- Game weather: Sunny, 48 °F (9 °C)
- Game attendance: 69,129
- Referee: Land Clark
- TV announcers (CBS): Andrew Catalon, James Lofton and Sherree Burruss
- Recap, Game Book

Game information

**First quarter**

- NO – Brett Maher 23-yard field goal, 6:37. Saints 3–0. **Drive: 14 plays, 65 yards, 7:24.**

**Second quarter**

- NYJ – Eddy Piñeiro 36-yard field goal, 10:01. Tied 3–3. **Drive: 9 plays, 38 yards, 3:10.**
- NO – Alvin Kamara 16-yard run (Brett Maher kick), 3:42. Saints 10–3. **Drive: 6 plays, 54 yards, 3:13.**
- NYJ – Eddy Piñeiro 46-yard field goal, 0:00. Saints 10–6. **Drive: 10 plays, 47 yards, 3:42.**

**Third quarter**

- NO – Brett Maher 31-yard field goal, 0:58. Saints 13–6. **Drive: 15 plays, 80 yards, 9:01.**

**Fourth quarter**

- NO – Brett Maher 37-yard field goal, 12:22. Saints 16–6. **Drive: 7 plays, 31 yards, 2:38.**
- NO – Taysom Hill 2-yard run (Brett Maher kick), 5:28. Saints 23–6. **Drive: 8 plays, 51 yards, 4:46.**
- NYJ – Eddy Piñeiro 36-yard field goal, 3:29. Saints 23–9. **Drive: 10 plays, 53 yards, 1:59.**
- NO – Taysom Hill 44-yard run (Brett Maher kick), 1:07. Saints 30–9. **Drive: 3 plays, 42 yards, 1:32.**

**Top passers**

- NO – Taysom Hill – 15/21, 175 yards
- NYJ – Zach Wilson – 19/42, 202 yards

**Top rushers**

- NO – Alvin Kamara – 27 rushes, 120 yards, TD
- NYJ – Zach Wilson – 4 rushes, 33 yards

**Top receivers**

- NO – Nick Vannett – 3 receptions, 44 yards
- NYJ – Braxton Berrios – 6 receptions, 52 yards

The Saints break the five-game loss streak with the victory against the Jets. They improve to 6–7.

==== Week 15: at Tampa Bay Buccaneers ====
Week 15: New Orleans Saints at Tampa Bay Buccaneers – Game summary

Quarter	1	2	3	4	Total
**Saints**	3	3	0	3	**9**
Buccaneers	0	0	0	0	**0**

at Raymond James Stadium, Tampa, Florida

- Date: December 19
- Game time: 8:20 p.m. EST/7:20 p.m. CST
- Game weather: Cloudy, 75 °F (24 °C)
- Game attendance: 65,744
- Referee: John Hussey
- TV announcers (NBC): Mike Tirico, Cris Collinsworth, Michele Tafoya and Terry McAulay
- Recap, Game Book

Game information

**First quarter**

- NO – Brett Maher 39-yard field goal, 5:44. Saints 3–0. **Drive: 9 plays, 60 yards, 4:22.**

**Second quarter**

- NO – Brett Maher 35-yard field goal, 14:55. Saints 6–0. **Drive: 8 plays, 40 yards, 3:53.**

**Third quarter**

- No scoring plays.

**Fourth quarter**

- NO – Brett Maher 42-yard field goal, 7:28. Saints 9–0. **Drive: 10 plays, 42 yards, 4:33.**

**Top passers**

- NO – Taysom Hill – 13/27, 154 yards
- TB – Tom Brady – 26/48, 214 yards, INT

**Top rushers**

- NO – Taysom Hill – 11 rushes, 33 yards
- TB – Ronald Jones II – 8 rushes, 63 yards

**Top receivers**

- NO – Marquez Callaway – 6 receptions, 112 yards
- TB – Chris Godwin – 6 receptions, 49 yards

Despite the Buccaneers being the defending Super Bowl champions from last season, the Saints still swept them. With a rare shutout victory, they improve to 7–7.

==== Week 16: vs. Miami Dolphins ====
Week 16: Miami Dolphins at New Orleans Saints – Game summary

Quarter	1	2	3	4	Total
**Dolphins**	10	0	7	3	**20**
Saints	0	3	0	0	**3**

at Caesars Superdome, New Orleans, Louisiana

- Date: December 27
- Game time: 7:15 p.m. CST
- Game weather: None (indoor stadium)
- Game attendance: 69,170
- Referee: Adrian Hill
- TV announcers (ESPN): Steve Levy, Brian Griese, Louis Riddick, Laura Rutledge, and John Parry
- Recap, Game Book

Game information

**First quarter**

- MIA – Nik Needham 28-yard interception return (Jason Sanders kick), 10:25. Dolphins 7–0.
- MIA – Jason Sanders 48-yard field goal, 2:09. Dolphins 10–0. **Drive: 12 plays, 39 yards, 6:42.**

**Second quarter**

- NO – Brett Maher 38-yard field goal, 2:45. Dolphins 10–3. **Drive: 8 plays, 55 yards, 4:39.**

**Third quarter**

- MIA – Jaylen Waddle 1-yard pass from Tua Tagovailoa (Jason Sanders kick), 5:10. Dolphins 17–3. **Drive: 9 plays, 86 yards, 4:30.**

**Fourth quarter**

- MIA – Jason Sanders 34-yard field goal, 12:05. Dolphins 20–3. **Drive: 6 plays, 22 yards, 2:12.**

**Top passers**

- MIA – Tua Tagovailoa – 19/26, 198 yards, TD, INT
- NO – Ian Book – 12/20, 135 yards, 2 INT

**Top rushers**

- MIA – Duke Johnson – 13 rushes, 39 yards
- NO – Alvin Kamara – 13 rushes, 52 yards

**Top receivers**

- MIA – Jaylen Waddle – 10 receptions, 92 yards, TD
- NO – Lil'Jordan Humphrey – 3 receptions, 70 yards

For the first time since the 2005 season, the Saints lost to the Dolphins. This was due, in part, to at least 20 players being on the COVID-19 reserve list. This dropped them to 7–8.

==== Week 17: vs. Carolina Panthers ====
Week 17: Carolina Panthers at New Orleans Saints – Game summary

Quarter	1	2	3	4	Total
Panthers	3	7	0	0	**10**
**Saints**	3	6	3	6	**18**

at Caesars Superdome, New Orleans, Louisiana

- Date: January 2
- Game time: 3:25 p.m. CST
- Game weather: None (indoor stadium)
- Game attendance: 69,170
- Referee: Jerome Boger
- TV announcers (Fox): Brandon Gaudin, Matt Millen, and Sarah Kustok
- Recap, Game Book

Game information

**First quarter**

- CAR – Lirim Hajrullahu 32-yard field goal, 8:05. Panthers 3–0. **Drive: 12 plays, 61 yards, 6:55.**
- NO – Brett Maher 41-yard field goal, 4:05. Tied 3–3. **Drive: 8 plays, 52 yards, 4:00.**

**Second quarter**

- CAR – Chuba Hubbard 21-yard run (Lirim Hajrullahu kick), 13:09. Panthers 10–3. **Drive: 10 plays, 81 yards, 5:56.**
- NO – Brett Maher 27-yard field goal, 8:41. Panthers 10–6. **Drive: 4 plays, 4 yards, 1:25.**
- NO – Brett Maher 41-yard field goal, 0:00. Panthers 10–9. **Drive: 10 plays, 73 yards, 1:53.**

**Third quarter**

- NO – Brett Maher 33-yard field goal, 2:07. Saints 12–10. **Drive: 6 plays, 23 yards, 2:10.**

**Fourth quarter**

- NO – Alvin Kamara 12-yard pass from Taysom Hill (kick failed, hit right upright), 7:49. Saints 18–10. **Drive: 7 plays, 63 yards, 4:15.**

**Top passers**

- CAR – Sam Darnold – 17/26, 132 yards, INT
- NO – Taysom Hill – 17/28, 222 yards, TD

**Top rushers**

- CAR – Chuba Hubbard – 17 rushes, 55 yards, TD
- NO – Taysom Hill – 12 rushes, 45 yards

**Top receivers**

- CAR – Ian Thomas – 3 receptions, 33 yards
- NO – Marquez Callaway – 6 receptions, 97 yards

Meeting the Panthers again from a 26-7 loss in Week 2, the Saints defeated the Panthers under Taysom Hill. They improved to 8–8.

==== Week 18: at Atlanta Falcons ====
Week 18: New Orleans Saints at Atlanta Falcons – Game summary

Quarter	1	2	3	4	Total
**Saints**	7	17	0	6	**30**
Falcons	3	3	7	7	**20**

at Mercedes-Benz Stadium, Atlanta, Georgia

- Date: January 9
- Game time: 4:25 p.m. EST/3:25 p.m. CST
- Game weather: None (retractable roof closed)
- Game attendance: 68,336
- Referee: Craig Wrolstad
- TV announcers (Fox): Kevin Kugler, Mark Sanchez and Laura Okmin
- Recap, Game Book

Game information

**First quarter**

- NO – Adam Trautman 18-yard pass from Taysom Hill (Brett Maher kick), 8:29. Saints 7–0. **Drive: 10 plays, 84 yards, 6:31.**
- ATL – Younghoe Koo 48-yard field goal, 3:15. Saints 7–3. **Drive: 10 plays, 45 yards, 5:14.**

**Second quarter**

- ATL – Younghoe Koo 54-yard field goal, 10:31. Saints 7–6. **Drive: 7 plays, 40 yards, 2:58.**
- NO – Tre'Quan Smith 13-yard pass from Trevor Siemian (Brett Maher kick), 5:47. Saints 14–6. **Drive: 9 plays, 73 yards, 4:44.**
- NO – Brett Maher 37-yard field goal, 1:03. Saints 17–6. **Drive: 9 plays, 36 yards, 4:26.**
- NO – Juwan Johnson 5-yard pass from Trevor Siemian (Brett Maher kick), 0:02. Saints 24–6. **Drive: 3 plays, 11 yards, 0:50.**

**Third quarter**

- ATL – Qadree Ollison 19-yard run (Younghoe Koo kick), 2:49. Saints 24–13. **Drive: 4 plays, 56 yards, 1:09.**

**Fourth quarter**

- NO – Brett Maher 27-yard field goal, 10:55. Saints 27–13. **Drive: 13 plays, 66 yards, 6:54.**
- NO – Brett Maher 33-yard field goal, 7:36. Saints 30–13. **Drive: 7 plays, 14 yards, 3:06.**
- ATL – Russell Gage 1-yard pass from Matt Ryan (Younghoe Koo kick), 0:21. Saints 30–20. **Drive: 13 plays, 85 yards, 3:56.**

**Top passers**

- NO – Taysom Hill – 7/9, 107 yards, TD
- ATL – Matt Ryan – 20/33, 216 yards, TD, INT

**Top rushers**

- NO – Alvin Kamara – 30 rushes, 146 yards
- ATL – Mike Davis – 6 rushes, 30 yards

**Top receivers**

- NO – Tre'Quan Smith – 5 receptions, 76 yards, TD
- ATL – Russell Gage – 9 receptions, 126 yards, TD

Previously, the Saints lost to the Falcons by two points in Week 9. Despite winning the game, the team was eliminated from the playoffs when the 49ers defeated the Rams, claiming the final playoff spot. They finished with a 9–8 record and maintained a winning season, despite not making the playoffs. Taysom Hill also got hurt, prompting Trevor Siemian to start for the remainder of the game. Paulson Adebo stuns the Falcons with a one-handed interception.

=== Standings ===
==== Division ====
NFC South
	W	L	T	PCT	DIV	CONF	PF	PA	STK
^{(2)} Tampa Bay Buccaneers	13	4	0	.765	4–2	8–4	511	353	W3
New Orleans Saints	9	8	0	.529	4–2	7–5	364	335	W2
Atlanta Falcons	7	10	0	.412	2–4	4–8	313	459	L2
Carolina Panthers	5	12	0	.294	2–4	3–9	304	404	L7

==== Conference ====
NFC
#	Team	Division	W	L	T	PCT	DIV	CONF	SOS	SOV	STK
**Division winners**
1 (Note: Green Bay finished ahead of Tampa Bay based on conference record (9–3 vs. 8–4), claiming the No. 1 seed.)	Green Bay Packers	North	13	4	0	.765	4–2	9–3	.479	.480	L1
2	Tampa Bay Buccaneers	South	13	4	0	.765	4–2	8–4	.467	.443	W3
3 (Note: Dallas claimed the No. 3 seed over LA Rams based on conference record (10–2 vs. 8–4).)	Dallas Cowboys	East	12	5	0	.706	6–0	10–2	.488	.431	W1
4	Los Angeles Rams	West	12	5	0	.706	3–3	8–4	.483	.409	L1
**Wild cards**
5	Arizona Cardinals	West	11	6	0	.647	4–2	7–5	.490	.492	L1
6	San Francisco 49ers	West	10	7	0	.588	2–4	7–5	.500	.438	W2
7 (Note: Philadelphia finished ahead of New Orleans based on head-to-head victory, claiming the 7th and final playoff spot.)	Philadelphia Eagles	East	9	8	0	.529	3–3	7–5	.469	.350	L1
**Did not qualify for the postseason**
8	New Orleans Saints	South	9	8	0	.529	4–2	7–5	.512	.516	W2
9	Minnesota Vikings	North	8	9	0	.471	4–2	6–6	.507	.434	W1
10 (Note: Washington finished ahead of Atlanta and Seattle based on head-to-head victories.)	Washington Football Team	East	7	10	0	.412	2–4	6–6	.529	.420	W1
11 (Note: Seattle finished ahead of Atlanta based on win percentage in common games (4–2 vs. 3–3 against: San Francisco, New Orleans, Jacksonville, Washington, and Detroit).)	Seattle Seahawks	West	7	10	0	.412	3–3	4–8	.519	.424	W2
12	Atlanta Falcons	South	7	10	0	.412	2–4	4–8	.472	.315	L2
13	Chicago Bears	North	6	11	0	.353	2–4	4–8	.524	.373	L1
14	Carolina Panthers	South	5	12	0	.294	2–4	3–9	.509	.412	L7
15	New York Giants	East	4	13	0	.235	1–5	3–9	.536	.485	L6
16	Detroit Lions	North	3	13	1	.206	2–4	3–9	.528	.627	W1
**Tiebreakers** (Note: When breaking ties for three or more teams under the NFL's rules, they are first broken within divisions, then comparing only the highest-ranked remaining team from each division.)
