= Lil'Jordan Humphrey =

American football player (born 1998)

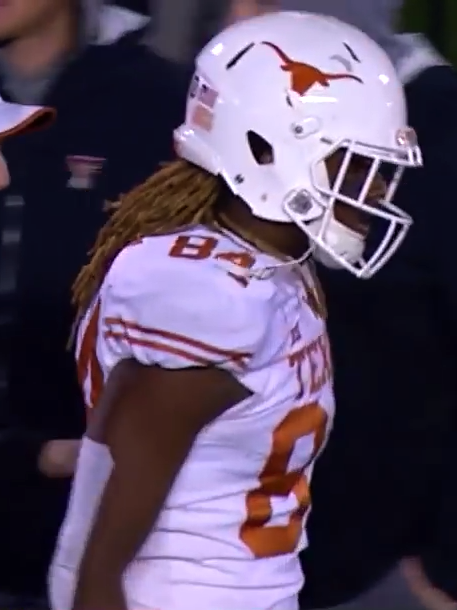
- Humphrey with the Texas Longhorns in 2018

No. 5 – Denver Broncos
- Position: Wide receiver
- Roster status: Active

Personal information
- Born: April 19, 1998 (age 28); Southlake, Texas, U.S.
- Listed height: 6 ft 4 in (1.93 m)
- Listed weight: 225 lb (102 kg)

Career information
- High school: Carroll (Southlake)
- College: Texas (2016–2018)
- NFL draft: 2019: undrafted

Career history
- New Orleans Saints (2019–2021); New England Patriots (2022); Denver Broncos (2023–2024); New York Giants (2025); Denver Broncos (2025–present)

Career NFL statistics as of Week 5, 2026
- Receptions: 76
- Receiving yards: 934
- Receiving touchdowns: 8
- Stats at Pro Football Reference

Lil'Jordan Humphrey (born April 19, 1998) is an American professional football wide receiver for the Denver Broncos of the National Football League (NFL). He played college football for the Texas Longhorns and was signed by the New Orleans Saints as an undrafted free agent in 2019. He has also previously played in the NFL for the New England Patriots and New York Giants.

== Early life ==
Humphrey attended Texas high school football powerhouse, Carroll Senior High School, in Southlake, Texas. He played running back and wide receiver for the Dragons high school football team. He received numerous offers, including from Texas, Wisconsin, California, Iowa, Ole Miss, Oregon State, Texas Tech, UCF, and Washington. He committed to the University of Texas to play college football.

== College career ==
Humphrey played in 10 games as a true freshman at Texas in 2016, recording two receptions for 15 yards. As a sophomore in 2017, he played in 12 games with six starts and had 37 receptions for 431 yards and one touchdown. As a junior, Humphrey had 86 receptions for 1,176 yards and nine touchdowns. After the season, he entered the 2019 NFL draft.

== Professional career ==
Pre-draft measurables
Height	Weight	Arm length	Hand span	Wingspan	40-yard dash	10-yard split	20-yard split	20-yard shuttle	Three-cone drill	Vertical jump	Broad jump	Bench press
6 ft 3 5/8 in (1.92 m)	210 lb (95 kg)	32 3/4 in (0.83 m)	9 1/2 in (0.24 m)	6 ft 6 3/4 in (2.00 m)	4.75 s	1.55 s	2.77 s	4.29 s	7.09 s	33.5 in (0.85 m)	9 ft 11 in (3.02 m)	13 reps
All values from NFL Combine

=== New Orleans Saints ===
Humphrey was signed by the New Orleans Saints as an undrafted free agent following the 2019 NFL draft. He was waived on August 31, 2019, and was signed to the practice squad the next day. Humphrey was promoted to the active roster on September 18. He was waived on October 26 and re-signed to the practice squad. Humphrey was promoted again to the active roster on December 28.

On September 5, 2020, Humphrey was waived by the Saints and signed to the practice squad the next day. He was placed on the practice squad/injured list on September 30, and restored to the practice squad on December 9. He was elevated to the active roster on December 19, December 24, and January 2, 2021, for the team's weeks 15, 16, and 17 games against the Kansas City Chiefs, Minnesota Vikings, and Carolina Panthers, and reverted to the practice squad after each game. In the Chiefs game, he recorded two catches for 29 yards and his first career touchdown reception during the 32–29 loss. He was elevated again on January 9 for the Wild Card Round against the Chicago Bears, and reverted to the practice squad again following the game. On January 18, Humphrey signed a reserve/futures contract with the Saints.

In the 2021 season, Humphrey had 13 receptions for 249 receiving yards and two receiving touchdowns.

On March 16, 2022, it was reported that Humphrey would be returning to the Saints as a restricted free-agent. However, a failed physical voided the Saints offer.

=== New England Patriots ===
On June 16, 2022, Humphrey signed a one-year deal with the New England Patriots. He was waived on August 30, and signed to the practice squad the next day. He was promoted to the active roster on September 13. He was waived on October 11 and re-signed to the practice squad. He was elevated to the active roster on October 15, via a standard elevation which caused him to revert back to the practice squad after the game. He was released from the practice squad on November 15. He appeared in six games and started two in the 2022 season.

=== Denver Broncos (first stint) ===
On March 7, 2023, Humphrey signed with the Denver Broncos. He was released on August 29, and re-signed to the practice squad. Following an injury to safety Caden Sterns during the season opener against the Las Vegas Raiders, Humphrey was signed to the Broncos active roster on September 13. He was released on October 11, but was re-signed to the practice squad the next day, as well as being elevated to the roster on Thursday Night Football vs the Kansas City Chiefs. In the 2023 season, he had 13 receptions for 162 yards and three touchdowns.

On March 14, 2024, Humphrey re-signed with the Broncos. On August 27, the Broncos released Humphrey. The next day, he was re-signed to the practice squad. On September 21, Humphrey was promoted to the active roster following an injury to Baron Browning in Week 2. In the 2024 season, he had 31 receptions for 293 yards and one touchdown.

=== New York Giants ===
On March 21, 2025, Humphrey signed a one-year contract with the New York Giants. He was released on August 26 as part of final roster cuts. The next day, he was re-signed to the practice squad. On October 9, Humphrey was elevated to the active roster ahead of the team's Week 6 game against the Philadelphia Eagles. In that game, he had the second-most receiving yards on his team, catching four passes for 55 yards.

=== Denver Broncos (second stint) ===
On November 12, 2025, Humphrey was signed off the Giants' practice squad by the Denver Broncos.

On March 12, 2026, Humphrey re-signed with the Broncos on a one-year contract. On September 14, he was released by the Broncos in a procedural move, but re-signed with the team the next day. On October 2, Humphrey was released once again and re-signed to the practice squad. On October 9, he was promoted to the active roster.

== Career statistics ==
=== NFL ===
Legend
**Bold**	Career High

==== Regular season ====
Year	Team	Games		Receiving					Rushing					Fumbles	
Year	Team	GP	GS	Rec	Yds	Avg	Lng	TD	Att	Yds	Avg	Lng	TD	Fum	Lost
2019	NO	5	1	0	0	0	0	0	0	0	0.0	0	0	0	0
2020	NO	3	1	3	46	15.3	17	1	0	0	0.0	0	0	0	0
2021	NO	10	4	13	249	**19.2**	**56**	2	0	0	0.0	0	0	0	0
2022	NE	6	2	2	20	10.0	11	0	0	0	0.0	0	0	0	0
2023	DEN	17	8	13	162	12.5	54	**3**	0	0	0.0	0	0	0	0
2024	DEN	17	7	**31**	**293**	9.5	41	1	0	0	0.0	0	0	2	1
2025	NYG	3	2	4	55	13.8	34	0	0	0	0.0	0	0	0	0
2025	DEN	7	2	9	101	11.2	22	1	0	0	0.0	0	0	0	0
Career		68	27	75	926	12.3	56	8	0	0	0.0	0	0	2	1

==== Postseason ====
Year	Team	Games		Receiving					Rushing					Fumbles	
Year	Team	GP	GS	Rec	Yds	Avg	Lng	TD	Att	Yds	Avg	Lng	TD	Fum	Lost
2019	NO	1	0	0	0	0.0	0	0	0	0	0.0	0	0	0	0
2020	NO	1	0	1	14	14.0	14	0	0	0	0.0	0	0	0	0
2024	DEN	1	1	0	0	0.0	0	0	0	0	0.0	0	0	0	0
2025	DEN	1	0	**2**	**33**	**16.5**	**29**	**1**	0	0	0.0	0	0	0	0
Career		4	1	3	47	15.7	29	1	0	0	0.0	0	0	0	0

=== College ===
Year	Team	GP	Receiving				Rushing			Kick returns			
Year	Team	GP	Rec	Yds	Avg	TD	Att	Yds	TD	Ret	Yds	Avg	TD
2016	Texas	10	2	15	7.5	0	0	0	0	0	0	0	0
2017	Texas	12	37	431	11.6	1	6	41	1	3	61	20.3	0
2018	Texas	14	86	1,176	13.7	9	6	25	1	10	215	21.5	0
Career		28	125	1,622	13.0	10	12	66	2	13	276	21.2	0
