= Marquez Callaway =

American football player (born 1998)

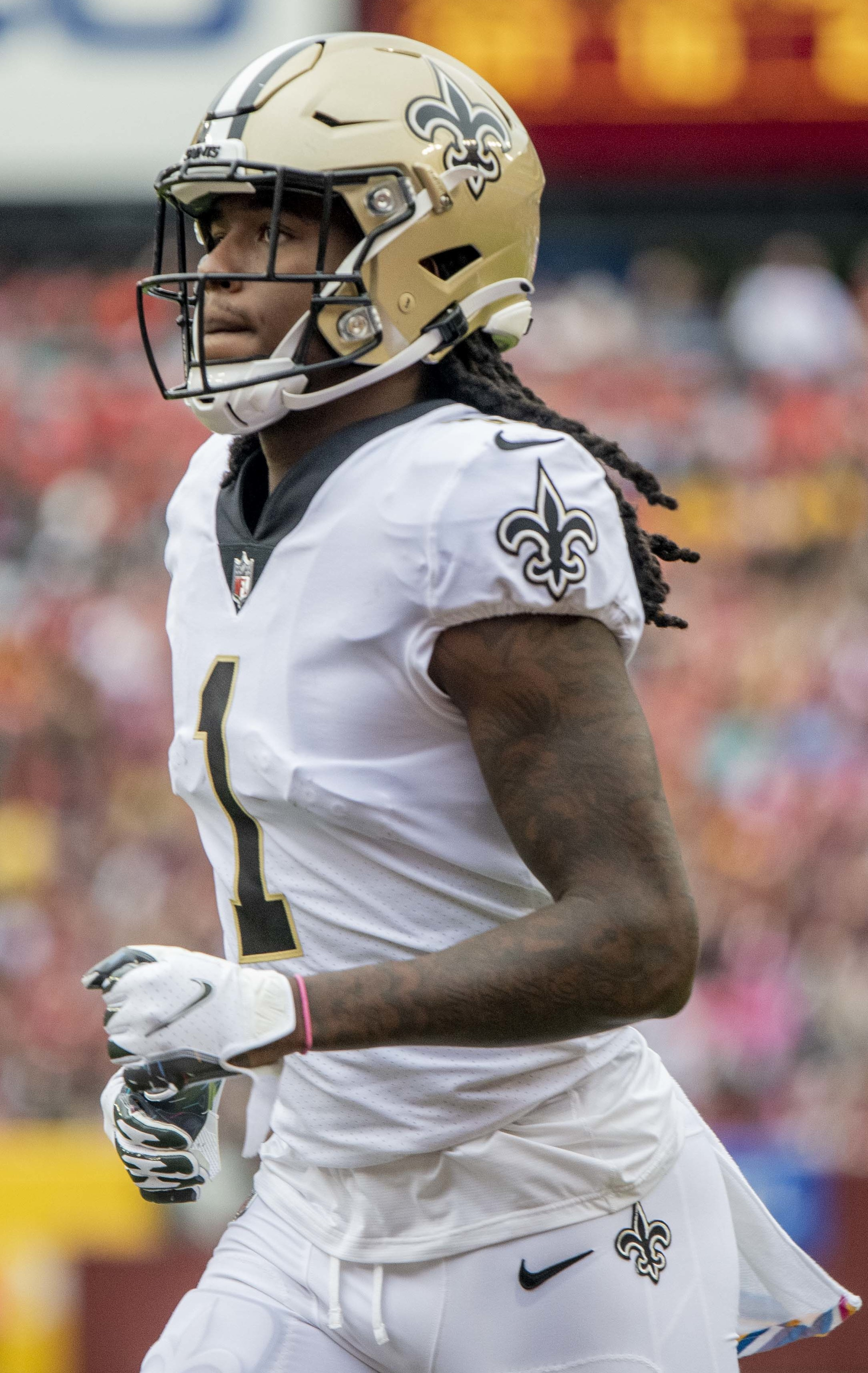
- Callaway with the New Orleans Saints in 2021

Profile
- Position: Wide receiver

Personal information
- Born: March 27, 1998 (age 28); Warner Robins, Georgia, U.S.
- Listed height: 6 ft 1 in (1.85 m)
- Listed weight: 205 lb (93 kg)

Career information
- High school: Warner Robins
- College: Tennessee (2016–2019)
- NFL draft: 2020: undrafted

Career history
- New Orleans Saints (2020–2022); Denver Broncos (2023)*; Las Vegas Raiders (2023)*; New Orleans Saints (2023); Pittsburgh Steelers (2024)*; New Orleans Saints (2024)*; Tampa Bay Buccaneers (2024)*; San Francisco 49ers (2025)*; Las Vegas Raiders (2025)*; BC Lions (2026)*
- * Offseason or practice squad member only

Awards and highlights
- Second-team All-SEC (2019)

Career NFL statistics
- Receptions: 83
- Receiving yards: 1,069
- Receiving touchdowns: 7
- Return yards: 243
- Stats at Pro Football Reference

Marquez Antonio Callaway (born March 27, 1998) is an American professional football wide receiver who is currently a free agent. He played college football for the Tennessee Volunteers and began his NFL career with the New Orleans Saints.

== Early life ==
Callaway attended Warner Robins High School in Warner Robins, Georgia, where he was a dual-sport athlete in football and basketball. A 4-star recruit, Callaway committed to Tennessee to play college football over offers from Alabama, Florida, Georgia, Michigan State, and Notre Dame, among others.

In addition to his football success, Callaway was also a key contributor to the Warner Robins basketball team, where he displayed leadership and athletic ability on the court. Former coaches and teammates described him as a humble and hard-working student-athlete who was well-liked by the community.

== College career ==
Callaway played at the University of Tennessee from 2016 to 2019 under head coaches Butch Jones and Jeremy Pruitt. Callaway had 92 receptions for 1,646 yards and 13 receiving touchdowns in his four seasons at Tennessee.

== Professional career ==
Pre-draft measurables
Height	Weight	Arm length	Hand span	Wingspan	40-yard dash	10-yard split	20-yard split	Vertical jump	Broad jump
6 ft 1 1/4 in (1.86 m)	205 lb (93 kg)	32 3/8 in (0.82 m)	9 3/8 in (0.24 m)	6 ft 6 7/8 in (2.00 m)	4.55 s	1.58 s	2.64 s	38.0 in (0.97 m)	10 ft 6 in (3.20 m)
All values from NFL Combine

=== New Orleans Saints (first stint) ===
On April 27, 2020, Callaway signed with the New Orleans Saints as an undrafted free agent after the 2020 NFL draft. He made his NFL debut in Week 2 against the Las Vegas Raiders playing on offense and special teams. In Week 4 against the Detroit Lions, he had his first professional reception on a 16-yard catch in the 35–29 victory. In a Week 5 matchup against the Los Angeles Chargers, Callaway was targeted six times and made four receptions for 34 yards.

On October 25, 2020, in a game against the Carolina Panthers, Callaway caught Drew Brees’ 7,000th completion. He finished the game with eight receptions for 75 yards, both team highs. He was placed on injured reserve on December 5, 2020. He was activated on December 24. As a rookie, he appeared in 11 games, of which he started three. He finished his rookie season with 21 receptions for 213 receiving yards.

Callaway's role expanded in the 2021 season. He scored his first professional receiving touchdown on a seven-yard reception from Jameis Winston in the 28–13 victory over the New England Patriots in Week 3. In Week 5, against the Washington Football Team, he had his first multi-touchdown game in the 33–22 victory. In Week 15, against the Tampa Bay Buccaneers, he had six receptions for 112 receiving yards in the 9–0 victory. On the 2021 season, Callaway appeared in all 17 games. He finished with 46 receptions for 698 receiving yards and six receiving touchdowns.

In the 2022 season, Callaway appeared in 14 games. He finished with 16 receptions for 158 receiving yards and one receiving touchdown. Callaway did not receive a qualifying offer following the 2022 season and became a free agent on March 15, 2023.

=== Denver Broncos ===
On March 24, 2023, Callaway signed with the Denver Broncos. He was waived by the Broncos on August 29.

=== Las Vegas Raiders ===
On August 30, 2023, Callaway signed with the practice squad of the Las Vegas Raiders. He was released on October 10.

=== New Orleans Saints (second stint) ===
On November 21, 2023, Callaway was signed to the Saints' practice squad. He appeared in three games for the Saints in the 2023 season. He was not signed to a reserve/future contract and thus became a free agent at the end of the season.

=== Pittsburgh Steelers ===
On January 17, 2024, Callaway signed a reserve/futures contract with the Pittsburgh Steelers. On July 30, Callaway was released by the Steelers.

=== New Orleans Saints (third stint) ===
On August 1, 2024, Callaway signed with the New Orleans Saints. On August 11, Callaway was released by the Saints.

=== Tampa Bay Buccaneers ===
On October 16, 2024, Callaway was signed to the Tampa Bay Buccaneers' practice squad. He signed a reserve/future contract on January 14, 2025.

On April 29, 2025, Callaway was released by the Buccaneers.

=== San Francisco 49ers ===
On July 31, 2025, Callaway signed with the San Francisco 49ers. On August 3, Callaway was released by the 49ers.

=== Las Vegas Raiders (second stint) ===
On August 11, 2025, Callaway signed with the Las Vegas Raiders. He was released by the Raiders on August 25.

=== BC Lions ===
On February 3, 2026, Callaway signed with the BC Lions of the Canadian Football League (CFL). On May 12, Callaway was released by the Lions as part of their initial round of preseason roster cuts.

== Career statistics ==
=== NFL ===
Year	Team	Games		Receiving					Kickoff return					Punt return					Fumbles	
Year	Team	GP	GS	Rec	Yds	Avg	Lng	TD	Ret	Yds	Avg	Lng	TD	Ret	Yds	Avg	Lng	TD	Fum	Lost
2020	NO	11	3	21	213	10.1	27	0	4	94	23.5	29	0	11	122	11.1	19	0	0	0
2021	NO	17	11	46	698	15.2	58	6	0	0	0.0	0	0	1	2	2.0	2	0	0	0
2022	NO	14	3	16	158	9.9	33	1	0	0	0.0	0	0	2	25	12.5	21	0	0	0
2023	NO	3	0	0	0	0.0	0	0	0	0	0.0	0	0	0	0	0.0	0	0	0	0
Career		45	17	83	1,069	12.9	58	7	4	94	23.5	29	0	14	149	10.6	21	0	0	0

=== College ===
Season	Team	GP	Receiving			
Season	Team	GP	Rec	Yds	Avg	TD
2016	Tennessee	1	1	13	13.0	0
2017	Tennessee	10	24	406	16.9	5
2018	Tennessee	11	37	592	16.0	2
2019	Tennessee	13	30	635	21.2	6
Career		35	92	1,646	17.9	13
