= J. T. Gray =

American football player (born 1996)

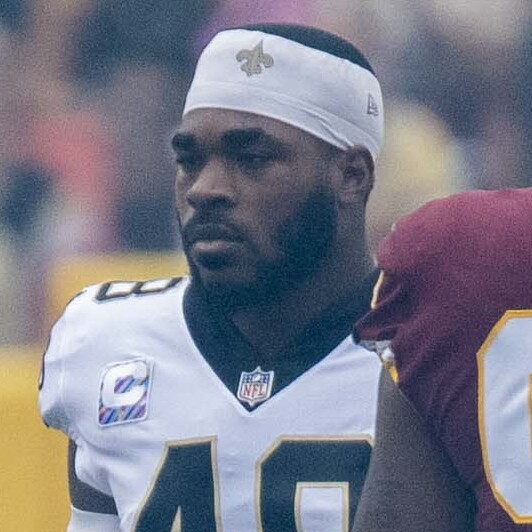
- Gray with the New Orleans Saints in 2021

Profile
- Positions: Safety, special teamer

Personal information
- Born: January 18, 1996 (age 30); Clarksdale, Mississippi, U.S.
- Listed height: 6 ft 0 in (1.83 m)
- Listed weight: 202 lb (92 kg)

Career information
- High school: Clarksdale
- College: Mississippi State (2014–2017)
- NFL draft: 2018: undrafted

Career history
- New Orleans Saints (2018–2024); Baltimore Ravens (2025)*; Denver Broncos (2025); Tampa Bay Buccaneers (2025); Philadelphia Eagles (2026)*
- * Offseason or practice squad member only

Awards and highlights
- First-team All-Pro (2021); 2× Second-team All-Pro (2019, 2024); Pro Bowl (2021)

Career NFL statistics as of 2025
- Total tackles: 106
- Sacks: 2.5
- Forced fumbles: 1
- Fumble recoveries: 3
- Pass deflections: 1
- Stats at Pro Football Reference

Juantavius Tavon "J. T." Gray (born January 18, 1996) is an American professional football safety and special teamer. He played college football for the Mississippi State Bulldogs, and has previously played in the NFL for the New Orleans Saints, for whom he was named a Pro Bowler in 2021. He has also played for the Denver Broncos.

== Professional career ==
Pre-draft measurables
Height	Weight	Arm length	Hand span	Wingspan	40-yard dash	10-yard split	20-yard split	20-yard shuttle	Three-cone drill	Vertical jump	Broad jump	Bench press
5 ft 11 1/4 in (1.81 m)	195 lb (88 kg)	32 1/2 in (0.83 m)	8 3/4 in (0.22 m)	6 ft 2 7/8 in (1.90 m)	4.50 s	1.59 s	2.56 s	4.19 s	7.03 s	33.5 in (0.85 m)	10 ft 3 in (3.12 m)	19 reps
All values from Pro Day

=== New Orleans Saints ===
Gray signed with the New Orleans Saints as an undrafted free agent on May 3, 2018. He played in five games, primarily playing on special teams, before being waived on November 13, 2018, and re-signed to the practice squad. He signed a reserve/future contract with the Saints on January 21, 2019.

In 2019, Gray played in all 16 games as a core special-teamer. He tied for the league-lead with 16 special teams tackles and was named second-team All-Pro as a special teamer.

On March 3, 2021, Gray signed a two-year, $4 million contract extension with the Saints. Gray was elected captain for the 2021 season.

On March 10, 2023, Gray signed a three-year contract extension with the Saints.

On September 1, 2025, Gray was released by the Saints after seven seasons.

=== Baltimore Ravens ===
Gray signed with the Baltimore Ravens' practice squad on September 3, 2025.

=== Denver Broncos ===
On October 13, 2025, the Denver Broncos signed Gray off the Ravens' practice squad to bolster their struggling special teams unit, reuniting him with head coach Sean Payton. After playing in one game, he was released with an injury settlement on November 4.

=== Tampa Bay Buccaneers ===
On November 21, 2025, Gray signed with the Tampa Bay Buccaneers' practice squad. He was promoted to the active roster on December 19.

=== Philadelphia Eagles ===
On March 21, 2026, Gray signed a one-year contract with the Philadelphia Eagles. On August 24, Gray was waived by the Eagles.
