= Nolan Cooney =

American football player (born 1996)

Profile
- Position: Punter

Personal information
- Born: September 18, 1996 (age 30)
- Listed height: 6 ft 3 in (1.91 m)
- Listed weight: 202 lb (92 kg)

Career information
- High school: East Greenwich (RI)
- College: Syracuse
- NFL draft: 2021: undrafted

Career history
- New Orleans Saints (2021)*; Arizona Cardinals (2022)*; Indianapolis Colts (2022)*; Arizona Cardinals (2022–2023); Tampa Bay Buccaneers (2024)*
- * Offseason or practice squad member only

Awards and highlights
- ACC Brian Piccolo Award (2020)

Career NFL statistics as of Week 4, 2023
- Punts: 13
- Punting yards: 592
- Punting average: 45.5
- Longest punt: 56
- Inside 20: 2
- Stats at Pro Football Reference

Nolan Joseph Cooney (born September 18, 1996) is an American professional football punter. He played college football at Syracuse and has been a member of the New Orleans Saints, Arizona Cardinals and Indianapolis Colts.

== Early life and education ==
Cooney was born on September 18, 1996. He grew up in East Greenwich, Rhode Island, and attended East Greenwich High School. There, he played basketball, baseball and soccer. He played goalkeeper in soccer and that gave him the idea to play football as a punter. As a junior, he was diagnosed with testicular cancer. While undergoing chemotherapy treatment, Cooney watched YouTube videos about punters to learn more about how to play the position. He recovered as a senior, but was unable to play football as his school did not allow one to play both football and soccer at the same time. After graduating from there, he signed up for a postgraduate year at Bridgton Academy, where he played one season at punter.

Cooney did not receive any scholarship offers after his season at Bridgton, but was given a chance to make the Syracuse University football team as a walk-on. He made the team, but did not play in his first two years (2016, 2017). He saw his first collegiate action in 2018, serving as the holder for field goals and extra points. Cooney continued in this role for the 2019 season, his junior year.

As a fifth-year senior in 2020, Cooney received his first action as Syracuse punter. He recorded 74 punts averaging 44.8 yards, leading all of the FBS, and had 24 kicks downed inside the 20 compared to just three touchbacks. Cooney was an honorable mention All-American according to Pro Football Focus (PFF) and was a third-team all-conference selection. He was also named the winner of the Brian Piccolo Award, given to those the "most courageous player in the league," for overcoming his battle with cancer in high school.

== Professional career ==
Pre-draft measurables
Height	Weight	Arm length	Hand span
6 ft 2 1/4 in (1.89 m)	195 lb (88 kg)	31 3/4 in (0.81 m)	9 1/4 in (0.23 m)
All values from Pro Day

=== New Orleans Saints ===
After going unselected in the 2021 NFL draft, Cooney was signed by the New Orleans Saints as an undrafted free agent. He was waived during the roster cuts period in August.

=== Arizona Cardinals ===
In January 2022, after spending the entirety of the 2021 season as a free agent, Cooney was signed to a future contract by the Arizona Cardinals. He was released on August 23.

=== Indianapolis Colts ===
Shortly after being released by Arizona, Cooney had a tryout with the Indianapolis Colts. Although not signed at first, Cooney was brought to the Colts' practice squad on October 25, 2022, following a poor performance by the team's punter Matt Haack. After Haack performed better in the following game, Cooney was released on October 31.

=== Arizona Cardinals (second stint) ===
After Andy Lee was ruled questionable with an illness in Week 9, Cooney was re-signed by the Arizona Cardinals on November 5 to the practice squad and elevated to the active roster for their game with the Seattle Seahawks. He was released on November 9. He signed a reserve/future contract on January 11, 2023. He made the final roster by winning the position battle over Matt Haack. On October 3, after four games played, in which he recorded a total of 13 punts for 592 yards (a 45.5 average), he was released in favor of Blake Gillikin.

=== Tampa Bay Buccaneers ===
On August 12, 2024, Cooney signed with the Tampa Bay Buccaneers. He was waived on August 27.
