= Jordan Miller (cornerback) =

American football player (born 1997)

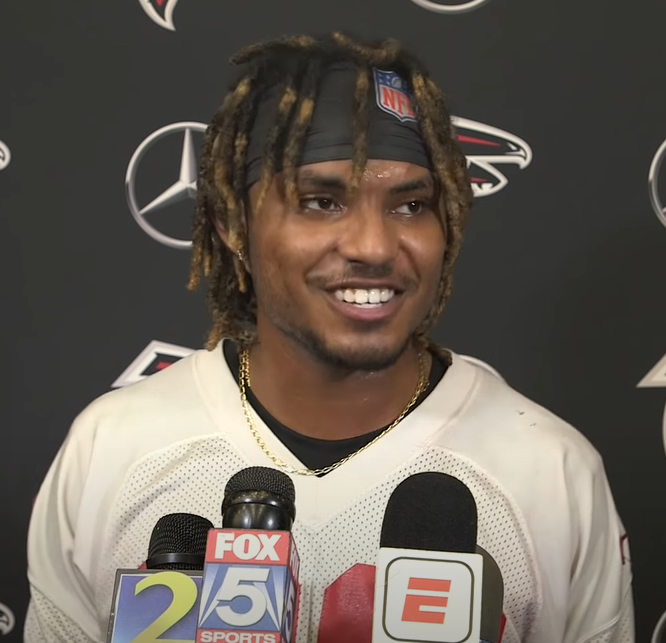
- Miller with the Atlanta Falcons in 2019

Profile
- Position: Cornerback

Personal information
- Born: February 8, 1997 (age 29); Oceanside, California, U.S.
- Listed height: 6 ft 2 in (1.88 m)
- Listed weight: 190 lb (86 kg)

Career information
- High school: Oceanside
- College: Washington (2015–2018)
- NFL draft: 2019: 5th round, 172nd overall pick

Career history
- Atlanta Falcons (2019–2020); Seattle Seahawks (2020–2021)*; New Orleans Saints (2021); Buffalo Bills (2022)*; Arizona Cardinals (2022)*; St. Louis BattleHawks (2023)*; Arlington Renegades (2023)
- * Offseason or practice squad member only

Awards and highlights
- XFL champion (2023)

Career NFL statistics
- Total tackles: 5
- Fumble recoveries: 1
- Stats at Pro Football Reference

Jordan Miller (born February 8, 1997) is an American professional football cornerback. He played college football at Washington. During his four years at Washington he compiled six interceptions and 18 pass deflections.

== Professional career ==
Pre-draft measurables
Height	Weight	Arm length	Hand span	Wingspan	40-yard dash	10-yard split	20-yard split	20-yard shuttle	Three-cone drill	Vertical jump	Broad jump	Bench press
6 ft 0 5/8 in (1.84 m)	186 lb (84 kg)	32 7/8 in (0.84 m)	9 5/8 in (0.24 m)	6 ft 4 1/2 in (1.94 m)	4.49 s	1.53 s	2.61 s	4.38 s	7.30 s	37.0 in (0.94 m)	10 ft 5 in (3.18 m)	6 reps
All values from NFL Combine/Pro Day

=== Atlanta Falcons ===
Miller was drafted by the Atlanta Falcons in the fifth round (172nd overall) of the 2019 NFL draft. On December 26, 2019, the NFL announced that Miller was suspended for four games for violating the league’s performance-enhancing substance policy. This suspension covered week 17 of the 2019 NFL season and the first three weeks of the 2020 season. He was reinstated from the 2020 portion of his suspension and activated on September 28, 2020. He was placed on injured reserve on November 7, 2020, with an oblique injury. He was designated to return from injured reserve on December 2, and began practicing with the team again. However, on December 22, 2020, Miller was waived from the injured reserve.

=== Seattle Seahawks ===
On January 6, 2021, Miller was signed to the practice squad of the Seattle Seahawks. On January 11, Miller signed a reserve/futures contract with the Seahawks. He was waived on August 16.

=== New Orleans Saints ===
On September 6, 2021, Miller was signed to the New Orleans Saints practice squad. He was promoted to the active roster on September 11. He was waived on September 13 and re-signed to the practice squad. He was promoted back to the active roster on September 18. He was released on September 20 and re-signed to the practice squad.

Miller signed a reserve/future contract with the Saints on January 11, 2022. He was waived on July 26.

=== Buffalo Bills ===
On July 30, 2022, Miller signed with the Buffalo Bills. He was released on August 29. He was re-signed to the practice squad on October 4. He was released on November 1.

=== Arizona Cardinals ===
On December 28, 2022, Miller signed with the practice squad of the Arizona Cardinals. On January 7, 2023, Miller was released by the Cardinals.

=== Arlington Renegades ===
Miller played for the Arlington Renegades of the XFL in 2023. On January 30, 2024, he was released by the Renegades.
