= Albert Huggins =

American football player (born 1997)

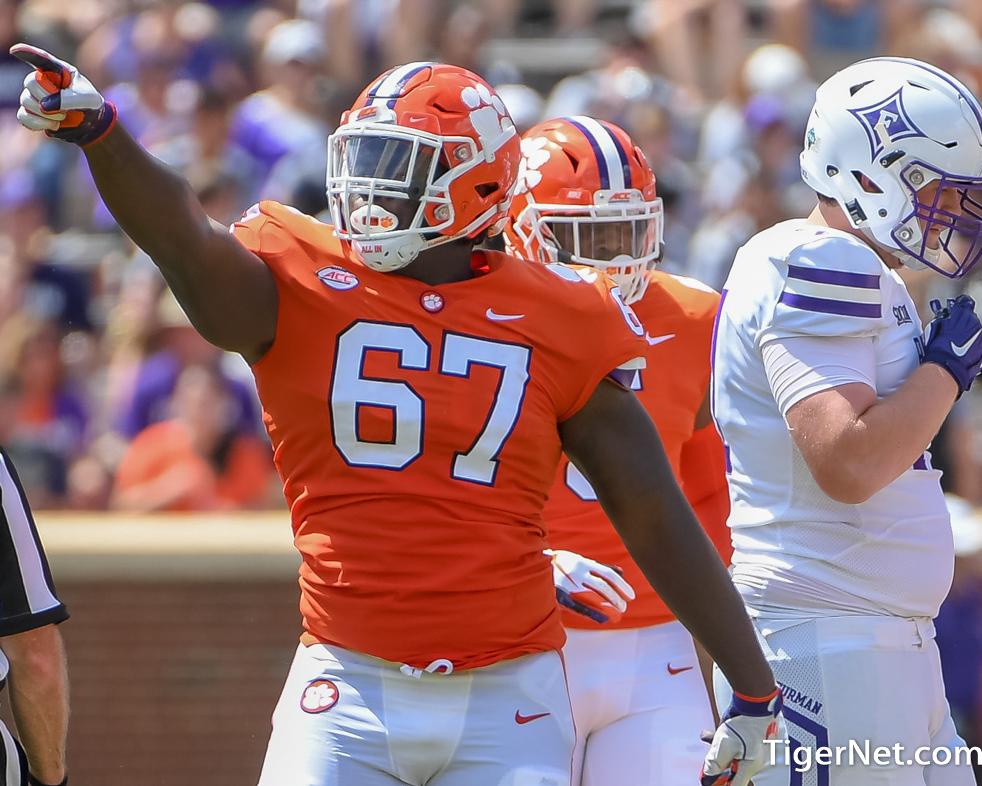
- Huggins with the Clemson Tigers in 2018

No. 76, 64, 60, 95, 94
- Position: Nose tackle

Personal information
- Born: June 27, 1997 (age 29); Orangeburg, South Carolina, U.S.
- Listed height: 6 ft 3 in (1.91 m)
- Listed weight: 305 lb (138 kg)

Career information
- High school: Orangeburg-Wilkinson
- College: Clemson (2015–2018)
- NFL draft: 2019: undrafted

Career history
- Houston Texans (2019)*; Philadelphia Eagles (2019); New England Patriots (2019); Philadelphia Eagles (2019–2020)*; Houston Texans (2020)*; Detroit Lions (2020)*; Minnesota Vikings (2020)*; Detroit Lions (2020); New Orleans Saints (2021–2022); Atlanta Falcons (2023); Dallas Cowboys (2024)*; St. Louis Battlehawks (2025)*
- * Offseason or practice squad member only

Awards and highlights
- 2× CFP national champion (2016, 2018)

Career NFL statistics
- Total tackles: 41
- Fumble recoveries: 1
- Stats at Pro Football Reference

Albert Huggins Jr. (born June 27, 1997) is an American former professional football player who was a nose tackle in the National Football League (NFL). After playing college football for the Clemson Tigers, he was signed by the Houston Texans as an undrafted free agent in 2019. He was also a member of the Philadelphia Eagles, New England Patriots, Detroit Lions, Minnesota Vikings, New Orleans Saints, Atlanta Falcons, Dallas Cowboys, and St. Louis Battlehawks.

== Professional career ==
Pre-draft measurables
Height	Weight	Arm length	Hand span	40-yard dash	10-yard split	20-yard split	20-yard shuttle	Three-cone drill	Vertical jump	Broad jump	Bench press
6 ft 2 7/8 in (1.90 m)	305 lb (138 kg)	33 1/2 in (0.85 m)	10 5/8 in (0.27 m)	5.12 s	1.81 s	2.98 s	4.78 s	7.56 s	28.5 in (0.72 m)	8 ft 6 in (2.59 m)	35 reps

=== Houston Texans (first stint) ===
Huggins signed with the Houston Texans as an undrafted free agent on May 10, 2019. He was waived during final roster cuts on August 31, 2019, but was signed to the team's practice squad on September 2.

=== Philadelphia Eagles (first stint) ===
On October 21, 2019, Huggins was signed by the Philadelphia Eagles off the Texans' practice squad. He was waived after playing in four games on November 30, 2019.

=== New England Patriots ===
On December 2, 2019, Huggins was claimed off waivers by the New England Patriots. He was waived on December 7, 2019.

=== Philadelphia Eagles (second stint) ===
On December 10, 2019, Huggins was signed to the Eagles practice squad. He signed a reserve/future contract with the Eagles on January 6, 2020. He was waived on July 26, 2020.

=== Houston Texans (second stint) ===
On July 27, 2020, Huggins was claimed off waivers by the Texans. He was waived on August 31, 2020.

=== Detroit Lions (first stint) ===
Huggins was claimed off waivers by the Detroit Lions on September 1, 2020, but was waived four days later.

=== Minnesota Vikings ===
On September 8, 2020, Huggins was signed to the Minnesota Vikings practice squad. He was released on October 9, 2020.

=== Detroit Lions (second stint) ===
On October 19, 2020, Huggins was signed to the Lions practice squad. He was released on October 29, and re-signed to the practice squad two days later. He was elevated to the active roster on November 25 and January 2, 2021, for the team's weeks 12 and 17 games against the Texans and Vikings, and reverted to the practice squad after each game.

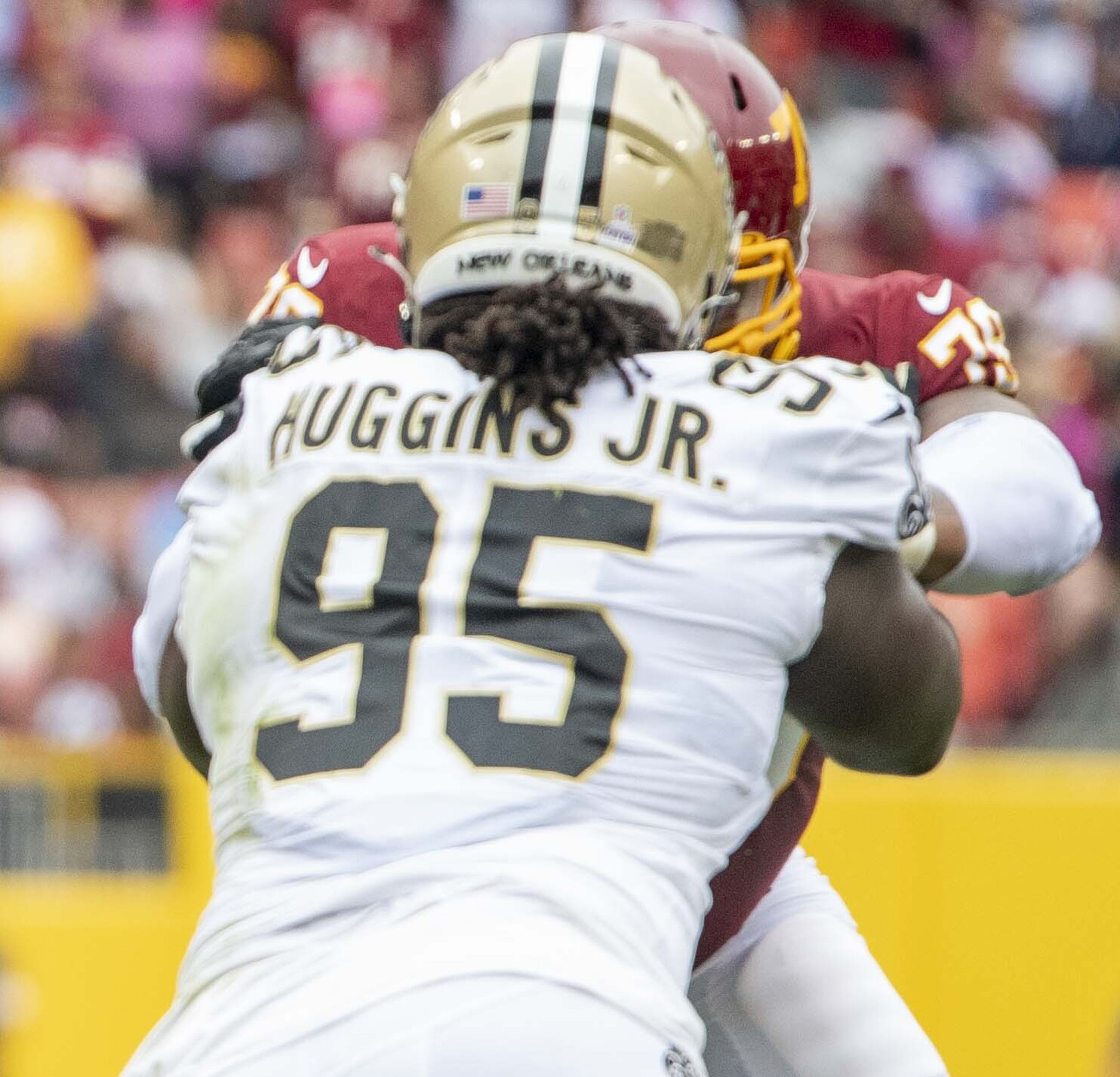
Huggins with the New Orleans Saints in 2021

=== New Orleans Saints ===
On May 6, 2021, Huggins signed with the New Orleans Saints. He was waived on August 31, 2021, and re-signed to the practice squad. Huggins was signed to the active roster on September 11, 2021. He was waived on October 25 and re-signed to the practice squad. He was promoted to the active roster on December 2.

On August 30, 2022, Huggins was placed on injured reserve. He spent the entire 2022 season on the IR with an undisclosed injury he suffered during the Saints’ final preseason game. He did not receive a qualifying offer from the Saints following the season and became a free agent on March 15, 2023.

=== Atlanta Falcons ===
On June 16, 2023, Huggins signed with the Atlanta Falcons. He played in 13 games with five starts, recording 22 tackles as a rotational defensive tackle.

=== Dallas Cowboys ===
On August 6, 2024, Huggins signed with the Dallas Cowboys. He was waived on August 26.

=== St. Louis Battlehawks ===
On March 3, 2025, Huggins signed with the St. Louis Battlehawks of the United Football League (UFL).He was released on March 20, 2025.
