= Will Clapp =

American football player (born 1995)

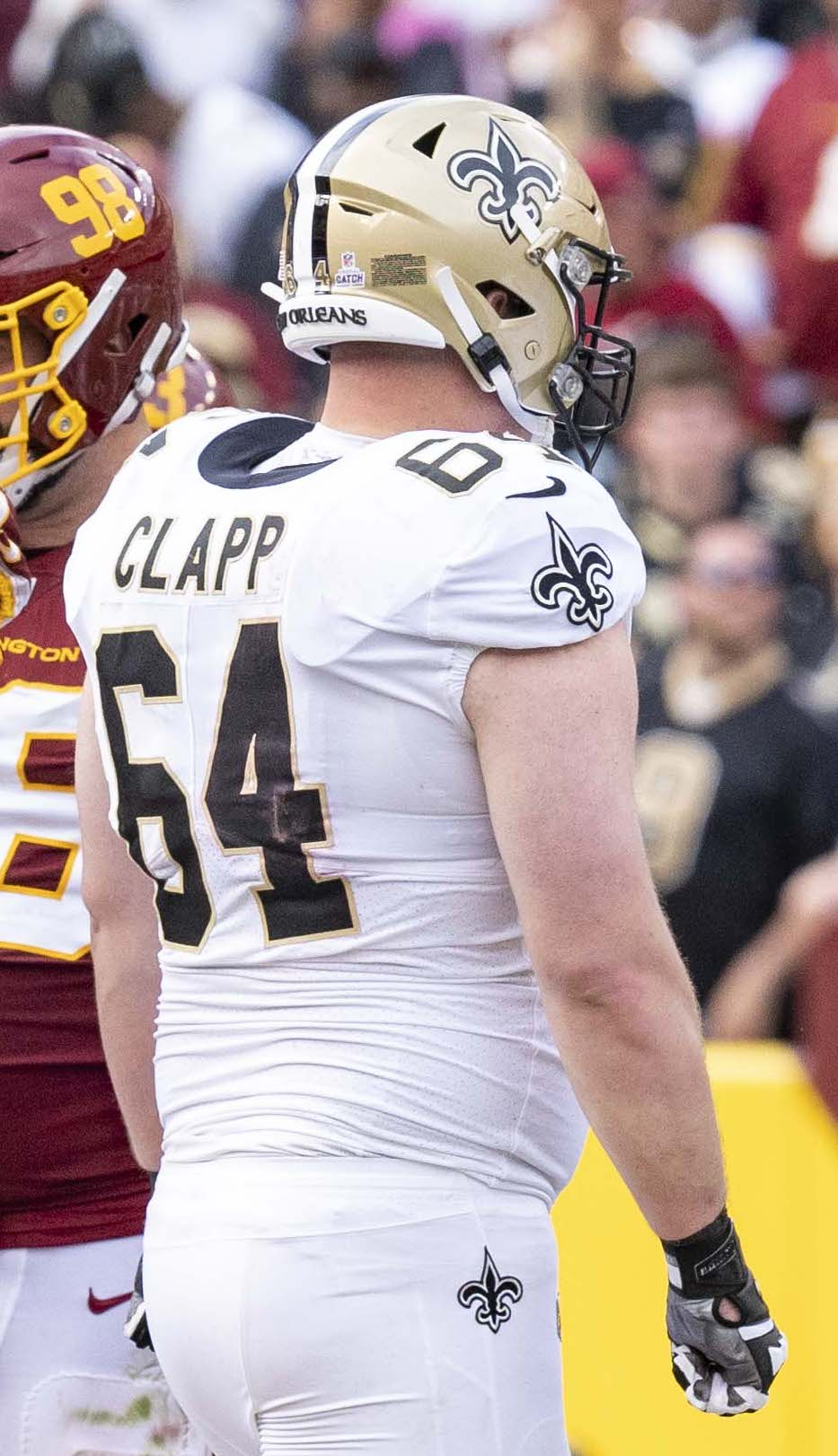
- Clapp with the New Orleans Saints in 2021

New Orleans Saints
- Title: Offensive assistant

Personal information
- Born: December 10, 1995 (age 30); New Orleans, Louisiana, U.S.
- Listed height: 6 ft 5 in (1.96 m)
- Listed weight: 314 lb (142 kg)

Career information
- High school: Brother Martin (New Orleans)
- College: LSU (2014–2017)
- NFL draft: 2018: 7th round, 245th overall pick

Career history

Playing
- New Orleans Saints (2018–2021); Los Angeles Chargers (2022–2023); Buffalo Bills (2024); New Orleans Saints (2025)

Coaching
- New Orleans Saints (2026–present) Offensive assistant

Awards and highlights
- 2× First-team All-SEC (2016, 2017)

Career NFL statistics
- Games played: 66
- Games started: 22
- Stats at Pro Football Reference

Will Clapp (born December 10, 1995) is an American former professional football player who was a center for eight seasons in the National Football League (NFL). He currently serves as an offensive assistant in the NFL for the New Orleans Saints. He was selected by the Saints in the seventh round of the 2018 NFL draft, and played in the NFL for the Saints, Los Angeles Chargers, and Buffalo Bills. He played college football for the LSU Tigers.

== Early life ==
Clapp attended Brother Martin High School in New Orleans, Louisiana. He committed to play football for the LSU Tigers in January 2010.

== College career ==
Clapp did not play as a true freshman in 2014 and chose to redshirt. In 2015, as a redshirt freshman, Clapp started all 12 games for the Tigers. He ranked third on the team in total snaps with 776 and knockdown blocks with 88, along with not allowing a sack all season. He was named to the 2015 Southeastern Conference (SEC) All-Freshman team.

As a redshirt sophomore in 2016, Clapp started 11 of 12 games, missing one due to injury. He played 648 snaps, had 58 knockdown blocks and did not allow a sack for the second straight season. He was named to the 2016 All-SEC football team.

In 2017, Clapp started all 13 games for the Tigers. He was named to the All-SEC Football Team for the second year in a row. After the season, he announced he was going to forgo his final year of eligibility and enter the 2018 NFL draft.

== Professional career ==
Pre-draft measurables
Height	Weight	Arm length	Hand span	Wingspan	40-yard dash	10-yard split	20-yard split	20-yard shuttle	Three-cone drill	Vertical jump	Broad jump	Bench press
6 ft 4 1/2 in (1.94 m)	311 lb (141 kg)	31 1/4 in (0.79 m)	9 5/8 in (0.24 m)	6 ft 4 3/8 in (1.94 m)	5.39 s	1.81 s	3.13 s	4.92 s	8.04 s	29.0 in (0.74 m)	8 ft 1 in (2.46 m)	25 reps
All values from NFL Combine

=== New Orleans Saints (first stint) ===
Clapp was selected by the New Orleans Saints in the seventh round (245th overall) of the 2018 NFL draft. On May 10, 2018, Clapp signed his rookie contract with the Saints. He made his NFL debut on December 17, 2018, against the Carolina Panthers as a substitute for Michael Ola. Clapp saw action in 14 games during the 2019 season, starting three.

On September 26, 2020, Clapp was waived by the Saints and re-signed to the practice squad on September 29. Clapp spent much of the remainder of the 2020 season alternating between the active roster and the practice squad, playing in several games in the middle of the season before being permanently added back to the active roster, though he also spent time on the reserve/COVID-19 list during the postseason.

Clapp re-signed with the Saints on April 20, 2021. After starting the regular season on injured reserve, Clapp was re-activated on October 2, spending the rest of the season alternating between the practice squad and active roster as with the previous year. Clapp started three games in 2021, playing with the likes of Jameis Winston, Trevor Siemian, and Taysom Hill after spending his first three years with Drew Brees under center.

=== Los Angeles Chargers ===
On April 26, 2022, Clapp signed with the Los Angeles Chargers.

On April 6, 2023, Clapp re-signed with the Los Angeles Chargers. Following a season-ending health issue from starter Corey Linsley, Clapp was named the starting center in Week 4. He suffered a knee injury in Week 15 and was placed on injured reserve on December 18.

=== Buffalo Bills ===
On March 22, 2024, Clapp signed a one-year deal with the Buffalo Bills. The move reunited Clapp with Bills offensive coordinator Joe Brady, who was an offensive assistant with New Orleans during Clapp's rookie season. On August 27, 2024, he was waived by the Bills, but later added to their practice squad. He was promoted to the active roster on September 26. He was waived on December 14, and re-signed to the practice squad three days later.

=== New Orleans Saints (second stint) ===
On March 13, 2025, Clapp signed a contract to return to the New Orleans Saints. He suffered a Lisfranc injury in the team's first preseason game and was placed on season-ending injured reserve on August 12.

On February 25, 2026, Clapp retired from professional football.

== Coaching career ==
On March 3, 2026, the New Orleans Saints hired Clapp as an offensive assistant under head coach Kellen Moore.
