= Braxton Hoyett =

American football player (born 1996)

No. 96
- Position: Defensive end

Personal information
- Born: February 5, 1996 (age 30); Alexander City, Alabama, U.S.
- Listed height: 6 ft 2 in (1.88 m)
- Listed weight: 302 lb (137 kg)

Career information
- High school: Pelham Pelham, Alabama)
- College: Mississippi State
- NFL draft: 2019: undrafted

Career history
- Tennessee Titans (2019)*; Kansas City Chiefs (2019–2020); Baltimore Ravens (2020–2021)*; New Orleans Saints (2021)
- * Offseason or practice squad member only

Awards and highlights
- Super Bowl champion (LIV)

Career NFL statistics
- Total tackles: 4
- Stats at Pro Football Reference

Braxton Hoyett (born February 5, 1996) is an American former professional football player who was a defensive end in the National Football League (NFL). He played college football for Mississippi State Bulldogs.

== Professional career ==
=== Tennessee Titans ===
Hoyett was signed by the Tennessee Titans as an undrafted free agent on May 10, 2019. He was waived on August 30, 2019 during final roster cuts.

=== Kansas City Chiefs ===
Hoyett was signed by the Kansas City Chiefs to their practice squad on October 1, 2019. He remained on practice squad for the rest of the season and as the Chiefs won Super Bowl LIV against the San Francisco 49ers.

Hoyett re-signed with the Chiefs on February 5, 2020. He was waived on July 29, 2020, but re-signed on August 8. He was waived during final roster cuts on September 5, 2020, but was signed to the team's practice squad the next day. He was elevated to the active roster on September 19 for the team's Week 2 game against the Los Angeles Chargers, and reverted to the practice squad after the game. He was placed on the practice squad/COVID-19 list by the team on November 10. He was restored to the practice squad and subsequently released on November 17.

=== Baltimore Ravens ===
On December 4, 2020, Hoyett was signed to the Baltimore Ravens' practice squad. He was released on December 15, but re-signed to the practice squad the next day. He was released again on January 12, 2021. On January 18, 2021, Hoyett signed a reserve/futures contract with the Ravens. He was waived with an injury settlement on June 2, 2021.

=== New Orleans Saints ===
On December 22, 2021, Hoyett was signed to the New Orleans Saints' practice squad. He signed a reserve/future contract with the Saints on January 11, 2022. Hoyett was waived by New Orleans on May 11.
