= Bryan Mills (American football) =

American football player (born 1999)

No. 12
- Position: Cornerback

Personal information
- Born: August 3, 1999 (age 27); Palmdale, California, U.S.
- Listed height: 6 ft 1 in (1.85 m)
- Listed weight: 174 lb (79 kg)

Career information
- High school: Quartz Hill (Quartz Hill, California)
- College: North Carolina Central
- NFL draft: 2021: undrafted

Career history
- Seattle Seahawks (2021)*; New Orleans Saints (2021)*; Cleveland Browns (2021)*; Minnesota Vikings (2021); Birmingham Stallions (2022–2023)
- * Offseason or practice squad member only

Awards and highlights
- First-team All-MEAC (2019); 2× USFL champion (2022, 2023)

Bryan Mills (born August 3, 1999) is an American former football cornerback. He played college football at North Carolina Central.

== College career ==
Mills began his college career at Antelope Valley College. He started at cornerback as a freshman and was named All-Southern California Football Association. After receiving no Division I offers, Mills transferred to the College of the Canyons before his sophomore year. After the end of the season, he committed to transfer to North Carolina Central for his remaining collegiate eligibility.

== Professional career ==
Pre-draft measurables
Height	Weight	Arm length	Hand span	40-yard dash	10-yard split	20-yard split	20-yard shuttle	Three-cone drill	Vertical jump	Broad jump	Bench press
6 ft 1 1/8 in (1.86 m)	174 lb (79 kg)	32 in (0.81 m)	8 7/8 in (0.23 m)	4.56 s	1.61 s	2.67 s	4.31 s	7.20 s	37.0 in (0.94 m)	10 ft 4 in (3.15 m)	2 reps
All values from NFL Combine

=== Seattle Seahawks ===
Mills signed with the Seattle Seahawks as an undrafted free agent on May 1, 2021. He was waived during training camp on August 12, 2021.

=== New Orleans Saints ===
Mills was signed by the New Orleans Saints on August 18, 2021, after participating in a tryout for the team. He was waived on August 31, 2021, during final roster cuts.

=== Cleveland Browns ===
Mills was signed by the Cleveland Browns to their practice squad on September 30, 2021. He was released by the Browns on December 28, 2021.

=== Minnesota Vikings ===
Mills was signed to the Minnesota Vikings on January 5, 2022. Mills was elevated to the active roster on January 9, 2022, for the team's Week 18 game against the Chicago Bears and made his NFL debut in the 31–17 victory.

=== Birmingham Stallions ===
Mills was selected with the seventh pick of the 10th round of the 2022 USFL draft by the Birmingham Stallions. He was transferred to the inactive roster on May 14, but moved back to the active roster the next day. He was released on April 10, 2023, and re-signed with the team on May 3. He was released on December 6, 2023, and re-signed on December 26. He was not part of the roster after the 2024 UFL dispersal draft on January 15, 2024.
