= Josiah Bronson =

American football player (born 1997)

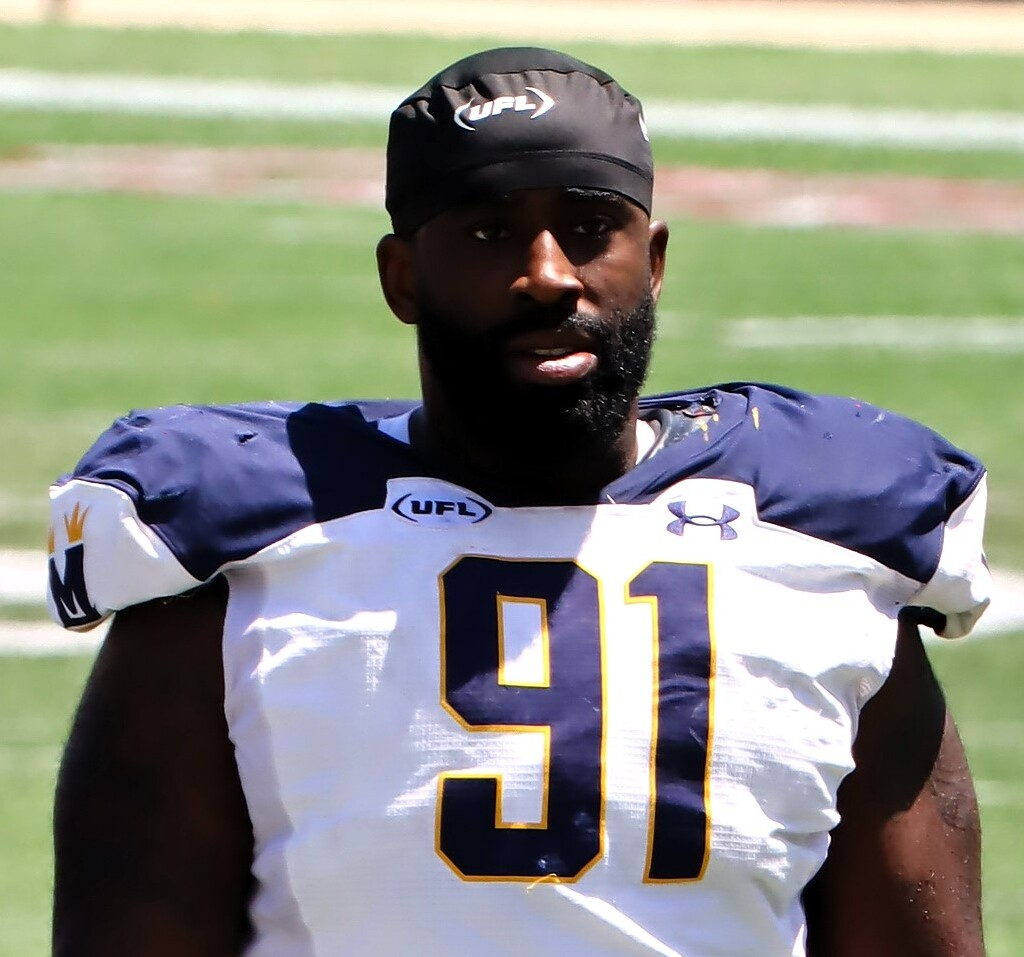
- Bronson with the Memphis Showboats in 2025

No. 91 – Louisville Kings
- Position: Defensive tackle
- Roster status: Active

Personal information
- Born: July 3, 1997 (age 29); Covington, Washington, U.S.
- Listed height: 6 ft 3 in (1.91 m)
- Listed weight: 307 lb (139 kg)

Career information
- High school: Kentwood (Covington, Washington)
- College: Temple (2015–2016); Washington (2017–2020)
- NFL draft: 2021: undrafted

Career history
- New Orleans Saints (2021); Cleveland Browns (2021); Dallas Cowboys (2021)*; Miami Dolphins (2022)*; Memphis Showboats (2024); New England Patriots (2024)*; Indianapolis Colts (2024)*; Memphis Showboats (2025); Tennessee Titans (2025)*; Louisville Kings (2026–present)
- * Offseason or practice squad member only

Awards and highlights
- UFL champion (2026)

Career NFL statistics as of 2024
- Total tackles: 12
- Stats at Pro Football Reference

Josiah Hezekiah Bronson (born July 3, 1997) is an American professional football defensive tackle for the Louisville Kings of the United Football League (UFL). He played college football at Washington and signed with New Orleans Saints as an undrafted free agent in 2021.

== College career ==
Bronson began his college career at Temple and redshirted his true freshman season after breaking his ankle in training camp. He did not play in any games as a redshirt freshman and transferred to Washington at the end of the season following the departure of Temple head coach Matt Rhule.

Bronson joined the Washington Huskies as a walk-on and did not see any playing time in his first season with the team. As a redshirt junior, he played in 12 games and had 11 tackles with one tackle for loss and one sack. Bronson was awarded a scholarship during spring practice after the season. He became a starter during his redshirt senior season and finished the year with 23 tackles, four tackles for loss, and two sacks. Bronson was granted a sixth season of eligibility by the NCAA for the 2020 season.

== Professional career ==
Pre-draft measurables
Height	Weight	Arm length	Hand span	Wingspan	40-yard dash	10-yard split	20-yard split	20-yard shuttle	Three-cone drill	Vertical jump	Broad jump	Bench press
6 ft 2 7/8 in (1.90 m)	304 lb (138 kg)	31 1/2 in (0.80 m)	9 1/4 in (0.23 m)	6 ft 4 1/4 in (1.94 m)	5.07 s	1.77 s	2.98 s	4.72 s	7.63 s	30.0 in (0.76 m)	8 ft 5 in (2.57 m)	27 reps
All values from Pro Day

=== New Orleans Saints ===
Bronson was signed by the New Orleans Saints as an undrafted free agent on May 2, 2021. He was waived during final roster cuts on August 31, but was signed to the team's practice squad the next day. Bronson was elevated to the active roster on October 26, for the team's week 7 game against the Seattle Seahawks and made his NFL debut in the game. He was signed to the Saints' active roster on November 20. Bronson was waived on December 14.

=== Cleveland Browns ===
Bronson was claimed off waivers by Cleveland Browns on December 15, 2021. Bronson was waived by the Browns on December 30.

=== Dallas Cowboys ===
On January 5, 2022, Bronson was signed to the Dallas Cowboys' practice squad. He signed a futures contract with the team on January 19.

On August 30, 2022, Bronson was waived by the Cowboys during final roster cuts.

=== Miami Dolphins ===
On September 5, 2022, Bronson signed with the practice squad of the Miami Dolphins. He signed a reserve/future contract with Miami on January 16, 2023.

On August 28, 2023, Bronson was waived by the Dolphins.

=== Memphis Showboats (first stint) ===
On December 26, 2023, Bronson signed with the Memphis Showboats of the United States Football League (USFL).

=== New England Patriots ===
On July 28, 2024, Bronson signed with the New England Patriots. He was released on August 26.

=== Indianapolis Colts ===
On September 24, 2024, Bronson signed with the Indianapolis Colts practice squad. He was released on October 29.

=== Memphis Showboats (second stint) ===
Bronson re-signed with the Memphis Showboats on January 6, 2025.

=== Tennessee Titans ===
On August 3, 2025, Bronson signed with the Tennessee Titans. He was waived on August 25.

=== Louisville Kings ===
On January 13, 2026, Bronson was selected by the Louisville Kings in the 2026 UFL Draft.
