= Caleb Benenoch =

American football player (born 1994)

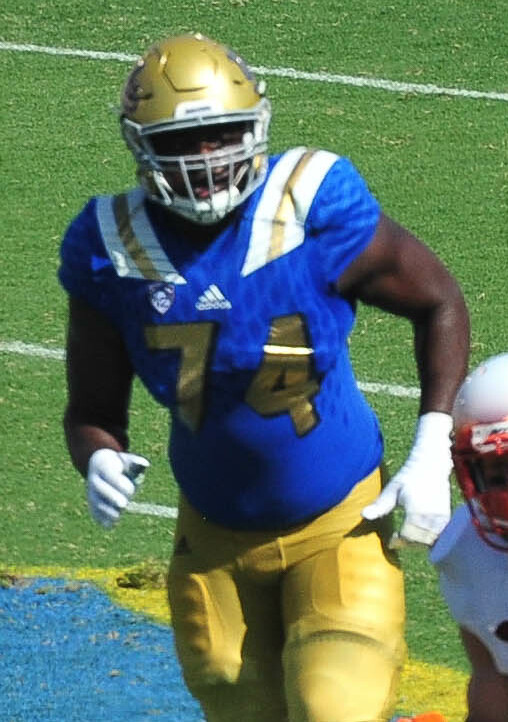
- Benenoch with the UCLA Bruins in 2015

No. 77, 65
- Position: Guard

Personal information
- Born: August 2, 1994 (age 32); Lagos, Nigeria
- Listed height: 6 ft 5 in (1.96 m)
- Listed weight: 305 lb (138 kg)

Career information
- High school: Seven Lakes (Katy, Texas, U.S.)
- College: UCLA (2013–2015)
- NFL draft: 2016: 5th round, 148th overall pick

Career history
- Tampa Bay Buccaneers (2016–2019); New England Patriots (2019); Carolina Panthers (2019); Dallas Cowboys (2019); Detroit Lions (2019); New England Patriots (2020); Buffalo Bills (2021)*; New Orleans Saints (2021); New York Jets (2022)*; Calgary Stampeders (2023)
- * Offseason or practice squad member only

Career NFL statistics
- Games played: 35
- Games started: 22
- Stats at Pro Football Reference

Caleb Orobosa Benenoch (born August 2, 1994) is an American former professional football player who was a guard in the National Football League (NFL) and Canadian Football League (CFL). He played college football for the UCLA Bruins and was selected by the Tampa Bay Buccaneers in the fifth round of the 2016 NFL draft. He was also a member of the New England Patriots, Carolina Panthers, Dallas Cowboys, Detroit Lions, Buffalo Bills, New Orleans Saints, New York Jets, and Calgary Stampeders.

== Early life ==
Benenoch was born in Nigeria and played association football (soccer) in early childhood before migrating to Katy, Texas, at nine. He started to play American football by mistake as his mother signed him up for "football".

== College career ==
Benenoch played college football for the Bruins at the University of California, Los Angeles, from 2013 to 2015.

== Professional career ==
Pre-draft measurables
Height	Weight	Arm length	Hand span	40-yard dash	10-yard split	20-yard split	20-yard shuttle	Three-cone drill	Vertical jump	Broad jump
6 ft 5 1/2 in (1.97 m)	311 lb (141 kg)	34 1/8 in (0.87 m)	10 in (0.25 m)	4.98 s	1.68 s	3.06 s	5.11 s	8.15 s	28.0 in (0.71 m)	8 ft 8 in (2.64 m)
All values from NFL Combine

=== Tampa Bay Buccaneers ===
Benenoch was selected by the Tampa Bay Buccaneers in the fifth round, 148th overall, of the 2016 NFL draft. He played in five games as a rookie, earning his first career start at the right guard position in Week 10 against the Chicago Bears in place of the injured Kevin Pamphile.

In 2018, Benenoch was named the Buccaneers starting right guard, starting all 16 games.

On September 10, 2019, Benenoch was released by the Buccaneers.

=== New England Patriots (first stint) ===
On September 17, 2019, Benenoch signed with the New England Patriots. On October 1, he was released by the Patriots.

=== Carolina Panthers ===
On October 1, 2019, Benenoch was claimed off waivers by the Carolina Panthers. He was released by Carolina on October 22.

=== Dallas Cowboys ===
Benenoch was signed by the Dallas Cowboys on December 1, 2019, following a season-ending injury to Connor Williams. He was released by the Cowboys on December 14.

=== Detroit Lions ===
On December 16, 2019, Benenoch was claimed off waivers by the Detroit Lions. Benenoch was released by the Lions on August 23, 2020.

=== New England Patriots (second stint) ===
On September 12, 2020, Benenoch was signed to the New England Patriots' practice squad. He was elevated to the active roster on October 17 for the team's Week 6 game against the Denver Broncos, and reverted to the practice squad after the game. Benenoch was placed on the practice squad/injured list by the team on November 13. His practice squad contract with the team expired after the season on January 11, 2021.

=== Buffalo Bills ===
On August 4, 2021, Benenoch was signed by the Buffalo Bills. He was waived by Buffalo on August 15.

=== New Orleans Saints ===
On August 18, 2021, Benenoch signed with the New Orleans Saints. He was released by New Orleans on August 31, and was subsequently re-signed to the team's practice squad. Benenoch was promoted to the active roster on December 2.

=== New York Jets ===
On August 8, 2022, Benenoch signed with the New York Jets. On August 23, he was released by the Jets.

=== Calgary Stampeders ===
On April 5, 2023, Benenoch signed with the Calgary Stampeders of the Canadian Football League (CFL). He was released on May 19. On May 21, Benenoch re-signed with the Stampeders. He was again released by Calgary on July 25.
