= Dylan Mabin =

American football player (born 1997)

Profile
- Position: Cornerback

Personal information
- Born: September 14, 1997 (age 29); Akron, Ohio, U.S.
- Listed height: 6 ft 1 in (1.85 m)
- Listed weight: 195 lb (88 kg)

Career information
- High school: Nordonia (Macedonia, Ohio)
- College: Fordham (2015–2018)
- NFL draft: 2019: undrafted

Career history
- Oakland / Las Vegas Raiders (2019–2020); Minnesota Vikings (2020); New Orleans Saints (2021–2022)*; Atlanta Falcons (2022–2023)*; Arizona Cardinals (2023)*
- * Offseason or practice squad member only

Awards and highlights
- 2× First-team All-Patriot League (2017, 2018)

Career NFL statistics
- Total tackles: 2
- Stats at Pro Football Reference

Dylan Mabin (born September 14, 1997) is an American professional football cornerback. He played college football at Fordham.

== College career ==
Mabin was a member of the Fordham Rams for four seasons. In 2017, he was named ‘Rich Marrin’ Team MVP, while also being named to the Patriot League Academic Honor Roll in 2018. Mabin finished his collegiate career with 149 total tackles, 6.5 tackles for loss, two forced fumbles and a fumble recovery with one interception and 40 passes defend in 42 games played and also returned 49 kickoffs for 1,082 yards and one touchdown.

== Professional career ==
Pre-draft measurables
Height	Weight	Arm length	Hand span	40-yard dash	10-yard split	20-yard split	20-yard shuttle	Three-cone drill	Vertical jump	Broad jump	Bench press
6 ft 0 1/4 in (1.84 m)	196 lb (89 kg)	31 3/4 in (0.81 m)	9 1/8 in (0.23 m)	4.41 s	1.51 s	2.50 s	4.46 s	6.98 s	38.0 in (0.97 m)	10 ft 10 in (3.30 m)	14 reps
All values from Pro Day

=== Oakland / Las Vegas Raiders ===
Mabin was signed by the Oakland Raiders as an undrafted free agent on April 29, 2019. He was waived during final roster cuts and was re-signed to the team's practice squad on September 1. Mabin was placed on the practice squad/injured list on December 10.

After the season the renamed Las Vegas Raiders signed Mabin to a reserve/futures contract on January 6, 2020. He was waived at the end of the preseason on September 5, but was re-signed to the practice squad the following day. Mabin was elevated to the Raiders' active roster on October 24 for Week 7 and made his NFL debut the following day in a 45–20 loss to the Tampa Bay Buccaneers. He reverted to the practice squad after the game.

=== Minnesota Vikings ===
On November 6, 2020, Mabin was signed by the Minnesota Vikings off the Raiders practice squad. He was waived by Minnesota on August 22, 2021.

=== New Orleans Saints ===
On September 6, 2021, Mabin was signed to the New Orleans Saints' practice squad. He signed a reserve/future contract with the Saints on January 11, 2022. Mabin was waived/injured by New Orleans on August 8, and was placed on injured reserve the next day. He was waived off injured reserve on August 12.

=== Atlanta Falcons ===
On September 13, 2022, Mabin was signed to the Atlanta Falcons' practice squad. He signed a reserve/future contract with Atlanta on January 9, 2023. Mabin was waived by the Falcons on May 15.

=== Arizona Cardinals ===
On June 5, 2023, Mabin signed with the Arizona Cardinals. He was released by the Cardinals on July 29.

== Post-playing career ==
Following his playing career, Mabin joined the Miami Dolphins as a scout. On June 1, 2026, Mabin was promoted to serve as a college scout.
