= 2020 Atlanta Falcons season =

55th season in franchise history; final one with Dan Quinn

- Owner: Arthur Blank
- General manager: Thomas Dimitroff (fired Oct. 11)
- Head coach: Dan Quinn (fired Oct. 11; 0–5 record); Raheem Morris (interim; 4–7 record)
- Home stadium: Mercedes-Benz Stadium

Results
- Record: 4–12
- Division place: 4th NFC South
- Playoffs: Did not qualify
- All-Pros: WR Calvin Ridley (2nd team)
- Pro Bowlers: DT Grady Jarrett; K Younghoe Koo

Uniform
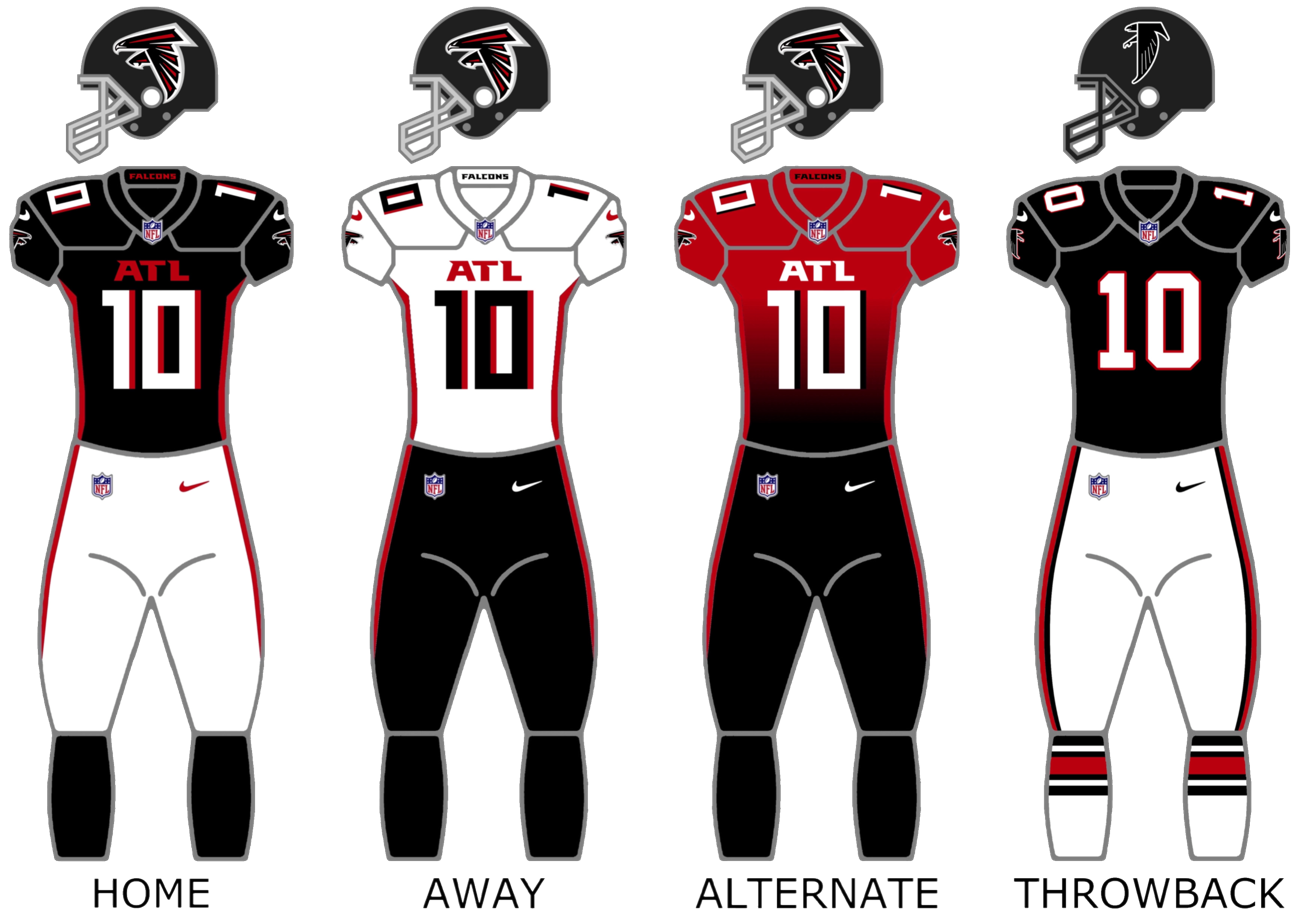

The 2020 season was the Atlanta Falcons' 55th season in the National Football League (NFL), their fourth playing their home games at Mercedes-Benz Stadium, their thirteenth and final season under general manager Thomas Dimitroff and their sixth and final season under head coach Dan Quinn.

For the first time since the 2003 season, the Falcons wore new uniforms, which were unveiled on April 8, 2020.

The Falcons failed to improve on their 7–9 season from the previous year following a Week 14 loss to the Los Angeles Chargers and failed to make the playoffs for the third consecutive season the same week. They suffered their worst record since 2013, and finished last place in the NFC South for the first time since 2007. This was in part of the Falcons beginning the season 0–5, their first 0–5 start since 1997, which included two squandered fourth-quarter leads by more than 15 points in back-to-back weeks. This season was plagued by blown leads and an inability to close out games, with the Falcons squandering six total leads which led to losses and lost eight games with a deficit of 7 or less points. On October 11, following a Week 5 loss to the Carolina Panthers, the Falcons fired head coach Dan Quinn and general manager Thomas Dimitroff. The following day, the Falcons named defensive coordinator Raheem Morris interim head coach. The next day their special teams coordinator Ben Kotwicka was fired. The team failed to beat a single team with a winning record.

== Draft ==
2020 Atlanta Falcons Draft
Round	Selection	Player	Position	College	Notes
1	16	A. J. Terrell	CB	Clemson	
2	47	Marlon Davidson	DT	Auburn	
3	78	Matt Hennessy	C	Temple	
4	119	Mykal Walker	LB	Fresno State	
4	134	Jaylinn Hawkins	S	California	from Baltimore
7	228	Sterling Hofrichter	P	Syracuse	from Philadelphia

Trades

- The Falcons traded wide receiver Mohamed Sanu to the New England Patriots in exchange for a second-round selection.
- The Falcons traded the second-round selection from New England and a fifth-round selection to the Baltimore Ravens in exchange for tight end Hayden Hurst and a fourth-round selection.
- The Falcons traded a sixth-round selection and linebacker Duke Riley to the Philadelphia Eagles in exchange for safety Johnathan Cyprien and a seventh-round selection.

=== Undrafted free agents ===
Player	Position	College
Mikey Daniel	RB	South Dakota State
Jalen McCleskey	WR	Tulane
Juwan Green	WR	Albany
Chris Rowland	WR	Tennessee State
Jared Pinkney	TE	Vanderbilt
Caleb Repp	TE	Utah State
Evin Ksiezarczyk	OL	Buffalo
Hunter Atkinson	T	Georgia State
Austin Capps	OL	Arkansas
Scottie Dill	T	Memphis
Sailosi Latu	DT	San Jose State
Hinwa Allieu	DE	Nebraska-Kearney
Austin Edwards	DE	Ferris State
Bryson Young	LB	Oregon
Rayshawn Wilborn	LB	Ball State
Jordan Williams	LB	Baylor
Rojesterman Farris II	CB	Hawaii
Tyler Hall	CB	Wyoming
Delrick Abrams Jr.	CB	Colorado

== Staff ==
2020 Atlanta Falcons staff
Front office: Owner/chairman – Arthur Blank; President/CEO – Rich McKay; General manager – Thomas Dimitroff (fired Oct. 11); Director of pro personnel – Shepley Heard; Director of football operations – Nick Polk; Director of college scouting – Anthony Robinson; Director of player personnel – Steve Sabo; Vice president of player affairs – Kevin Winston; National scouts – Ruston Webster, Phil Emery, and Joel Collier; Head coaches: Head coach – Dan Quinn; Interim head coach/defensive coordinator – Raheem Morris; Assistant head coach/interim defensive coordinator/linebackers – Jeff Ulbrich; Assistant to the head coach – Steve Scarnecchia; Offensive coaches: Offensive coordinator – Dirk Koetter; Quarterbacks – Greg Knapp; Running backs – Bernie Parmalee; Wide receivers – Dave Brock; Tight ends – Ben Steele; Offensive line – Chris Morgan; Offensive line assistant – Bob Kronenberg; Offensive assistant – Danny Breyer	Defensive coaches: Defensive line – Jess Simpson; Run game coordinator/defensive line – Tosh Lupoi; Outside linebackers – Aden Durde; Pass game coordinator/secondary – Joe Whitt Jr.; Safeties – Chad Walker; Senior defensive assistant – Doug Mallory; Defensive assistant – Lance Schulters; Defensive analyst – Bob Sutton; Special teams coaches: Special teams coordinator – Ben Kotwica; Assistant special teams – Mayur Chaudhari; Game management coordinator – Will Harriger; Strength and conditioning: Head strength and conditioning – Jesse Ackerman; Assistant strength – Brandon Ireland

== Final roster ==
2020 Atlanta Falcons roster
Quarterbacks (QB): 2 Matt Ryan; 8 Matt Schaub; Running backs (RB): 21 Todd Gurley; 23 Brian Hill; 30 Qadree Ollison; 25 Ito Smith; 40 Keith Smith; Wide receivers (WR): 13 Christian Blake; 83 Russell Gage; 19 Devin Gray; 11 Julio Jones; 15 Brandon Powell; 18 Calvin Ridley; 14 Chris Rowland; 80 Laquon Treadwell; Tight ends (TE): 87 Jaeden Graham; 81 Hayden Hurst; 89 Jared Pinkney; 88 Luke Stocker	Offensive linemen (OL): 77 James Carpenter G; 73 Matt Gono T/G; 61 Matt Hennessy C/G; 63 Chris Lindstrom G; 70 Jake Matthews T; 65 Justin McCray G/C; 76 Kaleb McGary T; 75 John Wetzel T; Defensive linemen (DL): 93 Allen Bailey DE/DT; 50 John Cominsky DE; 90 Marlon Davidson DT; 96 Tyeler Davison DT; 56 Dante Fowler DE; 92 Charles Harris DE; 97 Grady Jarrett DT; 55 Steven Means DE; 94 Deadrin Senat DT; 91 Jacob Tuioti-Mariner DT	Linebackers (LB): 45 Deion Jones MLB; 54 Foyesade Oluokun OLB; 59 LaRoy Reynolds MLB; 46 Edmond Robinson OLB; 43 Mykal Walker OLB; Defensive backs (DB): 37 Ricardo Allen FS; 34 Darqueze Dennard CB; 44 Tyler Hall CB; 32 Jaylinn Hawkins SS; 22 Keanu Neal SS; 41 Sharrod Neasman FS; 26 Isaiah Oliver CB; 20 Kendall Sheffield CB; 24 A. J. Terrell CB; 33 Blidi Wreh-Wilson CB; Special teams (ST): 47 Josh Harris LS; 4 Sterling Hofrichter P; 7 Younghoe Koo K	Practice squad: 42 Delrick Abrams CB; 71 Willie Beavers G; 6 Kurt Benkert QB; 36 Tony Brooks-James RB; 16 Greg Dortch WR; 95 Austin Edwards DE (COVID-19); 1 Elliott Fry K; 12 Juwan Green WR; 39 T. J. Green FS; 64 Sean Harlow G/C; 79 Chris Slayton DT; 52 Pita Taumoepenu OLB; 31 Chris Williamson CB; 66 Willie Wright T; Reserve: 27 Damontae Kazee FS (IR); 51 Alex Mack C (COVID-19); 17 Olamide Zaccheaus WR (IR); Rookies in italics 55 active, 3 reserve, 13 practice squad (1 exempt)

== Preseason ==
The Falcons' preseason schedule was announced on May 7, but was later cancelled due to the COVID-19 pandemic.

Week	Date	Opponent	Venue	Result
1	August 14	Miami Dolphins	Mercedes-Benz Stadium	Cancelled due to the COVID-19 pandemic
2	August 21	at Buffalo Bills	New Era Field	Cancelled due to the COVID-19 pandemic
3	August 28	Cincinnati Bengals	Mercedes-Benz Stadium	Cancelled due to the COVID-19 pandemic
4	September 3	at Jacksonville Jaguars	TIAA Bank Field	Cancelled due to the COVID-19 pandemic

== Regular season ==
=== Schedule ===
The Falcons' 2020 schedule was announced on May 7.

Week	Date	Opponent	Result	Record	Venue	Recap
1	September 13	Seattle Seahawks	**L** 25–38	0–1	Mercedes-Benz Stadium	Recap
2	September 20	at Dallas Cowboys	**L** 39–40	0–2	AT&T Stadium	Recap
3	September 27	Chicago Bears	**L** 26–30	0–3	Mercedes-Benz Stadium	Recap
4	October 5	at Green Bay Packers	**L** 16–30	0–4	Lambeau Field	Recap
5	October 11	**Carolina Panthers**	**L** 16–23	0–5	Mercedes-Benz Stadium	Recap
6	October 18	at Minnesota Vikings	**W** 40–23	1–5	U.S. Bank Stadium	Recap
7	October 25	Detroit Lions	**L** 22–23	1–6	Mercedes-Benz Stadium	Recap
8	October 29	at **Carolina Panthers**	**W** 25–17	2–6	Bank of America Stadium	Recap
9	November 8	Denver Broncos	**W** 34–27	3–6	Mercedes-Benz Stadium	Recap
10	Bye					
11	November 22	at **New Orleans Saints**	**L** 9–24	3–7	Mercedes-Benz Superdome	Recap
12	November 29	Las Vegas Raiders	**W** 43–6	4–7	Mercedes-Benz Stadium	Recap
13	December 6	**New Orleans Saints**	**L** 16–21	4–8	Mercedes-Benz Stadium	Recap
14	December 13	at Los Angeles Chargers	**L** 17–20	4–9	SoFi Stadium	Recap
15	December 20	**Tampa Bay Buccaneers**	**L** 27–31	4–10	Mercedes-Benz Stadium	Recap
16	December 27	at Kansas City Chiefs	**L** 14–17	4–11	Arrowhead Stadium	Recap
17	January 3	at **Tampa Bay Buccaneers**	**L** 27–44	4–12	Raymond James Stadium	Recap

Note: Intra-division opponents are in bold text.

=== Game summaries ===
==== Week 1: vs. Seattle Seahawks ====
Week 1: Seattle Seahawks at Atlanta Falcons – Game summary

Quarter	1	2	3	4	Total
**Seahawks**	14	0	14	10	**38**
Falcons	3	9	0	13	**25**

at Mercedes-Benz Stadium, Atlanta, Georgia

- Date: September 13
- Game time: 1:00 p.m. EDT
- Game weather: Mostly cloudy, 80 °F (27 °C) (retractable roof open)
- Game attendance: 0
- Referee: Shawn Hochuli
- TV announcers (Fox): Adam Amin, Mark Schlereth and Lindsay Czarniak
- Recap, Game Book

Game information

**First quarter**

- ATL – Younghoe Koo 49-yard field goal, 11:06. Falcons 3–0. **Drive: 9 plays, 44 yards, 3:54.**
- SEA – Chris Carson 3-yard pass from Russell Wilson (Jason Myers kick), 4:43. Seahawks 7–3. **Drive: 11 plays, 77 yards, 6:23.**
- SEA – Chris Carson 3-yard pass from Russell Wilson (Jason Myers kick), 0:53. Seahawks 14–3. **Drive: 3 plays, 60 yards, 1:17.**

**Second quarter**

- ATL – Todd Gurley 1-yard run (kick failed), 11:25. Seahawks 14–9. **Drive: 9 plays, 75 yards, 4:28.**
- ATL – Younghoe Koo 49-yard field goal, 0:00. Seahawks 14–12. **Drive: 11 plays, 60 yards, 1:37.**

**Third quarter**

- SEA – DK Metcalf 38-yard pass from Russell Wilson (Jason Myers kick), 9:41. Seahawks 21–12. **Drive: 10 plays, 75 yards, 5:19.**
- SEA – Greg Olsen 7-yard pass from Russell Wilson (Jason Myers kick), 5:05. Seahawks 28–12. **Drive: 5 plays, 36 yards, 2:48.**

**Fourth quarter**

- SEA – Jason Myers 42-yard field goal, 11:19. Seahawks 31–12. **Drive: 8 plays, 57 yards, 4:50.**
- ATL – Calvin Ridley 18-yard pass from Matt Ryan (pass failed), 9:35. Seahawks 31–18. **Drive: 5 plays, 75 yards, 1:44.**
- SEA – Carlos Hyde 1-yard run (Jason Myers kick), 3:45. Seahawks 38–18. **Drive: 7 plays, 65 yards, 2:30.**
- ATL – Calvin Ridley 7-yard pass from Matt Ryan (Younghoe Koo kick), 0:33. Seahawks 38–25. **Drive: 12 plays, 75 yards, 3:12.**

**Top passers**

- SEA – Russell Wilson – 31/35, 322 yards, 4 TD
- ATL – Matt Ryan – 37/54, 450 yards, 2 TD, INT

**Top rushers**

- SEA – Russell Wilson – 3 rushes, 29 yards
- ATL – Todd Gurley – 14 rushes, 56 yards, TD

**Top receivers**

- SEA – DK Metcalf – 4 receptions, 95 yards, TD
- ATL – Julio Jones – 9 receptions, 157 yards

With the loss, the Falcons failed to win their opening game for the third straight season and lost their first home opener since 2016.

==== Week 2: at Dallas Cowboys ====
Week 2: Atlanta Falcons at Dallas Cowboys – Game summary

Quarter	1	2	3	4	Total
Falcons	20	9	0	10	**39**
**Cowboys**	0	10	14	16	**40**

at AT&T Stadium, Arlington, Texas

- Date: September 20
- Game time: 1:00 p.m. EDT/12:00 p.m. CDT
- Game weather: Sunny, 73 °F (23 °C) (retractable roof open)
- Game attendance: 21,708
- Referee: Brad Rogers
- TV announcers (Fox): Kevin Burkhardt, Daryl Johnston and Pam Oliver
- Recap, Game Book

Game information

**First quarter**

- ATL – Calvin Ridley 22-yard pass from Matt Ryan (Younghoe Koo kick), 10:58. Falcons 7–0. **Drive: 1 play, 22 yards, 0:08.**
- ATL – Hayden Hurst 42-yard pass from Calvin Ridley (Younghoe Koo kick), 7:37. Falcons 14–0. **Drive: 4 plays, 52 yards, 1:49.**
- ATL – Younghoe Koo 42-yard field goal, 4:26. Falcons 17–0. **Drive: 4 plays, 5 yards, 1:26.**
- ATL – Younghoe Koo 27-yard field goal, 1:06. Falcons 20–0. **Drive: 7 plays, 31 yards, 3:04.**

**Second quarter**

- DAL – Ezekiel Elliott 1-yard run (Greg Zuerlein kick), 12:09. Falcons 20–7. **Drive: 11 plays, 75 yards, 3:57.**
- ATL – Calvin Ridley 3-yard pass from Matt Ryan (pass failed), 5:58. Falcons 26–7. **Drive: 12 plays, 75 yards, 6:11.**
- DAL – Greg Zuerlein 33-yard field goal, 1:46. Falcons 26–10. **Drive: 11 plays, 60 yards, 4:12.**
- ATL – Younghoe Koo 41-yard field goal, 0:02. Falcons 29–10. **Drive: 7 plays, 56 yards, 1:44.**

**Third quarter**

- DAL – Dak Prescott 2-yard run (Greg Zuerlein kick), 12:23. Falcons 29–17. **Drive: 7 plays, 74 yards, 2:37.**
- DAL – Dak Prescott 1-yard run (Greg Zuerlein kick), 4:14. Falcons 29–24. **Drive: 8 plays, 83 yards, 2:47.**

**Fourth quarter**

- ATL – Russell Gage 8-yard pass from Matt Ryan (Younghoe Koo kick), 14:23. Falcons 36–24. **Drive: 11 plays, 74 yards, 4:51.**
- ATL – Younghoe Koo 32-yard field goal, 7:57. Falcons 39–24. **Drive: 10 plays, 30 yards, 4:49.**
- DAL – Dalton Schultz 10-yard pass from Dak Prescott (run failed), 4:57. Falcons 39–30. **Drive: 10 plays, 75 yards, 3:00.**
- DAL – Dak Prescott 1-yard run (Greg Zuerlein), 1:49. Falcons 39–37. **Drive: 9 plays, 76 yards, 1:08.**
- DAL – Greg Zuerlein 46-yard field goal, 0:00. Cowboys 40–39. **Drive: 6 plays, 26 yards, 1:49.**

**Top passers**

- ATL – Matt Ryan – 24/36, 273 yards, 4 TD
- DAL – Dak Prescott – 34/47, 450 yards, TD

**Top rushers**

- ATL – Todd Gurley – 21 rushes, 61 yards, TD
- DAL – Ezekiel Elliott – 22 rushes, 89 yards, TD

**Top receivers**

- ATL – Calvin Ridley – 7 receptions, 109 yards, 2 TD
- DAL – CeeDee Lamb – 6 receptions, 106 yards

The Falcons got off to a 29–10 lead in the first half, but the Cowboys outscored them 30–10 in the second half, including three straight scoring drives in the fourth quarter to win 40–39. In the waning moments of the game, with the Falcons clinging to a 39–37 lead, the Cowboys managed to recover an onside kick despite three Falcons being there to recover it; the Falcons then allowed a game-winning field goal. With this loss, the Atlanta Falcons dropped to 0–2 on the season, their first such start to a season since 2007. The team also dropped to 11–18 all-time against the Cowboys. The Falcons' 39 points scored were the second-most by a losing team all season (only the Browns scored more in a loss, with 42 points against the Ravens in Week 15).

The Falcons recorded three takeaways (all in the first half), but also gave up 572 yards to the Cowboys offense. Atlanta's loss marked the first time a team that scored 39+ points with no giveaways lost a game; teams were previously 440–0 in said situation.

==== Week 3: vs. Chicago Bears ====
Week 3: Chicago Bears at Atlanta Falcons – Game summary

Quarter	1	2	3	4	Total
**Bears**	3	7	0	20	**30**
Falcons	6	10	10	0	**26**

at Mercedes-Benz Stadium, Atlanta, Georgia

- Date: September 27
- Game time: 1:00 p.m. EDT
- Game weather: Partly cloudy, 79 °F (26 °C) (retractable roof open)
- Game attendance: 0
- Referee: Jerome Boger
- TV announcers (Fox): Kenny Albert, Jonathan Vilma and Shannon Spake
- Recap, Game Book

Game information

**First quarter**

- ATL – Hayden Hurst 1-yard pass from Matt Ryan (kick failed), 9:43. Falcons 6–0. **Drive: 3 plays, 64 yards, 1:09.**
- CHI – Cairo Santos 35-yard field goal, 2:43. Falcons 6–3. **Drive: 12 plays, 58 yards, 7:00.**

**Second quarter**

- ATL – Younghoe Koo 29-yard field goal, 8:31. Falcons 9–3. **Drive: 12 plays, 53 yards, 6:18.**
- ATL – Brian Hill 35-yard run (Younghoe Koo kick), 4:37. Falcons 16–3. **Drive: 5 plays, 62 yards, 1:17.**
- CHI – Jimmy Graham 2-yard pass from Mitchell Trubisky (Cairo Santos kick), 1:50. Falcons 16–10. **Drive: 7 plays, 75 yards, 2:47.**

**Third quarter**

- ATL – Todd Gurley 10-yard run (Younghoe Koo kick), 12:34. Falcons 23–10. **Drive: 7 plays, 75 yards, 2:26.**
- ATL – Younghoe Koo 36-yard field goal, 9:58. Falcons 26–10. **Drive: 4 plays, 1 yard, 0:55.**

**Fourth quarter**

- CHI – Jimmy Graham 3-yard pass from Nick Foles (pass failed), 6:20. Falcons 26–16. **Drive: 9 plays, 62 yards, 2:50.**
- CHI – Allen Robinson 37-yard pass from Nick Foles (Cairo Santos kick), 4:21. Falcons 26–23. **Drive: 3 plays, 55 yards, 0:59.**
- CHI – Anthony Miller 37-yard pass from Nick Foles (Cairo Santos kick), 1:53. Bears 30–26. **Drive: 5 plays, 44 yards, 2:06.**

**Top passers**

- CHI – Nick Foles – 16/29, 188 yards, 3 TD, INT
- ATL – Matt Ryan – 19/38, 238 yards, TD, INT

**Top rushers**

- CHI – David Montgomery – 14 rushes, 45 yards
- ATL – Todd Gurley – 14 rushes, 80 yards, TD

**Top receivers**

- CHI – Allen Robinson – 10 receptions, 123 yards, TD
- ATL – Calvin Ridley – 5 receptions, 110 yards

For the second consecutive week, the Falcons blew a 15+ point lead entering the fourth quarter. With yet another defeat, the Atlanta Falcons lost their first three games of the season for the first time since 2007. The Falcons became the first team in NFL history to lose at least two games in the same season after leading by at least 15 points entering the fourth quarter.

==== Week 4: at Green Bay Packers ====
Week 4: Atlanta Falcons at Green Bay Packers – Game summary

Quarter	1	2	3	4	Total
Falcons	0	3	6	7	**16**
**Packers**	7	13	7	3	**30**

at Lambeau Field, Green Bay, Wisconsin

- Date: October 5
- Game time: 9:00 p.m. EDT/8:00 p.m. CDT
- Game weather: Clear, 53 °F (12 °C)
- Game attendance: 0
- Referee: Carl Cheffers
- TV announcers (ESPN): Steve Levy, Brian Griese, Louis Riddick, Lisa Salters and John Parry
- Recap, Game Book

Game information

**First quarter**

- GB – Aaron Jones 6-yard pass from Aaron Rodgers (Mason Crosby kick), 10:01. Packers 7–0. **Drive: 7 plays, 73 yards, 3:32.**

**Second quarter**

- ATL – Elliott Fry 23-yard field goal, 7:38. Packers 7–3. **Drive: 20 plays, 94 yards, 10:36.**
- GB – Robert Tonyan 19-yard pass from Aaron Rodgers (kick failed), 2:28. Packers 13–3. **Drive: 11 plays, 75 yards, 5:10.**
- GB – Robert Tonyan 8-yard pass from Aaron Rodgers (Matt Crosby kick), 0:46. Packers 20–3. **Drive: 7 plays, 50 yards, 0:51.**

**Third quarter**

- ATL – Todd Gurley 5-yard run (kick failed), 7:20. Packers 20–9. **Drive: 8 plays, 67 yards, 4:22.**
- GB – Robert Tonyan 21-yard pass from Aaron Rodgers (Matt Crosby kick), 5:18. Packers 27–9. **Drive: 4 plays, 51 yards, 2:02.**

**Fourth quarter**

- ATL – Todd Gurley 3-yard run (Elliott Fry kick), 12:52. Packers 27–16. **Drive: 13 plays, 75 yards, 7:26.**
- GB – Matt Crosby 48-yard field goal, 5:55. Packers 30–16. **Drive: 10 plays, 45 yards, 6:57.**

**Top passers**

- ATL – Matt Ryan – 28/39, 285 yards
- GB – Aaron Rodgers – 27/33, 327 yards, 4 TD

**Top rushers**

- ATL – Todd Gurley – 16 rushes, 57 yards, 2 TD
- GB – Aaron Jones – 15 rushes, 71 yards

**Top receivers**

- ATL – Olamide Zaccheaus – 8 receptions, 86 yards
- GB – Robert Tonyan – 6 receptions, 98 yards, 3 TD

==== Week 5: vs. Carolina Panthers ====
Week 5: Carolina Panthers at Atlanta Falcons – Game summary

Quarter	1	2	3	4	Total
**Panthers**	3	17	0	3	**23**
Falcons	7	0	3	6	**16**

at Mercedes-Benz Stadium, Atlanta, Georgia

- Date: October 11
- Game time: 1:00 p.m. EDT
- Game weather: None (retractable roof closed)
- Game attendance: 6,656
- Referee: Brad Allen
- TV announcers (Fox): Chris Myers, Brock Huard and Jen Hale
- Recap, Game Book

Game information

**First quarter**

- ATL – Todd Gurley 35-yard run (Younghoe Koo kick), 8:19. Falcons 7–0. **Drive: 10 plays, 92 yards, 4:36.**
- CAR – Joey Slye 38-yard field goal, 0:57. Falcons 7–3. **Drive: 14 plays, 64 yards, 7:22.**

**Second quarter**

- CAR – Joey Slye 39-yard field goal, 9:06. Falcons 7–6. **Drive: 8 plays, 52 yards, 4:53.**
- CAR – D. J. Moore 57-yard pass from Teddy Bridgewater (Joey Slye kick), 2:30. Panthers 13–7. **Drive: 5 plays, 88 yards, 2:23.**
- CAR – Mike Davis 3-yard pass from Teddy Bridgewater (Joey Slye kick), 0:23. Panthers 20–7. **Drive: 9 plays, 89 yards, 1:11.**

**Third quarter**

- ATL – Youngoe Koo 46-yard field goal, 12:19. Panthers 20–10. **Drive: 7 plays, 51 yards, 2:41.**

**Fourth quarter**

- ATL – Youngoe Koo 31-yard field goal, 14:48. Panthers 20–13. **Drive: 15 plays, 67 yards, 5:29.**
- CAR – Joey Slye 22-yard field goal, 1:10. Panthers 23–13. **Drive: 14 plays, 76 yards, 7:39.**
- ATL – Youngoe Koo 54-yard field goal, 0:04. Panthers 23–16. **Drive: 8 plays, 39 yards, 1:06.**

**Top passers**

- CAR – Teddy Bridgewater – 27/37, 313 yards, 2 TD
- ATL – Matt Ryan – 21/37, 226 yards, INT

**Top rushers**

- CAR – Mike Davis – 16 rushes, 89 yards
- ATL – Todd Gurley – 14 rushes, 121 yards, TD

**Top receivers**

- CAR – Robby Anderson – 8 receptions, 112 yards
- ATL – Calvin Ridley – 8 receptions, 136 yards

==== Week 6: at Minnesota Vikings ====
Week 6: Atlanta Falcons at Minnesota Vikings – Game summary

Quarter	1	2	3	4	Total
**Falcons**	10	10	10	10	**40**
Vikings	0	0	7	16	**23**

at U.S. Bank Stadium, Minneapolis, Minnesota

- Date: October 18
- Game time: 1:00 p.m. EDT/12:00 p.m. CDT
- Game weather: None (indoor stadium)
- Game attendance: 0
- Referee: Craig Wrolstad
- TV announcers (Fox): Brandon Gaudin, Daryl Johnston and Pam Oliver
- Recap, Game Book

Game information

**First quarter**

- ATL – Julio Jones 20-yard pass from Matt Ryan (Younghoe Koo kick), 12:02. Falcons 7–0. **Drive: 5 plays, 29 yards, 2:41.**
- ATL – Younghoe Koo 50-yard field goal, 3:02. Falcons 10–0. **Drive: 13 plays, 54 yards, 6:51.**

**Second quarter**

- ATL – Calvin Ridley 8-yard pass from Matt Ryan (Younghoe Koo kick), 1:54. Falcons 17–0. **Drive: 7 plays, 40 yards, 3:52.**
- ATL – Younghoe Koo 21-yard field goal, 0:01. Falcons 20–0. **Drive: 9 plays, 46 yards, 1:05.**

**Third quarter**

- ATL – Younghoe Koo 47-yard field goal, 10:45. Falcons 23–0. **Drive: 10 plays, 56 yards, 4:15.**
- MIN – Justin Jefferson 11-yard pass from Kirk Cousins (Dan Bailey kick), 6:25. Falcons 23–7. **Drive: 9 plays, 75 yards, 4:20.**
- ATL – Julio Jones 40-yard pass from Matt Ryan (Younghoe Koo kick), 2:01. Falcons 30–7. **Drive: 8 plays, 69 yards, 4:24.**

**Fourth quarter**

- ATL – Younghoe Koo 43-yard field goal, 7:07. Falcons 33–7. **Drive: 8 plays, 42 yards, 3:33.**
- MIN – Adam Thielen 2-yard pass from Kirk Cousins (Kirk Cousins-Irv Smith Jr. pass), 3:58. Falcons 33–15. **Drive: 8 plays, 75 yards, 3:09.**
- ATL – Hayden Hurst 35-yard pass from Matt Ryan (Younghoe Koo kick), 2:11. Falcons 40–15. **Drive: 4 plays, 44 yards, 1:47.**
- MIN – Justin Jefferson 49-yard pass from Kirk Cousins (Kirk Cousins-Justin Jefferson pass), 1:26. Falcons 40–23. **Drive: 3 plays, 80 yards, 0:45.**

**Top passers**

- ATL – Matt Ryan – 30/40, 371 yards, 4 TD
- MIN – Kirk Cousins – 24/36, 343 yards, 3 TD, 3 INT

**Top rushers**

- ATL – Todd Gurley – 20 rushes, 47 yards
- MIN – Alexander Mattison – 10 rushes, 26 yards

**Top receivers**

- ATL – Julio Jones – 8 receptions, 137 yards, 2 TD
- MIN – Justin Jefferson – 9 receptions, 166 yards, 2 TD

==== Week 7: vs. Detroit Lions ====
Week 7: Detroit Lions at Atlanta Falcons – Game summary

Quarter	1	2	3	4	Total
**Lions**	7	3	3	10	**23**
Falcons	0	14	0	8	**22**

at Mercedes-Benz Stadium, Atlanta, Georgia

- Date: October 25
- Game time: 1:00 p.m. EDT
- Game weather: Cloudy, 71 °F (22 °C) (retractable roof open)
- Game attendance: 7,796
- Referee: Land Clark
- TV announcers (Fox): Chris Myers, Greg Jennings, Brock Huard and Jen Hale
- Recap, Game Book

Game information

**First quarter**

- DET – D'Andre Swift 3-yard run (Matt Prater kick), 4:16. Lions 7–0. **Drive: 9 plays, 71 yards, 4:39.**

**Second quarter**

- ATL – Todd Gurley 1-yard run (Younghoe Koo kick), 10:55. Tied 7–7. **Drive: 13 plays, 89 yards, 3:10.**
- ATL – Calvin Ridley 4-yard pass from Matt Ryan (Younghoe Koo kick), 0:29. Falcons 14–7. **Drive: 14 plays, 98 yards, 5:48.**
- DET – Matt Prater 50-yard field goal, 0:00. Falcons 14–10. **Drive: 5 plays, 43 yards, 0:29.**

**Third quarter**

- DET – Matt Prater 51-yard field goal, 7:34. Falcons 14–13. **Drive: 11 plays, 53 yards, 7:26.**

**Fourth quarter**

- DET – Matt Prater 49-yard field goal, 3:16. Lions 16–14. **Drive: 4 plays, 1 yard, 2:13.**
- ATL – Todd Gurley 10-yard run (Matt Ryan-Calvin Ridley pass), 1:04. Falcons 22–16. **Drive: 9 plays, 76 yards, 2:12.**
- DET – T. J. Hockenson 11-yard pass from Matthew Stafford (Matt Prater kick), 0:00. Lions 23–22. **Drive: 8 plays, 75 yards, 1:04.**

**Top passers**

- ATL – Matt Ryan – 31/42, 338 yards, TD
- DET – Matthew Stafford – 25/36, 340 yards, TD

**Top rushers**

- ATL – Todd Gurley – 23 rushes, 63 yards, 2 TD
- DET – Adrian Peterson – 11 rushes, 29 yards

**Top receivers**

- ATL – Julio Jones – 8 receptions, 97 yards
- DET – Kenny Golladay – 6 receptions, 114 yards

In the final seconds of the game, Lions quarterback Matthew Stafford would throw a walk-off touchdown pass to tight end T. J. Hockenson to tie the game. The extra point was successfully converted, giving the Lions a 23–22 victory. Previously during the game, Falcons running back Todd Gurley had accidentally scored a touchdown on a play where the Falcons intended to down the ball at the Lions' 1, run out the clock and kick a field goal. With the loss, the Falcons fell to 1–6. The Falcons wore their red to black gradient uniforms for the first time ever in this game.

==== Week 8: at Carolina Panthers ====
Week 8: Atlanta Falcons at Carolina Panthers – Game summary

Quarter	1	2	3	4	Total
**Falcons**	6	10	3	6	**25**
Panthers	7	7	3	0	**17**

at Bank of America Stadium, Charlotte, North Carolina

- Date: October 29
- Game time: 8:20 p.m. EDT
- Game weather: Partly cloudy, 76 °F (24 °C)
- Game attendance: 5,240
- Referee: Shawn Hochuli
- TV announcers (Fox/NFLN/Amazon Prime Video): Joe Buck, Troy Aikman, Erin Andrews and Kristina Pink
- Recap, Game Book

Game information

**First quarter**

- ATL – Younghoe Koo 20-yard field goal, 11:14. Falcons 3–0. **Drive: 7 plays, 72 yards, 3:46.**
- CAR – Curtis Samuel 12-yard run (Joey Slye kick), 0:29. Panthers 7–3. **Drive: 6 plays, 75 yards, 3:00.**
- ATL – Younghoe Koo 37-yard field goal, 2:36. Panthers 7–6. **Drive: 12 plays, 57 yards, 5:38.**

**Second quarter**

- CAR – Curtis Samuel 29-yard pass from Teddy Bridgewater (Joey Slye kick), 12:40. Panthers 14–6. **Drive: 4 plays, 40 yards, 2:07.**
- ATL – Matt Ryan 13-yard run (Younghoe Koo kick), 8:02. Panthers 14–13. **Drive: 10 plays, 75 yards, 4:38.**
- ATL – Younghoe Koo 36-yard field goal, 0:00. Falcons 16–14. **Drive: 10 plays, 47 yards, 3:55.**

**Third quarter**

- ATL – Younghoe Koo 29-yard field goal, 6:22. Falcons 19–14. **Drive: 10 plays, 46 yards, 5:10.**
- CAR – Joey Slye 39-yard field goal, 2:59. Falcons 19–17. **Drive: 11 plays, 48 yards, 3:23.**

**Fourth quarter**

- ATL – Todd Gurley 3-yard run (kick failed), 11:01. Falcons 25–17. **Drive: 11 plays, 75 yards, 6:58.**

**Top passers**

- ATL – Matt Ryan – 21/30, 281 yards, INT
- CAR – Teddy Bridgewater – 15/23, 176 yards, TD, INT

**Top rushers**

- ATL – Brian Hill – 11 rushes, 55 yards
- CAR – Mike Davis – 13 rushes, 66 yards

**Top receivers**

- ATL – Julio Jones – 7 receptions, 137 yards
- CAR – D. J. Moore – 2 receptions, 55 yards

With the win, the Atlanta Falcons got their only win in their division.

==== Week 9: vs. Denver Broncos ====
Week 9: Denver Broncos at Atlanta Falcons – Game summary

Quarter	1	2	3	4	Total
Broncos	0	3	3	21	**27**
**Falcons**	10	10	7	7	**34**

at Mercedes-Benz Stadium, Atlanta, Georgia

- Date: November 8
- Game time: 1:00 p.m. EST
- Game weather: Cloudy, 72 °F (22 °C) (retractable roof open)
- Game attendance: 7,665
- Referee: Jerome Boger
- TV announcers (CBS): Greg Gumbel, Rich Gannon and Jay Feely
- Recap, Game Book

Game information

**First quarter**

- ATL – Younghoe Koo 52-yard field goal, 9:51. Falcons 7–0. **Drive: 10 plays, 41 yards, 5:09.**
- ATL – Olamide Zaccheaus 51-yard pass from Matt Ryan (Younghoe Koo kick), 1:24. Falcons 10–0. **Drive: 11 plays, 85 yards, 5:38.**

**Second quarter**

- DEN – Brandon McManus 43-yard field goal, 12:27. Falcons 10–3. **Drive: 9 plays, 52 yards, 2:57.**
- ATL – Brandon Powell 9-yard pass from Matt Ryan (Younghoe Koo kick), 9:18. Falcons 17–3. **Drive: 9 plays, 75 yards, 4:09.**
- ATL – Younghoe Koo 35-yard field goal, 1:44. Falcons 20–3. **Drive: 12 plays, 67 yards, 5:28.**

**Third quarter**

- DEN – Brandon McManus 41-yard field goal, 11:02. Falcons 20–6. **Drive: 9 plays, 54 yards, 3:58.**
- ATL – Julio Jones 21-yard pass from Matt Ryan (Younghoe Koo kick), 6:20. Falcons 27–6. **Drive: 6 plays, 80 yards, 3:08.**

**Fourth quarter**

- DEN – Jerry Jeudy 20-yard pass from Drew Lock (Brandon McManus kick), 13:15. Falcons 27–13. **Drive: 10 plays, 70 yards, 4:03.**
- ATL – Todd Gurley 4-yard run (Younghoe Koo kick), 9:05. Falcons 34–13. **Drive: 2 plays, 12 yards, 0:31.**
- DEN – Tim Patrick 9-yard pass from Drew Lock (Brandon McManus kick), 3:53. Falcons 34–20. **Drive: 7 plays, 69 yards, 1:45.**
- DEN – Drew Lock 10-yard run (Brandon McManus kick), 1:52. Falcons 34–27. **Drive: 5 plays, 28 yards, 1:30.**

**Top passers**

- DEN – Drew Lock – 25/48, 313 yards, 2 TD, INT
- ATL – Matt Ryan – 25/35, 284 yards, 3 TD, INT

**Top rushers**

- DEN – Drew Lock – 7 rushes, 47 yards, TD
- ATL – Todd Gurley – 19 rushes, 53 yards, TD

**Top receivers**

- DEN – Jerry Jeudy – 7 receptions, 125 yards, TD
- ATL – Olamide Zaccheaus – 4 receptions, 103 yards, TD

The Falcons wore white at home for the first time since 2003 against the Broncos. The Falcons would jump out to a 20–3 at halftime, but the Broncos would attempt a comeback, and outscored Falcons 24–14 in the second half, but the Falcons held on to get the win. With the win, the Falcons advanced to 3–6.

==== Week 11: at New Orleans Saints ====
Week 11: Atlanta Falcons at New Orleans Saints – Game summary

Quarter	1	2	3	4	Total
Falcons	3	6	0	0	**9**
**Saints**	3	7	7	7	**24**

at Mercedes-Benz Superdome, New Orleans, Louisiana

- Date: November 22
- Game time: 1:00 p.m. EST/12:00 p.m. CST
- Game weather: None (indoor stadium)
- Game attendance: 6,000
- Referee: Brad Allen
- TV announcers (Fox): Kevin Burkhardt, Daryl Johnston and Pam Oliver
- Recap, Game Book

Game information

**First quarter**

- ATL – Younghoe Koo 28-yard field goal, 11:21. Falcons 3–0. **Drive: 7 plays, 65 yards, 3:39.**
- NO – Wil Lutz 22-yard field goal, 2:47. Tied 3–3. **Drive: 9 plays, 66 yards, 4:30.**

**Second quarter**

- ATL – Younghoe Koo 51-yard field goal, 13:56. Falcons 6–3. **Drive: 10 plays, 42 yards, 3:51.**
- ATL – Younghoe Koo 52-yard field goal, 4:31. Falcons 9–3. **Drive: 8 plays, 36 yards, 2:54.**
- NO – Alvin Kamara 3-yard run (Wil Lutz kick), 1:46. Saints 10–9. **Drive: 7 plays, 80 yards, 2:45.**

**Third quarter**

- NO – Taysom Hill 2-yard run (Wil Lutz kick), 9:11. Saints 17–9. **Drive: 10 plays, 80 yards, 5:49.**

**Fourth quarter**

- NO – Taysom Hill 10-yard run (Wil Lutz kick), 12:41. Saints 24–9. **Drive: 6 plays, 53 yards, 4:00.**

**Top passers**

- ATL – Matt Ryan – 19/37, 232 yards, 2 INT
- NO – Taysom Hill – 18/23, 233 yards

**Top rushers**

- ATL – Todd Gurley – 8 rushes, 26 yards
- NO – Taysom Hill – 10 rushes, 51 yards, 2 TD

**Top receivers**

- ATL – Calvin Ridley – 5 receptions, 90 yards
- NO – Michael Thomas – 9 receptions, 104 yards

==== Week 12: vs. Las Vegas Raiders ====
Week 12: Las Vegas Raiders at Atlanta Falcons – Game summary

Quarter	1	2	3	4	Total
Raiders	0	3	3	0	**6**
**Falcons**	6	10	14	13	**43**

at Mercedes-Benz Stadium, Atlanta, Georgia

- Date: November 29
- Game time: 1:00 p.m. EST
- Game weather: None (retractable roof closed)
- Game attendance: 9,124
- Referee: Land Clark
- TV announcers (CBS): Kevin Harlan, Trent Green and Melanie Collins
- Recap, Game Book

Game information

**First quarter**

- ATL – Younghoe Koo 38-yard field goal, 8:26. Falcons 3–0. **Drive: 7 plays, 25 yards, 3:01.**
- ATL – Younghoe Koo 39-yard field goal, 7:06. Falcons 6–0. **Drive: 4 plays, 0 yards, 1:08.**

**Second quarter**

- LV – Daniel Carlson 29-yard field goal, 12:59. Falcons 6–3. **Drive: 9 plays, 51 yards, 4:25.**
- ATL – Calvin Ridley 4-yard pass from Matt Ryan (Younghoe Koo kick), 2:17. Falcons 13–3. **Drive: 13 plays, 82 yards, 7:21.**
- ATL – Younghoe Koo 30-yard field goal, 0:02. Falcons 16–3. **Drive: 8 plays, 49 yards, 0:59.**

**Third quarter**

- ATL – Deion Jones 67-yard interception return (Younghoe Koo kick), 11:36. Falcons 23–3.
- LV – Daniel Carlson 24-yard field goal, 6:39. Falcons 23–6. **Drive: 12 plays, 69 yards, 4:57.**
- ATL – Brandon Powell 4-yard pass from Matt Ryan (Younghoe Koo kick), 2:01. Falcons 30–6. **Drive: 11 plays, 88 yards, 4:39.**

**Fourth quarter**

- ATL – Younghoe Koo 29-yard field goal, 13:34. Falcons 33–6. **Drive: 6 plays, 16 yards, 3:07.**
- ATL – Ito Smith 8-yard run (Younghoe Koo kick), 10:48. Falcons 40–6. **Drive: 4 plays, 35 yards, 1:25.**
- ATL – Younghoe Koo 54-yard field goal, 4:57. Falcons 43–6. **Drive: 7 plays, 33 yards, 4:27.**

**Top passers**

- LV – Derek Carr – 22/34, 215 yards, INT
- ATL – Matt Ryan – 22/39, 185 yards, 2 TD, INT

**Top rushers**

- LV – Josh Jacobs – 7 rushes, 27 yards
- ATL – Ito Smith – 12 rushes, 65 yards, TD

**Top receivers**

- LV – Hunter Renfrow – 7 receptions, 73 yards
- ATL – Calvin Ridley – 6 receptions, 50 yards, TD

==== Week 13: vs. New Orleans Saints ====
Week 13: New Orleans Saints at Atlanta Falcons – Game summary

Quarter	1	2	3	4	Total
**Saints**	7	7	7	0	**21**
Falcons	3	6	0	7	**16**

at Mercedes-Benz Stadium, Atlanta, Georgia

- Date: December 6
- Game time: 1:00 p.m. EST
- Game weather: None (retractable roof closed)
- Game attendance: 8,713
- Referee: Adrian Hill
- TV announcers (Fox): Kenny Albert, Jonathan Vilma and Shannon Spake
- Recap, Game Book

Game information

**First quarter**

- NO – Tre'Quan Smith 15-yard pass from Taysom Hill (Wil Lutz kick), 7:01. Saints 7–0. **Drive: 7 plays, 87 yards, 3:33.**
- ATL – Younghoe Koo 53-yard field goal, 3:55. Saints 7–3. **Drive: 7 plays, 40 yards, 3:06.**

**Second quarter**

- ATL – Younghoe Koo 30-yard field goal, 4:51. Saints 7–6. **Drive: 8 plays, 52 yards, 2:49.**
- NO – Jared Cook 11-yard pass from Taysom Hill (Wil Lutz kick), 1:45. Saints 14–6. **Drive: 7 plays, 75 yards, 3:06.**
- ATL – Younghoe Koo 28-yard field goal, 0:00. Saints 14–9. **Drive: 9 plays, 65 yards, 1:45.**

**Third quarter**

- NO – Alvin Kamara 11-yard run (Wil Lutz kick), 9:01. Saints 21–9. **Drive: 12 plays, 75 yards, 5:59.**

**Fourth quarter**

- ATL – Russell Gage 10-yard pass from Matt Ryan (Younghoe Koo kick), 7:43. Saints 21–16. **Drive: 8 plays, 85 yards, 3:26.**

**Top passers**

- NO – Taysom Hill – 27/37, 232 yards, 2 TD
- ATL – Matt Ryan – 19/39, 273 yards, TD

**Top rushers**

- NO – Alvin Kamara – 15 rushes, 88 yards, TD
- ATL – Ito Smith – 8 rushes, 36 yards

**Top receivers**

- NO – Michael Thomas – 9 receptions, 105 yards
- ATL – Calvin Ridley – 5 receptions, 108 yards

==== Week 14: at Los Angeles Chargers ====
Week 14: Atlanta Falcons at Los Angeles Chargers – Game summary

Quarter	1	2	3	4	Total
Falcons	7	10	0	0	**17**
**Chargers**	7	3	7	3	**20**

at SoFi Stadium, Inglewood, California

- Date: December 13
- Game time: 4:25 p.m. EST/1:25 p.m. PST
- Game weather: None (indoor stadium)
- Game attendance: 0
- Referee: Tony Corrente
- TV announcers (Fox): Joe Davis, Brock Huard, Jenny Taft
- Recap, Game Book

Game information

**First quarter**

- LAC – Keenan Allen 10-yard pass from Justin Herbert (Michael Badgley kick), 3:57. Chargers 7–0. **Drive: 15 plays, 83 yards, 9:33**
- ATL – Calvin Ridley 39-yard pass from Russell Gage (Younghoe Koo kick), 0:21. Tied 7–7. **Drive: 7 plays, 75 yards, 3:36**

**Second quarter**

- ATL – Younghoe Koo 45-yard field goal, 9:47. Falcons 10–7. **Drive: 8 plays, 40 yards, 3:46**
- LAC – Michael Badgley 35-yard field goal, 8:13. Tied 10–10. **Drive: 4 plays, 6 yards 1:34**
- ATL – Laquon Treadwell 9-yard pass from Matt Ryan (Younghoe Koo kick), 4:51. Falcons 17–10. **Drive: 8 plays, 75 yards, 3:22**

**Third quarter**

- LAC – Tyron Johnson 12-yard pass from Justin Herbert (Michael Badgley kick), 1:10. Tied 17–17. **Drive: 13 plays, 85 yards, 8:21**

**Fourth quarter**

- LAC – Michael Badgley 43-yard field goal, 0:00. Chargers 20–17. **Drive: 6 plays, 49 yards, 0:30**

**Top passers**

- ATL – Matt Ryan – 21/31, 224 yards, TD, 3 INT
- LAC – Justin Herbert – 33/40, 195 yards, 2 TD, INT

**Top rushers**

- ATL – Ito Smith – 11 rushes, 42 yards
- LAC – Austin Ekeler – 12 rushes, 63 yards

**Top receivers**

- ATL – Calvin Ridley – 8 receptions, 124 yards, TD
- LAC – Austin Ekeler – 9 receptions, 67 yards

With the loss to a game-winning field goal, the Falcons were eliminated from playoff contention for the third straight season and failed to achieve a winning season.

The Falcons recorded their first road loss against the Chargers, snapping a six-game road winning streak against them.

==== Week 15: vs. Tampa Bay Buccaneers ====
Week 15: Tampa Bay Buccaneers at Atlanta Falcons – Game summary

Quarter	1	2	3	4	Total
**Buccaneers**	0	0	21	10	**31**
Falcons	7	10	7	3	**27**

at Mercedes-Benz Stadium, Atlanta, Georgia

- Date: December 20
- Game time: 1:00 p.m. EST
- Game weather: None (retractable roof closed)
- Game attendance: 10,703
- Referee: Brad Rogers
- TV announcers (Fox): Kevin Burkhardt, Daryl Johnston and Pam Oliver
- Recap, Game Book

Game information

**First quarter**

- ATL – Russell Gage 5-yard pass from Matt Ryan (Younghoe Koo kick), 10:34. Falcons 7–0. **Drive: 8 plays, 75 yards, 4:26.**

**Second quarter**

- ATL – Calvin Ridley 12-yard pass from Matt Ryan (Younghoe Koo kick), 7:48. Falcons 14–0. **Drive: 10 plays, 65 yards, 5:10.**
- ATL – Younghoe Koo 32-yard field goal, 0:15. Falcons 17–0. **Drive: 13 plays, 75 yards, 3:29.**

**Third quarter**

- TB – Leonard Fournette 1-yard run (Ryan Succop kick), 11:28. Falcons 17–7. **Drive: 7 plays, 80 yards, 3:32.**
- ATL – Hayden Hurst 7-yard pass from Matt Ryan (Younghoe Koo kick), 7:34. Falcons 24–7. **Drive: 7 plays, 75 yards, 3:54.**
- TB – Chris Godwin 4-yard pass from Tom Brady (Ryan Succop kick), 3:44. Falcons 24–14. **Drive: 8 plays, 75 yards, 3:50.**
- TB – Leonard Fournette 1-yard run (Ryan Succop kick), 0:05. Falcons 24–21. **Drive: 7 plays, 76 yards, 2:48.**

**Fourth quarter**

- TB – Ryan Succop 27-yard field goal, 11:10. Tied 24–24. **Drive: 9 plays, 42 yards, 3:15.**
- ATL – Younghoe Koo 52-yard field goal, 8:22. Falcons 27–24. **Drive: 6 plays, 41 yards, 2:48.**
- TB – Antonio Brown 46-yard pass from Tom Brady (Ryan Succop kick), 6:19. Buccaneers 31–27. **Drive: 4 plays, 78 yards, 2:03.**

**Top passers**

- TB – Tom Brady – 31/45, 390 yards, 2 TD
- ATL – Matt Ryan – 34/49, 356 yards, 3 TD

**Top rushers**

- TB – Leonard Fournette – 14 rushes, 49 yards, 2 TD
- ATL – Ito Smith – 6 rushes, 24 yards

**Top receivers**

- TB – Mike Evans – 6 receptions, 110 yards
- ATL – Calvin Ridley – 10 receptions, 163 yards, TD

The Falcons jumped out to a 17–0 lead by halftime, but, in a turn of events similar to Super Bowl LI, Atlanta allowed Tom Brady and the Buccaneers to outscore the Falcons 31–10 in the second half en route to a Tampa Bay victory.

==== Week 16: at Kansas City Chiefs ====
Week 16: Atlanta Falcons at Kansas City Chiefs – Game summary

Quarter	1	2	3	4	Total
Falcons	0	7	0	7	**14**
**Chiefs**	0	7	0	10	**17**

at Arrowhead Stadium, Kansas City, Missouri

- Date: December 27
- Game time: 1:00 p.m. EST/12:00 p.m. CST
- Game weather: 49 °F (9 °C)
- Game attendance: 13,470
- Referee: Craig Wrolstad
- TV announcers (Fox): Kevin Burkhardt, Daryl Johnston and Pam Oliver
- Recap, Game Book

Game information

**First quarter**

- No scoring plays.

**Second quarter**

- ATL – Hayden Hurst 5-yard pass from Matt Ryan (Younghoe Koo kick), 3:35. Falcons 7–0. **Drive: 9 plays, 98 yards, 5:09.**
- KC – Travis Kelce 4-yard pass from Patrick Mahomes (Harrison Butker kick), 0:30. Tied 7–7. **Drive: 12 plays, 78 yards, 3:05.**

**Third quarter**

- No scoring plays.

**Fourth quarter**

- KC – Harrison Butker 53-yard field goal, 14:08. Chiefs 10–7. **Drive: 7 plays, 28 yards, 2:31.**
- ATL – Laquon Treadwell 5-yard pass from Matt Ryan (Younghoe Koo kick), 4:33. Falcons 14–10. **Drive: 8 plays, 75 yards, 3:25.**
- KC – Demarcus Robinson 25-yard pass from Patrick Mahomes (Harrison Butker kick), 1:55. Chiefs 17–14. **Drive: 9 plays, 75 yards, 2:38.**

**Top passers**

- ATL – Matt Ryan – 27/35, 300 yards, 2 TD
- KC – Patrick Mahomes – 24/44, 278 yards, 2 TD, INT

**Top rushers**

- ATL – Ito Smith – 10 rushes, 46 yards
- KC – Darrel Williams – 10 rushes, 46 yards

**Top receivers**

- ATL – Calvin Ridley – 5 receptions, 130 yards
- KC – Travis Kelce – 7 receptions, 98 yards, TD

Late in the game, the Falcons were in position to tie the game against the defending Super Bowl champions, but Younghoe Koo missed a 39-yard field goal which was partially deflected. With this loss, the Falcons fell to 4-11.

==== Week 17: at Tampa Bay Buccaneers ====
Week 17: Atlanta Falcons at Tampa Bay Buccaneers – Game summary

Quarter	1	2	3	4	Total
Falcons	3	7	10	7	**27**
**Buccaneers**	10	13	0	21	**44**

at Raymond James Stadium, Tampa, Florida

- Date: January 3, 2021
- Game time: 1:00 p.m. EST
- Game weather: Cloudy, 65 °F (18 °C)
- Game attendance: 16,009
- Referee: Alex Kemp
- TV announcers (Fox): Chris Myers, Greg Jennings and Jen Hale
- Recap, Game Book

Game information

**First quarter**

- TB – Chris Godwin 29-yard pass from Tom Brady (Ryan Succop kick), 11:06. Buccaneers 7–0. **Drive: 7 plays, 68 yards, 3:54.**
- ATL – Younghoe Koo 22-yard field goal, 3:33. Buccaneers 7–3. **Drive: 13 plays, 70 yards, 7:33.**
- TB – Ryan Succop 29-yard field goal, 0:07. Buccaneers 10–3. **Drive: 9 plays, 62 yards, 3:26.**

**Second quarter**

- TB – Antonio Brown 25-yard pass from Tom Brady (Ryan Succop kick), 12:30. Buccaneers 17–3. **Drive: 6 plays, 57 yards, 2:14.**
- TB – Ryan Succop 38-yard field goal, 8:44. Buccaneers 20–3. **Drive: 6 plays, 19 yards, 2:27.**
- ATL – Matt Ryan 1-yard run (Younghoe Koo kick), 1:56. Buccaneers 20–10. **Drive: 14 plays, 75 yards, 6:48.**
- TB – Ryan Succop 25-yard field goal, 0:00. Buccaneers 23–10. **Drive: 9 plays, 68 yards, 1:56.**

**Third quarter**

- ATL – Russell Gage 19-yard pass from Matt Ryan (Younghoe Koo kick), 8:49. Buccaneers 23–17. **Drive: 11 plays, 75 yards, 6:11.**
- ATL – Younghoe Koo 21-yard field goal, 0:30. Buccaneers 23–20. **Drive: 15 plays, 79 yards, 6:43.**

**Fourth quarter**

- TB – Ronald Jones II 3-yard run (Ryan Succop kick), 11:13. Buccaneers 30–20. **Drive: 9 plays, 75 yards, 4:17.**
- ATL – Hayden Hurst 1-yard pass from Matt Ryan (Younghoe Koo kick), 8:19. Buccaneers 30–27. **Drive: 6 plays, 75 yards, 2:54.**
- TB – Chris Godwin 4-yard pass from Tom Brady (Ryan Succop kick), 3:54. Buccaneers 37–27. **Drive: 8 plays, 75 yards, 4:25.**
- TB – Antonio Brown 30-yard pass from Tom Brady (Ryan Succop kick), 2:52. Buccaneers 44–27. **Drive: 3 plays, 38 yards, 0:19.**

**Top passers**

- ATL – Matt Ryan – 29/44, 265 yards, 2 TD
- TB – Tom Brady – 26/41, 399 yards, 4 TD, INT

**Top rushers**

- ATL – Brian Hill – 9 rushes, 94 yards
- TB – Ronald Jones II – 12 rushes, 78 yards, TD

**Top receivers**

- ATL – Russell Gage – 9 receptions, 91 yards, TD
- TB – Antonio Brown – 11 receptions, 138 yards, 2 TD

With the loss, the Falcons finished last place in the NFC South for the first time since 2007.

=== Standings ===
==== Division ====
NFC South
	W	L	T	PCT	DIV	CONF	PF	PA	STK
^{(2)} New Orleans Saints	12	4	0	.750	6–0	10–2	482	337	W2
^{(5)} Tampa Bay Buccaneers	11	5	0	.688	4–2	8–4	492	355	W4
Carolina Panthers	5	11	0	.313	1–5	4–8	350	402	L1
Atlanta Falcons	4	12	0	.250	1–5	2–10	396	414	L5

==== Conference ====
NFC
#	Team	Division	W	L	T	PCT	DIV	CONF	SOS	SOV	STK
**Division leaders**
1	Green Bay Packers	North	13	3	0	.813	5–1	10–2	.428	.387	W6
2 (Note: New Orleans finished ahead of Seattle based on conference record.)	New Orleans Saints	South	12	4	0	.750	6–0	10–2	.459	.406	W2
3	Seattle Seahawks	West	12	4	0	.750	4–2	9–3	.447	.404	W4
4	Washington Football Team	East	7	9	0	.438	4–2	5–7	.459	.388	W1
**Wild cards**
5	Tampa Bay Buccaneers	South	11	5	0	.688	4–2	8–4	.488	.392	W4
6	Los Angeles Rams	West	10	6	0	.625	3–3	9–3	.494	.484	W1
7 (Note: Chicago finished and clinched the 7th and final playoff spot ahead of Arizona based on better win percentage in common games (against Detroit, the NY Giants, Carolina, and the LA Rams, Chicago finished 3–2, while Arizona finished 1–4).)	Chicago Bears	North	8	8	0	.500	2–4	6–6	.488	.336	L1
**Did not qualify for the postseason**
8	Arizona Cardinals	West	8	8	0	.500	2–4	6–6	.475	.441	L2
9	Minnesota Vikings	North	7	9	0	.438	4–2	5–7	.504	.366	W1
10 (Note: San Francisco finished ahead of the NY Giants based on head-to-head victory. Division tie break was initially used to eliminate Dallas (see below).)	San Francisco 49ers	West	6	10	0	.375	3–3	4–8	.549	.448	L1
11 (Note: NY Giants won tiebreaker over Dallas based on division record.)	New York Giants	East	6	10	0	.375	4–2	5–7	.502	.427	W1
12	Dallas Cowboys	East	6	10	0	.375	2–4	5–7	.471	.333	L1
13 (Note: Carolina finished ahead of Detroit based on head-to-head victory.)	Carolina Panthers	South	5	11	0	.313	1–5	4–8	.531	.388	L1
14	Detroit Lions	North	5	11	0	.313	1–5	4–8	.508	.350	L4
15	Philadelphia Eagles	East	4	11	1	.281	2–4	4–8	.537	.469	L3
16	Atlanta Falcons	South	4	12	0	.250	1–5	2–10	.551	.391	L5
**Tiebreakers** (Note: When breaking ties for three or more teams under the NFL's rules, they are first broken within divisions, then comparing only the highest-ranked remaining team from each division.)
