= 2020 Carolina Panthers season =

26th season in franchise history

- Owner: David Tepper
- General manager: Marty Hurney (fired Dec. 21)
- Head coach: Matt Rhule
- Home stadium: Bank of America Stadium

Results
- Record: 5–11
- Division place: 3rd NFC South
- Playoffs: Did not qualify
- Pro Bowlers: None

Uniform
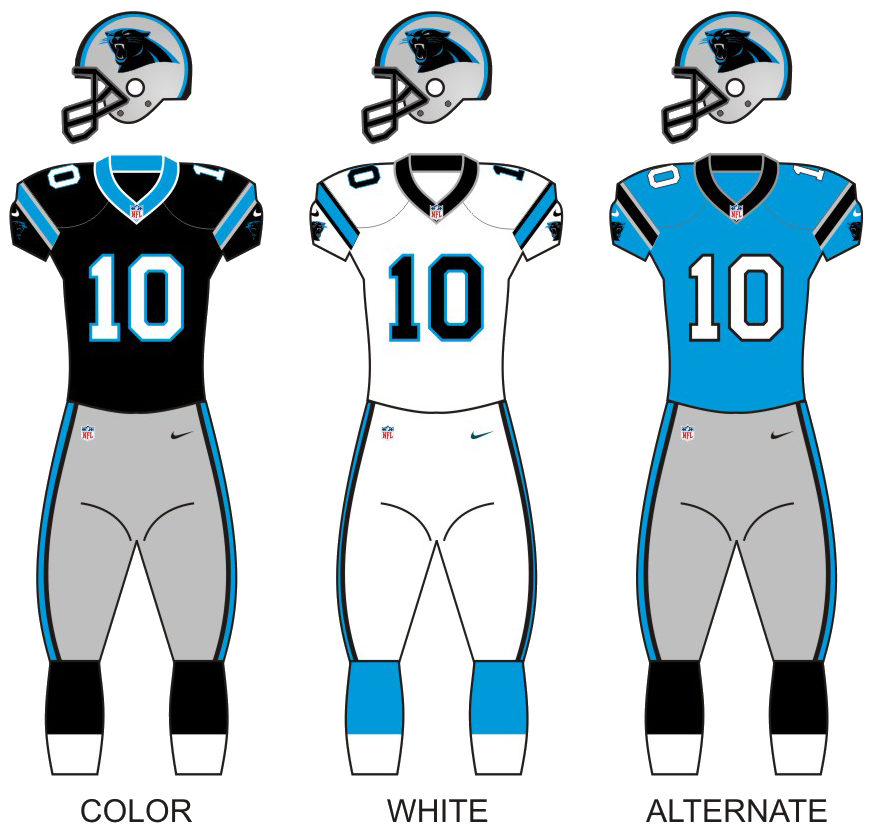

The 2020 season was the Carolina Panthers' 26th in the National Football League (NFL) and their first under head coach Matt Rhule. The offseason saw several notable departures; quarterback Cam Newton was released after the Panthers could not find a team willing to trade for him, while linebacker Luke Kuechly announced his retirement on January 14, 2020. On December 21, 2020 the Panthers parted ways with general manager Marty Hurney after a total of 14 non-consecutive seasons with the organization.

With a loss to the Vikings in week 12, the Panthers secured their third consecutive non-winning season. After losing their first two games and winning the next three, the Panthers suffered a five-game losing streak before beating the Lions in week 11 and losing to the Vikings before their bye week. After their week 15 loss to the Packers, Carolina was eliminated from the playoffs for the third consecutive season. With the loss to the Saints in week 17, the Panthers matched their 5–11 record from the previous season.

== Draft ==
2020 Carolina Panthers Draft
Round	Selection	Player	Position	College	Notes
1	7	Derrick Brown	DT	Auburn	
2	38	Yetur Gross-Matos	DE	Penn State	
2	64	Jeremy Chinn	S	Southern Illinois	from Seattle
4	113	Troy Pride	CB	Notre Dame	
5	152	Kenny Robinson	S	West Virginia	from Washington
6	184	Bravvion Roy	DT	Baylor	
7	221	Stantley Thomas-Oliver	CB	Florida International	

Draft trades

- Carolina traded their third- and fifth- round selections (69th and 148th) to Seattle in exchange for their second round selection (64th)
- Carolina traded quarterback Kyle Allen to Washington for their fifth-round selection (152nd overall)

2020 Carolina Panthers undrafted free agents
Name	Position	College	Ref.
Myles Adams	DE	Rice	
Omar Bayless	WR	Arkansas State	
Branden Bowen	OT	Ohio State	
Jason Ferris	LB	Montana Western	
Sam Franklin	LB	Temple	
Myles Hartsfield	S	Ole Miss	
TreVontae Hights	WR	TCU	
Mike Horton	G	Auburn	
Jordan Mack	LB	Virginia	
Frederick Mauigoa	C	Washington State	
Chris Orr	LB	Wisconsin	
David Reese	LB	Florida	
Giovanni Ricci	TE	Western Michigan	
Austrian Robinson	DT	Ole Miss	
Rodney Smith	RB	Minnesota	
Cam Sutton	TE	Fresno State	
Sam Tecklenburg	C	Baylor	

== Staff ==
2020 Carolina Panthers staff
Front office: Owner – David Tepper; Executive director of player personnel – Jeff Morrow; Executive director of football staff – Mark Carrier; Vice president of football operations – Sean Padden; Director of football operations – Bryan Porter; Director of player personnel – Pat Stewart; Director of pro personnel – Matt Allen; Director of football analytics – Taylor Rajack; Head coaches: Head coach – Matt Rhule; Offensive coaches: Offensive coordinator – Joe Brady; Quarterbacks – Jake Peetz; Assistant quarterbacks – Matt Lombardi; Senior offensive assistant/running backs – Jeff Nixon; Wide receivers – Frisman Jackson; Tight ends – Brian Angelichio; Offensive line – Pat Meyer; Assistant offensive line – Marcus Satterfield	Defensive coaches: Defensive coordinator – Phil Snow; Defensive line – Mike Phair; Assistant defensive line – Frank Okam; Defensive run game coordinator – Al Holcomb; Linebackers – Mike Siravo; Defensive pass game coordinator/secondary – Jason Simmons; Cornerbacks – Evan Cooper; Special teams coaches: Special teams coordinator – Chase Blackburn; Assistant special teams – Ed Foley; Coaching assistants: Assistant to the Head Coach – Matthew Delgado; Coaching Assistant – EJ Barthel; Coaching Assistant – DJ Mangas; Coaching Assistant – Grant Udinski; Coaching Assistant – Cedric Whitaker; Strength and conditioning: Head athletic trainer – Kevin King; Strength and conditioning – Jeremy Scott; Assistant strength and conditioning – Gus Felder and Thomas Barbeau

== Final roster ==
2020 Carolina Panthers roster
Quarterbacks (QB): 5 Teddy Bridgewater; 7 Will Grier; 15 Tommy Stevens; 6 P. J. Walker; Running backs (RB): 40 Alex Armah; 36 Trenton Cannon; 28 Mike Davis; 22 Christian McCaffrey; 35 Rodney Smith; Wide receivers (WR): 11 Robby Anderson; 14 Pharoh Cooper; 12 D. J. Moore; 10 Curtis Samuel; 16 Brandon Zylstra; Tight ends (TE): 82 Chris Manhertz; 80 Ian Thomas; 86 Colin Thompson	Offensive linemen (OL): 63 Matt Kaskey T; 69 Tyler Larsen C; 67 John Miller G; 72 Taylor Moton T; 76 Russell Okung T; 61 Matt Paradis C; 64 Chris Reed G; 75 Michael Schofield G/T; Defensive linemen (DL): 95 Derrick Brown DT; 53 Brian Burns DE; 97 Yetur Gross-Matos DE; 78 Woodrow Hamilton DT; 92 Zach Kerr DT; 96 Austin Larkin DE; 94 Efe Obada DE; 93 Bravvion Roy DT	Linebackers (LB): 56 Jermaine Carter MLB; 21 Jeremy Chinn OLB; 98 Marquis Haynes OLB; 50 Julian Stanford OLB; 57 Adarius Taylor OLB; 54 Shaq Thompson OLB; 52 Tahir Whitehead MLB; Defensive backs (DB): 33 Tre Boston FS; 31 Juston Burris SS; 24 Rasul Douglas CB; 29 Corn Elder CB; 42 Sam Franklin Jr. SS; 38 Myles Hartsfield FS; 26 Donte Jackson CB; 30 Natrell Jamerson SS; 27 Kenny Robinson SS; 23 Stantley Thomas-Oliver III CB; Special teams (ST): 3 Joseph Charlton P; 44 J. J. Jansen LS; 4 Joey Slye K	Practice squad: 48 Daniel Bituli OLB; 83 Ventell Bryant WR; 34 Sean Chandler SS; 82 Amara Darboh WR; 77 Bruce Hector DT; 66 Mike Horton G; 13 Ishmael Hyman WR (PS/I); 47 Clay Johnston MLB; 19 Marken Michel WR; 62 Aaron Monteiro T; 45 Chris Orr MLB; 79 Mike Panasiuk DT; 85 Giovanni Ricci TE; 71 Sam Tecklenburg C/G; 46 Jonathan Wynn DE; Reserve: 17 Omar Bayless WR (IR); 39 Reggie Bonnafon RB (IR); 65 Dennis Daley T/G (IR); 18 Keith Kirkwood WR (IR); 74 Greg Little T (IR); -- Jordan Mack OLB (Opt-out); 55 Christian Miller OLB (Opt-out); 2 Michael Palardy P (NF-Inj.); 25 Troy Pride CB (IR); 68 Trent Scott T (IR); 99 Kawann Short DT (IR); 91 Stephen Weatherly DE (IR); Rookies in italics 53 active, 12 reserve, 14 practice squad (1 exempt)

== Preseason ==
The Panthers' preseason schedule was announced on May 7, but was later cancelled due to the COVID-19 pandemic.

Week	Date	Opponent	Venue	Result
1	August 13	Jacksonville Jaguars	Bank of America Stadium	Cancelled due to the COVID-19 pandemic
2	August 20	at New England Patriots	Gillette Stadium	Cancelled due to the COVID-19 pandemic
3	August 30	at Baltimore Ravens	M&T Bank Stadium	Cancelled due to the COVID-19 pandemic
4	September 3	Pittsburgh Steelers	Bank of America Stadium	Cancelled due to the COVID-19 pandemic

== Regular season ==
=== Schedule ===
The Panthers' 2020 schedule was announced on May 7.

Week	Date	Opponent	Result	Record	Venue	Recap
1	September 13	Las Vegas Raiders	**L** 30–34	0–1	Bank of America Stadium	Recap
2	September 20	at **Tampa Bay Buccaneers**	**L** 17–31	0–2	Raymond James Stadium	Recap
3	September 27	at Los Angeles Chargers	**W** 21–16	1–2	SoFi Stadium	Recap
4	October 4	Arizona Cardinals	**W** 31–21	2–2	Bank of America Stadium	Recap
5	October 11	at **Atlanta Falcons**	**W** 23–16	3–2	Mercedes-Benz Stadium	Recap
6	October 18	Chicago Bears	**L** 16–23	3–3	Bank of America Stadium	Recap
7	October 25	at **New Orleans Saints**	**L** 24–27	3–4	Mercedes-Benz Superdome	Recap
8	October 29	**Atlanta Falcons**	**L** 17–25	3–5	Bank of America Stadium	Recap
9	November 8	at Kansas City Chiefs	**L** 31–33	3–6	Arrowhead Stadium	Recap
10	November 15	**Tampa Bay Buccaneers**	**L** 23–46	3–7	Bank of America Stadium	Recap
11	November 22	Detroit Lions	**W** 20–0	4–7	Bank of America Stadium	Recap
12	November 29	at Minnesota Vikings	**L** 27–28	4–8	U.S. Bank Stadium	Recap
13	Bye					
14	December 13	Denver Broncos	**L** 27–32	4–9	Bank of America Stadium	Recap
15	December 19	at Green Bay Packers	**L** 16–24	4–10	Lambeau Field	Recap
16	December 27	at Washington Football Team	**W** 20–13	5–10	FedExField	Recap
17	January 3	**New Orleans Saints**	**L** 7–33	5–11	Bank of America Stadium	Recap

Note: Intra-division opponents are in bold text.

=== Game summaries ===
==== Week 1: vs. Las Vegas Raiders ====
Week One: Las Vegas Raiders at Carolina Panthers – Game summary

Quarter	1	2	3	4	Total
**Raiders**	7	10	10	7	**34**
Panthers	9	6	0	15	**30**

at Bank of America Stadium, Charlotte, North Carolina

- Date: September 13
- Game time: 1:00 p.m. EDT
- Game weather: Mostly sunny, 81 °F (27 °C)
- Game attendance: 0
- Referee: Brad Allen
- TV announcers (CBS): Greg Gumbel, Rich Gannon and Jay Feely
- Recap, Game Book

Game information

**First quarter**

- CAR – Joey Slye 47-yard field goal, 10:07. Panthers 3–0. **Drive: 6 plays, 34 yards, 4:02.**
- LV – Josh Jacobs 1-yard run (Daniel Carlson kick), 5:47. Raiders 7–3. **Drive: 8 plays, 75 yards, 4:15.**
- CAR – Christian McCaffrey 6-yard run (kick failed), 0:59. Panthers 9–7. **Drive: 10 plays, 63 yards, 4:50.**

**Second quarter**

- LV – Daniel Carlson 20-yard field goal, 8:16. Raiders 10–9. **Drive: 15 plays, 73 yards, 7:44.**
- CAR – Joey Slye, 46-yard field goal, 5:08. Panthers 12–10. **Drive: 7 plays, 47 yards, 3:10.**
- LV – Nelson Agholor 23-yard pass from Derek Carr (Daniel Carlson kick), 1:54. Raiders 17–12. **Drive: 8 plays, 75 yards, 3:09.**
- CAR – Joey Slye 31-yard field goal, 0:02. Raiders 17–15. **Drive: 11 plays, 62 yards, 1:52.**

**Third quarter**

- LV – Daniel Carlson 54-yard field goal, 9:43. Raiders 20–15. **Drive: 6 plays, 15 yards, 3:04.**
- LV – Josh Jacobs 7-yard run (Daniel Carlson kick), 5:29. Raiders 27–15. **Drive: 6 plays, 49 yards, 3:35.**

**Fourth quarter**

- CAR – Christian McCaffrey 3-yard run (Joey Slye kick), 12:32. Raiders 27–22. **Drive: 5 plays, 11 yards, 3:05.**
- CAR – Robby Anderson 75-yard pass from Teddy Bridgewater (Teddy Bridgewater–Robby Anderson pass), 8:29. Panthers 30–27. **Drive: 2 plays, 77 yards, 0:58.**
- LV – Josh Jacobs 6-yard run (Daniel Carlson kick), 4:08. Raiders 34–30. **Drive: 9 plays, 75 yards, 4:21.**

**Top passers**

- LV – Derek Carr – 22/30, 239 yards, TD
- CAR – Teddy Bridgewater – 22/34, 270 yards, TD

**Top rushers**

- LV – Josh Jacobs – 25 rushes, 93 yards, 3 TD
- CAR – Christian McCaffrey – 23 rushes, 96 yards, 2 TD

**Top receivers**

- LV – Henry Ruggs – 3 receptions, 55 yards
- CAR – Robby Anderson – 6 receptions, 115 yards, TD

In the Panthers' home opener, they came close to beating the Las Vegas Raiders until a Raiders touchdown at the end of the fourth quarter. The Panthers, facing a 4th and 1 near midfield, gave the ball to FB Alexander Armah who was stuffed at the line of scrimmage, resulting in a turnover on downs; they were criticized for not giving the ball to McCaffrey. The Panthers lost 30–34 and started off the season 0–1.

==== Week 2: at Tampa Bay Buccaneers ====
Week Two: Carolina Panthers at Tampa Bay Buccaneers – Game summary

Quarter	1	2	3	4	Total
Panthers	0	0	7	10	**17**
**Buccaneers**	14	7	0	10	**31**

at Raymond James Stadium, Tampa, Florida

- Date: September 20
- Game time: 1:00 p.m. EDT
- Game weather: Cloudy, 85 °F (29 °C)
- Game attendance: 0
- Referee: John Hussey
- TV announcers (Fox): Adam Amin, Mark Schlereth and Lindsay Czarniak
- Recap, Game Book

Game information

**First quarter**

- TB – Ronald Jones 7-yard run (Ryan Succop kick), 5:42. Buccaneers 7–0. **Drive: 10 plays, 78 yards, 4:17.**
- TB – Mike Evans 23-yard pass from Tom Brady (Ryan Succop kick), 5:42. Buccaneers 14–0. **Drive: 1 play, 23 yards, 0:07.**

**Second quarter**

- TB – Leonard Fournette 1-yard run (Ryan Succop kick), 3:01. Buccaneers 21–0. **Drive: 7 plays, 65 yards, 3:02.**

**Third quarter**

- CAR – Christian McCaffrey 1-yard run (Joey Slye kick), 3:01. Buccaneers 21–7. **Drive: 8 plays, 47 yards, 5:25.**

**Fourth quarter**

- CAR – Christian McCaffrey 7-yard run (Joey Slye kick), 13:25. Buccaneers 21–14. **Drive: 13 plays, 93 yards, 6:19.**
- TB – Ryan Succop 33-yard field goal, 6:13. Buccaneers 24–14. **Drive: 8 plays, 45 yards, 3:57.**
- CAR – Joey Slye 23-yard field goal, 1:57. Buccaneers 24–17. **Drive: 10 plays, 70 yards, 4:16.**
- TB – Leonard Fournette 46-yard run (Ryan Succop kick), 1:48. Buccaneers 31–17. **Drive: 1 play, 46 yards, 0:09.**

**Top passers**

- CAR – Teddy Bridgewater – 33/42, 367 yards, 2 INT
- TB – Tom Brady – 23/35, 217 yards, TD, INT

**Top rushers**

- CAR – Christian McCaffrey – 18 rushes, 59 yards, 2 TD
- TB – Leonard Fournette – 12 rushes, 103 yards, 2 TD

**Top receivers**

- CAR – D. J. Moore – 8 receptions, 120 yards
- TB – Mike Evans – 7 receptions, 104 yards, TD

Carolina traveled down south to Tampa Bay to face their new quarterback, Tom Brady. It was a scoreless first half for the Panthers while Tampa Bay managed to score 21 points. In the third Christian McCaffrey put points up on the board for Carolina. He again scored another touchdown early in the fourth decreasing the lead to seven. Soon after he left the game with a sprained ankle. Tampa Bay and Carolina then both scored field goals. Leonard Fournette ran up the field 46 yards for a Bucs touchdown. The Buccaneers defeat the Panthers 31–17. With this loss, the Panthers suffered their second consecutive 0–2 start.

==== Week 3: at Los Angeles Chargers ====
Week Three: Carolina Panthers at Los Angeles Chargers – Game summary

Quarter	1	2	3	4	Total
**Panthers**	6	12	0	3	**21**
Chargers	0	7	3	6	**16**

at SoFi Stadium, Inglewood, California

- Date: September 27
- Game time: 4:05 p.m. EDT/1:05 p.m. PDT
- Game weather: Hazy, 77 °F (25 °C)
- Game attendance: 0
- Referee: Tony Corrente
- TV announcers (CBS): Greg Gumbel, Rich Gannon and Jay Feely
- Recap, Game Book

Game information

**First quarter**

- CAR – Joey Slye 29-yard field goal, 9:20. Panthers 3–0. **Drive: 6 plays, 37 yards, 3:07.**
- CAR – Joey Slye 24-yard field goal, 4:28. Panthers 6–0. **Drive: 7 plays, 29 yards, 3:15.**

**Second quarter**

- LAC – Austin Ekeler 12-yard run (Michael Badgley kick), 14:14. Chargers 7–6. **Drive: 10 plays, 75 yards, 5:14.**
- CAR – Joey Slye 30-yard field goal, 8:11. Panthers 9–7. **Drive: 10 plays, 59 yards, 6:03.**
- CAR – Mike Davis 13-yard pass from Teddy Bridgewater (kick blocked), 8:11. Panthers 15–7. **Drive: 8 plays, 57 yards, 3:57.**
- CAR – Joey Slye 22-yard field goal, 0:00. Panthers 18–7. **Drive: 2 plays, 4 yards, 0:08.**

**Third quarter**

- CAR – Michael Badgley 41-yard field goal, 1:12. Panthers 18–10. **Drive: 10 plays, 37 yards, 4:34.**

**Fourth quarter**

- CAR – Joey Slye 31-yard field goal, 10:58. Panthers 21–10. **Drive: 8 plays, 62 yards, 5:14.**
- LAC – Keenan Allen 14-yard pass from Justin Herbert (pass failed), 4:33. Panthers 21–16. **Drive: 16 plays, 75 yards, 6:25.**

**Top passers**

- CAR – Teddy Bridgewater – 22/28, 235 yards, TD
- LAC – Justin Herbert – 35/49, 330 yards, TD, INT

**Top rushers**

- CAR – Mike Davis – 13 rushes, 46 yards
- LAC – Austin Ekeler – 12 rushes, 59 yards, TD

**Top receivers**

- CAR – Jason Moore – 2 receptions, 65 yards
- LAC – Keenan Allen – 13 receptions, 132 yards, TD

The Panthers were able to hold off the Chargers and defeat them 21–16, improving to 1–2. With this win they snapped a 10-game losing streak dating back to week 9 of last season.

==== Week 4: vs. Arizona Cardinals ====
Week Four: Arizona Cardinals at Carolina Panthers – Game summary

Quarter	1	2	3	4	Total
Cardinals	0	7	7	7	**21**
**Panthers**	14	7	7	3	**31**

at Bank of America Stadium, Charlotte, North Carolina

- Date: October 4
- Game time: 1:00 p.m. EDT
- Game weather: Mostly sunny, 68 °F (20 °C)
- Game attendance: 5,120
- Referee: Ronald Torbert
- TV announcers (Fox): Kevin Kugler, Chris Spielman and Laura Okmin
- Recap, Game Book

Game information

**First quarter**

- CAR – Mike Davis 1-yard run (Joey Slye kick), 7:21. Panthers 7–0. **Drive: 13 plays, 66 yards, 5:44.**
- CAR – Teddy Bridgewater 18-yard run (Joey Slye kick), 1:29. Panthers 14–0. **Drive: 9 plays, 80 yards, 4:31.**

**Second quarter**

- ARI – Jordan Thomas 3-yard pass from Kyler Murray (Zane Gonzalez kick), 7:26. Panthers 14–7. **Drive: 10 plays, 38 yards, 5:31.**
- CAR – Reggie Bonnafon 3-yard pass from Teddy Bridgewater (Joey Slye kick), 1:55. Panthers 21–7. **Drive: 10 plays, 75 yards, 5:31.**

**Third quarter**

- CAR – Ian Thomas 2-yard pass from Teddy Bridgewater (Joey Slye kick), 5:26. Panthers 28–7. **Drive: 8 plays, 74 yards, 4:19.**
- ARI – Christian Kirk 3-yard pass from Kyler Murray (Zane Gonzalez kick), 1:15. Panthers 28–14. **Drive: 7 plays, 75 yards, 4:11.**

**Fourth quarter**

- CAR – Joey Slye 27-yard field goal, 7:45. Panthers 31–14. **Drive: 15 plays, 73 yards, 8:30.**
- ARI – Chase Edmonds 2-yard pass from Kyler Murray (Zane Gonzalez kick), 2:13. Panthers 31–21. **Drive: 7 plays, 68 yards, 1:52.**

**Top passers**

- ARI – Kyler Murray – 24/31, 133 yards, 3 TD
- CAR – Teddy Bridgewater – 26/37, 276 yards, 2 TD, INT

**Top rushers**

- ARI – Kyler Murray – 6 rushes, 78 yards
- CAR – Mike Davis – 16 rushes, 84 yards, TD

**Top receivers**

- ARI – DeAndre Hopkins – 7 receptions, 41 yards
- CAR – Robby Anderson – 8 receptions, 99 yards

The Panthers started the game off with scoring two touchdowns by Mike Davis and Teddy Bridgewater in the first quarter. In the second Arizona's Patrick Peterson intercepted a pass intended for Ian Thomas. Kyler Murray threw a three-yard pass to Jordan Thomas resulting in a Cardinals touchdown. Kyler Murray fumbles the ball in the third quarter and it was recovered by Carolina. The Panthers score with another Ian Thomas touchdown. Arizona answers back with a touchdown. Joey Slye kicks a field goal for Carolina, and Chase Edmonds scores a touchdown for Arizona in the fourth. Panthers win 31–21 and improve to 2–2.

Ahead of this matchup, the Panthers announced that they would be deploying robotic technology to disinfect areas around their stadium and locker room as an effort to keep fans and players safe from COVID-19.

==== Week 5: at Atlanta Falcons ====
Week Five: Carolina Panthers at Atlanta Falcons – Game summary

Quarter	1	2	3	4	Total
**Panthers**	3	17	0	3	**23**
Falcons	7	0	3	6	**16**

at Mercedes-Benz Stadium, Atlanta, Georgia

- Date: October 11
- Game time: 1:00 p.m. EDT
- Game weather: None (retractable roof closed)
- Game attendance: 6,656
- Referee: Brad Allen
- TV announcers (Fox): Chris Myers, Brock Huard and Jen Hale
- Recap, Game Book

Game information

**First quarter**

- ATL – Todd Gurley 35-yard run (Younghoe Koo kick), 8:19. Falcons 7–0. **Drive: 10 plays, 92 yards, 4:36.**
- CAR – Joey Slye 38-yard field goal, 0:57. Falcons 7–3. **Drive: 14 plays, 64 yards, 7:22.**

**Second quarter**

- CAR – Joey Slye 39-yard field goal, 9:06. Falcons 7–6. **Drive: 8 plays, 52 yards, 4:53.**
- CAR – D. J. Moore 57-yard pass from Teddy Bridgewater (Joey Slye kick), 2:30. Panthers 13–7. **Drive: 5 plays, 88 yards, 2:23.**
- CAR – Mike Davis 3-yard pass from Teddy Bridgewater (Joey Slye kick), 0:23. Panthers 20–7. **Drive: 9 plays, 89 yards, 1:11.**

**Third quarter**

- ATL – Youngoe Koo 46-yard field goal, 12:19. Panthers 20–10. **Drive: 7 plays, 51 yards, 2:41.**

**Fourth quarter**

- ATL – Youngoe Koo 31-yard field goal, 14:48. Panthers 20–13. **Drive: 15 plays, 67 yards, 5:29.**
- CAR – Joey Slye 22-yard field goal, 1:10. Panthers 23–13. **Drive: 14 plays, 76 yards, 7:39.**
- ATL – Youngoe Koo 54-yard field goal, 0:04. Panthers 23–16. **Drive: 8 plays, 39 yards, 1:06.**

**Top passers**

- CAR – Teddy Bridgewater – 27/37, 313 yards, 2 TD
- ATL – Matt Ryan – 21/37, 226 yards, INT

**Top rushers**

- CAR – Mike Davis – 16 rushes, 89 yards
- ATL – Todd Gurley – 14 rushes, 121 yards, TD

**Top receivers**

- CAR – Robby Anderson – 8 receptions, 112 yards
- ATL – Calvin Ridley – 8 receptions, 136 yards

The Panthers defeat the Falcons 23–16, and improve to 3–2. This was also the team's first win in Atlanta since 2014.

==== Week 6: vs. Chicago Bears ====
Week Six: Chicago Bears at Carolina Panthers – Game summary

Quarter	1	2	3	4	Total
**Bears**	7	6	7	3	**23**
Panthers	3	3	0	10	**16**

at Bank of America Stadium, Charlotte, North Carolina

- Date: October 18
- Game time: 1:00 p.m. EDT
- Game weather: Sunny, 63 °F (17 °C)
- Game attendance: 5,240
- Referee: Adrian Hill
- TV announcers (Fox): Kenny Albert, Jonathan Vilma and Shannon Spake
- Recap, Game Book

Game information

**First quarter**

- CHI – Cole Kmet 9-yard pass from Nick Foles (Cairo Santos kick), 11:40. Bears 7–0. **Drive: 3 plays, 7 yards, 1:36.**
- CAR – Joey Slye 21-yard field goal, 5:07. Bears 7–3. **Drive: 14 plays, 72 yards, 6:33.**

**Second quarter**

- CHI – Cairo Santos 31-yard field goal, 8:09. Bears 10–3. **Drive: 11 plays, 48 yards, 5:58.**
- CAR – Joey Slye 20-yard field goal, 2:00. Bears 10–6. **Drive: 13 plays, 73 yards, 6:09.**
- CHI – Cairo Santos 55-yard field goal, 0:02. Bears 13–6. **Drive: 9 plays, 38 yards, 1:58.**

**Third quarter**

- CHI – Nick Foles 1-yard run (Cairo Santos kick), 1:44. Bears 20–6. **Drive: 10 plays, 56 yards, 4:29.**

**Fourth quarter**

- CAR – Mike Davis 1-yard run (Joey Slye kick), 13:11. Bears 20–13. **Drive: 9 plays, 75 yards, 3:33.**
- CHI – Cairo Santos 31-yard field goal, 9:19. Bears 23–13. **Drive: 10 plays, 62 yards, 3:52.**
- CAR – Joey Slye 48-yard field goal, 7:46. Bears 23–16. **Drive: 5 plays, 35 yards, 1:33.**

**Top passers**

- CHI – Nick Foles – 23/39, 198 yards, TD, INT
- CAR – Teddy Bridgewater – 16/29, 216 yards, 2 INT

**Top rushers**

- CHI – David Montgomery – 19 rushes, 58 yards
- CAR – Mike Davis – 18 rushes, 52 yards, TD

**Top receivers**

- CHI – Allen Robinson – 5 receptions, 53 yards
- CAR – D. J. Moore – 5 receptions, 93 yards

Chicago beats Carolina 23–16, and the Panthers fall to 3–3.

==== Week 7: at New Orleans Saints ====
Week Seven: Carolina Panthers at New Orleans Saints – Game summary

Quarter	1	2	3	4	Total
Panthers	3	14	7	0	**24**
**Saints**	7	14	3	3	**27**

at Mercedes-Benz Superdome, New Orleans, Louisiana

- Date: October 25
- Game time: 1:00 p.m. EDT/12:00 p.m. CDT
- Game weather: None (indoor stadium)
- Game attendance: 3,000
- Referee: Craig Wrolstad
- TV announcers (Fox): Kevin Kugler, Chris Spielman and Laura Okmin
- Recap, Game Book

Game information

**First quarter**

- NO – Jared Cook 4-yard pass from Drew Brees (Wil Lutz kick), 6:34. Saints 7–0. **Drive: 14 plays, 75 yards, 8:26.**
- CAR – Joey Slye 43-yard field goal, 1:54. Saints 7–3. **Drive: 9 plays, 50 yards, 4:40.**

**Second quarter**

- NO – Drew Brees 1-yard run (Wil Lutz kick), 12:13. Saints 14–3. **Drive: 9 plays, 78 yards, 4:41.**
- CAR – D. J. Moore 74-yard pass from Teddy Bridgewater (Joey Slye kick), 10:56. Saints 14–10. **Drive: 2 plays, 75 yards, 1:17.**
- CAR – D. J. Moore 7-yard pass from Teddy Bridgewater (Joey Slye kick), 1:37. Panthers 17–14. **Drive: 9 plays, 65 yards, 5:21.**
- NO – Deonte Harris 4-yard pass from Drew Brees (Wil Lutz kick), 0:02. Saints 21–17. **Drive: 8 plays, 75 yards, 1:35.**

**Third quarter**

- NO – Wil Lutz 41-yard field goal, 4:24. Saints 24–17. **Drive: 13 plays, 58 yards, 6:53.**
- CAR – Curtis Samuel 5-yard run (Joey Slye kick), 0:08. Tied 24–24. **Drive: 8 plays, 75 yards, 4:16.**

**Fourth quarter**

- NO – Wil Lutz 43-yard field goal, 7:55. Saints 27–24. **Drive: 13 plays, 50 yards, 7:13.**

**Top passers**

- CAR – Teddy Bridgewater – 23/28, 254 yards, 2 TD
- NO – Drew Brees – 29/36, 287 yards, 2 TD

**Top rushers**

- CAR – Mike Davis – 7 rushes, 12 yards
- NO – Alvin Kamara – 14 rushes, 83 yards

**Top receivers**

- CAR – D. J. Moore – 4 receptions, 93 yards, 2 TD
- NO – Marquez Callaway – 8 receptions, 75 yards

It was another close one for the Panthers but they ended up losing to Saints 24–27 after Joey Slye missed a tying field goal, and fall to 3–4. This was quarterback Teddy Bridgewater's first return to New Orleans since leaving the team via free agency during the offseason.

==== Week 8: vs. Atlanta Falcons ====
Week Eight: Atlanta Falcons at Carolina Panthers – Game summary

Quarter	1	2	3	4	Total
**Falcons**	6	10	3	6	**25**
Panthers	7	7	3	0	**17**

at Bank of America Stadium, Charlotte, North Carolina

- Date: October 29
- Game time: 8:20 p.m. EDT
- Game weather: Partly cloudy, 76 °F (24 °C)
- Game attendance: 5,240
- Referee: Shawn Hochuli
- TV announcers (Fox/NFLN/Amazon Prime Video): Joe Buck, Troy Aikman, Erin Andrews and Kristina Pink
- Recap, Game Book

Game information

**First quarter**

- ATL – Younghoe Koo 20-yard field goal, 11:14. Falcons 3–0. **Drive: 7 plays, 72 yards, 3:46.**
- CAR – Curtis Samuel 12-yard run (Joey Slye kick), 0:29. Panthers 7–3. **Drive: 6 plays, 75 yards, 3:00.**
- ATL – Younghoe Koo 37-yard field goal, 2:36. Panthers 7–6. **Drive: 12 plays, 57 yards, 5:38.**

**Second quarter**

- CAR – Curtis Samuel 29-yard pass from Teddy Bridgewater (Joey Slye kick), 12:40. Panthers 14–6. **Drive: 4 plays, 40 yards, 2:07.**
- ATL – Matt Ryan 13-yard run (Younghoe Koo kick), 8:02. Panthers 14–13. **Drive: 10 plays, 75 yards, 4:38.**
- ATL – Younghoe Koo 36-yard field goal, 0:00. Falcons 16–14. **Drive: 10 plays, 47 yards, 3:55.**

**Third quarter**

- ATL – Younghoe Koo 29-yard field goal, 6:22. Falcons 19–14. **Drive: 10 plays, 46 yards, 5:10.**
- CAR – Joey Slye 39-yard field goal, 2:59. Falcons 19–17. **Drive: 11 plays, 48 yards, 3:23.**

**Fourth quarter**

- ATL – Todd Gurley 3-yard run (kick failed), 11:01. Falcons 25–17. **Drive: 11 plays, 75 yards, 6:58.**

**Top passers**

- ATL – Matt Ryan – 21/30, 281 yards, INT
- CAR – Teddy Bridgewater – 15/23, 176 yards, TD, INT

**Top rushers**

- ATL – Brian Hill – 11 rushes, 55 yards
- CAR – Mike Davis – 13 rushes, 66 yards

**Top receivers**

- ATL – Julio Jones – 7 receptions, 137 yards
- CAR – D. J. Moore – 2 receptions, 55 yards

==== Week 9: at Kansas City Chiefs ====
Week Nine: Carolina Panthers at Kansas City Chiefs – Game summary

Quarter	1	2	3	4	Total
Panthers	7	10	0	14	**31**
**Chiefs**	3	10	7	13	**33**

at Arrowhead Stadium, Kansas City, Missouri

- Date: November 8
- Game time: 1:00 p.m. EST/12:00 p.m. CST
- Game weather: Cloudy, 71 °F (22 °C)
- Game attendance: 12,073
- Referee: Clay Martin
- TV announcers (Fox): Kevin Burkhardt, Daryl Johnston and Pam Oliver
- Recap, Game Book

Game information

**First quarter**

- CAR – Christian McCaffrey 9-yard pass from Teddy Bridgewater (Joey Slye kick), 6:07. Panthers 7–0. **Drive: 15 plays, 17 yards, 8:53.**
- KC – Harrison Butker 39-yard field goal, 1:38. Panthers 7–3. **Drive: 12 plays, 54 yards, 4:29.**

**Second quarter**

- CAR – Curtis Samuel 14-yard pass from Teddy Bridgewater (Joey Slye kick), 12:39. Panthers 14–3. **Drive: 9 plays, 74 yards, 3:59.**
- KC – Harrison Butker 55-yard field goal, 11:01. Panthers 14–6. **Drive: 6 plays, 38 yards, 1:38.**
- KC – Demarcus Robinson 1-yard pass from Patrick Mahomes (Harrison Butker kick), 3:45. Panthers 14–13. **Drive: 7 plays, 65 yards, 3:44.**
- CAR – Joey Slye 47-yard field goal, 0:46. Panthers 17–13. **Drive: 9 plays, 50 yards, 2:59.**

**Third quarter**

- KC – Clyde Edwards-Helaire 4-yard pass from Patrick Mahomes (Harrison Butker kick), 4:42. Chiefs 20–17. **Drive: 5 plays, 59 yards, 2:17.**

**Fourth quarter**

- KC – Tyreek Hill 28-yard pass from Patrick Mahomes (failed kick), 14:23. Chiefs 26–17. **Drive: 6 plays, 69 yards, 1:56.**
- CAR – Teddy Bridgewater 4-yard run (Joey Slye kick), 10:22. Chiefs 26–24. **Drive: 9 plays, 70 yards, 4:01.**
- KC – Tyreek Hill 2-yard pass from Patrick Mahomes (Harrison Butker kick), 7:40. Chiefs 33–24. **Drive: 7 plays, 39 yards, 2:42.**
- CAR – Christian McCaffrey 1-yard run (Joey Slye kick), 1:53. Chiefs 33–31. **Drive: 11 plays, 75 yards, 5:47.**

**Top passers**

- CAR – Teddy Bridgewater – 36/49, 310 yards, 2 TD
- KC – Patrick Mahomes – 30/45, 372 yards, 4 TD

**Top rushers**

- CAR – Christian McCaffrey – 18 rushes, 69 yards, TD
- KC – Clyde Edwards-Helaire – 5 rushes, 14 yards

**Top receivers**

- CAR – Curtis Samuel – 9 receptions, 105 yards, TD
- KC – Travis Kelce – 10 receptions, 159 yards

==== Week 10: vs. Tampa Bay Buccaneers ====
Week Ten: Tampa Bay Buccaneers at Carolina Panthers – Game summary

Quarter	1	2	3	4	Total
**Buccaneers**	7	10	12	17	**46**
Panthers	14	3	0	6	**23**

at Bank of America Stadium, Charlotte, North Carolina

- Date: November 15
- Game time: 1:00 p.m. EST
- Game weather: Cloudy, 65 °F (18 °C)
- Game attendance: 5,815
- Referee: Land Clark
- TV announcers (Fox): Kevin Burkhardt, Daryl Johnston and Pam Oliver
- Recap, Game Book

Game information

**First quarter**

- CAR – Colin Thompson 7-yard pass from Teddy Bridgewater (Joey Slye kick), 8:19. Panthers 7–0. **Drive: 7 plays, 33 yards, 4:00.**
- TB – Cameron Brate 5-yard pass from Tom Brady (Ryan Succop kick), 3:37. Tied 7–7. **Drive: 10 plays, 75 yards, 4:42.**
- CAR – D. J. Moore 24-yard pass from Teddy Bridgewater (Joey Slye kick), 1:45. Panthers 14–7. **Drive: 4 plays, 75 yards, 1:52**

**Second quarter**

- TB – Ryan Succop 23-yard field goal, 9:59. Panthers 14–10. **Drive: 14 plays, 70 yards, 6:46.**
- CAR – Joey Slye 46-yard field goal, 3:56. Panthers 17–10. **Drive: 10 plays, 47 yards, 6:03.**
- TB – Mike Evans 3-yard pass from Tom Brady (Ryan Succop kick), 0:27. Tied 17–17. **Drive 9 plays, 75 yards, 3:29.**

**Third quarter**

- TB – Ryan Succop 24-yard field goal, 10:58. Buccaneers 20–17. **Drive: 10 plays, 69 yards, 4:02.**
- TB – Ronald Jones II 98-yard run (kick blocked), 7:39. Buccaneers 26–17. **Drive: 1 play, 98 yards, 0:14.**
- TB – Ryan Succop 24-yard field goal, 3:10. Buccaneers 29–17. **Drive: 9 plays, 35 yards, 4:21.**

**Fourth quarter**

- TB – Ryan Succop 40-yard field goal, 12:40. Buccaneers 32–17. **Drive" 8 plays, 13 yards, 3:23.**
- CAR – Teddy Bridgewater 3-yard run (pass failed), 11:23. Buccaneers 32–23. **Drive: 2 plays, 4 yards, 1:17.**
- TB – Tom Brady 1-yard run (Ryan Succop kick), 6:18. Buccaneers 39–23. **Drive: 9 plays, 75 yards, 5:05.**
- TB – Rob Gronkowski 7-yard pass from Tom Brady (Ryan Succop kick), 4:24. Buccaneers 46–23. **Drive: 4 plays, 21 yards, 0:28.**

**Top passers**

- TB – Tom Brady – 28/39, 341 yards, 3 TD
- CAR – Teddy Bridgewater – 18/24, 136 yards, 2 TD, INT

**Top rushers**

- TB – Ronald Jones II – 23 rushes, 192 yards, TD
- CAR – Mike Davis – 7 rushes, 32 yards

**Top receivers**

- TB – Chris Godwin – 6 receptions, 92 yards
- CAR – D. J. Moore – 4 receptions, 96 yards, TD

==== Week 11: vs. Detroit Lions ====
Week Eleven: Detroit Lions at Carolina Panthers – Game summary

Quarter	1	2	3	4	Total
Lions	0	0	0	0	**0**
**Panthers**	7	0	10	3	**20**

at Bank of America Stadium, Charlotte, North Carolina

- Date: November 22
- Game time: 1:00 p.m. EST
- Game weather: Cloudy, 65 °F (18 °C)
- Game attendance: 5,546
- Referee: Ronald Torbert
- TV announcers (Fox): Kevin Kugler, Chris Spielman and Laura Okmin
- Recap, Game Book

Game information

**First quarter**

- CAR - Mike Davis 1-yard run (Joey Slye kick), 2:21. Panthers 7–0. 'Drive: 10 plays, 95 yards, 6:03.

**Second quarter**

- No scoring plays.

**Third quarter**

- CAR – Curtis Samuel 17-yard pass from P. J. Walker (Joey Slye kick), 11:06. Panthers 14–0. 'Drive: 6 plays, 66 yards, 3:09.
- CAR – Joey Slye 56-yard field goal, 2:04. Panthers 17–0. Drive: 9 plays, 37 yards, 5:33.

**Fourth quarter**

- CAR – Joey Slye 37-yard field goal, 5:00. Panthers 20–0. 'Drive: 5 plays, 3 yards, 1:20.

**Top passers**

- DET – Matthew Stafford – 18/33, 178 yards
- CAR – P. J. Walker – 24/34, 258 yards, TD, 2 INTs

**Top rushers**

- DET – Adrian Peterson – 7 rushes, 18 yards
- CAR – Mike Davis – 19 rushes, 64 yards, TD

**Top receivers**

- DET – T. J. Hockenson – 4 receptions, 69 yards
- CAR – D. J. Moore – 7 receptions, 127 yards

This was the Panthers' first shutout win since week 14 of 2015. It was also QB P. J. Walker's first NFL start.

==== Week 12: at Minnesota Vikings ====
Week Twelve: Carolina Panthers at Minnesota Vikings – Game summary

Quarter	1	2	3	4	Total
Panthers	0	7	14	6	**27**
**Vikings**	7	3	0	18	**28**

at U.S. Bank Stadium, Minneapolis, Minnesota

- Date: November 29
- Game time: 1:00 p.m. EST/12:00 p.m. CST
- Game weather: None (indoor stadium)
- Game attendance: 0
- Referee: Brad Rogers
- TV announcers (Fox): Kenny Albert, Jonathan Vilma and Shannon Spake
- Recap, Game Book

Game information

**First quarter**

- MIN – Justin Jefferson 12-yard pass from Kirk Cousins (Dan Bailey kick), 5:34. Vikings 7–0. **Drive: 13 plays, 68 yards, 7:38.**

**Second quarter**

- CAR – Robby Anderson 41-yard pass from Teddy Bridgewater (Joey Slye kick), 1:52. Tied 7–7. **Drive: 11 plays, 81 yards, 5:33.**
- MIN – Dan Bailey 53-yard field goal, 0:00. Vikings 10–7. **Drive: 11 plays, 41 yards, 1:52.**

**Third quarter**

- CAR – Jeremy Chinn 17-yard fumble return (Joey Slye kick), 14:01. Panthers 14–10.
- CAR – Jeremy Chinn 28-yard fumble return (Joey Slye kick), 13:51. Panthers 21–10.

**Fourth quarter**

- MIN – Dan Bailey 25-yard field goal, 14:47. Panthers 21–13. **Drive: 12 plays, 72 yards, 5:34.**
- CAR – Joey Slye 40-yard field goal, 11:31. Panthers 24–13. **Drive: 9 plays, 53 yards, 3:16.**
- MIN – Justin Jefferson 10-yard pass from Kirk Cousins (Kirk Cousins–Bisi Johnson pass), 5:31. Panthers 24–21. **Drive: 11 plays, 75 yards, 6:00.**
- CAR – Joey Slye 21-yard field goal, 1:51. Panthers 27–21. **Drive: 4 plays, 6 yards, 0:19.**
- MIN – Chad Beebe 10-yard pass from Kirk Cousins (Dan Bailey kick), 0:46. Vikings 28–27. **Drive: 7 plays, 75 yards, 1:05.**

**Top passers**

- CAR – Teddy Bridgewater – 19/36, 267 yards, TD, INT
- MIN – Kirk Cousins – 34/45, 307 yards, 3 TD

**Top rushers**

- CAR – Mike Davis – 15 rushes, 55 yards
- MIN – Dalvin Cook – 18 rushes, 61 yards

**Top receivers**

- CAR – Robby Anderson – 4 receptions, 94 yards, TD
- MIN – Bisi Johnson – 7 receptions, 74 yards

In the final minutes of the game, the Panthers had a 27–21 lead over Minnesota. However, Kirk Cousins threw the game-winning touchdown with 46 seconds left.

==== Week 14: vs. Denver Broncos ====
Week Fourteen: Denver Broncos at Carolina Panthers – Game summary

Quarter	1	2	3	4	Total
**Broncos**	6	7	12	7	**32**
Panthers	0	7	3	17	**27**

at Bank of America Stadium, Charlotte, North Carolina

- Date: December 13
- Game time: 1:00 p.m. EST
- Game weather: Partly cloudy, 70 °F (21 °C)
- Game attendance: 5,768
- Referee: Shawn Hochuli
- TV announcers (CBS): Andrew Catalon, James Lofton and Sherree Burruss
- Recap, Game Book

Game information

**First quarter**

- DEN – Diontae Spencer 83-yard punt return (kick failed), 10:18. Broncos 6–0.

**Second quarter**

- CAR – Mike Davis 3-yard run (Joey Slye kick), 6:15. Panthers 7–6. **Drive: 2 plays, 3 yards, 0:07.**
- DEN – Nick Vannett 2-yard pass from Drew Lock (Brandon McManus kick), 1:33. Broncos 13–7. **Drive: 12 plays, 75 yards, 4:42.**

**Third quarter**

- DEN – K. J. Hamler 37-yard pass from Drew Lock (kick failed), 11:04. Broncos 19–7. **Drive: 4 plays, 63 yards, 2:07.**
- CAR – Joey Slye 35-yard field goal, 6:53. Broncos 19–10. **Drive: 11 plays, 58 yards, 4:11.**
- DEN – Tim Patrick 2-yard pass from Drew Lock (pass failed), 3:35. Broncos 25–10. **Drive: 7 plays, 75 yards, 3:18.**

**Fourth quarter**

- CAR – Teddy Bridgewater 7-yard run (Joey Slye kick), 13:31. Broncos 25–17. **Drive: 9 plays, 75 yards, 5:04.**
- CAR – Joey Slye 26-yard field goal, 5:12. Broncos 25–20. **Drive: 10 plays, 74 yards, 5:03.**
- DEN – K. J. Hamler 49-yard pass from Drew Lock (Brandon McManus kick), 3:54. Broncos 32–20. **Drive: 3 plays, 75 yards, 1:18.**
- CAR – Mike Davis 10-yard run (Joey Slye kick), 3:26. Broncos 32–27. **Drive: 4 plays, 75 yards, 0:28.**

**Top passers**

- DEN – Drew Lock – 21/27, 280 yards, 4 TD
- CAR – Teddy Bridgewater – 30/40, 283 yards

**Top rushers**

- DEN – Melvin Gordon – 13 rushes, 68 yards
- CAR – Mike Davis – 11 rushes, 51 yards, 2 TD

**Top receivers**

- DEN – Troy Fumagalli – 4 receptions, 53 yards
- CAR – Robby Anderson – 8 receptions, 84 yards

With this loss, the Carolina Panthers are 1–6 in their last 7 games versus Denver.

==== Week 15: at Green Bay Packers ====
Week Fifteen: Carolina Panthers at Green Bay Packers – Game summary

Quarter	1	2	3	4	Total
Panthers	3	0	7	6	**16**
**Packers**	7	14	0	3	**24**

at Lambeau Field, Green Bay, Wisconsin

- Date: December 19
- Game time: 8:15 p.m. EST/7:15 p.m. CST
- Game weather: Cloudy, 33 °F (1 °C)
- Game attendance: 0
- Referee: Alex Kemp
- TV announcers (NFLN): Joe Davis, Kurt Warner and Melissa Stark
- Recap, Game Book

Game information

**First quarter**

- GB – Robert Tonyan 1-yard pass from Aaron Rodgers (Mason Crosby kick), 9:54. Packers 7–0. **Drive: 7 plays, 81 yards, 3:43.**
- CAR – Joey Slye 36-yard field goal, 5:57. Packers 7–3. **Drive: 8 plays, 57 yards, 3:57.**

**Second quarter**

- GB – Aaron Rodgers 6-yard run (Mason Crosby kick), 14:09. Packers 14–3. **Drive: 13 plays, 75 yards, 6:48.**
- GB – Aaron Jones 8-yard run (Mason Crosby kick), 3:58. Packers 21–3. **Drive: 7 plays, 47 yards, 3:31.**

**Third quarter**

- CAR – Teddy Bridgewater 13-yard run (Joey Slye kick), 5:15. Packers 21–10. **Drive: 7 plays, 51 yards, 3:53.**

**Fourth quarter**

- CAR – Joey Slye 22-yard field goal, 8:39. Packers 21–13. **Drive: 16 plays, 76 yards, 8:44.**
- GB – Mason Crosby 51-yard field goal, 3:39. Packers 24–13. **Drive: 10 plays, 42 yards, 5:00.**
- CAR – Joey Slye 33-yard field goal, 2:04. Packers 24–16. **Drive: 6 plays, 61 yards, 1:35.**

**Top passers**

- CAR – Teddy Bridgewater – 21/35, 258 yards
- GB – Aaron Rodgers – 20/29, 143 yards, TD

**Top rushers**

- CAR – Mike Davis – 14 rushes, 59 yards
- GB – Aaron Jones – 20 rushes, 145 yards, TD

**Top receivers**

- CAR – D. J. Moore – 6 receptions, 131 yards
- GB – Allen Lazard – 5 receptions, 56 yards

==== Week 16: at Washington Football Team ====
Week Sixteen: Carolina Panthers at Washington Football Team – Game summary

Quarter	1	2	3	4	Total
**Panthers**	6	14	0	0	**20**
Washington	0	3	3	7	**13**

at FedExField, Landover, Maryland

- Date: December 27
- Game time: 4:05 p.m. EST
- Game weather: Sunny, 41 °F (5 °C)
- Game attendance: 0
- Referee: Carl Cheffers
- TV announcers (CBS): Ian Eagle, Charles Davis and Evan Washburn
- Recap, Game Book

Game information

**First quarter**

- CAR – Brandon Zylstra fumble recovery in end zone (kick failed), 1:42. Panthers 6–0.

**Second quarter**

- CAR – Mike Davis 1-yard run (Joey Slye kick), 8:37. Panthers 13–0. **Drive: 10 plays, 80 yards, 6:14.**
- CAR – Robby Anderson 14-yard pass from Teddy Bridgewater (Joey Slye kick), 3:06. Panthers 20–0. **Drive: 6 plays, 55 yards, 3:34.**
- WAS – Dustin Hopkins 48-yard field goal, 1:20. Panthers 20–3. **Drive: 9 plays, 45 yards, 1:46.**

**Third quarter**

- WAS – Dustin Hopkins 26-yard field goal, 4:01. Panthers 20–6. **Drive: 7 plays, 66 yards, 2:56.**

**Fourth quarter**

- WAS – J. D. McKissic 29-yard pass from Taylor Heinicke (Dustin Hopkins kick), 1:50. Panthers 20–13. **Drive: 8 plays, 91 yards, 1:19.**

**Top passers**

- CAR – Teddy Bridgewater – 19/28, 197 yards, TD, INT
- WAS – Dwayne Haskins – 14/28, 154 yards, 2 INT

**Top rushers**

- CAR – Curtis Samuel – 7 rushes, 52 yards
- WAS – Antonio Gibson – 10 rushes, 61 yards

**Top receivers**

- CAR – Curtis Samuel – 5 receptions, 106 yards
- WAS – J. D. McKissic – 8 receptions, 77 yards, TD

With the win against the Washington Football Team, the Panthers recorded their 200th win in franchise history.

==== Week 17: vs. New Orleans Saints ====
Week Seventeen: New Orleans Saints at Carolina Panthers – Game summary

Quarter	1	2	3	4	Total
**Saints**	7	9	10	7	**33**
Panthers	7	0	0	0	**7**

at Bank of America Stadium, Charlotte, North Carolina

- Date: January 3, 2021
- Game time: 4:25 p.m. EST
- Game weather: Cloudy, 57 °F (14 °C)
- Game attendance: 1,500
- Referee: John Hussey
- TV announcers (Fox): Adam Amin, Mark Schlereth and Lindsay Czarniak
- Recap, Game Book

Game information

**First quarter**

- NO – Jared Cook 18-yard pass from Drew Brees (Wil Lutz kick), 9:04. Saints 7–0. **Drive: 8 plays, 42 yards, 4:24.**
- CAR – Rodney Smith 1-yard run (Joey Slye kick), 1:40. Tied 7–7. **Drive: 7 plays, 64 yards, 4:10.**

**Second quarter**

- NO – Emmanuel Sanders 8-yard pass from Drew Brees (Wil Lutz kick failed), 8:12. Saints 13–7. **Drive: 5 plays, 54 yards, 2:25.**
- NO – Wil Lutz 33-yard field goal, 0:00. Saints 16–7. **Drive: 10 plays, 63 yards, 2:47.**

**Third quarter**

- NO – Wil Lutz 48-yard field goal, 11:49. Saints 19–7. **Drive: 8 plays, 46 yards, 3:11.**
- NO – Taysom Hill 3-yard run (Wil Lutz kick), 4:56. Saints 26–7. **Drive: 3 plays, 24 yards, 1:06.**

**Fourth quarter**

- NO – Austin Carr 11-yard pass from Drew Brees (Wil Lutz kick), 14:55. Saints 33–7. **Drive: 8 plays, 57 yards, 4:27.**

**Top passers**

- NO – Drew Brees – 22/32, 201 yards, 3 TD
- CAR – Teddy Bridgewater – 13/23, 176 yards, 2 INT

**Top rushers**

- NO – Ty Montgomery – 18 rushes, 105 yards
- CAR – Rodney Smith – 10 rushes, 40 yards, TD

**Top receivers**

- NO – Emmanuel Sanders – 9 receptions, 63 yards, TD
- CAR – Curtis Samuel – 7 receptions, 118 yards

=== Standings ===
==== Division ====
NFC South
	W	L	T	PCT	DIV	CONF	PF	PA	STK
^{(2)} New Orleans Saints	12	4	0	.750	6–0	10–2	482	337	W2
^{(5)} Tampa Bay Buccaneers	11	5	0	.688	4–2	8–4	492	355	W4
Carolina Panthers	5	11	0	.313	1–5	4–8	350	402	L1
Atlanta Falcons	4	12	0	.250	1–5	2–10	396	414	L5

==== Conference ====
NFC
#	Team	Division	W	L	T	PCT	DIV	CONF	SOS	SOV	STK
**Division leaders**
1	Green Bay Packers	North	13	3	0	.813	5–1	10–2	.428	.387	W6
2 (Note: New Orleans finished ahead of Seattle based on conference record.)	New Orleans Saints	South	12	4	0	.750	6–0	10–2	.459	.406	W2
3	Seattle Seahawks	West	12	4	0	.750	4–2	9–3	.447	.404	W4
4	Washington Football Team	East	7	9	0	.438	4–2	5–7	.459	.388	W1
**Wild cards**
5	Tampa Bay Buccaneers	South	11	5	0	.688	4–2	8–4	.488	.392	W4
6	Los Angeles Rams	West	10	6	0	.625	3–3	9–3	.494	.484	W1
7 (Note: Chicago finished and clinched the 7th and final playoff spot ahead of Arizona based on better win percentage in common games (against Detroit, the NY Giants, Carolina, and the LA Rams, Chicago finished 3–2, while Arizona finished 1–4).)	Chicago Bears	North	8	8	0	.500	2–4	6–6	.488	.336	L1
**Did not qualify for the postseason**
8	Arizona Cardinals	West	8	8	0	.500	2–4	6–6	.475	.441	L2
9	Minnesota Vikings	North	7	9	0	.438	4–2	5–7	.504	.366	W1
10 (Note: San Francisco finished ahead of the NY Giants based on head-to-head victory. Division tie break was initially used to eliminate Dallas (see below).)	San Francisco 49ers	West	6	10	0	.375	3–3	4–8	.549	.448	L1
11 (Note: NY Giants won tiebreaker over Dallas based on division record.)	New York Giants	East	6	10	0	.375	4–2	5–7	.502	.427	W1
12	Dallas Cowboys	East	6	10	0	.375	2–4	5–7	.471	.333	L1
13 (Note: Carolina finished ahead of Detroit based on head-to-head victory.)	Carolina Panthers	South	5	11	0	.313	1–5	4–8	.531	.388	L1
14	Detroit Lions	North	5	11	0	.313	1–5	4–8	.508	.350	L4
15	Philadelphia Eagles	East	4	11	1	.281	2–4	4–8	.537	.469	L3
16	Atlanta Falcons	South	4	12	0	.250	1–5	2–10	.551	.391	L5
**Tiebreakers** (Note: When breaking ties for three or more teams under the NFL's rules, they are first broken within divisions, then comparing only the highest-ranked remaining team from each division.)
