= Stantley Thomas-Oliver III =

American gridiron football player (born 1998)

- Thomas-Oliver III with the BC Lions in 2026

No. 23 – BC Lions
- Position: Cornerback/Defensive back
- Roster status: Active
- CFL status: American

Personal information
- Born: June 4, 1998 (age 28); Tallahassee, Florida, U.S.
- Listed height: 6 ft 0 in (1.83 m)
- Listed weight: 194 lb (88 kg)

Career information
- High school: Charlotte (Punta Gorda, Florida)
- College: FIU (2016–2019)
- NFL draft: 2020: 7th round, 221st overall pick

Career history
- Carolina Panthers (2020–2023); New York Giants (2023)*; Birmingham Stallions (2024)*; Detroit Lions (2024); BC Lions (2026–present)
- * Offseason or practice squad member only

Awards and highlights
- Second-team All-C-USA (2019); C-USA All-Freshman Team (2016)

Career NFL statistics
- Total tackles: 17
- Stats at Pro Football Reference

Stantley Thomas-Oliver III (born June 4, 1998) is an American professional football cornerback/defensive back for the BC Lions of the Canadian Football League (CFL). He played college football for the FIU Panthers.

== College career ==
Thomas-Oliver III began his career at Florida International University as a wide receiver and had 36 receptions for 489 yards and a touchdown in two seasons. He became a cornerback prior to his junior year after jokingly covering teammates in practice, making 24 starts over his last two seasons. In his first year at the new position, Thomas-Oliver III was a 2018 All-Conference USA Honorable Mention. As a senior, he earned second-team All-Conference USA honors after posting eight passes defensed, an interception, 2.0 sacks, and 4.0 tackles for loss. In his career he had 94 career, two interceptions, seven tackles for loss and 2.0 sacks.

== Professional career ==
Pre-draft measurables
Height	Weight	Arm length	Hand span	Wingspan	40-yard dash	10-yard split	20-yard split	Vertical jump	Broad jump
6 ft 0 3/8 in (1.84 m)	192 lb (87 kg)	31 1/8 in (0.79 m)	9 5/8 in (0.24 m)	6 ft 2 5/8 in (1.90 m)	4.48 s	1.51 s	2.63 s	34.0 in (0.86 m)	10 ft 7 in (3.23 m)
All values from NFL Combine/Pro Day

=== Carolina Panthers ===
On April 25, 2020, Thomas-Oliver III was selected in the seventh round, 221st overall, of the 2020 NFL draft by the Carolina Panthers.

On November 20, 2021, Thomas-Oliver III was placed on injured reserve. He was activated on December 18, 2021.

On October 16, 2022, Thomas-Oliver III was placed on injured reserve.

On August 29, 2023, Thomas-Oliver III was waived during final roster cuts, but was signed to the Panthers' practice squad the following day. He was released on September 22, 2023.

=== New York Giants ===
On October 30, 2023, Thomas-Oliver III was signed to the New York Giants' practice squad. Following the end of the 2023 regular season, the Giants signed him to a reserve/future contract on January 8, 2024. He was waived on July 31, 2024 with a non-football injury designation.

=== Birmingham Stallions ===
On November 18, 2024, Thomas-Oliver III signed with the Birmingham Stallions.

=== Detroit Lions ===
On December 17, 2024, Thomas-Oliver III left the Stallions to sign with the Detroit Lions' practice squad. He was signed to the team's active roster on January 4, 2025.

Thomas-Oliver III signed a reserve/future contract with Detroit on January 20, 2025. On July 27, 2025, Thomas-Oliver III was released by the Lions.

=== BC Lions ===
On May 18, 2026, Thomas-Oliver III signed as a defensive back with the BC Lions of the Canadian Football League (CFL). On May 31, 2026, Thomas-Oliver III was assigned to the Lions' practice roster to start the 2026 CFL season. Before the start of week 11, Thomas-Oliver was promoted to the Lions' active roster. On September 3, 2026, Thomas-Oliver III was placed on the Lions' reserve roster. He rejoined the active roster on September 11, 2026. On October 30, 2026, Thomas-Oliver III was placed on the Lions' 1-game injured list ahead of the Western Semi-Final. He rejoined the active roster on November 6, 2026, ahead of the West Final.
