= Mike Davis (running back) =

American football player (born 1993)

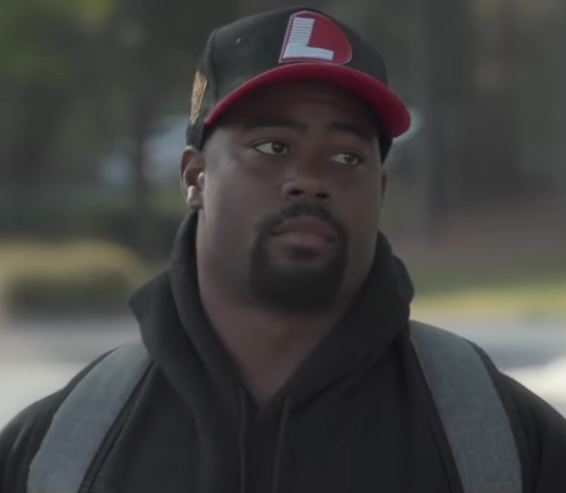
- Davis in 2021

No. 22, 39, 27, 25, 28
- Position: Running back

Personal information
- Born: February 19, 1993 (age 33); Atlanta, Georgia, U.S.
- Listed height: 5 ft 9 in (1.75 m)
- Listed weight: 220 lb (100 kg)

Career information
- High school: Stephenson (Stone Mountain, Georgia)
- College: South Carolina (2012–2014)
- NFL draft: 2015: 4th round, 126th overall pick

Career history
- San Francisco 49ers (2015–2016); Seattle Seahawks (2017–2018); Chicago Bears (2019); Carolina Panthers (2019–2020); Atlanta Falcons (2021); Baltimore Ravens (2022)

Awards and highlights
- Second-team All-SEC (2013)

Career NFL statistics
- Rushing yards: 2,052
- Rushing average: 3.7
- Rushing touchdowns: 14
- Receptions: 171
- Receiving yards: 1,066
- Receiving touchdowns: 4
- Stats at Pro Football Reference

Mike Davis (born February 19, 1993) is an American former professional football player who was a running back for eight seasons in the National Football League (NFL). He played college football for the South Carolina Gamecocks, and was selected by the San Francisco 49ers in the fourth round of the 2015 NFL draft. Davis also played for the Seattle Seahawks, Chicago Bears, Carolina Panthers, Atlanta Falcons, and Baltimore Ravens.

== Early life ==
Davis attended Stephenson High School in Stone Mountain, Georgia, where he played football and ran track for the Jaguars athletic teams. As a senior, he rushed for 1,923 yards on 213 carries with 21 touchdowns. He was ranked as the seventh best running back recruit by Rivals.com. In track & field, Davis posted an 11.84-second 100-meter dash. Davis was originally committed to the University of Florida but changed his mind and attended the University of South Carolina.

== College career ==
Davis attended and played college football at the University of South Carolina from 2012 to 2014 under head coach Steve Spurrier.

As a true freshman in 2012, Davis rushed for 275 yards on 52 carries and two touchdowns. Davis took over as the starting running back in 2013, following Marcus Lattimore's departure. He rushed for 1,183 yards with 11 touchdowns and was a second-team All-Southeastern Conference (SEC) selection. As a junior in 2014, he rushed for 982 yards and nine touchdowns.

On December 25, 2014, Davis announced that he would forgo his senior season and enter the 2015 NFL draft.

== Professional career ==
Pre-draft measurables
Height	Weight	Arm length	Hand span	Wingspan	40-yard dash	10-yard split	20-yard split	20-yard shuttle	Three-cone drill	Vertical jump	Broad jump	Bench press
5 ft 9 1/8 in (1.76 m)	217 lb (98 kg)	30 1/4 in (0.77 m)	9 3/8 in (0.24 m)	6 ft 0 1/4 in (1.84 m)	4.52 s	1.62 s	2.61 s	4.18 s	7.00 s	35.5 in (0.90 m)	9 ft 8 in (2.95 m)	17 reps
All values from NFL Combine/Pro Day

=== San Francisco 49ers ===
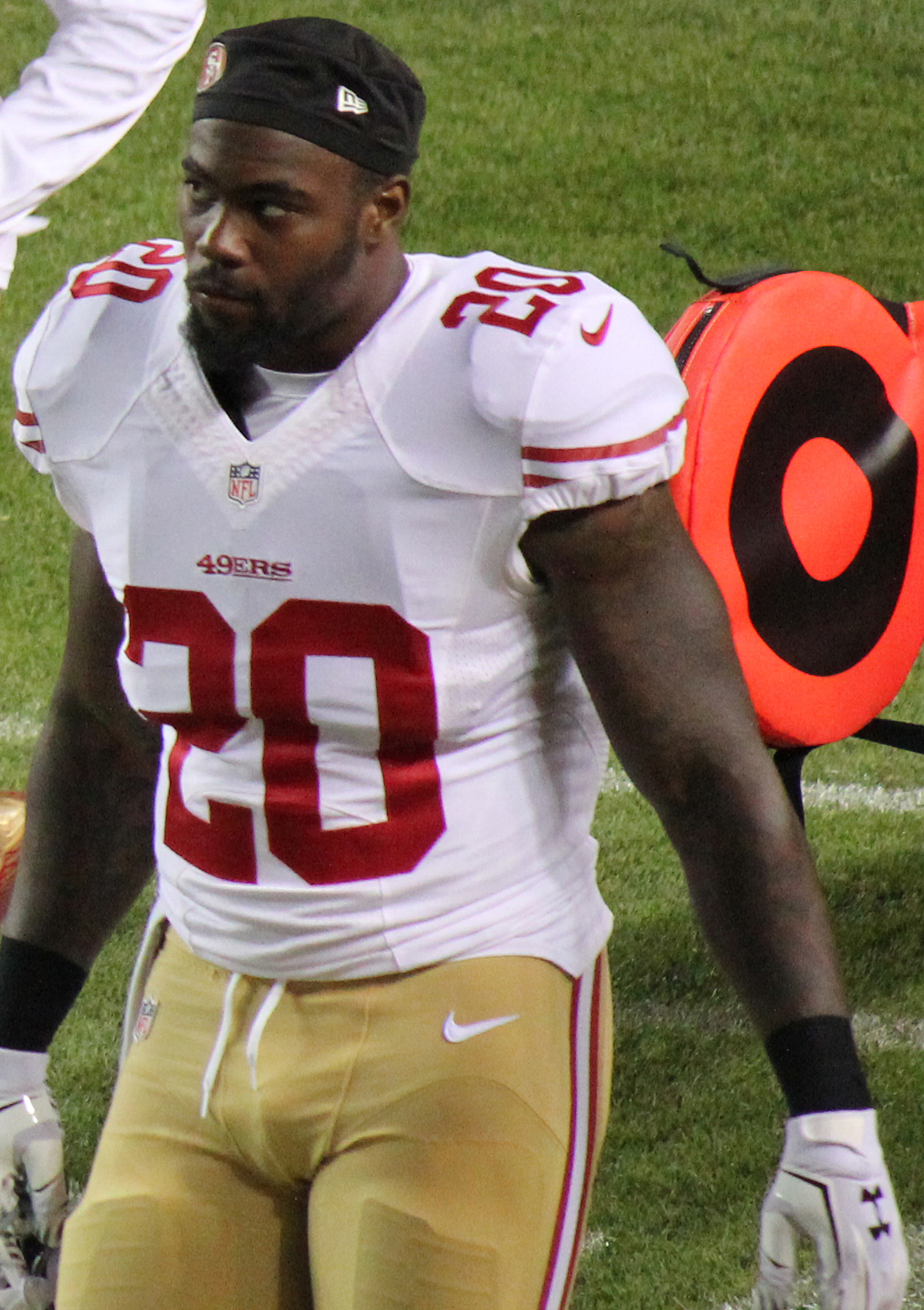
Davis with the San Francisco 49ers in 2015

On May 2, 2015, Davis was selected by the San Francisco 49ers in the fourth round of the 2015 NFL draft with the 126th overall pick. On September 20, 2015, Davis made his NFL debut against the Pittsburgh Steelers, backing up Carlos Hyde who had to leave the field injured. He finished his rookie season with 58 rushing yards and 38 receiving yards.

On October 23, 2016, Davis had his first-career touchdown against the Tampa Bay Buccaneers. Overall, he finished the 2016 season with 50 rushing yards and a rushing touchdown to go along with 25 receiving yards. On May 5, 2017, Davis was released by the 49ers after failing to trade him during the 2017 NFL draft.

=== Seattle Seahawks ===
On May 8, 2017, Davis was claimed off waivers by the Seattle Seahawks. He was waived on September 2, and was signed to the Seahawks' practice squad the next day. He was promoted to the active roster on November 14. He finished the 2017 season with 240 rushing yards to go along with 15 receptions for 131 receiving yards.

On March 22, 2018, Davis re-signed with the Seahawks. In Week 4, against the Arizona Cardinals, Davis recorded 21 carries for 101 rushing yards and two rushing touchdowns in the 20–17 victory. Overall, he finished the 2018 season with 514 rushing yards, four rushing touchdowns, 34 receptions, 214 receiving yards, and one receiving touchdown. The Seahawks earned the #5-seed in the NFC. Against the Dallas Cowboys in the Wild Card Round, he had 32 scrimmage yards and converted a two-point conversion in the 24–22 loss.

=== Chicago Bears ===
On March 13, 2019, Davis signed a two-year, $6 million contract with the Chicago Bears. In Davis' first game as a Bear, he rushed five times for 19 yards and caught six passes for 17 yards as the Bears lost to the Green Bay Packers by a score of 10–3. He was released on November 9. In the 2019 season, he played in 12 games and recorded 13 carries for 27 rushing yards to go along with seven receptions for 22 receiving yards.

=== Carolina Panthers ===
On November 11, 2019, the Carolina Panthers claimed Davis off waivers.

Prior to the 2020 season, Davis was listed as one of the backups on the depth chart behind All-Pro Christian McCaffrey. In Week 2, McCaffrey suffered an ankle injury and was place on injured reserve, making Davis the Panthers' starting running back. In Week 4 against the Cardinals, Davis recorded 111 yards from scrimmage and his first rushing touchdown of the season during the 31–21 win. In Week 5 against the Atlanta Falcons, Davis recorded 149 yards from scrimmage and a receiving touchdown during the 23–16 win. In Week 14, against the Denver Broncos, he had 93 scrimmage yards and two rushing touchdowns in the 32–27 loss. In the 2020 season, Davis had 165 carries for 642 rushing yard and six rushing touchdowns to go along with 59 receptions for 373 receiving yards and two receiving touchdowns.

=== Atlanta Falcons ===
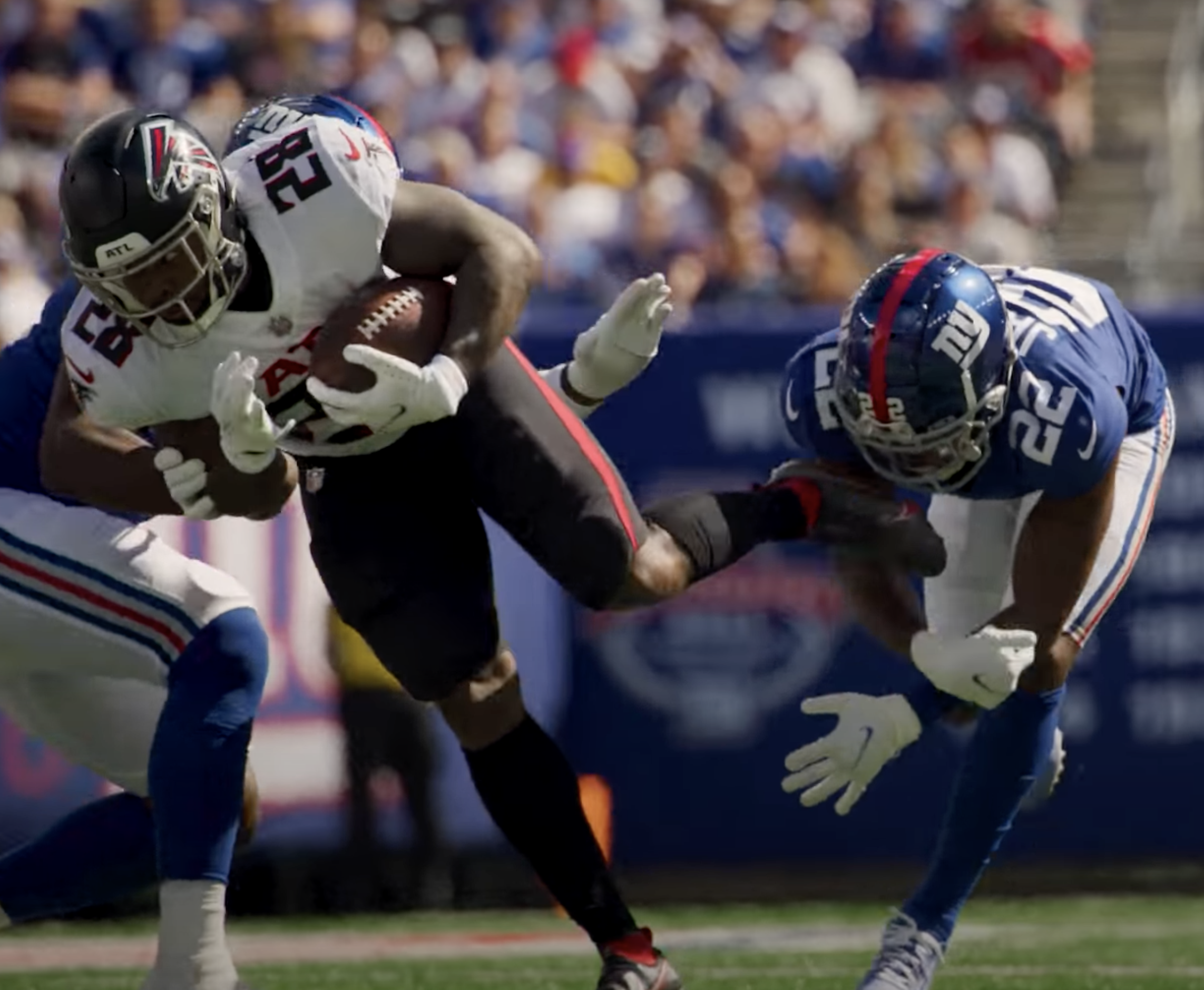
Davis (left) with the Atlanta Falcons in 2021

On March 25, 2021, Davis signed a two-year, $5.5 million deal with his hometown Falcons. He entered the season as the Falcons starting running back, but lost playing time as the season went on to Cordarrelle Patterson. He finished the season second on the team in rushing with 503 yards and three touchdowns along with 259 receiving yards and one touchdown.

On May 2, 2022, Davis was released by the Falcons.

=== Baltimore Ravens ===
On May 10, 2022, Davis signed with the Baltimore Ravens. He was released by the Ravens on December 10, 2022.

Davis announced his retirement on February 19, 2024.

== Career statistics ==
=== NFL ===
Year	Team	Games		Rushing					Receiving				
Year	Team	GP	GS	Att	Yds	Avg	Lng	TD	Rec	Yds	Avg	Lng	TD
2015	SF	6	0	35	58	1.7	13	0	7	38	5.4	11	0
2016	SF	8	1	19	50	2.6	8	1	3	25	8.3	10	0
2017	SEA	6	6	68	240	3.5	33	0	15	131	8.7	23	0
2018	SEA	15	2	112	514	4.6	37	4	34	214	6.3	18	1
2019	CHI	7	1	11	25	2.3	8	0	7	22	3.1	7	0
2019	CAR	5	0	2	2	1.0	2	0	0	0	0.0	0	0
2020	CAR	15	12	165	642	3.9	25	6	59	373	6.3	23	2
2021	ATL	16	8	132	473	3.6	18	3	41	261	6.4	20	1
2022	BAL	8	0	8	18	2.3	10	0	2	4	2	7	0
Career		78	30	544	2,004	3.7	37	14	166	1,064	6.4	23	4

=== College ===
Season	Team	Rushing					Receiving			
Season	Team	Att	Yds	Avg	Lng	TD	Rec	Yds	Avg	TD
2012	South Carolina	52	275	5.3	50	2	4	35	8.8	0
2013	South Carolina	203	1,183	5.8	75	11	34	352	10.4	0
2014	South Carolina	199	982	4.9	40	9	32	368	11.5	2
Career		454	2,440	5.4	75	22	70	755	10.8	2

== Personal life ==
His brother, James Davis, was also a running back and played college football at Clemson University and in the NFL from 2009 to 2011.
