= 2020 New Orleans Saints season =

54th season in franchise history

- Owner: Gayle Benson
- General manager: Mickey Loomis
- Head coach: Sean Payton
- Offensive coordinator: Pete Carmichael Jr.
- Defensive coordinator: Dennis Allen
- Home stadium: Mercedes-Benz Superdome

Results
- Record: 12–4
- Division place: 1st NFC South
- Playoffs: Won Wild Card Playoffs (vs. Bears) 21–9; Lost Divisional Playoffs (vs. Buccaneers) 20–30
- All-Pros: 3: RB Alvin Kamara (2nd team); RT Ryan Ramczyk (2nd team); LB Demario Davis (2nd team)
- Pro Bowlers: 5: RB Alvin Kamara; T Terron Armstead; G Andrus Peat; DE Cameron Jordan; CB Marshon Lattimore

Uniform
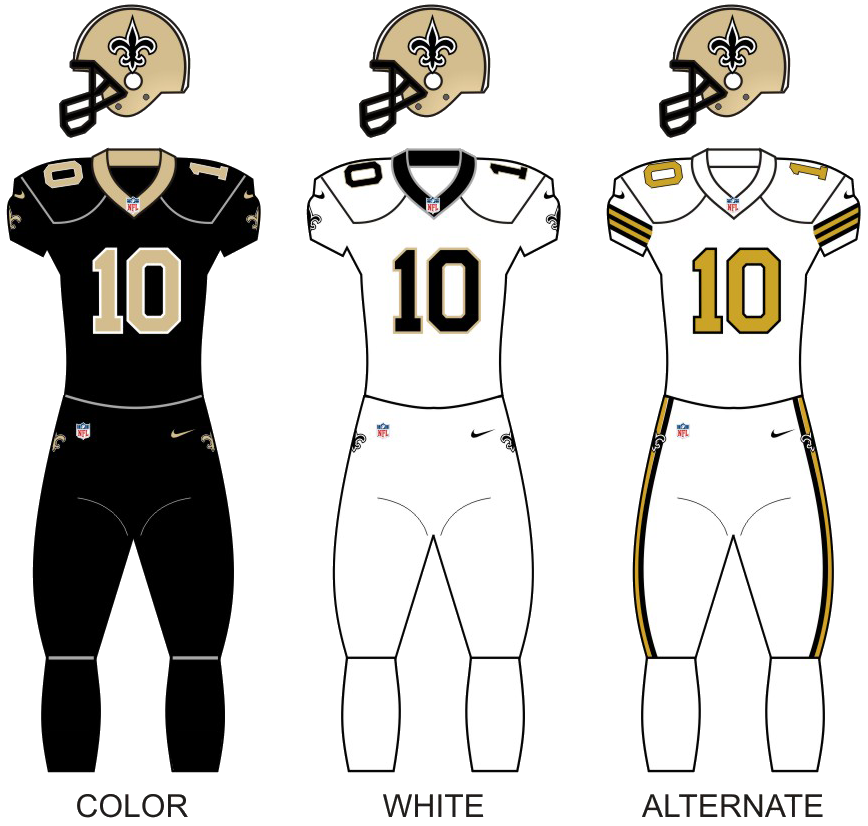

The 2020 season was the New Orleans Saints' 54th season in the National Football League (NFL), their 45th playing home games at the Mercedes-Benz Superdome, and their 14th under head coach Sean Payton. Although they failed to match their 13–3 records from 2018 and 2019, the Saints defended their NFC South title for the fourth consecutive year following a Week 16 victory over the Minnesota Vikings. After beating the San Francisco 49ers in Week 10, they won six straight games for the fourth consecutive season. With a Week 13 win over the Atlanta Falcons, the Saints clinched a franchise record fourth consecutive playoff appearance. After Week 17 victory over the division rival, Carolina Panthers, the Saints became the first NFC South member to sweep the division in its history. During the Wildcard round against the Chicago Bears of the 2020–21 NFL playoffs, the Saints made history as one of the first two teams to air in a post-season football game on Nickelodeon, a primarily children-related network. The Saints would defeat the Bears 21–9, advancing to the divisional round, where they were defeated by division rival and eventual Super Bowl champion Tampa Bay Buccaneers, 30–20, despite having swept them in the regular season.

This season would also be the final of longtime quarterback Drew Brees, as he would announce his retirement on March 14, 2021, after twenty seasons of playing in the NFL, with fifteen of those with the Saints.

== Roster changes ==
=== Free agency ===
==== Unrestricted ====
Position	Player	2020 team	Date signed	Contract
MLB	Stephone Anthony	Arizona Cardinals (PS)	November 16, 2020	1 year $84k
CB	Eli Apple	Carolina Panthers	May 28, 2020	1 year, $3 million
CB	Johnson Bademosi	New Orleans Saints	April 23, 2020	1 year, $1.1875 million
SS	Vonn Bell	Cincinnati Bengals	March 25, 2020	3 years, $18 million
QB	Drew Brees	New Orleans Saints	March 17, 2020	2 years, $50 million
QB	Teddy Bridgewater	Carolina Panthers	March 17, 2020	3 years, $63 million
WR	Ted Ginn Jr.	Chicago Bears	April 30, 2020	1 year, $1.1875 million
LB	A. J. Klein	Buffalo Bills	March 16, 2020	3 years, $18 million
OLB	Josh Martin			
G	Patrick Omameh	New Orleans Saints	May 14, 2020	1 year, $1.1875 million
G	Andrus Peat	New Orleans Saints	March 20, 2020	5 years, $57.5 million
DE	Noah Spence	New Orleans Saints	March 23, 2020	1 year, $910k
S	D. J. Swearinger	New Orleans Saints	March 22, 2020	1 year, $1.1 million
MLB	Manti Te'o	Chicago Bears (PS)	October 20, 2020	1 year, $132k
RB	Dwayne Washington	New Orleans Saints	April 16, 2020	1 year, $1.0475 million
CB	P. J. Williams	New Orleans Saints	April 2, 2020	1 year, $2 million

==== Restricted ====
Position	Player	2020 team	Date signed	Contract
WR	Austin Carr	New Orleans Saints	May 7, 2020	1 year, $825k
CB	Justin Hardee	New Orleans Saints	March 20, 2020	1 year, $1.5 million
QB	Taysom Hill	New Orleans Saints	March 16, 2020	Assigned 1st Round Tender, 1 year, $4.641 million
C	Cameron Tom	New Orleans Saints	April 9, 2020	1 year, $887.5k

==== Exclusive Rights FA ====
Position	Player	2020 team	Date signed	Contract
LB	Colton Jumper			
WR	Keith Kirkwood	Carolina Panthers	March 19, 2020	1 year, $800k

=== Signings ===
Position	Player	2019 team	Date signed	Contract
S	Malcolm Jenkins	Philadelphia Eagles	March 18, 2020	4 years, $32 million
FB	Michael Burton	Washington Redskins	March 18, 2020	1 year, $1.0475 million
WR	Emmanuel Sanders	San Francisco 49ers	March 20, 2020	2 years, $16 million
DB	Deatrick Nichols	Houston Roughnecks (XFL)	March 23, 2020	1 year, $675k
QB	Jameis Winston	Tampa Bay Buccaneers	April 28, 2020	1 year, $1.1 million
DT	Margus Hunt	Indianapolis Colts	April 30, 2020	1 year, $1.05 million
RB	Ty Montgomery	New York Jets	May 15, 2020	1 year, $1.0475 million
OLB	Anthony Chickillo	Pittsburgh Steelers	May 21, 2020	1 year, $1.0475 million
T	James Hurst	Baltimore Ravens	May 27, 2020	1 year, $1.0475 million
OLB	Nigel Bradham	Philadelphia Eagles	July 30, 2020	1 year, TBC
WR	Bennie Fowler	New York Giants	July 30, 2020	1 year, $910k
TE	Ethan Wolf	Los Angeles Rams	August 19, 2020	1 year, $610k
CB	Kemon Hall	Minnesota Vikings	August 25, 2020	1 year, $610k
LB	Wynton McManis	Calgary Stampeders (CFL)	August 28, 2020	1 year, $610k
DE	Anthony Lanier	Kansas City Chiefs	August 29, 2020	1 year, $825k
DE	T. J. Carter	Arizona Cardinals	August 29, 2020	1 year, $610k
CB	Ken Crawley	Practice Squad	October 12, 2020	1 year, $910k
WR	Tommylee Lewis	Practice Squad	October 31, 2020	1 year, $910k
QB	Trevor Siemian	Tennessee Titans	November 21, 2020	1 year, $910k
G	Patrick Omameh	Las Vegas Raiders	December 15, 2020	1 year, $1.05 million
WR	Jake Kumerow	Buffalo Bills	December 25, 2020	1 year, $750k

=== Practice squad additions ===
Position	Player	Last team	Date signed	Contract
DE	Anthony Zettel	Minnesota Vikings	September 19, 2020	1 year, $192k
CB	Grant Haley	New York Giants	September 20, 2020	1 year, $134.4k
CB	Ken Crawley	Arizona Cardinals	September 28, 2020	1 year, $168k
WR	Malik Henry	Indianapolis Colts	September 30, 2020	1 year, $117.6k
WR	Tommylee Lewis	Carolina Panthers	October 8, 2020	1 year, $156k
DE	Will Clarke	Detroit Lions	October 22, 2020	1 year, $132k
DT	Christian Ringo	Cincinnati Bengals	November 11, 2020	1 year, $96k
DT	Ryan Glasgow	New England Patriots	November 17, 2020	1 year, $84k
WR	Jake Lampman	Tampa Bay Vipers (XFL)	December 23, 2020	1 year, $16.8k
LS	John Denney	Miami Dolphins	January 11, 2021	1 year, TBC
K	Blair Walsh	Atlanta Falcons	January 11, 2021	1 year, TBC

=== Released/waived ===
Position	Player	2020 team	Date released
G	Larry Warford	N/A (Opt-out)	May 8, 2020
TE	Mitchell Loewen		May 15, 2020
WR	Tim White		May 28, 2020
DE	Gus Cumberlander		August 2, 2020
WR	Maurice Harris		August 2, 2020
WR	Krishawn Hogan	Tennessee Titans	August 2, 2020
S	Chris Johnson		August 2, 2020
WR	Tommylee Lewis	Carolina Panthers	August 2, 2020
G	Adrian Magee		August 2, 2020
RB	Taquan Mizzell	New York Giants (PS)	August 2, 2020
CB	Deatrick Nichols	Miami Dolphins	August 2, 2020
FB	Ricky Ortiz		August 2, 2020
DT	Taylor Stallworth	Indianapolis Colts	August 3, 2020
OLB	Nigel Bradham	Denver Broncos (PS)	August 24, 2020
CB	Tino Ellis	Miami Dolphins (PS)	August 26, 2020
OL	Darrin Paulo	Denver Broncos	August 29, 2020
LB	Joe Bachie	Philadelphia Eagles	September 5, 2020
WR	Emmanuel Butler		September 5, 2020
WR	Austin Carr	Resigned	September 5, 2020
DE	T. J. Carter		September 5, 2020
OLB	Anthony Chickillo	Denver Broncos	September 5, 2020
OLB	Andrew Dowell	Practice Squad	September 5, 2020
DT	Mario Edwards Jr.	Chicago Bears	September 5, 2020
WR	Bennie Fowler	Resigned	September 5, 2020
TE	Garrett Griffin	Resigned	September 5, 2020
CB	Kemon Hall	Practice Squad	September 5, 2020
WR	Lil'Jordan Humphrey	Practice Squad	September 5, 2020
DT	Margus Hunt	Resigned	September 5, 2020
WR	Juwan Johnson	Resigned	September 5, 2020
RB	Tony Jones	Practice Squad	September 5, 2020
LB	Wynton McManis		September 5, 2020
G	Patrick Omameh	Las Vegas Raiders	September 5, 2020
OL	Jordan Steckler	New England Patriots (PS)	September 5, 2020
TE	Tommy Stevens	Practice Squad	September 5, 2020
OL	Calvin Throckmorton	Practice Squad	September 5, 2020
C	Cameron Tom	Practice Squad	September 5, 2020
CB	Keith Washington	Practice Squad	September 5, 2020
TE	Ethan Wolf	Practice Squad	September 5, 2020
DE	Anthony Lanier		September 11, 2020
FS	Saquan Hampton	New York Jets	September 14, 2020
C	Will Clapp	Resigned	September 26, 2020
C	Will Clapp	Resigned	October 8, 2020
DT	Margus Hunt	Cincinnati Bengals	October 12, 2020
WR	Tommylee Lewis	Resigned	November 3, 2020
OLB	Chase Hansen	Practice Squad	November 24, 2020
TE	Garrett Griffin	Practice Squad	December 19, 2020
QB	Trevor Siemian	Practice Squad	December 19, 2020
WR	Tommylee Lewis	Practice Squad	December 24, 2020
G	Patrick Omameh	Kansas City Chiefs (PS)	December 24, 2020
WR	Jake Kumerow	Practice Squad	January 9, 2021
WR	Austin Carr	Practice Squad	January 11, 2021

=== Practice squad releases ===
Position	Player	2020 team	Date released
CB	Kemon Hall	Dallas Cowboys (PS)	September 19, 2020
WR	Malik Henry		October 10, 2020
TE	Tommy Stevens	Carolina Panthers	November 10, 2020
DE	Will Clarke		November 17, 2020
DT	Christian Ringo		January 11, 2021
DE	Anthony Zettel	Practice Squad	January 11, 2021
LS	John Denney	Practice Squad	January 13, 2021
WR	Jake Lampman		January 13, 2021
K	Blair Walsh	Practice Squad	January 13, 2021
WR	Tommylee Lewis		January 16, 2021
DE	Anthony Zettel		January 16, 2021

=== Contract extensions ===
Position	Player	Date signed	Contract
DT	David Onyemata	March 16, 2020	3 years, $27 million
LS	Zach Wood	March 16, 2020	4 years, $4.78 million
CB	Janoris Jenkins	March 25, 2020	2 years, $16.75 million
QB	Taysom Hill	April 26, 2020	2 years, $20.941 million

=== Retirements ===
Position	Player	Date retired
FB	Zach Line	January 15, 2020

=== Player trades ===
Position	Player	From/to	Date traded	For
LB	Kwon Alexander	San Francisco 49ers	November 2, 2020	Kiko Alonso, 2021 Conditional Fifth-round selection to 49ers
LB	Kiko Alonso	San Francisco 49ers	November 2, 2020	Kwon Alexander, 2021 Conditional Fifth-round selection to 49ers

== Draft ==
2020 New Orleans Saints Draft
Round	Selection	Player	Position	College
1	24	Cesar Ruiz	C	Michigan
3	74	Zack Baun	LB	Wisconsin
3	105	Adam Trautman	TE	Dayton
7	240	Tommy Stevens	QB	Mississippi State

Notes

- The Saints traded their second-round selection (No. 56 overall) to the Miami Dolphins in exchange for the Dolphins' 2019 second-round selection.
- The Saints traded their seventh-round selection, along with their 2019 fourth-round selection to the New York Giants in exchange for cornerback Eli Apple.
- The Saints traded their third-round selection (No. 88 overall) and their 2021 third-round selection to the Cleveland Browns in exchange for the Browns' 2020 third-round selection (No. 74 overall) and the Browns' seventh-round selection (No. 244 overall).
- The Saints traded their fourth-round selection (No. 130 overall), fifth-round selection (No. 169 overall), sixth-round selection (No. 203 overall) and their seventh-round selection (No. 244 overall) to the Minnesota Vikings in exchange for the Vikings' 2020 third-round selection (No. 105 overall).
- The Saints traded their 2021 sixth-round selection to the Houston Texans in exchange for the Texans' 2020 seventh-round selection (No. 240 overall).

=== Undrafted free agent signings ===
Position	Player	College	Date signed	Contract
LB	Joe Bachie	Michigan State	April 25, 2020	3 years, $2.285 million
WR	Marquez Callaway	Tennessee	April 25, 2020	3 years, $2.295 million
DE	Gus Cumberlander	Oregon	April 25, 2020	3 years, $2.2865 million
CB	Tino Ellis	Maryland	April 25, 2020	3 years, $2.285 million
P	Blake Gillikin	Penn State	April 25, 2020	3 years, $2.285 million
WR	Juwan Johnson	Oregon	April 25, 2020	3 years, $2.295 million
RB	Tony Jones	Notre Dame	April 25, 2020	3 years, $2.285 million
OL	Darrin Paulo	Utah	April 25, 2020	3 years, $2.285 million
DT	Malcolm Roach	Texas	April 25, 2020	3 years, $2.295 million
OL	Jordan Steckler	Northern Illinois	April 25, 2020	3 years, $2.3 million
OT	Calvin Throckmorton	Oregon	April 25, 2020	3 years, $2.2975 million
CB	Keith Washington	West Virginia	April 25, 2020	3 years, $2.285 million
G	Adrian Magee	LSU	April 26, 2020	3 years, $2.285 million

== Staff ==
2020 New Orleans Saints staff
Front office: Owner – Gayle Benson; President – Dennis Lauscha; Executive vice president/general manager – Mickey Loomis; Senior vice president/chief operating officer – Ben Hales; Asst. general manager/college scouting director – Jeff Ireland; Vice president of football administration – Khai Harley; Director of operations – James Nagaoka; Director of pro scouting – Terry Fontenot; Head coaches: Head coach – Sean Payton; Assistant head coach/tight ends – Dan Campbell; Offensive coaches: Offensive coordinator – Pete Carmichael; Quarterbacks – Joe Lombardi; Running backs – Joel Thomas; Wide receivers – Ronald Curry; Offensive line – Dan Roushar; Assistant offensive line – Brendan Nugent; Senior offensive assistant – Curtis Johnson; Offensive assistant – Declan Doyle; Assistant to the head coach/offensive assistant – Kevin Petry; Offensive assistant – D. J. Williams	Defensive coaches: Defensive coordinator – Dennis Allen; Defensive line – Ryan Nielsen; Linebackers – Michael Hodges; Secondary – Aaron Glenn; Senior defensive assistant – Peter Giunta; Defensive assistant – Cory Robinson; Defensive assistant – Michael Wilhoite; Pass rush specialist – Brian Young; Special teams coaches: Special teams coordinator – Darren Rizzi; Assistant special teams – Phil Galiano; Strength and conditioning: Head strength and conditioning – Dan Dalrymple; Assistant strength and conditioning – Charles Byrd; Assistant strength and conditioning – Rob Wenning

== Final roster ==
2020 New Orleans Saints roster
Quarterbacks (QB): 9 Drew Brees; 7 Taysom Hill; 2 Jameis Winston; Running backs (RB): 32 Michael Burton FB; 41 Alvin Kamara; 88 Ty Montgomery; 28 Latavius Murray; 24 Dwayne Washington; Wide receivers (WR): 12 Marquez Callaway; 11 Deonte Harris RS; 83 Juwan Johnson; 17 Emmanuel Sanders; 10 Tre'Quan Smith; 13 Michael Thomas; Tight ends (TE): 87 Jared Cook; 89 Josh Hill; 82 Adam Trautman	Offensive linemen (OL): 72 Terron Armstead T; 73 Ethan Greenidge T; 74 James Hurst T; 68 Derrick Kelly II G; 78 Erik McCoy C; 75 Andrus Peat G; 71 Ryan Ramczyk T; 51 Cesar Ruiz G; Defensive linemen (DL): 90 Malcom Brown DT; 92 Marcus Davenport DE; 96 Carl Granderson DE; 91 Trey Hendrickson DE; 94 Cameron Jordan DE; 93 David Onyemata DT; 98 Sheldon Rankins DT; 97 Malcolm Roach DT; 99 Shy Tuttle DT	Linebackers (LB): 47 Alex Anzalone MLB; 53 Zack Baun OLB; 56 Demario Davis OLB; 55 Kaden Elliss OLB; 52 Craig Robertson MLB; Defensive backs (DB): 25 Ken Crawley CB; 22 C. J. Gardner-Johnson SS; 48 J. T. Gray SS; 34 Justin Hardee CB; 20 Janoris Jenkins CB; 27 Malcolm Jenkins SS; 23 Marshon Lattimore CB; 21 Patrick Robinson CB; 36 D. J. Swearinger FS; 43 Marcus Williams FS; 26 P. J. Williams FS; Special teams (ST): 3 Wil Lutz K; 6 Thomas Morstead P; 49 Zach Wood LS	Practice squad: 80 Austin Carr WR; 46 John Denney LS; 50 Andrew Dowell LB; 95 Ryan Glasgow DT; 45 Garrett Griffin TE; 30 Grant Haley CB; 42 Chase Hansen OLB; 84 Lil'Jordan Humphrey WR; 37 Tony Jones Jr. RB; 18 Jake Kumerow WR; 15 Trevor Siemian QB; 66 Calvin Throckmorton T; 63 Cameron Tom G; 5 Blair Walsh K; 38 Keith Washington Jr. CB; 59 Marcus Willoughby DE (PS/I); 86 Ethan Wolf TE; Reserve: 58 Kwon Alexander MLB (IR); 29 Johnson Bademosi CB (IR); 64 Will Clapp C (COVID-19); 77 Jalen Dalton DT (IR); 62 Nick Easton G (IR); 16 Bennie Fowler WR (IR); 4 Blake Gillikin P (IR); 57 Noah Spence DE (NF-Inj.); 86 Jason Vander Laan TE (Opt-out); 85 Cole Wick TE (Opt-out); Rookies in italics 53 active, 10 reserve, 16 practice squad (1 exempt)

== Preseason ==
The Saints' preseason schedule was announced on May 7, but was later cancelled due to the COVID-19 pandemic.

Week	Date	Opponent	Venue	Result
1	August 14	at Los Angeles Rams	SoFi Stadium	Cancelled due to the COVID-19 pandemic
2	August 23	at Pittsburgh Steelers	Heinz Field	Cancelled due to the COVID-19 pandemic
3	August 29	Houston Texans	Mercedes-Benz Superdome	Cancelled due to the COVID-19 pandemic
4	September 3	Miami Dolphins	Mercedes-Benz Superdome	Cancelled due to the COVID-19 pandemic

== Regular season ==
=== Schedule ===
The Saints' 2020 schedule was announced on May 7.

Week	Date	Opponent	Result	Record	Venue	Recap
1	September 13	**Tampa Bay Buccaneers**	**W** 34–23	1–0	Mercedes-Benz Superdome	Recap
2	September 21	at Las Vegas Raiders	**L** 24–34	1–1	Allegiant Stadium	Recap
3	September 27	Green Bay Packers	**L** 30–37	1–2	Mercedes-Benz Superdome	Recap
4	October 4	at Detroit Lions	**W** 35–29	2–2	Ford Field	Recap
5	October 12	Los Angeles Chargers	**W** 30–27 (OT)	3–2	Mercedes-Benz Superdome	Recap
6	Bye					
7	October 25	**Carolina Panthers**	**W** 27–24	4–2	Mercedes-Benz Superdome	Recap
8	November 1	at Chicago Bears	**W** 26–23 (OT)	5–2	Soldier Field	Recap
9	November 8	at **Tampa Bay Buccaneers**	**W** 38–3	6–2	Raymond James Stadium	Recap
10	November 15	San Francisco 49ers	**W** 27–13	7–2	Mercedes-Benz Superdome	Recap
11	November 22	**Atlanta Falcons**	**W** 24–9	8–2	Mercedes-Benz Superdome	Recap
12	November 29	at Denver Broncos	**W** 31–3	9–2	Empower Field at Mile High	Recap
13	December 6	at **Atlanta Falcons**	**W** 21–16	10–2	Mercedes-Benz Stadium	Recap
14	December 13	at Philadelphia Eagles	**L** 21–24	10–3	Lincoln Financial Field	Recap
15	December 20	Kansas City Chiefs	**L** 29–32	10–4	Mercedes-Benz Superdome	Recap
16	December 25	Minnesota Vikings	**W** 52–33	11–4	Mercedes-Benz Superdome	Recap
17	January 3	at **Carolina Panthers**	**W** 33–7	12–4	Bank of America Stadium	Recap

Note: Intra-division opponents are in bold text.

=== Game summaries ===
==== Week 1: vs. Tampa Bay Buccaneers ====
Week One: Tampa Bay Buccaneers at New Orleans Saints – Game summary

Quarter	1	2	3	4	Total
Buccaneers	7	0	10	6	**23**
**Saints**	0	17	7	10	**34**

at Mercedes-Benz Superdome, New Orleans, Louisiana

- Date: September 13
- Game time: 3:25 p.m. CDT
- Game weather: None (indoor stadium)
- Game attendance: 0
- Referee: Jerome Boger
- TV announcers (Fox): Joe Buck, Troy Aikman and Erin Andrews
- Recap, Game Book

Game information

**First quarter**

- TB – Tom Brady 2-yard run (Ryan Succop kick), 7:27. Buccaneers 7–0. **Drive: 9 plays, 85 yards, 4:53.**

**Second quarter**

- NO – Alvin Kamara 12-yard pass from Drew Brees (Wil Lutz kick), 11:39. Tied 7–7. **Drive: 11 plays, 64 yards, 5:38.**
- NO – Alvin Kamara 6-yard run (Wil Lutz kick), 10:09. Saints 14–7. **Drive: 3 plays, 35 yards, 0:47.**
- NO – Wil Lutz 29-yard field goal, 0:44,. Saints 17–7. **Drive: 10 plays, 44 yards, 2:53.**

**Third quarter**

- NO – Janoris Jenkins 36-yard interception return (Wil Lutz kick), 13:13. Saints 24–7.
- TB – O. J. Howard 9-yards pass from Tom Brady (Ryan Succop kick), 12:20. Saints 24–14. **Drive: 2 plays, 75 yards, 0:53.**
- TB – Ryan Succop 38-yards field goal, 2:22. Saints 24–17. **Drive: 8 plays, 69 yards, 3:54.**

**Fourth quarter**

- NO – Emmanuel Sanders 5-yards pass from Drew Brees (Wil Lutz kick), 11:38. Saints 31–17. **Drive: 6 plays, 61 yards, 2:25.**
- NO – Wil Lutz 21-yards field goal, 8:01. Saints 34–17. **Drive: 7 plays, 15 yards, 3:37.**
- TB – Mike Evans 2-yards pass from Tom Brady (kick failed), 2:41. Saints 34–23. **Drive: 11 plays, 90 yards, 3:18.**

**Top passers**

- TB – Tom Brady – 23/36, 239 yards, 2 TD, 2 INT
- NO – Drew Brees – 18/30, 160 yards, 2 TD

**Top rushers**

- TB – Ronald Jones – 17 rushes, 66 yards
- NO – Latavius Murray – 15 rushes, 48 yards

**Top receivers**

- TB – Chris Godwin – 6 receptions, 79 yards
- NO – Jared Cook – 5 receptions, 80 yards

With the win, the Saints began the year at 1–0 for the second year in a row.

==== Week 2: at Las Vegas Raiders ====
Week Two: New Orleans Saints at Las Vegas Raiders – Game summary

Quarter	1	2	3	4	Total
Saints	10	7	0	7	**24**
**Raiders**	0	17	7	10	**34**

at Allegiant Stadium, Paradise, Nevada

- Date: September 21
- Game time: 7:15 p.m. CDT/5:15 p.m. PDT
- Game weather: None (indoor stadium)
- Game attendance: 0
- Referee: Shawn Hochuli
- TV announcers (ESPN/ABC + ESPN2): Steve Levy, Brian Griese, Louis Riddick, Lisa Salters and John Parry; Rece Davis and Kirk Herbstreit (ESPN2 Megacast)
- Recap, Game Book

Game information

**First quarter**

- NO – Wil Lutz 31-yard field goal, 11:01. Saints 3–0. **Drive: 11 plays, 62 yards, 3:59.**
- NO – Alvin Kamara 1-yard run (Will Litz kick), 3:51. Saints 10–0. **Drive: 9 plays, 78 yards, 4:07.**

**Second quarter**

- LV – Alec Ingold 3-yard pass from Derek Carr (Daniel Carlson kick), 8:55. Saints 10–7. **Drive: 11 plays, 63 yards, 6:18.**
- NO – Jared Cook 6-yard pass from Drew Brees (Wil Lutz kick), 5:22. Saints 17–7. **Drive: 7 plays, 76 yards, 3:33.**
- LV – Zay Jones 15-yard pass from Derek Carr (Daniel Carlson kick), 1:44. Saints 17–14. **Drive: 10 plays, 75 yards, 3:38.**
- LV – Daniel Carlson 38-yard field goal, 0:09. Tied 17–17. **Drive: 8 plays, 31 yards, 0:39.**

**Third quarter**

- LV – Darren Waller 1-yard pass from Derek Carr (Daniel Carlson kick), 9:58. Raiders 24–17. **Drive: 9 plays, 75 yards, 5:02.**

**Fourth quarter**

- LV – Jalen Richard 20-yard run (Daniel Carlson kick), 7:43. Raiders 31–17. **Drive: 10 plays, 89 yards, 4:34.**
- NO – Alvin Kamara 3-yard run (Will Litz kick), 4:33. Raiders 31–24. **Drive: 8 plays, 67 yards, 3:10.**
- LV – Daniel Carlson 54-yard field goal, 1:08. Raiders 34–24. **Drive: 7 plays, 46 yards, 3:26.**

**Top passers**

- NO – Drew Brees – 26/38, 312 yards, TD, INT
- LV – Derek Carr – 28/38, 282 yards, 3 TD

**Top rushers**

- NO – Alvin Kamara – 13 rushes, 79 yards, 2 TD
- LV – Josh Jacobs – 27 rushes, 88 yards

**Top receivers**

- NO – Alvin Kamara – 9 receptions, 95 yards
- LV – Darren Waller – 12 receptions, 103 yards, TD

This was the first NFL game in Las Vegas or in the state of Nevada. With the loss, the Saints dropped to 1–1 on the season.

==== Week 3: vs. Green Bay Packers ====
Week Three: Green Bay Packers at New Orleans Saints – Game summary

Quarter	1	2	3	4	Total
**Packers**	3	10	14	10	**37**
Saints	7	10	10	3	**30**

at Mercedes-Benz Superdome, New Orleans, Louisiana

- Date: September 27
- Game time: 7:20 p.m. CDT
- Game weather: None (indoor stadium)
- Game attendance: 0
- Referee: Brad Rogers
- TV announcers (NBC): Mike Tirico, Cris Collinsworth, Michele Tafoya, and Terry McAulay
- Recap, Game Book

Game information

**First quarter**

- GB – Mason Crosby 52-yard field goal, 7:30. Packers 3–0. **Drive: 10 plays, 35 yards, 5:38.**
- NO – Alvin Kamara 11-yard pass from Drew Brees (Wil Lutz kick), 7:30. Saints 7–3. **Drive: 4 plays, 77 yards, 2:23.**

**Second quarter**

- GB – Mason Crosby 33-yard field goal, 14:12. Saints 7–6. **Drive: 12 plays, 60 yards, 5:55.**
- GB – Allen Lazard 5-yard pass from Aaron Rodgers (Mason Crosby kick), 10:32. Packers 13–7. **Drive: 3 plays, 50 yards, 1:27.**
- NO – Wil Lutz 45-yard field goal, 4:28. Packers 13–10. **Drive: 11 plays, 49 yards, 6:04.**
- NO – Emmanuel Sanders 10-yard pass from Drew Brees (Wil Lutz kick), 0:06. Saints 17–13. **Drive: 11 plays, 61 yards, 2:34.**

**Third quarter**

- GB – Aaron Jones 1-yard run (Mason Crosby kick), 12:58. Packers 20–17. **Drive: 7 plays, 75 yards, 2:02.**
- NO – Wil Lutz 35-yard field goal, 5:55. Tied 20–20. **Drive: 12 plays, 58 yards, 7:03.**
- GB – Marcedes Lewis 18-yard pass from Aaron Rodgers (Mason Crosby kick), 10:32. Packers 27–20. **Drive: 6 plays, 75 yards, 3:38.**
- NO – Alvin Kamara 52-yard pass from Drew Brees (Wil Lutz kick), 0:33. Tied 27–27. **Drive: 3 plays, 75 yards, 1:44.**

**Fourth quarter**

- GB – Mason Crosby 47-yard field goal, 8:47. Packers 30–27. **Drive: 7 plays, 26 yards, 3:32.**
- GB – Robert Tonyan 1-yard pass from Aaron Rodgers (Mason Crosby kick), 2:00. Packers 37–27. **Drive: 7 plays, 64 yards, 4:36.**
- NO – Wil Lutz 34-yard field goal, 0:32. Packers 37–30. **Drive: 9 plays, 59 yards, 1:28.**

**Top passers**

- GB – Aaron Rodgers – 21/32, 283 yards, 3 TD
- NO – Drew Brees – 29/36, 288 yards, 3 TD

**Top rushers**

- GB – Aaron Jones – 16 rushes, 69 yards, TD
- NO – Latavius Murray – 12 rushes, 58 yards

**Top receivers**

- GB – Allen Lazard – 6 receptions, 146 yards, TD
- NO – Alvin Kamara – 13 receptions, 139 yards, 2 TD

With the tough loss, the Saints dropped to 1–2 for the first time since 2017. This also marks their first loss to the Packers since the 2012 season.

==== Week 4: at Detroit Lions ====
Week Four: New Orleans Saints at Detroit Lions – Game summary

Quarter	1	2	3	4	Total
**Saints**	7	21	7	0	**35**
Lions	14	0	7	8	**29**

at Ford Field, Detroit, Michigan

- Date: October 4
- Game time: 1:00 p.m. EDT/12:00 p.m. CDT
- Game weather: None (indoor stadium)
- Game attendance: 0
- Referee: Shawn Smith
- TV announcers (Fox): Kenny Albert, Jonathan Vilma and Shannon Spake
- Recap, Game Book

Game information

**First quarter**

- DET – D'Andre Swift 7-yard pass from Matthew Stafford (Matt Prater kick), 11:58. Lions 7–0. **Drive: 8 plays, 77 yards, 3:02.**
- DET – Kenny Golladay 15-yard pass from Matthew Stafford (Matt Prater kick), 10:23. Lions 14–0. **Drive: 3 plays, 18 yards, 1:21.**
- NO – Latavius Murray 3-yard run (Wil Lutz kick), 3:08. Lions 14–7. **Drive: 13 plays, 75 yards, 7:15.**

**Second quarter**

- NO – Alvin Kamara 1-yard run (Wil Lutz kick), 10:10. Tied 14–14. **Drive: 10 plays, 80 yards, 5:42.**
- NO – Tre'Quan Smith 2-yard pass from Drew Brees (Wil Lutz kick), 3:03. Saints 21–14. **Drive: 9 plays, 80 yards, 5:26.**
- NO – Tre'Quan Smith 20-yard pass from Drew Brees (Wil Lutz kick), 0:44. Saints 28–14. **Drive: 4 plays, 49 yards, 0:59.**

**Third quarter**

- NO – Latavius Murray 6-yard run (Wil Lutz kick), 8:52. Saints 35–14. **Drive: 10 plays, 75 yards, 6:08.**
- DET – T. J. Hockenson 1-yard pass from Matthew Stafford (Matt Prater kick), 4:19. Saints 35–21. **Drive: 11 plays, 75 yards, 4:33.**

**Fourth quarter**

- DET – Adrian Peterson 5-yard run (Matthew Stafford–T. J. Hockenson pass), 3:40. Saints 35–29. **Drive: 12 plays, 43 yards, 4:21.**

**Top passers**

- NO – Drew Brees – 19/25, 246 yards, 2 TD, INT
- DET – Matthew Stafford – 17/31, 206 yards, 3 TD, INT

**Top rushers**

- NO – Alvin Kamara – 19 rushes, 83 yards, TD
- DET – Adrian Peterson – 11 rushes, 36 yards, TD

**Top receivers**

- NO – Emmanuel Sanders – 6 receptions, 93 yards
- DET – Kenny Golladay – 4 receptions, 62 yards, TD

With this win against Detroit, the Saints improve to 2–2.

==== Week 5: vs. Los Angeles Chargers ====
Week Five: Los Angeles Chargers at New Orleans Saints – Game summary

Quarter	1	2	3	4	OT	Total
Chargers	6	14	0	7	0	**27**
**Saints**	3	7	3	14	3	**30**

at Mercedes-Benz Superdome, New Orleans, Louisiana

- Date: October 12
- Game time: 7:15 p.m. CDT
- Game weather: None (indoor stadium)
- Game attendance: 749
- Referee: Clay Martin
- TV announcers (ESPN): Steve Levy, Brian Griese, Louis Riddick, Lisa Salters and John Parry
- Recap, Game Book

Game information

**First quarter**

- LAC – Keenan Allen 17-yard pass from Justin Herbert (kick failed), 6:26. Chargers 6–0. **Drive: 9 plays, 80 yards, 4:33.**
- NO – Wil Lutz 48-yard field goal, 0:00. Chargers 6–3. **Drive: 5 plays, 18 yards, 2:41.**

**Second quarter**

- LAC – Mike Williams 4-yard pass from Justin Herbert (Michael Badgley kick), 11:01. Chargers 13–3. **Drive: 7 plays, 75 yards, 3:59.**
- LAC – Hunter Henry 4-yard pass from Justin Herbert (Michael Badgley kick), 4:25. Chargers 20–3. **Drive: 3 plays, 1 yard, 1:23.**
- NO – Drew Brees 1-yard run (Wil Lutz kick), 0:14. Chargers 20–10. **Drive: 8 plays, 51 yards, 1:45.**

**Third quarter**

- NO – Wil Lutz 53-yard field goal, 4:52. Chargers 20–13. **Drive: 7 plays, 40 yards, 3:25.**

**Fourth quarter**

- NO – Jared Cook 41-yard pass from Drew Brees (Wil Lutz kick), 11:21. Tied 20–20. **Drive: 10 plays, 89 yards, 5:02.**
- LAC – Mike Williams 64-yard pass from Justin Herbert (Michael Badgley kick), 3:40. Chargers 27–20. **Drive: 4 plays, 78 yards, 2:02.**
- NO – Taysom Hill 9-yard run (Wil Lutz kick), 0:52. Tied 27–27. **Drive: 8 plays, 73 yards, 2:48.**

**Overtime**

- NO – Wil Lutz 36-yard field goal, 5:08. Saints 30–27. **Drive: 9 plays, 48 yards, 4:52.**

**Top passers**

- LAC – Justin Herbert – 20/34, 264 yards, 4 TD
- NO – Drew Brees – 33/47, 325 yards, TD, INT

**Top receivers**

- LAC – Justin Jackson – 15 rushes, 71 yards
- NO – Alvin Kamara – 11 rushes, 45 yards

**Top rushers**

- LAC – Mike Williams – 5 receptions, 109 yards, 2 TD
- NO – Emmanuel Sanders – 12 receptions, 122 yards

Drew Brees faced his former team for the fourth time in his career. A potential game-winning 50-yard field goal by Chargers kicker Michael Badgley hit the upright instead, sending the game into overtime. With 5:08 left in the overtime period, Wil Lutz kicked a 36-yard field goal to take a 30–27 lead. But the night belonged to Marshon Lattimore, who stopped Chargers wide receiver Mike Williams on fourth down to seal the victory for New Orleans. They won despite Michael Thomas being out for a fourth straight game. However, this time, it was due to suspension after an altercation with Chauncey Gardner-Johnson during practice.

==== Week 7: vs. Carolina Panthers ====
Week Seven: Carolina Panthers at New Orleans Saints – Game summary

Quarter	1	2	3	4	Total
Panthers	3	14	7	0	**24**
**Saints**	7	14	3	3	**27**

at Mercedes-Benz Superdome, New Orleans, Louisiana

- Date: October 25
- Game time: 12:00 p.m. CDT
- Game weather: None (indoor stadium)
- Game attendance: 3,000
- Referee: Craig Wrolstad
- TV announcers (Fox): Kevin Kugler, Chris Spielman and Laura Okmin
- Recap, Game Book

Game information

**First quarter**

- NO – Jared Cook 4-yard pass from Drew Brees (Wil Lutz kick), 6:34. Saints 7–0. **Drive: 14 plays, 75 yards, 8:26.**
- CAR – Joey Slye 43-yard field goal, 1:54. Saints 7–3. **Drive: 9 plays, 50 yards, 4:40.**

**Second quarter**

- NO – Drew Brees 1-yard run (Wil Lutz kick), 12:13. Saints 14–3. **Drive: 9 plays, 78 yards, 4:41.**
- CAR – D. J. Moore 74-yard pass from Teddy Bridgewater (Joey Slye kick), 10:56. Saints 14–10. **Drive: 2 plays, 75 yards, 1:17.**
- CAR – D. J. Moore 7-yard pass from Teddy Bridgewater (Joey Slye kick), 1:37. Panthers 17–14. **Drive: 9 plays, 65 yards, 5:21.**
- NO – Deonte Harris 4-yard pass from Drew Brees (Wil Lutz kick), 0:02. Saints 21–17. **Drive: 8 plays, 75 yards, 1:35.**

**Third quarter**

- NO – Wil Lutz 41-yard field goal, 4:24. Saints 24–17. **Drive: 13 plays, 58 yards, 6:53.**
- CAR – Curtis Samuel 5-yard run (Joey Slye kick), 0:08. Tied 24–24. **Drive: 8 plays, 75 yards, 4:16.**

**Fourth quarter**

- NO – Wil Lutz 43-yard field goal, 7:55. Saints 27–24. **Drive: 13 plays, 50 yards, 7:13.**

**Top passers**

- CAR – Teddy Bridgewater – 23/28, 254 yards, 2 TD
- NO – Drew Brees – 29/36, 287 yards, 2 TD

**Top rushers**

- CAR – Mike Davis – 7 rushes, 12 yards
- NO – Alvin Kamara – 14 rushes, 83 yards

**Top receivers**

- CAR – D. J. Moore – 4 receptions, 93 yards, 2 TD
- NO – Marquez Callaway – 8 receptions, 75 yards

The Saints meet the Panthers and Teddy Bridgewater in this game. Bridgewater accidentally fell into the Saints sideline, but he reunited with his old friend Drew Brees who did the quarterback sneak earlier. The Saints were still able to beat the Panthers by 3.

==== Week 8: at Chicago Bears ====
Week Eight: New Orleans Saints at Chicago Bears – Game summary

Quarter	1	2	3	4	OT	Total
**Saints**	3	7	6	7	3	**26**
Bears	3	10	0	10	0	**23**

at Soldier Field, Chicago, Illinois

- Date: November 1
- Game time: 3:25 p.m. CST
- Game weather: Partly cloudy, 40 °F (4 °C)
- Game attendance: 0
- Referee: Tony Corrente
- TV announcers (Fox): Joe Buck, Troy Aikman and Erin Andrews
- Recap, Game Book

Game information

**First quarter**

- NO – Wil Lutz 38-yard field goal, 8:13. Saints 3–0. **Drive: 12 plays, 55 yards, 6:47.**
- CHI – Cairo Santos 44-yard field goal, 1:13. Tied 3–3. **Drive: 14 plays, 49 yards, 7:00.**

**Second quarter**

- CHI – Allen Robinson 24-yard pass from Nick Foles (Cairo Santos kick), 8:10. Bears 10–3. **Drive: 4 plays, 80 yards, 2:28.**
- CHI – Cairo Santos 29-yard field goal, 1:39. Bears 13–3. **Drive: 7 plays, 50 yards, 2:13.**
- NO – Jared Cook 16-yard pass from Drew Brees (Wil Lutz kick), 0:03. Bears 13–10. **Drive: 9 plays, 68 yards, 1:36.**

**Third quarter**

- NO – Wil Lutz 27-yard field goal, 9:19. Tied 13–13. **Drive: 4 plays, 7 yards, 1:32.**
- NO – Wil Lutz 39-yard field goal, 5:04. Saints 16–13. **Drive: 8 plays, 19 yards, 3:30.**

**Fourth quarter**

- NO – Taysom Hill 20-yard pass from Drew Brees (Wil Lutz kick), 9:57. Saints 23–13. **Drive: 7 plays, 64 yards, 4:14.**
- CHI – Darnell Mooney 3-yard pass from Nick Foles (Cairo Santos kick), 3:32. Saints 23–20. **Drive: 11 plays, 75 yards, 6:25.**
- CHI – Cairo Santos 51-yard field goal, 0:13. Tied 23–23. **Drive: 12 plays, 35 yards, 1:38.**

**Overtime**

- NO – Wil Lutz 35-yard field goal, 1:36. Saints 26–23. **Drive: 7 plays, 52 yards, 2:12.**

**Top passers**

- NO – Drew Brees – 31/41, 280 yards, 2 TD
- CHI – Nick Foles – 28/41, 272 yards, 2 TD, INT

**Top rushers**

- NO – Alvin Kamara – 12 rushes, 67 yards
- CHI – David Montgomery – 21 rushes, 89 yards

**Top receivers**

- NO – Alvin Kamara – 9 receptions, 96 yards
- CHI – Allen Robinson – 6 receptions, 87 yards, TD

The Saints meet Chicago again in the regular season at Soldier Field. During the 3rd Quarter, a fight broke out between C.J. Gardner-Johnson and Javon Wims, resulting in flags on the play. This also resulted in Wims getting ejected from the game. Again, the Saints go into overtime and won with a 35-yard field goal, improving them to 5-2.

==== Week 9: at Tampa Bay Buccaneers ====
Week Nine: New Orleans Saints at Tampa Bay Buccaneers – Game summary

Quarter	1	2	3	4	Total
**Saints**	14	17	0	7	**38**
Buccaneers	0	0	0	3	**3**

at Raymond James Stadium, Tampa, Florida

- Date: November 8
- Game time: 8:20 p.m. EST/7:20 p.m. CST
- Game weather: Cloudy, 77 °F (25 °C)
- Game attendance: 15,740
- Referee: John Hussey
- TV announcers (NBC): Al Michaels, Cris Collinsworth, Michele Tafoya and Terry McAulay
- Recap, Game Book

Game information

**First quarter**

- NO – Tre'Quan Smith 14-yard pass from Drew Brees (Wil Lutz kick), 9:34. Saints 7–0. **Drive: 9 plays, 56 yards, 4:32.**
- NO – Adam Trautman 7-yard pass from Drew Brees (Wil Lutz kick), 0:00. Saints 14–0. **Drive: 5 plays, 35 yards, 2:38.**

**Second quarter**

- NO – Emmanuel Sanders 12-yard pass from Drew Brees (Wil Lutz kick), 11:44. Saints 21–0. **Drive: 5 plays, 50 yards, 2:23.**
- NO – Alvin Kamara 1-yard run (Wil Lutz kick), 8:45. Saints 28–0. **Drive: 5 plays, 27 yards, 2:12.**
- NO – Wil Lutz 36-yard field goal, 1:49. Saints 31–0. **Drive: 8 plays, 44 yards, 3:08.**

**Third quarter**

- No scoring plays.

**Fourth quarter**

- NO – Josh Hill 3-yard pass from Drew Brees (Wil Lutz kick), 9:07. Saints 38–0. **Drive: 10 plays, 70 yards, 6:50.**
- TB – Ryan Succop 48-yard field goal, 5:52. Saints 38–3. **Drive: 7 plays, 45 yards, 3:15.**

**Top passers**

- NO – Drew Brees – 26/32, 222 yards, 4 TD
- TB – Tom Brady – 22/38, 209 yards, 3 INT

**Top rushers**

- NO – Taysom Hill – 7 rushes, 54 yards
- TB – Ronald Jones II – 3 rushes, 9 yards

**Top receivers**

- NO – Michael Thomas – 5 receptions, 51 yards
- TB – Mike Evans – 4 receptions, 64 yards

The Saints visit Tom Brady and the Buccaneers at Raymond James Stadium. The Saints scored touchdowns and field goals. This includes those turnovers notched by David Onyemata and Marcus Williams. The Saints beat their rivals by 35 points, marking the second straight season to sweep them in the NFC South division.

==== Week 10: vs. San Francisco 49ers ====
Week Ten: San Francisco 49ers at New Orleans Saints – Game summary

Quarter	1	2	3	4	Total
49ers	7	3	0	3	**13**
**Saints**	0	17	0	10	**27**

at Mercedes-Benz Superdome, New Orleans, Louisiana

- Date: November 15
- Game time: 3:25 p.m. CST
- Game weather: None (indoor stadium)
- Game attendance: 5,979
- Referee: Brad Rogers
- TV announcers (Fox): Adam Amin, Mark Schlereth and Lindsay Czarniak
- Recap, Game Book

Game information

**First quarter**

- SF – Brandon Aiyuk 4-yard pass from Nick Mullens (Robbie Gould kick), 7:43. 49ers 7–0. **Drive: 13 plays, 75 yards, 7:17.**

**Second quarter**

- SF – Robbie Gould 32-yard field goal, 14:56. 49ers 10–0. **Drive: 8 plays, 35 yards, 4:44.**
- NO – Wil Lutz 49-yard field goal, 13:48. 49ers 10–3. **Drive: 4 plays, -6 yards, 1:08.**
- NO – Alvin Kamara 2-yard run (Wil Lutz kick), 6:48. Tied 10–10. **Drive: 4 plays, 21 yards, 2:33.**
- NO – Alvin Kamara 3-yard pass from Drew Brees (Wil Lutz kick), 1:15. Saints 17–10. **Drive: 6 plays, 57 yards, 0:35.**

**Third quarter**

- No scoring plays.

**Fourth quarter**

- NO – Wil Lutz 23-yard field goal, 12:15. Saints 20–10. **Drive: 12 plays, 59 yards, 6:06.**
- NO – Alvin Kamara 1-yard run (Wil Lutz kick), 7:29. Saints 27–10. **Drive: 3 plays, 22 yards, 1:30.**
- SF – Robbie Gould 40-yard field goal, 5:54. Saints 27–13. **Drive: 6 plays, 53 yards, 1:35.**

**Top passers**

- SF – Nick Mullens – 24/38, 247 yards, TD, 2 INT
- NO – Drew Brees – 8/13, 76 yards, TD

**Top rushers**

- SF – Jerick McKinnon – 18 rushes, 33 yards
- NO – Latavius Murray – 9 rushes, 57 yards

**Top receivers**

- SF – Brandon Aiyuk – 7 receptions, 75 yards, TD
- NO – Alvin Kamara – 7 receptions, 83 yards, TD

Drew Brees suffered a collapsed lung and broken ribs. He would be out until Week 15 against the Chiefs. Despite Brees being injured and sidelined, the Saints held on with the win over the 49ers. It also marked their first victory over San Francisco since the 2016 season.

==== Week 11: vs. Atlanta Falcons ====
Week Eleven: Atlanta Falcons at New Orleans Saints – Game summary

Quarter	1	2	3	4	Total
Falcons	3	6	0	0	**9**
**Saints**	3	7	7	7	**24**

at Mercedes-Benz Superdome, New Orleans, Louisiana

- Date: November 22
- Game time: 12:00 p.m. CST
- Game weather: None (indoor stadium)
- Game attendance: 6,000
- Referee: Brad Allen
- TV announcers (Fox): Kevin Burkhardt, Daryl Johnston and Pam Oliver
- Recap, Game Book

Game information

**First quarter**

- ATL – Younghoe Koo 28-yard field goal, 11:21. Falcons 3–0. **Drive: 7 plays, 65 yards, 3:39.**
- NO – Wil Lutz 22-yard field goal, 2:47. Tied 3–3. **Drive: 9 plays, 66 yards, 4:30.**

**Second quarter**

- ATL – Younghoe Koo 51-yard field goal, 13:56. Falcons 6–3. **Drive: 10 plays, 42 yards, 3:51.**
- ATL – Younghoe Koo 52-yard field goal, 4:31. Falcons 9–3. **Drive: 8 plays, 36 yards, 2:54.**
- NO – Alvin Kamara 3-yard run (Wil Lutz kick), 1:46. Saints 10–9. **Drive: 7 plays, 80 yards, 2:45.**

**Third quarter**

- NO – Taysom Hill 2-yard run (Wil Lutz kick), 9:11. Saints 17–9. **Drive: 10 plays, 80 yards, 5:49.**

**Fourth quarter**

- NO – Taysom Hill 10-yard run (Wil Lutz kick), 12:41. Saints 24–9. **Drive: 6 plays, 53 yards, 4:00.**

**Top passers**

- ATL – Matt Ryan – 19/37, 232 yards, 2 INT
- NO – Taysom Hill – 18/23, 233 yards

**Top rushers**

- ATL – Todd Gurley – 8 rushes, 26 yards
- NO – Taysom Hill – 10 rushes, 51 yards, 2 TD

**Top receivers**

- ATL – Calvin Ridley – 5 receptions, 90 yards
- NO – Michael Thomas – 9 receptions, 104 yards

Taysom Hill made his first start with Drew Brees sidelined with a rib injury. The Saints would defeat the Falcons by 15 points.

==== Week 12: at Denver Broncos ====
Week Twelve: New Orleans Saints at Denver Broncos – Game summary

Quarter	1	2	3	4	Total
**Saints**	0	17	7	7	**31**
Broncos	0	0	3	0	**3**

at Empower Field at Mile High, Denver, Colorado

- Date: November 29
- Game time: 3:05 p.m. CST/2:05 p.m. MST
- Game weather: Clear, 38 °F (3 °C)
- Game attendance: 0
- Referee: Craig Wrolstad
- TV announcers (Fox): Adam Amin, Mark Schlereth and Lindsay Czarniak
- Recap, Game Book

Game information

**First quarter**

- No scoring plays.

**Second quarter**

- NO – Taysom Hill 1-yard run (Wil Lutz kick), 10:19. Saints 7–0. **Drive: 13 plays, 74 yards, 8:01.**
- NO – Taysom Hill 2-yard run (Wil Lutz kick), 1:03. Saints 14–0. **Drive: 5 plays, 13 yards, 1:19.**
- NO – Wil Lutz 40-yard field goal, 0:00. Saints 17–0. **Drive: 2 plays, 19 yards, 0:12.**

**Third quarter**

- DEN – Brandon McManus 58-yard field goal, 6:56. Saints 17–3. **Drive: 4 plays, 1 yard, 2:07.**
- NO – Latavius Murray 36-yard run (Wil Lutz kick), 2:14. Saints 24–3. **Drive: 8 plays, 82 yards, 4:42.**

**Fourth quarter**

- NO – Latavius Murray 8-yard run (Wil Lutz kick), 6:03. Saints 31–3. **Drive: 11 plays, 77 yards, 6:54.**

**Top passers**

- NO – Taysom Hill – 9/16, 78 yards, INT
- DEN – Kendall Hinton – 1/9, 13 yards, 2 INT

**Top rushers**

- NO – Latavius Murray – 19 rushes, 124 yards, 2 TD
- DEN – Royce Freeman – 8 rushes, 50 yards

**Top receivers**

- NO – Michael Thomas – 4 receptions, 50 yards
- DEN – Noah Fant – 1 reception, 13 yards

This was an easy win due to the fact Drew Lock, Brett Rypien and Blake Bortles were all ineligible to play following Jeff Driskel testing positive for COVID-19 less than 24 hours before the game, which meant the Broncos named practice squad wide receiver Kendall Hinton, who played QB at Wake Forest, as starting quarterback for the game. This was also the Saints' first victory over the Broncos since the 1994 season, which also marks their first road game win and Sean Payton's first win over Denver.

==== Week 13: at Atlanta Falcons ====
Week Thirteen: New Orleans Saints at Atlanta Falcons – Game summary

Quarter	1	2	3	4	Total
**Saints**	7	7	7	0	**21**
Falcons	3	6	0	7	**16**

at Mercedes-Benz Stadium, Atlanta, Georgia

- Date: December 6
- Game time: 1:00 p.m. EST/12:00 p.m. CST
- Game weather: None (retractable roof closed)
- Game attendance: 8,713
- Referee: Adrian Hill
- TV announcers (Fox): Kenny Albert, Jonathan Vilma and Shannon Spake
- Recap, Game Book

Game information

**First quarter**

- NO – Tre'Quan Smith 15-yard pass from Taysom Hill (Wil Lutz kick), 7:01. Saints 7–0. **Drive: 7 plays, 87 yards, 3:33.**
- ATL – Younghoe Koo 53-yard field goal, 3:55. Saints 7–3. **Drive: 7 plays, 40 yards, 3:06.**

**Second quarter**

- ATL – Younghoe Koo 30-yard field goal, 4:51. Saints 7–6. **Drive: 8 plays, 52 yards, 2:49.**
- NO – Jared Cook 11-yard pass from Taysom Hill (Wil Lutz kick), 1:45. Saints 14–6. **Drive: 7 plays, 75 yards, 3:06.**
- ATL – Younghoe Koo 28-yard field goal, 0:00. Saints 14–9. **Drive: 9 plays, 65 yards, 1:45.**

**Third quarter**

- NO – Alvin Kamara 11-yard run (Wil Lutz kick), 9:01. Saints 21–9. **Drive: 12 plays, 75 yards, 5:59.**

**Fourth quarter**

- ATL – Russell Gage 10-yard pass from Matt Ryan (Younghoe Koo kick), 7:43. Saints 21–16. **Drive: 8 plays, 85 yards, 3:26.**

**Top passers**

- NO – Taysom Hill – 27/37, 232 yards, 2 TD
- ATL – Matt Ryan – 19/39, 273 yards, TD

**Top rushers**

- NO – Alvin Kamara – 15 rushes, 88 yards, TD
- ATL – Ito Smith – 8 rushes, 36 yards

**Top receivers**

- NO – Michael Thomas – 9 receptions, 105 yards
- ATL – Calvin Ridley – 5 receptions, 108 yards

Taysom Hill threw his first NFL touchdown pass in the first quarter on a 15-yard pass to receiver Tre'Quan Smith. In the end, Matt Ryan tried to throw a game-winning Hail Mary, but the Saints defense stepped up and made the ball drop to the ground. This marked their first sweep against Atlanta since the 2018 season.

==== Week 14: at Philadelphia Eagles ====
Week Fourteen: New Orleans Saints at Philadelphia Eagles – Game summary

Quarter	1	2	3	4	Total
Saints	0	0	14	7	**21**
**Eagles**	0	17	0	7	**24**

at Lincoln Financial Field, Philadelphia, Pennsylvania

- Date: December 13
- Game time: 4:25 p.m. EST/3:25 p.m. CST
- Game weather: Clear, 57 °F (14 °C)
- Game attendance: 0
- Referee: Jerome Boger
- TV announcers (Fox): Kevin Burkhardt, Daryl Johnston and Pam Oliver
- Recap, Game Book

Game information

**First quarter**

- No scoring plays.

**Second quarter**

- PHI – Alshon Jeffery 15-yard pass from Jalen Hurts (Jake Elliott kick), 13:25. Eagles 7–0. **Drive: 7 plays, 65 yards, 2:33.**
- PHI – Jake Elliott 44-yard field goal, 6:05. Eagles 10–0. **Drive: 4 plays, 6 yards, 0:52.**
- PHI – Miles Sanders 82-yard run (Jake Elliott kick), 1:35. Eagles 17–0. **Drive: 4 plays, 96 yards, 0:38.**

**Third quarter**

- NO – Alvin Kamara 5-yard run (Wil Lutz kick), 7:55. Eagles 17–7. **Drive: 10 plays, 65 yards, 5:07.**
- NO – Emmanuel Sanders 37-yard pass from Taysom Hill (Wil Lutz kick), 1:40. Eagles 17-14. **Drive: 4 plays, 60 yards, 1:23.**

**Fourth quarter**

- PHI – Miles Sanders 1-yard run (Jake Elliott kick), 6:22. Eagles 24–14. **Drive: 6 plays, 53 yards, 3:27.**
- NO – Jared Cook 20-yard pass from Taysom Hill (Wil Lutz kick), 1:24. Eagles 24-21. **Drive: 3 plays, 51 yards, 0:18.**

**Top passers**

- NO – Taysom Hill – 28/38, 291 yards, 2 TD, INT
- PHI – Jalen Hurts – 17/30, 167 yards, TD

**Top rushers**

- NO – Alvin Kamara – 11 rushes, 50 yards, TD
- PHI – Miles Sanders – 14 rushes, 115 yards, 2 TD

**Top receivers**

- NO – Michael Thomas – 8 receptions, 84 yards
- PHI – Jalen Reagor – 2 receptions, 46 yards

The Saints nine-game winning streak came to a halt. This also became the first time since the 2015 season to be defeated by the Eagles.

==== Week 15: vs. Kansas City Chiefs ====
Week Fifteen: Kansas City Chiefs at New Orleans Saints – Game summary

Quarter	1	2	3	4	Total
**Chiefs**	7	7	7	11	**32**
Saints	0	9	6	14	**29**

at Mercedes-Benz Superdome, New Orleans, Louisiana

- Date: December 20
- Game time: 3:25 p.m. CST
- Game weather: None (indoor stadium)
- Game attendance: 3,000
- Referee: Scott Novak
- TV announcers (CBS): Jim Nantz, Tony Romo, Tracy Wolfson and Gene Steratore
- Recap, Game Book

Game information

**First quarter**

- KC – Tyreek Hill 5-yard pass from Patrick Mahomes (Harrison Butker kick), 6:18. Chiefs 7–0. **Drive: 7 plays, 36 yards, 3:15.**

**Second quarter**

- KC – Travis Kelce 1-yard pass from Patrick Mahomes (Harrison Butker kick), 14:58. Chiefs 14–0. **Drive: 11 plays, 80 yards, 5:01.**
- NO – Taysom Hill 1-yard run (Wil Lutz kick), 10:21. Chiefs 14–7. **Drive: 7 plays, 66 yards, 2:40.**
- NO – Demarcus Robinson fumble forced by Craig Robertson out of bounds in end zone for a Safety, 0:03. Chiefs 14–9.

**Third quarter**

- NO – Latavius Murray 24-yard pass from Drew Brees (pass failed), 13:16. Saints 15–14. **Drive: 4 plays, 75 yards, 1:44.**
- KC – Mecole Hardman 5-yard pass from Patrick Mahomes (Harrison Butker kick), 8:23. Chiefs 21–15. **Drive: 9 plays, 75 yards, 4:53.**

**Fourth quarter**

- KC – Le'Veon Bell 12-yard run (Patrick Mahomes-Travis Kelce pass), 13:44. Chiefs 29–15. **Drive: 10 plays, 59 yards, 4:44.**
- NO – Alvin Kamara 14-yard pass from Drew Brees (Wil Lutz kick), 9:43. Chiefs 29–22. **Drive: 3 plays, 25 yards, 1:13.**
- KC – Harrison Butker 22-yard field goal, 4:18. Chiefs 32–22. **Drive: 10 plays, 71 yards, 5:25.**
- NO – Lil'Jordan Humphrey 17-yard pass from Drew Brees (Wil Lutz kick), 2:06. Chiefs 32–29. **Drive: 8 plays, 75 yards, 2:12.**

**Top passers**

- KC – Patrick Mahomes – 26/47, 254 yards, 3 TD
- NO – Drew Brees – 15/34, 234 yards, 3 TD, INT

**Top rushers**

- KC – Clyde Edwards-Helaire – 14 rushes, 79 yards
- NO – Alvin Kamara – 11 rushes, 54 yards

**Top receivers**

- KC – Travis Kelce – 8 receptions, 68 yards, TD
- NO – Emmanuel Sanders – 4 receptions, 76 yards

With Brees making his return from injury, a late fourth-quarter rally was not enough as the Saints fell short to the defending Super Bowl champion Chiefs in Patrick Mahomes' first career game in New Orleans and the Mercedes-Benz Superdome. Cameron Jordan became the first Saints player since Brodrick Bunkley (2012), Steve Gleason (2004), and Kyle Turley (2001) to be ejected from a game.

==== Week 16: vs. Minnesota Vikings ====
Christmas Day games

Week Sixteen: Minnesota Vikings at New Orleans Saints – Game summary

Quarter	1	2	3	4	Total
Vikings	7	7	13	6	**33**
**Saints**	14	10	7	21	**52**

at Mercedes-Benz Superdome, New Orleans, Louisiana

- Date: December 25
- Game time: 3:30 p.m. CST
- Game weather: None (indoor stadium)
- Game attendance: 3,000
- Referee: Adrian Hill
- TV announcers (Fox/NFLN/Amazon Prime Video): Joe Buck, Troy Aikman, Erin Andrews, Kristina Pink and Mike Pereira
- Recap, Game Book

Game information

**First quarter**

- NO – Alvin Kamara 40-yard run (Wil Lutz kick), 12:11. Saints 7–0. **Drive: 6 plays, 75 yards, 2:49.**
- MIN – Dalvin Cook 15-yard run (Dan Bailey kick), 8:46. Tied 7–7. **Drive: 8 plays, 75 yards, 3:25.**
- NO – Alvin Kamara 1-yard run (Wil Lutz kick), 5:20. Saints 14–7. **Drive: 7 plays, 66 yards, 3:36.**

**Second quarter**

- NO – Wil Lutz 30-yard field goal, 14:12. Saints 17–7. **Drive: 10 plays, 84 yards, 4:36.**
- MIN – Mike Boone 4-yard run (Dan Bailey kick), 10:14. Saints 17–14. **Drive: 8 plays, 75 yards, 3:58.**
- NO – Alvin Kamara 5-yard run (Wil Lutz kick), 0:38. Saints 24–14. **Drive: 7 plays, 46 yards, 2:37.**

**Third quarter**

- MIN – Irv Smith Jr. 2-yard pass from Kirk Cousins (kick failed), 9:41. Saints 24–20. **Drive: 3 plays, 18 yards, 1:12.**
- NO – Alvin Kamara 6-yard run (Wil Lutz kick), 4:38. Saints 31–20. **Drive: 10 plays, 47 yards, 5:03.**
- MIN – Irv Smith Jr. 4-yard pass from Kirk Cousins (Dan Bailey kick), 0:22. Saints 31–27. **Drive: 9 plays, 75 yards, 4:16.**

**Fourth quarter**

- NO – Alvin Kamara 7-yard run (Wil Lutz kick), 12:01. Saints 38–27. **Drive: 7 plays, 67 yards, 3:21.**
- NO – Taysom Hill 1-yard run (Wil Lutz kick), 4:00. Saints 45–27. **Drive: 10 plays, 58 yards, 6:22.**
- MIN – Adam Thielen 1-yard pass from Kirk Cousins (pass failed), 2:10. Saints 45–33. **Drive: 9 plays, 75 yards, 1:50.**
- NO – Alvin Kamara 3-yard run (Wil Lutz kick), 1:50. Saints 52–33. **Drive: 3 plays, 48 yards, 0:20.**

**Top passers**

- MIN – Kirk Cousins – 27/41, 291 yards, 3 TD
- NO – Drew Brees – 19/26, 311 yards, 2 INT

**Top rushers**

- MIN – Dalvin Cook – 15 rushes, 73 yards, TD
- NO – Alvin Kamara – 22 rushes, 155 yards, 6 TD

**Top receivers**

- MIN – Adam Thielen – 8 receptions, 97 yards, TD
- NO – Emmanuel Sanders – 4 receptions, 83 yards

The Saints clinched their fourth consecutive division title as Alvin Kamara rushed for six touchdowns, tying a 91-year-old NFL record set by Hall of fame fullback Ernie Nevers of the Chicago Cardinals.

==== Week 17: at Carolina Panthers ====
Week Seventeen: New Orleans Saints at Carolina Panthers – Game summary

Quarter	1	2	3	4	Total
**Saints**	7	9	10	7	**33**
Panthers	7	0	0	0	**7**

at Bank of America Stadium, Charlotte, North Carolina

- Date: January 3, 2021
- Game time: 4:25 p.m. EST/3:25 p.m. CST
- Game weather: Cloudy, 57 °F (14 °C)
- Game attendance: 1,500
- Referee: John Hussey
- TV announcers (Fox): Adam Amin, Mark Schlereth and Lindsay Czarniak
- Recap, Game Book

Game information

**First quarter**

- NO – Jared Cook 18-yard pass from Drew Brees (Wil Lutz kick), 9:04. Saints 7–0. **Drive: 8 plays, 42 yards, 4:24.**
- CAR – Rodney Smith 1-yard run (Joey Slye kick), 1:40. Tied 7–7. **Drive: 7 plays, 64 yards, 4:10.**

**Second quarter**

- NO – Emmanuel Sanders 8-yard pass from Drew Brees (Wil Lutz kick failed), 8:12. Saints 13–7. **Drive: 5 plays, 54 yards, 2:25.**
- NO – Wil Lutz 33-yard field goal, 0:00. Saints 16–7. **Drive: 10 plays, 63 yards, 2:47.**

**Third quarter**

- NO – Wil Lutz 48-yard field goal, 11:49. Saints 19–7. **Drive: 8 plays, 46 yards, 3:11.**
- NO – Taysom Hill 3-yard run (Wil Lutz kick), 4:56. Saints 26–7. **Drive: 3 plays, 24 yards, 1:06.**

**Fourth quarter**

- NO – Austin Carr 11-yard pass from Drew Brees (Wil Lutz kick), 14:55. Saints 33–7. **Drive: 8 plays, 57 yards, 4:27.**

**Top passers**

- NO – Drew Brees – 22/32, 201 yards, 3 TD
- CAR – Teddy Bridgewater – 13/23, 176 yards, 2 INT

**Top rushers**

- NO – Ty Montgomery – 18 rushes, 105 yards
- CAR – Rodney Smith – 10 rushes, 40 yards, TD

**Top receivers**

- NO – Emmanuel Sanders – 9 receptions, 63 yards, TD
- CAR – Curtis Samuel – 7 receptions, 118 yards

The Saints, not only beat the Panthers again, but they also became the first team in the NFC South to sweep their division rivals.

Clay Martin was originally going to officiate this game, but he was hospitalized for COVID-19. Adrian Hill was also unable to officiate this game because he had another game to be in. John Hussey became the referee for this game.

=== Standings ===
==== Division ====
NFC South
	W	L	T	PCT	DIV	CONF	PF	PA	STK
^{(2)} New Orleans Saints	12	4	0	.750	6–0	10–2	482	337	W2
^{(5)} Tampa Bay Buccaneers	11	5	0	.688	4–2	8–4	492	355	W4
Carolina Panthers	5	11	0	.313	1–5	4–8	350	402	L1
Atlanta Falcons	4	12	0	.250	1–5	2–10	396	414	L5

==== Conference ====
NFC
#	Team	Division	W	L	T	PCT	DIV	CONF	SOS	SOV	STK
**Division leaders**
1	Green Bay Packers	North	13	3	0	.813	5–1	10–2	.428	.387	W6
2 (Note: New Orleans finished ahead of Seattle based on conference record.)	New Orleans Saints	South	12	4	0	.750	6–0	10–2	.459	.406	W2
3	Seattle Seahawks	West	12	4	0	.750	4–2	9–3	.447	.404	W4
4	Washington Football Team	East	7	9	0	.438	4–2	5–7	.459	.388	W1
**Wild cards**
5	Tampa Bay Buccaneers	South	11	5	0	.688	4–2	8–4	.488	.392	W4
6	Los Angeles Rams	West	10	6	0	.625	3–3	9–3	.494	.484	W1
7 (Note: Chicago finished and clinched the 7th and final playoff spot ahead of Arizona based on better win percentage in common games (against Detroit, the NY Giants, Carolina, and the LA Rams, Chicago finished 3–2, while Arizona finished 1–4).)	Chicago Bears	North	8	8	0	.500	2–4	6–6	.488	.336	L1
**Did not qualify for the postseason**
8	Arizona Cardinals	West	8	8	0	.500	2–4	6–6	.475	.441	L2
9	Minnesota Vikings	North	7	9	0	.438	4–2	5–7	.504	.366	W1
10 (Note: San Francisco finished ahead of the NY Giants based on head-to-head victory. Division tie break was initially used to eliminate Dallas (see below).)	San Francisco 49ers	West	6	10	0	.375	3–3	4–8	.549	.448	L1
11 (Note: NY Giants won tiebreaker over Dallas based on division record.)	New York Giants	East	6	10	0	.375	4–2	5–7	.502	.427	W1
12	Dallas Cowboys	East	6	10	0	.375	2–4	5–7	.471	.333	L1
13 (Note: Carolina finished ahead of Detroit based on head-to-head victory.)	Carolina Panthers	South	5	11	0	.313	1–5	4–8	.531	.388	L1
14	Detroit Lions	North	5	11	0	.313	1–5	4–8	.508	.350	L4
15	Philadelphia Eagles	East	4	11	1	.281	2–4	4–8	.537	.469	L3
16	Atlanta Falcons	South	4	12	0	.250	1–5	2–10	.551	.391	L5
**Tiebreakers** (Note: When breaking ties for three or more teams under the NFL's rules, they are first broken within divisions, then comparing only the highest-ranked remaining team from each division.)

== Postseason ==
=== Schedule ===
Round	Date	Opponent (seed)	Result	Record	Venue	Recap
Wild Card	January 10, 2021	Chicago Bears (7)	W 21–9	1–0	Mercedes-Benz Superdome	Recap
Divisional	January 17, 2021	Tampa Bay Buccaneers (5)	L 20–30	1–1	Mercedes-Benz Superdome	Recap

=== Game summaries ===
==== NFC Wild Card Playoffs: vs. (7) Chicago Bears ====
NFC Wild Card Playoffs: (7) Chicago Bears at (2) New Orleans Saints – Game summary

Quarter	1	2	3	4	Total
Bears	0	3	0	6	9
Saints	7	0	7	7	21

at Mercedes-Benz Superdome, New Orleans, Louisiana

- Date: January 10, 2021
- Game time: 3:40 p.m. CST
- Game weather: None (indoor stadium)
- Game attendance: 3,000
- Referee: Alex Kemp
- TV announcers (CBS/Nickelodeon): Jim Nantz, Tony Romo, Tracy Wolfson and Jay Feely; Noah Eagle, Nate Burleson, Gabrielle Nevaeh Green and Lex Lumpkin (Nickelodeon feed)
- Recap, Game Book

Game information

First quarter

- Michael Thomas 11–yard pass from Drew Brees (Wil Lutz kick), 5:09. Saints 7–0. Drive: 8 plays, 55 yards, 4:17.

Second quarter

- Cairo Santos 36–yard field goal, 8:06. Saints 7–3. Drive: 6 plays, 6 yards, 3:24.

Third quarter

- Latavius Murray 6–yard pass from Drew Brees (Wil Lutz kick), 4:08. Saints 14–3. Drive: 12 plays, 85 yards, 7:29.

Fourth quarter

- Alvin Kamara 3–yard run (Wil Lutz kick), 8:50. Saints 21–3. Drive: 15 plays, 64 yards, 8:51
- Jimmy Graham 19–yard pass from Mitchell Trubisky, 0:00. Saints 21–9. Drive: 11 plays, 99 yards, 2:19.

Top passers

- CHI – Mitchell Trubisky – 19/29, 199 yards, TD
- NO – Drew Brees – 28/39, 265 yards, 2 TD

Top rushers

- CHI – David Montgomery – 12 rushes, 31 yards
- NO – Alvin Kamara – 23 rushes, 99 yards, TD

Top receivers

- CHI – Allen Robinson – 6 receptions, 55 yards
- NO – Deonte Harris – 7 receptions, 83 yards

For the first time since the 2006 season, the Saints met the Bears in the playoffs. It also marked their first victory against Chicago in the playoffs, with the Bears having won the 1990 Wild Card Game and the 2006 NFC Championship Game. It was primarily due to the Saints dominating on both sides of the ball for all four quarters. During a 4th down play, Alex Kemp got confused by misreading Cordarrelle Patterson's uniform number, making Patterson curse on the microphone. Anthony Miller threw a punch at C.J. Gardner-Johnson, resulting in both players getting offsetting unsportsmanlike conduct penalties, thus an ejection for Miller. This was not only aired on CBS, it was also the first game to be aired on Nickelodeon. As of 2025, this was the most recent playoff win for the Saints.

==== NFC Divisional Playoffs: vs. (5) Tampa Bay Buccaneers ====
NFC Divisional Playoffs: (5) Tampa Bay Buccaneers at (2) New Orleans Saints – Game summary

Quarter	1	2	3	4	Total
Buccaneers	0	13	7	10	30
Saints	6	7	7	0	20

at Mercedes-Benz Superdome, New Orleans, Louisiana

- Date: January 17, 2021
- Game time: 5:40 p.m. CST
- Game weather: None (indoor stadium)
- Game attendance: 3,750
- Referee: Shawn Hochuli
- TV announcers (Fox): Joe Buck, Troy Aikman and Erin Andrews
- Recap, Game Book

Game information

First quarter

- NO – Wil Lutz 23–yard field goal, 11:30. Saints 3–0. Drive: 6 plays, 16 yards, 1:48.
- NO – Wil Lutz 42–yard field goal, 4:39. Saints 6–0. Drive: 12 plays, 46 yards, 5:07.

Second quarter

- TB – Ryan Succop 26–yard field goal, 12:57. Saints 6–3. Drive: 15 plays, 67 yards, 6:42.
- TB – Mike Evans 3–yard pass from Tom Brady (Ryan Succop kick), 11:16. Buccaneers 10–6. Drive: 1 play, 3 yards, 0:04.
- NO – Tre'Quan Smith 56–yard pass from Jameis Winston (Wil Lutz kick), 8:08. Saints 13–10. Drive: 6 plays, 75 yards, 3:08.
- TB – Ryan Succop 37–yard field goal, 0:00. Tied 13–13. Drive: 13 plays, 63 yards, 2:28.

Third quarter

- NO – Tre'Quan Smith 16–yard pass from Drew Brees (Wil Lutz kick), 9:43. Saints 20–13. Drive: 10 plays, 75 yards, 5:17.
- TB – Leonard Fournette 6–yard pass from Tom Brady (Ryan Succop kick), 2:22. Tied 20–20. Drive: 5 plays, 40 yards, 2:08.

Fourth quarter

- TB – Ryan Succop 36–yard field goal, 9:52. Buccaneers 23–20. Drive: 11 plays, 61 yards, 5:52.
- TB – Tom Brady 1–yard run (Ryan Succop kick), 4:57. Buccaneers 30–20. Drive: 4 plays, 20 yards, 2:11.

Top passers

- TB – Tom Brady – 18/33, 199 yards, 2 TD
- NO – Drew Brees – 19/34, 134 yards, TD, 3 INT

Top rushers

- TB – Leonard Fournette – 17 rushes, 63 yards
- NO – Alvin Kamara – 18 rushes, 85 yards

Top receivers

- TB – Cameron Brate – 4 receptions, 50 yards
- NO – Tre'Quan Smith – 3 receptions, 85 yards, 2 TD

Even though the Saints swept them in the regular season, they would meet the Buccaneers in the playoffs. This was Drew Brees' last game and the Saints would lose to Tom Brady. Jared Cook would fumble at the goal line after catching a pass. In this game, Alvin Kamara lined up at quarterback, flipped it to Emmanuel Sanders, and then to Jameis Winston, who threw a 56-yard touchdown which was paused due to an accidental flag thrown by the officials, which referee Shawn Hochuli acknowledged that James Hurst checked in as eligible and lined up at the end of the line of scrimmage, thus calling back the flag to reward the Saints a score.
