= Kwon Alexander =

American football player (born 1994)

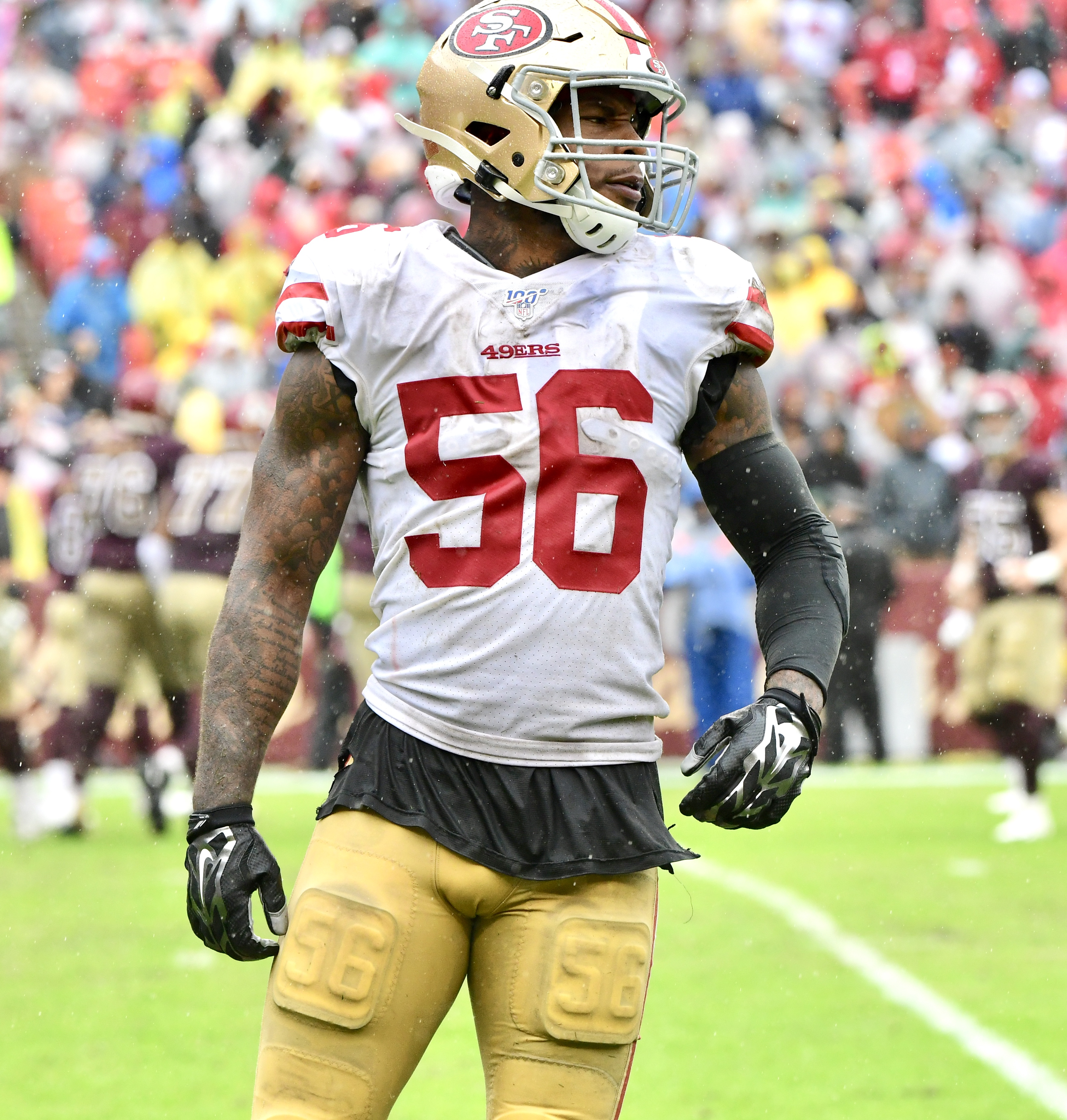
- Alexander with the San Francisco 49ers in 2019

Profile
- Position: Linebacker

Personal information
- Born: August 3, 1994 (age 32); Oxford, Alabama, U.S.
- Listed height: 6 ft 1 in (1.85 m)
- Listed weight: 227 lb (103 kg)

Career information
- High school: Oxford
- College: LSU (2012–2014)
- NFL draft: 2015: 4th round, 124th overall pick

Career history
- Tampa Bay Buccaneers (2015–2018); San Francisco 49ers (2019–2020); New Orleans Saints (2020–2021); New York Jets (2022); Pittsburgh Steelers (2023); Denver Broncos (2024); Detroit Lions (2024)

Awards and highlights
- Pro Bowl (2017); NFL solo tackles leader (2016); PFWA All-Rookie Team (2015); First-team All-SEC (2014)

Career NFL statistics
- Total tackles: 643
- Sacks: 13.5
- Forced fumbles: 13
- Fumble recoveries: 6
- Pass deflections: 34
- Interceptions: 9
- Defensive touchdowns: 1
- Stats at Pro Football Reference

Kwon Alexander (born August 3, 1994) is a former American professional football linebacker. He played college football for the LSU Tigers. He was selected by the Tampa Bay Buccaneers in the fourth round of the 2015 NFL draft. Alexander has also played for the San Francisco 49ers, New Orleans Saints, New York Jets, and the Pittsburgh Steelers.

== Early life ==
Alexander attended Oxford High School in Oxford, Alabama. An impact player on the defensive side of the ball, Alexander missed most of his 2011 senior campaign with a knee injury after posting 144 tackles, 17 sacks, and six forced fumbles (three recoveries) as a junior in 2010. Oxford finished the season 12–2, advancing the AHSAA Class 6A state semi-finals where they lost 32–22 to Marlon Humphrey's Hoover. Alexander participated in the Under Armour All-American Game as a member of the black team. He was chosen as a finalist for the High School Butkus Award, given annually to the nation’s top linebacker. He was also named to the 2011 ESPN All-Alabama Football Team and was a Class 6A All-State Football Team Honorable Mention.

Alexander was also a state qualifier in track & field at Oxford. At the 2011 AHSAA 6A Section 4, he posted personal-best times of 11.24 seconds in the 100-meter dash and 22.99 seconds in the 200-meter dash, placing 9th and 7th, respectively.

Regarded as a four-star prospect according to ESPN.com, Rivals.com, and Scout.com, Alexander was ranked No. 19 in the 2012 Scout.com Final Southeast Top 150. He was ranked No. 45 in the Press-Register Super Southeast 120 and No. 29 in the 2012 ESPNU 150. He was listed in the MaxPreps 2012 Top 100. He was rated as Alabama’s No. 3 prospect by ESPN.com, No. 11 by Rivals.com, and No. 6 by 247Sports.com. Nationally, ESPN.com and Scout.com rated him as the No. 3 linebacker, 247sports.com rated him as the nation’s No. 9 linebacker, while Rivals.com rated him at No. 20. He committed to Louisiana State University (LSU) to play college football.

== College career ==
Alexander attended LSU from 2012 to 2014. As a true freshman, he played in seven games with two starts and had 12 tackles. As a sophomore, he started nine of 13 games. He finished the season with 65 tackles. As a junior, Alexander led the team with 92 tackles and had 1.5 sacks. After his junior season, Alexander entered the 2015 NFL draft.

== Professional career ==
=== Pre-draft ===
On December 31, 2014, Alexander announced on his Twitter account his decision to forgo his senior season and enter the 2015 NFL draft. Alexander was one of 33 collegiate linebackers to attend the NFL Scouting Combine in Indianapolis, Indiana. Alexander completed all of the necessary drills, finishing second among all linebackers in the 40-yard dash, sixth in the bench press and short shuttle, and ninth in the three-cone drill.

External videos
- Kwon Alexander's NFL Combine workout

On March 27, 2015, Alexander attended LSU's pro day, but opted to stand on his combine numbers and only performed positional drills for team representatives and scouts from all 32 NFL teams, including Pittsburgh Steelers' head coach Mike Tomlin and general managers from the Minnesota Vikings, New Orleans Saints, New York Giants, New York Jets, and Steelers. During the draft process, he attended only one private visit with the San Francisco 49ers. At the conclusion of the pre-draft process, Alexander was projected to be a third round pick by NFL draft experts and scouts. He was ranked the second best outside linebacker prospect in the draft by NFL analyst Charles Davis, was ranked the sixth best outside linebacker in the draft by NFLDraftScout.com, and was ranked the seventh best linebacker by Matt Miller of NFLDraftScout.com.

Pre-draft measurables
Height	Weight	Arm length	Hand span	40-yard dash	10-yard split	20-yard split	20-yard shuttle	Three-cone drill	Vertical jump	Broad jump	Bench press
6 ft 0 3/4 in (1.85 m)	227 lb (103 kg)	30 1/4 in (0.77 m)	9 1/4 in (0.23 m)	4.55 s	1.58 s	2.68 s	4.20 s	7.14 s	36 in (0.91 m)	10 ft 1 in (3.07 m)	24 reps
All values from NFL Combine/Pro Day

External videos
- Buccaneers select Kwon Alexander

=== Tampa Bay Buccaneers ===
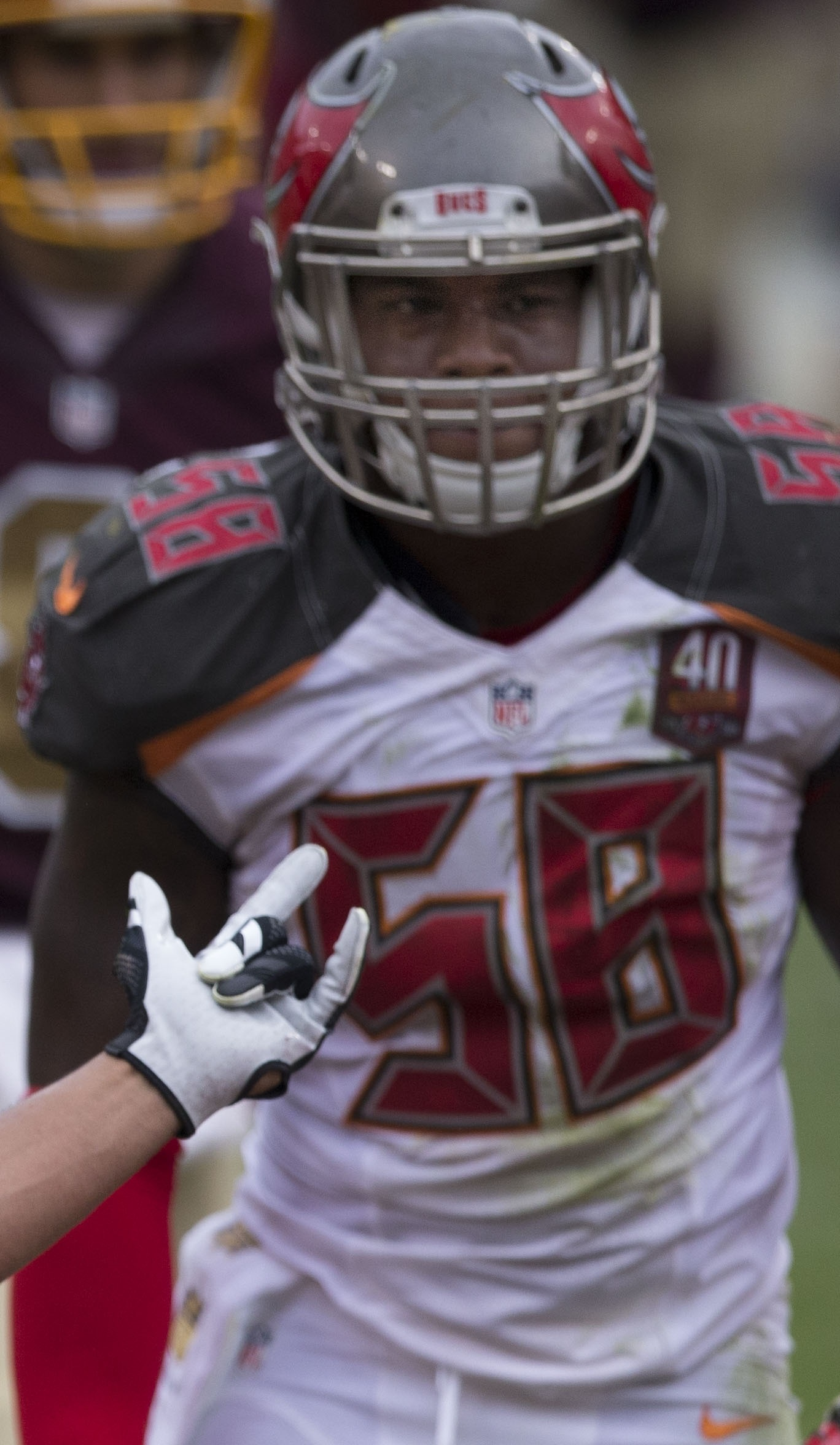
Alexander with the Tampa Bay Buccaneers in 2015

==== 2015 season ====
The Tampa Bay Buccaneers selected Alexander in the fourth round (124th overall) of the 2015 NFL draft. The Buccaneers traded their fourth (128th overall) and seventh round (218th overall) picks to the Oakland Raiders in order to move up four spots and select Alexander. He was the 11th linebacker drafted in 2015. On May 12, 2015, the Buccaneers signed Alexander to a four-year, $2.75 million contract that includes a signing bonus of $478,322.

Alexander entered training camp, competing for the job as the starting strongside linebacker against Danny Lansanah. After performing well, he was moved to middle linebacker to compete for the starting role against veteran Bruce Carter. Head coach Lovie Smith named Alexander the starting middle linebacker alongside outside linebackers Lavonte David and Lansanah.

Alexander made his NFL debut and first NFL start in the season-opener against the Tennessee Titans and recorded five combined tackles and a pass deflection during a 42–14 loss. Two weeks later, he recorded ten combined tackles, two pass deflections, and made his first NFL interception off of a pass attempt by Ryan Mallett in a 19–9 road loss to the Houston Texans. During Week 5, Alexander made five combined tackles, two pass deflections, and made his first NFL sack on Blake Bortles as the Buccaneers defeated the Jacksonville Jaguars by a score of 38–31. Prior to Week 8, Alexander's younger brother, Broderick Taylor, had been murdered just two days prior. He started the following game and recorded 11 combined tackles, a forced fumble, a fumble recovery, and an interception during a 23–20 road victory over the Atlanta Falcons. His efforts earned him the title of NFC Defensive Player of the Week. On December 7, Alexander was given a four-game ban for violating the league's policy on performance-enhancing substances and missed the last four games of the season (Weeks 14–17).

Alexander finished his rookie year with 93 combined tackles (59 solo), nine pass deflections, three sacks, and two interceptions in 12 games and starts. He was named to the PFWA All-Rookie Team. The Buccaneers finished fourth in the NFC South with a 6–10 record and Lovie Smith was fired at the end of the season.

==== 2016 season ====
Offensive coordinator Dirk Koetter was promoted to head coach and hired former Falcons head coach Mike Smith as defensive coordinator. Smith retained Alexander as starting middle linebacker to begin the regular season.

Alexander started in the season-opener at the Falcons and recorded 17 combined tackles and a sack in a 31–24 victory. Two weeks later, he made seven combined tackles and returned an interception off of Case Keenum 38 yards for his first NFL touchdown during a 37–32 loss to the Los Angeles Rams. During Week 8, Alexander recorded a season-high 14 solo tackles and broke up a pass in a 30–24 overtime loss to the Oakland Raiders. During Week 15, he recorded a career-high 21 combined tackles (11 solo) in a 26–20 road loss against the Dallas Cowboys.

Alexander finished his second professional season ranking fourth in the league in tackles with 145 combined (108 solo). He also had seven pass deflections, three sacks, and an interception in 16 games and starts. He earned an overall grade of 77.3 from Pro Football Focus and was their most improved second-year linebackers.

==== 2017 season ====
Alexander started in the season-opener against the Chicago Bears and recorded a solo tackle, a pass deflection, and intercepted former teammate Mike Glennon during a 29–7 victory. He left the game after sustaining a hamstring injury that sidelined him for the next four games (Weeks 3–6). In Week 15, Alexander recorded a season-high 13 solo tackles as the Buccaneers lost to the Falcons by a score 24–21.

Alexander finished his third season with 97 combined tackles (70 solo), four pass deflections, and a career-high three interceptions in 12 games and starts. On January 16, 2018, he was named to his first Pro Bowl replacing injured Seattle Seahawks middle linebacker Bobby Wagner. Pro Football Focus gave Alexander an overall grade of 68.0, ranking him 48th among all qualifying linebackers in 2017.

==== 2018 season ====
Alexander started the first six games of the season before suffering a season-ending torn ACL in Week 7. He was placed on injured reserve on October 22, 2018.

Alexander finished the season with 45 tackles, two sacks, two pass deflections, and a sack in six games and starts.

=== San Francisco 49ers ===
On March 13, 2019, the San Francisco 49ers signed Alexander to a four-year, $54 million contract that includes a signing bonus of $4 million and $25.50 million guaranteed.

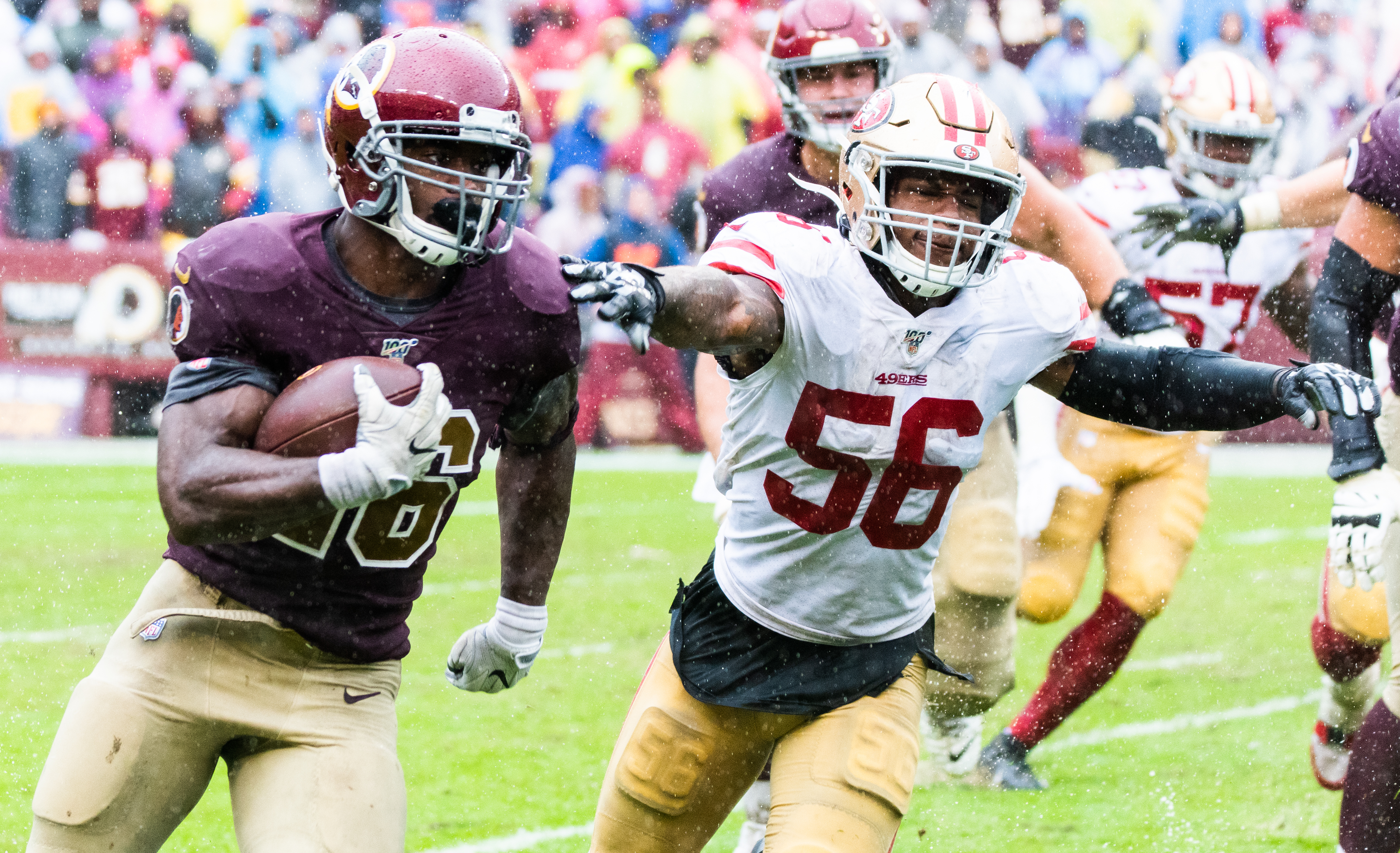
Alexander (right) with the 49ers in 2019

During Week 1 against his former team, the Tampa Bay Buccaneers, Alexander made a helmet-to-helmet hit against former teammate Jameis Winston, and was disqualified as a result. Prior to being ejected, Alexander made three tackles in the season-opening 31–17 road victory. In the next game against the Cincinnati Bengals, Alexander recorded his first interception of the season off of Andy Dalton in the 41–17 road victory. During Week 7 against the Washington Redskins, Alexander forced a fumble on running back Adrian Peterson that was recovered by teammate Jullian Taylor in the 9–0 road victory. Two weeks later against the Arizona Cardinals, he left the eventual 28–25 road victory with an apparent chest injury. The next day, Alexander was diagnosed with a torn pectoral and was placed on injured reserve.

Alexander was designated for return from injured reserve on January 2, 2020, and began practicing with the team again. On January 10, 2020, the 49ers activated Alexander off injured reserve the day before the NFC Divisional Game against the Vikings. He helped the 49ers defeat both the Vikings and Green Bay Packers to advance to Super Bowl LIV, where he recorded a tackle and pass deflection in the 31–20 loss to the Kansas City Chiefs.

=== New Orleans Saints ===
On November 2, 2020, the San Francisco 49ers traded Alexander to the Saints in exchange for a fifth-round conditional pick in the 2021 NFL draft and linebacker Kiko Alonso. He was named a starter in Week 10, and started the next seven games before suffering a torn Achilles in Week 16. He was placed on injured reserve on December 28, 2020.

On March 16, 2021, the Saints released Alexander. On August 3, 2021, the New Orleans Saints brought back Alexander and signed him to a one-year, $1.12 million contract that includes a signing bonus of $387,500. He was placed on injured reserve on September 17, 2021, with an elbow injury. He was activated on October 25.

=== New York Jets ===
On August 2, 2022, the Jets signed Alexander to a one year, $1.27 million contract that includes a signing bonus of $152,500. He played in all 17 of New York's games, starting 12 and racking up 69 tackles.

=== Pittsburgh Steelers ===
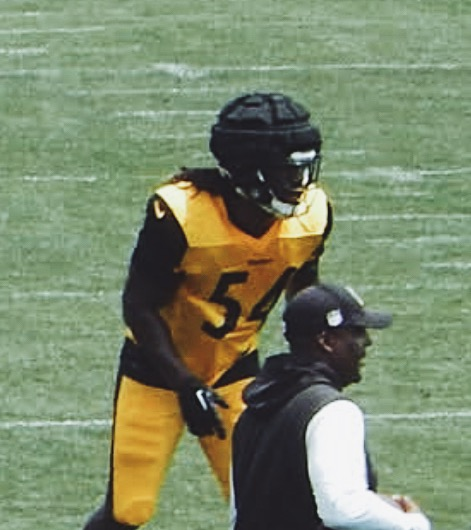
Alexander in 2023 with the Steelers

On July 30, 2023, the Steelers signed Alexander to a one-year, $1.31 million contract that includes a signing bonus of $152,500.

On November 2, 2023, in a Week 9 Thursday Night Football game against the Titans, Alexander made the game-sealing interception of Titans quarterback Will Levis to cement the Steelers' 20–16 home victory. On November 12, 2023, in the Week 10 game against the Green Bay Packers, Alexander suffered a season-ending torn Achilles. Two days later, the Steelers placed him on injured reserve ending his season and subsequently his tenure with the Steelers.

=== Denver Broncos ===
On September 25, 2024, Alexander was signed to the Denver Broncos practice squad.

In three games and two starts with the Broncos, Alexander recorded eight tackles and a forced fumble.

=== Detroit Lions ===
On November 29, 2024, Alexander was signed by the Detroit Lions off the Broncos practice squad. He was released on December 26, and re-signed to the practice squad.

== NFL career statistics ==
Legend
	Led the league
**Bold**	Career high

Regular season statistics
Year	Team	Games		Tackles				Interceptions						Fumbles			
Year	Team	GP	GS	Cmb	Solo	Ast	Sck	Int	Yds	Avg	Lng	TD	PD	FF	FR	Yds	TD
2015	TB	12	12	93	59	44	3.0	2	15	7.5	15	0	**9**	**2**	1	**20**	0
2016	TB	16	16	**145**	**108**	**37**	3.0	1	38	**38.0**	**38T**	**1**	7	1	1	4	0
2017	TB	12	12	97	70	27	0.0	**3**	**70**	23.3	28	0	4	1	0	0	0
2018	TB	6	6	45	34	11	1.0	0	0	0.0	0	0	2	**2**	0	0	0
2019	SF	8	8	34	22	12	0.5	1	0	0.0	0	0	4	1	0	0	0
2020	SF	5	5	30	22	8	0.0	0	0	0.0	0	0	0	1	0	0	0
2020	NO	7	7	27	17	10	0.0	0	0	0.0	0	0	4	1	**2**	**20**	0
2021	NO	12	8	50	39	11	**3.5**	1	0	0.0	0	0	2	1	1	8	0
2022	NYJ	17	12	67	42	27	0.5	0	0	0.0	0	0	1	1	0	0	0
2023	PIT	9	2	41	32	9	1.0	1	0	0.0	0	0	1	1	0	0	0
2024	DEN	3	2	8	3	5	0.0	0	0	0.0	0	0	0	1	1	0	0
2024	DET	2	2	4	1	3	0.0	0	0	0.0	0	0	0	0	0	0	0
Career		109	92	643	449	194	13.5	9	123	13.7	38T	1	34	13	6	52	0

Postseason statistics
Year	Team	Games		Tackles				Interceptions						Fumbles			
Year	Team	GP	GS	Cmb	Solo	Ast	Sck	Int	Yds	Avg	Lng	TD	PD	FF	FR	Yds	TD
2019	SF	3	2	3	3	0	0.0	0	0	0.0	0	0	1	0	0	0	0
Career		3	2	3	3	0	0.0	0	0	0.0	0	0	1	0	0	0	0
