= Ethan Wolf =

American football player (born 1995)

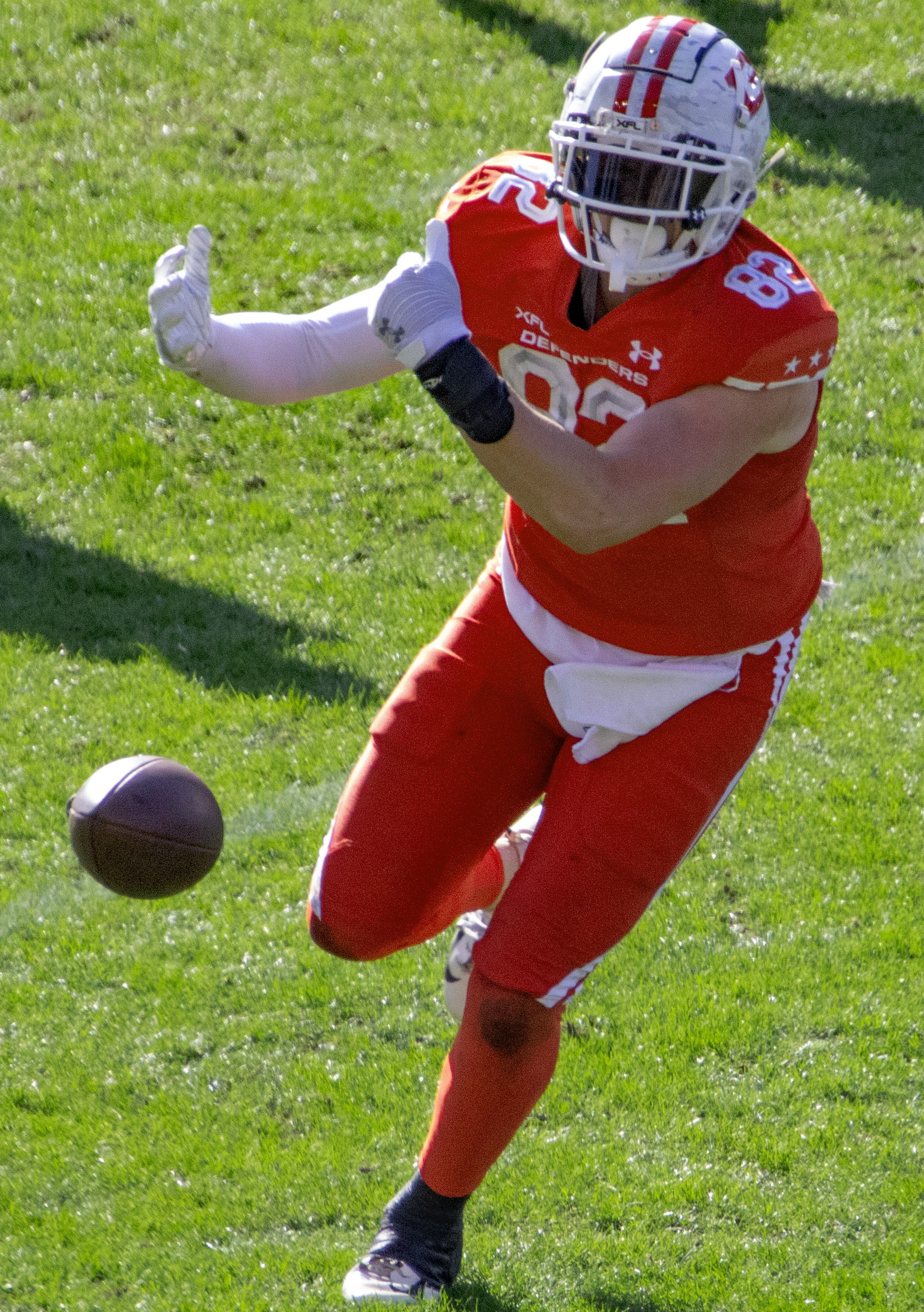
- Wolf with the DC Defenders in 2023

No. 86, 82
- Position: Tight end

Personal information
- Born: November 7, 1995 (age 30); Minster, Ohio, U.S.
- Listed height: 6 ft 6 in (1.98 m)
- Listed weight: 252 lb (114 kg)

Career information
- High school: Minster
- College: Tennessee
- NFL draft: 2018: undrafted

Career history
- Tennessee Titans (2018)*; Green Bay Packers (2018)*; Carolina Panthers (2019)*; Jacksonville Jaguars (2019)*; Green Bay Packers (2019)*; Los Angeles Rams (2019–2020)*; New Orleans Saints (2020)*; Indianapolis Colts (2020)*; New Orleans Saints (2020–2021); DC Defenders (2023)
- * Offseason or practice squad member only

Career NFL statistics
- Receptions: 2
- Receiving yards: 8
- Stats at Pro Football Reference

Ethan Wolf (born November 7, 1995) is an American former professional football player who was a tight end in the National Football League (NFL). He played college football for the Tennessee Volunteers. He played for the New Orleans Saints of the National Football League (NFL) and the DC Defenders of the XFL.

== Early life ==
Wolf played high school football at Minster High School.

== College career ==
Wolf started 11 of his 12 games in his freshman year, becoming the first true freshman to start a season opener for Tennessee, finishing the year with 23 catches for 212 yards. In his sophomore year he started a further 12 games, with 23 catches for 301 yards and two touchdowns. As a junior, he recorded 22 receptions for 247 yards and two touchdowns. He is 4th all-time in receiving yards for a tight end in Tennessee history.

Wolf's younger brother Eli, later joined him on the Tennessee football team, where they both played tight end.

=== Collegiate statistics ===
Ethan Wolf
Year	Rec	Yds	Avg	TD
2014	23	212	9.2	0
2015	22	291	13.2	2
2016	22	247	11.2	2
2017	24	246	10.3	3
Career	91	996	10.9	7

== Professional career ==
=== Tennessee Titans ===
Wolf was signed by the Tennessee Titans as an undrafted free agent on April 28, 2018. He was waived during final roster cuts on September 1.

=== Green Bay Packers ===
Wolf signed to the Green Bay Packers' practice squad on October 30, 2018.

=== Carolina Panthers ===
Wolf signed with the Carolina Panthers following a try-out on May 13, 2019. He was waived by Carolina on August 1.

=== Jacksonville Jaguars ===
Wolf signed for the Jacksonville Jaguars on August 11, 2019. He was waived by Jacksonville on August 30.

=== Green Bay Packers (second stint) ===
Wolf signed to the Packers' practice squad on October 8, 2019. He was released from the practice squad on October 16.

=== Los Angeles Rams ===
Wolf signed with the Los Angeles Rams' practice squad on December 4, 2019. He signed a reserve/future contract with the Rams on December 31, 2019. He was waived by the Rams on July 26, 2020.

=== New Orleans Saints ===
Wolf signed with the New Orleans Saints on August 19, 2020. He was waived as a part of final roster cuts on September 5.

=== Indianapolis Colts ===
Wolf signed to the Indianapolis Colts' practice squad on September 22, 2020. He was released from the practice squad on October 6.

=== New Orleans Saints (second stint) ===
Wolf signed with the Saints' practice squad on November 4, 2020. He signed a reserve/future contract with New Orleans on January 19, 2021. Wolf was waived during final roster cuts on August 31, and re-signed with the practice squad on September 2. He was elevated to the active roster on December 12, ahead of the Saints' Week 14 game against the New York Jets, making his NFL debut in the process. He signed a reserve/future contract with the Saints on January 12, 2022. Wolf was waived by New Orleans on May 13.

=== DC Defenders ===
On November 17, 2022, Wolf was drafted by the DC Defenders of the XFL. He was released on December 13, 2023.
