= Cameron Tom =

American football player (born 1995)

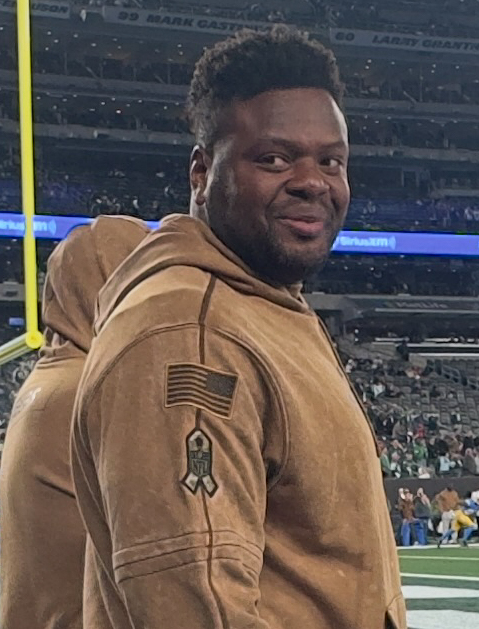
- Tom in 2023

Profile
- Position: Center

Personal information
- Born: June 21, 1995 (age 31); Baton Rouge, Louisiana, U.S.
- Listed height: 6 ft 4 in (1.93 m)
- Listed weight: 287 lb (130 kg)

Career information
- High school: Catholic (Baton Rouge)
- College: Southern Miss (2013–2016)
- NFL draft: 2017: undrafted

Career history
- New Orleans Saints (2017–2020); Miami Dolphins (2021); Philadelphia Eagles (2022–2023)*; Los Angeles Chargers (2023); Washington Commanders (2024)*; Cleveland Browns (2024)*
- * Offseason or practice squad member only

Career NFL statistics
- Games played: 14
- Games started: 1
- Stats at Pro Football Reference

Cameron Shainaan Tom (born June 21, 1995) is an American professional football center. He played college football for the Southern Miss Golden Eagles and signed with the New Orleans Saints as an undrafted free agent in 2017. Tom has also played for the Miami Dolphins, Philadelphia Eagles, Los Angeles Chargers, and Washington Commanders.

== Early life ==
Tom attended and played high school football at Catholic High School. He played offensive guard for the Bears.

== College career ==
Tom attended and played college football at Southern Miss from 2013–2016 under head coaches Todd Monken and Jay Hopson. As a freshman, he started nine games. He made his debut in the season opener against Texas State and earned his first start against Boise State. As a sophomore, he started all 12 games. As a junior, he started all 14 games at the center position.

== Professional career ==
Pre-draft measurables
Height	Weight	Arm length	Hand span	Wingspan	40-yard dash	10-yard split	20-yard split	20-yard shuttle	Three-cone drill	Vertical jump	Broad jump	Bench press
6 ft 3 1/2 in (1.92 m)	291 lb (132 kg)	33 5/8 in (0.85 m)	9 3/8 in (0.24 m)	6 ft 9 7/8 in (2.08 m)	4.89 s	1.73 s	2.83 s	4.59 s	7.57 s	32.0 in (0.81 m)	9 ft 8 in (2.95 m)	23 reps
All values from Pro Day

=== New Orleans Saints ===
Tom signed with the New Orleans Saints as an undrafted free agent on May 1, 2017. He was waived by New Orleans on September 2, and was re-signed to the team's practice squad the following day. Tom was promoted to the active roster on October 25.

Tom made his NFL debut in Week 3 of the 2018 season against the Atlanta Falcons. On August 31, 2019, Tom was placed on injured reserve.

On April 8, 2020, Tom re-signed with the Saints. He was waived by New Orleans on September 5, and re-signed to the practice squad the next day. Tom was elevated to the active roster on November 29 for the team's Week 12 game against the Denver Broncos, and reverted to the practice squad after the game. He was elevated again on January 16, 2021, for the team's divisional playoff game against the Tampa Bay Buccaneers, and reverted to the practice squad again following the game. Tom's practice squad contract with the team expired after the season on January 25.

=== Miami Dolphins ===
On February 3, 2021, Tom signed a reserve/futures contract with the Miami Dolphins. He was waived by Miami on August 31, and re-signed to the practice squad the next day. Tom was promoted to the active roster on November 10. He was waived on December 4 and re-signed to the practice squad. Tom was promoted to the active roster on December 24.

=== Philadelphia Eagles ===
Tom was signed by the Philadelphia Eagles on July 27, 2022. He was waived by Philadelphia on August 30, and was re-signed to the practice squad the following day.

On February 17, 2023, Tom signed a reserve/future contract with the Eagles. He was released by the Eagles on August 27 as a part of final roster cuts before the start of the regular season.

=== Los Angeles Chargers ===
On October 9, 2023, Tom was signed to the Los Angeles Chargers' practice squad. He was signed to the team's active roster on December 18.

=== Washington Commanders ===
Tom signed with the Washington Commanders on August 23, 2024. He was released by the Commanders on August 27.

=== Cleveland Browns ===
On October 15, 2024, Tom signed with the Cleveland Browns' practice squad.

== Personal life ==
Tom's younger brother, Zach Bako-Bewele, is also an offensive lineman in the NFL and went to college at Wake Forest.
