= Malik Henry (wide receiver) =

American gridiron football player (born 1997)

Profile
- Position: Wide receiver

Personal information
- Born: April 16, 1997 (age 29); Tifton, Georgia, U.S.
- Listed height: 6 ft 0 in (1.83 m)
- Listed weight: 179 lb (81 kg)

Career information
- High school: Tift County (Tifton, Georgia)
- College: West Georgia
- NFL draft: 2019: undrafted

Career history
- San Francisco 49ers (2019)*; Indianapolis Colts (2019–2020)*; New Orleans Saints (2020)*; Calgary Stampeders (2021–2025)
- * Offseason or practice squad member only

Awards and highlights
- CFL West All-Star (2022)

Career CFL statistics
- Games played: 25
- Receptions: 87
- Yards: 1,375
- Touchdowns: 11
- Stats at CFL.ca
- Stats at Pro Football Reference

Malik Henry (born April 16, 1997) is an American professional football wide receiver. He most recently played for the Calgary Stampeders of the Canadian Football League (CFL). He played college football at West Georgia. In the NFL, Henry was a member of the San Francisco 49ers, Indianapolis Colts, and New Orleans Saints.

== College career ==
Henry began his collegiate career at Georgia Southern, where he played in 29 games over three years (2015–17) and made 23 catches for 344 yards and one touchdown. Henry also accumulated 382 yards on 18 kickoff returns. Following his junior season, he transferred to West Georgia. Henry played his senior season (2018) at West Georgia and led the Wolves with seven receiving touchdowns. He was second on the team in both catches (30) and receiving yards (407).

== Professional career ==
Pre-draft measurables
Height	Weight	Arm length	Hand span	40-yard dash	10-yard split	20-yard split	20-yard shuttle	Three-cone drill	Vertical jump	Broad jump	Bench press
5 ft 11 1/8 in (1.81 m)	183 lb (83 kg)	32 1/2 in (0.83 m)	7 1/2 in (0.19 m)	4.41 s	1.58 s	2.52 s	4.39 s	7.25 s	36 in (0.91 m)	10 ft 9 in (3.28 m)	22 reps
All values from West Georgia University's Pro Day.

=== San Francisco 49ers ===
After going undrafted in the 2019 NFL draft, Henry was signed by the San Francisco 49ers as an undrafted free agent on May 3, 2019. He was waived on August 31, 2019, and was signed to the practice squad the next day. He was released on October 16, 2019.

=== Indianapolis Colts ===
On December 3, 2019, Henry was signed to the Indianapolis Colts practice squad. He signed a reserve/future contract with the Colts on December 30, 2019. Henry was placed on the reserve/COVID-19 list by the Colts on July 27, 2020. He was activated from the list and subsequently waived on August 12, 2020.

=== New Orleans Saints ===
On September 30, 2020, Henry was signed to the New Orleans Saints practice squad. He was released on October 10, 2020.

=== Calgary Stampeders ===
Henry signed with the Calgary Stampeders of the CFL on January 25, 2021. In his first season with the club, he played in nine games and caught 11 passes for 124 yards with two touchdowns. Henry's second year in the CFL would prove to be a breakout season, as he played in 13 games and recorded 62 receptions for 1,023 yards and eight touchdowns and was rewarded with a three-year contract extension on October 5, 2022. Henry continued his strong play into the 2023 season, catching 14 passes for 228 yards and a touchdown through the first three games, however, he suffered a ruptured Achilles in Calgary's third contest, causing him to miss the remainder of the season. After returning to health for the start of the 2024 season, Henry suffered a patellar tendon injury in practice on May 28, 2024, following the team's first preseason game. Shortly after, the Stampeders announced that he would miss the 2024 season following surgery. He ended up missing the entire 2025 season as well. He became a free agent upon the expiry of his contract on February 10, 2026.

== CFL career statistics ==
=== Regular season ===
Year	Team	Games	Receiving				
Year	Team	GP	Rec	Yds	Avg	Lng	TD
2021	CGY	9	11	124	11.3	19	2
2022	CGY	13	62	1023	16.5	89	8
2023	CGY	3	14	228	16.3	56	1
