= Josh Hill (American football) =

American football player (born 1990)

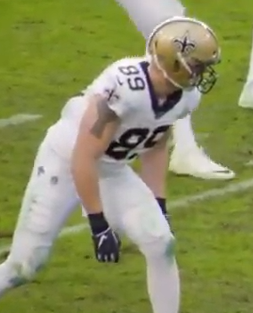
- Hill with the New Orleans Saints in 2019

No. 89
- Position: Tight end

Personal information
- Born: May 21, 1990 (age 36); Blackfoot, Idaho, U.S.
- Listed height: 6 ft 5 in (1.96 m)
- Listed weight: 250 lb (113 kg)

Career information
- High school: Blackfoot
- College: Idaho State
- NFL draft: 2013: undrafted

Career history
- New Orleans Saints (2013–2020); Detroit Lions (2021)*
- * Offseason or practice squad member only

Career NFL statistics
- Receptions: 116
- Receiving yards: 1,071
- Receiving touchdowns: 15
- Stats at Pro Football Reference

Joshua James Hill (born May 21, 1990) is an American former professional football player who was a tight end in the National Football League (NFL). He played college football for the Idaho State Bengals and was signed by the New Orleans Saints as an undrafted free agent in 2013. Hill was also a member of the Detroit Lions.

== Professional career ==
=== New Orleans Saints ===
Hill signed with the New Orleans Saints after not being selected in the 2013 NFL draft.

Hill became a restricted free agent during the 2016 offseason. On March 22, 2016, he signed an offer sheet to join the Chicago Bears. However, three days later, the Saints matched the Bears' offer sheet and re-signed Hill.

In Week 13 of the 2016 season against the Detroit Lions, Hill broke his fibula and was placed on injured reserve on December 9, 2016. He played in nine games with eight starts finishing the season with 15 receptions for 149 yards and a touchdown.

On December 31, 2018, Hill signed a three-year, $8.85 million contract extension with the Saints through the 2021 season.

On December 16, 2019, against the Indianapolis Colts on Monday Night Football, Hill caught a five-yard touchdown, which ended up being quarterback Drew Brees' 540th regular-season touchdown pass, breaking Peyton Manning's previous mark of 539 during the 34–7 victory.

On March 3, 2021, Hill was released by the Saints.

=== Detroit Lions ===
Hill signed with the Detroit Lions on March 13, 2021. He was placed on the reserve/retired list by the team on May 10.

== NFL career statistics ==
=== Regular season ===
Season	Team	Games		Receiving					Rushing					Fumbles	
Season	Team	GP	GS	Rec	Yds	Avg	Lng	TD	Att	Yds	Avg	Lng	TD	FUM	Lost
2013	NO	14	3	6	44	7.3	9	1	1	-8	-8.0	-8	0	0	0
2014	NO	16	3	14	176	12.6	37	5	0	0	0.0	0	0	0	0
2015	NO	16	7	16	120	7.5	19	2	0	0	0.0	0	0	0	0
2016	NO	9	8	15	149	9.9	35	1	0	0	0.0	0	0	0	0
2017	NO	16	11	16	125	7.8	22	1	1	-8	-8.0	-8	0	2	2
2018	NO	16	11	16	185	11.6	23	1	0	0	0.0	0	0	0	0
2019	NO	16	11	25	226	9.0	29	3	0	0	0.0	0	0	0	0
2020	NO	14	7	8	46	5.8	16	1	0	0	0.0	0	0	0	0
Total		117	61	116	1,071	9.2	37	15	2	-16	-8.0	0	0	2	2

=== Postseason ===
Season	Team	Games		Receiving					Rushing					Fumbles	
Season	Team	GP	GS	Rec	Yds	Avg	Lng	TD	Att	Yds	Avg	Lng	TD	FUM	Lost
2013	NO	2	1	2	32	16.0	23	0	0	0	0.0	0	0	0	0
2017	NO	2	1	6	103	17.2	25	1	0	0	0.0	0	0	0	0
2018	NO	2	1	4	31	7.8	24	0	0	0	0.0	0	0	0	0
2019	NO	1	1	2	3	1.5	2	0	0	0	0.0	0	0	0	0
2020	NO	2	0	1	-3	-3.0	-3	0	0	0	0.0	0	0	0	0
Total		9	4	15	166	11.1	25	1	0	0	0.0	0	0	0	0
