= 2019 New Orleans Saints season =

53rd season in franchise history

- Owner: Gayle Benson
- General manager: Mickey Loomis
- Head coach: Sean Payton
- Offensive coordinator: Pete Carmichael Jr.
- Defensive coordinator: Dennis Allen
- Home stadium: Mercedes-Benz Superdome

Results
- Record: 13–3
- Division place: 1st NFC South
- Playoffs: Lost Wild Card Playoffs (vs. Vikings) 20–26 (OT)
- All-Pros: 6: WR Michael Thomas (1st team); RT Ryan Ramczyk (1st team); LB Demario Davis (1st team); PR Deonte Harris (1st team); DE Cameron Jordan (2nd team); ST J. T. Gray (2nd team)
- Pro Bowlers: 11: QB Drew Brees; RB Alvin Kamara; WR Michael Thomas; TE Jared Cook; T Terron Armstead; G Andrus Peat; G Larry Warford; DE Cameron Jordan; CB Marshon Lattimore; K Wil Lutz; RS Deonte Harris

Uniform
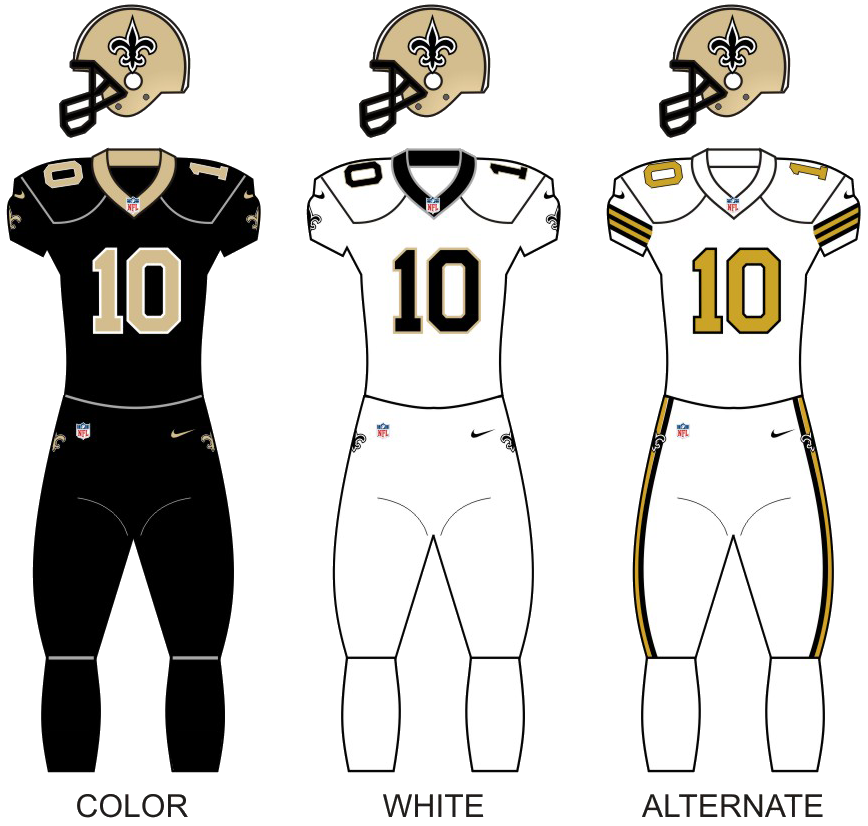

The 2019 season was the New Orleans Saints' 53rd in the National Football League (NFL), their 44th playing home games at the Mercedes-Benz Superdome and their 13th under head coach Sean Payton.

The Saints matched their 13–3 record from their 2018 season, which ended with the team losing in the NFC Championship to the Los Angeles Rams partially due to a controversial pass interference no-call from the Rams defense. They attempted to appear in the Super Bowl for the first time since Super Bowl XLIV. Despite losing Drew Brees to a thumb injury during a week 2 rematch against the Rams, the Saints went 5–0 in the games following his absence under backup Teddy Bridgewater, and won the NFC South for the third consecutive season after beating their division rival Atlanta Falcons on Thanksgiving night. The Saints matched their record from the previous year after defeating their divisional rivals Carolina Panthers in week 17, sweeping them for the second time in three seasons, but were not able to secure a first round bye due to a three way tiebreaker with the San Francisco 49ers and Green Bay Packers. This was the first time in franchise history the Saints posted back-to-back seasons with 12 or more wins. They hosted their rival Minnesota Vikings in the wild card round, the fifth meeting between the two teams in the playoffs. However, for the third time in three straight years, the Saints were eliminated in the playoffs, losing 26–20 to the Vikings in overtime.

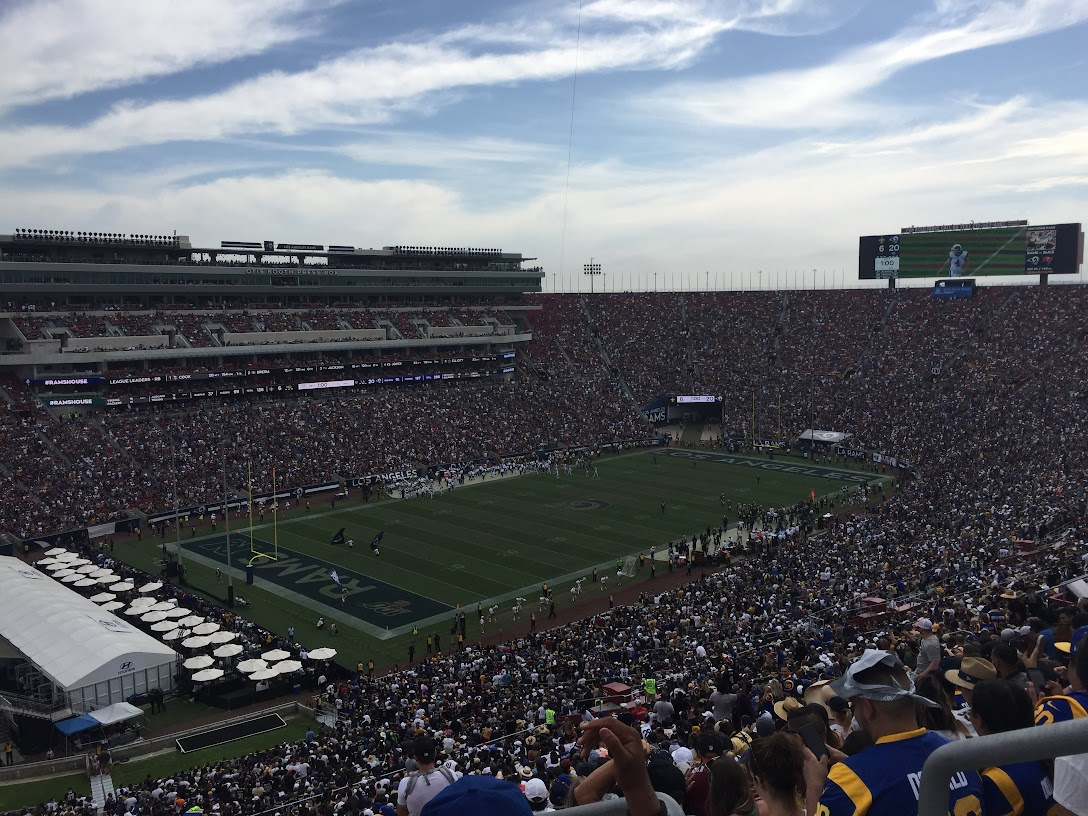
The Saints face off against the Rams during a Week 2 matchup in Los Angeles on September 15, 2019

== Off-season ==
=== Re-signed ===
Position	Player	Age	Contract
QB	Teddy Bridgewater	27	1 year, $7.25 million
LB	Craig Robertson	31	2 years, $4.1 million
S	Chris Banjo	29	3 years, $6.9 million
RT	Michael Ola	30	1 year, $805,000
LS	Zach Wood	26	1 year, $645,000
LB	Vince Biegel	25	1 year, $645,000
CB	Ken Crawley	25	1 year, $2.025 million
K	Wil Lutz	24	5 years, $20.25 million
C	Cameron Tom	23	1 year, $635,000
CB	Justin Hardee	25	1 year, $635,000
CB	P. J. Williams	25	1 year, $5 million

=== New signings ===
Position	Player	Age	2018 team	Contract
G	Nick Easton	26	Minnesota Vikings	4 years, $22.5 million
DT	Malcom Brown	25	New England Patriots	3 years, $15 million
RB	Latavius Murray	28	Minnesota Vikings	4 years, $14.4 million
DT	Mario Edwards Jr.	24	New York Giants	2 years, $5 million
CB	Marcus Sherels	31	Minnesota Vikings	1 year, $1.02 million
TE	Jared Cook	31	Oakland Raiders	2 years, $15.5 million

=== Departures ===
Position	Player	Age	2019 team
DE	Alex Okafor	28	Kansas City Chiefs
RB	Mark Ingram II	29	Baltimore Ravens
WR	Tommylee Lewis	26	Detroit Lions
DT	Tyeler Davison	26	Atlanta Falcons
TE	Benjamin Watson	38	New England Patriots
G	Josh LeRibeus	29	Tampa Bay Buccaneers
SS	Kurt Coleman	30	Buffalo Bills
CB	Josh Robinson	28	Jacksonville Jaguars
DT	Jay Bromley	26	San Francisco 49ers
WR	Dez Bryant	30	Released
TE	Michael Hoomanawanui	30	Released
SS	Rickey Jefferson	24	Released
RB	Daniel Lasco	26	Released
MLB	Manti Te'o	28	Released
DT	Tyrunn Walker	29	Released
C	Max Unger	32	Retired
OT	Jermon Bushrod	34	Retired

== NFL draft ==
2019 New Orleans Saints draft
Round	Pick	Player	Position	College	Notes
2	48	Erik McCoy *	C	Texas A&M	
4	105	C. J. Gardner-Johnson	S	Florida	
6	177	Saquan Hampton	S	Rutgers	
7	231	Alize Mack	TE	Notre Dame	
7	244	Kaden Elliss	LB	Idaho	
Made roster † Pro Football Hall of Fame * Made at least one Pro Bowl during career

Notes

- The Saints traded their 2018 first- and fifth-round selections (27th and 147th overall), and their 2019 first-round selection (30th overall) to the Green Bay Packers in exchange for the Packers' 2018 first-round selection (14th overall).
- The Saints traded their 2019 third-round selection (93rd overall) to the New York Jets in exchange for the Jets' 2019 sixth-round selection (177th overall) and quarterback Teddy Bridgewater.
- The Saints traded their 2019 fourth-round selection (132nd overall) and a 2020 seventh-round selection (238th overall) to the New York Giants in exchange for cornerback Eli Apple.
- The Saints received a 2019 seventh-round selection (231st overall) from the Cleveland Browns in exchange for defensive tackle Devaroe Lawrence.

== Staff ==
2019 New Orleans Saints staff
Front office: Owner – Gayle Benson; President – Dennis Lauscha; Executive vice president/general manager – Mickey Loomis; Asst. general manager/college scouting director – Jeff Ireland; Vice president of football administration – Khai Harley; Director of operations – James Nagaoka; Director of pro scouting – Terry Fontenot; Head coaches: Head coach – Sean Payton; Assistant head coach/tight ends – Dan Campbell; Offensive coaches: Offensive coordinator – Pete Carmichael; Quarterbacks – Joe Lombardi; Running backs – Joel Thomas; Wide receivers – Ronald Curry; Offensive line – Dan Roushar; Assistant offensive line – Brendan Nugent; Senior offensive assistant – Curtis Johnson; Offensive assistant – Kevin Petry	Defensive coaches: Defensive coordinator – Dennis Allen; Defensive line – Ryan Nielsen; Linebackers – Mike Nolan; Secondary – Aaron Glenn; Senior defensive assistant – Peter Giunta; Defensive assistant – Michael Hodges; Defensive assistant – Leigh Torrence; Pass rush specialist – Brian Young; Special teams coaches: Special teams coordinator – Darren Rizzi; Assistant special teams – Phil Galiano; Strength and conditioning: Head strength and conditioning – Dan Dalrymple; Assistant strength and conditioning – Charles Byrd; Assistant strength and conditioning – Rob Wenning

== Final roster ==
2019 New Orleans Saints roster
Quarterbacks (QB): 9 Drew Brees; 5 Teddy Bridgewater; Running backs (RB): 41 Alvin Kamara; 42 Zach Line FB; 28 Latavius Murray; 30 Ricky Ortiz FB; 27 Dwayne Washington; Wide receivers (WR): 19 Ted Ginn Jr.; 11 Deonte Harris; 84 Lil'Jordan Humphrey; 7 Taysom Hill; 10 Tre'Quan Smith; 13 Michael Thomas; Tight ends (TE): 87 Jared Cook; 89 Josh Hill	Offensive linemen (OL): 72 Terron Armstead T; 64 Will Clapp G/C; 62 Nick Easton G; 73 Ethan Greenidge T; 78 Erik McCoy C; 60 Patrick Omameh G; 75 Andrus Peat G; 71 Ryan Ramczyk T; 67 Larry Warford G; Defensive linemen (DL): 90 Malcom Brown DT; 97 Mario Edwards Jr. DE; 96 Carl Granderson DE; 91 Trey Hendrickson DE; 94 Cameron Jordan DE; 93 David Onyemata DT; 57 Noah Spence DE; 95 Taylor Stallworth DT; 99 Shy Tuttle DT	Linebackers (LB): 54 Kiko Alonso MLB; 58 Stephone Anthony OLB; 56 Demario Davis OLB; 53 A. J. Klein OLB; 52 Craig Robertson MLB; 51 Manti Te'o MLB; Defensive backs (DB): 25 Eli Apple CB; 24 Vonn Bell SS; 22 C. J. Gardner-Johnson SS; 48 J. T. Gray FS; 34 Justin Hardee CB; 20 Janoris Jenkins CB; 23 Marshon Lattimore CB; 21 Patrick Robinson CB; 36 D. J. Swearinger SS; 43 Marcus Williams FS; 26 P. J. Williams CB; Special teams (ST): 3 Wil Lutz K; 6 Thomas Morstead P; 49 Zach Wood LS	Practice squad: 17 Emmanuel Butler WR; 77 Jalen Dalton DT; 50 Andrew Dowell OLB; 70 Casey Dunn C; 31 Chris Johnson SS; 68 Derrick Kelly T; 88 Mitchell Loewen TE; 44 Taquan Mizzell RB; 85 Cole Wick TE; Reserve: 47 Alex Anzalone MLB (IR); 29 Johnson Bademosi CB (IR); 80 Austin Carr WR (IR); 92 Marcus Davenport DE (IR); 55 Kaden Elliss OLB (IR); 45 Garrett Griffin TE (IR); 33 Saquan Hampton FS (IR); 42 Chase Hansen OLB (NF-Inj.); 81 Krishawn Hogan WR (IR); 51 Colton Jumper LB (IR); 18 Keith Kirkwood WR (IR); 54 Josh Martin OLB (IR); 98 Sheldon Rankins DT (IR); 63 Cameron Tom C (IR); 86 Jason Vander Laan TE (IR); Rookies in italics 53 active, 15 reserve, 9 practice squad

== Preseason ==
Week	Date	Opponent	Result	Record	Game site	NFL.com recap
1	August 9	Minnesota Vikings	L 25–34	0–1	Mercedes-Benz Superdome	Recap
2	August 18	at Los Angeles Chargers	W 19–17	1–1	Dignity Health Sports Park	Recap
3	August 24	at New York Jets	W 28–13	2–1	MetLife Stadium	Recap
4	August 29	Miami Dolphins	L 13–16	2–2	Mercedes-Benz Superdome	Recap

== Regular season ==
=== Schedule ===
Week	Date	Opponent	Result	Record	Venue	NFL.com recap
1	September 9	Houston Texans	**W** 30–28	1–0	Mercedes-Benz Superdome	Recap
2	September 15	at Los Angeles Rams	**L** 9–27	1–1	Los Angeles Memorial Coliseum	Recap
3	September 22	at Seattle Seahawks	**W** 33–27	2–1	CenturyLink Field	Recap
4	September 29	Dallas Cowboys	**W** 12–10	3–1	Mercedes-Benz Superdome	Recap
5	October 6	**Tampa Bay Buccaneers**	**W** 31–24	4–1	Mercedes-Benz Superdome	Recap
6	October 13	at Jacksonville Jaguars	**W** 13–6	5–1	TIAA Bank Field	Recap
7	October 20	at Chicago Bears	**W** 36–25	6–1	Soldier Field	Recap
8	October 27	Arizona Cardinals	**W** 31–9	7–1	Mercedes-Benz Superdome	Recap
9	Bye					
10	November 10	**Atlanta Falcons**	**L** 9–26	7–2	Mercedes-Benz Superdome	Recap
11	November 17	at **Tampa Bay Buccaneers**	**W** 34–17	8–2	Raymond James Stadium	Recap
12	November 24	**Carolina Panthers**	**W** 34–31	9–2	Mercedes-Benz Superdome	Recap
13	November 28	at **Atlanta Falcons**	**W** 26–18	10–2	Mercedes-Benz Stadium	Recap
14	December 8	San Francisco 49ers	**L** 46–48	10–3	Mercedes-Benz Superdome	Recap
15	December 16	Indianapolis Colts	**W** 34–7	11–3	Mercedes-Benz Superdome	Recap
16	December 22	at Tennessee Titans	**W** 38–28	12–3	Nissan Stadium	Recap
17	December 29	at **Carolina Panthers**	**W** 42–10	13–3	Bank of America Stadium	Recap

Note: Intra-division opponents are in bold text.

=== Game summaries ===
==== Week 1: vs. Houston Texans ====
Week One: Houston Texans at New Orleans Saints – Game summary

Quarter	1	2	3	4	Total
Texans	0	14	7	7	**28**
**Saints**	0	3	14	13	**30**

at Mercedes-Benz Superdome, New Orleans, Louisiana

- Date: September 9
- Game time: 6:10 p.m. CDT
- Game weather: None (indoor stadium)
- Game attendance: 73,039
- Referee: John Hussey
- TV announcers (ESPN): Joe Tessitore, Booger McFarland and Lisa Salters
- Recap, Game Book

Game information

**First quarter**

- No scoring plays.

**Second quarter**

- HOU – Deshaun Watson 21-yard run (Kaʻimi Fairbairn kick), 14:13. Texans 7–0. **Drive: 7 plays, 94 yards, 3:42.**
- NO – Wil Lutz 32-yard field goal, 9:22. Texans 7–3. **Drive: 11 plays, 65 yards, 4:51.**
- HOU – DeAndre Hopkins 2-yard pass from Deshaun Watson (Kaʻimi Fairbairn kick), 1:47. Texans 14–3. **Drive: 16 plays, 75 yards, 7:35.**

**Third quarter**

- NO – Latavius Murray 30-yard run (Wil Lutz kick), 12:51. Texans 14–10. **Drive: 5 plays, 83 yards, 2:09.**
- HOU – DeAndre Hopkins 16-yard pass from Deshaun Watson (Kaʻimi Fairbairn kick), 8:20. Texans 21–10. **Drive: 9 plays, 75 yards, 4:31.**
- NO – Taysom Hill 9-yard pass from Drew Brees (Wil Lutz kick), 2:39. Texans 21–17. **Drive: 11 plays, 75 yards, 5:41.**

**Fourth quarter**

- NO – Tre'Quan Smith 14-yard pass from Drew Brees (Wil Lutz kick), 14:55. Saints 24–21. **Drive: 4 plays, 49 yards, 1:53.**
- NO – Wil Lutz 47-yard field goal, 0:50. Saints 27–21. **Drive: 8 plays, 64 yards, 2:39.**
- HOU – Kenny Stills 37-yard pass from Deshaun Watson (Kaʻimi Fairbairn kick), 0:37. Texans 28–27. **Drive: 2 plays, 75 yards, 0:13.**
- NO – Wil Lutz 58-yard field goal, 0:00. Saints 30–28. **Drive: 6 plays, 35 yards, 0:37.**

**Top passers**

- HOU – Deshaun Watson – 20/30, 268 yards, 3 TD, INT
- NO – Drew Brees – 32/43, 370 yards, 2 TD, INT

**Top rushers**

- HOU – Carlos Hyde – 10 rushes, 83 yards
- NO – Alvin Kamara – 13 rushes, 97 yards

**Top receivers**

- HOU – DeAndre Hopkins – 8 receptions, 111 yards, 2 TD
- NO – Michael Thomas – 10 receptions, 123 yards

The game was an offensive shootout. The Saints started slow and fell behind 14–3 at halftime. The Saints offense took off in the third quarter and they outscored the Texans 24–7 in the next 29 minutes of the game. With less than one minute to play, Texans quarterback Deshaun Watson threw a go-ahead touchdown to wide receiver Kenny Stills; however, the Saints and Brees were able to move the ball down the field and kicker Wil Lutz kicked a 58–yard field goal to lead the team to victory. This was the first time the Saints won their season opener since the 2013 season.

==== Week 2: at Los Angeles Rams ====
Week Two: New Orleans Saints at Los Angeles Rams – Game summary

Quarter	1	2	3	4	Total
Saints	0	3	3	3	**9**
**Rams**	3	3	14	7	**27**

at Los Angeles Memorial Coliseum, Los Angeles, California

- Date: September 15
- Game time: 3:25 pm. CDT/1:25 p.m. PDT
- Game weather: Cloudy, 85 °F (29 °C)
- Game attendance: 71,460
- Referee: Walt Anderson
- TV announcers (Fox): Joe Buck, Troy Aikman and Erin Andrews
- Recap, Game Book

Game information

**First quarter**

- LAR – Greg Zuerlein 24-yard field goal, 8:42. Rams 3–0. **Drive: 7 plays, 56 yards, 3:43.**

**Second quarter**

- NO – Wil Lutz 34-yard field goal, 11:06. Tied 3–3. **Drive: 7 plays, 25 yards, 3:15.**
- LAR – Greg Zuerlein 22-yard field goal, 0:03. Rams 6–3. **Drive: 7 plays, 44 yards, 2:36.**

**Third quarter**

- NO – Wil Lutz 52-yard field goal, 9:49. Tied 6–6. **Drive: 10 plays, 37 yards, 4:16.**
- LAR – Todd Gurley 4-yard run (Greg Zuerlein kick), 5:39. Rams 13–6. **Drive: 9 plays, 75 yards, 4:10.**
- LAR – Brandin Cooks 2-yard pass from Jared Goff (Greg Zuerlein kick), 1:00. Rams 20–6. **Drive: 5 plays, 26 yards, 2:37.**

**Fourth quarter**

- NO – Wil Lutz 42-yard field goal, 10:58. Rams 20–9. **Drive: 9 plays, 51 yards, 5:02.**
- LAR – Jared Goff 1-yard run (Greg Zuerlein kick), 8:37. Rams 27–9. **Drive: 4 plays, 75 yards, 2:21.**

**Top passers**

- NO – Teddy Bridgewater – 17/30, 165 yards
- LAR – Jared Goff – 19/28, 283 yards, TD

**Top rushers**

- NO – Alvin Kamara – 13 rushes, 45 yards
- LAR – Todd Gurley – 16 rushes, 63 yards, TD

**Top receivers**

- NO – Michael Thomas – 10 receptions, 89 yards
- LAR – Cooper Kupp – 5 receptions, 120 yards

In a rematch of 2018's controversial NFC Championship game, Drew Brees collided with Aaron Donald while attempting to pass; the hit broke Brees' thumb, forcing him out of action for the next five weeks following surgery. In place of the injured Brees, Teddy Bridgewater was held to just 165 yards passing. On defense, Cam Jordan strip sacked Jared Goff and returned a fumble 87 yards for a touchdown, which was controversially overturned. Despite this; the Rams went on to blow them out 27-9.

The loss dropped the Saints to 1–1. After the game, head coach Sean Payton agreed to a five-year contract extension. The Saints didn't match up with the Rams until the 2022 season.

==== Week 3: at Seattle Seahawks ====
Week Three: New Orleans Saints at Seattle Seahawks – Game summary

Quarter	1	2	3	4	Total
**Saints**	7	13	7	6	**33**
Seahawks	7	0	0	20	**27**

at CenturyLink Field, Seattle, Washington

- Date: September 22
- Game time: 3:25 p.m. CDT/1:25 p.m. PDT
- Game weather: Rain, 63 °F (17 °C)
- Game attendance: 69,005
- Referee: Ronald Torbert
- TV announcers (CBS): Jim Nantz, Tony Romo and Tracy Wolfson
- Recap, Game Book

Game information

**First quarter**

- NO – Deonte Harris 53-yard punt return (Wil Lutz kick), 12:06. Saints 7–0.
- SEA – Tyler Lockett 8-yard pass from Russell Wilson (Jason Myers kick), 2:24. Tied 7–7. **Drive: 6 plays, 64 yards, 3:28.**

**Second quarter**

- NO – Vonn Bell 33-yard fumble return (kick failed, wide left), 6:50. Saints 13–7.
- NO – Alvin Kamara 29-yard pass from Teddy Bridgewater (Wil Lutz kick), 0:33. Saints 20–7. **Drive: 7 plays, 58 yards, 2:00.**

**Third quarter**

- NO – Michael Thomas 1-yard pass from Teddy Bridgewater (Wil Lutz kick), 7:44. Saints 27–7. **Drive: 12 plays, 75 yards, 7:16.**

**Fourth quarter**

- SEA – Russell Wilson 2-yard run (Jason Myers kick), 11:51. Saints 27–14. **Drive: 10 plays, 78 yards, 3:09.**
- NO – Alvin Kamara 1-yard run (run failed), 4:19. Saints 33–14. **Drive: 8 plays, 28 yards, 5:22.**
- SEA – Russell Wilson 8-yard run (Jason Myers kick), 2:48. Saints 33–21. **Drive: 9 plays, 75 yards, 1:31.**
- SEA – Will Dissly 4-yard pass from Russell Wilson, 0:00. Saints 33–27. **Drive: 11 plays, 82 yards, 1:42.**

**Top passers**

- NO – Teddy Bridgewater – 19/27, 177 yards, 2 TD
- SEA – Russell Wilson – 32/50, 406 yards, 2 TD

**Top rushers**

- NO – Alvin Kamara – 16 rushes, 69 yards, TD
- SEA – Chris Carson – 15 rushes, 53 yards

**Top receivers**

- NO – Alvin Kamara – 9 receptions, 92 yards, TD
- SEA – Tyler Lockett – 11 receptions, 154 yards, TD

In a surprising upset on the road against Seattle without starting quarterback Drew Brees, the Saints led 27–7 going into the fourth quarter thanks to two touchdown passes from quarterback Teddy Bridgewater, in addition to touchdowns off a punt return and a fumble recovery. The Seahawks scored 20 points in the final period, but a short touchdown run from Alvin Kamara proved the difference between the two teams, to move the Saints to 2–1 on the season.

==== Week 4: vs. Dallas Cowboys ====
Week Four: Dallas Cowboys at New Orleans Saints – Game summary

Quarter	1	2	3	4	Total
Cowboys	3	0	7	0	**10**
**Saints**	0	9	0	3	**12**

at Mercedes-Benz Superdome, New Orleans, Louisiana

- Date: September 29
- Game time: 7:20 pm. CST
- Game weather: None (indoor stadium)
- Game attendance: 73,086
- Referee: Carl Cheffers
- TV announcers (NBC): Al Michaels, Cris Collinsworth, Michele Tafoya and Terry McAulay
- Recap, Game Book

Game information

**First quarter**

- DAL – Brett Maher 28-yard field goal, 5:08. Cowboys 3–0. **Drive: 9 plays, 44 yards, 3:34.**

**Second quarter**

- NO – Wil Lutz 40-yard field goal, 14:55. Tied 3–3. **Drive: 9 plays, 52 yards, 5:13.**
- NO – Wil Lutz 42-yard field goal, 8:42. Saints 6–3. **Drive: 7 plays, 27 yards, 4:45.**
- NO – Wil Lutz 19-yard field goal, 0:00. Saints 9–3. **Drive: 8 plays, 43 yards, 1:30.**

**Third quarter**

- DAL – Ezekiel Elliott 1-yard run (Brett Maher kick), 7:47. Cowboys 10–9. **Drive: 11 plays, 84 yards, 5:44.**

**Fourth quarter**

- NO – Wil Lutz 26-yard field goal, 13:41. Saints 12–10. **Drive: 15 plays, 67 yards, 9:06.**

**Top passers**

- DAL – Dak Prescott – 22/33, 223 yards, INT
- NO – Teddy Bridgewater – 23/30, 193 yards, INT

**Top rushers**

- DAL – Ezekiel Elliott – 18 rushes, 35 yards, TD
- NO – Alvin Kamara – 17 rushes, 69 yards

**Top receivers**

- DAL – Jason Witten – 4 receptions, 50 yards
- NO – Michael Thomas – 9 receptions, 95 yards

The Saints found yet another way to win a game without star quarterback Drew Brees and with Teddy Bridgewater at the helm, as Wil Lutz kicked four field goals. It was the first Saints win since week 8 of the 1998 season to feature no touchdowns. The Saints would improve their overall record to 3-1.

==== Week 5: vs. Tampa Bay Buccaneers ====
Week Five: Tampa Bay Buccaneers at New Orleans Saints – Game summary

Quarter	1	2	3	4	Total
Buccaneers	7	3	7	7	**24**
**Saints**	3	14	7	7	**31**

at Mercedes-Benz Superdome, New Orleans, Louisiana

- Date: October 6
- Game time: 12:00 pm. CDT
- Game weather: None (indoor stadium)
- Game attendance: 73,029
- Referee: Brad Allen
- TV announcers (Fox): Chris Myers, Daryl Johnston and Laura Okmin
- Recap, Game Book

Game information

**First quarter**

- NO – Wil Lutz 29-yard field goal, 3:58. Saints 3–0. **Drive: 9 plays, 53 yards, 4:25.**
- TB – Chris Godwin 26-yard pass from Jameis Winston (Matt Gay kick), 0:10. Buccaneers 7–3. **Drive: 2 plays, 20 yards, 0:54.**

**Second quarter**

- NO – Michael Thomas 14-yard pass from Teddy Bridgewater (Wil Lutz kick), 10:13. Saints 10–7. **Drive: 9 plays, 75 yards, 4:57.**
- TB – Matt Gay 42-yard field goal, 5:33. Tied 10–10. **Drive: 8 plays, 51 yards, 4:40.**
- NO – Jared Cook 9-yard pass from Teddy Bridgewater (Wil Lutz kick), 0:32. Saints 17–10. **Drive: 8 plays, 75 yards, 5:01.**

**Third quarter**

- NO – Ted Ginn Jr. 33-yard pass from Teddy Bridgewater (Wil Lutz kick), 13:44. Saints 24–10. **Drive: 3 plays, 75 yards, 1:16.**
- TB – Peyton Barber 2-yard run (Matt Gay kick), 5:03. Saints 24–17. **Drive: 17 plays, 75 yards, 8:41.**

**Fourth quarter**

- NO – Michael Thomas 12-yard pass from Teddy Bridgewater (Wil Lutz kick), 10:37. Saints 31–17. **Drive: 13 plays, 91 yards, 6:27.**
- TB – Chris Godwin 26-yard pass from Jameis Winston (Matt Gay kick), 0:13. Saints 31–24. **Drive: 6 plays, 78 yards, 0:57.**

**Top passers**

- TB – Jameis Winston – 15/27, 204 yards, 2 TD
- NO – Teddy Bridgewater – 26/34, 314 yards, 4 TD, INT

**Top rushers**

- TB – Ronald Jones – 9 rushes, 35 yards
- NO – Alvin Kamara – 16 rushes, 62 yards

**Top receivers**

- TB – Chris Godwin – 7 receptions, 125 yards, 2 TD
- NO – Michael Thomas – 11 receptions, 182 yards, 2 TD

Bridgewater improved to 3–0 as a starter with a strong performance throwing for 314 yards and four touchdowns. The Saints defense sacked Buccaneers quarterback Jameis Winston six times in the win. Buccaneers' cornerback Carlton Davis committed a helmet-to-helmet hit on tight end Jared Cook, resulting in Davis being ejected from the game. After the Saints secured their win against Tampa Bay, they improve their overall record to 4-1.

==== Week 6: at Jacksonville Jaguars ====
Week Six: New Orleans Saints at Jacksonville Jaguars – Game summary

Quarter	1	2	3	4	Total
**Saints**	3	0	3	7	**13**
Jaguars	0	3	3	0	**6**

at TIAA Bank Field, Jacksonville, Florida

- Date: October 13
- Game time: 1:00 p.m. EDT/12:00 pm. CDT
- Game weather: Sunny, 81 °F (27 °C)
- Game attendance: 64,341
- Referee: Jerome Boger
- TV announcers (CBS): Greg Gumbel, Trent Green and Melanie Collins
- Recap, Game Book

Game information

**First quarter**

- NO – Wil Lutz 47-yard field goal, 2:29. Saints 3–0. **Drive: 7 plays, 8 yards, 2:31.**

**Second quarter**

- JAX – Josh Lambo 22-yard field goal, 2:41. Tied 3–3. **Drive: 13 plays, 66 yards, 7:04.**

**Third quarter**

- NO – Wil Lutz 21-yard field goal, 8:40. Saints 6–3. **Drive: 11 plays, 57 yards, 4:49.**
- JAX – Josh Lambo 32-yard field goal, 3:11. Tied 6–6. **Drive: 10 plays, 61 yards, 5:29.**

**Fourth quarter**

- NO – Jared Cook 4-yard pass from Teddy Bridgewater (Wil Lutz kick), 11:49. Saints 13–6. **Drive: 11 plays, 75 yards, 6:22.**

**Top passers**

- NO – Teddy Bridgewater – 24/36, 240 yards, TD
- JAX – Gardner Minshew – 14/29, 163 yards, INT

**Top rushers**

- NO – Latavius Murray – 8 rushes, 44 yards
- JAX – Leonard Fournette – 20 rushes, 72 yards

**Top receivers**

- NO – Michael Thomas – 8 receptions, 89 yards
- JAX – Dede Westbrook – 3 receptions, 53 yards

In a defensive game, both offenses struggled to score as the game was tied 3–3 at halftime and 6–6 at the end of the third quarter. A touchdown pass from Bridgewater to Jared Cook proved to be the difference.

With the win, the Saints improved to 5–1 and Bridgewater improved to 4–0 as a starter. Cook and running back Alvin Kamara suffered injuries during the game.

==== Week 7: at Chicago Bears ====
Week Seven: New Orleans Saints at Chicago Bears – Game summary

Quarter	1	2	3	4	Total
**Saints**	9	3	14	10	**36**
Bears	7	3	0	15	**25**

at Soldier Field, Chicago, Illinois

- Date: October 20
- Game time: 3:25 pm. CDT
- Game weather: Partly cloudy, 54 °F (12 °C)
- Game attendance: 62,306
- Referee: Scott Novak
- TV announcers (Fox): Thom Brennaman, Troy Aikman and Erin Andrews
- Recap, Game Book

Game information

**First quarter**

- NO – Penalty on Pat O'Donnell enforced in end zone for a safety, 13:29. Saints 2–0.
- NO – Josh Hill 7-yard pass from Teddy Bridgewater (Wil Lutz kick), 3:14. Saints 9–0. **Drive: 5 plays, 24 yards, 2:09.**
- CHI – Cordarrelle Patterson 102-yard kickoff return (Eddy Piñeiro kick), 2:59. Saints 9–7.

**Second quarter**

- CHI – Eddy Piñeiro 46-yard field goal, 11:33. Bears 10–9. **Drive: 11 plays, 39 yards, 4:48.**
- NO – Wil Lutz 39-yard field goal, 6:31. Saints 12–10. **Drive: 12 plays, 52 yards, 5:02.**

**Third quarter**

- NO – Latavius Murray 3-yard run (Wil Lutz kick), 12:00. Saints 19–10. **Drive: 6 plays, 75 yards, 3:00.**
- NO – Taysom Hill 4-yard pass from Teddy Bridgewater (Wil Lutz kick), 2:55. Saints 26–10. **Drive: 11 plays, 76 yards, 5:33.**

**Fourth quarter**

- NO – Wil Lutz 30-yard field goal, 12:45. Saints 29–10. **Drive: 9 plays, 38 yards, 3:59.**
- NO – Latavius Murray 4-yard run (Wil Lutz kick), 4:33. Saints 36–10. **Drive: 7 plays, 55 yards, 4:45.**
- CHI – Allen Robinson 7-yard pass from Mitchell Trubisky (Mitchell Trubisky–Adam Shaheen pass), 2:31. Saints 36–18. **Drive: 10 plays, 75 yards, 2:02.**
- CHI – Javon Wims 6-yard pass from Mitchell Trubisky (Eddy Piñeiro kick), 0:48. Saints 36–25. **Drive: 9 plays, 57 yards, 1:43.**

**Top passers**

- NO – Teddy Bridgewater – 23/38, 281 yards, 2 TD
- CHI – Mitchell Trubisky – 34/54, 251 yards, 2 TD

**Top rushers**

- NO – Latavius Murray – 27 rushes, 119 yards, 2 TD
- CHI – Tarik Cohen – 3 rushes, 10 yards

**Top receivers**

- NO – Michael Thomas – 9 receptions, 131 yards
- CHI – Allen Robinson – 10 receptions, 87 yards, TD

The Saints dominated the Bears with a strong performance on both sides of the football. Bridgewater threw for 281 yards and 3 touchdowns. Running back Latavius Murray, filling in for an injured Alvin Kamara, rushed for over 100 yards on the ground. The Saints stifled the Bears offense for the majority of the game before giving up two touchdowns in garbage time. The win improved the Saints to 6–1 and Bridgewater to 5–0, setting the stage for Drew Brees's comeback.

==== Week 8: vs. Arizona Cardinals ====
Week Eight: Arizona Cardinals at New Orleans Saints – Game summary

Quarter	1	2	3	4	Total
Cardinals	3	3	3	0	**9**
**Saints**	0	10	7	14	**31**

at Mercedes-Benz Superdome, New Orleans, Louisiana

- Date: October 27
- Game time: 12:00 pm. CDT
- Game weather: None (indoor stadium)
- Game attendance: 73,064
- Referee: Clay Martin
- TV announcers (CBS): Kevin Harlan, Rich Gannon and Jay Feely
- Recap, Game Book

Game information

**First quarter**

- ARI – Zane Gonzalez 31-yard field goal, 5:41. Cardinals 3–0. **Drive: 6 plays, 50 yards, 3:13.**

**Second quarter**

- NO – Wil Lutz 26-yard field goal, 14:13. Tied 3–3. **Drive: 11 plays, 68 yards, 6:28.**
- NO – Latavius Murray 8-yard run (Wil Lutz kick), 8:59. Saints 10–3. **Drive: 7 plays, 71 yards, 3:59.**
- ARI – Zane Gonzalez 31-yard field goal, 5:18. Saints 10–6. **Drive: 9 plays, 51 yards, 3:41.**

**Third quarter**

- NO – Latavius Murray 15-yard pass from Drew Brees (Wil Lutz kick), 5:25. Saints 17–6. **Drive: 5 plays, 30 yards, 2:07.**
- ARI – Zane Gonzalez 50-yard field goal, 1:42. Saints 17–9. **Drive: 9 plays, 43 yards, 3:43.**

**Fourth quarter**

- NO – Taysom Hill 5-yard pass from Drew Brees (Wil Lutz kick), 12:48. Saints 24–9. **Drive: 7 plays, 75 yards, 3:54.**
- NO – Michael Thomas 9-yard pass from Drew Brees (Wil Lutz kick), 5:18. Saints 31–9. **Drive: 3 plays, 73 yards, 1:25.**

**Top passers**

- ARI – Kyler Murray – 19/33, 220 yards
- NO – Drew Brees – 34/43, 373 yards, 3 TD, INT

**Top rushers**

- ARI – Christian Kirk – 1 rush, 19 yards
- NO – Latavius Murray – 21 rushes, 102 yards, TD

**Top receivers**

- ARI – Charles Clay – 3 receptions, 88 yards
- NO – Michael Thomas – 11 receptions, 112 yards, TD

With Alvin Kamara still sidelined, Drew Brees returned after missing five weeks following thumb surgery. He threw for 373 yards and 3 touchdowns as the Saints dominated the Cardinals to improve to 7–1.

==== Week 10: vs. Atlanta Falcons ====
Week Ten: Atlanta Falcons at New Orleans Saints – Game summary

Quarter	1	2	3	4	Total
**Falcons**	3	10	0	13	**26**
Saints	3	3	3	0	**9**

at Mercedes-Benz Superdome, New Orleans, Louisiana

- Date: November 10
- Game time: 12:00 pm. CST
- Game weather: None (indoor stadium)
- Game attendance: 73,283
- Referee: Brad Allen
- TV announcers (Fox): Kevin Burkhardt, Charles Davis and Pam Oliver
- Recap, Game Book

Game information

**First quarter**

- ATL – Younghoe Koo 37-yard field goal, 9:27. Falcons 3–0. **Drive: 10 plays, 56 yards, 5:33.**
- NO – Wil Lutz 29-yard field goal, 4:09. Tied 3–3. **Drive: 10 plays, 64 yards, 5:18.**

**Second quarter**

- ATL – Austin Hooper 8-yard pass from Matt Ryan (Younghoe Koo kick), 11:09. Falcons 10–3. **Drive: 17 plays, 75 yards, 8:00.**
- ATL – Younghoe Koo 36-yard field goal, 1:31. Falcons 13–3. **Drive: 8 plays, 65 yards, 1:17.**
- NO – Wil Lutz 47-yard field goal, 0:00. Falcons 13–6. **Drive: 9 plays, 46 yards, 1:31.**

**Third quarter**

- NO – Wil Lutz 28-yard field goal, 6:05. Falcons 13–9. **Drive: 9 plays, 28 yards, 3:19.**

**Fourth quarter**

- ATL – Brian Hill 10-yard pass from Matt Ryan (Younghoe Koo kick), 14:53. Falcons 20–9. **Drive: 13 plays, 75 yards, 6:12.**
- ATL – Younghoe Koo 48-yard field goal, 7:27. Falcons 23–9. **Drive: 11 plays, 37 yards, 5:04.**
- ATL – Younghoe Koo 30-yard field goal, 2:32. Falcons 26–9. **Drive: 4 plays, 6 yards, 1:01.**

**Top passers**

- ATL – Matt Ryan – 20/35, 182 yards, 2 TD, INT
- NO – Drew Brees – 32/45, 287 yards

**Top rushers**

- ATL – Brian Hill – 20 rushes, 61 yards
- NO – Alvin Kamara – 4 rushes, 24 yards

**Top receivers**

- ATL – Julio Jones – 3 receptions, 79 yards
- NO – Michael Thomas – 13 receptions, 152 yards

In a shocking fashion, the Saints were defeated by the 1–7 Falcons. Drew Brees had a miserable day, being sacked six times by an inspired Falcons pass-rush; the Falcons had recorded just seven prior to this game.

The loss dropped them to 7–2. The Saints were flagged 10 times for 120 yards in the loss.

==== Week 11: at Tampa Bay Buccaneers ====
Week Eleven: New Orleans Saints at Tampa Bay Buccaneers – Game summary

Quarter	1	2	3	4	Total
**Saints**	13	7	7	7	**34**
Buccaneers	0	7	10	0	**17**

at Raymond James Stadium, Tampa, Florida

- Date: November 17
- Game time: 12:00 pm. CST/1:00 pm. EST
- Game weather: Cloudy, 55 °F (13 °C)
- Game attendance: 54,333
- Referee: Brad Rogers
- TV announcers (Fox): Thom Brennaman, Chris Spielman and Shannon Spake
- Recap, Game Book

Game information

**First quarter**

- NO – Wil Lutz 44-yard field goal, 8:45. Saints 3–0. **Drive: 10 plays, 60 yards, 6:15.**
- NO – Wil Lutz 26-yard field goal, 0:50. Saints 6–0. **Drive: 12 plays, 68 yards, 7:01.**
- NO – Michael Thomas 16-yard pass from Drew Brees (Wil Lutz kick), 0:00. Saints 13–0. **Drive: 1 play, 16 yards, 0:03.**

**Second quarter**

- NO – Jared Cook 3-yard pass from Drew Brees (Wil Lutz kick), 5:13. Saints 20–0. **Drive: 13 plays, 51 yards, 6:42.**
- TB – Peyton Barber 6-yard pass from Jameis Winston (Matt Gay kick), 2:42. Saints 20–7. **Drive: 7 plays, 75 yards, 2:31.**

**Third quarter**

- TB – Matt Gay 55-yard field goal, 11:08. Saints 20–10. **Drive: 10 plays, 38 yards, 3:52.**
- NO – Ted Ginn Jr. 6-yard pass from Drew Brees (Wil Lutz kick), 5:27. Saints 27–10. **Drive: 10 plays, 75 yards, 5:41.**
- TB – Chris Godwin 30-yard pass from Jameis Winston (Matt Gay kick), 1:22. Saints 27–17. **Drive: 8 plays, 75 yards, 4:05.**

**Fourth quarter**

- NO – Marcus Williams 55-yard interception return (Wil Lutz kick), 5:07. Saints 34–17.

**Top passers**

- NO – Drew Brees – 28/35, 228 yards, 3 TD
- TB – Jameis Winston – 30/51, 313 yards, 2 TD, 4 INT

**Top rushers**

- NO – Alvin Kamara – 23 rushes, 75 yards
- TB – Jameis Winston – 2 rushes, 23 yards

**Top receivers**

- NO – Michael Thomas – 8 receptions, 114 yards, TD
- TB – Cameron Brate – 10 receptions, 73 yards

Brees and the Saints bounced back from the previous week. He threw three touchdowns and 228 yards in the game. The Saints defense intercepted Buccaneers QB Jameis Winston four times, including a pick-six by safety Marcus Williams to ice the game in the fourth quarter. The win improved the Saints to 8–2, and they swept the Buccaneers for the first time since 2014.

==== Week 12: vs. Carolina Panthers ====
Week Twelve: Carolina Panthers at New Orleans Saints – Game summary

Quarter	1	2	3	4	Total
Panthers	6	9	9	7	**31**
**Saints**	14	3	14	3	**34**

at Mercedes-Benz Superdome, New Orleans, Louisiana

- Date: November 24
- Game time: 12:00 pm. CST
- Game weather: None (indoor stadium)
- Game attendance: 73,068
- Referee: Alex Kemp
- TV announcers (CBS): Jim Nantz, Tony Romo and Tracy Wolfson
- Recap, Game Book

Game information

**First quarter**

- NO – Latavius Murray 26-yard run (Wil Lutz kick), 10:39. Saints 7–0. **Drive: 7 plays, 75 yards, 4:21.**
- NO – Tre'Quan Smith 13-yard pass from Drew Brees (Wil Lutz kick), 5:12. Saints 14–0. **Drive: 4 plays, 27 yards, 1:30.**
- CAR – D. J. Moore 51-yard pass from Kyle Allen (kick failed, wide right), 3:08. Saints 14–6. **Drive: 4 plays, 75 yards, 2:04.**

**Second quarter**

- NO – Wil Lutz 41-yard field goal, 13:34. Saints 17–6. **Drive: 9 plays, 52 yards, 4:34.**
- CAR – Joey Slye 41-yard field goal, 8:09. Saints 17–9. **Drive: 10 plays, 52 yards, 5:25.**
- CAR – Christian McCaffrey 1-yard pass from Kyle Allen (pass failed), 0:00. Saints 17–15. **Drive: 17 plays, 68 yards, 6:30.**

**Third quarter**

- NO – Jared Cook 20-yard pass from Drew Brees (Wil Lutz kick), 11:18. Saints 24–15. **Drive: 5 plays, 62 yards, 2:40.**
- CAR – Joey Slye 52-yard field goal, 8:36. Saints 24–18. **Drive: 8 plays, 41 yards, 2:42.**
- NO – Michael Thomas 3-yard pass from Drew Brees (Wil Lutz kick), 5:09. Saints 31–18. **Drive: 6 plays, 75 yards, 3:27.**
- CAR – Christian McCaffrey 4-yard run (kick failed, wide right), 1:28. Saints 31–24. **Drive: 7 plays, 71 yards, 3:41.**

**Fourth quarter**

- CAR – D. J. Moore 2-yard pass from Kyle Allen (Joey Slye kick), 9:23. Tied 31–31. **Drive: 6 plays, 50 yards, 3:03.**
- NO – Wil Lutz 33-yard field goal, 0:00. Saints 34–31. **Drive: 11 plays, 65 yards, 1:56.**

**Top passers**

- CAR – Kyle Allen – 23/36, 256 yards, 3 TD
- NO – Drew Brees – 30/39, 311 yards, 3 TD, INT

**Top rushers**

- CAR – Christian McCaffrey – 22 rushes, 64 yards, TD
- NO – Latavius Murray – 7 rushes, 64 yards, TD

**Top receivers**

- CAR – D. J. Moore – 6 receptions, 126 yards, 2 TD
- NO – Michael Thomas – 11 receptions, 101 yards, TD

The game was close all the way. Both Brees and Panthers quarterback Kyle Allen played well, with three touchdown passes each. After benefiting from a pass interference penalty, the Panthers were set up with a 1st-and-goal at the Saints' 5-yard line, but the Saints defense held strong, and kicker Joey Slye missed a short field goal. Brees quickly moved the Saints down the field and Wil Lutz made the game-winning field goal from 36 yards out.

With the win, the Saints improved to 9–2, ensuring a winning record for the third straight season.

==== Week 13: at Atlanta Falcons ====
Thanksgiving Day Games

Week Thirteen: New Orleans Saints at Atlanta Falcons – Game summary

Quarter	1	2	3	4	Total
**Saints**	7	10	3	6	**26**
Falcons	0	9	0	9	**18**

at Mercedes-Benz Stadium, Atlanta, Georgia

- Date: November 28
- Game time: 8:20 pm. EST/7:20 pm. CST
- Game weather: None (retractable roof closed)
- Game attendance: 71,993
- Referee: Shawn Smith
- TV announcers (NBC): Mike Tirico, Tony Dungy, Rodney Harrison and Michele Tafoya
- Recap, Game Book

Game information

**First quarter**

- NO – Taysom Hill 3-yard pass from Drew Brees (Wil Lutz kick), 11:07. Saints 7–0. **Drive: 4 plays, 30 yards, 1:56.**

**Second quarter**

- ATL – Jaeden Graham 18-yard pass from Matt Ryan (kick failed), 12:35. Saints 7–6. **Drive: 3 plays, 55 yards, 0:56.**
- NO – Wil Lutz 22-yard field goal, 9:05. Saints 10–6. **Drive: 8 plays, 77 yards, 3:30.**
- NO – Taysom Hill 30-yard run (Wil Lutz kick), 1:53. Saints 17–6. **Drive: 4 plays, 68 yards, 2:04.**
- ATL – Younghoe Koo 45-yard field goal, 0:03. Saints 17–9. **Drive: 9 plays, 48 yards, 1:50.**

**Third quarter**

- NO – Wil Lutz 47-yard field goal, 5:54. Saints 20–9. **Drive: 10 plays, 51 yards, 4:48.**

**Fourth quarter**

- NO – Wil Lutz 42-yard field goal, 10:14. Saints 23–9. **Drive: 4 plays, 5 yards, 1:31.**
- NO – Wil Lutz 45-yard field goal, 6:27. Saints 26–9. **Drive: 6 plays, 12 yards, 2:14.**
- ATL – Russell Gage 13-yard pass from Matt Ryan (pass failed), 3:26. Saints 26–15. **Drive: 9 plays, 75 yards, 3:01.**
- ATL – Younghoe Koo 43-yard field goal, 1:56. Saints 26–18. **Drive: 8 plays, 34 yards, 1:30.**

**Top passers**

- ATL – Matt Ryan – 35/50, 312 yards, 2 TD, 2 INT
- NO – Drew Brees – 18/30, 184 yards, TD

**Top rushers**

- ATL – Devonta Freeman – 17 rushes, 51 yards
- NO – Alvin Kamara – 11 rushes, 61 yards

**Top receivers**

- ATL – Calvin Ridley – 8 receptions, 91 yards
- NO – Jared Cook – 3 receptions, 85 yards

The Saints played an excellent game and got revenge on their division rivals. The Saints defense played one of its best games of the season with 9 sacks of Matt Ryan and forced 3 takeaways. Taysom Hill blocked a punt early, caught a touchdown pass and ran one in from 30 yards out.

With the win, the Saints clinched the NFC South title for the third straight season. The Saints improved their record to 10-2.

==== Week 14: vs. San Francisco 49ers ====
Week Fourteen: San Francisco 49ers at New Orleans Saints – Game summary

Quarter	1	2	3	4	Total
**49ers**	7	21	7	13	**48**
Saints	13	14	6	13	**46**

at Mercedes-Benz Superdome, New Orleans, Louisiana

- Date: December 8
- Game time: 12:00 p.m. CST
- Game weather: None (indoor stadium)
- Game attendance: 73,038
- Referee: John Hussey
- TV announcers (Fox): Kevin Burkhardt, Charles Davis and Pam Oliver
- Recap, Game Book

Game information

**First quarter**

- NO – Jared Cook 38-yard pass from Drew Brees (Wil Lutz kick), 11:34. Saints 7–0 **Drive: 9 plays, 73 yards, 3:26.**
- SF – Kendrick Bourne 6-yard pass from Jimmy Garoppolo (Robbie Gould kick), 8:26. Tied 7–7 **Drive: 6 plays, 75 yards, 3:08.**
- NO – Jared Cook 26-yard pass from Drew Brees (run failed), 4:51. Saints 13–7 **Drive: 6 plays, 54 yards, 3:35.**

**Second quarter**

- NO – Josh Hill 3-yard pass from Drew Brees (Wil Lutz kick), 14:57. Saints 20–7 **Drive: 5 plays, 29 yards, 2:31.**
- SF – Emmanuel Sanders 75-yard pass from Jimmy Garoppolo (Robbie Gould kick), 14:43. Saints 20–14 **Drive: 1 plays, 75 yards, 0:14.**
- NO – Drew Brees 1-yard run (Wil Lutz kick), 7:29. Saints 27–14 **Drive: 12 plays, 84 yards, 7:14.**
- SF – Raheem Mostert 35-yard pass from Emmanuel Sanders (Robbie Gould kick), 5:59. Saints 27–21 **Drive: 3 plays, 75 yards, 1:30.**
- SF – Raheem Mostert 10-yard run (Robbie Gould kick), 0:42. 49ers 28–27 **Drive: 9 plays, 80 yards, 3:34.**

**Third quarter**

- NO – Wil Lutz 55-yard field goal, 12:36. Saints 30–28 **Drive: 4 plays, 3 yards, 0:54.**
- SF – George Kittle 5-yard pass from Jimmy Garoppolo (Robbie Gould kick), 9:40. 49ers 35–30 **Drive: 2 plays, 20 yards, 0:48.**
- NO – Wil Lutz 48-yard field goal, 4:51. 49ers 35–33 **Drive: 10 plays, 45 yards, 4:49.**

**Fourth quarter**

- SF – Kendrick Bourne 6-yard pass from Jimmy Garoppolo (Robbie Gould kick), 8:59. 49ers 42–33 **Drive: 14 plays, 55 yards, 6:57.**
- NO – Michael Thomas 21-yard pass from Drew Brees (Wil Lutz kick), 6:06. 49ers 42–40 **Drive: 5 plays, 75 yards, 2:53.**
- SF – Robbie Gould 41-yard field goal, 2:23. 49ers 45–40 **Drive: 11 plays, 52 yards, 3:43.**
- NO – Tre'Quan Smith 18-yard pass from Drew Brees (pass failed), 0:53. Saints 46–45 **Drive: 7 plays, 76 yards, 1:30.**
- SF – Robbie Gould 30-yard field goal, 0:00. 49ers 48–46 **Drive: 7 plays, 63 yards, 0:53.**

**Top passers**

- SF – Jimmy Garoppolo – 26/35, 349 yards, 4 TD, INT
- NO – Drew Brees – 29/40, 349 yards, 5 TD

**Top rushers**

- SF – Raheem Mostert – 10 rushes, 69 yards, TD
- NO – Latavius Murray – 7 rushes, 69 yards

**Top receivers**

- SF – Emmanuel Sanders – 7 receptions, 157 yards, TD
- NO – Michael Thomas – 11 receptions, 134 yards, TD

In the NFL's second-highest-scoring game of 2019, Brees and 49ers quarterback Jimmy Garoppolo threw for a combined 698 yards and nine touchdowns as the two teams traded blows all game long. Brees played his best game of the season with his five touchdowns against one of the league's best pass defenses. Although Brees found Tre'Quan Smith late in the game to take a 46–45 lead, Garoppolo connected with tight end George Kittle who ran past several Saints defenders on one of the iconic plays of the season. This set up Robbie Gould's game winning 30-yard field goal as time expired.

With the loss, the Saints fell to 10–3.

==== Week 15: vs. Indianapolis Colts ====
Week Fifteen: Indianapolis Colts at New Orleans Saints – Game summary

Quarter	1	2	3	4	Total
Colts	0	0	0	7	**7**
**Saints**	3	17	14	0	**34**

at Mercedes-Benz Superdome, New Orleans, Louisiana

- Date: December 16
- Game time: 7:15 pm. CST
- Game weather: None (indoor stadium)
- Game attendance: 73,053
- Referee: Shawn Hochuli
- TV announcers (ESPN): Joe Tessitore, Booger McFarland and Lisa Salters
- Recap, Game Book

Game information

**First quarter**

- NO – Wil Lutz 33-yard field goal, 7:28. Saints 3–0. **Drive: 6 plays, 18 yards, 3:35.**

**Second quarter**

- NO – Michael Thomas 15-yard pass from Drew Brees (Wil Lutz kick), 12:37. Saints 10–0. **Drive: 12 plays, 90 yards, 6:17.**
- NO – Tre'Quan Smith 21-yard pass from Drew Brees (Wil Lutz kick), 6:11. Saints 17–0. **Drive: 10 plays, 85 yards, 6:09.**
- NO – Wil Lutz 26-yard field goal, 0:00. Saints 20–0. **Drive: 10 plays, 80 yards, 3:02.**

**Third quarter**

- NO – Josh Hill 5-yard pass from Drew Brees (Wil Lutz kick), 7:08. Saints 27–0. **Drive: 12 plays, 75 yards, 7:52.**
- NO – Taysom Hill 28-yard pass from Drew Brees (Wil Lutz kick), 0:35. Saints 34–0. **Drive: 3 plays, 51 yards, 1:23.**

**Fourth quarter**

- IND – Jordan Wilkins 1-yard run (Chase McLaughlin kick), 3:56. Saints 34–7. **Drive: 11 plays, 80 yards, 3:21.**

**Top passers**

- IND – Jacoby Brissett – 18/34, 165 yards
- NO – Drew Brees – 29/30, 307 yards, 4 TD

**Top rushers**

- IND – Marlon Mack – 11 rushes, 19 yards
- NO – Alvin Kamara – 14 rushes, 66 yards

**Top receivers**

- IND – Zach Pascal – 4 receptions, 44 yards
- NO – Michael Thomas – 12 receptions, 128 yards

Drew Brees threw four touchdown passes, passing Peyton Manning for most career touchdown passes. His completion percentage of 96.67% set a new record for single-game completion percentage (by a quarterback who attempted more than 10 passes in the game) as the Saints demolished the Colts 34–7, improving to 11–3.

==== Week 16: at Tennessee Titans ====
Week Sixteen: New Orleans Saints at Tennessee Titans – Game summary

Quarter	1	2	3	4	Total
**Saints**	0	10	21	7	**38**
Titans	14	0	7	7	**28**

at Nissan Stadium, Nashville, Tennessee

- Date: December 22
- Game time: 12:00 pm. CST
- Game weather: Cloudy, 50 °F (10 °C)
- Game attendance: 66,756
- Referee: Jerome Boger
- TV announcers (Fox): Kenny Albert, Ronde Barber and Sara Walsh
- Recap, Game Book

Game information

**First quarter**

- TEN – Jonnu Smith 41-yard pass from Ryan Tannehill (Greg Joseph kick), 7:55. Titans 7–0. **Drive: 5 plays, 73 yards, 2:42.**
- TEN – A. J. Brown 49-yard run (Greg Joseph kick), 4:50. Titans 14–0. **Drive: 3 plays, 70 yards, 1:11.**

**Second quarter**

- NO – Wil Lutz 47-yard field goal, 13:36. Titans 14–3. **Drive: 13 plays, 41 yards, 6:14.**
- NO – Jared Cook 61-yard pass from Drew Brees (Wil Lutz kick), 2:23. Titans 14–10. **Drive: 1 play, 61 yards, 0:11.**

**Third quarter**

- NO – Alvin Kamara 40-yard run (Wil Lutz kick), 14:00. Saints 17–14. **Drive: 2 plays, 61 yards, 1:00.**
- NO – Alvin Kamara 1-yard run (Wil Lutz kick), 7:08. Saints 24–14. **Drive: 9 plays, 70 yards, 4:00.**
- TEN – Tajae Sharpe 34-yard pass from Ryan Tannehill (Greg Joseph kick), 4:25. Saints 24–21. **Drive: 5 plays, 75 yards, 2:43.**
- NO – Jared Cook 16-yard pass from Drew Brees (Wil Lutz kick), 1:18. Saints 31–21. **Drive: 5 plays, 52 yards, 3:07.**

**Fourth quarter**

- TEN – Tajae Sharpe 7-yard pass from Ryan Tannehill (Greg Joseph kick), 7:27. Saints 31–28. **Drive: 6 plays, 42 yards, 3:15.**
- NO – Michael Thomas 2-yard pass from Drew Brees (Wil Lutz kick), 2:10. Saints 38–28. **Drive: 6 plays, 25 yards, 1:56.**

**Top passers**

- TEN – Ryan Tannehill – 17/27, 272 yards, 3 TD
- NO – Drew Brees – 27/38, 279 yards, 3 TD

**Top rushers**

- TEN – Dion Lewis – 15 rushes, 68 yards
- NO – Alvin Kamara – 11 rushes, 80 yards, 2 TD

**Top receivers**

- TEN – Tajae Sharpe – 5 receptions, 69 yards, 2 TD
- NO – Michael Thomas – 12 receptions, 136 yards, TD

The Saints started the game poorly, falling into an early 14–0 deficit. However, from there they scored 24 unanswered points to take the lead. With the Titans driving and only down 3, Kalif Raymond was tackled by C. J. Gardner-Johnson and lost a fumble; the hit was controversially not flagged.

The Saints improved to 12–3. Michael Thomas broke Marvin Harrison's 18-year record for most receptions in a single season with 145. Alvin Kamara rushed for two touchdowns, his first since Week 3 and bringing his season total to four. The Saints were the only NFC South team to defeat all four of their AFC South opponents in 2019.

==== Week 17: at Carolina Panthers ====
Week Seventeen: New Orleans Saints at Carolina Panthers – Game summary

Quarter	1	2	3	4	Total
**Saints**	14	21	7	0	**42**
Panthers	0	3	7	0	**10**

at Bank of America Stadium, Charlotte, North Carolina

- Date: December 29
- Game time: 12:00 pm. CST/1:00 pm. EST
- Game weather: Cloudy, 63 °F (17 °C)
- Game attendance: 72,203
- Referee: Ronald Torbert
- TV announcers (Fox): Kenny Albert, Ronde Barber and Lindsay Czarniak
- Recap, Game Book

Game information

**First quarter**

- NO – Alvin Kamara 15-yard run (Wil Lutz kick), 10:54. Saints 7–0. **Drive: 8 plays, 75 yards, 4:12.**
- NO – Alvin Kamara 1-yard run (Wil Lutz kick), 1:05. Saints 14–0. **Drive: 11 plays, 57 yards, 6:21.**

**Second quarter**

- NO – A. J. Klein 14-yard interception return (Wil Lutz Kick), 12:10. Saints 21–0.
- NO – Tre'Quan Smith 1-yard pass from Drew Brees (Wil Lutz kick), 6:32. Saints 28–0. **Drive: 9 plays, 50 yards, 4:29**
- NO – Jared Cook 21-yard pass from Drew Brees (Wil Lutz kick), 2:17. Saints 35–0. **Drive: 4 plays, 74 yards, 1:56.**
- CAR – Joey Slye 23-yard field goal, 0:36. Saints 35–3. **Drive: 11 plays, 70 yards, 1:39.**

**Third quarter**

- NO – Taysom Hill 45-yard pass from Drew Brees (Wil Lutz kick), 4:36. Saints 42–3. **Drive: 8 plays, 75 yards, 3:52.**
- CAR – Christian McCaffrey 1-yard run (Joey Slye kick), 0:37. Saints 42–10. **Drive: 9 plays, 75 yards, 3:52.**

**Fourth quarter**

- No scoring plays.

**Top passers**

- CAR – Kyle Allen – 25/41, 295 yards, INT
- NO – Drew Brees – 19/30, 253 yards, 3 TD

**Top rushers**

- CAR – Christian McCaffrey – 9 rushes, 26 yards
- NO – Latavius Murray – 17 rushes, 61 yards

**Top receivers**

- CAR – Brandon Zylstra – 6 receptions, 96 yards
- NO – Tre'Quan Smith – 5 receptions, 56 yards, TD

The Saints dominated the Panthers to end their regular season. Kamara rushed for two more touchdowns and Brees threw three against a bad Panthers defense. Linebacker A. J. Klein intercepted an errant pass by Panthers quarterback Will Grier and returned it for a 14-yard pick-six.

The win improved the Saints to 13–3. However, they were unable to clinch a first-round bye as the Green Bay Packers and San Francisco 49ers also won.

=== Standings ===
==== Division ====
NFC South
	W	L	T	PCT	DIV	CONF	PF	PA	STK
^{(3)} New Orleans Saints	13	3	0	.813	5–1	9–3	458	341	W3
Atlanta Falcons	7	9	0	.438	4–2	6–6	381	399	W4
Tampa Bay Buccaneers	7	9	0	.438	2–4	5–7	458	449	L2
Carolina Panthers	5	11	0	.313	1–5	2–10	340	470	L8

==== Conference ====
NFC
#	Team	Division	W	L	T	PCT	DIV	CONF	SOS	SOV	STK
**Division leaders**
1 (Note: San Francisco finished ahead of Green Bay and New Orleans based on head-to-head sweep, claiming the No. 1 seed.)	San Francisco 49ers	West	13	3	0	.813	5–1	10–2	.504	.466	W2
2 (Note: Green Bay claimed the No. 2 seed over New Orleans based on conference record.)	Green Bay Packers	North	13	3	0	.813	6–0	10–2	.453	.428	W5
3	New Orleans Saints	South	13	3	0	.813	5–1	9–3	.486	.459	W3
4	Philadelphia Eagles	East	9	7	0	.563	5–1	7–5	.455	.417	W4
**Wild Cards**
5	Seattle Seahawks	West	11	5	0	.688	3–3	8–4	.531	.463	L2
6	Minnesota Vikings	North	10	6	0	.625	2–4	7–5	.477	.356	L2
**Did not qualify for the postseason**
7	Los Angeles Rams	West	9	7	0	.563	3–3	7–5	.535	.438	W1
8 (Note: Chicago finished ahead of Dallas based on head-to-head victory.)	Chicago Bears	North	8	8	0	.500	4–2	7–5	.508	.383	W1
9	Dallas Cowboys	East	8	8	0	.500	5–1	7–5	.479	.316	W1
10 (Note: Atlanta finished ahead of Tampa Bay based on division record.)	Atlanta Falcons	South	7	9	0	.438	4–2	6–6	.545	.518	W4
11	Tampa Bay Buccaneers	South	7	9	0	.438	2–4	5–7	.500	.384	L2
12	Arizona Cardinals	West	5	10	1	.344	1–5	3–8–1	.529	.375	L1
13	Carolina Panthers	South	5	11	0	.313	1–5	2–10	.549	.469	L8
14	New York Giants	East	4	12	0	.250	2–4	3–9	.473	.281	L1
15	Detroit Lions	North	3	12	1	.219	0–6	2–9–1	.506	.375	L9
16	Washington Redskins	East	3	13	0	.188	0–6	2–10	.502	.281	L4
**Tiebreakers** (Note: When breaking ties for three or more teams under the NFL's rules, they are first broken within divisions, then comparing only the highest-ranked remaining team from each division.)

== Postseason ==
=== Schedule ===
Round	Date	Opponent (seed)	Result	Record	Venue	NFL.com recap
Wild Card	January 5, 2020	Minnesota Vikings (6)	L 20–26 (OT)	0–1	Mercedes-Benz Superdome	Recap

=== Game summaries ===
==== NFC Wild Card Playoffs: vs. (6) Minnesota Vikings ====
NFC Wild Card Playoffs: (6) Minnesota Vikings at (3) New Orleans Saints – Game summary

Quarter	1	2	3	4	OT	Total
Vikings	3	10	7	0	6	26
Saints	3	7	0	10	0	20

at Mercedes-Benz Superdome, New Orleans, Louisiana

- Date: January 5, 2020
- Game time: 12:05 p.m. CST
- Game weather: None (indoor stadium)
- Game attendance: 73,038
- Referee: Carl Cheffers
- TV announcers (Fox): Joe Buck, Troy Aikman, Erin Andrews and Chris Myers
- Recap, Game Book

Game information

First quarter

- NO – Wil Lutz 29-yard field goal, 9:52. Saints 3–0. Drive: 8 plays, 26 yards, 4:18.
- MIN – Dan Bailey 43-yard field goal, 4:05. Tied 3–3. Drive: 11 plays, 50 yards, 5:47.

Second quarter

- NO – Alvin Kamara 4-yard run (Wil Lutz kick), 9:18. Saints 10–3. Drive: 4 plays, 70 yards, 2:12.
- MIN – Dan Bailey 21-yard field goal, 2:54. Saints 10–6. Drive: 13 plays, 72 yards, 6:24.
- MIN – Dalvin Cook 5-yard run (Dan Bailey kick), 0:23. Vikings 13–10. Drive: 7 plays, 45 yards, 1:40.

Third quarter

- MIN – Dalvin Cook 1-yard run (Dan Bailey kick), 3:23. Vikings 20–10. Drive: 8 plays, 64 yards, 3:37.

Fourth quarter

- NO – Taysom Hill 20-yard pass from Drew Brees (Wil Lutz kick), 10:31. Vikings 20–17. Drive: 8 plays, 85 yards, 4:22.
- NO – Wil Lutz 49-yard field goal, 0:02. Tied 20–20. Drive: 7 plays, 39 yards, 1:53.

Overtime

- MIN – Kyle Rudolph 4-yard pass from Kirk Cousins, 10:40. Vikings 26–20. Drive: 9 plays, 75 yards, 4:20.

Top passers

- MIN – Kirk Cousins – 19/31, 242 yards, TD
- NO – Drew Brees – 26/33, 208 yards, TD, INT

Top rushers

- MIN – Dalvin Cook – 28 rushes, 94 yards, 2 TD
- NO – Alvin Kamara – 7 rushes, 21 yards, TD

Top receivers

- MIN – Adam Thielen – 7 receptions, 129 yards
- NO – Michael Thomas – 7 receptions, 70 yards

With this loss, the Saints suffered their first one-and-done postseason campaign since 2010, their sixth straight playoff loss by one score, their second straight overtime playoff loss and became the first-ever 13–3 team to lose in the wild-card round.
