= Alvin Kamara =

American football player (born 1995)

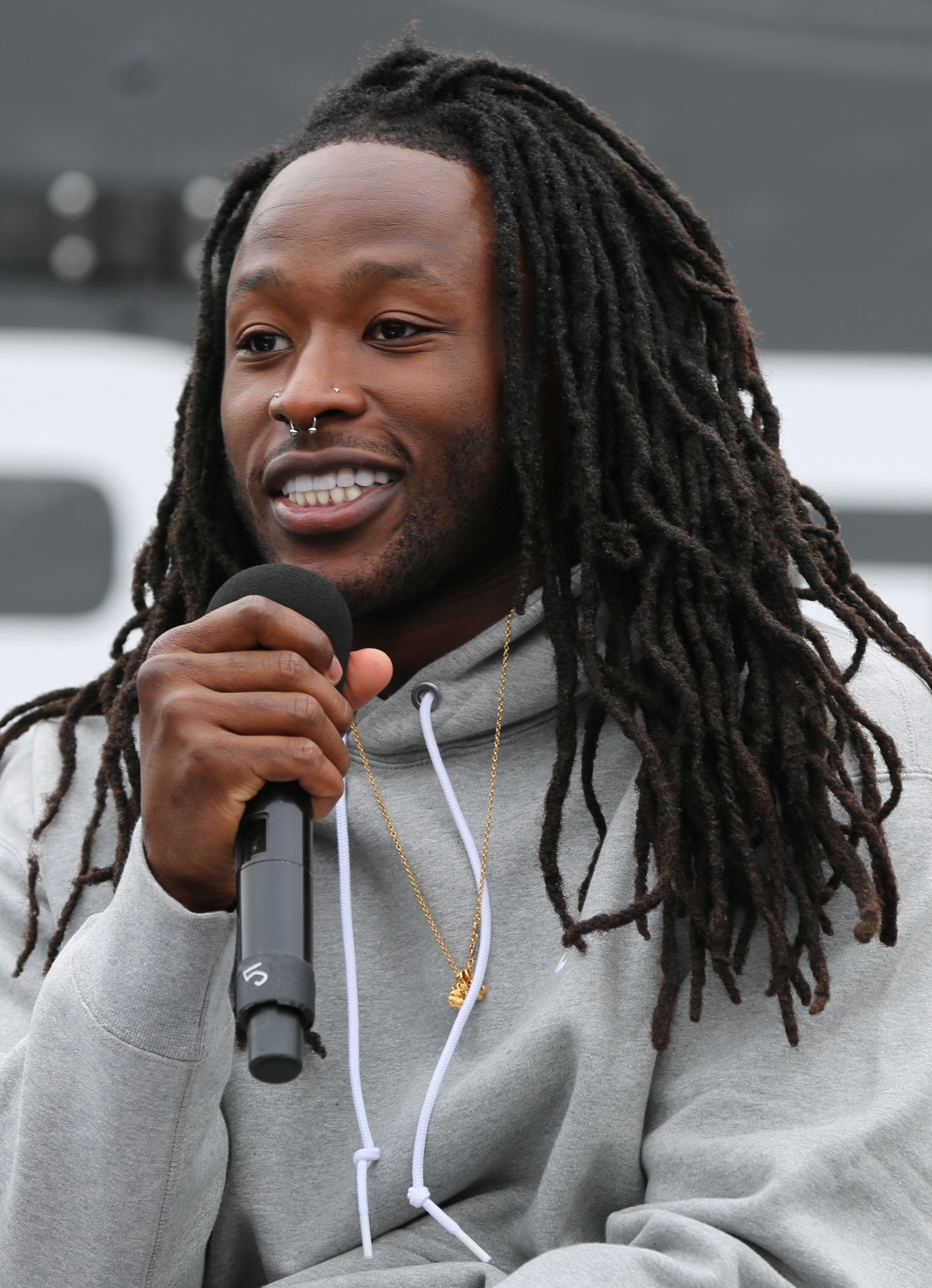
- Kamara in 2023

No. 41 – New Orleans Saints
- Position: Running back
- Roster status: Active

Personal information
- Born: July 25, 1995 (age 31); Atlanta, Georgia, U.S.
- Listed height: 5 ft 10 in (1.78 m)
- Listed weight: 215 lb (98 kg)

Career information
- High school: Norcross (Norcross, Georgia)
- College: Alabama (2013); Hutchinson CC (2014); Tennessee (2015–2016)
- NFL draft: 2017: 3rd round, 67th overall pick

Career history
- New Orleans Saints (2017–present)

Awards and highlights
- NFL Offensive Rookie of the Year (2017); 2× Second-team All-Pro (2017 (Note: Selected as the flex), 2020); 5× Pro Bowl (2017–2021); PFWA All-Rookie Team (2017); NFL records: Rushing touchdowns in a game: 6 (tied with Gale Sayers); Points scored in a game: 36 (tied with Gale Sayers); Career 2-point conversions scored: 7 (tied with Marshall Faulk, Zach Ertz and Saquon Barkley)

Career NFL statistics as of Week 10, 2026
- Rushing yards: 7,411
- Rushing average: 4.3
- Rushing touchdowns: 64
- Receptions: 634
- Receiving yards: 5,108
- Receiving touchdowns: 27
- Stats at Pro Football Reference

Alvin Mentian Kamara (born July 25, 1995) is an American professional football running back for the New Orleans Saints of the National Football League (NFL). He played college football for the Tennessee Volunteers after transferring from Hutchinson Community College and was selected by the Saints in the third round of the 2017 NFL draft. Kamara was named the NFL Rookie of the Year in 2017, was named a Pro Bowler in his first five NFL seasons, and is a two-time second-team All-Pro. In 2020, Kamara became the second player in NFL history to score six rushing touchdowns and 36 points in a single game. Four years later, he became the Saints' all-time rushing leader.

== Early life ==
Kamara was born to a Liberian mother. He attended Norcross High School in Norcross, Georgia. Kamara played high school football for the Blue Devils football team. As a junior in 2011, he rushed for 1,300 yards with 17 touchdowns. As a senior in 2012, Kamara rushed for 2,264 yards with 26 touchdowns, and caught 22 passes for 286 yards and five touchdowns in leading his high school to its first state championship. He scored two touchdowns, including a 61-yard reception, in the 6A state championship game, a 21–14 win.

Kamara was named Georgia’s Mr. Football and all-classification player of the year by the Atlanta Journal-Constitution and earned first-team All-State honors from the Georgia Sports Writers Association. He was also chosen to participate in the 2013 Under Armour All-America Game.

Coming out of high school, Kamara was considered to be one of the top running back prospects in the nation. He was rated the No. 1 all-purpose back in the 247Composite, the No. 5 player in Georgia, and the No. 42 player nationally in 2012. Rivals.com rated Kamara as the No. 6 player in Georgia.

Kamara received a scholarship offer from Syracuse University as a junior in high school. He received 105 letters from Alabama on the same day. His recruitment eventually came down to Georgia and Alabama. He committed to play college football at the University of Alabama under head coach Nick Saban.

== College career ==
=== University of Alabama ===
Kamara's short time at University of Alabama was "a rough experience". He had knee surgery during the preseason, then redshirted as a true freshman when he was unable to break into a recruitment class that featured three other future NFL running backs in Derrick Henry, T. J. Yeldon, and Kenyan Drake. Due to "behavioral issues", Saban banned Kamara from practicing with the team and suspended him from their bowl game.

=== Hutchinson Community College ===
In 2014, Kamara transferred from Alabama to Hutchinson Community College in Kansas for his redshirt freshman season. In nine games, Kamara ran for 1,253 yards with 18 touchdowns and led the Blue Dragons with 1,477 yards of total offense and 21 touchdowns. Kamara was named NJCAA All-American. His successful season with Blue Dragons propelled Kamara to one of the top JUCO prospects in the nation. Kamara earned a five-star rating from the Rivals.com and Scout.com recruiting networks. He was offered by both Tennessee and the Georgia Bulldogs before ultimately committing to the Volunteers.

=== University of Tennessee ===
==== 2015 season ====
In 2015, Kamara transferred to the University of Tennessee to play under head coach Butch Jones. As a redshirt sophomore, Kamara played in all 13 games and shared the backfield with Jalen Hurd and John Kelly. He accounted for 144 yards and two touchdowns in his Tennessee debut against Bowling Green at Nissan Stadium in Nashville, Tennessee, on September 5, 2015; his 144 rushing yards set a school record for most rushing yards in a debut game. Kamara became the second Volunteer in history with a rushing touchdown and punt return for touchdown in the same game with a two-yard rushing touchdown and a 50-yard punt return touchdown against Western Carolina. On November 14 against North Texas, he had 15 carries for 127 yards and two touchdowns in the home victory.

Tennessee finished with a 9–4 record and qualified for the Outback Bowl against #12 Northwestern. In the 45–6 victory over the Wildcats, Kamara had 53 rushing yards and a touchdown. In the entire 2015 season, he accounted for 698 yards (53.7 yards/game) with seven rushing touchdowns. Kamara averaged 6.5 yards per carry, which was third in the Southeastern Conference (SEC). He was second on team in receptions with 34 for 291 yards and three receiving touchdowns. As a punt returner, Kamara had eight returns for 100 yards (12.5 average) with a touchdown.

==== 2016 season ====
In 2016, Kamara was a key contributor for the Volunteers in his redshirt junior season. The running back personnel was the same as the last season for Kamara. In the 2016 Pilot Flying J Battle at Bristol, he had six touches for 34 yards and one touchdown in the 45–24 victory over Virginia Tech. Kamara started his first career game at running back for the Vols in a 28–19 victory over Ohio on September 17. He had 79 all-purpose yards in a 38–28 victory over #19 Florida, including six yards on two carries, 12 yards on one reception and career highs of 61 punt-return yards and six punt returns. Kamara had 138 all-purpose yards, including a receiving touchdown, in a 34–31 victory over #25 Georgia. He had a career-best game the following week in a 45–38 double overtime loss against #8 Texas A&M at Kyle Field, rushing for 127 yards and two touchdowns, and had eight receptions for 161 yards and a touchdown. In the loss, Kamara set a school record with 312 all-purpose yards, breaking a mark set by Chuck Webb in 1989. In the next game against #1 Alabama, Kamara was limited to eight carries for 21 yards but had the Vols' lone touchdown in the 49–10 defeat. He missed some playing time due to being injured. Kamara returned on November 12 in a 49–36 victory over Kentucky. Against the Wildcats, he had 10 carries for 128 yards and two touchdowns. In the 63–37 victory over Missouri, Kamara rushed for 55 yards and two touchdowns. During the regular season finale against Vanderbilt, he had three total touchdowns (two rushing and one receiving) and 141 scrimmage yards in the 45–34 loss. In the final game of his collegiate career, Kamara had seven carries for 31 yards and seven receptions for 46 yards in the victory over #24 Nebraska in the Music City Bowl. He finished third in the SEC in touchdowns for the 2016 season.

At the end of the 2016 season, Kamara decided to forgo his redshirt senior season and enter the 2017 NFL draft. In his two seasons as a Volunteer, Kamara started in only eight of 24 games due to sharing the backfield with Jalen Hurd, but he amassed almost 2,000 yards from scrimmage and averaged a touchdown per game.

== Professional career ==
=== Pre-draft ===
Kamara achieved the highest Wonderlic test score of running backs participating in the NFL Combine that year. He participated at Tennessee's Pro Day, but chose to only run positional routes, the short shuttle, and three-cone drill with 19 other teammates in front of representatives and scouts from every team. Kamara attended five private workouts and visits held by the Carolina Panthers, Chicago Bears, Minnesota Vikings, New Orleans Saints, and Philadelphia Eagles. NFL draft experts and analysts projected him as a second round pick, ranked as either the fourth-best running back (by NFLDraftScout.com, ESPN, and NFL analyst Mike Mayock) in the draft, fifth-best (Bucky Brooks), or seventh-best (by Sports Illustrated).

Pre-draft measurables
Height	Weight	Arm length	Hand span	Wingspan	40-yard dash	10-yard split	20-yard split	20-yard shuttle	Three-cone drill	Vertical jump	Broad jump	Bench press	Wonderlic
5 ft 10 1/4 in (1.78 m)	214 lb (97 kg)	32 3/4 in (0.83 m)	9 1/4 in (0.23 m)	6 ft 6 1/4 in (1.99 m)	4.56 s	1.54 s	2.61 s	4.35 s	7.10 s	39.5 in (1.00 m)	10 ft 11 in (3.33 m)	15 reps	24
All values from NFL Combine/Pro Day

=== 2017 season ===
The Saints selected Kamara in the third round with the 67th overall pick in the 2017 NFL Draft. He was the second of six Tennessee Volunteers to be selected that year. Kamara was the fifth running back selected. As of 2021, he also serves as the Saints' emergency quarterback.

Kamara split backfield duties with Mark Ingram II throughout the 2017 season, with fewer carries but more receptions than his teammate. During the season opener against the Vikings on Monday Night Football, Kamara debuted with seven rushes for 18 yards, four receptions for 20 yards, and one kickoff return for 26 yards. In Week 2 against the New England Patriots, his role in the passing game expanded with three receptions for 51 yards during the 36–20 loss; he also returned three kickoffs, but would return only one more until Week 16 of the season. Kamara scored his first professional touchdown in Week 3 against the Panthers.

During Week 4, he had 96 scrimmage yards, including 10 receptions for 71 yards and a 12-yard touchdown catch. This was followed by 10 carries for 75 yards in Week 5, and 107 yards from scrimmage in Week 6 against the Green Bay Packers. After the bye week, Kamara had a touchdown against the Bears, and then 68 rushing yards including a three-yard touchdown, along with 84 receiving yards including a 33-yard touchdown in a victory over the Tampa Bay Buccaneers.

During a Week 12 loss to the Los Angeles Rams, Kamara provided 101 receiving yards and 87 rushing yards including a 74-yard rushing touchdown. He became the first player since Herschel Walker in 1986 to compile 500 rushing and receiving yards in his first 11 career games, and was the first non-quarterback to average over 7.0 yards per carry through 12 weeks since the merger. In the next game against the Atlanta Falcons, Kamara rushed for 60 yards and two touchdowns and caught five passes for 66 yards, becoming the fourth 600/600 rookie in NFL history, and tying Todd Gurley for the league lead in total touchdowns with 11. However, Kamara suffered a concussion on the first drive and missed the rest of the game. He returned the next week with 44 rushing yards and 45 receiving yards and a touchdown against the New York Jets.

On December 19, 2017, Kamara was named to the Pro Bowl as a rookie alongside Mark Ingram II, becoming the first-ever pair of running backs from the same team to earn the honors. He was named to the NFL All-Rookie Team. After 32 rushing yards and 58 receiving yards in a Week 16 victory over the Falcons, Kamara had a 106-yard kick return for a touchdown, 44 rushing yards and another touchdown, and 84 receiving yards in the regular-season finale against the Buccaneers.

In 2017, Kamara's 728 yards rushing and 826 yards receiving was the first 700/700 season by a Saint, third by an NFL rookie, and the 11th 700/800 season by any NFL player. His 728 rushing yards finished third among rookies behind rushing leader Kareem Hunt and Leonard Fournette. His 81 receptions on the season were first among all rookies and second in the league among running backs behind Le'Veon Bell, and his 826 receiving yards finished first among running backs. Kamara and Ingram became the first running back duo in NFL history to each have over 1,500 scrimmage yards in the same season. Among non-quarterbacks with 100+ carries, his 6.07 yards per rush was the most ever by an NFL rookie. It also was the most ever by any Saints player, and the third most by any NFL player since 1980, trailing only Jamaal Charles (6.38 in 2010) and Barry Sanders (6.13 in 1997).

The Saints finished the 2017 season atop the NFC South with an 11–5 record and qualified for the playoffs. In the Wild Card Round against the Panthers, Kamara had 23 rushing yards, a rushing touchdown, and a 10-yard reception during the 31–26 victory. During the Divisional Round against the Vikings, he caught a 14-yard touchdown from Drew Brees in the fourth quarter to put the Saints up 21–20. However, the Saints lost on the road by a score of 29–24 on the final play of the game. After a spectacular rookie season, Kamara was named the NFL Offensive Rookie of the Year and was named to the Pro Bowl and All-Rookie Team. He was ranked 20th by his fellow players on the NFL Top 100 Players of 2018.

=== 2018 season ===
With teammate Mark Ingram II suspended for the first four games of the regular season, Kamara started the 2018 season as the Saints' main running back. In the season-opening 48–40 loss to the Buccaneers, Kamara had eight carries for 29 yards and two touchdowns to go along with nine receptions for 112 yards and a touchdown. After 99 total yards against the Cleveland Browns in Week 2, Kamara had 66 yards rushing to go with 15 receptions for a career-best 124 yards the following week against the Falcons.

During a Week 4 road victory over the New York Giants, Kamara had career-highs in carries (19), rushing yards (134) and rushing touchdowns (3) to go along with 47 receiving yards to take the NFL lead in total and rushing touchdowns, yards from scrimmage, and all-purpose yards. With his Week 4 performance, Kamara became the first player in NFL history to have 1,000 rushing yards and 1,000 receiving yards in his first 20 games. Ingram returned from suspension for Week 5 against the Washington Redskins and Kamara totaled 39 scrimmage yards in the 43–19 victory. Three weeks later against the Vikings, he had 76 scrimmage yards to go along with a rushing touchdown and a receiving touchdown in the 30–20 victory.

During a Week 9 45–35 victory over the Rams, Kamara had 116 scrimmage yards and scored three total touchdowns in the first half (two rushing and one receiving). In the next game against the Cincinnati Bengals, he had 102 scrimmage yards and two rushing touchdowns in the 51–14 victory. During a Week 15 12–9 road victory over the Panthers, Kamara scored the Saints' lone touchdown on a 16-yard rush. In the next game against the Pittsburgh Steelers, Kamara scored two rushing touchdowns during the 31–28 victory, tying the franchise record for most touchdowns in a single season. Kamara sat out Week 17 with the Saints having already clinched the first seed for the National Football Conference (NFC) playoffs.

Kamara finished his second professional season with 194 carries for 883 yards and 14 touchdowns to go along with 81 receptions for 709 yards and four touchdowns in 15 games and 13 starts. He was named to the Pro Bowl for his accomplishments in the 2018 season.

In the Divisional Round against the Eagles, Kamara had 16 carries for 71 yards and four receptions for 35 yards during the 20–14 victory. During the NFC Championship Game against the Rams, he had eight carries for 15 yards to go along with 11 receptions for 96 yards in the 26–23 controversial overtime loss. Kamara was ranked 14th by his fellow players on the NFL Top 100 Players of 2019.

=== 2019 season ===
During the season-opener against the Houston Texans on Monday Night Football, Kamara had 169 scrimmage yards in the narrow 30–28 victory. Two weeks later against the Seattle Seahawks, Kamara had 161 scrimmage yards, a rushing touchdown, and a receiving touchdown in the 33–27 road victory.

During Week 5 against the Buccaneers, Kamara had 16 carries for 62 yards and caught six passes for 42 yards in the 31–24 victory. He missed two games in Weeks 7 and 8 after battling ankle and knee injuries, but returned in Week 10 following a Week 9 bye. During Week 16 against the Tennessee Titans, Kamara rushed 11 times for 80 yards and two touchdowns and caught six passes for 30 yards in the 38–28 road victory. In the regular season finale against the Panthers, he rushed for two touchdowns during the 42–10 road victory.

Kamara finished the 2019 season with 171 carries for 797 yards and five touchdowns to go along with 81 receptions for 533 yards and a touchdown in 14 games and nine starts. He made his third Pro Bowl in as many professional seasons. In the Wild Card Round against the Vikings, Kamara had seven carries for 21 yards and a touchdown and caught eight passes for 34 yards during the 26–20 overtime loss. He was ranked 42nd by his fellow players on the NFL Top 100 Players of 2020.

=== 2020 season ===
The day before the season opener, Kamara signed a five-year contract extension worth $75 million.

During the season-opener against the Buccaneers, Kamara had a rushing and a receiving touchdown during the 34–23 victory. In the next game against the Las Vegas Raiders on Monday Night Football, he had 174 scrimmage yards (79 rushing, 95 receiving) and two rushing touchdowns including the first ever touchdown scored in Allegiant Stadium and the first ever NFL touchdown scored in Las Vegas during the 34–24 road loss. The following week on Sunday Night Football against the Packers, Kamara finished with 58 rushing yards, 139 receiving yards, and two total touchdowns in the 37–30 loss.

During Week 7 against the Panthers, Kamara finished with 148 scrimmage yards in the 27–24 victory. In the next game against the Bears, he had 163 scrimmage yards during the 26–23 overtime road victory. Two weeks later against the San Francisco 49ers, Kamara had 98 scrimmage yards, two rushing touchdowns, and a receiving touchdown in the 27–13 victory.

On Christmas Day, Kamara rushed for 155 yards in a 52–33 victory over the Vikings and tied the NFL record of six rushing touchdowns in a single game. Kamara was named NFC Offensive Player of the Week for his historic performance. Kamara was forced to miss Week 17 against the Panthers due to being placed on the reserve/COVID-19 list on January 1, 2021.

Kamara finished the regular season with 187 carries for 932 yards and 16 touchdowns to go along with 83 receptions for 756 yards and five touchdowns. His 16 rushing touchdowns tied him with Dalvin Cook for second-most in the NFL, trailing only Derrick Henry's 17 touchdowns. Kamara's 21 total touchdowns led the NFL. He became the first player in NFL history to record at least 500 rushing yards and 500 receiving yards in each of his first four seasons. Kamara earned votes for Associated Press Offensive Player of the Year, but finished sixth. He made his fourth Pro Bowl for his achievements in the 2020 season.

Kamara was activated from the COVID-19 list on January 9, 2021. In the Wild Card Round against the Bears, Kamara rushed for 99 yards and a touchdown and caught two passes for 17 yards during the 21–9 victory. During the Divisional Round against the Buccaneers, he recorded 105 scrimmage yards during the 30–20 loss. Kamara was ranked 14th by his fellow players on the NFL Top 100 Players of 2021.

=== 2021 season ===
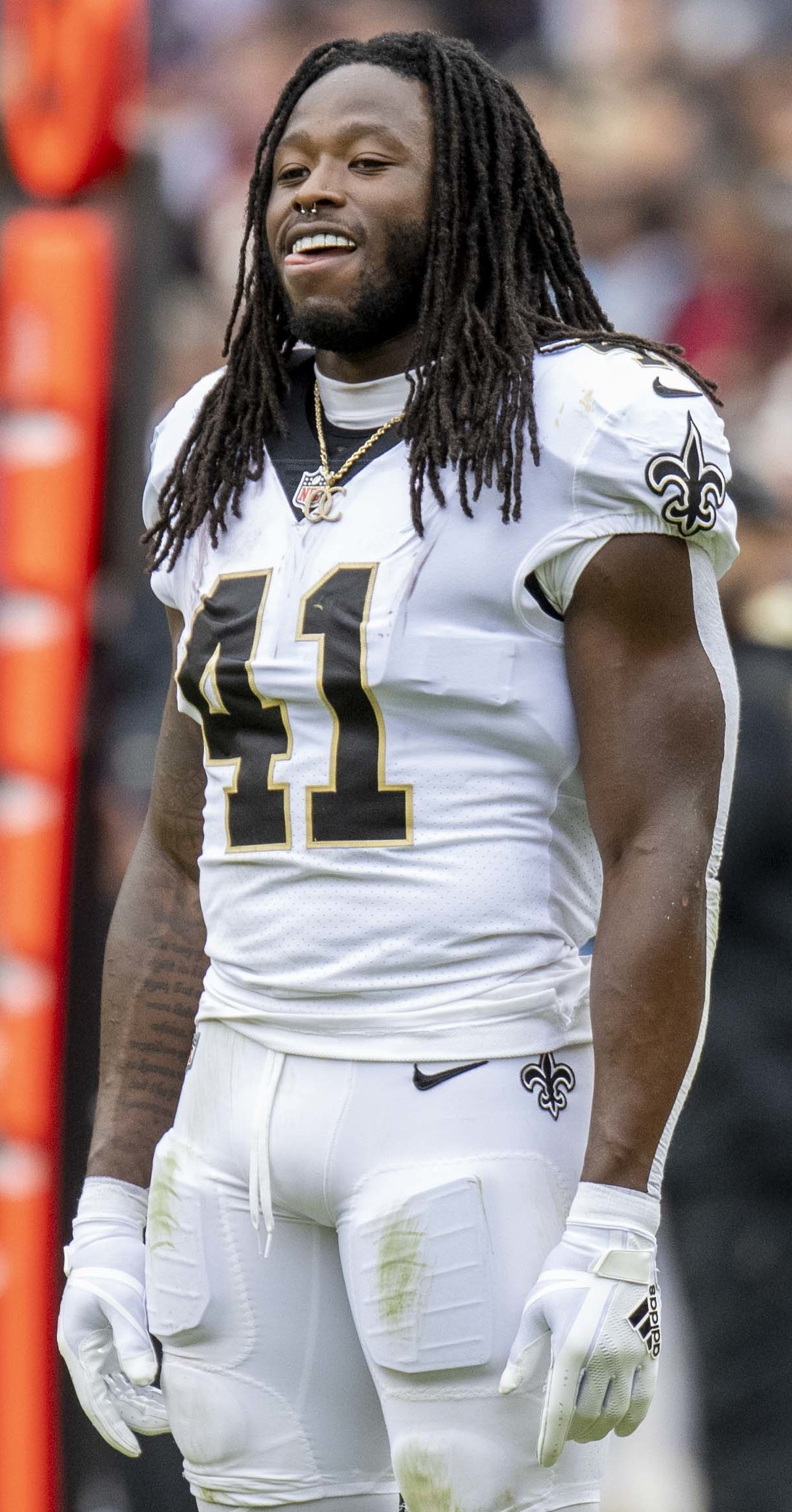
Kamara in 2021

During Week 7 against the Seahawks, Kamara had 10 receptions for 128 yards and a touchdown to go along with 51 rushing yards in the 13–10 road victory, earning NFC Offensive Player of the Week honors. In the game, Kamara also reached 3,000 receiving yards in his career, becoming the fastest player in NFL history to reach 3,000 yards in both receiving and rushing. The previous record was 70 games, held by Roger Craig, while Kamara achieved the feat in 66 games. In Week 14 against the Jets, after missing the previous four games due to injury, Kamara returned with 27 carries for 120 yards and a touchdown to go along with four receptions for 25 yards during the 30–9 victory. He closed out the regular season with 30 carries for 146 yards in a 30–20 victory over the Falcons.

Kamara finished the 2021 season with 240 carries for 898 yards and four touchdowns to go along with 47 receptions for 439 yards and five touchdowns. He earned his fifth Pro Bowl nomination, becoming the first player in franchise history to be named to the Pro Bowl in each of their first five seasons. Kamara was ranked 51st by his fellow players on the NFL Top 100 Players of 2022.

=== 2022 season ===
During Week 5 against the Seahawks, Kamara had 103 rushing yards and 91 receiving yards in the 39–32 victory. In Weeks 6 and 7, he recorded over 100 scrimmage yards in both games against the Bengals and Arizona Cardinals. During Week 8 against the Raiders, Kamara had 158 scrimmage yards and three total touchdowns in the 24–0 shutout victory. In three of the last four games of the season, he totaled over 100 scrimmage yards.

Kamara finished the 2022 season with 223 carries for 897 yards and two touchdowns to go along with 57 receptions for 490 yards and two touchdowns in 15 games and 13 starts.

=== 2023 season ===
On August 4, 2023, Kamara was suspended for three games due to violating the league's personal conduct policy, which stemmed from his involvement in a physical altercation dating back to February 2022.

On September 25, Kamara finished his suspension and was able to prepare for the Saints' upcoming game against the Buccaneers. In his first game back, Kamara had 13 receptions for 33 yards, setting an NFL record for the fewest receiving yards with at least 13 receptions. On October 8, Kamara scored a two-yard rushing touchdown against the Patriots. In doing so, he scored his 73rd career touchdown, passing Marques Colston to become the Saints' all-time touchdown leader. In Week 8 against the Colts, he had a rushing touchdown and receiving touchdown in the victory. He became the first player in franchise history to record 10,000 all-purpose yards. In Week 10 against the Vikings, Kamara recorded two two-point conversions, which tied Marshall Faulk for the most career two-point conversions with seven. In Week 13 against the Lions, he had two rushing touchdowns in the loss. He passed Mark Ingram for the most rushing touchdowns and Colston for the most scrimmage yards in franchise history.

In 2023, Kamara appeared in 13 games and started 12. He had six games on the season going over 100 scrimmage yards. He finished with 180 carries for 694 yards and five touchdowns to go with 75 receptions for 466 yards and a touchdown.

=== 2024 season ===
In Week 2, Kamara totaled 180 scrimmage yards, including 115 rushing yards and three touchdowns and 65 receiving yards and a touchdown in a 44–19 victory over the Dallas Cowboys, earning NFC Offensive Player of the Week honors. On October 22, 2024, he signed a two-year, $24.5 million contract extension.

In Week 9 against the Carolina Panthers, Kamara had 29 carries for 155 yards and six receptions for 60 yards. In Week 10, against the Falcons, he passed Mark Ingram for the most rushing yards in franchise history. In Week 15 against the Washington Commanders, he was part of a trick play that saw him score a touchdown on a 21-yard reception from Cedrick Wilson Jr. Kamara missed the last three games of the season with a groin injury.

Kamara finished the 2024 season with 228 carries for 950 yards and six touchdowns to go along with 68 receptions for 543 yards and two touchdowns in 14 games and starts.

=== 2025 season ===
Kamara had two games in the 2025 season with over 100 scrimmage yards: Week 2 against the San Francisco 49ers and Week 10 against the Carolina Panthers. He missed the final six games of the season due to a MCL sprain suffered in Week 12 against the Atlanta Falcons. Kamara finished the year with 131 carries for 471 yards and one touchdown, paired with 33 receptions for 186 yards across 11 total appearances.

== Career statistics ==
Legend
	Led the league
**Bold**	Career high

=== NFL ===
==== Regular season ====
Year	Team	Games		Rushing					Receiving					Returning					Fumbles	
Year	Team	GP	GS	Att	Yds	Avg	Lng	TD	Rec	Yds	Avg	Lng	TD	Ret	Yds	Avg	Lng	TD	Fum	Lost
2017	NO	16	3	120	728	**6.1**	**74T**	8	81	**826**	**10.2**	40	**5**	11	**347**	**31.5**	**106T**	**1**	1	1
2018	NO	15	13	194	883	4.6	49T	14	81	709	8.8	42	4	**16**	208	13.0	50	0	1	0
2019	NO	14	9	171	797	4.7	40T	5	81	533	6.6	41	1	4	30	7.5	27	0	**4**	1
2020	NO	15	10	187	932	5.0	49	**16**	**83**	756	9.1	52T	**5**	3	44	14.7	31	0	1	0
2021	NO	13	10	**240**	898	3.7	30	4	47	439	9.3	31	**5**	3	29	9.7	14	0	0	0
2022	NO	15	13	223	897	4.0	27	2	57	490	8.6	54	2	0	0	0.0	0	0	**4**	**4**
2023	NO	13	12	180	694	3.9	17	5	75	466	6.2	25	1	0	0	0.0	0	0	0	0
2024	NO	14	14	228	**950**	4.2	24	6	68	543	8.0	**57**	2	0	0	0.0	0	0	1	0
2025	NO	11	11	131	471	3.6	18T	1	33	186	5.6	26	0	0	0	0.0	0	0	2	2
2026	NO	8	4	49	161	3.3	15	3	28	160	5.07	31	2	0	0	0.0	0	0	0	0
Career		134	99	1,723	7,411	4.3	74T	64	634	5,108	8.1	57	27	37	658	17.8	106T	1	14	8

==== Postseason ====
Year	Team	Games		Rushing					Receiving					Returning					Fumbles	
Year	Team	GP	GS	Att	Yds	Avg	Lng	TD	Rec	Yds	Avg	Lng	TD	Ret	Yds	Avg	Lng	TD	Fum	Lost
2017	NO	2	1	21	66	3.1	10	**1**	5	72	**14.4**	**23**	**1**	2	50	25.0	30	0	0	0
2018	NO	2	1	24	86	3.6	15	0	**15**	**131**	8.7	**23**	0	**6**	**164**	**27.3**	**34**	0	0	0
2019	NO	1	1	7	21	3.0	5	**1**	8	34	4.3	9	0	0	0	0.0	0	0	0	0
2020	NO	2	1	**41**	**184**	**4.5**	**25**	**1**	5	37	7.4	10	0	0	0	0.0	0	0	0	0
Total		7	4	93	357	3.8	25	3	33	274	8.3	23	1	8	214	26.8	34	0	0	0

=== College ===
Season	Team	GP	Rushing				Receiving			
Season	Team	GP	Att	Yds	Avg	TD	Rec	Yds	Avg	TD
2015	Tennessee	13	**107**	**698**	**6.5**	7	34	291	8.6	3
2016	Tennessee	11	103	596	5.8	**9**	**40**	**392**	**9.8**	**4**
Total		24	210	1,294	6.2	16	74	683	9.2	7

== Career highlights ==
=== Awards and honors ===
- NFL Offensive Rookie of the Year (2017)
- 2× Second-team All-Pro (2017 (Note: Selected as the flex), 2020)
- 5× Pro Bowl (2017–2021)
- PFWA All-Rookie Team (2017)
- Yards after catch leader: (2020)
- 5× NFL Top 100 — 20th (2018), 14th (2019), 42nd (2020), 14th (2021), 51st (2022)

=== Records ===
==== NFL records ====
- Most rushing touchdowns in a game: 6 (tied with Ernie Nevers)
- Most successful two-point conversion attempts: 7 (tied with Marshall Faulk, Saquon Barkley and Zach Ertz)

==== New Orleans Saints records ====
As of the 2025 NFL season:

- Most career rushing yards: 7,250
- Most career rushing attempts: 1,674
- Most career rushing touchdowns: 61
- Most rushing touchdowns in one season: 16 (2020)
- Most receptions by a running back: 606
- Most receiving yards by a running back: 4,948
- Most receiving touchdowns by a running back: 25
- Most points scored by a non-kicker, career: 536
- Most points scored by a non-kicker, single season: 126 (2020)

== Personal life ==
=== Business ventures ===
Kamara owns the Big Squeezy, a Louisiana-based juice and smoothie chain with locations in Baton Rouge, Hammond, Mandeville and New Orleans. In February 2021, the chain sponsored NASCAR Xfinity Series driver Ryan Vargas and his No. 6 JD Motorsports car in the Super Start Batteries 188 at the Daytona International Speedway Road Course.

On June 20, 2021, NASCAR named Kamara as the Growth and Engagement Advisor. He became interested in the sport the previous year when NASCAR and its drivers participated in racial justice activism such as the sanctioning body's ban of the Confederate battle flag from race tracks and Bubba Wallace's Black Lives Matter-themed car.

=== Legal issues ===
On February 6, 2022, following the Pro Bowl in Las Vegas, Kamara was arrested and booked into the Clark County Detention Center for battery resulting in substantial bodily harm. The incident took place at a local nightclub the night prior. Video surveillance shows Kamara punching a man about eight times. In the aftermath, Kamara was ordered to pay $105,196.17 in restitution to cover the medical expenses of his victim. Kamara was also fined $500 and required to serve 30 hours of community service. In response on August 4, 2023, the NFL suspended Kamara for three games.
