= 2019 Atlanta Falcons season =

54th season in franchise history

- Owner: Arthur Blank
- General manager: Thomas Dimitroff
- Head coach: Dan Quinn
- Home stadium: Mercedes-Benz Stadium

Results
- Record: 7–9
- Division place: 2nd NFC South
- Playoffs: Did not qualify
- All-Pros: WR Julio Jones (2nd team); DT Grady Jarrett (2nd team)
- Pro Bowlers: DT Grady Jarrett; WR Julio Jones; TE Austin Hooper (alternate)

Uniform
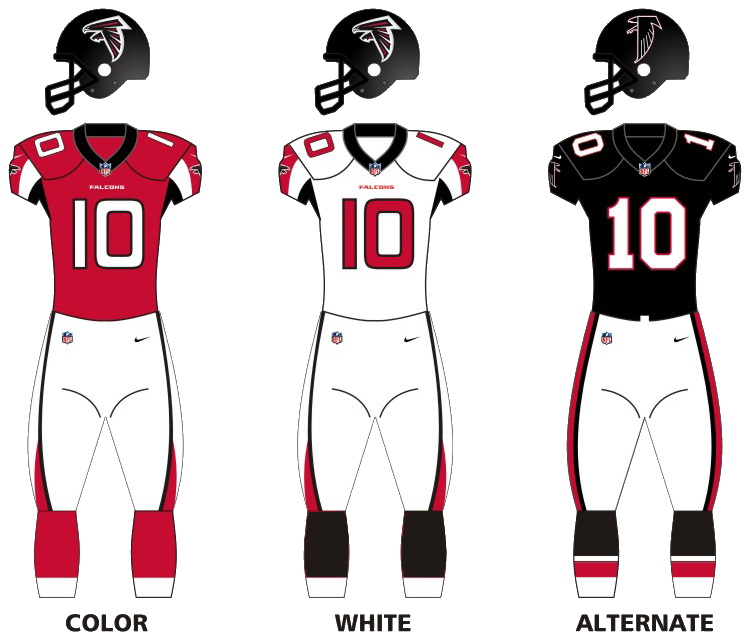

The 2019 season was the Atlanta Falcons' 54th in the National Football League (NFL), their third playing their home games at Mercedes-Benz Stadium and their fifth under and final full season under head coach Dan Quinn, as he would be fired during their next season. They tried to improve on their 7–9 season from 2018, and return to the playoffs for the first time since 2017. However, the Falcons stumbled out of the gate and had their worst start for the first time in 16 years with a 1–7 record to begin the campaign.

After a loss at home to the rival New Orleans Saints, the Falcons suffered their second consecutive losing season and were mathematically eliminated from playoff contention for the second year in a row. However, the Falcons went 6–2 over the final half of the season, tied for the best record in the NFC during that span, to finish the season with a 7–9 record for the second straight year and 2nd in the NFC South.

In their season finale against the Tampa Bay Buccaneers, the Falcons finished the game with a pick-six seven seconds into overtime by Deion Jones, setting the record for the shortest overtime in NFL history.

== NFL draft ==
2019 Atlanta Falcons draft
Round	Pick	Player	Position	College	Notes
1	14	Chris Lindstrom *	G	Boston College	
1	31	Kaleb McGary	OT	Washington	from LA Rams
4	111	Kendall Sheffield	CB	Ohio State	from DET
4	135	John Cominsky	DE	Charleston	from OAK
5	152	Qadree Ollison	RB	Pittsburgh	
5	172	Jordan Miller	CB	Washington	
6	203	Marcus Green	WR	Louisiana–Monroe	from LA Rams
Made roster † Pro Football Hall of Fame * Made at least one Pro Bowl during career

Notes

- As the result of a negative differential of free agent signings and departures that the Falcons experienced during the 2018 free agency period, the team received two compensatory selections for the 2019 draft.

Trades

- The Falcons traded their second-round (45th overall) and third-round (79th overall) picks to the Los Angeles Rams in exchange for their first-round (31st overall) and sixth-round (203rd overall) selections.
- The Falcons traded their fourth-round (117th overall) and sixth-round (186th overall) selection to the Detroit Lions in exchange for their fourth-round (111th overall) selection.
- The Falcons traded their fourth-round (137th overall) and seventh-round (230th overall) selection to the Oakland Raiders in exchange for their fourth-round (135th overall) selection.

== Staff ==
2019 Atlanta Falcons staff
Front office: Owner/chairman – Arthur Blank; President/CEO – Rich McKay; General manager – Thomas Dimitroff; Director of pro personnel – Joel Collier; Director of football operations – Nick Polk; Director of college scouting – Steve Sabo; National scouts – Ruston Webster and Phil Emery; Head coaches: Head coach – Dan Quinn; Assistant head coach/offensive passing game coordinator/wide receivers – Raheem Morris; Assistant to the head coach – Steve Scarnecchia; Offensive coaches: Offensive coordinator – Dirk Koetter; Quarterbacks – Greg Knapp; Running backs – Dave Brock; Tight ends – Mike Mularkey; Offensive line – Chris Morgan; Offensive line assistant – Bob Kronenberg; Offensive assistant – Will Harriger; Offensive assistant – Ben Steele	Defensive coaches: Defensive line – Jess Simpson; Assistant defensive line – Travis Jones; Linebackers – Jeff Ulbrich; Defensive passing game coordinator/secondary – Jerome Henderson; Defensive backs – Doug Mallory; Senior assistant - Bob Sutton; Defensive assistant - Aden Durde; Defensive assistant - Chad Walker; Special teams coaches: Special teams coordinator – Ben Kotwica; Assistant special teams – Mayur Chaudhari; Assistant special teams/offensive assistant – Bernie Parmalee; Strength and conditioning: Head strength and conditioning – Jesse Ackerman; Assistant strength and conditioning – Jonas Beauchemin; Assistant strength – Brandon Ireland

== Final roster ==
2019 Atlanta Falcons roster
Quarterbacks (QB): 2 Matt Ryan; 8 Matt Schaub; Running backs (RB): 38 Kenjon Barner; 24 Devonta Freeman; 23 Brian Hill; 30 Qadree Ollison; 40 Keith Smith FB; Wide receivers (WR): 13 Christian Blake; 83 Russell Gage; 14 Justin Hardy; 11 Julio Jones; 15 Brandon Powell; 17 Olamide Zaccheaus; Tight ends (TE): 87 Jaeden Graham; 81 Austin Hooper; 80 Luke Stocker	Offensive linemen (OL): 68 Jamon Brown G; 73 Matt Gono T; 64 Sean Harlow G; 63 Chris Lindstrom G; 51 Alex Mack C; 70 Jake Matthews T; 76 Kaleb McGary T; 74 Ty Sambrailo T; 71 Wes Schweitzer G; 75 John Wetzel T; Defensive linemen (DL): 93 Allen Bailey DE; 44 Vic Beasley DE; 99 Adrian Clayborn DE; 50 John Cominsky DE; 95 Jack Crawford DT; 96 Tyeler Davison DT; 97 Grady Jarrett DT; 55 Austin Larkin DE; 94 Deadrin Senat DT; 91 Jacob Tuioti-Mariner DT	Linebackers (LB): 59 De'Vondre Campbell OLB; 45 Deion Jones MLB; 54 Foyesade Oluokun OLB; 52 Ahmad Thomas OLB; Defensive backs (DB): 37 Ricardo Allen FS; 35 Jamal Carter SS; 34 Chris Cooper FS; 36 Kemal Ishmael SS; 27 Damontae Kazee SS; 41 Sharrod Neasman FS; 26 Isaiah Oliver CB; 20 Kendall Sheffield CB; 43 Jamar Taylor CB; 33 Blidi Wreh-Wilson CB; Special teams (ST): 9 Ryan Allen P; 47 Josh Harris LS; 7 Younghoe Koo K	Practice squad: 16 Danny Etling QB; 19 Devin Gray WR; 66 Lukayus McNeil T; 85 Carson Meier TE; 59 Carroll Phillips DE; 53 Quentin Poling LB; 39 C. J. Reavis CB; 42 Craig Reynolds RB; 12 Tavonn Salter WR; Reserve: 6 Kurt Benkert QB (IR); -- Michael Bennett DT (IR); 5 Matt Bosher P (IR); 77 James Carpenter G (IR); 32 Johnathan Cyprien SS (IR); 89 Alex Gray TE (IR); 90 Ra'Shede Hageman DT (IR); 98 Takkarist McKinley DE (IR); 56 Steven Means DE (IR); 28 Jordan Miller CB (Susp.); 22 Keanu Neal SS (IR); 18 Calvin Ridley WR (IR); 9 Matt Simms QB (IR); 25 Ito Smith RB (IR); 21 Desmond Trufant CB (IR); 29 J. J. Wilcox SS (IR); Rookies in italics 53 active, 16 reserve, 9 practice squad

== Preseason ==
The Falcons played the Denver Broncos in the Pro Football Hall of Fame Game on Thursday, August 1, at Tom Benson Hall of Fame Stadium in Canton, Ohio. The Falcons were represented by tight end Tony Gonzalez, who spent the final five seasons of his career with the Falcons from 2009–2013.

Week	Date	Opponent	Result	Record	Venue	Recap
HOF	August 1	vs. Denver Broncos	L 10–14	0–1	Tom Benson Hall of Fame Stadium	Recap
1	August 8	at Miami Dolphins	L 27–34	0–2	Hard Rock Stadium	Recap
2	August 15	New York Jets	L 10–22	0–3	Mercedes-Benz Stadium	Recap
3	August 22	Washington Redskins	L 7–19	0–4	Mercedes-Benz Stadium	Recap
4	August 29	at Jacksonville Jaguars	W 31–12	1–4	TIAA Bank Field	Recap

== Regular season ==
=== Schedule ===
Week	Date	Opponent	Result	Record	Venue	Recap
1	September 8	at Minnesota Vikings	**L** 12–28	0–1	U.S. Bank Stadium	Recap
2	September 15	Philadelphia Eagles	**W** 24–20	1–1	Mercedes-Benz Stadium	Recap
3	September 22	at Indianapolis Colts	**L** 24–27	1–2	Lucas Oil Stadium	Recap
4	September 29	Tennessee Titans	**L** 10–24	1–3	Mercedes-Benz Stadium	Recap
5	October 6	at Houston Texans	**L** 32–53	1–4	NRG Stadium	Recap
6	October 13	at Arizona Cardinals	**L** 33–34	1–5	State Farm Stadium	Recap
7	October 20	Los Angeles Rams	**L** 10–37	1–6	Mercedes-Benz Stadium	Recap
8	October 27	Seattle Seahawks	**L** 20–27	1–7	Mercedes-Benz Stadium	Recap
9	Bye					
10	November 10	at **New Orleans Saints**	**W** 26–9	2–7	Mercedes-Benz Superdome	Recap
11	November 17	at **Carolina Panthers**	**W** 29–3	3–7	Bank of America Stadium	Recap
12	November 24	**Tampa Bay Buccaneers**	**L** 22–35	3–8	Mercedes-Benz Stadium	Recap
13	November 28	**New Orleans Saints**	**L** 18–26	3–9	Mercedes-Benz Stadium	Recap
14	December 8	**Carolina Panthers**	**W** 40–20	4–9	Mercedes-Benz Stadium	Recap
15	December 15	at San Francisco 49ers	**W** 29–22	5–9	Levi's Stadium	Recap
16	December 22	Jacksonville Jaguars	**W** 24–12	6–9	Mercedes-Benz Stadium	Recap
17	December 29	at **Tampa Bay Buccaneers**	**W** 28–22 (OT)	7–9	Raymond James Stadium	Recap

Note: Intra-division opponents are in bold text.

=== Game summaries ===
==== Week 1: at Minnesota Vikings ====
Week One: Atlanta Falcons at Minnesota Vikings – Game summary

Quarter	1	2	3	4	Total
Falcons	0	0	0	12	**12**
**Vikings**	14	7	7	0	**28**

at U.S. Bank Stadium, Minneapolis, Minnesota

- Date: September 8
- Game time: 1:00 p.m. EDT/12:00 p.m. CDT
- Game weather: None (indoor stadium)
- Game attendance: 66,714
- Referee: Bill Vinovich
- TV announcers (Fox): Thom Brennaman, Chris Spielman, and Shannon Spake
- Recap, Game Book

Game information

**First quarter**

- MIN – Adam Thielen 23-yard pass from Kirk Cousins (Dan Bailey kick), 11:50. Vikings 7–0. **Drive: 2 plays, 21 yards, 1:03.**
- MIN – Dalvin Cook 19-yard run (Dan Bailey kick), 8:22. Vikings 14–0. **Drive: 4 plays, 41 yards, 1:33.**

**Second quarter**

- MIN – Kirk Cousins 1-yard run (Dan Bailey kick), 4:40. Vikings 21–0. **Drive: 10 plays, 79 yards, 5:41.**

**Third quarter**

- MIN – Dalvin Cook 7-yard run (Dan Bailey kick), 0:29. Vikings 28–0. **Drive: 6 plays, 80 yards, 2:39.**

**Fourth quarter**

- ATL – Calvin Ridley 20-yard pass from Matt Ryan (pass failed), 9:19. Vikings 28–6. **Drive: 8 plays, 66 yards, 3:16.**
- ATL – Julio Jones 2-yard pass from Matt Ryan (pass failed), 1:05. Vikings 28–12. **Drive: 12 plays, 71 yards, 3:23.**

**Top passers**

- ATL – Matt Ryan – 33/46, 304 yards, 2 TD, 2 INT
- MIN – Kirk Cousins – 8/10, 98 yards, TD

**Top rushers**

- ATL – Ito Smith – 6 rushes, 31 yards
- MIN – Dalvin Cook – 21 rushes, 111 yards, 2 TD

**Top receivers**

- ATL – Austin Hooper – 9 receptions, 77 yards
- MIN – Adam Thielen – 3 receptions, 43 yards, TD

==== Week 2: vs. Philadelphia Eagles ====
Week Two: Philadelphia Eagles at Atlanta Falcons – Game summary

Quarter	1	2	3	4	Total
Eagles	0	6	6	8	**20**
**Falcons**	3	7	7	7	**24**

at Mercedes-Benz Stadium, Atlanta, Georgia

- Date: September 15
- Game time: 8:20 p.m. EDT
- Game weather: Partly cloudy, 92 °F (33 °C) (retractable roof open)
- Game attendance: 72,443
- Referee: Brad Allen
- TV announcers (NBC): Al Michaels, Cris Collinsworth, Michele Tafoya, and Terry McAulay
- Recap, Game Book

Game information

**First quarter**

- ATL – Matt Bryant 50-yard field goal, 9:28. Falcons 3–0. **Drive: 11 plays, 43 yards, 5:32.**

**Second quarter**

- PHI – Jake Elliott 34-yard field goal, 10:45. Tied 3–3. **Drive: 9 plays, 27 yards, 4:45.**
- ATL – Calvin Ridley 34-yard pass from Matt Ryan (Matt Bryant kick), 4:56. Falcons 10–3. **Drive: 5 plays, 65 yards, 2:31.**
- PHI – Jake Elliott 41-yard field goal, 0:00. Falcons 10–6. **Drive: 8 plays, 18 yards, 0:43.**

**Third quarter**

- ATL – Julio Jones 4-yard pass from Matt Ryan (Matt Bryant kick), 13:23. Falcons 17–6. **Drive: 3 plays, 33 yards, 1:28.**
- PHI – Nelson Agholor 4-yard pass from Carson Wentz (run failed), 4:57. Falcons 17–12. **Drive: 6 plays, 27 yards, 3:08.**

**Fourth quarter**

- PHI – Carson Wentz 1-yard run (Carson Wentz–Zach Ertz pass), 3:13. Eagles 20–17. **Drive: 13 plays, 73 yards, 8:29.**
- ATL – Julio Jones 54-yard pass from Matt Ryan (Matt Bryant kick), 2:10. Falcons 24–20. **Drive: 6 plays, 75 yards, 1:03.**

**Top passers**

- PHI – Carson Wentz – 25/43, 231 yards, TD, 2 INT
- ATL – Matt Ryan – 27/43, 320 yards, 3 TD, 3 INT

**Top rushers**

- PHI – Miles Sanders – 10 rushes, 28 yards
- ATL – Ito Smith – 4 rushes, 32 yards

**Top receivers**

- PHI – Nelson Agholor – 8 receptions, 107 yards, TD
- ATL – Julio Jones – 8 receptions, 106 yards, 2 TD

==== Week 3: at Indianapolis Colts ====
Week Three: Atlanta Falcons at Indianapolis Colts – Game summary

Quarter	1	2	3	4	Total
Falcons	0	3	7	14	**24**
**Colts**	10	10	0	7	**27**

at Lucas Oil Stadium, Indianapolis, Indiana

- Date: September 22
- Game time: 1:00 p.m. EDT
- Game weather: None (retractable roof closed)
- Game attendance: 60,295
- Referee: Alex Kemp
- TV announcers (CBS): Andrew Catalon, James Lofton, and A. J. Ross
- Recap, Game Book

Game information

**First quarter**

- IND – Adam Vinatieri 49-yard field goal, 9:30. Colts 3–0. **Drive: 9 plays, 44 yards, 5:30.**
- IND – Zach Pascal 18-yard pass from Jacoby Brissett (Adam Vinatieri kick), 1:25. Colts 10–0. **Drive: 7 plays, 93 yards, 4:17.**

**Second quarter**

- IND – Adam Vinatieri 21-yard field goal, 5:51. Colts 13–0. **Drive: 15 plays, 94 yards, 8:20.**
- ATL – Matt Bryant 34-yard field goal, 2:20. Colts 13–3. **Drive: 9 plays, 59 yards, 3:31.**
- IND – T. Y. Hilton 4-yard pass from Jacoby Brissett (Adam Vinatieri kick), 0:09. Colts 20–3. **Drive: 10 plays, 64 yards, 2:11.**

**Third quarter**

- ATL – Austin Hooper 13-yard pass from Matt Ryan (Matt Bryant kick), 10:30. Colts 20–10. **Drive: 8 plays, 75 yards, 4:30.**

**Fourth quarter**

- ATL – Austin Hooper 2-yard pass from Matt Ryan (Matt Bryant kick), 13:51. Colts 20–17. **Drive: 16 plays, 78 yards, 9:56.**
- IND – Marlon Mack 4-yard run (Adam Vinatieri kick), 8:40. Colts 27–17. **Drive: 11 plays, 75 yards, 5:11.**
- ATL – Julio Jones 10-yard pass from Matt Ryan (Matt Bryant kick), 4:11. Colts 27–24. **Drive: 10 plays, 71 yards, 4:29.**

**Top passers**

- ATL – Matt Ryan – 29/34, 304 yards, 3 TD, INT
- IND – Jacoby Brissett – 28/37, 310 yards, 2 TD

**Top rushers**

- ATL – Devonta Freeman – 16 rushes, 88 yards
- IND – Marlon Mack – 16 rushes, 74 yards, TD

**Top receivers**

- ATL – Julio Jones – 8 receptions, 128 yards, TD
- IND – T. Y. Hilton – 8 receptions, 65 yards, TD

==== Week 4: vs. Tennessee Titans ====
Week Four: Tennessee Titans at Atlanta Falcons – Game summary

Quarter	1	2	3	4	Total
**Titans**	14	10	0	0	**24**
Falcons	7	0	3	0	**10**

at Mercedes-Benz Stadium, Atlanta, Georgia

- Date: September 29
- Game time: 1:00 p.m. EDT
- Game weather: None (retractable roof closed)
- Game attendance: 72,108
- Referee: John Hussey
- TV announcers (CBS): Spero Dedes, Adam Archuleta, and A.J. Ross
- Recap, Game Book

Game information

**First quarter**

- TEN – A. J. Brown 55-yard pass from Marcus Mariota (Cairo Santos kick), 11:57. Titans 7–0. **Drive: 1 play, 55 yards, 0:12.**
- ATL – Ito Smith 1-yard run (Matt Bryant kick), 8:30. Tied 7–7. **Drive: 6 plays, 85 yards, 3:27.**
- TEN – A. J. Brown 11-yard pass from Marcus Mariota (Cairo Santos kick), 2:26. Titans 14–7. **Drive: 13 plays, 75 yards, 6:04.**

**Second quarter**

- TEN – Cairo Santos 45-yard field goal, 10:03. Titans 17–7. **Drive: 5 plays, 35 yards, 2:09.**
- TEN – Corey Davis 23-yard pass from Marcus Mariota (Cairo Santos kick), 2:23. Titans 24–7. **Drive: 6 plays, 60 yards, 3:27.**

**Third quarter**

- ATL – Matt Bryant 42-yard field goal, 11:39. Titans 24–10. **Drive: 10 plays, 51 yards, 3:21.**

**Fourth quarter**

- No scoring plays.

**Top passers**

- TEN – Marcus Mariota – 18/27, 227 yards, 3 TD
- ATL – Matt Ryan – 35/53, 397 yards

**Top rushers**

- TEN – Derrick Henry – 27 rushes, 100 yards
- ATL – Devonta Freeman – 12 rushes, 28 yards

**Top receivers**

- TEN – A. J. Brown – 3 receptions, 94 yards, 2 TD
- ATL – Austin Hooper – 9 receptions, 130 yards

==== Week 5: at Houston Texans ====
Week Five: Atlanta Falcons at Houston Texans – Game summary

Quarter	1	2	3	4	Total
Falcons	7	10	0	15	**32**
**Texans**	7	9	17	20	**53**

at NRG Stadium, Houston, Texas

- Date: October 6
- Game time: 1:00 p.m. EDT/12:00 p.m. CDT
- Game weather: None (retractable roof closed)
- Game attendance: 71,787
- Referee: Shawn Smith
- TV announcers (Fox): Kenny Albert, Ronde Barber, and Sara Walsh
- Recap, Game Book

Game information

**First quarter**

- ATL – Mohamed Sanu 14-yard pass from Matt Ryan (Matt Bryant kick), 9:03. Falcons 7–0. **Drive: 6 plays, 66 yards, 2:35.**
- HOU – Will Fuller 6-yard pass from Deshaun Watson (Kaʻimi Fairbairn kick), 4:09. Tied 7–7. **Drive: 11 plays, 75 yards, 4:54.**

**Second quarter**

- ATL – Matt Bryant 35-yard field goal, 14:52. Falcons 10–7. **Drive: 10 plays, 57 yards, 4:17.**
- HOU – Will Fuller 33-yard pass from Deshaun Watson (kick failed, wide left), 12:06. Texans 13–10. **Drive: 6 plays, 60 yards, 2:46.**
- HOU – Kaʻimi Fairbairn 50-yard field goal, 4:02. Texans 16–10. **Drive: 10 plays, 60 yards, 5:08.**
- ATL – Devonta Freeman 9-yard pass from Matt Ryan (Matt Bryant kick), 0:22. Falcons 17–16. **Drive: 11 plays, 82 yards, 3:40.**

**Third quarter**

- HOU – Carlos Hyde 1-yard run (Kaʻimi Fairbairn kick), 11:51. Texans 23–17. **Drive: 7 plays, 75 yards, 3:09.**
- HOU – Kaʻimi Fairbairn 26-yard field goal, 7:37. Texans 26–17. **Drive: 7 plays, 59 yards, 2:29.**
- HOU – Darren Fells 8-yard pass from Deshaun Watson (Kaʻimi Fairbairn kick), 1:58. Texans 33–17. **Drive: 6 plays, 88 yards, 3:46.**

**Fourth quarter**

- ATL – Matt Ryan 1-yard run (Matt Ryan–Austin Hooper pass), 11:24. Texans 33–25. **Drive: 7 plays, 16 yards, 3:25.**
- HOU – Darren Fells 12-yard pass from Deshaun Watson (Kaʻimi Fairbairn kick), 6:24. Texans 40–25. **Drive: 9 plays, 81 yards, 5:00.**
- ATL – Calvin Ridley 29-yard pass from Matt Ryan (Matt Bryant kick), 3:22. Texans 40–32. **Drive: 8 plays, 75 yards, 3:02.**
- HOU – Will Fuller 44-yard pass from Deshaun Watson (Kaʻimi Fairbairn kick), 1:51. Texans 47–32. **Drive: 6 plays, 60 yards, 1:31.**
- HOU – Tashaun Gipson 79-yard interception return (kick failed, wide left), 0:24. Texans 53–32.

**Top passers**

- ATL – Matt Ryan – 32/46, 330 yards, 3 TD, INT
- HOU – Deshaun Watson – 28/33, 426 yards, 5 TD

**Top rushers**

- ATL – Devonta Freeman – 11 rushes, 30 yards
- HOU – Carlos Hyde – 21 rushes, 60 yards, TD

**Top receivers**

- ATL – Calvin Ridley – 5 receptions, 88 yards, TD
- HOU – Will Fuller – 14 receptions, 217 yards, 3 TD

==== Week 6: at Arizona Cardinals ====
Week Six: Atlanta Falcons at Arizona Cardinals – Game summary

Quarter	1	2	3	4	Total
Falcons	7	3	10	13	**33**
**Cardinals**	3	17	7	7	**34**

at State Farm Stadium, Glendale, Arizona

- Date: October 13
- Game time: 4:05 p.m. EDT/1:05 p.m. MST
- Game weather: None (retractable roof closed)
- Game attendance: 60,140
- Referee: Carl Cheffers
- TV announcers (Fox): Thom Brennaman, Chris Spielman, and Megan Olivi
- Recap, Game Book

Game information

**First quarter**

- ATL – Calvin Ridley 9-yard pass from Matt Ryan (Matt Bryant kick), 9:23. Falcons 7–0. **Drive: 10 plays, 80 yards, 5:37.**
- ARI – Zane Gonzalez 39-yard field goal, 5:41. Falcons 7–3. **Drive: 9 plays, 57 yards, 3:42.**

**Second quarter**

- ARI – Chase Edmonds 2-yard pass from Kyler Murray (Zane Gonzalez kick), 13:02. Cardinals 10–7. **Drive: 9 plays, 86 yards, 4:52.**
- ARI – David Johnson 1-yard run (Zane Gonzalez kick), 9:02. Cardinals 17–7. **Drive: 4 plays, 79 yards, 1:52.**
- ATL – Matt Bryant 29-yard field goal, 3:37. Cardinals 17–10. **Drive: 11 plays, 64 yards, 5:25.**
- ARI – Zane Gonzalez 22-yard field goal, 0:04. Cardinals 20–10. **Drive: 15 plays, 71 yards, 3:33.**

**Third quarter**

- ARI – Maxx Williams 20-yard pass from Kyler Murray (Zane Gonzalez kick), 11:25. Cardinals 27–10. **Drive: 9 plays, 64 yards, 3:35.**
- ATL – Matt Bryant 44-yard field goal, 7:46. Cardinals 27–13. **Drive: 8 plays, 49 yards, 3:39.**
- ATL – Devonta Freeman 7-yard pass from Matt Ryan (Matt Bryant kick), 1:02. Cardinals 27–20. **Drive: 10 plays, 93 yards, 4:34.**

**Fourth quarter**

- ATL – Austin Hooper 6-yard pass from Matt Ryan (Matt Bryant kick), 10:50. Tied 27–27. **Drive: 8 plays, 83 yards, 3:12.**
- ARI – David Johnson 14-yard pass from Kyler Murray (Zane Gonzalez kick), 5:12. Cardinals 34–27. **Drive: 5 plays, 45 yards, 2:00.**
- ATL – Devonta Freeman 12-yard pass from Matt Ryan (kick failed, wide left), 1:53. Cardinals 34–33. **Drive: 7 plays, 75 yards, 3:19.**

**Top passers**

- ATL – Matt Ryan – 30/36, 356 yards, 4 TD
- ARI – Kyler Murray – 27/37, 340 yards, 3 TD

**Top rushers**

- ATL – Devonta Freeman – 19 rushes, 88 yards
- ARI – David Johnson – 12 rushes, 34 yards, TD

**Top receivers**

- ATL – Austin Hooper – 8 receptions, 117 yards, TD
- ARI – Larry Fitzgerald – 6 receptions, 69 yards

==== Week 7: vs. Los Angeles Rams ====
Week Seven: Los Angeles Rams at Atlanta Falcons – Game summary

Quarter	1	2	3	4	Total
**Rams**	3	10	14	10	**37**
Falcons	3	0	0	7	**10**

at Mercedes-Benz Stadium, Atlanta, Georgia

- Date: October 20
- Game time: 1:00 p.m. EDT
- Game weather: Partly Cloudy (retractable roof open)
- Game attendance: 71,856
- Referee: Ronald Torbert
- TV announcers (Fox): Sam Rosen, Charles Davis, and Pam Oliver
- Recap, Game Book

Game information

**First quarter**

- ATL – Matt Bryant 52-yard field goal, 11:23. Falcons 3–0. **Drive: 9 plays, 33 yards, 3:37.**
- LAR – Greg Zuerlein 55-yard field goal, 1:42. Tied 3–3. **Drive: 5 plays, 20 yards, 1:24.**

**Second quarter**

- LAR – Todd Gurley 13-yard pass from Jared Goff (Greg Zuerlein kick), 11:16. Rams 10–3. **Drive: 9 plays, 84 yards, 3:44.**
- LAR – Greg Zuerlein 25-yard field goal, 1:56. Rams 13–3. **Drive: 11 plays, 70 yards, 4:51.**

**Third quarter**

- LAR – Gerald Everett 8-yard pass from Jared Goff (Greg Zuerlein kick), 10:35. Rams 20–3. **Drive: 9 plays, 75 yards, 4:25.**
- LAR – Jared Goff 1-yard run (Greg Zuerlein kick), 6:34. Rams 27–3. **Drive: 5 plays, 16 yards, 3:09.**

**Fourth quarter**

- LAR – Greg Zuerlein 20-yard field goal, 5:42. Rams 30–3. **Drive: 15 plays, 52 yards, 8:04.**
- ATL – Austin Hooper 10-yard pass from Matt Schaub (Matt Bryant kick), 2:36. Rams 30–10. **Drive: 8 plays, 75 yards, 3:06.**
- LAR – Darious Williams fumble recovery in end zone (Greg Zuerlein kick), 0:11. Rams 37–10.

**Top passers**

- LAR – Jared Goff – 22/37, 268 yards, 2 TD
- ATL – Matt Ryan – 16/27, 159 yards, INT

**Top rushers**

- LAR – Todd Gurley – 18 rushes, 41 yards
- ATL – Devonta Freeman – 7 rushes, 19 yards

**Top receivers**

- LAR – Robert Woods – 5 receptions, 80 yards
- ATL – Julio Jones – 6 receptions, 93 yards

==== Week 8: vs. Seattle Seahawks ====
Week Eight: Seattle Seahawks at Atlanta Falcons – Game summary

Quarter	1	2	3	4	Total
**Seahawks**	3	21	0	3	**27**
Falcons	0	0	11	9	**20**

at Mercedes-Benz Stadium, Atlanta, Georgia

- Date: October 27
- Game time: 1:00 p.m. EDT
- Game weather: Sunny, 65 °F (18 °C) (retractable roof open)
- Game attendance: 71,483
- Referee: Clete Blakeman
- TV announcers (Fox): Sam Rosen, Ronde Barber, and Sara Walsh
- Recap, Game Book

Game information

**First quarter**

- SEA – Jason Myers 42-yard field goal, 11:17. Seahawks 3–0. **Drive: 9 plays, 51 yards, 3:43.**

**Second quarter**

- SEA – DK Metcalf 4-yard pass from Russell Wilson (Jason Myers kick), 11:47. Seahawks 10–0. **Drive: 6 plays, 59 yards, 3:08.**
- SEA – Chris Carson 1-yard run (Jason Myers kick), 4:46. Seahawks 17–0. **Drive: 7 plays, 46 yards, 4:17.**
- SEA – DK Metcalf 2-yard pass from Russell Wilson (Jason Myers kick), 0:27. Seahawks 24–0. **Drive: 9 plays, 57 yards, 2:00.**

**Third quarter**

- ATL – Brian Hill 23-yard run (Matt Schaub-Calvin Ridley pass), 10:54. Seahawks 24–8. **Drive: 7 plays, 75 yards, 4:06.**
- ATL – Matt Bryant 47-yard field goal, 3:25. Seahawks 24–11. **Drive: 10 plays, 34 yards, 5:06.**

**Fourth quarter**

- SEA – Jason Myers 54-yard field goal, 5:53. Seahawks 27–11. **Drive: 10 plays, 58 yards, 6:50.**
- ATL – Austin Hooper 1-yard pass from Matt Schaub (pass failed), 3:08. Seahawks 27–17. **Drive: 11 plays, 75 yards, 2:45.**
- ATL – Matt Bryant 37-yard field goal, 1:17. Seahawks 27–20. **Drive: 8 plays, 67 yards, 1:24.**

**Top passers**

- SEA – Russell Wilson – 14/20, 182 yards, 2 TD
- ATL – Matt Schaub – 39/52, 460 yards, TD, INT

**Top rushers**

- SEA – Chris Carson – 20 rushes, 90 yards, TD
- ATL – Devonta Freeman – 13 rushes, 39 yards

**Top receivers**

- SEA – Tyler Lockett – 6 receptions, 100 yards
- ATL – Julio Jones – 10 receptions, 152 yards

==== Week 10: at New Orleans Saints ====
Week Ten: Atlanta Falcons at New Orleans Saints – Game summary

Quarter	1	2	3	4	Total
**Falcons**	3	10	0	13	**26**
Saints	3	3	3	0	**9**

at Mercedes-Benz Superdome, New Orleans, Louisiana

- Date: November 10
- Game time: 1:00 p.m. EST/12:00 p.m. CST
- Game weather: None (indoor stadium)
- Game attendance: 73,283
- Referee: Brad Allen
- TV announcers (Fox): Kevin Burkhardt, Charles Davis, and Pam Oliver
- Recap, Game Book

Game information

**First quarter**

- ATL – Younghoe Koo 37-yard field goal, 9:27. Falcons 3–0. **Drive: 10 plays, 56 yards, 5:33.**
- NO – Wil Lutz 29-yard field goal, 4:09. Tied 3–3. **Drive: 10 plays, 64 yards, 5:18.**

**Second quarter**

- ATL – Austin Hooper 8-yard pass from Matt Ryan (Younghoe Koo kick), 11:09. Falcons 10–3. **Drive: 17 plays, 75 yards, 8:00.**
- ATL – Younghoe Koo 36-yard field goal, 1:31. Falcons 13–3. **Drive: 8 plays, 65 yards, 1:17.**
- NO – Wil Lutz 47-yard field goal, 0:00. Falcons 13–6. **Drive: 9 plays, 46 yards, 1:31.**

**Third quarter**

- NO – Wil Lutz 28-yard field goal, 6:05. Falcons 13–9. **Drive: 9 plays, 28 yards, 3:19.**

**Fourth quarter**

- ATL – Brian Hill 10-yard pass from Matt Ryan (Younghoe Koo kick), 14:53. Falcons 20–9. **Drive: 13 plays, 75 yards, 6:12.**
- ATL – Younghoe Koo 48-yard field goal, 7:27. Falcons 23–9. **Drive: 11 plays, 37 yards, 5:04.**
- ATL – Younghoe Koo 30-yard field goal, 2:32. Falcons 26–9. **Drive: 4 plays, 6 yards, 1:01.**

**Top passers**

- ATL – Matt Ryan – 20/35, 182 yards, 2 TD, INT
- NO – Drew Brees – 32/45, 287 yards

**Top rushers**

- ATL – Brian Hill – 20 rushes, 61 yards
- NO – Alvin Kamara – 4 rushes, 24 yards

**Top receivers**

- ATL – Julio Jones – 3 receptions, 79 yards
- NO – Michael Thomas – 13 receptions, 152 yards

==== Week 11: at Carolina Panthers ====
Week Eleven: Atlanta Falcons at Carolina Panthers – Game summary

Quarter	1	2	3	4	Total
**Falcons**	10	10	6	3	**29**
Panthers	0	0	0	3	**3**

at Bank of America Stadium, Charlotte, North Carolina

- Date: November 17
- Game time: 1:00 p.m. EST
- Game weather: Partly cloudy, 51 °F (11 °C)
- Game attendance: 73,106
- Referee: Adrian Hill
- TV announcers (Fox): Dick Stockton, Mark Schlereth, and Jennifer Hale
- Recap, Game Book

Game information

**First quarter**

- ATL – Younghoe Koo 38-yard field goal, 11:39. Falcons 3–0. **Drive: 8 plays, 55 yards, 3:21.**
- ATL – Kenjon Barner 78-yard punt return (Younghoe Koo kick), 0:59. Falcons 10–0.

**Second quarter**

- ATL – Younghoe Koo 23-yard field goal, 5:42. Falcons 13–0. **Drive: 10 plays, 75 yards, 5:00.**
- ATL – Qadree Ollison 2-yard run (Younghoe Koo kick), 1:34. Falcons 20–0. **Drive: 7 plays, 71 yards, 1:23.**

**Third quarter**

- ATL – Calvin Ridley 6-yard pass from Matt Ryan (pass failed), 6:40. Falcons 26–0. **Drive: 10 plays, 53 yards, 4:52.**

**Fourth quarter**

- CAR – Joey Slye 31-yard field goal, 13:00. Falcons 26–3. **Drive: 12 plays, 78 yards, 4:49.**
- ATL – Younghoe Koo 29-yard field goal, 7:01. Falcons 29–3. **Drive: 12 plays, 64 yards, 5:59.**

**Top passers**

- ATL – Matt Ryan – 21/31, 311 yards, TD
- CAR – Kyle Allen – 31/50, 325 yards, 4 INT

**Top rushers**

- ATL – Brian Hill – 15 rushes, 30 yards
- CAR – Christian McCaffrey – 14 rushes, 70 yards

**Top receivers**

- ATL – Calvin Ridley – 8 receptions, 143 yards, TD
- CAR – Christian McCaffrey – 11 receptions, 121 yards

==== Week 12: vs. Tampa Bay Buccaneers ====
Week Twelve: Tampa Bay Buccaneers at Atlanta Falcons – Game summary

Quarter	1	2	3	4	Total
**Buccaneers**	7	12	6	10	**35**
Falcons	10	0	3	9	**22**

at Mercedes-Benz Stadium, Atlanta, Georgia

- Date: November 24
- Game time: 1:00 p.m. EST
- Game weather: None (retractable roof closed)
- Game attendance: 71,463
- Referee: Clay Martin
- TV announcers (Fox): Dick Stockton, Mark Schlereth, and Jennifer Hale
- Recap, Game Book

Game information

- ATL – Younghoe Koo 25-yard field goal, 12:47. Falcons 3–0. **Drive: 7 plays, 68 yards, 2:13.**
- TB – Chris Godwin 71-yard pass from Jameis Winston (Matt Gay kick), 6:45. Buccaneers 7–3. **Drive: 5 plays, 97 yards, 2:37.**
- ATL – Qadree Ollison 1-yard run (Younghoe Koo kick), 0:46. Falcons 10–7. **Drive: 6 plays, 19 yards, 2:31.**

**Second quarter**

- TB – Chris Godwin 1-yard pass from Jameis Winston (kick failed, wide left), 7:51. Buccaneers 13–10. **Drive: 6 plays, 51 yards, 3:31.**
- TB – Vita Vea 1-yard pass from Jameis Winston (kick failed, wide left), 0:40. Buccaneers 19–10. **Drive: 11 plays, 95 yards, 4:04.**

**Third quarter**

- TB – Ronald Jones 4-yard run (kick blocked), 10:58. Buccaneers 25–10. **Drive: 9 plays, 75 yards, 4:02.**
- ATL – Younghoe Koo 40-yard field goal, 1:40. Buccaneers 25–13. **Drive: 13 plays, 34 yards, 5:56.**
- TB – Matt Gay 32-yard field goal, 12:58. Buccaneers 28–13. **Drive: 8 plays, 61 yards, 3:52.**

**Fourth quarter**

- ATL – Younghoe Koo 38-yard field goal, 8:12. Buccaneers 28–16. **Drive: 13 plays, 55 yards, 4:36.**
- TB – Ndamukong Suh 6-yard fumble run (Matt Gay kick), 3:06. Buccaneers 35–16.
- ATL – Calvin Ridley 21-yard pass from Matt Schaub (pass failed), 1:50. Buccaneers 35–22. **Drive: 9 plays, 75 yards, 1:16.**
- TB – Jameis Winston – 18/28, 313 yards, 3 TD, 2 INT
- ATL – Matt Ryan – 23/46, 271 yards, INT

**Top rushers**

- TB – Ronald Jones – 12 rushes, 51 yards, TD
- ATL – Qadree Ollison – 8 rushes, 20 yards, TD

**Top receivers**

- TB – Chris Godwin – 7 receptions, 184 yards, 2 TD
- ATL – Calvin Ridley – 6 receptions, 85 yards, TD

==== Week 13: vs. New Orleans Saints ====
Thanksgiving Day Games

Week Thirteen: New Orleans Saints at Atlanta Falcons – Game summary

Quarter	1	2	3	4	Total
**Saints**	7	10	3	6	**26**
Falcons	0	9	0	9	**18**

at Mercedes-Benz Stadium, Atlanta, Georgia

- Date: November 28
- Game time: 8:20 p.m. EST
- Game weather: None (retractable roof closed)
- Game attendance: 71,993
- Referee: Shawn Smith
- TV announcers (NBC): Mike Tirico, Tony Dungy, Rodney Harrison, Michele Tafoya, and Terry McAulay
- Recap, Game Book

Game information

**First quarter**

- NO - Taysom Hill 3-yard pass from Drew Brees (Wil Lutz kick), 11:07. Saints 7-0. **Drive: 4 plays, 30 yards, 1:56.**

**Second quarter**

- ATL - Jaeden Graham 18-yard pass from Matt Ryan (kick failed), 12:35. Saints 7-6. **Drive: 3 plays, 55 yards, 0:56.**
- NO - Wil Lutz 22-yard field goal, 9:05. Saints 10-6. **Drive: 8 plays, 77 yards, 3:30.**
- NO - Taysom Hill 30-yard run (Wil Lutz kick), 1:53. Saints 17-6. **Drive: 4 plays, 68 yards, 2:04.**
- ATL - Younghoe Koo 45-yard field goal, 0:03. Saints 17-9. **Drive: 9 plays, 48 yards, 1:50.**

**Third quarter**

- NO - Wil Lutz 47-yard field goal, 5:54. Saints 20-9. **Drive: 10 plays, 51 yards, 4:48.**

**Fourth quarter**

- NO - Wil Lutz 42-yard field goal, 10:14. Saints 23-9. **Drive: 4 plays, 5 yards, 1:31.**
- NO - Wil Lutz 45-yard field goal, 6:27. Saints 26-9. **Drive: 6 plays, 12 yards, 2:14.**
- ATL - Russell Gage 13-yard pass from Matt Ryan (pass failed), 3:26. Saints 26-15. **Drive: 9 plays, 75 yards, 3:01.**
- ATL - Younghoe Koo 43-yard field goal, 1:56. Saints 26-18. **Drive: 8 plays, 34 yards, 1:30.**

**Top passers**

- ATL - Matt Ryan - 35/50, 312 yards, 2 TD, 2 INT
- NO - Drew Brees - 18/30, 184 yards, TD

**Top rushers**

- ATL - Devonta Freeman - 17 rushes, 51 yards
- NO - Alvin Kamara - 11 rushes, 61 yards

**Top receivers**

- ATL - Calvin Ridley - 8 receptions, 91 yards
- NO - Jared Cook - 3 receptions, 85 yards

With a horrendous performance on Thanksgiving, the Falcons surrendered the NFC South title to New Orleans and they would be eliminated from playoff contention at 3-9.

==== Week 14: vs. Carolina Panthers ====
Week Fourteen: Carolina Panthers at Atlanta Falcons – Game summary

Quarter	1	2	3	4	Total
Panthers	0	10	0	10	**20**
**Falcons**	3	10	17	10	**40**

at Mercedes-Benz Stadium, Atlanta, Georgia

- Date: December 8
- Game time: 1:00 p.m. EST
- Game weather: None (retractable roof closed)
- Game attendance: 70,592
- Referee: Clete Blakeman
- TV announcers (Fox): Chris Myers, Daryl Johnston, and Laura Okmin
- Recap, Game Book

Game information

**First quarter**

- ATL – Younghoe Koo 37-yard field goal, 2:47. Falcons 3–0. **Drive: 13 plays, 55 yards, 6:24.**

**Second quarter**

- CAR – Joey Slye 46-yard field goal, 14:51. Tied 3–3. **Drive: 9 plays, 47 yards, 2:56.**
- ATL – Calvin Ridley 15-yard pass from Matt Ryan (Younghoe Koo kick), 5:15. Falcons 10–3. **Drive: 6 plays, 74 yards, 2:03.**
- CAR – Ian Thomas 1-yard pass from Kyle Allen (Joey Slye kick), 1:05. Tied 10–10. **Drive: 9 plays, 87 yards, 1:28.**
- ATL – Younghoe Koo 35-yard field goal, 0:00. Falcons 13–10. **Drive: 6 plays, 58 yards, 1:05.**

**Third quarter**

- ATL – Devonta Freeman 13-yard run (Younghoe Koo kick), 11:08. Falcons 20–10. **Drive: 5 plays, 46 yards, 2:35.**
- ATL – Olamide Zaccheaus 93-yard pass from Matt Ryan (Younghoe Koo kick), 6:30. Falcons 27–10. **Drive: 3 plays, 95 yards, 1:03.**
- ATL – Younghoe Koo 29-yard field goal, 4:55. Falcons 30–10. **Drive: 4 plays, 5 yards, 1:27.**

**Fourth quarter**

- ATL – Younghoe Koo 50-yard field goal, 11:40. Falcons 33–10. **Drive: 7 plays, 17 yards, 3:20.**
- CAR – Joey Slye 42-yard field goal, 7:54. Falcons 33–13. **Drive: 7 plays, 51 yards, 3:46.**
- ATL – Brian Hill 3-yard run (Younghoe Koo kick), 5:08. Falcons 40–13. **Drive: 6 plays, 42 yards, 2:46.**
- CAR – Kyle Allen 1-yard run (Joey Slye kick), 1:26. Falcons 40–20. **Drive: 13 plays, 75 yards, 3:42.**

**Top passers**

- CAR – Kyle Allen – 28/41, 293 yards, TD, 2 INT
- ATL – Matt Ryan – 20/34, 313 yards, 2 TD

**Top rushers**

- CAR – Christian McCaffrey – 11 rushes, 53 yards
- ATL – Devonta Freeman – 17 rushes, 84 yards, TD

**Top receivers**

- CAR – Christian McCaffrey – 11 receptions, 82 yards
- ATL – Olamide Zaccheaus – 1 reception, 93 yards, TD

==== Week 15: at San Francisco 49ers ====
Week Fifteen: Atlanta Falcons at San Francisco 49ers – Game summary

Quarter	1	2	3	4	Total
**Falcons**	0	10	0	19	**29**
49ers	0	10	3	9	**22**

at Levi's Stadium, Santa Clara, California

- Date: December 15
- Game time: 4:25 p.m. EST/1:25 p.m. PST
- Game weather: Partly cloudy, 55 °F (13 °C)
- Game attendance: 70,910
- Referee: Craig Wrolstad
- TV announcers (Fox): Chris Myers, Daryl Johnston, and Laura Okmin
- Recap, Game Book

Game information

**First quarter**

- No scoring plays.

**Second quarter**

- SF – Raheem Mostert 2-yard run (Robbie Gould kick), 12:55. 49ers 7–0. **Drive: 21 plays, 88 yards, 10:43.**
- ATL – Julio Jones 5-yard pass from Matt Ryan (Younghoe Koo kick), 7:01. Tied 7–7. **Drive: 10 plays, 70 yards, 5:54.**
- ATL – Younghoe Koo 43-yard field goal, 2:36. Falcons 10–7. **Drive: 9 plays, 40 yards, 3:37.**
- SF – Robbie Gould 22-yard field goal, 0:24. Tied 10–10. **Drive: 8 plays, 71 yards, 2:12.**

**Third quarter**

- SF – Robbie Gould 46-yard field goal, 5:14. 49ers 13–10. **Drive: 6 plays, 35 yards, 4:00.**

**Fourth quarter**

- SF – Kyle Juszczyk 2-yard pass from Jimmy Garoppolo (kick failed, wide left), 10:07. 49ers 19–10. **Drive: 2 plays, 1 yard, 0:37.**
- ATL – Qadree Ollison 1-yard run (Younghoe Koo kick), 5:15. 49ers 19–17. **Drive: 9 plays, 75 yards, 4:52.**
- SF – Robbie Gould 43-yard field goal, 1:48. 49ers 22–17. **Drive: 8 plays, 50 yards, 3:27.**
- ATL – Julio Jones 5-yard pass from Matt Ryan (run failed), 0:02. Falcons 23–22. **Drive: 10 plays, 70 yards, 1:46.**
- ATL – Olamide Zaccheaus 0-yard fumble return, 0:00. Falcons 29–22.

**Top passers**

- ATL – Matt Ryan – 25/39, 210 yards, 2 TD
- SF – Jimmy Garoppolo – 22/34, 200 yards, TD

**Top rushers**

- ATL – Devonta Freeman – 12 rushes, 39 yards
- SF – Raheem Mostert – 14 rushes, 54 yards, TD

**Top receivers**

- ATL – Julio Jones – 13 receptions, 134 yards, 2 TD
- SF – George Kittle – 13 receptions, 134 yards

==== Week 16: vs. Jacksonville Jaguars ====
Week Sixteen: Jacksonville Jaguars at Atlanta Falcons – Game summary

Quarter	1	2	3	4	Total
Jaguars	0	3	3	6	**12**
**Falcons**	14	3	0	7	**24**

at Mercedes-Benz Stadium, Atlanta, Georgia

- Date: December 22
- Game time: 1:00 p.m. EST
- Game weather: None (retractable roof closed)
- Game attendance: 70,873
- Referee: Adrian Hill
- TV announcers (Fox): Joe Davis, Brady Quinn, and Jenny Taft
- Recap, Game Book

Game information

**First quarter**

- ATL - Devonta Freeman 17-yard run (Younghoe Koo kick), 11:27. Falcons 7-0. **Drive: 6 plays, 82 yards, 3:33.**
- ATL - Devonta Freeman 8-yard pass from Matt Ryan (Younghoe Koo kick), 9:28. Falcons 14-0. **Drive: 4 plays, 25 yards, 1:50.**

**Second quarter**

- JAX - Josh Lambo 40-yard field goal, 9:12. Falcons 14-3. **Drive: 11 plays, 62 yards, 5:03.**
- ATL - Younghoe Koo 23-yard field goal, 0:10. Falcons 17-3. **Drive: 11 plays, 54 yards, 1:37.**

**Third quarter**

- JAX - Josh Lambo 27-yard field goal, 2:29. Falcons 17-6. **Drive: 9 plays, 62 yards, 4:10.**

**Fourth quarter**

- ATL - Qadree Ollison 3-yard run (Younghoe Koo kick), 13:36. Falcons 24-6. **Drive: 7 plays, 87 yards, 3:53.**
- JAX - Chris Conley 42-yard pass from Gardner Minshew (pass failed), 12:00. Falcons 24-12. **Drive: 4 plays, 75 yards, 1:36.**

**Top passers**

- JAX – Gardner Minshew – 13/31, 181 yards, TD
- ATL – Matt Ryan – 32/45, 384 yards, TD, 2 INT

**Top rushers**

- JAX – Leonard Fournette – 15 rushes, 71 yards
- ATL – Brian Hill – 7 rushes, 66 yards

**Top receivers**

- JAX – Chris Conley – 2 receptions, 56 yards
- ATL – Julio Jones – 10 receptions, 166 yards

==== Week 17: at Tampa Bay Buccaneers ====
Week Seventeen: Atlanta Falcons at Tampa Bay Buccaneers – Game summary

Quarter	1	2	3	4	OT	Total
**Falcons**	10	6	0	6	6	**28**
Buccaneers	0	22	0	0	0	**22**

at Raymond James Stadium, Tampa, Florida

- Date: December 29
- Game time: 1:00 p.m. EST
- Game weather: Sunny, 78 °F (26 °C)
- Game attendance: 50,417
- Referee: Carl Cheffers
- TV announcers (Fox): Tim Brando, Matt Millen, and Sara Walsh
- Recap, Game Book

Game information

**First quarter**

- ATL - Ty Sambrailo 35-yard pass from Matt Ryan (Younghoe Koo kick), 10:33. Falcons 7-0. **Drive: 7 plays, 75 yards, 4:27.**
- ATL - Younghoe Koo 27-yard field goal, 6:55. Falcons 10-0. **Drive: 7 plays, 20 yards, 3:23.**

**Second quarter**

- TB - Cameron Brate 2-yard pass from Jameis Winston (Matt Gay kick), 10:23. Falcons 10-7. **Drive: 9 plays, 67 yards, 5:15.**
- ATL - Younghoe Koo 33-yard field goal, 5:20. Falcons 13-7. **Drive: 13 plays, 60 yards, 5:03.**
- TB - Devin White 91-yard fumble return (Matt Gay kick), 3:07. Buccaneers 14-13.
- ATL - Younghoe Koo 45-yard field goal, 0:58. Falcons 16-14. **Drive: 9 plays, 48 yards, 2:09.**
- TB - Breshad Perriman 24-yard pass from Jameis Winston (Jameis Winston run), 0:11. Buccaneers 22-16. **Drive: 5 plays, 76 yards, 0:47.**

**Third quarter**

- No scoring plays.

**Fourth quarter**

- ATL - Younghoe Koo 43-yard field goal, 6:27. Buccaneers 22-19. **Drive: 9 plays, 37 yards, 3:19.**
- ATL - Younghoe Koo 33-yard field goal, 0:00. Tied 22-22. **Drive: 14 plays, 65 yards, 3:01.**

**Overtime**

- ATL - Deion Jones 27-yard interception return, 9:53. Falcons 28-22.

**Top passers**

- ATL – Matt Ryan – 30/51, 313 yards, TD
- TB – Jameis Winston – 13/24, 201 yards, 2 TD, 2 INT

**Top rushers**

- ATL – Devonta Freeman – 18 rushes, 58 yards
- TB – Ronald Jones – 11 rushes, 106 yards

**Top receivers**

- ATL – Julio Jones – 7 receptions, 78 yards
- TB – Breshad Perriman – 5 receptions, 134 yards, TD

=== Standings ===
==== Division ====
NFC South
	W	L	T	PCT	DIV	CONF	PF	PA	STK
^{(3)} New Orleans Saints	13	3	0	.813	5–1	9–3	458	341	W3
Atlanta Falcons	7	9	0	.438	4–2	6–6	381	399	W4
Tampa Bay Buccaneers	7	9	0	.438	2–4	5–7	458	449	L2
Carolina Panthers	5	11	0	.313	1–5	2–10	340	470	L8

==== Conference ====
NFC
#	Team	Division	W	L	T	PCT	DIV	CONF	SOS	SOV	STK
**Division leaders**
1 (Note: San Francisco finished ahead of Green Bay and New Orleans based on head-to-head sweep, claiming the No. 1 seed.)	San Francisco 49ers	West	13	3	0	.813	5–1	10–2	.504	.466	W2
2 (Note: Green Bay claimed the No. 2 seed over New Orleans based on conference record.)	Green Bay Packers	North	13	3	0	.813	6–0	10–2	.453	.428	W5
3	New Orleans Saints	South	13	3	0	.813	5–1	9–3	.486	.459	W3
4	Philadelphia Eagles	East	9	7	0	.563	5–1	7–5	.455	.417	W4
**Wild Cards**
5	Seattle Seahawks	West	11	5	0	.688	3–3	8–4	.531	.463	L2
6	Minnesota Vikings	North	10	6	0	.625	2–4	7–5	.477	.356	L2
**Did not qualify for the postseason**
7	Los Angeles Rams	West	9	7	0	.563	3–3	7–5	.535	.438	W1
8 (Note: Chicago finished ahead of Dallas based on head-to-head victory.)	Chicago Bears	North	8	8	0	.500	4–2	7–5	.508	.383	W1
9	Dallas Cowboys	East	8	8	0	.500	5–1	7–5	.479	.316	W1
10 (Note: Atlanta finished ahead of Tampa Bay based on division record.)	Atlanta Falcons	South	7	9	0	.438	4–2	6–6	.545	.518	W4
11	Tampa Bay Buccaneers	South	7	9	0	.438	2–4	5–7	.500	.384	L2
12	Arizona Cardinals	West	5	10	1	.344	1–5	3–8–1	.529	.375	L1
13	Carolina Panthers	South	5	11	0	.313	1–5	2–10	.549	.469	L8
14	New York Giants	East	4	12	0	.250	2–4	3–9	.473	.281	L1
15	Detroit Lions	North	3	12	1	.219	0–6	2–9–1	.506	.375	L9
16	Washington Redskins	East	3	13	0	.188	0–6	2–10	.502	.281	L4
**Tiebreakers** (Note: When breaking ties for three or more teams under the NFL's rules, they are first broken within divisions, then comparing only the highest-ranked remaining team from each division.)
