= Austin Hooper =

American football player (born 1994)

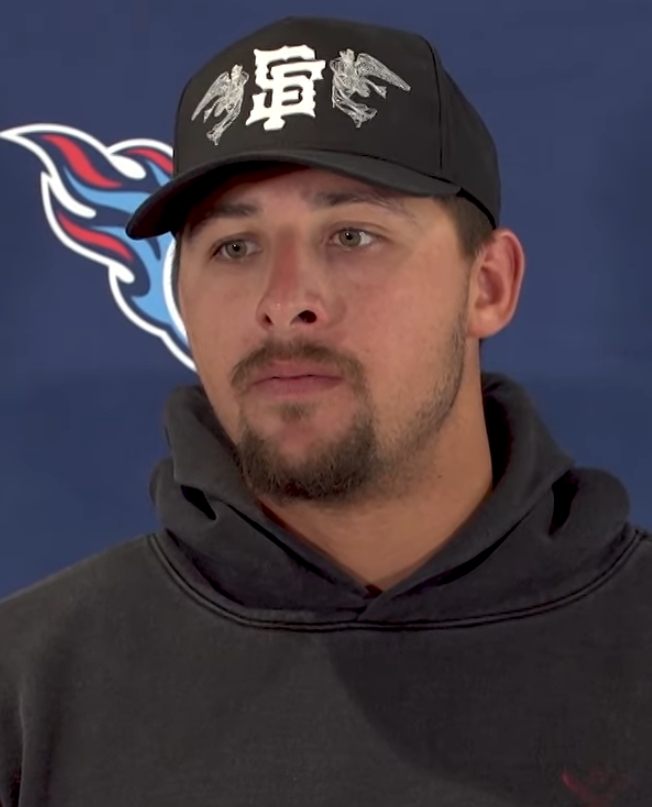
- Hooper with the Tennessee Titans in 2022

No. 81 – Atlanta Falcons
- Position: Tight end
- Roster status: Active

Personal information
- Born: October 29, 1994 (age 32); San Mateo, California, U.S.
- Listed height: 6 ft 4 in (1.93 m)
- Listed weight: 254 lb (115 kg)

Career information
- High school: De La Salle (Concord, California)
- College: Stanford (2013–2015)
- NFL draft: 2016: 3rd round, 81st overall pick

Career history
- Atlanta Falcons (2016–2019); Cleveland Browns (2020–2021); Tennessee Titans (2022); Las Vegas Raiders (2023); New England Patriots (2024–2025); Atlanta Falcons (2026–present)

Awards and highlights
- 2× Pro Bowl (2018, 2019); Third-team All-American (2015); First-team All-Pac-12 (2015); Second-team All-Pac-12 (2014)

Career NFL statistics as of Week 5, 2026
- Receptions: 435
- Receiving yards: 4,481
- Receiving touchdowns: 31
- Stats at Pro Football Reference

Austin Manuel Hooper (born October 29, 1994) is an American professional football tight end for the Atlanta Falcons of the National Football League (NFL). He played college football for the Stanford Cardinal and was selected by the Falcons in the third round of the 2016 NFL draft. Hooper has also played for the Cleveland Browns, Tennessee Titans, Las Vegas Raiders, and New England Patriots.

== Early life ==
Hooper attended De La Salle High School in Concord, California, where he played for the football team. He was rated by Rivals.com as a three-star recruit and committed to Stanford University to play college football. Hooper was listed as a defensive end by Rivals and also by ESPN who had him rated as a four-star recruit and the #261 player overall in the nation regardless of position.

== College career ==
After redshirting his first year at Stanford in 2013, Hooper played in all 13 games as a redshirt freshman in 2014. He finished the season with 40 receptions for 499 yards and two touchdowns.

As a sophomore in 2015, Hooper had 34 receptions for 438 yards for six touchdowns, including a career best 79 yards and a touchdown in an upset of then #6 USC. He was a finalist for the John Mackey Award, and First-team All-Pac-12 Conference.

== Professional career ==
=== Pre-draft ===
On January 4, 2016, it was announced that Hooper would forfeit his last two years of eligibility and enter the 2016 NFL draft. The draft class was notably thin at tight end and his draft stock was high after coming off an impressive season. Hooper was one of 15 tight ends to receive an invitation to the NFL Scouting Combine in Indianapolis, Indiana. He had an overall impressive performance, finishing third among all tight ends in the 40-yard dash, fourth in the bench press, fifth in the three-cone drill, and finished sixth among his position group in the vertical.

On March 17, 2016, Hooper opted to participate at Stanford's Pro Day, performing only positional drills for scouts and team representatives that included San Francisco 49ers head coach Chip Kelly and Oakland Raiders offensive coordinator Bill Musgrave.

Throughout the pre-draft process, Hooper attended private workouts and visits with the Miami Dolphins, Atlanta Falcons, Denver Broncos, and Tennessee Titans. Hooper was projected to be a second or third round pick by NFL draft experts and scouts. He was ranked the second best tight end prospect in the draft by NFLDraftScout.com and the third best tight end by Sports Illustrated and NFL analyst Mike Mayock.

Pre-draft measurables
Height	Weight	Arm length	Hand span	Wingspan	40-yard dash	10-yard split	20-yard split	20-yard shuttle	Three-cone drill	Vertical jump	Broad jump	Bench press	Wonderlic
6 ft 3 3/4 in (1.92 m)	254 lb (115 kg)	33 3/4 in (0.86 m)	10 5/8 in (0.27 m)	6 ft 7 3/8 in (2.02 m)	4.70 s	1.62 s	2.75 s	4.32 s	7.00 s	33 in (0.84 m)	9 ft 9 in (2.97 m)	19 reps	29
All values from NFL Combine/Pro Day

=== Atlanta Falcons (first stint) ===
==== 2016 season ====
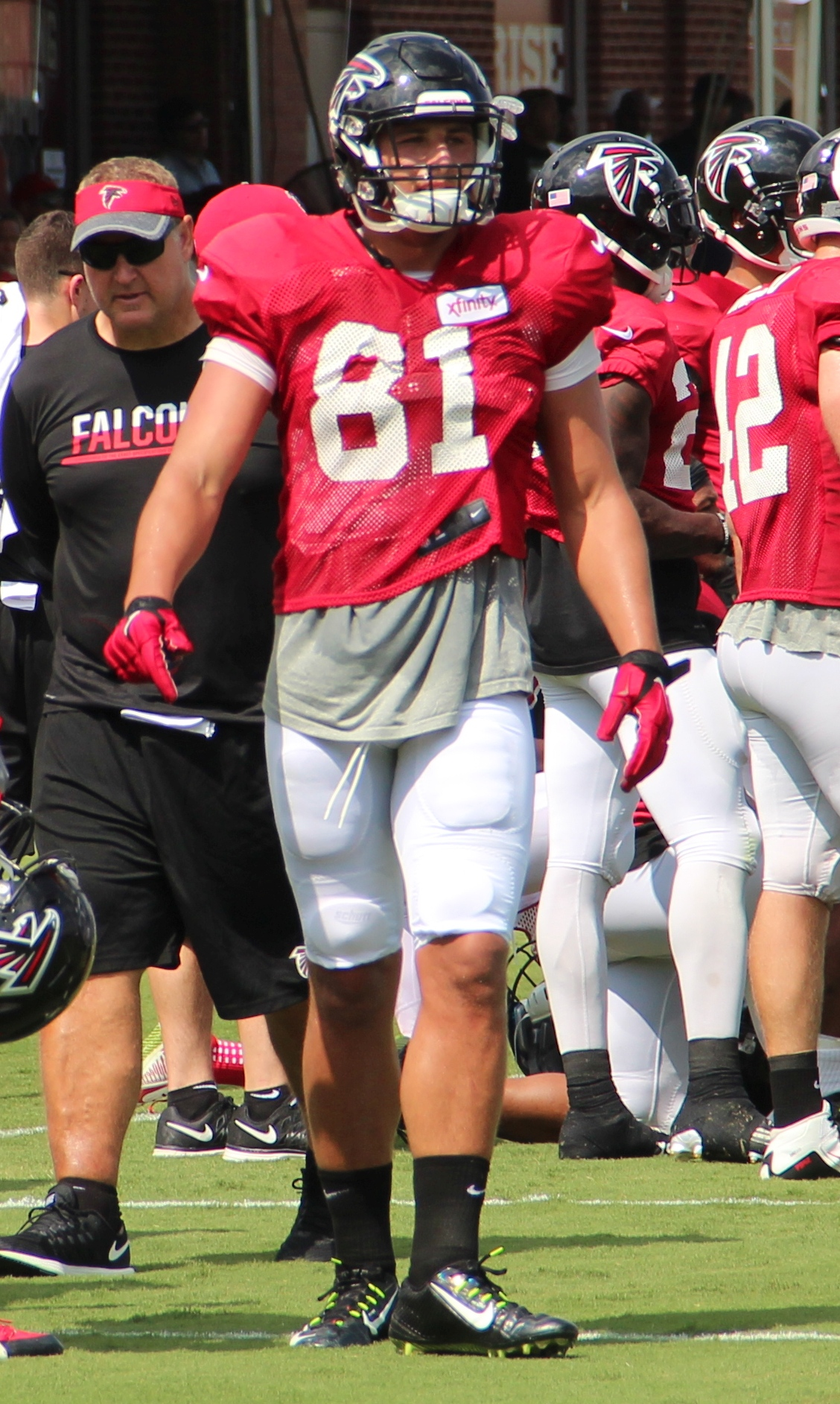
Hooper at training camp in 2016

The Falcons selected Hooper in the third round (81st overall) of the 2016 NFL draft. He was the second tight end selected, behind Arkansas' Hunter Henry, who was drafted by the San Diego Chargers in the second round (35th overall). Hooper was reunited with former Stanford teammate Levine Toilolo.

On May 5, 2016, the Falcons signed Hooper to a four-year, $3.21 million contract that includes a signing bonus of $773,428.

Throughout his first training camp, Hooper competed with Levine Toilolo and Jacob Tamme for job as the starting tight end. Head coach Dan Quinn named him the third tight end on the Falcons' depth chart behind Tamme and Toilolo.

Hooper made his NFL debut during the season-opening 31–24 loss to the Tampa Bay Buccaneers and made the first catch of his career on a 14-yard pass by Matt Ryan in the third quarter before being tackled by Buccaneers' safety Bradley McDougald. Three weeks later, Hooper caught his first NFL touchdown on a 42-yard pass from Ryan in a 48–33 victory over the Carolina Panthers.

During Week 8 against the Green Bay Packers, Hooper earned his first NFL start and had a season-high five receptions for 41 yards in the narrow 33–32 victory. Starting tight end Jacob Tamme suffered a shoulder injury during the game and was eventually placed on injured/reserve for the rest of the season. In the next game against the Buccaneers, Hooper recorded three receptions for 46 yards and a touchdown during the 43–28 road victory. During Week 15 against the San Francisco 49ers, Hooper caught a nine-yard pass before leaving the 41–13 victory after suffering a grade-2 knee sprain that caused him to miss the remaining two games of the regular season.

Hooper finished his rookie year with 19 receptions for 271 yards and three touchdowns in 14 games and three starts. The Falcons finished the 2016 season atop the NFC South with an 11–5 record and qualified for the playoffs as the #2-seed. In the Divisional Round against the Seattle Seahawks, Hooper appeared in his first playoff game and caught a 10-yard pass during the 36–20 victory. After the Falcons defeated the Packers in the NFC Championship Game, they went on to face the New England Patriots in Super Bowl LI. During the game, Hooper made three receptions for 32 yards and scored a 19-yard touchdown in the second quarter of the Falcons' 34–28 overtime loss.

==== 2017 season ====
Hooper entered training camp slated as the starting tight end after the retirement of Jacob Tamme. He was named the starting tight end to begin the regular season under new offensive coordinator Steve Sarkisian.

Hooper started in the season-opener at the Chicago Bears and made two receptions for a career-high 128 yards and a career-long 88-yard touchdown during the 23–17 victory. During Week 4 against the Buffalo Bills, Hooper tied his then career-high with five receptions for 50 yards in the 23–17 loss. On October 15, 2017, he caught a career-high seven passes for 48 yards in the Falcons' 20–17 loss to the Dolphins. At the midpoint of the 16-game season, Hooper was second on the team in receiving yards only to All-Pro wide receiver Julio Jones. Overall, Hooper finished the 2017 season with 49 receptions for 526 receiving yards and three receiving touchdowns.

==== 2018 season ====
Hooper remained as the Falcons' starting tight end going into the 2018 season. He scored his first receiving touchdown of the season in Week 2 against the Panthers. In Week 11, against the Cleveland Browns, he had a career-high 10 receptions for 56 yards and a touchdown in the loss. He finished the season with 71 receptions for 660 yards and four touchdowns. On January 15, 2019, Hooper was named to his first Pro Bowl as a replacement for Eagles tight end Zach Ertz.

==== 2019 season ====
In Week 3 against the Indianapolis Colts, Hooper caught six passes for 66 yards and two touchdowns as the Falcons lost 27–24. In the next game against the Titans, Hooper caught nine passes for a career-high 130 yards during the 24–10 loss. Two weeks later against the Arizona Cardinals, Hooper caught eight passes for 117 yards and a touchdown in the narrow 34–33 loss.

During Week 10 against the New Orleans Saints, Hooper had four receptions for 17 yards and a touchdown in the 26–9 victory. Hooper suffered an MCL sprain during the win and was ruled out for the next three games. During Week 16 against the Jacksonville Jaguars, Hooper caught seven passes for 82 yards in the 24–12 victory. On January 20, 2020, Hooper was named to his second Pro Bowl as a replacement for 49ers tight end George Kittle. Overall, Hooper finished the 2019 season with 75 receptions for 787 receiving yards and six receiving touchdowns.

=== Cleveland Browns ===
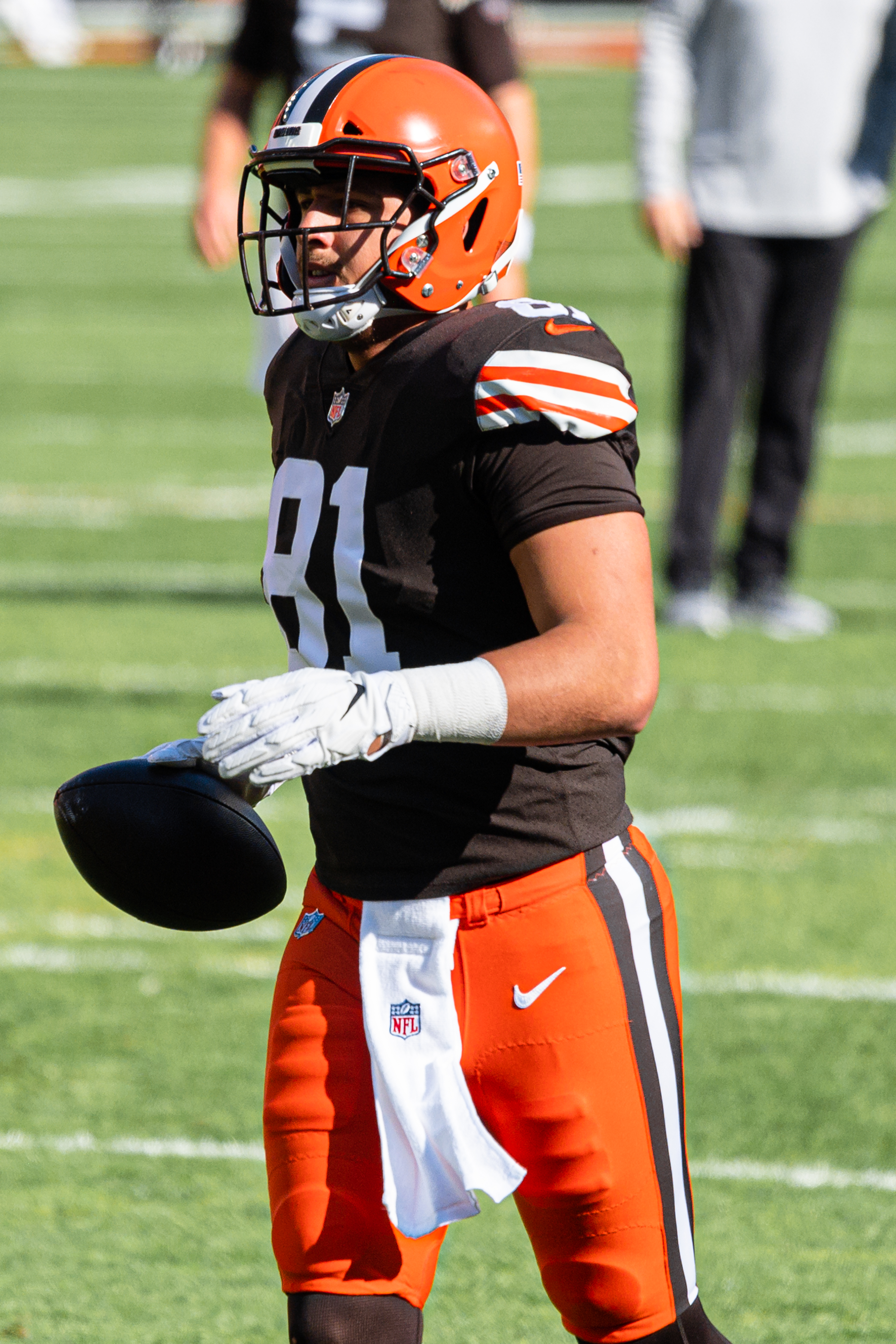
Hooper in 2021

On March 20, 2020, Hooper signed a four-year deal with the Browns. The deal was worth $44 million, with a $10 million signing bonus. Hooper finished the 2020 season with 46 receptions for 435 yards and four touchdowns. During the Wild Card Round against the Pittsburgh Steelers, Hooper caught seven passes for 46 yards and a touchdown in the 48–37 road victory.

Hooper was the starting tight end going into the 2021 season for the Browns. He finished the season with 38 receptions for 345 yards and three touchdowns. On March 17, 2022, Hooper was released by the Browns.

=== Tennessee Titans ===
On March 21, 2022, Hooper signed a one-year contract with the Titans. In the 2022 season, Hooper had 41 receptions for 444 yards and two touchdowns, which both came in Week 11 against the Packers.

=== Las Vegas Raiders ===
On March 22, 2023, Hooper signed with the Las Vegas Raiders. In the 2023 season, Hooper had 25 receptions for 234 yards in 17 games and nine starts.

=== New England Patriots ===
On March 14, 2024, Hooper signed with the New England Patriots. Hooper finished the 2024 season with 45 receptions for 476 yards and three touchdowns.

On March 9, 2025, Hooper re-signed with the Patriots on a one-year, $5 million contract. He finished the 2025 season with 21 receptions for 263 yards and two touchdowns. During Super Bowl LX, Hooper had two receptions for 10 yards in the 29–13 loss to the Seahawks.

=== Atlanta Falcons (second stint) ===
On March 9, 2026, Hooper signed with the Atlanta Falcons on a one-year, $3.25 million contract.

== Career statistics ==
=== NFL ===
==== Regular season ====
Year	Team	Games		Receiving				
Year	Team	GP	GS	Rec	Yds	Avg	Lng	TD
2016	ATL	14	3	19	271	14.3	44	3
2017	ATL	16	8	41	526	12.8	88	3
2018	ATL	16	7	71	660	9.3	36	4
2019	ATL	13	10	75	787	10.5	35	6
2020	CLE	13	13	46	435	9.5	36	4
2021	CLE	16	16	38	345	9.1	34	3
2022	TEN	17	2	41	444	10.8	24	2
2023	LV	17	9	25	234	9.4	21	0
2024	NE	17	8	45	476	10.6	38	3
2025	NE	16	6	21	263	12.5	31	2
2026	ATL	5	1	5	40	8.0	13	1
Total		160	83	435	4,481	10.3	88	31

==== Postseason ====
Year	Team	Games		Receiving				
Year	Team	GP	GS	Rec	Yds	Avg	Lng	TD
2016	ATL	3	1	6	65	10.8	19	1
2017	ATL	2	2	4	18	4.5	5	0
2020	CLE	2	2	9	62	6.9	11	1
2025	NE	4	2	3	24	8.0	14	0
Total		11	7	22	169	7.7	19	2

=== College ===
Season	Team	Conf	Class	Pos	GP	Receiving			
Season	Team	Conf	Class	Pos	GP	Rec	Yds	Avg	TD
2014	Stanford	Pac-12	FR	TE	13	40	499	12.5	2
2015	Stanford	Pac-12	SO	TE	13	34	438	12.9	6
Career					26	74	937	12.7	8

== Personal life ==
Hooper is of African-American, Mexican, Irish, Native American and Belgian descent.
