= Jaeden Graham =

American football player (born 1995)

No. 87
- Position: Tight end

Personal information
- Born: October 10, 1995 (age 31); Aurora, Colorado, U.S.
- Listed height: 6 ft 4 in (1.93 m)
- Listed weight: 250 lb (113 kg)

Career information
- High school: Cherry Creek (Greenwood Village, Colorado)
- College: Yale
- NFL draft: 2018: undrafted

Career history
- Atlanta Falcons (2018–2021); Philadelphia Eagles (2022)*
- * Offseason or practice squad member only

Career NFL statistics
- Receptions: 9
- Receiving yards: 149
- Receiving touchdowns: 1
- Stats at Pro Football Reference

Jaeden Graham (born October 10, 1995) is an American former professional football player who was a tight end in the National Football League (NFL). He played college football for the Yale Bulldogs.

== College career ==
As a senior at Yale University, Graham was a first-team All-Ivy League honoree after starting 10 games and finishing the season with four touchdowns and 26 receptions.

== Professional career ==
Pre-draft measurables
Height	Weight	Arm length	Hand span	40-yard dash	10-yard split	20-yard split	20-yard shuttle	Three-cone drill	Vertical jump	Broad jump
6 ft 3 5/8 in (1.92 m)	239 lb (108 kg)	32 7/8 in (0.84 m)	10 in (0.25 m)	4.74 s	1.59 s	2.76 s	4.60 s	7.42 s	33.0 in (0.84 m)	10 ft 2 in (3.10 m)
All values from Pro Day

=== Atlanta Falcons ===
Graham was signed by the Atlanta Falcons as an undrafted free agent on June 1, 2018. He was waived on September 1, 2018, and was signed to the practice squad the next day. He signed a reserve/future contract with the Falcons on December 31, 2018.

Graham signed a contract extension with the Falcons on March 12, 2021. He was placed on injured reserve on August 5, 2021.

=== Philadelphia Eagles ===
Graham was signed by the Philadelphia Eagles on July 27, 2022. He was placed on injured reserve on August 5. He was released on September 2.
