= Qadree Ollison =

American football player (born 1996)

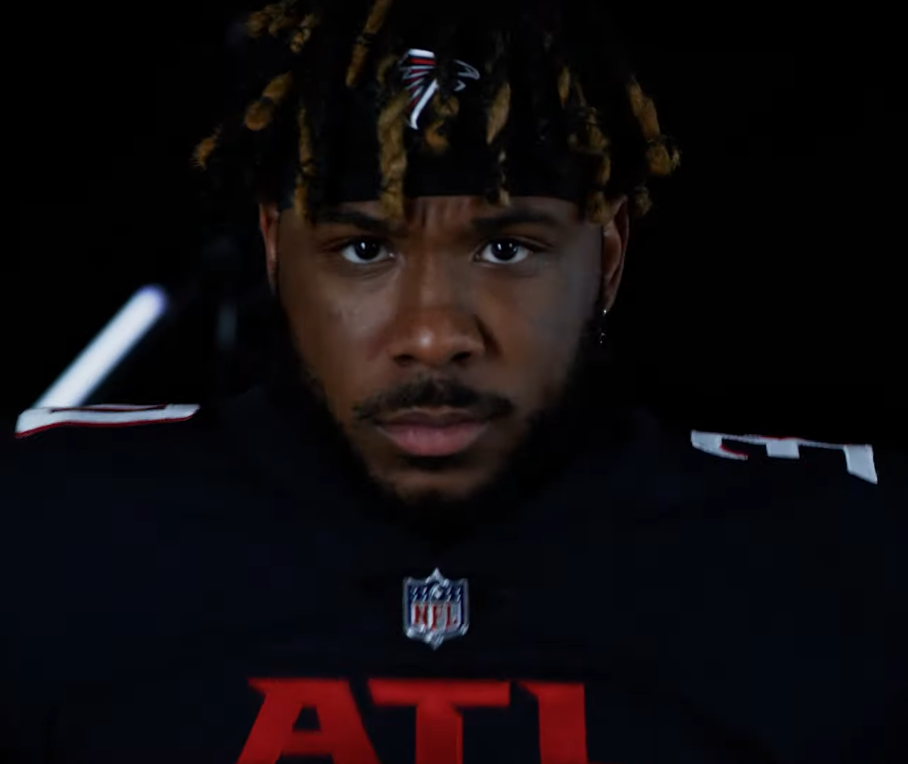
- Ollison with the Atlanta Falcons in 2021

Profile
- Position: Running back

Personal information
- Born: September 8, 1996 (age 30); Niagara Falls, New York, U.S.
- Listed height: 6 ft 1 in (1.85 m)
- Listed weight: 232 lb (105 kg)

Career information
- High school: Canisius (Buffalo, New York)
- College: Pittsburgh (2014–2018)
- NFL draft: 2019: 5th round, 152nd overall pick

Career history
- Atlanta Falcons (2019–2021); Dallas Cowboys (2022); Jacksonville Jaguars (2023)*; Pittsburgh Steelers (2023); BC Lions (2025)*
- * Offseason or practice squad member only

Awards and highlights
- ACC Offensive Rookie of the Year (2015); Second-team All-ACC (2015)

Career NFL statistics
- Rushing yards: 158
- Rushing average: 3.6
- Rushing touchdowns: 5
- Receptions: 5
- Receiving yards: 19
- Stats at Pro Football Reference

Qadree Waymond Ollison (born September 8, 1996) is an American professional football running back. He played college football for the Pittsburgh Panthers and was selected by the Atlanta Falcons in the fifth round of the 2019 NFL draft.

== Early life ==
Ollison attended and played high school football at Canisius High School in Buffalo, New York.

== College career ==
Ollison attended and played college football at Pittsburgh.

=== Statistics ===
Qadree Ollison						Rushing				Receiving			
Year	School	Conf	Class	Pos	G	Att	Yds	Avg	TD	Rec	Yds	Avg	TD
2015	Pitt	ACC	FR	RB	13	212	1,121	5.3	11	14	77	5.5	1
2016	Pitt	ACC	SO	RB	10	33	127	3.8	2	2	38	19.0	0
2017	Pitt	ACC	JR	RB	12	90	398	4.4	5	23	194	8.4	2
2018	Pitt	ACC	SR	RB	14	194	1,213	6.3	11	11	66	6.0	0
Career	Pitt				49	529	2,859	5.4	29	50	375	7.5	3

== Professional career ==
Pre-draft measurables
Height	Weight	Arm length	Hand span	40-yard dash	10-yard split	20-yard split	20-yard shuttle	Three-cone drill	Vertical jump	Broad jump	Bench press
6 ft 0 5/8 in (1.84 m)	228 lb (103 kg)	31 1/2 in (0.80 m)	9 5/8 in (0.24 m)	4.58 s	1.63 s	2.68 s	4.25 s	7.13 s	29.5 in (0.75 m)	9 ft 6 in (2.90 m)	19 reps
All values from NFL Combine/Pro Day

=== Atlanta Falcons ===
Ollison was drafted by the Atlanta Falcons in the fifth round (152nd overall) of the 2019 NFL draft. In the Week 11 matchup against the Carolina Panthers, Ollison scored from two yards out on his first career rushing attempt during the second quarter of the 29–3 win. During Week 12 against the Tampa Bay Buccaneers, Ollison scored his second career touchdown. As a rookie, he appeared in eight games and recorded 22 carries for 50 rushing yards and four rushing touchdowns.

On September 2, 2021, Ollison was waived by the Falcons and re-signed to the practice squad. He was promoted to the active roster on December 11. During the Week 18 matchup against the New Orleans Saints, he scored his fifth career touchdown on a 19-yard rushing attempt in the 30–20 loss.

On March 28, 2022, Ollison re-signed with the Falcons. He was waived on August 30.

=== Dallas Cowboys ===
On September 1, 2022, Ollison was signed to the Dallas Cowboys practice squad. The signing reunited him with defensive coordinator Dan Quinn, who was his head coach with the Falcons. On October 29, 2022, he was elevated to the active roster from the practice squad. On November 12, 2022, he was elevated to the active roster from the practice squad. On December 29, 2022, he was elevated to the active roster from the practice squad. His practice squad contract with the team expired after the season on January 22, 2023.

=== Jacksonville Jaguars ===
On February 13, 2023, Ollison signed a reserve/future contract with the Jacksonville Jaguars. He was released on August 29, 2023, as a part of the team’s final roster cuts.

=== Pittsburgh Steelers ===
On September 2, 2023, Ollison was signed to the practice squad of the Pittsburgh Steelers. He was released on December 11, 2023.

=== BC Lions ===
On January 14, 2025, Ollison signed with the BC Lions of the Canadian Football League (CFL). He was released on May 14, 2025.
