= Sean Murphy =

Sean Murphy may refer to:

== Sports ==
- Seán Óg Murphy (1897–1956), Irish hurler
- Seán Murphy (hurler) (born 1947), Irish hurler
- Seán Murphy (Gaelic footballer) (1932–2025), Irish Gaelic football player
- Sean Murphy (footballer, born 1995), Scottish footballer
- Sean Murphy (boxer) (born 1964), English Commonwealth Games gold-winning boxer
- Sean Murphy (swimmer) (born 1964), Canadian swimmer
- Sean Murphy (golfer) (born 1965), American golfer
- Sean Murphy (racing driver) (born 1984), in Auckland, New Zealand
- Sean Murphy (baseball) (born 1994), American baseball player
- Sean Murphy (rower) (born 1996), Australian rower

== Other ==
- Sean Murphy (artist), American comic book creator
- Sean Murphy (cryptographer), professor at Royal Holloway, University of London
- Sean Murphy (journalist) (born 1958), Australian journalist
- Sean Murphy (photographer), American photographer
- Sean D. Murphy, professor at George Washington University
- Sean Murphy (Oz), a fictional character on the television series Oz

== See also ==
- Sean Murphy-Bunting, American football player
- Shaun Murphy (disambiguation)
- Shawn Murphy (disambiguation)
