= Jamel Dean =

American football player (born 1996)

- Dean with the Pittsburgh Steelers in 2026

No. 35 – Pittsburgh Steelers
- Position: Cornerback
- Roster status: Active

Personal information
- Born: October 15, 1996 (age 30); Cocoa, Florida, U.S.
- Listed height: 6 ft 1 in (1.85 m)
- Listed weight: 206 lb (93 kg)

Career information
- High school: Cocoa
- College: Auburn (2015–2018)
- NFL draft: 2019: 3rd round, 94th overall pick

Career history
- Tampa Bay Buccaneers (2019–2025); Pittsburgh Steelers (2026–present)

Awards and highlights
- Super Bowl champion (LV)

Career NFL statistics as of Week 10, 2026
- Total tackles: 391
- Sacks: 1.0
- Forced fumbles: 6
- Fumble recoveries: 2
- Pass deflections: 70
- Interceptions: 12
- Defensive touchdowns: 2
- Stats at Pro Football Reference

Jamel Dean (born October 15, 1996) is an American professional football cornerback for the Pittsburgh Steelers of the National Football League (NFL). He played college football for the Auburn Tigers.

== College career ==
After spending a semester at Ohio State while medically disqualified, Dean announced that he would transfer to Auburn in May 2015. Following his sophomore year at Auburn where he had 43 tackles and eight pass breakups, Dean was named to Bruce Feldman's college football freaks list. On December 29, 2018, Dean announced that he would forgo his final year of eligibility and declare for the 2019 NFL draft.

== Professional career ==
=== Pre-draft ===
On December 28, 2018, Dean officially announced his decision to forgo his senior season and declared himself eligible for the 2019 NFL Draft. Although his collegiate career was hampered by injuries, Dean was able to perform well as the NFL Scouting Combine to establish himself as an ideal draft prospect. Pro Football Focus ranked him as the ninth best cornerback prospect in the draft. He was ranked as the 15th best cornerback prospect (126th overall) by Scouts Inc. Sports Illustrated ranked Dean as the 16th best cornerback (142nd overall) in the draft. NFL draft analysts including NFL.com analyst Lance Zierlein projected Dean to be drafted in the third or fourth round of the 2019 NFL Draft. He reportedly attended a pre-draft visit with the Detroit Lions.

External videos
- NFL Draft Profile: Jamel Dean
- Jamel Dean runs 4.30s 40-yard dash

Pre-draft measurables
Height	Weight	Arm length	Hand span	Wingspan	40-yard dash	10-yard split	20-yard split	20-yard shuttle	Three-cone drill	Vertical jump	Broad jump	Bench press
6 ft 1 in (1.85 m)	206 lb (93 kg)	31 3/4 in (0.81 m)	9 1/8 in (0.23 m)	6 ft 5 in (1.96 m)	4.30 s	1.47 s	2.54 s	4.19 s	7.02 s	41 in (1.04 m)	10 ft 10 in (3.30 m)	16 reps
All values from NFL Combine

=== Tampa Bay Buccaneers ===
==== 2019 ====
The Tampa Bay Buccaneers selected Dean in the third round (94th overall) of the 2019 NFL draft. He was the second cornerback selected by the Buccaneers after second round pick (39th overall) Sean Murphy-Bunting and was the 11th cornerback taken overall.

On July 8, 2019, the Tampa Bay Buccaneers signed Dean to a four–year, $3.55 million contract that includes an initial signing bonus of $846,852.

Throughout training camp, he competed for a role at starting cornerback against Vernon Hargreaves, Ryan Smith, M. J. Stewart, and fellow rookie Sean Murphy-Bunting. Head coach Bruce Arians named Dean a backup cornerback to begin the season and listed him as the fourth cornerback on the depth chart, behind starters Carlton Davis and Vernon Hargreaves III and primary backup and starting nickelback M. J. Stewart.

On September 8, 2019, Dean made his professional regular season debut, seeing limited snaps on special teams, as the Buccaneers lost their home-opener 17–31 to the San Francisco 49ers. He was inactive for three consecutive games (Weeks 3-5) due to an ankle injury. On November 3, 2019, Dean saw his first significant playing time on defense after No. 1 starting cornerback Carlton Davis suffered a hip injury during pre-game warmups. Dean was targeted by the Seattle Seahawks' quarterback Russell Wilson throughout the game and was exploited by D. K. Metcalf and Tyler Lockett, giving up three touchdown receptions as he collected a season-high six combined tackles (five solo) and led the team with four pass deflections during a 40–34 loss. He became the fourth cornerback on the depth chart behind Vernon Hargreaves III, Sean Murphy-Bunting, and M. J. Stewart as Carlton Davis remained inactive for Week 9 due to his hip injury. On November 10, 2019, in another attempt to exploit a weakness in the secondary, the Arizona Cardinals targeted the rookie Dean as he recorded two solo tackles, had a team-high four pass deflections, and made his first career interception on a pass attempt by Kyler Murray to wide receiver Trent Sherfield with less than four minutes left in the fourth quarter to interrupt a possible comeback by Arizona during a 30–27 victory. He improved his performance and was only responsible for giving up one reception for a two-yard loss in Week 10. On November 12, 2019, the Buccaneers unexpectedly released former first-round pick Vernon Hargreaves III after he started the first nine games. The following day, it was reported that M. J. Stewart would be inactive due to a knee sprain. Dean was subsequently listed as the third cornerback on the depth chart and first-team nickelback behind starters Carlton Davis and Sean Murphy-Bunting. In Week 12, Dean earned his first career start as the No. 2 starting cornerback and recorded two solo tackles and a season-high five pass deflections in a 35–22 win at the Atlanta Falcons. In Week 16, he made one solo tackle, one pass deflection, and an intercepted a pass by Deshaun Watson to wide receiver Kenny Stills during a 20–23 loss against the Houston Texans. He finished his rookie season with a total of 21 combined tackles (16 solo), 17 pass deflections, two interceptions, and one forced fumble in 13 games and five starts.

==== 2020 ====
He entered training camp slated to return as the No. 3 cornerback on the depth chart under defensive coordinator Todd Bowles. Head coach Bruce Arians had Dean listed as the third cornerback on the depth chart to begin the season, behind starting tandem Carlton Davis and Sean Murphy-Bunting.

On September 13, 2020, Dean collected a season-high seven solo tackles in the Tampa Bay Buccaneers' season-opening 23–34 loss at the New Orleans Saints. In Week 3, he earned his first start of the season and racked up a season-high eight combined tackles (six solo) during a 28–10 win at the Detroit Lions. In Week 5, he produced three combined tackles (two solo) and set a season-high with four pass deflections during a 19–20 loss at the Chicago Bears. On October 18, 2020, Dean made two combined tackles (one solo), broke up a pass, and returned an interception that was thrown by Aaron Rodgers to wide receiver Davante Adams for 32–yards to score his first career touchdown as the Buccaneers defeated the Green Bay Packers 38–10. He became the third player to ever have a pick-six off Aaron Rodgers, joining Tanard Jackson and William Jackson III as the only players to accomplish the rare feat. Head coach Bruce Arians named Dean a starting cornerback beginning in Week 8. On November 23, 2020, Dean produced four combined tackles (three solo) before exiting in the third quarter of a 24–27 loss to the Los Angeles Rams as he was evaluated for a possible concussion after taking a helmet-to-helmet collision with wide receiver Robert Woods. He was diagnosed with a concussion and remained sidelined for a 24–27 loss against the Kansas City Chiefs in Week 12. He remained inactive for a 26–14 victory against the Minnesota Vikings in Week 14 after injuring his knee. He finished the season with 62 combined tackles (51 solo), one interception, and seven passes defended in 14 games and seven starts. He earned an overall grade of 74.4 from Pro Football Focus.

The Tampa Bay Buccaneers finished the 2020 NFL season second in the NFC South with an 11–5 record and earned a Wildcard berth. On January 9, 2021, Dean started in his first career playoff appearance and had seven solo tackles as the Buccaneers defeated the Washington Football Team 31–23 in the Wild Card Round. The Buccaneers had a 30–20 victory at the New Orleans Saints in the Divisional Round. In the NFC Championship Game, they had a 30–26 victory at the Green Bay Packers to advance to the Super Bowl. On February 7, 2021, Dean started in Super Bowl LV and recorded four solo tackles and made one pass deflection as they routed the Kansas City Chiefs 31–9. Dean earned the first and only Super Bowl ring of his career.

==== 2021 ====
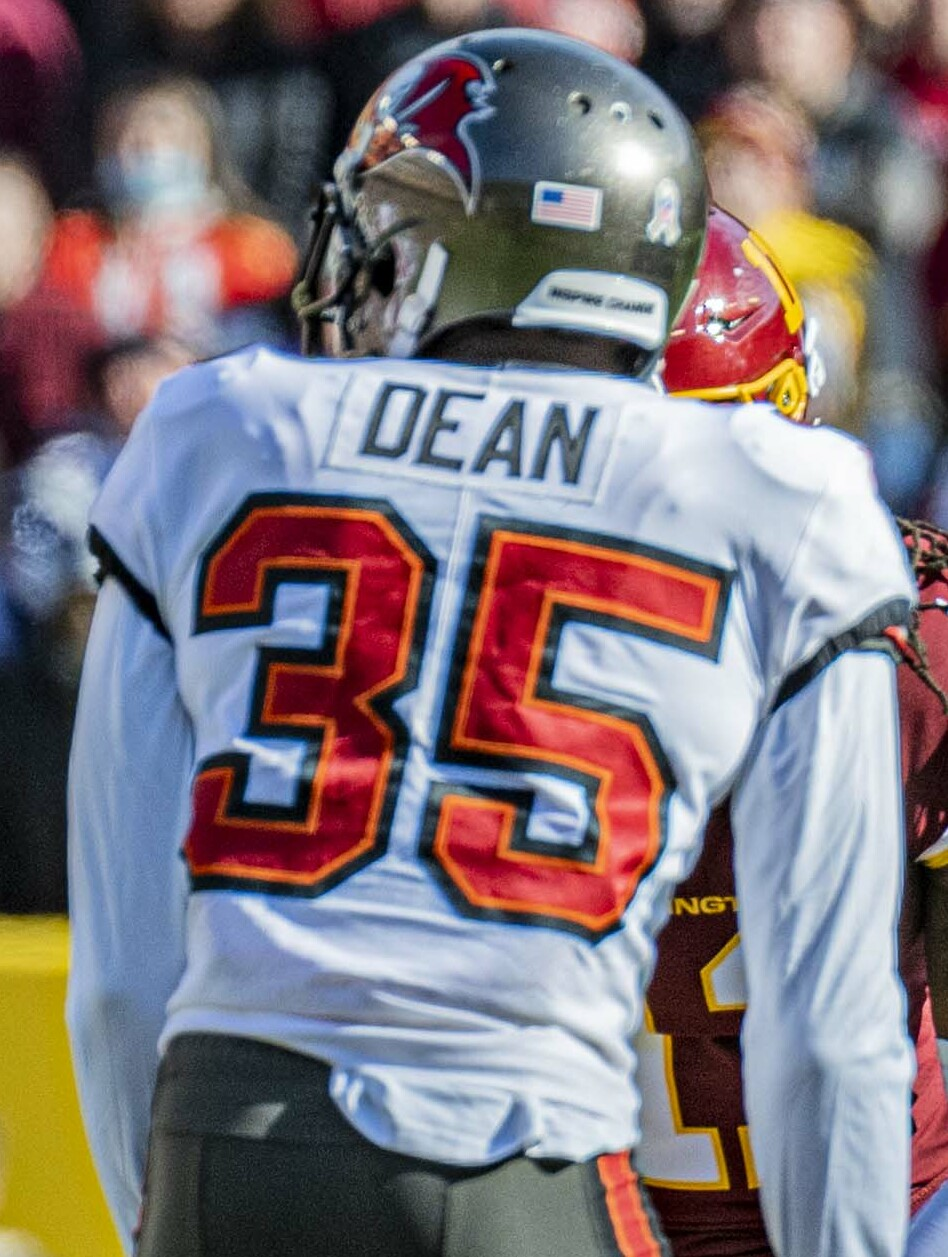
Dean with the Tampa Bay Buccaneers in 2021

He returned as the No. 3 cornerback on the depth chart behind starting cornerbacks Carlton Davis and Sean Murphy-Bunting. On September 9, 2021, he collected a season-high nine combined tackles (four solo) and broke up a pass during a 31–29 win against the Dallas Cowboys in the Buccaneers' home-opener. He was inactive during a 19–17 win at the New England Patriots in Week 4 due to a knee injury. In Week 5, he recorded five solo tackles, made two pass deflections, and intercepted a pass thrown by Jacoby Brissett to wide receiver Jaylen Waddle as the Buccaneers routed the Miami Dolphins 45–17. The following week, he made a season-high four pass deflections and intercepted a pass by Jalen Hurts to wide receiver Quez Watkins during a 28–22 win at the Philadelphia Eagles. He was inactive during a 0–9 loss at the New Orleans Saints in Week 15 due to an illness. On December 28, 2021, the Buccaneers officially placed him on the COVID-19/reserve list. He finished the season with 53 combined tackles (44 solo), nine pass deflections, and two interceptions in 15 games and 11 starts.

The Tampa Bay Buccaneers finished the 2021 NFL season a top the NFC South with a 13–4 record, clinching a playoff berth. On January 17, 2022, Dean recorded eight combined tackles (seven solo) and made one pass deflection during a 31–15 win against the Philadelphia Eagles in the NFC Wildcard Game. The following week, he made seven combined tackles (five solo) as the Buccaneers lost 27–30 to the Los Angeles Rams in the Divisional Round.

==== 2022 ====
On March 30, 2022, the Tampa Bay Buccaneers announced that head coach Bruce Arians would step down as head coach and transition into an advisory role. Subsequently, defensive coordinator Todd Bowles was promoted to head coach. Throughout training camp, Dean competed against Sean Murphy-Bunting to be the No. 2 starting cornerback. Head coach Todd Bowles named him a starting cornerback to begin the season, alongside Carlton Davis.

On September 18, 2022, Dean made six combined tackles (three solo), two pass deflections, and a career-high two interceptions off passes thrown by Jameis Winston during a 20–10 win at the New Orleans Saints. In Week 6, he collected a season-high six solo tackles as the Buccaneers lost 18–20 at the Pittsburgh Steelers. He was inactive for two games (Weeks 15–16) after injuring his toe. He finished the season with 57 combined tackles (45 solo), eight pass deflections, and two interceptions in 15 games and 15 starts. He received an overall grade of 77.4 from Pro Football Focus.

==== 2023 ====
On March 13, 2023, the Tampa Bay Buccaneers signed Dean to a four–year, $52.00 million contract extension that includes $24.50 million guaranteed, $21.50 million guaranteed upon signing, and an initial signing bonus of $11.42 million.

He entered the 2023 NFL season as the starting cornerback and was paired with Carlton Davis. He was inactive during a 26–9 victory at the New Orleans Saints in Week 4 due to a neck injury. In Week 7, Dean racked up a season-high ten combined tackles (nine solo) and recovered a fumble as the Buccaneers lost 13–16 to the Atlanta Falcons. The following week, he made eight solo tackles and a season-high two pass deflections during an 18–24 loss at the Buffalo Bills in Week 8. He injured his ankle and was unable to participate in three consecutive games (Weeks 12–14). He finished the season with 61 combined tackles (46 solo), seven pass deflections, and two fumble recoveries in 13 games and 13 starts. He earned an overall grade of 74.3 from Pro Football Focus, which ranked 26th among 127 qualifying cornerbacks.

==== 2024 ====
He entered training camp slated as the de facto No. 1 starting cornerback following the departure of Carlton Davis. Head coach Todd Bowles named him a starting cornerback to begin the season and paired him with Zyon McCollum.

In Week 3, he collected a season-high 13 combined tackles (nine solo) during a 7–26 loss against the Detroit Lions. He injured his hamstring and was sidelined for four consecutive games (Weeks 7–10). On December 15, 2024, Dean made three combined tackles (two solo), tied his season-high of two pass deflections, and made his only interception of the season on a pass thrown by Justin Herbert to wide receiver Quentin Johnston during a 40–17 win at the Los Angeles Chargers. He was inactive as the Buccaneers defeated the New Orleans Saints 27–19 after injuring his knee. He finished the 2024 NFL season with a total of 59 combined tackles (45 solo), seven pass deflections, and one interception in 12 games and 12 starts. He received an overall grade of 75.1 from Pro Football Focus, which ranked 25th among 223 qualifying cornerbacks.

==== 2025 ====
In Week 6, Dean recorded four tackles, a sack, interception, and a forced fumble in a 30-19 win over the San Francisco 49ers, earning NFC Defensive Player of the Week.

=== Pittsburgh Steelers ===
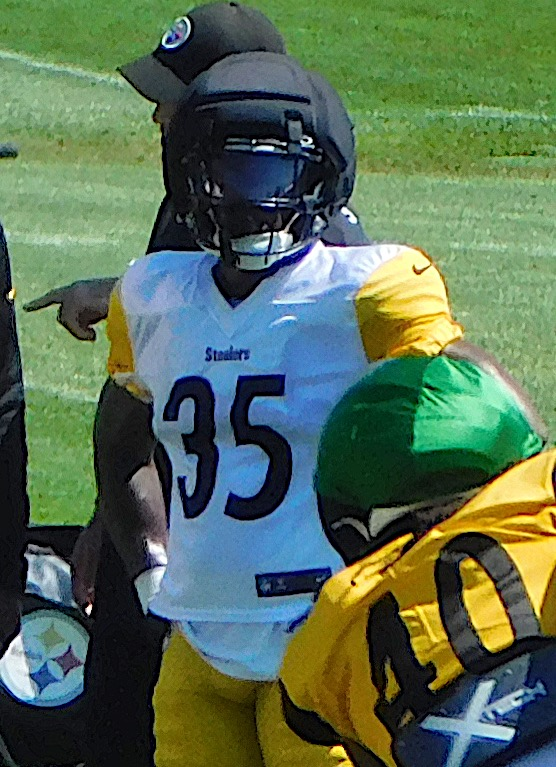
Dean with the Pittsburgh Steelers in 2026

On March 13, 2026, Dean signed a three-year, $36.75 million contract with the Pittsburgh Steelers.

== NFL career statistics ==
Legend
	Won the Super Bowl
	Led the league
**Bold**	Career high

=== Regular season ===
Year	Team	Games		Tackles						Interceptions						Fumbles				
Year	Team	GP	GS	Cmb	Solo	Ast	Sck	TFL	Sfty	PD	Int	Yds	Avg	Lng	TD	FF	Fum	FR	Yds	TD
2019	TB	13	5	21	16	5	0.0	1	0	**17**	2	31	15.5	31	0	0	**1**	0	0	0
2020	TB	14	7	**62**	**51**	11	0.0	**2**	0	7	1	32	**32.0**	32	**1**	0	0	0	0	0
2021	TB	15	11	53	44	9	0.0	**2**	0	9	2	6	3.0	6	0	0	0	0	0	0
2022	TB	15	15	57	45	12	0.0	1	0	8	2	24	12.0	24	0	0	0	0	0	0
2023	TB	13	13	61	46	**15**	0.0	0	0	4	0	0	0.0	0	0	0	0	**2**	**7**	0
2024	TB	12	12	59	45	14	0.0	0	0	7	1	0	0.0	0	0	1	0	0	0	0
2025	TB	14	14	46	38	8	**1.0**	1	0	9	**3**	**74**	24.7	**55**	**1**	**2**	0	0	0	0
2026	PIT	8	8	32	21	11	0.0	0	0	9	1	40	40.0	40	0	3	0	0	0	0
Career		104	85	391	306	85	1.0	7	0	70	12	207	17.3	55	2	6	1	2	7	0

=== Postseason ===
Year	Team	Games		Tackles						Interceptions						Fumbles				
Year	Team	GP	GS	Cmb	Solo	Ast	Sck	TFL	Sfty	PD	Int	Yds	Avg	Lng	TD	FF	Fum	FR	Yds	TD
2020	TB	4	4	**16**	**15**	1	0.0	0	0	3	0	0	0.0	0	0	0	0	0	0	0
2021	TB	2	2	15	12	**3**	0.0	0	0	1	0	0	0.0	0	0	**1**	0	0	0	0
2022	TB	1	0	0	0	0	0.0	0	0	0	0	0	0.0	0	0	0	0	0	0	0
2023	TB	2	2	15	13	2	0.0	**1**	0	**4**	0	0	0.0	0	0	0	0	0	0	0
2024	TB	1	1	4	3	1	0.0	0	0	1	0	0	0.0	0	0	0	0	0	0	0
Career		10	9	50	43	7	0.0	1	0	9	0	0	0.0	0	0	1	0	0	0	0

=== Buccaneers franchise records ===
==== Rookie records ====
- Most pass deflections by a rookie – 17
