= Carlton Davis =

American football player (born 1996)

Carlton Davis III
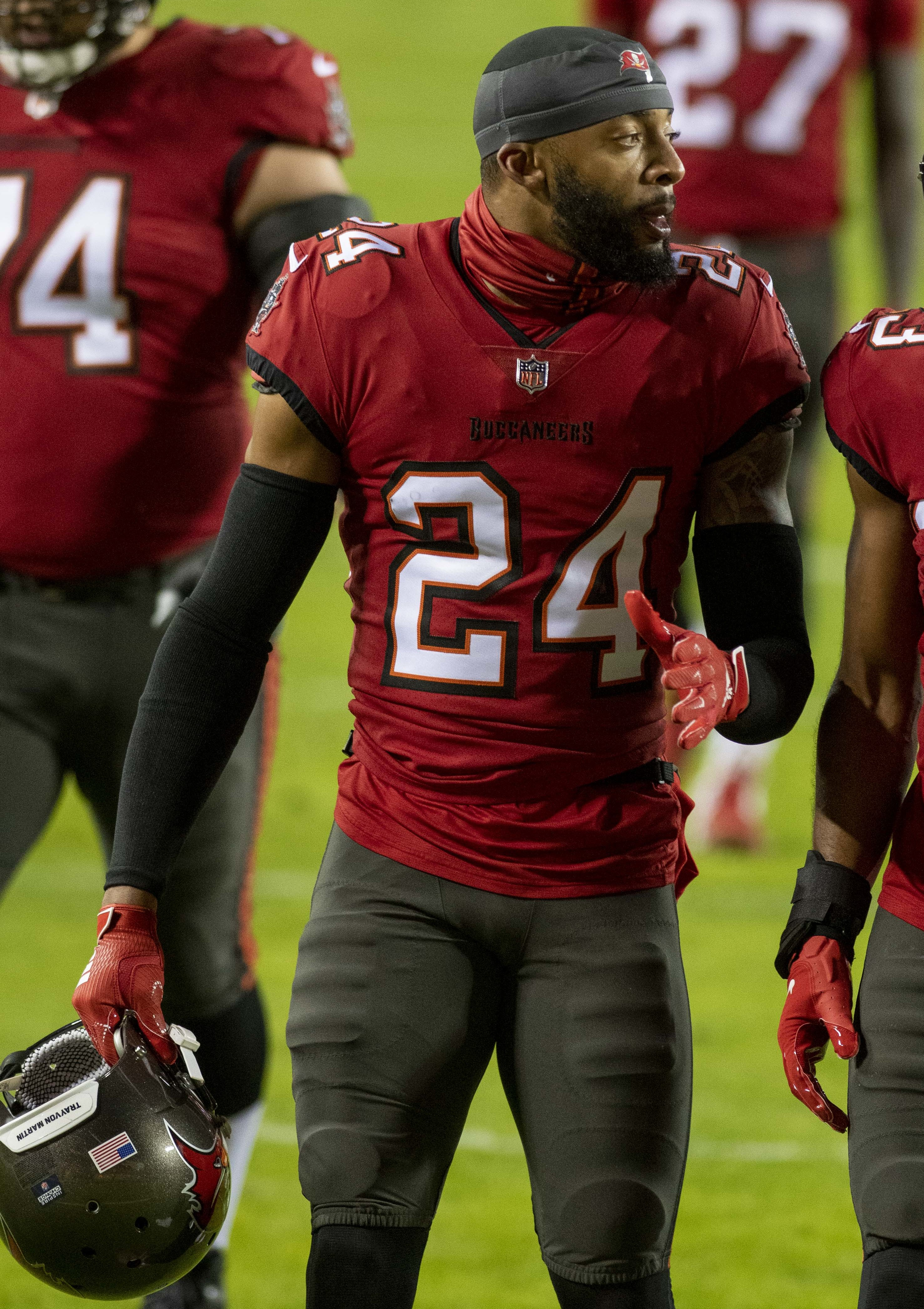
- Davis with the Tampa Bay Buccaneers in 2021

No. 7 – New England Patriots
- Position: Cornerback
- Roster status: Active

Personal information
- Born: December 31, 1996 (age 29); Miami, Florida, U.S.
- Listed height: 6 ft 1 in (1.85 m)
- Listed weight: 200 lb (91 kg)

Career information
- High school: Miami Norland (Miami Gardens, Florida)
- College: Auburn (2015–2017)
- NFL draft: 2018: 2nd round, 63rd overall pick

Career history
- Tampa Bay Buccaneers (2018–2023); Detroit Lions (2024); New England Patriots (2025–present)

Awards and highlights
- Super Bowl champion (LV); First-team All-American (2017); First-team All-SEC (2017); Freshman All-American (2015); Freshman All-SEC Team (2015)

Career NFL statistics as of Week 1, 2026
- Total tackles: 453
- Forced fumbles: 4
- Fumble recoveries: 6
- Pass deflections: 94
- Interceptions: 11
- Stats at Pro Football Reference

Carlton Davis III (born December 31, 1996) is an American professional football cornerback for the New England Patriots of the National Football League (NFL). He played college football for the Auburn Tigers and was selected by the Tampa Bay Buccaneers in the second round of the 2018 NFL draft.

== Early life ==
Davis attended Miami Norland Senior High School in Miami Gardens, Florida, where he played high school football. He originally committed to Ohio State University to play college football but changed his commitment to Auburn University.

== College career ==
Davis was a starter as a true freshman at Auburn in 2015. He finished the season with 56 tackles and three interceptions. As a sophomore in 2016, he recorded 46 tackles. Davis finished the 2017 season with 36 tackles, 12 pass deflections, and one interception. On January 3, 2018, Davis declared his intentions to enter the 2018 NFL draft.

== Professional career ==
=== Pre-draft ===
Davis attended the NFL Scouting Combine in Indianapolis and completed the majority of drills, but opted to skip the short shuttle and three-cone drill. Davis finished eighth among all cornerbacks in the broad jump and bench press. On March 9, 2018, he participated at Auburn's pro day and performed the majority of drills, but elected to skip the bench press, vertical jump, and broad jump. Davis also improved his times in the 40-yard dash (4.44s), 20-yard dash (2.60s), and 10-yard dash (1.59s). At the conclusion of the pre-draft process, Davis was projected to a second round pick by NFL draft experts and scouts. He was ranked as the sixth best cornerback prospect in the draft by Sports Illustrated, was ranked the eighth best cornerback by DraftScout.com, and was ranked as the ninth best cornerback in the draft by Scouts Inc.

External videos
- Carlton Davis' NFL Combine Workout

Pre-draft measurables
Height	Weight	Arm length	Hand span	Wingspan	40-yard dash	10-yard split	20-yard split	20-yard shuttle	Three-cone drill	Vertical jump	Broad jump	Bench press
6 ft 1 in (1.85 m)	206 lb (93 kg)	32 3/4 in (0.83 m)	8 7/8 in (0.23 m)	6 ft 7 3/8 in (2.02 m)	4.44 s	1.59 s	2.60 s	4.31 s	7.30 s	34.0 in (0.86 m)	10 ft 4 in (3.15 m)	16 reps
All values are from NFL Combine/Pro Day

=== Tampa Bay Buccaneers ===
==== 2018 ====
The Tampa Bay Buccaneers selected Davis in the second round (63rd overall) of the 2018 NFL Draft. Davis was the second cornerback drafted by the Tampa Bay Buccaneers in 2018 after second round pick (53rd overall) M. J. Stewart and also was the ninth cornerback drafted. The Buccaneers acquired this pick during a trade where they sent their 2018 third round (56th overall) pick to the New England Patriots in exchange for a third round (63rd overall) and fourth round pick (117th overall). The Patriots went on to draft cornerback Duke Dawson while the Buccaneers used their selections on Carlton Davis and safety Jordan Whitehead, who both started in Super Bowl LV.

External videos
- Buccaneers draft Davis 63rd overall
- NFL Draft Profile: Carlton Davis

On May 24, 2018, the Tampa Bay Buccaneers signed Davis to a four–year, $4.39 million contract that includes $2.43 million guaranteed and a signing bonus of $1.27 million. Prior to the season-opener, Brent Grimes injured his groin during practice and Davis was subsequently inserted to the starting lineup in his place.

Throughout training camp, he competed to be a starting cornerback against M. J. Stewart, Vernon Hargreaves, and Ryan Smith. Head coach Dirk Koetter named Davis the third cornerback on the depth chart to begin the season, behind starting cornerbacks Brent Grimes and Vernon Hargreaves.

On September 9, 2018, Davis made his professional regular season debut and earned his first career start and recorded four combined tackles (three solo) during a 48–40 win against the New Orleans Saints. In Week 2, Davis recorded a season-high six solo tackles, made a pass deflection, and had his first career fumble recovery via a strip-sack by teammate Kwon Alexander on Nick Foles as the Buccaneers defeated the Philadelphia Eagles 27–21. He was inactive during a Week 655 loss at the Atlanta Falcons after injuring his groin. A knee injury caused him to miss two consecutive games (Weeks 13–14). In Week 16, he recorded two solo tackles and had his first career forced fumble during a 27–20 loss to the Dallas Cowboys. He finished his rookie season with 40 combined tackles (36 solo), four pass deflections, one forced fumble, and one fumble recovery in 13 games and 13 starts. On December 30, 2018, the Tampa Bay Buccaneers fired head coach Dirk Koetter after they finished the 2018 NFL season with a 5–11 record.

==== 2019 ====
On January 8, 2019, the Tampa Bay Buccaneers announced the hiring of former Arizona Cardinals' head coach Bruce Arians as their new head coach. He entered training camp as a possibility to takeover projected to be the de facto No. 1 starting cornerback after the departure of Brent Grimes and was part of a cornerback group that included Vernon Hargreaves III, M. J. Stewart, Ryan Smith, rookie Sean Murphy-Bunting, and rookie Jamel Dean. New defensive coordinator Todd Bowles appointed Davis and Vernon Hargreaves as the starting cornerbacks to begin the season.

In Week 4, Davis collected a season–high eight solo tackles during a 55–40 win at the Los Angeles Rams. In Week 9, Davis injured his hip during pre-game warmups and was inactive as the Buccaneers lost in overtime 34–40 at the Seattle Seahawks. He subsequently missed the next game during a 30–27 win against the Arizona Cardinals. On November 24, 2019, Davis recorded five solo tackles, a career-high five pass deflections, and had his first career interception off a pass thrown by Matt Ryan to wide receiver Calvin Ridley during a 35–22 win at the Atlanta Falcons. He finished the season with 60 combined tackles (54 solo), 19 pass deflections, one forced fumble, one fumble recovery, and one interception in 14 games and 14 starts.

==== 2020 ====
On April 8, 2020, Davis announced that he would be changing his jersey number from 33 to 24 in honor of the late Kobe Bryant. Head coach Bruce Arians retained Davis as the No. 1 starting cornerback and paired him with Sean Murphy-Bunting.

In Week 4, Davis recorded three combined tackles (two solo), made two pass deflections, and an interception off a pass thrown by Justin Herbert late in the fourth quarter to secure a 38–31 victory against the Los Angeles Chargers. On October 8, 2020, Davis recorded a season-high seven solo tackles, broke up two passes, and intercepted a pass by Nick Foles to wide receiver Allen Robinson during a 19–20 loss on Thursday Night Football at the Chicago Bears. The following week, he recorded six combined tackles (five solo) and a season-high four pass deflections as the Buccaneers defeated the Green Bay Packers 38–10. On November 2, 2020, Davis made three combined tackles (two solo), two pass deflections, and set a career-high with four interceptions after intercepting a pass by Daniel Jones to wide receiver Sterling Shepard during a 25–23 win at the New York Giants. He injured his groin and missed the last two games of the season (Weeks 16–17). He finished the season with a total of 68 combined tackles (52 solo), 18 pass deflections, and a career-high four interceptions in 14 games and 14 starts.

The Tampa Bay Buccaneers finished the 2020 NFL season with a 11–5 record, finishing second in the NFC South to clinch a Wildcard berth. On January 9, 2021, Davis started in his first career playoff appearance and recorded nine combined tackles (eight solo) and two pass deflections during a 31–23 win at the Washington Football Team in the NFC Wildcard Game. The following week, the Buccaneers defeated the New Orleans Saints in the Divisional Round 30–20. On January 24, 2021, he recorded seven combined tackles (four solo) during a 31–26 win at the Green Bay Packers in the NFC Championship Game. On February 7, 2021, he started in Super Bowl LV and made five combined tackles (three solo) as the Tampa Bay Buccaneers routed the Kansas City Chiefs 31–9.

==== 2021 ====
He entered training camp slated as the de facto No. 1 starting cornerback and was a part of a cornerback group that included Jamel Dean, Dee Delaney, Sean Murphy-Bunting, and Ross Cockrell. Head coach Bruce Arians named Carlton Davis and Jamel Dean the starting cornerbacks to begin the season.

On September 9, 2021, Davis started in the Tampa Bay Buccaneers' home-opener against the Dallas Cowboys and made two solo tackles, a season-high three pass deflections, and made his lone interception of the season on a pass thrown by Dak Prescott to CeeDee Lamb during a 31–29 victory. The following week, he collected a season–high nine combined tackles (eight solo) and broke up a pass during a 48–25 win against the Atlanta Falcons. On October 7, 2021, the Tampa Bay Buccaneers officially placed Davis on injured reserve after injuring his quadriceps in Week 4. On December 3, 2021, the Buccaneers activated him from injured reserve and added him to their active roster after he missed seven consecutive games (Weeks 5–12). He finished the season with a total of 39 combined tackles (33 solo), 11 pass deflections, and one interception in ten games and ten starts.

==== 2022 ====
On March 16, 2022, the Tampa Bay Buccaneers re-signed Davis to a three–year, $44.50 million contract extension that includes $30.00 million guaranteed, $24.50 million guaranteed upon signing, and an initial signing bonus of $10.00 million.

On March 30, 2022, the Tampa Bay Buccaneers promoted defensive coordinator Todd Bowles to head coach after Bruce Arians shifted to a senior football consultant role. Bowles retained Davis as the No. 1 starting cornerback and paired him with Sean Murphy-Bunting.

On September 18, 2022, Davis racked up a season–high nine combined tackles (eight solo), made one pass deflection, and recovered a fumble during a 20–10 win at the New Orleans Saints. He was sidelined two games (Weeks 7–8) after injuring his hip. On December 18, 2022, he recorded six solo tackles, a season-high four pass deflections, and had his only interception of the season on a pass thrown by Joe Burrow to wide receiver Ja'Marr Chase during a 34–23 loss against the Cincinnati Bengals. He was inactive for the last two games (Weeks 17–18) of the season after suffering a concussion. He finished the 2022 NFL season with a total of 65 combined tackles (53 solo), 12 pass deflections, one forced fumble, a fumble recovery, and an interception in 13 games and 13 starts.

==== 2023 ====
He entered the 2023 NFL season as the starting cornerback and was paired with Jamel Dean. He injured his toe and was subsequently inactive for two games (Weeks 2–3). He aggravated his toe injury and was unable to play in the Buccaneers' Week 10 victory against the Tennessee Titans. On November 26, 2023, Davis collected a season–high ten combined tackles (eight solo), made two pass deflections, and intercepted a pass by Gardner Minshew to Josh Downs during a 20–27 loss at the Indianapolis Colts. On December 10, 2023, he recorded four solo tackles, a season-high three pass deflections, and intercepted a pass thrown by Desmond Ridder to running back Bijan Robinson during a 29–25 win at the Atlanta Falcons. He finished the season with 52 combined tackles (40 solo), nine pass deflections, and two interceptions in 12 games and 12 starts.

=== Detroit Lions ===
On March 13, 2024, the Tampa Bay Buccaneers traded Davis and two sixth-round picks to the Detroit Lions for a third-round pick (92nd overall, Jalen McMillan) in the 2024 NFL draft. On March 18, 2024, the Detroit Lions signed Davis to a one–year, $14.50 million contract that includes an initial signing bonus of $12.74 million. He entered training camp as the de facto No. 1 starting cornerback. Head coach Dan Campbell named Davis and Terrion Arnold the starting cornerbacks to begin the regular season.

On September 8, 2024, Davis started in the Detroit Lions' home-opener against the Los Angeles Rams and set a season-high with ten combined tackles (six solo) during a 26–20 overtime victory. In Week 4, Davis recorded seven combined tackles (four solo), set a season-high with three pass deflections, and recovered a fumble as the Lions defeated the Seattle Seahawks 42–29. On November 10, 2024, he made four solo tackles, two pass deflections, and set a season-high with two interceptions on passes thrown by C. J. Stroud during a 23–26 victory at the Houston Texans. On November 24, 2024, Davis recorded one solo tackle before exiting during the fourth quarter of a 24–6 victory at the Indianapolis Colts due to a leg injury. He was subsequently inactive as the Lions defeated the Chicago Bears 23–20 in Week 13 due to a quadriceps injury. In Week 15, Davis recorded two solo tackles before he was assisted off the field early in the second quarter after he was injured while making a tackle on running back Ray Davis during the Lions 42–48 loss to the Buffalo Bills.

Prior to the injury, Davis recorded two interceptions, 11 passes defended, a forced fumble, and two fumble recoveries. On January 7, 2025, head coach Dan Campbell announced that Davis would miss the remainder of the season.

=== New England Patriots ===
On March 13, 2025, the New England Patriots signed Davis to a three–year, $60.00 million contract that includes $34.50 million guaranteed upon signing and an initial signing bonus of $16.00 million. He finished the 2025 season with 69 tackles (39 solo) and 10 pass deflections in 17 games and starts. He had six total tackles in Super Bowl LX, a 29–13 loss to the Seattle Seahawks.

== Controversies ==
On April 4, 2021, Davis tweeted the offensive Asian slur "gooks". When informed it meant an offensive term for Asian people, he proceeded to cite a section of the Urban Dictionary which states its use as also meaning lame in South Florida slang. The following day, he tweeted an apology and vowed not to use the term again.

== NFL career statistics ==
Legend
	Won the Super Bowl
**Bold**	Career high

=== Regular season ===
Year	Team	Games		Tackles				Interceptions						Fumbles			
Year	Team	GP	GS	Cmb	Solo	Ast	Sck	PD	Int	Yds	Avg	Lng	TD	FF	FR	Yds	TD
2018	TB	13	12	40	36	4	0.0	4	0	–	–	–	–	**1**	1	0	0
2019	TB	14	14	60	**54**	6	0.0	**19**	1	0	0.0	0	0	**1**	1	6	0
2020	TB	14	14	68	52	16	0.0	18	**4**	**42**	10.5	**34**	0	0	0	–	–
2021	TB	10	10	39	33	6	0.0	11	1	25	**25.0**	25	0	0	1	0	0
2022	TB	13	13	65	53	12	0.0	12	1	0	0	0	0	**1**	1	0	0
2023	TB	12	12	52	40	12	0.0	9	2	3	1.5	3	0	0	0	–	–
2024	DET	13	13	56	42	14	0.0	11	2	0	0.0	0	0	**1**	**2**	**49**	0
2025	NE	**17**	**17**	**69**	39	**30**	0.0	10	0	–	–	–	–	0	0	–	–
2026	NE	1	1	3	2	1	0.0	0	0	-	-	-	-	-	0	0	-
Career		107	106	452	351	101	0.0	94	11	70	7.7	34	0	4	6	55	0

=== Postseason ===
Year	Team	Games		Tackles				Interceptions						Fumbles			
Year	Team	GP	GS	Cmb	Solo	Ast	Sck	PD	Int	Yds	Avg	Lng	TD	FF	FR	Yds	TD
2020	TB	**4**	**4**	**22**	**16**	**6**	0.0	3	0	–	–	–	–	0	0	–	–
2021	TB	2	2	7	5	2	0.0	1	0	–	–	–	–	0	0	–	–
2022	TB	1	1	4	3	1	0.0	0	0	–	–	–	–	0	0	–	–
2023	TB	2	2	11	10	1	0.0	2	0	–	–	–	–	0	0	–	–
2024	DET	0	0	Did not play due to injury													
2025	NE	**4**	**4**	20	14	**6**	0.0	**4**	**2**	0	0.0	0	0	0	0	–	–
Career		13	13	64	48	16	0.0	10	2	0	0.0	0	0	0	0	–	–
