= Shaun Murphy (disambiguation) =

Shaun Murphy (born 1982) is an English snooker player.

Shaun Murphy may also refer to:

- Shaun Murphy (soccer) (born 1970), Australian former soccer player
- Shaun Murphy (hurler) (born 1990), Irish hurling player
- Shaun Murphy (singer) (born 1948), a.k.a. Stoney, American female singer
- Shaun Murphy (The Good Doctor), a fictional character on the TV series The Good Doctor
- The Shaun Murphy Band, a blues band

== See also ==
- Sean Murphy (disambiguation)
- Shawn Murphy (disambiguation)
