= Super Bowl LV =

2021 National Football League championship game

Kansas City Chiefs (1) (AFC) (14–2)	Tampa Bay Buccaneers (5) (NFC) (11–5)
9	31
Head coach: Andy Reid	Head coach: Bruce Arians
	1	2	3	4	Total
KC	3	3	3	0	9
TB	7	14	10	0	31
- Date: February 7, 2021
- Stadium: Raymond James Stadium; Tampa, Florida (Note: The game was originally scheduled to be played at SoFi Stadium in Inglewood, California.)
- MVP: Tom Brady, quarterback
- Favorite: Chiefs by 3
- Referee: Carl Cheffers
- Attendance: 24,835 (Note: Only 37% of the seats were filled due to the COVID-19 pandemic.)

Ceremonies
- National anthem: Eric Church and Jazmine Sullivan
- Coin toss: Suzie Dorner, ICU nurse representing medical personnel during the COVID-19 pandemic
- Halftime show: The Weeknd

TV in the United States
- Network: CBS; ESPN Deportes
- Announcers: Jim Nantz (play-by-play); Tony Romo (analyst); Tracy Wolfson and Evan Washburn (sideline reporters); Jay Feely (special teams analyst); Gene Steratore (rules analyst)
- Nielsen ratings: 38.2 (national); 59.9 (Kansas City); 52.3 (Tampa Bay); U.S. viewership: 96.4 million
- Cost of 30-second commercial: $5.6 million

Radio in the United States
- Network: Westwood One
- Announcers: Kevin Harlan (play-by-play); Kurt Warner (analyst); Laura Okmin and Tony Boselli (sideline reporters)

Super Bowl LV was an American football game played to determine the champion of the National Football League (NFL) for the 2020 season. The National Football Conference (NFC) champion Tampa Bay Buccaneers defeated the defending Super Bowl and American Football Conference (AFC) champions Kansas City Chiefs, 31–9. The game was played on February 7, 2021, at Raymond James Stadium in Tampa, Florida, the home stadium of the Buccaneers, marking the first time a team played a Super Bowl in its home stadium. Due to COVID-19 protocols limiting the stadium's seating capacity with an official attendance of 24,835 officially, it was the least attended NFL championship game since December 1937, and the lowest in the post-merger era (1966-67 season).

The Buccaneers' victory was their second and made them one of two teams, along with the Baltimore Ravens, to be undefeated in multiple Super Bowls. They finished the regular season with an 11–5 record and a wild card berth to advance to their second Super Bowl appearance through the guidance of several new acquisitions, most notably 21-year veteran quarterback Tom Brady in his first season away from the New England Patriots. The Chiefs, aided by their top-ranked offense, finished the regular season with a league-best 14–2 record to advance to their fourth Super Bowl appearance and were the defending Super Bowl LIV champions, seeking to become the first repeat champions since the Patriots in 2004.

For the first time under quarterback Patrick Mahomes, the Chiefs failed to score a touchdown and lost by double-digits, making them the third Super Bowl team not to score a touchdown. (Note: The first two were the Miami Dolphins in Super Bowl VI and the Los Angeles Rams in Super Bowl LIII) They also committed 11 penalties for 120 yards, including a record eight penalties for 95 yards in the first half, most of which were called against the defense. The Buccaneers capitalized on these struggles to take a 21–6 lead at halftime and dominated the remainder of the game. Brady, who also extended his player records for Super Bowl appearances to ten and wins to seven, was named Super Bowl MVP for a record fifth time and was the first to receive the award with multiple franchises. He became the oldest player to receive the honor and win a Super Bowl as the starting quarterback at age 43, breaking additional personal records, while Bruce Arians was the oldest head coach to win the Super Bowl at 68.

The game was televised nationally by CBS. Country music singer Eric Church and R&B singer Jazmine Sullivan performed the national anthem, while the halftime show was headlined by Canadian singer the Weeknd. On television, Super Bowl LV was seen by 91.63 million viewers, the lowest ratings for the game since 2006. Combined with viewership on other platforms, viewership was down by 5% overall in comparison to Super Bowl LIV, but with a 69% increase in average streaming viewership.

== Background ==
=== Host selection process ===
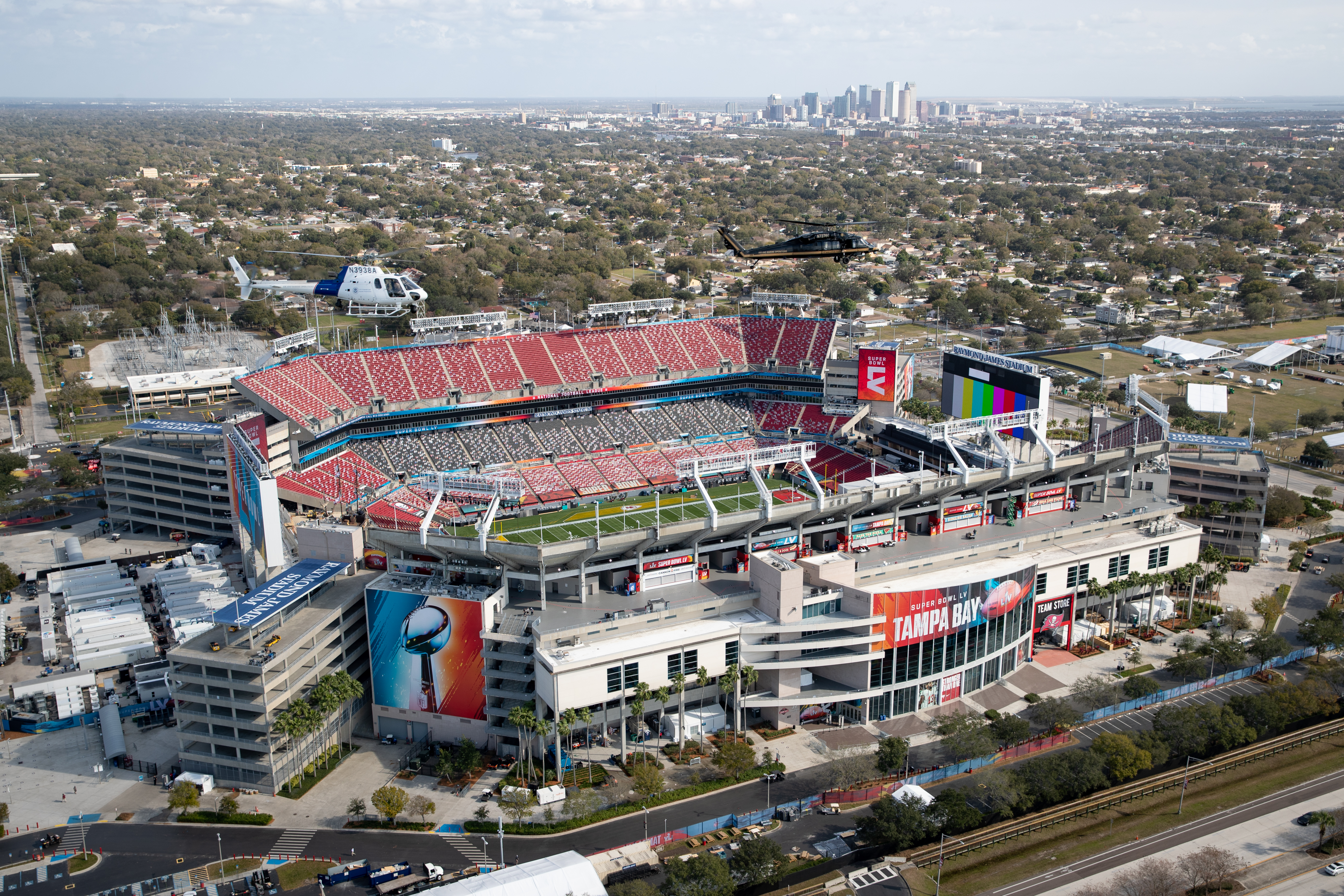
Raymond James Stadium, decorated for Super Bowl LV, January 31, 2021

On May 19, 2015, the league announced the four finalists for hosting Super Bowl LIII in 2019 and Super Bowl LIV in 2020. NFL team owners voted on these cities on May 24, 2016, with the first round of voting determining the host for Super Bowl LIII, and the second round deciding the site for Super Bowl LIV. In a development not known in advance, a third round of voting was added to select a Super Bowl LV hosting site. Atlanta and Miami were awarded Super Bowls LIII and LIV respectively, removing them from the running for LV. Los Angeles was not eligible for Super Bowl LIII, as their stadium was under construction and would not yet be finished; it was eligible for LIV and LV, and opted to bid only on the latter.

The two candidates were:

- Raymond James Stadium, Tampa, Florida: Tampa had hosted four Super Bowls, the last being Super Bowl XLIII in 2009.
- SoFi Stadium, Inglewood, California: Los Angeles had hosted the Super Bowl seven times, most recently in 1993 with Super Bowl XXVII; that game, along with the four prior Super Bowls in the area, was held at the Rose Bowl while the first two Super Bowls in the Los Angeles area were held at the Los Angeles Memorial Coliseum.

Los Angeles was originally chosen as the host site for Super Bowl LV in a vote on May 24, 2016. However, due to construction delays, authorities announced that the stadium would not be completed until the start of the 2020 NFL season. On May 23, 2017, NFL owners voted unanimously, with the Rams' approval, to move Super Bowl LV to Tampa. The City of Inglewood instead hosted Super Bowl LVI in 2022.

=== Impact of the COVID-19 pandemic ===
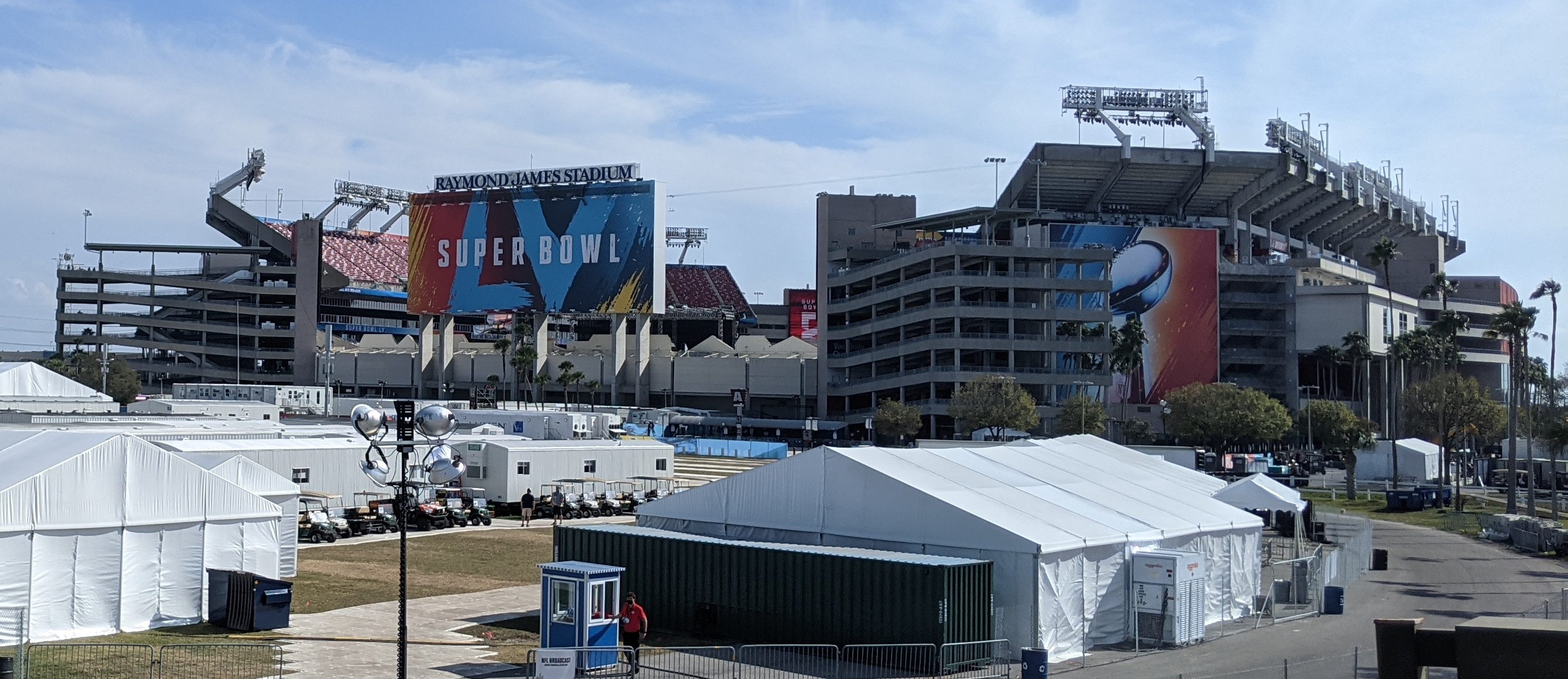
Outside Raymond James Stadium, one week prior to Super Bowl LV

As of the start of the 2020 NFL season, the league had forbidden on-field entertainment, such as halftime shows and national anthem performances at games with fans. These elements, which have historically been cornerstones of the Super Bowl entertainment, would have been produced off-site had restrictions remained in place. In case a COVID-19 outbreak forced the postponements of regular season and playoff games, the league stated that Super Bowl LV could have been delayed as far as February 28.

The state of Florida removed capacity restrictions for sporting events in October, although the three Florida-based teams have voluntarily maintained 20–25% capacity limits. As of late October 2020, the NFL was planning a minimum attendance of 20% of capacity, in hopes that a larger capacity would be possible by game day.

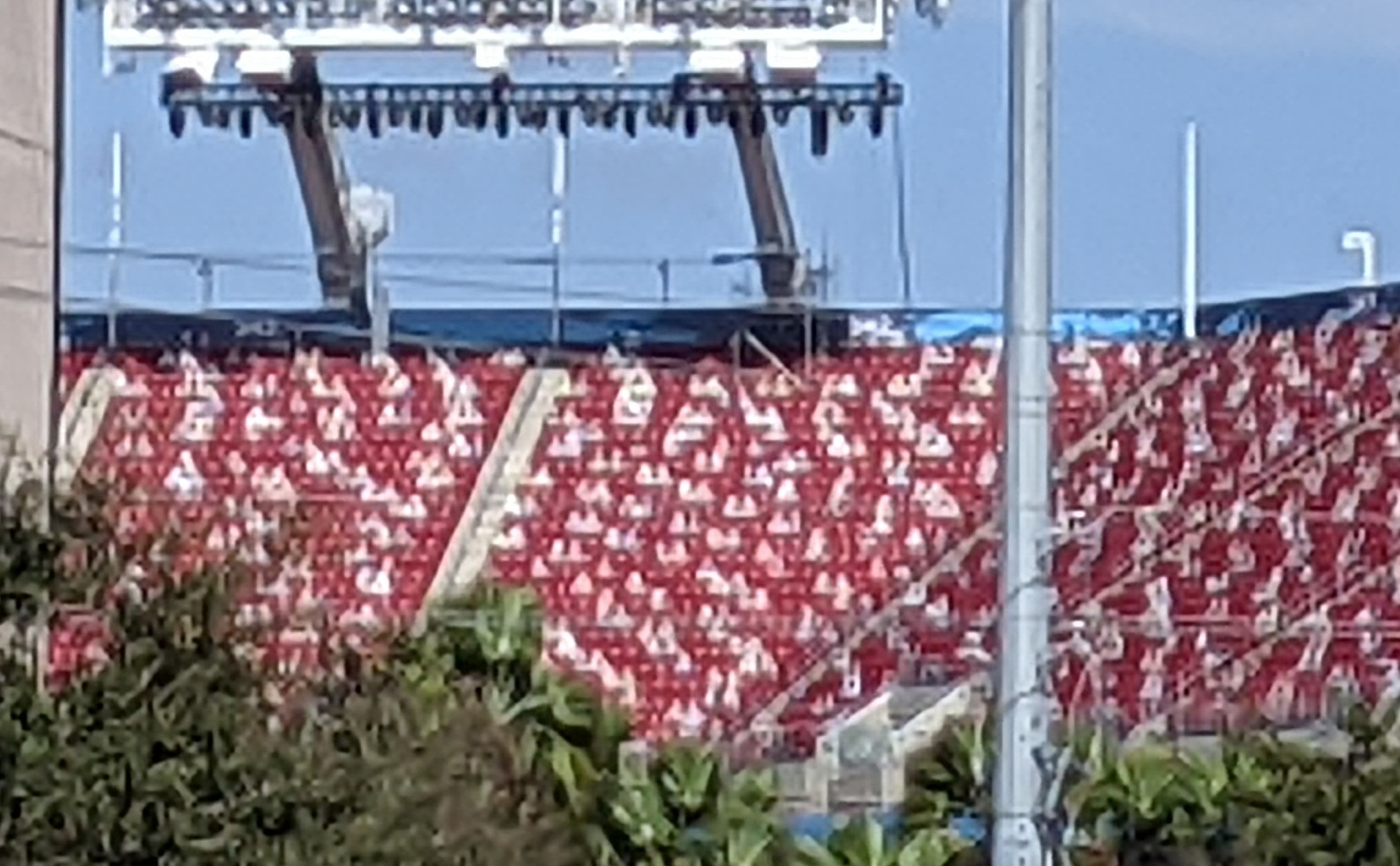
Cardboard cutouts of fans can be seen in the stands, one week before the game

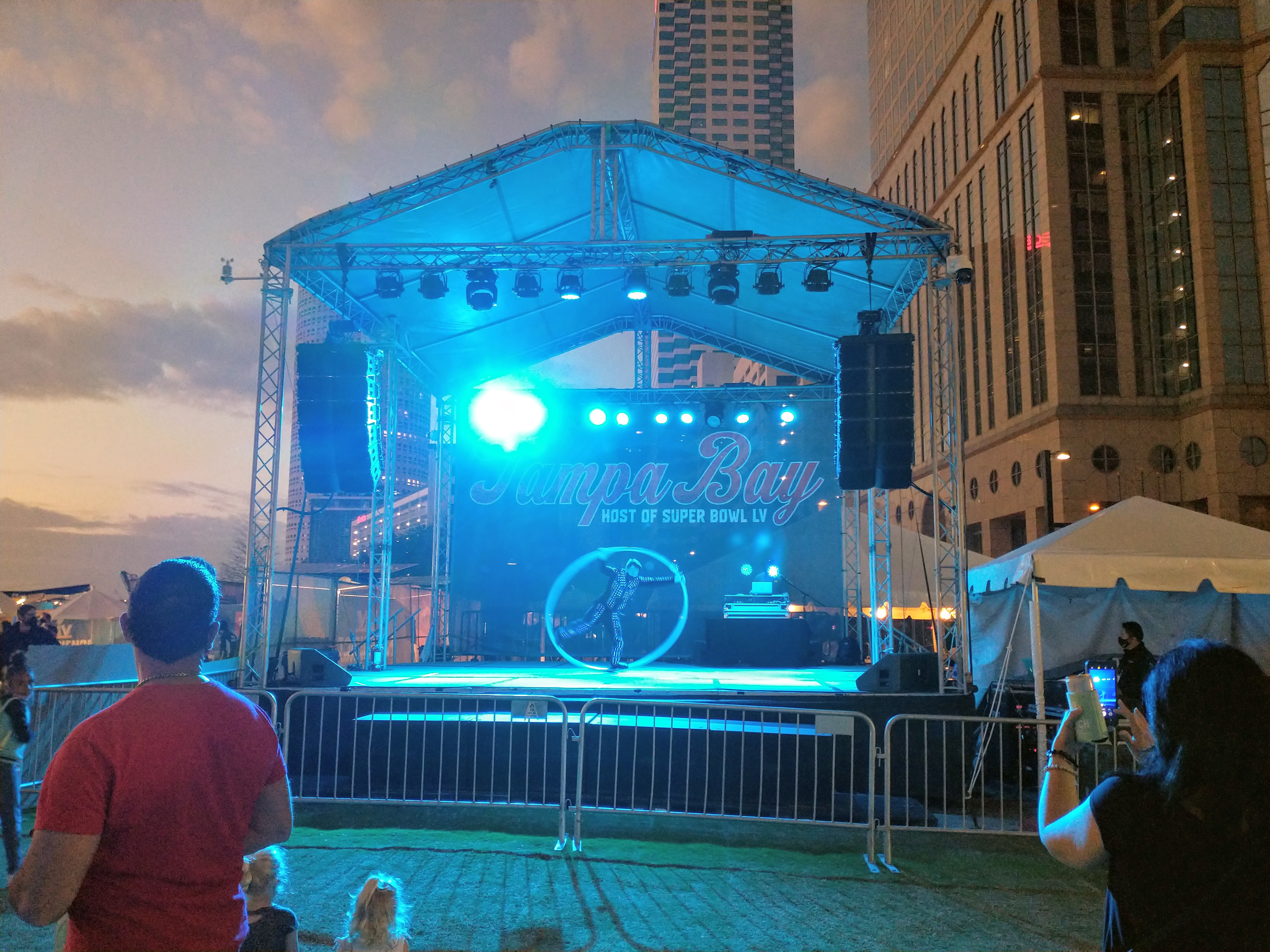
Entertainment at the NFL Super Bowl LV Experience along the Tampa Riverwalk.

On January 22, 2021, the NFL had originally announced that the game would have 22,000 fans in attendance, 7,500 of whom would be health care workers who had received a COVID-19 vaccine, primarily from the Tampa and central Florida region. The NFL also filled in the empty seats by selling 30,000 cardboard cutouts to fans. On February 2, the league increased the expected attendance to 25,000. Super Bowl LV was the least-attended NFL championship game since 1949, where 22,245 attended because of weather.

NFL protocols for the 2020 season required that the closest rows of seats be blocked with tarps to reduce spectator proximity to the field. For the Super Bowl, they were covered with additional LED video boards.

The traditional events held during Super Bowl week were significantly reduced. Capacity at the Super Bowl Experience at Julian B. Lane Riverfront Park was limited due to health and safety protocols. Instead of holding practices and participating in media events during the entire week in the Super Bowl host city, the Chiefs flew into Tampa on the day before the game as they had during the regular season (had another NFC team advanced to the Super Bowl instead of the Buccaneers, they would have done this as well). The "Super Bowl Opening Night" festivities on the Monday preceding the game were cancelled and replaced with a virtual media availability.

In March, health officials in Hillsborough County, Florida determined that Super Bowl LV was not a superspreader event. The officials cited 53 cases (out of 14,809 confirmed cases overall in a one-month span surrounding the game) that were traced to official Super Bowl events, three of those being people who attended the game itself; they also noted that unofficial house parties were likely far greater causes of spread during that time span.

== Teams ==
=== Kansas City Chiefs ===
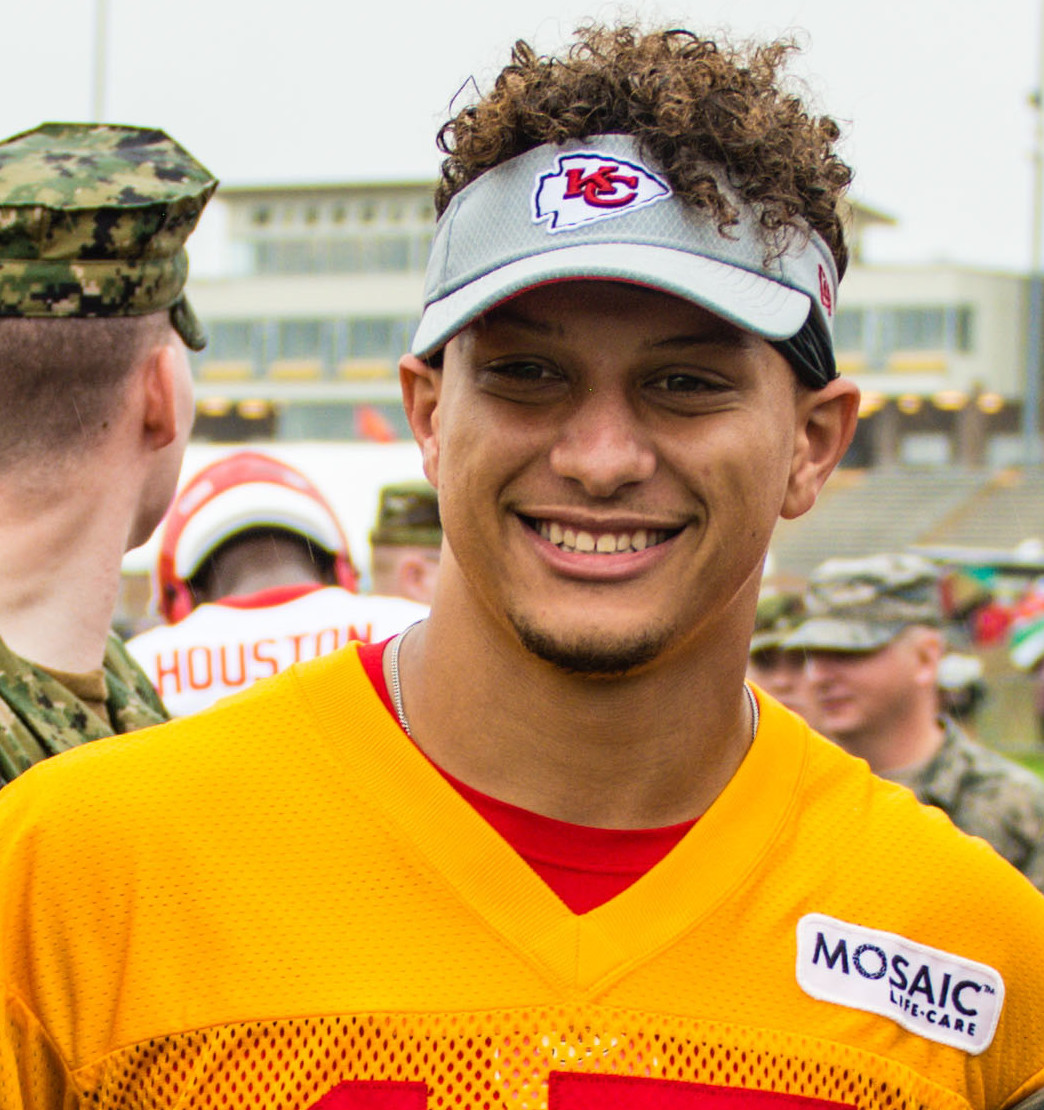
Chiefs quarterback Patrick Mahomes was looking to lead Kansas City to consecutive Super Bowl titles

As defending Super Bowl Champions, the Kansas City Chiefs recorded an NFL-best 14–2 record in 2020 under eighth-year head coach Andy Reid. Other than a 40–32 loss against the Las Vegas Raiders in week 5, their only defeat was by a 38-21 score in the final game of the season against the Los Angeles Chargers, when they rested most of their starters because they had already clinched the No. 1 seed in the playoffs. This appearance was the Chiefs' fourth trip to the Super Bowl. They lost Super Bowl I (1967), but won Super Bowls IV (1970) and LIV (2020).

Kansas City's offense ranked first in the NFL in yards (6,653) and sixth in points scored (473). Quarterback Patrick Mahomes made the Pro Bowl for the third consecutive season, throwing for 4,740 yards (second in the league) and 38 touchdowns, with only six interceptions, while also finishing the season as Kansas City's second leading rusher with a career high 308 yards and two scores. His main target was Pro Bowl tight end Travis Kelce, who caught 105 passes for 1,416 yards and 11 touchdowns, making him the NFL's second leading receiver and setting a new league record for receiving yards by a tight end. Pro Bowl receiver Tyreek Hill had 87 receptions for 1,276 yards and 15 touchdowns, while also rushing for 132 yards and two touchdowns. Mahomes also had receivers Demarcus Robinson (45 receptions for 466 yards), Mecole Hardman (41 reception for 561 yards and 360 return yards on special teams), and Sammy Watkins (37 receptions for 421 yards). The team's leading rusher from 2019, Damien Williams, opted out of the 2020 season due to COVID-19 concerns and because his mother had recently been diagnosed with Stage IV cancer. In his place, rookie running back Clyde Edwards-Helaire stepped up to fill the void, rushing for 808 yards and four touchdowns, while also catching 36 passes for 297 yards and another touchdown. Tackle Eric Fisher led the Chiefs offensive line, earning a Pro Bowl selection. However, he was forced to miss the Super Bowl after suffering a torn achilles tendon in the AFC championship game. Laurent Duvernay-Tardif, a starting guard for the 2019 season, was first NFL player to announce he would not play the season because of COVID-19, instead working as an orderly at a Montreal long-term care facility during the pandemic. On special teams, kicker Harrison Butker made 25-of-27 field goals, including all four of his attempts from over 50 yards.

The Chiefs defense was ranked 16th in the league in yards allowed (5,733). The Chiefs defensive line was led by Pro Bowl selections Chris Jones (7 1/2 sacks and two forced fumbles) and Frank Clark (6 sacks). Linebacker Anthony Hitchens ranked second on the team with 78 tackles. Kansas City's secondary was led by Pro Bowl strong safety Tyrann Mathieu (68 tackles, six interceptions, and one fumble recovery) and free safety Daniel Sorensen (91 tackles, three interceptions, and two forced fumbles).

=== Tampa Bay Buccaneers ===
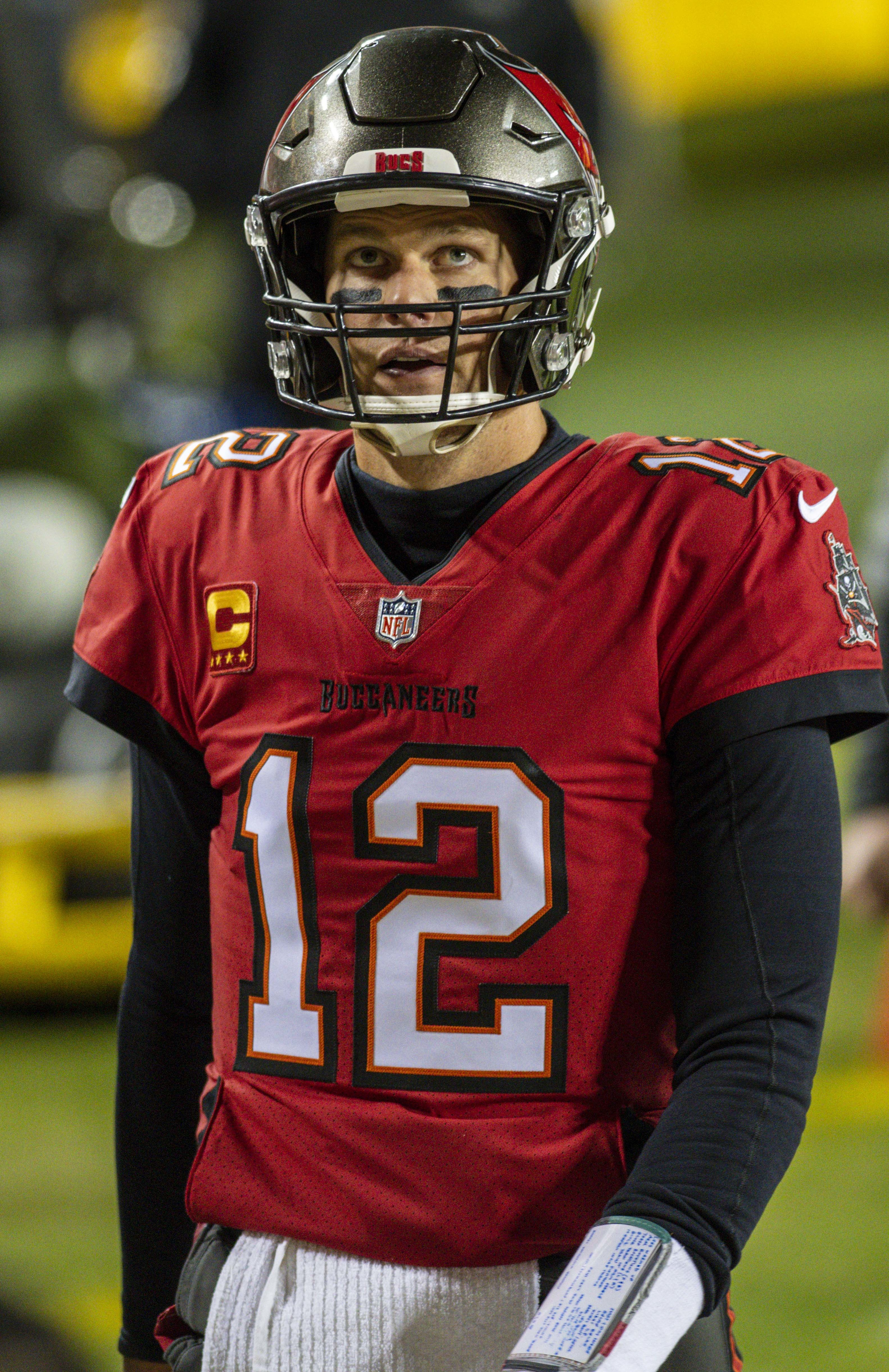
Buccaneers quarterback Tom Brady became the Super Bowl's oldest player at age 43

The Tampa Bay Buccaneers finished the 2020 season with an 11–5 record under second-year head coach Bruce Arians. Prior to this, the team had not won a playoff game since Super Bowl XXXVII in 2003 and had not made the playoffs since 2007–08. The team also recorded only three winning seasons since 2008 and had gone 7–9 the previous year.

During the 2020 off-season, the Buccaneers chose not to re-sign quarterback Jameis Winston, whom they selected first overall in 2015. To replace Winston, they made arguably the biggest off-season acquisition by signing 20-year veteran Tom Brady, one of the NFL's most decorated players. The signing marked the first time that Brady would play for a team other than the New England Patriots, where he was considered the offensive engine of the franchise's dynasty. Tight end Rob Gronkowski, Brady's teammate in New England and considered one of the greatest in his position, was lured out of retirement and acquired through a trade with the Patriots. Further off-season acquisitions included running back Leonard Fournette, running back LeSean McCoy, and placekicker Ryan Succop. In the 2020 NFL draft, Tampa Bay bolstered their offensive line by selecting tackle Tristan Wirfs 13th overall. After Week 6, they signed accomplished, but controversial wide receiver Antonio Brown, who had been out of the league for over a year.

Tampa Bay's offense was ranked seventh in league yards (6,145) and third in points scored (492). The 43-year old Brady threw for 4,633 yards and 40 touchdowns, 12 interceptions and rushed for three touchdowns. His main targets were Mike Evans who caught 70 passes for 1,006 yards and 13 touchdowns, Chris Godwin who caught 65 passes for 840 yards and seven touchdowns, and Rob Gronkowski who caught 45 passes for 623 yards and seven touchdowns. Brady also had other receivers to go to with Scotty Miller (33 passes, 501 yards and three touchdowns), Antonio Brown (44 catches, 483 yards and four touchdowns), and Cameron Brate (28 catches, 282 yards and two touchdowns). Ronald Jones was the team's leading rusher with 978 yards and seven touchdowns, while also catching 28 passes for 165 yards and another touchdown. Leonard Fournette also added 367 rushing yards and six touchdowns, while also hauling in 36 passes. Kicker Ryan Succop ranked sixth in the NFL with 136 points, making 28-of-31 field goal attempts.

Tampa Bay's defense was ranked sixth in the league in yardage allowed (5,234). The defensive line was anchored by defensive ends Ndamukong Suh (six sacks) and William Gholston (20 quarterback hits and eight tackles for loss). The line was also aided by edge rushing outside linebackers Jason Pierre-Paul, the team's lone Pro Bowl selection (9 1/2 sacks, four forced fumbles, two fumble recoveries), and Shaquil Barrett (eight sacks and two force fumbles). The team also had linebackers Devin White (140 tackles and nine sacks) and Lavonte David (117 tackles and three forced fumbles). Cornerback Carlton Davis led the team with four interceptions, while rookie safety Antoine Winfield Jr. added 94 tackles, one interception, and three sacks.

=== Playoffs ===
The Chiefs won the AFC West division title for a fifth consecutive year and the top seed in the AFC playoffs with a league-best 14–2 record. After clinching a first-round bye, the Chiefs defeated the Cleveland Browns 22–17 in the Divisional round to send them to their third straight AFC Championship Game. They then won 38–24 over the Buffalo Bills for their second straight Lamar Hunt Trophy. However, the victories proved costly. In the divisional round, quarterback Patrick Mahomes suffered a turf toe injury before being removed in the third quarter due to a concussion. The former continued to afflict Mahomes entering the Super Bowl, with him required to undergo toe surgery after the game. Additionally, left tackle Eric Fisher departed the conference championship with a torn Achilles, forcing him to miss the Super Bowl. The loss of Fisher compounded the Chiefs' offensive line troubles, as right tackle Mitchell Schwartz had been lost earlier in the season with a back injury.

Meanwhile, the Buccaneers finished as the fifth seed and second place in the NFC South with an 11–5 record. They were the first team under quarterback Tom Brady to reach the playoffs as a wild card. In the wild-card round, the Buccaneers defeated the Washington Football Team 31–23, to advance to the divisional round against the New Orleans Saints, who had swept them in the regular season. The Buccaneers then defeated the Saints 30–20 to advance to the NFC Championship Game. The Buccaneers then upset the top-seeded Green Bay Packers in the NFC Championship Game 31–26 advancing to the Super Bowl. The Buccaneers became the fifth team to win three away games en route to the Super Bowl. They also became the first team to make the Super Bowl as a Wild Card team since the 2010 Green Bay Packers. The Buccaneers became the first team to play and win a Super Bowl in its home stadium, and only the third to play in their home metro area (alongside the 1979 Los Angeles Rams and 1984 San Francisco 49ers).

This was the final Super Bowl in the 16-game schedule era, which began with the 1978 NFL season. The following season, the NFL went to a 17-game schedule.

=== Pre-game notes ===
The Buccaneers were the designated home team for Super Bowl LV, as the home team alternates between the two conferences annually. The fact that the Buccaneers were designated as the "home" team in their home stadium was a coincidence. As the designated home team, the Buccaneers elected to wear their white jerseys with pewter pants. The Chiefs wore their red jerseys with white pants.

Even though the game was played in the Buccaneers' home stadium, the league treated this as a neutral site game. The Buccaneers were only allowed to fire the cannons from the stadium's signature pirate ship for player introductions and after the end of the game, but not during every scoring play and when the offense enters the red zone as they usually would. In addition, the stadium decor including the replica pirate ship sails were accordingly changed from Buccaneers' logos to those promoting the Super Bowl.

Gambling establishments had the Chiefs as three-point favorites and projected 57 points scored.

The Chiefs and Buccaneers played each other during the regular season. The Chiefs won the Week 12 game in Tampa, 27–24. This marked the 14th time the Super Bowl featured a rematch of a regular season game and the first time this has happened since Super Bowl XLVI in 2012.

This was the first time that both Super Bowl starting quarterbacks – Patrick Mahomes and Tom Brady – have won the AP NFL MVP and Super Bowl MVP awards; as Brady is Mahomes' senior by 18 years, some billed the matchup as comparable to Michael Jordan versus LeBron James.

Since the Buccaneers reached the Super Bowl, Tampa was nicknamed "Champa Bay", as all three of the area's major professional sports teams had made their league's championship round during the past five months; A few months prior, the Tampa Bay Lightning had won the 2020 Stanley Cup Finals, while the Tampa Bay Rays had advanced to but lost the 2020 World Series.

With Buccaneers head coach Bruce Arians aged 68 and Chiefs head coach Andy Reid aged 62, Super Bowl LV set the record for the oldest combined age between both coaches.

Chiefs linebackers coach Britt Reid, the son of head coach Andy Reid, was involved in a car accident on February 4, 2021. Two young children were injured in the crash. The younger Reid admitted to consuming two to three alcoholic drinks and being on Adderall, a prescription medication, while driving. He did not coach in the game.

In addition to becoming the first team to play a Super Bowl in their home stadium, the Buccaneers became the first non-California team to play in a Super Bowl in their home state. The previous instances of teams with a home-state advantage were the Oakland Raiders (Super Bowl XI at Pasadena and Super Bowl XXXVII at San Diego), Rams (Super Bowl XIV at Pasadena) and 49ers (Super Bowl XIX at Stanford).

== Broadcasting ==
=== United States ===
==== Television ====
Super Bowl LV was televised by CBS. Although NBC was to air this game under the current rotation, they traded the game to CBS in exchange for Super Bowl LVI, which fell during the 2022 Winter Olympics and is the first to be scheduled during an ongoing Olympic Games, and the second time that it fell on an Olympic Year (this also upheld a gentleman's agreement between the NFL's broadcasters not to counterprogram the Super Bowl, as NBC also holds the U.S. broadcast rights to the Olympics). This trade was reminiscent of NBC trading Super Bowl XXVI to CBS for Super Bowl XXVII to allow CBS a strong lead-in to its coverage of the 1992 Winter Olympics.

CBS, to an extent, also benefited from holding rights to the Super Bowl in the same year that it held the rights to the NCAA Final Four, which is cycled with WarnerMedia Entertainment channels on a two-year cycle with TBS, as well as the AFC Championship Game in primetime, which contractually alternates between afternoon and primetime on a two-year cycle with the NFC Championship Game on Fox.

CBS used 120 cameras in total, including ten 4K cameras, two 8K cameras, a crane camera, a Trolley Cam running parallel with the field, and two Sony Venice cameras that were used to produce cinematic and "3D-like" scenes reminiscent of video games. Production was decentralized due to COVID-19 protocols, with some production duties being conducted remotely from the CBS Broadcast Center in New York City and at individual employees' homes. CBS officially introduced a rebranding of the CBS Sports division during Super Bowl LV, as part of a larger reimaging and standardization of CBS and its main divisions.

Building upon its involvement in a youth-oriented broadcast of one of the Wild Card games, Nickelodeon contributed family-oriented social media content, including "Nick-ified" highlight videos with similar augmented reality effects to the aforementioned Wild Card broadcast (and featured during a highlights package seen on the CBS broadcast at halftime). Nickelodeon also aired a half-hour preview special for the game, and an NFL-themed edition of Unfiltered aired as a segment during CBS's pre-game show The Super Bowl Today.

This was third and final Super Bowl televised by CBS in which ESPN Deportes aired the Spanish-language broadcast. Unlike NBC and Fox, CBS does not have a Spanish-language network. The sublicense for CBS's next Super Bowl broadcast, Super Bowl LVIII was sold to Univision.

===== Lead-out programs =====
On December 3, 2020, CBS announced that its lead-out program would be the series premiere of The Equalizer. After late local programs, CBS also aired a special Sunday-night episode of The Late Show with Stephen Colbert.

===== Advertising =====
The estimated cost of a 30-second commercial at Super Bowl LV remained steady with 2020, with CBS reportedly charging around $5.5 million. The economic impact of COVID-19 prompted some brands to skip the game, including Avocados from Mexico, Budweiser (its first absence in 37 years), Coca-Cola, Hyundai, and Pepsi (focusing more on its halftime show sponsorship). Budweiser announced that it would donate the estimated cost of a Super Bowl ad to the Ad Council to fund public service announcements for COVID-19 vaccination. However, parent company Anheuser-Busch still aired commercials for other brands during the game (with a spend in line with that of Super Bowl LIV), including Bud Light, Bud Light Seltzer, and Michelob Ultra, as well as its first-ever corporate spot, directed by filmmaker David Fincher.

Companies such as DraftKings, Fiverr, Logitech, and Vroom made their Super Bowl debut as advertisers. Reddit ran a five-second ad in nine of the top ten media markets, saying that was all it could afford.

Amazon Studios and Universal Pictures aired commercials for upcoming films during the game, including Coming 2 America and Old. Disney aired commercials for its upcoming films and Disney+ series. CBS promoted the upcoming relaunch of its subscription streaming service CBS All Access as Paramount+.

==== Streaming ====
The game was streamed on CBS All Access (whose then-upcoming relaunch as Paramount+ in March 2021 was promoted during the game), CBSSports.com, and the CBS Sports mobile app.

It was also available with exclusive camera angles through the NFL mobile app and Yahoo! Sports mobile app. Viewers with an iPhone 12 who were in the stadium could see seven exclusive angles, and viewers at home could see five.

==== Ratings ====
Around 91.6 million viewers watched Super Bowl LV on linear television, an 8% decline over Super Bowl LIV and the least-watched game since 2006. CBS reported a total of 96.4 million viewers when combined with viewership of the Spanish-language broadcast and digital platforms, a 5% year-over-year decline overall. CBS reported an average of 5.7 million streaming viewers per-minute, a 69% increase year-over-year that made it the most-streamed Super Bowl to-date.

=== International ===
In Canada, CTV and TSN televised this game in English and RDS in French. As with the 2020 edition, CTV invoked simultaneous substitution over U.S. network signals (including ads) distributed in Canada, as a CRTC ban on such substitutions during the Super Bowl had been overturned by a December 2019 Supreme Court of Canada decision.

In the United Kingdom and Ireland, the game was televised on the free-to-air channel BBC One and paid-subscription channel Sky One (as well as its sister channels Sky Sports Main Event and NFL). It was carried on radio via BBC Radio 5 Live. In Germany, Austria and Switzerland, free-to-air channel ProSieben broadcast the event through its ran format; 2.2 million Germans watched the game, which encouraged the NFL to further consider adding Germany to the International Series in the future. In Belgium and Portugal the game was televised by paid-subscription channel Eleven Sports. In Poland the game was broadcast on the free-to-air channel TVP Sport, marking the first time an NFL game was available on a Polish open channel.

Subscription streaming platform DAZN also streamed the Super Bowl in several countries including Canada, Germany, and Japan. In Australia, the game was broadcast by Melbourne radio station 1116 SEN and commentated by Gerard Whateley

== Entertainment ==
=== Pre-game ceremonies ===
A special pre-game concert for the invited health care workers attending the game—the TikTok Tailgate—was held in the afternoon prior to Super Bowl LV, and was headlined by Miley Cyrus, with guest appearances by Joan Jett and Billy Idol. Portions were aired during CBS's pre-game show, while the full concert was streamed on the TikTok app. While performing her song "Wrecking Ball", Cyrus broke down and said that it "never gets easier".

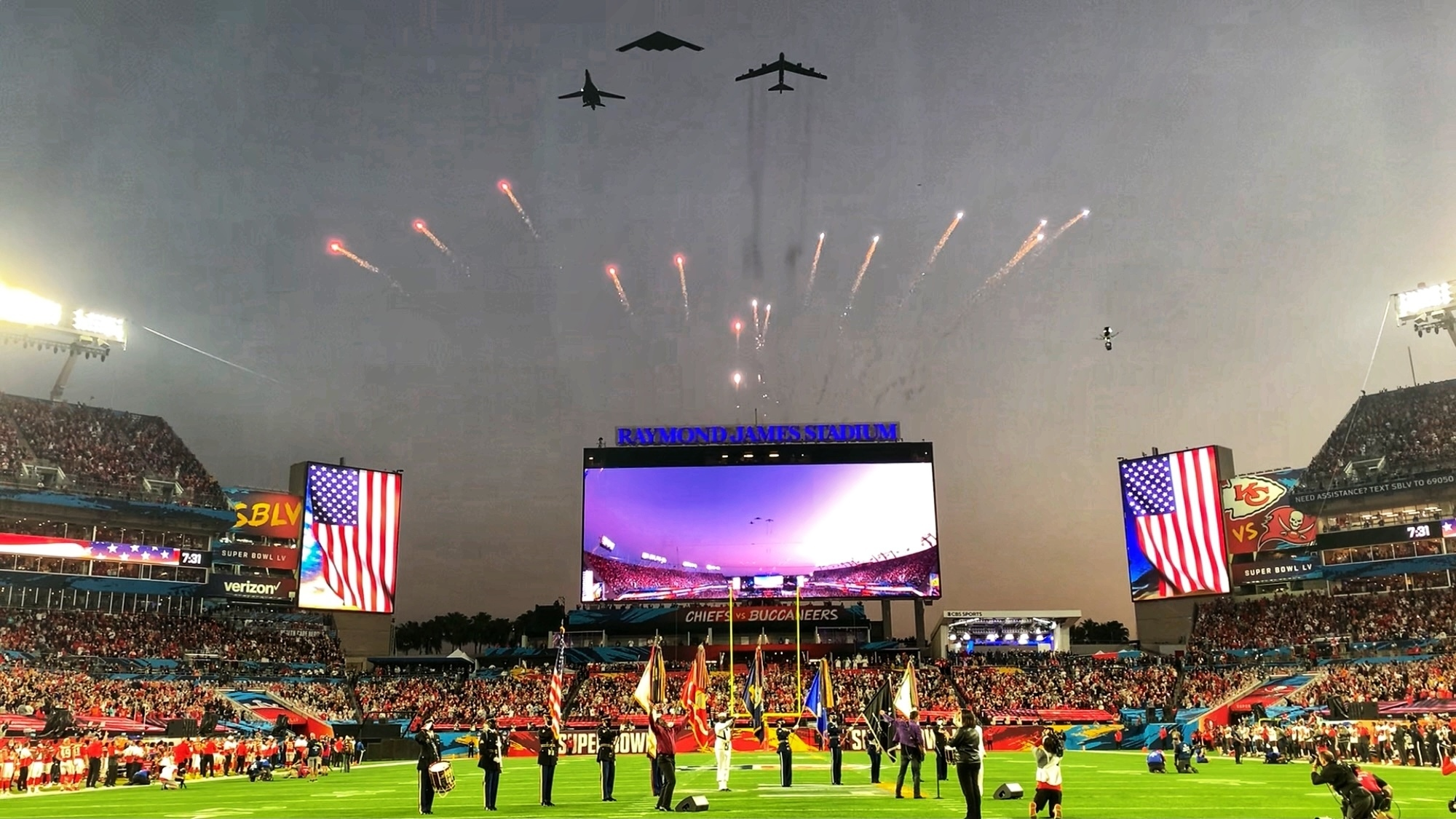
The U.S. Armed Forces Color Guard salutes as the U.S. Air Force flyover crosses the Raymond James Stadium at Super Bowl LV in Tampa, Florida, Feb. 7, 2021. US Air Force B-1B Lancer, B-2 Spirit and B-52 Stratofortress fly over the stadium at the end of the anthem. U.S. Army photo by Maj. Stephen Von Jett.

A pre-game segment addressing racial unrest in the United States and the NFL's Inspire Change campaign featured a pre-recorded performance of "Lift Every Voice and Sing" by Alicia Keys from the Los Angeles Memorial Coliseum. National Youth Poet Laureate Amanda Gorman recited an original poem recognizing the game's three honorary captains participating in the coin toss ceremony, representing essential workers during the COVID-19 pandemic: Los Angeles teacher Trimaine Davis, Tampa nurse Suzie Dorner and Marine veteran James Martin.

R&B singer H.E.R. performed "America the Beautiful", and country music singer Eric Church and R&B singer Jazmine Sullivan performed "The Star-Spangled Banner". This was the second time that the national anthem was sung as a duet in a Super Bowl, the first time being in 2006. At the end of the national anthem, a flyover was performed by the United States Air Force consisting of their three strategic bombers currently in active service: The Rockwell B-1 Lancer, the Northrop B-2 Spirit, and the Boeing B-52 Stratofortress.

=== Halftime show ===
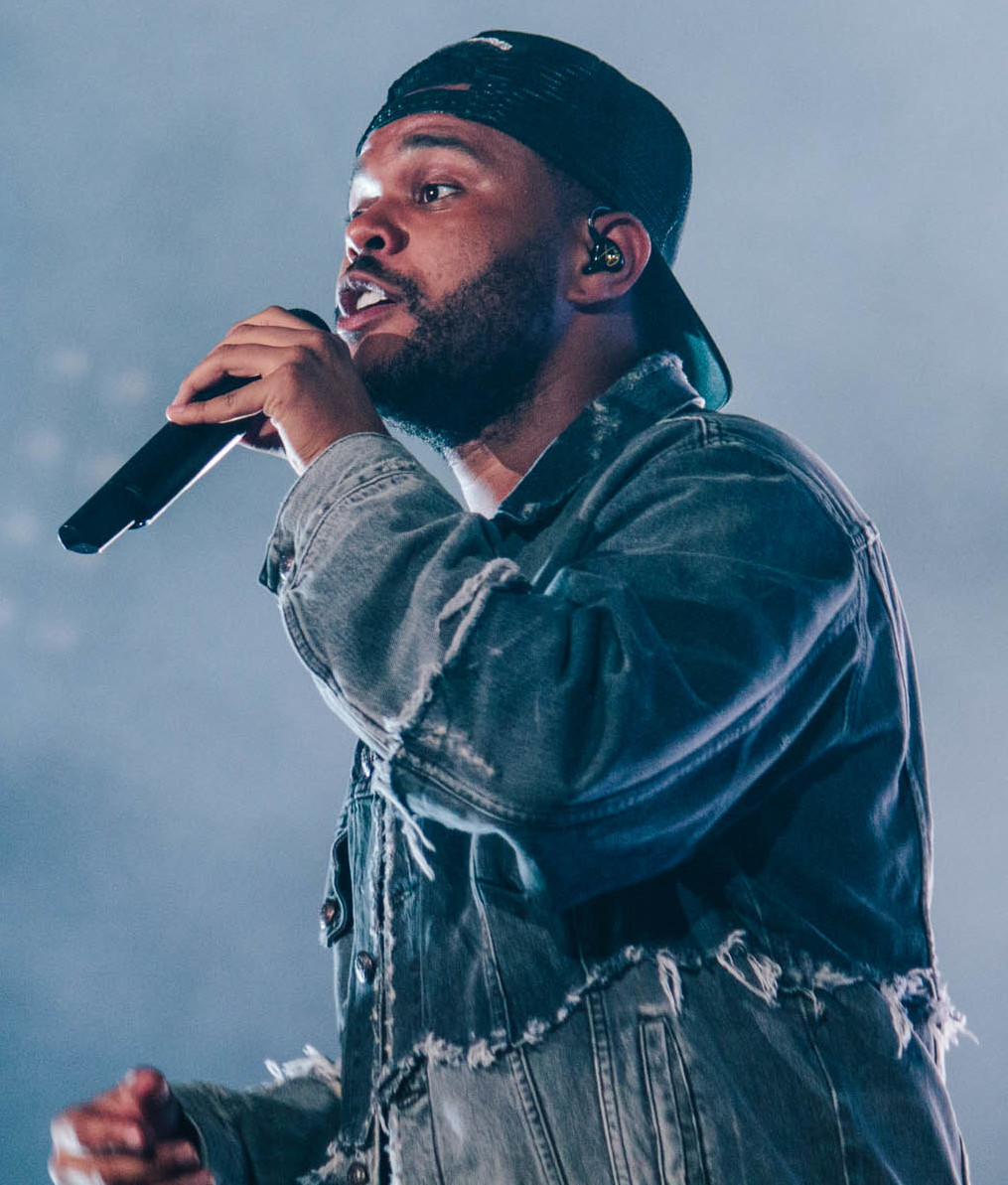
The Weeknd headlined the halftime show, making it the first Canadian artist to headline a Super Bowl halftime show

The halftime show was headlined by the Weeknd making him the first Canadian artist to headline the halftime show. Dave Meyers was the show's executive producer, while Roc Nation produced and creatively directed. Additionally, Hamish Hamilton directed the performance. The show featured a number of his hit songs, including "Can't Feel My Face", "Earned It", and "Blinding Lights", among others.

It was reported that he had spent US$7 million of his own money on the show, which featured men dressed in all black with red jackets and bandages on their face as backup dancers. The halftime show garnered mixed reviews from critics, noting that while the logistical side of the performance was impressive, the lack of guest performers and the poor audio mixing were heavy drawbacks to the occasion.

For the first time since the Super Bowl XLIV halftime show, there was no crowd of fans surrounding the halftime stage. This has continued for subsequent Super Bowl halftime shows.

== Game summary ==
=== First half ===
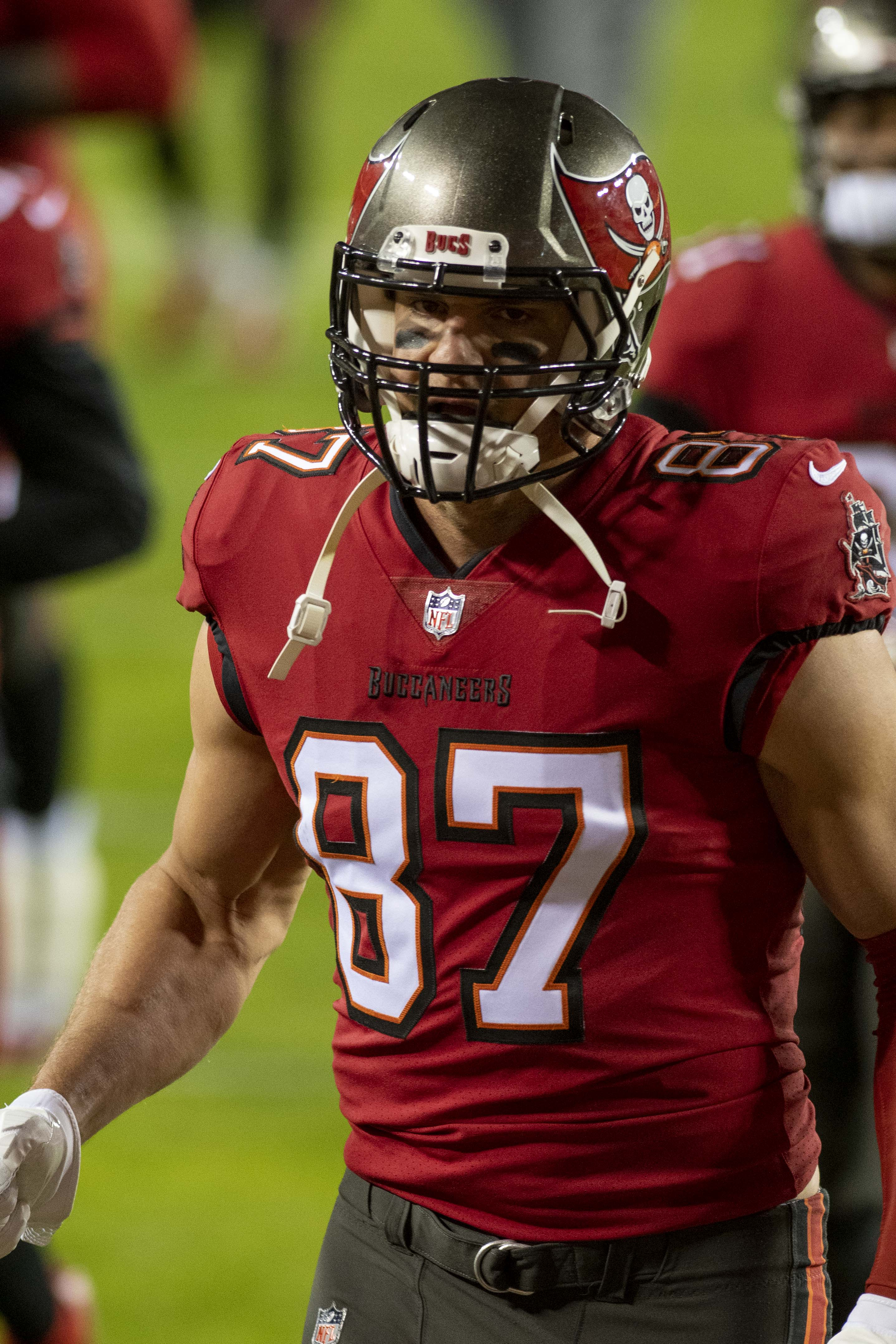
Buccaneers tight end Rob Gronkowski caught two touchdown passes in the first half.

The Chiefs won the coin toss and deferred possession to the second half. After the first three drives ended in punts, Kansas City's ensuing drive took them 31 yards in eight plays, culminating in a 49-yard field goal by kicker Harrison Butker to take a 3–0 lead. The Buccaneers responded with an eight-play, 75-yard drive, with running back Leonard Fournette rushing four times for 26 yards, while quarterback Tom Brady completed back-to-back passes to wide receiver Antonio Brown and tight end Cameron Brate for gains of 16 and 15 yards, respectively. Brady ended the drive with an 8-yard touchdown pass to tight end Rob Gronkowski, giving Tampa Bay a 7–3 lead. This was the 13th postseason touchdown pass from Brady to Gronkowski, setting a new record for touchdowns between the same quarterback/receiver duo, which they had previously shared with San Francisco 49ers players Joe Montana and Jerry Rice. It was also the first time in Brady's Super Bowl appearances that he threw a touchdown pass in the first quarter. The Chiefs were forced to a three-and-out to start the second quarter, and the Buccaneers took over on their own 30-yard line following the punt.

Following back-to-back runs for 15 yards by running back Ronald Jones II, Brady's 31-yard completion to wide receiver Mike Evans set up 1st-and-goal for the Buccaneers at the Kansas City 6-yard line. However, the Chiefs' defense made a stand at their goal line. Jones picked up 4 yards, but then Brady threw a pass that was dropped by offensive tackle Joe Haeg, who lined up in the tight end position, with linebacker Anthony Hitchens knocking the ball out of Haeg's hands. On third down, Jones was stopped short of the goal line and again on fourth down, which was challenged by Tampa Bay and upheld, giving the ball to Kansas City on their own 1-yard line. The Chiefs managed to pick up 16 yards on their ensuing possession before being forced to punt again. Tommy Townsend punted deep into Tampa Bay territory, but a holding call on Chiefs linebacker Ben Niemann forced Townsend to punt again. His follow-up punt went out-of-bounds at the Kansas City 38-yard line, for a net of only 29 yards. The Buccaneers' ensuing drive was aided by two significant penalties. First, an interception by safety Tyrann Mathieu was negated by a defensive holding penalty against cornerback Charvarius Ward. Later, after Kansas City stopped Tampa Bay on 3rd-and-5, Chiefs cornerback Antonio Hamilton was called for defensive offside during a 40-yard field goal attempt by kicker Ryan Succop, giving the Buccaneers a new set of downs. On the next play, Brady threw a 17-yard touchdown pass to Gronkowski, increasing the Buccaneers' lead to 14–3. Kansas City responded by moving the ball 61 yards in 10 plays, with quarterback Patrick Mahomes completing four passes to tight end Travis Kelce for 41 yards and rushing for 10. Butker finished the possession with another field goal, a 34-yarder, making the score 14–6. Tampa Bay's final first half drive began on their own 29-yard line with just over a minute left in the half, and mounted a 71-yard drive in five plays, the longest a 15-yard catch by Fournette. The Buccaneers were aided by two pass interference calls: a 34-yard penalty against cornerback Bashaud Breeland, who was covering Evans, and an 8-yard penalty against Mathieu in the end zone. On the next play, Brady completed a 1-yard touchdown pass to Brown, increasing Tampa Bay's lead to 21–6 with six seconds to play. Mahomes then took a knee to end the half. All told, in the first half the Chiefs were penalized eight times for 95 yards, the most penalties called on any team in one half in any game of the 2020–21 NFL season, while the Buccaneers were flagged for one five-yard penalty.

=== Second half ===
On the opening play of the second half, Chiefs running back Clyde Edwards-Helaire rushed for a 26-yard gain. He also had a 10-yard run on the drive, which went for 47 yards in seven plays and concluded with Butker's 52-yard field goal, cutting Kansas City's deficit to 21–9 and putting them only two touchdowns away from taking the lead. However, the Buccaneers took complete control of the second half and held the Chiefs scoreless for the rest of the game. Tampa Bay responded with a six-play, 74-yard drive, featuring a 25-yard completion from Brady to Gronkowski (Brady's longest completion of the game). Fournette went the distance for a 27-yard touchdown run on the next play, increasing their lead to 28–9. Three plays into the Chiefs' next drive, safety Mike Edwards broke up a pass intended for wide receiver Tyreek Hill, which was intercepted by safety Antoine Winfield Jr. at the Kansas City 45-yard line. The Buccaneers then advanced to the 19-yard line, but on 3rd-and-10, center Ryan Jensen snapped the ball high above Brady's head, but Brady was able to recover the ball at the 34-yard line, resulting in a 15-yard loss on the play. However, the miscue did not affect them, as Succop ended the drive with a successful 52-yard field goal, capping off the scoring at 31–9. On Kansas City's next drive, which carried over into the fourth quarter, they advanced to the Tampa Bay 11-yard line with Mahomes completing four of six passes for 56 yards, the longest a 21-yard completion to Hill, but the Buccaneers forced a turnover on downs, stuffing a running play for a 1-yard gain and then forcing Mahomes to throw three straight incompletions, turning the ball over on downs with 13:32 left in the game.

The Kansas City defense forced Tampa Bay to punt for just the third time, allowing their offense to take the ball at their own 8-yard line. They got the ball across midfield, with Mahomes completing a 33-yard pass to Kelce, but turned the ball over on downs again at the Tampa Bay 27-yard line. The Buccaneers then went three-and-out and punted the ball to the Kansas City 42-yard line. The Chiefs drove the ball to the Tampa Bay 10-yard line, but Mahomes threw a pass that was intended for Kelce but was intercepted in the end zone for a touchback by linebacker Devin White with 1:33 left in the game. Brady then took three knees to run out the clock, sealing the 31–9 victory for Tampa Bay. Brady, who completed 21 of 29 passes for 201 yards and three touchdowns, won the Super Bowl Most Valuable Player Award for a record fifth time in his career.

Fournette was the game's leading rusher with 16 carries for 89 yards and a touchdown, while also catching four passes for 46 yards. Gronkowski, who caught only two passes in Tampa Bay's previous three postseason games, was the team's leading receiver with six receptions for 67 yards and two touchdowns. White had eight solo tackles (two for a loss), four assisted tackles, and an interception. Mahomes finished the day 26-of-49 for 270 yards and two interceptions, while also rushing for 33 yards. Mahomes was pressured on a Super Bowl record 29 of 56 dropbacks while also being sacked three times and hit twice, scrambling nearly 500 yards before throwing or taking a sack.

Kelce caught 10 passes for 133 yards, setting a new Super Bowl record for receiving yards by a tight end. Out of 110 Super Bowl teams, Kansas City became the third to finish the game without scoring a touchdown, joining the Miami Dolphins in Super Bowl VI and the Los Angeles Rams in Super Bowl LIII. Buccaneers coach Bruce Arians became the oldest coach to win a Super Bowl, at 68 years and 127 days, while the team became the first to score at least 30 points in four games during the same postseason.

=== Box score ===
Kansas City Chiefs vs. Tampa Bay Buccaneers—Game summary

Quarter	1	2	3	4	Total
Chiefs (AFC)	3	3	3	0	9
Buccaneers (NFC)	7	14	10	0	31

at Raymond James Stadium, Tampa, Florida

- Date: February 7, 2021
- Game time: 6:37 p.m. EST
- Game weather: Clear, 63 °F (17 °C)
- Game attendance: 24,835
- Referee: Carl Cheffers
- TV announcers (CBS): Jim Nantz, Tony Romo, Tracy Wolfson, Evan Washburn, Jay Feely and Gene Steratore
- Recap, Game Book

Scoring summary

Quarter	Time	Drive			Team	Scoring information	Score	
Quarter	Time	Plays	Yards	TOP	Team	Scoring information	KC	TB
1	5:10	8	31	3:23	KC	49-yard field goal by Harrison Butker	3	0
1	0:37	8	75	4:33	TB	Rob Gronkowski 8-yard touchdown reception from Tom Brady, Ryan Succop kick good	3	7
2	6:05	6	38	2:58	TB	Gronkowski 17-yard touchdown reception from Brady, Succop kick good	3	14
2	1:01	10	61	5:04	KC	34-yard field goal by Butker	6	14
2	0:06	5	71	0:55	TB	Antonio Brown 1-yard touchdown reception from Brady, Succop kick good	6	21
3	11:26	7	47	3:34	KC	52-yard field goal by Butker	9	21
3	7:45	6	74	3:41	TB	Leonard Fournette 27-yard touchdown run, Succop kick good	9	28
3	2:46	8	11	3:34	TB	52-yard field goal by Succop	9	31
"TOP" = time of possession. For other American football terms, see Glossary of American football.							9	31

== Final statistics ==
=== Statistical comparison ===
Team-to-team comparison
Statistic	Kansas City Chiefs	Tampa Bay Buccaneers
First downs	22	26
First downs rushing	12	12
First downs passing	7	8
First downs penalty	3	6
Third down efficiency	3–13	4–12
Fourth down efficiency	1–3	0–1
Total net yards	350	340
Net yards rushing	107	145
Rushing attempts	17	33
Yards per rush	6.3	4.4
Yards passing	243	195
Passing–completions/attempts	26/49	21/29
Times sacked–total yards	3–27	1–6
Interceptions thrown	2	0
Punt returns–total yards	1–0	0–0
Kickoff returns–total yards	3–87	3–75
Interceptions–total return yards	0–0	2–0
Punts–average yardage	3–35.7	4–37.5
Fumbles–lost	0–0	1–0
Penalties–yards	11–120	4–39
Time of possession	28:37	31:23
Turnovers	2	0

Records set (Unless noted as "NFL Championships" or "Pro Football History", all records refer only to Super Bowls)
Most appearances, player	10	Tom Brady (Tampa Bay)
Most appearances, starting player	10	Tom Brady (Tampa Bay)
Most NFL championships won, player	7	Tom Brady (Tampa Bay)
Most wins, player	7	Tom Brady (Tampa Bay)
Most Super Bowl MVPs, player	5	Tom Brady (Tampa Bay)
Most pass attempts, player (career)	421	Tom Brady (Tampa Bay)
Most pass completions, player (career)	277	Tom Brady (Tampa Bay)
Most passing yards, player (career)	3,039	Tom Brady (Tampa Bay)
Most touchdown passes, player (career)	21	Tom Brady (Tampa Bay)
Oldest quarterback, player	43 years, 188 days	Tom Brady (Tampa Bay)
Oldest quarterback, starting player	43 years, 188 days	Tom Brady (Tampa Bay)
Oldest quarterback, winning team	43 years, 188 days	Tom Brady (Tampa Bay)
Oldest player	43 years, 188 days	Tom Brady (Tampa Bay)
Oldest player, starting player	43 years, 188 days	Tom Brady (Tampa Bay)
Oldest player, winning team	43 years, 188 days	Tom Brady (Tampa Bay)
Oldest player to win Super Bowl MVP	43 years, 188 days	Tom Brady (Tampa Bay)
Most touchdowns, QB-receiver tandem (career)	5	Tom Brady-Rob Gronkowski (Tampa Bay)
Most receptions, tight end (career)	29	Rob Gronkowski (Tampa Bay)
Most receiving yards, tight end	133	Travis Kelce (Kansas City)
Oldest head coach, winning team	68 years, 325 days	Bruce Arians (Tampa Bay)
Most penalty yards in any half	95	Kansas City Chiefs
Most first downs by penalty, both teams	9	Tampa Bay (6) v. Kansas City (3)
Most first downs by penalty, team	6	Tampa Bay Buccaneers
Records tied
Most championships won in Pro Football history, player	7	Tom Brady (Tampa Bay)
Most fumbles, player (career)	5	Tom Brady (Tampa Bay)
Most teams with win, quarterback (career)	2	Tom Brady (Tampa Bay)
Most teams scoring touchdowns, player (career)	2	Rob Gronkowski (Tampa Bay)
Most fumbles recovered, player (career)	2	Patrick Mahomes (Kansas City)
Fewest touchdowns, team	0	Kansas City Chiefs
Fewest rushing touchdowns, team	0	Kansas City Chiefs
Fewest passing touchdowns, team	0	Kansas City Chiefs
Fewest punt returns, team	0	Tampa Bay Buccaneers
Fewest turnovers, team	0	Tampa Bay Buccaneers
Fewest punt return yards, both teams	0	Super Bowl LV
Fewest fumbles lost, both teams	0	Super Bowl LV

=== Individual statistics ===
Kansas City statistics
Chiefs passing
	C/ATT^{1}	Yds	TD	INT	Rating
Patrick Mahomes	26/49	270	0	2	52.3
Chiefs rushing
	Car^{2}	Yds	TD	Lg^{3}	Yds/Car
Clyde Edwards-Helaire	9	64	0	26	7.1
Patrick Mahomes	5	33	0	11	6.6
Darrel Williams	2	5	0	3	2.5
Tyreek Hill	1	5	0	5	5.0
Chiefs receiving
	Rec^{4}	Yds	TD	Lg^{3}	Target^{5}
Travis Kelce	10	133	0	33	15
Tyreek Hill	7	73	0	23	10
Clyde Edwards-Helaire	2	23	0	18	3
Darrel Williams	2	10	0	9	7
Mecole Hardman	2	4	0	4	6
Sammy Watkins	1	13	0	13	1
Demarcus Robinson	1	11	0	11	2
Byron Pringle	1	3	0	3	2

Tampa Bay statistics
Buccaneers passing
	C/ATT^{1}	Yds	TD	INT	Rating
Tom Brady	21/29	201	3	0	125.8
Buccaneers rushing
	Car^{2}	Yds	TD	Lg^{3}	Yds/Car
Leonard Fournette	16	89	1	27	5.6
Ronald Jones II	12	61	0	13	5.1
Tom Brady	4	–2	0	0	–0.5
Scotty Miller	1	–3	0	–3	–3
Buccaneers receiving
	Rec^{4}	Yds	TD	Lg^{3}	Target^{5}
Rob Gronkowski	6	67	2	25	7
Antonio Brown	5	22	1	16	6
Leonard Fournette	4	46	0	15	4
Cameron Brate	3	26	0	15	3
Chris Godwin	2	9	0	8	4
Mike Evans	1	31	0	31	1
Ronald Jones II	0	0	0	0	1
Joe Haeg	0	0	0	0	1
Tyler Johnson	0	0	0	0	1
Tanner Hudson	0	0	0	0	1

^{1}Completions/attempts
^{2}Carries
^{3}Long gain
^{4}Receptions
^{5}Times targeted

== Starting lineups ==
Both teams used a single set back formation as their base offense, with three wide receivers, one tight end and one running back. On defense, both teams used a variation of the nickel defense, as their base defense, with five defensive backs. Kansas City used a 4–2–5 variation with four down linemen and two linebackers, while Tampa Bay used a 2–4–5 with two down linemen and four linebackers. Kansas City's normal starter at left tackle, Pro Bowl selection Eric Fisher, was out with an achilles tendon injury he suffered in the AFC Championship Game. With his injury and others along the offensive line, the Chiefs were starting their fourth option on the depth chart at left tackle, third option at right guard, and third option at right tackle.

Starting lineups for Super Bowl LV
Kansas City	Position		Tampa Bay
Offense
Demarcus Robinson	WR		Mike Evans
Travis Kelce	TE		Rob Gronkowski
Mike Remmers	LT		Donovan Smith
Nick Allegretti	LG		Ali Marpet
Austin Reiter	C		Ryan Jensen
Stefen Wisniewski	RG		Aaron Stinnie
Andrew Wylie	RT		Tristan Wirfs
Tyreek Hill	WR		Scotty Miller
Byron Pringle	WR		Chris Godwin
Patrick Mahomes	QB		Tom Brady
Clyde Edwards-Helaire	RB		Leonard Fournette
Defense
Tanoh Kpassagnon	LDE	DL	Ndamukong Suh
Chris Jones	LDT	NT	Rakeem Nuñez-Roches
Derrick Nnadi	RDT	OLB	Jason Pierre-Paul
Frank Clark	RDE	ILB	Devin White
Anthony Hitchens	LB	ILB	Lavonte David
Damien Wilson	LB	OLB	Shaquil Barrett
Charvarius Ward	LCB	CB	Carlton Davis
Bashaud Breeland	RCB	CB	Jamel Dean
L'Jarius Sneed	CB		Sean Murphy-Bunting
Daniel Sorensen	FS	S	Jordan Whitehead
Tyrann Mathieu	SS	S	Antoine Winfield Jr.

== Officials ==
Super Bowl LV featured seven officials. Sarah Thomas was the first woman to officiate a Super Bowl and any championship event in the major North American professional sports leagues. This was the first Super Bowl to have an alternate official for every position on the field since Super Bowl I. It was also the first time the replay official had a backup. The numbers in parentheses below indicate their uniform numbers.

- Referee: Carl Cheffers (51)
- Umpire: Fred Bryan (11)
- Down judge: Sarah Thomas (53)
- Line judge: Rusty Baynes (59)
- Field judge: James Coleman (95)
- Side judge: Eugene Hall (103)
- Back judge: Dino Paganelli (105)
- Replay official: Mike Wimmer
- Replay assistant: Sean McKee
- Alternates:
  - Referee: Shawn Smith (14)
  - Umpire: Ramon George (128)
  - Down judge: Jerod Phillips (6)
  - Line judge: Mark Steinkerchner (84)
  - Field judge: Tom Hill (97)
  - Side judge: Jabir Walker (26)
  - Back judge: Brad Freeman (88)
  - Replay official: Mark Butterworth
