= Shawn Murphy =

Shawn Murphy may refer to:

- Shawn Murphy (politician) (born 1951), Canadian politician
- Shawn Murphy (American football) (born 1982), American football player
- Shawn Murphy (sound engineer) (born 1948), American sound engineer

== See also ==
- Shaun Murphy (disambiguation)
- Sean Murphy (disambiguation)
