= Sean Murphy-Bunting =

American football player (born 1997)

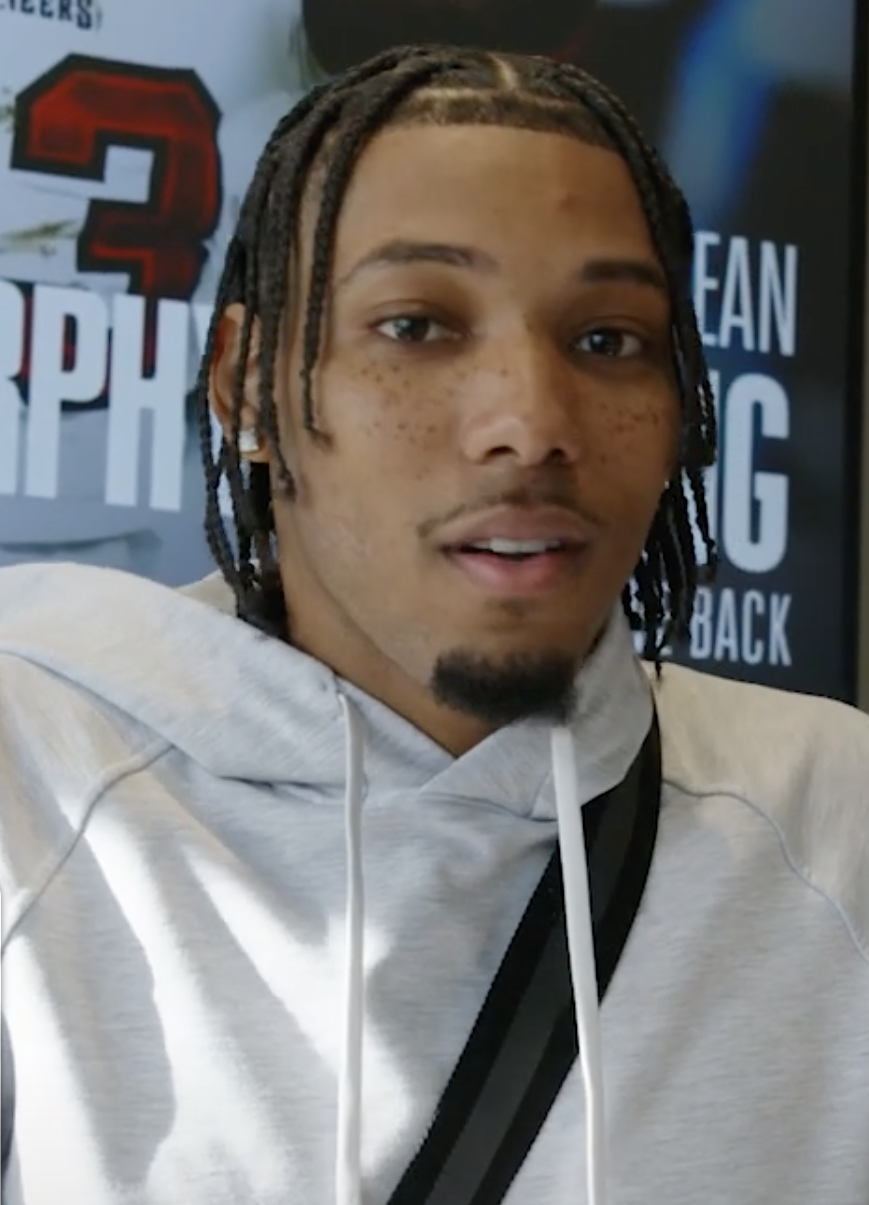
- Murphy-Bunting in 2023

No. 27 – Pittsburgh Steelers
- Position: Cornerback
- Roster status: Active

Personal information
- Born: June 19, 1997 (age 29); Macomb, Michigan, U.S.
- Listed height: 6 ft 0 in (1.83 m)
- Listed weight: 195 lb (88 kg)

Career information
- High school: Chippewa Valley (Clinton Township, Michigan)
- College: Central Michigan (2016–2018)
- NFL draft: 2019: 2nd round, 39th overall pick

Career history
- Tampa Bay Buccaneers (2019–2022); Tennessee Titans (2023); Arizona Cardinals (2024–2025); Tampa Bay Buccaneers (2026)*; Pittsburgh Steelers (2026–present)
- * Offseason or practice squad member only

Awards and highlights
- Super Bowl champion (LV); PFWA All-Rookie Team (2019); First-team All-MAC (2018)

Career NFL statistics as of 2025
- Total tackles: 297
- Sacks: 1
- Forced fumbles: 8
- Fumble recoveries: 2
- Pass deflections: 34
- Interceptions: 11
- Defensive touchdowns: 1
- Stats at Pro Football Reference

Sean Murphy-Bunting (formerly Bunting, born June 19, 1997) is an American professional football cornerback for the Pittsburgh Steelers of the National Football League (NFL). He played college football for the Central Michigan Chippewas.

== Early life ==
Murphy-Bunting attended and played high school football at Chippewa Valley High School.

== College career ==
Murphy-Bunting played three seasons for the Chippewas, starting his sophomore and junior seasons. As a sophomore, he recorded five interceptions, which finished second in the Mid-American Conference (MAC). As a junior, Murphy-Bunting recorded 37 tackles and two interceptions and was named first team All-MAC0. He decided to forgo his final year of eligibility to enter the 2019 NFL Draft.

== Professional career ==
=== Pre-draft ===
Pro Football Focus and Scout Inc. ranked Murphy-Bunting the 10th best cornerback prospect in the draft. Sports Illustrated had him ranked as the 17th best cornerback in the draft. The majority of NFL draft analysts projected Murphy-Bunting to be a second round pick.

Pre-draft measurables
Height	Weight	Arm length	Hand span	Wingspan	40-yard dash	10-yard split	20-yard split	20-yard shuttle	Three-cone drill	Vertical jump	Broad jump	Bench press
6 ft 0 3/8 in (1.84 m)	195 lb (88 kg)	31 3/4 in (0.81 m)	9 5/8 in (0.24 m)	6 ft 4 3/4 in (1.95 m)	4.42 s	1.51 s	2.59 s	4.20 s	6.89 s	41.5 in (1.05 m)	10 ft 6 in (3.20 m)	14 reps
All values from NFL Combine/Pro Day

=== Tampa Bay Buccaneers (first stint) ===
The Tampa Bay Buccaneers selected Murphy-Bunting in the second round (39th overall) of the 2019 NFL draft. He was the fourth cornerback drafted in 2019 and was the first of two cornerbacks drafted by Tampa Bay, with the other being third round pick (94th overall) Jamel Dean.

"With Bunting, what we liked about him: first of all, a superb kid, locker room guy and teammate. We compared our meetings with him to those with Devin [White] in terms of just his infectious personality and I think he's got a lot of leadership qualities in him. He can play outside, he can play inside, he's a tough guy. He's very smart. He'll get his opportunities at all of those places."

— Jason Licht (Buccaneers' General Manager)

"Press ability, man coverage and he's a ball-hawk. Obviously, he can only get better. We'll get him in and get him in the program and mix him in with the other guys and try to get him better."

— Todd Bowles (Buccaneers' defensive coordinator)

==== 2019 ====
On May 9, 2019, the Tampa Bay Buccaneers signed Murphy-Bunting to a four-year, $7.37 million contract that included $4.21 million guaranteed upon signing and a signing bonus of $3.38 million.

Throughout training camp, he competed for a role at starting cornerback against Vernon Hargreaves, Ryan Smith, and Jamel Dean. Head coach Bruce Arians named Murphy-Bunting a backup to begin the season and listed him as the fifth cornerback on the depth chart, behind starters Carlton Davis and Vernon Hargreaves III and second-team cornerbacks Jamel Dean and M. J. Stewart.

On September 8, 2019, he made his professional regular season debut, but appeared mainly on special teams during a 31–17 loss to the San Francisco 49ers. On October 6, 2019, Murphy-Bunting had four combined tackles (three solo) and made his first career interception off a throw by Teddy Bridgewater that was intended for running back Alvin Kamara as the Buccaneers lost 31–24 at the New Orleans Saints. The following week, he earned his first career start as a nickelback during a 37–26 loss to the Carolina Panthers in Week 6. In Weeks 9 and 10, Murphy-Bunting started at outside cornerback in place of Carlton Davis who injured his hip during pregame warmups prior to kickoff. He performed well enough to supplant Vernon Hargreaves at starting cornerback when Davis returned in Week 11 and Hargreaves would go on to be released on November 12, 2019. In Week 13, Murphy-Bunting recorded a season-high two pass deflections and made a critical fourth quarter interception by rookie Gardner Minshew in the Buccaneers' end zone to end a 28–11 win at the Jacksonville Jaguars. On December 15, 2019, he had a team-leading and season-high eight solo tackles, made one pass deflection, and intercepted a pass by rookie David Blough to return it 70-yards for his first career touchdown during a 38–17 win at the Detroit Lions. The following week, Murphy-Bunting had four solo tackles, one pass deflection, and had his first career sack on Deshaun Watson, causing a fumble during a 23–20 loss to the Houston Texans in Week 16. He finished his rookie season in 2019 with a total 44 combined tackles (37 solo), eight pass deflections, three interceptions, one touchdown, a sack, and one forced fumble while appearing in all 16 games with ten starts. He was named to the PFWA All-Rookie Team.

==== 2020 ====
He entered training camp slated as starting cornerback. Defensive coordinator Todd Bowles retained Murphy-Bunting and Carlton Davis as the starting cornerbacks to start the season. Murphy-Bunting elected to change his jersey number from No. 26 to No. 23. He cited No. 23 to be a nod to NBA great Michael Jordan as well as being a nod to his family that consists of two younger brothers and three older brothers. Murphy-Bunting and Carlton Davis returned as the starting cornerback tandem to kick off the regular season.

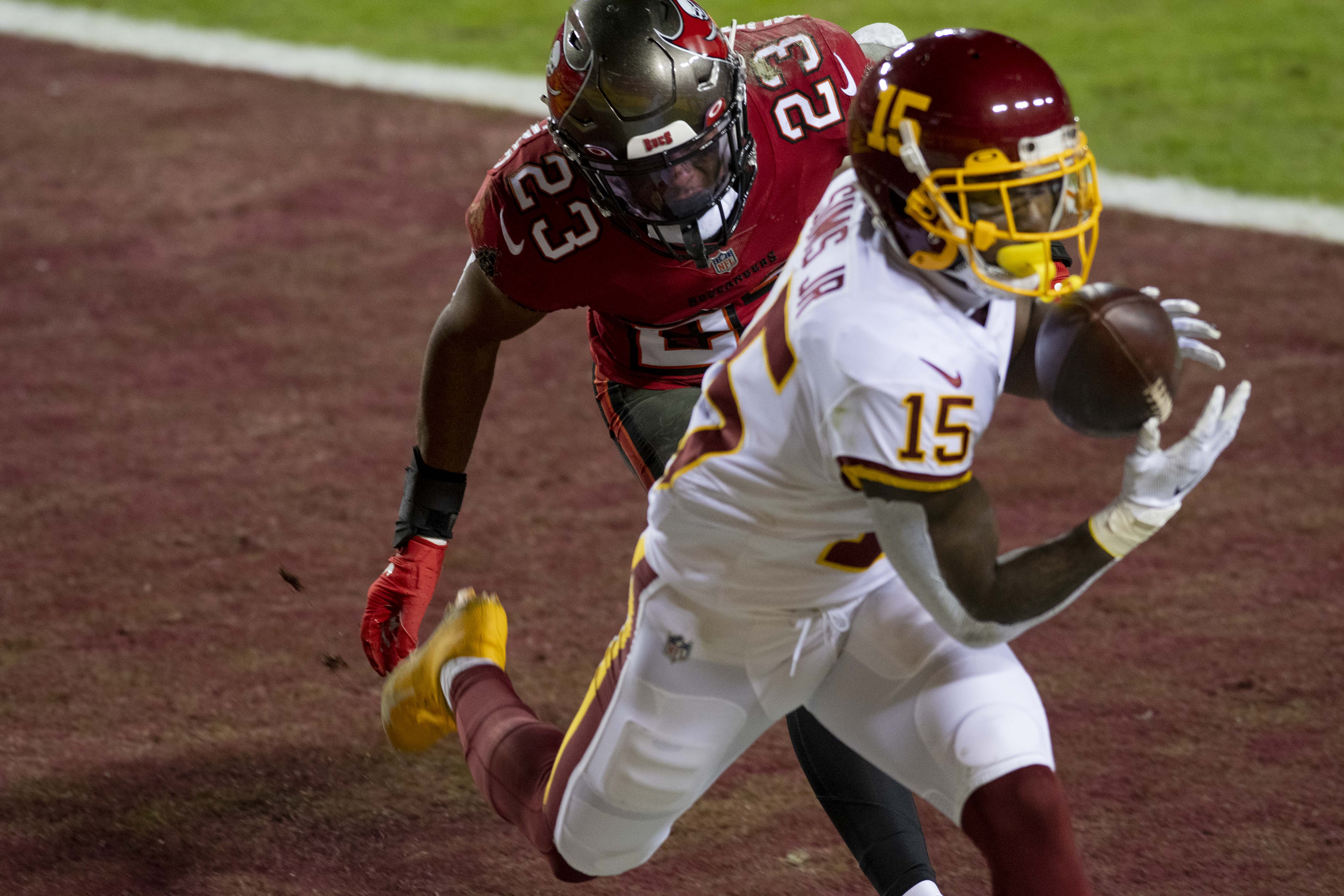
Murphy-Bunting (#23) playing in Wild Card Playoff game against the Washington Football Team.

On November 20, 2020, Murphy–Bunting recorded six combined tackles (three solo), a pass deflection, and had his first interception of the season off of a pass by Daniel Jones intended for wide receiver Golden Tate in the fourth quarter of a 25–23 win at the New York Giants on Monday Night Football. In Week 11, he collected a season-high ten combined tackles (five solo) as the Buccaneers lost, 27-24, to the Los Angeles Chargers. He finished the 2020 NFL season with 70 combined tackles (51 solo), one interception, two passes defended, one forced fumble, and one fumble recovery in 16 games and 13 starts.

==== 2020 NFL playoffs ====
The Tampa Bay Buccaneers finished the 2020 NFL season second in the NFC South with an 11–5 record and earned a Wildcard berth. On January 9, 2021, Murphy-Bunting started in his first career playoff appearance and had two combined tackles (one solo) and intercepted a pass by Taylor Heinicke intended for wide receiver Terry McLaurin as the Buccaneers defeated the Washington Football Team, 31–23, in the Wild Card Round. On January 17, 2021, he made five solo tackles, two pass deflections, and picked off a pass attempt by Drew Brees while covering Michael Thomas and returned it 37-yards during a 30–20 win at the New Orleans Saints in the NFC Divisional Round. On January 24, 2021, Murphy-Bunting recorded six solo tackles, a pass deflection, and intercepted a pass by Aaron Rodgers to wide receiver Allen Lazard in a 31–26 win over the Green Bay Packers in the NFC Championship Game.

===== Super Bowl LV =====
On February 7, 2021, Murphy-Bunting started in Super Bowl LV and recorded six combined tackles (three solo) and a pass deflection as the Tampa Bay Buccaneers defeated the Kansas City Chiefs, 31–9, to earn his first Super Bowl Championship. His playoff performance with three interceptions made Murphy-Bunting the first player to have an interception in each of his first three career playoff games consecutively since Hall of Fame safety Ed Reed.

==== 2021 ====
Defensive coordinator Todd Bowles retained Murphy-Bunting and Carlton Davis as the starting cornerback duo with Jamel Dean returned at nickelback. On September 9, 2021, Murphy-Bunting had two combined tackles (one solo) before exiting in the first quarter with an injury during a 31–29 win against the Dallas Cowboys in their home-opener. On September 13, 2021, the Buccaneers placed Murphy-Bunting on injured reserve due to a dislocated elbow he suffered in Week 1. On November 22, 2021, the Tampa Bay Buccaneers activated Murphy-Bunting from injured reserve after he missed eight games (Weeks 2–10). In Week 11, he racked up a season-high seven solo tackles and deflected one pass in a 30–10 defeat over the New York Giants. On December 12, 2021, he collected a season-high eight combined tackles (seven solo) as they defeated the Buffalo Bills 33–27. He finished the season with 43 combined tackles (30 solo), three pass deflections, and a forced fumble in nine games and eight starts.

==== 2022 ====
On March 30, 2022, the Tampa Bay Buccaneers announced that head coach Bruce Arians would step down as head coach and transition into an advisory role. Subsequently, defensive coordinator Todd Bowles was promoted to head coach. Throughout training camp, Murphy-Bunting competed against Jamel Dean to earn a role as a starting cornerback. After a closely contested battle, Murphy-Bunting lost his role and was demoted to backup behind starters Jamel Dean and Carlton Davis.

In week 4, Murphy-Bunting had three combined tackles (one solo), a pass deflection, and also intercepted a pass thrown by Patrick Mahomes to JuJu Smith-Schuster and returned it for 33-yards in a 31–41 loss to the Kansas City Chiefs. The following week, he exited a 21–15 victory over the Atlanta Falcons after he suffered an injury to his quadriceps and missed two games (Weeks 6–7). He returned in Week 9 and collected a season-high six combined tackles (four solo) as the Buccaneers defeated the Los Angeles Rams, 16–13. After reaggravating his injury to his quadriceps, he was sidelined for two games (Weeks 13–14). He finished his last season with the Tampa Bay Buccaneers with 31 total tackles (19 solo), two interceptions, seven passes defensed, and one forced fumble in 13 games and five starts.

=== Tennessee Titans ===
==== 2023 ====
On March 20, 2023, the Tennessee Titans signed Murphy-Bunting to a one–year, $3.50 million contract that was fully guaranteed upon signing and included an initial signing bonus of $2.42 million. Throughout training camp, Murphy-Bunting competed for a role at starting cornerback against Roger McCreary. Head coach Mike Vrabel named Murphy-Bunting and Kristian Fulton the starting cornerbacks to begin the season. He became the first player in Titans history to wear the #0 after it was allowed beginning in the 2023 season.

On September 10, 2023, Murphy-Bunting started in the Titans' season-opener and recorded six combined tackles (four solo) and forced a fumble during a 16–15 loss at the New Orleans Saints. The following week, he made three combined tackles (one solo) and set a career-high with three pass deflections as the Titans defeated the Los Angeles Chargers, 26–24. He was sidelined for two games (Weeks 10–11) after sustaining an injury to his thumb. In Week 14, Murphy-Bunting racked up a season-high seven solo tackles and had a pass deflection during a 19–16 loss against the Houston Texans. He was inactive for the Titans' Week 16 loss to the Seattle Seahawks after injuring his shoulder. On January 7, 2024, he collected a season-high eight combined tackles (seven solo) and intercepted a pass thrown by Trevor Lawrence to Zay Jones during a 28–20 victory against the Jacksonville Jaguars. In his lone season with the Tennessee Titans, Murphy-Bunting recorded a total of 57 combined tackles (42 solo), eight pass deflections, and two interceptions in 14 games and 14 starts.

=== Arizona Cardinals ===
==== 2024 ====
On March 14, 2024, the Arizona Cardinals signed Murphy-Bunting to a three-year, $25.50 million contract that includes $17.39 million guaranteed with $14.19 million guaranteed upon signing and also included an initial signing bonus of $6.00 million.

Upon signing with Arizona, Murphy-Bunting became the apparent No. 1 cornerback on the depth chart as the only experienced veteran among a young core group of players, that included second year players Garrett Williams, Kei'Trel Clark, Starling Thomas V, and Divaad Wilson as well as rookies Max Melton, Elijah Jones, and Jaden Davis. Head coach Jonathan Gannon listed Murphy-Bunting and Garrett Willams as the starting cornerbacks to begin the season.

In Week 3, he collected a season-high seven combined tackles (three solo) as the Cardinals lost, 20–13, to the Detroit Lions. He was inactive for two games (Weeks 8–9) after injuring his neck. On December 14, 2024, Murphy-Bunting made two combined tackles (one solo), a pass deflection, and made his first interception with the Cardinals on a pass thrown by Drake Maye intended for wide receiver Kayshon Boutte as they defeated the New England Patriots, 30–17. He finished with 52 combined tackles (30 solo), five pass deflections, and a career-high three interceptions in 15 games and 15 starts.

==== 2025 ====
On May 22, 2025, the Cardinals placed Murphy-Bunting on the reserve/non-football injury list due to a torn ACL and MCL damage, ending his 2025 season.

On August 30, 2026, Murphy-Bunting was waived by the Cardinals as a part of final roster cuts.

=== Tampa Bay Buccaneers (second stint) ===
On September 2, 2026, Murphy-Bunting was signed to the Tampa Bay Buccaneers' practice squad.

=== Pittsburgh Steelers ===
On October 5, 2026, Murphy-Bunting was signed by the Pittsburgh Steelers off the Buccaneers practice squad.

== NFL career statistics ==
Legend
	Won the Super Bowl
**Bold**	Career high

=== Regular season ===
Year	Team	Games		Tackles					Interceptions						Fumbles			
Year	Team	GP	GS	Comb	Solo	Ast	Sack	Sfty	PD	Int	Yds	Avg	Lng	TD	FF	FR	Yds	TD
2019	TB	**16**	10	44	37	7	**1.0**	0	**8**	**3**	**88**	**29.3**	**70**	**1**	1	0	0	0
2020	TB	**16**	13	**70**	**53**	**17**	0.0	0	3	1	0	0.0	0	0	1	**1**	3	0
2021	TB	9	8	43	30	13	0.0	0	3	0	0	0.0	0	0	1	0	0	0
2022	TB	12	5	31	19	12	0.0	0	7	2	33	16.5	33	0	1	0	0	0
2023	TEN	14	14	57	42	15	0.0	0	**8**	2	12	6.0	10	0	**2**	**1**	**5**	0
2024	ARI	15	**15**	52	30	22	0.0	0	5	**3**	2	1.5	2	0	**2**	0	0	0
Total		82	65	297	211	86	1.0	0	34	11	135	12.3	70	1	8	2	8	0

=== Postseason ===
Year	Team	Games		Tackles					Interceptions						Fumbles			
Year	Team	GP	GS	Comb	Solo	Ast	Sack	Sfty	PD	Int	Yds	Avg	Lng	TD	FF	FR	Yds	TD
2020	TB	**4**	**4**	**19**	**15**	**4**	0.0	0	**5**	**3**	**36**	**12.0**	**36**	0	0	0	0	0
2021	TB	1	0	4	2	2	0.0	0	0	0	0	0.0	0	0	0	**1**	**10**	0
2022	TB	1	1	6	4	2	0.0	0	0	0	0	0.0	0	0	0	0	0	0
Total		6	5	29	21	8	0.0	0	5	3	36	12.0	36	0	0	1	10	0
