= Sean Murphy (journalist) =

Australian journalist

Sean Murphy is an Australian journalist.

He was born in Western Australia in 1961. He was brought up on Rottnest Island where his parents owned a pub. He began working in journalism in 1979, when he worked for the Sunday Independent in Perth. He subsequently moved to the Australian Broadcasting Corporation. He is currently a producer for ABC Television's Landline program since 2002.

He is married, lives in Sydney and has two children.
