= Seán Murphy (hurler) =

Irish hurler (born 1947)

Personal information
- Native name: Seán Ó Murchú (Irish)
- Born: 1947 (age 78–79) Carnmore, County Galway
- Height: 5 ft 10 in (178 cm)

Sport
- Position: Midfield
Club
- Years: Club
- 1960s-1980s: Carnmore
Club titles
- Galway titles: 0
Inter-county
- Years: County
- 1960s-1970s: Galway
Inter-county titles
- All-Irelands: 0
- All Stars: 0
	Football	Hurling
League titles		1

Seán Murphy (born 1947 in Carnmore, County Galway) is an Irish former sportsperson. He played hurling with his local club Carnmore and was a member of the Galway senior inter-county team in the 1960s and 1970s.
