= M. J. Stewart =

American football player (born 1995)

Marvin Stewart Jr.
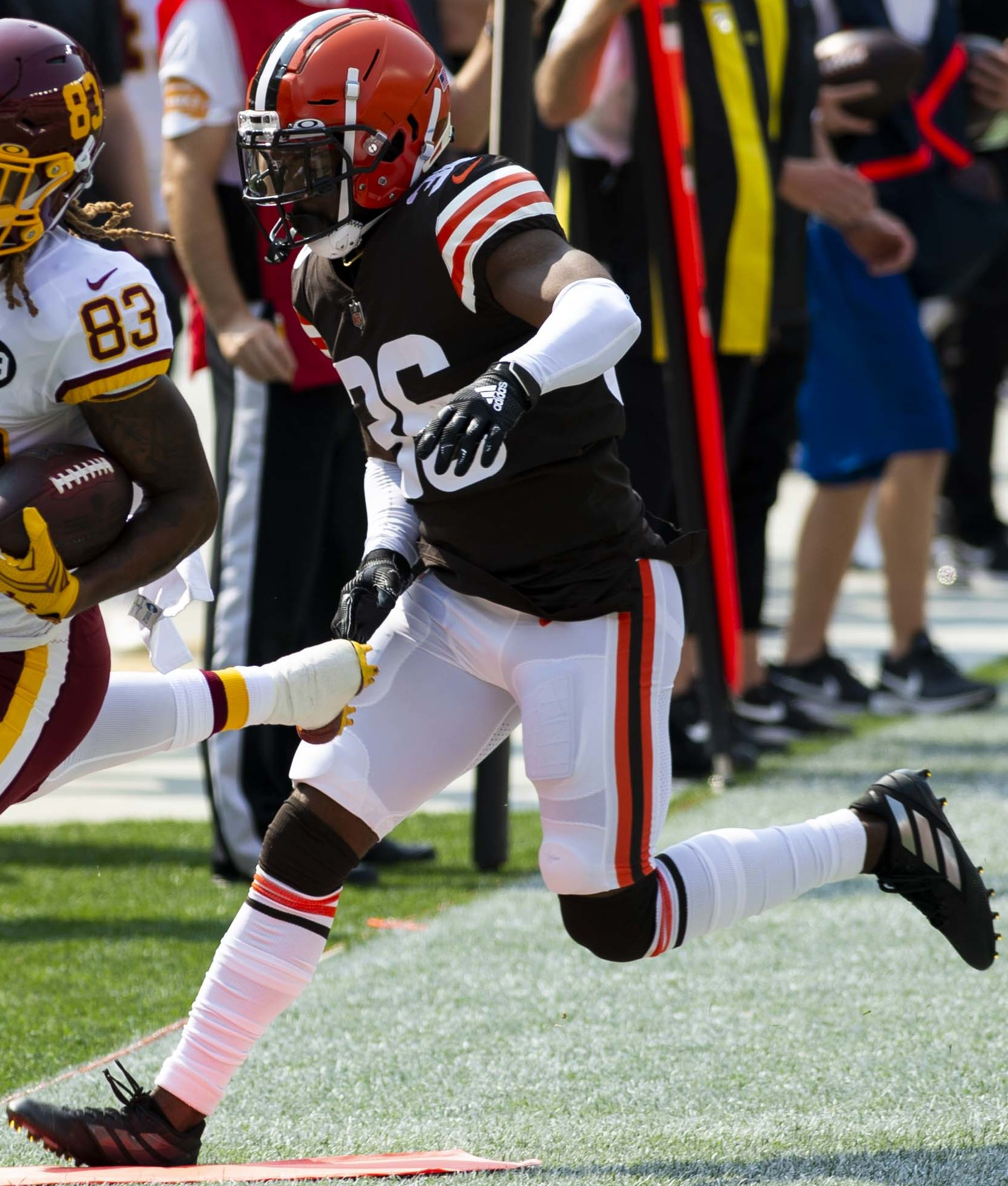
- Stewart with the Cleveland Browns in 2020

No. 29 – Houston Texans
- Position: Safety
- Roster status: Active

Personal information
- Born: September 16, 1995 (age 31); Arlington, Virginia, U.S.
- Listed height: 5 ft 11 in (1.80 m)
- Listed weight: 205 lb (93 kg)

Career information
- High school: Yorktown (Arlington)
- College: North Carolina (2014–2017)
- NFL draft: 2018: 2nd round, 53rd overall pick

Career history
- Tampa Bay Buccaneers (2018–2019); Cleveland Browns (2020–2021); Houston Texans (2022–present)

Awards and highlights
- Second team All-ACC (2015)

Career NFL statistics as of 2025
- Total tackles: 237
- Sacks: 1
- Pass deflections: 15
- Interceptions: 2
- Forced fumbles: 4
- Fumble recoveries: 4
- Stats at Pro Football Reference

Marvin Stewart Jr. (born September 16, 1995) is an American professional football safety for the Houston Texans of the National Football League (NFL). He played college football for the North Carolina Tar Heels. He was selected by the Tampa Bay Buccaneers in the second round of the 2018 NFL draft, and has also been a member of the Cleveland Browns.

== College career ==
During his sophomore season, Stewart was suspended from the team due to a violation of team rules, along with teammate Mike Hughes. He was later charged with misdemeanor assault and battery, but charges were later dropped. Stewart was reinstated less than a week later. There was speculation that Stewart would forgo his senior year and declare for the 2017 NFL draft, but he later announced that he would return for the 2017 season. Following his senior season, Stewart was named to the First-team All-Atlantic Coast Conference by Pro Football Focus.

== Professional career ==
External videos
- M.J. Stewart's NFL Combine Workout
- NFL Draft Profile: M.J. Stewart

Pre-draft measurables
Height	Weight	Arm length	Hand span	Wingspan	40-yard dash	10-yard split	20-yard split	20-yard shuttle	Three-cone drill	Vertical jump	Broad jump	Bench press
5 ft 10 7/8 in (1.80 m)	200 lb (91 kg)	31 1/4 in (0.79 m)	9 1/4 in (0.23 m)	6 ft 3 3/8 in (1.91 m)	4.54 s	1.57 s	2.66 s	4.28 s	6.90 s	35.0 in (0.89 m)	9 ft 10 in (3.00 m)	18 reps
All values from NFL Combine

=== Tampa Bay Buccaneers ===
The Tampa Bay Buccaneers selected Stewart in the second round (53rd overall) of the 2018 NFL draft. Stewart was the fifth cornerback drafted in 2018.

External videos
- Buccaneers draft M.J. Stewart 53rd overall

On May 10, 2018, the Tampa Bay Buccaneers signed Stewart to a four–year, $5.08 million contract that includes $2.48 million guaranteed and a signing bonus of $1.77 million.

Throughout training camp, Stewart competed to be a starting cornerback against Ryan Smith, Vernon Hargreaves, and Carlton Davis. Head coach Dirk Koetter named Stewart the fifth cornerback on the depth chart to start the regular season, behind Brent Grimes, Hargreaves, Davis, and Smith.

He made his professional regular season debut in the Buccaneers' season-opener at the New Orleans Saints and recorded four solo tackles during their 48–40 victory; in this game, Hargreaves sustained a shoulder injury and was placed on injured reserve. The following week, Stewart earned his first career start in place of Hargreaves. Stewart finished the Buccaneers' 27–21 win against the Philadelphia Eagles with five combined tackles. In Week 3, Stewart collected a season-high nine solo tackles and broke up a pass attempt during a 30–27 loss against the Pittsburgh Steelers. He was inactive for five games (Weeks 9–13) after injuring his foot. Stewart lost his role as a starting cornerback to Ryan Smith during his absence and remained a backup for the last four games of the season. Stewart finished his rookie season with 33 combined tackles (31 solo) and 3 pass deflections in 11 games with 5 starts.

On August 6, 2020, Stewart was waived by the Buccaneers.

=== Cleveland Browns ===
Stewart was claimed off waivers by the Cleveland Browns on August 8, 2020.

In Week 4 against the Dallas Cowboys, Stewart recorded his first career sack on quarterback Dak Prescott during the 49–38 win. In Week 13 against the Tennessee Titans, Stewart recorded his first career interception off a pass thrown by quarterback Ryan Tannehill during the 41–35 win.

In the wild card round of the playoffs against the Steelers, Stewart led the team with 10 tackles and intercepted a pass thrown by quarterback Ben Roethlisberger in the 48–37 win.

On October 12, 2021, Stewart was placed on injured reserve. He was activated on November 13.

=== Houston Texans ===
On March 24, 2022, Stewart signed with the Houston Texans.

On March 15, 2023, Stewart signed a two-year contract extension with the Texans. He was placed on injured reserve on November 7.

On March 11, 2025, Stewart re-signed with the Texans for his fourth season with the team. In nine appearances (four starts) for the Texans, he recorded two pass deflections, one forced fumble, and 25 combined tackles. On November 9, it was announced that Stewart would require season-ending surgery to repair a torn quadriceps suffered in Week 10 against the Jacksonville Jaguars.

On March 10, 2026, Stewart signed a one-year contract extension with the Texans.
