= Scouts Inc. =

Sports scouting affiliate of ESPN

- Available in: English
- Creator: ESPN
- Website: https://www.espn.com/
- Commercial: Yes
- Registration: Available, but not required
- Current status: Active

Scouts Inc. is a partner of ESPN Inc., that specializes in scouting and evaluating current and future players and teams in professional, college and high school sports. The content is provided on the ESPN television networks, ESPN Radio and ESPN internet sites.

== Personalities ==
- Mel Kiper Jr. - NFL and College football
- Todd McShay - NFL and College football
- Dean Dalton - NFL
- Gary Horton - NFL
- Doug Kretz - NFL
- Ken Moll - NFL
- Matt Williamson - NFL
- David Thorpe - NBA and College basketball
- Tom Luginbill - National high school recruiting and college football

== See also ==
- ESPN.com
- ESPN
