= 2016 Tampa Bay Buccaneers season =

NFL team season

- Owner: The Glazer family
- General manager: Jason Licht
- Head coach: Dirk Koetter
- Home stadium: Raymond James Stadium

Results
- Record: 9–7
- Division place: 2nd NFC South
- Playoffs: Did not qualify
- All-Pros: 3: WR Mike Evans (2nd team); DT Gerald McCoy (2nd team); OLB Lavonte David (2nd team)
- Pro Bowlers: 2: WR Mike Evans; DT Gerald McCoy

Uniform
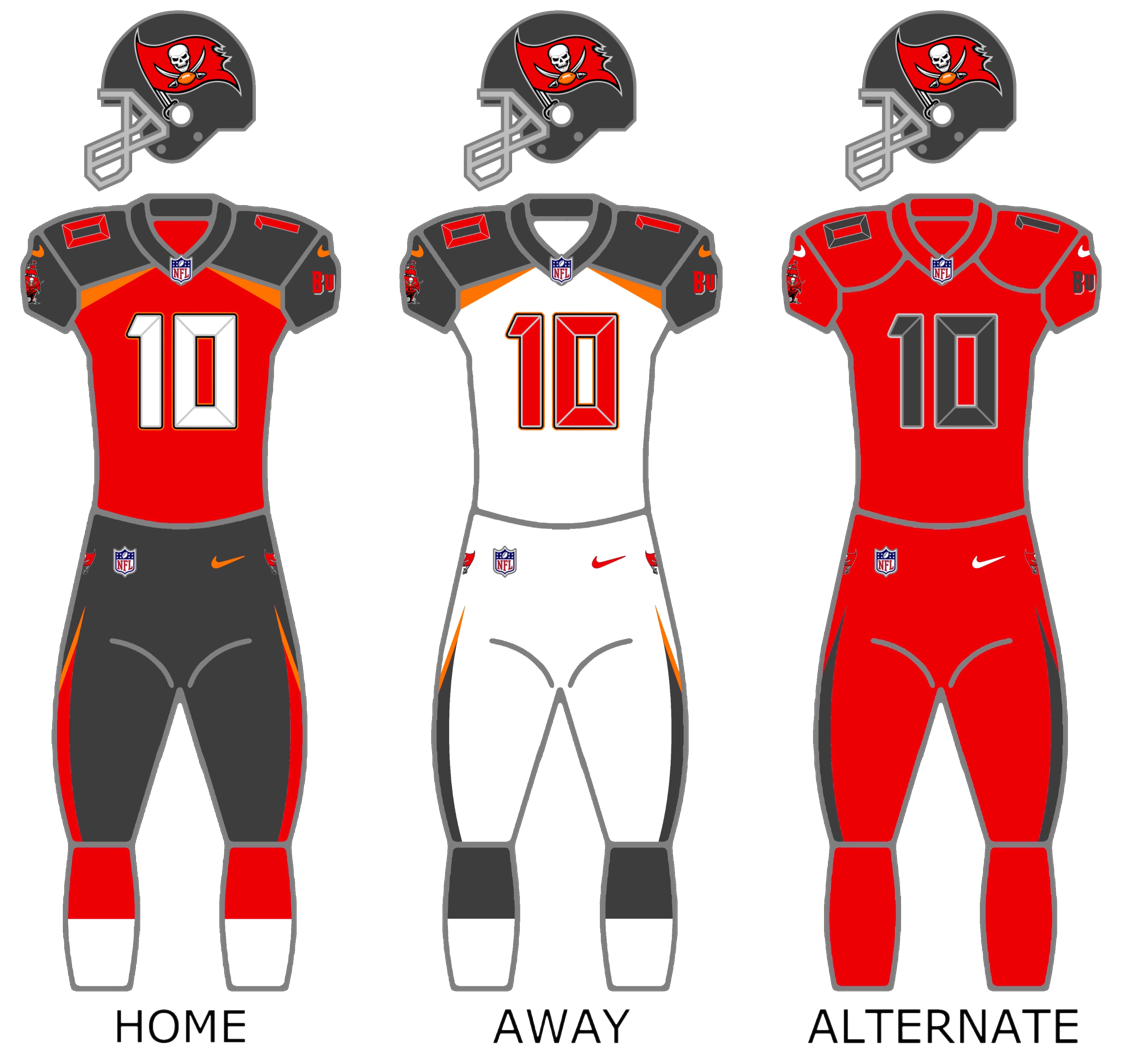

The 2016 season was the Tampa Bay Buccaneers' 41st in the National Football League (NFL) and their first under head coach Dirk Koetter. In week 13, the club won their seventh game, eclipsing their win total from 2015.

After winning on opening day, Tampa Bay sputtered through the rest of September. Starting running back Doug Martin was sidelined for eight weeks with a hamstring injury, necessitating backup running backs taking his place in the lineup. After receiving adequate performances from Charles Sims and Antone Smith, both subsequently ended up on injured reserve, along with wide receivers Vincent Jackson and Cecil Shorts. A victory on Monday night against division rival Carolina saw Tampa Bay begin a streak in which they won seven out of their next nine games. Between weeks 10 and 14, the Buccaneers achieved their first five-game winning streak since their first Super Bowl championship season.

Losses to the Dallas Cowboys and the New Orleans Saints late in the season hampered the Buccaneers' playoff hopes; heading into week 17, the team was still mathematically alive for a wild card berth, but despite defeating the Carolina Panthers, the team missed the playoffs for the ninth consecutive season, tied for the fourth-longest active streak in the NFL with the Jacksonville Jaguars. The Buccaneers finished tied with the Detroit Lions for the last NFC playoff spot, but lost the tiebreaker because they had a worse record against common opponents than the Lions did. Nevertheless, the Buccaneers achieved their first winning season since the 2010 campaign, when they also narrowly missed the playoffs.

The Bucs would not have another winning season until 2020. Coincidentally, it was also the most recent season that they would finish 2nd until then and again in 2025.

== Draft ==
2016 Tampa Bay Buccaneers draft
Round	Selection	Player	Position	College
1	11	Vernon Hargreaves III	CB	Florida
2	39	Noah Spence	DE	Eastern Kentucky University
2	59	Roberto Aguayo	K	Florida State
4	108	Ryan Smith	CB	North Carolina Central
5	148	Caleb Benenoch	OT	UCLA
6	183	Devante Bond	OLB	Oklahoma
6	197	Dan Vitale	TE	Northwestern

Notes

- On April 3, 2015, the Buccaneers traded safety Dashon Goldson to the Washington Redskins, along with a seventh round pick (#232), for a sixth round pick (#197) in the 2016 NFL draft.

== Staff ==
2016 Tampa Bay Buccaneers staff
Front office: Owner/president – Estate of Malcolm Glazer; Co–Chairman – Bryan Glazer; Co–Chairman – Edward Glazer; Co–Chairman – Joel Glazer; General manager – Jason Licht; Director of player personnel – John Spytek; Director of football operations – Shelton Quarles; Director of college scouting – Mike Biehl; Pro scouting coordinator – Rob McCartney; Director of football administration – Mike Greenberg; Head coaches: Head coach – Dirk Koetter; Assistant to head coach – Zack Grossi; Offensive coaches: Offensive coordinator/wide receivers – Todd Monken; Quarterbacks – Mike Bajakian; Running backs – Tim Spencer; Assistant wide receivers/game management – Andrew Weidinger; Tight ends – Jon Embree; Offensive line/run game coordinator – George Warhop; Assistant offensive line – Butch Barry; Offensive quality control – Ben Steele	Defensive coaches: Defensive coordinator – Mike Smith; Defensive line – Jay Hayes; Assistant defensive line – Paul Spicer; Linebackers – Mark Duffner; Secondary – Jon Hoke; Defensive backs – Brett Maxie; Defensive quality control – Dave Borgonzi; Special teams coaches: Special teams coordinator – Nate Kaczor; Assistant special teams – Carlos Polk; Strength and conditioning: Head strength and conditioning – Dave Kennedy; Assistant strength and conditioning – Joe Vaughn; Assistant strength and conditioning – Chad Wade

== Final roster ==
2016 Tampa Bay Buccaneers roster
Quarterbacks (QB): 8 Mike Glennon; 4 Ryan Griffin; 3 Jameis Winston; Running backs (RB): 43 Peyton Barber; 45 Alan Cross FB; 44 Russell Hansbrough; 46 Austin Johnson FB; 32 Jacquizz Rodgers; Wide receivers (WR): 13 Mike Evans; 15 Josh Huff; 11 Adam Humphries; 16 Freddie Martino; 18 Bernard Reedy; 89 Russell Shepard; Tight ends (TE): 82 Brandon Myers; 88 Luke Stocker	Offensive linemen (OL): 77 Caleb Benenoch G; 78 Gosder Cherilus T; 69 Demar Dotson T; 68 Joe Hawley C; 74 Ali Marpet G; 64 Kevin Pamphile G; 76 Donovan Smith T; 62 Evan Smith C; 66 Leonard Wester T; Defensive linemen (DL): 91 Robert Ayers DE; 92 William Gholston DE; 67 John Hughes DT; 75 DaVonte Lambert DE; 93 Gerald McCoy DT; 98 Clinton McDonald DT; 96 Ryan Russell DE; 70 Sealver Siliga DT; 97 Akeem Spence DT; 57 Noah Spence DE; 71 Channing Ward DT	Linebackers (LB): 58 Kwon Alexander MLB; 54 Lavonte David OLB; 52 Adarius Glanton MLB; 52 Cameron Lynch OLB; 51 Daryl Smith OLB; Defensive backs (DB): 23 Chris Conte SS; 35 Javien Elliott CB; 24 Brent Grimes CB; 28 Vernon Hargreaves CB; 30 Bradley McDougald FS; 26 Josh Robinson CB; 29 Ryan Smith FS; 37 Keith Tandy SS; 21 Alterraun Verner CB; Special teams (ST): 19 Roberto Aguayo K; 9 Bryan Anger P; 48 Andrew DePaola LS	Practice squad: 61 Josh Allen C; 90 Deonte Gibson DE; 14 Kendrick Ings WR; 39 Isaiah Johnson S; 60 Kyler Kerbyson T; 65 Michael Liedtke G; 27 Cody Riggs CB; 25 Blake Sims RB; 81 Tevin Westbrook TE; 80 Myles White WR; Reserve: 38 Jude Adjei-Barimah CB (IR); 59 Devante Bond OLB (IR); 84 Cameron Brate TE (IR); 17 Donteea Dye WR (IR); 72 Ben Gottschalk G (IR); 83 Vincent Jackson WR (IR); 94 George Johnson DE (IR); 95 Howard Jones DE (IR); 22 Doug Martin RB (Susp.); 10 Cecil Shorts WR (IR); 34 Charles Sims RB (IR); 36 Antone Smith RB (IR); 56 Jacquies Smith DE (IR); 73 J. R. Sweezy G (PUP); Rookies in italics 53 active, 14 reserve, 10 practice squad

== Schedule ==
=== Preseason ===
This was the first preseason since 1999 that the Buccaneers did not play the Miami Dolphins.

Week	Date	Opponent	Result	Record	Venue	Recap
1	August 11	at Philadelphia Eagles	**L** 9–17	0–1	Lincoln Financial Field	Recap
2	August 20	at Jacksonville Jaguars	**W** 27–21	1–1	EverBank Field	Recap
3	August 26	Cleveland Browns	**W** 30–13	2–1	Raymond James Stadium	Recap
4	August 31 (Note: The Week 4 preseason game vs. the Washington Redskins at Raymond James Stadium, originally scheduled for September 1, was moved forward to Wednesday, August 31, in an effort to avoid anticipated severe weather from Tropical Depression Nine.)	Washington Redskins	**L** 13–20	2–2	Raymond James Stadium	Recap

=== Regular season ===
Week	Date	Opponent	Result	Record	Venue	Recap
1	September 11	at **Atlanta Falcons**	**W** 31–24	1–0	Georgia Dome	Recap
2	September 18	at Arizona Cardinals	**L** 7–40	1–1	University of Phoenix Stadium	Recap
3	September 25	Los Angeles Rams	**L** 32–37	1–2	Raymond James Stadium	Recap
4	October 2	Denver Broncos	**L** 7–27	1–3	Raymond James Stadium	Recap
5	October 10	at **Carolina Panthers**	**W** 17–14	2–3	Bank of America Stadium	Recap
6	Bye					
7	October 23	at San Francisco 49ers	**W** 34–17	3–3	Levi's Stadium	Recap
8	October 30	Oakland Raiders	**L** 24–30 (OT)	3–4	Raymond James Stadium	Recap
9	November 3	**Atlanta Falcons**	**L** 28–43	3–5	Raymond James Stadium	Recap
10	November 13	Chicago Bears	**W** 36–10	4–5	Raymond James Stadium	Recap
11	November 20	at Kansas City Chiefs	**W** 19–17	5–5	Arrowhead Stadium	Recap
12	November 27	Seattle Seahawks	**W** 14–5	6–5	Raymond James Stadium	Recap
13	December 4	at San Diego Chargers	**W** 28–21	7–5	Qualcomm Stadium	Recap
14	December 11	**New Orleans Saints**	**W** 16–11	8–5	Raymond James Stadium	Recap
15	December 18	at Dallas Cowboys	**L** 20–26	8–6	AT&T Stadium	Recap
16	December 24	at **New Orleans Saints**	**L** 24–31	8–7	Mercedes-Benz Superdome	Recap
17	January 1	**Carolina Panthers**	**W** 17–16	9–7	Raymond James Stadium	Recap
Note: Intra-division opponents are in **bold** text.

=== Game summaries ===
==== Week 1: at Atlanta Falcons ====
Week One: Tampa Bay Buccaneers at Atlanta Falcons – Game summary

Quarter	1	2	3	4	Total
**Buccaneers**	3	14	14	0	**31**
Falcons	10	3	8	3	**24**

at Georgia Dome, Atlanta, Georgia

- Date: September 11
- Game time: 1:00 p.m. EDT
- Game weather: Played indoors (dome stadium)
- Game attendance: 69,382
- Referee: Jeff Triplette
- TV announcers (Fox): Sam Rosen, David Diehl and Holly Sonders
- Recap, Gamebook

Game information

**First quarter**

- TB – Roberto Aguayo 43-yard field goal, 9:57. Buccaneers 3–0. **Drive: 7 plays, 37 yards, 3:02.**
- ATL – Matt Bryant 34-yard field goal, 7:13. Tied 3–3. **Drive: 5 plays, 59 yards, 2:44.**
- ATL – Mohamed Sanu 5-yard pass from Matt Ryan (Matt Bryant kick), 0:16. Falcons 10–3. **Drive: 4 plays, 18 yards, 2:20.**

**Second quarter**

- TB – Brandon Myers 4-yard pass from Jameis Winston (Roberto Aguayo kick), 10:31. Tied 10–10. **Drive: 9 plays, 75 yards, 4:46.**
- ATL – Matt Bryant 34-yard field goal, 1:50. Falcons 13–10. **Drive: 7 plays, 45 yards, 3:14.**
- TB – Charles Sims 23-yard pass from Jameis Winston (Roberto Aguayo kick), 0:24. Buccaneers 17–13. **Drive: 10 plays, 75 yards, 1:31.**

**Third quarter**

- TB – Austin Seferian-Jenkins 30-yard pass from Jameis Winston (Roberto Aguayo kick), 13:02. Buccaneers 24–13. **Drive: 4 plays, 75 yards, 2:06.**
- TB – Mike Evans 45-yard pass from Jameis Winston (Robert Aguayo kick), 5:21. Buccaneers 31–13. **Drive: 7 plays, 92 yards, 3:16.**
- ATL – Julio Jones 25-yard pass from Matt Ryan (Matt Ryan–Mohamed Sanu pass), 1:42. Buccaneers 31–21. **Drive: 9 plays, 71 yards, 3:37.**

**Fourth quarter**

- ATL – Matt Bryant 29-yard field goal, 4:59. Buccaneers 31–24. **Drive: 11 plays, 49 yards, 4:54.**

**Top passers**

- TB – Jameis Winston – 23/32, 281 yards, 4 TD, INT
- ATL – Matt Ryan – 27/39, 334 yards, 2 TD

**Top rushers**

- TB – Doug Martin – 18 rushes, 62 yards
- ATL – Tevin Coleman – 8 rushes, 22 yards

**Top receivers**

- TB – Mike Evans – 5 receptions, 99 yards, TD
- ATL – Tevin Coleman – 5 receptions, 95 yards

Quarterback Jameis Winston threw for 281 yards and four touchdown passes, as Tampa Bay defeated Atlanta 31–24. The Buccaneers jumped out to a 31–13 lead late in the third quarter, then held off a rally by the Falcons. Atlanta got the ball back trailing by 7 with just under two minutes to go, but managed only one first down, and turned the ball over on downs to end the game.

==== Week 2: at Arizona Cardinals ====
Week Two: Tampa Bay Buccaneers at Arizona Cardinals – Game summary

Quarter	1	2	3	4	Total
Buccaneers	0	0	7	0	**7**
**Cardinals**	0	24	9	7	**40**

at University of Phoenix Stadium, Glendale, Arizona

- Date: September 18
- Game time: 4:05 p.m. EDT/1:05 p.m. Arizona time
- Game weather: Played indoors (retractable roof closed)
- Game attendance: 64,230
- Referee: Ronald Torbert
- TV announcers (Fox): Thom Brennaman, Charles Davis and Peter Schrager
- Recap, Gamebook

Game information

**First quarter**

- No scoring plays

**Second quarter**

- ARI – Larry Fitzgerald 4-yard pass from Carson Palmer (Chandler Catanzaro kick), 14:59. Cardinals 7–0. **Drive: 11 plays, 57 yards, 5:12.**
- ARI – Chandler Catanzaro 22-yard field goal, 11:48. Cardinals 10–0. **Drive: 6 plays, 14 yards, 2:21.**
- ARI – Michael Floyd 1-yard pass from Carson Palmer (Chandler Catanzaro kick), 1:35. Cardinals 17–0. **Drive: 8 plays, 68 yards, 1:36.**
- ARI – Jaron Brown 51-yard pass from Carson Palmer (Chandler Catanzaro kick), 0:26. Cardinals 24–0. **Drive: 4 plays, 84 yards, 0:45.**

**Third quarter**

- TB – Mike Evans 19-yard pass from Jameis Winston (Roberto Aguayo kick), 10:06. Cardinals 24–7. **Drive: 11 plays, 75 yards, 4:59.**
- ARI – Chandler Catanzaro 40-yard field goal, 8:00. Cardinals 27–7. **Drive: 5 plays, 53 yards, 2:05.**
- ARI – Marcus Cooper 60-yard interception return (kick failed, wide left), 5:15. Cardinals 33–7.

**Fourth quarter**

- ARI – Chris Johnson 3-yard run (Chandler Catanzaro kick), 12:15. Cardinals 40–7. **Drive: 8 plays, 65 yards, 4:47.**

**Top passers**

- TB – Jameis Winston – 27/52, 243 yards, TD, 4 INT
- ARI – Carson Palmer – 17/30, 304 yards, 3 TD

**Top rushers**

- TB – Jacquizz Rodgers – 2 rushes, 29 yards
- ARI – Chris Johnson – 16 rushes, 54 yards, TD

**Top receivers**

- TB – Mike Evans – 6 receptions, 70 yards, TD
- ARI – David Johnson – 3 receptions, 98 yards

Arizona routed Tampa Bay 40–7. Quarterback Jameis Winston threw four interceptions and lost one fumble. Running back Doug Martin left the game in the second quarter with a hamstring injury.

==== Week 3: vs. Los Angeles Rams ====
Week Three: Los Angeles Rams at Tampa Bay Buccaneers – Game summary

Quarter	1	2	3	4	Total
**Rams**	10	7	7	13	**37**
Buccaneers	6	14	0	12	**32**

at Raymond James Stadium, Tampa, Florida

- Date: September 25
- Game time: 4:05 p.m. EDT
- Game weather: 91 °F (32.8 °C), cloudy
- Game attendance: 55,009
- Referee: Ed Hochuli
- TV announcers (Fox): Dick Stockton, Chris Spielman and Kristina Pink
- Recap, Gamebook

Game information

**First quarter**

- LA – Brian Quick 44-yard pass from Case Keenum (Greg Zuerlein kick), 12:05. Rams 7–0. **Drive: 8 plays, 75 yards, 3:02.**
- TB – Kwon Alexander 38-yard interception return (kick failed, wide left), 8:54. Rams 7–6.
- LA – Greg Zuerlein 53-yard field goal, 2:31. Rams 10–6. **Drive: 8 plays, 53 yards, 3:42.**

**Second quarter**

- TB – Charles Sims 1-yard run (Roberto Aguayo kick), 12:27. Buccaneers 13–10. **Drive: 9 plays, 75 yards, 5:03.**
- TB – Cameron Brate 3-yard pass from Jameis Winston (Roberto Aguayo kick), 6:10. Buccaneers 20–10. **Drive: 9 plays, 57 yards, 4:48.**
- LA – Todd Gurley 1-yard run (Greg Zuerlein kick), 0:28. Buccaneers 20–17. **Drive: 7 plays, 78 yards, 2:01.**

**Third quarter**

- LA – Todd Gurley 1-yard run (Greg Zuerlein kick), 0:53. Rams 24–20. **Drive 8 plays, 69 yards, 3:52.**

**Fourth quarter**

- LA – Ethan Westbrooks 77-yard fumble return (Greg Zuerlein kick), 11:56. Rams 31–20.
- TB – Cameron Brate 1-yard touchdown (pass failed), 9:00. Rams 31–26. **Drive: 7 plays, 75 yards, 2:44.**
- LA – Tavon Austin 43-yard pass from Case Keenum (run failed), 3:39. Rams 37–26. **Drive: 7 plays, 75 yards, 4:17.**
- TB – Mike Evans 7-yard pass from Jameis Winston (pass failed), 2:24. Rams 37–32. **Drive 11 plays, 75 yards, 2:23.**

**Top passers**

- LA – Case Keenum – 14/26, 190 yards, 2 TD, INT
- TB – Jameis Winston – 36/58, 405 yards, 3 TD, INT

**Top rushers**

- LA – Todd Gurley – 27 rushes, 87 yards, TD
- TB – Charles Sims – 13 rushes, 55 yards, TD

**Top receivers**

- LA – Tavon Austin – 5 receptions, 82 yards, TD
- TB – Mike Evans – 10 receptions, 132 yards, TD

With Los Angeles leading 37–32 at two minute warning, the game was suspended for an hour and ten minutes due to lightning in the area. When the game resumed, the Rams faced 3rd & 11 at their own 5 yard line. Case Keenum threw an incompletion, and the Rams punted to Tampa Bay. Jameis Winston drove the Buccaneers to the Rams 15 yard line in the final minute. With 4 seconds left in regulation, Winston rolled out to his left, but with no receivers open, scrambled 10 yards downfield, and was tackled at the 5 yard line to end the game.

==== Week 4: vs. Denver Broncos ====
Week Four: Denver Broncos at Tampa Bay Buccaneers – Game summary

Quarter	1	2	3	4	Total
**Broncos**	7	10	3	7	**27**
Buccaneers	7	0	0	0	**7**

at Raymond James Stadium, Tampa, Florida

- Date: October 2
- Game time: 4:05 p.m. EDT
- Game weather: 88 °F (31.1 °C), cloudy
- Game attendance: 60,375
- Referee: Jerome Boger
- TV announcers (CBS): Spero Dedes and Solomon Wilcots
- Recap, Gamebook

Game information

**First quarter**

- DEN – Demaryius Thomas 11-yard pass from Trevor Siemian (Brandon McManus kick), 13:26. Broncos 7–0. **Drive: 1 play, 11 yards, 0:05.**
- TB – Jameis Winston 7-yard run (Roberto Aguayo kick), 6:40. Tied 7–7. **Drive: 13 plays, 75 yards, 6:46.**

**Second quarter**

- DEN – C. J. Anderson 1-yard run (Brandon McManus kick), 12:14. Broncos 14–7. **Drive: 2 plays, 27 yards, 0:56.**
- DEN – Brandon McManus 38-yard field goal, 0:05. Broncos 17–7. **Drive: 9 plays, 47 yards, 1:14.**

**Third quarter**

- DEN – Brandon McManus 24-yard field goal, 7:04. Broncos 20–7. **Drive: 16 plays, 69 yards, 7:57.**

**Fourth quarter**

- DEN – Emmanuel Sanders 5-yard pass from Paxton Lynch (Brandon McManus kick), 8:55. Broncos 27–7. **Drive: 9 plays, 80 yards, 4:39.**

**Top passers**

- DEN – Paxton Lynch – 14/24, 170 yards, TD
- TB – Jameis Winston – 17/35, 179 yards, 2 INT

**Top rushers**

- DEN – C. J. Anderson – 19 rushes, 49 yards, TD
- TB – Charles Sims – 15 rushes, 28 yards

**Top receivers**

- DEN – Demaryius Thomas – 6 receptions, 94 yards, TD
- TB – Cameron Brate – 5 receptions, 67 yards

For the second consecutive week, Tampa Bay endured a weather delay. Midway through the fourth quarter, the game was suspended for 90 minutes due to lightning. Denver defeated Tampa Bay 27–7. Jameis Winston ran for a touchdown, but threw two interceptions in the loss.

==== Week 5: at Carolina Panthers ====
Week Five: Tampa Bay Buccaneers at Carolina Panthers – Game summary

Quarter	1	2	3	4	Total
**Buccaneers**	3	3	8	3	**17**
Panthers	0	0	14	0	**14**

at Bank of America Stadium, Charlotte, North Carolina

- Date: October 10
- Game time: 8:30 p.m. EDT
- Game weather: 66 °F (18.9 °C), clear
- Game attendance: 73,425
- Referee: Clete Blakeman
- TV announcers (ESPN): Sean McDonough, Jon Gruden and Lisa Salters
- Recap, Gamebook

Game information

**First quarter**

- TB – Roberto Aguayo 35-yard field goal, 6:32. Buccaneers 3–0. **Drive: 15 plays, 58 yards, 8:32.**

**Second quarter**

- TB – Roberto Aguayo 35-yard field goal, 0:48. Buccaneers 6–0. **Drive: 9 plays, 41 yards, 3:22.**

**Third quarter**

- CAR – Cameron Artis-Payne 1-yard run (Graham Gano kick), 9:12. Panthers 7–6. **Drive: 11 plays, 75 yards, 5:48.**
- CAR – Cameron Artis-Payne 12-yard run (Graham Gano kick), 6:11. Panthers 14–6. **Drive: 5 plays, 68 yards, 1:45.**
- TB – Mike Evans 26-yard pass from Jameis Winston (Jameis Winston–Adam Humphries pass), 4:34. Tied 14–14. **Drive: 4 plays, 75 yards, 1:36.**

**Fourth quarter**

- TB – Roberto Aguayo 38-yard field goal, 0:03. Buccaneers 17–14. **Drive: 11 plays, 66 yards, 1:49.**

**Top passers**

- TB – Jameis Winston – 18/30, 219 yards, TD
- CAR – Derek Anderson – 18/28, 278 yards, 2 INT

**Top rushers**

- TB – Jacquizz Rodgers – 30 rushes, 101 yards
- CAR – Cameron Artis-Payne – 18 rushes, 85 yards, 2 TD

**Top receivers**

- TB – Mike Evans – 6 receptions, 89 yards, TD
- CAR – Greg Olsen – 9 receptions, 181 yards

Tampa Bay snapped Carolina's six game winning streak in the series, as the two clubs met on Monday Night Football. With Cam Newton sidelined due to concussion protocol, Derek Anderson started for Carolina. Anderson threw two interceptions and lost one fumble. With the game tied 14-14, Tampa Bay drove to the Panthers 20 yard line in the final minute. After missing two attempts earlier in the game, Roberto Aguayo kicked a 38-yard game-winning field goal as time expired.

==== Week 7: at San Francisco 49ers ====
Week Seven: Tampa Bay Buccaneers at San Francisco 49ers – Game summary

Quarter	1	2	3	4	Total
**Buccaneers**	0	17	10	7	**34**
49ers	14	0	0	3	**17**

at Levi's Stadium, Santa Clara, California

- Date: October 23
- Game time: 4:05 p.m. EDT/1:05 p.m. PDT
- Game weather: 68 °F (20 °C), clear
- Game attendance: 70,178
- Referee: Pete Morelli
- TV announcers (Fox): Chris Myers, Ronde Barber and Jennifer Hale
- Recap, Gamebook

Game information

**First quarter**

- SF – Mike Davis 4-yard run (Phil Dawson kick), 13:04. 49ers 7–0. **Drive 5 plays, 75 yards, 1:58.**
- SF – Shaun Draughn 17-yard pass from Colin Kaepernick (Phil Dawson kick), 0:16. 49ers 14–0. **Drive: 1 play, 17 yards, 0:08.**

**Second quarter**

- TB – Mike Evans 4-yard pass from Jameis Winston (Roberto Aguayo kick), 10:20. 49ers 14–7. **Drive: 11 plays, 94 yards, 4:54.**
- TB – Roberto Aguayo 38-yard field goal, 5:04. 49ers 14–10. **Drive: 6 plays, 57 yards, 2:39.**
- TB – Russell Shepard 19-yard pass from Jameis Winston (Roberto Aguayo kick), 0:53. Buccaneers 17–14. **Drive: 8 plays, 77 yards, 1:46.**

**Third quarter**

- TB – Roberto Aguayo 37-yard field goal, 11:02. Buccaneers 20–14. **Drive: 5 plays, 45 yards, 2:01.**
- TB – Mike Evans 5-yard pass from Jameis Winston (Roberto Aguayo kick), 6:30. Buccaneers 27–14. **Drive: 6 plays, 73 yards, 2:03.**

**Fourth quarter**

- SF – Phil Dawson 28-yard field goal, 8:12. Buccaneers 27–17. **Drive: 14 plays, 50 yards, 6:04.**
- TB – Peyton Barber 44-yard run (Roberto Aguayo kick), 4:51. Buccaneers 34–17. **Drive: 6 plays, 77 yards, 3:26.**

**Top passers**

- TB – Jameis Winston – 21/30, 269 yards, 3 TD, INT
- SF – Colin Kaepernick – 16/34, 143 yards, TD, INT

**Top rushers**

- TB – Jacquizz Rodgers – 26 rushes, 154 yards
- SF – Colin Kaepernick – 9 rushes, 84 yards

**Top receivers**

- TB – Mike Evans – 8 receptions, 96 yards, 2 TD
- SF – Shaun Draughn – 5 receptions, 37 yards, TD

Jameis Winston threw for 269 yards and three touchdown passes, while Jacquizz Rodgers rushed for 154 yards. After falling behind 14–0, Tampa Bay scored 27 unanswered points, and pulled away for a 34–17 victory.

==== Week 8: vs. Oakland Raiders ====
Week Eight: Oakland Raiders at Tampa Bay Buccaneers – Game summary

Quarter	1	2	3	4	OT	Total
**Raiders**	0	3	14	7	6	**30**
Buccaneers	3	7	0	14	0	**24**

at Raymond James Stadium, Tampa, Florida

- Date: October 30
- Game time: 1:00 p.m. EDT
- Game weather: 86 °F (30 °C), clear
- Game attendance: 61,068
- Referee: Terry McAulay
- TV announcers (CBS): Andrew Catalon, Steve Beuerlein, Steve Tasker and Chris Fischer
- Recap, Gamebook

Game information

**First quarter**

- TB – Roberto Aguayo 41-yard field goal, 3:59. Buccaneers 3–0. **Drive: 12 plays, 67 yards, 6:31.**

**Second quarter**

- TB – Russell Shepard 19-yard pass from Jameis Winston (Roberto Aguayo kick), 15:00. Buccaneers 10–0. **Drive: 3 plays, 34 yards, 1:21.**
- OAK – Sebastian Janikowski 31-yard field goal, 8:19. Buccaneers 10–3. **Drive: 5 plays, 58 yards, 2:06.**

**Third quarter**

- OAK – Donald Penn 1-yard pass from Derek Carr (Sebastian Janikowski kick), 10:30. Tied 10–10. **Drive: 8 plays, 75 yards, 4:36.**
- OAK – Amari Cooper 34-yard pass from Derek Carr (Sebastian Janikowski kick, 5:38. Raiders 17–10. **Drive: 7 plays, 67 yards, 3:43.**

**Fourth quarter**

- TB – Cameron Brate 5-yard pass from Jameis Winston (Kick failed, wide left), 15:00. Raiders 17–16. **Drive: 3 plays, 47 yards, 1:12.**
- TB – Jacquizz Rodgers 1-yard run (Jameis Winston–Mike Evans pass), 3:53. Buccaneers 24–17. **Drive: 9 plays, 82 yards, 4:45.**
- OAK – Mychal Rivera 7-yard pass from Derek Carr (Sebastian Janikowski kick), 1:43. Tied 24–24. **Drive: 9 plays, 75 yards, 2:10.**

**Overtime**

- OAK – Seth Roberts 41-yard pass from Derek Carr, 1:55. Raiders 30–24. 'Drive: 5 plays, 60 yards, 1:36.

**Top passers**

- OAK – Derek Carr – 40/59, 513 yards, 4 TD
- TB – Jameis Winston – 16/32, 180 yards, 2 TD

**Top rushers**

- OAK – Latavius Murray – 11 rushes, 48 yards
- TB – Jacquizz Rodgers – 19 rushes, 69 yards, TD

**Top receivers**

- OAK – Amari Cooper – 12 receptions, 173 yards, TD
- TB – Adam Humphries – 3 receptions, 58 yards

In this Super Bowl XXXVII rematch, Raiders quarterback Derek Carr threw for 513 yards and four touchdown passes as the Raiders won in overtime. With 1:55 remaining in the overtime period, on a 4th down & 3, Carr threw a game-winning 41-yard touchdown pass to Seth Roberts.

==== Week 9: vs. Atlanta Falcons ====
Week Nine: Atlanta Falcons at Tampa Bay Buccaneers – Game summary

Quarter	1	2	3	4	Total
**Falcons**	10	10	13	10	**43**
Buccaneers	7	7	0	14	**28**

at Raymond James Stadium, Tampa, Florida

- Date: November 3
- Game time: 8:25 p.m. EDT
- Game weather: 76 °F (24.4 °C), clear
- Game attendance: 57,797
- Referee: Ronald Torbert
- TV announcers (NFLN): Al Michaels, Cris Collinsworth and Heather Cox
- Recap, Gamebook

Game information

**First quarter**

- TB – Mike Evans 3-yard pass from Jameis Winston (Roberto Aguayo kick), 9:37. Buccaneers 7–0. **Drive: 13 plays, 75 yards, 5:32.**
- ATL – Levine Toilolo 32-yard pass from Matt Ryan (Matt Bryant kick), 7:47. Tied 7–7. **Drive: 5 plays, 75 yards, 1:49.**
- ATL – Matt Bryant 29-yard field goal, 6:12. Falcons 10–7. **Drive: 4 plays, 3 yards, 0:56.**

**Second quarter**

- ATL – Matt Bryant 41-yard field goal, 13:42. Falcons 13–7. **Drive: 8 plays, 38 yards, 3:02.**
- TB – Mike Evans 24-yard pass from Jameis Winston (Roberto Aguayo kick), 8:43. Buccaneers 14–13. **Drive: 2 plays, 24 yards, 0:23.**
- ATL – Taylor Gabriel 9-yard run (Matt Bryant kick), 4:01. Falcons 20–14. **Drive: 9 plays, 74 yards, 4:39.**

**Third quarter**

- ATL – Patrick DiMarco 1-yard pass from Matt Ryan (pass failed), 8:59. Falcons 26–14. **Drive: 11 plays, 86 yards, 6:06.**
- ATL – Julio Jones 3-yard pass from Matt Ryan (Matt Bryant kick), 3:07. Falcons 33–14. **Drive: 10 plays, 82 yards, 4:52.**

**Fourth quarter**

- ATL – Austin Hooper 2-yard pass from Matt Ryan (Matt Bryant kick), 10:00. Falcons 40–14. **Drive: 9 plays, 57 yards, 4:43.**
- TB – Adam Humphries 7-yard pass from Jameis Winston (run failed), 6:53. Falcons 40–20. **Drive: 11 plays, 75 yards, 3:09.**
- ATL – Matt Bryant 50-yard field goal, 3:47. Falcons 43–20. **Drive: 6 plays, 12 yards, 3:05.**
- TB – Cameron Brate 2-yard pass from Mike Glennon (Mike Glennon–Brandon Myers pass), 1:01. Falcons 43–28. **Drive: 11 plays, 75 yards, 2:43.**

**Top passers**

- ATL – Matt Ryan – 25/34, 344 yards, 4 TD
- TB – Jameis Winston – 23/37, 261 yards, 3 TD

**Top rushers**

- ATL – Devonta Freeman – 17 rushes, 77 yards
- TB – Peyton Barber – 11 rushes, 31 yards

**Top receivers**

- ATL – Julio Jones – 8 receptions, 111 yards, TD
- TB – Mike Evans – 11 receptions, 150 yards, 2 TD

Tampa Bay's only highlight came in the fourth quarter when Mike Evans made a spectacular one-handed sideline catch. However, he was hit and left the game with a concussion. He did finish on a solid note with 11 receptions along with 150 yards and two scores.

==== Week 10: vs. Chicago Bears ====
Week Ten: Chicago Bears at Tampa Bay Buccaneers – Game summary

Quarter	1	2	3	4	Total
Bears	3	7	0	0	**10**
**Buccaneers**	7	10	12	7	**36**

at Raymond James Stadium, Tampa, Florida

- Date: November 13
- Game time: 1:00 p.m. EST
- Game weather: 81 °F (27.2 °C), cloudy
- Game attendance: 62,898
- Referee: Walt Coleman
- TV announcers (Fox): Dan Hellie, David Diehl and Holly Sonders
- Recap, Gamebook

Game information

**First quarter**

- TB – Chris Conte 20-yard interception return (Roberto Aguayo kick), 5:42. Buccaneers 7–0.
- CHI – Connor Barth 54-yard field goal, 2:47. Buccaneers 7–3. **Drive: 6 plays, 50 yards, 2:52.**

**Second quarter**

- TB – Cameron Brate 10-yard pass from Jameis Winston (Roberto Agauyo kick), 3:38. Buccaneers 14–3. **Drive: 4 plays, 29 yards, 2:04.**
- TB – Roberto Aguayo 30-yard field goal, 0:35. Buccaneers 17–3. **Drive: 8 plays, 41 yards, 1:14.**
- CHI – Cameron Meredith 50-yard pass from Jay Cutler (Connor Barth kick), 0:05. Buccaneers 17–10. **Drive: 4 plays, 83 yards, 0:31.**

**Third quarter**

- TB – Freddie Martino 43-yard pass from Jameis Winston (Roberto Aguayo kick), 13:13. Buccaneers 24–10. **Drive: 4 plays, 77 yards, 1:55.**
- TB – Roberto Aguayo 27-yard field goal, 5:23. Buccaneers 27–10. **Drive: 11 plays, 52 yards, 5:58.**
- TB – Jay Cutler sacked by Robert Ayers in the endzone for a safety, 0:58. Buccaneers 29–10.

**Fourth quarter**

- TB – Doug Martin 1-yard run (Roberto Aguayo kick), 6:00. Buccaneers 36–10. **Drive: 17 plays, 62 yards, 9:56.**

**Top passers**

- CHI – Jay Cutler – 16/30, 182 yards, TD, 2 INT
- TB – Jameis Winston – 23/33, 312 yards, 2 TD, INT

**Top rushers**

- CHI – Jordan Howard – 15 rushes, 100 yards
- TB – Peyton Barber – 12 rushes, 38 yards

**Top receivers**

- CHI – Cameron Meredith – 1 reception, 50 yards
- TB – Cameron Brate – 7 receptions, 84 yards, TD

Tampa Bay beat Chicago in dominating fashion for their first home victory of the season. Chris Conte intercepted a Jay Cutler pass and returned the ball 20 yards for a touchdown in the first quarter to start the scoring. Jameis Winston threw for 312 yards and two touchdowns, including a busted play and scramble to his own endzone which resulted in a remarkable 39-yard completion to Mike Evans. Doug Martin returned to the lineup, and scored a rushing touchdown.

==== Week 11: at Kansas City Chiefs ====
Week Eleven: Tampa Bay Buccaneers at Kansas City Chiefs – Game summary

Quarter	1	2	3	4	Total
**Buccaneers**	0	9	3	7	**19**
Chiefs	3	7	0	7	**17**

at Arrowhead Stadium, Kansas City, Missouri

- Date: November 20
- Game time: 1:00 p.m. EST/12:00 p.m. CST
- Game weather: 46 °F (7.8 °C), sunny
- Game attendance: 72,277
- Referee: Ed Hochuli
- TV announcers (Fox): Kenny Albert, Daryl Johnston and Laura Okmin
- Recap, Gamebook

Game information

**First quarter**

- KC – Cairo Santos 22-yard field goal, 7:10. Chiefs 3–0. **Drive: 14 plays, 74 yards, 7:53.**

**Second quarter**

- TB – Roberto Aguayo 31-yard field goal, 9:49. Tied 3–3. **Drive: 9 plays, 62 yards, 4:28.**
- TB – Roberto Aguayo 22-yard field goal, 4:22. Buccaneers 6–3. **Drive: 10 plays, 63 yards, 4:20.**
- KC – Alex Smith 11-yard run (Cairo Santos kick), 1:20. Chiefs 10–6. **Drive: 6 plays, 80 yards, 3:06.**
- TB – Roberto Aguayo 41-yard field goal, 0:11. Chiefs 10–9. **Drive: 9 plays, 52 yards, 1:06.**

**Third quarter**

- TB – Roberto Aguayo 36-yard field goal, 10:06. Buccaneers 12–10. **Drive: 12 plays, 58 yards, 5:00.**

**Fourth quarter**

- TB – Alan Cross 3-yard pass from Jameis Winston (Roberto Aguayo kick), 6:30. Buccaneers 19–10. **Drive: 9 plays, 52 yards, 5:42.**
- KC – Albert Wilson 3-yard pass from Alex Smith (Cairo Santos kick), 2:29. Buccaneers 19–17. **Drive: 12 plays, 78 yards, 3:59.**

**Top passers**

- TB – Jameis Winston – 24/39, 331 yards, TD
- KC – Alex Smith – 24/31, 261 yards, TD, INT

**Top rushers**

- TB – Doug Martin – 24 rushes, 63 yards
- KC – Spencer Ware – 17 rushes, 69 yards

**Top receivers**

- TB – Mike Evans – 6 receptions, 105 yards
- KC – Travis Kelce – 7 receptions, 108 yards

Tampa Bay won their second straight game, this one against a team that was highly favored to win. Jameis Winston threw for over 300 yards while Mike Evans received for over 100 yards. The offense was efficient, especially on third down where they went 11 of 15. The defense came up big as well, with safety Chris Conte getting an interception in the end zone, his second straight game with a pick. Rookie kicker Roberto Aguyao, who has struggled throughout the season, went 5/5 on kicks, making 4 field goals and 1 extra point. With this win, the Bucs got back to .500, took sole possession of second place in the NFC South, and improved their road record to 4-1.

==== Week 12: vs. Seattle Seahawks ====
Week Twelve: Seattle Seahawks at Tampa Bay Buccaneers – Game summary

Quarter	1	2	3	4	Total
Seahawks	0	5	0	0	**5**
**Buccaneers**	14	0	0	0	**14**

at Raymond James Stadium, Tampa, Florida

- Date: November 27
- Game time: 4:05 p.m. EST
- Game weather: 81 °F (27.2 °C), cloudy
- Game attendance: 63,674
- Referee: Bill Vinovich
- TV announcers (Fox): Kenny Albert, Daryl Johnston and Laura Okmin
- Recap, Gamebook

Game information

**First quarter**

- TB – Mike Evans 3-yard pass from Jameis Winston (Roberto Aguayo kick), 7:41. Buccaneers 7–0. **Drive: 14 plays, 78 yards, 7:26.**
- TB – Mike Evans 23-yard pass from Jameis Winston (Roberto Aguayo kick), 3:00. Buccaneers 14–0. **Drive: 5 plays, 62 yards, 3:01.**

**Second quarter**

- SEA – Penalty on Luke Stocker enforced in the end zone for a safety, 13:29. Buccaneers 14–2.
- SEA – Steven Hauschka 43-yard field goal, 10:43. Buccaneers 14–5. **Drive: 8 plays, 47 yards, 2:44.**

**Third quarter**

- No scoring plays

**Fourth quarter**

- No scoring plays

**Top passers**

- SEA – Russell Wilson – 17/33, 151 yards, 2 INT
- TB – Jameis Winston – 21/28, 220 yards, 2 TD, INT

**Top rushers**

- SEA – Russell Wilson – 8 rushes, 80 yards
- TB – Doug Martin – 23 rushes, 87 yards

**Top receivers**

- SEA – Jimmy Graham – 6 receptions, 67 yards
- TB – Mike Evans – 8 receptions, 104 yards, 2 TD

Coming into a game where Seattle was highly favored to win, Tampa Bay earned their third straight win in impressive fashion. After scoring two Winston to Evans touchdowns in the first quarter, the defense held up and didn't allow any offensive touchdowns. The only points scored against them were a safety after a holding call in the endzone and a Seattle field goal. The defense also held Seattle to just one 3rd down conversion on 11 attempts, with the sole conversion coming in the 4th quarter. Seattle QB Russell Wilson was sacked six times and two of his passes were intercepted, one of those interceptions coming from CB Alterraun Verner. With this upset win, the Bucs moved over .500 for the first time through 11 games since 2012, and sits a half a game behind the final wildcard spot.

==== Week 13: at San Diego Chargers ====
Week Thirteen: Tampa Bay Buccaneers at San Diego Chargers – Game summary

Quarter	1	2	3	4	Total
**Buccaneers**	7	0	10	11	**28**
Chargers	7	7	7	0	**21**

at Qualcomm Stadium, San Diego, California

- Date: December 4
- Game time: 4:25 p.m. EST/1:25 p.m. PST
- Game weather: 72 °F (22.2 °C), sunny
- Game attendance: 53,832
- Referee: John Hussey
- TV announcers (Fox): Sam Rosen, David Diehl and Holly Sonders
- Recap, Gamebook

Game information

**First quarter**

- SD – Dontrelle Inman 35-yard pass from Philip Rivers (Josh Lambo kick), 11:03. Chargers 7–0. **Drive: 8 plays, 75 yards, 4:07.**
- TB – Doug Martin 2-yard run (Roberto Aguayo kick), 1:15. Tied 7–7. **Drive: 8 plays, 54 yards, 4:26.**

**Second quarter**

- SD – Melvin Gordon 2-yard run (Josh Lambo kick), 10:08. Chargers 14–7. **Drive: 11 plays, 61 yards, 6:04.**

**Third quarter**

- TB – Roberto Aguayo 27-yard field goal, 8:29. Chargers 14–10. **Drive: 13 plays, 66 yards, 6:35.**
- TB – Lavonte David 15-yard interception return (Roberto Aguayo kick), 4:32. Buccaneers 17–14.
- SD – Tyrell Williams 40-yard pass from Philip Rivers (Josh Lambo kick), 1:42. Chargers 21–17. **Drive: 5 plays, 75 yards, 2:52.**

**Fourth quarter**

- TB – Roberto Aguayo 35-yard field goal, 13:07. Chargers 21–20. **Drive: 8 plays, 59 yards, 3:30.**
- TB – Cameron Brate 12-yard touchdown pass from Jameis Winston (Jameis Winston–Mike Evans pass), 9:06. Buccaneers 28–21. **Drive: 4 plays, 54 yards, 2:14.**

**Top passers**

- TB – Jameis Winston – 20/30, 280 yards, TD, INT
- SD – Philip Rivers – 15/26, 225 yards, 2 TD, 2 INT

**Top rushers**

- TB – Doug Martin – 17 rushes, 84 yards, TD
- SD – Melvin Gordon – 17 rushes, 45 yards, TD

**Top receivers**

- TB – Cameron Brate – 6 receptions, 84 yards, TD
- SD – Melvin Gordon – 4 receptions, 54 yards

The Bucs won their fourth consecutive game. After being down at the half 14–7, the Bucs outscored the Chargers 21–7 in the second half. The win gives the Bucs a 7–5 record (5–1 on the road) and since the Redskins (6–4–1) lost, the Bucs took over the final wildcard spot. Also since the Falcons (7–5) lost, they are now tied with them atop the NFC South. After the game, the Week 15 matchup against the Dallas Cowboys was flexed from a normal 1 p.m. kickoff to Sunday Night Football.

==== Week 14: vs. New Orleans Saints ====
Week Fourteen: New Orleans Saints at Tampa Bay Buccaneers – Game summary

Quarter	1	2	3	4	Total
Saints	0	8	3	0	**11**
**Buccaneers**	3	10	0	3	**16**

at Raymond James Stadium, Tampa, Florida

- Date: December 11
- Game time: 4:25 p.m. EST
- Game weather: 79 °F (26.1 °C), cloudy
- Game attendance: 62,140
- Referee: Walt Anderson
- TV announcers (Fox): Thom Brennaman, Charles Davis, Chris Spielman and Peter Schrager
- Recap, Gamebook

Game information

**First quarter**

- TB – Roberto Aguayo 41-yard field goal, 8:05. Buccaneers 3–0. **Drive: 9 plays, 48 yards, 3:00.**

**Second quarter**

- TB – Doug Martin 1-yard run (Roberto Aguayo kick), 14:50. Buccaneers 10–0. **Drive: 11 plays, 75 yards, 6:37.**
- TB – Roberto Aguayo 39-yard field goal, 8:26. Buccaneers 13–0. **Drive: 10 plays, 50 yards, 4:45.**
- NO – Wil Lutz 42-yard field goal, 5:29. Buccaneers 13–3. **Drive: 7 plays, 52 yards, 2:57.**
- NO – Doug Martin tackled in the end zone by Paul Kruger for a safety, 5:20. Buccaneers 13–5.
- NO – Wil Lutz 34-yard field goal, 0:00. Buccaneers 13–8. **Drive: 14 plays, 35 yards, 5:20.**

**Third quarter**

- NO – Wil Lutz 22-yard field goal, 3:35. Buccaneers 13–11. **Drive: 11 plays, 76 yards, 5:29.**

**Fourth quarter**

- TB – Roberto Aguayo 26-yard field goal, 12:46. Buccaneers 16–11. **Drive: 13 plays, 68 yards, 5:49.**

**Top passers**

- NO – Drew Brees – 25/41, 257 yards, 3 INT
- TB – Jameis Winston – 16/26, 184 yards

**Top rushers**

- NO – Tim Hightower – 6 rushes, 31 yards
- TB – Doug Martin – 23 rushes, 66 yards, TD

**Top receivers**

- NO – Willie Snead IV – 6 receptions, 85 yards
- TB – Cameron Brate – 4 receptions, 47 yards

The Buccaneers won their fifth consecutive game after another impressive showing from the defense. The defense picked off Drew Brees three times, including one to seal the win. They also held the Saints offense to zero offensive touchdowns. The win puts the Buccaneers at 8–5, and they now have a chance to finish the season with a record over .500, the first since the 2010 season.

==== Week 15: at Dallas Cowboys ====
Week Fifteen: Tampa Bay Buccaneers at Dallas Cowboys – Game summary

Quarter	1	2	3	4	Total
Buccaneers	3	3	14	0	**20**
**Cowboys**	0	17	0	9	**26**

at AT&T Stadium, Arlington, Texas

- Date: December 18
- Game time: 8:30 p.m. EST/7:30 p.m. CST
- Game weather: Played indoors (roof retracted)
- Game attendance: 93,101
- Referee: Terry McAulay
- TV announcers (NBC): Al Michaels, Cris Collinsworth, and Michele Tafoya
- Recap, Gamebook

Game information

**First quarter**

- TB – Roberto Aguayo 25-yard field goal, 5:54. Buccaneers 3–0. **Drive: 9 plays, 47 yards, 3:52.**

**Second quarter**

- DAL – Dan Bailey 27-yard field goal, 14:56. Tied 3–3. **Drive: 11 plays, 65 yards, 5:58.**
- DAL – Ezekiel Elliott 2-yard run (Dan Bailey kick), 12:34. Cowboys 10–3. **Drive: 5 plays, 14 yards, 2:11.**
- DAL – Dak Prescott 2-yard run (Dan Bailey kick), 6:24. Cowboys 17–3. **Drive: 10 plays, 64 yards, 5:13.**
- TB – Roberto Aguayo 34-yard field goal, 1:52. Cowboys 17–6. **Drive: 11 plays, 59 yards, 4:32.**

**Third quarter**

- TB – Adam Humphries 42-yard pass from Jameis Winston (Roberto Aguayo kick), 11:44. Cowboys 17–13. **Drive: 8 plays, 75 yards, 3:16.**
- TB – Cameron Brate 10-yard pass from Jameis Winston (Roberto Aguayo kick), 4:12. Buccaneers 20–17. **Drive: 10 plays, 81 yards, 4:49.**

**Fourth quarter**

- DAL – Dan Bailey 40-yard field goal,13:31. Tied 20–20. **Drive: 10 plays, 58 yards, 5:41.**
- DAL – Dan Bailey 38-yard field goal, 9:35. Cowboys 23–20. **Drive: 4 plays, 2 yards, 2:14.**
- DAL – Dan Bailey 33-yard field goal, 2:58. Cowboys 26–20. **Drive: 8 plays, 81 yards, 3:57.**

**Top passers**

- TB – Jameis Winston – 17/35, 247 yards, 2 TD
- DAL – Dak Prescott – 32/36, 279 yards

**Top rushers**

- TB – Doug Martin – 16 rushes, 42 yards
- DAL – Ezekiel Elliott – 23 rushes, 159 yards, TD

**Top receivers**

- TB – Cameron Brate – 5 receptions, 73 yards, TD
- DAL – Dez Bryant – 8 receptions, 82 yards

The Buccaneers five-game winning streak came to an end with this loss. After being down 17–6 at the half, the Bucs came out hot in the second half scoring two touchdowns on throws to receiver Adam Humphries and tight end Cameron Brate, taking a 20–17 lead going into the fourth quarter. After three Dallas field goals in the fourth, the Bucs had a chance to drive down the field for a last second touchdown. On 4th down with around 30 seconds remaining, Winston threw an interception to seal the game. With the loss, the Buccaneers move to 8–6 on the season.

==== Week 16: at New Orleans Saints ====
Week Sixteen: Tampa Bay Buccaneers at New Orleans Saints – Game summary

Quarter	1	2	3	4	Total
Buccaneers	0	7	14	3	**24**
**Saints**	7	6	15	3	**31**

at Mercedes-Benz Superdome, New Orleans, Louisiana

- Date: December 24
- Game time: 4:25 p.m. EST/3:25 p.m. CST
- Game weather: Played indoors (dome stadium)
- Game attendance: 73,177
- Referee: Jerome Boger
- TV announcers (Fox): Kenny Albert, Daryl Johnston and Laura Okmin
- Recap, Gamebook

Game information

**First quarter**

- NO – Mark Ingram II 6-yard run (Wil Lutz kick), 0:57. Saints 7–0. **Drive: 11 plays, 91 yards, 6:32.**

**Second quarter**

- TB – Cameron Brate 12-yard pass from Jameis Winston (Roberto Aguayo kick), 10:50. Tied 7–7. **Drive: 4 plays, 39 yards, 1:13.**
- NO – Wil Lutz 42-yard field goal, 6:45. Saints 10–7. **Drive: 10 plays, 51 yards, 4:05.**
- NO – Wil Lutz 34-yard field goal, 0:00. Saints 13–7. **Drive: 10 plays, 57 yards, 3:38.**

**Third quarter**

- NO – Mark Ingram II 14-yard run (Wil Lutz kick), 14:01. Saints 20–7. **Drive: 1 play, 14 yards, 0:05.**
- TB – Jacquizz Rodgers 3-yard run (Roberto Aguayo kick), 8:38. Saints 20–14. **Drive: 10 plays, 75 yards, 5:23.**
- NO – Travaris Cadet 11-yard pass from Drew Brees (Mark Ingram II run), 6:20. Saints 28–14. **Drive: 6 plays, 75 yards, 2:18.**
- TB – Mike Evans 34-yard pass from Jameis Winston (Roberto Aguayo kick), 1:52. Saints 28–21. **Drive: 8 plays, 75 yards, 4:28.**

**Fourth quarter**

- NO – Wil Lutz 21-yard field goal, 11:55. Saints 31–21. **Drive: 11 plays, 72 yards, 4:57.**
- TB – Roberto Aguayo 35-yard field goal, 2:00. Saints 31–24. **Drive: 10 plays, 40 yards, 2:33.**

**Top passers**

- TB – Jameis Winston – 23/35, 277 yards, 2 TD, 2 INT
- NO – Drew Brees – 23/34, 299 yards, TD

**Top rushers**

- TB – Jacquizz Rodgers – 15 rushes, 63 yards, TD
- NO – Mark Ingram II – 18 rushes, 90 yards, 2 TD

**Top receivers**

- TB – Mike Evans – 7 receptions, 97 yards, TD
- NO – Brandin Cooks – 5 receptions, 98 yards

The Bucs' playoff hopes took hits after a second loss in a row, this time to the New Orleans Saints. Their defense was shaky, as they allowed 13 points in the first half of the game, and 18 points in the second half. This put the Bucs outside the playoff picture, and left them requiring victory in week 17 as well as hoping for the Washington Redskins and the Green Bay Packers to both lose. Mark Ingram II scored two touchdowns, during the game, and Jameis Winston was picked off twice during the game, unlike the previous meeting of the two teams a couple weeks ago.

==== Week 17: vs. Carolina Panthers ====
Week Seventeen: Carolina Panthers at Tampa Bay Buccaneers – Game summary

Quarter	1	2	3	4	Total
Panthers	7	0	3	6	**16**
**Buccaneers**	3	0	7	7	**17**

at Raymond James Stadium, Tampa, Florida

- Date: January 1, 2017
- Game time: 1:00 p.m. EST
- Game weather: 81 °F (27.2 °C), cloudy
- Game attendance: 62,037
- Referee: Carl Cheffers
- TV announcers (Fox): Thom Brennaman, Charles Davis, Chris Spielman and Peter Schager
- Recap, Gamebook

Game information

**First quarter**

- TB – Roberto Aguayo 33-yard field goal, 11:02. Buccaneers 3–0. **Drive: 10 plays, 60 yards, 3:58.**
- CAR – Jonathan Stewart 2-yard run (Graham Gano kick), 8:22. Panthers 7–3. **Drive: 6 plays, 75 yards, 2:40.**

**Second quarter**

- No scoring plays

**Third quarter**

- TB – Brent Grimes 31-yard interception return (Roberto Aguayo kick), 14:19. Buccaneers 10–7.
- CAR – Graham Gano 54-yard field goal, 6:37. Tied 10–10. **Drive: 7 plays, 50 yards, 3:08.**

**Fourth quarter**

- TB – Mike Evans 10-yard pass from Jameis Winston (Roberto Aguayo kick), 3:13. Buccaneers 17–10. **Drive: 8 plays, 74 yards, 2:52.**
- CAR – Kelvin Benjamin 5-yard pass from Cam Newton (pass failed), 0:17. Buccaneers 17–16. **Drive: 10 plays, 74 yards, 2:56.**

**Top passers**

- CAR – Cam Newton – 18/32, 237 yards, TD, 3 INT
- TB – Jameis Winston – 20/35, 202 yards, TD, INT

**Top rushers**

- CAR – Jonathan Stewart – 20 rushes, 65 yards, TD
- TB – Jacquizz Rodgers – 17 rushes, 75 yards

**Top receivers**

- CAR – Kelvin Benjamin – 6 receptions, 93 yards, TD
- TB – Adam Humphries – 10 receptions, 94 yards

The Bucs closed out the season sweeping the season series against Carolina. The game came down to the wire, with Carolina coming within one after scoring a touchdown with 17 seconds left to play. Instead of tying it up with an extra point, Carolina failed on an attempted two-point conversion. In addition to this win, the Buccaneers' playoff hopes required six other Week 17 results (including a tie between the New York Giants and Washington Redskins) to fall their way in order to secure a strength-of-victory tiebreaker over the Green Bay Packers for the final wild-card berth. They were officially eliminated from playoff contention after the New York Giants defeated the Washington Redskins. However, they finished 9–7, their first winning record since finishing 10–6 in the 2010 season, and would pick 19th overall in the upcoming NFL draft.

== Standings ==
=== Division ===
NFC South
	W	L	T	PCT	DIV	CONF	PF	PA	STK
^{(2)} Atlanta Falcons	11	5	0	.688	5–1	9–3	540	406	W4
Tampa Bay Buccaneers	9	7	0	.563	4–2	7–5	354	369	W1
New Orleans Saints	7	9	0	.438	2–4	6–6	469	454	L1
Carolina Panthers	6	10	0	.375	1–5	5–7	369	402	L2

=== Conference ===
NFC
#	Team	Division	W	L	T	PCT	DIV	CONF	SOS	SOV	STK
Division leaders
1	Dallas Cowboys	East	13	3	0	.813	3–3	9–3	.471	.440	L1
2	Atlanta Falcons	South	11	5	0	.688	5–1	9–3	.480	.452	W4
3	Seattle Seahawks	West	10	5	1	.656	3–2–1	6–5–1	.441	.425	W1
4	Green Bay Packers	North	10	6	0	.625	5–1	8–4	.508	.453	W6
Wild Cards
5	New York Giants	East	11	5	0	.688	4–2	8–4	.486	.455	W1
6 (Note: Detroit finished ahead of Tampa Bay for the No. 6 seed and qualified for the last playoff spot based on record vs. common opponents—Detroit's cumulative record against Chicago, Dallas, Los Angeles and New Orleans was 3–2, while Tampa Bay's cumulative record against the same four teams was 2–3.)	Detroit Lions	North	9	7	0	.563	3–3	7–5	.475	.392	L3
Did not qualify for the postseason
7	Tampa Bay Buccaneers	South	9	7	0	.563	4–2	7–5	.492	.434	W1
8	Washington Redskins	East	8	7	1	.531	3–3	6–6	.516	.430	L1
9	Minnesota Vikings	North	8	8	0	.500	2–4	5–7	.492	.457	W1
10	Arizona Cardinals	West	7	8	1	.469	4–1–1	6–5–1	.463	.366	W2
11 (Note: New Orleans finished ahead of Philadelphia based on better record vs. conference opponents.)	New Orleans Saints	South	7	9	0	.438	2–4	6–6	.523	.393	L1
12	Philadelphia Eagles	East	7	9	0	.438	2–4	5–7	.559	.518	W2
13	Carolina Panthers	South	6	10	0	.375	1–5	5–7	.518	.354	L2
14	Los Angeles Rams	West	4	12	0	.250	2–4	3–9	.504	.500	L7
15	Chicago Bears	North	3	13	0	.188	2–4	3–9	.521	.396	L4
16	San Francisco 49ers	West	2	14	0	.125	2–4	2–10	.504	.250	L1
Tiebreakers (Note: When breaking ties for three or more teams under the NFL's rules, they are first broken within divisions, then comparing only the highest-ranked remaining team from each division.)

== Awards ==
- Week 1: NFC Offensive Player of the Week – Jameis Winston
- Week 1: FedEx Air Player of the Week – Jameis Winston
- Week 5: Castrol Edge Clutch Performer of the Week – Roberto Aguayo
- Week 11: NFC Special Teams Player of the Week – Roberto Aguayo
- Week 12: Pepsi Next Rookie of the Week – Noah Spence
- November: Defensive Rookie of the Month – Noah Spence
- Week 14: Castrol Edge Clutch Performer of the Week – Keith Tandy
- Week 17: NFC Special Teams Player of the Week – Bryan Anger
- Week 17: Castrol Edge Clutch Performer of the Week – Mike Evans
- Bridgestone Performance Play of the Year – Jameis Winston & Mike Evans
