= Alan Cross (American football) =

American football player (born 1993)

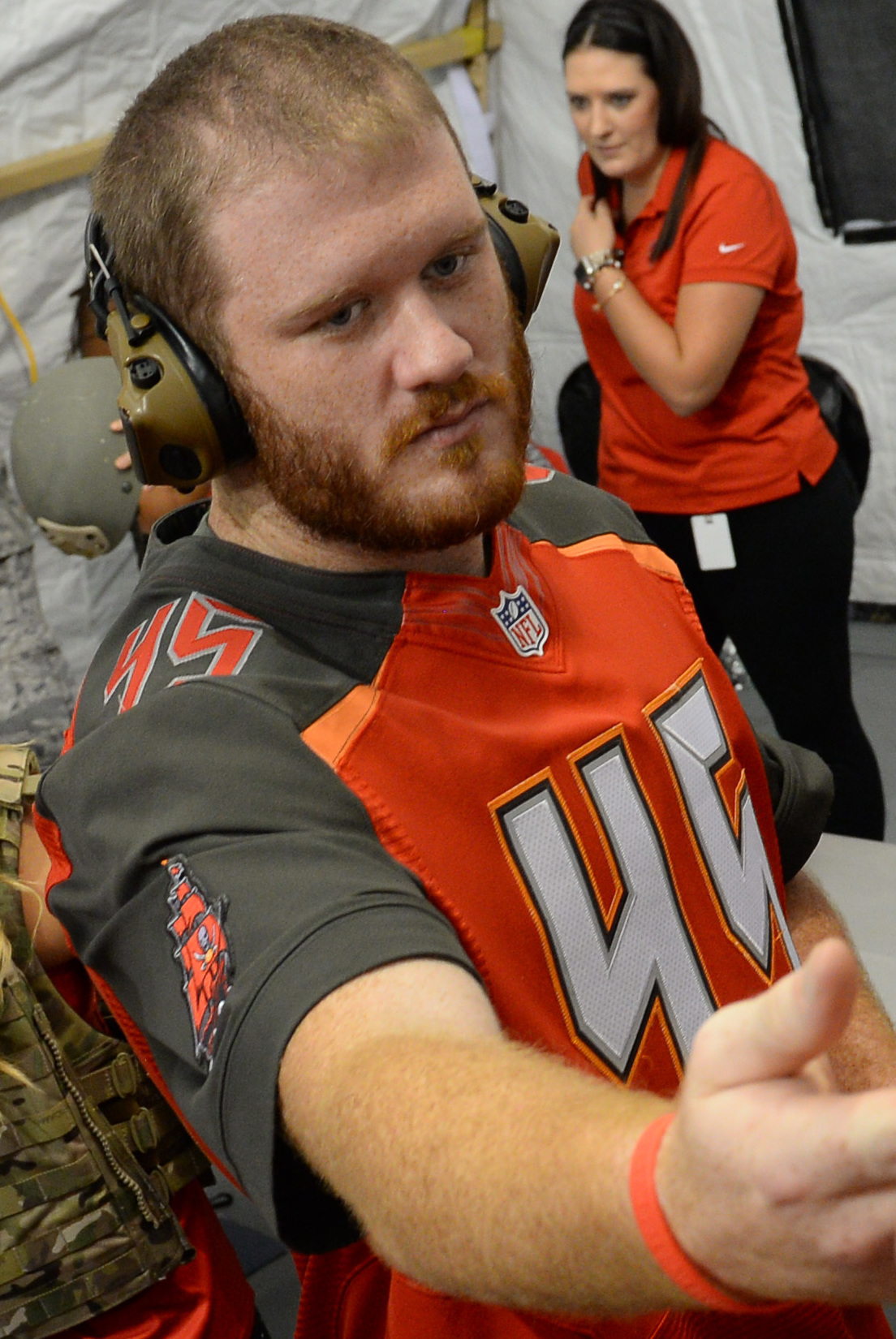
- Cross at MacDill Air Force Base with the Tampa Bay Buccaneers in 2017

No. 45
- Position: Tight end

Personal information
- Born: July 2, 1993 (age 33); Millington, Tennessee, U.S.
- Listed height: 6 ft 1 in (1.85 m)
- Listed weight: 235 lb (107 kg)

Career information
- High school: Millington Central
- College: Memphis
- NFL draft: 2016: undrafted

Career history
- Tampa Bay Buccaneers (2016–2018)

Career NFL statistics
- Receptions: 13
- Receiving yards: 105
- Receiving touchdowns: 1
- Stats at Pro Football Reference

Alan Cross (born July 2, 1993) is an American former professional football player who was a tight end and fullback for the Tampa Bay Buccaneers of the National Football League (NFL). He played college football for the Memphis Tigers and attended Millington Central High School in Millington, Tennessee.

== Professional career ==
Pre-draft measurables
Height	Weight	40-yard dash	10-yard split	20-yard split	20-yard shuttle	Three-cone drill	Vertical jump	Broad jump	Bench press
6 ft 1 in (1.85 m)	240 lb (109 kg)	4.84 s	1.75 s	2.81 s	4.58 s	7.44 s	30 1/2 in (0.77 m)	9 ft 1 in (2.77 m)	17 reps
All values from Memphis' Pro Day

After going undrafted in the 2016 NFL draft, Cross signed with the Tampa Bay Buccaneers on May 2, 2016. He entered training camp competing for to be the Buccaneer's fourth or fifth tight end with Kivon Cartwright and Dan Vitale. On September 10, 2016, Cross was released by the Buccaneers. Three days later, he was signed to the Buccaneers' practice squad. He was promoted to the active roster after the arrest and release of Austin Seferian-Jenkins.

He became the Buccaneer's fourth tight end behind veterans Cameron Brate, Luke Stocker, and Brandon Myers. On September 25, 2016, he made his professional regular season debut during a 32–37 loss to the Los Angeles Rams. Throughout his rookie season, he appeared on special team's punt coverage teams, kick return, and was used as a fullback and blocking tight end.

On October 2, 2017, Cross was waived by the Buccaneers and was signed to the practice squad the next day. He was promoted to the active roster on November 29, 2017.

In 2018, Cross played in 14 games before suffering a shoulder injury in Week 15. He was placed on injured reserve on December 18, 2018.
