= 2016 All-Pro Team =

Official list of the best NFL players in 2016

The 2016 All-Pro teams were named by the Associated Press (AP), Pro Football Writers of America (PFWA), and Sporting News (SN) for performance in the 2016 NFL season. While none of the All-Pro teams have the official imprimatur of the NFL (whose official recognition is nomination to the 2017 Pro Bowl (Note: The 2017 Pro Bowl represents the 2016 NFL season)), they are included in the NFL Record and Fact Book and also part of the language of the 2011 NFLPA Collective Bargaining Agreement. Any player selected to the first-team of any of the teams can be described as an "All-Pro." The AP team, with first-team and second-team selections, was chosen by a national panel of fifty NFL writers and broadcasters. For the first time, the nationwide panel of 60 sports writers and broadcasters who regularly cover the NFL voted for specific positions on the offensive line, a "flex" player on offense, a fifth defensive back, merged the halfback and fullback positions into the running back position, and a punt returner and special teamer. The Sporting News All-NFL team is voted on by NFL players and executives and will be released at a later date. The PFWA team is selected by its more than 300 national members who are accredited media members covering the NFL.

== Teams ==
Offense
Position	First team	Second team
Quarterback	Matt Ryan, Atlanta (AP, PFWA); Tom Brady, New England (SN)	Tom Brady, New England (AP-2)
Running back	Ezekiel Elliott, Dallas (AP, PFWA, SN); David Johnson, Arizona (PFWA, SN)	David Johnson, Arizona (AP-2)
Flex	David Johnson, Arizona (AP)	Le'Veon Bell, Pittsburgh (AP-2)
Tight end	Travis Kelce, Kansas City (AP, PFWA, SN)	Greg Olsen, Carolina (AP-2)
Wide receiver	Antonio Brown, Pittsburgh (AP, PFWA, SN); Julio Jones, Atlanta (AP, PFWA, SN)	Mike Evans, Tampa Bay (AP-2); Odell Beckham Jr., New York Giants (AP-2)
Left tackle	Tyron Smith, Dallas (AP)	David Bakhtiari, Green Bay; (AP-2)
Left guard	Kelechi Osemele, Oakland (AP)	Marshal Yanda, Baltimore (AP-2)
Center	Travis Frederick, Dallas (AP, PFWA, SN)	Alex Mack, Atlanta (AP-2)
Right guard	Zack Martin, Dallas (AP)	David DeCastro, Pittsburgh (AP-2)
Right tackle	Jack Conklin, Tennessee (AP)	Mitchell Schwartz, Kansas City (AP-2t); Marcus Cannon, New England (AP-2t)
Guard	Kelechi Osemele, Oakland (PFWA, SN); Zack Martin, Dallas (PFWA); Marshal Yanda, Baltimore (SN)	
Tackle	Tyron Smith, Dallas (PFWA, SN); Joe Thomas, Cleveland Browns (PFWA); Trent Williams, Washington Redskins (SN)	

Special teams
Position	First team	Second team
Kicker	Justin Tucker, Baltimore (AP, PFWA, SN)	
Punter	Johnny Hekker, Los Angeles Rams (AP, PFWA); Pat McAfee, Indianapolis Colts (SN)	Marquette King, Oakland (AP-2)
Kick returner	Cordarrelle Patterson, Minnesota (AP, PFWA, SN)	Tyler Lockett, Seattle (AP-2)
Punt returner	Tyreek Hill, Kansas City (AP, PFWA, SN)	
Special teams	Matthew Slater, New England (AP, PFWA)	Nate Ebner, New England (AP-2)

Defense
Position	First team	Second team
Edge rusher	Khalil Mack, Oakland (AP, PFWA, SN); Vic Beasley, Atlanta (AP, PFWA-OLB); Jadeveon Clowney, Houston (PFWA, SN)	Brandon Graham, Philadelphia (AP-2); Jadeveon Clowney, Houston (AP-2); Cameron Wake, Miami (AP-2t); Olivier Vernon, New York Giants (AP-2t)
Interior lineman	Aaron Donald, Los Angeles Rams (AP, PFWA, SN); Damon Harrison, New York Giants (AP, PFWA); Geno Atkins, Cincinnati Bengals (SN)	Ndamukong Suh, Miami (AP-2); Calais Campbell, Arizona Cardinals (AP-2t); Gerald McCoy, Tampa Bay (AP-2t)
Linebacker	Von Miller, Denver (AP, PFWA, SN); Sean Lee, Dallas (AP, PFWA, SN); Bobby Wagner, Seattle (AP); Luke Kuechly, Carolina (SN)	Dont'a Hightower, New England (AP-2); Benardrick McKinney, Houston (AP-2); Whitney Mercilus, Houston (AP-2t); Alec Ogletree, Los Angeles Rams (AP-2t); Zach Orr, Baltimore (AP-2t); Zach Brown, Buffalo (AP-2t); C. J. Mosley, Baltimore (AP-2t); Lavonte David, Tampa Bay (AP-2t); Luke Kuechly, Carolina (AP-2t); Lorenzo Alexander, Buffalo (AP-2t)
Cornerback	Marcus Peters, Kansas City (AP, PFWA, SN); Aqib Talib, Denver (AP, PFWA, SN)	Janoris Jenkins, New York Giants (AP-2); Casey Hayward, San Diego (AP-2t); Malcolm Butler, New England (AP-2t)
Safety	Eric Berry, Kansas City (AP, PFWA, SN); Landon Collins, New York Giants (AP, PFWA, SN)	Ha Ha Clinton-Dix, Green Bay (AP-2); Devin McCourty, New England (AP-2)
Defensive back	Chris Harris, Jr., Denver (AP)	Dominique Rodgers-Cromartie, New York Giants (AP-2)

== Key ==
- AP = Associated Press first-team All-Pro
- AP-2 = Associated Press second-team All-Pro
- AP-2t = Tied for second-team All-Pro in the AP vote
- PFWA = Pro Football Writers Association All-NFL
- SN = Sporting News All-Pro

== Position differences ==
PFWA and SN did not separate the tackles and guards into more specific positions as the AP did.
