= Mike Evans (wide receiver) =

American football player (born 1993)

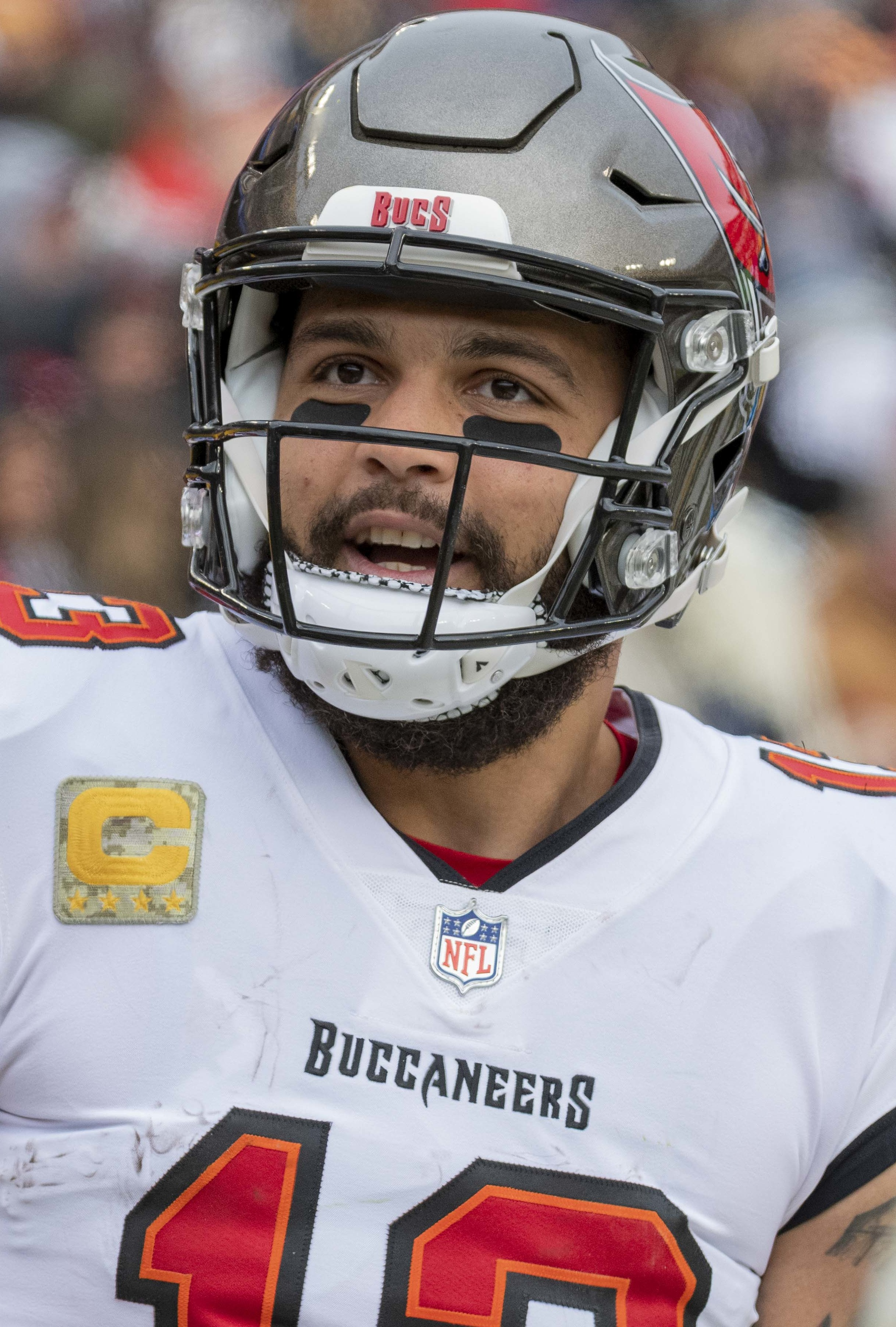
- Evans with the Tampa Bay Buccaneers in 2021

No. 5 – San Francisco 49ers
- Position: Wide receiver
- Roster status: Active

Personal information
- Born: August 21, 1993 (age 33); Galveston, Texas, U.S.
- Listed height: 6 ft 5 in (1.96 m)
- Listed weight: 231 lb (105 kg)

Career information
- High school: Ball (Galveston)
- College: Texas A&M (2011–2013)
- NFL draft: 2014: 1st round, 7th overall pick

Career history
- Tampa Bay Buccaneers (2014–2025); San Francisco 49ers (2026–present)

Awards and highlights
- Super Bowl champion (LV); 2× Second-team All-Pro (2016, 2023); 6× Pro Bowl (2016, 2018, 2019, 2021, 2023, 2024); NFL receiving touchdowns co-leader (2023); PFWA All-Rookie Team (2014); Consensus All-American (2013); First-team All-SEC (2013); NFL records: Consecutive 1,000 yard receiving seasons to start a career: 11; Consecutive 1,000 yard receiving seasons: 11 (tied; Jerry Rice)

Career NFL statistics as of Week 6, 2026
- Receptions: 893
- Receiving yards: 13,472
- Receiving touchdowns: 111
- Stats at Pro Football Reference

Michael Lynn Evans III (born August 21, 1993) is an American professional football wide receiver for the San Francisco 49ers of the National Football League (NFL). He played college football for the Texas A&M Aggies, earning consensus All-American honors in 2013 and setting the school's record for receiving yards. Evans was selected seventh overall by the Tampa Bay Buccaneers in the 2014 NFL draft.

During his 12 seasons with Tampa Bay, Evans led the league in receiving touchdowns in 2023 and earned six Pro Bowl and two second-team All-Pro selections. Evans was also a member of the team that won Super Bowl LV. He holds nearly every major Buccaneers franchise receiving record, including career receptions, yards, and touchdowns. Evans joined the 49ers in 2026.

== Early life ==
Evans attended Ball High School in Galveston, Texas, where he played basketball, football, and ran track for the Tors athletic teams. In basketball, Evans averaged 18.3 points, 8.4 rebounds, and 5.2 assists as a senior. He only played football during his senior year, and was thus not heavily recruited by college football programs. As a senior, Evans earned second-team District 24-4A honors after making 25 receptions for 648 yards and seven touchdowns.

In track & field, Evans competed in the jumping events. He achieved personal-best leaps of 14.11 m in the triple jump and 6.28 m in the long jump. Evans also posted a 4.54 time in the 40-yard dash at football camp and was a member of the 4 × 100m and 4 × 200m relay squads.

Evans was recruited by Texas A&M as a wide receiver and eventually signed to play for the Aggies.

== College career ==
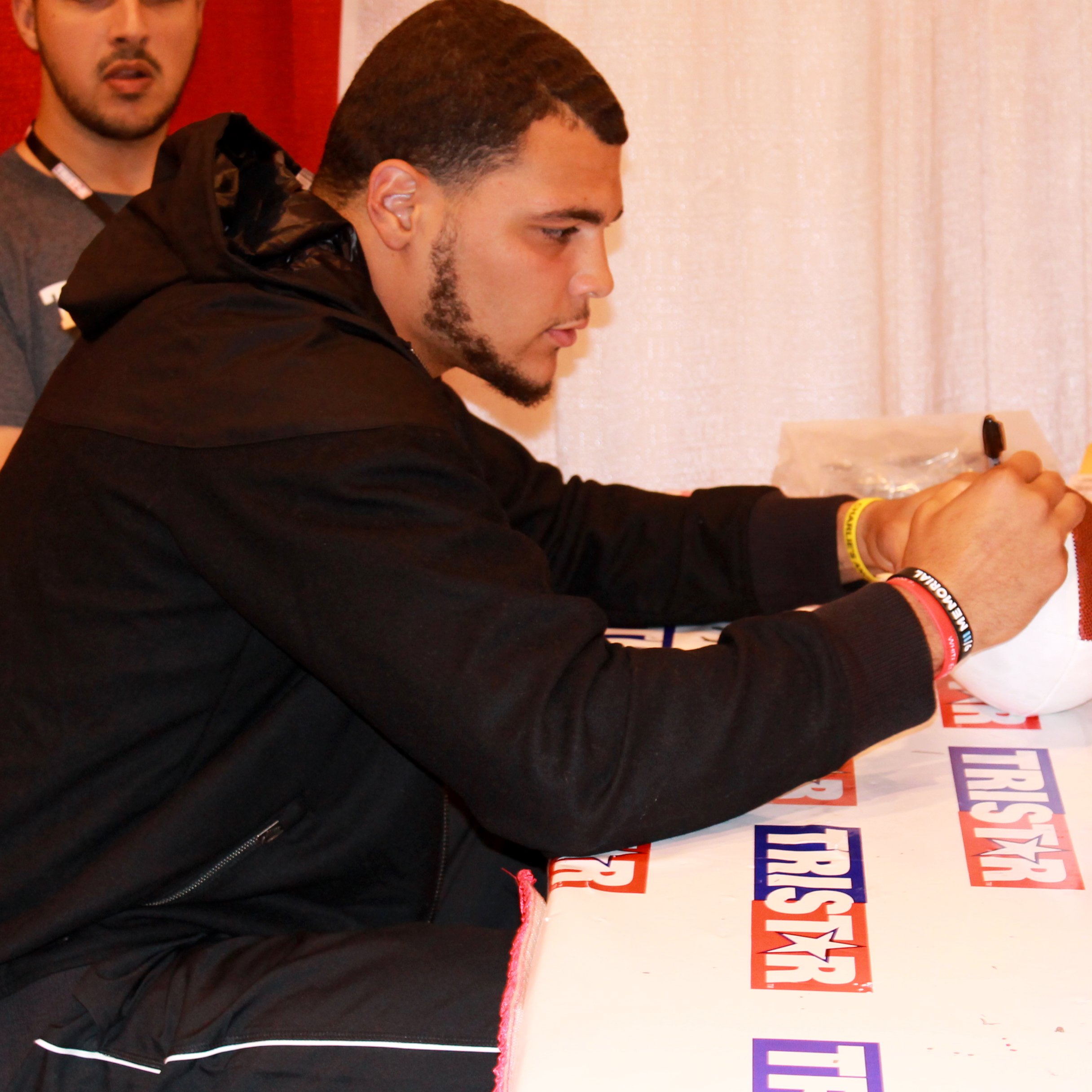
Evans signing autographs in June 2014

While attending Texas A&M University, Evans played for the Texas A&M Aggies football team from 2011 to 2013. After being redshirted as a freshman in 2011, he had 82 receptions for 1,105 yards and five touchdowns in 2012. On the year, Evans recorded three games with at least 100 receiving yards. He received freshman All-Southeastern Conference (SEC) honors from the league's coaches.

In the 2013 game against #1 Alabama, Evans caught seven passes for a school-record 279 yards during the 49–42 loss. During the game against #24 Auburn, he broke his own record after he compiled 11 receptions for 287 yards and four touchdowns.

As a sophomore in 2013, Evans was a first-team All-SEC selection. On December 17, 2013, it was announced that he was selected to the 2013 Associated Press All-America Team, First-team. Evans finished the 2013 season with 69 receptions for 1,394 yards and 12 touchdowns.

== Professional career ==
=== Pre-draft ===
On January 2, 2014, Evans announced that he would forgo his final two seasons of his collegiate eligibility and enter the 2014 NFL draft. The majority of analysts and scouts projected Evans to be a consensus top 10 pick and a first-round draft selection. He was ranked the top wide receiver in the draft by Sports Illustrated and the second-best wide receiver by NFLDraftScout.com.

Pre-draft measurables
Height	Weight	Arm length	Hand span	Wingspan	40-yard dash	10-yard split	20-yard split	20-yard shuttle	Three-cone drill	Vertical jump	Bench press	Wonderlic
6 ft 4 3/4 in (1.95 m)	231 lb (105 kg)	35 1/8 in (0.89 m)	9 5/8 in (0.24 m)	6 ft 10 1/4 in (2.09 m)	4.53 s	1.60 s	2.66 s	4.26 s	7.08 s	37 in (0.94 m)	12 reps	25
All values from NFL Combine

=== Tampa Bay Buccaneers ===
==== 2014 season ====
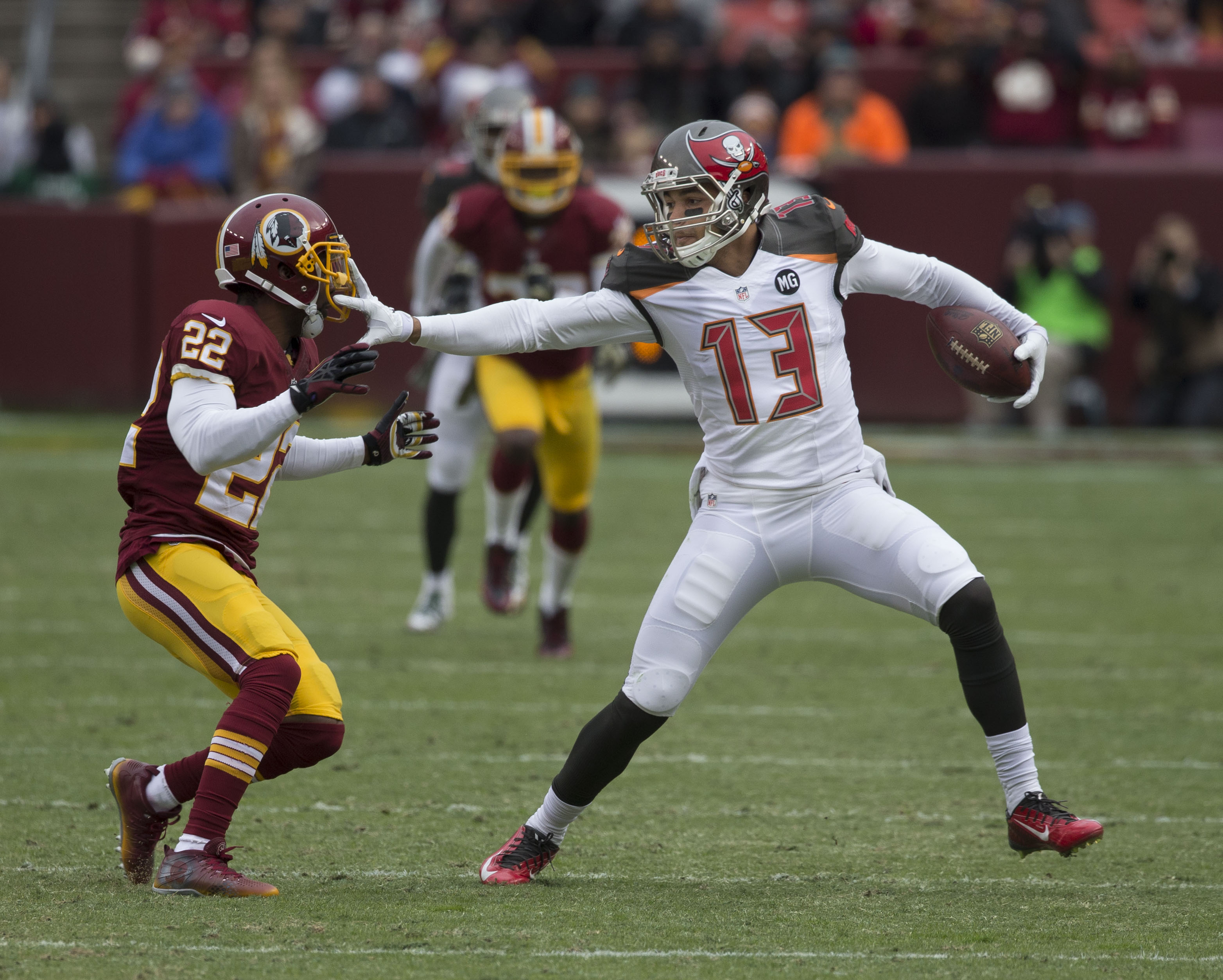
Evans in action during his record-setting game against the Washington Redskins in November 2014

The Tampa Bay Buccaneers selected Evans with the seventh overall pick in the 2014 NFL draft, one pick after his college teammate Jake Matthews. It was the first time Texas A&M had two Top 7 draft picks in the same draft since John Kimbrough and Jim Thomason in 1941. He was the second wide receiver taken after Sammy Watkins was picked by the Buffalo Bills with the fourth overall pick. On June 12, 2014, Evans signed a four-year rookie contract worth $14.6 million, with an $8.96 million signing bonus.

Evans made his professional regular season debut on September 7, 2014, in the Buccaneers' season-opener against the Carolina Panthers, logging five receptions for 37 yards. Three weeks later, he caught four passes for 65 yards, including his first career touchdown on a seven-yard pass from Mike Glennon in a 27–24 victory over the Pittsburgh Steelers. During a Week 9 22–17 loss to the Cleveland Browns, Evans caught seven passes for 124 yards and two touchdowns. The following week, he had seven receptions for 125 yards and a touchdown in a 27–17 loss to the Atlanta Falcons.

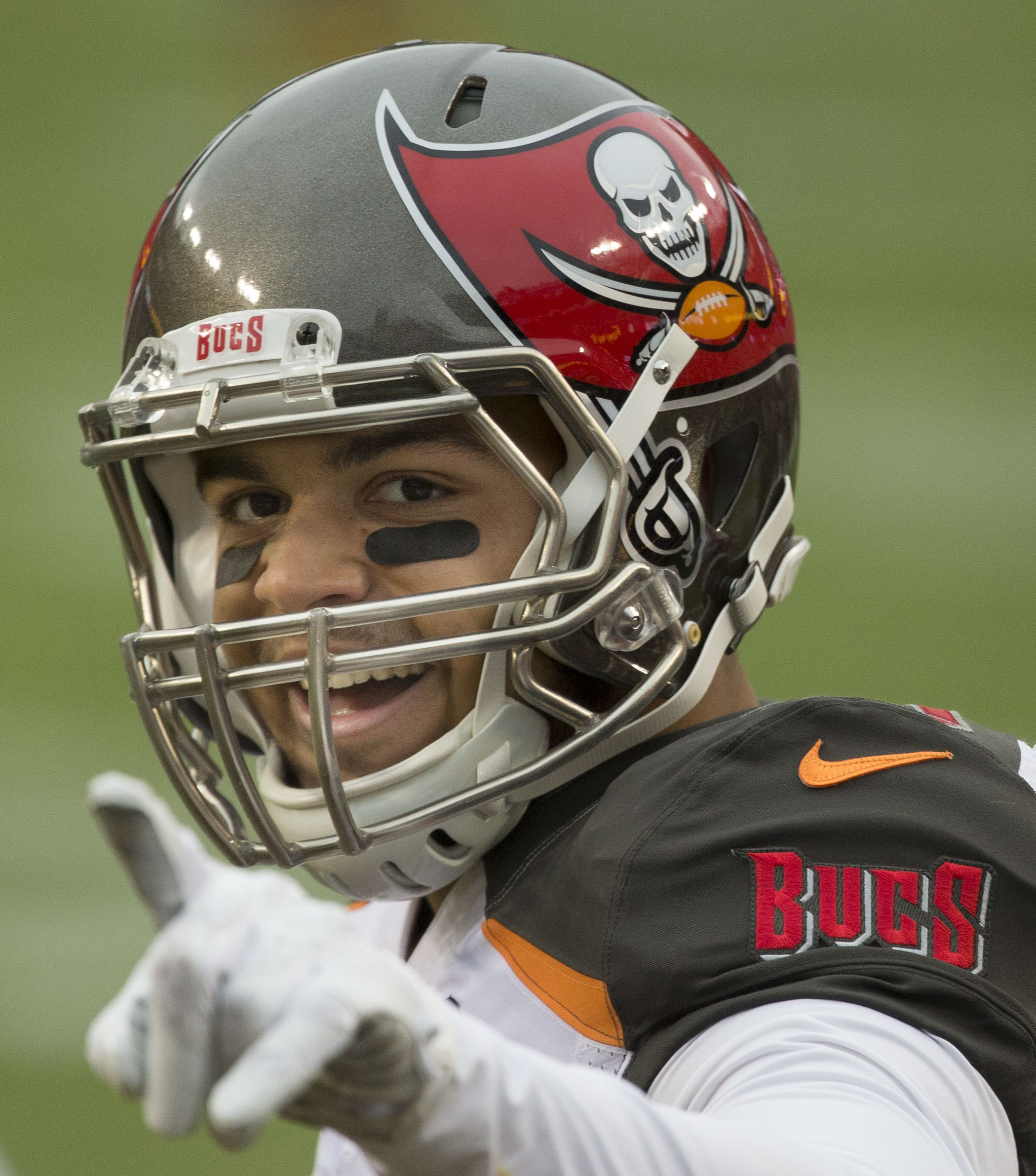
Evans in 2014

On November 16, 2014, in a 27–7 victory over the Washington Redskins, Evans recorded seven receptions for 209 yards and two touchdowns. He became the first rookie receiver to have three consecutive games of 100 yards and at least one touchdown since Randy Moss in 1998. Evans also became the youngest player in NFL history to catch for 200 or more yards in one game. Evans was also the fifth rookie of the Super Bowl era to record 200 receiving yards and two touchdowns in a game, the first player to accomplish that feat since Anquan Boldin in 2003. He received National Football Conference (NFC) Offensive Player of the Week honors for his spectacular performance.

Evans finished his rookie season with 68 receptions for 1,051 yards and 12 touchdowns, setting franchise records and becoming a part of the first pair of Buccaneers receivers (alongside veteran Vincent Jackson) to receive 1,000 yards in a single season together. Evans was ranked tied for fourth in the NFL in receiving touchdowns. He was named to the PFWA All-Rookie Team. He was ranked 75th by his fellow players on the NFL Top 100 Players of 2015.

==== 2015 season ====
On September 20, 2015, Evans appeared in his first game of the season against the New Orleans Saints after missing the season-opener with a hamstring injury. The next week, Evans caught seven passes for 101 yards in a 19–9 loss to the Houston Texans. During Week 7 against the Redskins, Evans caught eight passes for a season-high 164 yards and a touchdown in a 31–30 loss. On November 8, 2015, Evans caught eight passes for 150 yards in a 32–18 loss to the New York Giants. The following game, he finished with another eight receptions for 126 yards during a 10–6 victory over the Dallas Cowboys. On December 17, 2015, he made a season-high nine receptions for 157 yards against the St. Louis Rams.

In 15 games, Evans recorded 74 receptions for 1,206 yards and three touchdowns, with an average of 16.3 yards per catch.

==== 2016 season ====
Evans started the Buccaneers' 2016 season opener, making five receptions for 99 yards and a touchdown in a 31–24 defeat of the Falcons. On September 25, 2016, Evans caught 10 passes for 132 yards and a touchdown in a 37–32 loss to the Los Angeles Rams. Evans became the first player in the Buccaneers' history to catch a touchdown pass in three consecutive games to start a season. During a Week 7 victory over the San Francisco 49ers, Evans caught eight passes for 96 yards and two touchdowns. On November 3, 2016, he caught a season-high 11 passes for 150 yards and two touchdowns in a 43–28 loss to the Falcons. He caught a pass on the sidelines which was debated as the "catch of the year" at NFL.com and suffered a helmet-to-helmet hit on the play and was placed on concussion protocol. On November 27, 2016, he caught eight passes for 104 receiving yards and two touchdowns in a 14–5 victory over the Seattle Seahawks, becoming the fourth player in NFL history to begin his career with three consecutive seasons of 1,000 yards receiving. He was also the first receiver in franchise history with two receiving touchdowns in the first quarter of a game. On December 20, 2016, Evans was selected to the Pro Bowl, the first of his career. His selection made him the first Buccaneers receiver since Vincent Jackson in 2012 to be picked, and the first receiver drafted by the Buccaneers to be selected for the Pro Bowl since Mark Carrier in 1989. On January 1, 2017, Evans caught 5 passes for 65 yards and 1 touchdown in a 17–16 win against the Panthers tying his franchise record of 12 receiving touchdowns in a single season.

Evans finished his third season off with 96 receptions for 1,321 yards and 12 touchdowns in 16 starts. He was ranked 29th by his peers on the NFL Top 100 Players of 2017.

==== 2017 season ====
On April 17, 2017, the Buccaneers picked up the fifth-year option on Evans's contract.

Due to Hurricane Irma, Evans and the Buccaneers had to move their Week 1 game to later in the season. On September 17, 2017, in his season debut in Week 2, Evans recorded seven receptions for 93 yards and a touchdown in the 29–7 victory over the Chicago Bears. Over the next three games, Evans had one touchdown and averaged 61 yards, before a 95-yard performance with a touchdown in the Week 6 loss to the Arizona Cardinals, followed by 88 yards and a touchdown in the loss to the Buffalo Bills. In Week 8, Evans was held to 60 yards before a disastrous Week 9 against the Saints. Not only was Evans held to 13 yards, he involved himself in a fight between Saints rookie Marshon Lattimore and injured teammate Jameis Winston. Evans was not ejected, but flagged for a personal foul, and later suspended one game despite an appeal. He returned with 92- and 78-yard efforts, before two more poor weeks of 25 and 33 yards. In Week 15, Evans had his first touchdown in eight weeks, en route to 79 yards in the loss to the Falcons. Week 16 was Evans' only 100+ yard game of the season, 107 yards on six receptions in another loss to the Panthers. In Week 17's 31–24 win over the New Orleans Saints, Evans became the third receiver in NFL history to begin his career with four consecutive years of 1,000 yards receiving after catching five passes for 55 yards. Overall, he finished the 2017 season with a team-leading 71 receptions for 1,001 yards, but only five touchdowns for the 5–11 Buccaneers.

==== 2018 season ====
On March 9, 2018, Evans signed a five-year, $82.5 million contract extension with the Buccaneers with $55 million guaranteed.

On September 8, Evans caught seven passes for 147 yards and a touchdown in a season-opening 48–40 win over defending the NFC South champion Saints. The next week, Evans caught ten passes for 83 yards and a touchdown in a 27–21 win over the defending Super Bowl champion Philadelphia Eagles. In a 30–27 loss to the Steelers on Monday Night Football in Week 3, Evans caught 6 passes for 137 yards and a touchdown, breaking the Buccaneers franchise record for touchdown receptions in a career with his 35th. He eclipsed 5,000 career yards with 59 yards in Week 4 (at 25 years 40 days, the second youngest player to this mark by 113 days to Randy Moss) and after a bye week, Evans caught four passes for 58 yards in a 34–29 loss to the Falcons, breaking Mark Carrier's Buccaneers franchise record for receiving yards in a career. The following week, Evans caught 7 passes for 107 yards in a 26–23 win over the Browns, his 16th game with 100+ receiving yards, again breaking a Mark Carrier franchise record. Evans then led all NFL receivers in Week 8 with 179 yards (a career second-best) on six receptions in a 37–34 loss to the Cincinnati Bengals, which included a career-long 72 yard reception for a touchdown in the fourth quarter. The next two weeks were far less successful: In Week 9, Evans had just one reception for 16 yards on 10 targets against the Panthers, and three receptions for 51 yards in Week 10. He rebounded in Week 11's 38–35 loss to the Giants with six catches for 120 yards and a touchdown and recovered a fumble by quarterback Jameis Winston in the end zone for another touchdown. In Week 12, he again broke the century mark with 116 yards on six receptions in the 27–9 win over th 49ers. In the game, he passed 1,000 receiving yards on the season, joining Randy Moss and A. J. Green as the only receivers in NFL history to begin their careers with five consecutive 1,000+ yard seasons. In Week 17, during a 34–32 loss to the Falcons, Evans caught six passes for 106 yards and two touchdowns; with that performance Evans broke the Buccaneers franchise record for receiving yards in a single season and became the youngest receiver in league history to reach 6,000 yards receiving in a career.

Evans finished his fifth season with 86 receptions for a career-high 1,524 yards and nine total touchdowns. On January 7, 2019, Evans was selected to his second Pro Bowl as an injury replacement for Julio Jones. As a result, Evans became the first Buccaneers wide receiver in franchise history to be selected to multiple Pro Bowls. He was ranked 53rd by his fellow players on the NFL Top 100 Players of 2019.

==== 2019 season ====
Following a lackluster start to the 2019 season, in which he was recovering from the flu and failed to reach 100 combined yards in the first two weeks, Evans broke out during Week 3 in a 32–31 loss to the Giants, where he caught eight passes for 190 yards and a career-best three touchdown receptions. The following week, Evans caught four passes for 89 yards and a 67-yard touchdown in a 55–40 win over the Rams. After being held without a catch in Week 5 against the Saints, Evans had 96 yards and a two-point conversion in the 37–26 loss to the Panthers. During Week 8 against the Tennessee Titans, Evans finished with 198 receiving yards and two touchdowns in the 27–23 loss, joining Roger Carr (1976) as the only players with two 190-yard receiving games in the first eight weeks of a season since the merger as well as breaking the Buccaneers' franchise record for receptions in a career previously held by James Wilder. During Week 9 against the Seahawks, Evans finished with 180 receiving yards and a touchdown as the Buccaneers lost 40–34 in overtime. The following week, in a 30–27 win over the Cardinals, Evans caught four passes for 82 yards. In the process, Evans became the youngest player in NFL history to reach 7,000 career receiving yards. In Week 12, during a 35–22 win over the Falcons, Evans caught four passes for 50 yards. In the process, Evans joined Randy Moss as the only players in NFL history to begin their careers with six consecutive seasons of at least 1,000 yards receiving. In Week 14, during a 38–35 win over the Indianapolis Colts, Evans caught one pass for 61 yards and a touchdown but injured his hamstring during the play and left the game. On December 17, 2019, Evans was selected to the 2020 Pro Bowl, the third of his career. On December 18, 2019, Evans was placed on injured reserve after suffering a hamstring injury in Week 14.

Evans finished his sixth season with 67 receptions for 1,157 yards and eight touchdowns. He was ranked 30th by his fellow players on the NFL Top 100 Players of 2020.

==== 2020 season ====
In Week 1, during a 34–23 loss to the Saints, Evans only caught one pass for two yards and a touchdown while recovering from a hamstring injury, his first from new Buccaneers quarterback Tom Brady. The following week, Evans bounced back with seven receptions for 104 yards and a touchdown during a 31–17 win against the Panthers. In Week 3, Evans posted a rare statistical line of two receptions for two yards, both for touchdowns, in the 28–10 victory over the Denver Broncos. In Week 4 against the Los Angeles Chargers, Evans recorded seven catches for 122 yards and a touchdown during the 38–31 win. In Week 12, against the Kansas City Chiefs, he had three receptions for 50 yards and two touchdowns in the 27–24 loss. In Week 15, during a 31–27 win over the Falcons, Evans recorded over 100 yards receiving for the first time since Week 4, finishing with six receptions for 110 yards and a touchdown en route to helping the Buccaneers achieve their first winning record in a season since 2016 with their ninth win of the year. In Week 16, during a 47–7 win against the Detroit Lions, Evans recorded a season-best 10 receptions for 181 yards and two touchdowns. In the process, Evans broke the Buccaneers's single season receiving touchdown record he had set twice at 12 with his 13th as well as helped the Buccaneers achieve their tenth win of the season and clinch a playoff spot for the first time since 2007. In Week 17, Evans set an NFL record against the Falcons as the first wide receiver to record 1,000 yards consecutively in each season of his seven-year professional career. Evans injured his knee later in the game.

Evans finished the 2020 regular season with 70 receptions for 1,006 yards and 13 touchdowns. He broke Randy Moss's record with seven consecutive seasons with 1,000 receiving yards.

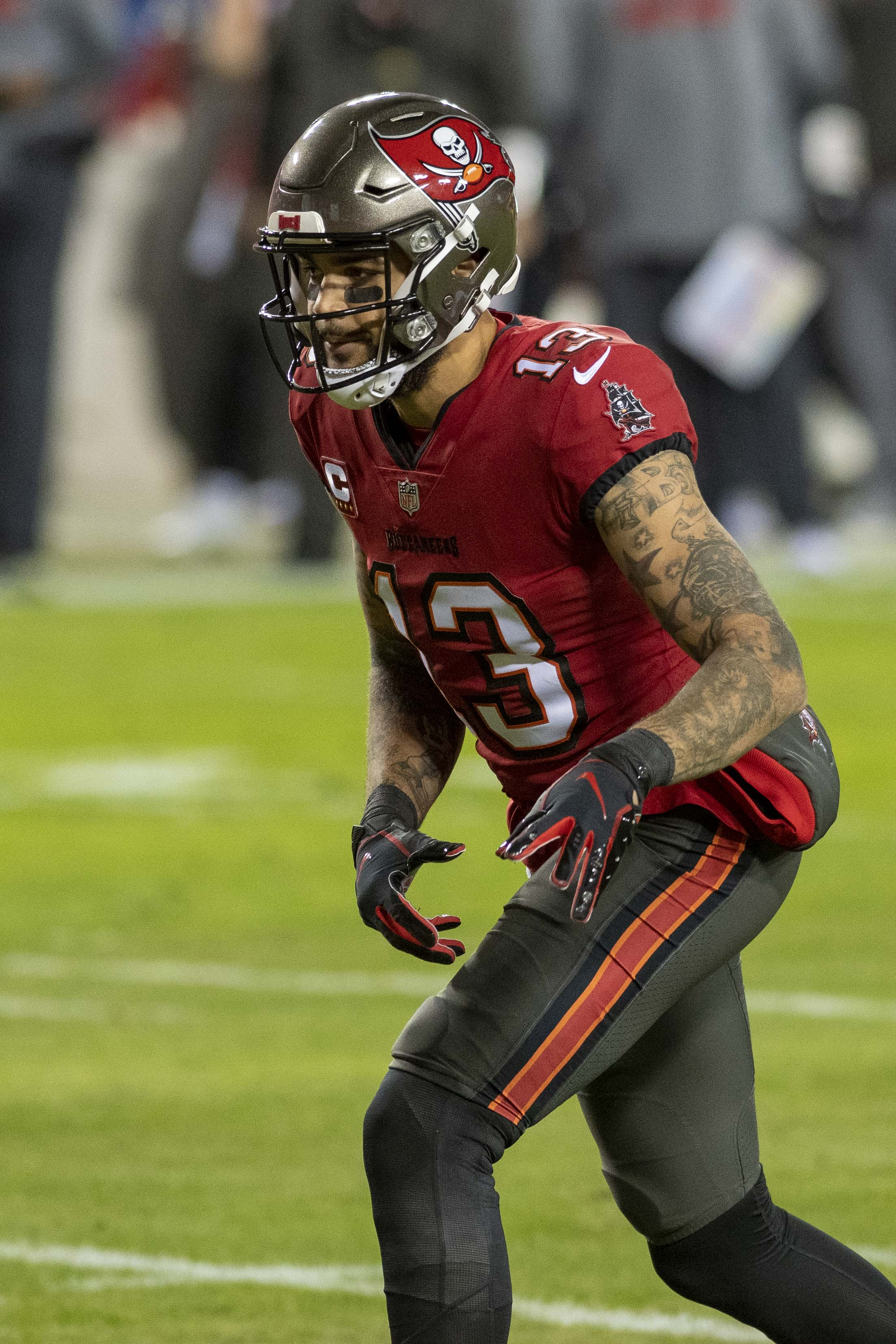
Evans during the 2020 Wild Card Round

In the Wild Card Round of the 2020–21 NFL playoffs, Evans broke the franchise record for receiving yards in a playoff game, finishing with six receptions for 119 yards in a 31–23 win over the Washington Football Team. This was Tampa Bay's first playoff win since Super Bowl XXXVII. In the Divisional Round against the New Orleans Saints, Evans recorded one catch for a three-yard touchdown during the 30–20 win. This was Evans' first playoff touchdown. In the NFC Championship against the Green Bay Packers, Evans recorded three catches for 51 yards and a touchdown during the 31–26 win.

In Super Bowl LV, Evans caught one pass on one target for a 31-yard gain during the 31–9 win over the Kansas City Chiefs, as well as drawing four penalties. This earned Evans his first championship as an NFL player. He was ranked 48th by his fellow players on the NFL Top 100 Players of 2021.

==== 2021 season ====
After a slow start in Week 1, Evans caught five passes for 75 yards and two touchdowns the following week in a 48–25 win against the Falcons. In Week 3, during a 34–24 loss to the Rams, Evans recorded eight catches for 106 yards. In Week 5, Evans caught six passes for 113 yards and two touchdowns in a 45–17 rout of the Miami Dolphins. In Week 7, Evans recorded six catches for 76 yards to go along with three touchdowns, including the milestone 600th touchdown pass from Tom Brady late in the first quarter, in a 38–3 win over the Bears. In Week 11, during a 30–10 win over the Giants, Evans recorded his first career carry for 10 yards as well as six catches for 73 yards and one touchdown. With that score, Evans set the Buccaneer franchise record for touchdowns scored in a career with his 72nd, breaking the previous record of 71 held by Mike Alstott. In Week 15, during a 9–0 loss to the Saints, Evans left the game with a hamstring injury which forced him to miss the next game. In the newly expanded Week 18, during a 41–17 rout of the Panthers, Evans recorded seven receptions for 89 yards and two touchdowns. As a result of that game, Evans not only broke the Buccaneers franchise record for touchdown receptions in a season once again with his 14th but also exceeded 1,000 yards receiving, extending his own NFL record for consecutive seasons of at least 1,000 receiving yards to begin a career with eight.

Evans finished the 2021 regular season with 74 receptions for 1,035 yards and 14 touchdowns. In the Wild Card Round against the Eagles, Evans had nine receptions for 117 yards and a touchdown in the 31–15 victory. In the Divisional Round against the Los Angeles Rams, Evans had eight receptions for 119 yards and a touchdown in the 30–27 loss. On January 26, 2022, Evans was named to his fourth career Pro Bowl as an injury replacement for Packers wide receiver Davante Adams. He was ranked 53rd by his fellow players on the NFL Top 100 Players of 2022.

==== 2022 season ====
In Week 2 against the Saints, Evans was ejected after getting into a fight with Marshon Lattimore in the fourth quarter in the 20–10 win. Evans shoved Lattimore to the turf after Leonard Fournette shoved Lattimore after he exchanged words with Tom Brady. The next day, Evans was suspended one game for his actions. In Week 12, against the Browns, Evans recorded 10,000 career receiving yards. Against the Panthers in Week 17, Evans had 10 catches for 207 yards and three touchdowns in the 30–24 win, earning NFC Offensive Player of the Week. In the 2022 season, Evans had 77 receptions for 1,124 yards and six touchdowns in 15 games and starts. He was ranked 53rd by his fellow players on the NFL Top 100 Players of 2023.

==== 2023 season ====
Heading into the final year of his contract, Evans and his agent both publicly stated that he wanted an extension and gave the Buccaneers until September 9, the day before the team's season opener, to get it done. Despite his desire for an extension, the Buccaneers never offered one, making Evans a free agent after the season.

In a Week 2 matchup against the Bears, Evans caught six passes for a season-high 171 yards, including a 70-yard touchdown. In week 12, he caught seven passes for 162 yards and a touchdown against the Panthers, marking his 10th consecutive season of at least 1,000 receiving yards. This made him the second player in NFL history to do so, behind only Jerry Rice. He earned his fifth Pro Bowl nomination.

Evans finished the 2023 season with 79 receptions for 1,255 yards and tied for the league lead with 13 touchdown receptions. He became the first player in franchise history to at least hold a share of the receiving touchdowns title for a single season.

In the Divisional Round of the playoffs, Evans caught eight passes for 147 yards and a touchdown in the 31–23 loss to the Lions.

He was ranked 26th by his fellow players on the NFL Top 100 Players of 2024.

==== 2024 season ====
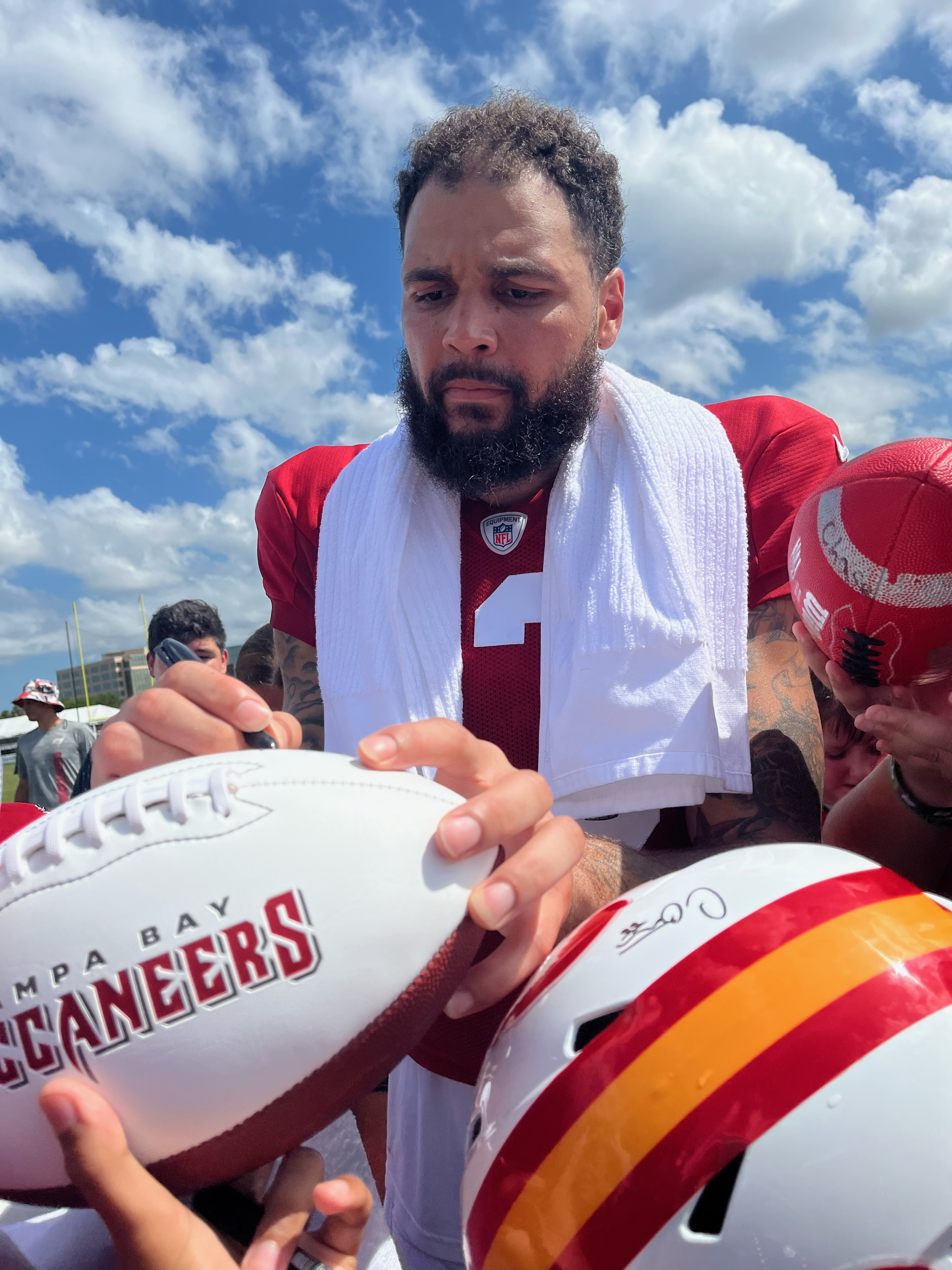
Mike Evans at the Tampa Bay Buccaneers training camp in 2024

On March 4, 2024, Evans signed a two-year, $52 million contract extension with the Buccaneers.

In Week 5 against the Atlanta Falcons, Evans recorded his 100th career touchdown, including playoffs.

In Week 7 against the Baltimore Ravens, Evans caught his 100th career receiving touchdown on a 25-yard pass from Baker Mayfield. With this touchdown catch, he became the eleventh player in NFL history to have at least 100 career receiving touchdowns, the seventh to do so with one franchise, and the fifth fastest to do so. During the game, Evans re-aggravated his hamstring and was ruled out for the rest of the game. It was later announced that Evans would likely be out until after the Buccaneers' bye-week.

In Week 12 against the New York Giants, Evans made his return from his hamstring injury, recording five receptions for 68 yards as the team's receiving yards leader for that game. In Week 18, Evans caught a nine-yard pass on the final play of the Buccaneers' regular season campaign, bringing him to 1,004 yards on the season and extending his streak to 11 seasons. He also tied Jerry Rice for the most consecutive 1,000-yard seasons in NFL history. He was ranked 44th by his fellow players on the NFL Top 100 Players of 2025.

==== 2025 season ====
In Week 3 against the New York Jets, Evans suffered a serious hamstring injury. Evans returned four weeks later in Week 7 for a Monday Night Football game against the Detroit Lions, where he would suffer a concussion towards the end of the first quarter, later being ruled out for the remainder of the game. After the game head coach Todd Bowles announced that Evans had a broken clavicle and would miss a majority of the season. He was activated on December 10, ahead of the team's Week 15 matchup against the Atlanta Falcons. He had six receptions for 132 yards in the 29–28 loss to the Falcons. In the 2025 season, he appeared in eight games and had 30 receptions for 368 yards and three touchdowns.

=== San Francisco 49ers ===
On March 12, 2026, Evans signed a three-year deal worth up to $42.4 million with the San Francisco 49ers, ending his 12-year tenure with the Buccaneers.

== Career statistics ==
Legend
	Won the Super Bowl
	Led the league
**Bold**	Career high

=== NFL ===
==== Regular season ====
Year	Team	Games		Receiving					Rushing					Fumbles	
Year	Team	GP	GS	Rec	Yds	Y/R	Lng	TD	Att	Yds	Y/A	Lng	TD	Fum	Lost
2014	TB	15	15	68	1,051	15.5	56T	12	—	—	—	—	—	0	0
2015	TB	15	14	74	1,206	16.3	68	3	—	—	—	—	—	1	**1**
2016	TB	16	16	**96**	1,321	13.8	45T	12	—	—	—	—	—	0	0
2017	TB	15	15	71	1,001	14.1	42T	5	—	—	—	—	—	1	0
2018	TB	16	16	86	**1,524**	**17.7**	72T	8	—	—	—	—	—	**2**	**1**
2019	TB	13	13	67	1,157	17.3	67T	8	—	—	—	—	—	0	0
2020	TB	16	16	70	1,006	14.4	50	13	—	—	—	—	—	0	0
2021	TB	16	16	74	1,035	14.0	46	**14**	**1**	**10**	**10.0**	**10**	**0**	0	0
2022	TB	15	15	77	1,124	14.6	63T	6	—	—	—	—	—	0	0
2023	TB	17	17	79	1,255	15.9	**75T**	13	—	—	—	—	—	0	0
2024	TB	14	14	74	1,004	13.6	57T	11	–	–	–	–	–	0	0
2025	TB	8	8	30	368	12.3	45	3	–	–	–	–	–	0	0
2026	SF	6	6	27	420	15.6	54	3	–	–	–	–	–	0	0
Career		182	181	893	13,472	15.1	75T	111	1	10	10.0	10	0	4	2

==== Postseason ====
Year	Team	Games		Receiving					Fumbles	
Year	Team	GP	GS	Rec	Yds	Y/R	Lng	TD	Fum	Lost
2020	TB	4	4	11	204	**18.5**	35	**2**	0	0
2021	TB	2	2	**17**	**236**	13.9	**55T**	**2**	0	0
2022	TB	1	1	6	74	12.3	20	0	0	0
2023	TB	2	2	11	195	17.7	29	1	0	0
2024	TB	1	1	7	92	13.1	23	1	0	0
Career		10	10	52	801	15.1	55	6	0	0

=== College ===
Year	Team	GP	Receiving		
Year	Team	GP	Rec	Yards	TD
2011	Texas A&M	0	Redshirt		
2012	Texas A&M	13	**82**	1,105	5
2013	Texas A&M	13	69	**1,394**	**12**
Total		26	151	2,499	17

== Career highlights ==
=== Awards and honors ===
NFL

- Super Bowl champion (LV)
- 2× Second-team All-Pro (2016, 2023)
- 6× Pro Bowl (2016, 2018, 2019, 2021, 2023, 2024)
- NFL receiving touchdowns co-leader (2023)
- PFWA All-Rookie Team (2014)
- Bridgestone Performance Play of the Year (2016)
- 9× NFL Top 100 — 75th (2015), 29th (2017), 53rd (2019), 30th (2020), 48th (2021), 53rd (2022), 53rd (2023), 26th (2024), 44th (2025),

College

- Consensus All-American (2013)
- First-team All-SEC (2013)

=== Records ===
==== NFL records ====
- Consecutive seasons of 1,000 yards receiving (tied) – 11
  - Consecutive seasons of 1,000 yards receiving to begin a career – 11
- Youngest player to have 5 seasons of 1,000 receiving yards – (25 years, 95 days)
- Youngest player to have 6 seasons of 1,000 receiving yards – (26 years, 95 days)
- Youngest player with 200 or more yards in a game – (21 years, 87 days)

==== Buccaneers franchise records ====
- Most receiving yards in a season – 1,524 (2018)
- Most receiving touchdowns in a season – 14 (2021)
- Most receiving touchdowns by a rookie in a season – 12 (2014)
- Most receiving yards in a postseason game – 141 (January 21, 2024, vs. Detroit Lions)
- Consecutive games with at least one touchdown reception – 5 (2020)
- Most games of 100 yards receiving in a career – 38 (2014–present)
- Most receiving yards per game in a career – 75.5 (2014–present)
- Most receiving touchdowns in a career – 105 (2014–present)
- Most receiving yards in a career – 12,684 (2014–present)
- Most receptions in a career – 836 (2014–present)
- Most total touchdowns scored in a career – 111 (2014–present)

== Personal life ==
Evans married Ashli Dotson in 2016 after three years of dating. The couple have four children.

Evans' mother gave birth to him when she was 14 years old; she also suffered physical abuse by Evans' father. Evans' maternal uncle, enraged by this, murdered Evans' father when Evans was nine years old. Having experienced domestic violence during his childhood, Evans and his wife Ashli founded the Mike Evans Family Foundation in December 2017 to help victims of domestic violence. His foundation has also hosted free football and basketball camps for children in his hometown of Galveston.
