= Noah Spence =

American football player (born 1994)

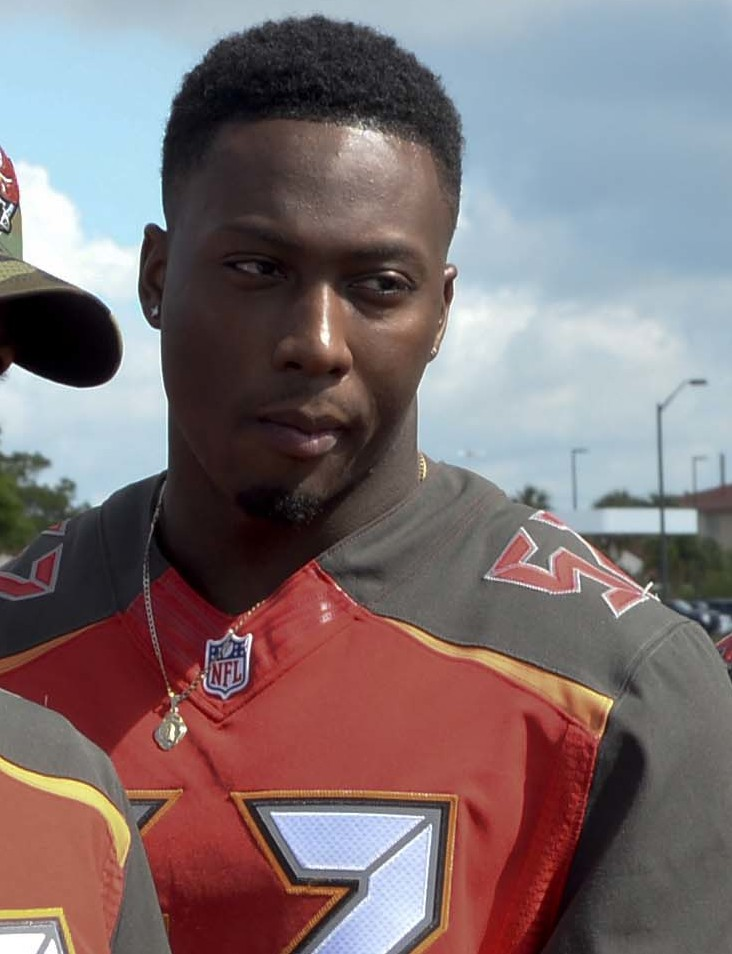
- Spence with the Tampa Bay Buccaneers in 2016

No. 52, 54, 57
- Position: Defensive end

Personal information
- Born: January 8, 1994 (age 32); Philadelphia, Pennsylvania, U.S.
- Listed height: 6 ft 2 in (1.88 m)
- Listed weight: 251 lb (114 kg)

Career information
- High school: Bishop McDevitt (Harrisburg, Pennsylvania)
- College: Ohio State (2012–2014); Eastern Kentucky (2015)
- NFL draft: 2016: 2nd round, 39th overall pick

Career history
- Tampa Bay Buccaneers (2016–2018); Washington Redskins (2019); New Orleans Saints (2019–2020); Cincinnati Bengals (2021)

Awards and highlights
- First-team All-Big Ten (2013)

Career NFL statistics
- Total tackles: 43
- Sacks: 7.5
- Forced fumbles: 4
- Pass deflections: 2
- Stats at Pro Football Reference

Noah Spence (born January 8, 1994) is an American former professional football player who was a defensive end in the National Football League (NFL). He played college football for the Ohio State Buckeyes and Eastern Kentucky Colonels, and was selected by the Tampa Bay Buccaneers in the second round of the 2016 NFL draft.

== Early life ==
Spence attended Bishop McDevitt High School in Harrisburg, Pennsylvania, where he played on the football team. Over his junior and senior seasons, he had 204 tackles and 35.5 sacks. As a senior, he was the Gatorade Football Player of the Year for Pennsylvania. Spence was rated by Rivals.com as a five-star recruit and was the number one weakside defensive end in his class and ninth best player overall. He committed to Ohio State University to play college football.

== College career ==
Spence played in 12 games as a true freshman at Ohio State in 2012 and had 12 tackles and one sack. As a sophomore in 2013, he started 13 games and recorded 50 tackles and eight sacks. On January 1, 2014, he was suspended for three games, which included the 2014 Orange Bowl and the first two games of 2014, after testing positive for MDMA. In September 2014, Spence was suspended indefinitely after another failed drug test. He was ruled permanently ineligible by the Big Ten in November.

Spence transferred to Eastern Kentucky University in 2015. In his lone season at Eastern Kentucky, he had 63 tackles and 11.5 sacks and was the Ohio Valley Conference co-Defensive Player of the Year. After the season, he entered the 2016 NFL draft.

== Professional career ==
Pre-draft measurables
Height	Weight	Arm length	Hand span	40-yard dash	20-yard shuttle	Three-cone drill	Vertical jump	Broad jump	Bench press
6 ft 2 1/2 in (1.89 m)	251 lb (114 kg)	33 in (0.84 m)	10 3/4 in (0.27 m)	4.80 s	4.35 s	7.21 s	35 in (0.89 m)	10 ft 1 in (3.07 m)	25 reps
All values from NFL Combine,

=== Tampa Bay Buccaneers ===
Spence was selected by the Tampa Bay Buccaneers in the second round, 39th overall, in the 2016 NFL Draft. In the month of November, Spence had 2.5 sacks and two forced fumbles earning him Defensive Rookie of the Month.

In 2017, Spence played in six games, recording nine tackles, one sack, and a forced fumble. He was placed on injured reserve on October 25, 2017, with a shoulder injury.

On August 31, 2019, Spence was waived by the Buccaneers.

=== Washington Redskins ===
On September 18, 2019, Spence signed with the Washington Redskins. He was waived by the Redskins on November 19.

=== New Orleans Saints ===
On December 11, 2019, Spence signed with the New Orleans Saints.

On March 23, 2020, Spence re-signed with the Saints. He was placed on the reserve/non-football injury list on May 26, after suffering a torn ACL.

On March 2, 2021, Spence re-signed with the Saints on a one-year contract. He was released by New Orleans on August 17.

=== Cincinnati Bengals ===
On August 22, 2021, Spence signed with the Cincinnati Bengals. He was waived on August 31, and re-signed to the practice squad the next day.

On February 15, 2022, Spence signed a reserve/future contract with Bengals. He was released by Cincinnati on August 30.
