= Cameron Brate =

American football player (born 1991)

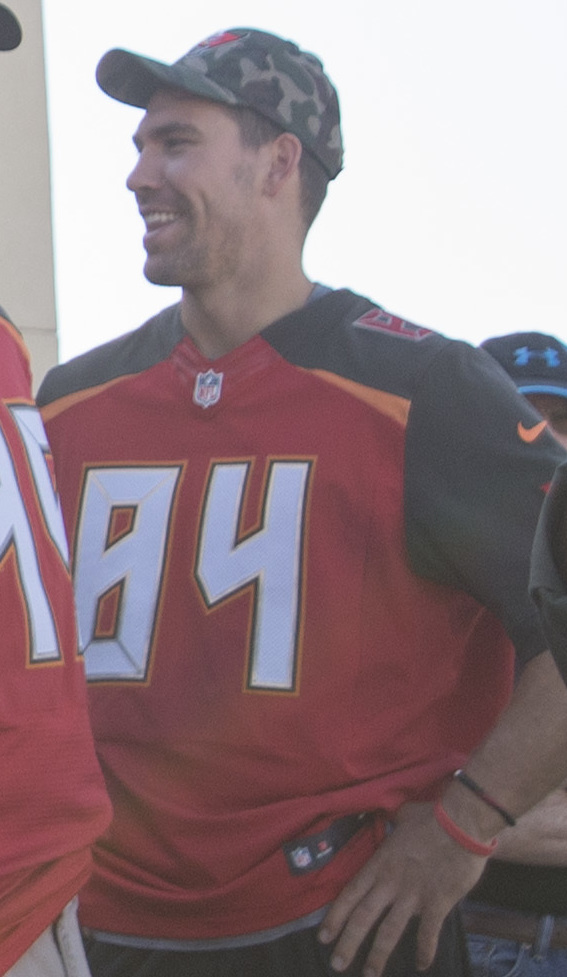
- Brate with the Tampa Bay Buccaneers in 2018

No. 84
- Position: Tight end

Personal information
- Born: July 3, 1991 (age 35); Naperville, Illinois, U.S.
- Listed height: 6 ft 5 in (1.96 m)
- Listed weight: 245 lb (111 kg)

Career information
- High school: Naperville Central
- College: Harvard (2010–2013)
- NFL draft: 2014: undrafted

Career history
- Tampa Bay Buccaneers (2014); New Orleans Saints (2015)*; Tampa Bay Buccaneers (2015–2022)
- * Offseason or practice squad member only

Awards and highlights
- Super Bowl champion (LV)

Career NFL statistics
- Receptions: 273
- Receiving yards: 2,857
- Receiving touchdowns: 33
- Stats at Pro Football Reference

Cameron Brate (born July 3, 1991) is an American former professional football player who was a tight end in the National Football League (NFL). He played college football for the Harvard Crimson.

== Early life ==
Brate grew up in Naperville, Illinois and attended Naperville Central High School, where he played high school football and basketball.

== College career ==
Brate attended and played college football at Harvard University. He redshirted in the 2010 season and contributed to the 2011–2013 seasons.

== Professional career ==
Pre-draft measurables
Height	Weight	Arm length	Hand span	40-yard dash	10-yard split	20-yard split	20-yard shuttle	Three-cone drill	Vertical jump	Broad jump	Bench press
6 ft 5 in (1.96 m)	249 lb (113 kg)	31 3/4 in (0.81 m)	8 7/8 in (0.23 m)	4.77 s	1.67 s	2.72 s	4.48 s	7.16 s	33 1/2 in (0.85 m)	9 ft 9 in (2.97 m)	24 reps
All values from Harvard’s Pro Day

=== Tampa Bay Buccaneers (first stint) ===
==== 2014 ====
On May 21, 2014, the Tampa Bay Buccaneers signed Brate to a three-year, $1.53 million contract that includes a signing bonus of $3,000 as an undrafted free agent.

Throughout training camp, Brate competed for a roster spot as a backup tight end against Ian Thompson. On August 30, 2014, the Tampa Bay Buccaneers waived Brate, but signed him to their practice squad the next day. On November 25, 2014, the Tampa Bay Buccaneers promoted Brate to their active roster. Upon joining the active roster, head coach Lovie Smith named Brate the fifth tight end on the depth chart, behind Austin Seferian-Jenkins, Brandon Myers, Luke Stocker, and D.J. Williams. On November 30, 2014, Brate made his professional regular season debut and earned his first career start and caught a 17-yard pass during a 14–13 loss against the Cincinnati Bengals in Week 13. Brate earned his first career start after Austin Seferian-Jenkins, Luke Stocker, and Brandon Myers all suffered injuries and were unable to play. He finished his rookie season in 2014 with one reception for 17 yards in five games and one start.

==== 2015 ====
Brate entered training camp slated as a backup tight end and competed for a roster spot against Tim Wright and Evan Rodriguez. On September 6, 2015, the Tampa Bay Buccaneers waived Brate as part of their final roster cuts, but signed him to their practice squad two days later. On September 15, 2015, the Tampa Bay Buccaneers officially released Brate from their practice squad.

=== New Orleans Saints ===
On September 16, 2015, the New Orleans Saints signed Brate to their practice squad.

=== Tampa Bay Buccaneers (second stint) ===
==== 2015 ====
On September 22, 2015, the Buccaneers signed Brate from the New Orleans Saints’ practice squad and to their active roster after Austin Seferian-Jenkins suffered a shoulder injury. The Buccaneers signed Brate to a one-year, $510,000 contract. Head coach Lovie Smith named Brate the third tight end on the depth chart, behind Luke Stocker and Brandon Myers.

On November 1, 2015, Brate caught two passes for 48 yards and scored his first career touchdown during a 23–20 win at the Atlanta Falcons in Week 8. Brate caught his first career touchdown reception on a 20-yard pass by Jameis Winston during the second quarter. In Week 12, he caught a season-high five passes for 53 receiving yards and a touchdown during a 25–12 loss at the Indianapolis Colts. He finished the season with 23 receptions for 288 receiving yards and three touchdown receptions in 14 games and four starts.

==== 2016 ====
On January 6, 2016, the Tampa Bay Buccaneers fired head coach Lovie Smith after they finished the previous season with a 6–10 record. On January 15, 2016, the Tampa Bay Buccaneers announced their decision to promote offensive coordinator Dirk Koetter to head coach. Brate entered training camp slated as a backup tight end, but began challenging Austin Seferian-Jenkins for the starting role. Head coach Dirk Koetter named Brate one of the primary starting tight ends to begin the regular season, alongside Luke Stocker.

In Week 10, he made a season-high seven receptions for 84 receiving yards and a touchdown as the Buccaneers defeated the Chicago Bears 36–10. On December 4, 2016, Brate made six catches for a season-high 86 receiving yards and a touchdown during a 28–21 win against the San Diego Chargers. On December 27, 2016, the Tampa Bay Buccaneers placed Brate on injured reserve due to a back injury. He finished the 2016 NFL season with 57 receptions for 660 receiving yards and eight touchdowns in 15 games and ten starts. Among NFL tight ends, Brate converted the highest percentage of red zone targets into touchdowns in 2016.

==== 2017 ====
On February 28, 2017, the Tampa Bay Buccaneers placed a one-year, $690,000 exclusive rights tender in Brate. On April 17, 2017, Brate signed his exclusive rights tender to remain with the Tampa Bay Buccaneers. During training camp, Brate competed to be the primary starting tight end against rookie first round pick O. J. Howard. Head coach Dirk Koetter named Brate the secondary starting tight end to begin the regular season, behind O.J. Howard. On October 1, 2017, Brate caught four passes for a season-high 80 yards and caught a 14-yard pass by Jameis Winston during a 25–23 victory against the New York Giants in Week 4. In Week 6, Brate made a season-high six catches for 76 receiving yards and caught one touchdown reception as the Buccaneers lost 38–33 at the Arizona Cardinals. Brate's Week 6 touchdown reception was throw by quarterback Ryan Fitzpatrick, a fellow graduate of Harvard University; it was reported to be the first Harvard-to-Harvard touchdown in NFL history. Brate finished the season with 48 receptions for 591 receiving yards and six touchdowns in 16 games and five starts.

==== 2018 ====
On March 12, 2018, the Tampa Bay Buccaneers signed Brate to a six-year, $40.8 million contract that includes $18 million guaranteed. Head coach Dirk Koetter retained Brate and O.J. Howard as the starting tight ends to begin the regular season. Overall, Brate finished the 2018 season with 30 receptions for 289 receiving yards and six receiving touchdowns.

==== 2019 ====
In the 2019 season, Brate appeared in all 16 games, of which he started six. In Week 11, against the New Orleans Saints, he had a career-high ten receptions for 73 receiving yards in the 34–17 loss. He finished with 36 receptions for 311 receiving yards and four receiving touchdowns.

==== 2020 ====
In the 2020 regular season, Brate played in all 16 games and recorded 28 receptions for 282 receiving yards and two receiving touchdowns.

In the NFC Championship against the Green Bay Packers, Brate recorded three catches for 19 yards and a touchdown during the 31–26 win. In Super Bowl LV against the Kansas City Chiefs, Brate recorded three catches for 26 yards during the 31–9 win.

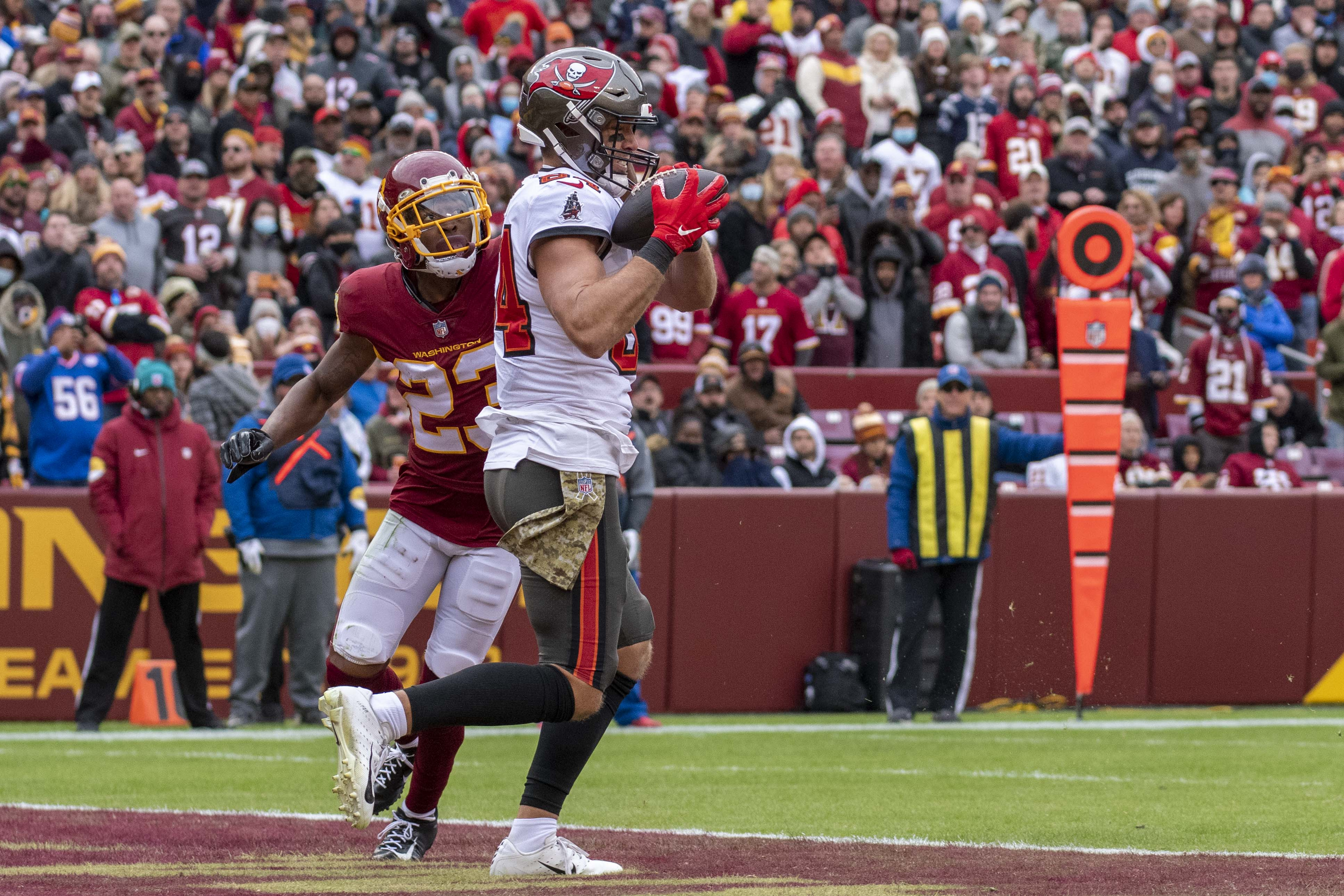
Brate scores a touchdown against the Washington Football Team in 2021.

During the Super Bowl boat parade in Tampa, Brate made one of the most famous catches of his career. Tom Brady threw the Vince Lombardi Trophy from a moving boat in open water to the boat filled with receivers and it was Brate who caught the trophy.

==== 2021 ====
In 2021, Brate caught 30 passes for 245 yards and four receiving touchdowns in 17 games and four starts.

==== 2022 ====
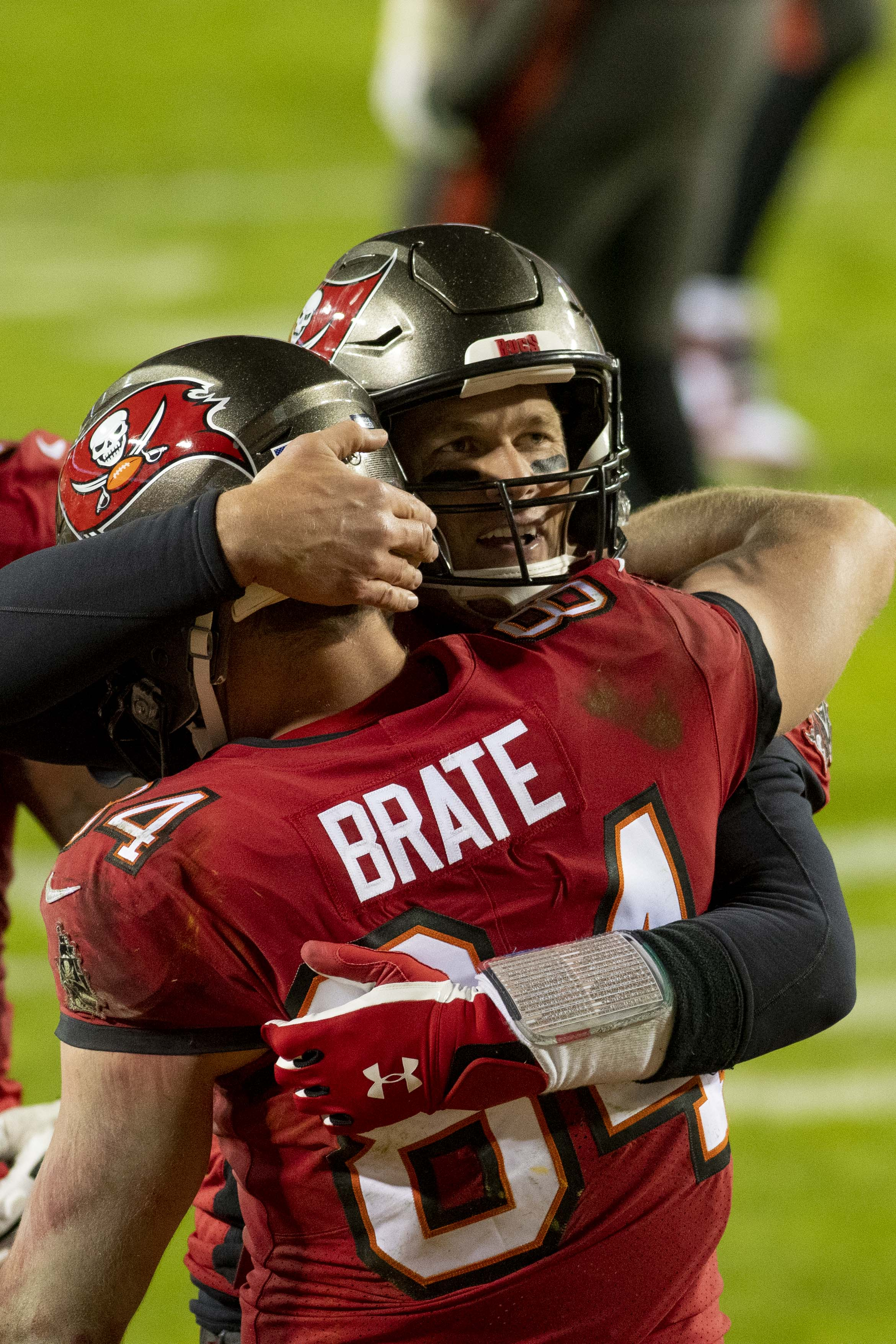
Brate and Tom Brady in Jan. 2021

In Week 6 against the Pittsburgh Steelers, Brate was carted off the field with an injury, and was later diagnosed with a sprained neck on October 20, 2022. He finished the 2022 season with 20 receptions for 174 receiving yards in 11 games and one start.

Brate returned for the playoffs, as he caught one pass for an 8-yard touchdown in the 31-14 loss in the Wild Card Round against the Dallas Cowboys. This would be Brate's last career touchdown, but he would have the honor of catching Tom Brady's last career touchdown pass.

On March 17, 2023, Brate was released by the Buccaneers.

== NFL career statistics ==
Legend
	Won the Super Bowl
**Bold**	Career high

=== Regular season ===
Year	Team	Games		Receiving					Fumbles	
Year	Team	GP	GS	Rec	Yds	Avg	Lng	TD	Fum	Lost
2014	TB	5	1	1	17	**17.0**	17	0	0	0
2015	TB	14	4	23	288	12.5	**46**	3	0	0
2016	TB	15	**10**	**57**	**660**	11.6	38	**8**	**1**	0
2017	TB	16	5	48	591	12.3	35	6	**1**	0
2018	TB	16	2	30	289	9.6	21	6	**1**	**1**
2019	TB	16	6	36	311	8.8	37	4	0	0
2020	TB	16	1	28	282	10.1	25	2	0	0
2021	TB	**17**	3	30	245	8.2	18	4	0	0
2022	TB	11	1	20	174	8.7	21	0	0	0
Total		126	33	273	2,857	10.5	46	33	3	1

=== Postseason ===
Year	Team	Games		Receiving					Fumbles	
Year	Team	GP	GS	Rec	Yds	Y/R	Lng	TD	Fum	Lost
2020	TB	**4**	**1**	**14**	**175**	**12.5**	**24**	**1**	**1**	0
2021	TB	2	**1**	4	38	9.5	16	0	0	0
2022	TB	1	0	1	8	8.0	8	**1**	0	0
Career		7	2	19	221	11.6	24	2	1	0
