= 2018 Tampa Bay Buccaneers season =

NFL team season

- Owner: The Glazer family
- General manager: Jason Licht
- Head coach: Dirk Koetter
- Home stadium: Raymond James Stadium

Results
- Record: 5–11
- Division place: 4th NFC South
- Playoffs: Did not qualify
- Pro Bowlers: WR Mike Evans

Uniform
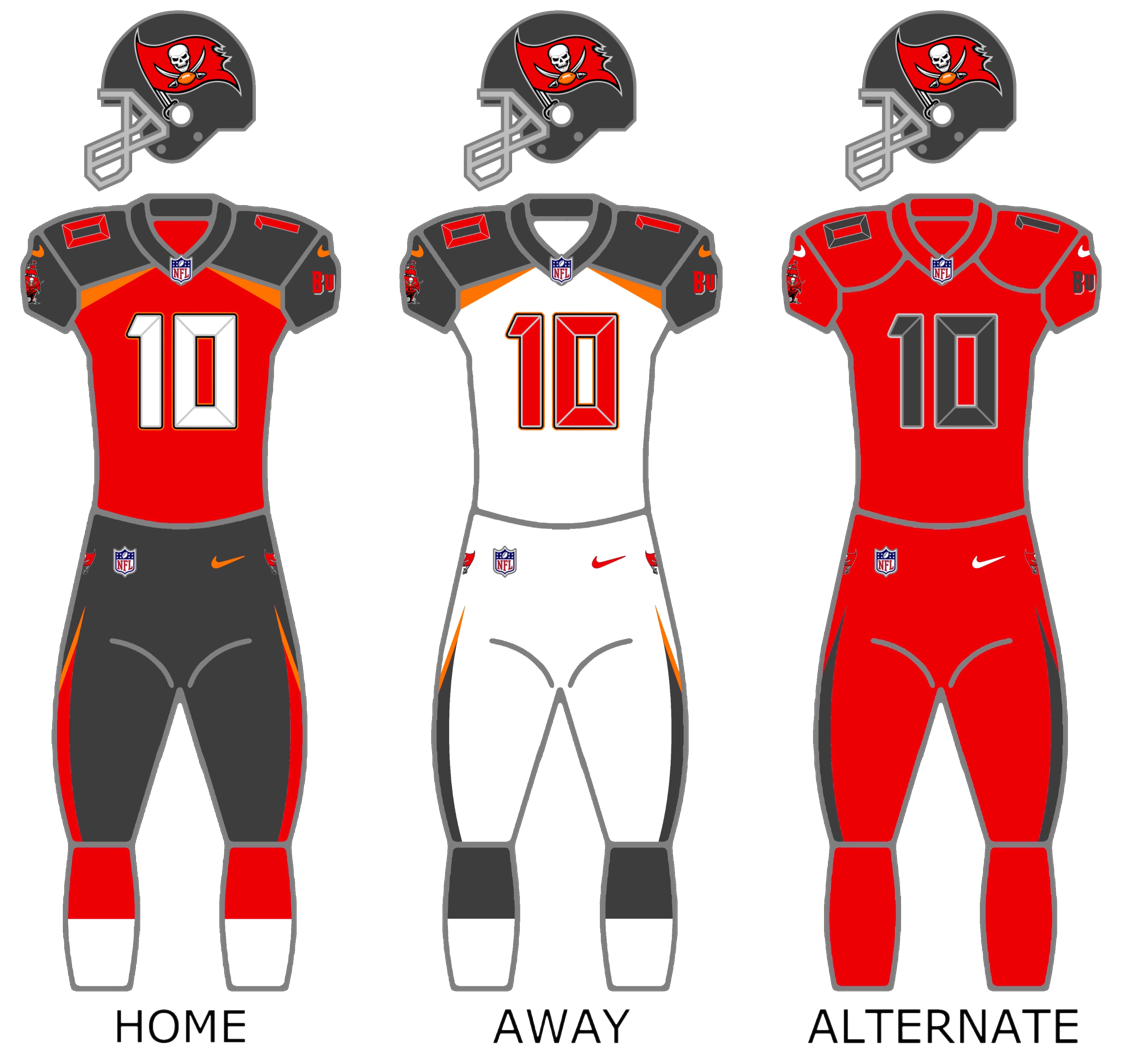

The 2018 season was the Tampa Bay Buccaneers' 43rd in the National Football League (NFL), their fifth under the leadership of general manager Jason Licht, their 21st playing their home games at Raymond James Stadium and their third and final under head coach Dirk Koetter.

During their season opener against the Saints, was the Bucs' first time since Super Bowl XXXVII scoring 48 points in a game, with quarterback Ryan Fitzpatrick having a dominant performance. They would also beat the defending champion Philadelphia Eagles in Week 2 and nearly beat the Pittsburgh Steelers during Week 3, both with Fitzpatrick as starting quarterback. However, despite their 2–0 start, the first time since 2010 the Bucs began a three-game skid with Fitzpatrick being benched for Jameis Winston in Week 4 against the Chicago Bears. Winston started the next three games before being benched in favor for Fitzpatrick against the Cincinnati Bengals. Fitzpatrick went on to start three more games until being benched again for Winston against the New York Giants where Winston would remain the starter for the rest of the season. Despite the Buccaneers leading the league in total passing yards, the team was plagued by poor defensive play, giving up 464 points (29 points per game). As a result, they only managed to match their 5–11 record from the previous season and finished last in the NFC South for the eighth time in ten seasons. After their Week 15 loss to the Baltimore Ravens, the Buccaneers were eliminated from postseason contention for the 11th straight season. Fitzpatrick posted a 2–5 record while starting while Winston posted a 3–6 recording while starting. The team however set a then franchise record 396 points scored on the season.

On December 30, 2018, head coach Dirk Koetter was fired following a Week 17 loss to the Atlanta Falcons. As of the 2024 season, this season remains the Buccaneers' most recent last place finish in the NFC South.

== NFL draft ==
2018 Tampa Bay Buccaneers draft
Round	Pick	Player	Position	College	Notes
1	12	Vita Vea *	DT	Washington	From Cincinnati via Buffalo
2	38	Ronald Jones II	RB	USC	
2	53	M. J. Stewart	CB	UNC	From Buffalo
2	63	Carlton Davis	CB	Auburn	From New England
3	94	Alex Cappa	OT	Humboldt State	From Minnesota
4	117	Jordan Whitehead	S	Pittsburgh	From Detroit via New England
5	144	Justin Watson	WR	Pennsylvania	
6	202	Jack Cichy	LB	Wisconsin	From Pittsburgh via Cleveland and Pittsburgh
Made roster † Pro Football Hall of Fame * Made at least one Pro Bowl during career

Draft trades

- The Buccaneers traded their third- and fourth-round selections (69th and 108th overall) to the New York Giants in exchange for the Giants' fourth-round selection (102nd overall) and defensive end Jason Pierre-Paul.
- The Buccaneers traded a seventh-round selection in 2019 and free safety J. J. Wilcox to Pittsburgh in exchange for Pittsburgh's sixth-round selection (202nd overall).
- The Buccaneers traded their seventh-round selection (223rd overall) and their seventh-round selection in 2017 (237th overall) to Miami in exchange for Miami's seventh-round selection in 2017 (223rd overall).
- The Buccaneers were awarded a seventh-round compensatory pick (255th overall).
- The Buccaneers traded their first- and seventh-round selections (7th and 255th overall) to the Buffalo Bills in exchange for the Bills' first- and second-round selections (12th, 53rd, and 56th overall).
- The Buccaneers traded their second-round selection (56th overall) to the New England Patriots in exchange for the Patriots' second- and fourth-round selections (63rd and 117th overall).
- The Buccaneers traded their fourth- and sixth-round selections (102nd and 180th overall) to the Minnesota Vikings in exchange for the Vikings' third round selection (94th overall).

== Staff ==
2018 Tampa Bay Buccaneers staff
Front office: Owner/president – Estate of Malcolm Glazer; Co-chairman – Bryan Glazer; Co-chairman – Edward Glazer; Co-chairman – Joel Glazer; General manager – Jason Licht; Director of player personnel – John Spytek; Director of football operations – Shelton Quarles; Director of college scouting – Mike Biehl; Director of pro scouting – Rob McCartney; Director of football administration – Mike Greenberg; Head coaches: Head coach – Dirk Koetter; Assistant to the head coach – Anthony Perkins; Offensive coaches: Offensive coordinator – Todd Monken; Quarterbacks – Mike Bajakian; Running backs – Tim Spencer; Wide receivers – Skyler Fulton; Assistant wide receivers/game management – Andrew Weidinger; Tight ends – Ben Steele; Offensive line – George Warhop; Assistant offensive line – Butch Barry; Offensive quality control – Zack Grossi	Defensive coaches: Interim defensive coordinator/linebackers – Mark Duffner; Defensive line – Brentson Buckner; Assistant defensive line – Paul Spicer; Defensive backs – Brett Maxie; Secondary – Jon Hoke; Defensive assistant – Danny Breyer; Defensive quality control – Stephen Nicholas; Special teams coaches: Special teams coordinator – Nate Kaczor; Assistant special teams – Carlos Polk; Strength and conditioning: Head strength and conditioning – Dave Kennedy; Assistant strength and conditioning – Joe Vaughn; Assistant strength and conditioning – Chad Wade

== Final roster ==
2018 Tampa Bay Buccaneers roster
Quarterbacks (QB): 14 Ryan Fitzpatrick; 4 Ryan Griffin; 3 Jameis Winston; Running backs (RB): 25 Peyton Barber; 27 Ronald Jones; 32 Jacquizz Rodgers; Wide receivers (WR): 13 Mike Evans; 12 Chris Godwin; 10 Adam Humphries; 11 DeSean Jackson; 17 Justin Watson; 85 Bobo Wilson; Tight ends (TE): 82 Antony Auclair; 84 Cameron Brate; 86 Donnie Ernsberger; 88 Tanner Hudson	Offensive linemen (OL): 77 Caleb Benenoch G; 65 Alex Cappa G; 69 Demar Dotson T; 66 Ryan Jensen C; 67 Michael Liedtke T; 74 Ali Marpet G; 76 Donovan Smith T; 61 Leonard Wester T; Defensive linemen (DL): 91 Beau Allen DT; 97 Vinny Curry DE; 92 William Gholston DT; 78 Jeremiah Ledbetter DT; 93 Gerald McCoy DT; 94 Carl Nassib DE; 56 Rakeem Nuñez-Roches DT; 90 Jason Pierre-Paul DE; 57 Noah Spence DE; 50 Vita Vea DT	Linebackers (LB): 59 Devante Bond OLB; 49 Riley Bullough MLB; 54 Lavonte David OLB; 52 Cameron Lynch OLB; 53 Adarius Taylor MLB; Defensive backs (DB): 26 Andrew Adams FS; 33 Carlton Davis CB; 35 Javien Elliott CB; 24 Brent Grimes CB; 22 De'Vante Harris CB; 39 Isaiah Johnson FS; 37 David Rivers CB; 30 Josh Shaw CB; 29 Ryan Smith CB; 36 M. J. Stewart CB; 31 Jordan Whitehead SS; Special teams (ST): 9 Bryan Anger P; 89 Garrison Sanborn LS; 5 Cairo Santos K	Practice squad: 64 Cole Boozer T; 15 K. J. Brent WR; 71 Demone Harris DE; 70 Ruben Holcomb G; 95 Farrington Huguenin OLB; 75 Alec James DE; 46 Eric Nzeocha OLB (IPP); 79 Pat O'Connor DE; 44 Dare Ogunbowale RB; 18 Bernard Reedy WR; 43 Emmanuel Smith MLB; Reserve: 58 Kwon Alexander MLB (IR); 83 Sergio Bailey WR (IR); 51 Kendell Beckwith OLB (NF-Inj.); 48 Jack Cichy OLB (IR); 23 Chris Conte SS (IR); 45 Alan Cross FB (IR); 21 Justin Evans FS (IR); 28 Vernon Hargreaves CB (IR); 80 O. J. Howard TE (IR); 41 Kevin Minter MLB (IR); 62 Evan Smith C/G (IR); 96 Stevie Tu'ikolovatu DT (IR); 98 Mitch Unrein DT (IR); 38 Shaun Wilson RB (IR); Rookies in italics 53 active, 14 reserve, 11 practice squad

== Preseason ==
Week	Date	Opponent	Result	Record	Venue	Recap
1	August 9	at Miami Dolphins	W 26–24	1–0	Hard Rock Stadium	Recap
2	August 18	at Tennessee Titans	W 30–14	2–0	Nissan Stadium	Recap
3	August 24	Detroit Lions	L 30–33	2–1	Raymond James Stadium	Recap
4	August 30	Jacksonville Jaguars	L 10–25	2–2	Raymond James Stadium	Recap

== Regular season ==
=== Schedule ===
Week	Date	Opponent	Result	Record	Venue	Recap
1	September 9	at **New Orleans Saints**	**W** 48–40	1–0	Mercedes-Benz Superdome	Recap
2	September 16	Philadelphia Eagles	**W** 27–21	2–0	Raymond James Stadium	Recap
3	September 24	Pittsburgh Steelers	**L** 27–30	2–1	Raymond James Stadium	Recap
4	September 30	at Chicago Bears	**L** 10–48	2–2	Soldier Field	Recap
5	Bye					
6	October 14	at **Atlanta Falcons**	**L** 29–34	2–3	Mercedes-Benz Stadium	Recap
7	October 21	Cleveland Browns	**W** 26–23 (OT)	3–3	Raymond James Stadium	Recap
8	October 28	at Cincinnati Bengals	**L** 34–37	3–4	Paul Brown Stadium	Recap
9	November 4	at **Carolina Panthers**	**L** 28–42	3–5	Bank of America Stadium	Recap
10	November 11	Washington Redskins	**L** 3–16	3–6	Raymond James Stadium	Recap
11	November 18	at New York Giants	**L** 35–38	3–7	MetLife Stadium	Recap
12	November 25	San Francisco 49ers	**W** 27–9	4–7	Raymond James Stadium	Recap
13	December 2	**Carolina Panthers**	**W** 24–17	5–7	Raymond James Stadium	Recap
14	December 9	**New Orleans Saints**	**L** 14–28	5–8	Raymond James Stadium	Recap
15	December 16	at Baltimore Ravens	**L** 12–20	5–9	M&T Bank Stadium	Recap
16	December 23	at Dallas Cowboys	**L** 20–27	5–10	AT&T Stadium	Recap
17	December 30	**Atlanta Falcons**	**L** 32–34	5–11	Raymond James Stadium	Recap

Note: Intra-division opponents are in bold text.

=== Game summaries ===
==== Week 1: at New Orleans Saints ====
Week One: Tampa Bay Buccaneers at New Orleans Saints – Game summary

Quarter	1	2	3	4	Total
**Buccaneers**	14	17	10	7	**48**
Saints	10	14	0	16	**40**

at Mercedes-Benz Superdome, New Orleans, Louisiana

- Date: September 9
- Game time: 1:00 p.m. EDT/12:00 p.m. CDT
- Game weather: Played indoors (dome stadium)
- Game attendance: 73,038
- Referee: John Parry
- TV announcers (Fox): Chris Myers, Daryl Johnston and Laura Okmin
- Recap, Gamebook

Game information

First quarter

- NO – Alvin Kamara 5-yard run (Lutz kick) Saints 7–0 **Drive 6 plays, 71 yards, 3:19.**
- TB – DeSean Jackson 58-yard pass from Ryan Fitzpatrick (Catanzaro kick) Tied 7–7 **Drive 4 plays, 58 yards, 2:00.**
- NO – Wil Lutz 36-yard field goal Saints 10–7 **Drive 11 plays, 58 yards, 5:16.**
- TB – Ryan Fitzpatrick 3-yard run (Catanzaro kick) Buccaneers 14–10 **Drive 6 plays, 75 yards, 2:27.**

Second quarter

- NO – Ted Ginn 28-yard pass from Drew Brees (Lutz kick) Saints 17–14 **Drive 4 plays, 74 yards, 2:04.**
- TB – Chandler Catanzaro 33-yard field goal Tied 17–17 **Drive 8 plays, 60 yards, 3:42.**
- TB – Chris Godwin 9-yard pass from Ryan Fitzpatrick (Catanzaro kick) Buccaneers 24–17 **Drive 10 plays, 78 yards, 5:00.**
- TB – Justin Evans 34-yard fumble return (Catanzaro kick) Buccaneers 31–17
- NO – Michael Thomas 6-yard pass from Drew Brees (Lutz kick) Buccaneers 31–24 **Drive 9 plays, 75 yards, 3:32.**

Third quarter

- TB – Chandler Catanzaro 36-yard field goal Buccaneers 34–24 **Drive 9 plays, 57 yards, 3:36.**
- TB – Mike Evans 50-yard pass from Ryan Fitzpatrick (Catanzaro kick) Buccaneers 41–24 **Drive 4 plays, 74 yards, 2:10.**

Fourth quarter

- TB – DeSean Jackson 36-yard pass from Ryan Fitzpatrick (Catanzaro kick) Buccaneers 48–24 **Drive 6 plays, 65 yards, 3:07.**
- NO – Alvin Kamara 1-yard run (Kamara run) Buccaneers 48–32 **Drive 10 plays, 75 yards, 3:25.**
- NO – Alvin Kamara 7-yard pass from Drew Brees (Ginn pass from Brees) Buccaneers 48–40 **Drive 5 plays, 66 yards, 1:21.**

Top passers

- TB – Ryan Fitzpatrick – 21/28, 417 yards, 4 TD
- NO – Drew Brees – 37/45, 439 yards, 3 TD

Top rushers

- TB – Peyton Barber – 19 carries, 69 yards
- NO – Alvin Kamara – 9 carries, 29 yards, 2 TD

Top receivers

- TB – Mike Evans – 7 receptions, 147 yards, 1 TD
- NO – Michael Thomas – 16 receptions, 180 yards, 1 TD

Tampa Bay started the 2018 season with Jameis Winston serving a three-game suspension for violating the league's personal conduct policy. Ryan Fitzpatrick started as quarterback and led the Buccaneers to a 48–40 victory over division rival New Orleans. The 48 points scored tied a franchise record for most points scored in a game, with the Bucs also scoring 48 points in Super Bowl XXXVII. Also, the combined score of 88 points from both teams set an NFL record for the most points scored in Week 1. Fitzpatrick threw for 417 yards and 4 touchdown passes, and ran for another touchdown. The scoring frenzy started early after the Saints scored a touchdown on their first drive. The Buccaneers answered with a 58-yard touchdown reception by DeSean Jackson, followed by a 3-yard touchdown run by Fitzpatrick, for a 14–10 lead at the end of the first quarter. In the third quarter, Mike Evans caught a 50-yard touchdown, the second touchdown pass of 50 or more yards. The Buccaneers tied a franchise record with 48 points, and set a team record with 31 first half points. With under five minutes to go, Chandler Catanzaro missed a 44-yard field goal which would have broken the team record outright. Trailing 48–24, the Saints attempted a rally in the fourth quarter. Drew Brees led the Saints on two touchdown drives, and trimmed the deficit to 8 points with just over three minutes remaining. Facing a 3rd down & 11 at their own 24-yard line, Ryan Fitzpatrick scrambled 12 yards for a Buccaneers first down at the two-minute warning. The victory was secure as the Saints had no more time outs, and the Buccaneers took a knee three times to run out the clock. This was the Bucs last win against the Saints in the regular season until week 2 of the 2022 season

==== Week 2: vs. Philadelphia Eagles ====
Week Two: Philadelphia Eagles at Tampa Bay Buccaneers – Game summary

Quarter	1	2	3	4	Total
Eagles	0	7	7	7	**21**
**Buccaneers**	7	13	7	0	**27**

at Raymond James Stadium, Tampa, Florida

- Date: September 16
- Game time: 1:00 pm. EDT
- Game weather: 91 °F (33 °C), cloudy
- Game attendance: 56,552
- Referee: Alex Kemp
- TV announcers (Fox): Kenny Albert, Ronde Barber and Tiki Barber
- Recap, Gamebook

Game information

**First quarter**

- TB – DeSean Jackson 75-yard pass from Ryan Fitzpatrick (Chandler Catanzaro kick), 14:49. Buccaneers 7–0. **Drive: 1 plays, 75 yards, 0:11.**

**Second quarter**

- PHI – Corey Clement 15-yard run (Jake Elliott kick), 4:51. Tied 7–7. **Drive: 13 plays, 78 yards, 6:09.**
- TB – O. J. Howard 75-yard pass from Ryan Fitzpatrick (kick failed), 4:39. Buccaneers 13–7. **Drive: 1 plays, 75 yards, 0:12.**
- TB – Chris Godwin 8-yard pass from Ryan Fitzpatrick (Chandler Catanzaro kick), 0:42. Buccaneers 20–7. **Drive: 6 plays, 70 yards, 1:44.**

**Third quarter**

- TB – Mike Evans 4-yard pass from Ryan Fitzpatrick (Chandler Catanzaro kick), 9:19. Buccaneers 27–7. **Drive: 7 plays, 54 yards, 3:17.**
- PHI – Jay Ajayi 2-yard run (Jake Elliott kick), 0:09. Buccaneers 27–14. **Drive: 9 plays, 84 yards, 3:42.**

**Fourth quarter**

- PHI – Nelson Agholor 2-yard pass from Nick Foles (Jake Elliott kick), 2:46. Buccaneers 27–21. **Drive: 8 plays, 78 yards, 3:50.**

**Top passers**

- PHI – Nick Foles – 35/48, 334 yards, 1 TD
- TB – Ryan Fitzpatrick – 27/33, 402 yards, 4 TD, 1 INT

**Top rushers**

- PHI – Corey Clement – 6 carries, 30 yards, 1 TD
- TB – Peyton Barber – 16 carries, 22 yards

**Top receivers**

- PHI – Zach Ertz – 11 receptions, 94 yards
- TB – Mike Evans – 10 receptions, 83 yards, 1 TD

Tampa Bay won their second straight game, starting the season 2–0 for the first time since 2010. Quarterback Ryan Fitzpatrick threw for 402 yards and 4 touchdown passes, the first player in NFL history to throw for 400 yards and four touchdown passes in the first two weeks of the season. The game started out with a bang as Fitzpatrick threw a 75-yard touchdown pass to DeSean Jackson on the first play of the game. Second-year tight end O. J. Howard also scored on a 75-yard touchdown pass later in the first half. The Buccaneers largest lead was 27–7 midway through the third quarter. The Eagles scored two touchdowns in the second half to make it a one-score game, but they were not able to score again. The Buccaneers ran the clock down to 19 seconds, giving the Eagles time to run only three plays. With three seconds left in regulation, a Nick Foles pass followed by series of desperation laterals ran out the clock, securing the win for Tampa Bay. With Atlanta defeating Carolina, the Buccaneers lead the NFC South, and remain the only team in the division with an undefeated record.

==== Week 3: vs. Pittsburgh Steelers ====
Week Three: Pittsburgh Steelers at Tampa Bay Buccaneers – Game summary

Quarter	1	2	3	4	Total
**Steelers**	6	24	0	0	**30**
Buccaneers	7	3	3	14	**27**

at Raymond James Stadium, Tampa, Florida

- Date: September 24
- Game time: 8:15 pm. EDT
- Game weather: 77 °F (25 °C), cloudy
- Game attendance: 62,571
- Referee: Pete Morelli
- TV announcers (ESPN/WMOR): Joe Tessitore, Jason Witten, Booger McFarland and Lisa Salters
- Recap, Gamebook

Game information

**First quarter**

- TB – Cameron Brate – 4-yard TD pass from Ryan Fitzpatrick, 7:21. (Chandler Catanzaro kick). Buccaneers 7–0. **Drive: 5 plays, 53 yards, 2:34.**
- PIT – Vance McDonald – 75-yard TD pass from Ben Roethlisberger, 5:48. Buccaneers 7–6. **Drive: 3 plays, 75 yards, 1:33.**

**Second quarter**

- PIT – Chris Boswell – 38-yard field goal, 12:14. Steelers 9–7. **Drive: 9 plays, 72 yards, 4:45.**
- PIT – Antonio Brown – 27-yard TD pass from Ben Roethlisberger, 10:33. (Chris Boswell kick). Steelers 16–7. **Drive: 2 plays, 33 yards, 0:47.**
- PIT – Bud Dupree – 10-yard INT return, 2:50. Steelers 23–7. **Drive: 2 plays, 0 yards, 0:47.**
- TB – Chandler Catanzaro – 21-yard field goal, 1:15. Steelers 23–10. **Drive: 6 plays, 75 yards, 1:35.**
- PIT – Ryan Switzer – 1 yard TD pass from Ben Roethlisberger, 0:06. Steelers 30–10. **Drive: 9 plays, 75 yards, 1:09.**

**Third quarter**

- TB – Chandler Catanzaro – 28-yard field goal, 7:07. Steelers 30–13. **Drive: 14 plays, 65 yards, 7:53.**

**Fourth quarter**

- TB – Chris Godwin – 4-yard TD pass from Ryan Fitzpatrick (Chandler Catanzaro kick), 11:06. Steelers 30–20. **Drive: 12 plays, 63 yards, 5:00.**
- TB – Mike Evans – 24-yard TD pass from Ryan Fitzpatrick (Chandler Catanzaro kick), 5:43. Steelers 30–27. **Drive: 9 plays, 92 yards, 2:57.**

**Top passers**

- PIT – Ben Roethlisberger – 30/38, 353 yards, 3 TD, 1 INT
- TB – Ryan Fitzpatrick – 30/50, 411 yards, 3 TD, 3 INT

**Top rushers**

- PIT – James Conner – 15 carries, 61 yards
- TB – Peyton Barber – 8 carries, 33 yards

**Top receivers**

- PIT – JuJu Smith-Schuster – 9 receptions, 116 yards
- TB – Mike Evans – 6 receptions, 137 yards, 1 TD

In the final game before Jameis Winston could return from suspension, Tampa Bay lost their first game of the season in their only scheduled primetime game. Ryan Fitzpatrick threw three interceptions in the first half, one returned for a touchdown, as the Buccaneers went into halftime trailing 30–10. In the second half, Fitzpatrick lead a comeback throwing two touchdown passes, and Buccaneers closed to within three points late in the fourth quarter. However, the defense could not stop the Steelers offense and the clock ran out. Fitzpatrick finished the game with 411 yards, three touchdowns and three interceptions, becoming the first quarterback in NFL history to throw for over 400 yards in three consecutive games. With this loss, the Buccaneers fell to 2–1 but still remained atop the NFC South. The Bucs failed to start the season 3–0. The last time they had done so was the 2005 season.

==== Week 4: at Chicago Bears ====
Week Four: Tampa Bay Buccaneers at Chicago Bears – Game summary

Quarter	1	2	3	4	Total
Buccaneers	0	3	0	7	**10**
**Bears**	14	24	7	3	**48**

at Soldier Field, Chicago, Illinois

- Date: September 30
- Game time: 1:00 pm. EDT/12:00 pm. CDT
- Game weather: 66 °F (19 °C), cloudy
- Game attendance: 61,893
- Referee: Jerome Boger
- TV announcers (Fox): Thom Brennaman, Chris Spielman and Shannon Spake
- Recap, Gamebook

Game information

**First quarter**

- CHI – Trey Burton 39-yard pass from Mitchell Trubisky (Cody Parkey kick), 12:27. Bears 7–0. **Drive: 6 plays, 75 yards, 2:40.**
- CHI – Allen Robinson 14-yard pass from Mitchell Trubisky (Cody Parkey kick), 2:18. Bears 14–0. **Drive: 7 plays, 73 yards, 3:34.**

**Second quarter**

- TB – Chandler Catanzaro 30-yard field goal, 15:00. Bears 14–3. **Drive: 6 plays, 60 yards, 2:16.**
- CHI – Tarik Cohen 9-yard pass from Mitchell Trubisky (Cody Parkey kick), 12:26. Bears 21–3. **Drive: 4 plays, 77 yards, 2:34.**
- CHI – Josh Bellamy 20-yard pass from Mitchell Trubisky (Cody Parkey kick), 9:05. Bears 28–3. **Drive: 4 plays, 73 yards, 1:46.**
- CHI – Taylor Gabriel 3-yard pass from Mitchell Trubisky (Cody Parkey kick), 5:00. Bears 35–3. **Drive: 6 plays, 70 yards, 3:12.**
- CHI – Cody Parkey 50-yard field goal, 0:03. Bears 38–3. **Drive: 10 plays, 59 yards, 2:17.**

**Third quarter**

- CHI – Taylor Gabriel 3-yard pass from Mitchell Trubisky (Cody Parkey kick), 10:32. Bears 45–3. **Drive: 4 plays, 60 yards, 0:37.**

**Fourth quarter**

- TB – Cameron Brate 16-yard pass from Jameis Winston (Chandler Catanzaro kick), 13:36. Bears 45–10. **Drive: 11 plays, 79 yards, 5:34.**
- CHI – Cody Parkey 46-yard field goal, 6:28. Bears 48–10. **Drive: 11 plays, 47 yards, 7:07.**

**Top passers**

- TB – Jameis Winston – 16/20, 145 yards, TD, 2 INT
- CHI – Mitchell Trubisky – 19/26, 354 yards, 6 TD

**Top rushers**

- TB – Ronald Jones – 10 rushes, 29 yards
- CHI – Tarik Cohen – 13 rushes, 53 yards

**Top receivers**

- TB – DeSean Jackson – 5 receptions, 112 yards
- CHI – Tarik Cohen – 7 receptions, 121 yards, TD

Chicago routed Tampa Bay by the score of 48–10. Bears quarterback Mitchell Trubisky threw a franchise record-tying six touchdown passes, five in the first half alone, as Chicago jumped out to a 38–3 halftime lead. After completing only nine passes in the first half, Ryan Fitzpatrick was benched at halftime. Jameis Winston, fresh off his three-game suspension, came in to quarterback the second half. Winston salvaged the day with 16 completions for 145 yards, one touchdown pass, but two interceptions.

==== Week 6: at Atlanta Falcons ====
Week Six: Tampa Bay Buccaneers at Atlanta Falcons – Game summary

Quarter	1	2	3	4	Total
Buccaneers	6	7	3	13	**29**
**Falcons**	7	17	0	10	**34**

at Mercedes-Benz Stadium, Atlanta, Georgia

- Date: October 14
- Game time: 1:00 pm. EDT
- Game weather: 67 °F (19 °C), clear – retractable roof open
- Game attendance: 72,665
- Referee: Walt Coleman
- TV announcers (Fox): Thom Brennaman, Chris Spielman and Shannon Spake
- Recap, Gamebook

Game information

First quarter

- TB – Cameron Brate 15-yard pass from Jameis Winston (kick failed), 11:36. Buccaneers 6–0. **Drive: 8 plays, 75 yards, 3:24.**

Second quarter

- ATL – Mohamed Sanu 35-yard pass from Matt Ryan (Matt Bryant kick), 8:22. Falcons 7–6. **Drive: 6 plays, 75 yards, 3:14.**
- ATL – Ito Smith 14-yard run (Matt Bryant kick), 12:19. Falcons 14–6. **Drive: 14 plays, 86 yards, 7:23.**
- ATL – Austin Hooper 9-yard pass from Matt Ryan (Matt Bryant kick), 7:30. Falcons 21–6. **Drive: 7 plays, 58 yards, 3:13.**
- TB – O. J. Howard 10-yard pass from Jameis Winston (Chandler Catanzaro kick), 0:26. Falcons 21–13. **Drive: 7 plays, 52 yards, 2:55.**
- ATL – Matt Bryant 45-yard field goal, 0:01. Falcons 24–13. **Drive: 4 plays, 48 yards, 0:25.**

Third quarter

- TB – Chandler Catanzaro 35-yard field goal, 2:39. Falcons 24–16. **Drive: 7 plays, 43 yards, 4:08.**

Fourth quarter

- TB – Chris Godwin 9-yard pass from Jameis Winston (pass failed), 11:34. Falcons 24–22. **Drive: 7 plays, 85 yards, 3:45.**
- ATL – Tevin Coleman 6-yard pass from Matt Ryan (Matt Bryant kick), 6:28. Falcons 31–22. **Drive: 10 plays, 75 yards, 5:06.**
- TB – Peyton Barber 5-yard pass from Jameis Winston (Chandler Catanzaro kick), 3:47. Falcons 31–29. **Drive: 9 plays, 75 yards, 2:41.**

**Top passers**

- TB – Jameis Winston – 30/41, 395 yards, 4 TD, 2 INT
- ATL – Matt Ryan – 31/41, 355 yards, 3 TD

**Top rushers**

- TB – Peyton Barber – 13 carries, 82 yards
- ATL – Tevin Coleman – 10 carries, 35 yards

**Top receivers**

- TB – Chris Godwin – 6 receptions, 56 yards, 1 TD
- ATL – Julio Jones – 10 receptions, 144 yards

Following this defeat, the Bucs elevated Bucs’ linebackers coach Mark Duffner to defensive coordinator on Monday, replacing Mike Smith.

==== Week 7: vs. Cleveland Browns ====
Week Seven: Cleveland Browns at Tampa Bay Buccaneers – Game summary

Quarter	1	2	3	4	OT	Total
Browns	2	0	7	14	0	**23**
**Buccaneers**	3	13	7	0	3	**26**

at Raymond James Stadium, Tampa, Florida

- Date: October 21
- Game time: 1:00 pm. EDT
- Game weather: 79 °F (26 °C), clear
- Game attendance: 53,682
- Referee: Shawn Hochuli
- TV announcers (Fox): Sam Rosen, Ronde Barber and Shane Bacon
- Recap, Gamebook

Game information

**First quarter**

- CLE – Safety, Trevon Coley tackled Peyton Barber in the end zone, 9:22. Browns 2–0.
- TB – Chandler Catanzaro 38-yard field goal, 3:04. Buccaneers 3–2. **Drive: 11 plays, 52 yards, 4:26.**

**Second quarter**

- TB – DeSean Jackson 14-yard run, (PAT failed), 15:00. Buccaneers 9–2. **Drive: 6 plays, 55 yards, 1:44.**
- TB – Jameis Winston 14-yard run, (Chandler Catanzaro kick), 8:05. Buccaneers 16–2. **Drive: 10 plays, 76 yards, 5:22.**

**Third quarter**

- CLE – David Njoku 15-yard pass from Baker Mayfield, (Greg Joseph kick), 13:08. Buccaneers 16–9. **Drive: 3 plays, 26 yards, 1:22.**
- TB – Ronald Jones 2-yard run, (Chandler Catanzaro kick), 0:32. Buccaneers 23–9. **Drive: 13 plays, 73 yards, 6:30.**

**Fourth quarter**

- CLE – Nick Chubb 1-yard run, (Greg Joseph kick), 12:25. Buccaneers 23–16. **Drive: 7 plays, 51 yards, 3:11.**
- CLE – Jarvis Landry 16-yard pass from Baker Mayfield, (Greg Joseph kick), 2:36. Tied 23–23. **Drive: 1 play, 16 yards, 0:08.**

**Overtime**

- TB – Chandler Catanzaro 59-yard field goal, 1:55. Buccaneers 26–23. **Drive: 6 plays, 2 yards, 1:22.**

**Top passers**

- CLE – Baker Mayfield – 23/34, 215 yards, 2 TD
- TB – Jameis Winston – 32/52, 365 yards, 2 INT

**Top rushers**

- CLE – Nick Chubb – 18 carries, 80 yards, TD
- TB – Jameis Winston – 10 carries, 55 yards, TD

**Top receivers**

- CLE – Jarvis Landry – 10 receptions, 97 yards, TD
- TB – Mike Evans – 7 receptions, 107 yards

At the end of the third quarter, the Bucs lead 23–9. However, the Browns scored two fourth quarter touchdowns to tie the game at 23. On the final play of regulation, Bucs kicker Chandler Catanzaro missed a 40-yard field goal to take the game into overtime. With under 2 minutes left in OT, Catanzaro came out for another game-winning field goal attempt, this time from 59 yards. The kick was good, giving the Bucs the win and ending their 3-game losing streak. With the win, the Bucs move back to .500 at 3–3 and remain 3rd in the NFC South.

==== Week 8: at Cincinnati Bengals ====
Week Eight: Tampa Bay Buccaneers at Cincinnati Bengals – Game summary

Quarter	1	2	3	4	Total
Buccaneers	0	9	7	18	**34**
**Bengals**	7	20	7	3	**37**

at Paul Brown Stadium, Cincinnati, Ohio

- Date: October 28
- Game time: 1:00 pm. EDT
- Game weather: 55 °F (13 °C), cloudy
- Game attendance: 45,134
- Referee: Alex Kemp
- TV announcers (Fox): Chris Myers, Daryl Johnston and Laura Okmin
- Recap, Gamebook

Game information

**First quarter**

- CIN – Joe Mixon 1-yard run (Randy Bullock kick), 3:04. Bengals 7–0. **Drive: 4 plays, 63 yards, 1:22.**

**Second quarter**

- CIN – Tyler Boyd 9-yard pass from Andy Dalton (Randy Bullock kick), 10:04. Bengals 14–0. **Drive: 12 plays, 58 yards, 4:57.**
- CIN – Joe Mixon 8-yard run (Randy Bullock kick), 5:07. Bengals 21–0. **Drive: 4 plays, 68 yards, 1:31.**
- TB – DeSean Jackson 60-yard pass from Jameis Winston (kick failed), 4:36. Bengals 21–6. **Drive: 2 plays, 75 yards, 0:31.**
- CIN – A. J. Green 17-yard pass from Andy Dalton (kick failed), 2:34. Bengals 27–6. **Drive: 6 plays, 75 yards, 2:02.**
- TB – Chandler Catanzaro 25-yard field goal, 0:03. Bengals 27–9. **Drive: 14 plays, 53 yards, 2:31.**

**Third quarter**

- TB – Peyton Barber 1-yard run (Chandler Catanzaro kick), 9:18. Bengals 27–16. **Drive: 11 plays, 75 yards, 5:42.**
- CIN – Jessie Bates 21-yard interception return (Randy Bullock kick), 2:10. Bengals 34–16.

**Fourth quarter**

- TB – Chandler Catanzaro 38-yard field goal, 12:54. Bengals 34–19. **Drive: 8 plays, 55 yards, 4:16.**
- TB – Mike Evans 72-yard pass from Ryan Fitzpatrick (Chandler Catanzaro kick), 9:57. Bengals 34–26. **Drive: 2 plays, 68 yards, 1:19.**
- TB – O. J. Howard 18-yard pass from Ryan Fitzpatrick (Ryan Fitzpatrick-Chris Godwin pass), 1:05. Tied 34–34. **Drive: 10 plays, 88 yards, 2:11.**
- CIN – Randy Bullock 44-yard field goal, 0:00. Bengals 37–34. **Drive: 8 plays, 50 yards, 1:05.**

**Top passers**

- TB – Jameis Winston – 18/35, 276 yards, 1 TD, 4 INT
- CIN – Andy Dalton – 21/34, 280 yards, 2 TD

**Top rushers**

- TB – Peyton Barber – 19 carries, 85 yards, 1 TD
- CIN – Joe Mixon – 21 carries, 123 yards, 2 TD

**Top receivers**

- TB – Mike Evans – 6 receptions, 179 yards, 1 TD
- CIN – Tyler Boyd – 9 receptions, 138 yards, 1 TD

This was the first ever NFL game in which both Head Coaches were graduates of Idaho State University.

==== Week 9: at Carolina Panthers ====
Week Nine: Tampa Bay Buccaneers at Carolina Panthers – Game summary

Quarter	1	2	3	4	Total
Buccaneers	0	14	7	7	**28**
**Panthers**	14	21	0	7	**42**

at Bank of America Stadium, Charlotte, North Carolina

- Date: November 4
- Game time: 1:00 pm. EST
- Game weather: 62 °F (17 °C), sunny
- Game attendance: 73,513
- Referee: Tony Corrente
- TV announcers (Fox): Kenny Albert, Ronde Barber and Sara Walsh
- Recap, Gamebook

Game information

First quarter

- CAR – Alexander Armah 1-yard run (Graham Gano kick), 10:34. Panthers 7–0. **Drive: 3 plays, 10 yards, 1:09.**
- CAR – Christian McCaffrey 3-yard run (Graham Gano kick), 3:14. Panthers 14–0. **Drive: 8 plays, 88 yards, 3:58.**

Second quarter

- TB – O. J. Howard 4-yard pass from Ryan Fitzpatrick (Chandler Catanzaro kick), 14:15. Panthers 14–7. **Drive: 8 plays, 75 yards, 3:59.**
- CAR – Curtis Samuel 33-yard run (Graham Gano kick), 11:20. Panthers 21–7. **Drive: 5 plays, 75 yards, 2:55.**
- CAR – Christian McCaffrey 1-yard run (Graham Gano kick), 7:24. Panthers 28–7. **Drive: 4 plays, 42 yards, 1:37.**
- CAR – Greg Olsen 17-yard pass from Cam Newton (Graham Gano kick), 4:01. Panthers 35–7. **Drive: 5 plays, 25 yards, 2:25.**
- TB – O. J. Howard 3-yard pass from Ryan Fitzpatrick (Chandler Catanzaro kick), 0:15. Panthers 35–14. **Drive: 11 plays, 75 yards, 3:46.**

Third quarter

- TB – Adam Humphries 5-yard pass from Ryan Fitzpatrick (Chandler Catanzaro kick), 5:14. Panthers 35–21. **Drive: 10 plays, 84 yards, 4:31.**

Fourth quarter

- TB – Adam Humphries 30-yard pass from Ryan Fitzpatrick (Chandler Catanzaro kick), 14:24. Panthers 35–28. **Drive: 6 plays, 79 yards, 2:22.**
- CAR – Curtis Samuel 19-yard pass from Cam Newton (Graham Gano kick), 9:04. Panthers 42–28. **Drive: 9 plays, 75 yards, 5:20.**

**Top passers**

- TB – Ryan Fitzpatrick – 24/40, 243 yards, 4 TD, 2 INT
- CAR – Cam Newton – 19/25, 247 yards, 2 TD

**Top rushers**

- TB – Peyton Barber – 11 carries, 31 yards
- CAR – Christian McCaffrey – 17 carries, 79 yards, 2 TD

**Top receivers**

- TB – Adam Humphries – 8 receptions, 82 yards, 2 TD
- CAR – Christian McCaffrey – 5 receptions, 78 yards

==== Week 10: vs. Washington Redskins ====
Week Ten: Washington Redskins at Tampa Bay Buccaneers – Game summary

Quarter	1	2	3	4	Total
**Redskins**	3	3	0	10	**16**
Buccaneers	0	3	0	0	**3**

at Raymond James Stadium, Tampa, Florida

- Date: November 11
- Game time: 1:00 pm. EST
- Game weather: 82 °F (28 °C), clear
- Game attendance: 52,667
- Referee: Brad Allen
- TV announcers (Fox): Thom Brennaman, Chris Spielman and Shannon Spake
- Recap, Gamebook

Game information

**First quarter**

- WAS – Dustin Hopkins 43-yard field goal, 0:10. Redskins 3–0. **Drive: 8 plays, 55 yards, 4:08.**

**Second quarter**

- TB – Chandler Catanzaro 33-yard field goal, 2:03. Tied 3–3. **Drive: 9 plays, 63 yards, 3:55.**
- WAS – Dustin Hopkins 43-yard field goal, 0:20. Redskins 6–3. **Drive: 11 plays, 50 yards, 1:43.**

**Third quarter**

- No scoring plasys.

**Fourth quarter**

- WAS – Josh Doctson 6-yard pass from Alex Smith (Dustin Hopkins kick), 14:07. Redskins 13–3. **Drive: 8 plays, 62 yards, 5:01.**
- WAS – Dustin Hopkins 26-yard field goal, 12:03. Redskins 16–3. **Drive: 4 plays, 6 yards, 1:56.**

**Top passers**

- WAS – Alex Smith – 19/27, 178 yards, TD
- TB – Ryan Fitzpatrick – 29/41, 406 yards, 2 INT

**Top rushers**

- WAS – Adrian Peterson – 19 carries, 68 yards
- TB – Peyton Barber – 13 carries, 61 yards

**Top receivers**

- WAS – Maurice Harris – 5 receptions, 52 yards
- TB – Chris Godwin – 7 receptions, 103 yards

==== Week 11: at New York Giants ====
Week Eleven: Tampa Bay Buccaneers at New York Giants – Game summary

Quarter	1	2	3	4	Total
Buccaneers	0	7	7	21	**35**
**Giants**	7	7	10	14	**38**

at MetLife Stadium, East Rutherford, New Jersey

- Date: November 18
- Game time: 1:00 pm. EST
- Game weather: 42 °F (6 °C), cloudy
- Game attendance: 75,863
- Referee: Shawn Smith
- TV announcers (Fox): Thom Brennaman, Chris Spielman and Shannon Spake
- Recap, Gamebook

Game information

First quarter

- NYG – Saquon Barkley 6-yard pass from Eli Manning (Aldrick Rosas kick), 11:42. Giants 7–0. **Drive: 6 plays, 63 yards, 3:18.**

Second quarter

- NYG – Saquon Barkley 5-yard rush (Aldrick Rosas kick), 13:37. Giants 14–0. **Drive: 12 plays, 95 yards, 6:36.**
- TB – Ryan Fitzpatrick 1-yard rush (Cairo Santos kick), 4:56. Giants 14–7. **Drive: 8 plays, 64 yards, 3:55.**

Third quarter

- NYG – Alec Ogletree 15-yard interception return (Aldrick Rosas kick), 14:13. Giants 21–7.
- NYG – Aldrick Rosas 52-yard field goal, 7:04. Giants 24–7. **Drive: 5 plays, 27 yards, 2:38.**
- TB – Mike Evans fumble recovery in end zone (Cairo Santos kick), 1:32. Giants 24–14. **Drive: 9 plays, 74 yards, 5:32.**

Fourth quarter

- NYG – Odell Beckham Jr. 8-yard pass from Eli Manning (Aldrick Rosas kick), 13:04. Giants 31–14. **Drive: 7 plays, 71 yards, 3:28.**
- TB – Peyton Barber 5-yard rush (Cairo Santos kick), 9:47. Giants 31–21. **Drive: 7 plays, 77 yards, 3:17.**
- TB – Adam Humphries 8-yard pass from Jameis Winston (Cairo Santos kick), 5:11. Giants 31–28. **Drive: 7 plays, 70 yards, 2:22.**
- NYG – Saquon Barkley 2-yard rush (Aldrick Rosas kick), 3:52. Giants 38–28. **Drive: 5 plays, 67 yards, 1:19.**
- TB – Mike Evans 41-yard pass from Jameis Winston (Cairo Santos kick), 2:22. Giants 38–35. **Drive: 6 plays, 66 yards, 1:30.**

**Top passers**

- TB – Jameis Winston – 12/16, 199 yards, 2 TD, 1 INT
- NYG – Eli Manning – 17/18, 231 yards, 2 TD

**Top rushers**

- TB – Peyton Barber – 18 carries, 106 yards, 1 TD
- NYG – Saquon Barkley – 27 carries, 142 yards, 2 TD

**Top receivers**

- TB – Mike Evans – 6 receptions, 120 yards, 1 TD
- NYG – Odell Beckham Jr, – 4 receptions, 74 yards, 1 TD

In the 3rd quarter, Fitzpatrick was benched after throwing his third interception. Winston came into the game for the first time since being benched for Fitzpatrick in Week 8, who was benched for Winston back in Week 4. Down 24–7, the Bucs mounted a comeback, outscoring the Giants 28–14 through the last quarter and a half. However, the Giants held on during their final drive to win the game. With their 4th straight loss, the Bucs fall to 3–7 and remain 4th in the NFC South. The following day, Winston was renamed the starter for Week 12's game against the 49ers by Coach Koetter.

==== Week 12: vs. San Francisco 49ers ====
Week Twelve: San Francisco 49ers at Tampa Bay Buccaneers – Game summary

Quarter	1	2	3	4	Total
49ers	0	6	3	0	**9**
**Buccaneers**	7	6	7	7	**27**

at Raymond James Stadium, Tampa, Florida

- Date: November 25
- Game time: 1:00 pm. EST
- Game weather: 77 °F (25 °C), cloudy
- Game attendance: 50,436
- Referee: John Parry
- TV announcers (Fox): Kenny Albert, Ronde Barber and Jennifer Hale
- Recap, Gamebook

Game information

First quarter

- TB – Cameron Brate 6-yard pass from Jameis Winston (Cairo Santos kick), 8:21. Buccaneers 7–0. **Drive: 7 plays, 73 yards, 3:50.**

Second quarter

- SF – Dante Pettis 13-yard pass from Nick Mullens (kick failed), 8:32. Buccaneers 7–6. **Drive: 9 plays, 79 yards, 5:42.**
- TB – Cairo Santos 41-yard field goal, 3:21. Buccaneers 10–6. **Drive: 12 plays, 53 yards, 5:11.**
- TB – Cairo Santos 39-yard field goal, 0:06. Buccaneers 13–6. **Drive: 8 plays, 38 yards, 1:37.**

Third quarter

- SF – Robbie Gould 23-yard field goal, 11:02. Buccaneers 13–9. **Drive: 10 plays, 78 yards, 3:58.**

Fourth quarter

- TB – Peyton Barber 2-yard rush (Cairo Santos kick), 8:25. Buccaneers 20–9. **Drive: 6 plays, 75 yards, 2:37.**
- TB – Adam Humphries 28-yard pass from Jameis Winston (Cairo Santos kick), 14:10. Buccaneers 27–9. **Drive: 10 plays, 85 yards, 5:00.**

**Top passers**

- SF – Nick Mullens – 18/32, 221 yards, 1 TD, 2 INT
- TB – Jameis Winston – 29/38, 312 yards, 2 TD

**Top rushers**

- SF – Matt Breida – 14 carries, 106 yards
- TB – Peyton Barber – 18 carries, 47 yards, 1 TD

**Top receivers**

- SF – Dante Pettis – 4 receptions, 77 yards, 1 TD
- TB – Mike Evans – 6 receptions, 116 yards

The Bucs snapped their four-game losing streak with a win. Highlights from this game include Jason Pierre-Paul recording his 10th sack of the season, becoming the first Buccaneer to have a double digit sack season since Simeon Rice in 2005, Mike Evans achieving his fifth straight 1,000-yard receiving season and the Buccaneers defense recording their first turnover since Week 3. With this win, the Bucs move to 4–7, but remain last in the NFC South.

==== Week 13: vs. Carolina Panthers ====
Week Thirteen: Carolina Panthers at Tampa Bay Buccaneers – Game summary

Quarter	1	2	3	4	Total
Panthers	7	0	10	0	**17**
**Buccaneers**	10	7	7	0	**24**

at Raymond James Stadium, Tampa, Florida

- Date: December 2
- Game time: 1:00 pm. EST
- Game weather: 81 °F (27 °C), cloudy
- Game attendance: 52,568
- Referee: Carl Cheffers
- TV announcers (Fox): Kenny Albert, Ronde Barber and Sara Walsh
- Recap, Gamebook

Game information

First quarter

- TB – Adam Humphries 3-yard pass from Jameis Winston (Cairo Santos kick), 9:46. Buccaneers 7–0. **Drive: 11 plays, 75 yards, 5:14.**
- TB – Cairo Santos 35-yard field goal, 6:41. Buccaneers 10–0. **Drive: 4 plays, 3 yards, 1:30.**
- CAR – Christian McCaffrey 8-yard pass from Cam Newton (Graham Gano kick), 4:14. Buccaneers 10–7. **Drive: 4 plays, 73 yards, 2:27.**

Second quarter

- TB – Chris Godwin 13-yard pass from Jameis Winston (Cairo Santos kick), 0:13. Buccaneers 17–7. **Drive: 5 plays, 32 yards, 0:52.**

Third quarter

- CAR – Graham Gano 37-yard field goal, 10:58. Buccaneers 17–10. **Drive: 9 plays, 56 yards, 4:02.**
- TB – Peyton Barber 1-yard rush (Cairo Santos kick), 7:23. Buccaneers 24–10. **Drive: 6 plays, 75 yards, 3:35.**
- CAR – Devin Funchess 10-yard pass from Cam Newton (Graham Gano kick), 2:24. Buccaneers 24–17. **Drive: 10 plays, 92 yards, 4:59.**

Fourth quarter

- No scoring plays.

**Top passers**

- CAR – Cam Newton – 28/41, 300 yards, 2 TD, 4 INT
- TB – Jameis Winston – 20/30, 249 yards, 2 TD

**Top rushers**

- CAR – Christian McCaffrey – 10 carries, 106 yards
- TB – Jameis Winston – 5 carries, 48 yards

**Top receivers**

- CAR – Christian McCaffrey – 9 receptions, 55 yards, 1 TD
- TB – Chris Godwin – 5 receptions, 101 yards, 1 TD

The Bucs defeated the Panthers after a good defensive effort, including picking off Cam Newton four times, with Andrew Adams responsible for three of the four interceptions. The defense also sacked Newton four times. On offense, Chris Godwin led the team with 101 yards on 5 catches, including a 13-yard touchdown reception. With the win, the Bucs improved to 5–7 and moved to third place in the NFC South.

==== Week 14: vs. New Orleans Saints ====
Week Fourteen: New Orleans Saints at Tampa Bay Buccaneers – Game summary

Quarter	1	2	3	4	Total
**Saints**	0	3	8	17	**28**
Buccaneers	7	7	0	0	**14**

at Raymond James Stadium, Tampa, Florida

- Date: December 9
- Game time: 1:00 pm. EST
- Game weather: 71 °F (22 °C), cloudy
- Game attendance: 53,495
- Referee: Jerome Boger
- TV announcers (Fox): Kenny Albert, Ronde Barber and Sara Walsh
- Recap, Gamebook

Game information

First quarter

- TB – Cameron Brate 11-yard pass from Jameis Winston (Cairo Santos kick), 12:19. Buccaneers 7–0. **Drive: 7 plays, 75 yards, 2:41.**

Second quarter

- NO – Wil Lutz 30-yard field goal, 7:06. Buccaneers 7–3. **Drive: 9 plays, 52 yards, 4:11.**
- TB – Cameron Brate 1-yard pass from Jameis Winston (Cairo Santos kick), 0:26. Buccaneers 14–3. **Drive: 6 plays, 39 yards, 1:56.**

Third quarter

- NO – Zach Line 1-yard pass from Drew Brees (Alvin Kamara rush), 4:43. Buccaneers 14–11. **Drive: 5 plays, 30 yards, 2:35.**

Fourth quarter

- NO – Drew Brees 1-yard rush (Wil Lutz kick), 11:46. Saints 18–14. **Drive: 10 plays, 51 yards, 5:35.**
- NO – Mark Ingram II 17-yard rush (Wil Lutz kick), 7:26. Saints 25–14. **Drive: 7 plays, 53 yards, 3:08.**
- NO – Wil Lutz 36-yard field goal, 1:12. Saints 28–14. **Drive: 11 plays, 41 yards, 4:20.**

**Top passers**

- NO – Drew Brees – 24/31, 201 yards, 1 TD, 1 INT
- TB – Jameis Winston – 18/38, 213 yards, 2 TD, 1 INT

**Top rushers**

- NO – Mark Ingram II – 13 carries, 52 yards, 1 TD
- TB – Jameis Winston – 5 carries, 47 yards

**Top receivers**

- NO – Michael Thomas – 11 receptions, 98 yards
- TB – Mike Evans – 4 receptions, 86 yards

The Bucs fall to 5–8 with this loss. After being up 14–3 at the half, the Saints outscored the Bucs 25–0 in the second half to get the win. Even with the loss, the Bucs still remain third in the NFC South.

==== Week 15: at Baltimore Ravens ====
Week Fifteen: Tampa Bay Buccaneers at Baltimore Ravens – Game summary

Quarter	1	2	3	4	Total
Buccaneers	0	9	3	0	**12**
**Ravens**	0	10	7	3	**20**

at M&T Bank Stadium, Baltimore, Maryland

- Date: December 16
- Game time: 1:00 pm. EST
- Game weather: 43 °F (6 °C), cloudy, rain
- Game attendance: 70,031
- Referee: Ronald Torbert
- TV announcers (Fox): Dick Stockton, Mark Schlereth and Jennifer Hale
- Recap, Gamebook

Game information

**First quarter**

- No scoring plays.

**Second quarter**

- TB – Peyton Barber 3-yard rush (rush failed), 12:08. Buccaneers 6–0. **Drive: 8 plays, 51 yards, 4:16.**
- BAL – Chris Moore 5-yard pass from Lamar Jackson (Justin Tucker kick), 3:58. Ravens 7–6. **Drive: 16 plays, 73 yards, 8:10.**
- TB – Cairo Santos 21-yard field goal, 1:48. Buccaneers 9–7. **Drive: 7 plays, 72 yards, 2:10.**
- BAL – Justin Tucker 24-yard field goal, 0:09. Ravens 10–9. **Drive: 6 plays, 83 yards, 1:39.**

**Third quarter**

- BAL – Gus Edwards 10-yard rush (Justin Tucker kick), 10:03. Ravens 17–9. **Drive: 10 plays, 78 yards, 4:57.**
- TB – Cairo Santos 28-yard field goal, 5:43. Ravens 17–12. **Drive: 4 plays, 5 yards, 2:06.**

**Fourth quarter**

- BAL – Justin Tucker 35-yard field goal, 13:32. Ravens 20–12. **Drive: 15 plays, 38 yards, 7:11.**

**Top passers**

- TB – Jameis Winston – 13/25, 157 yards, 1 INT
- BAL – Lamar Jackson – `14/23, 131 yards, 1 TD

**Top rushers**

- TB – Peyton Barber – 19 carries, 85 yards, 1 TD
- BAL – Gus Edwards – 19 carries, 104 yards, 1 TD

**Top receivers**

- TB – Mike Evans – 4 receptions, 121 yards
- BAL – Willie Snead IV – 5 receptions, 58 yards

With the loss the Bucs were eliminated from playoff contention for the 11th year in a row.

==== Week 16: at Dallas Cowboys ====
Week Sixteen: Tampa Bay Buccaneers at Dallas Cowboys – Game summary

Quarter	1	2	3	4	Total
Buccaneers	3	10	0	7	**20**
**Cowboys**	14	3	10	0	**27**

at AT&T Stadium, Arlington, Texas

- Date: December 23
- Game time: 1:00 pm. EST/12:00 pm. CST
- Game weather: Played indoors (retractable roof closed)
- Game attendance: 92,851
- Referee: Shawn Hochuli
- TV announcers (Fox): Joe Buck, Troy Aikman and Erin Andrews
- Recap, Gamebook

Game information

**First quarter**

- TB – Cairo Santos 37-yard field goal, 12:12. Buccaneers 3–0. **Drive: 7 plays, 45 yards, 2:52.**
- DAL – Dak Prescott 7-yard run (Brett Maher kick), 7:12. Cowboys 7–3. **Drive: 8 plays, 75 yards, 5:01.**
- DAL – Jaylon Smith 69-yard fumble return (Brett Maher kick), 1:57. Cowboys 14–3.

**Second quarter**

- TB – Cairo Santos 45-yard field goal, 9:19. Cowboys 14–6. **Drive: 14 plays, 44 yards, 7:28.**
- DAL – Brett Maher 59-yard field goal, 1:48. Cowboys 17–6. **Drive: 4 plays, 5 yards, 0:26.**
- TB – Jacquizz Rodgers 2-yard run (Cairo Santos kick), 0:25. Cowboys 17–13. **Drive: 8 plays, 75 yards, 1:23.**

**Third quarter**

- DAL – Brett Maher 20-yard field goal, 3:44. Cowboys 20–13. **Drive: 12 plays, 56 yards, 6:59.**
- DAL – Michael Gallup 4-yard pass from Dak Prescott (Brett Maher kick), 2:27. Cowboys 27–13. **Drive: 2 plays, 4 yards, 0:09.**

**Fourth quarter**

- TB – Mike Evans 7-yard pass from Jameis Winston (Cairo Santos kick), 2:12. Cowboys 27–20. **Drive: 8 plays, 71 yards, 2:23.**

**Top passers**

- TB – Jameis Winston – 34/48, 336 yards, TD
- DAL – Dak Prescott – 20/25, 161 yards, TD

**Top rushers**

- TB – Peyton Barber – 17 rushes, 43 yards
- DAL – Ezekiel Elliott – 18 rushes, 85 yards

**Top receivers**

- TB – Mike Evans – 6 receptions, 90 yards, TD
- DAL – Michael Gallup – 3 receptions, 53 yards, TD

==== Week 17: vs. Atlanta Falcons ====
Week Seventeen: Atlanta Falcons at Tampa Bay Buccaneers – Game summary

Quarter	1	2	3	4	Total
**Falcons**	0	7	17	10	**34**
Buccaneers	7	10	3	12	**32**

at Raymond James Stadium, Tampa, Florida

- Date: December 30
- Game time: 1:00 pm. EST
- Game weather: 80 °F (27 °C), cloudy
- Game attendance: 52,884
- Referee: Brad Allen
- TV announcers (Fox): Dick Stockton, Mark Schlereth and Jennifer Hale
- Recap, Gamebook

Game information

First quarter

- TB – Mike Evans 19-yard pass from Jameis Winston (Cairo Santos kick), 3:48. Buccaneers 7–0. **Drive: 12 plays, 93 yards, 6:28.**

Second quarter

- TB – Cairo Santos 36-yard field goal, 8:25. Buccaneers 10–0. **Drive: 9 plays, 35 yards, 4:16.**
- TB – Chris Godwin 30-yard pass from Jameis Winston (Cairo Santos kick), 0:46. Buccaneers 17–0. **Drive: 4 plays, 70 yards, 0:56.**
- ATL – Julio Jones 19-yard pass from Matt Ryan (Matt Bryant kick), 0:20. Buccaneers 17–7. **Drive: 5 plays, 75 yards, 0:26.**

Third quarter

- ATL – Matt Ryan 5-yard pass from Mohamed Sanu (Matt Bryant kick), 8:49. Buccaneers 17–14. **Drive: 14 plays, 75 yards, 6:11.**
- TB – Cairo Santos 45-yard field goal, 6:39. Buccaneers 20–14. **Drive: 6 plays, 48 yards, 2:10.**
- ATL – Matt Bryant 49-yard field goal, 1:59. Buccaneers 20–17. **Drive: 10 plays, 42 yards, 4:40.**
- ATL – Tevin Coleman 23-yard rush (Matt Bryant kick), 0:44. Falcons 24–20. **Drive: 3 plays, 43 yards, 0:35.**

Fourth quarter

- ATL – Calvin Ridley 7-yard pass from Matt Ryan (Matt Bryant kick), 10:51. Falcons 31–20. **Drive: 7 plays, 75 yards, 3:59.**
- TB – Mike Evans 10-yard pass from Jameis Winston (pass failed), 8:09. Falcons 31–26. **Drive: 6 plays, 75 yards, 2:42.**
- TB – Chris Godwin 19-yard pass from Jameis Winston (pass failed), 5:10. Buccaneers 32–31. **Drive: 2 plays, 34 yards, 0:44.**
- ATL – Matt Bryant 37-yard field goal, 0:00. Falcons 34–32. **Drive: 13 plays, 56 yards, 5:10.**

**Top passers**

- ATL – Matt Ryan – 31/44, 378 yards, 2 TD, 1 INT
- TB – Jameis Winston – 22/35, 345 yards, 4 TD, 1 INT

**Top rushers**

- ATL – Tevin Coleman – 8 carries, 45 yards, 1 TD
- TB – Peyton Barber – 15 carries, 66 yards

**Top receivers**

- ATL – Julio Jones – 9 receptions, 138 yards, 2 TD
- TB – Chris Godwin – 6 receptions, 114 yards, 2 TD

Despite leading 17–0 shortly before halftime, the Buccaneers lost the lead and fell 20–31 by the fourth quarter. Although they scored twice in the fourth quarter, two failed two-point conversions only gave them a 32–31 lead, and a 37-yard Matt Bryant field goal sealed the 32–34 loss. This loss dropped the Buccaneers to 5–11 and fourth in the NFC South for the second year in a row.

=== Standings ===
==== Division ====
NFC South
	W	L	T	PCT	DIV	CONF	PF	PA	STK
^{(1)} New Orleans Saints	13	3	0	.813	4–2	9–3	504	353	L1
Atlanta Falcons	7	9	0	.438	4–2	7–5	414	423	W3
Carolina Panthers	7	9	0	.438	2–4	5–7	376	382	W1
Tampa Bay Buccaneers	5	11	0	.313	2–4	4–8	396	464	L4

==== Conference ====
NFC
#	Team	Division	W	L	T	PCT	DIV	CONF	SOS	SOV	STK
**Division leaders**
1 (Note: New Orleans finished ahead of LA Rams based on head-to-head victory, claiming the No. 1 seed.)	New Orleans Saints	South	13	3	0	.813	4–2	9–3	.482	.488	L1
2	Los Angeles Rams	West	13	3	0	.813	6–0	9–3	.480	.428	W2
3	Chicago Bears	North	12	4	0	.750	5–1	10–2	.430	.419	W4
4	Dallas Cowboys	East	10	6	0	.625	5–1	9–3	.488	.444	W2
**Wild Cards**
5	Seattle Seahawks	West	10	6	0	.625	3–3	8–4	.484	.400	W2
6	Philadelphia Eagles	East	9	7	0	.563	4–2	6–6	.518	.486	W3
**Did not qualify for the postseason**
7	Minnesota Vikings	North	8	7	1	.531	3–2–1	6–5–1	.504	.355	L1
8 (Note: Atlanta finished ahead of Washington based on head-to-head victory. Atlanta finished ahead of Carolina based on head-to-head sweep. Washington finished ahead of Carolina based on head-to-head victory.)	Atlanta Falcons	South	7	9	0	.438	4–2	7–5	.482	.348	W3
9	Washington Redskins	East	7	9	0	.438	2–4	6–6	.486	.371	L2
10	Carolina Panthers	South	7	9	0	.438	2–4	5–7	.508	.518	W1
11	Green Bay Packers	North	6	9	1	.406	1–4–1	3–8–1	.488	.417	L1
12	Detroit Lions	North	6	10	0	.375	2–4	4–8	.504	.427	W1
13 (Note: NY Giants finished ahead of Tampa Bay based on head-to-head victory.)	New York Giants	East	5	11	0	.313	1–5	4–8	.527	.487	L3
14	Tampa Bay Buccaneers	South	5	11	0	.313	2–4	4–8	.523	.506	L4
15	San Francisco 49ers	West	4	12	0	.250	1–5	2–10	.504	.406	L2
16	Arizona Cardinals	West	3	13	0	.188	2–4	3–9	.527	.302	L4
**Tiebreakers** (Note: When breaking ties for three or more teams under the NFL's rules, they are first broken within divisions, then comparing only the highest-ranked remaining team from each division.)

== Awards ==
- Week 1: NFC Offensive Player of the Week – Ryan Fitzpatrick
- Week 1: FedEx Air Player of the Week – Ryan Fitzpatrick
- Week 2: NFC Offensive Player of the Week – Ryan Fitzpatrick
