= 2018 Atlanta Falcons season =

53rd season in franchise history

- Owner: Arthur Blank
- General manager: Thomas Dimitroff
- Head coach: Dan Quinn
- Home stadium: Mercedes-Benz Stadium

Results
- Record: 7–9
- Division place: 2nd NFC South
- Playoffs: Did not qualify
- Pro Bowlers: WR Julio Jones; C Alex Mack; TE Austin Hooper; T Jake Matthews

Uniform
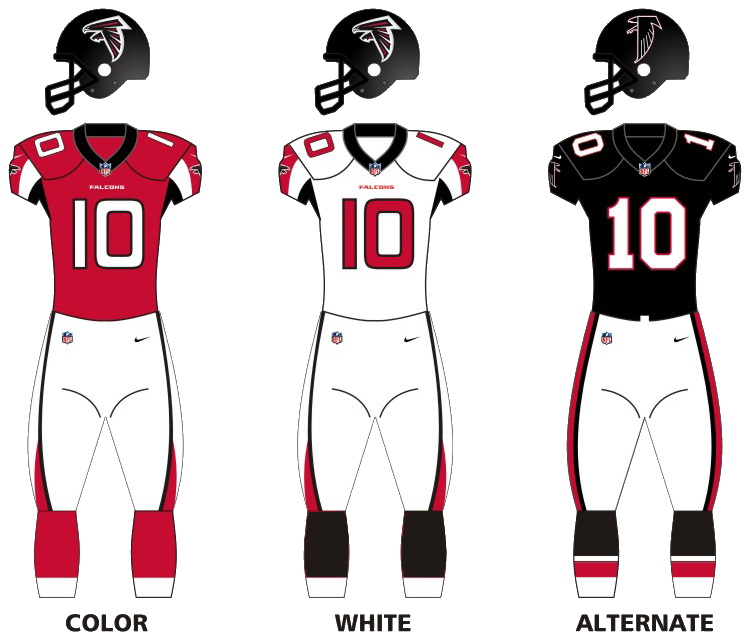

The 2018 season was the Atlanta Falcons' 53rd in the National Football League (NFL), their second playing their home games at Mercedes-Benz Stadium (the venue for Super Bowl LIII) and their fourth under head coach Dan Quinn. The Falcons attempted to be the first team to play the Super Bowl in their home stadium as an expected Super Bowl contender. However, the Falcons were riddled with injuries, losing 7 starters to IR with the Falcons stumbling to a 1–4 start.

Following a 31–17 loss to the Saints in Week 12, the Falcons fell to 4–7 and failed to match their 10–6 campaign from 2017. With a 34–20 loss to the Green Bay Packers, the Falcons fell to 4–9 and suffered their first losing season since the 2014 season. Despite beating the Arizona Cardinals 40–14 in Week 15, the Falcons were eliminated from playoff contention for the first time since 2015 with a win by the Minnesota Vikings. From 2018 to present, the Falcons have failed to make the playoffs along with having a losing season. However, they were able to end their season with a 3 game win streak to finish 7–9.

== Roster changes ==
=== Free agents ===
==== Unrestricted ====
Position	Player	2018 team	Date signed	Contract
CB	Blidi Wreh-Wilson	Atlanta Falcons	March 5, 2018	1 year, $880,000
K	Matt Bryant	Atlanta Falcons	March 10, 2018	3 years, $10.1 million
WR	Taylor Gabriel	Chicago Bears	March 13, 2018	4 years, $26 million
DT	Dontari Poe	Carolina Panthers	March 15, 2018	3 years, $28 million

== Draft ==
2018 Atlanta Falcons Draft
Round	Selection	Player	Position	College	Notes
1	26	Calvin Ridley	WR	Alabama	
2	58	Isaiah Oliver	CB	Colorado	
3	90	Deadrin Senat	DT	South Florida	
4	126	Ito Smith	RB	Southern Miss	
6	194	Russell Gage	WR	LSU	from Los Angeles Rams
6	200	Foyesade Oluokun	LB	Yale	

Draft trades

- The Falcons traded their fifth-round selection (163rd overall) to Denver in exchange for offensive tackle Ty Sambrailo.
- The Falcons were awarded a seventh-round compensatory pick (256th overall).
- The Falcons traded both of their seventh-round selections (244th and 256th overall) to Los Angeles in exchange for the Rams' sixth-round selection (194th overall).

== Staff ==
2018 Atlanta Falcons staff
Front office: Owner/chairman – Arthur Blank; President/CEO – Rich McKay; General manager – Thomas Dimitroff; Assistant general manager – Scott Pioli; Director of pro personnel – Joel Collier; Director, football operations – Nick Polk; Director of college scouting – Steve Sabo; National scout – Ruston Webster; National scout – Phil Emery; Head coaches: Head coach – Dan Quinn; Assistant head coach/pass game coordinator – Raheem Morris; Assistant to the head coach – Steve Scarnecchia; Offensive coaches: Offensive coordinator – Steve Sarkisian; Quarterbacks – Greg Knapp; Running backs – Bernie Parmalee; Wide receivers – Dave Brock; Tight ends – Wade Harman; Run game coordinator/offensive line – Chris Morgan; Assistant offensive line – Kyle Flood; Offensive assistant – Justin Outten; Offensive assistant – Chad Walker	Defensive coaches: Defensive coordinator – Marquand Manuel; Defensive line – Bryant Young; Assistant defensive line – Travis Jones; Linebackers – Jeff Ulbrich; Defensive passing game coordinator – Jerome Henderson; Defensive backs – Doug Mallory; Defensive assistant – Charlie Jackson; Defensive quality control – Aden Durde; Special teams coaches: Special teams coordinator – Keith Armstrong; Assistant special teams – Mayur Chaudhari; Strength and conditioning: Head strength and conditioning – Jesse Ackerman; Assistant strength and conditioning – Jonas Beauchemin; Assistant strength – Brandon Ireland

== Final roster ==
2018 Atlanta Falcons roster
Quarterbacks (QB): 2 Matt Ryan; 8 Matt Schaub; Running backs (RB): 26 Tevin Coleman; 32 Brian Hill; 43 Jeremy Langford; 30 Ricky Ortiz FB; Wide receivers (WR): 83 Russell Gage; 17 Marvin Hall; 14 Justin Hardy; 11 Julio Jones; 18 Calvin Ridley; 12 Mohamed Sanu; Tight ends (TE): 81 Austin Hooper; 82 Logan Paulsen; 85 Eric Saubert	Offensive linemen (OL): 69 Zane Beadles G; 63 Ben Garland G; 77 Matt Gono T; 51 Alex Mack C; 70 Jake Matthews T; 74 Ty Sambrailo T/G; 73 Ryan Schraeder T; 71 Wes Schweitzer G; Defensive linemen (DL): 44 Vic Beasley DE; 95 Jack Crawford DT; 97 Grady Jarrett DT; 99 Terrell McClain DT; 98 Takkarist McKinley DE; 56 Steven Means DE; 50 Brooks Reed DE; 94 Deadrin Senat DT; 92 Justin Zimmer DT	Linebackers (LB): 59 De'Vondre Campbell OLB; 55 Bruce Carter OLB; 52 Bruce Irvin OLB; 36 Kemal Ishmael OLB; 45 Deion Jones MLB; 54 Foyesade Oluokun MLB; 42 Duke Riley OLB; Defensive backs (DB): 23 Robert Alford CB; 28 Justin Bethel CB; 27 Damontae Kazee SS; 40 Ryan Neal FS; 41 Sharrod Neasman SS; 20 Isaiah Oliver CB/FS; 34 Brian Poole CB; 29 Jordan Richards FS; 21 Desmond Trufant CB; 33 Blidi Wreh-Wilson CB; Special teams (ST): 5 Matt Bosher P; 3 Matt Bryant K; 46 Jon Condo LS; 4 Giorgio Tavecchio K	Practice squad: 6 Kurt Benkert QB; 16 Christian Blake WR; 76 Daniel Brunskill T; 38 Taveze Calhoun CB; 61 Chris Durant T; 53 Jermaine Grace OLB; 87 Jaeden Graham TE; 89 Alex Gray TE ^{Int'l}; 15 Devin Gray WR; 65 Sean Harlow C; 79 Jacob Tuioti-Mariner DE; Reserve: 37 Ricardo Allen FS (IR); 24 Devonta Freeman RB (IR); 65 Brandon Fusco G (IR); 47 Josh Harris LS (IR); 67 Andy Levitre G (IR); 22 Keanu Neal SS (IR); 90 Derrick Shelby DE (IR); 25 Ito Smith RB (IR); Rookies in italics 53 active, 8 reserve, 11 practice squad

== Preseason ==
The Falcons' preseason opponents and schedule was announced on April 11.

Week	Date	Opponent	Result	Record	Venue	Recap
1	August 10	at New York Jets	L 0–17	0–1	MetLife Stadium	Recap
2	August 17	Kansas City Chiefs	L 14–28	0–2	Mercedes-Benz Stadium	Recap
3	August 25	at Jacksonville Jaguars	L 6–17	0–3	EverBank Field	Recap
4	August 30	Miami Dolphins	L 7–34	0–4	Mercedes-Benz Stadium	Recap

== Regular season ==
=== Schedule ===
Week	Date	Opponent	Result	Record	Venue	Recap
1	September 6	at Philadelphia Eagles	**L** 12–18	0–1	Lincoln Financial Field	Recap
2	September 16	**Carolina Panthers**	**W** 31–24	1–1	Mercedes-Benz Stadium	Recap
3	September 23	**New Orleans Saints**	**L** 37–43 (OT)	1–2	Mercedes-Benz Stadium	Recap
4	September 30	Cincinnati Bengals	**L** 36–37	1–3	Mercedes-Benz Stadium	Recap
5	October 7	at Pittsburgh Steelers	**L** 17–41	1–4	Heinz Field	Recap
6	October 14	**Tampa Bay Buccaneers**	**W** 34–29	2–4	Mercedes-Benz Stadium	Recap
7	October 22	New York Giants	**W** 23–20	3–4	Mercedes-Benz Stadium	Recap
8	Bye					
9	November 4	at Washington Redskins	**W** 38–14	4–4	FedExField	Recap
10	November 11	at Cleveland Browns	**L** 16–28	4–5	FirstEnergy Stadium	Recap
11	November 18	Dallas Cowboys	**L** 19–22	4–6	Mercedes-Benz Stadium	Recap
12	November 22	at **New Orleans Saints**	**L** 17–31	4–7	Mercedes-Benz Superdome	Recap
13	December 2	Baltimore Ravens	**L** 16–26	4–8	Mercedes-Benz Stadium	Recap
14	December 9	at Green Bay Packers	**L** 20–34	4–9	Lambeau Field	Recap
15	December 16	Arizona Cardinals	**W** 40–14	5–9	Mercedes-Benz Stadium	Recap
16	December 23	at **Carolina Panthers**	**W** 24–10	6–9	Bank of America Stadium	Recap
17	December 30	at **Tampa Bay Buccaneers**	**W** 34–32	7–9	Raymond James Stadium	Recap

Note: Intra-division opponents are in bold text.

=== Game summaries ===
==== Week 1: at Philadelphia Eagles ====
NFL Kickoff Game

Week One: Atlanta Falcons at Philadelphia Eagles – Game summary

Quarter	1	2	3	4	Total
Falcons	3	3	0	6	**12**
**Eagles**	0	3	7	8	**18**

at Lincoln Financial Field, Philadelphia, Pennsylvania

- Date: September 6
- Game time: 8:20 p.m. EDT
- Game weather: 81 °F (27 °C), Cloudy
- Game attendance: 69,696
- Referee: John Hussey
- TV announcers (NBC): Al Michaels, Cris Collinsworth and Michele Tafoya and Terry McAulay
- Recap, Gamebook

Game information

**First quarter**

- ATL – Matt Bryant 21-yard field goal, 5:01. Falcons 3–0. **Drive: 9 plays, 41 yards, 4:07.**

**Second quarter**

- PHI – Jake Elliott 26-yard field goal, 6:09. Tied 3–3. **Drive: 14 plays, 52 yards, 8:03.**
- ATL – Matt Bryant 52-yard field goal, 2:08. Falcons 6–3. **Drive: 8 plays, 41 yards, 4:01.**

**Third quarter**

- PHI – Jay Ajayi 1-yard run (Jake Elliott kick), 4:37. Eagles 10–6. **Drive: 11 plays, 63 yards, 5:34.**

**Fourth quarter**

- ATL – Tevin Coleman 9-yard run (kick failed), 9:48. Falcons 12–10. **Drive: 2 plays, 27 yards, 0:47.**
- PHI – Jay Ajayi 11-yard run (Jay Ajayi run), 2:19. Eagles 18–12. **Drive: 8 plays, 54 yards, 2:32.**

**Top passers**

- ATL – Matt Ryan – 21/43, 251 yards, INT
- PHI – Nick Foles – 19/34, 117 yards, INT

**Top rushers**

- ATL – Devonta Freeman – 6 rushes, 36 yards
- PHI – Jay Ajayi – 15 rushes, 62 yards, 2 TD

**Top receivers**

- ATL – Julio Jones – 10 receptions, 169 yards
- PHI – Zach Ertz – 5 receptions, 48 yards

==== Week 2: vs. Carolina Panthers ====
Week Two: Carolina Panthers at Atlanta Falcons – Game summary

Quarter	1	2	3	4	Total
Panthers	3	7	0	14	**24**
**Falcons**	3	14	7	7	**31**

at Mercedes-Benz Stadium, Atlanta, Georgia

- Date: September 16
- Game time: 1:00 p.m. EDT
- Game weather: Played indoors (retractable roof closed)
- Game attendance: 72,528
- Referee: Bill Vinovich
- TV announcers (Fox): Dan Hellie, Greg Jennings and Karyn Bryant
- Recap, Gamebook

Game information

**First quarter**

- CAR – Graham Gano 54-yard field goal, 11:36. Panthers 3–0. **Drive: 7 plays, 39 yards, 3:24.**
- ATL – Matt Bryant 44-yard field goal, 5:41. Tied 3–3. **Drive: 10 plays, 57 yards, 5:55.**

**Second quarter**

- CAR – Jarius Wright 5-yard pass from Cam Newton (Graham Gano kick), 8:42. Panthers 10–3. **Drive: 13 plays, 70 yards, 6:28.**
- ATL – Calvin Ridley 11-yard pass from Matt Ryan (Matt Bryant kick), 4:03. Tied 10–10. **Drive: 9 plays, 75 yards, 4:39.**
- ATL – Austin Hooper 8-yard pass from Matt Ryan (Matt Bryant kick), 0:22. Falcons 17–10. **Drive: 7 plays, 85 yards, 1:13.**

**Third quarter**

- ATL – Matt Ryan 1-yard run (Matt Bryant kick), 9:23. Falcons 24–10. **Drive: 7 plays, 58 yards, 3:26.**

**Fourth quarter**

- CAR – Torrey Smith 3-yard pass from Cam Newton (Graham Gano kick), 11:23. Falcons 24–17. **Drive: 11 plays, 80 yards, 5:21.**
- ATL – Matt Ryan 8-yard run (Matt Bryant kick), 7:17. Falcons 31–17. **Drive: 7 plays, 75 yards, 4:06.**
- CAR – D. J. Moore 51-yard pass from Cam Newton (Graham Gano kick), 2:20. Falcons 31–24. **Drive: 5 plays, 96 yards, 1:36.**

**Top passers**

- CAR – Cam Newton – 32/45, 335 yards, 3 TD, 1 INT
- ATL – Matt Ryan – 23/28, 272 yards, 2 TD, 1 INT

**Top rushers**

- CAR – Cam Newton – 5 carries, 42 yards
- ATL – Tevin Coleman – 16 carries, 107 yards

**Top receivers**

- CAR – Christian McCaffrey – 14 receptions, 102 yards
- ATL – Julio Jones – 5 receptions, 64 yards

==== Week 3: vs. New Orleans Saints ====
Week Three: New Orleans Saints at Atlanta Falcons – Game summary

Quarter	1	2	3	4	OT	Total
**Saints**	7	9	7	14	6	**43**
Falcons	7	7	7	16	0	**37**

at Mercedes-Benz Stadium, Atlanta, Georgia

- Date: September 23
- Game time: 1:00 p.m. EDT
- Game weather: Played indoors (retractable roof closed)
- Game attendance: 74,457
- Referee: Walt Anderson
- TV announcers (Fox): Sam Rosen, Cris Carter and Sara Walsh
- Recap, Gamebook

Game information

**First quarter**

- NO – Ted Ginn Jr. 4-yard pass from Drew Brees (Wil Lutz kick), 11:45. Saints 7–0. **Drive: 6 plays, 75 yards, 3:15.**
- ATL – Calvin Ridley 18-yard pass from Matt Ryan (Matt Bryant kick), 2:45. Tied 7–7. **Drive: 12 plays, 81 yards, 6:06.**

**Second quarter**

- NO – Wil Lutz 49-yard field goal, 9:37. Saints 10–7. **Drive: 6 plays, 31 yards, 2:21.**
- NO – Wil Lutz 21-yard field goal, 3:06. Saints 13–7. **Drive: 8 plays, 70 yards, 4:46.**
- ATL – Calvin Ridley 75-yard pass from Matt Ryan (Matt Bryant kick), 2:12. Falcons 14–13. **Drive: 2 plays, 75 yards, 0:54.**
- NO – Wil Lutz 45-yard field goal, 0:06. Saints 16–14. **Drive: 3 plays, 31 yards, 0:34.**

**Third quarter**

- ATL – Calvin Ridley 9-yard pass from Matt Ryan (Matt Bryant kick), 12:00. Falcons 21–16. **Drive: 6 plays, 75 yards, 3:00.**
- NO – Cameron Meredith 11-yard pass from Drew Brees (Wil Lutz kick), 6:07. Saints 23–21. **Drive: 4 plays, 16 yards, 2:29.**

'Fourth quarter

- ATL – Tevin Coleman 5-yard pass from Matt Ryan (Matt Ryan-Austin Hooper pass), 14:11. Falcons 29–23. **Drive: 12 plays, 82 yards, 6:56.**
- NO – Zach Line 1-yard pass from Drew Brees (Wil Lutz kick), 9:59. Saints 30–29. **Drive: 8 plays, 75 yards, 4:12.**
- ATL – Mohamed Sanu 5-yard pass from Matt Ryan (Matt Ryan-Mohamed Sanu pass), 6:56. Falcons 37–30. **Drive: 5 plays, 75 yards, 3:01.**
- NO – Drew Brees 7-yard run (Wil Lutz kick), 1:15. Tied 37–37. **Drive: 11 plays, 81 yards, 5:43.**

**Overtime**

- NO – Drew Brees 1-yard run, 2:55. Saints 43–37. **Drive: 15 plays, 80 yards, 7:05.**

**Top passers**

- NO – Drew Brees – 39/49, 396 yards, 3 TD
- ATL – Matt Ryan – 26/35, 374 yards, 5 TD

**Top rushers**

- NO – Alvin Kamara – 16 carries, 66 yards
- ATL – Tevin Coleman – 15 carries, 33 yards

**Top receivers**

- NO – Alvin Kamara – 15 receptions, 124 yards
- ATL – Calvin Ridley – 7 receptions, 146 yards, 3 TD

==== Week 4: vs. Cincinnati Bengals ====
Week Four: Cincinnati Bengals at Atlanta Falcons – Game summary

Quarter	1	2	3	4	Total
**Bengals**	14	14	0	9	**37**
Falcons	7	17	3	9	**36**

at Mercedes-Benz Stadium, Atlanta, Georgia

- Date: September 30
- Game time: 1:00 p.m. EDT
- Game weather: Played indoors (retractable roof closed)
- Game attendance: 71,985
- Referee: Shawn Smith
- TV announcers (CBS): Greg Gumbel, Trent Green, Bruce Arians and Melanie Collins
- Recap, Gamebook

Game information

**First quarter**

- ATL – Ito Smith 7-yard run (Matt Bryant kick), 10:27. Falcons 7–0. **Drive: 8 plays, 50 yards, 4:43.**
- CIN – Tyler Eifert 15-yard pass from Andy Dalton (Randy Bullock kick), 7:23. Tied 7–7. **Drive: 5 plays, 67 yards, 3:04.**
- CIN – Giovani Bernard 10-yard run (Randy Bullock kick), 0:12. Bengals 14–7. **Drive: 8 plays, 51 yards, 3:29.**

**Second quarter**

- ATL – Logan Paulsen 17-yard pass from Matt Ryan (Matt Bryant kick), 11:03. Tied 14–14. **Drive 10 plays, 75 yards, 4:09.**
- CIN – John Ross 39-yard pass from Andy Dalton (Randy Bullock kick), Bengals 21–14. **Drive: 5 plays, 75 yards, 2:52.**
- ATL – Calvin Ridley 11-yard pass from Matt Ryan (Matt Bryant), 2:55. Tied 21–21. **Drive: 10 plays, 79 yards, 5:16.**
- CIN – Giovani Bernard 1-yard run (Randy Bullock kick), 0:44. Bengals 28–21. **Drive: 6 plays, 75 yards, 2:11.**
- ATL – Matt Bryant 55-yard field goal, 0:00. Bengals 28–24. **Drive: 7 plays, 38 yards, 0:44.**

**Third quarter**

- ATL – Matt Bryant 28-yard field goal, 11:22. Bengals 28–27. **Drive: 4 plays, -2 yards, 1:46.**

**Fourth quarter**

- ATL – Calvin Ridley 30-yard pass from Matt Ryan (Two-point conversion failed), 14:25. Falcons 33–28. **Drive: 4 plays, 54 yards, 2:13.**
- CIN – Randy Bullock 36-yard field goal, 8:19. Falcons 33–31. **Drive: 11 plays, 34 yards, 6:06.**
- ATL – Matt Bryant 32-yard field goal, 4:15. Falcons 36–31. **Drive: 11 plays, 61 yards, 4:04.**
- CIN A. J. Green 13-yard pass from Andy Dalton (Two-point conversion failed), 0:07. Bengals 37–36. **Drive: 16 plays, 75 yards, 4:08.**

**Top passers**

- CIN – Andy Dalton – 29/41, 337 yards, 3 TD, INT
- ATL – Matt Ryan – 29/39, 419 yards, 3 TD

**Top rushers**

- CIN – Giovani Bernard – 15 rushes, 69 yards, 2 TD
- ATL – Tevin Coleman – 14 rushes, 51 yards

**Top receivers**

- CIN – Tyler Boyd – 11 receptions, 100 yards
- ATL – Julio Jones – 9 receptions, 173 yards

==== Week 5: at Pittsburgh Steelers ====
Week Five: Atlanta Falcons at Pittsburgh Steelers – Game summary

Quarter	1	2	3	4	Total
Falcons	0	10	0	7	**17**
**Steelers**	13	0	14	14	**41**

at Heinz Field, Pittsburgh, Pennsylvania

- Date: October 7
- Game time: 1:00 p.m. EDT
- Game weather: 83 °F (28 °C), sunny
- Game attendance: 64,781
- Referee: John Parry
- TV announcers (Fox): Chris Myers, Daryl Johnston and Laura Okmin
- Recap, Gamebook

Game information

**First quarter**

- PIT – James Conner 1-yard run (kick failed), 10:44. Steelers 6–0. **Drive: 8 plays, 78 yards, 4:16.**
- PIT – JuJu Smith-Schuster 18-yard pass from Ben Roethlisberger (Chris Boswell kick), 0:37. Steelers 13–0. **Drive: 11 plays, 97 yards, 4:38.**

**Second quarter**

- ATL – Mohamed Sanu 43-yard pass from Matt Ryan (Matt Bryant kick), 11:21. Steelers 13–7. **Drive: 8 plays, 75 yards, 4:16.**
- ATL – Matt Bryant 47-yard field goal, 4:23. Steelers 13–10. **Drive: 13 plays, 50 yards, 5:56.**

**Third quarter**

- PIT – Antonio Brown 9-yard pass from Ben Roethlisberger (Chris Boswell kick), 3:42. Steelers 20–10. **Drive: 12 plays, 85 yards, 7:06.**
- PIT – James Conner 2-yard run (Chris Boswell kick), 1:39. Steelers 27–10. **Drive: 3 plays, 18 yards, 0:58.**

**Fourth quarter**

- ATL – Ito Smith 2-yard run (Matt Bryant kick), 12:28. Steelers 27–17. **Drive: 9 plays, 75 yards, 4:11.**
- PIT – Antonio Brown 47-yard pass from Ben Roethlisberger (Chris Boswell kick), 9:41. Steelers 34–17. **Drive: 5 plays, 75 yards, 2:47.**
- PIT – L. J. Fort fumble recovery in end zone (Chris Boswell kick), 3:35. Steelers 41–17.

**Top passers**

- ATL – Matt Ryan – 26/38, 285 yards, 1 TD
- PIT – Ben Roethlisberger – 19/29, 250 yards, 3 TD, 1 INT

**Top rushers**

- ATL – Devonta Freeman – 8 carries, 32 yards
- PIT – James Conner – 21 carries, 110 yards, 2 TD

**Top receivers**

- ATL – Austin Hooper – 9 receptions, 77 yards
- PIT – Antonio Brown – 6 receptions, 101 yards, 2 TD

==== Week 6: vs. Tampa Bay Buccaneers ====
Week Six: Tampa Bay Buccaneers at Atlanta Falcons – Game summary

Quarter	1	2	3	4	Total
Buccaneers	6	7	3	13	**29**
**Falcons**	7	17	0	10	**34**

at Mercedes-Benz Stadium, Atlanta, Georgia

- Date: October 14
- Game time: 1:00 p.m. EDT
- Game weather: 67 °F (19 °C), clear – retractable roof open
- Game attendance: 72,665
- Referee: Walt Coleman
- TV announcers (Fox): Thom Brennaman, Chris Spielman and Shannon Spake
- Recap, Gamebook

Game information

First quarter

- TB – Cameron Brate 15-yard pass from Jameis Winston (kick failed), 11:36. Buccaneers 6–0. **Drive: 8 plays, 75 yards, 3:24.**

Second quarter

- ATL – Mohamed Sanu 35-yard pass from Matt Ryan (Matt Bryant kick), 8:22. Falcons 7–6. **Drive: 6 plays, 75 yards, 3:14.**
- ATL – Ito Smith 14-yard run (Matt Bryant kick), 12:19. Falcons 14–6. **Drive: 14 plays, 86 yards, 7:23.**
- ATL – Austin Hooper 9-yard pass from Matt Ryan (Matt Bryant kick), 7:30. Falcons 21–6. **Drive: 7 plays, 58 yards, 3:13.**
- TB – O. J. Howard 10-yard pass from Jameis Winston (Chandler Catanzaro kick), 0:26. Falcons 21–13. **Drive: 7 plays, 52 yards, 2:55.**
- ATL – Matt Bryant 45-yard field goal, 0:01. Falcons 24–13. **Drive: 4 plays, 48 yards, 0:25.**

Third quarter

- TB – Chandler Catanzaro 35-yard field goal, 2:39. Falcons 24–16. **Drive: 7 plays, 43 yards, 4:08.**

Fourth quarter

- TB – Chris Godwin 9-yard pass from Jameis Winston (pass failed), 11:34. Falcons 24–22. **Drive: 7 plays, 85 yards, 3:45.**
- ATL – Tevin Coleman 6-yard pass from Matt Ryan (Matt Bryant kick), 6:28. Falcons 31–22. **Drive: 10 plays, 75 yards, 5:06.**
- TB – Peyton Barber 5-yard pass from Jameis Winston (Chandler Catanzaro kick), 3:47. Falcons 31–29. **Drive: 9 plays, 75 yards, 2:41.**

**Top passers**

- TB – Jameis Winston – 30/41, 395 yards, 4 TD, 2 INT
- ATL – Matt Ryan – 31/41, 355 yards, 3 TD

**Top rushers**

- TB – Peyton Barber – 13 carries, 82 yards
- ATL – Tevin Coleman – 10 carries, 35 yards

**Top receivers**

- TB – Chris Godwin – 6 receptions, 56 yards, 1 TD
- ATL – Julio Jones – 10 receptions, 144 yards

==== Week 7: vs. New York Giants ====
Week Seven: New York Giants at Atlanta Falcons – Game summary

Quarter	1	2	3	4	Total
Giants	0	3	3	14	**20**
**Falcons**	0	10	0	13	**23**

at Mercedes-Benz Stadium, Atlanta, Georgia

- Date: October 22
- Game time: 8:15 p.m. EDT
- Game weather: 60 °F (16 °C), clear – retractable roof open
- Game attendance: 72,756
- Referee: Tony Corrente
- TV announcers (ESPN): Joe Tessitore, Jason Witten, Booger McFarland and Lisa Salters
- Recap, Gamebook

Game information

First quarter

- No scoring plays.

Second quarter

- ATL – Marvin Hall 47-yard pass from Matt Ryan (Giorgio Tavecchio kick), 4:51. Falcons 7–0. **Drive: 3 plays, 86 yards, 1:01.**
- NYG – Aldrick Rosas 31-yard field goal, 0:50. Falcons 7–3. **Drive: 11 plays, 77 yards, 4:01.**
- ATL – Giorgio Tavecchio 40-yard field goal, 0:03. Falcons 10–3. **Drive: 6 plays, 53 yards, 0:47.**

Third quarter

- NYG – Aldrick Rosas 36-yard field goal, 3:51. Falcons 10–6. **Drive: 7 plays, 62 yards, 1:48.**

Fourth quarter

- ATL – Giorgio Tavecchio 50-yard field goal, 14:55. Falcons 13–6. **Drive: 7 plays, 43 yards, 3:56.**
- ATL – Tevin Coleman 30-yard run (Giorgio Tavecchio kick), 7:47. Falcons 20–6. **Drive: 9 plays, 65 yards, 5:14.**
- NYG – Saquon Barkley 2-yard run (kick failed), 4:47. Falcons 20–12. **Drive: 9 plays, 78 yards, 3:00.**
- ATL – Giorgio Tavecchio 56-yard field goal, 1:55. Falcons 23–12. **Drive: 8 plays, 37 yards, 2:52.**
- NYG – Odell Beckham Jr. 1-yard pass from Eli Manning (Saquon Barkley run), 0:05. Falcons 23–20. **Drive: 7 plays, 72 yards, 1:50.**

**Top passers**

- NYG – Eli Manning – 27/38, 399 yards, 1 TD
- ATL – Matt Ryan – 31/39, 379 yards, 1 TD

**Top rushers**

- NYG – Saquon Barkley – 14 carries, 43 yards, 1 TD
- ATL – Tevin Coleman – 11 carries, 50 yards, 1 TD

**Top receivers**

- NYG – Saquon Barkley – 9 receptions, 51 yards
- ATL – Julio Jones – 9 receptions, 104 yards

==== Week 9: at Washington Redskins ====
Week Nine: Atlanta Falcons at Washington Redskins – Game summary

Quarter	1	2	3	4	Total
**Falcons**	7	14	7	10	**38**
Redskins	0	7	7	0	**14**

at FedEx Field, Landover, Maryland

- Date: November 4
- Game time: 1:00 p.m. EST
- Game weather: 55 °F (13 °C), sunny
- Game attendance: 62,386
- Referee: Walt Anderson
- TV announcers (Fox): Kevin Burkhardt, Charles Davis and Pam Oliver
- Recap, Gamebook

Game information

**First quarter**

- ATL – Tevin Coleman 39-yard pass from Matt Ryan (Giorgio Tavecchio kick), 9:46. Falcons 7–0. **Drive: 7 plays, 81 yards, 3:04.**

**Second quarter**

- ATL – Ito Smith 12-yard run (Giorgio Tavecchio kick), 9:10. Falcons 14–0. **Drive: 9 plays, 68 yards, 4:19.**
- WAS – Josh Doctson 2-yard pass from Alex Smith (Dustin Hopkins kick), 3:10. Falcons 14–7. **Drive: 11 plays, 80 yards, 6:00.**
- ATL – Calvin Ridley 40-yard pass from Matt Ryan (Giorgio Tavecchio kick), 0:28. Falcons 21–7. **Drive: 7 plays, 75 yards, 2:42.**

**Third quarter**

- ATL – Tevin Coleman 10-yard pass from Matt Ryan (Giorgio Tavecchio kick), 9:58. Falcons 28–7. **Drive: 8 plays, 75 yards, 5:02.**
- WAS – Kapri Bibbs 3-yard run (Dustin Hopkins kick), 2:15. Falcons 28–14. **Drive: 9 plays, 77 yards, 3:42.**

**Fourth quarter**

- ATL – Giorgio Tavecchio 27-yard field goal, 7:09. Falcons 31–14. **Drive: 10 plays, 72 yards, 6:43.**
- ATL – Julio Jones 35-yard pass from Matt Ryan (Giorgio Tavecchio kick), 3:42. Falcons 38–14. **Drive: 6 plays, 56 yards, 3:16.**

**Top passers**

- ATL – Matt Ryan – 26/38, 250 yards, 4 TD, 1 INT
- WAS – Alex Smith – 30/46, 306 yards, 1 TD, 1 INT

**Top rushers**

- ATL – Tevin Coleman – 13 carries, 88 yards
- WAS – Alex Smith – 1 carries, 22 yards

**Top receivers**

- ATL – Julio Jones – 7 receptions, 121 yards, 1 TD
- WAS – Maurice Harris – 10 receptions, 124 yards

==== Week 10: at Cleveland Browns ====
Week Ten: Atlanta Falcons at Cleveland Browns – Game summary

Quarter	1	2	3	4	Total
Falcons	0	10	0	6	**16**
**Browns**	7	7	14	0	**28**

at FirstEnergy Stadium, Cleveland, Ohio

- Date: November 11
- Game time: 1:00 p.m. EST
- Game weather: 36 °F (2 °C), sunny
- Game attendance: 62,144
- Referee: Pete Morelli
- TV announcers (Fox): Kenny Albert, Ronde Barber and Sara Walsh
- Recap, Gamebook

Game information

**First quarter**

- CLE – Rashard Higgins 28-yard pass from Baker Mayfield (Greg Joseph kick), 4:36. Browns 7–0. **Drive: 8 plays, 88 yards, 4:55.**

**Second quarter**

- ATL – Giorgio Tavecchio 40-yard field goal, 12:18. Browns 7–3. **Drive: 14 plays, 53 yards, 7:18.**
- ATL – Julio Jones 1-yard pass from Matt Ryan (Giorgio Tavecchio kick), 5:04. Falcons 10–7. **Drive: 6 plays, 45 yards, 3:26.**
- CLE – Nick Chubb 13-yard pass from Baker Mayfield (Greg Joseph kick), 0:55. Browns 14–10. **Drive: 8 plays, 80 yards, 4:09.**

**Third quarter**

- CLE – Duke Johnson 11-yard pass from Baker Mayfield (Greg Joseph kick), 10:27. Browns 21–10. **Drive: 6 plays, 41 yards, 3:00.**
- CLE – Nick Chubb 92-yard run (Greg Joseph kick), 8:45. Browns 28–10. **Drive: 2 plays, 92 yards, 0:16.**

**Fourth quarter**

- ATL – Austin Hooper 3-yard pass from Matt Ryan (pass failed), 4:24. Browns 28–16. **Drive: 13 plays, 69 yards, 4:03.**

**Top passers**

- ATL – Matt Ryan – 38/52, 330 yards, 2 TD
- CLE – Baker Mayfield – 17/20, 216 yards, 3 TD

**Top rushers**

- ATL – Tevin Coleman – 11 carries, 44 yards
- CLE – Nick Chubb – 20 carries, 176 yards, TD

**Top receivers**

- ATL – Julio Jones – 7 receptions, 107 yards, TD
- CLE – Antonio Callaway – 2 receptions, 39 yards

==== Week 11: vs. Dallas Cowboys ====
Week Eleven: Dallas Cowboys at Atlanta Falcons – Game summary

Quarter	1	2	3	4	Total
**Cowboys**	3	0	3	16	**22**
Falcons	0	6	3	10	**19**

at Mercedes-Benz Stadium, Atlanta, Georgia

- Date: November 18
- Game time: 1:00 p.m. EST
- Game weather: 59 °F (15 °C), sunny – retractable roof open
- Game attendance: 74,447
- Referee: Craig Wrolstad
- TV announcers (Fox): Kevin Burkhardt, Charles Davis and Pam Oliver
- Recap, Gamebook

Game information

**First quarter**

- DAL – Brett Maher 21-yard field goal, 3:00. Cowboys 3–0. **Drive: 15 plays, 85 yards, 7:23.**

**Second quarter**

- ATL – Matt Bryant 41-yard field goal, 14:56. Tied 3–3. **Drive: 7 plays, 52 yards, 3:04.**
- ATL – Matt Bryant 45-yard field goal, 0:34. Falcons 6–3. **Drive: 10 plays, 33 yards, 4:13.**

**Third quarter**

- DAL – Brett Maher 50-yard field goal, 10:20. Tied 6–6. **Drive: 8 plays, 43 yards, 4:45.**
- ATL – Matt Bryant 53-yard field goal, 7:16. Falcons 9–6. **Drive: 7 plays, 47 yards, 3:03.**

**Fourth quarter**

- DAL – Dak Prescott 4-yard run (kick failed), 14:23. Cowboys 12–9. **Drive: 14 plays, 75 yards, 7:53.**
- DAL – Ezekiel Elliott 23-yard run (Brett Maher kick), 12:33. Cowboys 19–9. **Drive: 2 plays, 31 yards, 0:41.**
- ATL – Matt Bryant 21-yard field goal, 8:28. Cowboys 19–12. **Drive: 9 plays, 72 yards, 4:00.**
- ATL – Julio Jones 34-yard pass from Matt Ryan (Matt Bryant kick), 1:52. Tied 19–19. **Drive: 6 plays, 68 yards, 2:10.**
- DAL – Brett Maher 42-yard field goal, 0:00. Cowboys 22–19. **Drive: 10 plays, 51 yards, 1:52.**

**Top passers**

- DAL – Dak Prescott – 22/32, 208 yards
- ATL – Matt Ryan – 24/34, 291 yards, TD, INT

**Top rushers**

- DAL – Ezekiel Elliott – 23 rushes, 122 yards, TD
- ATL – Tevin Coleman – 8 rushes, 58 yards

**Top receivers**

- DAL – Ezekiel Elliott – 7 receptions, 79 yards
- ATL – Julio Jones – 6 receptions, 118 yards, TD

==== Week 12: at New Orleans Saints ====
NFL on Thanksgiving Day

Week Twelve: Atlanta Falcons at New Orleans Saints – Game summary

Quarter	1	2	3	4	Total
Falcons	3	0	7	7	**17**
**Saints**	7	10	7	7	**31**

at Mercedes-Benz Superdome, New Orleans, Louisiana

- Date: November 22
- Game time: 8:20 p.m. EST/7:20 p.m. CST
- Game weather: Played indoors (dome stadium)
- Game attendance: 73,017
- Referee: John Hussey
- TV announcers (NBC): Mike Tirico, Tony Dungy, Rodney Harrison and Michele Tafoya and Terry McAulay
- Recap, Gamebook

Game information

First quarter

- NO – Tommylee Lewis 28-yard pass from Drew Brees (Wil Lutz kick), 11:11. Saints 7–0. **Drive: 7 plays, 75 yards, 3:49.**
- ATL – Matt Bryant 32-yard field goal, 2:35. Saints 7–3. **Drive: 8 plays, 25 yards, 3:03.**

Second quarter

- NO – Wil Lutz 22-yard field goal, 9:09. Saints 10–3. **Drive: 15 plays, 81 yards, 8:26.**
- NO – Austin Carr 12-yard pass from Drew Brees (Wil Lutz kick), 3:20. Saints 17–3. **Drive: 7 plays, 42 yards, 4:10.**

Third quarter

- NO – Dan Arnold 25-yard pass from Drew Brees (Wil Lutz kick), 5:59. Saints 24–3. **Drive: 6 plays, 70 yards, 3:18.**
- ATL – Calvin Ridley 2-yard pass from Matt Ryan (Matt Bryant kick), 0:22. Saints 24–10. **Drive: 13 plays, 79 yards, 5:37.**

Fourth quarter

- NO – Keith Kirkwood 5-yard pass from Drew Brees (Wil Lutz kick), 9:27. Saints 31–10. **Drive: 5 plays, 22 yards, 3:00.**
- ATL – Tevin Coleman 4-yard pass from Matt Ryan (Matt Bryant kick), 1:51. Saints 31–17. **Drive: 7 plays, 59 yards, 1:48.**

**Top passers**

- ATL – Matt Ryan – 35/47, 377 yards, 2 TD, INT
- NO – Drew Brees – 15/22, 171 yards, 4 TD, INT

**Top rushers**

- ATL – Matt Ryan – 2 carries, 16 yards
- NO – Alvin Kamara – 14 carries, 89 yards

**Top receivers**

- ATL – Julio Jones – 11 receptions, 147 yards
- NO – Dan Arnold – 4 receptions, 48 yards, TD

==== Week 13: vs. Baltimore Ravens ====
Week Thirteen: Baltimore Ravens at Atlanta Falcons – Game summary

Quarter	1	2	3	4	Total
**Ravens**	7	3	6	10	**26**
Falcons	3	7	0	6	**16**

at Mercedes-Benz Stadium, Atlanta, Georgia

- Date: December 2
- Game time: 1:00 p.m. EST
- Game weather: 67 °F (19 °C), mostly cloudy – retractable roof open
- Game attendance: 72,262
- Referee: Brad Allen
- TV announcers (CBS): Jim Nantz, Tony Romo and Tracy Wolfson
- Recap, Gamebook

Game information

**First quarter**

- ATL – Matt Bryant 44-yard field goal, 9:32. Falcons 3–0. **Drive: 12 plays, 49 yards, 5:28.**
- BAL – Lamar Jackson 13-yard rush (Justin Tucker kick), 4:17. Ravens 7–3. **Drive: 9 plays, 75 yards, 5:15.**

**Second quarter**

- ATL – Vic Beasley 74-yard fumble return (Matt Bryant kick), 11:33. Falcons 10–7.
- BAL – Justin Tucker 41-yard field goal, 0:06. Tied 10–10. **Drive: 9 plays, 59 yards, 1:40.**

**Third quarter**

- BAL – Justin Tucker 21-yard field goal, 9:59. Ravens 13–10. **Drive: 10 plays, 72 yards, 5:01.**
- BAL – Justin Tucker 45-yard field goal, 0:31. Ravens 16–10. **Drive: 14 plays, 60 yards, 8:08.**

**Fourth quarter**

- BAL – Justin Tucker 47-yard field goal, 7:25. Ravens 19–10. **Drive: 13 plays, 55 yards, 6:38.**
- BAL – Tavon Young 12-yard fumble return (Justin Tucker kick), 7:16. Ravens 26–10.
- ATL – Austin Hooper 1-yard pass from Matt Ryan (pass failed), 4:18. Ravens 26–16. **Drive: 6 plays, 75 yards, 2:58.**

**Top passers**

- BAL – Lamar Jackson – 12/21, 125 yards
- ATL – Matt Ryan – 16/26, 131 yards, 1 TD

**Top rushers**

- BAL – Gus Edwards – 21 carries, 82 yards
- ATL – Ito Smith – 7 carries, 22 yards

**Top receivers**

- BAL – Mark Andrews – 3 receptions, 47 yards
- ATL – Austin Hooper – 5 receptions, 44 yards, 1 TD

The Falcons were the only NFC South team to lose to all of their AFC North opponents in 2018.

==== Week 14: at Green Bay Packers ====
Week Fourteen: Atlanta Falcons at Green Bay Packers – Game summary

Quarter	1	2	3	4	Total
Falcons	7	0	0	13	**20**
**Packers**	7	13	14	0	**34**

at Lambeau Field, Green Bay, Wisconsin

- Date: December 9
- Game time: 1:00 p.m. EST/12:00 p.m. CST
- Game weather: 25 °F (−4 °C), cloudy
- Game attendance: 77,329
- Referee: Walt Coleman
- TV announcers (Fox): Kevin Burkhardt, Charles Davis and Pam Oliver
- Recap, Gamebook

Game information

First quarter

- ATL – Julio Jones 16-yard pass from Matt Ryan (Matt Bryant kick), 11:43. Falcons 7–0. **Drive: 7 plays, 80 yards, 3:24.**
- GB – Davante Adams 7-yard pass from Aaron Rodgers (Mason Crosby kick), 7:16. Tied 7–7. **Drive: 9 plays, 69 yards, 4:25.**

Second quarter

- GB – Mason Crosby 50-yard field goal, 7:45. Packers 10–7. **Drive: 12 plays, 43 yards, 6:02.**
- GB – Bashaud Breeland 22-yard interception return (Mason Crosby kick), 6:08. Packers 17–7.
- GB – Mason Crosby 48-yard field goal, 0:03. Packers 20–7. **Drive: 10 plays, 43 yards, 2:45.**

Third quarter

- GB – Randall Cobb 24-yard pass from Aaron Rodgers (Mason Crosby kick), 12:49. Packers 27–7. **Drive: 6 plays, 47 yards, 2:16.**
- GB – Aaron Jones 29-yard run (Mason Crosby kick), 5:57. Packers 34–7. **Drive: 8 plays, 71 yards, 4:38.**

Fourth quarter

- ATL – Julio Jones 12-yard pass from Matt Ryan (Matt Bryant kick), 13:39. Packers 34–14. **Drive: 12 plays, 78 yards, 4:13.**
- ATL – Justin Hardy 19-yard pass from Matt Ryan, 0:18. Packers 34–20. **Drive: 10 plays, 54 yards, 2:23.**

Top passers

- ATL – Matt Ryan – 28/42, 262 yards, 3 TD, INT
- GB – Aaron Rodgers – 21/32, 196 yards, 2 TD

Top rushers

- ATL – Ito Smith – 11 carries, 60 yards
- GB – Aaron Jones – 17 carries, 78 yards, 2 TD

Top receivers

- ATL – Julio Jones – 8 receptions, 106 yards, 2 TD
- GB – Davante Adams – 7 receptions, 81 yards, TD

Matt Ryan eclipsed 4,000 yards, becoming the third quarterback in NFL history to reach 4,000 in at least eight consecutive seasons, joining Drew Brees (2006-2017) & Peyton Manning (2006-2014). Julio Jones eclipsed 1,400 yards and became the first player in NFL history to register five consecutive seasons with at least 1,400 yards.

==== Week 15: vs. Arizona Cardinals ====
Week Fifteen: Arizona Cardinals at Atlanta Falcons – Game summary

Quarter	1	2	3	4	Total
Cardinals	7	0	0	7	**14**
**Falcons**	10	16	7	7	**40**

at Mercedes-Benz Stadium, Atlanta, Georgia

- Date: December 16
- Game time: 1:00 p.m. EST
- Game weather: Played indoors (retractable roof closed)
- Game attendance: 72,084
- Referee: Shawn Smith
- TV announcers (Fox): Kenny Albert, Ronde Barber and Sara Walsh
- Recap, Gamebook

Game information

**First quarter**

- ARI – David Johnson 1-yard rush (Zane Gonzalez kick), 8:25. Cardinals 7–0. **Drive: 8 plays, 64 yards, 3:22.**
- ATL – Deion Jones 41-yard interception return (Matt Bryant kick), 6:11. Tied 7–7.
- ATL – Matt Bryant 22-yard field goal, 0:37. Falcons 10–7. **Drive: 5 plays, 69 yards, 2:15.**

**Second quarter**

- ATL – Matt Ryan 1-yard rush (Matt Bryant kick), 12:32. Falcons 17–7. **Drive: 5 plays, 34 yards, 1:37.**
- ATL – Matt Bryant 33-yard field goal, 5:16. Falcons 20–7. **Drive: 11 plays, 65 yards, 5:03.**
- ATL – Julio Jones 21-yard pass from Matt Ryan (pass failed), 0:13. Falcons 26–7. **Drive: 6 plays, 71 yards, 0:57.**

**Third quarter**

- ATL – Tevin Coleman 43-yard rush (Matt Bryant kick), 5:39. Falcons 33–7. **Drive: 4 plays, 72 yards, 1:53.**

**Fourth quarter**

- ATL – Justin Hardy 5-yard pass from Matt Ryan (Matt Bryant kick), 11:14. Falcons 40–7. **Drive: 12 plays, 76 yards, 6:32.**
- ARI – Trent Sherfield 7-yard pass from Mike Glennon (Zane Gonzalez kick), 3:14. Falcons 40–14. **Drive: 13 plays, 64 yards, 3:50.**

**Top passers**

- ARI – Josh Rosen – 13/22, 132 yards, 2 INT
- ATL – Matt Ryan – 22/36, 231 yards, 2 TD

**Top rushers**

- ARI – David Johnson – 11 carries, 33 yards, 1 TD
- ATL – Tevin Coleman – 11 carries, 145 yards, 1 TD

**Top receivers**

- ARI – Larry Fitzgerald – 7 receptions, 82 yards
- ATL – Julio Jones – 6 receptions, 82 yards, 1 TD

Despite this win, Minnesota's win to Miami eliminated the Falcons from post-season contention and once again assures that the Super Bowl host team will not play the championship game on their own field.

==== Week 16: at Carolina Panthers ====
Week Sixteen: Atlanta Falcons at Carolina Panthers – Game summary

Quarter	1	2	3	4	Total
**Falcons**	7	3	14	0	**24**
Panthers	7	3	0	0	**10**

at Bank of America Stadium, Charlotte, North Carolina

- Date: December 23
- Game time: 1:00 p.m. EST
- Game weather: 52 °F (11 °C), sunny
- Game attendance: 73,722
- Referee: Pete Morelli
- TV announcers (Fox): Dick Stockton, Mark Schlereth and Jennifer Hale
- Recap, Gamebook

Game information

**First quarter**

- CAR – Ian Thomas 1-yard pass from Taylor Heinicke (Chandler Catanzaro kick), 7:05. Panthers 7–0. **Drive: 14 plays, 73 yards, 8:03.**
- ATL – Julio Jones 1-yard pass from Matt Ryan (Matt Bryant kick), 0:44. Tied 7–7. **Drive: 13 plays, 85 yards, 6:19.**

**Second quarter**

- CAR – Chandler Catanzaro 50-yard field goal, 7:46. Panthers 10–7. **Drive: 9 plays, 46 yards, 5:22.**
- ATL – Matt Bryant 39-yard field goal, 5:35. Tied 10–10. **Drive: 6 plays, 55 yards, 2:09.**

**Third quarter**

- ATL – Calvin Ridley 75-yard pass from Matt Ryan (Matt Bryant kick), 14:51. Falcons 17-10. **Drive: 1 play, 75 yards, 0:09.**
- ATL – Mohamed Sanu 44-yard pass from Matt Ryan (Matt Bryant kick), 4:45. Falcons 24-10. **Drive: 7 plays, 85 yards, 4:06.**

**Fourth quarter**

- No scoring plays.

**Top passers**

- ATL – Matt Ryan – 15/26, 239 yards, 3 TD
- CAR – Taylor Heinicke – 33/53, 274 yards, TD, 3 INT

**Top rushers**

- ATL – Brian Hill – 8 rushes, 115 yards
- CAR – Christian McCaffrey – 21 rushes, 101 yards

**Top receivers**

- ATL – Calvin Ridley – 3 receptions, 90 yards, TD
- CAR – Christian McCaffrey – 12 receptions, 77 yards

==== Week 17: at Tampa Bay Buccaneers ====
Week Seventeen: Atlanta Falcons at Tampa Bay Buccaneers – Game summary

Quarter	1	2	3	4	Total
**Falcons**	0	7	17	10	**34**
Buccaneers	7	10	3	12	**32**

at Raymond James Stadium, Tampa, Florida

- Date: December 30
- Game time: 1:00 p.m. EST
- Game weather: 80 °F (27 °C), cloudy
- Game attendance: 52,884
- Referee: Brad Allen
- TV announcers (Fox): Dick Stockton, Mark Schlereth and Jennifer Hale
- Recap, Gamebook

Game information

First quarter

- TB – Mike Evans 19-yard pass from Jameis Winston (Cairo Santos kick), 3:48. Buccaneers 7–0. **Drive: 12 plays, 93 yards, 6:28.**

Second quarter

- TB – Cairo Santos 36-yard field goal, 8:25. Buccaneers 10–0. **Drive: 9 plays, 35 yards, 4:16.**
- TB – Chris Godwin 30-yard pass from Jameis Winston (Cairo Santos kick), 0:46. Buccaneers 17–0. **Drive: 4 plays, 70 yards, 0:56.**
- ATL – Julio Jones 19-yard pass from Matt Ryan (Matt Bryant kick), 0:20. Buccaneers 17–7. **Drive: 5 plays, 75 yards, 0:26.**

Third quarter

- ATL – Matt Ryan 5-yard pass from Mohamed Sanu (Matt Bryant kick), 8:49. Buccaneers 17–14. **Drive: 14 plays, 75 yards, 6:11.**
- TB – Cairo Santos 45-yard field goal, 6:39. Buccaneers 20–14. **Drive: 6 plays, 48 yards, 2:10.**
- ATL – Matt Bryant 49-yard field goal, 1:59. Buccaneers 20–17. **Drive: 10 plays, 42 yards, 4:40.**
- ATL – Tevin Coleman 23-yard rush (Matt Bryant kick), 0:44. Falcons 24–20. **Drive: 3 plays, 43 yards, 0:35.**

Fourth quarter

- ATL – Calvin Ridley 7-yard pass from Matt Ryan (Matt Bryant kick), 10:51. Falcons 31–20. **Drive: 7 plays, 75 yards, 3:59.**
- TB – Mike Evans 10-yard pass from Jameis Winston (pass failed), 8:09. Falcons 31–26. **Drive: 6 plays, 75 yards, 2:42.**
- TB – Chris Godwin 19-yard pass from Jameis Winston (pass failed), 5:10. Buccaneers 32–31. **Drive: 2 plays, 34 yards, 0:44.**
- ATL – Matt Bryant 37-yard field goal, 0:00. Falcons 34–32. **Drive: 13 plays, 56 yards, 5:10.**

**Top passers**

- ATL – Matt Ryan – 31/44, 378 yards, 2 TD, 1 INT
- TB – Jameis Winston – 22/35, 345 yards, 4 TD, 1 INT

**Top rushers**

- ATL – Tevin Coleman – 8 carries, 45 yards, 1 TD
- TB – Peyton Barber – 15 carries, 66 yards

**Top receivers**

- ATL – Julio Jones – 9 receptions, 138 yards, TD
- TB – Chris Godwin – 6 receptions, 114 yards, 2 TD

=== Standings ===
==== Division ====
NFC South
	W	L	T	PCT	DIV	CONF	PF	PA	STK
^{(1)} New Orleans Saints	13	3	0	.813	4–2	9–3	504	353	L1
Atlanta Falcons	7	9	0	.438	4–2	7–5	414	423	W3
Carolina Panthers	7	9	0	.438	2–4	5–7	376	382	W1
Tampa Bay Buccaneers	5	11	0	.313	2–4	4–8	396	464	L4

==== Conference ====
NFC
#	Team	Division	W	L	T	PCT	DIV	CONF	SOS	SOV	STK
**Division leaders**
1 (Note: New Orleans finished ahead of LA Rams based on head-to-head victory, claiming the No. 1 seed.)	New Orleans Saints	South	13	3	0	.813	4–2	9–3	.482	.488	L1
2	Los Angeles Rams	West	13	3	0	.813	6–0	9–3	.480	.428	W2
3	Chicago Bears	North	12	4	0	.750	5–1	10–2	.430	.419	W4
4	Dallas Cowboys	East	10	6	0	.625	5–1	9–3	.488	.444	W2
**Wild Cards**
5	Seattle Seahawks	West	10	6	0	.625	3–3	8–4	.484	.400	W2
6	Philadelphia Eagles	East	9	7	0	.563	4–2	6–6	.518	.486	W3
**Did not qualify for the postseason**
7	Minnesota Vikings	North	8	7	1	.531	3–2–1	6–5–1	.504	.355	L1
8 (Note: Atlanta finished ahead of Washington based on head-to-head victory. Atlanta finished ahead of Carolina based on head-to-head sweep. Washington finished ahead of Carolina based on head-to-head victory.)	Atlanta Falcons	South	7	9	0	.438	4–2	7–5	.482	.348	W3
9	Washington Redskins	East	7	9	0	.438	2–4	6–6	.486	.371	L2
10	Carolina Panthers	South	7	9	0	.438	2–4	5–7	.508	.518	W1
11	Green Bay Packers	North	6	9	1	.406	1–4–1	3–8–1	.488	.417	L1
12	Detroit Lions	North	6	10	0	.375	2–4	4–8	.504	.427	W1
13 (Note: NY Giants finished ahead of Tampa Bay based on head-to-head victory.)	New York Giants	East	5	11	0	.313	1–5	4–8	.527	.487	L3
14	Tampa Bay Buccaneers	South	5	11	0	.313	2–4	4–8	.523	.506	L4
15	San Francisco 49ers	West	4	12	0	.250	1–5	2–10	.504	.406	L2
16	Arizona Cardinals	West	3	13	0	.188	2–4	3–9	.527	.302	L4
**Tiebreakers** (Note: When breaking ties for three or more teams under the NFL's rules, they are first broken within divisions, then comparing only the highest-ranked remaining team from each division.)
