= Logan Paulsen =

American football player and analyst (born 1987)

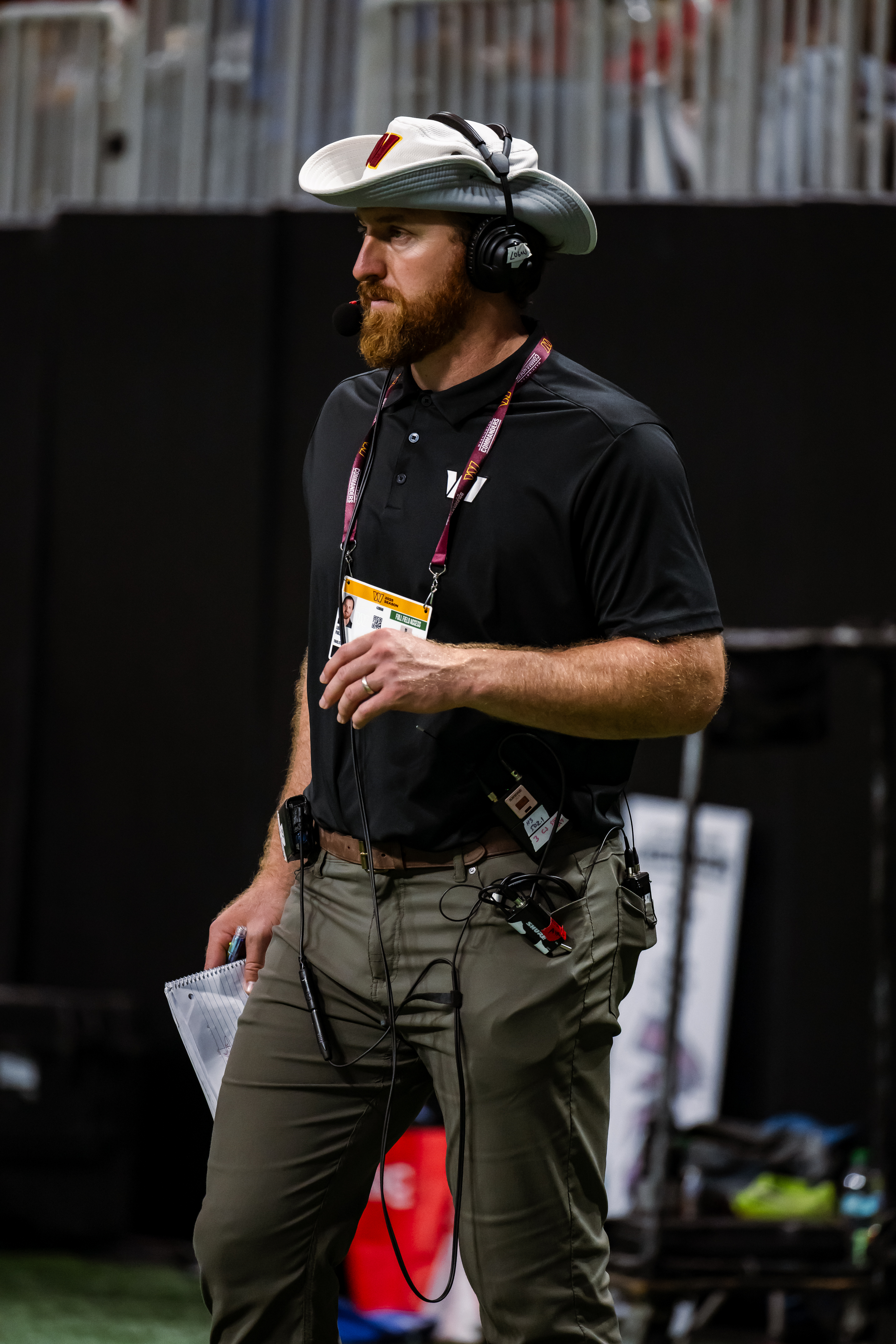
- Paulsen in 2025

No. 82
- Position: Tight end

Personal information
- Born: February 26, 1987 (age 39); Northridge, California, U.S.
- Listed height: 6 ft 5 in (1.96 m)
- Listed weight: 268 lb (122 kg)

Career information
- High school: Chaminade College Prep (Los Angeles)
- College: UCLA (2005–2009)
- NFL draft: 2010: undrafted

Career history
- Washington Redskins (2010–2015); Chicago Bears (2016); San Francisco 49ers (2017); Atlanta Falcons (2018); Houston Texans (2019)

Career NFL statistics
- Receptions: 91
- Receiving yards: 907
- Receiving touchdowns: 7
- Stats at Pro Football Reference

Logan Sindre Paulsen (born February 26, 1987) is an American professional football analyst and former tight end. He played college football for the UCLA Bruins and signed with the Washington Redskins as an undrafted free agent in 2010. Paulsen also played for the Chicago Bears, San Francisco 49ers, Atlanta Falcons, and Houston Texans. He now works as an analyst for the Washington Commanders media and radio team.

== Professional career ==
Pre-draft measurables
Height	Weight	40-yard dash	10-yard split	20-yard split	20-yard shuttle	Three-cone drill	Vertical jump	Broad jump	Bench press
6 ft 4 1/4 in (1.94 m)	265 lb (120 kg)	4.89 s	1.73 s	2.86 s	4.52 s	7.36 s	27.5 in (0.70 m)	8 ft 11 in (2.72 m)	25 reps
All values from Pro Day

=== Washington Redskins ===
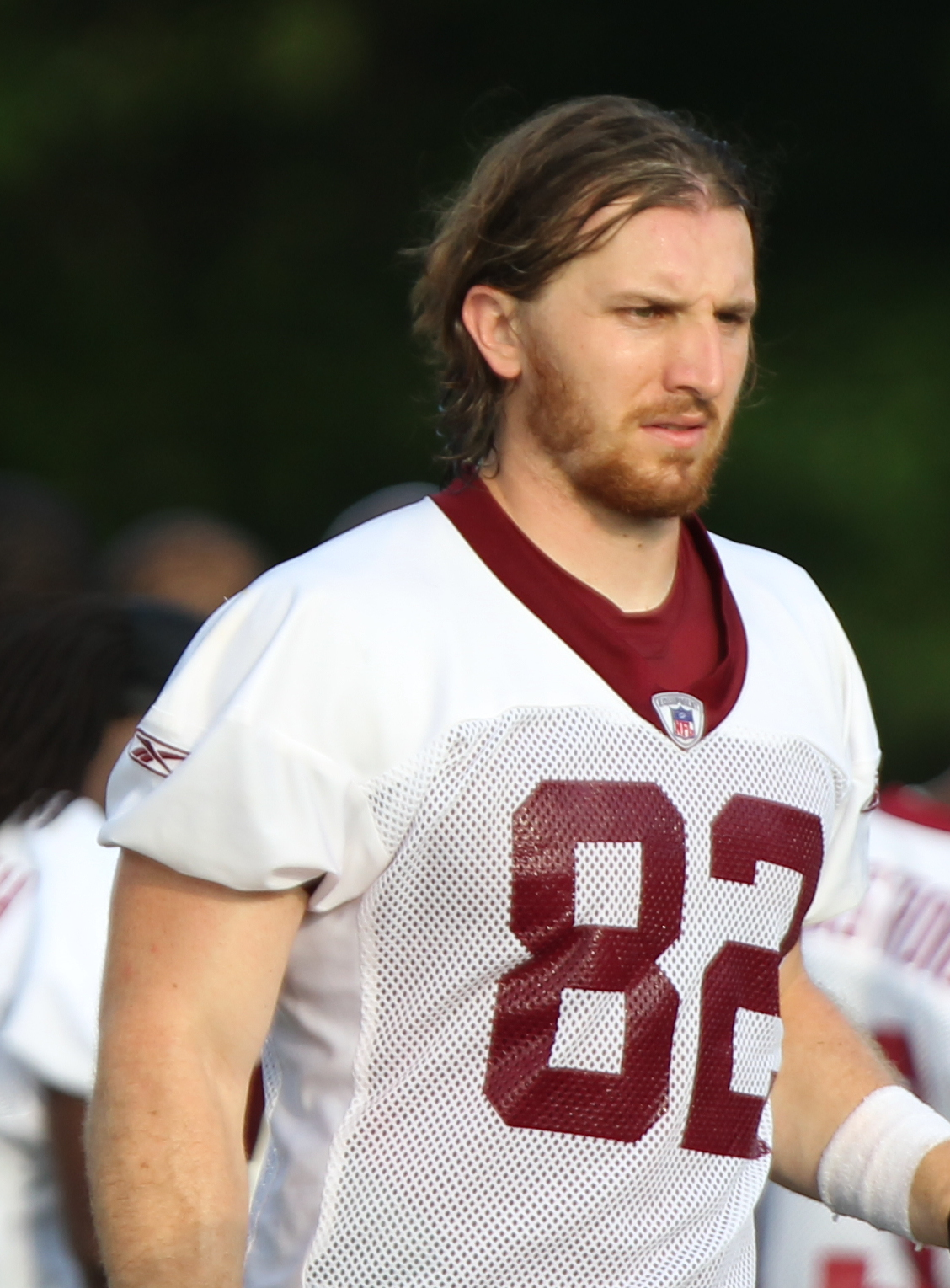
Paulsen with the Washington Redskins in 2011

Paulsen was signed by the Washington Redskins as an undrafted free agent following the 2010 NFL draft. He was made the third-string tight end behind Chris Cooley and Fred Davis. Paulsen made his NFL debut in Week 3 against the St. Louis Rams. He scored his first career touchdown against the Tampa Bay Buccaneers on December 12, 2010, on a one-yard pass from Donovan McNabb. At the end of the 2010 season, Paulsen played 11 games and recorded two receptions for 10 yards total and one touchdown.

During the 2011 season, against the Carolina Panthers, Paulsen caught two passes for 48 yards. Late in the season, Paulsen was made the starting tight end with Cooley on injured reserve and Davis suspended. Playing 16 games, starting six of them, Paulsen recorded 11 receptions and 138 receiving yards at the end of the season.

By the start of the 2012 season, Paulsen was once again named the third-string tight end behind Fred Davis and Niles Paul. In the Week 7 game against the New York Giants, he had the best offensive performance in his career subbing in for Davis after the former tore his Achilles tendon early in the first half. He would score his second career touchdown in the Week 11 win against the Philadelphia Eagles.

Set to be a free agent in the 2013 season, Paulsen re-signed with the Redskins to a $4 million, three-year contract with another $3 million in incentives, on March 9, 2013.

After it was announced that Paulsen would miss the entire 2015 season due to needing toe surgery, the Redskins placed him on injured reserve on August 16, 2015.

On March 11, 2016, Paulsen re-signed with the Redskins on a one-year contract. On September 3, 2016, Paulsen was released by the Redskins.

=== Chicago Bears ===
On September 4, 2016, the Chicago Bears signed Paulsen to their active 53-man roster.

=== San Francisco 49ers ===
On March 9, 2017, Paulsen signed a one-year contract with the San Francisco 49ers. He was released on October 17, but was re-signed two days later. On October 24, Paulsen was again released by the 49ers. He was re-signed yet again on November 6.

=== Atlanta Falcons ===
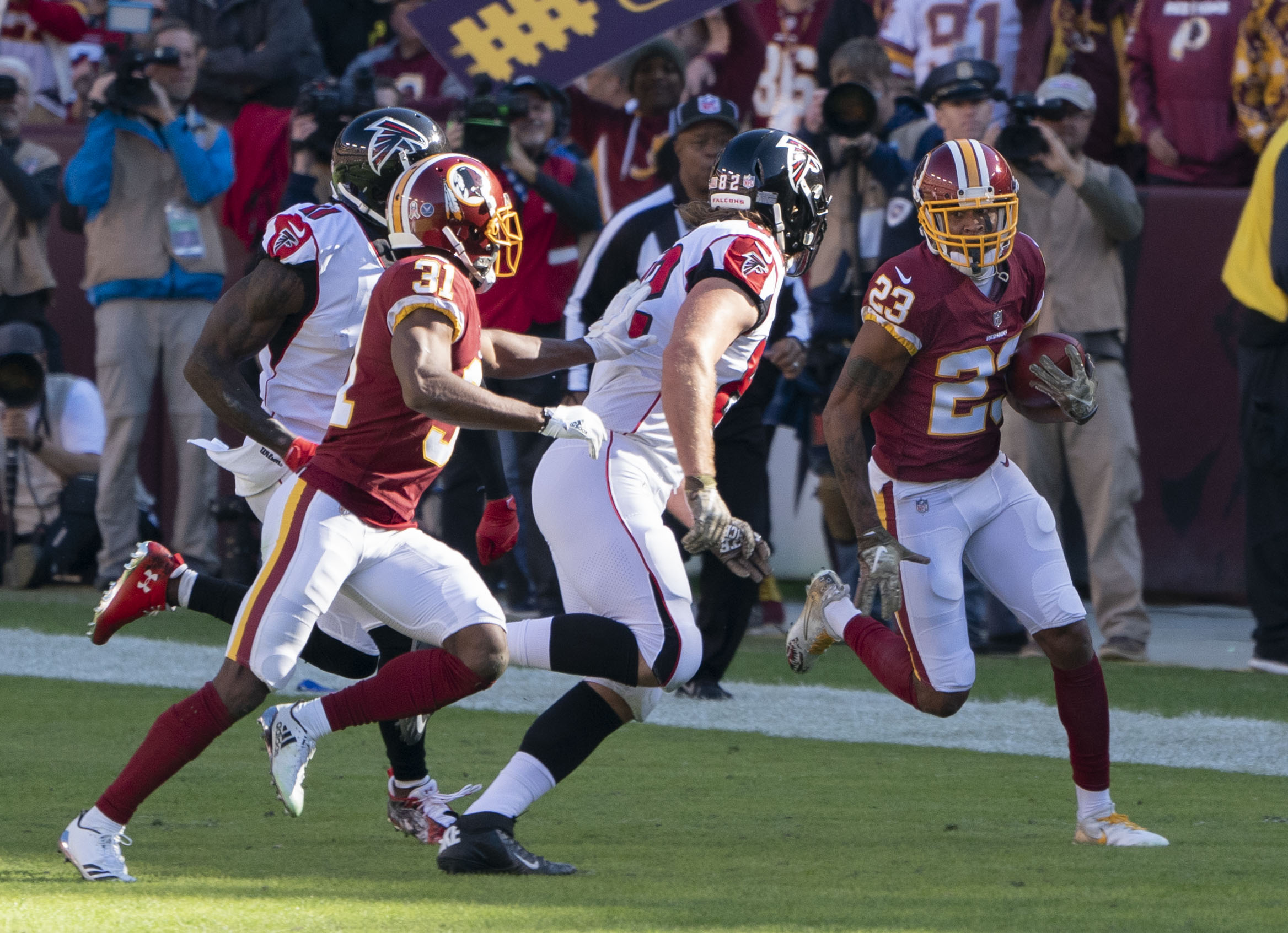
Paulsen (center) playing against the Washington Redskins in 2018.

On March 21, 2018, Paulsen signed a one-year contract with the Atlanta Falcons. In Week 4, in a 37–36 loss to the Cincinnati Bengals, he scored his first receiving touchdown as a Falcon and his first overall since the 2014 season.

On March 16, 2019, Paulsen re-signed with the Falcons. He was released by Atlanta on August 30.

=== Houston Texans ===
On September 2, 2019, Paulsen signed with the Houston Texans. On October 22, the Texans released Paulsen.

== Media Career ==
Paulsen is currently an analyst for the Washington Commanders featured weekly on "Command Center" also starting former Washington players such as Fred Smoot, Santana Moss, London Fletcher, and Brian Mitchell. He is also well known for his success in podcasting being a recurring talent for "Command Center Podcast" which was nominated for multiple People's Choice Podcast Awards including Best Sports Podcast and Best Overall Podcast in 2024 and 2025.
