= 2017 Tampa Bay Buccaneers season =

NFL team season

- Owner: The Glazer family
- General manager: Jason Licht
- Head coach: Dirk Koetter
- Home stadium: Raymond James Stadium

Results
- Record: 5–11
- Division place: 4th NFC South
- Playoffs: Did not qualify
- Pro Bowlers: LB Kwon Alexander; DT Gerald McCoy

Uniform
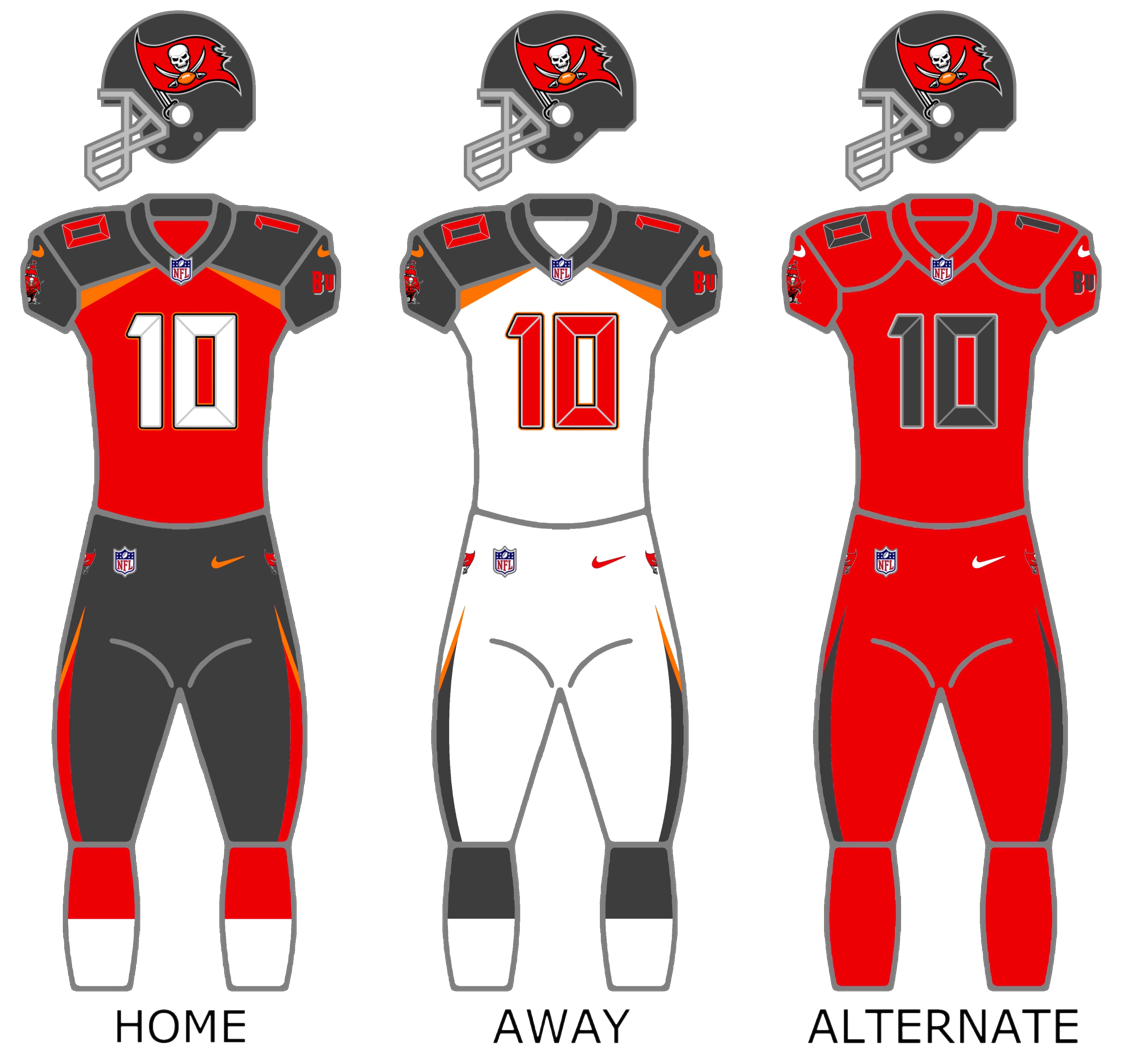

The 2017 season was the Tampa Bay Buccaneers' 42nd in the National Football League (NFL), their fourth under the leadership of general manager Jason Licht, the 20th playing their home games at Raymond James Stadium and the second under head coach Dirk Koetter.

On March 9, 2017, the Buccaneers signed former Washington Redskins wide receiver DeSean Jackson, defensive tackle Chris Baker, former Dallas Cowboys safety J. J. Wilcox (traded to Pittsburgh Steelers), former New York Jets kicker Nick Folk, and veteran quarterback Ryan Fitzpatrick.

The team's Week 1 game against the Miami Dolphins was rescheduled to November 19 due to Hurricane Irma. Week 11 was originally the two teams' bye week. Week 1 would become the bye week for both teams and they would not play until Week 2. This was first time since the Arizona Cardinals in 2001 in which a team had a bye week in Week 1.

The Buccaneers were hampered with poor performance and an early kicking situation, as they failed to improve or match their 9–7 record from the previous season. After a loss to the Detroit Lions on December 10, 2017, they were mathematically eliminated from the playoffs with a 4–9 record. The Bucs finished the season 5–11. This was their tenth consecutive season without a playoff appearance, with their last being in the 2007 season. Also, the Bucs finished last in the NFC South for the seventh time in nine seasons.

The preseason was documented on HBO's Hard Knocks.

== Offseason ==
=== Signings ===
Position	Player	Age	2016 Team	Contract
WR	DeSean Jackson	30	Washington Redskins	3 years, $33.5 million
DE	Chris Baker	29	Washington Redskins	3 years, $15.7 million
FS	J.J. Wilcox	28	Dallas Cowboys	2 years, $6.2 million
C	Joe Hawley	28	Tampa Bay Buccaneers	2 years, $5.5 million
CB	Josh Robinson	26	Tampa Bay Buccaneers	2 years, $5 million
FS	Chris Conte	28	Tampa Bay Buccaneers	2 years, $5 million
RB	Jacquizz Rodgers	27	Tampa Bay Buccaneers	2 years, $3.3 million
K	Nick Folk	32	New York Jets	1 year, $1.7 million
DT	Sealver Siliga	28	Tampa Bay Buccaneers	1 year, $1.1 million
LS	Garrison Sanborn	31	Buffalo Bills	1 year, $950,000

=== Departures ===
Position	Player	Age	2017 Team
QB	Mike Glennon	27	Chicago Bears
WR	Russell Shepard	26	Carolina Panthers
DT	Akeem Spence	25	Detroit Lions
FS	Bradley McDougald	26	Seattle Seahawks
LB	Daryl Smith	35	Retired
CB	Alterraun Verner	28	Miami Dolphins
WR	Cecil Shorts	29	Retired
WR	Vincent Jackson	34	Retired
OT	Gosder Cherilus	32	Retired

==== Acquisitions ====
The first transactions of the year occurred shortly after the conclusion of the 2016 regular season on January 2, 2017, when the Buccaneers signed center Josh Allen, safety Isaiah Johnson, guard Mike Liedtke, cornerback Cody Riggs, running back Blake Sims, and tight end Tevin Westbrook to reserve/futures contracts.

On January 4, the Bucs signed tight end Kivon Cartwright and kicker John Lunsford to reserve/futures contracts. On January 5, the Bucs signed Edmonton Eskimos wide receiver Derel Walker, Saskatchewan Roughriders Jeff Knox Jr and guard Jarvis Harrison.

On September 3, the club signed T. J. Ward, previously with Denver, for a one-year deal worth $5 million.

== 2017 NFL draft ==
=== Draft ===
2017 Tampa Bay Buccaneers draft
Round	Selection	Player	Position	College
1	19	O.J. Howard	TE	Alabama
2	50	Justin Evans	S	Texas A&M
3	84	Chris Godwin	WR	Penn State
3	107	Kendell Beckwith	LB	LSU
5	162	Jeremy McNichols	RB	Boise State
7	223	Stevie Tu'ikolovatu	DT	USC

== Staff ==
2017 Tampa Bay Buccaneers staff
Front office: Owner/president – Estate of Malcolm Glazer; Co-chairman – Bryan Glazer; Co-chairman – Edward Glazer; Co-chairman – Joel Glazer; General manager – Jason Licht; Director of player personnel – John Spytek; Director of football operations – Shelton Quarles; Director of college scouting – Mike Biehl; Director of pro scouting – Rob McCartney; Director of football administration – Mike Greenberg; Head coaches: Head coach – Dirk Koetter; Assistant to head coach – Anthony Perkins; Offensive coaches: Offensive coordinator/wide receivers – Todd Monken; Quarterbacks – Mike Bajakian; Running backs – Tim Spencer; Tight ends – Ben Steele; Offensive line/run game coordinator – George Warhop; Assistant offensive line – Butch Barry; Offensive quality control – Zack Grossi; Offensive assistant – Skyler Fulton	Defensive coaches: Defensive coordinator – Mike Smith; Defensive line – Jay Hayes; Assistant defensive line – Paul Spicer; Linebackers – Mark Duffner; Secondary – Jon Hoke; Defensive backs – Chad Carson; Defensive quality control – Dave Borgonzi; Defensive assistant – Danny Breyer; Special teams coaches: Special teams coordinator – Nate Kaczor; Assistant special teams – Carlos Polk; Strength and conditioning: Head strength and conditioning – Dave Kennedy; Assistant strength and conditioning – Joe Vaughn; Assistant strength and conditioning – Chad Wade

== Final roster ==
2017 Tampa Bay Buccaneers roster
Quarterbacks (QB): 14 Ryan Fitzpatrick; 4 Ryan Griffin; 3 Jameis Winston; Running backs (RB): 25 Peyton Barber; 22 Doug Martin; 32 Jacquizz Rodgers; 34 Charles Sims; Wide receivers (WR): 13 Mike Evans; 12 Chris Godwin; 10 Adam Humphries; 11 DeSean Jackson; 16 Freddie Martino; 85 Bobo Wilson; Tight ends (TE): 82 Antony Auclair; 84 Cameron Brate; 45 Alan Cross	Offensive linemen (OL): 77 Caleb Benenoch T; 72 Adam Gettis G; 68 Joe Hawley C; 67 Michael Liedtke G; 64 Kevin Pamphile G; 76 Donovan Smith T; 62 Evan Smith G; 66 Leonard Wester T; Defensive linemen (DL): 91 Robert Ayers DE; 90 Chris Baker DT; 94 Will Clarke DE; 92 William Gholston DE; 93 Gerald McCoy DT; 98 Clinton McDonald DT; 79 Pat O'Connor DE; 95 Ryan Russell DE; 96 Sealver Siliga DT; 71 Channing Ward DT	Linebackers (LB): 58 Kwon Alexander MLB; 51 Kendell Beckwith MLB; 59 Devante Bond OLB; 49 Riley Bullough OLB; 54 Lavonte David OLB; 52 Nigel Harris OLB; Defensive backs (DB): 23 Chris Conte SS; 35 Javien Elliott CB; 24 Brent Grimes CB; 39 Isaiah Johnson FS; 36 Robert McClain CB; 27 David Rivers CB; 26 Josh Robinson FS; 29 Ryan Smith CB; 37 Keith Tandy SS; 43 T. J. Ward FS; Special teams (ST): 9 Bryan Anger P; 7 Patrick Murray K; 65 Garrison Sanborn LS	Practice squad: 61 Sterling Bailey DE; 30 Maurice Fleming CB; 70 Patrick Gamble DE; 46 Austin Johnson FB; 89 Jake Lampman WR; 15 Devin Lucien WR; 46 Eric Nzeocha LB (IPP); 78 Givens Price T; 31 Cody Riggs CB; 60 Brad Seaton T; 56 Avery Young G; Reserve: 38 Jude Adjei-Barimah CB (IR); 69 Demar Dotson RT (IR); 21 Justin Evans FS (IR); 2 Nick Folk K (IR); 53 Adarius Glanton OLB (IR); 28 Vernon Hargreaves CB (IR); 80 O. J. Howard TE (IR); 75 DaVonte Lambert DT (IR); 74 Ali Marpet C (IR); 57 Noah Spence DE (IR); 73 J. R. Sweezy G (IR); -- Justin Trattou DE (IR); 97 Stevie Tu'ikolovatu DT (IR); Rookies in italics 53 active, 13 reserve, 11 practice squad

== Preseason ==
Week	Date	Opponent	Result	Record	Venue	Recap
1	August 11	at Cincinnati Bengals	L 12–23	0–1	Paul Brown Stadium	Recap
2	August 17	at Jacksonville Jaguars	W 12–8	1–1	EverBank Field	Recap
3	August 26	Cleveland Browns	L 9–13	1–2	Raymond James Stadium	Recap
4	August 31	Washington Redskins	L 10–13	1–3	Raymond James Stadium	Recap

== Regular season ==
=== Schedule ===
Week	Date	Opponent	Result	Record	Venue	Recap
1	Bye (Note: The Buccaneers were originally scheduled to play the Miami Dolphins during Week 1 (September 10) at Hard Rock Stadium in Miami Gardens. However, due to the impact from Hurricane Irma, the game was re-scheduled to Week 11, in which both the Buccaneers and Dolphins would originally have had their byes.)					
2	September 17	Chicago Bears	**W** 29–7	1–0	Raymond James Stadium	Recap
3	September 24	at Minnesota Vikings	**L** 17–34	1–1	U.S. Bank Stadium	Recap
4	October 1	New York Giants	**W** 25–23	2–1	Raymond James Stadium	Recap
5	October 5	New England Patriots	**L** 14–19	2–2	Raymond James Stadium	Recap
6	October 15	at Arizona Cardinals	**L** 33–38	2–3	University of Phoenix Stadium	Recap
7	October 22	at Buffalo Bills	**L** 27–30	2–4	New Era Field	Recap
8	October 29	**Carolina Panthers**	**L** 3–17	2–5	Raymond James Stadium	Recap
9	November 5	at **New Orleans Saints**	**L** 10–30	2–6	Mercedes-Benz Superdome	Recap
10	November 12	New York Jets	**W** 15–10	3–6	Raymond James Stadium	Recap
11	November 19	at Miami Dolphins	**W** 30–20	4–6	Hard Rock Stadium	Recap
12	November 26	at **Atlanta Falcons**	**L** 20–34	4–7	Mercedes-Benz Stadium	Recap
13	December 3	at Green Bay Packers	**L** 20–26 (OT)	4–8	Lambeau Field	Recap
14	December 10	Detroit Lions	**L** 21–24	4–9	Raymond James Stadium	Recap
15	December 18	**Atlanta Falcons**	**L** 21–24	4–10	Raymond James Stadium	Recap
16	December 24	at **Carolina Panthers**	**L** 19–22	4–11	Bank of America Stadium	Recap
17	December 31	**New Orleans Saints**	**W** 31–24	5–11	Raymond James Stadium	Recap

Note: Intra-division opponents are in bold text.

=== Game summaries ===
==== Week 2: vs. Chicago Bears ====
Week Two: Chicago Bears at Tampa Bay Buccaneers – Game summary

Quarter	1	2	3	4	Total
Bears	0	0	0	7	**7**
**Buccaneers**	10	16	0	3	**29**

at Raymond James Stadium, Tampa, Florida

- Date: September 17
- Game time: 1:00 p.m. EDT
- Game weather: 88 °F (31 °C), clear
- Game attendance: 56,640
- Referee: Ronald Torbert
- TV announcers (Fox): Dick Stockton, Mark Schlereth and Shannon Spake
- Recap, Gamebook

Game information

**First quarter**

- TB – Nick Folk 42-yard field goal, 9:02. Buccaneers 3–0 **Drive 13 plays, 56 yards, 6:02.**
- TB – Mike Evans 13-yard pass from Jameis Winston (Nick Folk kick), 0:15. Buccaneers 10–0 **Drive 1 play, 13 yards, 0:05.**

**Second quarter**

- TB – Jacquizz Rodgers 1-yard run (Nick Folk kick), 7:35. Buccaneers 17–0 **Drive 9 plays, 65 yards, 3:56.**
- TB – Robert McClain 47-yard interception return (kick failed, wide right), 4:21. Buccaneers 23-0
- TB – Nick Folk 50-yard field goal, ):04. Buccaneers 26-0 **Drive 8 plays, 48 yards, 1:04.**

**Third quarter**

**Fourth quarter**

- TB – Nick Folk 23-yard field goal, 12:29. Buccaneers 29-0 **Drive 16 plays, 87 yards, 8:36.**
- CHI – Deonte Thompson 14-yard pass from Mike Glennon (Connor Barth kick), 1:49. Buccaneers 29-7 **Drive 7 plays, 62 yards, 2:07.**

**Top passers**

- CHI – Mike Glennon – 31/45, 301 yards, 1 TD, 2 INT
- TB – Jameis Winston – 18/30, 204 yards, 1 TD

**Top rushers**

- CHI – Tarik Cohen – 7 rushes, 13 yards
- TB – Jacquizz Rodgers – 19 rushes, 67 yards, 1 TD

**Top receivers**

- CHI – Kendall Wright – 7 receptions, 69 yards
- TB – Mike Evans – 7 receptions, 93 yards, 1 TD

**Top tacklers**

- CHI – Eddie Jackson – 7 tackles, 1 assisted tackle
- TB – Lavonte David – 8 tackles, 1 assisted tackle

After a bye in Week 1 due to Hurricane Irma, Tampa Bay began their season in Week 2 against Chicago. Jameis Winston threw for 204 yards and 1 touchdown pass to Mike Evans, as the Buccaneers routed the Bears 29–7. Bears quarterback (and former Buccaneer) Mike Glennon lost a fumble, and threw two interceptions, one of which was returned for a touchdown.

==== Week 3: at Minnesota Vikings ====
Week Three: Tampa Bay Buccaneers at Minnesota Vikings – Game summary

Quarter	1	2	3	4	Total
Buccaneers	3	0	14	0	**17**
**Vikings**	7	14	10	3	**34**

at U.S. Bank Stadium, Minneapolis, Minnesota

- Date: September 24
- Game time: 1:00 pm. EDT/12:00 p.m. CDT
- Game weather: Played indoors (dome stadium)
- Game attendance: 66,390
- Referee: John Hussey
- TV announcers (Fox): Thom Brennaman, Chris Spielman and Peter Schrager
- Recap, Gamebook

Game information

First quarter

- MIN – Dalvin Cook 1-yard run (Kai Forbath kick), 10:58. Vikings 7–0. **Drive: 7 plays, 75 yards, 4:02.**
- TB – Nick Folk 40-yard field goal, 6:18. Vikings 7–3. **Drive: 8 plays, 53 yards, 4:40.**

Second quarter

- MIN – Jarius Wright 2-yard pass from Case Keenum (Kai Forbath kick), 10:25. Vikings 14–3. **Drive: 13 plays, 76 yards, 5:57.**
- MIN – Stefon Diggs 17-yard pass from Case Keenum (Kai Forbath kick), 0:47. Vikings 21–3. **Drive: 6 plays, 92 yards, 3:04.**

Third quarter

- MIN – Stefon Diggs 59-yard pass from Case Keenum (Kai Forbath kick), 12:25. Vikings 28–3. **Drive: 3 plays, 66 yards, 1:03.**
- TB – Cameron Brate 15-yard pass from Jameis Winston (Nick Folk kick), 8:47. Vikings 28–10. **Drive: 6 plays, 46 yards, 3:38.**
- MIN – Kai Forbath 20-yard field goal, 2:24. Vikings 31–10. **Drive: 13 plays, 73 yards, 6:23.**
- TB – DeSean Jackson 25-yard pass from Jameis Winston (Nick Folk kick), 0:00. Vikings 31–17. **Drive: 7 plays, 75 yards, 2:24.**

Fourth quarter

- MIN – Kai Forbath 37-yard field goal, 8:40. Vikings 34–17. **Drive: 6 plays, 16 yards, 3:45.**

Top passers

- TB – Jameis Winston – 28/40, 328 yards, 2 TD, 3 INT
- MIN – Case Keenum – 25/33, 369 yards, 3 TD

Top rushers

- TB – Jacquizz Rodgers – 5 rushes, 15 yards
- MIN – Dalvin Cook – 27 rushes, 97 yards, TD

Top receivers

- TB – DeSean Jackson – 4 receptions, 84 yards, TD
- MIN – Stefon Diggs – 8 receptions, 173 yards, 2 TD

Before the game, wide receivers Mike Evans and DeSean Jackson kneeled during the national anthem after comments made by president Donald Trump about national anthem protests two days prior. The Vikings jumped out to a 28–3 lead by the third quarter, while the Buccaneers defense could not contain Case Keenum, who threw for 369 yards and three touchdown passes. After quarterback Jameis Winston threw his second interception, a frustrated Evans was seen kicking over the ice tub on the sidelines. Minnesota held on to top Tampa Bay by the final score of 34–17.

==== Week 4: vs. New York Giants ====
Week Four: New York Giants at Tampa Bay Buccaneers – Game summary

Quarter	1	2	3	4	Total
Giants	0	10	7	6	**23**
**Buccaneers**	13	3	0	9	**25**

at Raymond James Stadium, Tampa, Florida

- Date: October 1
- Game time: 4:05 pm. EDT
- Game weather: 91 °F (33 °C), cloudy
- Game attendance: 63,916
- Referee: Craig Wrolstad
- TV announcers (Fox): Kenny Albert, Ronde Barber, Tiki Barber and Kristina Pink
- Recap, Gamebook

Game information

**First quarter**

- TB – Mike Evans 6-yard pass from Jameis Winston (Nick Folk kick), 7:47. Buccaneers 7–0. **Drive: 4 plays, 56 yards, 2:01.**
- TB – O. J. Howard 58-yard pass from Jameis Winston (kick failed), 3:00. Buccaneers 13–0. **Drive: 2 plays, 70 yards, 0:45.**

**Second quarter**

- NYG – Aldrick Rosas 30-yard field goal, 7:17. Buccaneers 13–3. **Drive: 11 plays, 52 yards, 4:36.**
- NYG – Eli Manning 14-yard run (Aldrick Rosas kick), 3:17. Buccaneers 13–10. **Drive: 7 plays, 62 yards, 3:12.**
- TB – Nick Folk 20-yard field goal, 0:32. Buccaneers 16–10. **Drive: 12 plays, 73 yards, 2:45.**

**Third quarter**

- NYG – Wayne Gallman 4-yard pass from Eli Manning (Aldrick Rosas kick), 4:19. Giants 17–16. **Drive: 11 plays, 61 yards, 5:51.**

**Fourth quarter**

- TB – Cameron Brate 14-yard pass from Jameis Winston (pass failed), 7:44. Buccaneers 22–17. **Drive: 4 plays, 57 yards, 1:41.**
- NYG – Rhett Ellison 2-yard pass from Eli Manning (pass failed), 3:16. Giants 23–22. **Drive: 10 plays, 75 yards, 4:28.**
- TB – Nick Folk 34-yard field goal, 0:00. Buccaneers 25–23. **Drive: 9 plays, 59 yards, 3:16.**

**Top passers**

- NYG – Eli Manning – 30/49, 288 yards, 2 TD
- TB – Jameis Winston – 22/38, 332 yards, 3 TD

**Top rushers**

- NYG – Wayne Gallman – 11 carries, 42 yards
- TB – Jacquizz Rodgers – 16 carries, 83 yards

**Top receivers**

- NYG – Odell Beckham Jr. – 7 receptions, 90 yards
- TB – Adam Humphries – 6 receptions, 70 yards

**Top tacklers**

- NYG –
- TB –

Jameis Winston threw for 332 yards and three touchdown passes, but Tampa Bay found themselves trailing by a point late in the fourth quarter to the New York Giants. Tampa Bay jumped out to a 13–0 lead in the first quarter, but Nick Folk missed an extra point and later missed two field goal attempts. The Giants took a 23–22 lead with 3:16 remaining in regulation after a 2-yard touchdown pass from Eli Manning to Rhett Ellison. In the final three minutes, Winston drove the Buccaneers to the Giants' 16-yard line. Folk kicked a 34-yard field goal just inside the left upright as time expired, and Tampa Bay won 25–23.

==== Week 5: vs. New England Patriots ====
Week Five: New England Patriots at Tampa Bay Buccaneers – Game summary

Quarter	1	2	3	4	Total
**Patriots**	3	10	3	3	**19**
Buccaneers	0	7	0	7	**14**

at Raymond James Stadium, Tampa, Florida

- Date: October 5
- Game time: 8:25 pm. EDT
- Game weather: 76 °F (24 °C), clear
- Game attendance: 64,476
- Referee: Carl Cheffers
- TV announcers (CBS/NFLN/Amazon Video): Jim Nantz, Tony Romo and Tracy Wolfson
- Recap, Gamebook

Game information

**First quarter**

- NE – Stephen Gostkowski 27-yard field goal, 1:21. Patriots 3–0. **Drive: 13 plays, 89 yards, 7:10.**

**Second quarter**

- TB – Doug Martin 1-yard run (Nick Folk kick), 8:26. Buccanneers 7–3. **Drive: 11 plays, 68 yards, 5:12.**
- NE – Chris Hogan 5-yard pass from Tom Brady (Stephen Gostkowski kick), 3:42. Patriots 10–7. **Drive: 9 plays, 75 yards, 4:44.**
- NE – Stephen Gostkowski 23-yard field goal, 9:55. Patriots 13–7. **Drive: 7 plasy, 22 yards, 1:33.**

**Third quarter**

- NE – Stephen Gostkowski 45-yard field goal, 9:55. Patriots 16–7. **Drive: 8 plays, 67 yards, 3:25.**

**Fourth quarter**

- TB – Cameron Brate 18-yard pass from Jameis Winston (Nick Folk kick), 2:09. Patriots 16–14. **Drive: 9 plays, 74 yards, 2:17.**
- NE – Stephen Gostkowski 48-yard field goal, 1:10. Patriots 19–14. **Drive: 4 plays, 7 yards, 0:59.**

**Top passers**

- NE – Tom Brady – 30/40, 303 yards, TD, INT
- TB – Jameis Winston – 26/46, 334 yards, TD

**Top rushers**

- NE – Dion Lewis – 7 rushes, 53 yards
- TB – Doug Martin – 13 rushes, 74 yards, TD

**Top receivers**

- NE – Brandin Cooks – 5 receptions, 85 yards
- TB – DeSean Jackson – 5 receptions, 106 yards

**Top tacklers**

- NE – Devin McCourty – 11 tackles
- TB – Kendell Beckwith – 12 tackles

The Tampa Bay defense played significantly better, picking off Patriots quarterback Tom Brady (his first interception of the season) and getting a sack fumble. Running back Doug Martin returned from his suspension, and had a productive showing, rushing for 74 yards on 14 carries and scoring a touchdown. However, the Tampa Bay offense mostly struggled through the first three quarters. Meanwhile, Buccaneers kicker Nick Folk struggled mightily, missing on all three of his field goal attempts. Late in the fourth quarter, Jameis Winston threw a touchdown pass to tight end Cameron Brate, making the score 16–14 with just over two minutes left in regulation. After a failed onside kicked, the Patriots scored a field goal putting themselves up by five. The Buccaneers got the ball back with 1:10 remaining, and zero timeouts left. Winston drove the Buccaneers to the New England 18-yard line with 3 seconds to go. Winston's pass to O. J. Howard in the endzone as time expired fell incomplete, ending the team's six-game home winning streak. After missing six kicks since the Giants game (five field goals and one extra point), kicker Nick Folk was placed on injured reserve.

==== Week 6: at Arizona Cardinals ====
Week Six: Tampa Bay Buccaneers vs Arizona Cardinals – Game summary

Quarter	1	2	3	4	Total
Buccaneers	0	0	6	27	**33**
**Cardinals**	14	10	7	7	**38**

at University of Phoenix Stadium, Glendale, Arizona

- Date: October 15
- Game time: 4:05 pm. EDT/1:05 p.m. MST
- Game weather: Played indoors (retractable roof closed)
- Game attendance: 63,999
- Referee: Gene Steratore
- TV announcers (Fox): Kenny Albert, Charles Davis and Pam Oliver
- Recap, Gamebook

Game information

**First quarter**

- ARI – Adrian Peterson 27-yard run (Phil Dawson kick), 11:52. Cardinals 7–0. **Drive: 6 plays, 75 yards, 3:08.**
- ARI – Troy Niklas 14-yard pass from Carson Palmer (Phil Dawson kick), 5:24. Cardinals 14–0. **Drive: 7 plays, 86 yards, 3:38.**

**Second quarter**

- ARI – Larry Fitzgerald 11-yard pass from Carson Palmer (Phil Dawson kick), 12:04. Cardinals 21–0. **Drive: 7 plays, 95 yards, 4:04.**
- ARI – Phil Dawson 28-yard field goal, 5:31. Cardinals 24–0. **Drive: 10 plays, 60 yards, 6:02.**

**Third quarter**

- ARI – John Brown 17-yard pass from Carson Palmer (Phil Dawson kick), 11:58. Cardinals 31–0. **Drive: 4 plays, 33 yards, 2:11.**
- TB – DeSean Jackson 4-yard pass from Ryan Fitzpatrick (run failed), 8:27. Cardinals 31–6. **Drive: 8 plays, 75 yards, 3:31.**

**Fourth quarter**

- TB – Cameron Brate 10-yard pass from Ryan Fitzpatrick (pass failed), 13:32. Cardinals 31–12. **Drive: 6 plays, 63 yards, 2:50.**
- TB – Lavonte David 21-yard fumble return (Doug Martin run), 12:56. Cardinals 31–19.
- ARI – Adrian Peterson 1-yard run (Phil Dawson kick), 7:17. Cardinals 38–19. **Drive: 1 plays, 1 yards, 0:05.**
- TB – Doug Martin 1-yard run (pass failed), 3:02. Cardinals 38–25. **Drive: 11 plays, 70 yards, 4:15.**
- TB – Mike Evans 37-yard pass from Ryan Fitzpatrick (Patrick Murray kick), 2:02. Cardinals 38–33. **Drive: 3 plays, 65 yards, 0:32.**

**Top passers**

- TB – Ryan Fitzpatrick – 22/32, 290 yards, 3 TD, 2 INT
- ARI – Carson Palmer – 18/22, 283 yards, 3 TD, INT

**Top rushers**

- TB – Doug Martin – 14 carries, 53 yards, TD
- ARI – Adrian Peterson – 26 carries, 134 yards, 2 TD

**Top receivers**

- TB – Cameron Brate – 6 receptions, 76 yards, TD
- ARI – Larry Fitzgerald – 10 receptions, 138 yards, TD

**Top tacklers**

- TB –
- ARI –

The Buccaneers started off horribly, both offensively and defensively as the Cardinals scored early. Five days earlier, veteran running back Adrian Peterson had been traded to Arizona from the Saints. Peterson started his first game for the Cardinals, scoring on the opening drive. Down 24–0 in the second quarter, Jameis Winston was sidelined with a shoulder injury and was replaced by backup quarterback Ryan Fitzpatrick. Winston would not return. After Fitzpatrick threw an interception early in the third quarter, the Cardinals scored again taking a 31–0 lead. The Buccaneers mounted a comeback, outscoring the Cardinals 33-7 for the remainder of the game, but came up short 38-33 after failing to recover an onside kick with just 2:02 remaining in regulation.

==== Week 7: at Buffalo Bills ====
Week Seven: Tampa Bay Buccaneers at Buffalo Bills – Game summary

Quarter	1	2	3	4	Total
Buccaneers	6	0	7	14	**27**
**Bills**	3	7	7	13	**30**

at New Era Field, Orchard Park, New York

- Date: October 22
- Game time: 1:00 pm. EDT
- Game weather: 74 °F (23 °C), sunny
- Game attendance: 68,561
- Referee: Clete Blakeman
- TV announcers (Fox): Chris Myers, Daryl Johnston and Laura Okmin
- Recap, Gamebook

Game information

**First quarter**

- TB – Patrick Murray 50-yard FG, 9:44. Buccaneers 3-0. **Drive: 11 plays, 43 yards, 5:16.**
- BUF – Stephen Hauschka 25-yard FG, 5:45. Tie 3-3. **Drive: 11 plays, 69 yards, 3:59.**
- TB – Murray 25-yard FG, 0:22. Buccaneers 6-3. **Drive: 11 plays, 68 yards, 5:23.**

**Second quarter**

- BUF – LeSean McCoy 1-yard run (Stephen Hauschka kick), 9:26. Bills 10-6. **Drive: 12 plays, 78 yards, 5:56.**

**Third quarter**

- BUF – Logan Thomas 22-yard pass from Tyrod Taylor (Hauschka kick), 11:36. Bills 17-6. **Drive: 8 plays, 75 yards, 3:24.**
- TB – O. J. Howard 7-yard pass from Jameis Winston (Murray kick), 7:11. Bills 17-13. **Drive: 7 plays, 75 yards, 4:25.**

**Fourth quarter**

- BUF – Hauschka 52-yard FG, 13:31. Bills 20-13. **Drive: 10 plays, 46 yards, 4:26.**
- TB – Howard 33-yard pass from Jameis Winston (Murray kick), 10:08. Tie 20-20. **Drive: 7 plays, 75 yards, 3:23.**
- TB – Mike Evans 12-yard pass from Winston (Murray kick), 3:14. Buccaneers 27-20. **Drive: 10 plays, 54 yards, 6:16.**
- BUF – McCoy 7-yard run (Hauschka kick), 2:28. Tie 27-27. **Drive: 3 plays, 75 yards, 0:46.**
- BUF – Hauschka 30-yard FG, 0:14. Bills 30-27. **Drive: 7 plays, 21 yards, 2:06.**

**Top passers**

- TB – Jameis Winston – 32/44, 384 yds, 3 TD, INT
- BUF – Tyrod Taylor – 20/33, 268 yds, TD

**Top rushers**

- TB – Doug Martin – 20 rush, 49 yds
- BUF – LeSean McCoy – 23 rush, 91 yds, 2 TD

**Top receivers**

- TB – Mike Evans – 7 rec, 88 yds, TD
- BUF – LeSean McCoy – 5 rec, 31 yds

**Top tacklers**

- TB – Lavonte David – 12 tkls, 2 asts, 1 ff
- BUF – Preston Brown – 5 tkls, 6 asts

The Buccaneers played a more consistent game, but still came up short in Buffalo. After scoring early in the third quarter, Buffalo took a 17–6 lead. After another Bills field goal, and two touchdown passes from Jameis Winston to rookie tight-end O. J. Howard, the game was tied, 20-20. With just over 3 minutes remaining in regulation, another touchdown pass by Winston, this time a diving catch just inbounds by Mike Evans gave the Buccaneers a 27–20 lead. On the next drive, the Bills drove down the field in three plays to tie the game, aided by an ill-timed 15-yard Unnecessary Roughness penalty by Robert McClain. With 2:20 left in the fourth, a pass from Winston to Adam Humphries was fumbled and recovered by the Bills at Tampa Bay 32-yard line. After running down the clock, the Bills kicked a field goal to win the game. With this loss, the Buccaneers now have lost three straight games, all by less than one score, and sit at 2–4 at the bottom of the NFC South.

==== Week 8: vs. Carolina Panthers ====
Week Eight: Carolina Panthers at Tampa Bay Buccaneers – Game summary

Quarter	1	2	3	4	Total
**Panthers**	7	3	0	7	**17**
Buccaneers	0	0	3	0	**3**

at Raymond James Stadium, Tampa, Florida

- Date: October 29
- Game time: 1:00 pm. EDT
- Game weather: 63 °F (17 °C), cloudy
- Game attendance: 58,545
- Referee: Walt Coleman
- TV announcers (Fox): Chris Myers, Daryl Johnston and Laura Okmin
- Recap, Gamebook

Game information

**First quarter**

- CAR – Jonathan Stewart 1-yard run (Graham Gano kick), 1:34. Panthers 7–0. **Drive: 17 plays, 82 yards, 8:38.**

**Second quarter**

- CAR – Graham Gano 28-yard field goal, 0:17. Panthers 10–0. **Drive: 9 plays, 41 yards, 2:11.**

**Third quarter**

- TB – Patrick Murray 41-yard field goal, 4:49. Panthers 10–3. **Drive: 8 plays, 31 yards, 3:27.**

**Fourth quarter**

- CAR – Kelvin Benjamin 25-yard pass from Cam Newton (Graham Gano kick), 8:48. Panthers 17–3. **Drive: 5 plays, 48 yards, 2:44.**

**Top passers**

- CAR – Cam Newton – 18/32, 154 yards, TD, INT
- TB – Jameis Winston – 21/38, 210 yards, 2 INT

**Top rushers**

- CAR – Cam Newton – 11 carries, 44 yards
- TB – Doug Martin – 18 carries, 71 yards

**Top receivers**

- CAR – Christian McCaffrey – 5 receptions, 49 yards
- TB – Mike Evans – 5 receptions, 60 yards

**Top tacklers**

- CAR –
- TB –

The Buccaneers drop their fourth straight game in a disappointing loss. The defense improved, while the offense only put up 3 points. With this loss, the Bucs move to 2-5 and are still at the bottom of the NFC South.

==== Week 9: at New Orleans Saints ====
Week Nine: Tampa Bay Buccaneers at New Orleans Saints – Game summary

Quarter	1	2	3	4	Total
Buccaneers	0	3	0	7	**10**
**Saints**	9	7	14	0	**30**

at Mercedes-Benz Superdome, New Orleans, Louisiana

- Date: November 5
- Game time: 1:00 pm. EST/12:00 pm. CST
- Game weather: Played indoors (dome stadium)
- Game attendance: 73,121
- Referee: Bill Vinovich
- TV announcers (Fox): Thom Brennaman, Chris Spielman and Peter Schrager
- Recap, Gamebook

Game information

**First quarter**

- NO – Wil Lutz 40-yard field goal, 8:49. Saints 3–0. **Drive: 12 plays, 58 yards, 6:11.**
- NO – Justin Hardee 7-yard return of block punt (kick blocked), 6:31. Saints 9–0.

**Second quarter**

- TB – Patrick Murray 50-yard field goal, 2:57. Saints 9–3. **Drive: 10 plays, 40 yards, 5:44.**
- NO – Alvin Kamara 33-yard pass from Drew Brees (Wil Lutz kick), 0:55. Saints 16–3. **Drive: 7 plays, 93 yards, 2:02.**

**Third quarter**

- NO – Alvin Kamara 6-yard run (Wil Lutz kick), 9:59. Saints 23–3. **Drive: 6 plays, 72 yards, 3:31.**
- NO – Ted Ginn Jr. 36-yard pass from Drew Brees (Wil Lutz kick), 9:39. Saints 30–3. **Drive: 1 plays, 36 yards, 0:07.**

**Fourth quarter**

- TB – Luke Stocker 8-yard pass from Ryan Fitzpatrick (Patrick Murray kick), 6:48. Saints 30–10. **Drive: 3 plays, 19 yards, 1:26.**

**Top passers**

- TB – Ryan Fitzpatrick – 8/15, 68 yards, TD
- NO – Drew Brees – 22/27, 263 yards, 2 TD

**Top rushers**

- TB – Peyton Barber – 11 carries, 34 yards
- NO – Mark Ingram II – 16 carries, 77 yards

**Top receivers**

- TB – DeSean Jackson – 2 receptions, 25 yards
- NO – Michael Thomas – 8 receptions, 65 yards

**Top tacklers**

- TB –
- NO –

The offense once again struggled as the Bucs lost their fifth straight game and their second straight against a division opponent. Jameis Winston sat out of the second half due to an injury and was replaced by Ryan Fitzpatrick. This game was also marred by a brawl on Tampa Bay's sideline in the 3rd quarter when Winston, who was already considered out with the aforementioned injury, went over and pushed Marshon Lattimore in his ear, and Mike Evans suddenly shoved Lattimore from behind to spark the fight; however, there were no ejections.

With this loss, the Bucs move to 2–6. This is the Bucs' longest losing streak since the 2014 season.

==== Week 10: vs. New York Jets ====
Week Ten: New York Jets at Tampa Bay Buccaneers – Game summary

Quarter	1	2	3	4	Total
Jets	0	3	0	7	**10**
**Buccaneers**	3	0	6	6	**15**

at Raymond James Stadium, Tampa, Florida

- Date: November 12
- Game time: 1:00 pm. EST
- Game weather: 79 °F (26 °C), cloudy
- Game attendance: 57,911
- Referee: Brad Allen
- TV announcers (CBS): Kevin Harlan and Rich Gannon
- Recap, Gamebook

Game information

**First quarter**

- TB – Patrick Murray 29-yard field goal, 0:54. Buccaneers 3–0. **Drive: 17 plays, 77 yards, 7:56.**

**Second quarter**

- NYJ – Chandler Catanzaro 47-yard field goal, 0:00. Tied 3–3. **Drive: 16 plays, 51 yards, 7:23.**

**Third quarter**

- TB – Patrick Murray 49-yard field goal, 10:42. Buccaneers 6–3. **Drive: 9 plays, 44 yards, 4:18.**
- TB – Patrick Murray 37-yard field goal, 0:29. Buccaneers 9–3. **Drive: 7 plays, 32 yards, 2:56.**

**Fourth quarter**

- TB – Charles Sims 6-yard pass from Ryan Fitzpatrick (run failed), 6:05. Buccaneers 15–3. **Drive: 15 plays, 81 yards, 7:25.**
- NYJ – Robby Anderson 38-yard pass from Josh McCown (Chandler Catanzaro kick), 0:28. Buccaneers 15–10. **Drive: 6 plays, 70 yards, 1:25.**

**Top passers**

- NYJ – Josh McCown – 23/39, 262 yards, TD, INT
- TB – Ryan Fitzpatrick – 17/34, 187 yards, TD, INT

**Top rushers**

- NYJ – Bilal Powell – 10 carries, 30 yards
- TB – Doug Martin – 20 carries, 51 yards

**Top receivers**

- NYJ – Austin Seferian-Jenkins – 6 receptions, 67 yards
- TB – DeSean Jackson – 6 receptions, 82 yards

**Top tacklers**

- NYJ –
- TB –

The Bucs end their five-game losing streak with a win at home against the Jets. With Jameis Winston out with an injury and Mike Evans out due to a one-game suspension earned in the previous game against the Saints, Ryan Fitzpatrick and rookie Chris Godwin got the starts for the Bucs. The only scores came from field goals until the fourth quarter where both teams scored late touchdowns. The Bucs scored first taking a 15–3 lead, then the Jets scored with 38 seconds left, cutting the lead to five points. A failed Jets onside kick sealed a Bucs win.

With the win, the Buccaneers snapped an eight-game losing streak to the Jets.

==== Week 11: at Miami Dolphins ====
Week Eleven: Tampa Bay Buccaneers at Miami Dolphins – Game summary

Quarter	1	2	3	4	Total
**Buccaneers**	3	17	0	10	**30**
Dolphins	7	0	6	7	**20**

at Hard Rock Stadium, Miami Gardens, Florida

- Date: November 19
- Game time: 1:00 pm. EST
- Game weather: 81 °F (27 °C), sunny
- Game attendance: 65,089
- Referee: Tony Corrente
- TV announcers (Fox): Dick Stockton, Mark Schlereth and Shannon Spake
- Recap, Gamebook

Game information

**First quarter**

- TB – Patrick Murray 30-yard field goal, 7:13. Buccaneers 3–0. **Drive: 7 plays, 63 yards, 3:28.**
- MIA – Jarvis Landry 2-yard pass from Jay Cutler (Cody Parkey kick), 4:23. Dolphins 7–3. **Drive: 7 plays, 90 yards, 2:50.**

**Second quarter**

- TB – Patrick Murray 30-yard field goal, 14:10. Dolphins 7–6. **Drive: 11 plays, 59 yards, 5:13.**
- TB – O. J. Howard 6-yard pass from Ryan Fitzpatrick (Patrick Murray kick), 12:14. Buccaneers 13–7. **Drive: 3 plays, 5 yards, 0:41.**
- TB – DeSean Jackson 4-yard pass from Ryan Fitzpatrick (Patrick Murray kick), 0:45. Buccaneers 20–7. **Drive: 4 plays, 37 yards, 1:05.**

**Third quarter**

- MIA – Cody Parkey 26-yard field goal, 10:57. Buccaneers 20–10. **Drive: 9 plays, 70 yards, 4:03.**
- MIA – Cody Parkey 31-yard field goal, 4:19. Buccaneers 20–13. **Drive: 11 plays, 66 yards, 4:52.**

**Fourth quarter**

- MIA – Kenny Stills 61-yard pass from Matt Moore (Cody Parkey kick), 3:00. Tied 20–20. **Drive: 5 plays, 74 yards, 1:37.**
- TB – Patrick Murray 35-yard field goal, 0:04. Buccaneers 23–20. **Drive: 9 plays, 58 yards, 2:56.**
- TB – Adarius Glanton fumble recovery in end zone (Patrick Murray kick), 0:00. Buccaneers 30–20.

**Top passers**

- TB – Ryan Fitzpatrick – 22/37, 275 yards, 2 TD
- MIA – Matt Moore – 17/28, 282 yards, TD

**Top rushers**

- TB – Doug Martin – 19 carries, 38 yards
- MIA – Damien Williams – 10 carries, 78 yards

**Top receivers**

- TB – Mike Evans – 5 receptions, 92 yards
- MIA – Kenny Stills – 7 receptions, 180 yards, TD

**Top tacklers**

- TB –
- MIA –

After originally being slated to play in Week 1, the Bucs and the Dolphins finally met on what should have been each other's bye week. The Bucs win consecutive games for the first time this year with a 30–20 win. The defense created 4 turnovers in the first half, 3 interceptions and one fumble. Ryan Fitzpatrick started once again, finishing with over 270 passing yards and 2 touchdowns. With this win, the Bucs move to 4–6.

==== Week 12: at Atlanta Falcons ====
Week Twelve: Tampa Bay Buccaneers at Atlanta Falcons – Game summary

Quarter	1	2	3	4	Total
Buccaneers	3	3	7	7	**20**
**Falcons**	3	17	7	7	**34**

at Mercedes-Benz Stadium, Atlanta, Georgia

- Date: November 26
- Game time: 1:00 pm. EST
- Game weather: Played indoors (retractable roof closed)
- Game attendance: 71,036
- Referee: Jeff Triplette
- TV announcers (Fox): Dick Stockton, Mark Schlereth and Shannon Spake
- Recap, Gamebook

Game information

**First quarter**

- TB – Patrick Murray 36-yard field goal, 9:45. Buccaneers 3–0. **Drive: 10 plays, 57 yards, 5:15.**
- ATL – Matt Bryant 49-yard field goal, 3:50. Tied 3–3. **Drive: 13 plays, 43 yards, 5:55.**

**Second quarter**

- ATL – Julio Jones 51-yard pass from Mohamed Sanu (Matt Bryant kick), 12:36. Falcons 10–3. **Drive: 3 plays, 60 yards, 1:23.**
- ATL – Julio Jones 25-yard pass from Matt Ryan (Matt Bryant kick), 7:26. Falcons 17–3. **Drive: 6 plays, 72 yards, 3:12.**
- TB – Patrick Murray 27-yard field goal, 1:36. Falcons 17–6. **Drive: 14 plays, 74 yards, 5:50.**
- ATL – Matt Bryant 36-yard field goal, 0:00. Falcons 20–6. **Drive: 8 plays, 59 yards, 1:36.**

**Third quarter**

- ATL – Tevin Coleman 3-yard run (Matt Bryant kick), 10:04. Falcons 27–6. **Drive: 9 plays, 78 yards, 4:56.**
- TB – Peyton Barber 2-yard run (Patrick Murray kick), 6:07. Falcons 27–13. **Drive: 10 plays, 75 yards, 3:57.**

**Fourth quarter**

- TB – Peyton Barber 1-yard run (Patrick Murray kick), 13:47. Falcons 27–20. **Drive: 9 plays, 80 yards, 3:39.**
- ATL – Tevin Coleman 14-yard run (Matt Bryant kick), 1:53. Falcons 34–20. **Drive: 11 plays, 82 yards, 5:12.**

**Top passers**

- TB – Ryan Fitzpatrick – 27/44, 283 yards
- ATL – Matt Ryan – 26/25, 317 yards, TD

**Top rushers**

- TB – Doug Martin – 7 carries, 33 yards
- ATL – Tevin Coleman – 19 carries, 97 yards, 2 TD

**Top receivers**

- TB – DeSean Jackson – 8 receptions, 60 yards
- ATL – Julio Jones – 12 receptions, 253 yards, 2 TD

**Top tacklers**

- TB –
- ATL –

The Bucs go 0–3 in the division with a loss at the Falcons. After going down 27–6 in the third quarter, the Bucs fought back to cut the lead to 27–20. After a turn over on downs, the Falcons scored again to end the game. With this loss, the Bucs fall to 4–7, equaling their loss total from last season.

==== Week 13: at Green Bay Packers ====
Week Thirteen: Tampa Bay Buccaneers at Green Bay Packers – Game summary

Quarter	1	2	3	4	OT	Total
Buccaneers	7	3	0	10	0	**20**
**Packers**	3	14	0	3	6	**26**

at Lambeau Field, Green Bay, Wisconsin

- Date: December 3
- Game time: 1:00 pm. EST/12:00 pm. CST
- Game weather: 42 °F (6 °C), cloudy
- Game attendance: 77,684
- Referee: Terry McAulay
- TV announcers (Fox): Tim Brando, Greg Jennings and Jennifer Hale
- Recap, Gamebook

Game information

First quarter

- TB – Cameron Brate 28-yard pass from Jameis Winston (Patrick Murray kick), 9:58. Buccaneers 7–0. **Drive: 10 plays, 75 yards, 5:08.**
- GB – Mason Crosby 37-yard field goal, 2:34. Buccaneers 7–3. **Drive: 14 plays, 61 yards, 7:22.**

Second quarter

- GB – Jamaal Williams 1-yard run (Mason Crosby kick), 7:17. Packers 10–7. **Drive: 5 plays, 45 yards, 2:32.**
- GB – Dean Lowry 61-yard fumble return (Mason Crosby kick), 4:31. Packers 17–7.
- TB – Patrick Murray 36-yard field goal, 0:17. Packers 17–10. **Drive: 12 plays, 57 yards, 4:04.**

Third quarter

- No scoring plays

Fourth quarter

- TB – Patrick Murray 30-yard field goal, 14:33. Packers 17–13. **Drive: 13 plays, 59 yards, 5:50.**
- TB – Cameron Brate 11-yard pass from Jameis Winston (Patrick Murray kick), 6:06. Buccaneers 20–17. **Drive: 12 plays, 78 yards, 7:02.**
- GB – Mason Crosby 22-yard field goal, 2:03. Tied 20–20. **Drive: 10 plays, 70 yards, 4:01.**

Overtime

- GB – Aaron Jones 20-yard run, 6:08. Packers 26–20. **Drive: 8 plays, 72 yards, 4:01.**

Top passers

- TB – Jameis Winston – 21/32, 270 yards, 2 TD
- GB – Brett Hundley – 13/22, 84 yards, INT

Top rushers

- TB – Peyton Barber – 23 rushes, 102 yards
- GB – Jamaal Williams – 21 rushes, 113 yards, TD

Top receivers

- TB – Peyton Barber – 4 receptions, 41 yards
- GB – Davante Adams – 4 receptions, 42 yards

With the loss, the Bucs exceeded their loss total from the previous season.

==== Week 14: vs. Detroit Lions ====
Week Fourteen: Detroit Lions at Tampa Bay Buccaneers – Game summary

Quarter	1	2	3	4	Total
**Lions**	7	7	7	3	**24**
Buccaneers	7	0	0	14	**21**

at Raymond James Stadium, Tampa, Florida

- Date: December 10
- Game time: 1:00 pm. EST
- Game weather: 55 °F (13 °C), clear
- Game attendance: 60,372
- Referee: Ed Hochuli
- TV announcers (Fox): Kenny Albert, Ronde Barber and Kristina Pink
- Recap, Gamebook

Game information

**First quarter**

- DET – Theo Riddick 2-yard run. (Matt Prater kick). Lions 7–0. **Drive: 7 plays, 74 yards, 3:04.**
- TB – Doug Martin 1-yard run. (Patrick Murray kick). Tied 7–7. **Drive: 11 plays, 75 yards, 5:14.**

**Second quarter**

- DET – Golden Tate 5-yard pass from Matthew Stafford. (Matt Prater kick). Lions 14–7. **Drive: 6 plays, 46 yards, 3:21.**

**Third quarter**

- DET - Theo Riddick 18-yard run. (Matt Prater kick). Lions 21–7. **Drive: 6 plays, 51 yards, 2:59.**

**Fourth quarter**

- TB – O. J. Howard 2-yard pass from Jameis Winston (Patrick Murray kick). Lions 21–14. **Drive: 10 plays, 75 yards, 4:30.**
- TB – Leonard Wester 2-yard pass from Jameis Winston (Patrick Murray kick). Tied 21–21. **Drive: 6 plays, 72 yards, 2:06.**
- DET – Matt Prater 46-yard field goal. Lions 24–21. **Drive: 9 plays, 49 yards, 2:34.**

**Top passers**

- DET – Matthew Stafford – 36/44, 381 yards, TD, 2 INT
- TB – Jameis Winston – 26/38, 285 yards, 2 TD, 2 INT

**Top rushers**

- DET – Theo Riddick – 10 carries, 29 yards, 2 TD
- TB – Peyton Barber – 12 carries, 58 yards

**Top receivers**

- DET – Eric Ebron – 10 receptions, 94 yards
- TB – Chris Godwin – 5 receptions, 68 yards

**Top tacklers**

- DET – Glover Quin – 8 tackles, 1 assist
- TB – Lavonte David – 13 tackles, 1 assist

After going down 21–7 in the third, the Bucs fought back to tie the game 21-21. With 20 seconds left, the Lions scored a field goal to secure the win. With this loss, the Bucs were officially mathematically out of the playoffs. This marked the 10th straight season without a playoff appearance.

==== Week 15: vs. Atlanta Falcons ====
Week Fifteen: Atlanta Falcons at Tampa Bay Buccaneers – Game summary

Quarter	1	2	3	4	Total
**Falcons**	7	10	0	7	**24**
Buccaneers	7	0	7	7	**21**

at Raymond James Stadium, Tampa, Florida

- Date: December 18
- Game time: 8:30 pm. EST
- Game weather: 71 °F (22 °C), clear
- Game attendance: 62,382
- Referee: John Hussey
- TV announcers (ESPN): Sean McDonough, Jon Gruden and Lisa Salters
- Recap, Gamebook

Game information

**First quarter**

- ATL – Justin Hardy 6-yard pass from Matt Ryan (Matt Bryant kick), 6:54. Falcons 7–0. **Drive: 9 plays, 62 yards, 4:59.**
- TB – O. J. Howard 30-yard pass from Jameis Winston (Patrick Murray kick), 1:52. Tied 7–7. **Drive: 8 plays, 75 yards, 5:02.**

**Second quarter**

- ATL – Levine Toilolo 0-yard fumble recovery (Matt Bryant kick), 12:56. Falcons 14–7. **Drive: 9 plays, 77 yards, 3:56.**
- ATL – Matt Bryant 57-yard field goal, 3:12. Falcons 17–7. **Drive: 6 plays, 56 yards, 3:18.**

**Third quarter**

- TB – Mike Evans 42-yard pass from Jameis Winston (Patrick Murray kick), 8:31. Falcons 17–14. **Drive: 3 plays, 53 yards, 1:28.**

**Fourth quarter**

- ATL – Devonta Freeman 32-yard run (Matt Bryant kick), 7:58. Falcons 24–14. **Drive: 10 plays, 87 yards, 5:23.**
- TB – Adam Humphries 16-yard pass from Jameis Winston (Patrick Murray kick), 4:07. Falcons 24–21. **Drive: 10 plays, 75 yards, 3:51.**

**Top passers**

- ATL – Matt Ryan – 17/31, 212 yards, TD
- TB – Jameis Winston – 27/35, 299 yards, 3 TD

**Top rushers**

- ATL – Devonta Freeman – 22 carries, 126 yards, TD
- TB – Peyton Barber – 13 carries, 53 yards

**Top receivers**

- ATL – Devonta Freeman – 5 receptions, 68 yards
- TB – Mike Evans – 5 receptions, 79 yards, 1 TD

**Top tacklers**

- ATL –
- TB –

The Bucs lost their fourth straight game. This marked the first time since 2014 where the Bucs didn't win at least one of the two games against the Falcons. Jameis Winston played, arguably, his best game of the season finishing 27/35 on passes, throwing three touchdowns with no interceptions. A late fourth quarter pass to Adam Humphries brought the Bucs within three points, but kicker Pat Murray missed a 54-yard field goal with 0 seconds remaining to seal the loss. The Bucs move to 4–10 on the season, with the last two games being against division rivals New Orleans and Carolina.

During halftime, former Bucs coach Jon Gruden was inducted into the Buccaneers Ring of Honor. He is best known for leading the Bucs to their first Super Bowl win.

==== Week 16: at Carolina Panthers ====
Week Sixteen: Tampa Bay Buccaneers at Carolina Panthers – Game summary

Quarter	1	2	3	4	Total
Buccaneers	3	6	7	3	**19**
**Panthers**	3	9	3	7	**22**

at Bank of America Stadium, Charlotte, North Carolina

- Date: December 24
- Game time: 1:00 pm. EST
- Game weather: 55 °F (13 °C), cloudy
- Game attendance: 71,463
- Referee: Jerome Boger
- TV announcers (Fox): Kenny Albert, Ronde Barber and Kristina Pink
- Recap, Gamebook

Game information

**First quarter**

- CAR – Graham Gano 25-yard field goal, 8:13. Panthers 3–0. **Drive: 7 plays, 26 yards, 3:55.**
- TB – Patrick Murray 31-yard field goal, 2:24. Tied 3–3. **Drive: 11 plays, 63 yards, 5:49.**

**Second quarter**

- CAR – Graham Gano 28-yard field goal, 8:38. Panthers 6–3. **Drive: 10 plays, 71 yards, 4:58.**
- TB – Patrick Murray 41-yard field goal, 2:58. Tied 6–6. **Drive: 6 plays, 61 yards, 2:18.**
- CAR – Damiere Byrd 103-yard kickoff return (kick failed), 2:43. Panthers 12–6.
- TB – Patrick Murray 21-yard field goal, 0:02. Panthers 12–9. **Drive: 9 plays, 72 yards, 2:41.**

**Third quarter**

- TB – Bobo Wilsonn 18-yard pass from Jameis Winston (Patrick Murray kick), 10:27. Buccaneers 16–12. **Drive: 3 plays, 49 yards, 1:01.**
- CAR – Graham Gano 30-yard field goal, 4:49. Buccaneers 16–15. **Drive: 12 plays, 68 yards, 5:38.**

**Fourth quarter**

- TB – Patrick Murray 26-yard field goal, 14:57. Buccaneers 19–15. **Drive: 10 plays, 67 yards, 4:52.**
- CAR – Cam Newton 2-yard run (Graham Gano kick), 0:35. Panthers 22–19. **Drive: 10 plays, 59 yards, 2:25.**

**Top passers**

- TB – Jameis Winston – 21/27, 367 yards, TD
- CAR – Cam Newton – 16/25, 160 yards, INT

**Top rushers**

- TB – Peyton Barber – 13 carries, 51 yards
- CAR – Cam Newton – 14 carries, 52 yards, TD

**Top receivers**

- TB – Mike Evans – 6 receptions, 107 yards
- CAR – Brenton Bersin – 3 receptions, 45 yards

**Top tacklers**

- TB –
- CAR –

The Bucs drop their fifth straight for the second time this season. With this loss, the Bucs have had 7 of their 11 losses come by 7 points or less.

==== Week 17: vs. New Orleans Saints ====
Week Seventeen: New Orleans Saints at Tampa Bay Buccaneers – Game summary

Quarter	1	2	3	4	Total
Saints	14	0	3	7	**24**
**Buccaneers**	7	6	0	18	**31**

at Raymond James Stadium, Tampa, Florida

- Date: December 31
- Game time: 4:25 pm. EST
- Game weather: 71 °F (22 °C), clear
- Game attendance: 55,376
- Referee: Walt Anderson
- TV announcers (Fox): Thom Brennaman, Chris Spielman and Peter Schrager
- Recap, Gamebook

Game information

**First quarter**

- TB – Peyton Barber 1-yard run (Patrick Murray kick), 9:42. Buccaneers 7–0. **Drive: 14 plays, 75 yards, 5:18.**
- NO – Alvin Kamara 106-yard kickoff return (Wil Lutz kick), 9:29. Tied 7–7.
- NO – Alvin Kamara 7-yard run (Wil Lutz kick), 2:36. Saints 14–7. **Drive: 6 plays, 65 yards, 3:24.**

**Second quarter**

- TB – Jameis Winston 1-yard run (kick failed), 5:50. Saints 14–13. **Drive: 12 plays, 75 yards, 6:15.**

**Third quarter**

- NO – Wil Lutz 48-yard field goal, 2:44. Saints 17–13. **Drive: 9 plays, 50 yards, 5:18.**

**Fourth quarter**

- TB – Isaiah Johnson 7-yard fumble return (Patrick Murray kick), 14:04. Buccaneers 20–17.
- NO – Zach Line 3-yard pass from Drew Brees (Wil Lutz kick), 7:07. Saints 24–20. **Drive: 13 plays, 92 yards, 6:57.**
- TB – Patrick Murray 42-yard field goal, 4:31. Saints 24–23. **Drive: 10 plays, 51 yards, 2:36.**
- TB – Chris Godwin 39-yard pass from Jameis Winston (Jameis Winston-Mike Evans pass), 0:09. Buccaneers 31–24. **Drive: 11 plays, 95 yards, 1:49.**

**Top passers**

- NO – Drew Brees – 22/30, 245 yards, TD
- TB – Jameis Winston – 28/51, 363 yards, TD, 3 INT

**Top rushers**

- NO – Alvin Kamara – 9 carries, 44 yards, TD
- TB – Peyton Barber – 17 carries, 71 yards, TD

**Top receivers**

- NO – Michael Thomas – 6 receptions, 94 yards
- TB – Chris Godwin – 7 receptions, 111 yards, TD

**Top tacklers**

- NO –
- TB –

=== Standings ===
==== Division ====
NFC South
	W	L	T	PCT	DIV	CONF	PF	PA	STK
^{(4)} New Orleans Saints	11	5	0	.688	4–2	8–4	448	326	L1
^{(5)} Carolina Panthers	11	5	0	.688	3–3	7–5	363	327	L1
^{(6)} Atlanta Falcons	10	6	0	.625	4–2	9–3	353	315	W1
Tampa Bay Buccaneers	5	11	0	.313	1–5	3–9	335	382	W1

==== Conference ====
NFC
#	Team	Division	W	L	T	PCT	DIV	CONF	SOS	SOV	STK
**Division leaders**
1 (Note: Philadelphia claimed the No. 1 seed over Minnesota based on winning percentage vs. common opponents. Philadelphia's cumulative record against Carolina, Chicago, the Los Angeles Rams and Washington was 5–0, compared to Minnesota's 4–1 cumulative record against the same four teams.)	Philadelphia Eagles	East	13	3	0	.813	5–1	10–2	.461	.433	L1
2	Minnesota Vikings	North	13	3	0	.813	5–1	10–2	.492	.447	W3
3 (Note: LA Rams claimed the No. 3 seed over New Orleans based on head-to-head victory.)	Los Angeles Rams	West	11	5	0	.688	4–2	7–5	.504	.460	L1
4 (Note: New Orleans clinched the NFC South division over Carolina based on head-to-head sweep.)	New Orleans Saints	South	11	5	0	.688	4–2	8–4	.535	.483	L1
**Wild Cards**
5	Carolina Panthers	South	11	5	0	.688	3–3	7–5	.539	.500	L1
6	Atlanta Falcons	South	10	6	0	.625	4–2	9–3	.543	.475	W1
**Did not qualify for the postseason**
7 (Note: Detroit finished ahead of Dallas and Seattle based on conference record, while Seattle finished ahead of Dallas based on head-to-head victory.)	Detroit Lions	North	9	7	0	.563	5–1	8–4	.496	.368	W1
8	Seattle Seahawks	West	9	7	0	.563	4–2	7–5	.492	.444	L1
9	Dallas Cowboys	East	9	7	0	.563	5–1	7–5	.496	.438	W1
10	Arizona Cardinals	West	8	8	0	.500	3–3	5–7	.488	.406	W2
11 (Note: Green Bay finished ahead of Washington based on record vs. common opponents. Green Bay's cumulative record against Dallas, Minnesota, New Orleans and Seattle was 2–3, compared to Washington's 1–4 cumulative record against the same four teams.)	Green Bay Packers	North	7	9	0	.438	2–4	5–7	.539	.357	L3
12	Washington Redskins	East	7	9	0	.438	1–5	5–7	.539	.429	L1
13	San Francisco 49ers	West	6	10	0	.375	1–5	3–9	.512	.438	W5
14 (Note: Tampa Bay finished ahead of Chicago based on head-to-head victory.)	Tampa Bay Buccaneers	South	5	11	0	.313	1–5	3–9	.555	.375	W1
15	Chicago Bears	North	5	11	0	.313	0–6	1–11	.559	.500	L1
16	New York Giants	East	3	13	0	.188	1–5	1–11	.531	.458	W1
**Tiebreakers** (Note: When breaking ties for three or more teams under the NFL's rules, they are first broken within divisions, then comparing only the highest-ranked remaining team from each division.)
