= Josh Robinson (cornerback) =

American football player (born 1991)

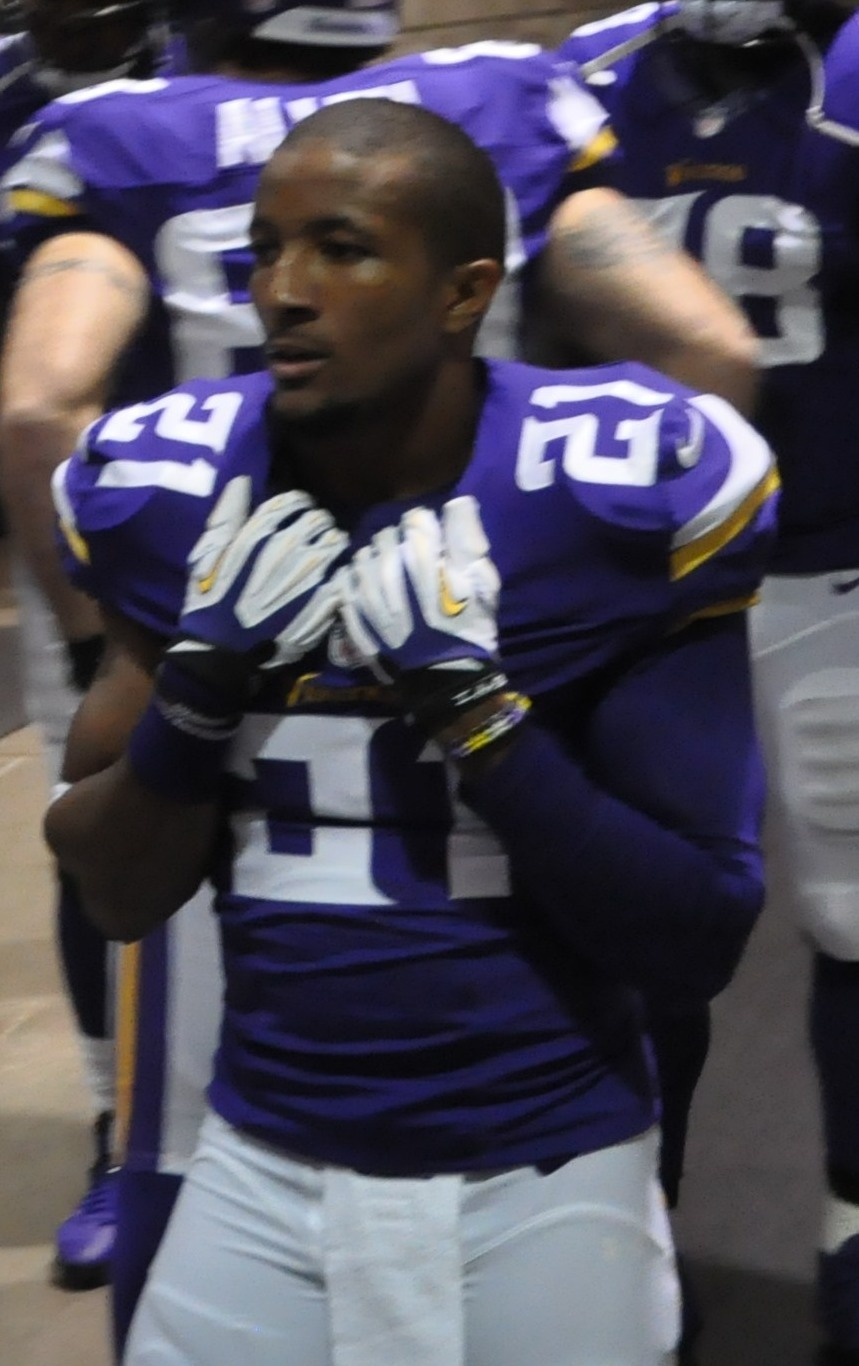
- Robinson with the Minnesota Vikings in 2013

No. 21, 26, 32, 29
- Position: Cornerback

Personal information
- Born: January 8, 1991 (age 35); Fort Lauderdale, Florida, U.S.
- Listed height: 5 ft 10 in (1.78 m)
- Listed weight: 200 lb (91 kg)

Career information
- High school: Plantation (Plantation, Florida)
- College: UCF (2009–2011)
- NFL draft: 2012: 3rd round, 66th overall pick

Career history
- Minnesota Vikings (2012–2015); Tampa Bay Buccaneers (2016–2017); New Orleans Saints (2018); Jacksonville Jaguars (2019)

Awards and highlights
- 2× First-team All-C-USA (2010, 2011); Second-team All-C-USA (2009); Unanimous Freshman All-American (2009)

Career NFL statistics
- Total tackles: 182
- Forced fumbles: 2
- Pass deflections: 15
- Interceptions: 5
- Stats at Pro Football Reference

Joshua Robinson (born January 8, 1991) is an American former professional football player who was a cornerback in the National Football League (NFL). He played college football for the UCF Knights and earned numerous Freshman All-American honors in 2009. He was selected by the Minnesota Vikings in the third round of the 2012 NFL draft. He was also a member of the Tampa Bay Buccaneers, New Orleans Saints, and Jacksonville Jaguars.

== Early life ==
Robinson attended Plantation High School in Plantation, Florida. He played wide receiver, running back and cornerback for the Colonels. He was coached by Steve Davis. As a junior, he posted 15 catches for 286 yards and two touchdowns, while also rushing for 136 yards and amassing three touchdowns on kick returns. He recorded 18 receptions for 364 yards during an injury-filled senior year. He was selected for the Dade-Broward All-Star Game

Robinson was also a standout athlete for the school's track team. At the 2008 BCAA North Central Prelims, he placed 4th in the 100 meters, with a career-best time of 10.77 seconds, in addition to a 2nd place in the 200 meters, with another career-best time of 21.61 seconds. He also competed in long jump.

== College career ==
Robinson attended the University of Central Florida, and he played for the UCF Knights football team. He started 35 of his 38 career games played. He earned 1st-Team All-Conference USA as a sophomore and junior while garnering 2nd-Team honors as a true freshman. He set the UCF freshman record with 6 interceptions as a true freshman in 2009 and his 6 picks tied for 2nd in the Knights’ single-season records. He notched 10 career interceptions, good for 5th in UCF history and his 147 career interception return yards ranks 8th in school history. He notched 15 passes defensed as a junior, which tied for 2nd in UCF history in a season. He also scored 3 career touchdowns.

== Professional career ==
=== Pre-draft ===
Robinson attended the NFL Scouting Combine in Indianapolis, Indiana and completed all of the combine drills. He increased his draft value by running the 40-yard dash in 4.32-4.33 seconds, placing first among all prospects who participated. He also impressed scouts with a 38.5 inch vertical jump. On March 28, 2012, he attended Central Florida's pro day, but opted to stand on his combine numbers and only performed positional drills. During the pre-draft process, he attended private workouts and visits with the Baltimore Ravens and Buffalo Bills. At the conclusion of the pre-draft process, Robinson was projected to be a second round pick by NFL draft experts and scouts. He was ranked the fourth best cornerback prospect in the draft by NFL analyst Mike Mayock, was ranked the fifth best cornerback by DraftScout.com, and was ranked the seventh best cornerback by the Bleacher Report.

External videos
- Robinson's NFL Combine Workout

Pre-draft measurables
| Height | Weight | Arm length | Hand span | Wingspan | 40-yard dash | 10-yard split | 20-yard split | 20-yard shuttle | Three-cone drill | Vertical jump | Broad jump | Bench press |
|---|---|---|---|---|---|---|---|---|---|---|---|---|
| 5 ft 10 1/8 in (1.78 m) | 199 lb (90 kg) | 31 1/4 in (0.79 m) | 9 1/4 in (0.23 m) | 6 ft 2 in (1.88 m) | 4.33 s | 1.51 s | 2.55 s | 3.97 s | 6.55 s | 38.5 in (0.98 m) | 11 ft 1 in (3.38 m) | 17 reps |
All values from NFL Combine

=== Minnesota Vikings ===
==== 2012 ====
The Minnesota Vikings selected Robinson in the third round (66th overall) of the 2012 NFL draft. He was the seventh cornerback drafted in 2012.

External videos
- Vikings select Robinson 66th overall

On July 25, 2012, the Minnesota Vikings signed Robinson to a four-year, $3.02 million contract that includes a signing bonus of $697,000.

He started training camp competing for a job as a starting cornerback against Antoine Winfield, Chris Cook, Asher Allen, Chris Carr, Zack Bowman, and Brandon Burton. He missed part of training camp after suffering a hamstring injury, but returned to compete for the job as the third cornerback against Brandon Burton. On August 28, 2012, Robinson recorded two solo tackles before exiting a 12–10 loss to the San Diego Chargers due to a concussion. Head coach Leslie Frazier named Robinson the third cornerback on the depth chart to begin the regular season, behind Antoine Winfield and Chris Cook.

He made his professional regular season debut in the Minnesota Vikings' season-opener against the Jacksonville Jaguars and recorded four solo tackles in their 26–23 victory. Robinson made his first career tackle on wide receiver Justin Blackmon after a 13-yard reception by Blackmon on the Jaguars' first drive. On September 23, 2012, Robinson recorded four combined tackles, deflected a pass, and made his first career interception during a 24–13 victory against the San Francisco 49ers in Week 3. His interception occurred in the fourth quarter off a pass by quarterback Alex Smith that was originally intended for Michael Crabtree. In Week 4, he earned his first career start and collected a season-high seven solo tackles and broke up a pass in the Vikings' 20–13 victory at the Detroit Lions. On December 9, 2012, Robinson made his fifth start of the season after Chris Cook broke his wrist in Week 8. Robinson made five solo tackles, a pass deflection, and returned an interception by Jay Cutler for a 44-yard gain during a 21–14 win over the Chicago Bears. He finished his rookie season in 2012 with 56 combined tackles (52 solo), three pass deflections, and two interceptions in 16 games and six starts.

==== 2013 ====
Throughout training camp, Robinson competed for a job as a starting cornerback against Chris Cook, A. J. Jefferson, and rookie first round pick Xavier Rhodes. He also competed to be the Vikings' top option at nickelback against Marcus Sherels, A. J. Jefferson, and Jacob Lacey. Defensive coordinator Alan Williams named Robinson a starting cornerback to begin the regular season, along with Chris Cook. He was also named their first-team nickelback.

On September 29, 2013, Robinson recorded a season-high 12 solo tackles in the Vikings' 34–27 win against the Pittsburgh Steelers in Week 4. In Week 7, he had a season-high two pass deflections and six combined tackles during a 23–7 loss at the New York Giants. On November 17, 2013, Robinson made a tackle and a pass deflection before exiting the Vikings' 41–20 loss at the Seattle Seahawks with a fractured sternum and was expected to be sidelined for at least a month. On December 14, 2013, the Minnesota Vikings placed Robinson on injured reserve for the remainder of the season. Robinson finished his first season as a starter with a career-high 58 combined tackles (48 solo) and four pass deflections in ten games and ten starts. He spent the season playing primarily at nickelback under defensive coordinator Alan Williams. On December 30, 2013, it was announced that the Minnesota Vikings fired head coach Leslie Frazier after finishing last in the NFC North with a 5–10–1 record.

==== 2014 ====
During organized team activities, new head coach Mike Zimmer stated Robinson would be moved back to outside cornerback after the Vikings acquired free agent Captain Munnerlyn to play nickelback. Throughout training camp, he competed for the job as the starting cornerback against Xavier Rhodes, Derek Cox, Shaun Prater, Marcus Sherels, Kendall James, and Jabari Price. Defensive coordinator George Edwards named Robinson the third cornerback on the depth chart to start the regular season, behind Xavier Rhodes and Captain Munnerlyn.

He appeared in the Minnesota Vikings' season-opener at the St. Louis Rams and recorded a season-high two pass deflections, two solo tackles, and intercepted a pass by quarterback Shaun Hill in their 34–6 victory. In Week 11, Robinson collected a season-high eight solo tackles and deflected a pass during a 21–13 loss at the Chicago Bears. On November 30, 2014, Robinson made a solo tackle, broke up a pass, and intercepted a pass attempt by Cam Newton in the Vikings' 31–13 win against the Carolina Panthers. He finished the 2014 season with 41 combined tackles (39 solo), a career-high eight pass deflections, and a career-high three interceptions in 16 games and five starts.

==== 2015 ====
During organized team activities, Robinson tore his pectoral muscle and was expected to miss the beginning of the regular season. He returned in November, but was sixth on the Vikings' depth chart, behind Terence Newman, Xavier Rhodes, Trae Waynes, Marcus Sherels, and Captain Munnerlyn. On November 29, 2015, Robinson made his season debut and recorded one tackle during a 20–10 victory at the Atlanta Falcons. He only appeared in five games during the season and had two solo tackles.

The Minnesota Vikings finished first in the NFC North with an 11–5 record. On January 10, 2016, Robinson appeared in his first career playoff game and recorded three solo tackles in the Vikings' 10–9 loss to the Seattle Seahawks in the NFC Wildcard Game.

Robinson became an unrestricted free agent after the 2015 season and was not offered a new contract by the Minnesota Vikings. Robinson attended private visits and received contract offers from the Miami Dolphins and Tampa Bay Buccaneers. Pro Football Focus gave Robinson an overall grade of 62.1 in 2017.

=== Tampa Bay Buccaneers ===
==== 2016 ====
On March 14, 2016, the Tampa Bay Buccaneers signed Robinson to a one-year, $2 million contract with $500,000 guaranteed.

Throughout training camp, he participated in an open competition to name a starting cornerback against Brent Grimes, Vernon Hargreaves, Johnthan Banks, Alterraun Verner, Jude Adjei-Barimah, and Joel Ross. Head coach Dirk Koetter named Robinson the fifth cornerback on the depth chart, behind Brent Grimes, Vernon Hargreaves, Alterraun Verner, and Jude Adjei-Barimah.

He made his Buccaneers' regular season debut in their season-opening 31–24 victory at the Atlanta Falcons. In Week 10, Robinson recorded a season-high two solo tackles during a 36–10 victory against the Chicago Bears. He finished his first season with the Tampa Bay Buccaneers with 11 solo tackles in 16 games and appeared mostly on special teams.

==== 2017 ====
On March 12, 2017, the Tampa Bay Buccaneers signed Robinson to a two-year, $5 million contract that includes $3.25 million guaranteed and a signing bonus of $250,000.

During training camp, Robinson competed against Jude Adjei-Barimah, Robert McClain, Ryan Smith, Javien Elliott for the job as the third cornerback on the depth chart. Defensive coordinator Mike Smith elected to name Robinson a backup safety to begin the regular season. Robinson's teammates named him the special teams captain for the 2017 season.

On October 5, 2017, Robinson sustained a concussion during the first quarter of the Buccaneers' 19–14 loss to the New England Patriots in Week 5. He was sidelined for the next three games (Weeks 6–8). Robinson was sidelined for another two games (Weeks 13–14) after injuring his hamstring. On December 31, 2017, Robinson recorded a season-high three combined tackles during a 31–24 victory against the New Orleans Saints. He finished the season with five combined tackles (four solo) in 11 games and zero starts.

On September 1, 2018, Robinson was released by the Buccaneers.

=== New Orleans Saints ===
On October 4, 2018, Robinson was signed by the New Orleans Saints. He was released on December 27, 2018, but was re-signed four days later.

=== Jacksonville Jaguars ===
On July 25, 2019, Robinson was signed by the Jacksonville Jaguars.

On October 30, 2019, Robinson announced his retirement from the NFL.

== NFL career statistics ==
Legend
| **Bold** | Career high |

=== Regular season ===
| Year | Team | Games | | Tackles | | | | | Interceptions | | | | | Fumbles | | | |
| Year | Team | GP | GS | Cmb | Solo | Ast | Sck | TFL | Int | Yds | TD | Lng | PD | FF | FR | Yds | TD |
|---|---|---|---|---|---|---|---|---|---|---|---|---|---|---|---|---|---|
| 2012 | MIN | 16 | 6 | 56 | **52** | 4 | 0.0 | 0 | 2 | **68** | 0 | **44** | 3 | 0 | 0 | 0 | 0 |
| 2013 | MIN | 10 | 10 | **58** | 48 | **10** | 0.0 | **3** | 0 | 0 | 0 | 0 | 4 | **1** | 0 | 0 | 0 |
| 2014 | MIN | 16 | 5 | 40 | 38 | 2 | 0.0 | 0 | **3** | 22 | 0 | 23 | **8** | 0 | 0 | 0 | 0 |
| 2015 | MIN | 5 | 0 | 2 | 2 | 0 | 0.0 | 0 | 0 | 0 | 0 | 0 | 0 | 0 | 0 | 0 | 0 |
| 2016 | TAM | 16 | 0 | 12 | 12 | 0 | 0.0 | 0 | 0 | 0 | 0 | 0 | 0 | 0 | 0 | 0 | 0 |
| 2017 | TAM | 11 | 0 | 5 | 4 | 1 | 0.0 | 0 | 0 | 0 | 0 | 0 | 0 | **1** | 0 | 0 | 0 |
| 2018 | NOR | 11 | 0 | 6 | 4 | 2 | 0.0 | 0 | 0 | 0 | 0 | 0 | 0 | 0 | 0 | 0 | 0 |
| 2019 | JAX | 8 | 0 | 3 | 2 | 1 | 0.0 | 0 | 0 | 0 | 0 | 0 | 0 | 0 | 0 | 0 | 0 |
| Total | | 93 | 21 | 182 | 162 | 20 | 0.0 | 3 | 5 | 90 | 0 | 44 | 15 | 2 | 0 | 0 | 0 |

=== Postseason ===
| Year | Team | Games | | Tackles | | | | | Interceptions | | | | | Fumbles | | | |
| Year | Team | GP | GS | Cmb | Solo | Ast | Sck | TFL | Int | Yds | TD | Lng | PD | FF | FR | Yds | TD |
|---|---|---|---|---|---|---|---|---|---|---|---|---|---|---|---|---|---|
| 2012 | MIN | 1 | 0 | 1 | 1 | 0 | 0.0 | 0 | 0 | 0 | 0 | 0 | 0 | 0 | 0 | 0 | 0 |
| 2015 | MIN | 1 | 0 | **3** | **3** | 0 | 0.0 | 0 | 0 | 0 | 0 | 0 | 0 | 0 | 0 | 0 | 0 |
| 2018 | NOR | 2 | 0 | 0 | 0 | 0 | 0.0 | 0 | 0 | 0 | 0 | 0 | 0 | 0 | 0 | 0 | 0 |
| Total | | 4 | 0 | 4 | 4 | 0 | 0.0 | 0 | 0 | 0 | 0 | 0 | 0 | 0 | 0 | 0 | 0 |

== Personal life ==
On June 28, 2013, Josh and Julianna Robinson were married in a ceremony at the Westin Colannade in Coral Gables, Florida. They have two sons named Jesse and Judah Robinson. Judah Ace Robinson was born on July 15, 2016, and Jesse was born in the summer of 2014.

=== Social views ===
On June 26, 2015, Robinson publicly announced his beliefs opposing same-sex marriage. After the Supreme Court of the United States released their decision on Obergefell v. Hodges allowing same-sex marriages nationwide, Robinson made headlines when he compared same-sex marriage to incest and pedophilia in posts on his Twitter account. The following day, he apologized for his comments and attempted to clarify them in a statement through the Star-Tribune. He stated, "I apologize for any offense my tweets may have caused. In an attempt to express my beliefs, I created some confusion with my choice of words, and for that I apologize. I do not equate the Supreme Court’s decision on marriage equality with other social issues. There are obvious differences."
