= Ryan Smith (cornerback, born 1993) =

American football player (born 1993)

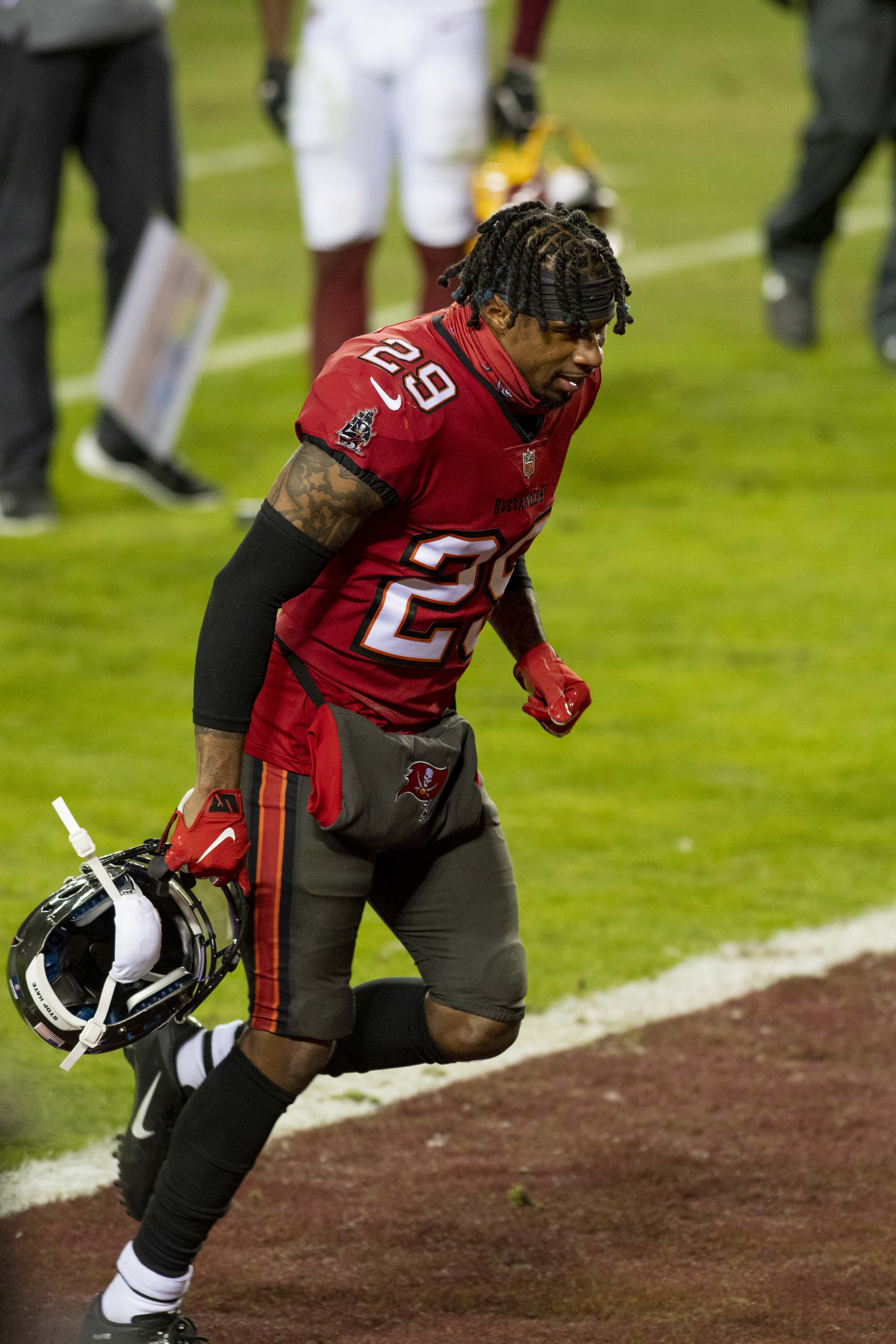
- Smith with the Tampa Bay Buccaneers in 2021

No. 29, 23, 33
- Position: Cornerback

Personal information
- Born: September 7, 1993 (age 33); Augsburg, Germany
- Listed height: 5 ft 11 in (1.80 m)
- Listed weight: 190 lb (86 kg)

Career information
- High school: Wise (Upper Marlboro, Maryland, U.S.)
- College: North Carolina Central (2012–2015)
- NFL draft: 2016: 4th round, 108th overall pick

Career history
- Tampa Bay Buccaneers (2016–2020); Los Angeles Chargers (2021); Indianapolis Colts (2022)*; Tampa Bay Buccaneers (2022)*
- * Offseason or practice squad member only

Awards and highlights
- Super Bowl champion (LV)

Career NFL statistics
- Total tackles: 122
- Forced fumbles: 4
- Fumble recoveries: 2
- Pass deflections: 12
- Interceptions: 1
- Stats at Pro Football Reference

Ryan Smith (born September 7, 1993) is an American former professional football player who was a cornerback in the National Football League (NFL). He played college football for the North Carolina Central Eagles. He was selected by the Tampa Bay Buccaneers in the fourth round of the 2016 NFL draft.

== Early life ==
Ryan Smith was born in Augsburg, Germany on September 7, 1993, to parents Reginald and Traci Smith, and raised in Clinton, Maryland, where he spent the majority of his childhood with his mother and stepfather Damon Richardson. He moved to nearby Upper Marlboro in his high school years, where he attended Dr. Henry A. Wise Jr. High School. His younger brother Tre Smith played defense at NCCU with him. In high school, Smith was a dual athlete playing football and basketball. He decided that football was the more logical sport to pursue in order to help his family pay for his college tuition. In a press conference shortly after he was drafted, Smith stated that if his plans of playing in the NFL hadn't come true, he would have joined the United States Marshals Service.

== College career ==
Smith attended North Carolina Central University (NCCU) from 2012 to 2015, playing in 45 games and starting 42. He set multiple team records for solo tackles (168) and kickoff return yard average (28.1). Among NCCU career leaders, Smith finished sixth in tackles (263) and tied for 11th in passes defended with 31 (7 interceptions, 24 pass break-ups).

In his freshman season, he was redshirted and played in all 11 games, starting 8 of them. Smith ended his freshman season as NCCU's second-leading tackler with 65 total takedowns, second in interceptions (3) and third with eight passes defended (3 interceptions, 5 pass break-ups). Smith was selected to the College Sports Journal Football Championship Subdivision Freshman All-America team.

Smith started all 12 games in his redshirt sophomore season. He ranked second on the Eagles and 19th in the Mid-Eastern Athletic Conference (MEAC) with 88 total tackles (51 solo). He was also ranked number one on the team and fourth in the MEAC with 3 fumble recoveries.

In his redshirt junior campaign, he started all 12 games, making the switch from safety to cornerback in his redshirt junior season. Smith tallied 58 total tackles and 44 solo tackles, which was second-best on the team. He was voted to the Preseason All-MEAC Third Team.

As a redshirt senior, Smith started in 10 of 11 games as a cornerback, only missing the game against the Bethune-Cookman Wildcats. He ended the year ranking third in the MEAC with a team-best 11 passes defended (2 interceptions and 9 pass break-ups), and a total of 52 tackles (ranking second on the team with 38 solo tackles). Smith led the conference and ranked 10th in the nation with an average of 28.1 yards per kickoff return (14 for 394 yards, 1 touchdown).

== Professional career ==
External videos
- Ryan Smith's NFL Combine Workout

Pre-draft measurables
Height	Weight	Arm length	Hand span	40-yard dash	10-yard split	20-yard split	20-yard shuttle	Three-cone drill	Vertical jump	Broad jump	Bench press
5 ft 11 in (1.80 m)	189 lb (86 kg)	30 1/2 in (0.77 m)	8 7/8 in (0.23 m)	4.47 s	1.59 s	2.64 s	4.09 s	6.88 s	36 in (0.91 m)	10 ft 2 in (3.10 m)	18 reps
All values from NFL Combine

=== Tampa Bay Buccaneers (first stint) ===
==== 2016 ====
The Tampa Bay Buccaneers selected Smith in the fourth round with the 108th overall pick in the 2016 NFL draft. Smith was the 18th cornerback drafted in 2016. On May 5, 2016, the Buccaneers signed Smith to a four-year, $2.93 million contract with a signing bonus of $592,161.

External videos
- Buccaneers draft Ryan Smith 106th overall

The team immediately converted Smith to safety. Throughout training camp, Smith competed for backup safety against Isaiah Johnson, Kimario McFadden, and Elijah Shumate. Head coach Dirk Koetter named Smith the backup free safety behind Bradley McDougald to begin the regular season. On September 25, Smith made his professional regular season debut as the Buccaneers lost 37–32 against the Los Angeles Rams in Week 3. In Week 9, he recorded his only tackle of the season during a 43–28 loss against the Atlanta Falcons. He finished his rookie season in 2016 recording one tackle in 14 games with zero starts.

==== 2017 ====
Following the 2016 season, the Buccaneers announced that Smith would be moved back to cornerback. During training camp, Smith competed to be the third cornerback on the depth chart against Javien Elliott, Jude Adjei-Barimah, Robert McClain, and Josh Robinson. HC Koetter named Smith to the roster spot to begin the regular season, behind Brent Grimes and Vernon Hargreaves.

On September 24, 2017, Smith earned his first career start in place of Grimes who was sidelined due to a shoulder injury. In the Buccaneers' 34–17 loss at the Minnesota Vikings, Smith finished with three solo tackles and one pass deflection. He started another two games in place of Grimes (Weeks 8–9) after the latter re-injured his shoulder. In Week 9, he collected a season-high nine combined tackles during a 30–10 loss at the New Orleans Saints. In Week 10, Grimes became a starting cornerback for the remainder of the season (as announced weeks later on December 20) after Hargreaves was placed on injured reserve with a hamstring injury; this move kept Smith as a starting cornerback. On November 26, Smith made a season-high eight solo tackles during a 34–20 loss at the Falcons in Week 12. Smith was inactive for the Buccaneers' Week 16 loss at the Carolina Panthers due to an ankle injury, but returned for the season finale the following week. He finished the 2017 NFL season with 62 combined tackles (51 solo), 5 pass deflections, and two forced fumbles in 15 games with 10 starts.

==== 2018 ====
Smith made the effort to retain his role as a starting cornerback during training camp, but saw heavy competition from Hargreaves, as well as the Buccaneers' second round selections in the 2018 NFL draft, M. J. Stewart and Carlton Davis. Koetter named Smith the fourth cornerback on the depth chart to start the regular season, behind Grimes, Hargreaves, and Davis.

In Week 2, Smith collected a season-high nine combined tackles and made two pass deflections during a 27–21 victory against the Philadelphia Eagles. On November 25, 2018, Smith broke up a pass attempt and made his first career interception as the Buccaneers defeated the San Francisco 49ers 27–9 in Week 12; Smith intercepted a pass from quarterback Nick Mullens intended for wide receiver Dante Pettis during the fourth quarter. Smith finished the season with 38 combined tackles (31 solo), 5 pass deflections, and 1 interception in 16 games with six starts.

==== 2019 ====
On July 10, 2019, it was announced Smith had been suspended for the first four games of the 2019 season for violating the NFL performance-enhancing substances policy. He was reinstated from suspension on September 30, and activated prior to Week 5.

==== 2020 ====
On March 30, 2020, Smith was re-signed by the Buccaneers. Smith played in all three games in the Buccaneers' playoff run, as well as Super Bowl LV which they won.

=== Los Angeles Chargers ===
On March 30, 2021, Smith signed with the Los Angeles Chargers. He was placed on injured reserve on September 6. He was activated on October 9. He suffered a torn ACL in Week 9 and was placed on injured reserve on November 13, where he remained the rest of the season.

=== Indianapolis Colts ===
On September 27, 2022, Smith was signed to the practice squad of the Indianapolis Colts. He was released on October 25.

=== Tampa Bay Buccaneers (second stint) ===
On October 31, 2022, Smith was signed to the Buccaneers' practice squad. He was released on December 6.

== Personal life ==
Smith is a Christian. Smith is a member of Kappa Alpha Psi fraternity.
