= Patrick Murray (American football) =

American football player (born 1991)

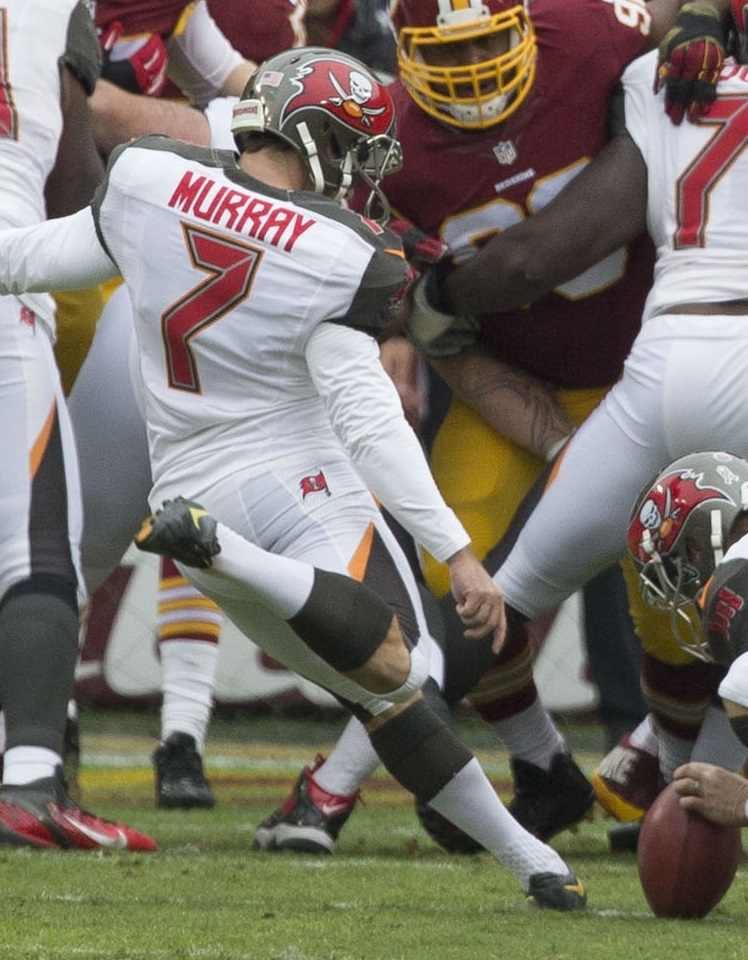
- Murray with the Tampa Bay Buccaneers in 2014

No. 7, 2
- Position: Placekicker

Personal information
- Born: June 22, 1991 (age 35); Mahwah, New Jersey, U.S.
- Listed height: 5 ft 7 in (1.70 m)
- Listed weight: 192 lb (87 kg)

Career information
- High school: Don Bosco Prep (Ramsey, New Jersey)
- College: Fordham
- NFL draft: 2013: undrafted

Career history
- Tampa Bay Buccaneers (2014–2015); Cleveland Browns (2016); New Orleans Saints (2017)*; Tampa Bay Buccaneers (2017)
- * Offseason or practice squad member only

Career NFL statistics
- Field goals made: 40
- Field goals attempted: 49
- Field goal %: 81.6
- Longest field goal: 55
- Touchbacks: 17
- Stats at Pro Football Reference

Patrick Murray (born June 22, 1991) is an American former professional football player who was a placekicker in the National Football League (NFL). He played college football for the Fordham Rams.

== College career ==
Murray was raised in Mahwah, New Jersey. After playing football for Don Bosco Preparatory High School, Murray considered attending college in Dublin, but decided to play at Fordham University, where he served as both punter and kicker. He appeared in 44 games in his four-year career (2009–2012) with the Rams, finishing with 186 punts for 7,985 yards and 38 made field goals on 54 attempts. As a senior, he was named a consensus first-team All-American kicker after connecting on 25–30 (83.3%) field goals, while punting 52 times for 2,392 yards.

== Professional career ==
=== Tampa Bay Buccaneers (first stint) ===
On December 31, 2013, the Tampa Bay Buccaneers signed Murray to a futures contract after the Buccaneers lost their last game of the 2013 season to the New Orleans Saints. He beat out veteran Connor Barth, who was released from the team August 29, 2014, when they made final roster cuts. Murray and Barth were both released September 4, 2015, from the Tampa Bay roster in favor of rookie kicker Kyle Brindza. On September 5, 2015, he was placed on injured reserve. On May 19, 2016, he was waived by the Buccaneers.

=== Cleveland Browns ===
On June 9, 2016, Murray signed with the Cleveland Browns. On September 11, 2016, Murray connected on his first field goal as a member of the Browns, a 35-yarder. On September 24, 2016, he was placed on injured reserve with a knee injury. He was released by the Browns on December 23, 2016.

=== New Orleans Saints ===
On August 6, 2017, Murray signed with the New Orleans Saints. He was waived on August 12, 2017.

=== Tampa Bay Buccaneers (second stint) ===
On October 9, 2017, Murray signed with the Buccaneers after Nick Folk missed three field goals the previous week.

== Personal life ==
Murray's family had a Gaelic football heritage, with his father Aidan and uncle Ciarán having both played for Monaghan GAA.
