= Maurice Fleming =

American football player and coach (born 1993)

Eastern Illinois Panthers
- Title: Defensive pass game coordinator & cornerbacks coach

Personal information
- Born: December 6, 1993 (age 32); Chicago, Illinois, U.S.
- Listed height: 5 ft 11 in (1.80 m)
- Listed weight: 202 lb (92 kg)

Career information
- High school: Curie Metropolitan (Chicago)
- College: Iowa (2012–2015); West Virginia (2016)
- NFL draft: 2017: undrafted

Career history

Playing
- Tampa Bay Buccaneers (2017–2018); Ottawa Redblacks (2019); Louisville Xtreme (2021)

Coaching
- Houston (2022) Graduate assistant; Eastern Illinois (2023) Cornerbacks coach; Eastern Illinois (2024–present) Defensive pass game coordinator and cornerbacks coach
- Stats at Pro Football Reference
- Stats at CFL.ca

Maurice Fleming (born December 6, 1993) is an American college football coach and former cornerback. He is the defensive pass game coordinator and cornerbacks coach for Eastern Illinois University, a position he has held since 2024. He played college football at West Virginia, and was signed by the Tampa Bay Buccaneers of the National Football League (NFL) as an undrafted free agent in 2017.

== College career ==
Fleming was a three-star recruit out of high school. He received offers from Wisconsin, Illinois, Indiana, and Boston College, but decided to enroll to Iowa. He later transferred to West Virginia.

== Professional career ==
=== Tampa Bay Buccaneers ===
Fleming signed with the Tampa Bay Buccaneers as an undrafted free agent on May 1, 2017. He was waived/injured on August 19, 2017, after being injured in a preseason game against the Jacksonville Jaguars and was placed on injured reserve. Five days later, the Buccaneers and Fleming reached an injury settlement, and he was released. He was re-signed to the Buccaneers' practice squad on November 29, 2017. He signed a reserve/future contract with the Buccaneers on January 3, 2018.

On June 15, 2018, Fleming was waived/injured by the Buccaneers and was placed on injured reserve. He was released on December 21, 2018.

=== Ottawa Redblacks ===
On July 22, 2019, Fleming signed with the Ottawa Redblacks of the Canadian Football League (CFL).

=== Louisville Xtreme ===
On March 24, 2021, Fleming signed with the Louisville Xtreme of the Indoor Football League (IFL).

== Coaching career ==
In 2022, Fleming joined Houston as a graduate assistant.

In 2023, Fleming was hired to be the cornerbacks coach for Eastern Illinois. In 2024, he was promoted to defensive pass game coordinator while retaining his role as cornerbacks coach.
