= Danny Breyer =

American football coach (born 1990)

Cleveland Browns
- Title: Pass game coordinator

Personal information
- Born: June 2, 1990 (age 36); Cincinnati, Ohio, U.S.

Career information
- High school: St. Xavier High School (Ohio)
- College: University of Akron

Career history
- Illinois (2009) Student assistant; Akron (2010–2011) Student assistant; Akron (2012) Defensive graduate assistant; Indiana (2013) Assistant to the head coach & assistant director of player personnel; Akron (2014) Graduate assistant; Tampa Bay Buccaneers (2016) Analytics assistant; Tampa Bay Buccaneers (2017–2018) Defensive assistant; Atlanta Falcons (2020–2021) Offensive assistant; Atlanta Falcons (2022) Run game specialist; Baltimore Ravens (2023) Offensive quality control coach; Baltimore Ravens (2024–2025) Offensive assistant; Cleveland Browns (2026–present) Pass game coordinator

Daniel John Breyer (born June 2, 1990) is an American football coach who is the pass game coordinator for the Cleveland Browns of the National Football League (NFL). He previously coached for the Baltimore Ravens, Atlanta Falcons, and Tampa Bay Buccaneers.

== Early life and education ==
Breyer was born in Cincinnati, Ohio, and attended St. Xavier High School in Cincinnati. He graduated from the University of Akron in 2011 with a bachelor's degree in history.

== Coaching career ==
=== College ===
Breyer began coaching as a student assistant at the University of Illinois in 2009, assisting with quarterbacks and defensive backs. He then worked at the University of Akron as a student assistant (2010–2011) and as a defensive graduate assistant in 2012, primarily with defensive backs. In 2013, he joined Indiana as assistant to head coach Kevin Wilson and assistant director of player personnel. He later returned to Akron as a graduate assistant in 2014 while pursuing his master's degree.

=== NFL ===
Breyer worked with the Miami Dolphins coaching staff during organized team activities (OTAs) in 2015. He entered the NFL coaching ranks with the Tampa Bay Buccaneers in 2016 as an analytics assistant, later serving as a defensive assistant coach from 2017 to 2018.

Breyer joined the Atlanta Falcons in 2020 as an offensive assistant and remained in that role through 2021, before serving as the team's run game specialist in 2022. The Browns later credited his Falcons tenure with contributions during a season in which rookie running back Tyler Allgeier rushed for 1,035 yards and Cordarrelle Patterson scored eight rushing touchdowns (2022).

In 2023, Breyer joined the Baltimore Ravens as an offensive quality control coach and was an offensive assistant coach from 2024 to 2025, working most closely with the tight ends. The Browns later cited that, during his Ravens tenure, Baltimore ranked among the NFL leaders in rushing yards per game, yards per game, and points per game, and that tight end Mark Andrews led NFL tight ends with 11 receiving touchdowns in 2024.

In 2026, Breyer was hired by the Cleveland Browns as pass game coordinator on head coach Todd Monken's staff.
