= Isaiah Johnson (safety, born October 1992) =

American football player (born 1992)

No. 39
- Position: Safety

Personal information
- Born: October 14, 1992 (age 34); Cary, North Carolina, U.S.
- Listed height: 6 ft 0 in (1.83 m)
- Listed weight: 209 lb (95 kg)

Career information
- High school: Panther Creek (Cary)
- College: South Carolina
- NFL draft: 2016: undrafted

Career history
- Tampa Bay Buccaneers (2016–2018); Winnipeg Blue Bombers (2020)*
- * Offseason or practice squad member only

Awards and highlights
- Big 12 Defensive Newcomer of the Year (2013)

Career NFL statistics
- Total tackles: 52
- Fumble recoveries: 2
- Pass deflections: 2
- Interceptions: 1
- Defensive touchdowns: 1
- Stats at Pro Football Reference

Isaiah Nigel Johnson (born October 14, 1992) is an American former professional football player who was a safety for the Tampa Bay Buccaneers of the National Football League (NFL). He played college football for the South Carolina Gamecocks and Kansas Jayhawks.

== College career ==
Initially Johnson attended Western Carolina but was granted a medical redshirt. In 2012 he played for Iowa Western Community College where he helped lead them to an NJCAA National Championship. Johnson then played at the University of Kansas. In 2013 Johnson played safety for the Jayhawks and finished second on the team in tackles with 73 total tackles, and also had 5 interceptions. Johnson was named Big 12 Defensive Newcomer of the Year. In 2014, Johnson was second on the team in tackles again with 75 total tackles, and also had 1 interception. Johnson graduated from Kansas with a degree in sociology and then transferred to the University of South Carolina to play college football for his final season of eligibility. At South Carolina in 2015, Johnson was named one of the Gamecocks' team captains. He finished his final season of college football at South Carolina as the second leading tackler with 74 tackles and an interception.

Overall, Johnson started all 36 of his career Division I college football games.

== Professional career ==
Pre-draft measurables
Height	Weight	Arm length	Hand span	Wingspan	40-yard dash	10-yard split	20-yard split	20-yard shuttle	Three-cone drill	Vertical jump	Broad jump	Bench press
5 ft 11 3/4 in (1.82 m)	212 lb (96 kg)	32 5/8 in (0.83 m)	9 3/4 in (0.25 m)	6 ft 5 3/4 in (1.97 m)	4.79 s	1.68 s	2.75 s	4.30 s	7.07 s	30.5 in (0.77 m)	9 ft 7 in (2.92 m)	18 reps
All values from Pro Day

=== Tampa Bay Buccaneers ===
Johnson was signed by the Tampa Bay Buccaneers as an undrafted free agent on May 2, 2016. He was released on September 3, 2016, during final roster cuts and was signed to the practice squad. He spent the entire season on the practice squad and signed a reserve/future contract with the Buccaneers on January 2, 2017.

On September 2, 2017, Johnson was waived by the Buccaneers and was signed to the practice squad the next day. He was promoted to the active roster on October 5, 2017. He was waived on October 24, 2017, and re-signed to the practice squad. He was promoted back to the active roster on December 20, 2017.

On August 31, 2019, Johnson was released by the Buccaneers.

=== Winnipeg Blue Bombers ===
Johnson signed with the Winnipeg Blue Bombers of the Canadian Football League (CFL) on February 28, 2020. After the CFL canceled the 2020 season due to the COVID-19 pandemic, Johnson chose to opt-out of his contract with the Blue Bombers on August 27, 2020.
