= Robert McClain =

American football player (born 1988)

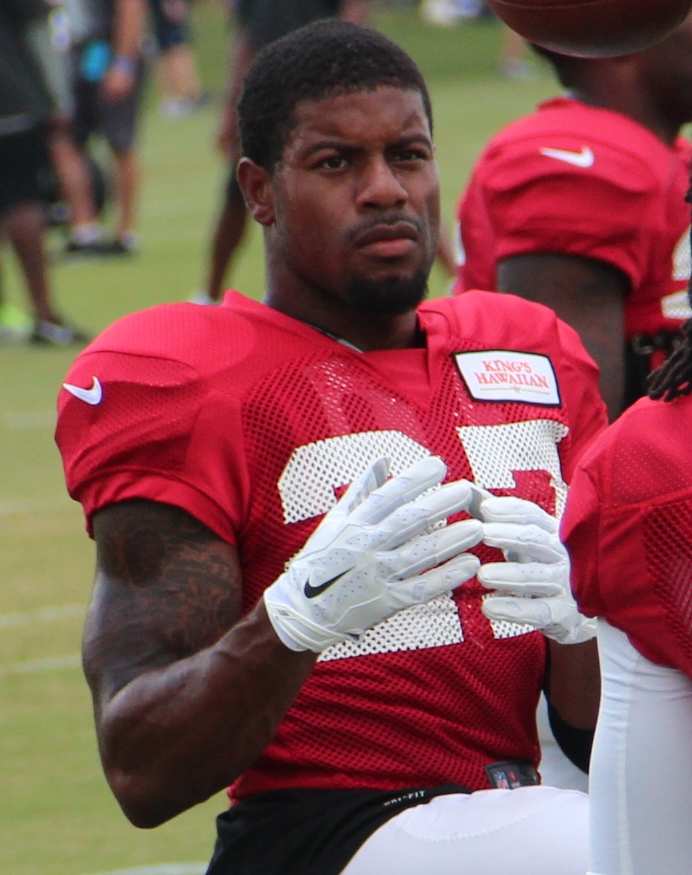
- McClain with the Atlanta Falcons in 2014

No. 36, 27, 35
- Position: Cornerback

Personal information
- Born: July 22, 1988 (age 38); Philadelphia, Pennsylvania, U.S.
- Listed height: 5 ft 9 in (1.75 m)
- Listed weight: 180 lb (82 kg)

Career information
- High school: Patuxent (Lusby, Maryland)
- College: Connecticut (2006–2009)
- NFL draft: 2010: 7th round, 249th overall pick

Career history
- Carolina Panthers (2010); Jacksonville Jaguars (2011); Atlanta Falcons (2012–2014); New England Patriots (2015)*; Carolina Panthers (2015–2016); San Diego Chargers (2016); Tampa Bay Buccaneers (2017)
- * Offseason or practice squad member only

Career NFL statistics
- Total tackles: 298
- Sacks: 2.5
- Forced fumbles: 2
- Fumble recoveries: 5
- Interceptions: 7
- Defensive touchdowns: 1
- Stats at Pro Football Reference

Robert "Reggie" McClain (born July 22, 1988) is an American former professional football player who was a cornerback in the National Football League (NFL).

McClain was a cornerback, punt returner, and kick returner playing college football for the Connecticut Huskies. He was a co-captain in 2009 and was selected as All-Big East Second-team cornerback by the coaches and first-team Big East as a punt returner. He received the Brian Kozlowski Award, named for the former Husky tight end and 13-year NFL veteran. McClain finished his senior season with 60 tackles, four interceptions, three pass breakups and a fumble recovery on defense, and stepped in as the punt returner halfway through the season running back 15 punts for a Big East leading 222 yards and a touchdown. McClain was selected by the Carolina Panthers in the seventh round of the 2010 NFL draft.

== Early life ==
McClain was an All-State selection at Patuxent High School in Lusby, Maryland, under head coach Steve Crounse. McClain was named first-team All-Metro by the Washington Post as a cornerback, named All-League as both a running back and a cornerback as a senior and all league cornerback as a junior. He rushed for 1,105 yards and 12 touchdowns, caught 25 passes for 421 yards and four touchdowns, and returned five kickoffs for touchdowns in 2005, one short of the national single season record. McClain also returned a punt 98 yards for a touchdown, intercepted six passes in 2005, broke up 19 others, and made 53 tackles. He attended high school with former UConn tailback Terry Caulley. He attended Eaglecrest High School in Aurora, Colorado in 2002-2003, where he played as a starting running back. He then later attended Patuxent High School for the remainder of his high school career.

== College career ==
=== 2006 season ===
McClain played in the final seven games on special teams returning 13 kickoffs for an average of 19.0 yards and two punts. He made five tackles in coverage, four of them solo tackles, and was named the Offensive Scout Team Player of the Week on three occasions.

=== 2007 season ===
McClain played corner back and on special teams in 13 games. He recovered a fumble at Pittsburgh and recorded his first career interception against Maine. He made five tackles at West Virginia, four tackles and an interception in a win over Rutgers, and intercepted an end zone pass in the against University of South Florida. He became a starter in the final regular season game at West Virginia University and was a nickel back for much of the season finishing with 30 tackles (19 solo), three interceptions and three other pass breakups.

=== 2008 season ===
In the 2008 season, McClain intercepted two Cincinnati passes, returning one for a touchdown to help secure a victory. He started against Syracuse November 15 after an injury to Darius Butler and returned an interception 37 yards for a touchdown. He played in all 13 games with four starts, recorded 30 tackles on the season and led the team in tackles in an International Bowl victory over Buffalo University January 3 with eight (including 3.5 tackles for a loss). He accumulated a total of three interceptions on the season, 5.5 tackles for a loss, five pass breakups, a quarterback hurry.

=== 2009 season ===
McClain was tied for second best with 4 interceptions in the Big East, was third on his team with 60 tackles in regular season play, and was considered a prospect for the NFL draft. In 10 games he returned 15 punts for 222 yards, an average return of 14.8 yards, including one returned for a touchdown. He also returned two kickoffs for 24 yards. He intercepted 10 passes during his career at UConn.

After a performance in the PapaJohns.com Bowl at Legion Field where McClain was "seemingly was everywhere on defense and special teams Saturday in the Huskies’ 20-7 win over South Carolina", with four tackles, two tackles for loss, three pass breakups" and impressive punt returns, McClain said he will be trying for a pro football career. "I’m praying to God it happens so I can continue playing football and work hard. Hopefully I get invited somewhere. If it works out, it works out, great. If it doesn’t, it’s the military. I’m going to the Marines. I’ve got to have a plan in case football doesn’t work out." McClain also said he would remember the season, his coaches and his teammate and friend "Jazz" (Jasper Howard) who died in a stabbing during the season for the rest of his life.

== Professional career ==
=== Carolina Panthers (first stint) ===
McClain was drafted in the seventh round, 249th overall pick by the Carolina Panthers in the 2010 NFL draft. On September 3, 2011, he was released on the day of final roster cuts.

=== Jacksonville Jaguars ===
On December 12, 2011, McClain signed with the Jacksonville Jaguars. On December 30, 2011, he was released after the team claimed offensive tackle William Robinson off waivers.

=== Atlanta Falcons ===
McClain had a standout season in 2012 for the Atlanta Falcons. After cutting Dunta Robinson, and letting Chris Owens and Brent Grimes walk to the Cleveland Browns and the Miami Dolphins, respectively, in free agency, McClain reprised his role in the nickel spot behind Asante Samuel and Desmond Trufant in 2013. He intercepted Drew Brees in Week 1 of the 2014 season.

=== New England Patriots ===
McClain signed with the New England Patriots on March 18, 2015. He was released by the Patriots on September 5, 2015.

=== Carolina Panthers (second stint) ===
On December 15, 2015, McClain re-signed with the Panthers and became a starter. On February 7, 2016, he was part of the Panthers team that played in Super Bowl 50. In the game, the Panthers fell to the Denver Broncos by a score of 24–10.

McClain was released by the Panthers on December 9, 2016.

=== San Diego Chargers ===
McClain was claimed off waivers by the Chargers on December 12, 2016.

=== Tampa Bay Buccaneers ===
On May 10, 2017, McClain signed with the Tampa Bay Buccaneers. On September 17, 2017, in Week 2 against the Chicago Bears, he intercepted quarterback Mike Glennon and ran the ball back 47 yards for a touchdown.

=== NFL statistics ===
Year	Team	GP	COMB	TOTAL	AST	SACK	FF	FR	FR YDS	INT	IR YDS	AVG IR	LNG	TD	PD
2010	CAR	16	16	14	2	0.0	0	0	0	0	0	0	0	0	1
2011	CAR	0	Did not play												
2012	ATL	15	61	53	8	0.0	0	2	28	1	32	32	32	0	10
2013	ATL	16	65	55	10	1.0	2	1	0	0	0	0	0	0	5
2014	ATL	16	59	49	10	1.0	0	0	0	2	5	3	5	0	5
2015	CAR	3	7	4	3	0.0	0	0	0	1	24	24	24	0	1
2016	CAR	11	21	17	0.5	0	0	0	0	0	0	0	0	0	1
2016	SD	3	1	1	0	0.0	0	0	0	0	0	0	0	0	0
2017	TB	14	50	41	9	0.0	0	0	0	3	53	17.7	47	1	5
Career		94	298	239	59	2.5	2	3	0	7	114	16.3	47	1	28
