= Javien Elliott =

American football player (born 1993)

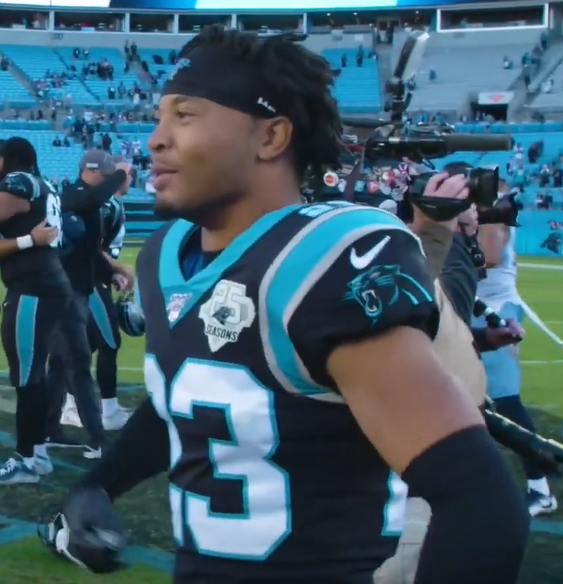
- Elliott with the Carolina Panthers in 2019

No. 7
- Position: Defensive back

Personal information
- Born: July 18, 1993 (age 33); Panama City, Florida, U.S.
- Listed height: 5 ft 11 in (1.80 m)
- Listed weight: 185 lb (84 kg)

Career information
- High school: Rutherford (Panama City)
- College: Florida State
- NFL draft: 2016: undrafted

Career history
- Tampa Bay Buccaneers (2016–2018); Carolina Panthers (2019); Calgary Stampeders (2021–2022); Hamilton Tiger-Cats (2023)

Career NFL statistics
- Total tackles: 77
- Sacks: 0.5
- Pass deflections: 4
- Interceptions: 2
- Stats at Pro Football Reference

Javien Elliott (born July 18, 1993) is an American former professional football player who was a defensive back in the National Football League (NFL) and Canadian Football League (CFL). He played college football for the Florida State Seminoles.

== College career ==
After receiving little attention from college football recruiters in high school, Elliott enrolled at Florida State University after a year at Tallahassee Community College and walked-on to the football team. He spent his first two seasons playing on the team's scout team and earned a scholarship going into his senior season. As a senior, Elliott played in 12 games and started the final six of his career.

== Professional career ==
=== Tampa Bay Buccaneers ===
Elliott signed with the Tampa Bay Buccaneers as an undrafted free agent on May 26, 2016. He was released on September 3, 2016 and was signed to their practice squad the next day. He was promoted to the active roster on November 22, 2016.

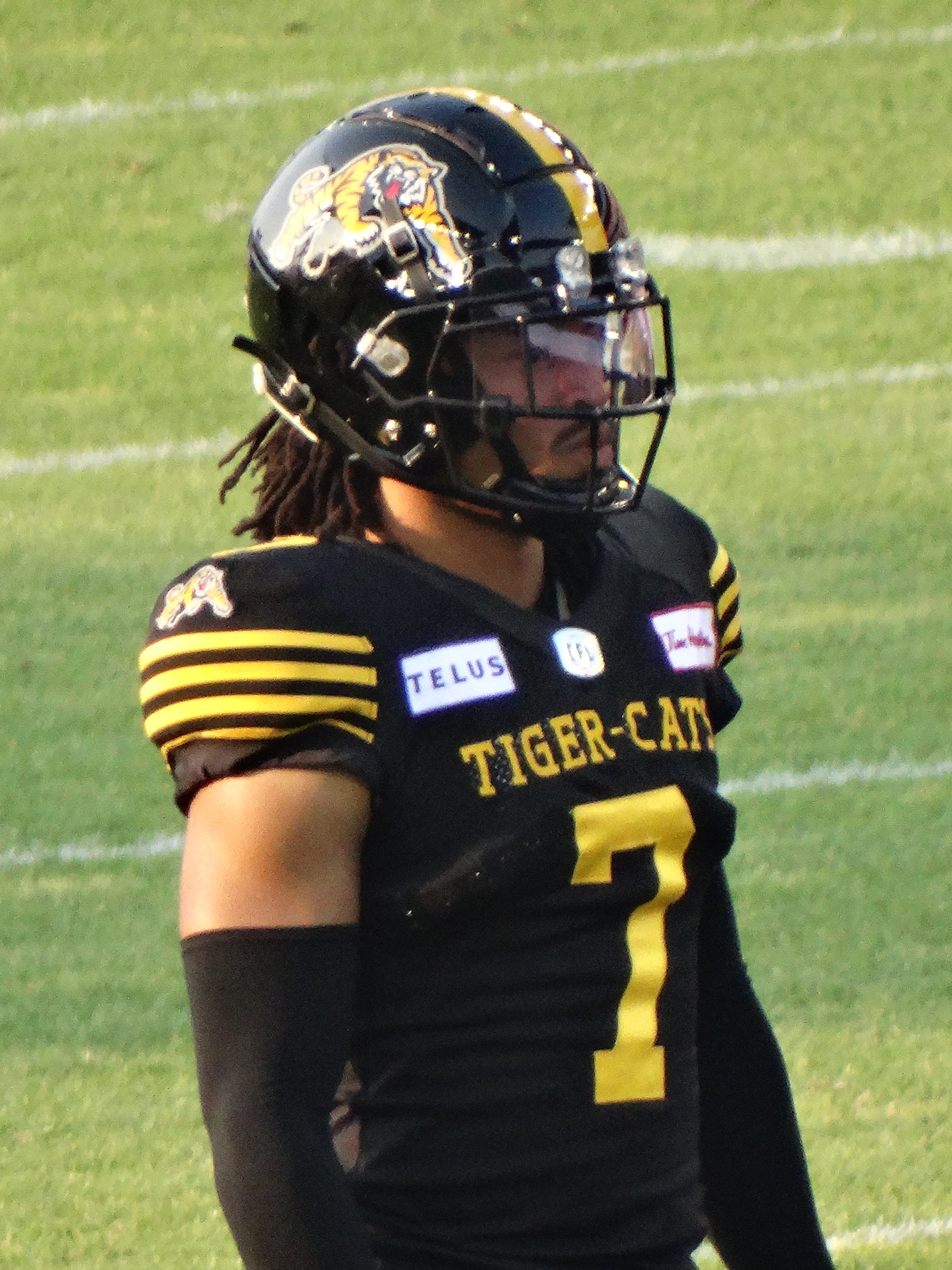
Elliott with the Hamilton Tiger-Cats in 2023

Elliott appeared in 15 games during the 2017 season with the Buccaneers.

On September 1, 2018, Elliott was waived by the Buccaneers and was re-signed to the practice squad. He was promoted to the active roster on September 8, 2018. On October 23, 2018, Elliot was waived by the Buccaneers and was re-signed to the practice squad. He was again promoted to the active roster on October 31, 2018.

=== Carolina Panthers ===
On June 5, 2019, Elliott signed with the Carolina Panthers. In week 6 against his former team, the Buccaneers, Elliott recorded an interception off Jameis Winston in the 37–26 win.

=== Calgary Stampeders ===
On September 20, 2021, Elliott signed with the Calgary Stampeders of the Canadian Football League (CFL). He played for two seasons with the Stampeders and became a free agent upon the expiry of his contract on February 14, 2023.

=== Hamilton Tiger-Cats ===
On February 14, 2023, it was announced that Elliott had signed with the Hamilton Tiger-Cats of the CFL. He retired on May 10, 2024.
