= Jude Adjei-Barimah =

Italian-American football player (born 1992)

Profile
- Position: Cornerback

Personal information
- Born: July 21, 1992 (age 34); Pordenone, Italy
- Listed height: 5 ft 11 in (1.80 m)
- Listed weight: 200 lb (91 kg)

Career information
- High school: Columbus (OH) Northland
- College: Bowling Green
- NFL draft: 2015: undrafted

Career history
- Tampa Bay Buccaneers (2015–2017); San Diego Fleet (2019)

Career NFL statistics
- Total tackles: 62
- Sacks: 2
- Forced fumbles: 1
- Pass deflections: 3
- Stats at Pro Football Reference

Jude Adjei-Barimah (born July 21, 1992) is an Italian former American football cornerback. He played college football at Bowling Green.

== Early life ==
Adjei-Barimah was born in Pordenone, Italy to Samuel Adjei and Agartha Boateng, before moving to Columbus, Ohio at the age of 9. Growing up in Italy, Adjei-Barimah played soccer.

== Professional career ==
=== Tampa Bay Buccaneers ===
Adjei-Barimah signed with the Tampa Bay Buccaneers on July 29, 2015.

Adjei-Barimah was suspended for four games on November 22, 2016 for violating the league's policy on performance-enhancing substances.

On February 27, 2017, Adjei-Barimah signed a one-year contract tender with the Buccaneers. He was waived/injured by the Buccaneers on August 22, after suffering a patellar fracture and was placed on injured reserve.

=== San Diego Fleet ===
In 2019, Adjei-Barimah joined the San Diego Fleet of the Alliance of American Football. After suffering an injury in the 2019 AAF season opener against the San Antonio Commanders, he missed the next three games before being placed on injured reserve on March 4. The league ceased operations in April 2019.

On October 16, 2019, Adjei-Barimah was drafted in the 4th round during phase four in the 2020 XFL draft by the Tampa Bay Vipers.
