= 2017 New Orleans Saints season =

NFL team season

- Owner: Tom Benson
- General manager: Mickey Loomis
- Head coach: Sean Payton
- Offensive coordinator: Pete Carmichael Jr.
- Defensive coordinator: Dennis Allen
- Home stadium: Mercedes-Benz Superdome

Results
- Record: 11–5
- Division place: 1st NFC South
- Playoffs: Won Wild Card Playoffs (vs. Panthers) 31–26; Lost Divisional Playoffs (at Vikings) 24–29
- All-Pros: 2: DE Cameron Jordan (1st team); FLEX Alvin Kamara (2nd team)
- Pro Bowlers: 7: QB Drew Brees; RB Mark Ingram II; RB Alvin Kamara; WR Michael Thomas; G Larry Warford; DE Cameron Jordan; CB Marshon Lattimore

Uniform
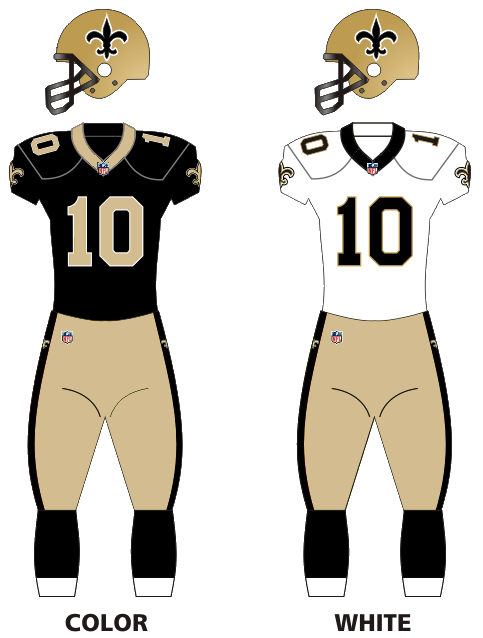

The 2017 season was the New Orleans Saints' 51st in the National Football League (NFL), their 42nd playing home games at the Mercedes-Benz Superdome and their 11th under head coach Sean Payton. Thanks to a significantly improved defense and consistent quality on offense, the team improved on their 7–9 output from the previous three seasons, while achieving an eight-game winning streak after losing their first two contests, their longest streak (tied with their 2011 team) since 2009, when they won Super Bowl XLIV. In Week 13 the Saints clinched their first winning season since 2013 and swept the Carolina Panthers for the first time since 2011. In Week 16, the Saints clinched a playoff spot for the first time since 2013 by defeating the Atlanta Falcons. In Week 17, the Saints clinched the NFC South for the first time since 2011 with the Panthers loss to the Falcons. This was the first of four consecutive NFC South titles for the Saints. On January 7, 2018 the Saints played their divisional rival Carolina Panthers in the playoffs for the first time in franchise history. They beat Carolina 31–26 in the Wild Card, but lost 29–24 to the Minnesota Vikings in the Divisional Round in a shocking ending.

This year was Tom Benson's final season as owner of the Saints, as he died at the age of 90 on March 15, 2018 from influenza.

== Offseason ==
=== Signings ===
Position	Player	Age	2016 Team	Contract
OG	Larry Warford	25	Detroit Lions	4 years, $34 million
DT	Nick Fairley	29	New Orleans Saints	4 years, $28 million
LB	A. J. Klein	25	Carolina Panthers	4 years, $24 million
WR	Ted Ginn Jr.	32	Carolina Panthers	3 years, $11 million
RB	Adrian Peterson	32	Minnesota Vikings	2 years, $7 million
LB	Manti Te'o	26	San Diego Chargers	2 years, $5 million
OLB	Alex Okafor	26	Arizona Cardinals	1 year, $2 million
DE	Darryl Tapp	32	New Orleans Saints	1 year, $1 million
TE	John Phillips	29	New Orleans Saints	1 year, $980,000
CB	Sterling Moore	27	New Orleans Saints	1 year, $900,000
QB	Chase Daniel	30	Philadelphia Eagles	1 year, $900,000
FS	Rafael Bush	29	Detroit Lions	1 year, $855,000
RB	Travaris Cadet	28	New Orleans Saints	1 year, $855,000

=== Releases ===
Position	Player	Age	2017 Team
OLB	Kasim Edebali	27	Denver Broncos
RB	Tim Hightower	30	San Francisco 49ers
G	Tim Lelito	27	Tennessee Titans
CB	B. W. Webb	27	Chicago Bears
S	Jairus Byrd	30	Carolina Panthers
DE	Paul Kruger	31	TBD
SS	Roman Harper	34	TBD
OG	Jahri Evans	33	Green Bay Packers
CB	Kyle Wilson	29	TBD

== Draft ==
2017 New Orleans Saints draft
Round	Selection	Player	Position	College
1	11	Marshon Lattimore	CB	Ohio State
1	32	Ryan Ramczyk	OT	Wisconsin
2	42	Marcus Williams	FS	Utah
3	67	Alvin Kamara	RB	Tennessee
3	76	Alex Anzalone	OLB	Florida
3	103	Trey Hendrickson	DE	Florida Atlantic
6	196	Al-Quadin Muhammad	DE	Miami

== Staff ==
2017 New Orleans Saints staff
Front office: Owner – Tom Benson; President – Dennis Lauscha; Executive vice president/general manager – Mickey Loomis; Asst general manager/college scouting director – Jeff Ireland; Vice president of football administration – Khai Harley; Director of operations – James Nagaoka; Director of pro scouting – Terry Fontenot; Head coaches: Head coach – Sean Payton; Assistant head coach/tight ends – Dan Campbell; Assistant to the head coach – Kevin Petry; Offensive coaches: Offensive coordinator – Pete Carmichael; Quarterbacks – Joe Lombardi; Running backs – Joel Thomas; Senior offensive assistant/wide receivers – Curtis Johnson; Assistant wide receivers – Ronald Curry; Offensive line – Dan Roushar; Assistant offensive line – Brendan Nugent; Offensive assistant – Joe Brady	Defensive coaches: Defensive coordinator – Dennis Allen; Defensive line – Ryan Nielsen; Linebackers – Mike Nolan; Secondary – Aaron Glenn; Senior defensive assistant – Peter Giunta; Defensive assistant/linebackers – Michael Hodges; Defensive assistant – Leigh Torrence; Pass rush specialist – Brian Young; Special teams coaches: Special teams coordinator – Bradford Banta; Assistant special teams – Kevin O'Dea; Strength and conditioning: Head strength and conditioning – Dan Dalrymple; Assistant strength and conditioning – Charles Byrd; Assistant strength and conditioning – Rob Wenning

== Final roster ==
2017 New Orleans Saints roster
Quarterbacks (QB): 9 Drew Brees; 10 Chase Daniel; 7 Taysom Hill; Running backs (RB): 33 Trey Edmunds; 22 Mark Ingram; 41 Alvin Kamara; 42 Zach Line FB; 27 Jonathan Williams; Wide receivers (WR): 80 Austin Carr; 16 Brandon Coleman; 19 Ted Ginn Jr.; 11 Tommylee Lewis; 83 Willie Snead; 13 Michael Thomas; Tight ends (TE): 45 Garrett Griffin; 89 Josh Hill; 84 Michael Hoomanawanui	Offensive linemen (OL): 72 Terron Armstead LT; 77 John Fullington G; 65 Senio Kelemete G; 61 Josh LeRibeus G; 75 Andrus Peat G; 71 Ryan Ramczyk RT; 63 Cameron Tom C; 60 Max Unger C; 67 Larry Warford G; Defensive linemen (DL): 95 Tyeler Davison DT; 91 Trey Hendrickson DE; 90 George Johnson DE; 94 Cameron Jordan DE; 76 Tony McDaniel DT; 97 Al-Quadin Muhammad DE; 93 David Onyemata DT; 98 Sheldon Rankins DT	Linebackers (LB): 58 Kasim Edebali OLB; 55 Jonathan Freeny OLB; 50 Gerald Hodges OLB; 56 Michael Mauti OLB; 52 Craig Robertson OLB; 51 Manti Te'o MLB; Defensive backs (DB): 31 Chris Banjo SS; 48 Vonn Bell FS; 25 Rafael Bush FS; 20 Ken Crawley CB; 34 Justin Hardee CB; 23 Marshon Lattimore CB; 37 Arthur Maulet CB; 24 Sterling Moore CB; 43 Marcus Williams FS; 26 P. J. Williams CB; Special teams (ST): 3 Wil Lutz K; 6 Thomas Morstead P; 49 Zach Wood LS	Practice squad: 99 Adam Bighill OLB; 14 Travin Dural WR; 81 Alex Ellis TE; 96 Woodrow Hamilton DT; 21 De'Vante Harris CB; 69 Gabe Ikard C; 74 Alex Jenkins DE (IPP); 59 Shayne Skov OLB; 62 Nate Theaker G; 28 Mykkele Thompson FS; 78 Landon Turner G; Reserve: 66 Jack Allen C (IR); 47 Alex Anzalone OLB (IR); 85 Dan Arnold WR (IR); 40 Delvin Breaux CB (IR); 90 Nick Fairley DT (NF-Ill.); 82 Coby Fleener TE (IR); 80 Clay Harbor TE (IR); 92 John Hughes DT (IR); 44 Hau'oli Kikaha OLB (IR); 53 A. J. Klein OLB (IR); 29 John Kuhn FB (IR); 36 Daniel Lasco RB (IR); 68 Devaroe Lawrence DT (NF-Inj.); 70 Mitchell Loewen DE (IR); 57 Alex Okafor DE (IR); 58 David Parry DT (IR); 64 Zach Strief T (IR); 54 Nate Stupar MLB (IR); 32 Kenny Vaccaro SS (IR); Rookies in italics 53 active, 19 reserve, 11 practice squad

== Preseason ==
After three years of holding training camp at The Greenbrier resort in West Virginia, the Saints opted to move camp back to the team's headquarters facility in Metairie, Louisiana.

Week	Date	Opponent	Result	Record	Game site	NFL.com recap
1	August 10	at Cleveland Browns	L 14–20	0–1	FirstEnergy Stadium	Recap
2	August 20	at Los Angeles Chargers	W 13–7	1–1	StubHub Center	Recap
3	August 26	Houston Texans	W 13–0	2–1	Mercedes-Benz Superdome	Recap
4	August 31	Baltimore Ravens	L 13–14	2–2	Mercedes-Benz Superdome	Recap

== Regular season ==
=== Schedule ===
On December 13, 2016, the NFL announced that the Saints will play the Miami Dolphins as one of the London Games at Wembley Stadium in London, England, with the Dolphins serving as the home team. The game will occur during Week 4 (Sunday, October 1), and will be televised in the United States. The network and time will be announced in conjunction with the release of the regular season schedule.

The Saints' 2017 schedule was revealed on April 20.

Week	Date	Opponent	Result	Record	Game site	NFL.com recap
1	September 11	at Minnesota Vikings	**L** 19–29	0–1	U.S. Bank Stadium	Recap
2	September 17	New England Patriots	**L** 20–36	0–2	Mercedes-Benz Superdome	Recap
3	September 24	at **Carolina Panthers**	**W** 34–13	1–2	Bank of America Stadium	Recap
4	October 1	at Miami Dolphins	**W** 20–0	2–2	(United Kingdom) Wembley Stadium (London)	Recap
5	Bye					
6	October 15	Detroit Lions	**W** 52–38	3–2	Mercedes-Benz Superdome	Recap
7	October 22	at Green Bay Packers	**W** 26–17	4–2	Lambeau Field	Recap
8	October 29	Chicago Bears	**W** 20–12	5–2	Mercedes-Benz Superdome	Recap
9	November 5	**Tampa Bay Buccaneers**	**W** 30–10	6–2	Mercedes-Benz Superdome	Recap
10	November 12	at Buffalo Bills	**W** 47–10	7–2	New Era Field	Recap
11	November 19	Washington Redskins	**W** 34–31 (OT)	8–2	Mercedes-Benz Superdome	Recap
12	November 26	at Los Angeles Rams	**L** 20–26	8–3	Los Angeles Memorial Coliseum	Recap
13	December 3	**Carolina Panthers**	**W** 31–21	9–3	Mercedes-Benz Superdome	Recap
14	December 7	at **Atlanta Falcons**	**L** 17–20	9–4	Mercedes-Benz Stadium	Recap
15	December 17	New York Jets	**W** 31–19	10–4	Mercedes-Benz Superdome	Recap
16	December 24	**Atlanta Falcons**	**W** 23–13	11–4	Mercedes-Benz Superdome	Recap
17	December 31	at **Tampa Bay Buccaneers**	**L** 24–31	11–5	Raymond James Stadium	Recap

Note: Intra-division opponents are in bold text.

=== Game summaries ===
==== Week 1: at Minnesota Vikings ====
Week One: New Orleans Saints at Minnesota Vikings – Game summary

Quarter	1	2	3	4	Total
Saints	3	3	3	10	**19**
**Vikings**	3	13	3	10	**29**

at U.S. Bank Stadium, Minneapolis, Minnesota

- Date: September 11
- Game time: 6:10 p.m. CDT
- Game weather: Played indoors (dome stadium)
- Referee: Gene Steratore
- TV announcers (ESPN): Sean McDonough, Jon Gruden and Lisa Salters
- Recap, Gamebook

Game information

First quarter

- NO – Wil Lutz 43-yard field goal, 8:21. Saints 3–0. **Drive: 13 plays, 56 yards, 6:39.**
- MIN – Kai Forbath 24-yard field goal, 1:01. Tied 3–3. **Drive: 14 plays, 78 yards, 7:20.**

Second quarter

- NO – Wil Lutz 21-yard field goal, 5:26. Saints 6–3. **Drive: 13 plays, 74 yards, 6:49.**
- MIN – Stefon Diggs 18-yard pass from Sam Bradford (Kai Forbath kick), 4:08. Vikings 10–6. **Drive: 3 plays, 74 yards, 1:18.**
- MIN – Stefon Diggs 2-yard pass from Sam Bradford (kick failed, wide right), 0:03. Vikings 16–6. **Drive: 10 plays, 95 yards, 1:40.**

Third quarter

- MIN – Kai Forbath 32-yard field goal, 11:07. Vikings 19–6. **Drive: 8 plays, 54 yards, 3:53.**
- NO – Wil Lutz 24-yard field goal, 2:43. Vikings 19–9. **Drive: 8 plays, 83 yards, 2:46.**

Fourth quarter

- MIN – Kyle Rudolph 15-yard pass from Sam Bradford (Kai Forbath kick), 12:52. Vikings 26–9. **Drive: 9 plays, 89 yards, 4:51.**
- NO – Wil Lutz 20-yard field goal, 7:49. Vikings 26–12. **Drive: 12 plays, 73 yards, 5:03.**
- MIN – Kai Forbath 45-yard field goal, 4:00. Vikings 29–12. **Drive: 8 plays, 48 yards, 3:49.**
- NO – Coby Fleener 8-yard pass from Drew Brees (Wil Lutz kick), 1:56. Vikings 29–19. **Drive: 8 plays, 75 yards, 2:04.**

Top passers

- NO – Drew Brees – 27/37, 291 yards, TD
- MIN – Sam Bradford – 27/32, 346 yards, 3 TD

Top rushers

- NO – Adrian Peterson – 6 rushes, 18 yards
- MIN – Dalvin Cook – 22 rushes, 127 yards

Top receivers

- NO – Coby Fleener – 5 receptions, 54 yards, TD
- MIN – Adam Thielen – 9 receptions, 157 yards

**Top tacklers**

- NO – A. J. Klein - 8 tackles, 3 assists
- MIN – Trae Waynes - 9 tackles, 2 assists

In a playoff preview between these 2 teams, the Saints lost to the Vikings by a score of 29-19. Despite having a 6-3 lead at one time, the Saints were outscored 26-16 for the remainder of the game. With the loss, the Saints began the season 0-1 for the 4th straight season. It was also running back Adrian Peterson's first time playing in Minneapolis since leaving the Vikings via free agency in the offseason.

==== Week 2: vs. New England Patriots ====
Week Two: New England Patriots at New Orleans Saints – Game summary

Quarter	1	2	3	4	Total
**Patriots**	20	10	3	3	**36**
Saints	3	10	0	7	**20**

at Mercedes-Benz Superdome, New Orleans, Louisiana

- Date: September 17
- Game time: 12:00 pm. CDT
- Game weather: Played indoors (dome stadium)
- Game attendance: 73,168
- Referee: Craig Wrolstad
- TV announcers (CBS): Jim Nantz, Tony Romo and Tracy Wolfson
- Recap, Gamebook

Game information

**First quarter**

- NE – Rex Burkhead 19-yard pass from Tom Brady (kick failed, hit left upright), 10:31. Patriots 6–0. **Drive: 10 plays, 75 yards, 4:29.**
- NO – Wil Lutz 46-yard field goal, 7:43. Patriots 6–3. **Drive: 7 plays, 34 yards, 2:53.**
- NE – Rob Gronkowski 53-yard pass from Tom Brady (Stephen Gostkowski kick), 5:42. Patriots 13–3. **Drive: 5 plays, 75 yards, 2:09.**
- NE – Chris Hogan 13-yard pass from Tom Brady (Stephen Gostkowski kick), 0:16. Patriots 20–3. **Drive: 9 plays, 67 yards, 3:53.**

**Second quarter**

- NO – Brandon Coleman 5-yard pass from Drew Brees (Wil Lutz kick), 11:52. Patriots 20–10. **Drive: 9 plays, 80 yards, 3:24.**
- NO – Wil Lutz 35-yard field goal, 8:23. Patriots 20–13. **Drive: 7 plays, 45 yards, 2:13.**
- NE – Mike Gillislee 2-yard run (Stephen Gostkowski kick), 4:52. Patriots 27–13. **Drive: 6 plays, 75 yards, 3:31.**
- NE – Stephen Gostkowski 28-yard field goal, 0:02. Patriots 30–13. **Drive: 9 plays, 65 yards, 2:23.**

**Third quarter**

- NE – Stephen Gostkowski 24-yard field goal, 0:44. Patriots 33–13. **Drive: 9 plays, 55 yards, 4:15.**

**Fourth quarter**

- NE – Stephen Gostkowski 27-yard field goal, 8:54. Patriots 36–13. **Drive: 9 plays, 80 yards, 5:30.**
- NO – Coby Fleener 4-yard pass from Drew Brees (Wil Lutz kick), 5:04. Patriots 36–20. **Drive: 10 plays, 75 yards, 3:45.**

**Top passers**

- NE – Tom Brady – 30/39, 447 yards, 3 TD
- NO – Drew Brees – 27/45, 356 yards, 2 TD

**Top rushers**

- NE – Mike Gillislee – 18 rushes, 69 yards, TD
- NO – Mark Ingram II – 8 rushes, 52 yards

**Top receivers**

- NE – Rob Gronkowski – 6 receptions, 116 yards, TD
- NO – Michael Thomas – 5 receptions, 89 yards

**Top tacklers**

- NE – Patrick Chung and Elandon Roberts - 7 tackles, 1 assist
- NO – P. J. Williams – 8 tackles, 2 assists

The Saints lose to the defending Super Bowl champions, New England Patriots, thus dropping their record to 0-2.

==== Week 3: at Carolina Panthers ====
Week Three: New Orleans Saints at Carolina Panthers – Game summary

Quarter	1	2	3	4	Total
**Saints**	7	10	7	10	**34**
Panthers	3	3	7	0	**13**

at Bank of America Stadium, Charlotte, North Carolina

- Date: September 24
- Game time: 1:00 p.m. EDT/12:00 pm. CDT
- Game weather: 82 °F (28 °C), sunny
- Game attendance: 73,775
- Referee: Bill Vinovich
- TV announcers (Fox): Kenny Albert, Ronde Barber and Kristina Pink
- Recap, Gamebook

Game information

**First quarter**

- CAR – Graham Gano 32-yard field goal, 6:23. Panthers 3–0. **Drive: 15 plays, 61 yards, 8:41.**
- NO – Michael Thomas 5-yard pass from Drew Brees (Wil Lutz kick), 0:29. Saints 7–3. **Drive: 13 plays, 75 yards, 5:57.**

**Second quarter**

- CAR – Graham Gano 48-yard field goal, 10:52. Saints 7–6. **Drive: 8 plays, 45 yards, 4:36.**
- NO – Brandon Coleman 11-yard pass from Drew Brees (Wil Lutz kick), 5:48. Saints 14–6. **Drive: 4 plays, 24 yards, 2:08.**
- NO – Wil Lutz 33-yard field goal, 0:05. Saints 17–6. **Drive: 10 plays, 54 yards, 4:43.**

**Third quarter**

- NO – Ted Ginn Jr. 40-yard pass from Drew Brees (Wil Lutz kick), 11:18. Saints 24–6. **Drive: 8 plays, 75 yards, 3:51.**
- CAR – Cam Newton 3-yard run (Graham Gano kick), 1:26. Saints 24–13. **Drive: 7 plays, 83 yards, 4:11.**

**Fourth quarter**

- NO – Wil Lutz 50-yard field goal, 12:03. Saints 27–13. **Drive: 7 plays, 44 yards, 4:21.**
- NO – Alvin Kamara 25-yard run (Wil Lutz kick), 4:50. Saints 34–13. **Drive: 4 plays, 35 yards, 2:16.**

**Top passers**

- NO – Drew Brees – 22/29, 220 yards, 3 TD
- CAR – Cam Newton – 17/26, 167 yards, 3 INT

**Top rushers**

- NO – Mark Ingram II – 14 rushes, 56 yards
- CAR – Jonathan Stewart – 12 rushes, 57 yards

**Top receivers**

- NO – Michael Thomas – 7 receptions, 87 yards, TD
- CAR – Christian McCaffrey – 9 receptions, 101 yards

The Saints gain their first victory of the season against the Carolina Panthers. They improve to 1-2.

==== Week 4: at Miami Dolphins ====
NFL London Games

Week Four: New Orleans Saints at Miami Dolphins – Game summary

Quarter	1	2	3	4	Total
**Saints**	0	3	7	10	**20**
Dolphins	0	0	0	0	**0**

at Wembley Stadium, London, England

- Date: October 1
- Game time: 2:30 p.m. BST/8:30 am. CDT
- Game weather: 63 °F (17 °C), clear
- Game attendance: 84,423
- Referee: Ed Hochuli
- TV announcers (Fox): Kevin Burkhardt, Charles Davis and Pam Oliver
- Recap, Gamebook

Game information

**First quarter**

- No scoring plays

**Second quarter**

- NO – Wil Lutz 43-yard field goal, 0:00. Saints 3–0. **Drive: 8 plays, 25 yards, 1:10.**

**Third quarter**

- NO – Michael Thomas 3-yard pass from Drew Brees (Wil Lutz kick), 9:01. Saints 10–0. **Drive: 11 plays, 77 yards, 5:59.**

**Fourth quarter**

- NO – Wil Lutz 45-yard field goal, 12:32. Saints 13–0. **Drive: 12 plays, 34 yards, 6:37.**
- NO – Alvin Kamara 12-yard pass from Drew Brees (Wil Lutz kick), 3:57. Saints 20–0. **Drive: 11 plays, 87 yards, 5:41.**

**Top passers**

- NO – Drew Brees – 29/41, 268 yards, 2 TD
- MIA – Jay Cutler – 20/28, 164 yards, INT

**Top rushers**

- NO – Mark Ingram II – 14 carries, 45 yards
- MIA – Jay Ajayi – 12 carries, 46 yards

**Top receivers**

- NO – Michael Thomas – 8 receptions, 89 yards, TD
- MIA – DeVante Parker – 6 receptions, 69 yards

Hoping to improve their record to 2-2, the Saints flew to London to take on the Miami Dolphins. With the shutout victory, the Saints improved their season record in the process.

==== Week 6: vs. Detroit Lions ====
Week Six: Detroit Lions at New Orleans Saints – Game summary

Quarter	1	2	3	4	Total
Lions	7	3	14	14	**38**
**Saints**	17	14	14	7	**52**

at Mercedes-Benz Superdome, New Orleans, Louisiana

- Date: October 15
- Game time: 12:00 pm. CDT
- Game weather: Played indoors (dome stadium)
- Game attendance: 73,117
- Referee: Jeff Triplette
- TV announcers (Fox): Dan Hellie, Chris Spielman and Peter Schrager
- Recap, Gamebook

Game information

**First quarter**

- NO – Kenny Vaccaro fumble recovery in end zone (Wil Lutz kick), 11:02. Saints 7–0. **Drive: 3 plays, -2 yards, 0:54.**
- DET – Golden Tate 45-yard pass from Matthew Stafford (Matt Prater kick), 7:02. Tied 7–7. **Drive: 7 plays, 75 yards, 4:00.**
- NO – Ted Ginn Jr. 20-yard pass from Drew Brees (Wil Lutz kick), 4:56. Saints 14–7. **Drive: 4 plays, 75 yards, 2:06.**
- NO – Wil Lutz 41-yard field goal, 0:04. Saints 17–7. **Drive: 9 plays, 69 yards, 3:50.**

**Second quarter**

- NO – Mark Ingram II 1-yard run (Wil Lutz kick), 10:46. Saints 24–7. **Drive: 6 plays, 31 yards, 2:55.**
- DET – Matt Prater 41-yard field goal, 6:38. Saints 24–10. **Drive: 8 plays, 53 yards, 4:08.**
- NO – Mark Ingram II 2-yard run (Wil Lutz kick), 1:48. Saints 31–10. **Drive: 11 plays, 75 yards, 4:50.**

**Third quarter**

- NO – Michael Hoomanawanui 2-yard pass from Drew Brees (Wil Lutz kick), 9:17. Saints 38–10. **Drive: 7 plays, 54 yards, 3:18.**
- NO – Marshon Lattimore 27-yard interception return (Wil Lutz kick), 8:34. Saints 45–10. **Drive: 2 plays, 2 yards, 0:43.**
- DET – Marvin Jones Jr. 22-yard pass from Matthew Stafford (Matt Prater kick), 5:56. Saints 45–17. **Drive: 6 plays, 75 yards, 2:38.**
- DET – Darren Fells 22-yard pass from Matthew Stafford (Matt Prater kick), 1:21. Saints 45–24. **Drive: 11 plays, 61 yards, 3:16.**

**Fourth quarter**

- DET – Jamal Agnew 74-yard punt return (Matt Prater kick), 11:03. Saints 45–31.
- DET – A'Shawn Robinson 2-yard interception return (Matt Prater kick), 6:41. Saints 45–38. **Drive: 2 plays, -4 yards, 0:48.**
- NO – Cameron Jordan interception in end zone (Wil Lutz), 5:04. Saints 52–38. **Drive: 2 plays, 0 yards, 0:07.**

**Top passers**

- DET – Matthew Stafford – 25/52, 312 yards, 3 TD, 3 INT
- NO – Drew Brees – 21/31, 186 yards, 2 TD, 2 INT

**Top rushers**

- DET – Ameer Abdullah – 14 carries, 54 yards
- NO – Mark Ingram II – 25 carries, 114 yards, 2 TD

**Top receivers**

- DET – Golden Tate – 7 receptions, 96 yards, TD
- NO – Ted Ginn Jr. – 4 receptions, 66 yards, TD

Coming off with the perfect win over Miami, the Saints host the Lions at home in the Superdome. Cameron Jordan gained popularity for his "spider" tackle, as well as a pick six in the end zone. The Saints would beat the Lions for the first time since the 2011 season, and then improve their record to 3-2.

==== Week 7: at Green Bay Packers ====
Week Seven: New Orleans Saints at Green Bay Packers – Game summary

Quarter	1	2	3	4	Total
**Saints**	0	7	9	10	**26**
Packers	7	7	0	3	**17**

at Lambeau Field, Green Bay, Wisconsin

- Date: October 22
- Game time: 12:00 pm. CDT
- Game weather: 52 °F (11 °C), rain
- Game attendance: 78,380
- Referee: Jerome Boger
- TV announcers (Fox): Kenny Albert, Charles Davis and Pam Oliver
- Recap, Gamebook

Game information

First quarter

- GB – Aaron Jones 46-yard run (Mason Crosby kick), 13:09. Packers 7–0. **Drive: 5 plays, 75 yards, 2:00.**

Second quarter

- NO – Mark Ingram II 12-yard run (Wil Lutz kick), 12:35. Tied 7–7. **Drive: 7 plays, 53 yards, 3:13.**
- GB – Brett Hundley 14-yard run (Mason Crosby kick), 08:45. Packers 14–7. **Drive: 8 plays, 75 yards, 3:54.**

Third quarter

- NO – Brandon Coleman 22-yard pass from Drew Brees, 11:29. Packers 14–13. **Drive: 7 plays, 59 yards, 3:36.**
- NO – Wil Lutz 28-yard field goal, 4:12. Saints 16–14. **Drive: 10 plays, 74 yards, 4:40.**

Fourth quarter

- GB – Mason Crosby 46-yard field goal, 14:50. Packers 17–16. **Drive: 10 plays, 53 yards, 4:18.**
- NO – Wil Lutz 44-yard field goal, 10:26. Saints 19–17. **Drive: 9 plays, 60 yards, 4:29.**
- NO – Drew Brees 1-yard run (Wil Lutz kick), 4:57. Saints 26–17. **Drive: 8 plays, 55 yards, 3:30.**

Top passers

- NO – Drew Brees – 27/38, 331 yards, TD, 2 INT
- GB – Brett Hundley – 12/25, 87 yards, INT

Top rushers

- NO – Mark Ingram II – 22 rushes, 105 yards, TD
- GB – Aaron Jones – 17 rushes, 131 yards, TD

Top receivers

- NO – Ted Ginn Jr. – 7 receptions, 141 yards
- GB – Martellus Bennett – 2 receptions, 17 yards

==== Week 8: vs. Chicago Bears ====
Week Eight: Chicago Bears at New Orleans Saints – Game summary

Quarter	1	2	3	4	Total
Bears	0	3	3	6	**12**
**Saints**	7	7	0	6	**20**

at Mercedes-Benz Superdome, New Orleans, Louisiana

- Date: October 29
- Game time: 12:00 pm. CDT
- Game weather: Played indoors (dome stadium)
- Game attendance: 73,192
- Referee: Carl Cheffers
- TV announcers (Fox): Justin Kutcher, Chris Spielman and Jennifer Hale
- Recap, Gamebook

Game information

**First quarter**

- NO – Alvin Kamara 8-yard run (Wil Lutz kick), 11:08. Saints 7–0. **Drive: 7 plays, 81 yards, 3:52.**

**Second quarter**

- CHI – Connor Barth 27-yard field goal, 14:52. Saints 7–3. **Drive: 10 plays, 67 yards, 5:25.**
- NO – Mark Ingram II 1-yard run (Wil Lutz kick), 3:41. Saints 14–3. **Drive: 8 plays, 80 yards, 4:30.**

**Third quarter**

- CHI – Connor Barth 44-yard field goal, 5:42. Saints 14–6. **Drive: 8 plays, 72 yards, 3:31.**

**Fourth quarter**-

- NO – Wil Lutz 45-yard field goal, 12:54. Saints 17–6. **Drive: 7 plays, 26 yards, 2:26.**
- CHI – Tarik Cohen 1-yard run (pass failed), 3:58. Saints 17–12. **Drive: 10 plays, 72 yards, 3:34.**
- NO – Wil Lutz 49-yard field goal, 1:35. Saints 20–12. **Drive: 4 plays, 7 yards, 0:16.**

**Top passers**

- CHI – Mitchell Trubisky – 14/32, 164 yards, INT
- NO – Drew Brees – 23/28, 299 yards

**Top rushers**

- CHI – Jordan Howard – 23 rushes, 102 yards
- NO – Mark Ingram II – 18 rushes, 75 yards, TD

**Top receivers**

- CHI – Tre McBride – 3 receptions, 92 yards
- NO – Michael Thomas – 7 receptions, 77 yards

**Top tacklers**

- CHI – Danny Trevathan – 9 tackles, 4 assists
- NO – Kenny Vaccaro – 6 tackles, 3 assists

==== Week 9: vs. Tampa Bay Buccaneers ====
Week Nine: Tampa Bay Buccaneers at New Orleans Saints – Game summary

Quarter	1	2	3	4	Total
Buccaneers	0	3	0	7	**10**
**Saints**	9	7	14	0	**30**

at Mercedes-Benz Superdome, New Orleans, Louisiana

- Date: November 5
- Game time: 12:00 pm. CST
- Game weather: Played indoors (dome stadium)
- Game attendance: 73,121
- Referee: Bill Vinovich
- TV announcers (Fox): Thom Brennaman, Chris Spielman and Peter Schrager
- Recap, Gamebook

Game information

**First quarter**

- NO – Wil Lutz 40-yard field goal, 8:49. Saints 3–0. **Drive: 12 plays, 58 yards, 6:11.**
- NO – Justin Hardee 7-yard return of block punt (kick blocked), 6:31. Saints 9–0.

**Second quarter**

- TB – Patrick Murray 50-yard field goal, 2:57. Saints 9–3. **Drive: 10 plays, 40 yards, 5:44.**
- NO – Alvin Kamara 33-yard pass from Drew Brees (Wil Lutz kick), 0:55. Saints 16–3. **Drive: 7 plays, 93 yards, 2:02.**

**Third quarter**

- NO – Alvin Kamara 6-yard run (Wil Lutz kick), 9:59. Saints 23–3. **Drive: 6 plays, 72 yards, 3:31.**
- NO – Ted Ginn Jr. 36-yard pass from Drew Brees (Wil Lutz kick), 9:39. Saints 30–3. **Drive: 1 plays, 36 yards, 0:07.**

**Fourth quarter**

- TB – Luke Stocker 8-yard pass from Ryan Fitzpatrick (Patrick Murray kick), 6:48. Saints 30–10. **Drive: 3 plays, 19 yards, 1:26.**

**Top passers**

- TB – Ryan Fitzpatrick – 8/15, 68 yards, TD
- NO – Drew Brees – 22/27, 263 yards, 2 TD

**Top rushers**

- TB – Peyton Barber – 11 carries, 34 yards
- NO – Mark Ingram II – 16 carries, 77 yards

**Top receivers**

- TB – DeSean Jackson – 2 receptions, 25 yards
- NO – Michael Thomas – 8 receptions, 65 yards

**Top tacklers**

- TB – Ryan Smith - 4 tackles, 5 assists
- NO – Cameron Jordan - 5 Tackles, 2 assists, 1.5 sacks

==== Week 10: at Buffalo Bills ====
Week Ten: New Orleans Saints at Buffalo Bills – Game summary

Quarter	1	2	3	4	Total
**Saints**	7	10	20	10	**47**
Bills	3	0	0	7	**10**

at New Era Field, Orchard Park, New York

- Date: November 12
- Game time: 1:00 pm. EST/12:00 pm. CST
- Game weather: 42 °F (6 °C), cloudy
- Game attendance: 67,501
- Referee: Terry McAulay
- TV announcers (Fox): Kenny Albert, Ronde Barber and Kristina Pink
- Recap, Gamebook

Game information

**First quarter**

- BUF – Stephen Hauschka 37-yard field goal, 10:58. Bills 3–0. **Drive: 9 plays, 57 yards, 4:02.**
- NO – Mark Ingram II 1-yard run (Wil Lutz kick), 6:18. Saints 7–3. **Drive: 9 plays, 75 yards, 4:40.**

**Second quarter**

- NO – Mark Ingram II 3-yard run (Wil Lutz kick), 9:03. Saints 14–3. **Drive: 8 plays, 48 yards, 4:47.**
- NO – Wil Lutz 23-yard field goal, 1:39. Saints 17–3. **Drive: 10 plays, 75 yards, 4:04.**

**Third quarter**

- NO – Alvin Kamara 5-yard run (Wil Lutz kick), 9:40. Saints 24–3. **Drive: 9 plays, 75 yards, 5:20.**
- NO – Mark Ingram II 3-yard run (Wil Lutz PAT failed), 8:24. Saints 30–3. **Drive: 1 play, 3 yards, 0:05.**
- NO – Drew Brees 7-yard run (Wil Lutz kick), 0:22. Saints 37–3. **Drive: 10 plays, 94 yards, 6:33.**

**Fourth quarter**

- NO – Wil Lutz 53-yard field goal, 4:53. Saints 40–3. **Drive: 14 plays, 38 yards, 9:25.**
- NO – Trey Edmunds 41-yard run (Wil Lutz kick), 3:04. Saints 47–3. **Drive: 2 plays, 44 yards, 0:51.**
- BUF – Nick O'Leary 7-yard pass from Nathan Peterman (Stephen Hauschka kick), 1:54. Saints 47–10. **Drive: 6 plays, 75 yards, 1:10.**

**Top passers**

- NO – Drew Brees – 18/25, 184 yards
- BUF – Nathan Peterman – 7/10, 79 yards, TD

**Top rushers**

- NO – Mark Ingram II – 21 carries, 131 yards, 3 TD
- BUF – LeSean McCoy – 8 carries, 49 yards

**Top receivers**

- NO – Michael Thomas – 9 receptions, 117 yards
- BUF – Kelvin Benjamin – 3 receptions, 42 yards

==== Week 11: vs. Washington Redskins ====
Week Eleven: Washington Redskins at New Orleans Saints – Game summary

Quarter	1	2	3	4	OT	Total
Redskins	10	7	7	7	0	**31**
**Saints**	10	3	0	18	3	**34**

at Mercedes-Benz Superdome, New Orleans, Louisiana

- Date: November 19
- Game time: 12:00 pm. CST
- Game weather: Played indoors (dome stadium)
- Game attendance: 73,138
- Referee: Walt Coleman
- TV announcers (Fox): Joe Buck, Troy Aikman and Erin Andrews
- Recap, Gamebook

Game information

**First quarter**

- WSH – Nick Rose 38-yard field goal, 11:40. Redskins 3–0. **Drive: 6 plays, 27 yards, 2:11.**
- NO – Wil Lutz 52-yard field goal, 5:30. Tied 3–3. **Drive: 11 plays, 48 yards, 6:10.**
- WSH – Chris Thompson 16-yard pass from Kirk Cousins (Nick Rose kick), 2:11. Redskins 10–3. **Drive: 7 plays, 75 yards, 3:19.**
- NO – Mark Ingram II 36-yard run (Wil Lutz kick), 0:35. Tied 10–10. **Drive: 4 plays, 80 yards, 1:36.**

**Second quarter**

- WSH – Samaje Perine 1-yard run (Nick Rose kick), 10:44. Redskins 17–10. **Drive: 9 plays, 75 yards, 4:51.**
- NO – Wil Lutz 29-yard field goal, 0:00. Redskins 17–13. **Drive: 10 plays, 69 yards, 1:39.**

**Third quarter**

- WSH – Ryan Grant 40-yard pass from Kirk Cousins (Nick Rose kick), 1:37. Redskins 24–13. **Drive: 12 plays, 94 yards, 5:44.**

**Fourth quarter**

- NO – Wil Lutz 42-yard field goal, 9:19. Redskins 24–16. **Drive: 5 plays, 27 yards, 2:02.**
- WSH – Jeremy Sprinkle 7-yard pass from Kirk Cousins (Nick Rose kick), 5:58. Redskins 31–16. **Drive: 6 plays, 75 yards, 3:21.**
- NO – Josh Hill 3-yard pass from Drew Brees (Wil Lutz kick), 2:53. Redskins 31–23. **Drive: 8 plays, 75 yards, 3:05.**
- NO – Alvin Kamara 18-yard pass from Drew Brees (Alvin Kamara run for two-point conversion), 1:05. Tied 31–31. **Drive: 5 plays, 19 yards, 1:05.**

Overtime

- NO – Wil Lutz 28-yard field goal, 7:25. Saints 34–31. **Drive: 3 plays, 51 yards, 1:29.**

**Top passers**

- WSH – Kirk Cousins – 22/32, 322 yards, 3 TD
- NO – Drew Brees – 29/41, 385 yards, 2 TD, INT

**Top rushers**

- WSH – Samaje Perine – 23 carries, 117 yards, TD
- NO – Mark Ingram II – 11 carries, 134 yards, TD

**Top receivers**

- WSH – Josh Doctson 4 receptions, 81 yards
- NO – Coby Fleener – 5 receptions, 91 yards

This would be the last time the team allowed a 100-yard rusher until December 13, 2020. This is also the first time since the 2009 season for the Saints to beat the Redskins and the first season to beat Kirk Cousins.

==== Week 12: at Los Angeles Rams ====
Week Twelve: New Orleans Saints at Los Angeles Rams – Game summary

Quarter	1	2	3	4	Total
Saints	7	3	0	10	**20**
**Rams**	10	7	3	6	**26**

at Los Angeles Memorial Coliseum, Los Angeles, California

- Date: November 26
- Game time: 3:25 pm. CST/1:25 p.m. PST
- Game weather: 72 °F (22 °C), sunny
- Game attendance: 62,006
- Referee: John Parry
- TV announcers (CBS): Jim Nantz, Tony Romo and Tracy Wolfson
- Recap, Gamebook

Game information

**First quarter**

- LAR – Sammy Watkins 5-yard pass from Jared Goff (Greg Zuerlein kick), 10:53. Rams 7–0. **Drive: 7 plays, 59 yards, 4:07.**
- LAR – Greg Zuerlein 50-yard field goal, 3:02. Rams 10–0. **Drive: 11 plays, 51 yards, 5:28.**
- NO – Alvin Kamara 74-yard run (Wil Lutz kick), 2:14. Rams 10–7. **Drive: 2 plays, 75 yards, 0:48.**

**Second quarter**

- LAR – Josh Reynolds 7-yard pass from Jared Goff (Greg Zuerlein kick), 4:22. Rams 17–7. **Drive: 8 plays, 86 yards, 4:18.**
- NO – Wil Lutz 50-yard field goal, 0:58. Rams 17–10. **Drive: 8 plays, 44 yards, 3:24.**

**Third quarter**

- LAR – Greg Zuerlein 46-yard field goal, 3:37. Rams 20–10. **Drive: 7 plays, 59 yards, 3:13.**

**Fourth quarter**

- LAR – Greg Zuerlein 49-yard field goal, 14:11. Rams 23–10. **Drive: 6 plays, 50 yards, 3:20.**
- NO – Wil Lutz 21-yard field goal, 10:05. Rams 23–13. **Drive: 10 plays, 72 yards, 4:06.**
- LAR – Greg Zuerlein 26-yard field goal, 2:27. Rams 26–13. **Drive: 13 plays, 67 yards, 5:28.**
- NO – Alvin Kamara 15-yard pass from Drew Brees (Wil Lutz kick), 1:45. Rams 26–20. **Drive: 6 plays, 75 yards, 0:42.**

**Top passers**

- NO – Drew Brees – 22/32, 246 yards, TD
- LAR – Jared Goff – 28/43, 354 yards, 2 TD, INT

**Top rushers**

- NO – Alvin Kamara – 5 carries, 87 yards, TD
- LAR – Todd Gurley – 17 carries, 74 yards

**Top receivers**

- NO – Ted Ginn Jr. – 7 receptions, 71 yards
- LAR – Cooper Kupp – 8 receptions, 116 yards

**Top tacklers**

- NO – Vonn Bell - 8 tackles, 2 assists, 1 sack
- LAR – Alec Ogletree - 5 tackles, 2 assists

The Saints weren't able to beat the Rams, thus dropping to 8-3.

==== Week 13: vs. Carolina Panthers ====
Week Thirteen: Carolina Panthers at New Orleans Saints – Game summary

Quarter	1	2	3	4	Total
Panthers	7	7	0	7	**21**
**Saints**	7	14	7	3	**31**

at Mercedes-Benz Superdome, New Orleans, Louisiana

- Date: December 3
- Game time: 3:25 pm. CST
- Game weather: Played indoors (dome stadium)
- Game attendance: 73,171
- Referee: John Hussey
- TV announcers (Fox): Joe Buck, Troy Aikman and Erin Andrews
- Recap, Gamebook

Game information

**First quarter**

- NO – Alvin Kamara 2-yard run (Wil Lutz kick), 10:15. Saints 7–0. **Drive: 11 plays, 70 yards, 4:45.**
- CAR – Jonathan Stewart 2-yard run (Graham Gano kick), 5:09. Tied 7–7. **Drive: 10 plays, 75 yards, 5:06.**

**Second quarter**

- NO – Mark Ingram II 3-yard run (Wil Lutz kick), 11:32. Saints 14–7. **Drive: 3 plays, 84 yards, 1:36.**
- NO – Michael Thomas 10-yard pass from Drew Brees (Wil Lutz kick), 7:21. Saints 21–7. **Drive: 6 plays, 31 yards, 3:18.**
- CAR – Christian McCaffrey 21-yard pass from Cam Newton (Graham Gano kick), 1:56. Saints 21–14. **Drive: 4 plays, 45 yards, 1:54.**

**Third quarter**

- NO – Alvin Kamara 20-yard run (Wil Lutz kick), 8:10. Saints 28–14. **Drive: 8 plays, 67 yards, 5:04.**

**Fourth quarter**

- NO – Wil Lutz 31-yard field goal, 6:08. Saints 31–14. **Drive: 6 plays, 34 yards, 2:47.**
- CAR – Devin Funchess 24-yard pass from Cam Newton (Graham Gano kick), 3:57. Saints 31–21. **Drive: 5 plays, 75 yards, 2:11.**

**Top passers**

- CAR – Cam Newton – 17/27, 183 yards, 2 TD
- NO – Drew Brees – 25/34, 269 yards, TD

**Top rushers**

- CAR – Cam Newton – 6 carries, 51 yards
- NO – Mark Ingram II – 14 carries, 85 yards, TD

**Top receivers**

- CAR – Christian McCaffrey – 5 receptions, 33 yards, TD
- NO – Mark Ingram II - 6 receptions, 37 yards

**Top tacklers**

- CAR – Luke Kuechly - 8 tackles, 1 assist
- NO – Cameron Jordan - 5 tackles, 1 assist and A. J. Klein - 3 tackles, 2 assists, 1 sack

The Saints clinched a winning record for the first time since 2013 and swept the Carolina Panthers for the first time since the Saints' 2011 Season. This improved their record to 9-3.

==== Week 14: at Atlanta Falcons ====
Week Fourteen: New Orleans Saints at Atlanta Falcons – Game summary

Quarter	1	2	3	4	Total
Saints	3	7	7	0	**17**
**Falcons**	3	7	0	10	**20**

at Mercedes-Benz Stadium, Atlanta, Georgia

- Date: December 7
- Game time: 8:25 pm. EST/7:25 pm. CST
- Game weather: Played indoor (retractable roof closed)
- Game attendance: 72,866
- Referee: Clete Blakeman
- TV announcers (NBC/NFLN/Amazon Video): Mike Tirico, Cris Collinsworth and Heather Cox
- Recap, Gamebook

Game information

**First quarter**

- NO – Wil Lutz 34-yard field goal, 9:50. Saints 3–0. **Drive: 10 plays, 54 yards, 5:10.**
- ATL – Matt Bryant 28-yard field goal, 5:33. Tied 3–3. **Drive: 8 plays, 65 yards, 4:17.**

**Second quarter**

- ATL – Devonta Freeman 1-yard run (Matt Bryant kick), 4:29. Falcons 10–3. **Drive: 15 plays, 90 yards, 8:27.**
- NO – Tommylee Lewis 26-yard pass from Drew Brees (Wil Lutz kick), 1:53. Tied 10–10. **Drive: 5 plays, 66 yards, 2:36.**

**Third quarter**

- NO – Michael Thomas 1-yard pass from Drew Brees (Wil Lutz kick), 13:10. Saints 17–10. **Drive: 4 plays, 29 yards, 1:36.**

**Fourth quarter**

- ATL – Mohamed Sanu 8-yard pass from Matt Ryan (Matt Bryant kick), 9:55. Tied 17–17. **Drive: 11 plays, 69 yards, 7:06.**
- ATL – Matt Bryant 52-yard field goal, 3:49. Falcons 20–17. **Drive: 8 plays, 38 yards, 3:57.**

**Top passers**

- NO – Drew Brees – 26/35, 271 yards, 2 TD, INT
- ATL – Matt Ryan – 15/27, 221 yards, TD, 3 INT

**Top rushers**

- NO – Mark Ingram II – 12 carries, 49 yards
- ATL – Devonta Freeman – 24 carries, 91 yards, TD

**Top receivers**

- NO – Michael Thomas – 10 receptions, 117 yards, TD
- ATL – Mohamed Sanu – 6 receptions, 83 yards, TD

**Top tacklers**

- NO – Manti Te’o - 8 tackles, 2 assists
- ATL – Deion Jones - 7 tackles, 6 assists, 1 INT

After a costly Unsportsmanlike Conduct penalty committed by Sean Payton, the Saints were defeated by the Falcons. They fell to 9-4.

==== Week 15: vs. New York Jets ====
Week Fifteen: New York Jets at New Orleans Saints – Game summary

Quarter	1	2	3	4	Total
Jets	0	10	3	6	**19**
**Saints**	10	7	0	14	**31**

at Mercedes-Benz Superdome, New Orleans, Louisiana

- Date: December 17
- Game time: 12:00 pm. CST
- Game weather: Played indoors (dome stadium)
- Game attendance: 73,018
- Referee: Ronald Torbert
- TV announcers (CBS): Kevin Harlan, Rich Gannon and Otis Livingston
- Recap, Gamebook

Game information

**First quarter**

- NO – Wil Lutz 23-yard field goal, 11:36. Saints 3–0. **Drive: 7 plays, 71 yards, 3:24.**
- NO – Mark Ingram II 1-yard run (Wil Lutz kick), 3:07. Saints 10–0. **Drive: 13 plays, 82 yards, 5:25.**

**Second quarter**

- NYJ – Bilal Powell 2-yard run (Chandler Catanzaro kick), 10:58. Saints 10–7. **Drive: 12 plays, 75 yards, 7:09.**
- NO – Alvin Kamara 10-yard pass from Drew Brees (Wil Lutz kick), 6:12. Saints 17–7. **Drive: 8 plays, 75 yards, 4:46.**
- NYJ – Chandler Catanzaro 29-yard field goal, 0:09. Saints 17–10. **Drive: 4 plays, 0 yards, 1:05.**

**Third quarter**

- NYJ – Chandler Catanzaro 26-yard field goal, 8:07. Saints 17–13. **Drive: 9 plays, 58 yards, 3:49.**

**Fourth quarter**

- NO – Michael Thomas 4-yard pass from Drew Brees (Wil Lutz kick), 7:39. Saints 24–13. **Drive: 9 plays, 64 yards, 4:43.**
- NYJ – Elijah McGuire 2-yard pass from Bryce Petty (pass failed), 1:51. Saints 24–19. **Drive: 6 plays, 70 yards, 1:32.**
- NO – Mark Ingram II 50-yard run (Wil Lutz kick), 1:33. Saints 31–19. **Drive: 2 plays, 55 yards, 0:18.**

**Top passers**

- NYJ – Bryce Petty – 19/39, 179 yards, TD, 2 INT
- NO – Drew Brees – 26/36, 281 yards, 2 TD, INT

**Top rushers**

- NYJ – Bilal Powell – 13 carries, 44 yards, TD
- NO – Mark Ingram II – 12 carries, 74 yards, 2 TD

**Top receivers**

- NYJ – Elijah McGuire – 3 receptions, 48 yards, TD
- NO – Michael Thomas – 9 receptions, 93 yards, TD

**Top tacklers**

- NYJ – Jamal Adams - 6 tackles, 2 assists and Demario Davis - 3 tackles, 5 assists
- NO – Kenny Vaccaro - 8 tackles, 2 assists

The Saints beat the Jets for the first time since the 2009 Season, improving their record to 10-4.

==== Week 16: vs. Atlanta Falcons ====
Week Sixteen: Atlanta Falcons at New Orleans Saints – Game summary

Quarter	1	2	3	4	Total
Falcons	0	0	3	10	**13**
**Saints**	3	10	7	3	**23**

at Mercedes-Benz Superdome, New Orleans, Louisiana

- Date: December 24
- Game time: 12:00 pm. CST
- Game weather: Played indoors (dome stadium)
- Game attendance: 73,188
- Referee: Pete Morelli
- TV announcers (Fox): Kevin Burkhardt, Charles Davis and Pam Oliver
- Recap, Gamebook

Game information

**First quarter**

- NO – Wil Lutz 40-yard field goal, 7:31. Saints 3–0. **Drive: 8 plays, 40 yards, 4:04.**

**Second quarter**

- NO – Wil Lutz 29-yard field goal, 1:19. Saints 6–0. **Drive: 16 plays, 68 yards, 8:21.**
- NO – Ted Ginn Jr. 54-yard pass from Drew Brees (Wil Lutz kick), 0:14. Saints 13–0. **Drive: 3 plays, 64 yards, 0:36.**

**Third quarter**

- ATL – Matt Bryant 37-yard field goal, 9:34. Saints 13–3. **Drive: 7 plays, 29 yards, 2:23.**
- NO – Mark Ingram II 26-yard run (Wil Lutz kick), 2:52. Saints 20–3. **Drive: 4 plays, 54 yards, 2:01.**

**Fourth quarter**

- ATL – Matt Bryant 48-yard field goal, 10:18. Saints 20–6. **Drive: 5 plays, 18 yards, 1:06.**
- NO – Wil Lutz 45-yard field goal, 3:38. Saints 23–6. **Drive: 4 plays, 6 yards, 0:22.**
- ATL – Tevin Coleman 14-yard pass from Matt Ryan (Matt Bryant kick), 2:40. Saints 23–13. **Drive: 8 plays, 75 yards, 0:58.**

**Top passers**

- ATL – Matt Ryan – 22/36, 288 yards, TD, INT
- NO – Drew Brees – 21/28, 239 yards, TD, INT

**Top rushers**

- ATL – Devonta Freeman – 11 carries, 36 yards
- NO – Mark Ingram II – 13 carries, 44 yards, TD

**Top receivers**

- ATL – Julio Jones – 7 receptions, 149 yards
- NO – Ted Ginn Jr. – 4 receptions, 76 yards, TD

**Top tacklers**

- ATL – Keanu Neal and Deion Jones - 8 tackles, 2 assists (Jones also has a INT)
- NO – Craig Robertson - 7 tackles, 3 assists

The Saints meet the Falcons again, but this time, they beat them by 10 points. This also brought their record up to 11-4.

==== Week 17: at Tampa Bay Buccaneers ====
Week Seventeen: New Orleans Saints at Tampa Bay Buccaneers – Game summary

Quarter	1	2	3	4	Total
Saints	14	0	3	7	**24**
**Buccaneers**	7	6	0	18	**31**

at Raymond James Stadium, Tampa, Florida

- Date: December 31
- Game time: 4:25 pm. EST/3:25 pm. CST
- Game weather: 71 °F (22 °C), clear
- Game attendance: 55,376
- Referee: Walt Anderson
- TV announcers (Fox): Thom Brennaman, Chris Spielman and Peter Schrager
- Recap, Gamebook

Game information

**First quarter**

- TB – Peyton Barber 1-yard run (Patrick Murray kick), 9:42. Buccaneers 7–0. **Drive: 14 plays, 75 yards, 5:18.**
- NO – Alvin Kamara 106-yard kickoff return (Wil Lutz kick), 9:29. Tied 7–7.
- NO – Alvin Kamara 7-yard run (Wil Lutz kick), 2:36. Saints 14–7. **Drive: 6 plays, 65 yards, 3:24.**

**Second quarter**

- TB – Jameis Winston 1-yard run (kick failed), 5:50. Saints 14–13. **Drive: 12 plays, 75 yards, 6:15.**

**Third quarter**

- NO – Wil Lutz 48-yard field goal, 2:44. Saints 17–13. **Drive: 9 plays, 50 yards, 5:18.**

**Fourth quarter**

- TB – Isaiah Johnson 7-yard fumble return (Patrick Murray kick), 14:04. Buccaneers 20–17.
- NO – Zach Line 3-yard pass from Drew Brees (Wil Lutz kick), 7:07. Saints 24–20. **Drive: 13 plays, 92 yards, 6:57.**
- TB – Patrick Murray 42-yard field goal, 4:31. Saints 24–23. **Drive: 10 plays, 51 yards, 2:36.**
- TB – Chris Godwin 39-yard pass from Jameis Winston (Jameis Winston-Mike Evans pass), 0:09. Buccaneers 31–24. **Drive: 11 plays, 95 yards, 1:49.**

**Top passers**

- NO – Drew Brees – 22/30, 245 yards, TD
- TB – Jameis Winston – 28/51, 363 yards, TD, 3 INT

**Top rushers**

- NO – Alvin Kamara – 9 carries, 44 yards, TD
- TB – Peyton Barber – 17 carries, 71 yards, TD

**Top receivers**

- NO – Michael Thomas – 6 receptions, 94 yards
- TB – Chris Godwin – 7 receptions, 111 yards, TD

**Top tacklers**

- NO –
- TB –

The Saints meet the Buccaneers on the road. However, Jameis Winston would win this game. The Saints finish their regular season 11-5 and advance to the Wild Card playoff game.

=== Standings ===
==== Division ====
NFC South
	W	L	T	PCT	DIV	CONF	PF	PA	STK
^{(4)} New Orleans Saints	11	5	0	.688	4–2	8–4	448	326	L1
^{(5)} Carolina Panthers	11	5	0	.688	3–3	7–5	363	327	L1
^{(6)} Atlanta Falcons	10	6	0	.625	4–2	9–3	353	315	W1
Tampa Bay Buccaneers	5	11	0	.313	1–5	3–9	335	382	W1

==== Conference ====
NFC
#	Team	Division	W	L	T	PCT	DIV	CONF	SOS	SOV	STK
**Division leaders**
1 (Note: Philadelphia claimed the No. 1 seed over Minnesota based on winning percentage vs. common opponents. Philadelphia's cumulative record against Carolina, Chicago, the Los Angeles Rams and Washington was 5–0, compared to Minnesota's 4–1 cumulative record against the same four teams.)	Philadelphia Eagles	East	13	3	0	.813	5–1	10–2	.461	.433	L1
2	Minnesota Vikings	North	13	3	0	.813	5–1	10–2	.492	.447	W3
3 (Note: LA Rams claimed the No. 3 seed over New Orleans based on head-to-head victory.)	Los Angeles Rams	West	11	5	0	.688	4–2	7–5	.504	.460	L1
4 (Note: New Orleans clinched the NFC South division over Carolina based on head-to-head sweep.)	New Orleans Saints	South	11	5	0	.688	4–2	8–4	.535	.483	L1
**Wild Cards**
5	Carolina Panthers	South	11	5	0	.688	3–3	7–5	.539	.500	L1
6	Atlanta Falcons	South	10	6	0	.625	4–2	9–3	.543	.475	W1
**Did not qualify for the postseason**
7 (Note: Detroit finished ahead of Dallas and Seattle based on conference record, while Seattle finished ahead of Dallas based on head-to-head victory.)	Detroit Lions	North	9	7	0	.563	5–1	8–4	.496	.368	W1
8	Seattle Seahawks	West	9	7	0	.563	4–2	7–5	.492	.444	L1
9	Dallas Cowboys	East	9	7	0	.563	5–1	7–5	.496	.438	W1
10	Arizona Cardinals	West	8	8	0	.500	3–3	5–7	.488	.406	W2
11 (Note: Green Bay finished ahead of Washington based on record vs. common opponents. Green Bay's cumulative record against Dallas, Minnesota, New Orleans and Seattle was 2–3, compared to Washington's 1–4 cumulative record against the same four teams.)	Green Bay Packers	North	7	9	0	.438	2–4	5–7	.539	.357	L3
12	Washington Redskins	East	7	9	0	.438	1–5	5–7	.539	.429	L1
13	San Francisco 49ers	West	6	10	0	.375	1–5	3–9	.512	.438	W5
14 (Note: Tampa Bay finished ahead of Chicago based on head-to-head victory.)	Tampa Bay Buccaneers	South	5	11	0	.313	1–5	3–9	.555	.375	W1
15	Chicago Bears	North	5	11	0	.313	0–6	1–11	.559	.500	L1
16	New York Giants	East	3	13	0	.188	1–5	1–11	.531	.458	W1
**Tiebreakers** (Note: When breaking ties for three or more teams under the NFL's rules, they are first broken within divisions, then comparing only the highest-ranked remaining team from each division.)

== Postseason ==
Playoff round	Date	Opponent (seed)	Result	Record	Game site	NFL.com recap
Wild Card	January 7, 2018	Carolina Panthers (5)	W 31–26	1–0	Mercedes-Benz Superdome	Recap
Divisional	January 14, 2018	at Minnesota Vikings (2)	L 24–29	1–1	U.S. Bank Stadium	Recap

=== NFC Wild Card Playoffs: vs. (5) Carolina Panthers ===
NFC Wild Card Playoffs: (5) Carolina Panthers at (4) New Orleans Saints – Game summary

Quarter	1	2	3	4	Total
Panthers	0	9	3	14	26
Saints	7	14	3	7	31

at Mercedes-Benz Superdome, New Orleans, Louisiana

- Date: January 7, 2018
- Game time: 3:40 p.m. CST
- Game weather: Played indoors (dome stadium)
- Game attendance: 73,186
- Referee: Tony Corrente
- TV announcers (Fox): Joe Buck, Troy Aikman, Erin Andrews and Chris Myers
- Recap, Gamebook

Game information

1st quarter

- NO – Ted Ginn Jr. 80-yard pass from Drew Brees (Wil Lutz kick), 1:46. Saints 7–0. Drive: 2 plays, 80 yards, 0:18.

2nd quarter

- CAR – Graham Gano 27-yard field goal, 14:12. Saints 7–3. Drive: 6 plays, 66 yards, 2:34.
- NO – Josh Hill 9-yard pass from Drew Brees (Wil Lutz kick), 9:04. Saints 14–3. Drive: 9 plays, 75 yards, 5:08.
- CAR – Graham Gano 39-yard field goal, 2:47. Saints 14–6. Drive: 12 plays, 54 yards, 6:17.
- NO – Zach Line 1-yard run (Wil Lutz kick), 0:43. Saints 21–6. Drive: 8 plays, 75 yards, 2:04.
- CAR – Graham Gano 58-yard field goal, 0:00. Saints 21–9. Drive: 5 plays, 35 yards, 0:43.

3rd quarter

- CAR – Graham Gano 29-yard field goal, 10:58. Saints 21–12. Drive: 9 plays, 64 yards, 4:02.
- NO – Wil Lutz 57-yard field goal, 6:05. Saints 24–12. Drive: 10 plays, 36 yards, 4:53.

4th quarter

- CAR – Greg Olsen 14-yard pass from Cam Newton (Graham Gano kick), 12:47. Saints 24–19. Drive: 8 plays, 68 yards, 3:45.
- NO – Alvin Kamara 2-yard run (Wil Lutz kick), 5:08. Saints 31–19. Drive: 5 plays, 62 yards, 3:02.
- CAR – Christian McCaffrey 56-yard pass from Cam Newton (Graham Gano kick), 4:09. Saints 31–26. Drive: 3 plays, 75 yards, 0:59.

Top passers

- CAR – Cam Newton – 24/40, 349 yards, 2 TD
- NO – Drew Brees – 23/33, 376 yards, 2 TD, INT

Top rushers

- CAR – Jonathan Stewart – 11 rushes, 51 yards
- NO – Alvin Kamara – 10 rushes, 23 yards, TD

Top receivers

- CAR – Greg Olsen – 8 receptions, 107 yards, TD
- NO – Michael Thomas – 8 receptions, 131 yards

The Saints meet the Panthers in the Playoffs for the first time. It also marked their first Wild Card victory against their division rival by five points. With their victory over the Panthers, the Saints extend their season by improving to 12-5 and advancing to the Divisional Playoff game.

=== NFC Divisional Playoffs: at (2) Minnesota Vikings ===
NFC Divisional Playoffs: (4) New Orleans Saints at (2) Minnesota Vikings – Game summary

Quarter	1	2	3	4	Total
Saints	0	0	7	17	24
Vikings	10	7	0	12	29

at U.S. Bank Stadium, Minneapolis, Minnesota

- Date: January 14, 2018
- Game time: 3:40 pm. CST
- Game weather: Played indoors (dome stadium)
- Game attendance: 66,612
- Referee: Gene Steratore
- TV announcers (Fox): Joe Buck, Troy Aikman, Erin Andrews and Chris Myers
- Recap, Gamebook

Game information

First quarter

- MIN – Jerick McKinnon 14-yard run (Kai Forbath kick), 9:45. Vikings 7–0. Drive: 8 plays, 55 yards, 4:15.
- MIN – Kai Forbath 20-yard field goal, 4:42. Vikings 10–0. Drive: 7 plays, 79 yards, 2:27.

Second quarter

- MIN – Latavius Murray 1-yard run (Kai Forbath kick), 9:58. Vikings 17–0. Drive: 12 plays, 58 yards, 6:08.

Third quarter

- NO – Michael Thomas 14-yard pass from Drew Brees (Wil Lutz kick), 1:18. Vikings 17–7. Drive: 12 plays, 80 yards, 6:40.

Fourth quarter

- NO – Michael Thomas 3-yard pass from Drew Brees (Wil Lutz kick), 13:19. Vikings 17–14. Drive: 6 plays, 30 yards, 3:00.
- MIN – Kai Forbath 49-yard field goal, 10:12. Vikings 20–14. Drive: 7 plays, 44 yards, 2:57.
- NO – Alvin Kamara 14-yard pass from Drew Brees (Wil Lutz kick), 3:01. Saints 21–20. Drive: 4 plays, 40 yards, 2:20.
- MIN – Kai Forbath 53-yard field goal, 1:29. Vikings 23–21. Drive: 9 plays, 40 yards, 1:32.
- NO – Wil Lutz 43-yard field goal, 0:25. Saints 24–23. Drive: 11 plays, 50 yards, 1:04.
- MIN – Stefon Diggs 61-yard pass from Case Keenum (run failed), 0:00. Vikings 29–24. Drive: 4 plays, 75 yards, 0:25.

Top passers

- NO – Drew Brees – 25/40, 294 yards, 3 TD, 2 INT
- MIN – Case Keenum – 25/40, 318 yards, TD, INT

Top rushers

- NO – Alvin Kamara – 11 rushes, 43 yards
- MIN – Latavius Murray – 19 rushes, 50 yards, TD

Top receivers

- NO – Michael Thomas – 7 receptions, 85 yards, 2 TD
- MIN – Stefon Diggs – 6 receptions, 137 yards, TD
