= Marshon Lattimore =

American football player (born 1996)

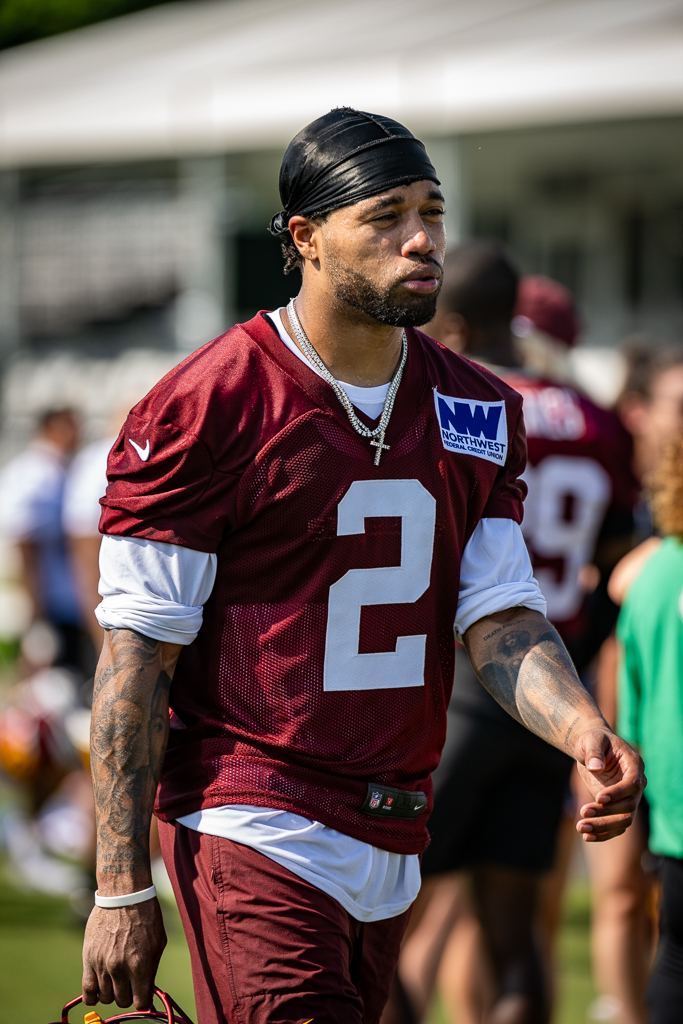
- Lattimore with the Washington Commanders in 2025

Profile
- Position: Cornerback

Personal information
- Born: May 20, 1996 (age 30); Cleveland, Ohio, U.S.
- Listed height: 6 ft 0 in (1.83 m)
- Listed weight: 192 lb (87 kg)

Career information
- High school: Glenville (Cleveland)
- College: Ohio State (2014–2016)
- NFL draft: 2017: 1st round, 11th overall pick

Career history
- New Orleans Saints (2017–2024); Washington Commanders (2024–2025)

Awards and highlights
- NFL Defensive Rookie of the Year (2017); 4× Pro Bowl (2017, 2019–2021); PFWA All-Rookie Team (2017); CFP national champion (2014); First-team All-Big Ten (2016)

Career NFL statistics as of 2025
- Tackles: 436
- Forced fumbles: 5
- Fumble recoveries: 6
- Pass deflections: 98
- Interceptions: 16
- Touchdowns: 2
- Stats at Pro Football Reference

Marshon Lattimore (born May 20, 1996) is an American professional football cornerback. He played college football for the Ohio State Buckeyes and was selected by the New Orleans Saints in the first round of the 2017 NFL draft. Lattimore was named the 2017 Defensive Rookie of the Year and made four Pro Bowls with the Saints before being traded to the Washington Commanders midway through the 2024 season.

== Early life ==
Lattimore was born on May 20, 1996, in Cleveland, Ohio. He attended Glenville High School, where he played cornerback and wide receiver for their football team. As a senior, he was one of six finalists for the U.S. Army Player of the Year Award. Lattimore was rated as a four-star recruit and committed to Ohio State University to play college football.

== College career ==
Lattimore redshirted his first year at Ohio State in 2014 and played in only seven games his redshirt freshman year in 2015, due to hamstring injuries. He fully recovered from the injuries to become a starter in 2016. On November 29, 2016, Lattimore was named First-team All-Big Ten Conference by the coaches.

== Professional career ==
Coming out of Ohio State, Lattimore was projected to be a first round pick by the majority of National Football League (NFL) experts and analysts. He was invited to the NFL Combine, but chose not to perform the bench press, shuttle, and three-cone drill. He attended Ohio State's Pro Day and decided to only run positional drills for scouts and representatives. Although he had a history of hamstring injuries and was limited to a single year of starting experience in college, he was ranked the top cornerback prospect in the draft by NFLDraftScout.com, Sports Illustrated, ESPN, NFL analyst Bucky Brooks, and NFL analyst Mike Mayock.

External videos
- NFL Combine Profile: Marshon Lattimore
- Marshon Lattimore 2017 Combine workout

Pre-draft measurables
Height	Weight	Arm length	Hand span	Wingspan	40-yard dash	10-yard split	20-yard split	Vertical jump	Broad jump	Wonderlic
6 ft 0 in (1.83 m)	193 lb (88 kg)	31 1/4 in (0.79 m)	8 7/8 in (0.23 m)	6 ft 2 7/8 in (1.90 m)	4.36 s	1.49 s	2.53 s	38.5 in (0.98 m)	11 ft 0 in (3.35 m)	23
All values from NFL Combine

=== New Orleans Saints ===
External videos
- Saints select Marshon Lattimore No. 11

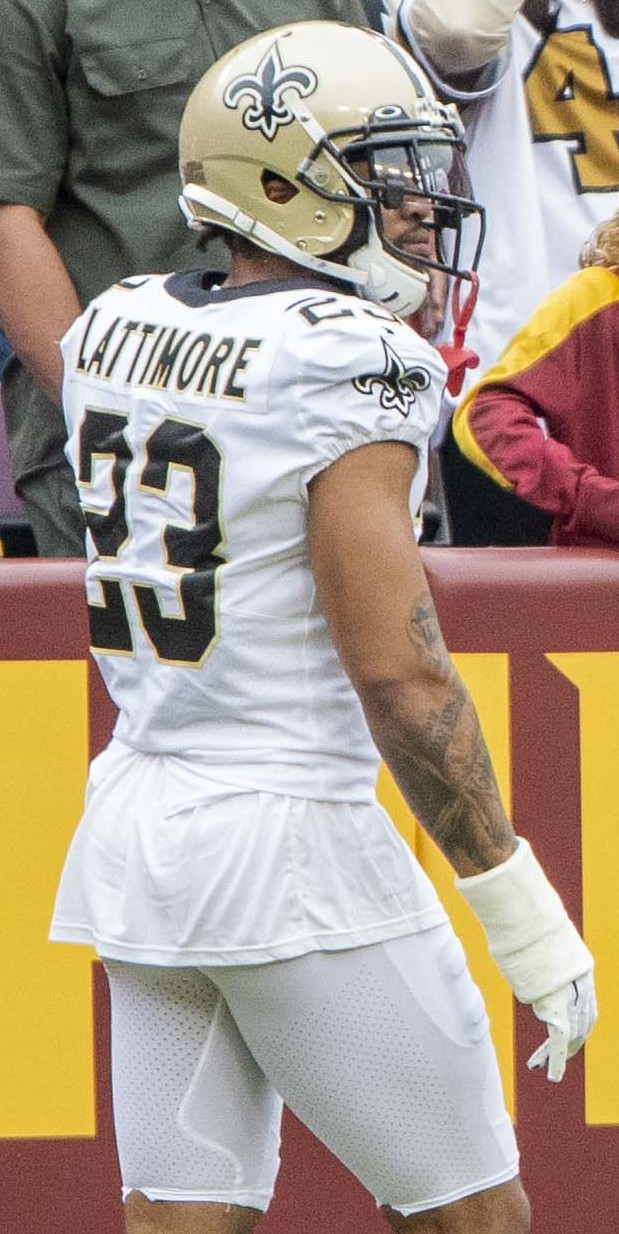
Lattimore with the New Orleans Saints in 2021

The New Orleans Saints selected Lattimore in the first round (11th overall) of the 2017 NFL draft. He was the first of five cornerbacks selected in the first round of the draft.

==== 2017 ====
On June 3, 2017, the New Orleans Saints signed Lattimore to a fully guaranteed four–year, $15.35 million contract with an initial signing bonus of $9.31 million.

During training camp, he competed against Ken Crawley and De'Vante Harris to be the third cornerback on the depth chart as the Saints planned to slowly develop him and had him compete against behind starters Delvin Breaux and P. J. Williams. On August 16, 2017, starter Delvin Breaux fractured his fibula, leading to Lattimore competing against Ken Crawley for to replace him as a starting cornerback. Head coach Sean Payton named him a backup cornerback to begin the season, behind starting cornerback tandem P. J. Williams and Ken Crawley.

On September 11, 2017, Lattimore made his professional regular season debut and earned his first career start in the New Orleans Saints' season-opener at the Minnesota Vikings on Monday Night Football and recorded four solo tackles during a 29–19 loss. He started the first two games of the season in place of Ken Crawley, who was inactive as a healthy scratch. The following week, he had a season-high seven combined tackles (five solo), two pass deflections, and a forced fumble during a 36–20 loss against the New England Patriots. He exited during the fourth quarter after sustaining a concussion in a collision with teammate Vonn Bell as they both tackled receiver Brandin Cooks. He remained in concussion protocol for Week 3 during the Saints' 34–13 victory at the Carolina Panthers. Lattimore was promoted to starting cornerback prior to Week 4 after P. J. Williams was demoted in relation with a disciplinary issue. On October 15, 2017, Lattimore recorded five combined tackles (one solo), made two pass deflections, and returned his first career interception on a pass by Matthew Stafford for 27–yards, scoring his first career touchdown during a 52–38 victory at the Detroit Lions. He earned the National Football Conference (NFC) Defensive Rookie of the Month for the month of October. He sprained his ankle during a 34–31 overtime victory against the Washington Redskins in Week 11 and was inactive for two games (Weeks 12–13). In Week 14, he made three combined tackles (two solo), a pass deflection, and intercepted a pass by Matt Ryan to wide receiver Julio Jones during a 17–20 loss at the Atlanta Falcons. The following week, he recorded five combined tackles (three solo), three pass deflections, and intercepted a pass by Bryce Petty to wide receiver Jojo Natson at the end of the fourth quarter of a 31–19 win against the New York Jets in Week 15. On December 21, 2017, it was announced that Lattimore was named to the 2018 Pro Bowl. On December 24, 2017, Lattimore produced five combined tackles (three solo), a season-high four pass deflections, and had his third consecutive game with an interception during a 23–13 victory against the Atlanta Falcons. He was named the NFL Defensive Rookie of the Year after recording 52 combined tackles (43 solo), 18 pass deflections, five interceptions, and a touchdown in 13 games. He received an overall grade of 86.1 from Pro Football Focus in 2017.

The New Orleans Saints finished the 2017 NFL season first in the NFC South and clinched a playoff berth with an 11–5 record. On January 7, 2018, Lattimore started in his first career playoff game and recorded two solo tackles and two pass deflections during a 31–26 NFC Wild Card round victory over the Carolina Panthers. The following week, he made four solo tackles and two pass deflections during a 29–24 loss at the Minnesota Vikings in the Divisional round, which became known as the Minneapolis Miracle. He was ranked 82nd by his peers on the NFL Top 100 Players of 2018, one of three rookies to make the list.

==== 2018 ====
He entered training camp slated as the de facto No. 1 starting cornerback. Head coach Sean Payton named him the starting cornerback to begin the season and paired him with Ken Crawley and Patrick Robinson.

In Week 11, he made four solo tackles, tied his season-high with two pass deflections, and intercepted a pass by Carson Wentz as the Saints routed the Philadelphia Eagles 48–7. On November 29, 2018, Lattimore collected a season-high ten combined tackles (nine solo) and forced a fumble by Amari Cooper that he recovered and celebrated by putting $23 into the Salvation Army's Red Kettle during a 13–10 loss at the Dallas Cowboys. In Week 14, Lattimore made five solo tackles, tied his season-high of two pass deflections, forced a fumble, and also intercepted a pass by Jameis Winston in the endzone during a 28–14 victory at the Tampa Bay Buccaneers. He started in all 16 games in 2018 and had 59 combined tackles (49 solo), 12 pass deflections, two interceptions, four forced fumbles, and three fumble recoveries. He earned an overall grade of 73.3 from Pro Football Focus in 2018.

The New Orleans Saints finished the 2018 NFL season first in the NFC South with a 13–3 record, clinching a first-round bye. On January 13, 2019, Lattimore had four solo tackles, two pass deflections, and had two interceptions off passes thrown by Nick Foles during a 20–14 win against the Philadelphia Eagles in the Divisional Round. His second interception occurred in the fourth quarter after wide receiver Alshon Jeffery dropped a pass which was caught by Lattimore to seal their victory. On January 20, 2019, he made six combined tackles (five solo) during a 26–23 overtime loss in the NFC Championship Game against the Los Angeles Rams.

==== 2019 ====
He returned as the No. 1 starting cornerback under defensive coordinator Dennis Allen and led a group of cornerbacks that included Patrick Robinson, Ken Crawley, Eli Apple, Kayvon Webster, and Justin Hardee. Head coach Sean Payton named him the starting cornerback to begin the season and paired him with Eli Apple.

In Week 3, Lattimore collected a season-high 12 combined tackles (ten solo) and made one pass deflection during a 33–27 victory at the Seattle Seahawks On October 13, 2019, he recorded three solo tackles, a season-high three pass deflections, and had his lone interception of the season off of a pass by Gardner Minshew to wide receiver D. J. Chark during a 13–6 victory at the Jacksonville Jaguars. He was inactive for two games (Weeks 11–12) after injuring his hamstring. He finished the season with 57 combined tackles (46 solo), 14 passes defended, and an interception in 14 games and 14 starts. He was named to his second Pro Bowl, but chose not to play in the 2020 Pro Bowl due to an injury. He was ranked 76th by his fellow players on the NFL Top 100 Players of 2020. Pro Football Focus had Lattimore finish the 2019 NFL season with an overall grade of 68.1.

==== 2020 ====
He returned as the No. 1 starting cornerback in 2020 and was paired with Janoris Jenkins. He was inactive during a 35–29 win at the Detroit Lions in Week 4 due to a hamstring injury.BIn Week 5 against the Los Angeles Chargers on Monday Night Football, Lattimore recorded the game winning tackle on wide receiver Mike Williams short of the first down marker on fourth down during the 30–27 overtime win. On November 1, 2020, Lattimore recorded a season-high eight combined tackles (seven solo), made a pass deflection, and had his first interception of the season off a pass thrown by Nick Foles to tight end Jimmy Graham during a 26–23 overtime win at the Chicago Bears. He was inactive for a 24–9 win against the Atlanta Falcons in Week 11 after injuring his abdomen. He finished the 2020 NFL season with 62 combined tackles (52 solo), two interceptions, and 11 passes defended in 14 games and 14 starts. He was ranked 86th by his fellow players on the NFL Top 100 Players of 2021. He received an overall grade of 76.1 from Pro Football Focus in 2020.

==== 2021 ====
He entered training camp slated as the de facto No. 1 starting cornerback. Head coach Sean Payton named him the starter for the season-opener and paired him with third-round rookie Paulson Adebo. On September 12, 2021, the New Orleans Saints signed Lattimore to a five–year, $97.60 million contract extension that includes $58.10 million guaranteed, $34.10 million guaranteed upon signing, and an initial signing bonus of $7.50 million.

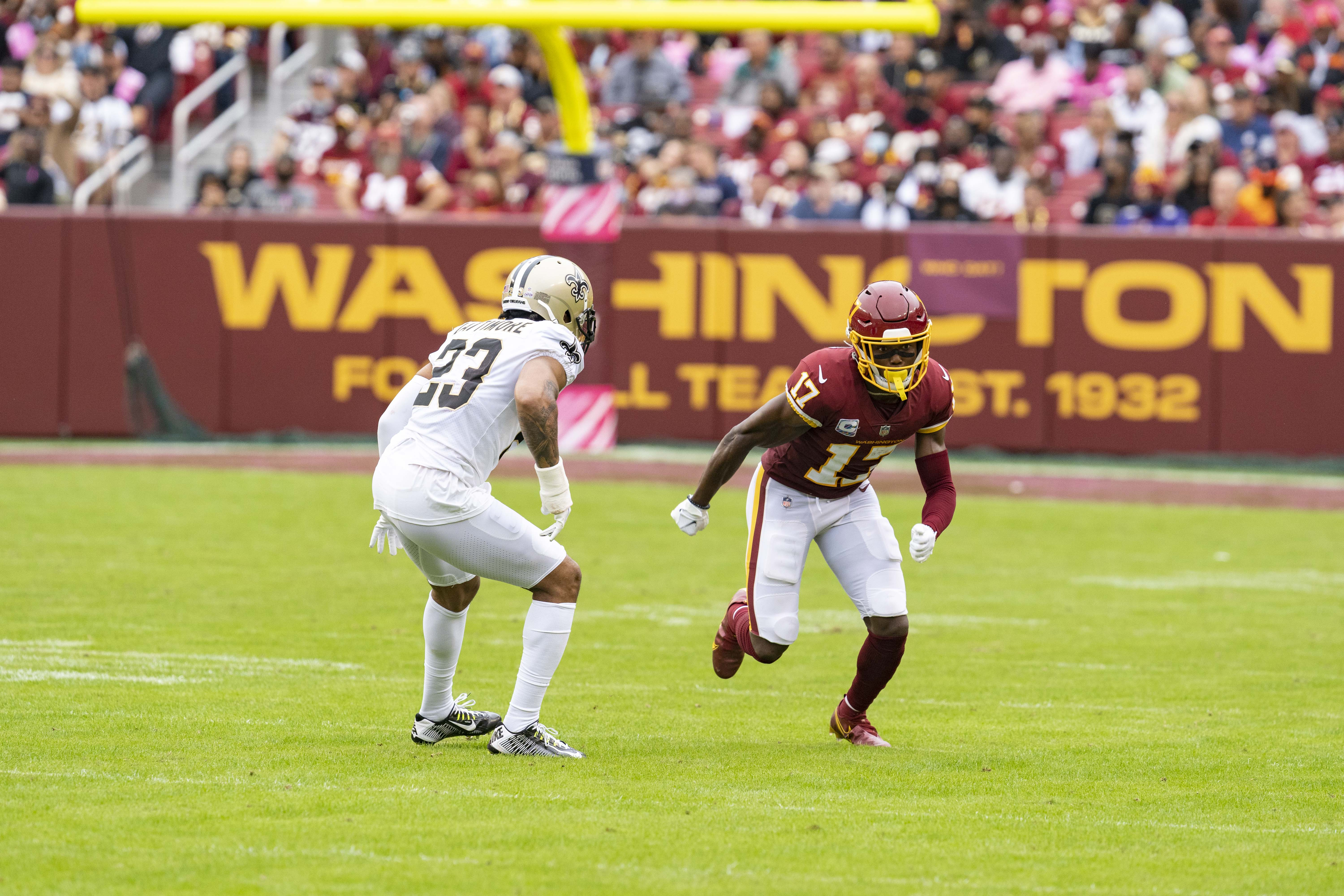
Lattimore defending against Terry McLaurin of the Washington Football Team, 2021

He was inactive during a 7–26 loss at the Carolina Panthers in Week 2 due to a hand injury. On September 26, 2021, Lattimore collected a season-high ten combined tackles (eight solo), made a pass deflection, and intercepted a pass by Mac Jones to wide receiver Nelson Agholor during a 28–13 victory at the New England Patriots. In Week 5, Lattimore had one tackle and a career-high six pass deflections during a 33–22 win at the Washington Football Team, earning NFC Defensive Player of the Week. In Week 13, he made eight combined tackles (five solo), three pass deflections, and intercepted a pass thrown by Dak Prescott to CeeDee Lamb as the Saints lost 27–17 to the Dallas Cowboys. He finished with 68 total tackles (55 solo), three interceptions, 19 passes defended, and one fumble recovery in 16 games and 16 starts. He was ranked 89th by his fellow players on the NFL Top 100 Players of 2022. His overall grade of 77.3 from Pro Football Focus in 2021, ranked 10th amongst 116 qualifying cornerbacks.

==== 2022 ====
On February 8, 2022, the New Orleans Saints promoted defensive coordinator Dennis Allen to head coach following the retirement of Sean Payton. Head coach Dennis Allen retained Lattimore as the No. 1 starting cornerback and paired him with Paulson Adebo and Bradley Roby. In Week 2, Lattimore had two combined tackles (one solo) and a pass deflection before he was ejected in the fourth quarter after getting into a physical altercation with Mike Evans that was ignited after he exchanged words with Tom Brady and was shoved by Leonard Fournette before being shoved to the turf by Evans as the Saints lost 10–20 to the Tampa Bay Buccaneers. On October 2, 2022, he produced a season-high ten combined tackles (seven solo) during a 25–28 loss to the Minnesota Vikings. On October 9, 2022, Lattimore had one pass deflection before exiting in the second quarter of a 29–22 victory against the Seattle Seahawks after sustaining an abdominal injury during a collision with wide receiver Tyler Lockett. He reportedly suffered a lacerated kidney and two broken ribs. On January 1, 2023, Lattimore returned after missing ten games (Weeks 6–16) and recorded six solo tackles, a season-high two pass deflections, and intercepted a pass thrown by Gardner Minshew to wide receiver A. J. Brown for a 12–yard touchdown in the fourth quarter of a 20–10 victory at the Philadelphia Eagles. He finished the 2022 NFL season with 29 combined tackles (20 solo), one interception, and four passes defended in seven games and seven starts. He was ranked 89th by his fellow players on the NFL Top 100 Players of 2023.

==== 2023 ====
He entered training camp slated as a starting cornerback under new defensive coordinator Joe Woods. Head coach Dennis Allen named Lattimore the No. 1 starting cornerback to begin the season and paired him with Paulson Adebo.

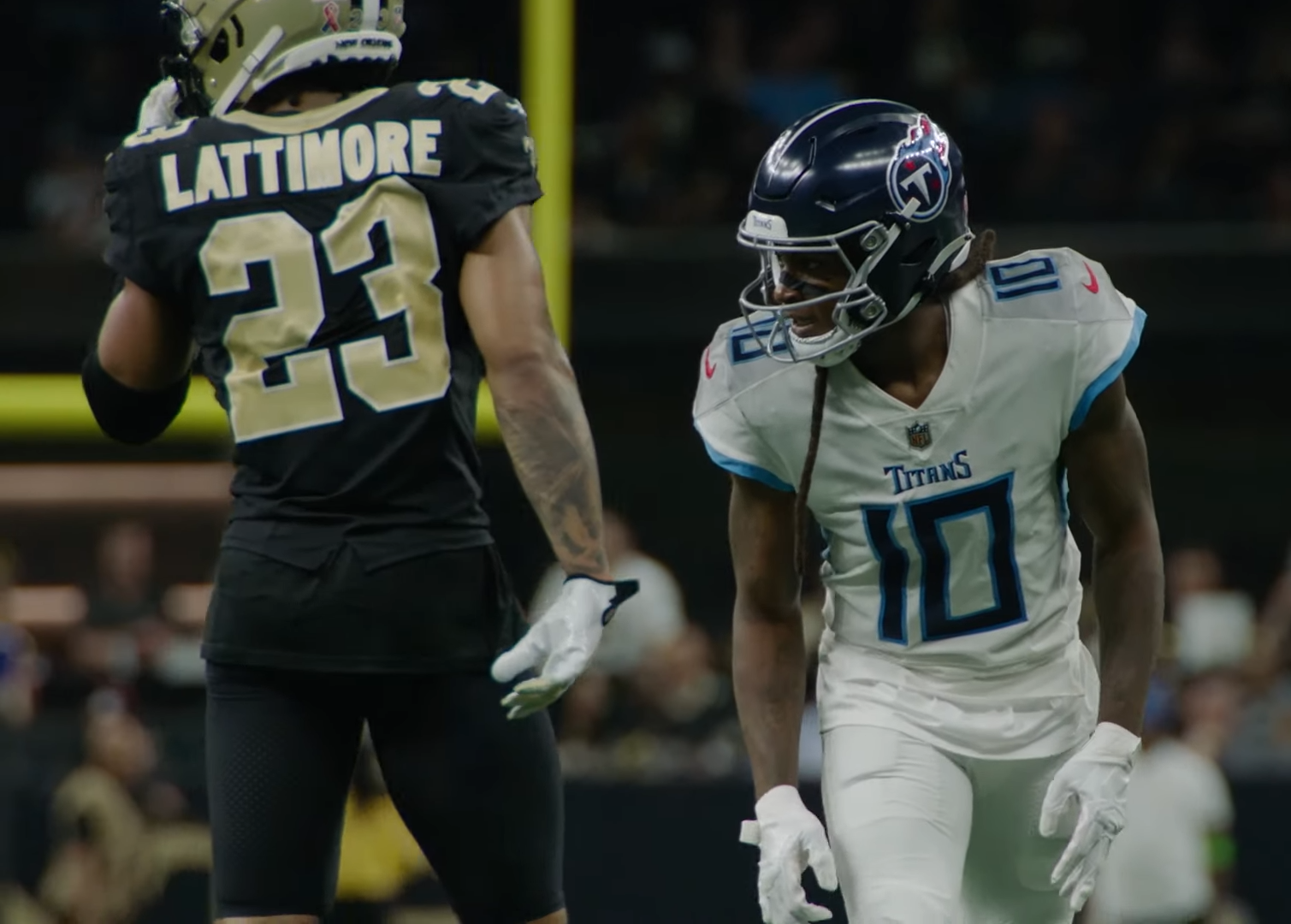
Lattimore defending against DeAndre Hopkins of the Tennessee Titans, 2023

On September 10, 2023, he started in the Saints' home-opener against the Tennessee Titans and made two solo tackles, a season-high four pass deflections, and had his only interception of the season on a pass attempt thrown by Ryan Tannehill to DeAndre Hopkins during a 15–16 victory. In Week 8, he racked up a season-high nine solo tackles and broke up a pass as the Saints won 38–27 at the Indianapolis Colts. In Week 10, he made four combined tackles (three solo) before exiting in the fourth quarter of a 19–27 loss at the Minnesota Vikings after injuring his ankle after it was pinned under players during a tackle. On November 25, 2023, the Saints officially placed Lattimore on injured reserve due to his ankle injury and he remained inactive for the last seven games (Weeks 12–18) of the season. He finished with 48 combined tackles (39 solo), one interception, and eight passes defended in ten games and ten starts. He received an overall grade of 67.4 from Pro Football Focus in 2023.

==== 2024 ====
He returned as the No. 1 starting cornerback and was paired with Paulson Adebo for the fourth consecutive season. He was inactive during a 44–19 win at the Dallas Cowboys in Week 2 after injuring his hip. He was inactive for the Saints' 22–23 loss at the Carolina Panthers in Week 9 due to a hamstring injury. On October 13, 2024, Lattimore collected a season-high ten combined tackles (six solo) as the Saints were routed 27–51 by the Tampa Bay Buccaneers. On November 4, 2024, the Saints announced their decision to fire head coach Dennis Allen after suffering seven consecutive losses that led them falling to a 2–7 record and appointed special teams coordinator Darren Rizzi to interim head coach.

=== Washington Commanders ===
==== 2024 ====
On November 5, 2024, the Saints traded Lattimore and a 2025 fifth-round pick (which they later traded to the San Francisco 49ers) to the Washington Commanders in exchange for the Commanders' 2025 third (Jonas Sanker), fourth (Quincy Riley), and sixth-round picks (with the last pick originally traded by the Saints earlier for John Ridgeway III) in the 2025 NFL draft.

He remained inactive for the first four games (Weeks 11–14) due to his hamstring injury. Head coach Dan Quinn named him the No. 1 starting cornerback and paired him with Mike Sainristil. In Week 15, he made his debut with the Commanders during a 20–19 win at the New Orleans Saints, as his former team targeted him zero times. On December 22, 2024, Lattimore made four combined tackles (three solo) and made a season-high three pass deflections during a 36–33 win against the Philadelphia Eagles. He aggravated his hamstring injury and subsequently missed the last two games (Weeks 17–18) of the season. He finished the season with a total of 34 combined tackles (25 solo) and five pass deflections in nine games and nine starts.

The Washington Commanders finished the 2024 NFL season second in the NFC East with a 12–5 record and clinched a Wildcard berth. On January 12, 2025, Lattimore started in the NFC Wildcard Round at the Tampa Bay Buccaneers and recorded seven combined tackles (four solo) during a 23–20 victory. The following week, the Washington Commanders won 45–31 at the Detroit Lions in the Divisional Round. On January 26, 2025, he made three solo tackles and two pass deflections during a 23–55 loss in the NFC Championship at the Philadelphia Eagles, who went on to win Super Bowl LIX.

==== 2025 ====
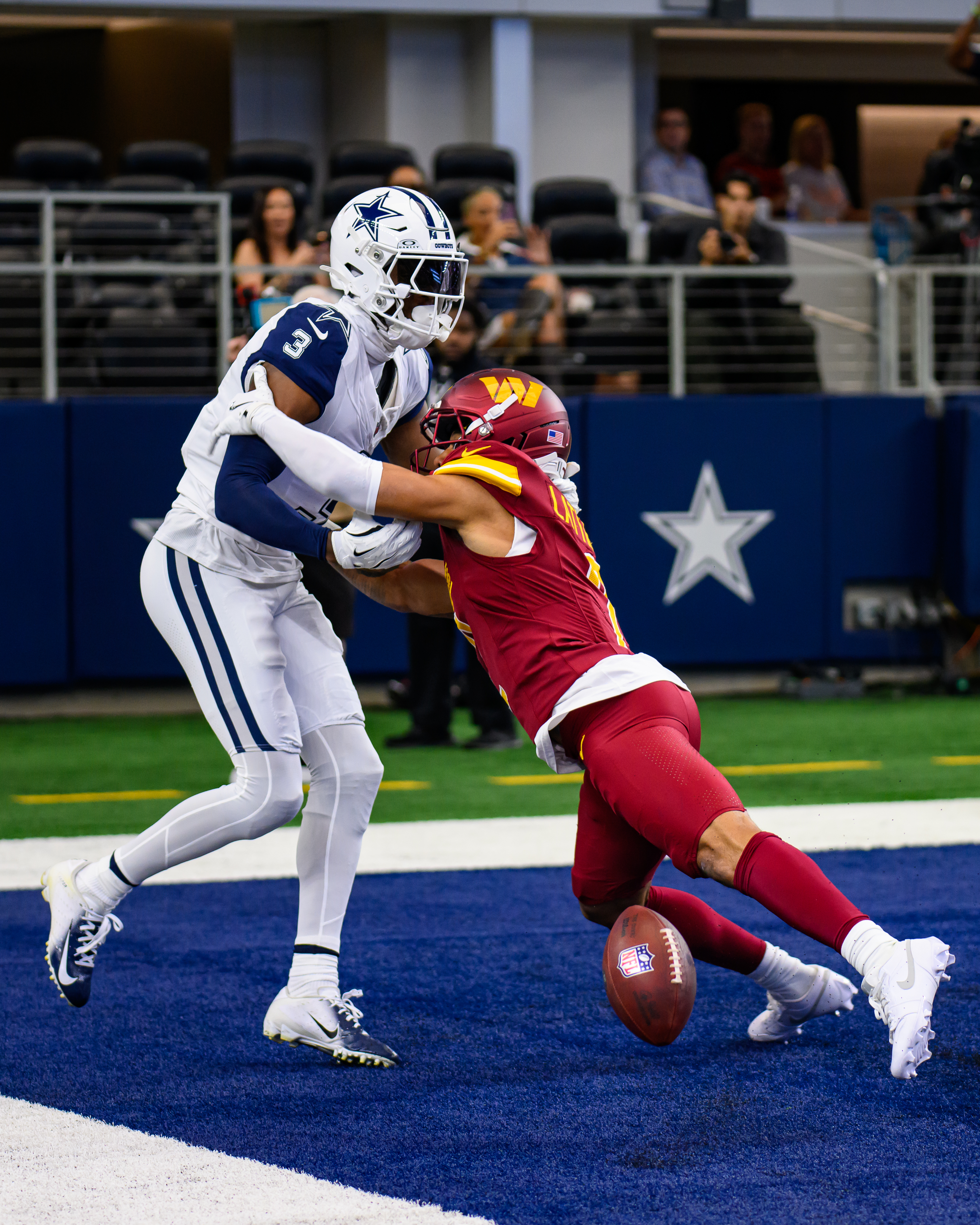
Lattimore playing against Dallas Cowboys wide receiver, George Pickens, in 2025

In April 2025, Lattimore chose to switch his jersey number from 23 to 2, the latter being the number he wore in college. During their week 5 victory against the Los Angeles Chargers, Lattimore scooped up Washington's first fumble recovery of the season after a fumble by Quentin Johnston. In the Week 8 loss to the Kansas City Chiefs, Lattimore recorded his first interception of the season and first since joining the Commanders. On November 4, 2025, Lattimore was placed on injured reserve after tearing his ACL in the third quarter of the team's Week 9 matchup against the Seattle Seahawks. On March 6, 2026, the Commanders released Lattimore.

== NFL career statistics ==
Legend
	Led the league
**Bold**	Career high

=== Regular season ===
Regular season statistics
Year	Team	Games		Tackles				Interceptions				Fumbles			
Year	Team	GP	GS	Cmb	Solo	Ast	Sck	Int	Yds	TD	PD	FF	FR	Yds	TD
2017	NO	13	13	52	43	9	–	**5**	**85**	**1**	18	1	1	0	0
2018	NO	16	16	59	49	10	–	2	0	0	12	**4**	**3**	**91**	0
2019	NO	14	14	57	46	11	–	1	0	0	14	–	–	–	–
2020	NO	14	14	62	52	10	–	2	13	0	11	–	–	–	–
2021	NO	16	16	**68**	**55**	**13**	–	3	35	0	**19**	–	1	1	0
2022	NO	7	7	29	20	9	–	1	12	**1**	4	–	–	–	–
2023	NO	10	10	48	39	9	–	1	0	0	8	–	–	–	–
2024	NO	7	7	30	22	8	–	–	–	–	2	–	–	–	–
2024	WAS	2	2	4	3	1	–	–	–	–	3	–	–	–	–
2025	WAS	9	9	27	16	11	–	1	0	0	7	0	1	0	0
Career		108	108	436	345	91	–	16	145	2	98	5	6	92	–

=== Postseason ===
Postseason statistics
Year	Team	Games		Tackles				Interceptions				Fumbles			
Year	Team	GP	GS	Cmb	Solo	Ast	Sck	Int	Yds	TD	PD	FF	FR	Yds	TD
2017	NO	2	2	6	6	0	–	–	–	–	**4**	–	–	–	–
2018	NO	2	2	10	9	1	–	**2**	**14**	0	2	–	–	–	–
2019	NO	1	1	4	4	0	–	–	–	–	–	–	–	–	–
2020	NO	2	2	3	2	1	–	–	–	–	**4**	–	–	–	–
2024	WAS	**3**	**3**	**15**	**11**	**4**	–	–	–	–	2	–	–	–	–
Career		10	10	38	32	6	–	2	14	0	12	–	–	–	–

== Legal issues ==
On March 25, 2021, Lattimore was arrested for possession of a handgun that was believed to be stolen and was charged with possession of a concealed weapon and stolen property. He denied that the gun was stolen and was sentenced to a year of probation and fined $1,000 after pleading guilty to a misdemeanor charge of failing to inform officers that he was in possession of a concealed handgun, which he held a permit to carry.

On January 8, 2026, Lattimore was arrested in Lakewood, Ohio on charges of failing to disclose a concealed weapon.
