= P. J. Williams =

American football player (born 1993)

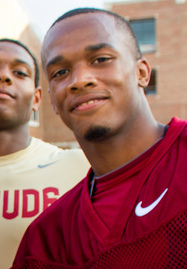
- Williams in 2013

No. 25, 26
- Position: Safety

Personal information
- Born: June 1, 1993 (age 33); Ocala, Florida, U.S.
- Listed height: 6 ft 0 in (1.83 m)
- Listed weight: 196 lb (89 kg)

Career information
- High school: Vanguard (Ocala)
- College: Florida State (2012–2014)
- NFL draft: 2015: 3rd round, 78th overall pick

Career history
- New Orleans Saints (2015–2022)

Awards and highlights
- BCS national champion (2013); First-team All-ACC (2014)

Career NFL statistics
- Total tackles: 259
- Sacks: 4.0
- Pass deflections: 33
- Interceptions: 8
- Forced fumbles: 3
- Fumble recoveries: 2
- Defensive touchdowns: 2
- Stats at Pro Football Reference

Kenneth Lamar "P. J." Williams (born June 1, 1993) is an American former professional football player who was a safety in the National Football League (NFL). He played college football for the Florida State Seminoles. He was the Defensive MVP of the 2014 BCS National Championship Game.

== Early life ==
Williams attended Vanguard High School in Ocala, Florida, where he played high school football. He played cornerback and wide receiver. He was ranked by Rivals.com as the nations ninth best safety recruit.

In addition to football, he was also a sprinter for the track team. He ran a career-best time of 10.68 seconds in the 100 meters at the prelims of the 2011 FHSAA 3A District 5 Championships.

== College career ==
As a true freshman in 2012, Williams played in 14 games recording 14 tackles. As a sophomore in 2013, Williams made 35 tackles, had three interceptions and scored a touchdown. He was the Defensive MVP of the 2014 BCS National Championship Game after recording seven tackles and an interception. As a junior in 2014, Williams had 74 tackles, one interception and one sack.

On January 6, 2015, Williams announced via Twitter that he decided to forgo his senior season and declare himself eligible for the 2015 NFL draft. He stated, "I will be taking my talent to the NFL, I wanna thank the NoleNation for some of the best 3 years of my life, the memories will never fade!"

== Professional career ==
=== Pre-draft ===
Williams was one of 54 collegiate defensive backs to attend the NFL Scouting Combine in Indianapolis, Indiana. He performed all of the combine drills and finished first among all defensive backs in the broad jump and third in the vertical jump. His mediocre time in the 40-yard dash was seen as a disappointment by scouts and analysts. On March 31, 2015, Williams attended Florida State's pro day and chose to stand on the majority of numbers from the combine. He posted better times in the 40-yard dash (4.48s), 20-yard dash (2.55s), and 10-yard dash (1.58s), while also improving his vertical (41") and broad jump (11'3"). He showed smooth and fluid movement and displayed good hands in his position drills despite being sick with the flu. Over 150 scouts, team representatives, and media members attended Florida State's pro day, including head coaches Sean Payton (New Orleans Saints), Lovie Smith (Tampa Bay Buccaneers), Mike Tomlin (Pittsburgh Steelers), Todd Bowles (New York Jets), and Ken Whisenhunt (Tennessee Titans). During the draft process, Williams had private workouts and meetings with a few teams, including Buccaneers, Detroit Lions, Baltimore Ravens, and Dallas Cowboys. On April 3, 2015, Williams was arrested for DUI, but charges were dropped for insufficient evidence on April 27. 2015. At the conclusion of the pre-draft process, NFL draft experts and scouts projected Williams to be a late first or second round pick. He was ranked the third best cornerback in the draft by Sports Illustrated, the fifth best cornerback by NFL analyst Charles Davis, was ranked the ninth best cornerback in the draft by NFL analyst Mike Mayock, and was ranked the 10th best cornerback prospect in the draft by NFLDraftScout.com.

Pre-draft measurables
Height	Weight	Arm length	Hand span	Wingspan	40-yard dash	10-yard split	20-yard split	20-yard shuttle	Three-cone drill	Vertical jump	Broad jump	Bench press
6 ft 0 in (1.83 m)	194 lb (88 kg)	31 in (0.79 m)	8 5/8 in (0.22 m)	6 ft 4 1/8 in (1.93 m)	4.48 s	1.48 s	2.55 s	4.28 s	7.08 s	41.0 in (1.04 m)	11 ft 3 in (3.43 m)	12 reps
All values from NFL Combine/Pro Day

=== 2015 ===
The New Orleans Saints selected Williams in the third round (78th overall) of the 2015 NFL draft. Williams unexpectedly fell to the Saints in the third round and was the 11th cornerback drafted in 2015. The pick used to select Williams originally was acquired from the Miami Dolphins along with Dannell Ellerbe in exchange for Kenny Stills.

On May 12, 2015, the Saints signed Williams to a four-year, $3.06 million contract and includes a signing bonus of $706,619.

Throughout training camp, Williams competed against Kyle Wilson, Damian Swann, Stanley Jean-Baptiste, and Delvin Breaux for the starting nickelback on the depth chart. On September 1, 2015, the Saints placed Williams on injured reserve after suffering a torn hamstring. He did not appear in any games during his rookie season and defensive coordinator Rob Ryan was fired in November.

=== 2016 ===
Williams returned in time for organized team activities and training camp. He competed for the starting nickelback job against Damian Swann and received snaps at outside corner while Keenan Lewis was out with an injury. Payton named Williams the starting cornerback, along with Breaux, after the Saints opted to release Lewis.

He made his professional regular season debut and first career start in the Saints' season-opener against the Oakland Raiders and recorded five combined tackles and a pass deflection in their 35–34 loss. On September 21, 2016, Williams suffered a serious concussion while attempting to make a tackle on New York Giants tight end Larry Donnell. During the play, Donnell's right leg appeared to strike Williams' shoulder while he attempted to tackle Donnell and then took an accidental knee to the back of the helmet by Saints' linebacker Craig Robertson. The force snapped Williams head and neck back. Williams crumbled to the ground and players began frantically signaling for trainer that immediately responded and strapped Williams to a backboard and carted him off the field. It was reported he had movement of his extremities and was transported to a local hospital for testing and evaluation. Williams finished the 16–13 loss at the Giants with two solo tackles and a pass deflection. On September 21, 2016, the Saints placed Williams on injured reserve for the remainder of the season after he was diagnosed with a concussion. He finished the 2016 season with seven combined tackles (five solo) and two pass deflections in two games and two starts.

=== 2017 ===
Williams entered training camp competing for a job as the starting cornerback, opposite Breaux, against rookie first round pick Marshon Lattimore. Payton named him one of the starting cornerbacks with Ken Crawley to begin the regular season after Breaux suffered a fractured fibula during camp.

He started the Saints' season-opener at the Minnesota Vikings and recorded eight combined tackles during their 29–19 loss. The following week, he recorded a season-high ten combined tackles and a pass deflection in the Saints' 36–20 loss to the New England Patriots. On September 24, 2017, Williams made three combined tackles, deflected a pass, and made his first career interception off a pass attempt by Cam Newton in New Orleans' 34–13 victory. Although he played well, Williams was demoted to a reserve role behind Marshon Lattimore and Ken Crawley due to an unspecified disciplinary issue prior to their Week 4 matchup at the Miami Dolphins. Payton declined to further comment on the matter, stating it was between the team and Williams. In Week 9, Williams recorded two combined tackles and deflected a pass during a 30–10 victory over the Buccaneers after returning from a four-game stretch where he did not record a stat. On November 26, 2017, he made three solo tackles, three pass deflections, and intercepted Jared Goff in the Saints' 26–20 loss at the Los Angeles Rams. Williams finished the 2017 season with 47 combined tackles (34 solo), nine pass deflections, and two interceptions in 16 games and six starts.

The Saints finished the season first in the NFC South with an 11–5 record and received a wildcard playoff berth. On January 7, 2018, Williams played in his first playoff game and recorded a tackle and a pass deflection during the Saints' 31–26 victory over the Carolina Panthers in the NFC Wildcard game. The following week, he recorded four combined tackles and defended a pass as the Saints lost 29–24 at the Vikings.

=== 2018 ===
In Week 8, Williams intercepted a pass from quarterback Kirk Cousins and returned it 45 yards for the touchdown in a 30–20 win over the Vikings, earning him NFC Defensive Player of the Week.

=== 2019 ===
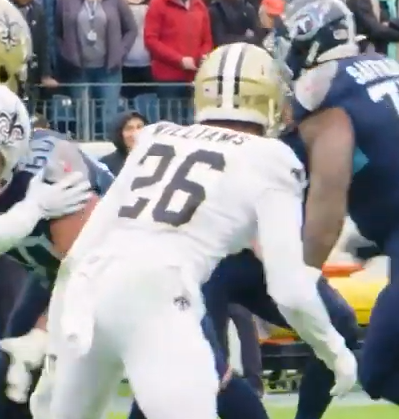
Williams in a game against the Tennessee Titans

On April 2, 2019, Williams re-signed with the Saints. He was suspended for two games on October 15, 2019, for violating the NFL's substance abuse policy. He was reinstated from suspension on October 29, 2019, and the team received a roster exemption for him. He was activated the next day. In week 11 against the Buccaneers, Williams recorded his first interception of the season off a pass thrown by Jameis Winston in the 34–17 win.

=== 2020 ===
On April 7, 2020, the Saints re-signed Williams to a one-year, $2 million contract.

In Week 2 against the Las Vegas Raiders on Monday Night Football, Williams recovered a fumble lost by running back Jalen Richard during the 34–24 loss. In Week 17 against the Panthers, Williams recorded his first interception of the season off a pass thrown by P. J. Walker during the 33–7 win.

=== 2021 ===
On March 29, 2021, Williams re-signed with the Saints on a one-year contract. In a game against the Buccaneers on October 31, 2021, Williams intercepted Tom Brady's pass intended for Chris Godwin and returned it 40 yards for a game-clinching pick six, and his second career defensive touchdown.

=== 2022 ===
On April 4, 2022, Williams re-signed with the Saints on a one-year contract. He was placed on injured reserve on October 8. He was activated on November 7.

== NFL career statistics ==
Legend
**Bold**	Career high

=== Regular season ===
Year	Team	Games		Tackles					Interceptions					Fumbles			
Year	Team	GP	GS	Cmb	Solo	Ast	Sck	TFL	Int	Yds	TD	Lng	PD	FF	FR	Yds	TD
2016	NOR	2	2	7	5	2	0.0	0	0	0	0	0	2	0	0	0	0
2017	NOR	**16**	6	47	34	**13**	0.0	1	2	7	0	7	**9**	0	0	0	0
2018	NOR	15	7	**53**	**44**	9	1.0	2	1	45	**1**	45	**9**	**2**	0	0	0
2019	NOR	14	**8**	44	34	10	1.0	**3**	1	0	0	0	4	0	0	0	0
2020	NOR	15	3	40	31	9	0.0	0	1	30	0	30	2	0	**2**	0	0
2021	NOR	**16**	5	42	36	6	**2.0**	**3**	**3**	**86**	**1**	**46**	5	1	0	0	0
2022	NOR	11	3	26	17	9	0.0	0	0	0	0	0	2	0	0	0	0
		89	34	259	201	58	4.0	9	8	168	2	46	33	3	2	0	0

=== Playoffs ===
Year	Team	Games		Tackles					Interceptions					Fumbles			
Year	Team	GP	GS	Cmb	Solo	Ast	Sck	TFL	Int	Yds	TD	Lng	PD	FF	FR	Yds	TD
2017	NOR	**2**	0	5	4	1	0.0	0	0	0	0	0	**2**	0	0	0	0
2018	NOR	**2**	**2**	**11**	**9**	**2**	0.0	0	0	0	0	0	**2**	0	0	0	0
2019	NOR	1	0	0	0	0	0.0	0	0	0	0	0	1	0	0	0	0
2020	NOR	**2**	0	1	1	0	0.0	0	0	0	0	0	1	0	0	0	0
		7	2	17	14	3	0.0	0	0	0	0	0	6	0	0	0	0

== Personal life ==
On October 5, 2014, Williams was involved in a car accident in Tallahassee, Florida. He and his two passengers, including teammate Ronald Darby, left the accident scene. Williams returned a short time later, the police officer on scene reported that Williams stated that his phone was dead and he went to make a phone call. The Tallahassee Police Department initially identified the accident as a hit and run, but downgraded the incident, issuing Williams two tickets one for driving on a suspended license. The accident was not included in Tallahassee's public online database of police calls.

On April 3, 2015, Williams was arrested for DUI in Tallahassee, Florida. Williams was pulled over after making an illegal left turn and swerving while he was driving a rental vehicle on a suspended license. The officer claimed Williams had blood shot and watery eyes and displayed slurred speech. He was arrested after declining to perform a field sobriety test and to take a breathalyzer at Leon County Jail. On April 27, 2015, it was reported that the DUI charge had been dropped. Paperwork filed by the state attorney stated, "The state is unable" to prove that Williams was driving and that his faculties were impaired by alcohol."
