= Ken Crawley =

American football player (born 1993)

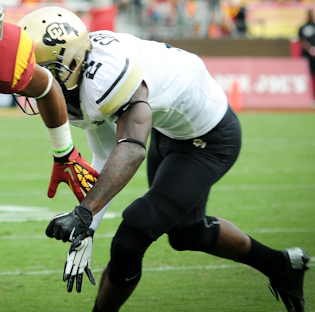
- Crawley with the Colorado Buffaloes in 2012

No. 46, 20, 32, 25
- Position: Cornerback

Personal information
- Born: February 8, 1993 (age 33); Washington, D.C., U.S.
- Listed height: 6 ft 1 in (1.85 m)
- Listed weight: 180 lb (82 kg)

Career information
- High school: H.D. Woodson (Washington, D.C.)
- College: Colorado
- NFL draft: 2016: undrafted

Career history
- New Orleans Saints (2016–2019); Miami Dolphins (2019); Las Vegas Raiders (2020)*; Arizona Cardinals (2020)*; New Orleans Saints (2020–2021); San Francisco 49ers (2022)*
- * Offseason or practice squad member only

Career NFL statistics
- Total tackles: 138
- Forced fumbles: 1
- Fumble recoveries: 2
- Pass deflections: 32
- Interceptions: 2
- Stats at Pro Football Reference

Ken Crawley (born February 8, 1993) is an American former professional football player who was a cornerback in the National Football League (NFL). He played college football for the Colorado Buffaloes. He was a member of the New Orleans Saints, Miami Dolphins, Las Vegas Raiders, Arizona Cardinals and San Francisco 49ers.

== Professional career ==
Pre-draft measurables
Height	Weight	Arm length	Hand span	40-yard dash	10-yard split	20-yard split	20-yard shuttle	Three-cone drill	Vertical jump	Broad jump	Bench press
6 ft 0 3/8 in (1.84 m)	187 lb (85 kg)	30 1/2 in (0.77 m)	9 in (0.23 m)	4.43 s	1.53 s	2.57 s	4.30 s	6.81 s	36 1/2 in (0.93 m)	9 ft 11 in (3.02 m)	7 reps
All values from NFL Combine/Colorado's Pro Day

=== New Orleans Saints (first stint) ===
==== 2016 ====
On May 1, 2016, the New Orleans Saints signed Crawley to a three-year, $1.62 million contract as an undrafted free agent that includes a signing bonus of $5,000.

Throughout training camp, he competed for a roster spot against De'Vante Harris, Brandon Dixon, Brian Dixon, Damian Swann, Tony Carter, and Jimmy Pruitt. Crawley made a strong case for a spot on the active roster after turning in multiple impressive performances in practice while taking first team reps at outside cornerback while Keenan Lewis, Delvin Breaux, and Swann were sidelined with injuries. After the release of Lewis, head coach Sean Payton named Crawley the third cornerback on the depth chart behind starters Breaux and P. J. Williams.

He made his professional regular season debut in the Saints' season-opener against the Oakland Raiders and recorded four solo tackles during their 35–34 loss. The following week, Crawley collected six combined tackles, deflected a pass, and forced the first fumble of his career as the Saints lost 16–13 at the New York Giants. During the first quarter, De'Vante Harris recovered the fumble after Crawley caused a fumble while tackling Giants' receiver Victor Cruz with teammate Jairus Byrd. On September 26, 2016, Crawley made his first career start after Williams was placed on injured reserve after suffering a serious concussion the week before. Crawley finished the Saints' 45–32 loss against the Atlanta Falcons with four solo tackles and two pass deflections. In Week 4, he made a season-high seven combined tackles and a pass deflection during their 35–34 win at the San Diego Chargers. Prior to Week 9, Crawley was demoted to a reserve role behind Sterling Moore and B. W. Webb. On December 28, 2016, Crawley suffered a dislocated knee in practice and was ruled inactive for the Saints' Week 17 matchup against the Falcons. Williams finished his rookie season with 43 combined tackles (40 solo), eight pass deflections, a forced fumble, and a fumble recovery in 15 games and five starts.

==== 2017 ====
Crawley entered training camp competing for the job as the third cornerback on the depth chart against Moore and rookie Marshon Lattimore. Head coach Sean Payton named Crawley the starting cornerback alongside Williams after Breaux suffered a fractured fibula.

External videos
- Ken Crawley leaps for an early interception

Crawley was inactive for the first two games (Weeks 1–2). On September 24, 2017, he started his first game of the season and recorded a season-high eight combined tackles and a pass deflection. In Week 3, Crawley made four solo tackles, two deflected passes, and made his first career interception off a pass attempt by Jay Cutler during the Saints' 20–0 victory against the Miami Dolphins. He was inactive for the Saints' Week 12 matchup at the Los Angeles Rams due to a strained oblique. He finished the 2017 season 54 combined tackles (47 solo), 17 pass deflections, and an interception in 13 games and 13 starts. He finished second on the team in pass deflections behind rookie Marshon Lattimore. He received an overall grade of 81.6 from Pro Football Focus, which was the 39th highest grade among cornerbacks.

The New Orleans Saints finished first in the NFC South with an 11–5 record. On January 7, 2018, Crawley started his first career playoff game and recorded seven combined tackles and a pass deflection in the Saints' 31–26 victory against the Carolina Panthers in the NFC Wildcard game. The following week, he had six combined tackles as New Orleans lost 29–24 at the Minnesota Vikings. Crawley was flagged for pass interference on two consecutive plays in the first quarter. The two penalties combined for 54-yards and led to a field goal for the Minnesota Vikings. He was also on the receiving end of a missed tackle by fellow free safety Marcus Williams that knocked him over when the latter was attempting to tackle an airborne Stefon Diggs on the final play of the game, which prevented both of them from having a chance to tackle Diggs. Diggs, in turn, was able to score a touchdown on that play to win the game for Minnesota.

==== 2018 ====
Crawley entered training camp stated as a starting cornerback. Head coach Sean Payton named Crawley and Marshon Lattimore the starting cornerbacks to begin the regular season, alongside nickelback Patrick Robinson.

==== 2019 ====
On October 29, 2019, Crawley was released by the Saints.

=== Miami Dolphins ===
On October 30, 2019, Crawley was claimed off waivers by the Miami Dolphins. He was waived/injured on December 4, 2019 and placed on injured reserve. He was released on December 16.

=== Las Vegas Raiders ===
On January 23, 2020, Crawley was signed by the Las Vegas Raiders to a reserve/future contract. He was released on August 18, 2020.

=== Arizona Cardinals ===
On August 21, 2020, Crawley was signed by the Arizona Cardinals. On September 5, 2020, Crawley was released during final roster cuts.

=== New Orleans Saints (second stint) ===
On September 28, 2020, Crawley was signed to the Saints practice squad. He was elevated to the active roster on October 3 for the team's week 4 game against the Detroit Lions, and reverted to the practice squad after the game. He was promoted to the active roster on October 12, 2020. He was placed on the reserve/COVID-19 list by the team on October 23, and activated on October 28. In Week 17 against the Panthers, Crawley recorded his first interception of the season off a pass thrown by P. J. Walker during the 33–7 win.

On May 17, 2021, Crawley re-signed with the Saints. He was placed on injured reserve on September 10, 2021. He was activated on November 13. He was waived on November 20. He was re-signed three days later.

=== San Francisco 49ers ===
On August 10, 2022, Crawley signed with the San Francisco 49ers. He was released on August 29.
