= A. J. Klein =

American football player (born 1991)

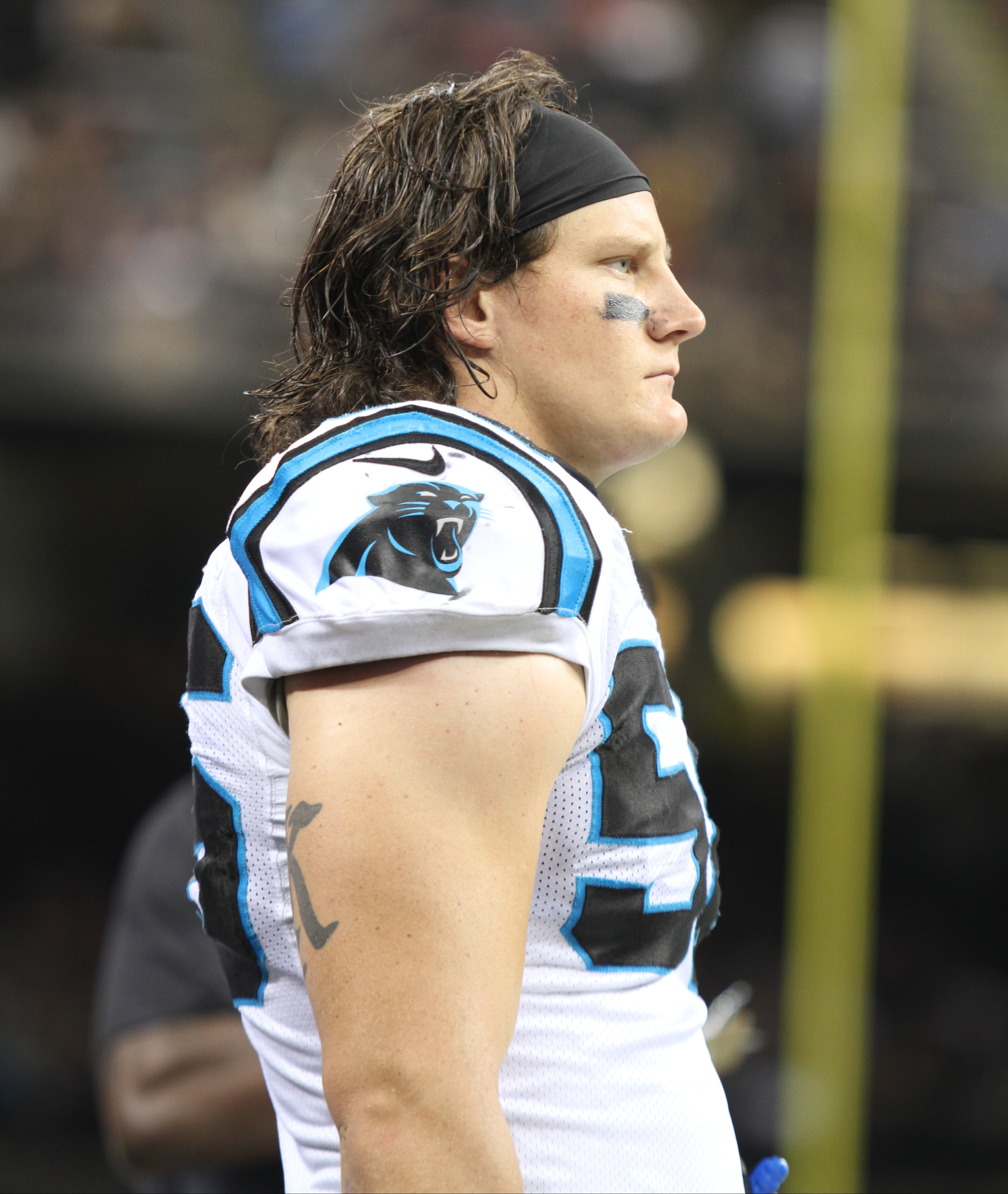
- Klein with the Carolina Panthers in 2015

No. 56, 53, 54, 59, 47, 52
- Position: Linebacker

Personal information
- Born: July 30, 1991 (age 35); Appleton, Wisconsin, U.S.
- Listed height: 6 ft 1 in (1.85 m)
- Listed weight: 240 lb (109 kg)

Career information
- High school: Kimberly (Kimberly, Wisconsin)
- College: Iowa State (2009–2012)
- NFL draft: 2013: 5th round, 148th overall pick

Career history
- Carolina Panthers (2013–2016); New Orleans Saints (2017–2019); Buffalo Bills (2020–2021); New York Giants (2022)*; Baltimore Ravens (2022); Chicago Bears (2022); Buffalo Bills (2022–2023)
- * Offseason or practice squad member only

Awards and highlights
- Big 12 co-Defensive Player of the Year (2011); 2× First-team All-Big 12 (2011, 2012)

Career NFL statistics
- Total tackles: 465
- Sacks: 15.5
- Forced fumbles: 8
- Fumble recoveries: 4
- Pass deflections: 20
- Interceptions: 4
- Defensive touchdowns: 1
- Stats at Pro Football Reference

Aaron James Klein (born July 30, 1991) is an American former professional football player who was a linebacker for 11 seasons in the National Football League (NFL). He played college football for the Iowa State Cyclones. He was selected by the Carolina Panthers in the fifth round of the 2013 NFL draft.

== Early life ==
Klein attended Kimberly High School where he was a letterman in football and track. His football team went 37–1 during his career. He led team to back-to-back Division II state championships in his final two seasons. He recorded 121 tackles, five sacks, three forced fumbles and two fumble recoveries as a senior, and his career included 287 tackles, 17 sacks and two interceptions.

In track & field, Klein competed as a sprinter in spring of 2008. During the indoor season, he competed in the 55-meter dash and recorded a personal-best time of 7.01 seconds at the Oshkosh HS Invite. He competed in the 100-meter dash during the outdoor season, earning a 5th-place finish at the WIAA Regional with a time of 11.8 seconds.

Considered a three-star recruit by Rivals.com, he accepted a scholarship offer from Iowa State over offers from Northern Illinois, Western Michigan and Wyoming.

== College career ==
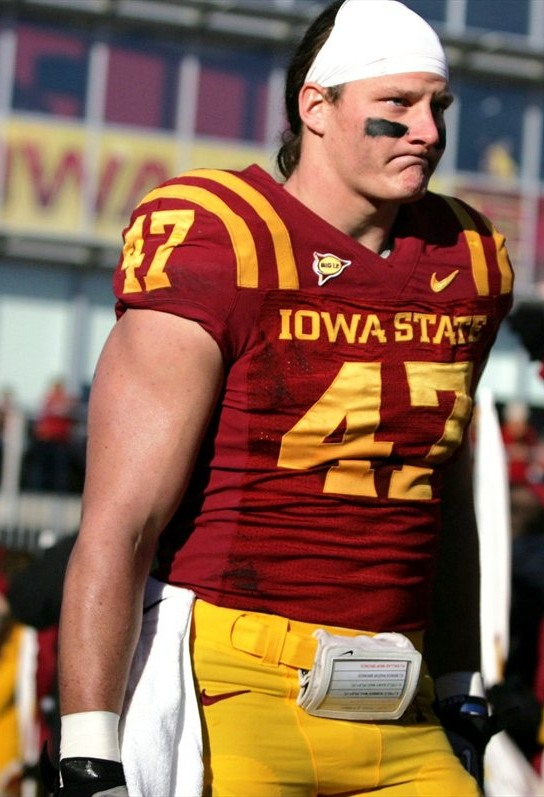
Klein at Iowa State in 2012

While attending Iowa State University, Klein was a member of the Iowa State Cyclones football team from 2009 to 2012. He played in every game as a true freshman finishing the season with 17 tackles, and also caused and recovered a fumble. He played in 12 games, starting 10, as a sophomore, and finished second on the team in tackles with 111, including eight for loss. He also had three interceptions (returning 2 for touchdowns), four pass deflections, and a fumble recovery. In 2011, he started in all 13 games, recording 116 tackles, including 7.5 tackles for loss and two sacks, seven pass deflections, six pass break ups, and an interception (returned for a touchdown). He was named Big 12 Co-Defensive Player of the Year and earned All-Big 12 first-team honors. In his senior season, he recorded 117 tackles, including 3.5 tackles for loss and one sack, three pass deflections, two pass break ups and an interception (returned for a touchdown). He earned All-Big 12 first-team honors once again.

== Professional career ==
Pre-draft measurables
Height	Weight	Arm length	Hand span	40-yard dash	10-yard split	20-yard split	20-yard shuttle	Three-cone drill	Vertical jump	Broad jump	Bench press
6 ft 1 1/4 in (1.86 m)	250 lb (113 kg)	32 7/8 in (0.84 m)	10 1/4 in (0.26 m)	4.66 s	1.60 s	2.69 s	4.35 s	7.06 s	33 in (0.84 m)	9 ft 5 in (2.87 m)	24 reps
All values from NFL Combine /Iowa State's Pro Day

=== Carolina Panthers ===
==== 2013 ====
The Carolina Panthers selected Klein in the fifth round (148th overall) of the 2013 NFL draft. Klein was the 16th linebacker drafted in 2013.

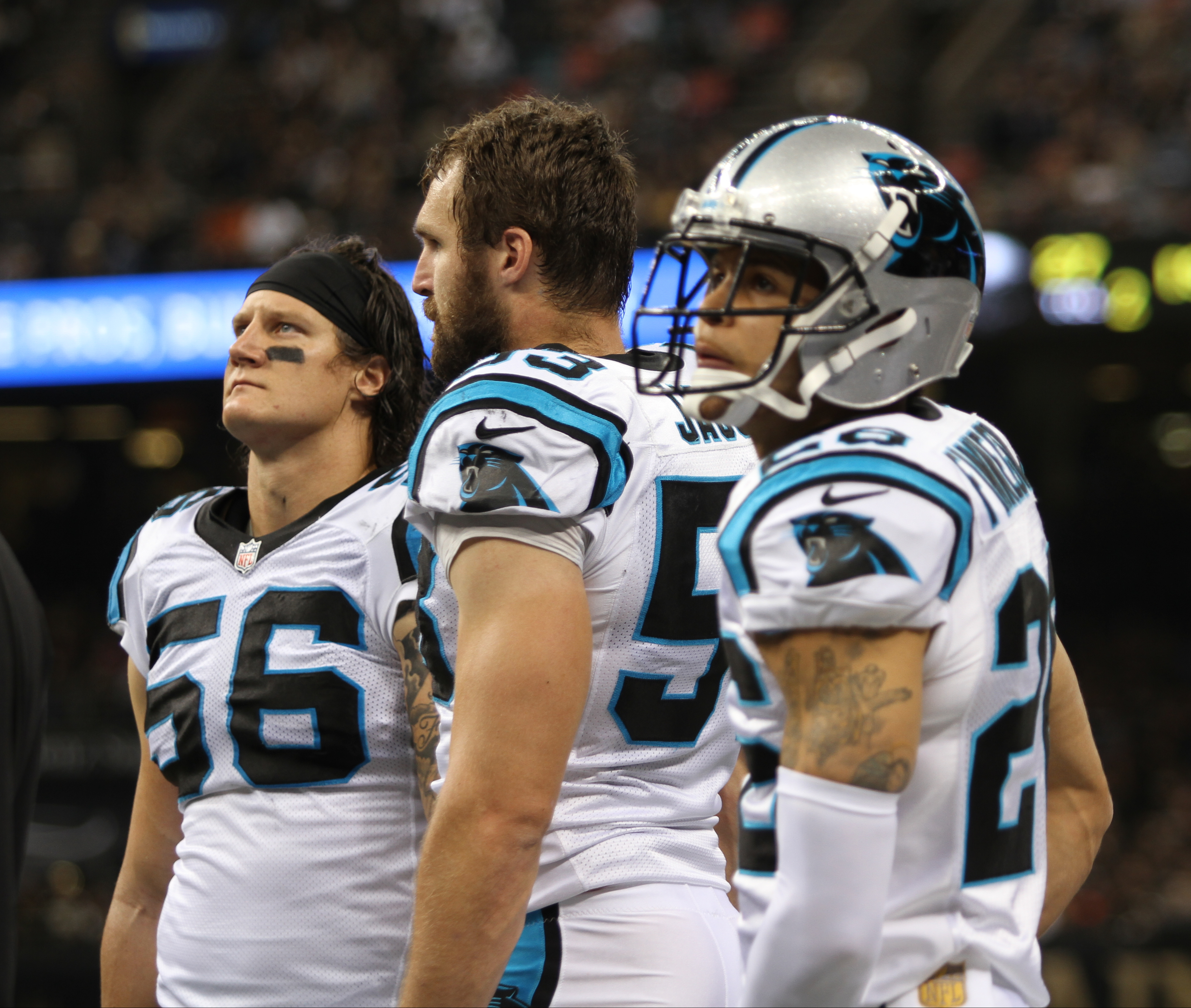
Klein (left) playing for the Panthers in 2015.

On May 23, 2013, the Carolina Panthers signed Klein to a four-year, $2.35 million contract that includes a signing bonus of $191,300.

Throughout training camp, Klein competed against Chase Blackburn, Jordan Senn, Jason Williams, and Doug Hogue for a role as the primary backup outside linebacker. Head coach Ron Rivera named Klein the backup strongside linebacker, behind Thomas Davis, to begin the regular season.

He made his professional regular season debut during the Carolina Panthers' season-opening 12–7 loss against the Seattle Seahawks. On November 10, 2013, Klein earned his first career start after Chase Blackburn was ruled inactive due to a foot injury he sustained the previous week. Klein collected a season-high five solo tackles and made his first career sack during their 10–9 victory at the San Francisco 49ers in Week 10. Klein sacked 49ers' quarterback Colin Kaepernick for a 14-yard loss during the second quarter. He finished his rookie season in 2013 with 21 combined tackles (18 solo) and two sacks in 16 games and two starts.

==== 2014 ====
During training camp in 2014, Klein competed against Chase Blackburn to be a starting outside linebacker. Head coach Ron Rivera named Klein and Thomas Davis the starting outside linebackers to begin the regular season, alongside middle linebacker Luke Kuechly. In Week 4, he collected a season-high seven combined tackles during a 38–10 loss at the Baltimore Ravens. Klein was inactive for the last two games (Weeks 16–17) due to an ankle injury. He finished the 2014 NFL season with 39 combined tackles (25 solo) in 14 games and eight starts.

The Carolina Panthers finished the 2014 NFL season first in the NFC South with a 7–8–1 record, but Klein was inactive due to his ankle injury as they reached the NFC Divisional Round where they were defeated 31–17 at the Seattle Seahawks.

==== 2015 ====
Klein entered training camp slated as the starting weakside linebacker, but saw competition from rookie first round pick Shaq Thompson. Head coach Ron Rivera named Klein the backup weakside linebacker, behind Shaq Thompson, to begin the regular season. On September 20, 2015, Klein started at middle linebacker after Luke Kuechly was inactive due to a concussion he sustained the previous week. He recorded four combined tackles, one pass deflection, and made his first career interception as the Panthers defeated the Houston Texans 24–17 in Week 2. Klein intercepted a pass by Texans' quarterback Ryan Mallett, that was intended for tight end Garrett Graham, and returned it eight yards during the fourth quarter. In Week 3, he collected a season-high ten combined tackles (six solo) during a 27–22 win against the New Orleans Saints. Klein was inactive for the Panthers' Week 6 victory at the Seattle Seahawks after suffering a concussion during a Week 4 victory at the Tampa Bay Buccaneers. Klein finished the season with 55 combined tackles (39 solo), one pass deflection, one sack, and one interception in 15 games and six starts.

External videos
- Play of the Game: A.J. Klein interception

On February 7, 2016, Klein was part of the Panthers team that played in Super Bowl 50. In the game, the Panthers fell to the Denver Broncos by a score of 24–10.

==== 2016 ====
During Week 10 of the 2016 season, All-Pro starting linebacker Luke Kuechly was severely concussed and did not play the rest of the season. Kuechly's injury thrust Klein into a starting role for the Panthers. In his seven starts, Klein made 16 solo tackles, assisted on 13 more and registered one sack.

=== New Orleans Saints ===
On March 9, 2017, Klein signed a three-year, $15 million contract with the New Orleans Saints. He suffered a groin injury in Week 14 and was placed on injured reserve on December 19, 2017. He started the first 12 games of 2017, recording 54 tackles, two sacks, and four passes defensed.

=== Buffalo Bills (first stint) ===
On March 27, 2020, the Buffalo Bills signed Klein to a three-year, $18 million contract that included $11.30 million guaranteed and a signing bonus of $1.20 million. The signing reunited Klein with Buffalo Bills' head coach Sean McDermott, who previously coached Klein as the Carolina Panthers' defensive coordinator.

Klein was plugged into the starting lineup due to a nagging injury to Matt Milano. Despite struggling throughout much of the first half of the season, Klein had a breakout game against the heavily favored Seattle Seahawks, sacking Russell Wilson twice, including a strip sack which he also recovered that all but sealed a 44–34 win for Buffalo. In Week 10 against the Arizona Cardinals, Klein recorded a team high 10 tackles and sacked Kyler Murray once during the 32–30 loss. In Week 12, following a bye in Week 11, playing at home against the Los Angeles Chargers, Klein recorded another team high in tackles with 14. He also added a sack and three tackles for a loss on rookie Justin Herbert, on the way to a 27–17 Bills victory. Klein was named the AFC Defensive Player of the Week for his performance in Week 12.

Klein was released by the Bills on March 8, 2022, in a cap-clearing move.

=== New York Giants ===
On October 3, 2022, the New York Giants signed Klein to their practice squad.

=== Baltimore Ravens ===
On October 6, 2022, the Baltimore Ravens signed Klein to their active roster off the Giants practice squad.

=== Chicago Bears ===
On October 31, 2022, Klein, a 2023 second round pick, and a 2023 fifth round pick were traded to the Chicago Bears for Roquan Smith. Klein was waived by the Bears on November 16, 2022.

=== Buffalo Bills (second stint) ===
On November 17, 2022, Klein was claimed off waivers by the Bills. In the 2022 season, he made his only start, and made nine tackles and broke up a pass, in the Thanksgiving Day game against the Detroit Lions.

Klein re-signed with the Bills on April 17, 2023, for a one-year contract with a base salary of $1.165 million. In July 2023 he told The Buffalo News, “This is the one place I knew I could come to and win the Super Bowl and be around quality people and quality teammates. If this is the end of my journey as far as football goes, I want it to be here in Buffalo.”

He was released on August 29, 2023, and re-signed to the practice squad on September 21. He was promoted to the active roster on October 11. He was released on December 9. Klein was re-signed to the practice squad on January 11, 2024. With Tyrel Dodson injured, Klein was elevated to the team on January 14, for the January 15 game against the Pittsburgh Steelers. The Bills won 31-17 and he led the team in tackles with 11. Before he was called up, he had bought an RV and was planning a road trip to Key West, Florida, for the weekend. He was not signed to a reserve/future contract after the season and thus became a free agent when his practice squad contract expired.

=== Retirement ===
On July 30, 2024, Klein announced his retirement.

== NFL career statistics ==
Legend
**Bold**	Career high

=== Regular season ===
Year	Team	Games		Tackles							Interceptions						Fumbles				
Year	Team	GP	GS	Cmb	Solo	Ast	TFL	QBH	Sck	Sfty	PD	Int	Yds	Y/I	Lng	TD	FF	FR	Yds	Y/R	TD
2013	CAR	**16**	2	21	18	3	5	2	2.0	0	0	0	0	—	0	0	0	0	0	—	0
2014	CAR	14	8	39	25	14	2	0	0.0	0	0	0	0	—	0	0	1	0	0	—	0
2015	CAR	15	6	55	39	16	**7**	2	1.0	0	1	**1**	8	8.0	8	0	1	0	0	—	0
2016	CAR	15	7	31	17	14	2	1	1.0	0	1	0	0	—	0	0	**2**	0	0	—	0
2017	NO	12	12	54	37	17	6	3	2.0	0	4	0	0	—	0	0	1	0	0	—	0
2018	NO	**16**	**15**	70	42	**28**	**7**	4	2.0	0	3	**1**	6	6.0	6	0	0	**2**	**17**	**8.5**	0
2019	NO	15	**15**	69	47	22	5	5	2.5	0	2	**1**	**14**	**14.0**	**14**	**1**	1	0	0	—	0
2020	BUF	**16**	11	**75**	**53**	22	5	**9**	**5.0**	0	4	0	0	—	0	0	**2**	1	0	0.0	0
2021	BUF	15	4	35	29	6	4	1	0.0	0	**5**	**1**	12	12.0	12	0	0	1	0	0.0	0
2022	BAL	2	1	5	4	1	1	0	0.0	0	0	0	0	—	0	0	0	0	0	—	0
2022	CHI	2	0	0	0	0	0	0	0.0	0	0	0	0	—	0	0	0	0	0	—	0
2022	BUF	6	1	11	7	4	1	0	0.0	0	0	0	0	—	0	0	0	0	0	—	0
Career		144	82	465	318	147	45	27	15.5	0	20	4	40	10.0	14	1	8	4	17	4.3	0

=== Postseason ===
Year	Team	Games		Tackles						
Year	Team	GP	GS	Cmb	Solo	Ast	TFL	QBH	Sck	Sfty
2013	CAR	1	0	0	0	0	0	0	0.0	0
2014	CAR	Did not play due to injury								
2015	CAR	**3**	0	2	0	2	0	0	0.0	0
2017	NO	Did not play due to injury								
2018	NO	2	**1**	7	**5**	2	**2**	0	0.0	0
2019	NO	1	**1**	**8**	4	**4**	1	0	0.0	0
2020	BUF	**3**	**1**	3	2	1	0	0	0.0	0
2021	BUF	2	0	4	1	3	0	0	0.0	0
2022	BUF	2	0	0	0	0	0	0	0.0	0
Career		14	3	24	12	12	3	0	0.0	0

== Personal life ==
Klein is a Christian. Klein and his wife, Taylor, have a son, Cannon James, whom they adopted in 2019, and a daughter, Bowie Rose, also born in 2019. Klein and his wife, Taylor, have their newest son born March 2024- Noble Banks Klein.
