= Justin Hardee =

American football player (born 1994)

Profile
- Position: Cornerback / Special teamer

Personal information
- Born: February 7, 1994 (age 32); Cleveland, Ohio, U.S.
- Listed height: 6 ft 1 in (1.85 m)
- Listed weight: 200 lb (91 kg)

Career information
- High school: Glenville (Cleveland, Ohio)
- College: Illinois (2012–2016)
- NFL draft: 2017: undrafted

Career history
- Houston Texans (2017)*; New Orleans Saints (2017–2020); New York Jets (2021–2023); Cleveland Browns (2024)*; Carolina Panthers (2024)*; Tennessee Titans (2024)
- * Offseason or practice squad member only

Awards and highlights
- Pro Bowl (2022)

Career NFL statistics as of 2024
- Total tackles: 81
- Pass deflections: 2
- Interceptions: 1
- Forced fumbles: 1
- Defensive touchdowns: 1
- Stats at Pro Football Reference

Justin Hardee Sr. (born February 7, 1994) is an American professional football cornerback and special teamer. He played college football for the Illinois Fighting Illini and was signed as an undrafted free agent by the Houston Texans in 2017. Hardee has also played for the New Orleans Saints, New York Jets, Cleveland Browns, Carolina Panthers and the Tennessee Titans.

== College career ==
Hardee committed to Illinois as a three-star prospect out of Cleveland, Ohio where he racked up a total of 841 yards receiving throughout his entire career.

=== Statistics ===
Season	GP	Receiving			
Season	GP	Rec	Yds	Avg	TD
2012	12	17	192	11.3	0
2013	9	11	95	8.6	0
2014	9	19	240	12.6	1
2016	10	25	314	12.6	0
Career	38	72	841	11.7	1

== Professional career ==
Pre-draft measurables
Height	Weight	Arm length	Hand span	40-yard dash	10-yard split	20-yard split	20-yard shuttle	Three-cone drill	Vertical jump	Broad jump	Bench press
6 ft 0 5/8 in (1.84 m)	197 lb (89 kg)	32 1/4 in (0.82 m)	9 1/2 in (0.24 m)	4.36 s	1.50 s	2.56 s	4.26 s	7.28 s	34.5 in (0.88 m)	10 ft 9 in (3.28 m)	17 reps
All values from Pro Day

=== Houston Texans ===
Hardee was signed by the Houston Texans as an undrafted free agent on May 12, 2017. He was waived on September 2.

=== New Orleans Saints ===
On September 7, 2017, Hardee was signed to the practice squad of the New Orleans Saints. He was promoted to the active roster on September 23. In Week 9 against the Tampa Bay Buccaneers, Hardee blocked a punt by Bryan Anger and returned it for a touchdown in a 30–10 win. He was recognized as the National Football Conference Special Teams Player of the Week for his accomplishment.

Hardee finished the season making 10 combined tackles in 14 regular-season games and 2 post-season games.

==== 2018 ====
In Week 4 against the New York Giants, in the first quarter on a fourth down, quarterback Taysom Hill threw a 10 yard pass to Hardee, where he made his first NFL career reception. This gave his team a first down in a drive ending in a field goal, in a Saints win. In Week 5, against the Washington Redskins, Hardee caught his first NFL career interception, a short pass thrown by quarterback Alex Smith that was returned for 77 yards. This play ended at Washington's 4-yard line, setting up a quick drive for a Saints touchdown. He also made 2 pass deflections in the Saints' 43-19 win.

He finished the season playing in all 16 regular-season games and 2 post-season games, making 20 combined tackles, 1 reception, 2 passes deflected and 1 interception.

==== 2019 ====
Hardee played in all 16 regular-season games and the Saints' single postseason game, making a combined 11 tackles.

==== 2020 ====
On March 23, 2020, Hardee re-signed with the Saints. He was placed on injured reserve on November 6 with a groin injury. He was activated on December 12. He finished the season participating in 10 regular-season games and 2 post-season games, making 8 combined tackles.

=== New York Jets ===
==== 2021 ====
Hardee signed a three-year, $5.25 million contract with the New York Jets on March 18, 2021. He played in 16 regular-season games, making 12 combined tackles.

==== 2022 ====
In Week 4, against the Pittsburgh Steelers, Hardee forced a fumble on return specialist Gunner Olszewski in a Steelers' punt return at the start of the third quarter, which was recovered by James Pierre. The Jets went on to win that game 24–20. He finished the season with 14 combined tackles and 1 forced fumble within 17 regular-season games. Hardee was awarded his first Pro Bowl and NFLPA All-Pro selections for the special teams position after his performance during the 2022 season.

==== 2023 ====
On October 14, 2023, Hardee was placed on injured reserve with a hamstring injury. He was activated on December 2. Hardee played 11 games during the 2023 season, making five total tackles on special teams.

=== Cleveland Browns ===
On April 2, 2024, Hardee signed with the Cleveland Browns. He was released on August 27, and re-signed to the practice squad. He was released on September 10.

=== Carolina Panthers ===
On September 24, 2024, Hardee signed with the Carolina Panthers practice squad. He was released on October 4.

=== Tennessee Titans ===
On October 29, 2024, Hardee was signed to the Tennessee Titans' practice squad. He was promoted to the active roster on November 2. He played nine games with the Titans, making three tackles on special teams.

On April 1, 2025, Hardee re-signed with the Titans on a one-year contract. He was released on April 18.
