= Damian Swann =

American football player (born 1992)

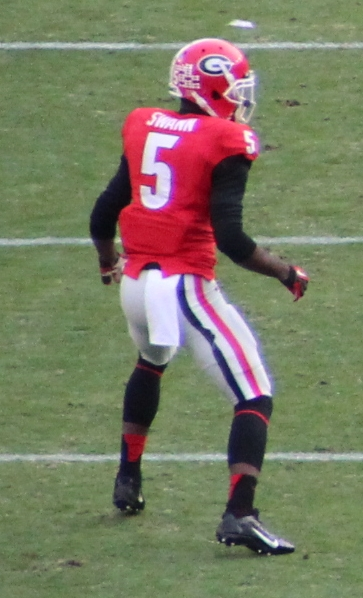
- Swann with the Georgia Bulldogs in 2013

No. 27
- Position: Cornerback

Personal information
- Born: December 4, 1992 (age 33); Atlanta, Georgia, U.S.
- Listed height: 6 ft 0 in (1.83 m)
- Listed weight: 180 lb (82 kg)

Career information
- High school: Grady (Atlanta)
- College: Georgia
- NFL draft: 2015: 5th round, 167th overall pick

Career history
- New Orleans Saints (2015–2016); Atlanta Legends (2019); Winnipeg Blue Bombers (2020)*
- * Offseason or practice squad member only

Awards and highlights
- Second-team All-SEC (2014)

Career NFL statistics
- Total tackles: 22
- Pass deflections: 4
- Stats at Pro Football Reference

Damian Rashad Swann (born December 4, 1992) is an American former professional football player who was a cornerback in the National Football League (NFL). He played college football for the Georgia Bulldogs.

== Early life ==
Swann was born in Atlanta, Georgia. He came from a rough background, but still played football, as well as playing baseball and basketball. He attended Henry W. Grady High School in Atlanta. He was heavily recruited by colleges and became the first person in his family to attend college once recruited by Georgia.

== College career ==
Swann played for the Georgia Bulldogs from 2011 to 2014. He earned Associated Press Second-team All-Southeastern Conference (SEC) honors his senior season.

== Professional career ==
=== New Orleans Saints ===
Swann was selected by the New Orleans Saints in the fifth round of the 2015 NFL draft with the 167th overall pick. He signed a four-year contract with the Saints on May 11, 2015. He played in seven games, starting two, for the team during the 2015 season. He suffered three concussions in a span of nine weeks and was placed on the injured reserve list with three weeks to go in the season. He returned to the team for training camp in 2016, but on August 31, 2016, it was reported that the Saints had again placed him on injured reserve, ending his season.

On September 2, 2017, Swann was waived by the Saints.

=== Atlanta Legends ===
In January 2019, Swann joined the Atlanta Legends of the Alliance of American Football. The league ceased operations in April 2019.

=== Winnipeg Blue Bombers ===
Swann signed with the Winnipeg Blue Bombers of the Canadian Football League on March 17, 2020. However, the 2020 season was later cancelled due to the COVID-19 pandemic in Canada. He was released on June 18, 2021.
