= De'Vante Harris =

American football player (born 1994)

No. 21, 22
- Position: Cornerback

Personal information
- Born: June 30, 1994 (age 32); Mesquite, Texas, U.S.
- Listed height: 5 ft 11 in (1.80 m)
- Listed weight: 190 lb (86 kg)

Career information
- High school: John Horn (Mesquite)
- College: Texas A&M
- NFL draft: 2016: undrafted

Career history
- New Orleans Saints (2016–2017); Tampa Bay Buccaneers (2018)

Career NFL statistics
- Total tackles: 40
- Fumble recoveries: 1
- Pass deflections: 6
- Stats at Pro Football Reference

De'Vante Harris (born June 30, 1994) is an American former professional football player who was a cornerback in the National Football League (NFL). He played college football for the Texas A&M Aggies. Harris was signed by the New Orleans Saints as an undrafted free agent in 2016.

== College career ==
Harris attended and played college football at Texas A&M University from 2012 to 2015.

== Professional career ==
External videos
- Harris' NFL Combine workout

Pre-draft measurables
Height	Weight	Arm length	Hand span	40-yard dash	10-yard split	20-yard split	20-yard shuttle	Three-cone drill	Vertical jump	Broad jump	Bench press
5 ft 10 5/8 in (1.79 m)	176 lb (80 kg)	30 5/8 in (0.78 m)	8 1/8 in (0.21 m)	4.56 s	1.60 s	2.65 s	4.06 s	6.82 s	38.5 in (0.98 m)	10 ft 4 in (3.15 m)	5 reps
All values are from NFL Combine, except bench press from Pro Day

=== New Orleans Saints ===
After going undrafted in the 2016 NFL draft, Harris signed with the New Orleans Saints on May 2, 2016.

On December 2, 2017, Harris was waived by the Saints and re-signed to the practice squad. He signed a reserve/future contract with the Saints on January 16, 2018. Harris was waived by the Saints on August 11.

=== Tampa Bay Buccaneers ===
On August 12, 2018, Harris was claimed off waivers by the Tampa Bay Buccaneers. He was placed on injured reserve on September 8, with a hamstring injury. On September 11, Harris was waived by the Buccaneers with an injury settlement. On October 23, Harris was re-signed by the Buccaneers.

On March 15, 2019, Harris was re-signed by the Buccaneers. He was waived during final roster cuts on August 30.

== Personal life ==
His father Rod Harris, played wide receiver in the NFL and the CFL.
