= 2009 NFC Championship Game =

2010 American football postseason game

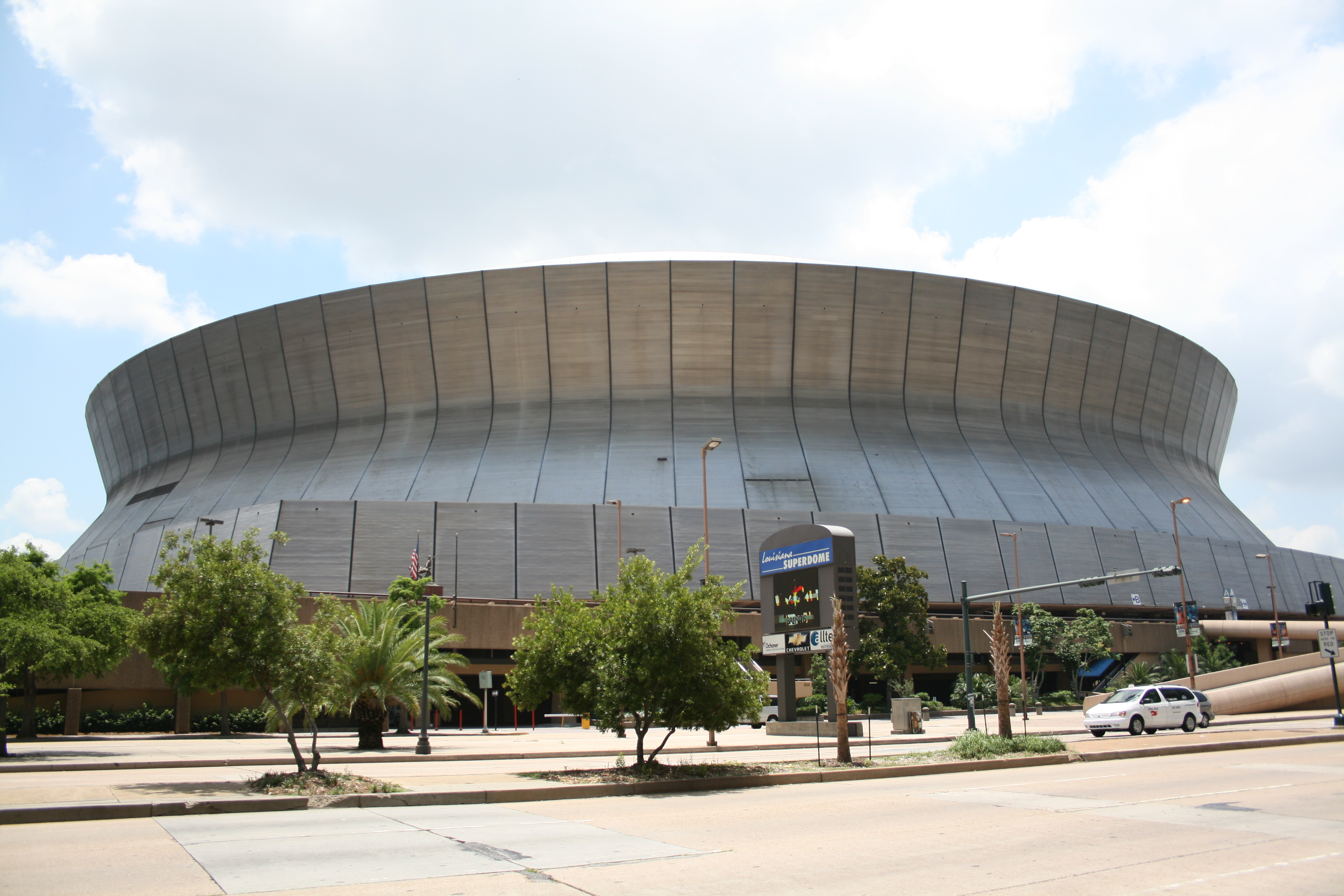
- The Louisiana Superdome in New Orleans, the site of the game
Minnesota Vikings (2) (12–4)	New Orleans Saints (1) (13–3)
28	31
Head coach: Brad Childress	Head coach: Sean Payton
	1	2	3	4	OT	Total
MIN	14	0	7	7	0	28
NO	7	7	7	7	3	31
- Date: January 24, 2010
- Kickoff time: 5:40 p.m. CST
- Stadium: Louisiana Superdome; New Orleans, Louisiana, U.S.
- Favorite: Saints by 3.5
- Referee: Pete Morelli
- Attendance: 71,276

TV in the United States
- Network: Fox
- Announcers: Joe Buck, Troy Aikman, Pam Oliver, and Chris Myers
- Nielsen ratings: U.S. TV viewership: 57.9 million

The 2009 National Football Conference (NFC) Championship Game was a National Football League (NFL) game played on January 24, 2010, to determine the NFC champion for the 2009 NFL season. The game was played at the Louisiana Superdome in New Orleans, Louisiana, and featured the Minnesota Vikings against the New Orleans Saints.

In a highly-anticipated game featuring future Hall of Fame quarterbacks Drew Brees and Brett Favre, the Saints narrowly defeated the Vikings, 31–28, in overtime, advancing to the Super Bowl for the first time in franchise history.

The game came into focus in following years due to the emergence of the Bountygate scandal and the controversial hits that Saints players delivered on Favre and other Vikings players.

== Background ==
The Minnesota Vikings entered the 2009 season coming off a 10–6 campaign in 2008 that saw the team win the NFC North. However, expectations were raised coming into the 2009 season as the team signed quarterback Brett Favre out of retirement. Under Favre, the Vikings went 12–4 on the season, repeated as NFC North champions, and earned a first-round bye. In the divisional round, the Vikings defeated the Dallas Cowboys, 34–3, to advance to their first NFC Championship Game since 2000.

The New Orleans Saints entered the 2009 season seeking to return to the playoffs after a 7–9 season in 2007 and 8–8 season in 2008. The Saints began the season 13–0 and finished 13–3, all while clinching the top seed in the NFC playoffs. Quarterback Drew Brees finished as runner-up in AP NFL MVP voting.

== Game summary ==
=== First half ===
The Vikings scored on the opening drive of the game as Adrian Peterson ran it into the end zone from 19 yards out. The Saints responded on the next drive, when Drew Brees threw a 38-yard touchdown pass to halfback Pierre Thomas that tied the game. Aided by three Saints penalties, the Vikings scored on their subsequent drive as Favre threw a touchdown pass to Sidney Rice and took a 14–7 lead.

New Orleans tied the game on their first drive of the second quarter with Brees' 9-yard touchdown pass to Devery Henderson. Later on, the Vikings got a scoring opportunity when New Orleans running back Reggie Bush muffed a punt that Minnesota's Kenny Onatolu recovered on the Saints 10-yard line. But two plays after that, the Vikings lost the ball themselves on a fumbled handoff from Favre to Peterson that was recovered by linebacker Scott Fujita with less than a minute left in the half.

=== Second half ===
The Saints' started the second half with a scoring drive that only took 2:04, set up by a 61-yard kickoff return from Courtney Roby. Thomas scored his second touchdown of the game on a 9-yard run and gave New Orleans their first lead of the game. Favre responded by leading the Vikings right back down the field, completing three passes to tight end Visanthe Shiancoe for 67 yards on an 80-yard drive that ended with Peterson scoring for the second time on a 1-yard touchdown run. After a Saints punt, Minnesota drove to the New Orleans 33-yard line, where Saints linebacker Jonathan Vilma ended the drive by intercepting a pass intended for Rice. The Vikings defense managed to force another punt, but once again they turned the ball over as Saints defensive lineman Will Smith forced a fumble from Percy Harvin that Remi Ayodele recovered and returned to the Vikings 7-yard line.

Following the turnover, New Orleans regained the lead early in the fourth quarter, as Brees threw his third touchdown pass of the game, this one a 5-yard toss to Bush, which was initially ruled down at the 1-yard line but changed to a touchdown after a Saints replay challenge. The Vikings responded with a drive inside the Saints 20-yard line, featuring a 27-yard run by Peterson and a 30-yard reception by Bernard Berrian, but once again the Saints defense forced a turnover, this time on a fumble by Berrian that was knocked free by defensive back Tracy Porter and recovered by Vilma. However, the Vikings defense quickly forced a punt, getting the ball back for the offense with great field position at the Minnesota 43-yard line. After a 16-yard reception by Shiancoe and an 18-yard run by Peterson, an 18-yard pass interference penalty on Porter moved the ball to the Saints 1-yard line. Peterson scored his third touchdown on the next play, tying the score with just over eight minutes left in the game.

After forcing a punt, the Vikings got the ball back with 2:42 left and drove to the Saints 33-yard line, within range of a potential game-winning field goal by kicker Ryan Longwell. However, on the next two plays, Peterson and running back Chester Taylor were both tackled for no gain. Then, after calling a timeout with 19 seconds left, Minnesota was flagged for having 12 men in the huddle and penalized five yards, bringing up third down and 15 from the 38. On the next play, the Vikings decided to pass in an attempt to move the ball into better field goal range, but Porter intercepted a desperate throw from Favre, ending the drive and sending the game into overtime. This was the second NFC Championship Game to require overtime in three seasons, the first being the 2007 game.

The Saints won the coin toss in overtime and never gave up the ball. Thomas returned Longwell's kickoff 40 yards to the New Orleans 39, and the team gained 39 additional yards on 10 plays, including a fourth down conversion leap attempt by Thomas. The Saints were aided by a defensive holding penalty by cornerback Asher Allen and a pass interference penalty called against linebacker Ben Leber. Brees threw to Robert Meachem at the 23-yard line, controversially ruled a catch on the field and upheld by the booth, despite replays appearing to show the ball being moved by contact with the ground as Meachem attempted to gather it. This is where the drive stalled; Hartley was called on to try the first field goal of the game and connected from 40 yards out, sending the Saints to their first Super Bowl in the franchise's 43-year history.

Four records were set in the game, three by Favre. He broke the career postseason pass attempts and passing yards records, but also set the record for most career postseason interceptions following his two picks in this game. It was the second time in three years that an interception thrown by Favre had helped to cost his team a conference championship, with his interception in overtime against the New York Giants in 2008 leading to a field goal that eliminated the Green Bay Packers. The Vikings outgained the Saints 475–257, which was the biggest yardage differential for a losing team in NFL postseason history, though the Saints forced five turnovers (three fumbles and two interceptions). With his game winning kick, Hartley joined Rich Karlis, Morten Andersen and Lawrence Tynes as the only four players in NFL history to score the winning points in a conference championship game decided in overtime. All four games were decided by field goals, with Hartley becoming the first to win an overtime game for the home team (in all three previous games, the home team was defeated). The two teams had nine fumbles between them in the game, with Peterson and Brees leading all players with two each. Minnesota fumbled six times and lost three of them. Peterson finished with 25 carries for 122 yards and three touchdowns, along with 2 receptions for 14 yards.

== Box score ==
Minnesota Vikings vs. New Orleans Saints – Game summary

Quarter	1	2	3	4	OT	Total
Vikings	14	0	7	7	0	28
Saints	7	7	7	7	3	31

at Louisiana Superdome, New Orleans, Louisiana

- Game time: 6:40 p.m. EST/5:40 p.m. CST
- Game weather: None (indoor stadium)
- Game attendance: 71,276
- Referee: Pete Morelli (135)
- TV announcers (Fox): Joe Buck (play-by-play), Troy Aikman (color commentator), Pam Oliver and Chris Myers (sideline reporters)
- Recap, Game Book

Game information

First quarter

- MIN – Adrian Peterson 19-yard run (Ryan Longwell kick), 9:35. Vikings 7–0. Drive: 10 plays, 80 yards, 5:25.
- NO – Pierre Thomas 38-yard pass from Drew Brees (Garrett Hartley kick), 6:30. Tied 7–7. Drive: 7 plays, 76 yards, 3:05.
- MIN – Sidney Rice 5-yard pass from Brett Favre (Ryan Longwell kick), 2:11. Vikings 14–7. Drive: 10 plays, 73 yards, 4:19.

Second quarter

- NO – Devery Henderson 9-yard pass from Drew Brees (Garrett Hartley kick), 10:30. Tied 14–14. Drive: 7 plays, 64 yards, 2:51.

Third quarter

- NO – Pierre Thomas 9-yard run (Garrett Hartley kick), 12:56. Saints 21–14. Drive: 4 plays, 37 yards, 2:04.
- MIN – Adrian Peterson 1-yard run (Ryan Longwell kick), 7:35. Tied 21–21. Drive: 9 plays, 80 yards, 5:21.

Fourth quarter

- NO – Reggie Bush 5-yard pass from Drew Brees (Garrett Hartley kick), 12:39. Saints 28–21. Drive: 3 plays, 7 yards, 1:31.
- MIN – Adrian Peterson 2-yard run (Ryan Longwell kick), 4:58. Tied 28–28. Drive: 7 plays, 57 yards, 2:59.

Overtime

- NO – Garrett Hartley 40-yard field goal, 10:15. Saints 31–28. Drive: 10 plays, 39 yards, 4:45.

Top passers

- MIN – Brett Favre – 28/46, 310 yards, TD
- NO – Drew Brees – 17/31, 197 yards, 3 TD

Top rushers

- MIN – Adrian Peterson – 25 rushes, 122 yards, 3 TD
- NO – Pierre Thomas – 14 rushes, 61 yards

Top receivers

- MIN – Bernard Berrian – 9 receptions, 102 yards
- NO – Devery Henderson – 4 receptions, 39 yards, TD

== Aftermath and legacy ==
The Saints advanced to Super Bowl XLIV and defeated the Indianapolis Colts, 31–17, to win their first Super Bowl championship in franchise history.

For the second time in 11 seasons, the Vikings were defeated by a field goal in a conference championship game, as they had lost by the same differential to the Atlanta Falcons in the 1998 NFC Championship Game. Despite retaining much of their core, Minnesota regressed in the following season, as Brett Favre experienced a considerable decline in performance and other key injuries impacted the team. Favre retired after the 2010 season, making this the final playoff game of his 20-season career.

Vikings' radio play-by-play announcer Paul Allen later became viral for his call that criticized Favre after his late-game interception:

"You've gotta be kidding me, I can't believe what I just saw.....why do you even ponder passing, I mean you can take a knee, and try a 56-yard field goal! This is not Detroit man, this is the Super Bowl!"

Allen was both criticized and praised by Vikings fans for "ripping into" Favre, while Allen stressed afterward that he was not criticizing him. He was not admonished for the call as management "knew what I was saying was from the heart."

=== Bountygate ===
In 2012, the NFL found evidence that the Saints implemented a bounty system for defensive players to injure opposing quarterbacks or other key offensive players from the 2009 to 2012 seasons. The 2009 NFC Championship Game became a focal point of the scandal, as the game featured several controversial hits by Saints players on Vikings' quarterback Brett Favre that many questioned the legality of. Specific evidence from the NFL's investigation found that Saints players had pledged a total of $35,000 to any player who was able to injure Favre to the extent that he could no longer play in the game.

== See also ==
- 2009 AFC Championship Game
- 2009–10 NFL playoffs
- Saints–Vikings rivalry
