= Minneapolis Miracle =

2018 American football playoff game

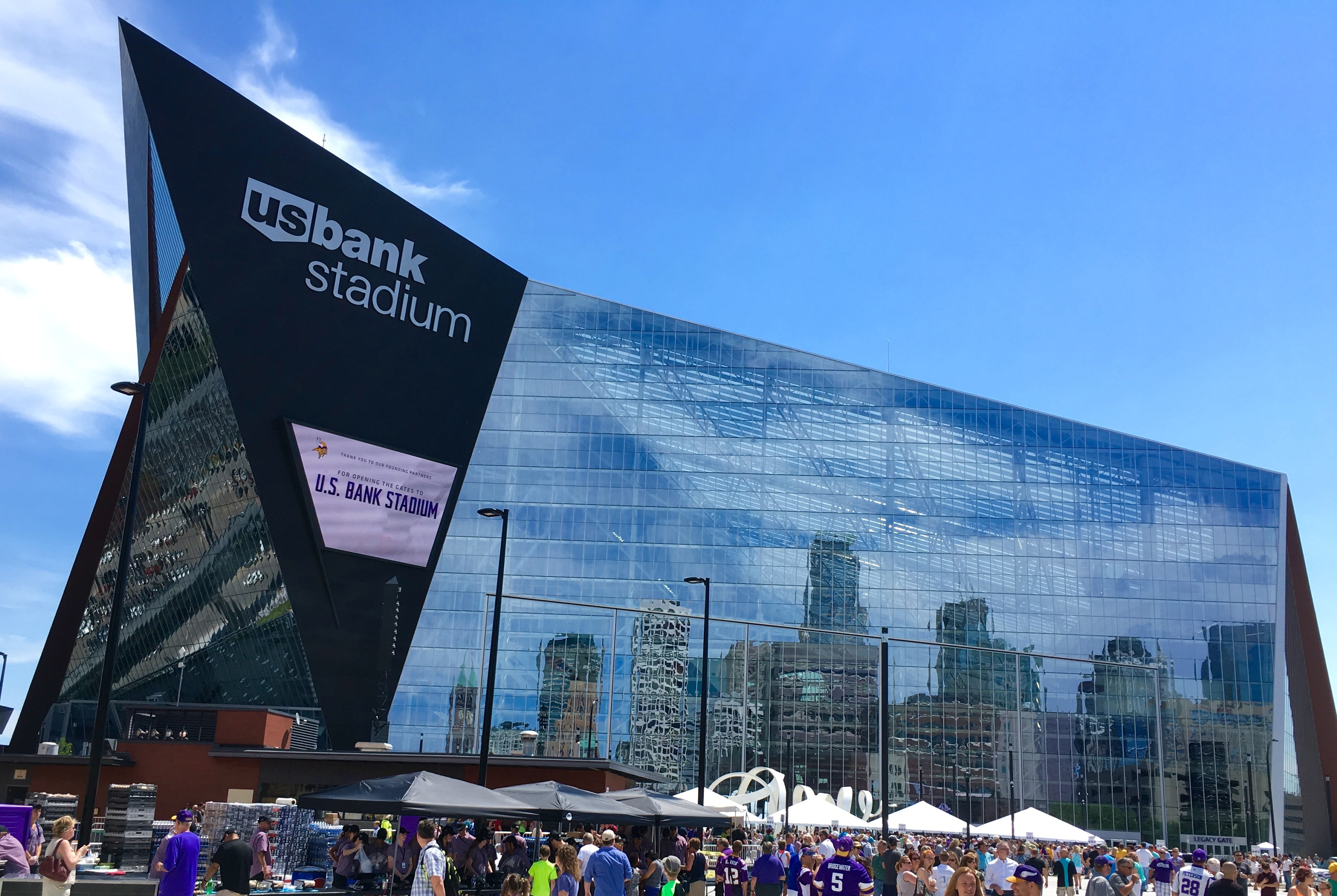
- U.S. Bank Stadium, the site of the game.
New Orleans Saints (4) (11–5)	Minnesota Vikings (2) (13–3)
24	29
Head coach: Sean Payton	Head coach: Mike Zimmer
	1	2	3	4	Total
NO	0	0	7	17	24
MIN	10	7	0	12	29
- Date: January 14, 2018
- Stadium: U.S. Bank Stadium; Minneapolis, Minnesota
- Favorite: Vikings by 5.5
- Referee: Gene Steratore
- Attendance: 66,612

TV in the United States
- Network: Fox
- Announcers: Joe Buck, Troy Aikman, Erin Andrews and Chris Myers

Radio in the United States
- Network: KFXN-FM
- Announcers: Paul Allen and Pete Bercich

The Minneapolis Miracle (also known as the Minnesota Miracle) was the final play of a NFC divisional playoff game played between the Minnesota Vikings and the New Orleans Saints at U.S. Bank Stadium in Minneapolis, Minnesota on January 14, 2018, when Vikings wide receiver Stefon Diggs caught a game-winning touchdown.

The Saints came back from a 17–0 first-half deficit and established a 24–23 lead with 25 seconds remaining in the game. On the last play of the game, Vikings quarterback Case Keenum threw a 27-yard pass to wide receiver Stefon Diggs; Saints safety Marcus Williams missed a tackle, allowing Diggs to run to the end zone to complete the 61-yard touchdown pass. This game was the first in NFL playoffs history to end in a touchdown as time expired.

In the aftermath, Keenum and Diggs were lauded for their efforts on the game-winning score, while Williams received criticism for his missed tackle. The Vikings' radio call by Paul Allen – who described the play as a "Minneapolis Miracle" – was circulated widely on the internet and in mainstream media and it became the popular appellation for both the play and the game itself. The play won multiple end-of-year awards and prompted a change to the NFL's rules.

== Background ==
The previous playoff meeting between the two teams was the 2009 NFC Championship game, which was notable for the excessive roughness of the Saints, later termed "Bountygate", as well as the Vikings driving close to a game-winning field goal before quarterback Brett Favre threw an interception. Some Minneapolis sportswriters later described the "Miracle" as atoning for Bountygate.

Prior to the 2016 season, Minnesota's starting quarterback Teddy Bridgewater suffered a non-contact injury that produced a dislocated knee, torn ACL and "other structural damage". The severity of the injury nearly cost Bridgewater his leg and compelled the Vikings to trade two draft picks to the Philadelphia Eagles for Sam Bradford as a replacement. The Vikings began 2016 with a 5–0 record before collapsing to finish 8–8.

The Saints, for their part, produced their third consecutive 7–9 showing in 2016, leading to rumors that they might fire or trade head coach Sean Payton during the offseason. Despite the speculation to the contrary, Payton retained his position as the Saints' head coach for 2017, although five assistant coaches lost their jobs.

Minnesota entered the 2017 campaign with Bradford as its starting quarterback, as Bridgewater was still recovering from his knee injury. Bradford suffered a knee injury of his own in a Week 1 game against the Saints, resulting in Case Keenum taking over at the quarterback position. Keenum subsequently led the Vikings to a 13–3 regular season record and the NFC North title for just the second time since 2009. Three Vikings scored eight touchdowns: running back Latavius Murray, wide receiver Stefon Diggs, and tight end Kyle Rudolph. Since the Vikings were the #2 seed in the NFC, they did not have to play during the NFL's Wild Card Weekend. The Vikings' #2 seeding meant that U.S. Bank Stadium became the first Super Bowl host stadium (selected on May 20, 2014) to also host a Divisional Playoff Game in the same season; all previous times that the Super Bowl host stadium also hosted another postseason game that season were Wild Card Playoffs.

Despite an 0–2 start to 2017, New Orleans finished with an 11–5 record, thereby winning the NFC South and qualifying for the playoffs as the #4 seed. New Orleans' rookie running back Alvin Kamara won the NFL Offensive Rookie of the Year award after earning 6.1 yards-per-carry and scoring 14 total touchdowns during the regular season. Veteran running back Mark Ingram also scored double-digit touchdowns (12), while second-year wide receiver Michael Thomas caught 104 passes for 1,245 yards and five touchdowns. In their Wild Card Weekend match-up against the Carolina Panthers, the Saints won, 31–26.

The two teams had already met once before during the 2017 season. In Week 1 at U.S. Bank Stadium, the Vikings beat the Saints, 29–19. The spread for the playoff match-up opened with the Vikings favored by 3.5 points. By game time, the betting line had risen to 5.5 points.

== Game summary ==
2017 NFC Divisional Playoffs: (4) New Orleans Saints at (2) Minnesota Vikings – Game summary

Quarter	1	2	3	4	Total
Saints	0	0	7	17	24
Vikings	10	7	0	12	29

at U.S. Bank Stadium, Minneapolis, Minnesota

- Date: January 14
- Game time: 3:40 p.m. CST
- Game weather: None (indoor stadium)
- Game attendance: 66,612
- Referee: Gene Steratore
- TV announcers (Fox): Joe Buck, Troy Aikman, Erin Andrews and Chris Myers
- Recap, Game Book

Game information

First quarter

- MIN – Jerick McKinnon 14-yard run (Kai Forbath kick), 9:45. Vikings 7–0. Drive: 8 plays, 55 yards, 4:15.
- MIN – Kai Forbath 20-yard field goal, 4:42. Vikings 10–0. Drive: 7 plays, 79 yards, 2:27.

Second quarter

- MIN – Latavius Murray 1-yard run (Kai Forbath kick), 9:58. Vikings 17–0. Drive: 12 plays, 58 yards, 6:08.

Third quarter

- NO – Michael Thomas 14-yard pass from Drew Brees (Wil Lutz kick), 1:18. Vikings 17–7. Drive: 12 plays, 80 yards, 6:40.

Fourth quarter

- NO – Michael Thomas 3-yard pass from Drew Brees (Wil Lutz kick), 13:09. Vikings 17–14. Drive: 6 plays, 30 yards, 3:00.
- MIN – Kai Forbath 49-yard field goal, 10:12. Vikings 20–14. Drive: 7 plays, 44 yards, 2:57.
- NO – Alvin Kamara 14-yard pass from Drew Brees (Wil Lutz kick), 3:01. Saints 21–20. Drive: 4 plays, 40 yards, 2:20.
- MIN – Kai Forbath 53-yard field goal, 1:29. Vikings 23–21. Drive: 9 plays, 40 yards, 1:32.
- NO - Wil Lutz 43-yard field goal, 0:25. Saints 24–23. Drive: 11 plays, 50 yards, 1:04.
- MIN – Stefon Diggs 61-yard pass from Case Keenum (run failed), 0:00. Vikings 29–24. Drive: 4 plays, 75 yards, 0:25.

Top passers

- NO – Drew Brees – 25/40, 294 yards, 3 TD, 2 INT
- MIN – Case Keenum – 25/40, 318 yards, TD, INT

Top rushers

- NO – Alvin Kamara – 11 rushes, 43 yards
- MIN – Latavius Murray – 19 rushes, 50 yards, TD

Top receivers

- NO – Michael Thomas – 7 receptions, 85 yards, 2 TD
- MIN – Stefon Diggs – 6 receptions, 137 yards, TD

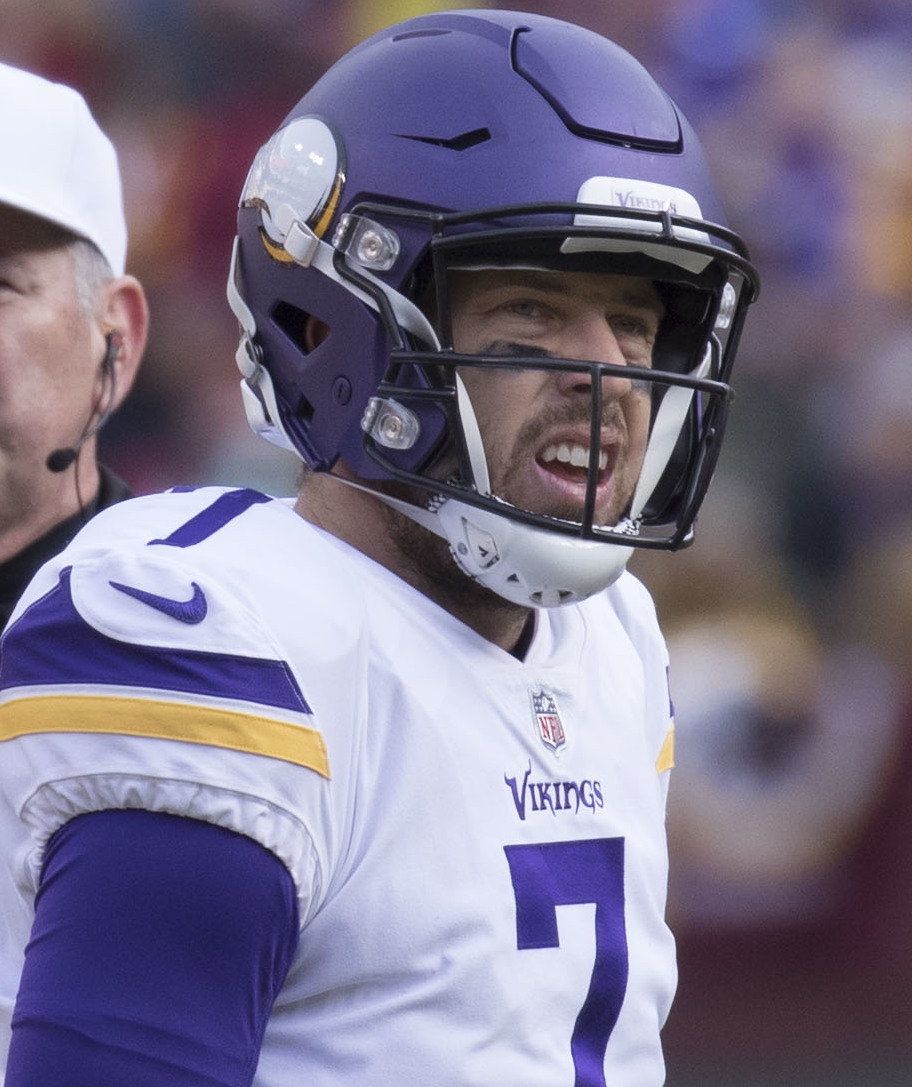
Case Keenum became the starting quarterback of the Vikings after injuries to Teddy Bridgewater and Sam Bradford.

=== First half ===
After holding New Orleans to a three-and-out on the first possession of the game, Minnesota went 55 yards in eight plays and capped off the drive with a 14-yd touchdown run by running back Jerick McKinnon with 9:45 left in the first quarter. Roughly 5 min later in the quarter, a field goal by former Saints kicker Kai Forbath gave the hosts a 10–0 lead. Minnesota added to its lead on the first play of the second quarter on a one-yard score by running back Latavius Murray.

Meanwhile, the New Orleans offense struggled; Saints quarterback Drew Brees threw two interceptions and New Orleans did not complete a single third-down conversion during the first half. Of the Saints' six first-half drives (excluding the end-of-half kneel), two ended with turnovers, three ended with punts, and one ended with a missed 58-yard field goal attempt by kicker Wil Lutz. The Vikings entered halftime with a 17–0 lead. New Orleans had not failed to score in the first half of a game in over three years.

=== Second half ===
After halftime, the Saints' play improved. Minnesota's 11-play drive to start the third quarter stalled 10 yards into New Orleans territory at the 40-yard line, and a touchback by Vikings punter Ryan Quigley gave the Saints the ball starting at their own 20-yard line. A 12-play New Orleans drive culminated with 1:18 remaining in the third quarter, when Brees threw a 14-yard touchdown pass to Michael Thomas to reduce the deficit to 17–7. After Saints safety Marcus Williams intercepted a pass by Case Keenum, Brees threw a three-yard touchdown pass to Thomas with 13:09 remaining in the fourth quarter to bring New Orleans within three. The Vikings responded with a 49-yard field goal by Forbath to increase their lead to 20–14.

Eventually, the Saints blocked a punt attempt from the Vikings that allowed them to take control in Vikings territory. From there, with 3:01 left in the game, the Saints took their first lead of the game, 21–20, on a 14-yard pass from Brees to running back Alvin Kamara on a wheel route. Forbath nailed a 53-yard field goal with 1:29 left in the game to give Minnesota a 23–21 lead. Brees responded by leading the Saints down the field in just 64 seconds, allowing Lutz to make a 43-yard field goal and take a 24–23 lead with 25 seconds remaining. Following the field goal, Saints head coach Sean Payton mocked the Minnesota home crowd by imitating the Vikings fans' "Skol" clap.

After a touchback and a false start by the Vikings, Keenum threw a completed pass to Diggs to their own 39-yard line, then threw two straight incompletions to set up a third-and-10 with 10 seconds remaining in regulation. According to the ESPN win probability model, at this point in time the Vikings had just a 4% chance of winning the game.

== The final play ==
External videos
- Sound FX: Diggs' Walkoff TD

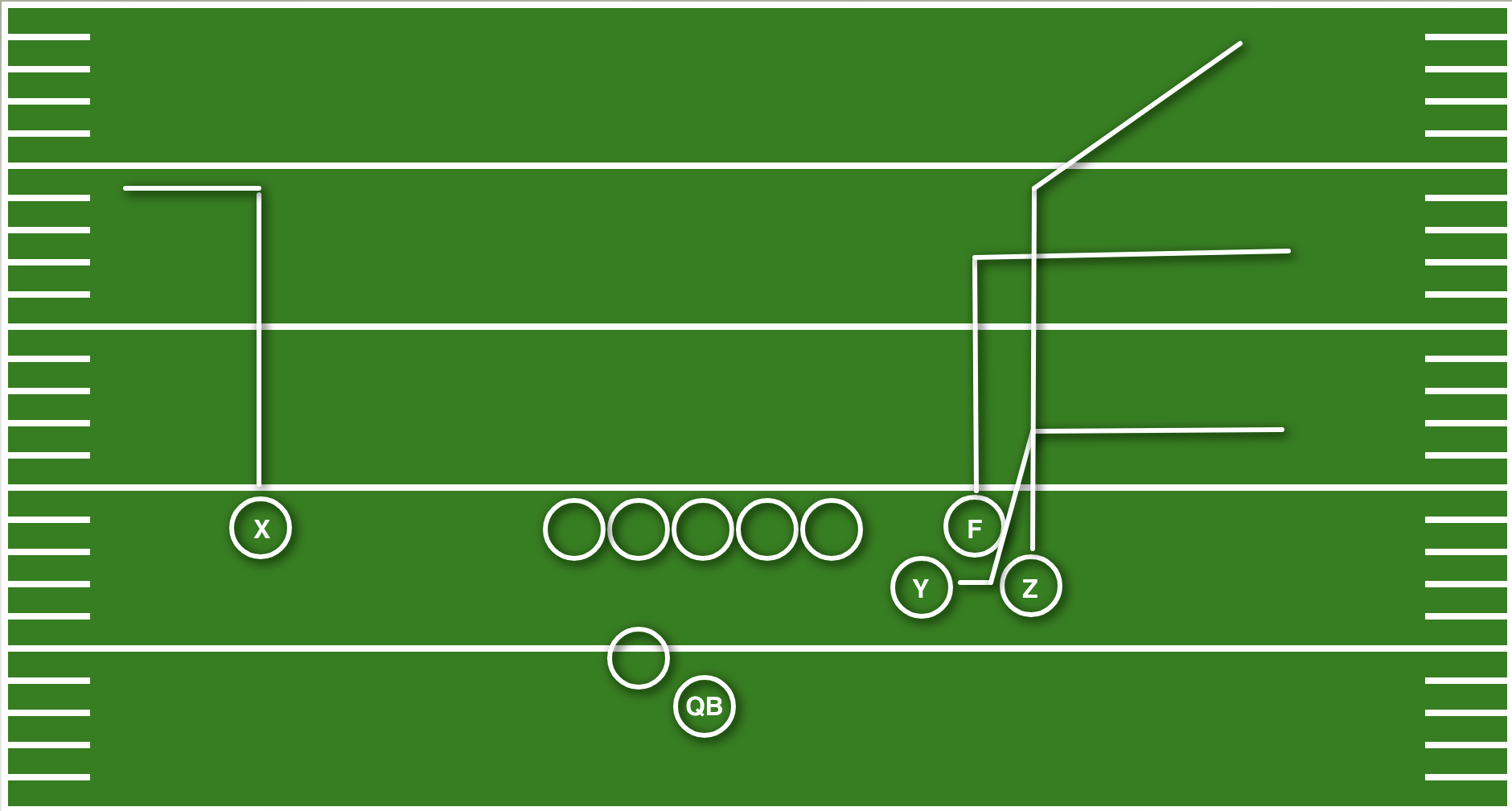
The play design for "Buffalo Right, Seven Heaven", as later explained by quarterback Case Keenum. Per Keenum's designation, wide receiver Stefon Diggs is the "Z" receiver in a bunch set.

With 10 seconds left at their own 39-yard line, the Vikings ran a play titled "Buffalo Right, Seven Heaven". Each word in the play call designated a particular element of the formation or route design. "Buffalo Right" communicated that three receivers were in a bunch ("Buffalo") to the right of center. "Seven" routes are corner routes in which the pass-catchers run towards the sideline. The intent behind the play was to have a receiver catch the ball and then run out of bounds to stop the clock in time for Forbath to kick a field goal. Meanwhile, the Saints set up in an outside zone defense, which is designed to protect the sidelines and keep the offensive players from catching the ball and getting out of bounds.

Keenum took a shotgun snap with running back Jerick McKinnon to his left. Kyle Rudolph, the tight end, ran an out route underneath near the right sideline, while wide receiver Adam Thielen ran a comeback route near the left sideline. Wide receivers Jarius Wright and Stefon Diggs ran corner routes, or "seven" routes, to the right sideline. The offensive line and McKinnon, who was an extra blocker for this play, blocked the four Saints pass rushers. Keenum set his feet and threw a 27-yard pass to Diggs near the right sideline, who caught the ball at the Saints' 34-yard line.

Because Keenum's pass was slightly high, Diggs had to leap in to the air to make the catch. Attempting to make a diving tackle on the airborne Diggs, Saints' free safety Marcus Williams instead dove under the Vikings' receiver and collided with cornerback Ken Crawley, knocking Crawley over and preventing him from having a chance to tackle Diggs. Upon returning to the ground, Diggs stumbled slightly but managed to regain his balance and stay in bounds with no Saints players nearby to tackle him. Although the original intent – and Diggs' first instinct – was for him to catch the ball and run out of bounds to set up a field goal attempt, Diggs, upon seeing that there were no Saints defenders between him and the end zone, immediately turned upfield and sprinted down the sideline for a touchdown as time expired. Accordingly, the game was the first in NFL playoff history to end in regulation with a game-winning touchdown as time expired.

=== Radio and TV media calls ===
In Minnesota, the game was broadcast on KFAN, with Paul Allen and Pete Bercich serving as announcers. As the final play was happening, Allen said, "Are you kidding me?! It's a Minneapolis Miracle! Stefon Diggs! And the Minnesota Vikings have walked off on the New Orleans Saints! It's a 61-yard Minneapolis Miracle!" The call went viral and the term "Minneapolis Miracle" later came to be widely used to refer to the game itself, including by the NFL's official Twitter account minutes after the game ended. Some outlets also used the name "Minnesota Miracle". SB Nation writer Harry Lyles Jr. later characterized Allen's call as the "perfect" radio call for the play. ESPN Brazilian Portuguese-language broadcaster Rômulo Mendonça also used the phrase Milagre em Minneapolis ("The Miracle in Minneapolis") during his live commentary.

Fox had their #1 commentary team calling the game: Joe Buck on play-by-play and Troy Aikman on color commentary.

AIKMAN: Keenum's gonna try to work the ball to the goal.
BUCK: Keenum steps into it. Pass is...caught! DIGGS! Sideline, touchdown! Unbelievable! Vikings win it!

Sports Illustrated writer Jimmy Traina characterized the call as "perfect". When interviewed in 2023, Buck stated that it was "easily the most exciting singular moment that I've ever been a part of".

== Aftermath ==
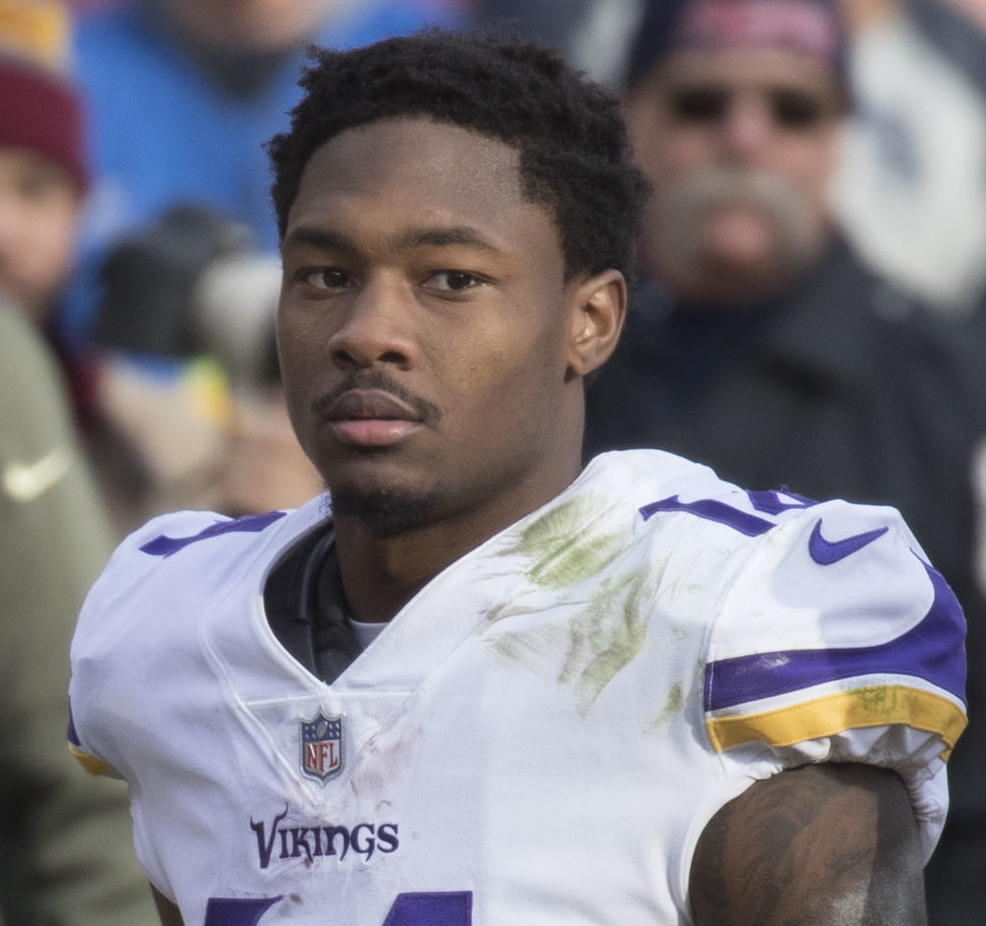
Stefon Diggs, the receiver who caught the touchdown pass that became the Minneapolis Miracle.

Assuming the game was over, broadcast and stadium crew packed the field, and most Saints players left for the locker room. Following a scoring review, both teams returned for the mandated conversion attempt. Only eight players – punter Thomas Morstead, wide receiver Austin Carr, defensive lineman Cameron Jordan, linebackers Manti Te'o and Gerald Hodges, and offensive linemen John Fullington, Josh LeRibeus, and Larry Warford – took the field for the Saints on the final play; only three of them were defensive players. While a 15-yard excessive celebration penalty was to be assessed to Diggs for throwing his helmet, the penalty could only be enforced on a kickoff. Keenum led the stadium in a rendition of the Vikings' "Skol" clap and chant and knelt to end the game on the two-point conversion try. The kneel down also meant that the Vikings did not cover the 5.5-point betting point spread.

The next week, the Vikings traveled to Philadelphia to take on the Philadelphia Eagles in the NFC Championship Game. The Eagles beat the Vikings 38–7, thus denying the Vikings the opportunity to become the first team to play in a Super Bowl in its home stadium. In the days leading up to the NFC Championship, Vikings fans were seen performing the "Skol!" chant around various Philadelphia landmarks, such as the steps of the Philadelphia Museum of Art, where they also adorned the statue of Rocky with Vikings colors. The Eagles went on to win Super Bowl LII in the Vikings' stadium, beating the New England Patriots, 41–33.

On January 15, the Vikings filed for trademarks on the phrases "Minneapolis Miracle" and "Minnesota Miracle" for use on over 100 items, from football helmets to bathing suits. At the 7th NFL Honors, the Minneapolis Miracle won the NFL Play of the Year award.

In March 2018, the NFL instituted a new rule that eliminated the requirement to attempt an extra point or two-point conversion following a game-ending touchdown that gives a team the victory; however, the try must still be attempted if it could affect the game's outcome. For example, if the winning team is ahead by a point or two points before the try, the try must be attempted, as the losing team could potentially garner a turnover during the try and return it for a two-point conversion, thereby tying the score or even winning. The requirement had been in place because an extra-point play can affect a team's points for and against, which at the time were, and still are, used in tiebreakers for playoff seeding. Point differential had been as high as the third tiebreaker in the 1960s and 1970s, and was used to break a tie in the 1971 final standings; however, under the current format, points-related tiebreakers are used as the seventh through tenth tiebreakers and are unlikely to be used. Eliminating the anticlimax and confusion seen at the Minneapolis Miracle game was deemed more important.

In April 2018, it was announced that Diggs' cleats would be displayed in the Pro Football Hall of Fame in Canton, Ohio. The play also won the Best Moment ESPY Award at the 2018 ESPY Awards.

Keenum left the Vikings after the 2017–18 season and signed a two-year, $36 million contract with the Denver Broncos. The other two quarterbacks on the roster, Bradford and Bridgewater, also joined new teams in free agency. Bradford joined the Arizona Cardinals, while Bridgewater signed with the New York Jets before being traded to the Saints to back up Brees. To replace the departed trio, Minnesota signed Kirk Cousins to a fully guaranteed three-year, $84 million contract. Meanwhile, Diggs received a five-year extension from the Vikings for $81 million, but would be traded to the Buffalo Bills in March 2020.

During the 2018 offseason, Payton explained that he was using the play to motivate his players and himself. Payton also expressed regret about calling a draw play for Alvin Kamara on third-and-one on the Saints' final drive. He explained that the failure to convert – and thereby extend the drive – provided the Vikings with the opportunity to get one final possession after Wil Lutz's field goal. Had they gotten the first down, the Saints could have run down the clock to the point where they could have won the game with a walk off field goal. In an interview published days before the 2018 NFL season, Marcus Williams explained that he had made peace with his error and its consequences: "I don't think about what everyone else is saying. I just do me and play."

The Vikings and Saints faced off once again at U.S. Bank Stadium in Week 8 of the 2018 season, in what was billed as a "rematch" of the Minneapolis Miracle game. The Saints won the game, 30–20. In the 2019 season, the two teams met again in the postseason, in a Wild Card game at the Superdome in New Orleans. The Vikings won in overtime, 26–20, with Kirk Cousins (acquired in free agency to be Minnesota's quarterback in 2018) throwing his own walk-off touchdown to Kyle Rudolph.

=== Reception ===
NFL.com writer Marc Sessler and The Ringer writer Robert Mays, among others, quickly deemed the game an "instant classic", worthy of entry into NFL lore. Several commentators – including Mays and former Vikings general manager Jeff Diamond – described the game as ending the Vikings' history of postseason heartbreak. Keenum and Diggs earned widespread praise for their late-game heroics. Joe Buck later told Rich Eisen in an interview: "As far as football, it's probably number one for exciting moments that I've been a part of."

Meanwhile, Williams – who earlier intercepted Keenum to help get New Orleans back into the game – was widely criticized for diving at Diggs instead of waiting to tackle him in bounds. Some compared the mistake to Bill Buckner's 1986 World Series error.

Saints punter Thomas Morstead was praised for his sportsmanship as he was the first player to return to the field for the extra point attempt. In recognition, Minnesota fans donated more than $221,000 to Morstead's charity.

== Starting lineups ==
The starting lineups for the game were:

New Orleans	Position		Minnesota
Offense
Ted Ginn	WR		Adam Thielen
Terron Armstead	LT		Riley Reiff
Senio Kelemete	G/C	LG	Mike Remmers
Max Unger	C		Pat Elflein
Larry Warford	RG		Joe Berger
Ryan Ramczyk	RT		Rashod Hill
Michael Hoomanawanui	TE		Kyle Rudolph
Michael Thomas	WR		Stefon Diggs
Drew Brees	QB		Case Keenum
Mark Ingram	RB		Latavius Murray
Austin Carr	WR	TE	David Morgan
Defense
George Johnson	LDE	LE	Danielle Hunter
Sheldon Rankins	LDT	DT	Tom Johnson
Tyeler Davison	RDT	NT	Linval Joseph
Cameron Jordan	RDE	RE	Everson Griffen
Craig Robertson	WIL	MLB	Eric Kendricks
Manti Te'o	MLB	SLB	Anthony Barr
Jonathan Freeny	SAM	LCB	Trae Waynes
Ken Crawley	LCB	RCB	Xavier Rhodes
Vonn Bell	SS	CB	Terence Newman
Marcus Williams	FS	SS	Andrew Sendejo
Marshon Lattimore	RCB	FS	Harrison Smith

== Officials ==
The officials for the game were:

- Referee: Gene Steratore (#114)
- Umpire: Roy Ellison (#81)
- Down judge: Thomas Symonette (#100)
- Line judge: Mark Steinkerchner (#84)
- Field judge: Scott Novak (#1)
- Side judge: Boris Cheek (#41)
- Back judge: Greg Meyer (#78)
- Replay official: Paul Weidner

== See also ==
- 2017–18 NFL playoffs
- The Catch (American football)
- Miracle at the Met
- 1998 NFC Championship Game
- 2022 Indianapolis Colts–Minnesota Vikings game
- Mile High Miracle
- Miracle in Miami
- Saints–Vikings rivalry
- List of nicknamed NFL games and plays
