= Greg Meyer (American football official) =

American football official

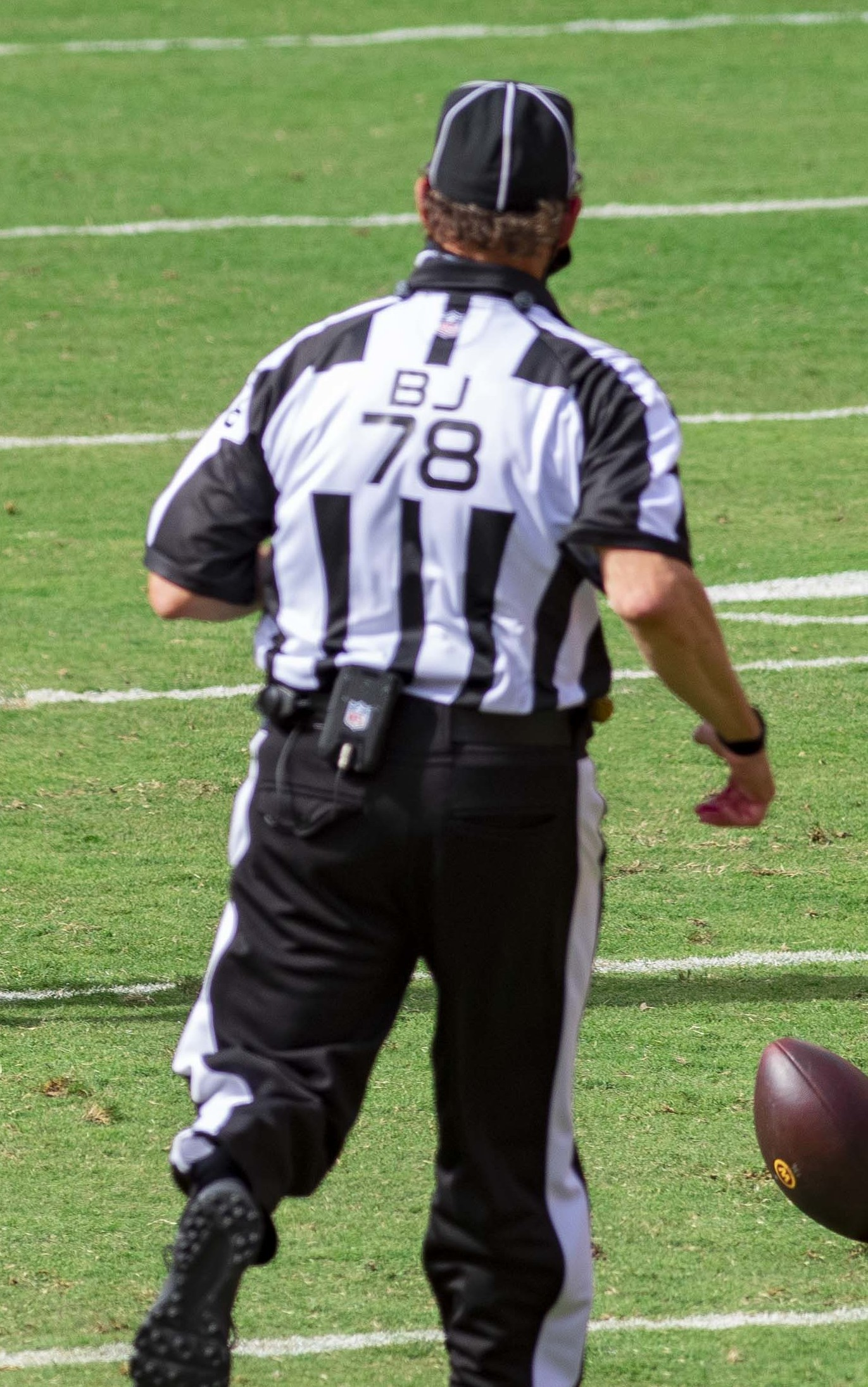
- Occupation: NFL official (2002–present)

Greg Meyer is an American football official in the National Football League (NFL) since the 2002 NFL season. He wears uniform number 78. A graduate of Texas Christian University, he began his football officiating career in 1995 at the collegiate level, including at least three different bowl games. Seven years later, he joined the NFL officiating staff as a field judge, and the following year, he became a side judge, and has been at that position until 2016, when he became a back judge. He officiated a few NFL postseason games, including Super Bowl XLIV in Miami and the Minneapolis Miracle.

Meyer, who lives in Fort Worth, Texas, has a wife, Debby, a daughter, Morgan, and a son, Reid. Outside of the NFL, Meyer is a banker.

For the 2017 NFL season, Meyer will serve on the officiating crew headed by Bill Vinovich.
