= Saints–Vikings rivalry =

National Football League rivalry

- New Orleans Saints Minnesota Vikings
- Location: New Orleans, Minneapolis
- First meeting: October 13, 1968; Saints 20, Vikings 17
- Latest meeting: October 11, 2026; Vikings 23, Saints 13
- Stadiums: Saints: Caesars Superdome; Vikings: U.S. Bank Stadium

Statistics
- Total meetings: 39
- All-time series: Vikings: 26–13
- Regular season series: Vikings: 22–12
- Postseason results: Vikings: 4–1
- Largest victory: Saints: 26–0 (1991); Vikings: 45–3 (1988)
- Most points scored: Saints: 52 (2020); Vikings: 45 (1988)
- Longest win streak: Saints: 4 (2009–2014); Vikings: 6 (1970–1976)
- Current win streak: Vikings: 3 (2022–present)

Post-season history
- 1987 NFC Wild Card: Vikings won: 44–10; 2000 NFC Divisional: Vikings won: 34–16; 2009 NFC Championship: Saints won: 31–28 (OT); 2017 NFC Divisional: Vikings won: 29–24; 2019 NFC Wild Card: Vikings won: 26–20 (OT)

The Saints–Vikings rivalry is a National Football League (NFL) rivalry between the New Orleans Saints and Minnesota Vikings. As the Saints play in the NFC South and the Vikings play in the NFC North, the two teams do not play each other every year; instead, they play at least once every three years and at least once every six seasons at each team's home stadium during which their divisions are paired up, sometimes more often if the two teams finish in the same place in their respective divisions or meet in the playoffs.

The Vikings have dominated most of the series. However, the resurgence of the Saints under Sean Payton and Drew Brees made the organization competitive with the Vikings. Games between these two teams have been consequential both in the regular season and playoffs for the NFC. Due to regular playoff matches between the two teams, the rivalry has become noteworthy in the last 20 years.

The Vikings lead the all-time series 26–13. The two clubs have met five times in the playoffs, with the Vikings holding a 4–1 record. The Vikings won 20 of the first 27 games (.741) through 2009, though the rivalry has been more competitive since then.

== Notable moments and games ==
- In January 1988, the Saints made their postseason debut by hosting the Vikings in the NFC wildcard game. New Orleans scored a touchdown on its first drive, but Minnesota took a 31–10 halftime lead and won 44–10.
- In January 2001, the 10–6 Saints traveled to Minnesota for a playoff game against the 11–5 Vikings. Vikings quarterback Daunte Culpepper threw for 302 yards as the Vikings defeated the Saints 34–16.
- In 2002, the 3–10 Vikings played the 9–4 Saints in a must-win game for the Saints. The Saints took a seven-point lead with just over 5 minutes remaining, but the Vikings responded with a touchdown pass from Culpepper to Randy Moss with five seconds left, narrowing the gap to a single point. Instead of kicking the extra point to tie the game, the Vikings elected to go for two; Culpepper ran the ball in himself to give the Vikings a 32–31 win and the Saints went on to miss the playoffs.
- In January 2010, the 12–4 Vikings traveled to New Orleans to play the 13–3 Saints in the NFC Championship Game. Despite dominating the Saints in terms of total yards, time of possession, first downs, and other key stats, the Vikings committed five costly turnovers (including three from quarterback Brett Favre), and the Saints managed to win in overtime, 31–28. This game was pivotal in the eventual changing of the league overtime rules, as the Vikings did not get a chance to score in overtime after the Saints. The Saints went on to defeat the Indianapolis Colts in Super Bowl XLIV. The match, particularly the way the Saints defense allegedly tried to deliberately injure Favre, would later be cited during the New Orleans Saints bounty scandal.
- In 2010, the Vikings traveled to New Orleans for a rematch of the NFC Championship game in one of the most anticipated games of the season. The Saints once again prevailed over the Vikings, this time by a score of 14–9. The Vikings' season spiraled out of control as they fell from 12–4 to 6–10, which included head coach Brad Childress being fired mid-season, the Metrodome collapsing mid-season, and the lackluster play from Brett Favre in what was his final season in the NFL. Meanwhile, the Saints finished 11–5 (second in the division behind the 13–3 Atlanta Falcons), and went on to lose to the Seattle Seahawks in the Beast Quake game.
- In the 2017 playoffs, the Saints traveled to Minnesota for an NFC Divisional Round Game. The Vikings jumped out to a 17–0 lead, controlling all key stats. However, the Saints mounted a second-half comeback and eventually took a 24–23 lead with under a minute to play. With ten seconds left, Vikings quarterback Case Keenum completed a pass to Stefon Diggs, who evaded a tackle attempt by Saints safety Marcus Williams and took the ball into the endzone for a walk off touchdown. This became known as the Minneapolis Miracle.
- In January 2020, the 10–6 Vikings traveled to New Orleans as heavy underdogs in an NFC wild-card game. Although the Saints jumped out to a quick 3–0 lead, the Saints struggled to muster the kind of offense they were known for in 2019. The Vikings at one point led 20–10 before the Saints forced overtime on a last-second field goal. In overtime, Vikings quarterback Kirk Cousins led the team on a drive that resulted in a touchdown to Kyle Rudolph.
- In 2020, the Vikings played in New Orleans for a Christmas Day match-up in week 16. With the score 31–27 after three quarters, the Saints scored 21 points in the fourth quarter to pull away 52–33. This game represented the worst Vikings' defensive performance in franchise history as they gave up 583 yards of offense to the Saints and allowed running back Alvin Kamara to tie the NFL record for rushing touchdowns in one game (6). This game eliminated the Vikings from playoff contention.
- In 2022, the teams faced off in London in week 4. The Saints needed to make a field goal late in the fourth quarter to send the game into overtime. A 32-yard pass from quarterback Andy Dalton to rookie receiver Chris Olave got the Saints to the Vikings' 43-yard line, setting up kicker Wil Lutz for a 61-yard field goal. He had made a 60-yard kick less than two minutes earlier, but with the game on the line, he hit the left upright and then the crossbar, sealing the Vikings 28–25 win.

== Season–by–season results ==
New Orleans Saints vs. Minnesota Vikings season-by-season results
1960s (Saints, 1–0)

Season	Results	Location	Overall series	Notes
1968	Saints; 20–17	Tulane Stadium	Saints; 1–0	First meeting, and the only one prior to the AFL-NFL merger

1970s (Vikings, 6–1)

Season	Results	Location	Overall series	Notes
1970	Vikings; 26–0	Metropolitan Stadium	Tied; 1–1	First meeting at Metropolitan Stadium
1971	Vikings; 23–10	Tulane Stadium	Vikings; 2–1	Last meeting at Tulane Stadium
1972	Vikings; 37–6	Metropolitan Stadium	Vikings; 3–1	
1974	Vikings; 29–9	Metropolitan Stadium	Vikings; 4–1	Vikings lose Super Bowl IX
1975	Vikings; 20–7	Louisiana Superdome	Vikings; 5–1	First meeting at Louisiana Superdome
1976	Vikings; 40–9	Louisiana Superdome	Vikings; 6–1	Vikings lose Super Bowl XI
1978	Saints; 31–24	Louisiana Superdome	Vikings; 6–2	

1980s (Vikings, 5–2)

Season	Results	Location	Overall series	Notes
1980	Vikings; 23–20	Louisiana Superdome	Vikings; 7–2	First game for interim Saints coach Dick Stanfel; Saints fall to 0-13 and finish 1-15
1981	Vikings; 20–10	Metropolitan Stadium	Vikings; 8–2	Last meeting at Metropolitan Stadium
1983	Saints; 17–16	Louisiana Superdome	Vikings; 8–3	
1985	Saints; 30–23	Hubert H. Humphrey Metrodome	Vikings; 8–4	First meeting at Hubert H. Humphrey Metrodome; Last game for Saints coach Bum Phillips
1986	Vikings; 33–17	Hubert H. Humphrey Metrodome	Vikings; 9–4	
1987 playoffs	Vikings 44–10	Louisiana Superdome	Vikings 10–4	NFC wild-card round; first postseason meeting in the series, and the first postseason game in Saints history
1988	Vikings; 45–3	Hubert H. Humphrey Metrodome	Vikings; 11–4	Vikings record their largest victory against the Saints with a 42–point differential and score their most points in a game against the Saints.

1990s (Vikings, 4–2)

Season	Results	Location	Overall series	Notes
1990	Vikings; 32–3	Hubert H. Humphrey Metrodome	Vikings; 12–4	
1991	Saints; 26–0	Louisiana Superdome	Vikings; 12–5	Saints record their largest victory against the Vikings with a 26–point differential.
1993	Saints; 17–14	Hubert H. Humphrey Metrodome	Vikings; 12–6	
1994	Vikings; 21–20	Hubert H. Humphrey Metrodome	Vikings; 13–6	
1995	Vikings; 43–24	Hubert H. Humphrey Metrodome	Vikings; 14–6	
1998	Vikings; 31–24	Hubert H. Humphrey Metrodome	Vikings; 15–6	

2000s (Vikings, 5–2)

Season	Results	Location	Overall series	Notes
2000 playoffs	Vikings 34–16	Hubert H. Humphrey Metrodome	Vikings 16–6	NFC Divisional Round; second postseason meeting
2001	Saints; 28–15	Louisiana Superdome	Vikings; 16–7	
2002	Vikings; 32–31	Louisiana Superdome	Vikings; 17–7	Saints wear alternate gold jersey for only time. With the win, the Vikings ended their 17-game road losing streak.
2004	Vikings; 38–31	Louisiana Superdome	Vikings; 18–7	
2005	Vikings; 33–16	Hubert H. Humphrey Metrodome	Vikings; 19–7	
2008	Vikings; 30–27	Louisiana Superdome	Vikings; 20–7	
2009 playoffs	Saints 31–28 (OT)	Louisiana Superdome	Vikings 20–8	NFC Championship Game; third postseason meeting, first overtime game in the series; Saints win Super Bowl XLIV.

2010s (Saints, 4–3)

Season	Results	Location	Overall series	Notes
2010	Saints; 14–9	Louisiana Superdome	Vikings; 20–9	NFL Kickoff Game
2011	Saints; 42–20	Hubert H. Humphrey Metrodome	Vikings; 20–10	Final meeting at Hubert H. Humphrey Metrodome
2014	Saints; 20–9	Mercedes-Benz Superdome	Vikings; 20–11	
2017	Vikings; 29–19	U.S. Bank Stadium	Vikings; 21–11	First meeting at U.S. Bank Stadium. Former Vikings running back Adrian Peterson starts for the Saints.
2017 playoffs	Vikings 29–24	U.S. Bank Stadium	Vikings 22–11	NFC Divisional Round; fourth postseason meeting; the Minneapolis Miracle marks the first time in NFL postseason history that a game-winning touchdown is scored on the final play of regulation.
2018	Saints; 30–20	U.S. Bank Stadium	Vikings; 22–12	
2019 playoffs	Vikings 26–20 (OT)	Mercedes-Benz Superdome	Vikings 23–12	NFC Wild-Card Round; fifth postseason meeting; the Saints' season ends on the final play of a playoff loss for the third straight season, with two of the three against the Vikings.

2020s (Vikings, 3–1)

Season	Results	Location	Overall series	Notes
2020	Saints; 52–33	Mercedes-Benz Superdome	Vikings; 23–13	Christmas Day game. Saints score their most points in a game against the Vikings and eliminate them from playoff contention. Saints RB Alvin Kamara rushed for 6 touchdowns. Vikings allowed 583 total yards, setting a franchise record for most yards allowed in a game.
2022	Vikings; 28–25	Tottenham Hotspur Stadium	Vikings; 24–13	Game played as part of the NFL International Series, officially a Saints home game
2023	Vikings; 27–19	U.S. Bank Stadium	Vikings; 25–13	
2026	Vikings; 23–13	Caesars Superdome	Vikings; 26–13	

Results summary

Season	Season series	at New Orleans Saints	at Minnesota Vikings	Notes
Regular season	Vikings 22–12	Vikings 9–8	Vikings 13–4	Vikings 1–0 in London (officially a Saints home game)
Postseason	Vikings 4–1	Vikings 2–1	Vikings 2–0	NFC Wild Card: 1987, 2019; NFC Divisional: 2000, 2017; NFC Championship: 2009
Regular and postseason	Vikings 26–13	Vikings 11–9	Vikings 15–4	

== See also ==
- List of NFL rivalries
- Minneapolis Miracle
- New Orleans Saints bounty scandal
