= Skol, Vikings =

Fight song of the Minnesota Vikings

Lyrics

Skol Vikings, let's win this game,
Skol Vikings, honor your name,
Go get that first down,
Then get a touchdown.
Rock 'em . . .Sock em
Fight! Fight! Fight! Fight!
Go Vikings, run up the score,
You'll hear us yell for more. . .
V-I-K-I-N-G-S
Skol Vikings, let's go!

"Skol, Vikings" (/skoʊl/) is the fight song of the Minnesota Vikings of the National Football League. It was introduced around the time the team was founded in 1961. The words and music are attributed to James "Red" McLeod, a composer from Edina, Minnesota. The word skol is an anglicization of the Swedish, Danish, and Norwegian skål, meaning "cheers!"

The old recording is usually played whenever the team scores, accompanied by cheerleaders carrying flags that spell out the team's name, as in the lyrics. It is also played at the end of the game, after a victory.

== Skol Chant ==
When the Vikings moved into U.S. Bank Stadium in 2016, they started a new tradition at home games, called the "Skol Chant". At various points during the game, Viking fans raise their hands and after two beats of a drum, they clap in time and yell, "Skol!" The drum beats increase in tempo until the applause is near-constant. The chant is a copy of the "Viking war chant" made famous by supporters of the Iceland national football team during their run to the quarter-finals of UEFA Euro 2016. The Vikings joined up with Iceland midfielder Aron Gunnarsson and strongman Hafþór Júlíus Björnsson to introduce the chant. Iceland supporters are believed to have started the chant after it was performed by fans of Motherwell F.C. during a UEFA Europa League match between Motherwell and Icelandic club Stjarnan in July 2014, although there is evidence of fans of both RC Lens and Middlesbrough F.C. doing the same in 2013.

== Gophers and Minnesota Rouser ==
The spelling-out of the team name echoes the style of the "Minnesota Rouser", the fight song of the University of Minnesota.

Many of the University of Minnesota's fight songs were also written and/or arranged by McLeod. To honor this connection, the university pep bands often perform a rendition of the song, retitled "Skol, Gophers", with "G-O-P-H-E-R-S" replacing the spell-out and sometimes other specific sport-related changes.
