= Marcus Williams (safety) =

American football player (born 1996)

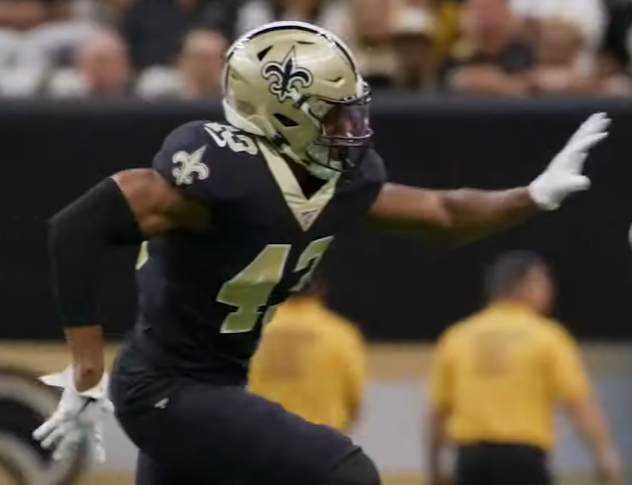
- Williams with the New Orleans Saints in 2019

Profile
- Position: Safety

Personal information
- Born: September 8, 1996 (age 30); Corona, California, U.S.
- Listed height: 6 ft 1 in (1.85 m)
- Listed weight: 204 lb (93 kg)

Career information
- High school: Eleanor Roosevelt (Eastvale, California)
- College: Utah (2014–2016)
- NFL draft: 2017: 2nd round, 42nd overall pick

Career history
- New Orleans Saints (2017–2021); Baltimore Ravens (2022–2024); Los Angeles Chargers (2025)

Awards and highlights
- PFWA All-Rookie Team (2017); First-team All-Pac-12 (2015); Second-team All-Pac-12 (2016)

Career NFL statistics as of 2025
- Total tackles: 479
- Sacks: 1
- Forced fumbles: 3
- Fumble recoveries: 4
- Pass deflections: 56
- Interceptions: 20
- Defensive touchdowns: 1
- Stats at Pro Football Reference

Marcus Alan Williams (born September 8, 1996) is an American professional football safety. He played college football for the Utah Utes.

== Early life ==
Williams attended Eleanor Roosevelt High School in Eastvale, California. He played wide receiver and defensive back for the Mustangs football team. He also played basketball and ran track. He committed to play college football at the University of Utah over competing scholarship offers from Washington and California.

== College career ==
As a true freshman at Utah in 2014, Williams played in all 13 games and made six starts. He finished the 2014 season with 59 tackles and an interception. As a sophomore in 2015, he was named first-team All-Pac-12 after he recorded 65 tackles and five interceptions in 13 starts. He intercepted a pass from California's Jared Goff in the Utes' 30–24 win on October 10. As a junior in 2016, after missing some games due to injury, he returned on November 10 against Arizona State and recorded nine tackles and had an interception in the end zone. He played in 11 games, recording 64 tackles and five interceptions. He recorded four interceptions during the regular season and was a second-team All-Pac-12 selection. After the season, Williams entered the 2017 NFL draft. He finished his college career with 11 interceptions and 188 total tackles. He was predicted to be a first-round or second-round selection by several sportswriters and mock drafts.

== Professional career ==
=== Pre-draft ===
Williams received an invitation to the NFL Combine and completed all of the combine drills. He also attended Utah's Pro Day and opted to only run positional drills for team scouts and representatives. NFL draft experts and analysts projected him to be selected in the second or third round. He was ranked the fifth best safety in the draft by NFL analyst Bucky Brooks, Mike Mayock, and Sports Illustrated, ranked the third best free safety by NFLDraftScout.com, and was ranked the eighth best safety by ESPN.

External videos
- Williams' NFL Combine workout

Pre-draft measurables
Height	Weight	Arm length	Hand span	Wingspan	40-yard dash	10-yard split	20-yard split	20-yard shuttle	Three-cone drill	Vertical jump	Broad jump	Bench press	Wonderlic
6 ft 0 5/8 in (1.84 m)	202 lb (92 kg)	32 1/2 in (0.83 m)	9 1/2 in (0.24 m)	6 ft 5 7/8 in (1.98 m)	4.56 s	1.59 s	2.68 s	4.20 s	6.85 s	43.5 in (1.10 m)	10 ft 9 in (3.28 m)	14 reps	34
All values from NFL Combine

=== New Orleans Saints ===
The New Orleans Saints selected Williams in the second round (42nd overall) of the 2017 NFL draft. He was the sixth safety selected in 2017.

External videos
- Saints select Williams 42nd overall

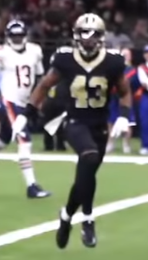
Williams in 2017

==== 2017 ====
On June 3, 2017, the New Orleans Saints signed Williams to a four–year, $6.24 million contract that includes $3.42 million guaranteed and a signing bonus of $2.67 million.

During training camp, Williams competed for the role as a starting free safety against Vonn Bell. Head coach Sean Payton named him a backup safety to begin the season, behind starting safeties Vonn Bell and Kenny Vaccaro.

On September 11, 2017, Williams made his professional regular season debut and first career start in the New Orleans Saints' season-opener at the Minnesota Vikings and recorded five combined tackles (three solo) during their 29–19 loss. He was credited with his first career tackle on wide receiver Stefon Diggs after pushing him out of bounds on the Vikings' first drive, but drew an unnecessary roughness penalty after hitting Diggs while he was out of bounds. On September 24, 2017, Williams made two tackles, a pass deflection, and had his first career interception off a pass by Cam Newton to running back Christian McCaffrey during a 34–13 win at the Carolina Panthers. He was inactive for the Saints' Week 13 victory against the Carolina Panthers, due to a groin injury he sustained the previous week. On December 31, 2017, Williams collected a season-high eight combined tackles (seven solo), two pass deflections, and made a season-high two interceptions off pass attempts by Jameis Winston during a 31–24 loss at the Tampa Bay Buccaneers. He finished his rookie season with 73 combined tackles (59 solo), seven pass deflections, and four interceptions in 15 games and 15 starts. During the season, Williams was used as a third safety in Dennis Allen's three-safety technique and as an extra defensive back in nickel and dime packages. Pro Football Focus gave Williams an overall grade of 86.8, ranking him 11th among all qualified safeties in 2017. He was named to the PFWA All-Rookie Team.

The New Orleans Saints finished the 2017 NFL season first in the NFC South with an 11–5 record. On January 7, 2018, Williams started his first career playoff game and recorded eight combined tackles (six solo) and a pass deflection during a 31–26 victory against the Carolina Panthers in the NFC Wildcard Game.

External videos
- Sound FX: Stefon Diggs' Walkoff TD
- Williams "I just gotta make the tackle."

On January 14, 2018, Williams made five combined tackles (three solo), two pass deflections, and intercepted a pass from Case Keenum, leading to a Saints' touchdown, bringing them within three points of the Vikings. As the Saints were up by one point with only a few seconds remaining, Williams attempted a tackle on Stefon Diggs , diving low with his head down, but missed the tackle and knocked over teammate Ken Crawley instead. With no other defenders left between Diggs and the end zone, he caught a pass and ran untouched into the end zone to score a 61–yard touchdown as time expired, giving Minnesota a 29–24 victory in the Divisional Round. The play became known as the Minneapolis Miracle.

==== 2018 ====
Following the departure of Kenny Vaccaro, Williams was slated to takeover as a starting safety. Defensive coordinator Dennis Allen had a revamped secondary that included Eli Apple, Patrick Robinson, and Kurt Coleman. Head coach Sean Payton named Williams the starting free safety to begin the season and paired him with Vonn Bell.

On September 9, 2018, Williams started in the Saints' home-opener against the Tampa Bay Buccaneers and racked up a season-high six combined tackles (five solo) during a 40–48 loss. The following week, he recorded four solo tackles, deflected a pass, and intercepted a pass thrown by Tyrod Taylor to tight end David Njoku during a 21–18 victory against the Cleveland Browns in Week 2. On November 22, 2018, Williams produced five solo tackles and forced a fumble while making the first sack of his career on Matt Ryan for a six–yard loss and was also able to recover the fumble as the Saints defeated the Atlanta Falcons 17–31. He started all 16 games in 2018 and recorded a total of 59 combined tackles (49 solo), three pass deflections, two interceptions, one sack, a forced fumble, and one fumble recovery.

==== 2019 ====
He returned as the Saints' starting free safety, alongside Vonn Bell, to begin the regular season. In Week 4, Williams had two solo tackles, a pass deflection, and intercepted a Hail Mary pass thrown by Dak Prescott to seal a 12–10 win against the Dallas Cowboys. On November 10, 2019, Williams made seven combined tackles (five solo), a season-high four pass deflections, and intercepted a pass by Matt Ryan to wide receiver Calvin Ridley as the Saints were routed 26–9 by the Atlanta Falcons. On November 17, 2019, he made four solo tackles, two pass deflections, and returned an interception thrown by Jameis Winston to Mike Evans 55–yards for a touchdown during a 34–17 win at the Tampa Bay Buccaneers. In Week 13, he racked up a season-high seven combined tackles (six solo) in the Saints' 26–18 win at the Atlanta Falcons. He finished with a total of 55 combined tackles (40 solo), 13 pass deflections, and four interceptions in 15 games and 15 starts.

==== 2020 ====
Head coach Sean Payton named Williams the starting strong safety to start the season and paired him with Malcolm Jenkins following the departure of Vonn Bell.

In Week 1 against the Buccaneers, Williams recorded his first interception off a pass thrown by Tom Brady during the 34–23 win.

==== 2021 ====
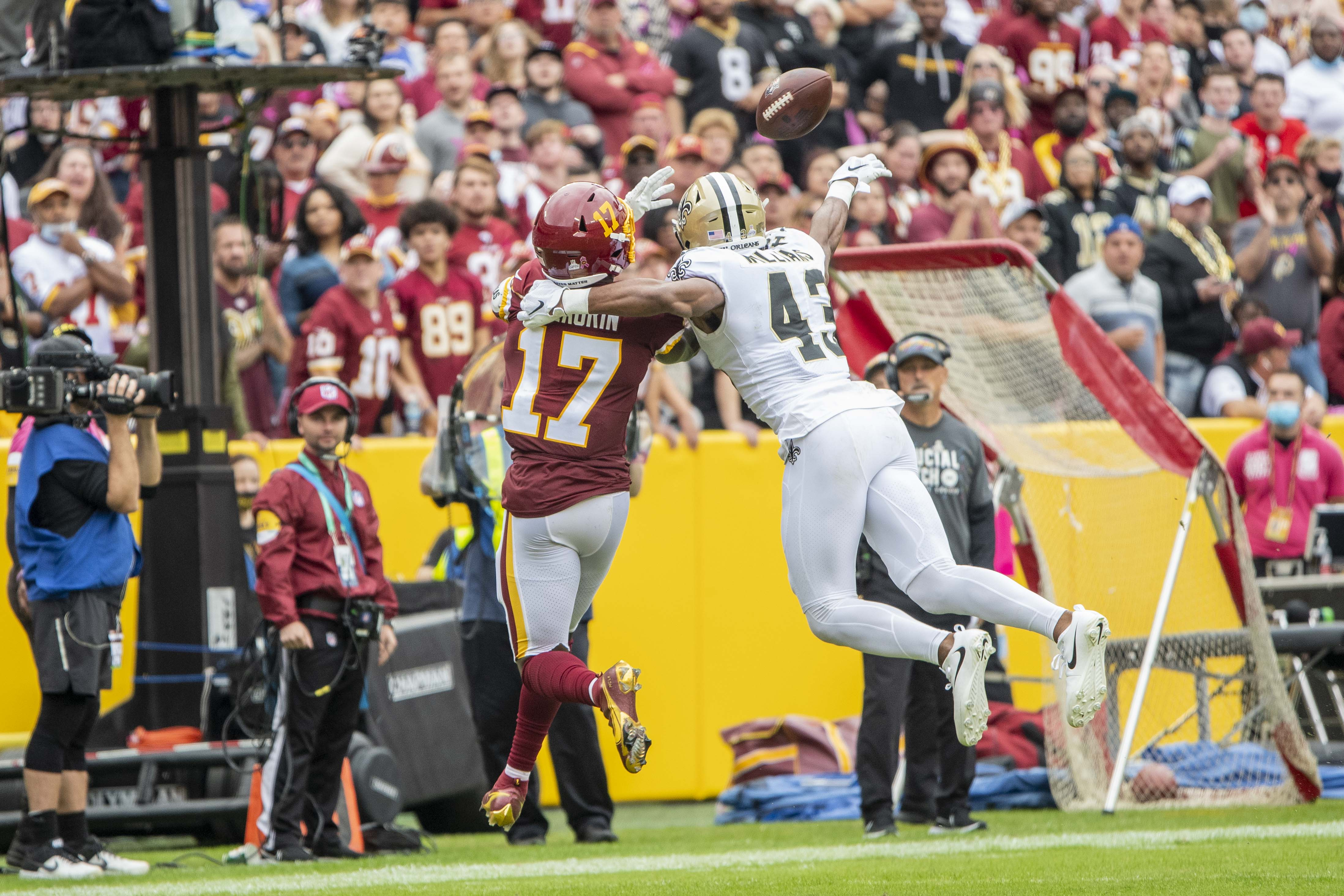
Williams playing against the Washington Football Team in 2021.

On March 9, 2021, the New Orleans Saints placed the franchise tag on Williams. On March 30, 2021, the Saints signed Williams to a fully-guaranteed one–year, $10.61 million contract.

=== Baltimore Ravens ===
==== 2022 ====
On March 16, 2022, the Baltimore Ravens signed Williams to a five–year, $70 million contract that includes $37 million guaranteed, $32 million guaranteed upon signing, and an initial signing bonus of $14.96 million.

In Week 1 against the New York Jets, he was the team's leading tackler with 12 combined tackles as well as a 33-yard interception return and a forced fumble. The Ravens would win 24–9. He suffered a dislocated wrist in Week 5 and was placed on injured reserve on October 11, 2022. He was activated on December 10.

==== 2023 ====
In 2023, Williams suffered a torn pectoral in his left shoulder in the Ravens' season opening win over the Texans. He decided to forego surgery in order to return for the season. Despite missing six games overall, Williams still had a solid regular season, finishing with 55 combined tackles, eight pass breakups and an interception.

==== 2024 ====
Williams would reprise his role at starting safety in 2024, but his play regressed significantly, causing the Ravens to have one of the worst passing defenses in the NFL at the beginning of the season. He was benched for Week 8's game against the Cleveland Browns, but was put back in the starting role the next week after his replacement Eddie Jackson performed so poorly that he was benched. Williams’ play did not improve over the next two weeks and he was subsequently benched again with Ar'Darius Washington replacing him. Williams was inactive as a healthy scratch for the final five games of the season.

On March 12, 2025, Williams was released by the Ravens.

=== Los Angeles Chargers ===
On October 28, 2025, Williams signed with the Los Angeles Chargers' practice squad.

== NFL career statistics ==
Legend
**Bold**	Career high

=== Regular season ===
Year	Team	Games		Tackles				Interceptions					Fumbles			
Year	Team	GP	GS	Cmb	Solo	Ast	Sck	PD	Int	Yds	Avg	TD	FF	FR	Yds	TD
2017	NO	15	15	73	**59**	14	0.0	7	**4**	12	3.0	0	0	0	0	0
2018	NO	**16**	**16**	59	49	10	**1.0**	3	2	**100**	**50.0**	0	1	1	0	0
2019	NO	15	15	55	40	15	0.0	**13**	**4**	56	14.0	**1**	1	1	0	0
2020	NO	14	14	59	39	20	0.0	7	3	37	12.3	0	0	0	0	0
2021	NO	**16**	**16**	**74**	52	**22**	0.0	8	2	56	28.0	0	1	0	0	0
2022	BAL	10	10	61	44	17	0.0	8	**4**	33	8.3	0	0	1	0	0
2023	BAL	11	11	55	35	20	0.0	8	1	22	22.0	0	0	0	0	0
2024	BAL	5	5	20	15	5	0.0	2	0	0	0.0	0	0	1	0	0
Career		102	102	456	333	123	1.0	56	20	316	15.8	1	3	4	0	0
