= Bountygate =

National Football League scandal (2009–2012)

- Date: 2009–2012
- Venue: NFL
- Participants: Gregg Williams, Sean Payton, Michael Ornstein, Joe Vitt, 22 to 27 Saints players
- Outcome: Mass suspensions, federal court hearings and litigation

Bountygate was a National Football League (NFL) scandal involving an illegal program in which the New Orleans Saints placed bounties on opposing players. If a targeted player was injured and knocked out of a game, a bonus would be paid to the defensive player that made the hit. A slush fund for paying the bounties was found to have operated from the 2009 season (the year in which the Saints won Super Bowl XLIV) to the 2011–12 playoffs.

League commissioner Roger Goodell responded with some of the most severe sanctions in the league's history and among the most severe punishments for in-game misconduct in North American professional sports history. Defensive coordinator Gregg Williams was suspended indefinitely, though this would be overturned the following year. Head coach Sean Payton was suspended for the entire 2012 season—the first time since Chuck Fairbanks in 1978 that a head coach had been suspended and the first time a head coach was suspended by the league. General manager Mickey Loomis was suspended for the first eight games of the 2012 season—the first time that a general manager was suspended by the league for any reason. Assistant head coach Joe Vitt was suspended for the first six games of the 2012 season.

The Saints organization was penalized with a $500,000 fine and had to forfeit their second-round draft selections in 2012 and 2013. In May 2012, four current and former Saints players were suspended after being named as participants in the scandal, with linebacker Jonathan Vilma also being suspended for the entire 2012 season. However, former NFL commissioner Paul Tagliabue overturned all sanctions against the players in December 2012 after finding that although the players were "very much involved", the coaches and the Saints organization were primarily responsible for the scandal. After reviewing all of the NFL's evidence, DeMaurice Smith, the then-executive director of the National Football League Players Association, stated in December 2012 there was "certainly no evidence that the bounties existed".

== Background ==
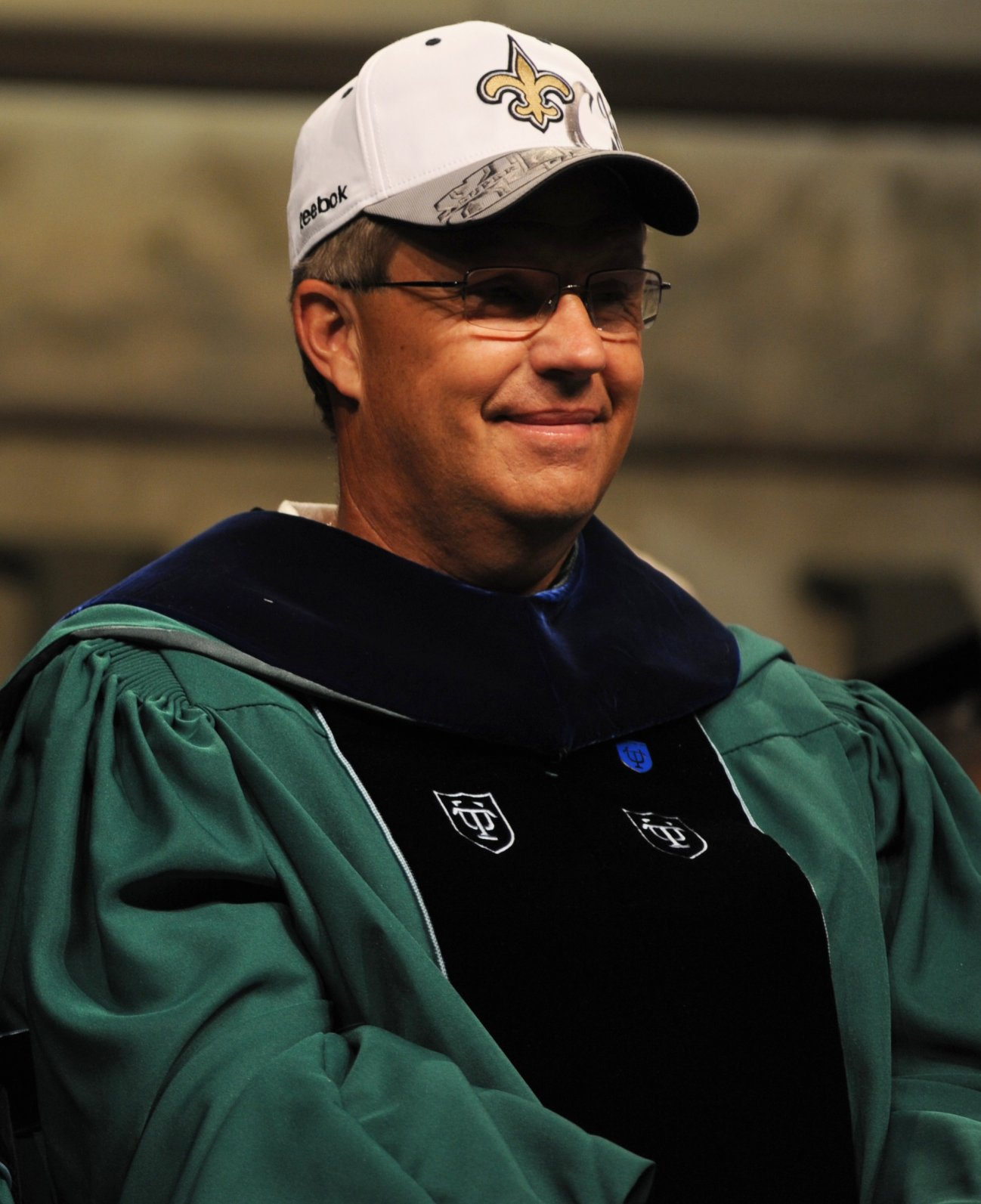
Saints defensive coordinator Gregg Williams was accused of administrating a slush fund meant to reward players for injuring members of the opposition.

The NFL has long frowned upon "non-contract bonuses"; but an underground culture of "pay for play" systems is alleged to exist, with teams, it is claimed, turning a blind eye to the practice. The league constitution specifically forbids payment of bonuses based on performances against an individual player or team, as well as bonuses for on-field misconduct; the NFL holds that such practices undermine the integrity of the game, and also would allow teams to use such payments to circumvent the salary cap. The collective bargaining agreement with the NFL Players Association also forbids this practice, as does the standard NFL player contract. Every year, the NFL sends a memo, reiterating this ban to every team before training camp opens. However, according to many former players, bounty systems of some sort have been around the NFL for decades, with the percentage of players participating speculated to be between 30 and 40 percent. According to these players, such programs were usually informal and often between players only, more with intent at locker-room braggadocio than systemic malice. What would draw attention to the Saints' program was the alleged practice of methodically organizing such a concept at the coaches' level, where the Saints players were allegedly rewarded for injuring opposing star players.

After the Saints defeated the Minnesota Vikings in the 2009 NFC Championship Game in what became a heated rivalry, several Vikings players and coaches claimed that the Saints were deliberately trying to injure Vikings quarterback Brett Favre. The Vikings were particularly feeling suspicious when Saints defensive end Bobby McCray and defensive tackle Remi Ayodele knocked Favre to the ground with a high-low hit. McCray hit Favre below the knees, briefly knocking Favre out of the game with an ankle injury. No penalty was called on the play, though NFL vice president of officiating Mike Pereira said that a penalty should have been called, saying it was "the type of hit we don't want." Vikings coach Brad Childress later said that there were at least 13 instances where he felt the Saints deliberately went after Favre. Later, CBSSports.com NFL columnist Clark Judge said that several Vikings assistants told him they believed McCray was acting on direct orders from Williams, with at least one being so outraged that he threatened to "punch [Williams] in the face" the next time they met. Vikings owner Zygi Wilf even went as far as to complain to the league about what happened to Favre, though no action was taken at the time. Favre took such a severe beating that Vikings punter Chris Kluwe and placekicker Ryan Longwell wondered during the game if someone had put a bounty on him.

Favre's agent, Bus Cook, later said that he also felt the Saints were deliberately trying to knock Favre out of the game, and claimed that several hits on Arizona Cardinals quarterback Kurt Warner in the divisional round a week earlier were a similar manner as well. It initially appeared that Cook's argument was strengthened by the fact that Warner was knocked out of that game with a chest injury (although he later returned), and retired two weeks later. However, Warner later said that the hit which knocked him out was legal, and had nothing to do with his decision to retire. Additionally, Favre later said he viewed the NFL's allegations against the Saints as "just hearsay" and that he did not "see enough evidence" the Saints had a bounty on him. In Favre's biography, author Jeff Pearlman wrote that former Vikings offensive lineman Artis Hicks who played with Favre said the Minnesota Vikings ran a bounty program at the time where a player was awarded with cash if they "hurt someone special". The NFL declined to investigate these claims regarding the Vikings' alleged bounty program.

== Investigation ==
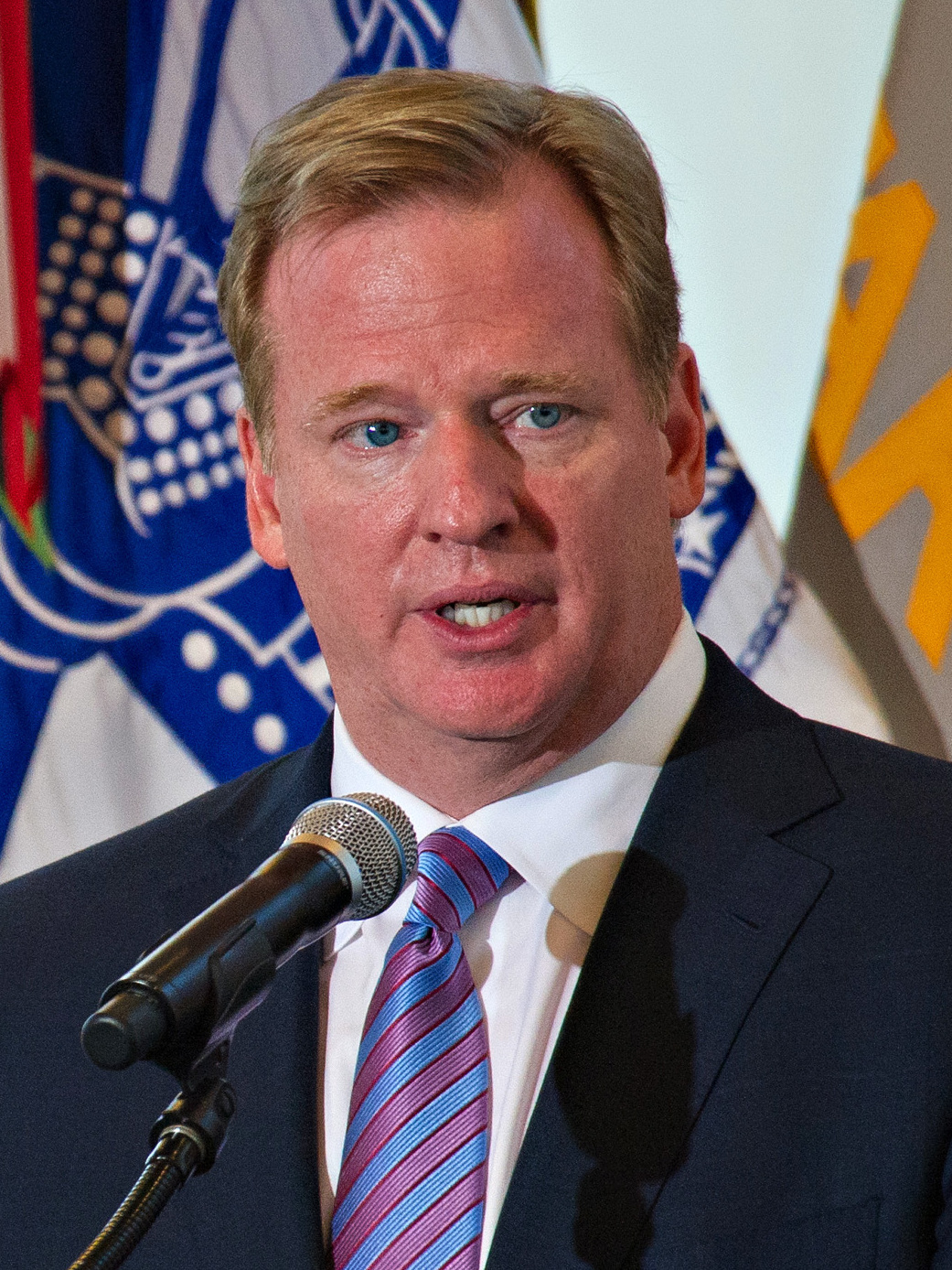
NFL Commissioner Roger Goodell launched the investigation into the bounty program allegations.

In the 2010 offseason, the NFL claimed that an anonymous player told NFL officials that the Saints had targeted Favre and Warner as part of a bounty program administered by Williams; the NFL's security department found the allegations credible enough to open an investigation. However, the players and team officials interviewed all denied that any bounty program ever existed, and the player who was claimed to have made the initial report, former Minnesota Vikings defensive lineman Jimmy Kennedy, stated that the NFL's story about him was a lie and described the NFL's investigation as "shoddy, careless, [and] shameful". Kennedy further stated he felt "damaged by the NFL's complete disregard for truth and integrity".

The NFL began investigating the Saints in 2010 in response to allegations of deliberate attempts to injure players during the 2009–10 playoffs, but the case went cold until it was reopened late in the 2011 season. On March 2, 2012, the NFL announced that it had evidence that defensive coordinator Gregg Williams had created the program soon after his arrival in 2009, and alleged that "between 22 and 27 Saints players" were involved. Williams and the players pooled their own money to pay out performance bonuses. It also asserted that head coach Sean Payton tried to cover up the scheme, and that he and general manager Mickey Loomis failed to shut it down when ordered to do so by team owner Tom Benson. Since then, Williams was accused of operating similar schemes during his tenure as defensive coordinator of the Tennessee Oilers/Titans and (since renamed) Washington Redskins and as head coach of the Buffalo Bills; the NFL briefly investigated these allegations, but elected to focus solely on the Saints.

In December 2012, CBS News reported on an interview it conducted with DeMaurice Smith, the then-executive director of the National Football League Players Association, regarding the "bounty program". Smith stated he had reviewed nearly 50,000 pages of evidence and nearly 20 hours of testimony and concluded, "There was certainly no evidence that the bounties existed". Smith also stated that the NFL should apologize for how they conducted the investigation because they had "maligned the character of good players".

== Whistleblower ==
In 2012, ESPN reported that former New Orleans Saints defensive assistant Mike Cerullo contacted the NFL regarding a bounty program after the 2009 postseason. Cerullo was released after the 2009 postseason for poor performance and lying about personal leave according to the New Orleans Saints. Cerullo testified that he kept track of payments and pledges made. Cerullo also states in the article, "I was angry for being let go from the Saints". Testimony during the Saints' appeals process revealed that Payton once asked for police protection for his family when he was out of town because he considered Cerullo a threat. In the summer of 2017, the NFL hired Mike Cerullo as Director of Football Administration. Cerullo later served as director of football operations at Princeton University.

== Findings revealed ==
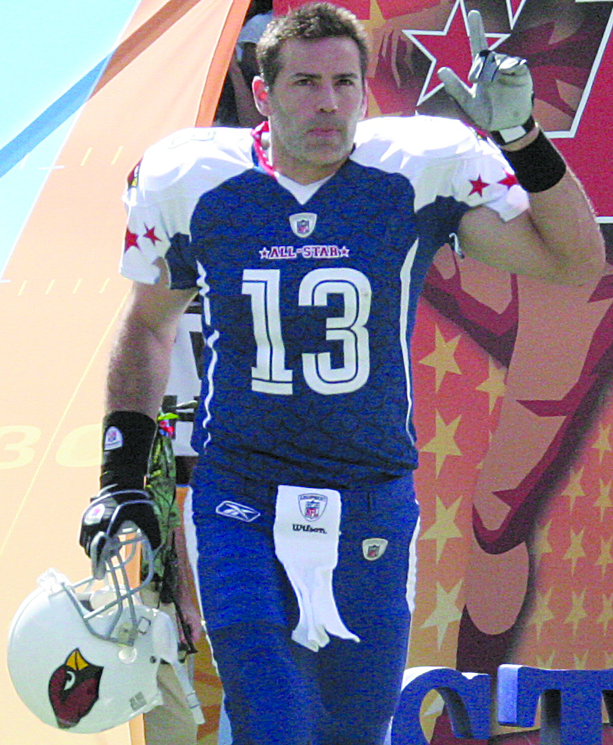
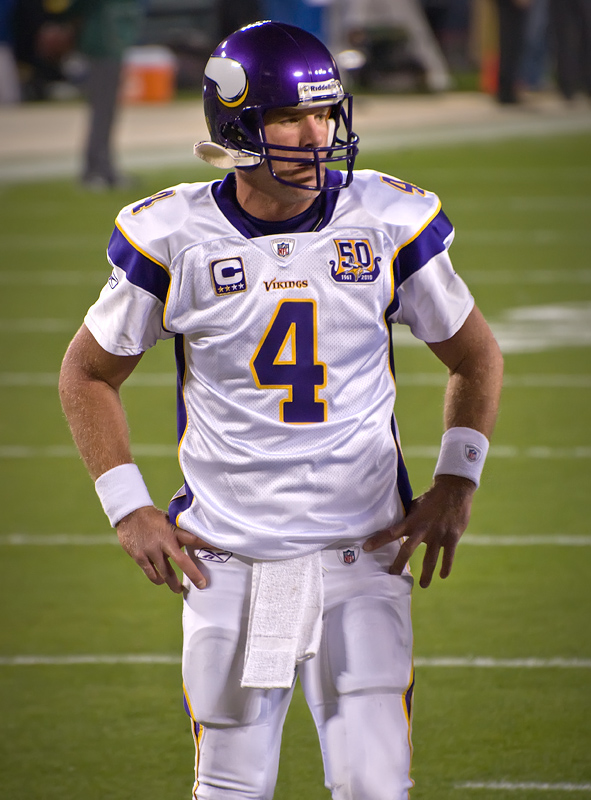
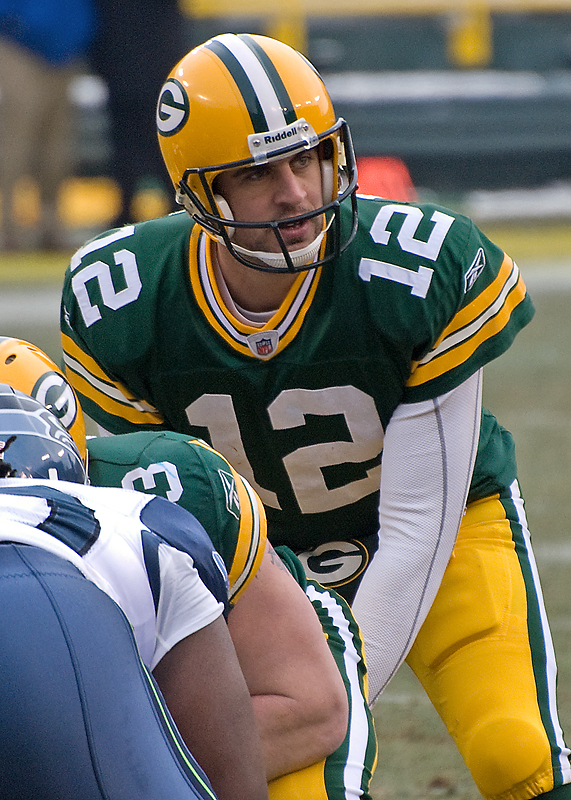
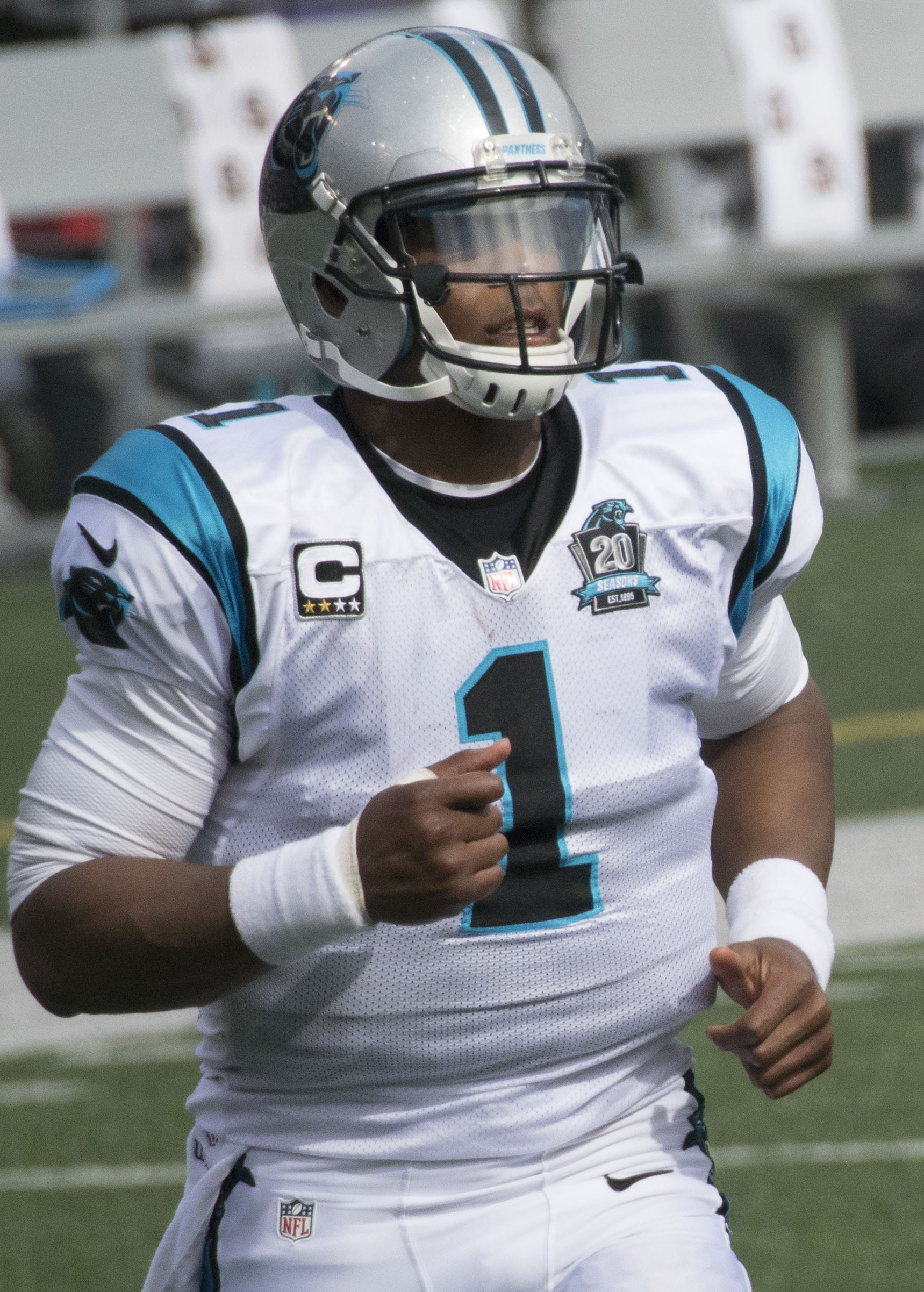
The league found that high-profile quarterbacks such as Kurt Warner, Brett Favre, Aaron Rodgers, and Cam Newton were the alleged main targets of the bounty program.

Late in the 2011 season, the NFL received what it called "significant and credible new information" that suggested there was indeed a "bounty" program in place. League officials, convinced that this information was irrefutable evidence a program was indeed in place, alerted Benson of their findings just before the Saints' first-round playoff game against the Detroit Lions. The investigation continued during the 2011–12 playoffs and continued through the 2012 offseason.

On March 2, 2012, ESPN's Adam Schefter reported that the NFL had indeed found evidence of a bounty program. Later that day, the NFL announced it had obtained irrefutable proof of a bounty pool dating back to the 2009 season, based on a review of 18,000 documents. It determined that Williams had initiated the fund soon after he arrived in New Orleans in 2009, in hopes of making the defense more aggressive. Between 22 and 27 Saints defensive players were involved. The players and Williams contributed their own cash to the pot, and received cash payments based on their performance in the previous week's game. For instance, a special teamer who downed a kick returner inside the receiving team's 20-yard-line earned $100. Players could also be fined for mental mistakes and penalties. Players also received "bounties" for "cartoffs" (plays in which an opponent was removed from the field on a stretcher or cart) and "knockouts" (plays that resulted in a player being unable to return for the rest of the game). Players usually earned $1,000 for cart-offs and $1,500 for knockouts during the regular season, though they were encouraged to put their winnings back into the pot in order to raise the stakes as the season went on. Payments were known to double or even triple during the playoffs.

The NFL sent a confidential and detailed memo to all 32 teams detailing its findings. It revealed that the Saints had not only targeted Warner and Favre during the 2009 playoffs, but had also targeted Green Bay Packers quarterback Aaron Rodgers and Carolina Panthers quarterback Cam Newton during the 2011 regular season. According to that memo, Saints linebacker Jonathan Vilma offered $10,000 cash to any teammate who knocked Favre out of the NFC Championship Game. Another source told CBSSports.com's Mike Freeman that Reggie Bush's agent at the time, Michael Ornstein, was closely involved in the scheme from the beginning, having pledged $10,000 to the pot in 2009 in addition to an undisclosed amount in 2011.

After later investigations in the 2012 offseason, the NFL also found evidence that the Saints put bounties on several Seattle Seahawks players during their 2011 wildcard playoffs game. Specific players targeted included Matt Hasselbeck, Marshawn Lynch, and Mike Williams. It was also revealed that the Saints' bounty on Favre was worth up to $35,000. In addition to Vilma's contribution to the pot, Ornstein and Saints defensive end Charles Grant each pledged $10,000, while Vitt pledged $5,000.

The league found that Payton not only knew about the scheme but also tried to cover it up during both league investigations. During the 2010 investigation, Payton told Williams and Vitt to "make sure our ducks are in a row" when the league interviewed them. Before the start of the 2011 season, Payton received an email from Ornstein, detailing the broader lines of the scheme. In that same email, Ornstein offered $5,000 to anyone who knocked Rodgers out of the 2011 season opener. Payton initially denied knowing that this email existed, but subsequently admitted that, in fact, he had read it fully.

When Benson was informed of the league's findings, he called in Payton and Loomis, and ordered the program to be shut down immediately. However, they did not do so. Loomis had been interviewed during the 2010 investigation as well, and had stated that he knew of no such scheme and would stop it immediately if it were taking place. The league also found that Vitt, whom Payton had assigned to monitor Williams (the two reportedly didn't get along very well), also knew about the broader lines of the scheme and even witnessed Williams handing out payments to players. However, Vitt failed to tell anyone about it.

The NFL found that Payton's and Loomis' misfeasance amounted to "conduct detrimental" to the league. The NFL found no club money had been used to fund the bounty pool, and praised Benson for doing what he could to shut down the slush fund. Nevertheless, it found the Saints organization as a whole guilty of conduct detrimental to the league as well due to Williams and the players' maintenance of the bounty pool, as well as Loomis and Payton's failure to act "in a responsible manner" to stop it.

Several Chicago Bears players and fans believed that the Bears were targets of this program during the second game of the 2011 season, a 30–13 loss to the Saints. Quarterback Jay Cutler was sacked six times, and nearly lost his voice when a Saints player kicked him in the throat. Later in the same game, offensive tackle Frank Omiyale yanked a Saints defender off Cutler when he saw what he later called "some dirty stuff". Tampa Bay Buccaneers quarterback Josh Freeman reported that the Saints tendency toward illegal hits was common knowledge among the Tampa Bay coaching staff. Preparations for Saints games included warnings to offensive players to keep their knees protected, especially on plays near the sidelines.

In June 2012, the league revealed that it possessed a ledger detailing the weekly earnings of the players, which were earned for cartoffs ($1000) and "whacks" ($400) and deducted for "mental errors". The NFL has never publicized a copy of this ledger nor any other documentation claimed to prove the existence of the bounties.

However, on July 26, 2012, Vilma and seven other witnesses from the Saints testified in front of a federal judge in New Orleans that NFL commissioner Roger Goodell got his facts wrong in the bounty scandal. "Everybody was sworn in under oath in front of a judge with the risk of perjury and jail time if we were lying, and categorically denied there was a bounty," Vilma said in a text message to ESPN's Ed Werder. "Seven people testified, 2 sworn affidavits all saying the same thing. I ask that you and ESPN report the facts. No more bias or b.s. or hearsay. I gave you facts that you can report if so choose." Tulane University Sports Law Program Director Gabe Feldman (who attended the hearing in court) said, "Clearly the judge, by her questions, indicated she thinks Goodell overstepped his authority, and this case was always going to be about if he executed his power fairly... The NFL's retort is that with all due deference, you don't get to second guess (Goodell). Judges only have limited jurisdiction over arbitration issues."

== Other allegations against Williams ==
Shortly after the Saints' bounty system came to light, four former Washington Redskins players, as well as a coach, told The Washington Post that Williams operated a similar system while he was the Redskins' defensive coordinator from 2004 to 2007. The players said that Williams paid his crew thousands of dollars for aggressive play, with the biggest payouts—as much as $8,000—coming for "kill shots" that knocked opposing players out of games. Chicago Tribune NFL analyst Matt Bowen, who played for the Redskins at the time, later wrote in one of his regular columns that the bounty pool was funded by fines for mistakes made during practice and in games, and insisted similar systems operated on other teams. On March 4, The Post reported that the NFL was investigating the allegations against Williams with the Redskins.

Several former Bills players subsequently told The Buffalo News of a similar system during Williams' tenure as Bills' head coach from 2001 to 2003. However, they didn't agree on whether there were rewards for intentionally injuring players. Coy Wire, a safety during Williams' tenure, said that Williams gave bonuses for hits that left opponents seriously injured, and two other players said that bonuses were also awarded for "knockouts". However, linebacker Eddie Robinson, who played for Williams in Houston and Tennessee as well as in Buffalo, acknowledged an incentive pool but said he never heard Williams favor deliberately injuring other players. Ruben Brown, a guard for the Bills during Williams's time as coach there, denied there was any sort of bounty system in place in Buffalo, a position reiterated by linebacker London Fletcher and then-general manager Tom Donahoe. Chidi Ahanotu, who played one year under Williams in Buffalo, indicated that such a program was not within his character at the time and that Williams was "the softest coach I've been around."

Former NFL coach Tony Dungy later told Profootballtalk.com he was certain that Williams operated a similar bounty system while he was defensive coordinator of the Oilers/Titans from 1997 to 2000. He also believed that Williams put a bounty on Indianapolis Colts quarterback Peyton Manning during Super Bowl XLIV, and targeted Manning on several occasions while with the Titans. The revelation of the bounty system also caused renewed speculation about a 2006 game between the Redskins and Colts, in which Manning was knocked down by a high-low hit from the Redskins' Phillip Daniels and Andre Carter and appeared to lose some feeling in his neck. While Dungy did not speculate at the time about whether the Redskins targeted Manning on that play, he believed that hit eventually caused the neck problems that sidelined Manning for the entire 2011 season and led to his departure for the Denver Broncos afterward.

Former safety Ryan Clark, who played under Williams in Washington from 2004 to 2005 and himself was fined by the NFL $40,000 for a helmet-to-helmet hit against Baltimore Ravens tight end Ed Dickson during the 2011 season, defended Williams, saying that he never ran a bounty program with the Redskins and never saw one during his time in the NFL. Clark added that he would have reported Williams or any coach that offered to run such a program. The Steelers released a statement on their official website mentioning that the team did not condone any sort of bounty program.

== Fallout ==
Williams, who left after the season to become defensive coordinator of the St. Louis Rams, was summoned to NFL headquarters after the investigation concluded in mid-February. He initially denied any involvement, but recanted and admitted everything in a meeting with Goodell. After the story broke, Williams issued a statement calling his involvement "a terrible mistake". Williams said that he knew all along the slush fund broke the rules, and that "I should have stopped it" rather than get further involved. Goodell said in a statement that he found it "particularly disturbing" that the Saints were deliberately trying to injure other players. He said that players and coaches involved in the scheme would face fines or suspensions, along with the Saints forfeiting picks in the 2012 NFL draft and future drafts.

Benson issued a statement on the Saints' Website saying, "I have been made aware of the NFL's findings relative to the "Bounty Rule" and how it relates to our club. I have offered and the NFL has received our full cooperation in their investigation. While the findings may be troubling, we look forward to putting this behind us and winning more championships in the future for our fans."

On March 3, Fox Sports' Jay Glazer reported that the NFL intended to hand down penalties before the owners' meeting in late March. The NFLPA asked the league to delay any sanctions until the union could conduct its own investigation.

CBSSports.com's Pat Kirwan tweeted that within hours of the NFL releasing its report, lawyers for several players were already telling him that their clients were considering legal action against the Saints and Williams. Former San Francisco 49ers quarterback Steve Young, who has a law degree from BYU, suggested that anyone who had been injured during a Saints game during the scheme's existence had grounds for a lawsuit. Louisiana State University law professor William Corbett told Fox Sports that any legal action by players has a chance of succeeding. He cited a 1977 case in which Denver Broncos defensive back Dale Hackbart sued the Cincinnati Bengals for a late hit to the back by running back Boobie Clark that fractured three vertebrae four years earlier and ended his career. A Colorado court ruled against Hackbart, saying violence was part of the game. However, the 10th Circuit Court of Appeals disagreed, saying that "the general customs of football" do not include deliberately attempting to injure opposing players.

On March 6, Payton and Loomis issued a statement taking "full responsibility" for not stopping the alleged "bounty" program. Payton and Loomis also apologized to Benson and the Saints fans, and promised that such behavior would never happen again. Three days later, Drew Brees, the starting quarterback for the Saints, issued a statement, denying any knowledge of or involvement in the program and stated he had "yet to personally see any evidence that would substantiate these allegations". On March 12, WWL-TV in New Orleans reported that Payton and Benson met with Goodell in New York for much of the morning to reiterate that the Saints would continue to cooperate fully with the NFL's investigation. On March 22, U.S. Senator Richard Durbin of Illinois announced he would invite Goodell and the heads of the other major American sports leagues to a hearing on bounty systems. He also said that unless the leagues themselves "come up with standards to make sure this isn't going to happen again," he would consider drafting legislation that would extend federal sports bribery laws to cover bounties.

On April 5, documentary filmmaker Sean Pamphilon released audio of a meeting Williams held with his defense before their 2012 divisional playoff game against the San Francisco 49ers. In a profanity-laced speech, Williams instructed his players to deliberately try to injure several 49ers players. He ordered his men to try to knock out running back Kendall Hunter, even if it meant hitting him out of bounds. He specifically directed them to try to tear wide receiver Michael Crabtree's ACL, injure tight end Vernon Davis' ankles, and go after kick returner Kyle Williams specifically because he had a history of concussions. He also appeared to put a bounty on quarterback Alex Smith; according to Pamphilon, after Williams told his players to hit Smith in the chin, "then he rubs his thumb against his index and middle fingers—the cash sign—and says, I got the first one. I got the first one. Go get it. Go lay that motherfucker out." Pamphilon, who was doing a documentary on Steve Gleason and his fight against Lou Gehrig's Disease, released the audio to Yahoo! Sports without Gleason's approval. However, the Saints were not penalized for illegal hits during that game, which they lost 36–32.

== Sanctions ==
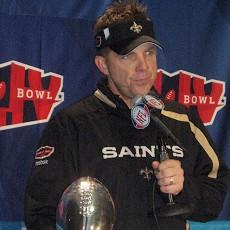
Sean Payton became the first NFL head coach in the Super Bowl era to be suspended by the league for any reason.

=== Coaches and front office staff ===
On March 21, 2012, the NFL issued sanctions to Saints coaches and front-office personnel for their roles in the scandal.

- Williams was suspended indefinitely, and was banned from applying for reinstatement until the end of the 2012 season at the earliest.
- Payton was suspended for the entire 2012 season, effective April 1.
- Loomis was suspended for the first eight games of the 2012 season.
- Vitt, who had been tabbed as a possible candidate to serve as interim coach in Payton's absence, was suspended for the first six games of the 2012 season. (This did not automatically disqualify Vitt from serving as interim head coach per se, as his suspension was not effective until the regular season; the suspension terms allowed him to coach the team through training camp and the preseason, then return during Week 7. The Saints announced they would implement this scenario for 2012.)

The Saints were also fined $500,000, which was the maximum fine permitted under the league's constitution. In addition, the Saints had to forfeit their second-round draft picks in 2012 and 2013 (their first-round pick in 2012 had already been traded to the New England Patriots, and therefore could not be forfeited; after the penalty, the Saints' first pick in the 2012 NFL draft was a third-rounder). Goodell also gave the league's clubs until March 30, 2012 to certify in writing that they did not have bounty programs. Teams were also be required to certify that no bounty systems existed as part of the yearly certifications, as per the league's Integrity of the Game Policy.

In a statement, Goodell said that the NFL would never tolerate "conduct or a culture" that put player safety at risk. He also said that the fact that the scheme went on for three years demanded that "a strong and lasting message must be sent that such conduct is totally unacceptable and has no place in the game." He was particularly upset that those involved had lied about the scheme on two separate investigations, and had denied that there was ever a bounty program in place. In an interview with NFL Network's Rich Eisen, Goodell said that the threat to player safety, as well as the fact the Saints lied about it, demanded significant punishment. "I don't think you can be too hard on people that put at risk our players' health and safety," Goodell told Eisen. He reiterated this in an interview later that day with ESPN's Adam Schefter, saying that the fact those involved "continued to mislead" the league about it was a significant factor in the sanctions. "You have to be accountable and responsible in the NFL," Goodell said. He also implied that Payton would have faced significant punishment in any event, since his contractual obligation to supervise his assistants meant that he at least should have known about the scheme. Goodell added that there would be zero tolerance of payments for in-game performance in the future, saying that payments for good play eventually escalate to bounties for deliberately injuring players. Later, Schefter said on ESPN's SportsCenter that league officials felt Payton was at least as guilty as Williams, despite initial focus on Williams's role as the mastermind in the scheme.

On March 30, Payton, Vitt and Loomis appealed their suspensions, and the Saints also appealed the fine and forfeiture of draft picks. Payton, Vitt, and Loomis met with Goodell on April 5. After that meeting, Vitt's lawyer David Cornwell, said that Payton and Loomis met with Williams before the divisional playoff game and ordered him to shut down the bounty program immediately. Cornwell contended that Williams was a "rogue coach", and the recently released audio of his meeting with the defense only proved it.

Goodell rejected the appeals on April 9, meaning that Payton's suspension began as of April 16. However, depending on the Saints' cooperation and that of the individuals involved, Goodell would have restored the Saints' second-round pick in 2013 (though the Saints would still lose a lower-round pick), as well as reduce the fine on the Saints and restore Payton, Vitt and Loomis's lost pay. However, all appeals were rejected.

=== Players ===
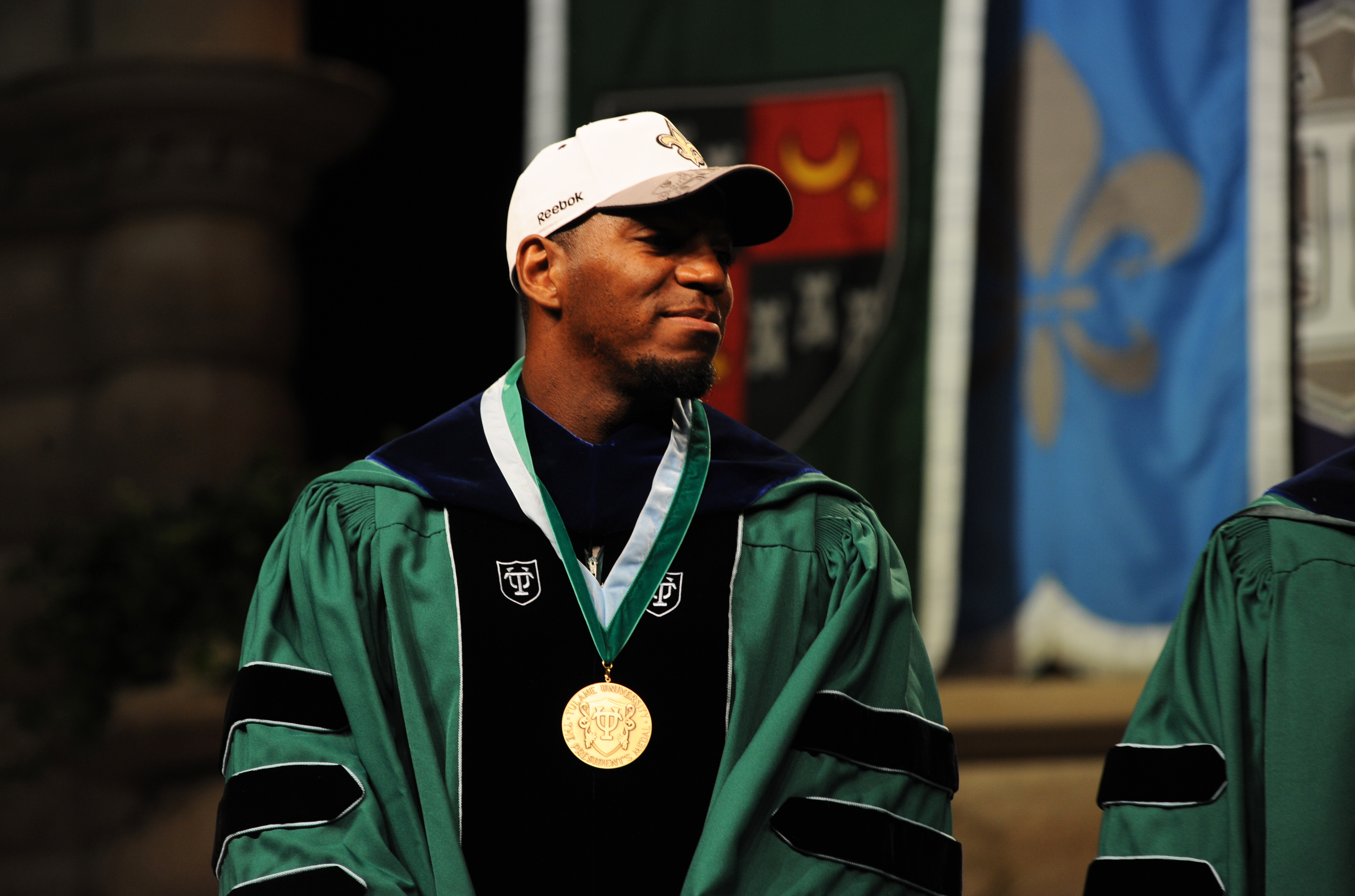
Jonathan Vilma was suspended for the entire 2012 season, but this would later be overturned on appeal.

The NFLPA requested the league to hold off on any punishments for the players until it conducts its own investigation. Goodell told Schefter, however, that he would hand down punishments to the players involved very soon once he received feedback from the NFLPA.

On May 2, 2012, the NFL suspended four then-current or former Saints players for their involvement in the bounty scandal:

- Vilma was suspended for the entire 2012 NFL season.
- Former Saints defensive tackle Anthony Hargrove was suspended for eight games.
- Saints defensive end Will Smith was suspended for four games.
- Former Saints linebacker Scott Fujita was suspended for three games.

Vilma's suspension took effect immediately, while the other three players were allowed to attend training camp. In announcing the suspensions, Goodell said that while a large number of players took part in the program, he chose to suspend those players who "were in leadership positions at the Saints; contributed a particularly large sum of money toward the program; specifically contributed to a bounty on an opposing player; demonstrated a clear intent to participate in a program that potentially injured opposing players; sought rewards for doing so; and/or obstructed the 2010 investigation." The NFL determined that Vilma and Smith helped Williams start the bounty program. The NFL determined that Hargrove lied to league officials during the 2010 investigation and that he told at least one other player, including Vikings defensive lineman Jimmy Kennedy, that the Saints had put a bounty on Favre in the 2009 NFC Championship game. However, both Hargrove and Kennedy denied that any such conversation took place, and it was later determined that it was "unclear exactly what NFL investigators asked Hargrove" during the 2010 investigation. The NFL initially claimed that Fujita, who left the team for the Cleveland Browns immediately after the Saints won Super Bowl XLIV, pledged "a significant amount of money" into the bounty program, but later determined that Fujita in fact had not pledged any money into the alleged bounty program.

Earlier, Goodell had indicated that he was going to come down hard on the players involved, telling Eisen that they "enthusiastically embraced" the scheme. "They are on the field, so I don't think they are absolved from any responsibility because of that," he said.

The NFLPA released a statement calling the suspensions unjustified, claiming that Goodell had not furnished them with any evidence supporting the sanctions. The union lodged a formal grievance on May 4, contending that since the suspensions were for on-field misconduct, the players' appeals should be heard by Ted Cottrell and Art Shell, whom the collective bargaining agreement designates as the hearing officers for on-field sanctions. It also contended that since the alleged conduct took place before the most recent CBA was signed in August, Goodell should have deferred to NFL special master Stephen Burbank in ruling on the players' actions. Goodell issued the suspensions as part of his power to sanction any "conduct detrimental to the integrity and public confidence in the NFL," a violation of Article 46 of the CBA. This provision is normally used to sanction off-field conduct. However, a league source told CBSSports.com's Clark Judge that it also gives Goodell the power to rule on in-game conduct if he feels that it runs counter to the integrity of the game.

All four players appealed their suspensions. On September 7, 2012, the Burbank appeals panel vacated the suspensions imposed on the four, and the NFL confirmed that the ruling reinstated them in time for their first games of the 2012 season two days later. Two days after the fifth game of the season, on October 9, 2012, the league re-issued the suspensions without any changes or reductions; the players' appeals continued.

On October 27, 2012, former league commissioner Paul Tagliabue postponed the bounty appeals hearing, expecting to set a new schedule on October 29, 2012. On December 11, with three games left in the regular season, Tagliabue vacated the players' suspensions, saying in his ruling, "I affirm Commissioner Goodell's factual findings as to the four players. I conclude that Hargrove, Smith and Vilma—but not Fujita—engaged in conduct detrimental to the integrity of, and public confidence in, the game of professional football ..." He laid primary responsibility for the scandal on Williams and Payton.

Had the suspensions of Vilma and Hargrove been upheld, they would have been the longest for an on-field incident in the Super Bowl era, surpassing the previous record set in 2006, when then-Titans defensive end Albert Haynesworth was given a five-game suspension for stomping on the head of Dallas Cowboys center Andre Gurode. In vacating Hargrove's suspension, Tagliabue described the seven-game suspension Goodell had levied on Hargrove as "unprecedented and unwarranted".

Vilma played the final 11 games of the 2012 season for the Saints; Smith played all 16. Fujita played the first four games of the season for the Browns before suffering a season-ending neck injury. Hargrove, signed as a free agent by the Green Bay Packers in March 2012, but was released before the 2012 regular season began.

== Media reaction ==
The behavior detailed in the report was almost universally condemned in the press. In an editorial, New Orleans' local paper The Times-Picayune called the revelations "an embarrassment for one of the most successful and beloved sports organizations of recent years," and that they were "particularly hard to take for (Saints') fans" in light of the Saints' rebound after Hurricane Katrina. ESPN columnist Gregg Easterbrook claimed that the Saints' behavior threatened the very integrity of the sport since high school and youth players have long emulated what they see in the NFL. He also claimed that NFL Network yanked its planned replay of the 2009 NFC Championship Game due to concern that fans might look more closely for late hits that should have been called.

Most of the players who were the targets of questionable hits by the Saints, including Favre and Warner, claimed that the bounties were merely part of the game. However, several former players interviewed by Sports Illustrated said that while payments for good hits and sacks were indeed considered part of the game, bounties for intentionally injuring opponents violated an unwritten code. One of those interviewed, Junior Seau, bluntly said that such practices crossed the line into threatening a person's livelihood. (Seau would commit suicide less than two months after the interview was published; it was discovered after his death that he suffered from chronic traumatic encephalopathy (CTE) as a result of the numerous head injuries Seau suffered during his 20-year NFL career.) Seau's sentiments were echoed by Hall of Fame quarterback Fran Tarkenton. In an op-ed for The Wall Street Journal, Tarkenton wrote that he played against the likes of Mean Joe Greene, Ray Nitschke and Dick Butkus, and none of them even considered deliberately trying to hurt him. He also said that he discussed the issue with several players from his era, and they unanimously agreed that players who put bounties on opponents were "cowards".

Hours after the sanctions were announced, Kluwe went on KSTP in the Twin Cities and demanded that any players involved in the scheme should be severely punished, and that the NFLPA let it be known that "there's no place in the league for that kind of behavior." He even went as far as to call for Vilma—the only player specifically named as being involved in the scheme in the NFL's initial announcements—to be banned from the league for life. His sentiments were echoed a day later by Vikings center John Sullivan, who told KFXN-FM in the Twin Cities that any Saint who deliberately tried to injure Favre in that game should receive a lifetime ban. Sullivan called the Saints' treatment of Favre "despicable" and "the exact opposite of sportsmanship", and even called for the league to take some sort of action against players involved in that game who had since retired, such as McCray. Kevin Seifert, who blogs on the NFC North for ESPN.com, wrote that neither he nor most Vikings fans were surprised at the discovery of the bounty program. Seifert argued that even before the findings were revealed, it was obvious that the Saints were determined to inflict a severe beating on Favre, even if it meant breaking the rules. The only difference in Seifert's mind was that he no longer believed the Saints were out of control. Rather, he wrote, they were acting as "part of a larger mentality" instilled by Williams.

Speculation quickly abounded about how severely Goodell, who had made player safety and the overall integrity of the game a point of emphasis during his tenure as the commissioner of the NFL, would punish Williams and the Saints. In his weekly "Monday Morning Quarterback" column on March 5, SI's Peter King wrote that he believed Williams faced at least an eight-game suspension, and that Payton and Loomis would almost certainly be suspended as well. He also argued that Goodell would have no choice but to come down hard on the Saints, given that the league was facing numerous lawsuits brought by former players who suffered repeated head injuries. Given the circumstances, King said, Goodell had a lot of incentive to "issue a string of suspensions the likes of which the league has never seen." In an article written for the March 12 edition of SI, King wrote that league officials were so outraged that they were likely to hand down penalties similar to the season-long bans Paul Hornung and Alex Karras received in 1963 for gambling. Freeman wrote that his sources in the league office had told him that the players, Williams, Payton and Loomis would all face suspensions of at least six games, as well as hefty fines. Freeman's sources also said that Payton's sanctions were likely to dwarf those handed down to the New England Patriots' Bill Belichick in the wake of the 2007 "Spygate" affair. He also believed that Goodell was going to use the scandal to "end the practice of bounty football forever," much like the penalties imposed against the Patriots after "Spygate" effectively ended the longstanding practice of illicit videotaping.

After the sanctions were announced, CBSSports.com's Gregg Doyel wrote that the severity of the punishments handed down to Williams, Payton and Loomis proved that Goodell was truly sincere in his desire to "take the thuggishness out of the NFL." Doyel also said that while many players had chafed at what they saw as Goodell's heavy-handed approach to discipline, he was actually standing up for their safety in the Saints' case. Pereira, now an analyst for Fox Sports, wrote that based on his experience in the league office, he wasn't surprised that Goodell came down hard on the Saints. He recalled that Goodell was always upset when officials didn't penalize hits on defenseless players.

The revelation of Williams' pregame speech was also greeted with revulsion. ESPN NFL analyst and former Dallas Cowboys safety Darren Woodson said that much of Williams' speech was standard pregame rhetoric. According to Woodson, when Williams called for his men to "attack the head" of running back Frank Gore, he was saying that the 49ers' offense would be rendered ineffective if they managed to shut Gore down. However, Woodson felt that several parts of Williams' speech—particularly his calls to go after Crabtree's ACL and target Williams specifically because he had concussions in the past—went too far. His former teammate, NFL Network analyst Michael Irvin, said that he "almost threw up" when he heard Williams tell his men to go after Crabtree's ACL, saying that players are taught from youth football onward to "never take out a man's knees." Fox Sports' Mark Kriegel argued that the tape proved Williams was "woefully underpunished", especially since he made the speech after being alerted that the NFL had reopened its investigation. He called for Goodell to ban him from the league for life.

NFL Network analyst Michael Lombardi wrote that the scandal happened in part because during Williams' previous stops as a defensive coordinator, the head coaches under whom he worked—Fisher, Joe Gibbs and Payton—essentially ceded him complete authority over the defense. Lombardi claimed that as a result, Williams operated essentially as "an independent contractor". Lombardi argued that such a situation is "never fully sustainable", as it can easily lead to the head coach losing control.

An opinion piece in the Los Angeles Times argued that Saints players did not actually pursue the bounties, based on the fact that, during the three-year period in which the bounty program was said to have been operating, the Saints caused the second fewest reported injuries to other players out of all 32 NFL teams. Specifically, in 2009 and 2011, the Saints injured the third fewest, and in 2010, the fifteenth fewest. The article speculated that Saints players "admirably ignored" their coaches' bounty orders.

== Aftermath ==
The suspension of Sean Payton, combined with the distractions caused by the scandal, proved too much for the Saints to overcome for the 2012 season. After finishing 13–3 and reaching the Divisional Round of the playoffs a year earlier, the Saints finished the season 7–9 and missed the playoffs. In addition, their overall defense that season was ranked the worst, permitting over 7,000 yards by opposing offenses in 16 games. Payton would eventually be reinstated by the NFL on January 22, 2013, and returned as head coach of the Saints. He remained in that position with the team until the 2021 season, though he would never again lead them to the Super Bowl.

Jonathan Vilma and Will Smith would spend the 2013 season with the Saints, but both were released at season's end. Vilma retired afterwards, while Smith briefly spent time on the New England Patriots practice squad. Scott Fujita suffered what turned out to be a career-ending neck injury while on the Browns; he would sign a ceremonial one-day contract with the Saints in the offseason and retire with the team. Anthony Hargrove signed with the Dallas Cowboys for the 2013 season, but was released before the season started and would not find another team.

Gregg Williams was reinstated by the NFL on February 7, 2013, and officially hired by the Tennessee Titans as a senior assistant defensive coach, and then the season after, he was hired again as defensive coordinator for the Rams. He would return to New Orleans to face his former team on November 27, 2016. The Saints put up 555 yards against Williams' defense in a 49–21 blowout win over the Rams; some opined that the Saints ran up the score to spite Williams for his role in Bountygate.

== See also ==
- Bounty Bowl, a 1989 bounty scandal
- 2007 National Football League videotaping controversy
- Deflategate
- Houston Astros sign stealing scandal
- List of scandals with "-gate" suffix
- National Football League controversies
