= Paul Allen (sports commentator) =

American sports commentator

- Born: January 6, 1966 (age 60); Washington, D.C.
- Sports commentary career
- Team: Minnesota Vikings (2002–present)
- Genre: Play-by-play
- Sport: NFL football
- Employer: KFAN (1998–present)

Paul Allen (born January 6, 1966) is an American sports commentator who has called play-by-play for the Minnesota Vikings since 2002. He is the voice of the Minnesota Vikings Radio Network and for horse racing at Canterbury Park. Allen has worked for Twin Cities radio station KFXN, where he currently hosts a morning sports radio show, since 1998.

== Biography ==
Allen was born in Washington, D.C., and took an interest in announcing from listening to Howard Cosell on Monday Night Football. After his parents divorced, he and his mother moved to Los Angeles in 1979. He attended Pasadena City College, where he was the editor-in-chief of the school newspaper, then wrote for the Pasadena Star-News and USA Today before he "got fed up with newspapers." He called horse races at different locations throughout the United States until he came to Canterbury Park in Shakopee, Minnesota in 1995.

In 2002, a year after unsuccessfully auditioning for the role, he became the Vikings' play-by-play announcer.

== Announcing style and reception ==
Allen has been praised for his enthusiasm while garnering criticism for being biased toward the Vikings. He defended his style as being "all in with this team" by channeling all of his emotions, positive or negative.

During his first game in 2002, he inadvertently ripped his microphone cords out of the outlet while celebrating a fumble recovery, causing the broadcast to briefly go offline. The following year, as the Arizona Cardinals scored the game-winning touchdown to eliminate the Vikings from playoff contention, Allen's call consisted of him shouting, "Nooooo! Nooooo! [...] There are Minnesota Vikings crying on the field!"; NFL.com listed the reaction as the greatest call in league history in 2012. When the Vikings lost to the Cardinals on Greg Joseph's missed field goal in 2021, Allen let out an enthusiastic "Joseph, c'mon! It is gooooood!" before adding "No, he missed it!" upon realizing the kick had gone wide right. Blair Walsh's missed game-winning field goal in the 2015–16 wild card game saw Allen exclaim, "Are you kidding me? The season can't end like that!", though he tweeted afterward it was one of the "most memorable" games he has called.

In the 2009 NFC Championship, Vikings quarterback Brett Favre threw a late interception that ultimately kept them out of Super Bowl XLIV. In response, Allen questioned, "Why do you even ponder passing? I mean, you can take a knee and try a 56-yard field goal. This is not Detroit, man, this is the Super Bowl!" Allen was both criticized and praised by Vikings fans for "ripping into" Favre, while Allen stressed afterward that he was not criticizing him. He was not admonished for the call as management "knew what I was saying was from the heart."

His call of the Vikings' 33–30 win over the Buffalo Bills in 2022 was widely commended. NBA player LeBron James called Allen a "national treasure", while Pat McAfee lauded Allen for his "passion" and "storytelling".

== Controversies ==
On January 23, 2026, during the "ICE Out of Minnesota" general strike, a demonstration that drew tens of thousands of participants to downtown Minneapolis despite subzero temperatures, Allen drew criticism for remarks made on his KFAN radio show. During the broadcast, Allen questioned whether those marching in the -24 °C (-10 °F) conditions were "paid protesters" and if they received "hazard pay". Later in the same program, while discussing players "catching strays", he remarked that "paid protesters caught one out of nowhere this morning".

The comments were described by the Pioneer Press as insensitive and mocking toward victims of local violence, particularly given the fatal shootings of Renée Good and Alex Pretti involving federal agents that had occurred in the city earlier that month. Following public backlash and calls for his removal by community members, Allen issued an apology on social media, stating: "I have to stop watching all this for a little bit. I'm so sad this terror is happening all around us here in MN. I just prayed to God's will for it to somehow stop and now and started crying. And no more cheap one-liners from me." KFAN also deleted the audio from Allen's show. On February 2, 2026, Allen returned to his radio show after a one-week absence and reiterated his apology.
