= 2016 Carolina Panthers season =

22nd season in franchise history

- Owner: Jerry Richardson
- General manager: Dave Gettleman
- Head coach: Ron Rivera
- Home stadium: Bank of America Stadium

Results
- Record: 6–10
- Division place: 4th NFC South
- Playoffs: Did not qualify
- All-Pros: 2: TE Greg Olsen (2nd team); LB Luke Kuechly (2nd team)
- Pro Bowlers: 5: LB Thomas Davis; LB Luke Kuechly; TE Greg Olsen; FB Mike Tolbert; G Trai Turner

Uniform
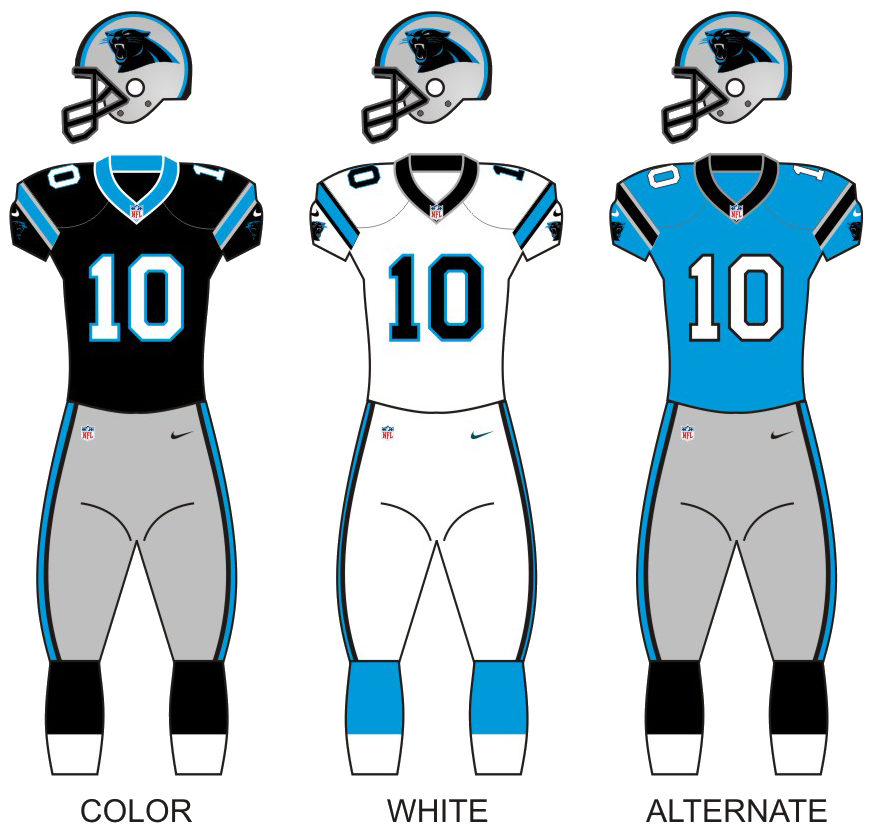

The 2016 season was the Carolina Panthers' 22nd in the National Football League (NFL) and their sixth under head coach Ron Rivera. It was also the team's 21st season at Bank of America Stadium. The previous year, the Panthers achieved their highest win total in franchise history with a 15–1 record, but lost to the Denver Broncos in Super Bowl 50. They entered the 2016 season as the defending NFC champions and NFC South champions.

After a 1–5 start, their worst start since 2012, the Panthers finished the season at 6–10, missing the playoffs for the first time since 2012. The Panthers struggled throughout the season with injuries and loss of star players via free agency and retirement. The Panthers became the first team in NFL history to go 15–1 and miss the playoffs the following year and the first Super Bowl runners up to miss the next year's playoffs since the 2008 Patriots. They also failed to win the NFC South for the first time in three seasons. This was also the first team to have at least 15 wins and finish last in their division the following season. They were eliminated from playoff contention in Week 16 when they lost to the Atlanta Falcons 33-16.

== Offseason ==
The Panthers had the most explosive offense in the NFL in the regular season, despite having subpar tackle play. The team did not add any tackles in free agency though, with left tackle Michael Oher instead getting a three-year contract extension worth $21.6 million with $9.5 million guaranteed. The Panthers also had top wide receiver Kelvin Benjamin, who missed the entire 2015 season due to an ACL tear, returning from injury.

Another significant change in the off-season was the departure of starting cornerback Josh Norman. Norman was named First-team All-Pro in 2015 after allowing the lowest passer rating when targeted among NFL cornerbacks. The Panthers drafted corners James Bradberry, Daryl Worley and Zack Sanchez to compensate for the loss. The team also lost Dwan Edwards, a rotational defensive tackle, in free agency and veteran defensive end Jared Allen to retirement. They drafted defensive lineman Vernon Butler in the first round to add more talent to that position group.

== Draft ==
2016 Carolina Panthers Draft
Round	Selection	Player	Position	College
1	30	Vernon Butler	DT	Louisiana Tech
2	62	James Bradberry	CB	Samford
3	77	Daryl Worley	CB	West Virginia
5	141	Zack Sanchez	CB	Oklahoma
7	252	Beau Sandland	TE	Montana State

Notes

- The Panthers traded a conditional sixth-round selection to the Chicago Bears in exchange for defensive end Jared Allen.

== Staff ==
2016 Carolina Panthers staff
Front office: Owner/founder – Jerry Richardson; President – Danny Morrison; General manager – Dave Gettleman; Assistant general manager – Brandon Beane; Director of player personnel – Don Gregory; Director of team administration – Rob Rogers; Director of pro scouting – Mark Koncz; Director of college scouting – Eric Stokes; Assistant director of college scouting – Jeff Morrow; National scout – Mike Szabo; Football operations manager – Bryan Porter; Football operations assistant – Matt Allen; Football operations assistant – Mike Anderson; Football operations assistant – Matt Worswick; Director of player development – Mark Carrier; Executive assistant to the head coach – Linda O'Hora; Head coaches: Head coach – Ron Rivera; Assistant head coach/secondary – Steve Wilks; Offensive coaches: Offensive coordinator – Mike Shula; Quarterbacks – Ken Dorsey; Running backs – Jim Skipper; Wide receivers – Ricky Proehl; Assistant wide receivers – Cameron Turner; Tight ends – Pete Hoener; Running game coordinator – John Matsko; Assistant offensive line – Ray Brown	Defensive coaches: Defensive coordinator – Sean McDermott; Defensive line – Eric Washington; Assistant defensive line – Sam Mills III; Linebackers – Al Holcomb; Assistant defensive backs/nickelbacks – Curtis Fuller; Assistant defensive backs/safeties – Richard Rodgers; Special teams coaches: Special teams coordinator – Bruce DeHaven; Assistant special teams – Chase Blackburn; Assistant special teams – Thomas McGaughey; Strength and conditioning: Strength and conditioning – Joe Kenn; Assistant strength and conditioning – Jason Benguche

== Final roster ==
2016 Carolina Panthers roster
Quarterbacks (QB): 3 Derek Anderson; 1 Cam Newton; Running backs (RB): 34 Cameron Artis-Payne; 28 Jonathan Stewart; 35 Mike Tolbert FB; 43 Fozzy Whittaker; Wide receivers (WR): 13 Kelvin Benjamin; 11 Brenton Bersin; 10 Corey Brown; 18 Damiere Byrd; 19 Ted Ginn Jr.; 14 Joe Webb; Tight ends (TE): 84 Ed Dickson; 82 Chris Manhertz; 88 Greg Olsen	Offensive linemen (OL): 71 Dan France T; 69 Tyler Larsen C; 68 Andrew Norwell LG; 74 Mike Remmers T; 79 Chris Scott G/T; 70 Trai Turner G/T; 62 Ryan Wendell C; 60 Daryl Williams T; 61 David Yankey G; Defensive linemen (DL): 97 Mario Addison DE; 92 Vernon Butler DT; 94 Kony Ealy DE; 96 Wes Horton DE; 95 Charles Johnson DE; 98 Star Lotulelei DT; 77 Kyle Love DT/DE; 99 Kawann Short DT; 90 Paul Soliai DT/DE; 75 Larry Webster DE	Linebackers (LB): 57 Jeremy Cash OLB; 58 Thomas Davis OLB; 53 Ben Jacobs OLB; 56 A. J. Klein; 59 Luke Kuechly MLB; 55 David Mayo MLB; 52 Jared Norris OLB; 54 Shaq Thompson OLB; Defensive backs (DB): 24 James Bradberry CB; 20 Kurt Coleman SS; 30 Travell Dixon SS; 22 Michael Griffin S; 23 Leonard Johnson CB; 42 Colin Jones FS; 26 Daryl Worley CB; 25 Lou Young CB; Special teams (ST): 9 Graham Gano K; 44 J. J. Jansen LS; 5 Michael Palardy P	Practice squad: 76 Blaine Clausell T; 72 Eric Crume DT (IR); 15 Keyarris Garrett WR; 32 Tyler Patmon CB; 38 Jalen Simmons RB; 80 Scott Simonson TE; 63 Pearce Slater T; 37 Dezmen Southward SS; 78 Tyrus Thompson T; 46 Eric Wallace TE; Reserve: 65 Chas Alecxih DT (IR); 33 Tre Boston FS (IR); 86 LaRon Byrd WR (IR); 91 Ryan Delaire DE (IR); 17 Devin Funchess WR (IR); 66 Gino Gradkowski C (IR); 47 Devon Johnson FB (IR); 67 Ryan Kalil C (IR); 8 Andy Lee P (IR); 29 Dean Marlowe SS (IR); 79 Michael Oher T (IR); 72 Jordan Rigsbee T (IR); 31 Zack Sanchez CB (IR); 21 Teddy Williams CB (IR); Rookies in italics 53 active, 15 reserve, 9 practice squad

== Schedule ==
=== Preseason ===
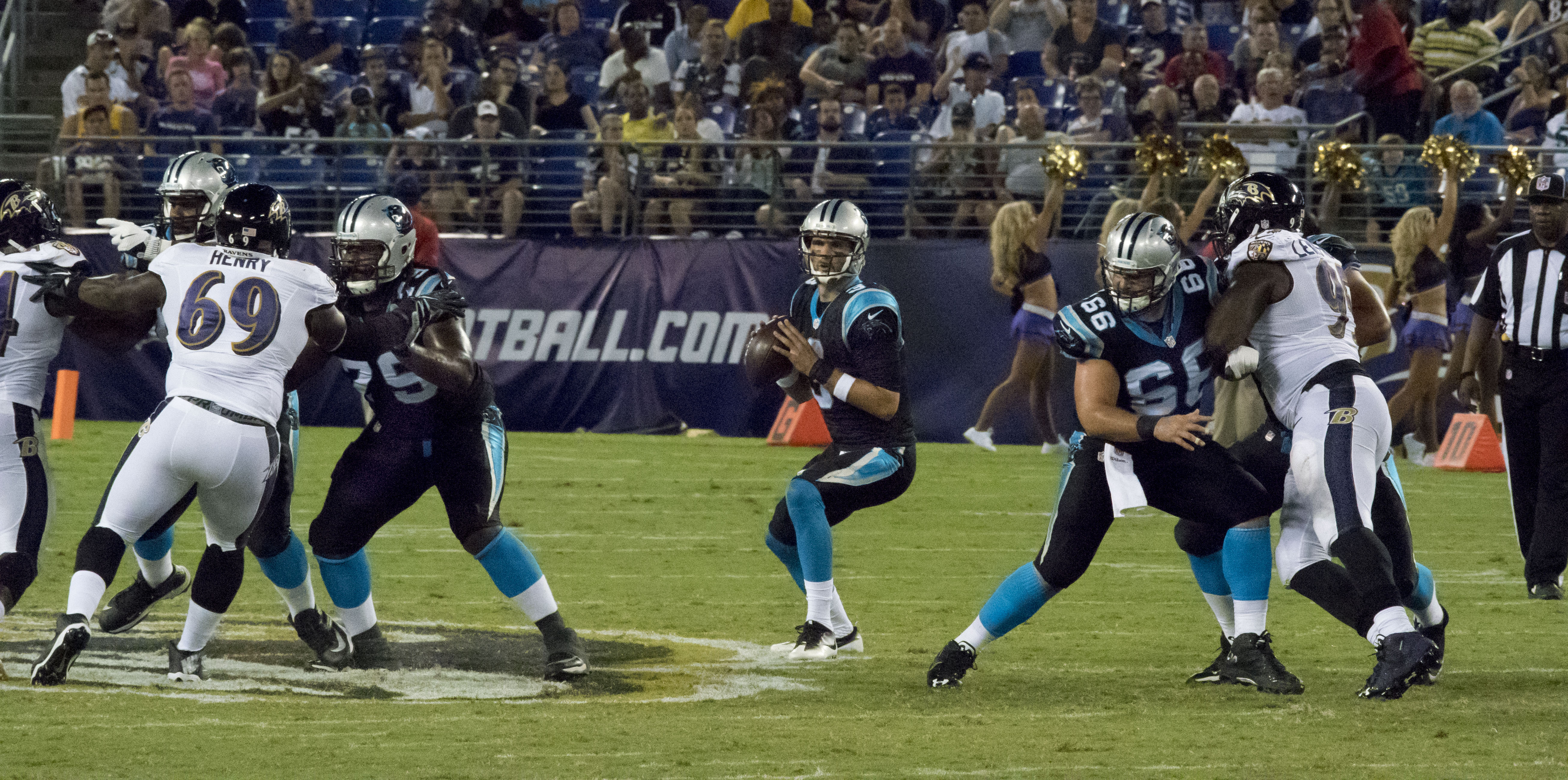
Panthers at the Ravens during the preseason

Week	Date	Opponent	Result	Record	Venue	Recap
1	August 11	at Baltimore Ravens	**L** 19–22	0–1	M&T Bank Stadium	Recap
2	August 20	at Tennessee Titans	**W** 26–16	1–1	Nissan Stadium	Recap
3	August 26	New England Patriots	**L** 17–19	1–2	Bank of America Stadium	Recap
4	September 1	Pittsburgh Steelers	**W** 18–6	2–2	Bank of America Stadium	Recap

=== Regular season ===
Week	Date	Opponent	Result	Record	Venue	Recap
1	September 8	at Denver Broncos	**L** 20–21	0–1	Sports Authority Field at Mile High	Recap
2	September 18	San Francisco 49ers	**W** 46–27	1–1	Bank of America Stadium	Recap
3	September 25	Minnesota Vikings	**L** 10–22	1–2	Bank of America Stadium	Recap
4	October 2	at **Atlanta Falcons**	**L** 33–48	1–3	Georgia Dome	Recap
5	October 10	**Tampa Bay Buccaneers**	**L** 14–17	1–4	Bank of America Stadium	Recap
6	October 16	at **New Orleans Saints**	**L** 38–41	1–5	Mercedes-Benz Superdome	Recap
7	Bye					
8	October 30	Arizona Cardinals	**W** 30–20	2–5	Bank of America Stadium	Recap
9	November 6	at Los Angeles Rams	**W** 13–10	3–5	Los Angeles Memorial Coliseum	Recap
10	November 13	Kansas City Chiefs	**L** 17–20	3–6	Bank of America Stadium	Recap
11	November 17	**New Orleans Saints**	**W** 23–20	4–6	Bank of America Stadium	Recap
12	November 27	at Oakland Raiders	**L** 32–35	4–7	Oakland Alameda Coliseum	Recap
13	December 4	at Seattle Seahawks	**L** 7–40	4–8	CenturyLink Field	Recap
14	December 11	San Diego Chargers	**W** 28–16	5–8	Bank of America Stadium	Recap
15	December 19	at Washington Redskins	**W** 26–15	6–8	FedExField	Recap
16	December 24	**Atlanta Falcons**	**L** 16–33	6–9	Bank of America Stadium	Recap
17	January 1	at **Tampa Bay Buccaneers**	**L** 16–17	6–10	Raymond James Stadium	Recap

Note: Intra-division opponents are in bold text.

=== Game summaries ===
==== Week 1: at Denver Broncos ====
NFL Kickoff game

Week One: Carolina Panthers at Denver Broncos – Game summary

Quarter	1	2	3	4	Total
Panthers	7	10	0	3	**20**
**Broncos**	0	7	0	14	**21**

at Sports Authority Field at Mile High, Denver, Colorado

- Date: September 8
- Game time: 8:30 p.m. EDT/6:30 p.m. MDT
- Game weather: 85 °F (29 °C), sunny and clear
- Game attendance: 76,843
- Referee: Gene Steratore
- TV announcers (NBC): Al Michaels, Cris Collinsworth and Michele Tafoya
- Recap, Gamebook

Game information

**First quarter**

- CAR – Kelvin Benjamin 14-yard pass from Cam Newton (Graham Gano kick), 7:13. Panthers 7–0. **Drive: 8 plays, 71 yards, 4:24.**

**Second quarter**

- DEN – Andy Janovich 28-yard run (Brandon McManus kick), 12:16. Tied 7–7. **Drive: 5 plays, 80 yards, 2:36.**
- CAR – Cam Newton 2-yard run (Graham Gano kick), 3:01. Panthers 14–7. **Drive: 18 plays, 89 yards, 9:15.**
- CAR – Graham Gano 44-yard field goal, 0:03. Panthers 17–7. **Drive: 7 plays, 52 yards, 1:42.**

**Third quarter**

- No scoring plays

**Fourth quarter**

- DEN – C. J. Anderson 25-yard pass from Trevor Siemian (Brandon McManus kick), 14:50. Panthers 17–14. **Drive: 8 plays, 78 yards, 4:08.**
- DEN – C. J. Anderson 1-yard run (Brandon McManus kick), 9:26. Broncos 21–17. **Drive: 10 plays, 23 yards, 4:41.**
- CAR – Graham Gano 36-yard field goal, 4:21. Broncos 21–20. **Drive: 10 plays, 57 yards, 5:05.**

**Top passers**

- CAR – Cam Newton – 18/33, 194 yards, TD, INT
- DEN – Trevor Siemian – 18/26, 178 yards, TD, 2 INT

**Top rushers**

- CAR – Jonathan Stewart – 15 rushes, 64 yards
- DEN – C. J. Anderson – 20 rushes, 92 yards, TD

**Top receivers**

- CAR – Kelvin Benjamin – 6 receptions, 91 yards, TD
- DEN – Emmanuel Sanders – 5 receptions, 49 yards

The Panthers were up 17–7 in the fourth quarter which saw the Broncos put up 14 points. Down 21–20, Graham Gano attempted a potential game winning 50 yard kick but the kick was wide left, handing the Panthers a 0–1 start to the season.

==== Week 2: vs. San Francisco 49ers ====
Week Two: San Francisco 49ers at Carolina Panthers – Game summary

Quarter	1	2	3	4	Total
49ers	3	7	0	17	**27**
**Panthers**	7	10	14	15	**46**

at Bank of America Stadium, Charlotte, North Carolina

- Date: September 18
- Game time: 1:00 p.m. EDT
- Game weather: 82 °F (28 °C) sunny
- Game attendance: 74,143
- Referee: John Parry
- TV announcers (Fox): Chris Myers, Ronde Barber and Jennifer Hale
- Recap Gamebook

Game information

**First quarter**

- SF – Phil Dawson 29-yard field goal, 11:21. 49ers 3–0. **Drive: 7 plays, 11 yards, 2:56.**
- CAR – Shaq Thompson 9-yard fumble return (Graham Gano kick), 4:04. Panthers 7–3.

**Second quarter**

- SF – Torrey Smith 28-yard pass from Blaine Gabbert (Phil Dawson kick), 10:02. 49ers 10–7. **Drive: 7 plays, 59 yards, 3:38.**
- CAR – Greg Olsen 78-yard pass from Cam Newton (Graham Gano kick), 9:40. Panthers 14–10. **Drive: 1 play, 78 yards, 0:22.**
- CAR – Graham Gano 39-yard field goal, 0:01. Panthers 17–10. **Drive: 6 plays, 33 yards, 0:41.**

**Third quarter**

- CAR – Kelvin Benjamin 10-yard pass from Cam Newton (Graham Gano kick), 8:38. Panthers 24–10. **Drive: 8 plays, 69 yards, 4:51.**
- CAR – Kelvin Benjamin 9-yard pass from Cam Newton (Graham Gano kick), 4:56. Panthers 31–10. **Drive: 6 plays, 75 yards, 2:54.**

**Fourth quarter**

- SF – Phil Dawson 39-yard field goal, 12:38. Panthers 31–13. **Drive: 4 plays, −4 yards, 1:23.**
- SF – Blaine Gabbert 1-yard run (Phil Dawson kick), 12:31. Panthers 31–20. **Drive: 1 play, 1 yard, 0:07.**
- CAR – Graham Gano 31-yard field goal, 8:07. Panthers 34–20. **Drive: 8 plays, 25 yards, 4:24.**
- SF – Vance McDonald 75-yard pass from Blaine Gabbert (Phil Dawson kick), 7:51. Panthers 34–27. **Drive: 2 plays, 75 yards, 0:16.**
- CAR – Graham Gano 49-yard field goal, 4:08. Panthers 37–27. **Drive: 9 plays, 40 yards, 3:43.**
- CAR – Devin Funchess 16-yard pass from Cam Newton (kick blocked), 3:31. Panthers 43–27. **Drive: 4 plays, 34 yards, 0:26.**
- CAR – Graham Gano 41-yard field goal, 1:06. Panthers 46–27. **Drive: 4 plays, 4 yards, 1:56.**

**Top passers**

- SF – Blaine Gabbert – 17/36, 243 yards, 2 TD, 2 INT
- CAR – Cam Newton – 24/40, 353 yards, 4 TD, INT

**Top rushers**

- SF – Carlos Hyde – 14 rushes, 34 yards
- CAR – Fozzy Whittaker – 16 rushes, 100 yards

**Top receivers**

- SF – Vance McDonald – 1 reception, 75 yards, TD
- CAR – Greg Olsen – 5 receptions, 122 yards, TD

In their home opener, the Panthers looked to win their first game of the season. Carolina went into the fourth quarter with a 21-point lead over the 49ers; with about eight minutes left in the game, San Francisco managed to get within seven of tying the game. Carolina ended up scoring three more times before the game finished and won 46–27, improving to 1–1 on the year.

==== Week 3: vs. Minnesota Vikings ====
Week Three: Minnesota Vikings at Carolina Panthers – Game summary

Quarter	1	2	3	4	Total
**Vikings**	2	6	8	6	**22**
Panthers	10	0	0	0	**10**

at Bank of America Stadium, Charlotte, North Carolina

- Date: September 25
- Game time: 1:00 p.m. EDT
- Game weather: 80 °F (27 °C), partly cloudy
- Game attendance: 73,813
- Referee: Jerome Boger
- TV announcers (Fox): Chris Myers, Ronde Barber and Jennifer Hale
- Recap, Gamebook

Game information

**First quarter**

- CAR – Graham Gano 48-yard field goal, 10:52. Panthers 3–0. **Drive: 7 plays, 48 yards, 4:08.**
- CAR – Cam Newton 3-yard run (Graham Gano kick), 5:20. Panthers 10–0. **Drive: 7 plays, 57 yards, 3:51.**
- MIN – Cam Newton sacked in the end zone by Danielle Hunter for a safety, 1:44. Panthers 10–2.

**Second quarter**

- MIN – Marcus Sherels 54-yard punt return (kick failed, wide right), 3:21. Panthers 10–8.

**Third quarter**

- MIN – Kyle Rudolph 15-yard pass from Sam Bradford (Jerick McKinnon run), 9:43. Vikings 16–10. **Drive: 10 plays, 79 yards, 5:17.**

**Fourth quarter**

- MIN – Blair Walsh 28-yard field goal, 13:14. Vikings 19–10. **Drive: 7 plays, 33 yards, 2:46.**
- MIN – Blair Walsh 31-yard field goal, 5:07. Vikings 22–10. **Drive: 11 plays, 49 yards, 5:55.**

**Top passers**

- MIN – Sam Bradford – 18/28, 171 yards, TD
- CAR – Cam Newton – 21/35, 262 yards, 3 INT

**Top rushers**

- MIN – Jerick McKinnon – 16 rushes, 45 yards
- CAR – Cameron Artis-Payne – 12 rushes, 47 yards

**Top receivers**

- MIN – Kyle Rudolph – 7 receptions, 70 yards, TD
- CAR – Greg Olsen – 6 receptions, 64 yards

The Panthers' fourteen home game winning streak came to an end after losing to Minnesota. They fell to 1–2 as Cam Newton was sacked eight times by the Minnesota defense and threw three picks.

==== Week 4: at Atlanta Falcons ====
Week Four: Carolina Panthers at Atlanta Falcons – Game summary

Quarter	1	2	3	4	Total
Panthers	0	10	0	23	**33**
**Falcons**	14	3	14	17	**48**

at Georgia Dome, Atlanta, Georgia

- Date: October 2
- Game time: 1:00 p.m. EDT
- Game weather: Played indoors (dome stadium)
- Game attendance: 70,508
- Referee: John Hussey
- TV announcers (Fox): Dick Stockton, Chris Spielman and Kristina Pink
- Recap, Gamebook

Game information

**First quarter**

- ATL – Jacob Tamme 4-yard pass from Matt Ryan (Matt Bryant kick), 7:14. Falcons 7–0. **Drive: 8 plays, 71 yards, 4:19.**
- ATL – Devonta Freeman 13-yard run (Matt Bryant kick), 0:17. Falcons 14–0. **Drive: 6 plays, 98 yards, 3:33.**

**Second quarter**

- CAR – Kurt Coleman 8-yard interception return (Graham Gano kick), 11:31. Falcons 14–7.
- ATL – Matt Bryant 28-yard field goal, 5:56. Falcons 17–7. **Drive: 10 plays, 65 yards, 5:35.**
- CAR – Graham Gano 54-yard field goal, 3:07. Falcons 17–10. **Drive: 6 plays, 39 yards, 2:49.**

**Third quarter**

- ATL – Austin Hooper 42-yard pass from Matt Ryan (Matt Bryant kick), 9:13. Falcons 24–10. **Drive: 10 plays, 99 yards, 5:47.**
- ATL – Aldrick Robinson 35-yard pass from Matt Ryan (Matt Bryant kick), 4:57. Falcons 31–10. **Drive: 9 plays, 92 yards, 3:19.**

**Fourth quarter**

- ATL – Matt Bryant 53-yard field goal, 13:19. Falcons 34–10. **Drive: 10 plays, 36 yards, 5:17.**
- CAR – Kelvin Benjamin 6-yard pass from Cam Newton (Cam Newton run), 11:42. Falcons 34–18. **Drive: 5 plays, 63 yards, 1:37.**
- CAR – Greg Olsen 14-yard pass from Derek Anderson (Derek Anderson–Greg Olsen pass), 3:58. Falcons 34–26. **Drive: 9 plays, 94 yards, 5:23.**
- ATL – Julio Jones 75-yard pass from Matt Ryan (Matt Bryant kick), 3:45. Falcons 41–26. **Drive: 1 play, 75 yards, 0:13.**
- CAR – Corey Brown 16-yard pass from Derek Anderson (Graham Gano kick), 1:53. Falcons 41–33. **Drive: 11 plays, 75 yards, 1:52.**
- ATL – Robert Alford 30-yard interception return (Matt Bryant kick), 1:14. Falcons 48–33.

**Top passers**

- CAR – Derek Anderson – 17/23, 172 yards, 2 TD, 2 INT
- ATL – Matt Ryan – 28/37, 503 yards, 4 TD, INT

**Top rushers**

- CAR – Cam Newton – 5 rushes, 30 yards
- ATL – Devonta Freeman – 13 rushes, 57 yards, TD

**Top receivers**

- CAR – Fozzy Whittaker – 9 receptions, 86 yards
- ATL – Julio Jones – 12 receptions, 300 yards, TD

It was not Carolina's day as the defense had a very hard time putting pressure on Matt Ryan, who threw for 500 yards and four touchdowns, one of them to Julio Jones, who had a monster game, catching 12 passes for 300 yards. It was another rough day for Newton, who left the game with a concussion in the fourth quarter, allowing backup QB Derek Anderson into action. Anderson threw both a pair of touchdowns and interceptions as the Panthers would drop to 1–3.

==== Week 5: vs. Tampa Bay Buccaneers ====
Week Five: Tampa Bay Buccaneers at Carolina Panthers – Game summary

Quarter	1	2	3	4	Total
**Buccaneers**	3	3	8	3	**17**
Panthers	0	0	14	0	**14**

at Bank of America Stadium, Charlotte, North Carolina

- Date: October 10
- Game time: 8:30 p.m. EDT
- Game weather: 66 °F (19 °C), clear
- Game attendance: 73,425
- Referee: Clete Blakeman
- TV announcers (ESPN): Sean McDonough, Jon Gruden and Lisa Salters
- Recap, Gamebook

Game information

**First quarter**

- TB – Roberto Aguayo 35-yard field goal, 6:32. Buccaneers 3–0. **Drive: 15 plays, 58 yards, 8:32.**

**Second quarter**

- TB – Roberto Aguayo 35-yard field goal, 0:48. Buccaneers 6–0. **Drive: 9 plays, 41 yards, 3:22.**

**Third quarter**

- CAR – Cameron Artis-Payne 1-yard run (Graham Gano kick), 9:12. Panthers 7–6. **Drive: 11 plays, 75 yards, 5:48.**
- CAR – Cameron Artis-Payne 12-yard run (Graham Gano kick), 6:11. Panthers 14–6. **Drive: 5 plays, 68 yards, 1:45.**
- TB – Mike Evans 26-yard pass from Jameis Winston (Jameis Winston–Adam Humphries pass), 4:34. Tied 14–14. **Drive: 4 plays, 75 yards, 1:36.**

**Fourth quarter**

- TB – Roberto Aguayo 38-yard field goal, 0:03. Buccaneers 17–14. **Drive: 11 plays, 66 yards, 1:49.**

**Top passers**

- TB – Jameis Winston – 18/30, 219 yards, TD
- CAR – Derek Anderson – 18/28, 278 yards, 2 INT

**Top rushers**

- TB – Jacquizz Rodgers – 30 rushes, 101 yards
- CAR – Cameron Artis-Payne – 18 rushes, 85 yards, 2 TD

**Top receivers**

- TB – Mike Evans – 6 receptions, 89 yards, TD
- CAR – Greg Olsen – 9 receptions, 181 yards

After being held scoreless in the first half, the Panthers scored two touchdowns in the third quarter. Tampa Bay followed up with a touchdown to tie the game. Late in the fourth quarter, the Buccaneers made a field goal to win 17–14. With the loss the Panthers fall to 1–4.

==== Week 6: at New Orleans Saints ====
Week Six: Carolina Panthers at New Orleans Saints – Game summary

Quarter	1	2	3	4	Total
Panthers	0	10	7	21	**38**
**Saints**	14	10	7	10	**41**

at Mercedes-Benz Superdome, New Orleans, Louisiana

- Date: October 16
- Game time: 1:00 p.m. EDT/12:00 p.m. CDT
- Game weather: Played indoors (dome stadium)
- Game attendance: 73,138
- Referee: Walt Anderson
- TV announcers (Fox): Sam Rosen, Daryl Johnston and Laura Okmin
- Recap, Gamebook

Game information

**First quarter**

- NO – Coby Fleener 2-yard run (Wil Lutz kick), 8:55. Saints 7–0. **Drive: 12 plays, 75 yards, 6:05.**
- NO – Brandin Cooks 87-yard pass from Drew Brees (Wil Lutz kick), 2:31. Saints 14–0. **Drive: 3 plays, 93 yards, 0:57.**

**Second quarter**

- NO – Michael Thomas 9-yard pass from Drew Brees (Wil Lutz kick), 13:47. Saints 21–0. **Drive: 4 plays, 29 yards, 1:48.**
- CAR – Graham Gano 42-yard field goal, 3:02. Saints 21–3. **Drive: 6 plays, 33 yards, 1:09.**
- CAR – Devin Funchess 17-yard pass from Cam Newton (Graham Gano kick), 1:15. Saints 21–10. **Drive: 5 plays, 63 yards, 1:09.**
- NO – Wil Lutz 33-yard field goal, 0:10. Saints 24–10. **Drive: 7 plays, 60 yards, 1:05.**

**Third quarter**

- CAR – Ed Dickson 1-yard pass from Cam Newton (Graham Gano kick), 6:49. Saints 24–17. **Drive: 12 plays, 60 yards, 4:57.**
- NO – Coby Fleener 50-yard pass from Drew Brees (Wil Lutz kick), 4:56. Saints 31–17. **Drive: 5 plays, 75 yards, 1:53.**

**Fourth quarter**

- CAR – Jonathan Stewart 2-yard run (Graham Gano kick), 14:49. Saints 31–24. **Drive: 3 plays, 50 yards, 1:04.**
- CAR – Jonathan Stewart 1-yard run (kick failed, wide right), 9:38. Saints 31–30. **Drive: 9 plays, 50 yards, 3:51.**
- NO – Josh Hill 8-yard pass from Drew Brees (Wil Lutz kick), 6:02. Saints 38–30. **Drive: 8 plays, 75 yards, 3:36.**
- CAR – Cam Newton 2-yard run (Cam Newton–Devin Funchess pass), 2:58. Tied 38–38. **Drive: 6 plays, 78 yards, 3:04.**
- NO – Wil Lutz 52-yard field goal, 0:11. Saints 41–38. **Drive: 11 plays, 41 yards, 2:47.**

**Top passers**

- CAR – Cam Newton – 27/47, 322 yards, 2 TD, INT
- NO – Drew Brees – 34/49, 465 yards, 4 TD, INT

**Top rushers**

- CAR – Jonathan Stewart – 19 rushes, 85 yards, 2 TD
- NO – Mark Ingram II – 16 rushes, 51 yards

**Top receivers**

- CAR – Greg Olsen – 6 receptions, 94 yards
- NO – Brandin Cooks – 7 receptions, 173 yards, TD

With Cam Newton returning from a concussion, the Panthers urged a late comeback and tied the game at 38–38, but New Orleans kicker Wil Lutz hit the gamewinner to seal the 41–38 victory for the Saints. With the loss the Panthers drop to 1–5, their worst record since 2012.

==== Week 7: Bye week ====
No game. Carolina had their bye week on Week 7.

==== Week 8: vs. Arizona Cardinals ====
Week Eight: Arizona Cardinals at Carolina Panthers – Game summary

Quarter	1	2	3	4	Total
Cardinals	0	7	7	6	**20**
**Panthers**	14	10	6	0	**30**

at Bank of America Stadium, Charlotte, North Carolina

- Date: October 30
- Game time: 1:00 p.m. EDT
- Game weather: 85 °F (29 °C), sunny
- Game attendance: 74,088
- Referee: Walt Coleman
- TV announcers (Fox): Sam Rosen, Daryl Johnston and Laura Okmin
- Recap, Gamebook

Game information

**First quarter**

- CAR – Thomas Davis 46-yard fumble return (Graham Gano kick), 11:48. Panthers 7–0.
- CAR – Jonathan Stewart 2-yard run (Graham Gano kick), 2:24. Panthers 14–0. **Drive: 9 plays, 75 yards, 3:54.**

**Second quarter**

- CAR – Jonathan Stewart 1-yard run (Graham Gano kick), 11:05. Panthers 21–0. **Drive: 7 plays, 65 yards, 3:40.**
- CAR – Graham Gano 43-yard field goal, 2:45. Panthers 24–0. **Drive: 13 plays, 35 yards, 6:31.**
- ARI – J. J. Nelson 5-yard pass from Carson Palmer (Chandler Catanzaro kick), 0:20. Panthers 24–7. **Drive: 9 plays, 75 yards, 2:25.**

**Third quarter**

- CAR – Graham Gano 52-yard field goal, 11:56. Panthers 27–7. **Drive: 8 plays, 41 yards, 3:04.**
- CAR – Graham Gano 21-yard field goal, 7:18. Panthers 30–7. **Drive: 9 plays, 55 yards, 3:07.**
- ARI – John Brown 17-yard pass from Carson Palmer (Chandler Catanzaro kick), 1:45. Panthers 30–14. **Drive: 10 plays, 75 yards, 5:33.**

**Fourth quarter**

- ARI – J. J. Nelson 4-yard pass from Carson Palmer (pass failed), 5:01. Panthers 30–20. **Drive: 14 plays, 92 yards, 4:49.**

**Top passers**

- ARI – Carson Palmer – 35/46, 363 yards, 3 TD, INT
- CAR – Cam Newton – 14/27, 212 yards

**Top rushers**

- ARI – David Johnson – 10 rushes, 24 yards
- CAR – Jonathan Stewart – 25 rushes, 95 yards, 2 TD

**Top receivers**

- ARI – David Johnson – 7 receptions, 84 yards
- CAR – Kelvin Benjamin – 2 receptions, 73 yards

The Panthers returned from their bye week for a rematch of the previous year's NFC Championship game, in which the Panthers defeated the Cardinals 49–15. The Panthers went up 24–7 before halftime and maintained their lead to win the game 30–20, giving them their second win of the season and a 2–5 record. The game was flexed out of a 4:25 time slot.

==== Week 9: at Los Angeles Rams ====
Week Nine: Carolina Panthers at Los Angeles Rams – Game summary

Quarter	1	2	3	4	Total
**Panthers**	7	0	0	6	**13**
Rams	0	0	0	10	**10**

at Los Angeles Memorial Coliseum, Los Angeles, California

- Date: November 6
- Game time: 4:05 p.m. EST/1:05 p.m. PST
- Game weather: 75 °F (24 °C), sunny
- Game attendance: 86,109
- Referee: Terry McAulay
- TV announcers (Fox): Kevin Burkhardt, John Lynch and Pam Oliver
- Recap, Gamebook

Game information

**First quarter**

- CAR – Greg Olsen 9-yard pass from Cam Newton (Graham Gano kick), 3:44. Panthers 7–0. **Drive: 9 plays, 53 yards, 5:07.**

**Second quarter**

- No scoring plays

**Third quarter**

- No scoring plays

**Fourth quarter**

- CAR – Graham Gano 38-yard field goal, 11:12. Panthers 10–0. **Drive: 9 plays, 35 yards, 3:53.**
- LA – Greg Zuerlein 25-yard field goal, 8:01. Panthers 10–3. **Drive: 10 plays, 68 yards, 3:11.**
- CAR – Graham Gano 37-yard field goal, 3:18. Panthers 13–3. **Drive: 8 plays, 56 yards, 4:43.**
- LA – Kenny Britt 10-yard pass from Case Keenum (Greg Zuerlein kick), 0:34. Panthers 13–10. **Drive: 15 plays, 75 yards, 2:44.**

**Top passers**

- CAR – Cam Newton – 20/32, 225 yards, TD
- LA – Case Keenum – 27/46, 296 yards, TD, INT

**Top rushers**

- CAR – Jonathan Stewart – 15 rushes, 42 yards
- LA – Todd Gurley – 12 rushes, 48 yards

**Top receivers**

- CAR – Kelvin Benjamin – 5 receptions, 76 yards
- LA – Lance Kendricks – 7 receptions, 90 yards

After the Panthers went into the fourth quarter with a seven-point lead, Graham Gano kicked a field goal making it 10–0. After both teams kicked field goals, and with less than two minutes left in the game, Los Angeles scored a touchdown, but the Panthers manage to win 13–10 improving to 3–5.

==== Week 10: vs. Kansas City Chiefs ====
Week Ten: Kansas City Chiefs at Carolina Panthers – Game summary

Quarter	1	2	3	4	Total
**Chiefs**	0	3	0	17	**20**
Panthers	3	14	0	0	**17**

at Bank of America Stadium, Charlotte, North Carolina

- Date: November 13
- Game time: 1:00 p.m. EST
- Game weather: 45 °F (7 °C), cloudy
- Game attendance: 74,181
- Referee: Carl Cheffers
- TV announcers (CBS): Ian Eagle, Dan Fouts and Evan Washburn
- Recap, Gamebook

Game information

**First quarter**

- CAR – Graham Gano 42-yard field goal, 10:49. Panthers 3–0. **Drive: 9 plays, 54 yards, 4:11.**

**Second quarter**

- CAR – Cam Newton 4-yard run (Graham Gano kick), 9:05. Panthers 10–0. **Drive: 11 plays, 80 yards, 5:44.**
- CAR – Devin Funchess 38-yard pass from Cam Newton (Graham Gano kick), 1:52. Panthers 17–0. **Drive: 7 plays, 87 yards, 3:36.**
- KC – Cairo Santos 47-yard field goal, 0:10. Panthers 17–3. **Drive: 12 plays, 46 yards, 1:42.**

**Third quarter**

- No scoring plays

**Fourth quarter**

- KC – Cairo Santos 36-yard field goal, 12:02. Panthers 17–6. **Drive: 11 plays, 62 yards, 3:19.**
- KC – Eric Berry 42-yard interception return (Alex Smith–Travis Kelce pass), 10:32. Panthers 17–14.
- KC – Cairo Santos 33-yard field goal, 4:25. Tied 17–17. **Drive: 7 plays, 35 yards, 3:09.**
- KC – Cairo Santos 37-yard field goal, 0:00. Chiefs 20–17. **Drive: 3 plays, 11 yards, 0:20.**

**Top passers**

- KC – Alex Smith – 25/38, 178 yards, INT
- CAR – Cam Newton – 23/38, 261 yards, TD, INT

**Top rushers**

- KC – Spencer Ware – 13 rushes, 61 yards
- CAR – Cam Newton – 12 rushes, 54 yards

**Top receivers**

- KC – Tyreek Hill – 10 receptions, 89 yards
- CAR – Kelvin Benjamin – 7 receptions, 84 yards

The Panthers went into the fourth quarter with a 17–3 lead over the Chiefs but things changed when Cairo Santos kicked a field goal, and Eric Berry had a pick six. Santos makes another field goal, tying the game at 17. In the Panthers' last possession of the game, the ball was stripped out of Kelvin Benjamin's hands and Kansas City recovered to set up the game-winning field goal.

==== Week 11: vs. New Orleans Saints ====
Week Eleven: New Orleans Saints at Carolina Panthers – Game summary

Quarter	1	2	3	4	Total
Saints	3	0	0	17	**20**
**Panthers**	3	17	3	0	**23**

at Bank of America Stadium, Charlotte, North Carolina

- Date: November 17
- Game time: 8:25 p.m. EST
- Game weather: 63 °F (17 °C), clear
- Game attendance: 73,288
- Referee: Pete Morelli
- TV announcers (NBC/NFLN/Twitter): Al Michaels, Cris Collinsworth and Heather Cox
- Recap, Gamebook

Game information

**First quarter**

- CAR – Graham Gano 32-yard field goal, 8:29. Panthers 3–0. **Drive: 11 plays, 18 yards, 4:46.**
- NO – Wil Lutz 27-yard field goal, 0:36. Tied 3–3. **Drive: 14 plays, 71 yards, 7:53.**

**Second quarter**

- CAR – Jonathan Stewart 1-yard run (Graham Gano kick), 5:40. Panthers 10–3. **Drive: 8 plays, 34 yards, 3:37.**
- CAR – Graham Gano 49-yard field goal, 2:50. Panthers 13–3. **Drive: 5 plays, 19 yards, 1:22.**
- CAR – Ted Ginn Jr. 40-yard pass from Cam Newton (Graham Gano kick), 0:16. Panthers 20–3. **Drive: 1 play, 40 yards, 0:07.**

**Third quarter**

- CAR – Graham Gano 42-yard field goal, 8:17. Panthers 23–3. **Drive: 14 plays, 51 yards, 6:43.**

**Fourth quarter**

- NO – Wil Lutz 30-yard field goal, 14:56. Panthers 23–6. **Drive: 16 plays, 58 yards, 8:21.**
- NO – Brandon Coleman 9-yard pass from Drew Brees (Wil Lutz kick), 11:22. Panthers 23–13. **Drive: 4 plays, 51 yards, 1:37.**
- NO – Coby Fleener 8-yard pass from Drew Brees (Wil Lutz kick), 2:52. Panthers 23–20. **Drive: 13 plays, 76 yards, 5:11.**

**Top passers**

- NO – Drew Brees – 35/44, 285 yards, 2 TD, INT
- CAR – Cam Newton – 14/33, 192 yards, TD

**Top rushers**

- NO – Tim Hightower – 12 rushes, 69 yards
- CAR – Jonathan Stewart – 18 rushes, 31 yards

**Top receivers**

- NO – Michael Thomas – 5 receptions, 68 yards
- CAR – Kelvin Benjamin – 3 receptions, 56 yards

After their embarrassing 17-point comeback loss four days prior, the Panthers hosted the Saints in a Thursday Night 'Color Rush' Matchup. Just like in the Chiefs game, the Panthers went into the fourth quarter holding New Orleans to only three points. They had a 23–3 lead but the Saints managed to rally and get within three with 5:11 left in the game. Late in the fourth quarter star linebacker Luke Kuechly left the game and was evaluated for a concussion. The Panthers were able to hold off New Orleans and win 23–20, improving to 4–6.

==== Week 12: at Oakland Raiders ====
Week Twelve: Carolina Panthers at Oakland Raiders – Game summary

Quarter	1	2	3	4	Total
Panthers	7	0	18	7	**32**
**Raiders**	7	17	0	11	**35**

at Oakland Alameda Coliseum, Oakland, California

- Date: November 27
- Game time: 4:25 p.m. EST/1:25 p.m. PST
- Game weather: 59 °F (15 °C), partly cloudy
- Game attendance: 54,909
- Referee: Jerome Boger
- TV announcers (CBS): Jim Nantz, Phil Simms and Tracy Wolfson
- Recap, Gamebook

Game information

**First quarter**

- OAK – Seth Roberts 2-yard pass from Derek Carr (Sebastian Janikowski kick), 4:48. Raiders 7–0. **Drive: 5 plays, 62 yards, 2:31.**
- CAR – Cam Newton 3-yard run (Graham Gano kick), 3:10. Tied 7–7. **Drive: 3 plays, 75 yards, 1:38.**

**Second quarter**

- OAK – Latavius Murray 4-yard run (Sebastian Janikowski kick), 12:48. Raiders 14–7. **Drive: 10 plays, 71 yards, 5:22.**
- OAK – Sebastian Janikowski 23-yard field goal, 6:49. Raiders 17–7. **Drive: 8 plays, 41 yards, 3:41.**
- OAK – Khalil Mack 6-yard interception return (Sebastian Janikowski kick), 0:59. Raiders 24–7.

**Third quarter**

- CAR – Jonathan Stewart 1-yard run (kick blocked), 10:33. Raiders 24–13. **Drive: 6 plays, 30 yards, 3:39.**
- CAR – Ted Ginn Jr. 88-yard pass from Cam Newton (pass failed), 7:43. Raiders 24–19. **Drive: 3 plays, 92 yards, 0:57.**
- CAR – Jonathan Stewart 3-yard run (pass failed), 1:46. Panthers 25–24. **Drive: 5 plays, 28 yards, 2:43.**

**Fourth quarter**

- CAR – Kelvin Benjamin 44-yard pass from Cam Newton (Graham Gano kick), 13:26. Panthers 32–24. **Drive: 7 plays, 76 yards, 2:57.**
- OAK – Clive Walford 12-yard pass from Derek Carr (Derek Carr–Seth Roberts pass), 8:37. Tied 32–32. **Drive: 10 plays, 75 yards, 4:49.**
- OAK – Sebastian Janikowski 23-yard field goal, 1:45. Raiders 35–32. **Drive: 12 plays, 82 yards, 3:20.**

**Top passers**

- CAR – Cam Newton – 14/29, 246 yards, 2 TD, INT
- OAK – Derek Carr – 26/38, 315 yards, 2 TD, INT

**Top rushers**

- CAR – Jonathan Stewart – 17 rushes, 96 yards, 2 TD
- OAK – Latavius Murray – 19 rushes, 45 yards, TD

**Top receivers**

- CAR – Ted Ginn Jr. – 4 receptions, 115 yards, TD
- OAK – Michael Crabtree – 8 receptions, 110 yards

Carolina had a rough start in the first half, only scoring seven points, and went into halftime seventeen points behind Oakland. They turned things around and had an explosive third quarter scoring eighteen points giving them a one-point lead over the Raiders. In the fourth quarter the Panthers went on to score seven but the Raiders answered back tying the game. In their last possession of the game the ball was taken from Cam Newton giving Oakland the ball back. Carolina could not hold on as Oakland kicked a field goal winning the game. They fall to 4–7.

==== Week 13: at Seattle Seahawks ====
Week Thirteen: Carolina Panthers at Seattle Seahawks – Game summary

Quarter	1	2	3	4	Total
Panthers	0	7	0	0	**7**
**Seahawks**	10	13	7	10	**40**

at CenturyLink Field, Seattle, Washington

- Date: December 4
- Game time: 8:30 p.m. EST/5:30 p.m. PST
- Game weather: 37 °F (3 °C), partly cloudy
- Game attendance: 69,104
- Referee: John Parry
- TV announcers (NBC): Al Michaels, Cris Collinsworth and Michele Tafoya
- Recap, Gamebook

Game information

**First quarter**

- SEA – Steven Hauschka 23-yard field goal, 13:23. Seahawks 3–0. **Drive: 4 plays, 3 yards, 1:23.**
- SEA – Thomas Rawls 8-yard run (Steven Hauschka kick), 6:42. Seahawks 10–0. **Drive: 9 plays, 92 yards, 3:55.**

**Second quarter**

- CAR – Ted Ginn Jr. 55-yard pass from Cam Newton (Graham Gano kick), 10:32. Seahawks 10–7. **Drive: 3 plays, 48 yards, 1:26.**
- SEA – Thomas Rawls 45-yard run (Steven Hauschka kick), 9:44. Seahawks 17–7. **Drive: 2 plays, 57 yards, 0:48.**
- SEA – Steven Hauschka 37-yard field goal, 1:45. Seahawks 20–7. **Drive: 11 plays, 56 yards, 5:43.**
- SEA – Steven Hauschka 31-yard field goal, 0:07. Seahawks 23–7. **Drive: 9 plays, 72 yards, 1:12.**

**Third quarter**

- SEA – Tyler Lockett 75-yard run (Steven Hauschka kick), 14:48. Seahawks 30–7. **Drive: 1 play, 75 yards, 0:12.**

**Fourth quarter**

- SEA – Jimmy Graham 1-yard pass from Russell Wilson (Steven Hauschka kick), 11:09. Seahawks 37–7. **Drive: 10 plays, 84 yards, 5:15.**
- SEA – Steven Hauschka 28-yard field goal, 3:28. Seahawks 40–7. **Drive: 11 plays, 70 yards, 6:00.**

**Top passers**

- CAR – Cam Newton – 14/32, 182 yards, TD
- SEA – Russell Wilson – 26/36, 277 yards, TD, INT

**Top rushers**

- CAR – Jonathan Stewart – 11 rushes, 50 yards
- SEA – Thomas Rawls – 15 rushes, 106 yards, 2 TD

**Top receivers**

- CAR – Ted Ginn Jr. – 5 receptions, 80 yards, TD
- SEA – Jermaine Kearse – 5 receptions, 68 yards

In a Sunday Night Football rematch of last season's NFC Divisional Round Game, the Panthers were defeated by the Seahawks 40–7, and fell to 4–8. The Panthers would not appear on NBC Sunday Night Football again until 2026.

==== Week 14: vs. San Diego Chargers ====
Week Fourteen: San Diego Chargers at Carolina Panthers – Game summary

Quarter	1	2	3	4	Total
Chargers	0	7	9	0	**16**
**Panthers**	10	13	3	2	**28**

at Bank of America Stadium, Charlotte, North Carolina

- Date: December 11
- Game time: 1:00 p.m. EST
- Game weather: 37 °F (3 °C), cloudy
- Game attendance: 73,856
- Referee: Ronald Torbert
- TV announcers (Fox): Sam Rosen, Brady Quinn and Holly Sonders
- Recap, Gamebook

Game information

**First quarter**

- CAR – Graham Gano 41-yard field goal, 10:19. Panthers 3–0. **Drive: 9 plays, 29 yards, 3:10.**
- CAR – Jonathan Stewart 1-yard run (Graham Gano kick), 1:48. Panthers 10–0. **Drive: 7 plays, 35 yards, 3:23.**

**Second quarter**

- CAR – Devin Funchess 6-yard pass from Cam Newton (Graham Gano kick), 11:12. Panthers 17–0. **Drive: 8 plays, 58 yards, 3:33.**
- CAR – Graham Gano 44-yard field goal, 5:23. Panthers 20–0. **Drive: 6 plays, 34 yards, 2:48.**
- CAR – Graham Gano 45-yard field goal, 3:49. Panthers 23–0. **Drive: 4 plays, 1 yard, 0:47.**
- SD – Hunter Henry 9-yard pass from Philip Rivers (Josh Lambo kick), 1:03. Panthers 23–7. **Drive: 9 plays, 75 yards, 2:46.**

**Third quarter**

- CAR – Graham Gano 23-yard field goal, 11:29. Panthers 26–7. **Drive: 9 plays, 70 yards, 3:31.**
- SD – Josh Lambo 32-yard field goal, 4:26. Panthers 26–10. **Drive: 14 plays, 61 yards, 7:03.**
- SD – Dontrelle Inman 19-yard pass from Philip Rivers (pass failed), 0:30. Panthers 26–16. **Drive: 5 plays, 66 yards, 2:08.**

**Fourth quarter**

- CAR – Philip Rivers sacked in the end zone by Mario Addison for a safety, 10:09. Panthers 28–16.

**Top passers**

- SD – Philip Rivers – 21/39, 236 yards, 2 TD, 3 INT
- CAR – Cam Newton – 10/27, 160 yards, TD, INT

**Top rushers**

- SD – Kenneth Farrow – 16 rushes, 55 yards
- CAR – Jonathan Stewart – 24 rushes, 66 yards, TD

**Top receivers**

- SD – Dontrelle Inman – 6 receptions, 71 yards, TD
- CAR – Greg Olsen – 4 receptions, 87 yards

The Panthers managed to win at home, defeating San Diego 28–16. They improved to 5–8.

==== Week 15: at Washington Redskins ====
Week Fifteen: Carolina Panthers at Washington Redskins – Game summary

Quarter	1	2	3	4	Total
**Panthers**	10	3	10	3	**26**
Redskins	3	6	0	6	**15**

at FedExField, Landover, Maryland

- Date: December 19
- Game time: 8:30 p.m. EST
- Game weather: 32 °F (0 °C), clear
- Game attendance: 76,689
- Referee: Walt Coleman
- TV announcers (ESPN): Sean McDonough, Jon Gruden and Lisa Salters
- Recap, Gamebook

Game information

**First quarter**

- CAR – Graham Gano 35-yard field goal, 12:40. Panthers 3–0. **Drive: 7 plays, 58 yards, 2:20.**
- WAS – Dustin Hopkins 43-yard field goal, 6:18. Tied 3–3. **Drive: 8 plays, 38 yards, 3:52.**
- CAR – Ted Ginn Jr. 30-yard pass from Cam Newton (Graham Gano kick), 1:50. Panthers 10–3. **Drive: 8 plays, 84 yards, 4:28.**

**Second quarter**

- CAR – Graham Gano 23-yard field goal, 12:21. Panthers 13–3. **Drive: 6 plays, 19 yards, 3:07.**
- WAS – Robert Kelley 5-yard run (kick failed, wide left), 3:43. Panthers 13–9. **Drive: 7 plays, 89 yards, 4:54.**

**Third quarter**

- CAR – Mike Tolbert 1-yard pass from Cam Newton (Graham Gano kick), 13:58. Panthers 20–9. **Drive: 2 plays, 1 yard, 0:49.**
- CAR – Graham Gano 23-yard field goal, 5:07. Panthers 23–9. **Drive: 8 plays, 65 yards, 3:57.**

**Fourth quarter**

- WAS – Dustin Hopkins 26-yard field goal, 14:08. Panthers 23–12. **Drive: 13 plays, 67 yards, 5:59.**
- WAS – Dustin Hopkins 34-yard field goal, 3:44. Panthers 23–15. **Drive: 9 plays, 56 yards, 1:53.**
- CAR – Graham Gano 41-yard field goal, 1:07. Panthers 26–15. **Drive: 7 plays, 48 yards, 2:37.**

**Top passers**

- CAR – Cam Newton – 21/37, 300 yards, 2 TD
- WAS – Kirk Cousins – 32/47, 315 yards, INT

**Top rushers**

- CAR – Jonathan Stewart – 25 rushes, 132 yards
- WAS – Kirk Cousins – 2 rushes, 11 yards

**Top receivers**

- CAR – Greg Olsen – 6 receptions, 85 yards
- WAS – DeSean Jackson – 7 receptions, 111 yards

In their second Monday Night Football game of the season, the Panthers took on the Washington Redskins at FedExField in Landover, Maryland. Carolina defeated Washington 26–15, and kept their slim chances of making the playoffs alive by improving to 6–8.

==== Week 16: vs. Atlanta Falcons ====
Week Sixteen: Atlanta Falcons at Carolina Panthers – Game summary

Quarter	1	2	3	4	Total
**Falcons**	13	7	3	10	**33**
Panthers	0	3	10	3	**16**

at Bank of America Stadium, Charlotte, North Carolina

- Date: December 24
- Game time: 1:00 p.m. EST
- Game weather: 56 °F (13 °C), cloudy
- Game attendance: 73,549
- Referee: Bill Vinovich
- TV announcers (Fox): Thom Brennaman, Charles Davis, Chris Spielman and Peter Schrager
- Recap, Gamebook

Game information

**First quarter**

- ATL – Joshua Perkins 26-yard pass from Matt Ryan (Matt Bryant kick), 10:57. Falcons 7–0. **Drive: 8 plays, 75 yards, 4:03.**
- ATL – Matt Bryant 51-yard field goal, 6:09. Falcons 10–0. **Drive: 5 plays, 12 yards, 2:18.**
- ATL – Matt Bryant 48-yard field goal, 0:35. Falcons 13–0. **Drive: 7 plays, 44 yards, 4:03.**

**Second quarter**

- CAR – Graham Gano 31-yard field goal, 10:17. Falcons 13–3. **Drive: 6 plays, 31 yards, 1:32.**
- ATL – D. J. Tialavea 1-yard pass from Matt Ryan (Matt Bryant kick), 5:34. Falcons 20–3. **Drive: 11 plays, 75 yards, 4:43.**

**Third quarter**

- CAR – Graham Gano 40-yard field goal, 9:23. Falcons 20–6. **Drive: 13 plays, 53 yards, 5:37.**
- ATL – Matt Bryant 29-yard field goal, 3:34. Falcons 23–6. **Drive: 10 plays, 64 yards, 5:49.**
- CAR – Kelvin Benjamin 26-yard pass from Cam Newton (Graham Gano kick), 0:00. Falcons 23–13. **Drive: 8 plays, 56 yards, 3:34.**

**Fourth quarter**

- ATL – Tevin Coleman 55-yard run (Matt Bryant kick), 13:19. Falcons 30–13. **Drive: 4 plays, 75 yards, 1:41.**
- CAR – Graham Gano 31-yard field goal, 9:43. Falcons 30–16. **Drive: 11 plays, 62 yards, 3:36.**
- ATL – Matt Bryant 50-yard field goal, 1:55. Falcons 33–16. **Drive: 4 plays, 3 yards, 1:45.**

**Top passers**

- ATL – Matt Ryan – 27/33, 277 yards, 2 TD
- CAR – Cam Newton – 18/43, 198 yards, TD, 2 INT

**Top rushers**

- ATL – Tevin Coleman – 9 rushes, 90 yards, TD
- CAR – Jonathan Stewart – 11 rushes, 50 yards

**Top receivers**

- ATL – Julio Jones – 4 receptions, 60 yards
- CAR – Kelvin Benjamin – 4 receptions, 63 yards

With the loss, the Panthers fell to 6–9, officially eliminating them from the playoffs and getting them swept by the Falcons. They are the first team to go 15–1 the previous season and miss the playoffs the next season, as well as the first Super Bowl runner-up to miss the playoffs since the 2008 Patriots.

==== Week 17: at Tampa Bay Buccaneers ====
Week Seventeen: Carolina Panthers at Tampa Bay Buccaneers – Game summary

Quarter	1	2	3	4	Total
Panthers	7	0	3	6	**16**
**Buccaneers**	3	0	7	7	**17**

at Raymond James Stadium, Tampa, Florida

- Date: January 1, 2017
- Game time: 1:00 p.m. EST
- Game weather: 81 °F (27 °C), cloudy
- Game attendance: 62,037
- Referee: Carl Cheffers
- TV announcers (Fox): Thom Brennaman, Charles Davis, Chris Spielman and Peter Schager
- Recap, Gamebook

Game information

**First quarter**

- TB – Roberto Aguayo 33-yard field goal, 11:02. Buccaneers 3–0. **Drive: 10 plays, 60 yards, 3:58.**
- CAR – Jonathan Stewart 2-yard run (Graham Gano kick), 8:22. Panthers 7–3. **Drive: 6 plays, 75 yards, 2:40.**

**Second quarter**

- No scoring plays

**Third quarter**

- TB – Brent Grimes 31-yard interception return (Roberto Aguayo kick), 14:19. Buccaneers 10–7.
- CAR – Graham Gano 54-yard field goal, 6:37. Tied 10–10. **Drive: 7 plays, 50 yards, 3:08.**

**Fourth quarter**

- TB – Mike Evans 10-yard pass from Jameis Winston (Roberto Aguayo kick), 3:13. Buccaneers 17–10. **Drive: 8 plays, 74 yards, 2:52.**
- CAR – Kelvin Benjamin 5-yard pass from Cam Newton (pass failed), 0:17. Buccaneers 17–16. **Drive: 10 plays, 74 yards, 2:56.**

**Top passers**

- CAR – Cam Newton – 18/32, 237 yards, TD, 3 INT
- TB – Jameis Winston – 20/35, 202 yards, TD, INT

**Top rushers**

- CAR – Jonathan Stewart – 20 rushes, 65 yards, TD
- TB – Jacquizz Rodgers – 17 rushes, 75 yards

**Top receivers**

- CAR – Kelvin Benjamin – 6 receptions, 93 yards, TD
- TB – Adam Humphries – 10 receptions, 94 yards

Carolina attempted to win on a game-winning 2-point attempt but Newton's pass failed, giving the Bucs a narrow 17–16 victory. The Panthers finish the season at 6–10, the worst record for a team that went 15–1 the previous season.

== Standings ==
=== Division ===
NFC South
	W	L	T	PCT	DIV	CONF	PF	PA	STK
^{(2)} Atlanta Falcons	11	5	0	.688	5–1	9–3	540	406	W4
Tampa Bay Buccaneers	9	7	0	.563	4–2	7–5	354	369	W1
New Orleans Saints	7	9	0	.438	2–4	6–6	469	454	L1
Carolina Panthers	6	10	0	.375	1–5	5–7	369	402	L2

=== Conference ===
NFC
#	Team	Division	W	L	T	PCT	DIV	CONF	SOS	SOV	STK
Division leaders
1	Dallas Cowboys	East	13	3	0	.813	3–3	9–3	.471	.440	L1
2	Atlanta Falcons	South	11	5	0	.688	5–1	9–3	.480	.452	W4
3	Seattle Seahawks	West	10	5	1	.656	3–2–1	6–5–1	.441	.425	W1
4	Green Bay Packers	North	10	6	0	.625	5–1	8–4	.508	.453	W6
Wild Cards
5	New York Giants	East	11	5	0	.688	4–2	8–4	.486	.455	W1
6 (Note: Detroit finished ahead of Tampa Bay for the No. 6 seed and qualified for the last playoff spot based on record vs. common opponents—Detroit's cumulative record against Chicago, Dallas, Los Angeles and New Orleans was 3–2, while Tampa Bay's cumulative record against the same four teams was 2–3.)	Detroit Lions	North	9	7	0	.563	3–3	7–5	.475	.392	L3
Did not qualify for the postseason
7	Tampa Bay Buccaneers	South	9	7	0	.563	4–2	7–5	.492	.434	W1
8	Washington Redskins	East	8	7	1	.531	3–3	6–6	.516	.430	L1
9	Minnesota Vikings	North	8	8	0	.500	2–4	5–7	.492	.457	W1
10	Arizona Cardinals	West	7	8	1	.469	4–1–1	6–5–1	.463	.366	W2
11 (Note: New Orleans finished ahead of Philadelphia based on better record vs. conference opponents.)	New Orleans Saints	South	7	9	0	.438	2–4	6–6	.523	.393	L1
12	Philadelphia Eagles	East	7	9	0	.438	2–4	5–7	.559	.518	W2
13	Carolina Panthers	South	6	10	0	.375	1–5	5–7	.518	.354	L2
14	Los Angeles Rams	West	4	12	0	.250	2–4	3–9	.504	.500	L7
15	Chicago Bears	North	3	13	0	.188	2–4	3–9	.521	.396	L4
16	San Francisco 49ers	West	2	14	0	.125	2–4	2–10	.504	.250	L1
Tiebreakers (Note: When breaking ties for three or more teams under the NFL's rules, they are first broken within divisions, then comparing only the highest-ranked remaining team from each division.)
