= 2016 New Orleans Saints season =

NFL team season

- Owner: Tom Benson
- General manager: Mickey Loomis
- Head coach: Sean Payton
- Offensive coordinator: Pete Carmichael Jr.
- Defensive coordinator: Dennis Allen
- Home stadium: Mercedes-Benz Superdome

Results
- Record: 7–9
- Division place: 3rd NFC South
- Playoffs: Did not qualify
- Pro Bowlers: Drew Brees (QB)

Uniform
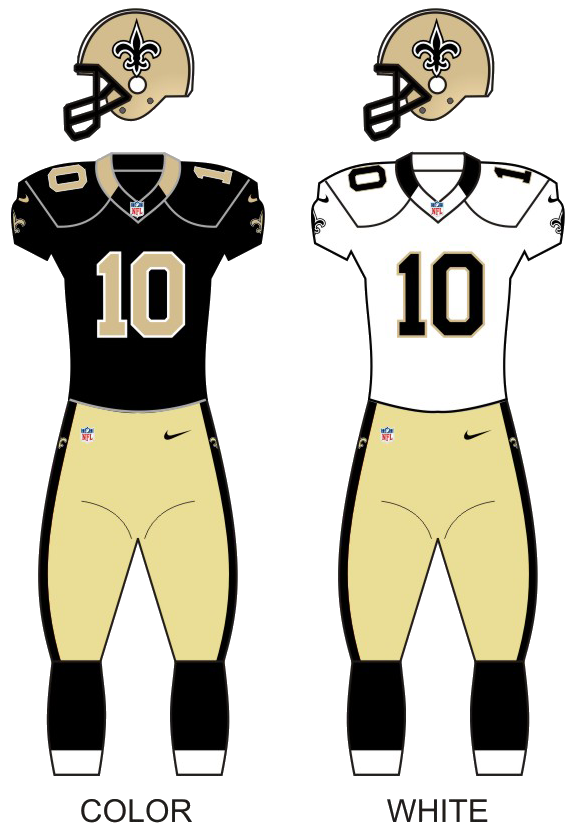

The 2016 season was the New Orleans Saints' 50th in the National Football League (NFL), their 41st playing home games at the Mercedes-Benz Superdome, and their 10th under head coach Sean Payton. The Saints matched their 7–9 record from 2014 and 2015, and missed the playoffs for the third year in a row in a stretch plagued by poor defensive play. One highlight from the season includes quarterback Drew Brees' first return to San Diego for the first time since the Chargers released him at the end of the 2005 season, also where Brees played his first five seasons in. This came 10 years after the Chargers released Brees after the Saints' previous regular season meetings with the Chargers were home games for the Saints, and including a 2008 meeting at Wembley Stadium in London, a game which New Orleans was designated as the home team.

== Draft ==
New Orleans Saints 2016 draft picks
Round	Selection	Player	Position	College
1	12	Sheldon Rankins	DT	Louisville
2	47	Michael Thomas	WR	Ohio St.
2	61	Vonn Bell	S	Ohio St.
4	120	David Onyemata	DT	Manitoba
7	237	Daniel Lasco	RB	California

Notes

- The Saints traded their 2016 sixth-round selection, along with their 2015 sixth-round selection to the Washington Redskins in exchange for the Washington Redskins 2015 fifth-round selection.
- The Saints traded their 2016 third and fourth-round selection to the New England Patriots in exchange for the New England Patriots second-round selection (61st overall).
- The Saints traded their 2016 fifth-round selection, along with their 2017 fifth-round selection to the Washington Redskins in exchange for the Washington Redskins fourth-round selection (120th overall).

== Staff ==
2016 New Orleans Saints staff
Front office: Owner – Gayle Benson; President – Dennis Lauscha; Executive vice president/general manager – Mickey Loomis; Asst general manager/college scouting director – Jeff Ireland; Vice president of football administration – Khai Harley; Director of operations – James Nagaoka; Director of pro scouting – Terry Fontenot; Head coaches: Head coach – Sean Payton; Assistant head coach/tight ends – Dan Campbell; Assistant head coach/inside linebackers – Joe Vitt; Offensive coaches: Offensive coordinator – Pete Carmichael; Quarterbacks – Joe Lombardi; Running backs – Joel Thomas; Wide receivers – John Morton; Offensive line – Dan Roushar; Offensive assistant – Ronald Curry; Offensive assistant – Brendan Nugent	Defensive coaches: Defensive coordinator – Dennis Allen; Defensive line – Bill Johnson; Secondary – Aaron Glenn; Senior defensive assistant – Peter Giunta; Defensive assistant – Marcus Ungaro; Defensive assistant/linebackers – James Willis; Pass rush specialist – Brian Young; Special teams coaches: Special teams coordinator – Greg McMahon; Assistant special teams – Stan Kwan; Strength and conditioning: Head strength and conditioning – Dan Dalrymple; Assistant strength and conditioning – Charles Byrd; Assistant strength and conditioning – Rob Wenning

== Final roster ==
2016 New Orleans Saints roster
Quarterbacks (QB): 9 Drew Brees; 7 Luke McCown; Running backs (RB): 38 Travaris Cadet; 34 Tim Hightower; 22 Mark Ingram; 29 John Kuhn FB; 36 Daniel Lasco; 23 Marcus Murphy; Wide receivers (WR): 16 Brandon Coleman; 10 Brandin Cooks; 11 Corey Fuller; 19 Jake Lampman; 87 Tommylee Lewis; 83 Willie Snead; 13 Michael Thomas; Tight ends (TE): 82 Coby Fleener; 86 John Phillips	Offensive linemen (OL): 66 Jack Allen C; 73 Jahri Evans G; 76 Tony Hills T; 65 Senio Kelemete G; 68 Tim Lelito G; 75 Andrus Peat G; 64 Zach Strief T; 78 Landon Turner G; 60 Max Unger C; Defensive linemen (DL): 95 Tyeler Davison DT; 91 Kasim Edebali DE; 90 Nick Fairley DT; 94 Cameron Jordan DE; 99 Paul Kruger DE; 93 David Onyemata DT; 98 Sheldon Rankins DT; 55 Darryl Tapp DE	Linebackers (LB): 97 Sam Barrington MLB; 59 Dannell Ellerbe MLB; 42 Travis Feeney OLB; 52 Craig Robertson OLB; 54 Nate Stupar MLB; 57 Jason Trusnik LB; Defensive backs (DB): 37 Chris Banjo FS; 48 Vonn Bell SS; 31 Jairus Byrd FS; 39 Taveze Calhoun CB; 41 Roman Harper SS; 21 De'Vante Harris CB; 49 Shiloh Keo FS; 24 Sterling Moore CB; 35 Robenson Therezie SS; 28 B. W. Webb CB; Special teams (ST): 47 Justin Drescher LS; 3 Wil Lutz K; 6 Thomas Morstead P	Practice squad: 53 Brian Blechen OLB; 79 Rob Crisp T; 77 John Fullington G; 18 Garrett Grayson QB; 45 Garrett Griffin TE; 96 Ashaad Mabry DT; 85 Jake Stoneburner TE; 81 Jordan Williams-Lambert WR; 92 Justin Zimmer DT; Reserve: 50 Stephone Anthony MLB (IR); 72 Terron Armstead LT (IR); 40 Delvin Breaux CB (IR); 46 Ken Crawley CB (IR); 58 Obum Gwacham DE (IR); 30 Erik Harris SS (IR); 89 Josh Hill TE (IR); 84 Michael Hoomanawanui TE (IR); 44 Hau'oli Kikaha OLB (PUP); 70 Mitchell Loewen DE (NF-Inj.); 56 Michael Mauti MLB (NF-Inj.); -- D. J. Pettway DE (IR); 43 Jimmy Pruitt CB (IR); 33 Jamarca Sanford SS (IR); 27 Damian Swann CB (IR); 32 Kenny Vaccaro SS (Susp.); 25 P. J. Williams CB (IR); 24 Kyle Wilson CB (IR); 67 Avery Young T (NF-Inj.); Rookies in italics 53 active, 19 reserve, 9 practice squad

== Schedule ==
=== Preseason ===
Week	Date	Opponent	Result	Record	Venue	Recap
1	August 11	at New England Patriots	L 22–34	0–1	Gillette Stadium	Recap
2	August 20	at Houston Texans	L 9–16	0–2	NRG Stadium	Recap
3	August 26	Pittsburgh Steelers	L 14–27	0–3	Mercedes-Benz Superdome	Recap
4	September 1	Baltimore Ravens	L 14–23	0–4	Mercedes-Benz Superdome	Recap

=== Regular season ===
Week	Date	Opponent	Result	Record	Venue	Recap
1	September 11	Oakland Raiders	L 34–35	0–1	Mercedes-Benz Superdome	Recap
2	September 18	at New York Giants	L 13–16	0–2	MetLife Stadium	Recap
3	September 26	Atlanta Falcons	L 32–45	0–3	Mercedes-Benz Superdome	Recap
4	October 2	at San Diego Chargers	W 35–34	1–3	Qualcomm Stadium	Recap
5	Bye					
6	October 16	Carolina Panthers	W 41–38	2–3	Mercedes-Benz Superdome	Recap
7	October 23	at Kansas City Chiefs	L 21–27	2–4	Arrowhead Stadium	Recap
8	October 30	Seattle Seahawks	W 25–20	3–4	Mercedes-Benz Superdome	Recap
9	November 6	at San Francisco 49ers	W 41–23	4–4	Levi's Stadium	Recap
10	November 13	Denver Broncos	L 23–25	4–5	Mercedes-Benz Superdome	Recap
11	November 17	at Carolina Panthers	L 20–23	4–6	Bank of America Stadium	Recap
12	November 27	Los Angeles Rams	W 49–21	5–6	Mercedes-Benz Superdome	Recap
13	December 4	Detroit Lions	L 13–28	5–7	Mercedes-Benz Superdome	Recap
14	December 11	at Tampa Bay Buccaneers	L 11–16	5–8	Raymond James Stadium	Recap
15	December 18	at Arizona Cardinals	W 48–41	6–8	University of Phoenix Stadium	Recap
16	December 24	Tampa Bay Buccaneers	W 31–24	7–8	Mercedes-Benz Superdome	Recap
17	January 1	at Atlanta Falcons	L 32–38	7–9	Georgia Dome	Recap

=== Game summaries ===
==== Week 1: vs. Oakland Raiders ====
Week One: Oakland Raiders at New Orleans Saints – Game summary

Quarter	1	2	3	4	Total
Raiders	10	0	3	22	35
Saints	3	14	7	10	34

at Mercedes-Benz Superdome, New Orleans, Louisiana

- Date: September 11
- Game time: 12:00 p.m. CDT
- Game weather: Played indoors (dome stadium)
- Game attendance: 73,028
- Referee: John Parry
- TV announcers (Fox): Chris Myers, Ronde Barber and Jennifer Hale
- Recap, Gamebook

Game information

First quarter

- OAK – Sebastian Janikowski 47-yard field goal, 12:23. Raiders 3–0. Drive: 4 plays, −8 yards, 2:22.
- NO – Wil Lutz 42-yard field goal, 6:31. Tied 3–3. Drive: 13 plays, 65 yards, 5:52.
- OAK – Latavius Murray 6-yard run (Sebastian Janikowski kick), 1:43. Raiders 10–3. Drive: 7 plays, 91 yards, 4:48.

Second quarter

- NO – Willie Snead 1-yard pass from Drew Brees (Wil Lutz kick), 11:57. Tied 10–10. Drive: 9 plays, 75 yards, 4:46.
- NO – Brandin Cooks 15-yard pass from Drew Brees (Wil Lutz kick), 4:55. Saints 17–10. Drive: 8 plays, 80 yards, 4:06.

Third quarter

- NO – Brandin Cooks 98-yard pass from Drew Brees (Wil Lutz kick), 7:52. Saints 24–10. Drive: 1 play, 98 yards, 0:11.
- OAK – Sebastian Janikowski 31-yard field goal, 3:11. Saints 24–13. Drive: 12 plays, 62 yards, 4:41.

Fourth quarter

- OAK – Jamize Olawale 2-yard run (pass failed), 11:53. Saints 24–19. Drive: 4 plays, 60 yards, 1:49.
- NO – Wil Lutz 20-yard field goal, 8:42. Saints 27–19. Drive: 6 plays, 69 yards, 3:11.
- OAK – Jalen Richard 75-yard run (Derek Carr–Amari Cooper pass), 8:26. Tied 27–27. Drive: 2 plays, 75 yards, 0:16.
- NO – Travaris Cadet 2-yard pass from Drew Brees (Wil Lutz kick), 6:03. Saints 34–27. Drive: 3 plays, 84 yards, 2:23.
- OAK – Seth Roberts 10-yard pass from Derek Carr (Derek Carr–Michael Crabtree pass), 0:47. Raiders 35–34. Drive: 11 plays, 75 yards, 5:16.

Top passers

- OAK – Derek Carr – 24/38, 319 yards, TD
- NO – Drew Brees – 28/42, 423 yards, 4 TD

Top rushers

- OAK – Jalen Richard – 3 rushes, 84 yards, TD
- NO – Mark Ingram II – 12 rushes, 58 yards

Top receivers

- OAK – Amari Cooper – 8 receptions, 137 yards
- NO – Willie Snead – 9 receptions, 172 yards, TD

The Saints opened the season at home against the Oakland Raiders in the Mercedes-Benz Superdome. Despite 423 passing yards—including a franchise-record 98-yard touchdown pass to receiver Brandin Cooks—and four touchdowns from Drew Brees, the Raiders came from behind to win 35–34. The Raiders scored a touchdown with 47 seconds remaining in the game to bring them within one point. Instead of kicking an extra point, Raiders coach Jack Del Rio ordered a two-point conversion, which quarterback Derek Carr successfully converted with a pass to receiver Michael Crabtree. The Saints received the kickoff and Brees led the team down the field in two plays to give kicker Wil Lutz a chance at a game-winning 61-yard field goal, but the kick went wide left. The Saints defense was criticized for its performance, as it gave up 210 yards and 22 points in the fourth quarter.

==== Week 2: at New York Giants ====
Week Two: New Orleans Saints at New York Giants – Game summary

Quarter	1	2	3	4	Total
Saints	0	3	0	10	13
Giants	0	7	3	6	16

at MetLife Stadium, East Rutherford, New Jersey

- Date: September 18
- Game time: 1:00 p.m. EDT/12:00 p.m. CDT
- Game weather: 80 °F (27 °C), mostly cloudy
- Game attendance: 77,727
- Referee: Gene Steratore
- TV announcers (Fox): Kenny Albert, Daryl Johnston and Laura Okmin
- Recap, Gamebook

Game information

First quarter

- No scoring plays

Second quarter

- NYG – Janoris Jenkins 65-yard return of blocked field goal (Josh Brown kick), 2:30. Giants 7–0.
- NO – Wil Lutz 39-yard field goal, 0:07. Giants 7–3. Drive: 11 plays, 54 yards, 2:23.

Third quarter

- NYG – Josh Brown 48-yard field goal, 2:46. Giants 10–3. Drive: 11 plays, 54 yards, 5:58.

Fourth quarter

- NO – Willie Snead IV 17-yard pass from Drew Brees (Wil Lutz kick), 13:45. Tied 10–10. Drive: 9 plays, 74 yards, 4:01.
- NYG – Josh Brown 19-yard field goal, 8:46. Giants 13–10. Drive: 11 plays, 74 yards, 4:59.
- NO – Wil Lutz 45-yard field goal, 2:54. Tied 13–13. Drive: 8 plays, 47 yards, 3:13.
- NYG – Josh Brown 23-yard field goal, 0:00. Giants 16–13. Drive: 11 plays, 70 yards, 2:54.

Top passers

- NO – Drew Brees – 29/44, 263 yards, TD
- NYG – Eli Manning – 32/41, 368 yards

Top rushers

- NO – Mark Ingram II – 9 rushes, 30 yards
- NYG – Shane Vereen – 14 rushes, 42 yards

Top receivers

- NO – Brandin Cooks – 7 receptions, 68 yards
- NYG – Sterling Shepard – 8 receptions, 117 yards

==== Week 3: vs. Atlanta Falcons ====
Week Three: Atlanta Falcons at New Orleans Saints – Game summary

Quarter	1	2	3	4	Total
Falcons	7	21	10	7	45
Saints	7	10	8	7	32

at Mercedes-Benz Superdome, New Orleans, Louisiana

- Date: September 26
- Game time: 7:30 p.m. CDT
- Game weather: Played indoors (dome stadium)
- Game attendance: 73,003
- Referee: Pete Morelli
- TV announcers (ESPN): Sean McDonough, Jon Gruden and Lisa Salters
- Recap, Gamebook

Game information

First quarter

- NO – Coby Fleener 2-yard pass from Drew Brees (Wil Lutz kick), 8:25. Saints 7–0. Drive: 11 plays, 75, yards, 6:35.
- ATL – Tevin Coleman 2-yard run (Matt Bryant kick), 5:21. Tied 7–7. Drive: 3 plays, 11 yards, 0:52.

Second quarter

- ATL – Devonta Freeman 13-yard pass from Matt Ryan (Matt Bryant kick), 14:53. Falcons 14–7. Drive: 11 plays, 74, yards, 5:08.
- NO – Michael Thomas 3-yard pass from Drew Brees (Wil Lutz kick), 9:55. Tied 14–14. Drive: 12 plays, 75, yards, 4:58.
- ATL – Tevin Coleman 2-yard run (Matt Bryant kick), 5:31. Falcons 21–14. Drive: 11 plays, 75 yards, 4:24.
- ATL – Justin Hardy 4-yard pass from Matt Ryan (Matt Bryant kick), 0:28. Falcons 28–14. Drive: 8 plays, 94, yards, 1:23.
- NO – Wil Lutz 57-yard field goal, 0:00. Falcons 28–17. Drive: 7 plays, 36 yards, 0:28.

Third quarter

- ATL – Tevin Coleman 6-yard run (Matt Bryant kick), 12:03. Falcons 35–17. Drive: 6 plays, 75 yards, 2:57.
- NO – John Kuhn 3-yard run (Mark Ingram II run), 7:38. Falcons 35–25. Drive: 9 plays, 75 yards, 4:25.
- ATL – Matt Bryant 21-yard field goal, 2:58. Falcons 38–25. Drive: 11 plays, 76 yards, 4:40.

Fourth quarter

- ATL – Deion Jones 90-yard interception return (Matt Bryant kick), 13:37. Falcons 45–25. Drive: 9 plays, 64 yards, 4:21.
- NO – Mark Ingram II 5-yard pass from Drew Brees (Wil Lutz kick), 10:00. Falcons 45–32. Drive: 7 plays, 75, yards, 3:37.

Top passers

- ATL – Matt Ryan – 20/30, 240 yards, 2 TD
- NO – Drew Brees – 36/54, 376 yards, 3 TD, INT

Top rushers

- ATL – Devonta Freeman – 14 rushes, 152 yards
- NO – Mark Ingram II – 15 rushes, 77 yards

Top receivers

- ATL – Devonta Freeman – 5 receptions, 55 yards, TD
- NO – Coby Fleener – 7 receptions, 109 yards, TD

==== Week 4: at San Diego Chargers ====
Week Four: New Orleans Saints at San Diego Chargers – Game summary

Quarter	1	2	3	4	Total
Saints	7	7	7	14	35
Chargers	7	17	0	10	34

at Qualcomm Stadium, San Diego, California

- Date: October 2
- Game time: 3:25 p.m. CDT/1:25 p.m. PDT
- Game weather: 74 °F (23 °C), fair
- Game attendance: 60,641
- Referee: Walt Coleman
- TV announcers (Fox): Chris Myers, Ronde Barber and Jennifer Hale
- Recap, Gamebook

Game information

First quarter

- NO – Mark Ingram II 1-yard run (Wil Lutz kick), 10:32. Saints 7–0. Drive: 11 plays, 75 yards, 4:28.
- SD – Hunter Henry 20-yard pass from Philip Rivers (Josh Lambo kick), 1:10. Tied 7–7. Drive: 7 plays, 62 yards, 3:30.

Second quarter

- NO – John Kuhn 4-yard pass from Drew Brees (Wil Lutz kick), 9:20. Saints 14–7. Drive: 14 plays, 75 yards, 6:50.
- SD – Dontrelle Inman 57-yard pass from Philip Rivers (Josh Lambo kick), 7:04. Tied 14–14. Drive: 4 plays, 75 yards, 2:16.
- SD – Josh Lambo 30-yard field goal, 4:50. Chargers 17–14. Drive: 5 plays, 29 yards, 2:05.
- SD – Melvin Gordon 1-yard run (Josh Lambo kick), 0:13. Chargers 24–14. Drive: 11 plays, 47 yards, 2:14.

Third quarter

- NO – John Kuhn 1-yard run (Wil Lutz kick), 9:00. Chargers 24–21. Drive: 9 plays, 48 yards, 4:18.

Fourth quarter

- SD – Melvin Gordon 1-yard run (Josh Lambo kick), 12:15. Chargers 31–21. Drive: 14 plays, 74 yards, 6:28.
- SD – Josh Lambo 47-yard field goal, 8:39. Chargers 34–21. Drive: 6 plays, −3 yards, 2:48.
- NO – Michael Thomas 5-yard pass from Drew Brees (Wil Lutz kick), 4:50. Chargers 34–28. Drive: 4 plays, 13 yards, 1:50.
- NO – John Kuhn 1-yard run (Wil Lutz kick), 1:57. Saints 35–34. Drive: 7 plays, 31 yards, 2:45.

Top passers

- NO – Drew Brees – 23/36, 207 yards, 2 TD, 2 INT
- SD – Philip Rivers – 28/43, 321 yards, 2 TD, INT

Top rushers

- NO – Mark Ingram II – 18 rushes, 56 yards, TD
- SD – Melvin Gordon – 19 rushes, 36 yards, 2 TD

Top receivers

- NO – Mark Ingram II – 6 receptions, 49 yards
- SD – Dontrelle Inman – 7 receptions, 120 yards, TD

For the first time in 11 years, Drew Brees returned to San Diego to face his former team, the Chargers, where he began his NFL career. In the game, the Saints got their first win of the season, rallying in the 4th quarter after trailing 34–21 to win 35–34, mostly due to two key fumbles by the Chargers.

==== Week 6: vs. Carolina Panthers ====
Week Six: Carolina Panthers at New Orleans Saints – Game summary

Quarter	1	2	3	4	Total
Panthers	0	10	7	21	38
Saints	14	10	7	10	41

at Mercedes-Benz Superdome, New Orleans, Louisiana

- Date: October 16
- Game time: 12:00 p.m. CDT
- Game weather: Played indoors (dome stadium)
- Game attendance: 73,138
- Referee: Walt Anderson
- TV announcers (Fox): Sam Rosen, Daryl Johnston and Laura Okmin
- Recap, Gamebook

Game information

First quarter

- NO – Coby Fleener 2-yard run (Wil Lutz kick), 8:55. Saints 7–0. Drive: 12 plays, 75 yards, 6:05.
- NO – Brandin Cooks 87-yard pass from Drew Brees (Wil Lutz kick), 2:31. Saints 14–0. Drive: 3 plays, 93 yards, 0:57.

Second quarter

- NO – Michael Thomas 9-yard pass from Drew Brees (Wil Lutz kick), 13:47. Saints 21–0. Drive: 4 plays, 29 yards, 1:48.
- CAR – Graham Gano 42-yard field goal, 3:02. Saints 21–3. Drive: 6 plays, 33 yards, 1:09.
- CAR – Devin Funchess 17-yard pass from Cam Newton (Graham Gano kick), 1:15. Saints 21–10. Drive: 5 plays, 63 yards, 1:09.
- NO – Wil Lutz 33-yard field goal, 0:10. Saints 24–10. Drive: 7 plays, 60 yards, 1:05.

Third quarter

- CAR – Ed Dickson 1-yard pass from Cam Newton (Graham Gano kick), 6:49. Saints 24–17. Drive: 12 plays, 60 yards, 4:57.
- NO – Coby Fleener 50-yard pass from Drew Brees (Wil Lutz kick), 4:56. Saints 31–17. Drive: 5 plays, 75 yards, 1:53.

Fourth quarter

- CAR – Jonathan Stewart 2-yard run (Graham Gano kick), 14:49. Saints 31–24. Drive: 3 plays, 50 yards, 1:04.
- CAR – Jonathan Stewart 1-yard run (kick failed, wide right), 9:38. Saints 31–30. Drive: 9 plays, 50 yards, 3:51.
- NO – Josh Hill 8-yard pass from Drew Brees (Wil Lutz kick), 6:02. Saints 38–30. Drive: 8 plays, 75 yards, 3:36.
- CAR – Cam Newton 2-yard run (Cam Newton–Devin Funchess pass), 2:58. Tied 38–38. Drive: 6 plays, 78 yards, 3:04.
- NO – Wil Lutz 52-yard field goal, 0:11. Saints 41–38. Drive: 11 plays, 41 yards, 2:47.

Top passers

- CAR – Cam Newton – 27/47, 322 yards, 2 TD, INT
- NO – Drew Brees – 34/49, 465 yards, 4 TD, INT

Top rushers

- CAR – Jonathan Stewart – 19 rushes, 85 yards, 2 TD
- NO – Mark Ingram II – 16 rushes, 51 yards

Top receivers

- CAR – Greg Olsen – 6 receptions, 94 yards
- NO – Brandin Cooks – 7 receptions, 173 yards, TD

==== Week 7: at Kansas City Chiefs ====
Week Seven: New Orleans Saints at Kansas City Chiefs – Game summary

Quarter	1	2	3	4	Total
Saints	7	0	7	7	21
Chiefs	14	7	3	3	27

at Arrowhead Stadium, Kansas City, Missouri

- Date: October 23
- Game time: 12:00 p.m. CDT
- Game weather: 68 °F (20 °C), sunny
- Game attendance: 76,282
- Referee: Clete Blakeman
- TV announcers (Fox): Kenny Albert, John Lynch and Pam Oliver
- Recap, Gamebook

Game information

First quarter

- NO – Brandin Cooks 9-yard pass from Drew Brees (Wil Lutz kick), 6:07. Saints 7–0. Drive: 10 plays, 80 yards, 4:40.
- KC – Spencer Ware 46-yard pass from Alex Smith (Cairo Santos kick), 4:07. Tied 7–7. Drive: 5 plays, 75 yards, 2:00.
- KC – Daniel Sorensen 48-yard interception return (Cairo Santos kick), 0:46. Chiefs 14–7.

Second quarter

- KC – Tyreek Hill 38-yard pass from Alex Smith (Cairo Santos kick), 7:02. Chiefs 21–7. Drive: 8 plays, 85 yards, 4:58.

Third quarter

- NO – Mark Ingram II 3-yard pass from Drew Brees (Wil Lutz kick), 6:57. Chiefs 21–14. Drive: 14 plays, 75 yards, 8:03.
- KC – Cairo Santos 39-yard field goal, 3:21. Chiefs 24–14. Drive: 7 plays, 42 yards, 3:36.

Fourth quarter

- NO – Brandon Coleman 10-yard pass from Drew Brees (Wil Lutz kick), 2:33. Chiefs 24–21. Drive: 10 plays, 80 yards, 2:27.
- KC – Cairo Santos 41-yard field goal, 0:28. Chiefs 27–21. Drive: 6 plays, 23 yards, 2:05.

Top passers

- NO – Drew Brees – 37/48, 367 yards, 3 TD, INT
- KC – Alex Smith – 17/24, 214 yards, 2 TD

Top rushers

- NO – Mark Ingram II – 16 rushes, 62 yards
- KC – Spencer Ware – 17 rushes, 77 yards

Top receivers

- NO – Michael Thomas – 10 receptions, 130 yards
- KC – Spencer Ware – 2 receptions, 54 yards, TD

==== Week 8: vs. Seattle Seahawks ====
Week Eight: Seattle Seahawks at New Orleans Saints – Game summary

Quarter	1	2	3	4	Total
Seahawks	7	7	3	3	20
Saints	0	13	3	9	25

at Mercedes-Benz Superdome, New Orleans, Louisiana

- Date: October 30
- Game time: 12:00 p.m. CDT
- Game weather: Played indoors (dome stadium)
- Game attendance: 73,188
- Referee: Ed Hochuli
- TV announcers (Fox): Justin Kutcher, Charles Davis, Chris Spielman and Peter Schrager
- Recap, Gamebook

Game information

First quarter

- SEA – Earl Thomas 34-yard fumble return (Steven Hauschka kick), 7:53. Seahawks 7–0.

Second quarter

- NO – Wil Lutz 22-yard field goal, 11:33. Seahawks 7–3. Drive: 15 plays, 83 yards, 7:00.
- SEA – Christine Michael 2-yard run (Steven Hauschka kick), 9:53. Seahawks 14–3. Drive: 4 plays, 75 yards, 1:40.
- NO – Wil Lutz 53-yard field goal, 5:15. Seahawks 14–6. Drive: 10 plays, 40 yards, 4:38.
- NO – Drew Brees 1-yard run (Wil Lutz kick), 0:49. Seahawks 14–13. Drive: 9 plays, 37 yards, 4:13.

Third quarter

- SEA – Steven Hauschka 44-yard field goal, 8:56. Seahawks 17–13. Drive: 11 plays, 49 yards, 6:04.
- NO – Wil Lutz 21-yard field goal, 3:14. Seahawks 17–16. Drive: 11 plays, 74 yards, 5:42.

Fourth quarter

- NO – Brandin Cooks 2-yard pass from Drew Brees (pass failed), 12:24. Saints 22–17. Drive: 9 plays, 71 yards, 4:27.
- SEA – Steven Hauschka 21-yard field goal, 6:38. Saints 22–20. Drive: 13 plays, 72 yards, 5:46.
- NO – Wil Lutz 41-yard field goal, 1:57. Saints 25–20. Drive: 11 plays, 52 yards, 4:41.

Top passers

- SEA – Russell Wilson – 22/34, 253 yards, INT
- NO – Drew Brees – 27/35, 265 yards, TD

Top rushers

- SEA – Christine Michael – 10 rushes, 40 yards, TD
- NO – Tim Hightower – 26 rushes, 102 yards

Top receivers

- SEA – C. J. Prosise – 4 receptions, 80 yards
- NO – Michael Thomas – 6 receptions, 63 yards

The Saints meet the Seahawks for the first time in 3 years. It was also the Saints' first victory against Seattle since the 2010 season.

==== Week 9: at San Francisco 49ers ====
Week Nine: New Orleans Saints at San Francisco 49ers – Game summary

Quarter	1	2	3	4	Total
Saints	14	17	0	10	41
49ers	3	17	3	0	23

at Levi's Stadium, Santa Clara, California

- Date: November 6
- Game time: 3:05 p.m. CST/1:05 p.m. PST
- Game weather: 70 °F (21 °C), mostly sunny
- Game attendance: 70,178
- Referee: Jerome Boger
- TV announcers (Fox): Chris Myers, Ronde Barber and Jennifer Hale
- Recap, Gamebook

Game information

First quarter

- SF – Phil Dawson 49-yard field goal, 9:25. 49ers 3–0. Drive: 7 plays, 45 yards, 2:53.
- NO – Tim Hightower 4-yard run (Wil Lutz kick), 5:11. Saints 7–3. Drive: 10 plays, 83 yards, 4:14.
- NO – Michael Thomas 1-yard pass from Drew Brees (Wil Lutz kick), 2:14. Saints 14–3. Drive: 5 plays, 12 yards, 1:22.

Second quarter

- NO – Mark Ingram II 5-yard pass from Drew Brees (Wil Lutz kick), 7:40. Saints 21–3. Drive: 12 plays, 76 yards, 6:05.
- SF – DuJuan Harris 47-yard pass from Colin Kaepernick (Phil Dawson kick), 5:56. Saints 21–10. Drive: 4 plays, 65 yards, 1:44.
- NO – Mark Ingram II 75-yard run (Wil Lutz kick), 5:45. Saints 28–10. Drive: 1 play, 75 yards, 0:11.
- SF – Phil Dawson 48-yard field goal, 3:53. Saints 28–13. Drive: 5 plays, 37 yards, 1:52.
- SF – Vance McDonald 65-yard pass from Colin Kaepernick (Phil Dawson kick), 1:05. Saints 28–20. Drive: 3 plays, 72 yards, 0:42.
- NO – Wil Lutz 26-yard field goal, 0:00. Saints 31–20. Drive: 6 plays, 71 yards, 1:05.

Third quarter

- SF – Phil Dawson 46-yard field goal, 9:07. Saints 31–23. Drive: 6 plays, 29 yards, 1:07.

Fourth quarter

- NO – Michael Thomas 32-yard pass from Drew Brees (Wil Lutz kick), 13:13. Saints 38–23. Drive: 7 plays, 77 yards, 3:23.
- NO – Wil Lutz 41-yard field goal, 8:52. Saints 41–23. Drive: 10 plays, 53 yards, 4:02.

Top passers

- NO – Drew Brees – 28/39, 323 yards, 3 TD
- SF – Colin Kaepernick – 24/39, 398 yards, 2 TD, INT

Top rushers

- NO – Mark Ingram II – 15 rushes, 158 yards, TD
- SF – DuJuan Harris – 10 rushes, 59 yards

Top receivers

- NO – Michael Thomas – 5 receptions, 73 yards, 2 TD
- SF – Quinton Patton – 6 receptions, 106 yards

The Saints travel to Levi's Stadium to match up with the 49ers. For the first time since the 2013 season, the Saints defeated the 49ers.

==== Week 10: vs. Denver Broncos ====
Week Ten: Denver Broncos at New Orleans Saints – Game summary

Quarter	1	2	3	4	Total
Broncos	7	3	0	15	25
Saints	0	3	14	6	23

at Mercedes-Benz Superdome, New Orleans, Louisiana

- Date: November 13
- Game time: 12:00 p.m. CST
- Game weather: Played indoors (dome stadium)
- Game attendance: 73,138
- Referee: Bill Vinovich
- TV announcers (CBS): Jim Nantz, Phil Simms and Tracy Wolfson
- Recap, Gamebook

Game information

First quarter

- DEN – Jordan Taylor 14-yard pass from Trevor Siemian (Brandon McManus kick), 5:45. Broncos 7–0. Drive: 13 plays, 85 yards, 7:15.

Second quarter

- DEN – Brandon McManus 50-yard field goal, 13:42. Broncos 10–0. Drive: 4 plays, 7 yards, 1:11.
- NO – Wil Lutz 30-yard field goal, 0:00. Broncos 10–3. Drive: 5 plays, 50 yards, 0:29.

Third quarter

- NO – Willie Snead 3-yard pass from Drew Brees (Wil Lutz kick), 8:30. Tied 10–10. Drive: 7 plays, 90 yards, 3:50.
- NO – Willie Snead 5-yard pass from Drew Brees (Wil Lutz kick), 3:59. Saints 17–10. Drive: 4 plays, 38 yards, 1:36.

Fourth quarter

- DEN – Demaryius Thomas 2-yard pass from Trevor Siemian (Brandon McManus kick), 9:37. Tied 17–17. Drive: 7 plays, 27 yards, 3:52.
- DEN – Brandon McManus 28-yard field goal, 3:23. Broncos 20–17. Drive: 10 plays, 43 yards, 4:18.
- DEN – Brandon McManus 37-yard field goal, 2:50. Broncos 23–17. Drive: 4 plays, 2 yards, 0:18.
- NO – Brandin Cooks 32-yard pass from Drew Brees, 1:22. Tied 23–23. Drive: 6 plays, 75 yards, 1:28.
- DEN – Will Parks defensive two-point conversion, 1:22. Broncos 25–23.

Top passers

- DEN – Trevor Siemian – 25/40, 258 yards, 2 TD, 2 INT
- NO – Drew Brees – 21/29, 303 yards, 3 TD, 2 INT

Top rushers

- DEN – Devontae Booker – 24 rushes, 76 yards
- NO – Mark Ingram II – 11 plays, 50 yards

Top receivers

- DEN – Demaryius Thomas – 8 receptions, 87 yards, TD
- NO – Brandin Cooks – 3 receptions, 98 yards, TD

==== Week 11: at Carolina Panthers ====
Week Eleven: New Orleans Saints at Carolina Panthers – Game summary

Quarter	1	2	3	4	Total
Saints	3	0	0	17	20
Panthers	3	17	3	0	23

at Bank of America Stadium, Charlotte, North Carolina

- Date: November 17
- Game time: 8:25 p.m. EST/7:25 p.m. CST
- Game weather: 63 °F (17 °C), clear
- Game attendance: 73,288
- Referee: Pete Morelli
- TV announcers (NBC/NFLN/Twitter): Al Michaels, Cris Collinsworth and Heather Cox
- Recap, Gamebook

Game information

First quarter

- CAR – Graham Gano 32-yard field goal, 8:29. Panthers 3–0. Drive: 11 plays, 18 yards, 4:46.
- NO – Wil Lutz 27-yard field goal, 0:36. Tied 3–3. Drive: 14 plays, 71 yards, 7:53.

Second quarter

- CAR – Jonathan Stewart 1-yard run (Graham Gano kick), 5:40. Panthers 10–3. Drive: 8 plays, 34 yards, 3:37.
- CAR – Graham Gano 49-yard field goal, 2:50. Panthers 13–3. Drive: 5 plays, 19 yards, 1:22.
- CAR – Ted Ginn Jr. 40-yard pass from Cam Newton (Graham Gano kick), 0:16. Panthers 20–3. Drive: 1 play, 40 yards, 0:07.

Third quarter

- CAR – Graham Gano 42-yard field goal, 8:17. Panthers 23–3. Drive: 14 plays, 51 yards, 6:43.

Fourth quarter

- NO – Wil Lutz 30-yard field goal, 14:56. Panthers 23–6. Drive: 16 plays, 58 yards, 8:21.
- NO – Brandon Coleman 9-yard pass from Drew Brees (Wil Lutz kick), 11:22. Panthers 23–13. Drive: 4 plays, 51 yards, 1:37.
- NO – Coby Fleener 8-yard pass from Drew Brees (Wil Lutz kick), 2:52. Panthers 23–20. Drive: 13 plays, 76 yards, 5:11.

Top passers

- NO – Drew Brees – 35/44, 285 yards, 2 TD, INT
- CAR – Cam Newton – 14/33, 192 yards, TD

Top rushers

- NO – Tim Hightower – 12 rushes, 69 yards
- CAR – Jonathan Stewart – 18 rushes, 31 yards

Top receivers

- NO – Michael Thomas – 5 receptions, 68 yards
- CAR – Kelvin Benjamin – 3 receptions, 56 yards

As part of Color Rush, the Saints wore all-white uniforms for this game, inspired by the ones they wore in 1975. Due to this, it was the first time the Saints have worn white pants since 1985 and the second season they wore all-white uniforms in franchise history, the first being the 1975 season. The Saints went into the fourth quarter with a 20-point deficit to the Panthers. The Saints rallied and got within three with 5:11 left to go in the game, but the Panthers were able to hold them off.

==== Week 12: vs. Los Angeles Rams ====
Week Twelve: Los Angeles Rams at New Orleans Saints – Game summary

Quarter	1	2	3	4	Total
Rams	7	14	0	0	21
Saints	7	21	14	7	49

at Mercedes-Benz Superdome, New Orleans, Louisiana

- Date: November 27
- Game time: 12:00 p.m. CST
- Game weather: Played indoors (dome stadium)
- Game attendance: 73,067
- Referee: John Hussey
- TV announcers (Fox): Chris Myers, Ronde Barber and Jennifer Hale
- Recap, Gamebook

Game information

First quarter

- LA – Tavon Austin 24-yard pass from Jared Goff (Greg Zuerlein kick), 12:08. Rams 7–0. Drive: 6 plays, 75 yards, 2:52.
- NO – Brandon Coleman 3-yard pass from Drew Brees (Wil Lutz kick), 2:45. Tied 7–7. Drive: 9 plays, 51 yards, 4:33.

Second quarter

- LA – Kenny Britt 6-yard pass from Jared Goff (Greg Zuerlein kick), 14:43. Rams 14–7. Drive: 1 play, 6 yards, 0:04.
- NO – Mark Ingram II 10-yard run (Wil Lutz kick), 9:38. Tied 14–14. Drive: 9 plays, 75 yards, 5:05.
- NO – Drew Brees 1-yard run (Wil Lutz kick), 7:46. Saints 21–14. Drive: 4 plays, 10 yards, 1:39.
- NO – Michael Thomas 6-yard pass from Drew Brees (Wil Lutz kick), 2:24. Saints 28–14. Drive: 8 plays, 78 yards, 3:45.
- LA – Lance Kendricks 15-yard pass from Jared Goff (Greg Zuerlein kick), 0:55. Saints 28–21. Drive: 8 plays, 79 yards, 1:29.

Third quarter

- NO – Mark Ingram II 21-yard pass from Drew Brees (Wil Lutz kick), 12:58. Saints 35–21. Drive: 4 plays, 75 yards, 2:02.
- NO – Michael Thomas 21-yard pass from Drew Brees (Wil Lutz kick), 3:42. Saints 42–21. Drive: 7 plays, 92 yards, 3:17.

Fourth quarter

- NO – Tim Hightower 50-yard pass from Willie Snead IV (Wil Lutz kick), 10:15. Saints 49–21. Drive: 7 plays, 81 yards, 4:45.

Top passers

- LA – Jared Goff – 20/32, 214 yards, 3 TD, INT
- NO – Drew Brees – 28/36, 310 yards, 4 TD

Top rushers

- LA – Todd Gurley – 13 rushes, 50 yards
- NO – Mark Ingram II – 14 rushes, 146 yards, TD

Top receivers

- LA – Kenny Britt – 5 receptions, 52 yards, TD
- NO – Michael Thomas – 9 receptions, 108 yards, 2 TD

The Saints were able to defeat the Rams for the first time since the 2010 season, putting up a season-high 555 yards. Some would see the Saints running up the score as a measure of revenge against their former defensive coordinator Gregg Williams, the main responsible for Bountygate, who now held that position with the Rams.

==== Week 13: vs. Detroit Lions ====
Week Thirteen: Detroit Lions at New Orleans Saints – Game summary

Quarter	1	2	3	4	Total
Lions	3	10	6	9	28
Saints	0	6	0	7	13

at Mercedes-Benz Superdome, New Orleans, Louisiana

- Date: December 4
- Game time: 12:00 p.m. CST
- Game weather: Played indoors (dome stadium)
- Game attendance: 73,137
- Referee: Clete Blakeman
- TV announcers (Fox): Chris Myers, Ronde Barber and Jennifer Hale
- Recap, Gamebook

Game information

First quarter

- DET – Matt Prater 27-yard field goal, 8:14. Lions 3–0. Drive: 9 plays, 44 yards, 5:09.

Second quarter

- DET – Theo Riddick 1-yard pass from Matthew Stafford (Matt Prater kick), 13:03. Lions 10–0. Drive: 11 plays, 92 yards, 7:25.
- NO – Wil Lutz 40-yard field goal, 5:05. Lions 10–3. Drive: 6 plays, 26 yards, 3:45.
- DET – Matt Prater 29-yard field goal, 0:56. Lions 13–3. Drive: 12 plays, 64 yards, 4:09.
- NO – Wil Lutz 32-yard field goal, 0:00. Lions 13–6. Drive: 6 plays, 75 yards, 0:56.

Third quarter

- DET – Matt Prater 32-yard field goal, 8:57. Lions 16–6. Drive: 10 plays, 63 yards, 6:03.
- DET – Matt Prater 27-yard field goal, 1:42. Lions 19–6. Drive: 11 plays, 45 yards, 4:33.

Fourth quarter

- NO – John Kuhn 1-yard run (Wil Lutz kick), 13:32. Lions 19–13. Drive: 7 plays, 75 yards, 3:10.
- DET – Golden Tate 66-yard pass from Matthew Stafford (pass failed), 11:38. Lions 25–13. Drive: 5 plays, 78 yards, 1:54.
- DET – Matt Prater 52-yard field goal, 7:10. Lions 28–13. Drive: 6 plays, 21 yards, 3:06.

Top passers

- DET – Matthew Stafford – 30/42, 341 yards, 2 TD
- NO – Drew Brees – 31/44, 326 yards, 3 INT

Top rushers

- DET – Zach Zenner – 9 rushes, 40 yards
- NO – Mark Ingram II – 7 rushes, 37 yards

Top receivers

- DET – Golden Tate – 8 receptions, 145 yards, TD
- NO – Coby Fleener – 5 receptions, 86 yards

To celebrate 50 seasons in the NFL, the Saints wore special 1967–75 throwback uniforms. It was only worn for this game.

==== Week 14: at Tampa Bay Buccaneers ====
Week Fourteen: New Orleans Saints at Tampa Bay Buccaneers – Game summary

Quarter	1	2	3	4	Total
Saints	0	8	3	0	11
Buccaneers	3	10	0	3	16

at Raymond James Stadium, Tampa, Florida

- Date: December 11
- Game time: 4:25 p.m. EST/3:25 p.m. CST
- Game weather: 79 °F (26 °C), cloudy
- Game attendance: 62,140
- Referee: Walt Anderson
- TV announcers (Fox): Thom Brennaman, Charles Davis, Chris Spielman and Peter Schrager
- Recap, Gamebook

Game information

First quarter

- TB – Roberto Aguayo 41-yard field goal, 8:05. Buccaneers 3–0. Drive: 9 plays, 48 yards, 3:00.

Second quarter

- TB – Doug Martin 1-yard run (Roberto Aguayo kick), 14:50. Buccaneers 10–0. Drive: 11 plays, 75 yards, 6:37.
- TB – Roberto Aguayo 39-yard field goal, 8:26. Buccaneers 13–0. Drive: 10 plays, 50 yards, 4:45.
- NO – Wil Lutz 42-yard field goal, 5:29. Buccaneers 13–3. Drive: 7 plays, 52 yards, 2:57.
- NO – Doug Martin tackled in the end zone by Paul Kruger for a safety, 5:20. Buccaneers 13–5.
- NO – Wil Lutz 34-yard field goal, 0:00. Buccaneers 13–8. Drive: 14 plays, 35 yards, 5:20.

Third quarter

- NO – Wil Lutz 22-yard field goal, 3:35. Buccaneers 13–11. Drive: 11 plays, 76 yards, 5:29.

Fourth quarter

- TB – Roberto Aguayo 26-yard field goal, 12:46. Buccaneers 16–11. Drive: 13 plays, 68 yards, 5:49.

Top passers

- NO – Drew Brees – 25/41, 257 yards, 3 INT
- TB – Jameis Winston – 16/26, 184 yards

Top rushers

- NO – Tim Hightower – 6 rushes, 31 yards
- TB – Doug Martin – 23 rushes, 66 yards, TD

Top receivers

- NO – Willie Snead IV – 6 receptions, 85 yards
- TB – Cameron Brate – 4 receptions, 47 yards

==== Week 15: at Arizona Cardinals ====
Week Fifteen: New Orleans Saints at Arizona Cardinals – Game summary

Quarter	1	2	3	4	Total
Saints	10	14	3	21	48
Cardinals	7	13	7	14	41

at University of Phoenix Stadium, Glendale, Arizona

- Date: December 18
- Game time: 3:05 p.m. CST/2:05 p.m. MST
- Game weather: Played indoors (retractable roof closed)
- Game attendance: 65,072
- Referee: Carl Cheffers
- TV announcers (Fox): Chris Myers, Ronde Barber and Jennifer Hale
- Recap, Gamebook

Game information

First quarter

- ARI – Kerwynn Williams 49-yard run (Chandler Catanzaro kick), 12:27. Cardinals 7–0. Drive: 6 plays, 78 yards, 2:33.
- NO – Wil Lutz 37-yard field goal, 5:27. Cardinals 7–3. Drive: 14 plays, 56 yards, 7:00.
- NO – Travaris Cadet 10-yard pass from Drew Brees (Wil Lutz kick), 1:33. Saints 10–7. Drive: 7 plays, 30 yards, 2:59.

Second quarter

- ARI – Calais Campbell 53-yard fumble return (kick failed, wide left), 7:08. Cardinals 13–10.
- NO – Brandin Cooks 65-yard pass from Drew Brees (Wil Lutz kick), 6:11. Saints 17–13. Drive: 2 plays, 77 yards, 0:57.
- NO – Brandin Cooks 45-yard pass from Drew Brees (Wil Lutz kick), 1:51. Saints 24–13. Drive: 5 plays, 62 yards, 1:41.
- ARI – J. J. Nelson 10-yard pass from Carson Palmer (Chandler Catanzaro kick), 0:40. Saints 24–20. Drive: 8 plays, 80 yards, 1:11.

Third quarter

- NO – Wil Lutz 39-yard field goal, 6:06. Saints 27–20. Drive: 14 plays, 68 yards, 5:57.
- ARI – David Johnson 2-yard run (Chandler Catanzaro kick), 3:19. Tied 27–27. Drive: 5 plays, 62 yards, 2:47.

Fourth quarter

- NO – Tim Hightower 3-yard run (Wil Lutz kick), 12:59. Saints 34–27. Drive: 10 plays, 75 yards, 5:20.
- ARI – David Johnson 7-yard run (Chandler Catanzaro kick), 8:57. Tied 34–34. Drive: 7 plays, 75 yards, 4:02.
- NO – Michael Thomas 4-yard pass from Drew Brees (Wil Lutz kick), 5:33. Saints 41–34. Drive: 7 plays, 75 yards, 3:24.
- NO – Tim Hightower 2-yard run (Wil Lutz kick), 3:27. Saints 48–34. Drive: 6 plays, 29 yards, 1:46.
- ARI – John Brown 30-yard pass from Carson Palmer (Chandler Catanzaro kick), 2:19. Saints 48–41. Drive: 7 plays, 75 yards, 1:08.

Top passers

- NO – Drew Brees – 37/48, 389 yards, 4 TD
- ARI – Carson Palmer – 28/40, 318 yards, 2 TD

Top rushers

- NO – Mark Ingram II – 17 rushes, 78 yards
- ARI – Kerwynn Williams – 3 rushes, 63 yards, TD

Top receivers

- NO – Brandin Cooks – 7 receptions, 186 yards, 2 TD
- ARI – John Brown – 5 receptions, 81 yards, TD

With the win against Arizona, the Saints improved to 6–8. This also marked the only season in which the Saints swept the NFC West division.

==== Week 16: vs. Tampa Bay Buccaneers ====
Week Sixteen: Tampa Bay Buccaneers at New Orleans Saints – Game summary

Quarter	1	2	3	4	Total
Buccaneers	0	7	14	3	24
Saints	7	6	15	3	31

at Mercedes-Benz Superdome, New Orleans, Louisiana

- Date: December 24
- Game time: 3:25 p.m. CST
- Game weather: Played indoors (dome stadium)
- Game attendance: 73,177
- Referee: Jerome Boger
- TV announcers (Fox): Kenny Albert, Daryl Johnston and Laura Okmin
- Recap, Gamebook

Game information

First quarter

- NO – Mark Ingram II 6-yard run (Wil Lutz kick), 0:57. Saints 7–0. Drive: 11 plays, 91 yards, 6:32.

Second quarter

- TB – Cameron Brate 12-yard pass from Jameis Winston (Roberto Aguayo kick), 10:50. Tied 7–7. Drive: 4 plays, 39 yards, 1:13.
- NO – Wil Lutz 42-yard field goal, 6:45. Saints 10–7. Drive: 10 plays, 51 yards, 4:05.
- NO – Wil Lutz 34-yard field goal, 0:00. Saints 13–7. Drive: 10 plays, 57 yards, 3:38.

Third quarter

- NO – Mark Ingram II 14-yard run (Wil Lutz kick), 14:01. Saints 20–7. Drive: 1 play, 14 yards, 0:05.
- TB – Jacquizz Rodgers 3-yard run (Roberto Aguayo kick), 8:38. Saints 20–14. Drive: 10 plays, 75 yards, 5:23.
- NO – Travaris Cadet 11-yard pass from Drew Brees (Mark Ingram II run), 6:20. Saints 28–14. Drive: 6 plays, 75 yards, 2:18.
- TB – Mike Evans 34-yard pass from Jameis Winston (Roberto Aguayo kick), 1:52. Saints 28–21. Drive: 8 plays, 75 yards, 4:28.

Fourth quarter

- NO – Wil Lutz 21-yard field goal, 11:55. Saints 31–21. Drive: 11 plays, 72 yards, 4:57.
- TB – Roberto Aguayo 35-yard field goal, 2:00. Saints 31–24. Drive: 10 plays, 40 yards, 2:33.

Top passers

- TB – Jameis Winston – 23/35, 277 yards, 2 TD, 2 INT
- NO – Drew Brees – 23/34, 299 yards, TD

Top rushers

- TB – Jacquizz Rodgers – 15 rushes, 63 yards, TD
- NO – Mark Ingram II – 18 rushes, 90 yards, 2 TD

Top receivers

- TB – Mike Evans – 7 receptions, 97 yards, TD
- NO – Brandin Cooks – 5 receptions, 98 yards

==== Week 17: at Atlanta Falcons ====
Week Seventeen: New Orleans Saints at Atlanta Falcons – Game summary

Quarter	1	2	3	4	Total
Saints	10	3	0	19	32
Falcons	14	21	3	0	38

at Georgia Dome, Atlanta, Georgia

- Date: January 1, 2017
- Game time: 4:25 p.m. EST/3:25 p.m. CST
- Game weather: Played indoors (dome stadium)
- Game attendance: 70,835
- Referee: Ronald Torbert
- TV announcers (Fox): Kenny Albert, Daryl Johnston and Laura Okmin
- Recap, Gamebook

Game information

First quarter

- ATL – Tevin Coleman 7-yard pass from Matt Ryan (Matt Bryant kick), 11:55. Falcons 7–0. Drive: 4 plays, 68 yards, 2:11.
- NO – Wil Lutz 19-yard field goal, 3:53. Falcons 7–3. Drive: 15 plays, 74 yards, 8:02.
- ATL – Devonta Freeman 75-yard run (Matt Bryant kick), 3:42. Falcons 14–3. Drive: 1 play, 75 yards, 0:11.
- NO – Tim Hightower 2-yard run (Wil Lutz kick), 0:52. Falcons 14–10. Drive: 7 plays, 75 yards, 2:50.

Second quarter

- ATL – Julio Jones 1-yard pass from Matt Ryan (Matt Bryant kick), 14:17. Falcons 21–10. Drive: 4 plays, 75 yards, 1:35.
- ATL – Mohamed Sanu 10-yard pass from Matt Ryan (Matt Bryant kick), 6:51. Falcons 28–10. Drive: 10 plays, 76 yards, 5:41.
- NO – Wil Lutz 40-yard field goal, 3:40. Falcons 28–13. Drive: 7 plays, 53 yards, 3:11.
- ATL – Justin Hardy 7-yard pass from Matt Ryan (Matt Bryant kick), 0:32. Falcons 35–13. Drive: 9 plays, 75 yards, 3:08.

Third quarter

- ATL – Matt Bryant 22-yard field goal, 5:17. Falcons 38–13. Drive: 14 plays, 95 yards, 5:06.

Fourth quarter

- NO – Michael Thomas 14-yard pass from Drew Brees (run failed), 12:41. Falcons 38–19. Drive: 7 plays, 89 yards, 2:11.
- NO – Mark Ingram II 1-yard run (pass failed), 2:47. Falcons 38–25. Drive: 5 plays, 50 yards, 2:18.
- NO – Travaris Cadet 3-yard pass from Drew Brees (Wil Lutz kick), 0:39. Falcons 38–32. Drive: 13 plays, 57 yards, 2:08.

Top passers

- NO – Drew Brees – 29/50, 350 yards, 2 TD, INT
- ATL – Matt Ryan – 27/36, 331 yards, 4 TD

Top rushers

- NO – Mark Ingram II – 20 rushes, 103 yards, TD
- ATL – Devonta Freeman – 12 rushes, 96 yards, TD

Top receivers

- NO – Michael Thomas – 10 receptions, 156 yards, TD
- ATL – Julio Jones – 7 receptions, 96 yards, TD

Because the Saints lost to the Falcons, they finished the season with a 7–9 record for the third straight season. The Saints were also swept by the Falcons for the first time since the 2014 season.

== Standings ==
=== Division ===
NFC South
	W	L	T	PCT	DIV	CONF	PF	PA	STK
^{(2)} Atlanta Falcons	11	5	0	.688	5–1	9–3	540	406	W4
Tampa Bay Buccaneers	9	7	0	.563	4–2	7–5	354	369	W1
New Orleans Saints	7	9	0	.438	2–4	6–6	469	454	L1
Carolina Panthers	6	10	0	.375	1–5	5–7	369	402	L2

=== Conference ===
NFC
#	Team	Division	W	L	T	PCT	DIV	CONF	SOS	SOV	STK
Division leaders
1	Dallas Cowboys	East	13	3	0	.813	3–3	9–3	.471	.440	L1
2	Atlanta Falcons	South	11	5	0	.688	5–1	9–3	.480	.452	W4
3	Seattle Seahawks	West	10	5	1	.656	3–2–1	6–5–1	.441	.425	W1
4	Green Bay Packers	North	10	6	0	.625	5–1	8–4	.508	.453	W6
Wild Cards
5	New York Giants	East	11	5	0	.688	4–2	8–4	.486	.455	W1
6 (Note: Detroit finished ahead of Tampa Bay for the No. 6 seed and qualified for the last playoff spot based on record vs. common opponents—Detroit's cumulative record against Chicago, Dallas, Los Angeles and New Orleans was 3–2, while Tampa Bay's cumulative record against the same four teams was 2–3.)	Detroit Lions	North	9	7	0	.563	3–3	7–5	.475	.392	L3
Did not qualify for the postseason
7	Tampa Bay Buccaneers	South	9	7	0	.563	4–2	7–5	.492	.434	W1
8	Washington Redskins	East	8	7	1	.531	3–3	6–6	.516	.430	L1
9	Minnesota Vikings	North	8	8	0	.500	2–4	5–7	.492	.457	W1
10	Arizona Cardinals	West	7	8	1	.469	4–1–1	6–5–1	.463	.366	W2
11 (Note: New Orleans finished ahead of Philadelphia based on better record vs. conference opponents.)	New Orleans Saints	South	7	9	0	.438	2–4	6–6	.523	.393	L1
12	Philadelphia Eagles	East	7	9	0	.438	2–4	5–7	.559	.518	W2
13	Carolina Panthers	South	6	10	0	.375	1–5	5–7	.518	.354	L2
14	Los Angeles Rams	West	4	12	0	.250	2–4	3–9	.504	.500	L7
15	Chicago Bears	North	3	13	0	.188	2–4	3–9	.521	.396	L4
16	San Francisco 49ers	West	2	14	0	.125	2–4	2–10	.504	.250	L1
Tiebreakers (Note: When breaking ties for three or more teams under the NFL's rules, they are first broken within divisions, then comparing only the highest-ranked remaining team from each division.)
