= Travaris Cadet =

American football player (born 1990)

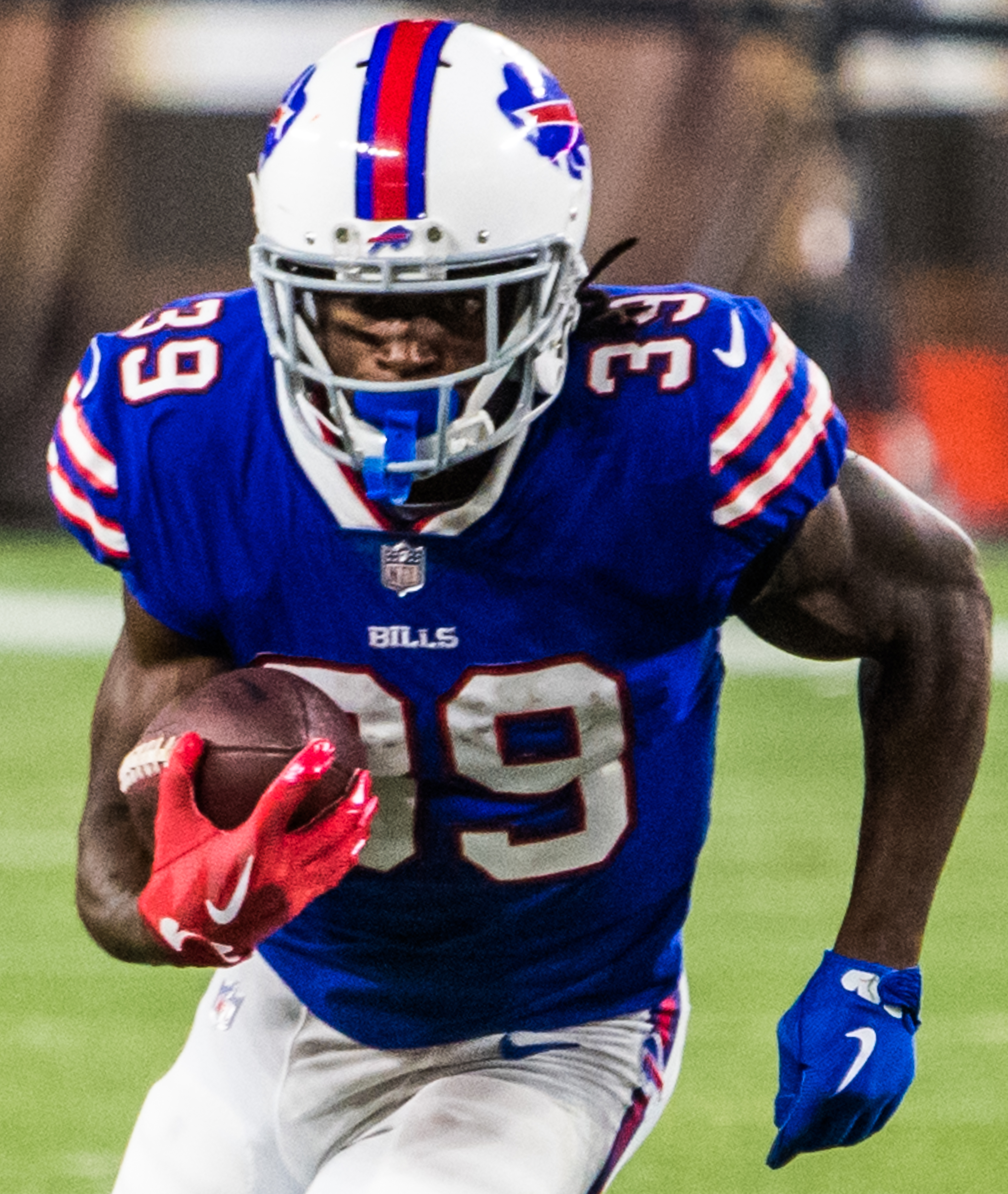
- Cadet with the Buffalo Bills in 2018

No. 39, 32, 38
- Position: Running back

Personal information
- Born: February 1, 1989 (age 37); Miami, Florida, U.S.
- Listed height: 6 ft 1 in (1.85 m)
- Listed weight: 210 lb (95 kg)

Career information
- High school: Miami Central (West Little River, Florida)
- College: Appalachian State
- NFL draft: 2012: undrafted

Career history
- New Orleans Saints (2012–2014); New England Patriots (2015); San Francisco 49ers (2015); New Orleans Saints (2015–2016); New York Jets (2017); Buffalo Bills (2017); Carolina Panthers (2018)

Career NFL statistics
- Rushing yards: 197
- Rushing average: 3.3
- Receptions: 119
- Receiving yards: 964
- Receiving touchdowns: 7
- Stats at Pro Football Reference

Travaris Terrell Cadet (born February 1, 1989) is an American former professional football player who was a running back in the National Football League (NFL). He was signed by the New Orleans Saints as an undrafted free agent in 2012. He played college football for the Appalachian State Mountaineers. He also played for the New England Patriots, San Francisco 49ers, New York Jets, Buffalo Bills and Carolina Panthers.

== Early life ==
Cadet attended and played high school football at Miami Central High School for the Rockets.

== College career ==
Cadet attended the University of Toledo in 2007 and was redshirted. After one year, he transferred to Pearl River Community College. In 2009, he transferred to Appalachian State University. He played for the Mountaineers from 2009 to 2011. In the 2009 season, he finished with 366 rushing yards and three rushing touchdowns. In the 2010 season, he finished with 671 rushing yards and six rushing touchdowns. In the 2011 season, he finished with 651 rushing yards and six rushing touchdowns.

== Professional career ==
Pre-draft measurables
Height	Weight	40-yard dash	10-yard split	20-yard split	20-yard shuttle	Three-cone drill	Vertical jump	Broad jump	Bench press
5 ft 11 5/8 in (1.82 m)	205 lb (93 kg)	4.64 s	1.65 s	2.74 s	4.21 s	6.97 s	33.0 in (0.84 m)	10 ft 0 in (3.05 m)	16 reps
All values from Pro Day

=== New Orleans Saints (first stint) ===
Cadet went undrafted but later signed with the Saints. During Week 9 of the 2012 season, against the Philadelphia Eagles, Cadet made his first and only carry of the season for five yards. He had a 45-yard run, but it was called back because receiver Marques Colston was called for holding. Overall, in the 2012 NFL season, he added five receptions for 44 yards.

In Week 6 of the 2013 NFL season, while the Saints were up against the New England Patriots, Cadet had his first touchdown reception of his career, a three-yard pass from quarterback Drew Brees.

Cadet was set to be a restricted free agent after the 2014 NFL season, but the Saints did not place a tender on him. Overall, in the 2014 season, he finished with 10 rushes for 32 rushing yards and 38 receptions for 296 receiving yards and a receiving touchdown.

=== New England Patriots ===
On March 17, 2015, Cadet was signed by the New England Patriots. Due to injury there was little playing time for Cadet and he was active for only one game before he was released by the Patriots on September 29.

=== San Francisco 49ers ===
On November 10, 2015, Cadet was signed by the San Francisco 49ers. He appeared in four games with the team. On December 22, Cadet was waived by San Francisco.

=== New Orleans Saints (second stint) ===
On December 23, 2015, the Saints claimed Cadet off waivers, reuniting him with his former team. He played in one game in the 2015 season with the team, which was the Week 17 game against the Atlanta Falcons.

Cadet was released by the Saints on September 3, 2016, but re-signed with the team two days later. In the 2016 season, Cadet had 40 receptions for 281 yards and four receiving touchdowns.

On March 15, 2017, Cadet re-signed with the Saints. He was released by New Orleans on September 2.

=== New York Jets ===
On September 27, 2017, Cadet signed with the New York Jets. He appeared in three games with the team. Cadet was released by the Jets on October 24.

=== Buffalo Bills ===
On November 4, 2017, Cadet signed with the Buffalo Bills. In Week 16 against the New England Patriots, Cadet went down on the field with an apparent knee injury. He was carted off the field in an air cast, and left the stadium in a hard cast. It was revealed that he suffered a dislocated ankle and was placed on injured reserve on December 26. Overall, in the 2017 season, with both the Jets and the Bills, he totaled 23 carries for 96 rushing yards and 16 receptions for 119 receiving yards.

On March 16, 2018, Cadet re-signed with the Bills. He was released by Buffalo on September 1.

=== Carolina Panthers ===
On November 12, 2018, the Carolina Panthers signed Cadet on a one-year deal. He had 11 carries for 17 yards in the regular season finale against the New Orleans Saints in his lone appearance of the 2018 season.
