= Vernon Butler =

American football player (born 1994)

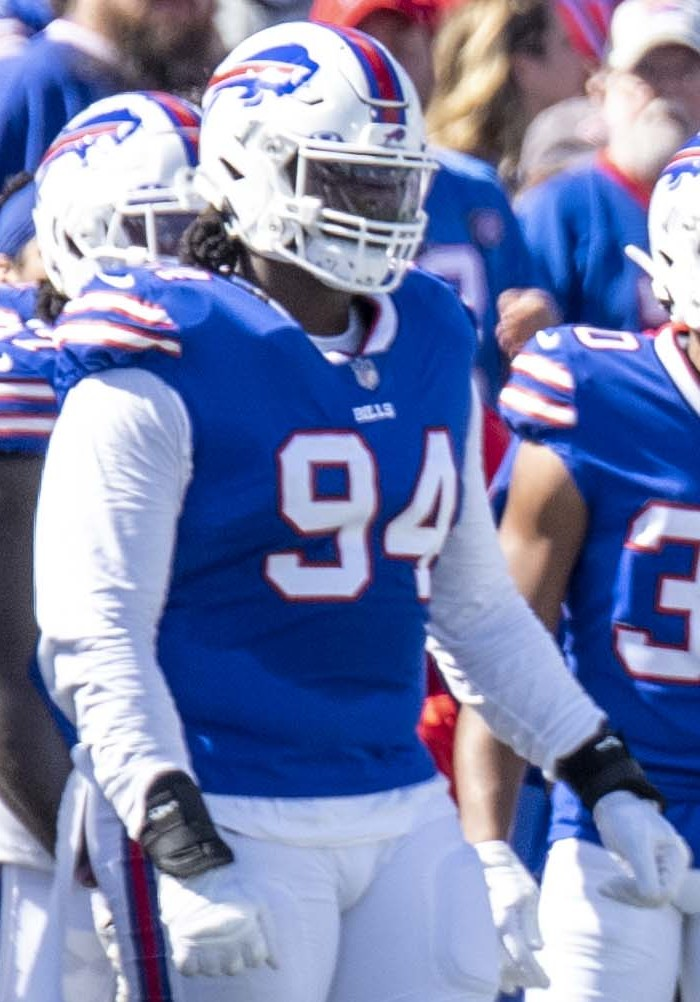
- Butler with the Buffalo Bills in 2021

No. 92, 94, 91
- Position: Nose tackle

Personal information
- Born: June 14, 1994 (age 32); Pike County, Mississippi, U.S.
- Listed height: 6 ft 4 in (1.93 m)
- Listed weight: 325 lb (147 kg)

Career information
- High school: North Pike (Summit, Mississippi)
- College: Louisiana Tech (2012–2015)
- NFL draft: 2016: 1st round, 30th overall pick

Career history
- Carolina Panthers (2016–2019); Buffalo Bills (2020–2021); Las Vegas Raiders (2022)*; New York Giants (2022–2023)*
- * Offseason or practice squad member only

Career NFL statistics
- Total tackles: 110
- Sacks: 8.0
- Forced fumbles: 4
- Fumble recoveries: 2
- Pass deflections: 3
- Stats at Pro Football Reference

Vernon Butler Jr. (born June 14, 1994) is an American former professional football player who was a nose tackle in the National Football League (NFL). He played college football for the Louisiana Tech Bulldogs, and was selected in the first round of the 2016 NFL draft by the Carolina Panthers.

== Early life ==
Butler attended North Pike High School in Summit, Mississippi. He played football, basketball and ran track. As a senior, he had 121 tackles and 13 sacks. Butler committed to Louisiana Tech University to play college football.

== College career ==
As a true freshman at Louisiana Tech in 2012, Butler had 21 tackles. As a sophomore in 2013, he had 43 tackles with one sack and as a junior in 2014, he had 54 tackles and a sack. As a senior in 2015, Butler had 50 tackles with three sacks and was named first team All-Conference USA.

== Professional career ==
Pre-draft measurables
Height	Weight	Arm length	Hand span	40-yard dash	10-yard split	20-yard split	20-yard shuttle	Three-cone drill	Vertical jump	Broad jump	Bench press
6 ft 3 5/8 in (1.92 m)	323 lb (147 kg)	35 1/8 in (0.89 m)	10 3/4 in (0.27 m)	5.33 s	1.87 s	3.07 s	4.76 s	7.82 s	29 1/2 in (0.75 m)	8 ft 8 in (2.64 m)	26 reps
All values from 2016 NFL Scouting Combine.

=== Carolina Panthers ===
Butler was selected in the first round with the 30th overall pick by the Carolina Panthers. He became the highest Louisiana Tech Bulldog selected since Troy Edwards in 1999.

On May 13, 2016, the Panthers signed Butler to a four-year, $8.39 million contract that includes $7.94 million guaranteed and a signing bonus of $4.30 million.

On May 2, 2019, the Panthers declined the fifth-year option on Butler's contract, making him a free agent in 2020. On December 22, Butler was ejected after punching Jack Doyle of the Indianapolis Colts in a 38–6 loss.

=== Buffalo Bills ===
On March 27, 2020, Butler signed a two-year contract with the Buffalo Bills.

=== Las Vegas Raiders ===
Butler signed with the Las Vegas Raiders on March 23, 2022. Butler was released by the Raiders on August 16.

=== New York Giants ===
On November 15, 2022, the New York Giants signed Butler to their practice squad. On December 3, Butler was elevated from the practice squad for the Week 13 game against the Washington Commanders. He signed a reserve/future contract with New York on January 22, 2023. Butler was released by the Giants as a part of final roster cuts on August 30.
