= Brandon Coleman (wide receiver) =

American football player (born 1992)

No. 16
- Position: Wide receiver

Personal information
- Born: June 22, 1992 (age 34); Accokeek, Maryland, U.S.
- Listed height: 6 ft 6 in (1.98 m)
- Listed weight: 225 lb (102 kg)

Career information
- High school: McNamara (Forestville, Maryland)
- College: Rutgers
- NFL draft: 2014: undrafted

Career history
- New Orleans Saints (2014–2017)

Awards and highlights
- Second-team All-Big East (2012)

Career NFL statistics
- Receptions: 79
- Receiving yards: 1,099
- Receiving touchdowns: 8
- Stats at Pro Football Reference

Brandon Coleman (born June 22, 1992) is an American former professional football player who was a wide receiver in the National Football League (NFL). He played college football for the Rutgers Scarlet Knights. He signed with the New Orleans Saints as an undrafted free agent after the 2014 NFL draft.

== Early life ==
Coleman attended Bishop McNamara High School in Forestville, Maryland. As a senior, he had 41 receptions for 838 yards and 10 touchdowns.

== College career ==
As a sophomore at Rutgers in 2012, Coleman had 43 receptions for 718 yards and 10 touchdowns. He was named Second-team All-Big East for the 2012 season. The following season, Coleman recorded 34 receptions, 538 yards, and four touchdowns his junior year with the Scarlet Knights. Coleman entered the 2014 NFL draft after his junior season, however went undrafted.

== Professional career ==
Pre-draft measurables
Height	Weight	Arm length	Hand span	Wingspan	40-yard dash	10-yard split	20-yard split	20-yard shuttle	Three-cone drill	Vertical jump	Bench press
6 ft 6 in (1.98 m)	225 lb (102 kg)	34 in (0.86 m)	9 1/4 in (0.23 m)	6 ft 9 5/8 in (2.07 m)	4.56 s	1.66 s	2.71 s	4.51 s	7.33 s	32.5 in (0.83 m)	21 reps
All values from NFL Combine

On May 10, 2014, he signed with the New Orleans Saints as an undrafted free agent.

Coleman received his first professional start during the Saints 2015 season opener against the Arizona Cardinals. He caught his first career touchdown on a 12-yard pass from Drew Brees in the second quarter. He finished his first career game hauling in four receptions for 41 yards. During a Week 13 matchup against the division-rival Carolina Panthers, he made four receptions for 73 receiving yards and caught his second career touchdown reception. On January 3, 2016, Coleman caught a season-high five passes for 81 receiving yards against the Atlanta Falcons. He finished the 2015 season with 30 receptions, 454 receiving yards, and two touchdowns.

In the 2016 season, Coleman had 26 receptions for 281 yards and three touchdowns in 16 games and four starts.

In Week 2 of the 2017 season against the New England Patriots, Coleman had four receptions for 82 yards and a touchdown in the 36–20 loss. He finished the season with 23 receptions for 364 yards and three touchdowns.

On April 18, 2018, Coleman re-signed with the Saints. He was released with a failed physical on August 5.

On September 2, 2019, Coleman announced his retirement via an Instagram post.
