= Alontae Taylor =

American football player (born 1998)

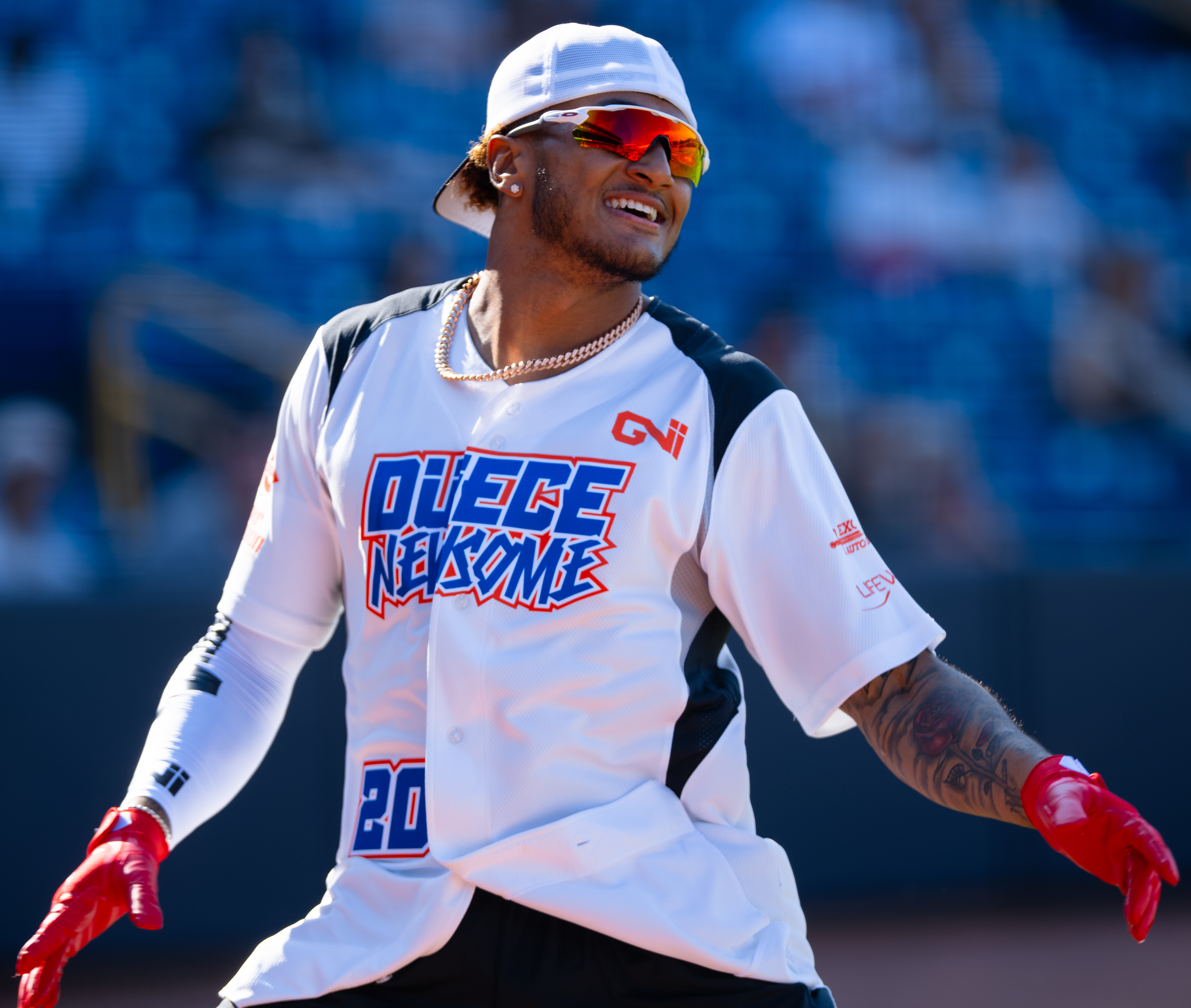
- Taylor in 2023

No. 24 – Tennessee Titans
- Position: Cornerback
- Roster status: Active

Personal information
- Born: December 3, 1998 (age 27); Winchester, Tennessee, U.S.
- Listed height: 6 ft 0 in (1.83 m)
- Listed weight: 199 lb (90 kg)

Career information
- High school: Coffee County Central (Manchester, Tennessee)
- College: Tennessee (2018–2021)
- NFL draft: 2022: 2nd round, 49th overall pick

Career history
- New Orleans Saints (2022–2025); Tennessee Titans (2026–present)

Career NFL statistics as of Week 10, 2026
- Total tackles: 330
- Sacks: 8.0
- Forced fumbles: 4
- Pass deflections: 52
- Interceptions: 4
- Stats at Pro Football Reference

Alontae Devaun Taylor (born December 3, 1998) is an American professional football cornerback for the Tennessee Titans of the National Football League (NFL). He played college football for the Tennessee Volunteers.

== Early life ==
Taylor attended Coffee County Central High School in Manchester, Tennessee. He played quarterback in high school and during his career, he had 8,225 yards of total offense and 75 touchdowns. Taylor played in the 2018 Under Armour All-American Game. He committed to the University of Tennessee to play college football.

== College career ==
Taylor played at Tennessee under head coaches Jeremy Pruitt and Josh Heupel from 2018 to 2021. He originally played wide receiver at Tennessee before transitioning to cornerback prior to his freshman year. He became a starter his freshman year and overall started 31 of 45 career games. Taylor finished his career with 162 tackles, four interceptions, one pick-six, and one fumble recovery for a touchdown. He decided to sit out the 2021 Music City Bowl in preparation for the 2022 NFL draft.

== Professional career ==
Pre-draft measurables
| Height | Weight | Arm length | Hand span | Wingspan | 40-yard dash | 10-yard split | 20-yard split | 20-yard shuttle | Three-cone drill | Vertical jump | Broad jump | Bench press |
|---|---|---|---|---|---|---|---|---|---|---|---|---|
| 6 ft 0 1/8 in (1.83 m) | 199 lb (90 kg) | 32 1/4 in (0.82 m) | 9 1/8 in (0.23 m) | 6 ft 2 3/4 in (1.90 m) | 4.36 s | 1.50 s | 2.52 s | 4.25 s | 7.08 s | 39.0 in (0.99 m) | 11 ft 1 in (3.38 m) | 14 reps |
All values from NFL Combine/Pro Day

=== New Orleans Saints ===
==== 2022 ====
The New Orleans Saints selected Taylor in the second round (49th overall) of the 2022 NFL draft. He was the eighth cornerback selected in 2022.

On July 19, 2022, the Saints signed Taylor to a four–year, $7.20 million rookie contract that includes $3.45 million guaranteed upon signing and an initial signing bonus of $2.41 million.

He entered training camp projected to be a backup cornerback and competed to be the third cornerback on the depth chart against veteran Bradley Roby. Head coach Dennis Allen named him a backup and listed him as the fourth cornerback on the depth chart to begin the season, behind Marshon Lattimore, Paulson Adebo, and Bradley Roby.

On September 11, 2022, Taylor made his professional regular season debut in the New Orleans Saints' season-opener at the Atlanta Falcons, but only saw limited snaps on special teams as they won 27–26. On September 24, 2022, the Saints officially placed Taylor on injured reserve after he injured his knee during practice. On October 20, 2022, the Saints activated him from injured reserve and added him back to their active roster after he was inactive for the last four games (Weeks 3–6). He was immediately named the No. 2 starting cornerback alongside Bradley Roby after Marshon Lattimore was placed on injured reserve due to an abdominal injury he suffered in Week a 5 and Paulson Adebo injured his ankle in Week 6 and was subsequently inactive for Week 7. On October 20, 2022, Taylor earned his first career start and recorded three solo tackles during a 34–42 loss at the Arizona Cardinals. In Week 13, he set a season-high with eight combined tackles (six solo) and made one pass deflection as the Saints lost 16–17 at the Tampa Bay Buccaneers. The following week, Taylor made four solo tackles and tied his season-high of three pass deflections during a 21–18 win against the Atlanta Falcons in Week 14. In his rookie season, Taylor appeared in 13 games, starting the last nine consecutive games and finished with a total of with 46 combined tackles (39 solo) and 11 passes defended.

==== 2023 ====
He entered training camp slated to be a backup cornerback under new defensive coordinator Joe Woods following the departure of Bradley Roby. He also competed for the role as the starting nickelback against Isaac Yiadom and Lonnie Johnson Jr. Head coach Dennis Allen named him the starting nickelback to begin the season and listed him as the third cornerback on the depth chart behind starting tandem Marshon Lattimore and Paulson Adebo.

In Week 3, Taylor earned his first start of the season as a nickelback and recorded five solo tackles, set a career-high with five pass deflections, and had his first career sack on Jordan Love for a 14–yard loss in the second quarter of a 17–18 loss at the Green Bay Packers. In Week 7, he set a season-high with six combined tackles (five solo) as the Saints lost 24–31 against the Jacksonville Jaguars. On December 31, 2023, Taylor made four combined tackles (three solo), one pass deflection, and had his first career interception on a pass by Baker Mayfield to wide receiver Trey Palmer during a 23–13 victory at the Tampa Bay Buccaneers. On January 7, 2024, Taylor made one solo tackle, one pass deflection, and had another interception for back-to-back games after picking off a pass attempt by Desmond Ridder to tight end Kyle Pitts as the Saints routed the Atlanta Falcons 48–17. He appeared in all 17 games during the 2023 NFL season, starting 13 of them and finished the season with 75 combined tackles (56 solo), two interceptions, 14 passes defended, one sack, and one forced fumble.

==== 2024 ====
Entering training camp, Taylor was projected to return as a backup. He competed to be the third cornerback on the depth chart and starting nickelback against 2024 second-round pick Kool-Aid McKinstry. He was named the third cornerback on the depth chart to begin the season, behind starting cornerbacks Paulson Adebo and Marshon Lattimore.

On September 8, 2024, Taylor recorded six combined tackles (five solo), made one pass deflection, and set a new career-high with three sacks on Bryce Young as the Saints routed the Carolina Panthers 47–10. His three sack performance set a Saints franchise record for most sacks in a single game by a defensive back and tied the NFL record. The following week, Taylor set a season-high with nine combined tackles (seven solo) during a 44–19 win at the Dallas Cowboys in Week 2. On October 22, the Saints placed Paulson Adebo on injured reserve for the rest of the season.. Taylor was subsequently named the No. 2 starting cornerback alongside Marshon Lattimore entering Week 8. In Week 9, he recorded four combined tackles (three solo) and set a season-high with three pass deflections as the Saints lost 22–23 at the Carolina Panthers in Week 8. On November 4, 2024, the New Orleans Saints announced their decision to fire head coach Dennis Allen after they fell to a record of 2–7 and appointed special teams coordinator Darren Rizzi to interim head coach for the rest of the season. The following day, the Saints traded starting cornerback Marshon Lattimore to the Washington Commanders, subsequently making Taylor the de facto No. 1 starting cornerback. He started the next two games alongside Shemar Jean-Charles due to rookie Kool-Aid McKinstry sustaining a hamstring injury, rendering him inactive for two games.

He finished the 2024 season with four sacks, 89 tackles, 16 passes defended, and two forced fumbles.

==== 2025 ====
Taylor made 17 appearances (including 16 starts) for New Orleans during the 2025 campaign, recording two interceptions, 11 pass deflections, two sacks, and 83 combined tackles.

=== Tennessee Titans ===
On March 12, 2026, Taylor signed a three-year, $60 million contract with the Tennessee Titans.

== NFL career statistics ==
Legend
| **Bold** | Career high |

=== Regular season ===
| Year | Team | Games | | Tackles | | | | | Interceptions | | | | | | Fumbles | | | |
| Year | Team | GP | GS | Cmb | Solo | Ast | Sck | TFL | PD | Int | Yds | Avg | Lng | TD | FF | FR | Yds | TD |
|---|---|---|---|---|---|---|---|---|---|---|---|---|---|---|---|---|---|---|
| 2022 | NO | 13 | 9 | 46 | 39 | 7 | 0.0 | 1 | 11 | 0 | 0 | 0.0 | 0 | 0 | 0 | 0 | 0 | 0 |
| 2023 | NO | **17** | 13 | 75 | 56 | 19 | 1.0 | 6 | 14 | **2** | 16 | 8.0 | **16** | 0 | 1 | 0 | 0 | 0 |
| 2024 | NO | **17** | 15 | **89** | **61** | **28** | **4.0** | **7** | **16** | 0 | 0 | 0.0 | 0 | 0 | **2** | 0 | 0 | 0 |
| 2025 | NO | **17** | **16** | 83 | 59 | 24 | 2.0 | **7** | 11 | **2** | **21** | **10.5** | 11 | 0 | 0 | 0 | 0 | 0 |
| 2026 | TEN | 7 | 6 | 37 | 28 | 9 | 1.0 | 5 | 0 | 0 | 0 | 0.0 | 0 | 0 | 1 | 0 | 0 | 0 |
| Total | | 71 | 59 | 330 | 243 | 87 | 8.0 | 26 | 52 | 4 | 37 | 9.3 | 16 | 0 | 4 | 0 | 0 | 0 |
