= 2022 New Orleans Saints season =

56th season in franchise history

- Owner: Gayle Benson
- General manager: Mickey Loomis
- Head coach: Dennis Allen
- Offensive coordinator: Pete Carmichael Jr.
- Defensive coordinator: Ryan Nielsen and Kris Richard
- Home stadium: Caesars Superdome

Results
- Record: 7–10
- Division place: 3rd NFC South
- Playoffs: Did not qualify
- All-Pros: LB Demario Davis (2nd team)
- Pro Bowlers: LB Demario Davis; DE Cameron Jordan

Uniform
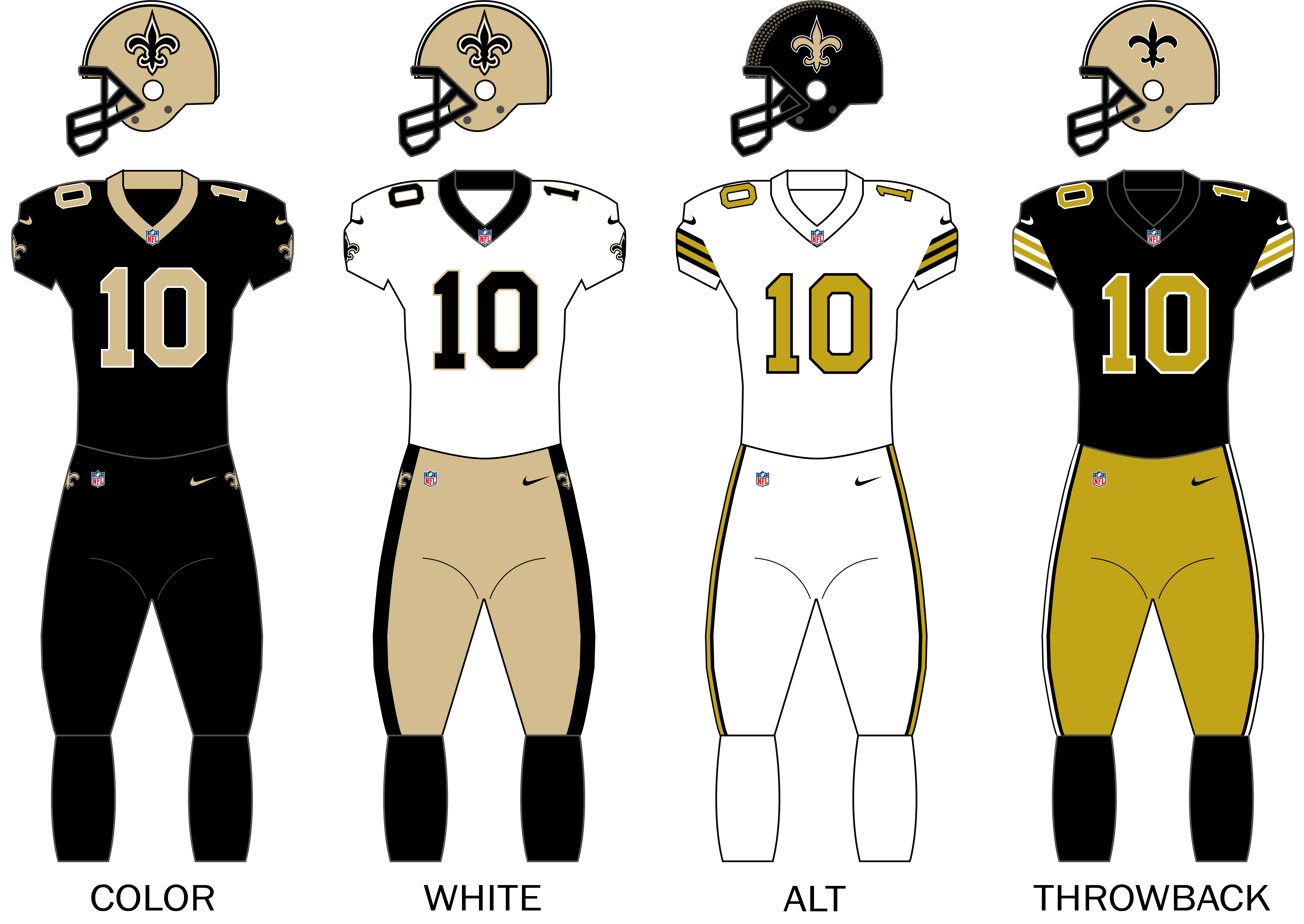

The 2022 season was the New Orleans Saints' 56th in the National Football League (NFL), their 47th playing home games at the Caesars Superdome and their first under head coach Dennis Allen.

Long-time head coach Sean Payton announced his retirement shortly after the Saints 2021 season ended on January 25, 2022. In his 16 years as head coach, Payton led the Saints to seven NFC South titles, nine playoff appearances, and to the franchise's first and only Super Bowl title in Super Bowl XLIV. Prior to his departure, Payton was also the second-longest active tenured head coach in the NFL, only behind Bill Belichick of the New England Patriots. On February 8, 2022, Allen was announced as the next head coach.

The Saints failed to improve from their 9–8 season from last year after a shutout loss to the San Francisco 49ers on the road in Week 12, and failed to match it after another road loss to the Tampa Bay Buccaneers in Week 13 while also clinching their first losing season since 2016. Despite beating the Philadelphia Eagles in Week 17, the Saints were eliminated from playoff contention for the second consecutive season after wins by the Tampa Bay Buccaneers, Detroit Lions, and Green Bay Packers the same week. It was the first time the Saints missed the playoffs in consecutive seasons since missing the playoffs between 2014-2016. Following a season-ending home loss to the division rival Carolina Panthers, the team suffered its first season with double digit losses since 2005.

== Draft ==
2022 New Orleans Saints draft
Round	Selection	Player	Position	College	Notes
1	11	Chris Olave	WR	Ohio State	from Washington (Note: The Saints traded first-, third- and fourth-round selections (16th, 98th and 120th overall) to the Washington Commanders in exchange for a first-round selection (11th overall).)
1	16	Traded to Washington			from Indianapolis via Philadelphia (Note: The Saints traded first-, third- and seventh-round selections (18th, 101st and 237th overall), a 2023 first-round selection and a 2024 second-round selection to the Philadelphia Eagles in exchange for two first- and one sixth-round selection (16th, 19th and 194th overall).)
1	18	Traded to Philadelphia			
1	19	Trevor Penning	OT	Northern Iowa	from Philadelphia
2	49	Alontae Taylor	CB	Tennessee	
3	80	Traded to Houston (Note: The Saints traded a third-round selection (80th overall) and a 2023 conditional sixth-round selection to the Houston Texans in exchange for CB Bradley Roby.)			
3	98	Traded to Washington			
3	101	Traded to Philadelphia			2020 Resolution JC-2A selection (Note: The Saints received a Resolution JC-2A selection in the third round as part of the compensation for pro scouting director Terry Fontenot being hired as the Atlanta Falcons' general manager.)
4	120	Traded to Washington			
5	161	D'Marco Jackson	LB	Appalachian State	
6	194	Jordan Jackson	DE	Air Force	from Indianapolis via Philadelphia
6	—	Selection forfeited (Note: The Saints forfeited their sixth-round selection as a penalty for repeated violations of the league's COVID-19 guidelines.)			
7	237	Traded to Philadelphia			

Draft trades

2022 New Orleans Saints undrafted free agents
Name	Position	College	Ref.
Dai'Jean Dixon	WR	Nicholls	
Sage Doxtater	OT	New Mexico State	
Joel Dublanko	LB	Cincinnati	
DaMarcus Fields	CB	Texas Tech	
Vincent Gray	CB	Michigan	
Lewis Kidd	G	Montana State	
Jack Koerner	S	Iowa	
Lucas Krull	TE	Pittsburgh	
Smoke Monday	S	Auburn	
Isaiah Pryor	LB	Ohio State	
John Parker Romo	K	Virginia Tech	
Derek Schweiger	OT	Iowa State	
Nephi Sewell	LB	Utah	
Rashid Shaheed	WR	Weber State	
Abram Smith	RB	Baylor	
Daniel Whelan	P	UC Davis	
Eric Wilson	G	Penn State	

== Staff ==
2022 New Orleans Saints staff
Front office: Owner – Gayle Benson; President – Dennis Lauscha; Executive vice president/general manager – Mickey Loomis; Senior vice president/chief operating officer – Ben Hales; Asst. general manager/college scouting director – Jeff Ireland; Vice president of football administration – Khai Harley; Director of operations – James Nagaoka; Director of pro scouting – Justin Matthews; Director of pro personnel – Michael Parenton; Head coaches: Head coach – Dennis Allen; Assistant head coach/special teams coordinator – Darren Rizzi; Offensive coaches: Offensive coordinator – Pete Carmichael; Passing game coordinator/quarterbacks – Ronald Curry; Running backs – Joel Thomas; Wide receivers – Kodi Burns; Run game coordinator/tight ends – Dan Roushar; Offensive line – Doug Marrone; Offensive line assistant – Zach Strief; Offensive assistant – Declan Doyle; Assistant to the head coach/offensive assistant – Kevin Petry; Offensive assistant – D. J. Williams; Senior offensive assistant – Bob Bicknell	Defensive coaches: Co-defensive coordinator/defensive line – Ryan Nielsen; Co-defensive coordinator/secondary – Kris Richard; Linebackers – Michael Hodges; Assistant secondary – Cory Robinson; Senior defensive assistant – Peter Giunta; Defensive assistant – Jordan Traylor; Defensive assistant – Sterling Moore; Pass rush specialist – Brian Young; Special teams coaches: Assistant special teams – Phil Galiano; Strength and conditioning: Strength and conditioning coach – Matt Clapp; Director of sports science – Matt Rhea; Assistant strength and conditioning – Charles Byrd; Assistant strength and conditioning – Rob Wenning

== Final roster ==
2022 New Orleans Saints roster
Quarterbacks (QB): 14 Andy Dalton; 2 Jameis Winston; Running backs (RB): 31 Eno Benjamin; 28 David Johnson; 41 Alvin Kamara; 46 Adam Prentice FB; Wide receivers (WR): 1 Marquez Callaway; 18 Keith Kirkwood; 33 Kirk Merritt; 12 Chris Olave; 89 Rashid Shaheed; 10 Tre'Quan Smith; Tight ends (TE): 7 Taysom Hill; 83 Juwan Johnson; 82 Adam Trautman	Offensive linemen (OL): 74 James Hurst T; 66 Lewis Kidd T; 78 Erik McCoy C; 75 Andrus Peat G; 70 Trevor Penning T; 71 Ryan Ramczyk T; 76 Calvin Throckmorton G; 67 Landon Young T; Defensive linemen (DL): 92 Marcus Davenport DE; 96 Carl Granderson DE; 94 Cameron Jordan DE; 90 Tanoh Kpassagnon DE; 93 David Onyemata DT; 97 Malcolm Roach DT; 91 Kentavius Street DT; 98 Payton Turner DE; 99 Shy Tuttle DT	Linebackers (LB): 56 Demario Davis MLB; 50 Andrew Dowell OLB; 55 Kaden Elliss OLB; 42 Chase Hansen OLB; 54 Ty Summers ILB; 20 Pete Werner OLB; Defensive backs (DB): 29 Paulson Adebo CB; 30 Justin Evans FS; 48 J. T. Gray SS; 19 Chris Harris Jr. CB; 23 Marshon Lattimore CB; 32 Tyrann Mathieu FS; 6 Marcus Maye SS; 21 Bradley Roby CB; 25 Daniel Sorensen SS; 27 Alontae Taylor CB; 26 P. J. Williams FS; 34 Isaac Yiadom CB; Special teams (ST): 4 Blake Gillikin P; 3 Wil Lutz K; 49 Zach Wood LS	Practice squad: 68 Josh Andrews G; 15 Kawaan Baker WR; 61 Drew Desjarlais G; 77 Sage Doxtater T; 79 Yasir Durant G (PS/I); 57 Prince Emili DT; 44 Derrick Gore RB; 35 Vincent Gray CB; 88 J. P. Holtz TE; 59 Jordan Jackson DT; 62 Derrick Kelly II T; 87 Lucas Krull TE; 60 Niko Lalos DE; 16 Jake Luton QB; 45 Nephi Sewell MLB; 17 Kevin White WR; 69 Jabari Zuniga DE; Reserve: 53 Zack Baun OLB (IR); 73 Ethan Greenidge G (IR); 11 Deonte Harty WR (IR); 95 Albert Huggins DT (IR); 22 Mark Ingram II RB (IR); 52 D'Marco Jackson MLB (IR); 5 Jarvis Landry WR (IR); 38 Smoke Monday FS (IR); 51 Cesar Ruiz G (IR); 13 Michael Thomas WR (IR); 24 Dwayne Washington RB (IR); Rookies in italics 53 active, 13 reserve, 16 practice squad (1 exempt)

== Preseason ==
The Saints' preseason opponents and schedule was announced in the spring.

Week	Date	Opponent	Result	Record	Venue	Recap
1	August 13	at Houston Texans	L 13–17	0–1	NRG Stadium	Recap
2	August 19	at Green Bay Packers	L 10–20	0–2	Lambeau Field	Recap
3	August 26	Los Angeles Chargers	W 27–10	1–2	Caesars Superdome	Recap

== Regular season ==
=== Schedule ===
On May 4, the NFL announced that the Saints played the Minnesota Vikings during Week 4 on October 2 at Tottenham Hotspur Stadium in London, as part of the league's International Series. The game kickoff at 2:30 p.m. BST/8:30 a.m. CDT, and was televised by the NFL Network, with the Saints serving as the home team.

The remainder of the Saints' 2022 schedule, with exact dates and times, were announced on May 12.

Week	Date	Opponent	Result	Record	Venue	Recap
1	September 11	at **Atlanta Falcons**	**W** 27–26	1–0	Mercedes-Benz Stadium	Recap
2	September 18	**Tampa Bay Buccaneers**	**L** 10–20	1–1	Caesars Superdome	Recap
3	September 25	at **Carolina Panthers**	**L** 14–22	1–2	Bank of America Stadium	Recap
4	October 2	Minnesota Vikings	**L** 25–28	1–3	(United Kingdom) Tottenham Hotspur Stadium (London)	Recap
5	October 9	Seattle Seahawks	**W** 39–32	2–3	Caesars Superdome	Recap
6	October 16	Cincinnati Bengals	**L** 26–30	2–4	Caesars Superdome	Recap
7	October 20	at Arizona Cardinals	**L** 34–42	2–5	State Farm Stadium	Recap
8	October 30	Las Vegas Raiders	**W** 24–0	3–5	Caesars Superdome	Recap
9	November 7	Baltimore Ravens	**L** 13–27	3–6	Caesars Superdome	Recap
10	November 13	at Pittsburgh Steelers	**L** 10–20	3–7	Acrisure Stadium	Recap
11	November 20	Los Angeles Rams	**W** 27–20	4–7	Caesars Superdome	Recap
12	November 27	at San Francisco 49ers	**L** 0–13	4–8	Levi's Stadium	Recap
13	December 5	at **Tampa Bay Buccaneers**	**L** 16–17	4–9	Raymond James Stadium	Recap
14	Bye					
15	December 18	**Atlanta Falcons**	**W** 21–18	5–9	Caesars Superdome	Recap
16	December 24	at Cleveland Browns	**W** 17–10	6–9	First Energy Stadium	Recap
17	January 1	at Philadelphia Eagles	**W** 20–10	7–9	Lincoln Financial Field	Recap
18	January 8	**Carolina Panthers**	**L** 7–10	7–10	Caesars Superdome	Recap

Note: Intra-division opponents are in bold text.

=== Game summaries ===
==== Week 1: at Atlanta Falcons ====
Week 1: New Orleans Saints at Atlanta Falcons – Game summary

Quarter	1	2	3	4	Total
**Saints**	7	0	3	17	**27**
Falcons	3	13	7	3	**26**

at Mercedes-Benz Stadium, Atlanta, Georgia

- Date: September 11
- Game time: 1:00 p.m. EDT/12:00 p.m. CDT
- Game weather: None (retractable roof closed)
- Game attendance: 70,078
- Referee: Alex Kemp
- TV announcers (Fox): Kenny Albert, Jonathan Vilma and Shannon Spake
- Recap, Game Book

Game information

**First quarter**

- ATL – Younghoe Koo 54-yard field goal, 10:40. Falcons 3–0. **Drive: 10 plays, 40 yards, 4:20.**
- NO – Taysom Hill 11-yard run (Wil Lutz kick), 5:44. Saints 7–3. **Drive: 5 plays, 77 yards, 2:02.**

**Second quarter**

- ATL – Cordarrelle Patterson 5-yard run (Younghoe Koo kick), 12:12. Falcons 10–7. **Drive: 9 plays, 66 yards, 5:30.**
- ATL – Younghoe Koo 50-yard field goal, 1:06. Falcons 13–7. **Drive: 7 plays, 50 yards, 2:41.**
- ATL – Younghoe Koo 40-yard field goal, 0:00. Falcons 16–7. **Drive: 4 plays, 39 yards, 0:23.**

**Third quarter**

- NO – Wil Lutz 49-yard field goal, 9:15. Falcons 16–10. **Drive: 11 plays, 44 yards, 5:45.**
- ATL – Marcus Mariota 2-yard run (Younghoe Koo kick), 6:49. Falcons 23–10. **Drive: 5 plays, 75 yards, 2:26.**

**Fourth quarter**

- ATL – Younghoe Koo 27-yard field goal, 12:41. Falcons 26–10. **Drive: 9 plays, 41 yards, 4:00.**
- NO – Michael Thomas 3-yard pass from Jameis Winston (Jameis Winston–Chris Olave pass), 11:12. Falcons 26–18. **Drive: 4 plays, 75 yards, 1:29.**
- NO – Michael Thomas 9-yard pass from Jameis Winston (run failed), 3:38. Falcons 26–24. **Drive: 8 plays, 86 yards, 3:27.**
- NO – Wil Lutz 51-yard field goal, 0:19. Saints 27–26. **Drive: 5 plays, 47 yards, 0:29.**

**Top passers**

- NO – Jameis Winston – 23/34, 269 yards, 2 TD
- ATL – Marcus Mariota – 20/33, 215 yards

**Top rushers**

- NO – Taysom Hill – 4 rushes, 81 yards, TD
- ATL – Cordarrelle Patterson – 22 rushes, 120 yards, TD

**Top receivers**

- NO – Jarvis Landry – 7 receptions, 114 yards
- ATL – Drake London – 5 receptions, 74 yards

Although the Saints trailed by 16 points early in the fourth quarter, Jameis Winston led the team to 17 unanswered points, culminating in a 51-yard game-winning field goal from Wil Lutz. The Falcons had the chance to retake the lead in the last second, but Payton Turner blocked their field goal attempt to seal the win and start off the Saints' season at 1–0.

==== Week 2: vs. Tampa Bay Buccaneers ====
Week 2: Tampa Bay Buccaneers at New Orleans Saints – Game summary

Quarter	1	2	3	4	Total
**Buccaneers**	0	0	3	17	**20**
Saints	3	0	0	7	**10**

at Caesars Superdome, New Orleans, Louisiana

- Date: September 18
- Game time: 12:00 p.m. CDT
- Game weather: None (indoor stadium)
- Game attendance: 70,040
- Referee: Shawn Hochuli
- TV announcers (Fox): Kevin Burkhardt, Greg Olsen, Erin Andrews and Tom Rinaldi
- Recap, Game Book

Game information

**First quarter**

- NO – Wil Lutz 31-yard field goal, 9:02. Saints 3–0. **Drive: 11 plays, 63 yards, 5:58.**

**Second quarter**

- No scoring plays.

**Third quarter**

- TB – Ryan Succop 47-yard field goal, 6:44. Tied 3–3. **Drive: 9 plays, 28 yards, 3:09.**

**Fourth quarter**

- TB – Breshad Perriman 28-yard pass from Tom Brady (Ryan Succop kick), 7:41. Buccaneers 10–3. **Drive: 9 plays, 80 yards, 4:07.**
- TB – Ryan Succop 47-yard field goal, 5:50. Buccaneers 13–3. **Drive: 4 plays, 0 yards, 0:55.**
- TB – Mike Edwards 68-yard interception return (Ryan Succop kick), 4:11. Buccaneers 20–3.
- NO – Michael Thomas 7-yard pass from Jameis Winston (Wil Lutz kick), 3:02. Buccaneers 20–10. **Drive: 6 plays, 75 yards, 1:09.**

**Top passers**

- TB – Tom Brady – 18/34, 190 yards, TD
- NO – Jameis Winston – 25/40, 236 yards, TD, 3 INT

**Top rushers**

- TB – Leonard Fournette – 24 rushes, 65 yards
- NO – Mark Ingram II – 10 rushes, 60 yards

**Top receivers**

- TB – Russell Gage – 5 receptions, 28 yards
- NO – Michael Thomas – 6 receptions, 65 yards, TD

In the fourth quarter, Marshon Lattimore and Mike Evans got into a fight at midfield, resulting in both players being ejected. The Saints lost to Tampa Bay for the first time since the 2018 season, it was also the first time since the 2017 season that they lost to a side quarterbacked by Tom Brady.

==== Week 3: at Carolina Panthers ====
Week 3: New Orleans Saints at Carolina Panthers – Game summary

Quarter	1	2	3	4	Total
Saints	0	0	0	14	**14**
**Panthers**	7	6	0	9	**22**

at Bank of America Stadium, Charlotte, North Carolina

- Date: September 25
- Game time: 1:00 p.m. EDT/12:00 p.m. CDT
- Game weather: Partly cloudy, 68 °F (20 °C)
- Game attendance: 70,496
- Referee: Carl Cheffers
- TV announcers (Fox): Dan Hellie, Matt Millen and Lindsay Czarniak
- Recap, Game Book

Game information

**First quarter**

- CAR – Marquis Haynes 44-yard fumble return (Eddy Piñeiro kick), 5:32. Panthers 7–0.

**Second quarter**

- CAR – Eddy Piñeiro 45-yard field goal, 14:16. Panthers 10–0. **Drive: 10 plays, 40 yards, 5:10.**
- CAR – Eddy Piñeiro 48-yard field goal, 2:56. Panthers 13–0. **Drive: 10 plays, 52 yards, 5:36.**

**Third quarter**

- No scoring plays.

**Fourth quarter**

- NO – Mark Ingram II 5-yard run (Wil Lutz kick), 12:31. Panthers 13–7. **Drive: 10 plays, 89 yards, 3:28.**
- CAR – Laviska Shenault 67-yard pass from Baker Mayfield (run failed), 12:06. Panthers 19–7. **Drive: 2 plays, 67 yards, 0:25.**
- CAR – Eddy Piñeiro 34-yard field goal, 8:19. Panthers 22–7. **Drive: 7 plays, 19 yards, 3:00.**
- NO – Marquez Callaway 4-yard pass from Jameis Winston (Wil Lutz kick), 2:22. Panthers 22–14. **Drive: 3 plays, 90 yards, 1:06.**

**Top passers**

- NO – Jameis Winston – 25/41, 353 yards, TD, 2 INT
- CAR – Baker Mayfield – 12/25, 170 yards, TD

**Top rushers**

- NO – Alvin Kamara – 15 rushes, 61 yards
- CAR – Christian McCaffrey – 25 rushes, 108 yards

**Top receivers**

- NO – Chris Olave – 9 receptions, 147 yards
- CAR – Laviska Shenault – 2 receptions, 90 yards, TD

Even though the Saints scored 14 points in the 4th quarter, they still lost to the Panthers in Week 3 for the first time since the 2015 season.

==== Week 4: vs. Minnesota Vikings ====
NFL London games

Week 4: Minnesota Vikings at New Orleans Saints – Game summary

Quarter	1	2	3	4	Total
**Vikings**	7	6	3	12	**28**
Saints	0	7	7	11	**25**

at Tottenham Hotspur Stadium, London, England

- Date: October 2
- Game time: 2:30 p.m. BST/8:30 a.m. CDT
- Game weather: Partly cloudy, 64 °F (18 °C)
- Game attendance: 60,639
- Referee: Clete Blakeman
- TV announcers (NFLN): Kevin Kugler, Mark Sanchez, Laura Okmin and Stacey Dales
- Recap, Game Book

Game information

**First quarter**

- MIN – Alexander Mattison 15-yard pass from Kirk Cousins (Greg Joseph kick), 8:12. Vikings 7–0. **Drive: 13 plays, 75 yards, 6:48.**

**Second quarter**

- NO – Chris Olave 4-yard pass from Andy Dalton (Wil Lutz kick), 8:57. Tied 7–7. **Drive: 12 plays, 60 yards, 6:13.**
- MIN – Greg Joseph 28-yard field goal, 1:04. Vikings 10–7. **Drive: 9 plays, 46 yards, 2:38.**
- MIN – Greg Joseph 36-yard field goal, 0:00. Vikings 13–7. **Drive: 4 plays, 2 yards, 0:56.**

**Third quarter**

- MIN – Greg Joseph 24-yard field goal, 9:23. Vikings 16–7. **Drive: 5 plays, 38 yards, 2:31.**
- NO – Latavius Murray 1-yard run (Wil Lutz kick), 3:49. Vikings 16–14. **Drive: 12 plays, 78 yards, 5:34.**

**Fourth quarter**

- MIN – Greg Joseph 46-yard field goal, 14:14. Vikings 19–14. **Drive: 9 plays, 28 yards, 4:35.**
- NO – Taysom Hill 2-yard run (Andy Dalton–Jarvis Landry pass), 9:29. Saints 22–19. **Drive: 9 plays, 75 yards, 4:45.**
- MIN – Justin Jefferson 3-yard run (kick failed, wide right), 4:15. Vikings 25–22. **Drive: 10 plays, 75 yards, 5:14.**
- NO – Wil Lutz 60-yard field goal, 1:51. Tied 25–25. **Drive: 8 plays, 33 yards, 2:24.**
- MIN – Greg Joseph 47-yard field goal, 0:24. Vikings 28–25. **Drive: 6 plays, 53 yards, 1:27.**

**Top passers**

- MIN – Kirk Cousins – 25/38, 273 yards, TD, INT
- NO – Andy Dalton – 20/28, 236 yards, TD

**Top rushers**

- MIN – Dalvin Cook – 20 rushes, 76 yards
- NO – Latavius Murray – 11 rushes, 57 yards, TD

**Top receivers**

- MIN – Justin Jefferson – 10 receptions, 147 yards
- NO – Chris Olave – 4 receptions, 67 yards, TD

Hoping to grab a second win, the Saints flew to London to host the Minnesota Vikings. This was the first time the Saints had played in the United Kingdom since the 2017 season and their first International Series game as the home team since 2008. After trailing for most of the game, the Saints took the lead in the fourth quarter through a Taysom Hill touchdown run. Justin Jefferson put the Vikings back in front five minutes later, only for Greg Joseph to miss the extra point, allowing Wil Lutz to tie the game with a career-long 60-yard field goal. Joseph put the Vikings back in front again with a 47-yard kick after a long reception by Jefferson with less than 30 seconds to play, only for a Chris Olave catch to put the Saints in range of another game-tying field goal from 61 yards; however, Lutz's kick bounced back off the left upright and the crossbar to give the Vikings a 28–25 win. It was the Saints' first regular season loss to the Vikings since 2017, giving them their worst start to a season since 2016.

==== Week 5: vs. Seattle Seahawks ====
Week 5: Seattle Seahawks at New Orleans Saints – Game summary

Quarter	1	2	3	4	Total
Seahawks	10	9	0	13	**32**
**Saints**	3	14	14	8	**39**

at Caesars Superdome, New Orleans, Louisiana

- Date: October 9
- Game time: 12:00 p.m. CDT
- Game weather: None (indoor stadium)
- Game attendance: 70,003
- Referee: Brad Allen
- TV announcers (Fox): Brandon Gaudin, Matt Millen and Megan Olivi
- Recap, Game Book

Game information

**First quarter**

- NO – Wil Lutz 56-yard field goal, 9:34. Saints 3–0. **Drive: 10 plays, 41 yards, 5:26.**
- SEA – DK Metcalf 50-yard pass from Geno Smith (Jason Myers kick), 6:41. Seahawks 7–3. **Drive: 5 plays, 75 yards, 2:53.**
- SEA – Jason Myers 56-yard field goal, 1:13. Seahawks 10–3. **Drive: 6 plays, 36 yards, 2:57.**

**Second quarter**

- NO – Taysom Hill 8-yard run (Wil Lutz kick), 10:54. Tied 10–10. **Drive: 10 plays, 69 yards, 5:19.**
- NO – Taysom Hill 9-yard run (Wil Lutz kick), 3:34. Saints 17–10. **Drive: 2 plays, 13 yards, 0:45.**
- SEA – Jason Myers 31-yard field goal, 1:42. Saints 17–13. **Drive: 9 plays, 62 yards, 1:52.**
- SEA – Tyler Lockett 35-yard pass from Geno Smith (kick failed), 0:07. Seahawks 19–17. **Drive: 3 plays, 50 yards, 0:13.**

**Third quarter**

- NO – Chris Olave 16-yard pass from Andy Dalton (Wil Lutz kick), 12:03. Saints 24–19. **Drive: 6 plays, 31 yards, 2:47.**
- NO – Adam Trautman 22-yard pass from Taysom Hill (Wil Lutz kick), 0:36. Saints 31–19. **Drive: 4 plays, 79 yards, 2:10.**

**Fourth quarter**

- SEA – Tyler Lockett 40-yard pass from Geno Smith (pass failed), 14:08. Saints 31–25. **Drive: 3 plays, 75 yards, 1:28.**
- SEA – Kenneth Walker III 69-yard pass from Geno Smith (Jason Myers kick), 6:54. Seahawks 32–31. **Drive: 2 plays, 78 yards, 0:46.**
- NO – Taysom Hill 60-yard run (Mark Ingram II run), 5:22. Saints 39–32. **Drive: 3 plays, 69 yards, 1:32.**

**Top passers**

- SEA – Geno Smith – 16/25, 268 yards, 3 TD
- NO – Andy Dalton – 16/24, 187 yards, TD, INT

**Top rushers**

- SEA – Kenneth Walker III – 8 rushes, 88 yards, TD
- NO – Taysom Hill – 9 rushes, 112 yards, 3 TD

**Top receivers**

- SEA – Tyler Lockett – 5 receptions, 104 yards, 2 TD
- NO – Alvin Kamara – 6 receptions, 91 yards

Following a loss to the Vikings, the Saints returned to the Superdome for a Week 5 matchup against the Seattle Seahawks. Andy Dalton started his second consecutive game at quarterback, but utility player Taysom Hill led New Orleans to a 39–32 victory over the Seahawks. Hill recorded 3 rushing touchdowns, the last of which being a 60-yard run that secured the lead for the Saints. With the win, the Saints improved to 2–3.

==== Week 6: vs. Cincinnati Bengals ====
Week 6: Cincinnati Bengals at New Orleans Saints – Game summary

Quarter	1	2	3	4	Total
**Bengals**	7	7	7	9	**30**
Saints	7	13	3	3	**26**

at Caesars Superdome, New Orleans, Louisiana

- Date: October 16
- Game time: 12:00 p.m. CDT
- Game weather: None (indoor stadium)
- Game attendance: 70,004
- Referee: Land Clark
- TV announcers (CBS): Greg Gumbel, Adam Archuleta and AJ Ross
- Recap, Game Book

Game information

**First quarter**

- NO – Tre'Quan Smith 18-yard pass from Andy Dalton (Wil Lutz kick), 10:33. Saints 7–0. **Drive: 3 plays, 32 yards, 1:25.**
- CIN – Joe Mixon 9-yard pass from Joe Burrow (Evan McPherson kick), 0:45. Tied 7–7. **Drive: 12 plays, 75 yards, 5:55.**

**Second quarter**

- NO – Rashid Shaheed 44-yard run (Wil Lutz kick), 13:39. Saints 14–7. **Drive: 5 plays, 75 yards, 2:06.**
- NO – Wil Lutz 35-yard field goal, 10:28. Saints 17–7. **Drive: 6 plays, 59 yards, 2:11.**
- CIN – Joe Burrow 19-yard run (Evan McPherson kick), 5:44. Saints 17–14. **Drive: 10 plays, 75 yards, 4:44.**
- NO – Wil Lutz 30-yard field goal, 0:01. Saints 20–14. **Drive: 14 plays, 63 yards, 5:43.**

**Third quarter**

- NO – Wil Lutz 37-yard field goal, 7:12. Saints 23–14. **Drive: 14 plays, 56 yards, 7:48.**
- CIN – Ja'Marr Chase 15-yard pass from Joe Burrow (Evan McPherson kick), 3:30. Saints 23–21. **Drive: 7 plays, 74 yards, 3:42.**

**Fourth quarter**

- NO – Wil Lutz 31-yard field goal, 11:07. Saints 26–21. **Drive: 14 plays, 66 yards, 7:23.**
- CIN – Evan McPherson 52-yard field goal, 3:42. Saints 26–24. **Drive: 13 plays, 41 yards, 7:25.**
- CIN – Ja'Marr Chase 60-yard pass from Joe Burrow (pass failed), 1:57. Bengals 30–26. **Drive: 1 play, 60 yards, 0:13.**

**Top passers**

- CIN – Joe Burrow – 28/37, 300 yards, 3 TD
- NO – Andy Dalton – 17/32, 162 yards, TD

**Top rushers**

- CIN – Joe Mixon – 8 rushes, 45 yards
- NO – Alvin Kamara – 19 rushes, 99 yards

**Top receivers**

- CIN – Ja'Marr Chase – 7 receptions, 132 yards, 2 TD
- NO – Tre'Quan Smith – 3 receptions, 43 yards, TD

Andy Dalton would start his third straight game, this time facing off against his former team. Though the Saints found themselves holding a two-score lead twice during the game, the Bengals pulled out a late fourth quarter comeback victory on a 60-yard touchdown pass from Joe Burrow to Ja'Marr Chase. On a botched 4th down conversion play, Eli Apple made a hit on Marquez Callaway which was controversially not flagged. The Saints were defeated 26–30, and fell to 2–4 on the year.

==== Week 7: at Arizona Cardinals ====
Week 7: New Orleans Saints at Arizona Cardinals – Game summary

Quarter	1	2	3	4	Total
Saints	7	7	3	17	**34**
**Cardinals**	3	25	7	7	**42**

at State Farm Stadium, Glendale, Arizona

- Date: October 20
- Game time: 7:15 p.m. CDT/5:15 p.m. MST
- Game weather: Sunny, 89 °F (32 °C) (retractable roof open)
- Game attendance: 63,290
- Referee: Jerome Boger
- TV announcers (WDSU/Prime Video): Al Michaels, Kirk Herbstreit and Kaylee Hartung
- Recap, Game Book

Game information

**First quarter**

- NO – Rashid Shaheed 53-yard pass from Andy Dalton (Wil Lutz kick), 12:53. Saints 7–0. **Drive: 4 plays, 75 yards, 2:07.**
- ARI – Rodrigo Blankenship 50-yard field goal, 10:54. Saints 7–3. **Drive: 6 plays, 43 yards, 1:59.**

**Second quarter**

- ARI – Rodrigo Blankenship 28-yard field goal, 13:15. Saints 7–6. **Drive: 9 plays, 70 yards, 3:51.**
- NO – Taysom Hill 3-yard pass from Andy Dalton (Wil Lutz kick), 10:29. Saints 14–6. **Drive: 5 plays, 75 yards, 2:46.**
- ARI – Keaontay Ingram 2-yard run (Eno Benjamin run), 2:28. Tied 14–14. **Drive: 13 plays, 75 yards, 8:01.**
- ARI – Marco Wilson 38-yard interception return (kick failed, wide left), 1:50. Cardinals 20–14.
- ARI – Isaiah Simmons 56-yard interception return (Kyler Murray–Zach Ertz pass), 0:46. Cardinals 28–14.

**Third quarter**

- NO – Wil Lutz 25-yard field goal, 9:44. Cardinals 28–17. **Drive: 9 plays, 54 yards, 4:16.**
- ARI – Greg Dortch 5-yard pass from Kyler Murray (Rodrigo Blankenship kick), 0:29. Cardinals 35–17. **Drive: 12 plays, 85 yards, 6:31.**

**Fourth quarter**

- NO – Juwan Johnson 17-yard pass from Andy Dalton (Wil Lutz kick), 11:14. Cardinals 35–24. **Drive: 5 plays, 46 yards, 1:40.**
- ARI – Eno Benjamin 5-yard run (Rodrigo Blankenship kick), 6:22. Cardinals 42–24. **Drive: 8 plays, 64 yards, 4:52.**
- NO – Juwan Johnson 1-yard pass from Andy Dalton (Wil Lutz kick), 3:07. Cardinals 42–31. **Drive: 11 plays, 75 yards, 3:15.**
- NO – Wil Lutz 45-yard field goal, 0:43. Cardinals 42–34. **Drive: 10 plays, 53 yards, 1:57.**

**Top passers**

- NO – Andy Dalton – 30/47, 361 yards, 4 TD, 3 INT
- ARI – Kyler Murray – 20/29, 204 yards, TD

**Top rushers**

- NO – Alvin Kamara – 11 rushes, 49 yards
- ARI – Eno Benjamin – 12 rushes, 92 yards, TD

**Top receivers**

- NO – Chris Olave – 7 receptions, 106 yards
- ARI – DeAndre Hopkins – 10 receptions, 103 yards

Andy Dalton started for the fourth straight game for the Saints on Thursday Night Football against the Cardinals. Although he would pass for four touchdowns, he threw three costly interceptions, two of which were returned for touchdowns in a span of about a minute near the end of the first half. The Cardinals found themselves up 28–14 because of these key defensive plays despite trailing New Orleans 14–6 at the start of the second quarter. The Cardinals would continue their dominance throughout the third quarter, holding the Saints to a field goal while scoring a touchdown of their own to go up 35–17, their largest lead of the night. In the fourth quarter, despite a late Saints rally in which they outscored Arizona 17–7 to cut the lead to just 8, the Cardinals held on for a thrilling 42–34 victory. The loss marked the first time since the 2015 season that the Saints were beaten by the Cardinals.

With the defeat, New Orleans fell to 2–5.

==== Week 8: vs. Las Vegas Raiders ====
Week 8: Las Vegas Raiders at New Orleans Saints – Game summary

Quarter	1	2	3	4	Total
Raiders	0	0	0	0	**0**
**Saints**	7	10	7	0	**24**

at Caesars Superdome, New Orleans, Louisiana

- Date: October 30
- Game time: 12:00 p.m. CDT
- Game weather: None (indoor stadium)
- Game attendance: 70,009
- Referee: Scott Novak
- TV announcers (CBS): Kevin Harlan, Trent Green and Melanie Collins
- Recap, Game Book

Game information

**First quarter**

- NO – Alvin Kamara 3-yard run (Wil Lutz kick), 1:32. Saints 7–0. **Drive: 11 plays, 84 yards, 6:43.**

**Second quarter**

- NO – Wil Lutz 37-yard field goal, 12:43. Saints 10–0. **Drive: 4 plays, 9 yards, 1:35.**
- NO – Alvin Kamara 16-yard pass from Andy Dalton (Wil Lutz kick), 7:15. Saints 17–0. **Drive: 6 plays, 45 yards, 3:54.**

**Third quarter**

- NO – Alvin Kamara 36-yard pass from Andy Dalton (Wil Lutz kick), 11:03. Saints 24–0. **Drive: 7 plays, 75 yards, 3:57.**

**Fourth quarter**

- No scoring plays.

**Top passers**

- LV – Derek Carr – 15/26, 101 yards, INT
- NO – Andy Dalton – 22/30, 229 yards, 2 TD

**Top rushers**

- LV – Josh Jacobs – 10 rushes, 43 yards
- NO – Alvin Kamara – 18 rushes, 62 yards, TD

**Top receivers**

- LV – Mack Hollins – 7 receptions, 64 yards
- NO – Alvin Kamara – 9 receptions, 96 yards, 2 TD

Andy Dalton started his fifth straight game of the season with Jameis Winston still out with an injury. Against the Raiders, the Saints thoroughly dominated them in front of a raucous capacity crowd of Saints fans in the Superdome, shutting them out 24–0. Dalton recorded a pair of passing touchdowns, both of which went to Alvin Kamara, who also logged a rushing touchdown to cap off a brilliant day for the star running back. The Saints defense smothered a Raiders offense that had put up a season-high 38 points the previous week, only allowing them to cross midfield once late in the game.

With the dominant win, the Saints improved to 3–5. They also defeated the Raiders for the first time since the 2012 season.

==== Week 9: vs. Baltimore Ravens ====
Week 9: Baltimore Ravens at New Orleans Saints – Game summary

Quarter	1	2	3	4	Total
**Ravens**	7	7	3	10	**27**
Saints	0	3	3	7	**13**

at Caesars Superdome, New Orleans, Louisiana

- Date: November 7
- Game time: 7:15 p.m. CST
- Game weather: None (indoor stadium)
- Game attendance: 70,010
- Referee: Brad Rogers
- TV announcers (WVUE/ESPN): Joe Buck, Troy Aikman and Lisa Salters
- Recap, Game Book

Game information

**First quarter**

- BAL – Isaiah Likely 24-yard pass from Lamar Jackson (Justin Tucker kick), 1:23. Ravens 7–0. **Drive: 11 plays, 76 yards, 7:02.**

**Second quarter**

- BAL – Kenyan Drake 1-yard run (Justin Tucker kick), 2:00. Ravens 14–0. **Drive: 12 plays, 81 yards, 7:05.**
- NO – Wil Lutz 33-yard field goal, 0:00. Ravens 14–3. **Drive: 12 plays, 60 yards, 2:00.**

**Third quarter**

- BAL – Justin Tucker 32-yard field goal, 8:25. Ravens 17–3. **Drive: 12 plays, 61 yards, 6:35.**
- NO – Wil Lutz 37-yard field goal, 1:25. Ravens 17–6. **Drive: 12 plays, 56 yards, 7:00.**

**Fourth quarter**

- BAL – Justin Tucker 41-yard field goal, 8:31. Ravens 20–6. **Drive: 8 plays, 40 yards, 4:39.**
- BAL – Kenyan Drake 3-yard run (Justin Tucker kick), 6:55. Ravens 27–6. **Drive: 3 plays, 17 yards, 1:29.**
- NO – Juwan Johnson 41-yard pass from Andy Dalton (Wil Lutz kick), 1:23. Ravens 27–13. **Drive: 9 plays, 83 yards, 2:42.**

**Top passers**

- BAL – Lamar Jackson – 12/22, 133 yards, TD
- NO – Andy Dalton – 19/29, 210 yards, TD, INT

**Top rushers**

- BAL – Kenyan Drake – 24 rushes, 93 yards, 2 TD
- NO – Alvin Kamara – 9 rushes, 30 yards

**Top receivers**

- BAL – Isaiah Likely – 1 reception, 24 yards, TD
- NO – Chris Olave – 6 receptions, 71 yards

Following their win against the Raiders, the Saints stayed home to face off against the Baltimore Ravens in a Week 9 contest on Monday Night Football. For the sixth straight game, Andy Dalton was named the starting quarterback for the team. The Saints found themselves in a big 14–0 deficit early on in the first half, courtesy of a Lamar Jackson passing touchdown and a Kenyan Drake rushing touchdown. The Saints would get their first points off the night off a Wil Lutz field goal to cut the deficit to 11 as time expired in the first half. In the third quarter, Justin Tucker would kick his first field goal of the night to make the score 17–3, but the Saints answered right back with a second Lutz field goal to make the score 17–6. In the fourth quarter however, the Ravens would put the game away as Tucker nailed his second field goal of the game, followed by another Kenyan Drake touchdown to make it a 21-point deficit for the Saints. A late touchdown pass from Dalton to Juwan Johnson made the final score 27–13, Ravens.

With the defeat, the Saints fell to 3–6.

==== Week 10: at Pittsburgh Steelers ====
Week 10: New Orleans Saints at Pittsburgh Steelers – Game summary

Quarter	1	2	3	4	Total
Saints	0	10	0	0	**10**
**Steelers**	7	3	0	10	**20**

at Acrisure Stadium, Pittsburgh, Pennsylvania

- Date: November 13
- Game time: 1:00 p.m. EST/12:00 p.m. CST
- Game weather: Cloudy, 41 °F (5 °C)
- Game attendance: 66,544
- Referee: Carl Cheffers
- TV announcers (Fox): Adam Amin, Mark Schlereth and Kristina Pink
- Recap, Game Book

Game information

**First quarter**

- PIT – George Pickens 1-yard rush (Matthew Wright kick), 5:06. Steelers 7–0. **Drive: 12 plays, 57 yards, 5:53.**

**Second quarter**

- PIT – Matthew Wright 33-yard field goal, 14:17. Steelers 10–0. **Drive: 8 plays, 65 yards, 2:54.**
- NO – Wil Lutz 44-yard field goal, 6:40. Steelers 10–3. **Drive: 9 plays, 40 yards, 4:04.**
- NO – Juwan Johnson 15-yard pass from Andy Dalton (Wil Lutz kick), 0:19. Tied 10–10. **Drive: 6 plays, 71 yards, 1:34.**

**Third quarter**

- No scoring plays.

**Fourth quarter**

- PIT – Matthew Wright 33-yard field goal, 13:43. Steelers 13–10. **Drive: 11 plays, 83 yards, 6:22.**
- PIT – Kenny Pickett 1-yard rush (Matthew Wright kick), Steelers 20–10. **Drive: 8 plays, 44 yards, 3:38.**

**Top passers**

- NO – Andy Dalton – 17/27, 174 yards, TD, 2 INT
- PIT – Kenny Pickett – 18/30, 199 yards

**Top rushers**

- NO – Alvin Kamara – 8 rushes, 26 yards
- PIT – Najee Harris – 20 rushes, 99 yards

**Top receivers**

- NO – Juwan Johnson – 5 receptions, 44 yards, TD
- PIT – Diontae Johnson – 4 receptions, 63 yards

After a tough loss to the Baltimore Ravens, they travel to Acrisure Stadium to take on the Pittsburgh Steelers. With the loss, the Saints drop to 3–7 on the year and it was the first time since 2006 that they were defeated by the Steelers.

==== Week 11: vs. Los Angeles Rams ====
Week 11: Los Angeles Rams at New Orleans Saints – Game summary

Quarter	1	2	3	4	Total
Rams	7	7	0	6	**20**
**Saints**	3	7	14	3	**27**

at Caesars Superdome, New Orleans, Louisiana

- Date: November 20
- Game time: 12:00 p.m. CST
- Game weather: None (indoor stadium)
- Game attendance: 70,025
- Referee: Ronald Torbert
- TV announcers (Fox): Kenny Albert, Jonathan Vilma and Shannon Spake
- Recap, Game Book

Game information

**First quarter**

- NO – Wil Lutz 46-yard field goal, 4:14. Saints 3–0. **Drive: 9 plays, 31 yards, 4:36.**
- LAR – Tutu Atwell 62-yard pass from Matthew Stafford (Matt Gay kick), 4:00. Rams 7–3. **Drive: 1 plays, 62 yards, 0:14.**

**Second quarter**

- NO – Juwan Johnson 8-yard pass from Andy Dalton (Wil Lutz kick), 12:11. Saints 10–7. **Drive: 7 plays, 49 yards, 3:00.**
- LAR – Allen Robinson 6-yard pass from Matthew Stafford (Matt Gay kick), 0:19. Rams 14–10. **Drive: 11 plays, 87 yards, 2:54.**

**Third quarter**

- NO – Jarvis Landry 7-yard pass from Andy Dalton (Wil Lutz kick), 10:23. Saints 17–14. **Drive: 9 plays, 75 yards, 4:37.**
- NO – Chris Olave 53-yard pass from Andy Dalton (Wil Lutz kick), 5:47. Saints 24–14. **Drive: 5 plays, 68 yards, 2:53.**

**Fourth quarter**

- LAR – Matt Gay 33-yard field goal, 14:48. Saints 24–17. **Drive: 12 plays, 60 yards, 5:59.**
- NO – Wil Lutz 25-yard field goal, 9:06. Saints 27–17. **Drive: 9 plays, 69 yards, 5:42.**
- LAR – Matt Gay 58-yard field goal, 0:06. Saints 27–20. **Drive: 6 plays, 34 yards, 1:17.**

**Top passers**

- LAR – Matthew Stafford – 11/18, 159 yards, 2 TD
- NO – Andy Dalton – 21/25, 260 yards, 3 TD

**Top rushers**

- LAR – Cam Akers – 14 rushes, 61 yards
- NO – Taysom Hill – 9 rushes, 52 yards

**Top receivers**

- LAR – Tutu Atwell – 1 reception, 62 yards, TD
- NO – Chris Olave – 5 receptions, 102 yards, TD

They return to the Superdome to take on the Los Angeles Rams. It has been four years since New Orleans played them at home, including the aforementioned NFC Championship. With the win over the Rams, the Saints improve to 4–7 on the year. It was the first time since the 2018 season in which New Orleans defeated the Los Angeles Rams.

==== Week 12: at San Francisco 49ers ====
Week 12: New Orleans Saints at San Francisco 49ers – Game summary

Quarter	1	2	3	4	Total
Saints	0	0	0	0	**0**
**49ers**	3	7	3	0	**13**

at Levi's Stadium, Santa Clara, California

- Date: November 27
- Game time: 3:25 p.m. CST/1:25 p.m. PST
- Game weather: Partly cloudy, 67 °F (19 °C)
- Game attendance: 71,275
- Referee: Shawn Hochuli
- TV announcers (Fox): Kevin Kugler, Mark Sanchez and Laura Okmin
- Recap, Game Book

Game information

**First quarter**

- SF – Robbie Gould 24-yard field goal, 8:01. 49ers 3–0. **Drive: 11 plays, 38 yards, 4:54.**

**Second quarter**

- SF – Jauan Jennings 5-yard pass from Jimmy Garoppolo (Robbie Gould kick), 0:13. 49ers 10–0. **Drive: 9 plays, 57 yards, 1:34.**

**Third quarter**

- SF – Robbie Gould 46-yard field goal, 10:25. 49ers 13–0. **Drive: 9 plays, 47 yards, 4:35.**

**Fourth quarter**

- No scoring plays.

**Top passers**

- NO – Andy Dalton – 18/29, 209 yards
- SF – Jimmy Garoppolo – 26/37, 222 yards, TD

**Top rushers**

- NO – Andy Dalton – 4 rushes, 21 yards
- SF – Elijah Mitchell – 7 rushes, 35 yards

**Top receivers**

- NO – Chris Olave – 5 receptions, 62 yards
- SF – Brandon Aiyuk – 5 receptions, 65 yards

They meet with the San Francisco 49ers on the road. After Kamara fumbled twice, the Saints struggled to hold off Jimmy Garoppolo and his offense. They didn't even score points, thus snapping their streak without being shut out. The Saints were shut out for the first time since week 17 of the 2001 season, which was also against San Francisco. This loss brought the Saints record down to 4–8.

==== Week 13: at Tampa Bay Buccaneers ====
Week 13: New Orleans Saints at Tampa Bay Buccaneers – Game summary

Quarter	1	2	3	4	Total
Saints	0	10	3	3	**16**
**Buccaneers**	3	0	0	14	**17**

at Raymond James Stadium, Tampa, Florida

- Date: December 5
- Game time: 8:15 p.m. EST/7:15 p.m. CST
- Game weather: Cloudy, 72 °F (22 °C)
- Game attendance: 68,709
- Referee: Clay Martin
- TV announcers (WVUE/ESPN): Joe Buck, Troy Aikman and Lisa Salters
- Recap, Game Book

Game information

**First quarter**

- TB – Ryan Succop 21-yard field goal, 6:25. Buccaneers 3–0. **Drive: 16 plays, 72 yards, 8:35.**

**Second quarter**

- NO – Taysom Hill 30-yard pass from Andy Dalton (Wil Lutz kick), 7:33. Saints 7–3. **Drive: 8 plays, 80 yards, 4:44.**
- NO – Wil Lutz 38-yard field goal, 0:20. Saints 10–3. **Drive: 6 plays, 30 yards, 1:07.**

**Third quarter**

- NO – Wil Lutz 21-yard field goal, 2:46. Saints 13–3. **Drive: 12 plays, 65 yards, 7:20.**

**Fourth quarter**

- NO – Wil Lutz 29-yard field goal, 8:02. Saints 16–3. **Drive: 12 plays, 69 yards, 6:51.**
- TB – Cade Otton 1-yard pass from Tom Brady (Ryan Succop kick), 3:00. Saints 16–10. **Drive: 10 plays, 91 yards, 2:21.**
- TB – Rachaad White 6-yard pass from Tom Brady (Ryan Succop kick), 0:03. Buccaneers 17–16. **Drive: 11 plays, 63 yards, 2:26.**

**Top passers**

- NO – Andy Dalton – 20/28, 229 yards, TD
- TB – Tom Brady – 36/54, 281 yards, 2 TD, INT

**Top rushers**

- NO – Mark Ingram – 7 rushes, 27 yards
- TB – Leonard Fournette – 10 rushes, 49 yards

**Top receivers**

- NO – Rashid Shaheed – 4 receptions, 75 yards
- TB – Chris Godwin – 8 receptions, 63 yards

The Saints traveled to Tampa for their second matchup against their division rival, the Buccaneers. They were unable to hold on as they were swept by the Buccaneers for the first time since the 2007 season. With the loss, the Saints fell to 4–9, securing the franchise its first losing season since 2016.

==== Week 15: vs. Atlanta Falcons ====
Week 15: Atlanta Falcons at New Orleans Saints – Game summary

Quarter	1	2	3	4	Total
Falcons	0	3	7	8	**18**
**Saints**	14	0	7	0	**21**

at Caesars Superdome, New Orleans, Louisiana

- Date: December 18
- Game time: 12:00 p.m. CST
- Game weather: None (indoor stadium)
- Game attendance: 70,041
- Referee: Clete Blakeman
- TV announcers (Fox): Adam Amin, Mark Schlereth and Kristina Pink
- Recap, Game Book

Game information

**First quarter**

- NO – Juwan Johnson 19-yard pass from Andy Dalton (Wil Lutz kick), 10:06. Saints 7–0. **Drive: 10 plays, 75 yards, 4:54.**
- NO – Rashid Shaheed 68-yard pass from Taysom Hill (Wil Lutz kick), 8:17. Saints 14–0. **Drive: 2 plays, 73 yards, 0:50.**

**Second quarter**

- ATL – Younghoe Koo 28-yard field goal, 11:15. Saints 14–3. **Drive: 12 plays, 52 yards, 5:51.**

**Third quarter**

- ATL – Tyler Allgeier 5-yard run (Younghoe Koo kick), 14:46. Saints 14–10. **Drive: 8 plays, 75 yards, 4:14.**
- NO – Juwan Johnson 22-yard pass from Andy Dalton (Wil Lutz kick), 3:34. Saints 21–10. **Drive: 11 plays, 75 yards, 7:12.**

**Fourth quarter**

- ATL – Cordarrelle Patterson 3-yard run (Tyler Allgeier run), 7:07. Saints 21–18. **Drive: 8 plays, 32 yards, 4:00.**

**Top passers**

- ATL – Desmond Ridder – 13/26, 97 yards
- NO – Andy Dalton – 11/17, 151 yards, 2 TD

**Top rushers**

- ATL – Tyler Allgeier – 17 rushes, 139 yards, TD
- NO – Alvin Kamara – 21 rushes, 91 yards

**Top receivers**

- ATL – Drake London – 7 receptions, 70 yards
- NO – Rashid Shaheed – 3 receptions, 95 yards, TD

The Saints host the Falcons in the Superdome. In Week 1, they defeated them with a 51-yard field goal and a kick block. With the victory, not only did the Saints sweep Atlanta, but they also improve to their 5–9 record.

==== Week 16: at Cleveland Browns ====
Week 16: New Orleans Saints at Cleveland Browns – Game summary

Quarter	1	2	3	4	Total
**Saints**	0	3	14	0	**17**
Browns	0	10	0	0	**10**

at FirstEnergy Stadium, Cleveland, Ohio

- Date: December 24
- Game time: 1:00 p.m. EST/12:00 p.m. CST
- Game weather: Frigid, 6 °F (−14 °C)
- Game attendance: 67,431
- Referee: Brad Rogers
- TV announcers (CBS): Spero Dedes, Jay Feely and Aditi Kinkhabawala
- Recap, Game Book

Game information

**First quarter**

- No scoring plays.

**Second quarter**

- CLE – Deshaun Watson 12-yard run (Cade York kick), 14:55. Browns 7–0. **Drive: 5 plays, 30 yards, 2:49.**
- CLE – Cade York 30-yard field goal, 4:07. Browns 10–0. **Drive: 17 plays, 60 yards, 8:44.**
- NO – Wil Lutz 23-yard field goal, 0:00. Browns 10–3. **Drive: 10 plays, 68 yards, 4:07.**

**Third quarter**

- NO – Taysom Hill 8-yard run (Wil Lutz kick), 9:40. Tied 10–10. **Drive: 9 plays, 67 yards, 5:20.**
- NO – Alvin Kamara 4-yard run (Wil Lutz kick), 0:55. Saints 17–10. **Drive: 4 plays, 15 yards, 2:00.**

**Fourth quarter**

- No scoring plays.

**Top passers**

- NO – Andy Dalton – 8/15, 92 yards, INT
- CLE – Deshaun Watson – 15/31, 135 yards, INT

**Top rushers**

- NO – Alvin Kamara – 20 rushes, 76 yards, TD
- CLE – Nick Chubb – 24 rushes, 92 yards

**Top receivers**

- NO – Rashid Shaheed – 4 receptions, 41 yards
- CLE – Amari Cooper – 6 receptions, 72 yards

The Saints travel to FirstEnergy Stadium to take on the Cleveland Browns in a cold weather game. They trailed in the first half but came back in the second half. With the 17–10 victory, they improve to 6–9.

==== Week 17: at Philadelphia Eagles ====
Week 17: New Orleans Saints at Philadelphia Eagles – Game summary

Quarter	1	2	3	4	Total
**Saints**	7	6	0	7	**20**
Eagles	0	0	10	0	**10**

at Lincoln Financial Field, Philadelphia, Pennsylvania

- Date: January 1
- Game time: 1:00 p.m. EST/12:00 p.m. CST
- Game weather: Sunny, 55 °F (13 °C)
- Game attendance: 69,796
- Referee: Jerome Boger
- TV announcers (Fox): Joe Davis, Daryl Johnston and Pam Oliver
- Recap, Game Book

Game information

**First quarter**

- NO – Taysom Hill 1-yard run (Wil Lutz kick), 6:02. Saints 7–0. **Drive: 15 plays, 75 yards, 8:58.**

**Second quarter**

- NO – Wil Lutz 54-yard field goal, 8:30. Saints 10–0. **Drive: 5 plays, 22 yards, 2:58.**
- NO – Wil Lutz 20-yard field goal, 3:05. Saints 13–0. **Drive: 7 plays, 68 yards, 3:55.**

**Third quarter**

- PHI – Jake Elliott 56-yard field goal, 10:58. Saints 13–3. **Drive: 9 plays, 53 yards, 4:02.**
- PHI – A. J. Brown 78-yard pass from Gardner Minshew (Jake Elliott kick), 0:45. Saints 13–10. **Drive: 3 plays, 96 yards, 1:29.**

**Fourth quarter**

- NO – Marshon Lattimore 12-yard interception return (Wil Lutz kick), 5:27. Saints 20–10.

**Top passers**

- NO – Andy Dalton – 18/22, 204 yards, INT
- PHI – Gardner Minshew – 18/32, 274 yards, TD, INT

**Top rushers**

- NO – Alvin Kamara – 16 rushes, 74 yards
- PHI – Miles Sanders – 12 rushes, 61 yards

**Top receivers**

- NO – Rashid Shaheed – 6 receptions, 79 yards
- PHI – DeVonta Smith – 9 receptions, 115 yards

The Saints meet the Eagles for the third straight season. After losing to them in both the 2020 and 2021 seasons, they improved their performance with Andy Dalton and Taysom Hill. In the first half, the Saints scored a touchdown and three field goals to give them the lead. The Eagles looked like they were making a comeback scoring ten points in the third with the help of their defense, and although they gave up only one touchdown, Minshew threw a pick six to Marshon Lattimore, effectively ending the game. For the first time since the 2018 season, the Saints beat the Eagles. It was an easy win for the Saints as Jalen Hurts was sidelined due to his shoulder injury. They improve to 7–9, but only to be eliminated from postseason contention due to wins by the Buccaneers (who clinched the NFC South), Lions, and Packers.

==== Week 18: vs. Carolina Panthers ====
Week 18: Carolina Panthers at New Orleans Saints – Game summary

Quarter	1	2	3	4	Total
**Panthers**	0	0	7	3	**10**
Saints	7	0	0	0	**7**

at Caesars Superdome, New Orleans, Louisiana

- Date: January 8
- Game time: 12:00 p.m. CST
- Game weather: None (indoor stadium)
- Game attendance: 70,118
- Referee: Alex Kemp
- TV announcers (Fox): Jason Benetti, Matt Millen and Megan Olivi
- Recap, Game Book

Game information

**First quarter**

- NO – Chris Olave 25-yard pass from Andy Dalton (Wil Lutz kick), 11:01. Saints 7–0. **Drive: 8 plays, 75 yards, 3:59.**

**Second quarter**

- No scoring plays

**Third quarter**

- CAR – Michael Jordan 0-yard fumble return (Eddy Piñeiro kick), 6:45. Tied 7–7.

**Fourth quarter**

- CAR – Eddy Piñeiro 42-yard field goal, 0:00. Panthers 10–7. **Drive: 6 plays, 31 yards, 1:20.**

**Top passers**

- CAR – Sam Darnold – 5/15, 43 yards, 2 INT
- NO – Andy Dalton – 15/25, 171 yards, TD

**Top rushers**

- CAR – Chuba Hubbard – 21 rushes, 69 yards
- NO – Alvin Kamara – 23 rushes, 107 yards

**Top receivers**

- CAR – Terrace Marshall Jr. – 2 receptions, 23 yards
- NO – Chris Olave – 5 receptions, 60 yards, TD

After a win over the Philadelphia Eagles, the Saints return home for their last regular season game against the Panthers. In Saints' territory, Marcus Davenport and D'Onta Foreman both got into a fight, resulting in ejections. After Eddy Piñeiro nailed a 42-yard field goal, the Saints get swept by the Panthers for the first time since the 2015 season, finishing their season with a 7-10 record, earning them the worst season since 2005.

=== Standings ===
==== Division ====
NFC South
	W	L	T	PCT	DIV	CONF	PF	PA	STK
^{(4)} Tampa Bay Buccaneers	8	9	0	.471	4–2	8–4	313	358	L1
Carolina Panthers	7	10	0	.412	4–2	6–6	347	374	W1
New Orleans Saints	7	10	0	.412	2–4	5–7	330	345	L1
Atlanta Falcons	7	10	0	.412	2–4	6–6	365	386	W2

==== Conference ====
NFC
#	Team	Division	W	L	T	PCT	DIV	CONF	SOS	SOV	STK
**Division leaders**
1	Philadelphia Eagles	East	14	3	0	.824	4–2	9–3	.474	.460	W1
2 (Note: San Francisco claimed the No. 2 seed over Minnesota based on conference record (10–2 vs. 8–4).)	San Francisco 49ers	West	13	4	0	.765	6–0	10–2	.417	.414	W10
3	Minnesota Vikings	North	13	4	0	.765	4–2	8–4	.474	.425	W1
4	Tampa Bay Buccaneers	South	8	9	0	.471	4–2	8–4	.503	.426	L1
**Wild cards**
5	Dallas Cowboys	East	12	5	0	.706	4–2	8–4	.507	.485	L1
6	New York Giants	East	9	7	1	.559	1–4–1	4–7–1	.526	.395	L1
7 (Note: Seattle finished ahead of Detroit based on head-to-head victory, claiming the 7th and final playoff spot.)	Seattle Seahawks	West	9	8	0	.529	4–2	6–6	.462	.382	W2
**Did not qualify for the postseason**
8	Detroit Lions	North	9	8	0	.529	5–1	7–5	.535	.451	W2
9	Washington Commanders	East	8	8	1	.500	2–3–1	5–6–1	.536	.449	W1
10	Green Bay Packers	North	8	9	0	.471	3–3	6–6	.524	.449	L1
11 (Note: Carolina finished ahead of New Orleans and Atlanta based on head-to-head record (3–1 vs. 2–2/1–3).)	Carolina Panthers	South	7	10	0	.412	4–2	6–6	.474	.437	W1
12 (Note: New Orleans finished ahead of Atlanta based on head-to-head sweep.)	New Orleans Saints	South	7	10	0	.412	2–4	5–7	.507	.462	L1
13	Atlanta Falcons	South	7	10	0	.412	2–4	6–6	.467	.429	W2
14	Los Angeles Rams	West	5	12	0	.294	1–5	3–9	.517	.341	L2
15	Arizona Cardinals	West	4	13	0	.235	1–5	3–9	.529	.368	L7
16	Chicago Bears	North	3	14	0	.176	0–6	1–11	.571	.480	L10
**Tiebreakers** (Note: When breaking ties for three or more teams under the NFL's rules, they are first broken within divisions, then comparing only the highest-ranked remaining team from each division.)
