= Lewis Kidd =

Lewis Kidd may refer to:

- Lewis Kidd (footballer)
- Lewis Kidd (American football)
