= Paulson Adebo =

American football player (born 1999)

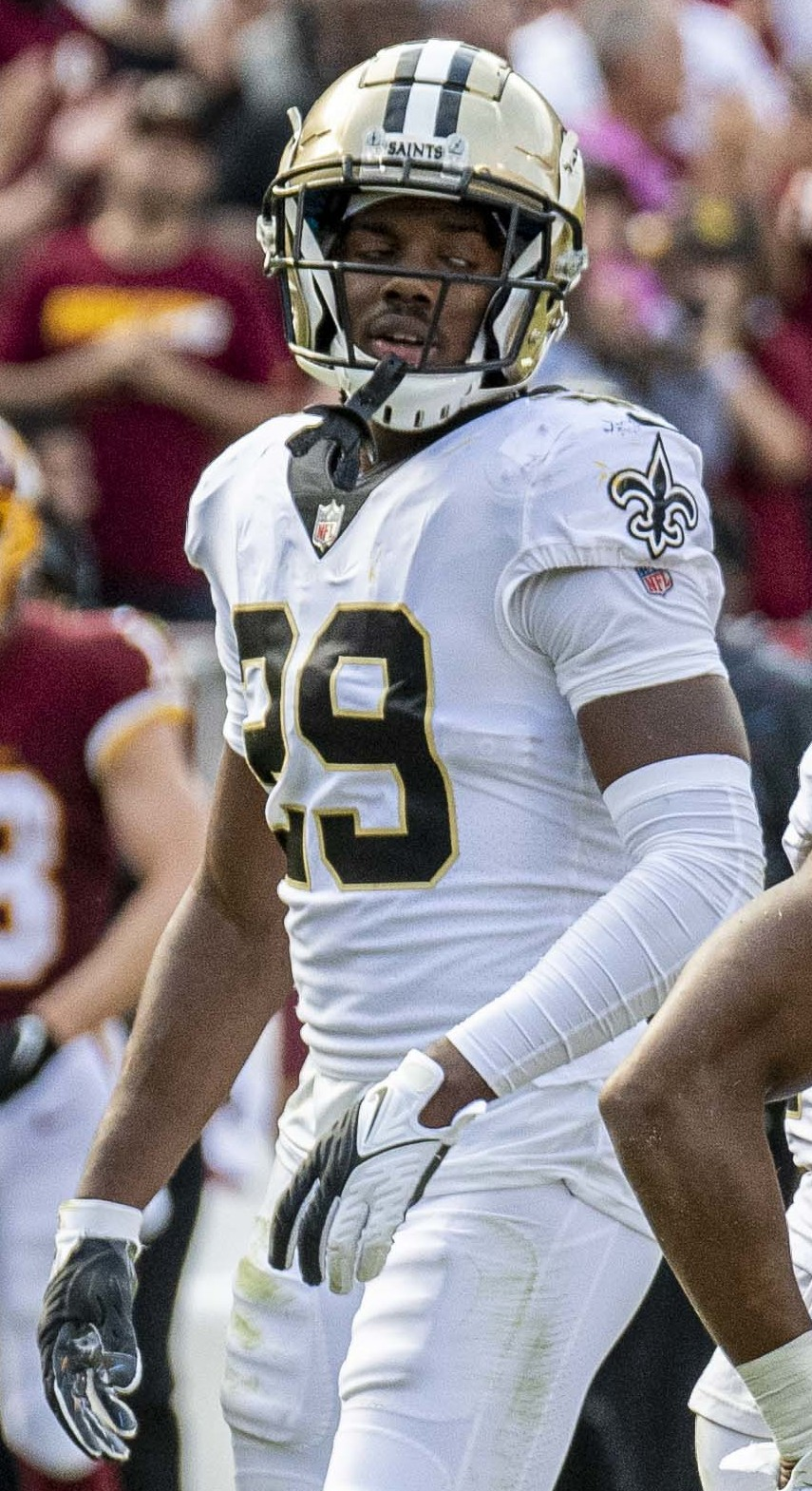
- Adebo with the New Orleans Saints in 2021

No. 21 – New York Giants
- Position: Cornerback
- Roster status: Active

Personal information
- Born: July 3, 1999 (age 27); Farmington, Michigan, U.S.
- Listed height: 6 ft 1 in (1.85 m)
- Listed weight: 192 lb (87 kg)

Career information
- High school: Mansfield (Mansfield, Texas)
- College: Stanford (2017–2020)
- NFL draft: 2021: 3rd round, 76th overall pick

Career history
- New Orleans Saints (2021–2024); New York Giants (2025–present)

Awards and highlights
- 2× First-team All-Pac-12 (2018, 2019)

Career NFL statistics as of 2025
- Total tackles: 327
- Forced fumbles: 2
- Fumble recoveries: 2
- Pass deflections: 51
- Interceptions: 11
- Stats at Pro Football Reference

Saiid Paulson Adebo (born July 3, 1999) is an American professional football cornerback for the New York Giants of the National Football League (NFL). He played college football for the Stanford Cardinal and was selected by the New Orleans Saints in the third round of the 2021 NFL draft.

== Early life ==
Adebo attended Mansfield High School in Mansfield, Texas. He played defensive back and wide receiver in high school. He originally committed to the University of Notre Dame to play college football but changed to Stanford University.

== College career ==
After not appearing in any games his first year at Stanford in 2017, Adebo played in 13 games with 12 starts in 2018. He finished the season with 64 tackles and four interceptions. He returned as a starter in 2019. During his junior season, Adebo had 33 tackles, 10 pass breakups, and 4 interceptions. Despite speculation that he would declare for the 2020 NFL draft, and being listed as the number 2 draft-eligible cornerback by Mel Kiper, Adebo announced that he would return to Stanford for his senior year.

== Professional career ==
=== Pre-draft ===
Dane Brugler of The Athletic had him ranked as the 12th best cornerback prospect in the draft. NFL media analyst Daniel Jeremiah listed him as the 12th best cornerback (91st overall) available in the draft. Michael Renner of Pro Football Focus had Adebo listed as the 17th best cornerback prospect (126th overall) on his big board. Cory Giddings of Bleacher Report had Adebo ranked as the 18th best cornerback prospect (149th overall) in the draft. Lorenz Leinweber of Sports Illustrated ranked Adebo as the 19th best cornerback in the draft and projected him to be selected on the sixth round. NFL draft analysts projected Adebo to be selected as early as the second round to as late as the sixth round.

External videos
- Stanford CB Paulson Adebo runs 4.42
- Paulson Adebo: Stanford Pro Day

Pre-draft measurables
Height	Weight	Arm length	Hand span	Wingspan	40-yard dash	10-yard split	20-yard split	20-yard shuttle	Three-cone drill	Vertical jump	Broad jump	Bench press
6 ft 1 in (1.85 m)	198 lb (90 kg)	31 1/2 in (0.80 m)	10 in (0.25 m)	6 ft 4 7/8 in (1.95 m)	4.44 s	1.57 s	2.60 s	4.13 s	6.69 s	36.5 in (0.93 m)	10 ft 1 in (3.07 m)	18 reps
All values from Pro Day

=== New Orleans Saints ===
==== 2021 ====
The New Orleans Saints selected Adebo in the third round (76th overall) of the 2021 NFL draft. The Saints acquired the 76th overall pick they used to draft Adebo after orchestrating a trade where they sent two 2021 third-round picks (98th and 105th overall) to the Denver Broncos and received the third-round (76th overall) pick in return. Adebo was the 11th cornerback drafted in 2021. On June 9, 2021, the Saints signed Adebo to a four–year, $5.04 million contract that includes an initial signing bonus of $1.02 million.

External videos
- Saints draft Paulson Adebo No. 76

Throughout training camp, he competed to be a starting cornerback following the retirement of Janoris Jenkins left a role vacant. He competed against Patrick Robinson until the sudden retirement of Robinson on August 10. The Saints signed Prince Amukamara and held a competition for the starting role at cornerback that also included Brian Poole, Grant Haley, P. J. Williams, and Ken Crawley. Head coach Sean Payton named Adebo the No. 2 starting cornerback to begin the season and paired him with Marshon Lattimore.

On September 12, 2021, Adebo started in his professional regular season debut and recorded three combined tackles (two solo), a pass deflection, and had his first career interception off a pass thrown by Aaron Rodgers intended for wide receiver Davante Adams as the Saints routed the Green Bay Packers 38–3. The following week, he collected a season-high seven combined tackles (six solo) during a 7–26 loss at the Carolina Panthers in Week 2. On January 9, 2022, Adebo recorded five combined tackles (three solo), a season-high two pass deflections, while intercepting a pass by quarterback Matt Ryan in a 20–30 victory over the Atlanta Falcon. He started in all 17 games as a rookie and finished the 2021 NFL season with a total of 66 combined tackles (55 solo), eight passes defensed, and three interceptions while appearing in 850 (76%) of the team's defensive snaps. He received an overall grade of 60.3 from Pro Football Focus as a rookie in 2021.

==== 2022 ====
Defensive coordinator Dennis Allen was promoted to head coach following the retirement of Sean Payton. Defensive coordinators Ryan Nielsen and Kris Richard retained Adebo and Marshon Lattimore as the starting cornerback duo to begin the season.

He was inactive for the first two games (Weeks 1–2) of the regular season after injuring his ankle. In Week 4, he collected a season-high eight solo tackles and made a pass deflection during a 25–28 loss against the Minnesota Vikings. He injured his knee and was subsequently sidelined during a 34–42 loss at the Arizona Cardinals in Week 7. In Week 12, Adebo made six combined tackles (four solo) and a season-high two pass deflections during a 0–13 loss at the San Francisco 49ers. He missed a 7–10 loss to the Carolina Panthers in Week 18 due to a hamstring injury. He finished the 2022 NFL season with a total of 60 combined tackles (51 solo) and seven passes defended in 13 games and 12 starts. He received an overall grade of 49.1 from Pro Football Focus in 2022.

==== 2023 ====
He entered training camp slated as a starting cornerback under new defensive coordinator Joe Woods. Head coach Dennis Allen named Adebo the No. 2 starting cornerback to begin the season and paired him with Marshon Lattimore.

On September 10, 2023, Adebo started in the New Orleans Saints' home-opener against the Tennessee Titans and recorded two solo tackles, broke up a pass, and intercepted a pass thrown by Ryan Tannehill to wide receiver DeAndre Hopkins during a 15–16 victory. He was inactive for two games (Weeks 3–4) after injuring his hamstring. In Week 8, he made three solo tackles, a season-high three pass deflections, and intercepted a pass by Gardner Minshew to Michael Pittman during a 38–27 victory at the Indianapolis Colts. On November 5, 2023, Adebo made seven combined tackles (five solo), tied his season-high of three pass deflections, forced a fumble, had a fumble recovery, and set a career-high with two interceptions on pass attempts thrown by Tyson Bagent during a 24–17 win over the Chicago Bears. His Week 9 performance earned him the National Football Conference Defensive Player of the Week. In Week 16, he collected a season-high ten combined tackles (nine solo) during a 22–30 loss at the Los Angeles Rams. He finished the season with 76 combined tackles (60 solo), 18 pass deflections, four interceptions, two forced fumbles, and two fumble recoveries in 15 games and 15 starts. He received an overall grade of 78.6 from Pro Football Focus in 2023.

==== 2024 ====
He returned as a starting cornerback and was paired with Marshon Lattimore for the fourth consecutive season. On September 15, 2024, Adebo made five combined tackles (four solo), two pass deflections, and returned an interception thrown by Dak Prescott to wide receiver Jalen Brooks for a season-long 47–yard return during a 44–19 win at the Dallas Cowboys. In Week 4, he collected a career-high 12 combined tackles (ten solo), set a season-high with three pass deflections, and intercepted a pass thrown by Kirk Cousins to wide receiver Ray-Ray McCloud during a 24–26 loss at the Atlanta Falcons. On October 17, 2024, Adebo recorded six combined tackles (three solo) before sustaining an injury during a collision with running back Javonte Williams and was immediately carted off the field in the second quarter of a 10–33 loss against the Denver Broncos on Thursday Night Football. Head coach Dennis Allen announced Adebo had broken his femur and will undergo surgery immediately and is ruled out for the rest of the season with an expected recovery time of four to five months. On October 22, 2024, the Saints officially placed him on injured reserve and he was ruled out for the remaining ten games (Weeks 8–18) of the 2024 NFL season. He finished with 52 combined tackles (43 solo), ten pass deflections, and three interceptions in seven games and seven starts. On November 4, 2024, the New Orleans Saints announced their decision to fire head coach Dennis Allen after they fell to a record of 2–7 and appointed special teams coordinator Darren Rizzi to interim head coach for the rest of the season. He received an overall grade of 63.3 from Pro Football Focus, which ranked 97th among 222 qualifying cornerbacks in 2024.

=== New York Giants ===
On March 13, 2025, the New York Giants signed Adebo to a three–year, $54.00 million contract that includes $38.50 million guaranteed, $34.75 million guaranteed upon signing, and an initial signing bonus of $15.00 million. Adebo was named a starting corner alongside Cor'Dale Flott and Deonte Banks On December 21, 2025, Adebo recorded his first interception for the Giants when he picked off a J.J. McCarthy pass in the first quarter of a 16-13 loss vs the Minnesota Vikings.

At the start of the 2026 season, Adebo lost the starting corner battle to Deonte Banks and Greg Newsome II. On September 18, 2026, Adebo was placed on injured reserve following a knee injury. He was activated on October 24.

== NFL career statistics ==
Legend
**Bold**	Career high

=== Regular season ===
Year	Team	Games		Tackles						Interceptions						Fumbles	
Year	Team	GP	GS	Comb	Solo	Ast	Sck	TFL	Sfty	PD	Int	Yds	Avg	Lng	TD	FF	FR
2021	NO	**17**	**17**	66	55	11	0.0	**4**	—	8	3	50	16.7	33	0	0	0
2022	NO	13	12	60	51	9	0.0	2	—	7	0	0	0.0	0	0	0	0
2023	NO	15	15	**76**	**60**	16	0.0	0	—	**18**	**4**	32	8.0	27	0	**2**	**2**
2024	NO	7	7	52	43	9	0.0	1	—	10	3	**68**	**22.7**	**47**	0	0	0
2025	NYG	12	12	73	56	**17**	0.0	1	—	8	1	0	0.0	0	0	0	0
Career		64	63	327	265	62	0.0	8	0	51	11	150	13.6	47	0	2	2
