= Bradley Roby =

American football player (born 1992)

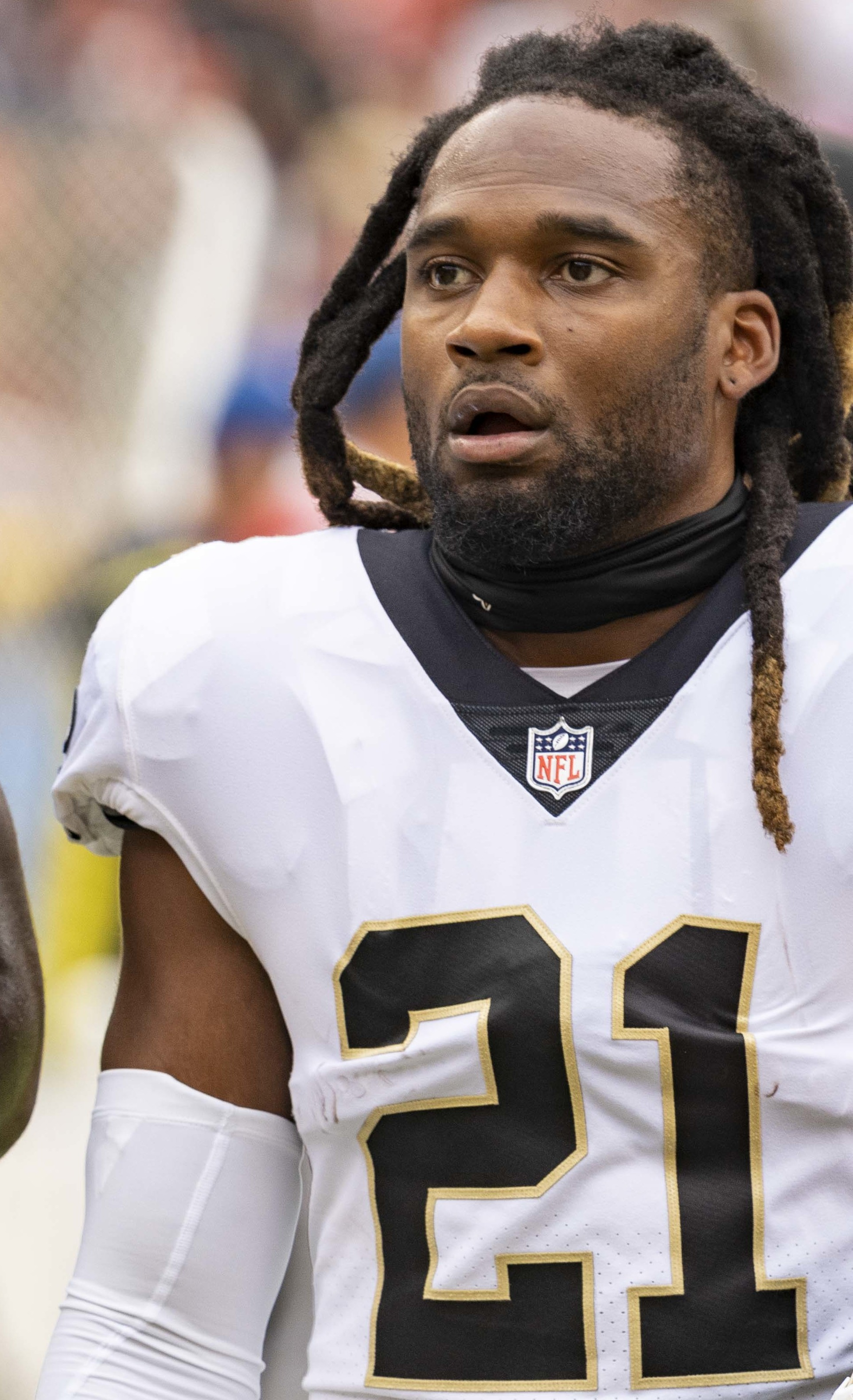
- Roby with the New Orleans Saints in 2021

No. 29, 21, 33
- Position: Cornerback

Personal information
- Born: May 1, 1992 (age 34); Fort Worth, Texas, U.S.
- Listed height: 5 ft 11 in (1.80 m)
- Listed weight: 194 lb (88 kg)

Career information
- High school: Peachtree Ridge (Suwanee, Georgia)
- College: Ohio State (2010–2013)
- NFL draft: 2014: 1st round, 31st overall pick

Career history
- Denver Broncos (2014–2018); Houston Texans (2019–2020); New Orleans Saints (2021–2022); Philadelphia Eagles (2023)

Awards and highlights
- Super Bowl champion (50); Second-team All-American (2012); 2× First-team All-Big Ten (2012, 2013)

Career NFL statistics
- Total tackles: 392
- Sacks: 5
- Forced fumbles: 9
- Fumble recoveries: 7
- Pass deflections: 85
- Interceptions: 11
- Defensive touchdowns: 4
- Stats at Pro Football Reference

Bradley Roby (born May 1, 1992) is an American former professional football player who was a cornerback in the National Football League (NFL). He was selected by the Denver Broncos in the first round of the 2014 NFL draft. He played college football for the Ohio State Buckeyes. He also played in the NFL for the Houston Texans, New Orleans Saints, and Philadelphia Eagles.

== Early life ==
Roby was born on May 1, 1992 in Fort Worth, Texas. A native of Suwanee, Georgia, Roby attended Peachtree Ridge High School, where he was an All-State receiver and defensive back for the Lions program. He recorded 42 tackles and six interceptions along with 29 receptions for 526 yards as a senior. He scored 11 touchdowns: five on receptions, two on punt returns and one each via a rush and kick, interception and a fumble return. He was a four-time school scholar-athlete. He was also a standout basketball player.

In addition to football, Roby was on the school's track & field team. He won the 100 meters at the 2009 Region 7 AAAAA Championships, with a career-best time of 10.72 seconds, and also finished third in the 200 meters with a career-best time of 22.49 seconds. He also competed in long jump.

Regarded as a three-star recruit by ESPN.com, Roby was listed as the No. 42 athlete in the nation in 2010. Roby initially planned to sign his national letter of intent to play wide receiver at Vanderbilt, but later decided to change his mind after receiving interest from Ohio State to play defensive back.

== College career ==
Roby attended Ohio State University from 2010 to 2013. After redshirting the 2010 season as a true freshman, Roby stepped up and started all 13 games at cornerback in 2011. He was tied for the team lead with three interceptions and also recorded 47 tackles. In 2012, Roby was the only defensive player in the nation in 2012 to score touchdowns three different ways (recovered a fumbled punt in the end zone vs. Miami; he recovered a blocked punt in the end zone vs. Indiana; and he intercepted a pass vs. Nebraska and returned it for a touchdown). He was named a second-team All-American by the Associated Press, and first-team All-Big Ten Conference while leading the nation in passes defended with 19. He added 63 tackles and two interceptions. In 2013, he was named first-team All-Big Ten after recording 69 tackles, 16 passes defended (T3rd in the Big Ten), three interceptions and two blocked punts.

On November 20, 2013, Ohio State head coach Urban Meyer announced that Roby would be leaving school early to enter the 2014 NFL draft.

== Professional career ==
=== Pre-draft ===
Following his sophomore season, Roby was projected to be a first or second-round pick if he declared for the 2013 NFL draft, but instead returned for his junior season. He was invited to play in the Senior Bowl and 2014 East–West Shrine Game, but was unable to participate due to a knee injury. He participated at the NFL Scouting Combine and performed almost all of the positional and combined drills only skipping the three-cone drill. He finished third among all defensive backs in the 40-yard dash and tied for fifth in the short shuttle. On March 7, 2014, Roby performed at Ohio State's pro day, but chose to only perform coverage drills and chose to only run the three-cone drill after skipping it at the combine. He had pre-draft visits and held private workouts with multiple teams, including the San Diego Chargers, Pittsburgh Steelers, Buffalo Bills, and Detroit Lions. During his pre-draft visits with the Cincinnati Bengals, Roby later claimed that they informed him they would select him at 24th overall with the expectation on Darqueze Dennard being unavailable at their position. This also took place prior to Roby's arrest.

At the conclusion of the pre-draft process, NFL draft experts projected that Roby would be selected in the first or early second round of the 2014 NFL draft. NFL analyst Mike Mayock ranked Roby as the fourth best cornerback prospect in the draft. DraftScout.com had him ranked fifth amongst all cornerbacks. Sports Illustrated had Roby ranked as the seventh best cornerback prospect in the draft. On April 20, 2014, 18 days before the 2014 NFL draft, Columbus Police responded to a 911 call and upon arriving to the scene in downtown Columbus, they found Roby apparently passed out behind the wheel of his Dodge Charger. He was arrested by Columbus Police and charged for an OVI (See Personal life). On April 29, 2014, Roby plead guilty in Franklin County Court to an amended charge of physical control of a motor vehicle while under the influence of drugs or alcohol.

Pre-draft measurables
Height	Weight	Arm length	Hand span	40-yard dash	10-yard split	20-yard split	20-yard shuttle	Three-cone drill	Vertical jump	Broad jump	Bench press
5 ft 11 1/4 in (1.81 m)	194 lb (88 kg)	31 1/2 in (0.80 m)	10 1/4 in (0.26 m)	4.39 s	1.52 s	2.56 s	4.04 s	6.74 s	38.5 in (0.98 m)	10 ft 4 in (3.15 m)	17 reps
All values from NFL Combine/Ohio State's Pro Day

=== Denver Broncos ===
==== 2014 ====
The Denver Broncos selected Roby in the first round (31st overall) of the 2014 NFL draft. He was the fifth cornerback selected in 2014. Although the Bengals allegedly told Roby they would select him 24th overall during their pre-draft visit, they instead selected Darqueze Dennard who unexpectedly fell in the first round. The San Diego Chargers also showed serious interest in Roby, but both teams chose to select different cornerbacks following his arrest, with the Chargers selecting Jason Verrett (25th overall) and the Bengals selecting Darqueze Dennard (24th overall). Head coach John Fox stated Roby likely fell due to character concerns.

On June 10, 2014, the Broncos signed Roby to a four–year, $6.95 million contract that included $5.58 million guaranteed and a signing bonus of $3.37 million.

Throughout training camp, he competed against Chris Harris Jr., Tony Carter, and Kayvon Webster for the starting cornerback role. Fox named Roby the third cornerback on the depth chart to start the 2014 season, behind veterans Aqib Talib and Chris Harris Jr.

He made his professional regular season debut in the Broncos' season-opener against the Indianapolis Colts and recorded a season-high seven solo tackles and three pass deflections during their 31–24 victory. Roby also made a key deflection while covering Reggie Wayne in the fourth quarter to seal the victory for the Broncos. In Week 6, Roby made three combined tackles, two pass deflections, and had his first career sack on New York Jets quarterback Geno Smith in the Broncos' 31–17 victory. On November 2, 2014, Roby recorded two combined tackles, two pass deflections, a forced fumble, and had his first career interception off a pass attempt by New England Patriots quarterback Tom Brady in the Broncos' 43–21 loss. The following week, he collected four combined tackles, defended two passes, and intercepted Derek Carr during a 41–17 win against the Oakland Raiders. On November 23, 2014, Roby earned his first career start and had four solo tackles and a pass deflection during a 39–36 victory against the Miami Dolphins. Roby finished his rookie season in 2014 with a career-high 65 combined tackles (63 solo), 13 pass deflections, two interceptions, one sack, and a forced fumble in 16 games and two starts.

The Broncos finished first in the AFC West with a 12–4 record, clinching a playoff berth. On January 11, 2015, Roby appeared in his first career playoff game and recorded two solo tackles, a pass deflection, and intercepted Andrew Luck during a 24–13 loss to the Colts in the AFC Divisional round. The Broncos and head coach John Fox agreed to part ways during the offseason.

==== 2015 ====
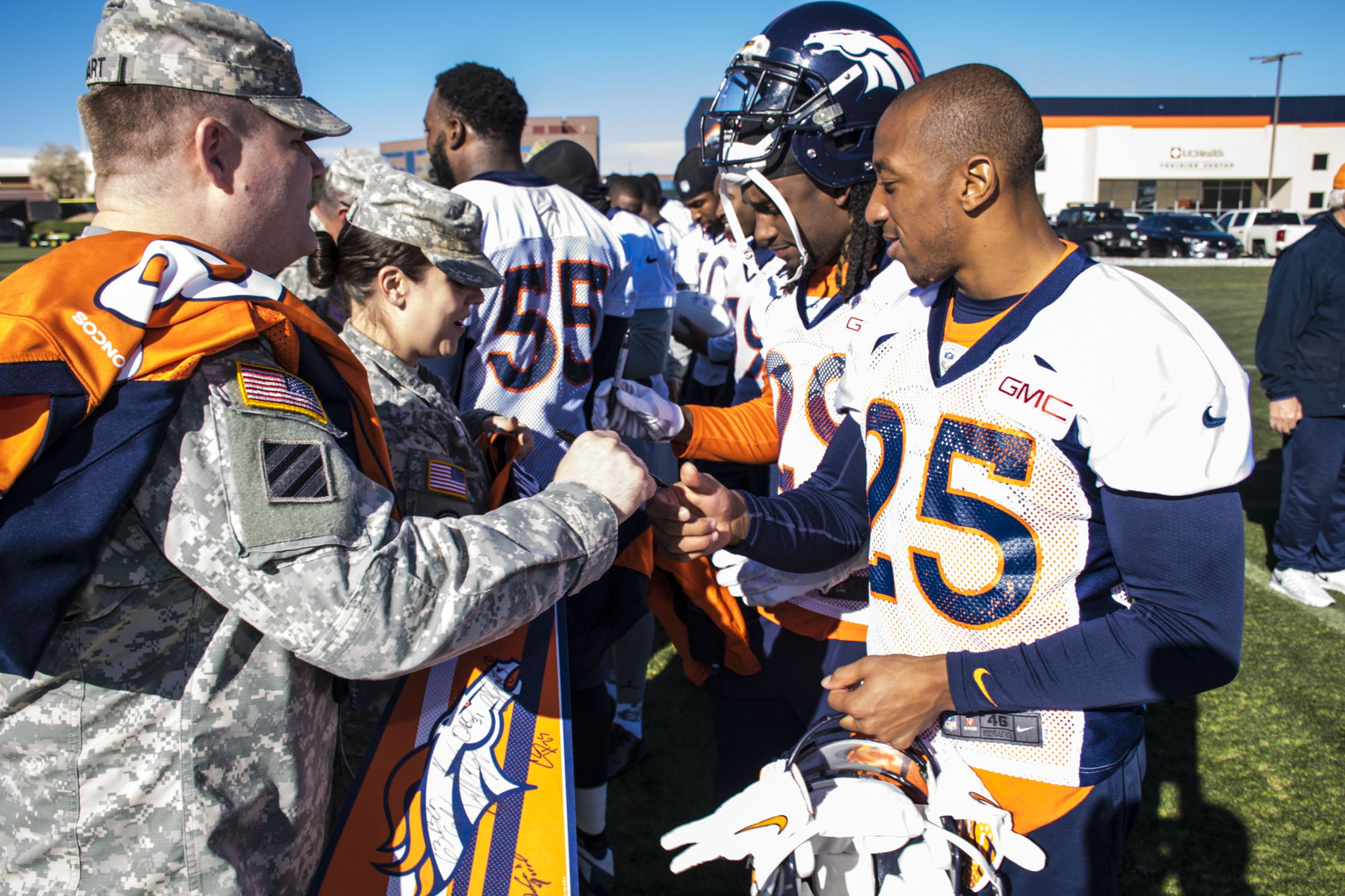
Roby along with Chris Harris Jr. signing autographs in 2015

Newly appointed head coach Gary Kubiak named Roby the starting nickelback and the third cornerback on the team behind Aqib Talib and Chris Harris Jr to begin the regular season.

In Week 2, Roby returned a fumble by Jamaal Charles for a touchdown in the final seconds of the fourth quarter to give the Broncos a 31–24 victory over the Kansas City Chiefs. The following week, he made two solo tackles, deflected a pass, and intercepted Matthew Stafford during the Broncos' 24–12 victory at the Detroit Lions. On December 20, 2015, Roby tied his season-high with five solo tackles in a 34–27 loss at the Steelers. He finished the 2015 season with 40 combined tackles (34 solo), ten pass deflections, an interception, and a fumble recovery in 16 games and four starts. The Broncos' secondary ranked first in overall grade by Pro Football Focus and was named the "No Fly Zone". Roby received an overall grade of 81.0 by PFF in 2015.

The Broncos finished first in their division with a 12–4 record and received a first round bye. On January 17, 2016, he made three solo tackles and forced a key fumble by Steelers' running back Fitzgerald Toussaint to set up a go-ahead touchdown drive by the Broncos and defeat the Steelers. The following week, he intercepted a tipped pass by teammate Aqib Talib on a two-point conversion to preserve a fourth-quarter 20–18 victory over the Patriots to win the AFC championship. On February 7, 2016, Roby appeared in Super Bowl 50 and recorded two solo tackles and three pass deflections in the Broncos' 24–10 victory over the Carolina Panthers.

==== 2016 ====
Roby remained the third cornerback under defensive coordinator Wade Phillips for the second consecutive season. On October 30, 2016, Roby recorded a season-high seven combined tackles, deflected two passes, and returned an interception off Philip Rivers for a 49-yard touchdown during a 27–19 victory over the Chargers. It marked the first time Roby returned an interception for a touchdown. In Week 13, he collected three solo tackle, defended two passes, and returned an interception by Blake Bortles for a 51-yard touchdown in Denver's 20–10 win at the Jacksonville Jaguars. Roby finished the season with 39 combined tackles (34 solo), eight pass deflections, two interceptions, two touchdowns, and a sack in 16 games and four starts. Without quarterback Peyton Manning leading the offense, the Broncos finished the 2016 season third in the AFC West with a 9–7 record and did not qualify for the playoffs. Kubiak retired after the season, citing issues with his health. The Broncos' secondary was ranked fourth by Pro Football Focus. Pro Football Focus gave Roby an overall grade of 58.9, ranking him 83rd among cornerbacks in 2016.

==== 2017 ====
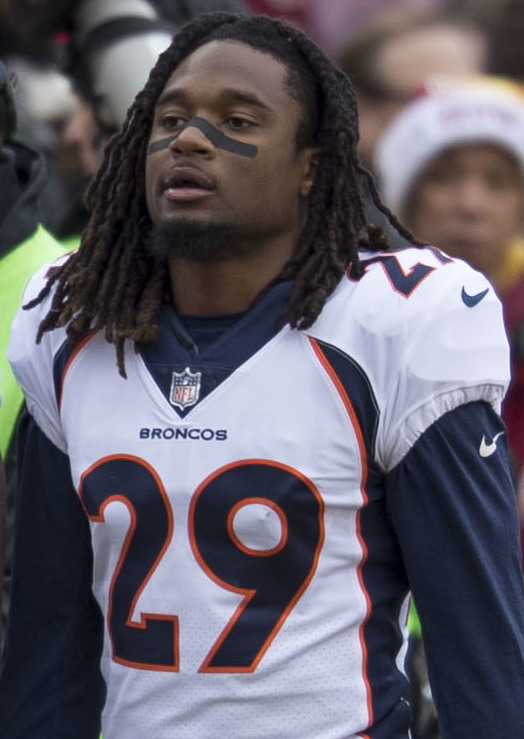
Roby with the Denver Broncos in 2017

On April 18, 2017, the Broncos announced they exercised the fifth-year, $8.52 million option on Roby's rookie contract. Roby remained the third cornerback behind Talib and Harris under new head coach Vance Joseph to start the 2017 regular season.

He played in the Broncos' season-opener against the Los Angeles Chargers on Monday Night Football and recorded five combined tackles, two pass deflections, and intercepted a pass attempt by quarterback Philip Rivers to set up a touchdown drive by the Broncos in their 24–21 comeback victory. On November 5, 2017, Roby recorded a season-high five solo tackles and deflected a pass during a 51–23 loss at the Philadelphia Eagles. He finished the 2017 season with 42 combined tackles (35 solo), a career-high 17 pass deflections, an interception, and one sack in 16 games and four starts. Roby played in 64 consecutive games and did not miss a game over the course of four seasons. The Broncos finished last in the AFC West with a 5–11 record and did not qualify for the playoffs for the second season in a row. Pro Football Focus gave Roby an overall grade of 84.0 in 2017 and his grade ranked 25th among all cornerbacks.

==== 2018 ====
With Roby having impressed in his years as a backup, the general consensus heading into the 2018 season was that he was a high-quality defensive back deserving of a full-time starting role. This consensus convinced Broncos president of football operations John Elway to move on from Talib, trading him to the Rams, and to promote Roby to one of Denver's two starting cornerbacks. However, Roby had a disappointing 2018 season, as his Pro Football Focus player grade plummeted to just 59.9. His head coach publicly called him "inconsistent," and low point came when he was called out on national television in a December 24 Monday Night Football broadcast by commentator Jason Witten for perceived lack of effort.

=== Houston Texans ===
On March 14, 2019, Roby signed a one-year, $10 million contract with the Houston Texans. Roby made his debut with the Texans in Week 1 against the New Orleans Saints. In the game, Roby made nine tackles in the 30–28 loss. In Week 13 against the New England Patriots on Sunday Night Football, Roby recorded his first interception of the season off a pass thrown by Tom Brady and returned it for 22 yards during the 28–22 win. In Week 16 against the Tampa Bay Buccaneers, Roby intercepted a pass thrown by Jameis Winston and returned it for a 27-yard touchdown during the 23–20 win.

On April 3, 2020, Roby signed a three-year, $36 million contract with the Texans. In Week 6 against the Tennessee Titans, Roby recorded his first interception of the season off a pass thrown by Ryan Tannehill during the 42–36 overtime loss. On November 30, Roby was suspended six games for violating the NFL's performance-enhancing drug policy.

=== New Orleans Saints ===
On September 8, 2021, Roby was traded to the New Orleans Saints in exchange for a 2022 third round selection and a conditional 2023 sixth round selection. On November 25, Roby recorded his first interception as a Saint and of the season against Josh Allen and the Buffalo Bills in a 31–6 loss on Thanksgiving.

Roby entered the 2022 season as a starting cornerback opposite Marshon Lattimore. He suffered an ankle injury in Week 7 against the. Arizona Cardinals and was placed on injured reserve on October 25, 2022. Roby was activated on November 26.

On August 29, 2023, Roby was released by the Saints as a part of final roster cuts.

=== Philadelphia Eagles ===
On October 3, 2023, Roby signed with the practice squad of the Philadelphia Eagles after fielding interest from multiple teams. He was signed to the team's active roster on October 13. Roby made nine appearances (including two starts) for Philadelphia, recording one forced fumble and 22 combined tackles.

== NFL career statistics ==
Legend
	Won the Super Bowl
	Led the league
**Bold**	Career high

Year	Team	Games		Tackles				Fumbles				Interceptions					
Year	Team	GP	GS	Cmb	Solo	Ast	Sck	FF	FR	Yds	TD	Int	Yds	Avg	Lng	TD	PD
2014	DEN	**16**	2	**65**	**63**	2	**1.0**	**2**	**2**	3	0	**2**	0	0.0	0	0	13
2015	DEN	**16**	4	40	34	6	0.0	1	1	**21**	**1**	1	19	19.0	19	0	10
2016	DEN	**16**	4	39	34	5	**1.0**	1	0	0	0	**2**	**102**	**51.0**	**51**	**2**	8
2017	DEN	**16**	4	42	35	**7**	**1.0**	1	1	0	0	1	0	0.0	0	0	**17**
2018	DEN	15	**15**	50	45	5	0.0	**2**	0	0	0	1	0	0.0	0	0	12
2019	HOU	10	10	38	35	3	**1.0**	1	0	0	0	**2**	49	24.5	27	1	8
2020	HOU	10	10	37	33	4	0.0	0	1	0	0	1	0	0.0	0	0	7
2021	NO	14	1	23	19	4	**1.0**	0	0	0	0	1	2	2.0	2	0	5
2022	NO	13	10	36	29	**7**	0.0	0	**2**	6	0	0	0	0	0	0	5
2023	PHI	9	2	22	19	3	0.0	1	0	0	0	0	0	0	0	0	0
Career		135	62	392	346	46	5.0	9	7	30	1	11	172	15.6	51	3	85

== Personal life ==
Roby was raised by his mother, Betty Roby, in Suwanee, Georgia, and admires her for raising him as a single mother. His father, James Roby, was not around during his childhood. He has a dog named Young Nino, and is good friends with Steve Atwater after growing up being friends with his son, Steve Atwater Jr.

=== Legal issues ===
On July 24, 2013, Roby was arrested and charged with misdemeanor battery. The police report states that the Bloomington Police responded to a call at 2:40AM at Dunkirk Bar. When they arrived, Roby was being detained by private security after an incident where he was removed from the establishment after he attempted to start a fight with another patron. Roby re-entered the establishment to try to find his friends and was stopped by security. While being confronted, he allegedly struck the security guard in the chest and was immediately taken down by force until police arrived. On August 21, 2013, the case was conditionally dismissed after Roby pleaded guilty to misdemeanor disorderly conduct and agreed to complete a pre-trial diversion program. Under the terms of the agreement, Roby was required to stay out of legal trouble until August 16, 2014.

On April 20, 2014, Roby was charged with physical control of a motor vehicle while under the influence of drugs or alcohol from an incident that occurred on April 20. The police report filed with Franklin County court states Columbus Police responded to a call about a drunk driver of a Dodge Charger that nearly hit kids walking on the sidewalk. The officers arrived to find Roby passed out in the driver seat of his vehicle. After Roby did not respond to officers, they opened the door to the vehicle and smelled an alcohol like odor. It appeared Roby was under the influence after another officer responded and conducted a field sobriety test, which he failed. On April 29, 2014, Roby pleaded guilty to physical control of a motor vehicle while under the influence of drugs or alcohol and was charged with a suspended sentence of 180 days in jail. Under the terms of the sentence, he was required to attend a three-day driver intervention program and pay a $375 fine plus court costs.
