= Coffee County Central High School =

Location
- 100 Red Raider Drive; Manchester, Tennessee; United States; 35.44697°N 86.09454°W

Information
- Type: Public
- School district: Coffee County School District
- Principal: Paul Parsley
- Teaching staff: 73.33 (FTE)
- Grades: 10 to 12
- Enrollment: 1,287 (2023-2024)
- Student to teacher ratio: 17.55
- Colors: Red and Black
- Athletics conference: TSSAA
- Mascot: Red Raiders
- Team name: The Red Raiders
- Publication: The EDGE; The Raider Yearbook
- Website: chs.coffeecountyschools.com/

Coffee County Central High School is a public high school located in Manchester, Tennessee. The school serves about 1,600 students in the Coffee County School District.

== Athletics ==
Coffee County Central competes in TSSAA's Division I Class 4A.

Coffee County Central offers baseball/softball, boys' and girls' basketball, cross country, football, golf, tennis, track and field, wrestling. Historically, the school has been known for its extensive track and cross country victories.

Team State Titles
Year	Sport	Class	Award	Details
1974	Girls' Track and Field		440 Yard Relay Champions	
1974	Girls' Track and Field		Champions	
1993	Girls' Basketball	Class AAA	Champions	(32-3)
1993	Girls' Track and Field	Class AAA	Runner-Up	
2014	Girls' Golf	Class AAA	Runner-Up	
2016	Girls' Golf	Class AAA	Runner-Up	
2021	Softball	Class AAA	Runner-Up	(34-7-1)

Individual State Titles
Year	Sport	Class	Award	Details / Names
1974	Girls' Track and Field		High Jump Champions	Carla Tart
1979	Boys' Track and Field		Mile Run Champion	Carey Waltrip
1980	Boys' Cross Country			John Young
1981	Boys' Track and Field	Class AAA	3200 Meter Run Champion	John Young
1993	Girls' Track and Field	Class AAA	300 Meter Low Hurdles Champion	Leslie Henley
1993	Girls' Track and Field	Class AAA	Discus Champion	Megan Burch
1993	Girls' Track and Field	Class AAA	Long Jump Champion	Leslie Henley
1993	Girls' Track and Field	Class AAA	Pentathlon Champion	Leslie Henley
2004	Boys' Track and Field	Class AAA	3200 Meter Run Champion	Alan Knox
2024	Boys' Track and Field	Class AAA	Discus Champion	Xavier Randolph
