= Lewis Kidd (American football) =

American football player (born 1997)

No. 66, 69
- Position: Offensive tackle

Personal information
- Born: September 15, 1997 (age 29); Minneapolis, Minnesota, U.S.
- Listed height: 6 ft 6 in (1.98 m)
- Listed weight: 311 lb (141 kg)

Career information
- High school: Totino-Grace (MN)
- College: Montana State (2016–2021)
- NFL draft: 2022: undrafted

Career history
- New Orleans Saints (2022); Indianapolis Colts (2023–2024)*; San Francisco 49ers (2024)*
- * Offseason or practice squad member only

Awards and highlights
- Consensus FCS All-American (2021)

Career NFL statistics
- Games played: 13
- Games started: 1
- Stats at Pro Football Reference

Tyrone Lewis Kidd (born September 15, 1997) is an American former professional football offensive tackle. He played college football at Montana State and has previously played in the NFL for the New Orleans Saints.

== Professional career ==
Pre-draft measurables
Height	Weight	Arm length	Hand span	40-yard dash	10-yard split	20-yard split	20-yard shuttle	Three-cone drill	Vertical jump	Broad jump	Bench press
6 ft 5 5/8 in (1.97 m)	312 lb (142 kg)	35 in (0.89 m)	10 3/8 in (0.26 m)	5.20 s	1.79 s	3.00 s	4.72 s	7.78 s	28.5 in (0.72 m)	8 ft 10 in (2.69 m)	26 reps
All values from Pro Day

=== New Orleans Saints ===
Kidd signed with the New Orleans Saints as an undrafted free agent on April 30, 2022, following the 2022 NFL draft. He made the Saints' final 53 man roster after training camp.

On August 29, 2023, Kidd was waived by the Saints.

=== Indianapolis Colts ===
On September 14, 2023, Kidd was signed to the Indianapolis Colts' practice squad. He was released on December 19.

On January 9, 2024, Kidd signed a reserve/future contract with the Colts. He was waived on July 31.

=== San Francisco 49ers ===
On August 5, 2024, Kidd signed with the San Francisco 49ers. He was waived on August 26.
