= Ryan Nielsen =

American football player and coach (born 1979)

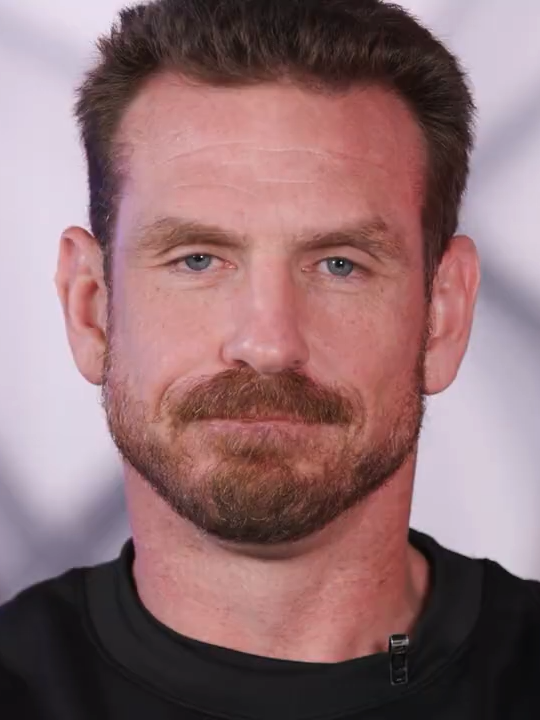
- Nielsen in 2023

Minnesota Vikings
- Title: Defensive running game coordinator

Personal information
- Born: March 20, 1979 (age 47); Los Angeles, California, U.S.
- Listed height: 6 ft 5 in (1.96 m)
- Listed weight: 285 lb (129 kg)

Career information
- Position: Defensive tackle
- High school: Royal (Simi Valley, California)
- College: USC (1997–2001)
- NFL draft: 2002: undrafted

Career history

Playing
- Philadelphia Eagles (2002)*; Los Angeles Avengers (2004)
- * Offseason or practice squad member only

Coaching
- USC (2002) Volunteer assistant; Ole Miss (2005–2007) Defensive line coach; Central Connecticut State (2008–2009) Defensive coordinator & defensive line coach; UT Martin (2010) Defensive line coach & special teams coach; Northern Illinois (2011-2012); Defensive line coach & recruiting coordinator (2011); Co-defensive coordinator, defensive line coach & recruiting coordinator (2012); NC State (2013-2016); Defensive line coach & recruiting coordinator (2013); Defensive line coach & run game coordinator (2014-2016); New Orleans Saints (2017–2022); Defensive line coach (2017-2020); Assistant head coach & defensive line coach (2021); Co-defensive coordinator & defensive line coach (2022); Atlanta Falcons (2023) Defensive coordinator & defensive line coach; Jacksonville Jaguars (2024) Defensive coordinator; Buffalo Bills (2025) Senior defensive assistant; Minnesota Vikings (2026–present) Defensive running game coordinator

Operations
- Idaho (2004) Administrative assistant
- Coaching profile at Pro Football Reference
- Stats at ArenaFan.com

Ryan Nielsen (born March 20, 1979) is an American football coach and former defensive tackle who is the defensive running game coordinator currently for the Minnesota Vikings of the National Football League (NFL). He signed with the Philadelphia Eagles in 2002 as an undrafted free agent.

== Playing career ==
Nielsen played defensive tackle at USC from 1997 to 2001, where he started 30 games and garnered an All-Pac 10 honorable mention in 1999. Upon graduating from USC in 2002, he signed a contract with the Philadelphia Eagles in 2002 but did not make it past training camp. He also spent time with the Los Angeles Avengers of the Arena Football League.

== Coaching career ==
Nielsen began his coaching career as a volunteer assistant at his alma mater USC in 2002. He also spent time as an administrative assistant at Idaho under former USC assistant Nick Holt. He was hired away as a graduate assistant at Ole Miss under his position coach at USC, Ed Orgeron, and was promoted to defensive line coach before the season began. He also had stints at Central Connecticut State and UT Martin before being hired at Northern Illinois in 2011 as a co-defensive coordinator. He followed Huskies head coach Dave Doeren to NC State in 2013 to serve as his defensive line coach and recruiting coordinator. He added the title of run game coordinator in 2014.

=== New Orleans Saints ===
Nielsen was hired as the defensive line coach for the New Orleans Saints on February 9, 2017.

Nielsen was offered the defensive coordinator position at LSU in 2021, but elected to remain with the Saints where he was promoted with the added title of assistant head coach in 2021.

Nielsen was promoted to co-defensive coordinator for the New Orleans Saints in 2022.

=== Atlanta Falcons ===
On January 27, 2023, Nielsen was hired as defensive coordinator for the Atlanta Falcons.

In Nielsen's first year with the Falcons, the overall defensive rankings improved from 23rd to 18th in points allowed per game and from 27th to 11th in yards allowed per game. The Falcons also doubled their sack total (42) from the previous season (21).

=== Jacksonville Jaguars ===
On January 22, 2024, Nielsen was hired as defensive coordinator for the Jacksonville Jaguars. Nielsen ended up being the worst defensive coordinator from a defensive rank statistical standpoint Jaguars franchise history. The Jaguar's defense gave up the most points per game ever by the team in one year. He was fired as part of Doug Pederson's staff being fired on January 6, 2025.

=== Buffalo Bills ===
On February 6, 2025, the Buffalo Bills hired Nielsen as a senior defensive assistant.

=== Minnesota Vikings ===
On February 3, 2026, the Minnesota Vikings hired Nielsen to serve as the team's defensive running game coordinator.
