= 2019 Carolina Panthers season =

American football team season

- Owner: David Tepper
- General manager: Marty Hurney
- Head coach: Ron Rivera (fired on December 3; 5–7 record); Perry Fewell (interim, 0–4 record)
- Home stadium: Bank of America Stadium

Results
- Record: 5–11
- Division place: 4th NFC South
- Playoffs: Did not qualify
- All-Pros: RB, Flex Christian McCaffrey (1st team); ILB Luke Kuechly (2nd team)
- Pro Bowlers: ILB Luke Kuechly; RB Christian McCaffrey; G Trai Turner (alternate)

Uniform
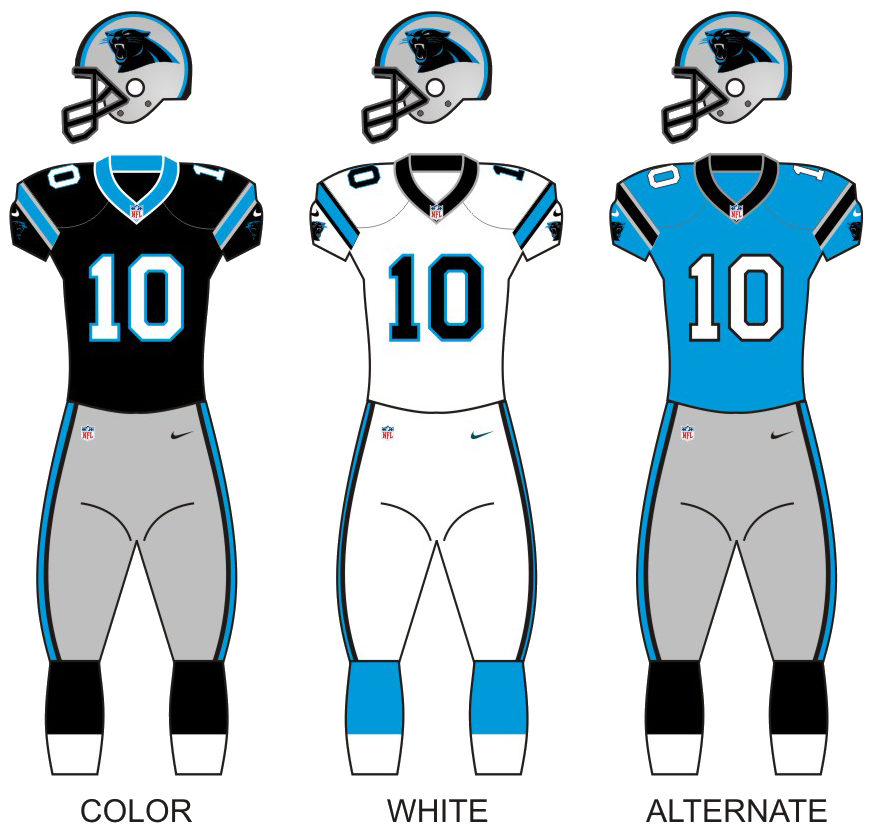

The 2019 season was the Carolina Panthers' 25th in the National Football League (NFL), and their ninth and last under head coach Ron Rivera. The Panthers played in London as part of the NFL International Series for the first time in franchise history. This for first time since 2004 Thomas Davis was not on the opening day roster and for first time since 2006 Ryan Kalil was not on the opening roster.

Despite suffering their first 0–2 start since 2013, they had a 5–3 record coming into week 10 of the season. However, their futility from the previous year repeated itself. They suffered an eight-game losing streak (their worst since 2001, where they finished 1–15) to end the season badly with a 5–11 record. Not only were they unable to improve upon their 7–9 record from the previous season, but they were also mathematically eliminated from postseason contention for the second consecutive season and for the third time in the past four seasons after losing to the Denver Broncos in Super Bowl 50 in 2015 (they finished the season with a 15–1 record) after a 20–40 loss to division rivals Atlanta Falcons coming into Week 14 of the season. After a Week 4 win over the Jacksonville Jaguars on October 6, 2019, head coach Ron Rivera surpassed John Fox to become the franchise's winningest head coach of all time. However, on December 3, two days after a loss to the Washington Redskins, Rivera was fired after nearly nine seasons as head coach and due to new ownership wanting a change within the organization. Cam Newton suffered a season-ending foot injury after playing in the first 2 weeks of the season, and was replaced by rookie quarterbacks Will Grier and Kyle Allen. On October 7, Kyle Allen became the first undrafted quarterback to win their first 4 starts since Kurt Warner did so during the St. Louis Rams' 1999 Super Bowl-winning season.

The 2019 season marked the end of an era for the Panthers franchise. In addition to it being Rivera's final season in Carolina, it was also linebacker Luke Kuechly's final season in the NFL, as he retired following the conclusion of the season. It was also the final season of Cam Newton's first tenure in Carolina; he would re-sign with the team during the 2021 season.

== NFL draft ==
2019 Carolina Panthers draft
Round	Pick	Player	Position	College	Notes
1	16	Brian Burns *	OLB	Florida State	
2	37	Greg Little	OT	Ole Miss	
3	100	Will Grier	QB	West Virginia	
4	115	Christian Miller	OLB	Alabama	
5	154	Jordan Scarlett	RB	Florida	
6	212	Dennis Daley	OT	South Carolina	
7	237	Terry Godwin	WR	Georgia	
Made roster † Pro Football Hall of Fame * Made at least one Pro Bowl during career

Notes

- As the result of a negative differential of free agent signings and departures that the Panthers experienced during the 2018 free agency period, the team received one compensatory selection for the 2019 draft. Exact numbers of the selections from rounds 4–7 were determined at the NFL's annual spring owners' meetings.

== Staff ==
2019 Carolina Panthers staff
Front office: Owner – David Tepper; President – Tom Glick; General manager – Marty Hurney; Director of football operations – Bryan Porter; Assistant Director of football operations – Mike Anderson; Director of football administration – Rob Rogers; Director of pro personnel – Matt Allen; Senior director of college scouting – Jeff Morrow; Regional director of college scouting – Mike Szabo; Regional director of college scouting – Eric Stokes; Executive assistant to the head coach – Linda O'Hora; Executive director of football staff – Mark Carrier; Director of football analytics – Taylor Rajack; Head coaches: Head coach - Ron Rivera; Offensive coaches: Special assistant to the head coach/offensive coordinator – Norv Turner; Interim offensive coordinator/quarterbacks – Scott Turner; Running backs – Jake Peetz; Wide receivers – Jim Hostler; Assistant wide receivers – Jerricho Cotchery; Tight ends – Pete Hoener; Running game coordinator – John Matsko; Assistant offensive line – Travelle Wharton; Offensive quality control – Drew Terrell	Defensive coaches: Defensive coordinator – Eric Washington; Defensive line/game management – Sam Mills III; Linebackers – Steve Russ; Assistant linebackers – Everette Brown; Interim head coach/secondary – Perry Fewell; Safeties – Richard Rodgers; Defensive quality control – Vincent Rivera; Special teams coaches: Special teams coordinator – Chase Blackburn; Assistant special teams – Ben Jacobs; Strength and conditioning: Strength and conditioning – Joe Kenn; Assistant strength and conditioning – Jason Benguche

== Final roster ==
2019 Carolina Panthers roster
Quarterbacks (QB): 7 Kyle Allen; 3 Will Grier; Running backs (RB): 40 Alex Armah FB; 39 Reggie Bonnafon; 27 Mike Davis; 22 Christian McCaffrey; Wide receivers (WR): 15 Chris Hogan; 12 D. J. Moore; 10 Curtis Samuel; 18 DeAndrew White; 13 Jarius Wright; 11 Brandon Zylstra; Tight ends (TE): 82 Chris Manhertz; 88 Greg Olsen; 80 Ian Thomas	Offensive linemen (OL): 65 Dennis Daley G; 63 Matt Kaskey T; 69 Tyler Larsen C; 72 Taylor Moton T; 61 Matt Paradis C; 64 Chris Reed G; 70 Trai Turner G; 60 Daryl Williams T; Defensive linemen (DL): 97 Mario Addison DE; 53 Brian Burns DE; 92 Vernon Butler DT; 78 Woodrow Hamilton DT; 96 Wes Horton DE; 55 Bruce Irvin DE; 77 Kyle Love DT; 93 Gerald McCoy DT; 91 Stacy McGee DT; 94 Efe Obada DE	Linebackers (LB): 56 Jermaine Carter OLB; 98 Marquis Haynes OLB; 59 Luke Kuechly MLB; 43 Jordan Kunaszyk OLB; 50 Christian Miller OLB; 57 Andre Smith MLB; 54 Shaq Thompson OLB; Defensive backs (DB): 33 Tre Boston FS; 24 James Bradberry CB; 47 Ross Cockrell CB; 29 Corn Elder CB; 23 Javien Elliott CB; 36 T. J. Green SS; 26 Donte Jackson CB; 42 Colin Jones FS; 32 Cole Luke CB; 25 Eric Reid SS; Special teams (ST): 44 J. J. Jansen LS; 5 Michael Palardy P; 4 Joey Slye K	Practice squad: 37 Quin Blanding SS; 67 Greg Gilmore DT; 35 Dominique Hatfield CB; 84 Temarrick Hemingway TE; 21 Elijah Holyfield RB; 71 Bijhon Jackson DT (IR); 83 Damion Jeanpiere WR; 68 Tyler Marz T; 62 Aaron Monteiro T; 46 Sione Teuhema OLB; 16 Bobo Wilson WR; Reserve: 85 Marcus Baugh TE (IR); 9 Graham Gano K (IR); 66 Dillon Gordon T (IR); 75 Brandon Greene T (IR); 30 Natrell Jamerson SS (IR); 74 Greg Little T (IR); 76 Garrett McGhin T (IR); 1 Cam Newton QB (IR); -- Kitt O'Brien G (IR); 95 Dontari Poe NT (IR); 20 Jordan Scarlett RB (IR); 99 Kawann Short DE (IR); 73 Greg Van Roten G (IR); Rookies in italics 53 active, 14 reserve, 10 practice squad

== Preseason ==
Week	Date	Opponent	Result	Record	Venue	Recap
1	August 8	at Chicago Bears	W 23–13	1–0	Soldier Field	Recap
2	August 16	Buffalo Bills	L 14–27	1–1	Bank of America Stadium	Recap
3	August 22	at New England Patriots	L 3–10	1–2	Gillette Stadium	Recap
4	August 29	Pittsburgh Steelers	W 25–19	2–2	Bank of America Stadium	Recap

== Regular season ==
=== Schedule ===
Week	Date	Opponent	Result	Record	Venue	Recap
1	September 8	Los Angeles Rams	**L** 27–30	0–1	Bank of America Stadium	Recap
2	September 12	**Tampa Bay Buccaneers**	**L** 14–20	0–2	Bank of America Stadium	Recap
3	September 22	at Arizona Cardinals	**W** 38–20	1–2	State Farm Stadium	Recap
4	September 29	at Houston Texans	**W** 16–10	2–2	NRG Stadium	Recap
5	October 6	Jacksonville Jaguars	**W** 34–27	3–2	Bank of America Stadium	Recap
6	October 13	at **Tampa Bay Buccaneers**	**W** 37–26	4–2	(United Kingdom) Tottenham Hotspur Stadium (London)	Recap
7	Bye					
8	October 27	at San Francisco 49ers	**L** 13–51	4–3	Levi's Stadium	Recap
9	November 3	Tennessee Titans	**W** 30–20	5–3	Bank of America Stadium	Recap
10	November 10	at Green Bay Packers	**L** 16–24	5–4	Lambeau Field	Recap
11	November 17	**Atlanta Falcons**	**L** 3–29	5–5	Bank of America Stadium	Recap
12	November 24	at **New Orleans Saints**	**L** 31–34	5–6	Mercedes-Benz Superdome	Recap
13	December 1	Washington Redskins	**L** 21–29	5–7	Bank of America Stadium	Recap
14	December 8	at **Atlanta Falcons**	**L** 20–40	5–8	Mercedes-Benz Stadium	Recap
15	December 15	Seattle Seahawks	**L** 24–30	5–9	Bank of America Stadium	Recap
16	December 22	at Indianapolis Colts	**L** 6–38	5–10	Lucas Oil Stadium	Recap
17	December 29	**New Orleans Saints**	**L** 10–42	5–11	Bank of America Stadium	Recap

Note: Intra-division opponents are in bold text.

=== Game summaries ===
==== Week 1: vs. Los Angeles Rams ====
Week One: Los Angeles Rams at Carolina Panthers – Game summary

Quarter	1	2	3	4	Total
**Rams**	0	13	10	7	**30**
Panthers	0	3	10	14	**27**

at Bank of America Stadium, Charlotte, North Carolina

- Date: September 8
- Game time: 1:00 p.m. EDT
- Game weather: Sunny, 87 °F (31 °C)
- Game attendance: 72,005
- Referee: Shawn Hochuli
- TV announcers (Fox): Chris Myers, Daryl Johnston and Laura Okmin
- Recap, Game Book

Game information

**First quarter**

- No scoring plays.

**Second quarter**

- LAR – Greg Zuerlein 49-yard field goal, 13:43. Rams 3–0. **Drive: 7 plays, 26 yards, 1:58.**
- LAR – Malcolm Brown 5-yard run (Greg Zuerlein kick), 12:44. Rams 10–0. **Drive: 2 plays, 10 yards, 0:23.**
- LAR – Greg Zuerlein 56-yard field goal, 1:02. Rams 13–0. **Drive: 9 plays, 33 yards, 3:54.**
- CAR – Joey Slye 46-yard field goal, 0:00. Rams 13–3. **Drive: 8 plays, 47 yards, 1:02.**

**Third quarter**

- LAR – Greg Zuerlein 27–yard field goal, 11:53. Rams 16–3. **Drive: 7 plays, 66 yards, 3:07.**
- CAR – Christian McCaffrey 8-yard run (Greg Zuerlein kick), 8:28. Rams 16–10. **Drive: 8 plays, 60 yards, 3:25.**
- LAR – Malcolm Brown 1-yard run (Greg Zuerlein kick), 2:51. Rams 23–10. **Drive: 13 plays, 75 yards, 5:37.**
- CAR – Joey Slye 52-yard field goal, 0:11. Rams 23–13. **Drive: 8 plays, 36 yards, 2:40.**

**Fourth quarter**

- CAR – Christian McCaffrey 2-yard run (Joey Slye kick), 13:10. Rams 23–20. **Drive: 2 plays, 5 yards, 0:28.**
- LAR – Tyler Higbee 5-yard pass from Jared Goff (Greg Zuerlein kick), 6:37. Rams 30–20. **Drive: 7 plays, 57 yards, 3:54.**
- CAR – Alexander Armah 1-yard run (Joey Slye kick), 1:58. Rams 30–27. **Drive: 9 plays, 69 yards, 2:08.**

**Top passers**

- LAR – Jared Goff – 23/39, 186 yards, TD, INT
- CAR – Cam Newton – 25/38, 239 yards, INT

**Top rushers**

- LAR – Todd Gurley – 14 rushes, 97 yards
- CAR – Christian McCaffrey – 19 rushes, 128 yards, 2 TD

**Top receivers**

- LAR – Robert Woods – 8 receptions, 70 yards
- CAR – Christian McCaffrey – 10 receptions, 81 yards

It was a scoreless first quarter in the Panthers' home opener against the Los Angeles Rams. In the second, the Rams scored 13 points, but with two seconds to go in the half, Joey Slye made a field goal for Carolina. Early in the third, the Rams made another field goal. The Panthers answered back with a Christian McCaffrey touchdown plus a Slye field goal, making it 16–10. Towards the end of the third, the Rams scored a touchdown. Carolina followed with another field goal. At the beginning of the fourth, Carolina blocked a Rams punt and recovered it at the 5-yard line. They went on to score, making it a three-point game. Soon after, James Bradberry intercepted the ball, but they ended up having to punt it away. The Rams scored again to increase their lead to 10, before intercepting the ball from Carolina. With less than two minutes to go, Alexander Armah scored a touchdown for Carolina. Despite this, the Panthers still fell short and lost 30–27 to go 0–1.

==== Week 2: vs. Tampa Bay Buccaneers ====
Week Two: Tampa Bay Buccaneers at Carolina Panthers – Game summary

Quarter	1	2	3	4	Total
**Buccaneers**	3	7	7	3	**20**
Panthers	3	6	3	2	**14**

at Bank of America Stadium, Charlotte, North Carolina

- Date: September 12
- Game time: 8:20 p.m. EDT
- Game weather: Cloudy, 85 °F (29 °C)
- Game attendance: 71,101
- Referee: Jerome Boger
- TV announcers (NFLN): Joe Buck, Troy Aikman, Erin Andrews and Kristina Pink
- Recap, Game Book

Game information

**First quarter**

- TB – Matt Gay 40-yard field goal, 5:36. Buccaneers 3–0. **Drive: 6 plays, 32 yards, 2:55.**
- CAR – Joey Slye 32-yard field goal, 2:52. Tied 3–3. **Drive: 8 plays, 61 yards, 2:44.**

**Second quarter**

- CAR – Joey Slye 37-yard field goal, 8:26. Panthers 6–3. **Drive: 5 plays, 23 yards, 1:29.**
- TB – Chris Godwin 20-yard pass from Jameis Winston (Matt Gay kick), 1:20. Buccaneers 10–6. **Drive: 5 plays, 72 yards, 2:27.**
- CAR – Joey Slye 54-yard field goal, 0:00. Buccaneers 10–9. **Drive: 9 plays, 39 yards, 1:20.**

**Third quarter**

- CAR – Joey Slye 51-yard field goal, 7:51. Panthers 12–10. **Drive: 6 plays, 29 yards, 3:30.**
- TB – Peyton Barber 16-yard run (Matt Gay kick), 4:20. Buccaneers 17–12. **Drive: 7 plays, 75 yards, 3:31.**

**Fourth quarter**

- CAR – Peyton Barber tackled in the end zone by Luke Kuechly for a safety, 13:21. Buccaneers 17–14.
- TB – Matt Gay 32-yard field goal, 2:26. Buccaneers 20–14. **Drive: 11 plays, 53 yards, 6:32.**

**Top passers**

- TB – Jameis Winston – 16/25, 208 yards, TD
- CAR – Cam Newton – 24/50, 324 yards

**Top rushers**

- TB – Peyton Barber – 23 rushes, 82 yards, TD
- CAR – Christian McCaffrey – 16 rushes, 37 yards

**Top receivers**

- TB – Chris Godwin – 8 receptions, 121 yards, TD
- CAR – Greg Olsen – 6 receptions, 110 yards

For the first time since 2013, the Panthers started the season 0–2.

==== Week 3: at Arizona Cardinals ====
Week Three: Carolina Panthers at Arizona Cardinals – Game summary

Quarter	1	2	3	4	Total
**Panthers**	0	14	14	10	**38**
Cardinals	7	3	10	0	**20**

at State Farm Stadium, Glendale, Arizona

- Date: September 22
- Game time: 4:05 p.m. EDT/1:05 p.m. MST
- Game weather: None (retractable roof closed)
- Game attendance: 60,104
- Referee: Craig Wrolstad
- TV announcers (Fox): Dan Hellie, Brady Quinn and Sarah Kustok
- Recap, Game Book

Game information

**First quarter**

- ARI – Larry Fitzgerald 1-yard pass from Kyler Murray (Zane Gonzalez kick), 4:30. Cardinals 7–0. **Drive: 14 plays, 74 yards, 6:17.**

**Second quarter**

- CAR – Curtis Samuel 5-yard pass from Kyle Allen (Joey Slye kick), 14:09. Tied 7–7. **Drive: 11 plays, 75 yards, 5:21.**
- ARI – Zane Gonzalez 34-yard field goal, 1:36. Cardinals 10–7. **Drive: 15 plays, 53 yards, 5:58.**
- CAR – D. J. Moore 52-yard pass from Kyle Allen (Joey Slye kick), 0:49. Panthers 14–10. **Drive: 3 plays, 75 yards, 0:47.**

**Third quarter**

- ARI – David Johnson 3-yard pass from Kyler Murray (Zane Gonzalez kick), 11:20. Cardinals 17–14. **Drive: 9 plays, 75 yards, 3:40.**
- CAR – Greg Olsen 3-yard pass from Kyle Allen (Joey Slye kick), 7:44. Panthers 21–17. **Drive: 7 plays, 75 yards, 3:36.**
- ARI – Zane Gonzalez 47-yard field goal, 2:47. Panthers 21–20. **Drive: 12 plays, 49 yards, 4:57.**
- CAR – Christian McCaffrey 76-yard run (Joey Slye kick), 1:53. Panthers 28–20. **Drive: 2 plays, 84 yards, 0:54.**

**Fourth quarter**

- CAR – Greg Olsen 3-yard pass from Kyle Allen (Joey Slye kick), 13:32. Panthers 35–20. **Drive: 6 plays, 22 yards, 2:42.**
- CAR – Joey Slye 36-yard field goal, 4:27. Panthers 38–20. **Drive: 4 plays, 4 yards, 0:18.**

**Top passers**

- CAR – Kyle Allen – 19/26, 261 yards, 4 TD
- ARI – Kyler Murray – 30/43, 173 yards, 2 TD, 2 INT

**Top rushers**

- CAR – Christian McCaffrey – 24 rushes, 153 yards, TD
- ARI – Kyler Murray – 8 rushes, 69 yards

**Top receivers**

- CAR – Greg Olsen – 6 receptions, 75 yards, 2 TD
- ARI – Christian Kirk – 10 receptions, 59 yards

In Week 3, Carolina traveled to Arizona for their first road trip of the season and both teams looking for their first win. This was also Kyle Allen's first start of the season at QB. The Cardinals were first on the board with a Larry Fitzgerald touchdown, before Curtis Samuel tied the scores with a touchdown for Carolina early in the second quarter. In the last two minutes of the half, Arizona retook the lead via a field goal, before Kyle Allen threw a 52-yard touchdown pass to D. J. Moore to give the Panthers a 14–10 lead at halftime. Arizona started off with the ball in the second half, and capping a 75-yard drive, Kyler Murray completed a 3-yard pass to David Johnson for a touchdown. However, their lead was brief, as Allen threw a 3-yard touchdown pass to Greg Olsen. The Cardinals reduced their deficit to a single point on their next series, as Zane Gonzalez made a 47-yard field goal. Ray-Ray McCloud was only able to return the ensuing kickoff to the Panthers 16, but a pair of runs from Christian McCaffrey, first for eight yards and then for 76 yards, put the Panthers up by eight points going into the final period, following a Kyler Murray interception on Arizona's next possession. In the fourth quarter, Greg Olsen picked up another 3-yard touchdown catch and Joey Slye added a 36-yard field goal to give the Panthers a 38–20 win, improving them to 1–2. This game would give the Panthers franchise all-time win number 200, with both regular season and playoff record at 200-203-1 at that point.

==== Week 4: at Houston Texans ====
Week Four: Carolina Panthers at Houston Texans – Game summary

Quarter	1	2	3	4	Total
**Panthers**	3	7	0	6	**16**
Texans	0	3	7	0	**10**

at NRG Stadium, Houston, Texas

- Date: September 29
- Game time: 1:00 p.m. EDT/12:00 p.m. CDT
- Game weather: None (retractable roof closed)
- Game attendance: 71,699
- Referee: Adrian Hill
- TV announcers (Fox): Kenny Albert, Ronde Barber and Lindsay Czarniak
- Recap, Game Book

Game information

**First quarter**

- CAR – Joey Slye 48-yard field goal, 2:23. Panthers 3–0. **Drive: 6 plays, 29 yards, 2:32.**

**Second quarter**

- HOU – Kaʻimi Fairbairn 37-yard field goal, 7:59. Tied 3–3. **Drive: 10 plays, 66 yards, 4:35.**
- CAR – Christian McCaffrey 3-yard run (Joey Slye kick), 1:08. Panthers 10–3. **Drive: 5 plays, 54 yards, 1:08.**

**Third quarter**

- HOU – Deshaun Watson 1-yard run (Kaʻimi Fairbairn kick), 8:39. Tied 10–10. **Drive: 4 plays, 18 yards, 1:48.**

**Fourth quarter**

- CAR – Joey Slye 55-yard field goal, 14:50. Panthers 13–10. **Drive: 9 plays, 42 yards, 3:50.**
- CAR – Joey Slye 26-yard field goal, 0:28. Panthers 16–10. **Drive: 7 plays, 25 yards, 3:37.**

**Top passers**

- CAR – Kyle Allen – 24/34, 232 yards
- HOU – Deshaun Watson – 21/33, 160 yards

**Top rushers**

- CAR – Christian McCaffrey – 27 rushes, 93 yards, TD
- HOU – Carlos Hyde – 12 rushes, 58 yards

**Top receivers**

- CAR – Christian McCaffrey – 10 receptions, 86 yards
- HOU – DeAndre Hopkins – 5 receptions, 41 yards

The Panthers defeat Houston 16–10 on the road and improve to 2–2.

==== Week 5: vs. Jacksonville Jaguars ====
Week Five: Jacksonville Jaguars at Carolina Panthers – Game summary

Quarter	1	2	3	4	Total
Jaguars	7	10	7	3	**27**
**Panthers**	14	7	7	6	**34**

at Bank of America Stadium, Charlotte, North Carolina

- Date: October 6
- Game time: 1:00 p.m. EDT
- Game weather: Cloudy, 72 °F (22 °C)
- Game attendance: 72,762
- Referee: Alex Kemp
- TV announcers (CBS): Andrew Catalon, James Lofton and A.J. Ross
- Recap, Game Book

Game information

**First quarter**

- CAR – Christian McCaffrey 5-yard run (Joey Slye kick), 9:23. Panthers 7–0. **Drive: 8 plays, 78 yards, 5:37.**
- JAX – D. J. Chark 37-yard pass from Gardner Minshew (Josh Lambo kick), 7:27. Tied 7–7. **Drive: 4 plays, 75 yards, 1:56.**
- CAR – Christian McCaffrey 18-yard pass from Kyle Allen (Joey Slye kick), 1:35. Panthers 14–7. **Drive: 3 plays, 24 yards, 1:51.**

**Second quarter**

- CAR – Brian Burns 56-yard fumble return (Joey Slye kick), 13:32. Panthers 21–7.
- JAX – D. J. Chark 11-yard pass from Gardner Minshew (Josh Lambo kick), 6:07. Panthers 21–14. **Drive: 6 plays, 83 yards, 3:39.**
- JAX – Josh Lambo 35-yard field goal, 0:58. Panthers 21–17. **Drive: 8 plays, 37 yards, 1:59.**

**Third quarter**

- CAR – Christian McCaffrey 84-yard run (Joey Slye kick), 13:49. Panthers 28–17. **Drive: 1 play, 84 yards, 0:12.**
- JAX – Leonard Fournette 1-yard run (Josh Lambo kick), 10:27. Panthers 28–24. **Drive: 6 plays, 75 yards, 3:22.**

**Fourth quarter**

- JAX – Josh Lambo 38-yard field goal, 5:52. Panthers 28–27. **Drive: 11 plays, 73 yards, 6:01.**
- CAR – Reggie Bonnafon 59-yard run (kick failed, wide right), 3:34. Panthers 34–27. **Drive: 4 plays, 75 yards, 2:18.**

**Top passers**

- JAX – Gardner Minshew – 26/44, 374 yards, 2 TD
- CAR – Kyle Allen – 17/30, 181 yards, TD

**Top rushers**

- JAX – Leonard Fournette – 23 rushes, 108 yards, TD
- CAR – Christian McCaffrey – 19 rushes, 176 yards, 2 TD

**Top receivers**

- JAX – D. J. Chark – 8 receptions, 164 yards, 2 TD
- CAR – D. J. Moore – 6 receptions, 91 yards

The Panthers get their third straight win, improving to 3–2. This regular season win was Ron Rivera's 74th, surpassing John Fox for the most regular season wins in franchise history with a record of 74-60-1 at that point.

==== Week 6: at Tampa Bay Buccaneers ====
NFL London Games

Week Six: Carolina Panthers at Tampa Bay Buccaneers – Game summary

Quarter	1	2	3	4	Total
**Panthers**	10	7	10	10	**37**
Buccaneers	0	7	3	16	**26**

at Tottenham Hotspur Stadium, London, England

- Date: October 13
- Game time: 2:30 p.m. BST/9:30 a.m. EDT
- Game weather: Mostly cloudy, 61 °F (16 °C)
- Game attendance: 60,087
- Referee: Walt Anderson
- TV announcers (NFLN): Rich Eisen, Kurt Warner, Steve Mariucci, Michael Irvin and Melissa Stark
- Recap, Game Book

Game information

**First quarter**

- CAR – Joey Slye 49-yard field goal, 13:20. Panthers 3–0. **Drive: 4 plays, −2 yards, 1:30.**
- CAR – Christian McCaffrey 1-yard run (Joey Slye kick), 1:05. Panthers 10–0. **Drive: 12 plays, 99 yards, 7:32.**

**Second quarter**

- TB – Ronald Jones 5-yard run (Matt Gay kick), 12:43. Panthers 10–7. **Drive: 3 plays, 37 yards, 1:19.**
- CAR – Christian McCaffrey 25-yard pass from Kyle Allen (Joey Slye kick), 7:32. Panthers 17–7. **Drive: 4 plays, 36 yards, 1:39.**

**Third quarter**

- CAR – Joey Slye 46-yard field goal, 8:21. Panthers 20–7. **Drive: 5 plays, 39 yards, 1:58.**
- CAR – Curtis Samuel 8-yard run (Joey Slye kick), 8:05. Panthers 27–7. **Drive: 1 play, 8 yards, 0:05.**
- TB – Matt Gay 54-yard field goal, 5:27. Panthers 27–10. **Drive: 7 plays, 39 yards, 2:38.**

**Fourth quarter**

- CAR – Curtis Samuel 13-yard pass from Kyle Allen (Joey Slye kick), 14:55. Panthers 34–10. **Drive: 10 plays, 75 yards, 5:32.**
- TB – Cameron Brate 10-yard pass from Jameis Winston (Jameis Winston–Mike Evans pass), 12:51. Panthers 34–18. **Drive: 6 plays, 75 yards, 2:04.**
- CAR – Joey Slye 29-yard field goal, 7:56. Panthers 37–18. **Drive: 4 plays, 6 yards, 1:59.**
- TB – Dare Ogunbowale 3-yard run (Jameis Winston run), 4:47. Panthers 37–26. **Drive: 11 plays, 75 yards, 3:09.**

**Top passers**

- CAR – Kyle Allen – 20/32, 227 yards, 2 TD
- TB – Jameis Winston – 30/54, 400 yards, TD, 5 INT

**Top rushers**

- CAR – Christian McCaffrey – 22 rushes, 31 yards, TD
- TB – Peyton Barber – 8 rushes, 28 yards

**Top receivers**

- CAR – D. J. Moore – 7 receptions, 73 yards
- TB – Chris Godwin – 10 receptions, 151 yards

The Panthers played in London for the first time as part of the NFL International Series. The Panthers get their fourth straight win, improving to 4–2.

==== Week 8: at San Francisco 49ers ====
Week Eight: Carolina Panthers at San Francisco 49ers – Game summary

Quarter	1	2	3	4	Total
Panthers	3	0	10	0	**13**
**49ers**	14	13	14	10	**51**

at Levi's Stadium, Santa Clara, California

- Date: October 27
- Game time: 4:05 p.m. EDT/1:05 p.m. PDT
- Game weather: Sunny, 66 °F (19 °C)
- Game attendance: 69,083
- Referee: Shawn Smith
- TV announcers (Fox): Dick Stockton, Mark Schlereth and Jennifer Hale
- Recap, Game Book

Game information

**First quarter**

- SF – Emmanuel Sanders 4-yard pass from Jimmy Garoppolo (Robbie Gould kick), 9:14. 49ers 7–0. **Drive: 11 plays, 75 yards, 5:46.**
- CAR – Joey Slye 41-yard field goal, 4:23. 49ers 7–3. **Drive: 6 plays, 18 yards, 2:36.**
- SF – Tevin Coleman 19-yard run (Robbie Gould kick), 1:09. 49ers 14–3. **Drive: 6 plays, 75 yards, 3:14.**

**Second quarter**

- SF – Tevin Coleman 10-yard pass from Jimmy Garoppolo (Robbie Gould kick), 12:43. 49ers 21–3. **Drive: 3 plays, 27 yards, 1:03.**
- SF – Tevin Coleman 48-yard run (pass failed), 1:53. 49ers 27–3. **Drive: 4 plays, 63 yards, 1:55.**

**Third quarter**

- CAR – Bruce Irvin sacks Jimmy Garoppolo in endzone for a safety, 12:43. 49ers 27–5.
- CAR – Christian McCaffrey 40-yard run (Christian McCaffrey run), 11:15. 49ers 27–13. **Drive: 3 plays, 51 yards, 1:28.**
- SF – Deebo Samuel 20-yard run (Robbie Gould kick), 7:15. 49ers 34–13. **Drive: 8 plays, 75 yards, 4:00.**
- SF – Tevin Coleman 1-yard run (Robbie Gould kick), 0:29. 49ers 41–13. **Drive: 3 plays, 10 yards, 1:21.**

**Fourth quarter**

- SF – Robbie Gould 20-yard field goal, 12:52. 49ers 44–13. **Drive: 4 plays, 7 yards, 2:08.**
- SF – Raheem Mostert 41-yard run (Robbie Gould kick), 6:16. 49ers 51–13. **Drive: 1 play, 41 yards, 0:08.**

**Top passers**

- CAR – Kyle Allen – 19/37, 153 yards, 3 INT
- SF – Jimmy Garoppolo – 18/22, 175 yards, 2 TD, INT

**Top rushers**

- CAR – Christian McCaffrey – 14 rushes, 117 yards, TD
- SF – Tevin Coleman – 11 rushes, 105 yards, 3 TD

**Top receivers**

- CAR – Curtis Samuel – 4 receptions, 46 yards
- SF – George Kittle – 6 receptions, 86 yards

The 49ers blow out the Panthers 51–13, and they fall to 4–3.

==== Week 9: vs. Tennessee Titans ====
Week Nine: Tennessee Titans at Carolina Panthers – Game summary

Quarter	1	2	3	4	Total
Titans	0	0	7	13	**20**
**Panthers**	0	17	7	6	**30**

at Bank of America Stadium, Charlotte, North Carolina

- Date: November 3
- Game time: 1:00 p.m. EST
- Game weather: Sunny, 58 °F (14 °C)
- Game attendance: 72,540
- Referee: Ronald Torbert
- TV announcers (CBS): Greg Gumbel, Trent Green and Melanie Collins
- Recap, Game Book

Game information

**First quarter**

- No scoring plays.

**Second quarter**

- CAR – Joey Slye 35-yard field goal, 13:28. Panthers 3–0. **Drive: 11 plays, 51 yards, 5:21.**
- CAR – Christian McCaffrey 7-yard pass from Kyle Allen (Joey Slye kick), 8:07. Panthers 10–0. **Drive: 4 plays, 15 yards, 1:42.**
- CAR – Curtis Samuel 12-yard pass from Kyle Allen (Joey Slye kick), 0:58. Panthers 17–0. **Drive: 12 plays, 90 yards, 6:06.**

**Third quarter**

- TEN – Derrick Henry 8-yard run (Ryan Succop kick), 10:11. Panthers 17–7. **Drive: 8 plays, 67 yards, 4:49.**
- CAR – Christian McCaffrey 1-yard run (Joey Slye kick), 5:16. Panthers 24–7. **Drive: 9 plays, 70 yards, 4:55.**

**Fourth quarter**

- TEN – Derrick Henry 23-yard pass from Ryan Tannehill (Ryan Succop kick), 14:14. Panthers 24–14. **Drive: 8 plays, 94 yards, 3:06.**
- CAR – Christian McCaffrey 58-yard run (kick blocked), 10:23. Panthers 30–14. **Drive: 6 plays, 83 yards, 3:51.**
- TEN – Ryan Tannehill 10-yard run (pass failed), 2:49. Panthers 30–20. **Drive: 10 plays, 61 yards, 3:12.**

**Top passers**

- TEN – Ryan Tannehill – 27/39, 331 yards, TD, 2 INT
- CAR – Kyle Allen – 17/32, 232 yards, 2 TD, INT

**Top rushers**

- TEN – Derrick Henry – 13 rushes, 63 yards, TD
- CAR – Christian McCaffrey – 24 rushes, 146 yards, 2 TD

**Top receivers**

- TEN – A. J. Brown – 4 receptions, 81 yards
- CAR – D. J. Moore – 7 receptions, 101 yards

==== Week 10: at Green Bay Packers ====
Week Ten: Carolina Panthers at Green Bay Packers – Game summary

Quarter	1	2	3	4	Total
Panthers	7	3	0	6	**16**
**Packers**	7	7	10	0	**24**

at Lambeau Field, Green Bay, Wisconsin

- Date: November 10
- Game time: 4:25 p.m. EST/3:25 p.m. CST
- Game weather: Cloudy, 32 °F (0 °C)
- Game attendance: 78,090
- Referee: Jerome Boger
- TV announcers (Fox): Joe Buck, Troy Aikman and Erin Andrews
- Recap, Game Book

Game information

**First quarter**

- CAR – Curtis Samuel 2-yard pass from Kyle Allen (Joey Slye kick), 7:18. Panthers 7–0. **Drive: 5 plays, 53 yards, 2:34.**
- GB – Aaron Jones 5-yard run (Mason Crosby kick), 3:35. Tied 7–7. **Drive: 7 plays, 75 yards, 3:43.**

**Second quarter**

- CAR – Joey Slye 50-yard field goal, 14:55. Panthers 10–7. **Drive: 8 plays, 43 yards, 3:40.**
- GB – Aaron Jones 1-yard run (Mason Crosby kick), 9:20. Packers 14–10. **Drive: 6 plays, 52 yards, 3:20.**

**Third quarter**

- GB – Aaron Jones 13-yard run (Mason Crosby kick), 11:50. Packers 21–10. **Drive: 5 plays, 75 yards, 3:10.**
- GB – Mason Crosby 47-yard field goal, 1:21. Packers 24–10. **Drive: 11 plays, 51 yards, 5:49.**

**Fourth quarter**

- CAR – Christian McCaffrey 3-yard run (pass failed), 11:58. Packers 24–16. **Drive: 10 plays, 82 yards, 4:23.**

**Top passers**

- CAR – Kyle Allen – 28/43, 307 yards, TD, INT
- GB – Aaron Rodgers – 17/29, 233 yards

**Top rushers**

- CAR – Christian McCaffrey – 20 rushes, 108 yards, TD
- GB – Aaron Jones – 13 rushes, 93 yards, 3 TD

**Top receivers**

- CAR – D. J. Moore – 9 receptions, 120 yards
- GB – Davante Adams – 7 receptions, 118 yards

==== Week 11: vs. Atlanta Falcons ====
Week Eleven: Atlanta Falcons at Carolina Panthers – Game summary

Quarter	1	2	3	4	Total
**Falcons**	10	10	6	3	**29**
Panthers	0	0	0	3	**3**

at Bank of America Stadium, Charlotte, North Carolina

- Date: November 17
- Game time: 1:00 p.m. EST
- Game weather: Partly cloudy, 51 °F (11 °C)
- Game attendance: 73,106
- Referee: Adrian Hill
- TV announcers (Fox): Dick Stockton, Mark Schlereth and Jennifer Hale
- Recap, Game Book

Game information

**First quarter**

- ATL – Younghoe Koo 38-yard field goal, 11:39. Falcons 3–0. **Drive: 8 plays, 55 yards, 3:21.**
- ATL – Kenjon Barner 78-yard punt return (Younghoe Koo kick), 0:59. Falcons 10–0.

**Second quarter**

- ATL – Younghoe Koo 23-yard field goal, 5:42. Falcons 13–0. **Drive: 10 plays, 75 yards, 5:00.**
- ATL – Qadree Ollison 2-yard run (Younghoe Koo kick), 1:34. Falcons 20–0. **Drive: 7 plays, 71 yards, 1:23.**

**Third quarter**

- ATL – Calvin Ridley 6-yard pass from Matt Ryan (pass failed), 6:40. Falcons 26–0. **Drive: 10 plays, 53 yards, 4:52.**

**Fourth quarter**

- CAR – Joey Slye 31-yard field goal, 13:00. Falcons 26–3. **Drive: 12 plays, 78 yards, 4:49.**
- ATL – Younghoe Koo 29-yard field goal, 7:01. Falcons 29–3. **Drive: 12 plays, 64 yards, 5:59.**

**Top passers**

- ATL – Matt Ryan – 21/31, 311 yards, TD
- CAR – Kyle Allen – 31/50, 325 yards, 4 INT

**Top rushers**

- ATL – Brian Hill – 15 rushes, 30 yards
- CAR – Christian McCaffrey – 14 rushes, 70 yards

**Top receivers**

- ATL – Calvin Ridley – 8 receptions, 143 yards, TD
- CAR – Christian McCaffrey – 11 receptions, 121 yards

==== Week 12: at New Orleans Saints ====
Week Twelve: Carolina Panthers at New Orleans Saints – Game summary

Quarter	1	2	3	4	Total
Panthers	6	9	9	7	**31**
**Saints**	14	3	14	3	**34**

at Mercedes-Benz Superdome, New Orleans, Louisiana

- Date: November 24
- Game time: 1:00 p.m. EST/12:00 p.m. CST
- Game weather: None (indoor stadium)
- Game attendance: 73,068
- Referee: Alex Kemp
- TV announcers (CBS): Jim Nantz, Tony Romo and Tracy Wolfson
- Recap, Game Book

Game information

**First quarter**

- NO – Latavius Murray 26-yard run (Wil Lutz kick), 10:39. Saints 7–0. **Drive: 7 plays, 75 yards, 4:21.**
- NO – Tre'Quan Smith 13-yard pass from Drew Brees (Wil Lutz kick), 5:12. Saints 14–0. **Drive: 4 plays, 27 yards, 1:30.**
- CAR – D. J. Moore 51-yard pass from Kyle Allen (kick failed, wide right), 3:08. Saints 14–6. **Drive: 4 plays, 75 yards, 2:04.**

**Second quarter**

- NO – Wil Lutz 41-yard field goal, 13:34. Saints 17–6. **Drive: 9 plays, 52 yards, 4:34.**
- CAR – Joey Slye 41-yard field goal, 8:09. Saints 17–9. **Drive: 10 plays, 52 yards, 5:25.**
- CAR – Christian McCaffrey 1-yard pass from Kyle Allen (pass failed), 0:00. Saints 17–15. **Drive: 17 plays, 68 yards, 6:30.**

**Third quarter**

- NO – Jared Cook 20-yard pass from Drew Brees (Wil Lutz kick), 11:18. Saints 24–15. **Drive: 5 plays, 62 yards, 2:40.**
- CAR – Joey Slye 52-yard field goal, 8:36. Saints 24–18. **Drive: 8 plays, 41 yards, 2:42.**
- NO – Michael Thomas 3-yard pass from Drew Brees (Wil Lutz kick), 5:09. Saints 31–18. **Drive: 6 plays, 75 yards, 3:27.**
- CAR – Christian McCaffrey 4-yard run (kick failed, wide right), 1:28. Saints 31–24. **Drive: 7 plays, 71 yards, 3:41.**

**Fourth quarter**

- CAR – D. J. Moore 2-yard pass from Kyle Allen (Joey Slye kick), 9:23. Tied 31–31. **Drive: 6 plays, 50 yards, 3:03.**
- NO – Wil Lutz 33-yard field goal, 0:00. Saints 34–31. **Drive: 11 plays, 65 yards, 1:56.**

**Top passers**

- CAR – Kyle Allen – 23/36, 256 yards, 3 TD
- NO – Drew Brees – 30/39, 311 yards, 3 TD, INT

**Top rushers**

- CAR – Christian McCaffrey – 22 rushes, 64 yards, TD
- NO – Latavius Murray – 7 rushes, 64 yards, TD

**Top receivers**

- CAR – D. J. Moore – 6 receptions, 126 yards, 2 TD
- NO – Michael Thomas – 11 receptions, 101 yards, TD

==== Week 13: vs. Washington Redskins ====
Week Thirteen: Washington Redskins at Carolina Panthers – Game summary

Quarter	1	2	3	4	Total
**Redskins**	3	9	3	14	**29**
Panthers	14	0	0	7	**21**

at Bank of America Stadium, Charlotte, North Carolina

- Date: December 1
- Game time: 1:00 p.m. EST
- Game weather: Cloudy, 64 °F (18 °C)
- Game attendance: 71,504
- Referee: Scott Novak
- TV announcers (CBS): Greg Gumbel, Trent Green and Melanie Collins
- Recap, Game Book

Game information

**First quarter**

- CAR – Curtis Samuel 4-yard pass from Kyle Allen (Joey Slye kick), 10:39. Panthers 7–0. **Drive: 8 plays, 75 yards, 4:21.**
- CAR – D. J. Moore 13-yard pass from Kyle Allen (Joey Slye kick), 5:18. Panthers 14–0. **Drive: 6 plays, 55 yards, 3:09.**
- WAS – Dustin Hopkins 25-yard field goal, 3:09. Panthers 14–3. **Drive: 6 plays, 68 yards, 2:09.**

**Second quarter**

- WAS – Dustin Hopkins 42-yard field goal, 11:16. Panthers 14–6. **Drive: 9 plays, 41 yards, 3:35.**
- WAS – Derrius Guice 1-yard run (pass failed), 4:33. Panthers 14–12. **Drive: 1 play, 1 yard, 0:03.**

**Third quarter**

- WAS – Dustin Hopkins 36-yard field goal, 8:33. Redskins 15–14. **Drive: 11 plays, 57 yards, 6:27.**

**Fourth quarter**

- WAS – Derrius Guice 1-yard run (Dustin Hopkins kick), 9:09. Redskins 22–14. **Drive: 7 plays, 67 yards, 3:42.**
- WAS – Adrian Peterson 12-yard run (Dustin Hopkins kick), 4:26. Redskins 29–14. **Drive: 5 plays, 55 yards, 3:04.**
- CAR – Kyle Allen 17-yard run (Joey Slye kick), 1:51. Redskins 29–21. **Drive: 12 plays, 75 yards, 2:35.**

**Top passers**

- WAS – Dwayne Haskins – 13/25, 147 yards
- CAR – Kyle Allen – 27/46, 278 yards, 2 TD, INT

**Top rushers**

- WAS – Derrius Guice – 10 rushes, 129 yards, 2 TD
- CAR – Christian McCaffrey – 14 rushes, 44 yards

**Top receivers**

- WAS – Kelvin Harmon – 3 receptions, 51 yards
- CAR – D. J. Moore – 6 receptions, 75 yards, TD

==== Week 14: at Atlanta Falcons ====
Week Fourteen: Carolina Panthers at Atlanta Falcons – Game summary

Quarter	1	2	3	4	Total
Panthers	0	10	0	10	**20**
**Falcons**	3	10	17	10	**40**

at Mercedes-Benz Stadium, Atlanta, Georgia

- Date: December 8
- Game time: 1:00 p.m. EST
- Game weather: TBD (retractable roof stadium)
- Game attendance: 70,592
- Referee: Clete Blakeman
- TV announcers (Fox): Chris Myers, Daryl Johnston and Laura Okmin
- Recap, Game Book

Game information

**First quarter**

- ATL – Younghoe Koo 37-yard field goal, 2:47. Falcons 3–0. **Drive: 13 plays, 55 yards, 6:24.**

**Second quarter**

- CAR – Joey Slye 46-yard field goal, 14:51. Tied 3–3. **Drive: 9 plays, 47 yards, 2:56.**
- ATL – Calvin Ridley 15-yard pass from Matt Ryan (Younghoe Koo kick), 5:15. Falcons 10–3. **Drive: 6 plays, 74 yards, 2:03.**
- CAR – Ian Thomas 1-yard pass from Kyle Allen (Joey Slye kick), 1:05. Tied 10–10. **Drive: 9 plays, 87 yards, 1:28.**
- ATL – Younghoe Koo 35-yard field goal, 0:00. Falcons 13–10. **Drive: 6 plays, 58 yards, 1:05.**

**Third quarter**

- ATL – Devonta Freeman 13-yard run (Younghoe Koo kick), 11:08. Falcons 20–10. **Drive: 5 plays, 46 yards, 2:35.**
- ATL – Olamide Zaccheaus 93-yard pass from Matt Ryan (Younghoe Koo kick), 6:30. Falcons 27–10. **Drive: 3 plays, 95 yards, 1:03.**
- ATL – Younghoe Koo 29-yard field goal, 4:55. Falcons 30–10. **Drive: 4 plays, 5 yards, 1:27.**

**Fourth quarter**

- ATL – Younghoe Koo 50-yard field goal, 11:40. Falcons 33–10. **Drive: 7 plays, 17 yards, 3:20.**
- CAR – Joey Slye 42-yard field goal, 7:54. Falcons 33–13. **Drive: 7 plays, 51 yards, 3:46.**
- ATL – Brian Hill 3-yard run (Younghoe Koo kick), 5:08. Falcons 40–13. **Drive: 6 plays, 42 yards, 2:46.**
- CAR – Kyle Allen 1-yard run (Joey Slye kick), 1:26. Falcons 40–20. **Drive: 13 plays, 75 yards, 3:42.**

**Top passers**

- CAR – Kyle Allen – 28/41, 293 yards, TD, 2 INT
- ATL – Matt Ryan – 20/34, 313 yards, 2 TD

**Top rushers**

- CAR – Christian McCaffrey – 11 rushes, 53 yards
- ATL – Devonta Freeman – 17 rushes, 84 yards, TD

**Top receivers**

- CAR – Christian McCaffrey – 11 receptions, 82 yards
- ATL – Olamide Zaccheaus – 1 reception, 93 yards, TD

==== Week 15: vs. Seattle Seahawks ====
Week Fifteen: Seattle Seahawks at Carolina Panthers – Game summary

Quarter	1	2	3	4	Total
**Seahawks**	13	7	3	7	**30**
Panthers	0	7	3	14	**24**

at Bank of America Stadium, Charlotte, North Carolina

- Date: December 15
- Game time: 1:00 p.m. EST
- Game weather: Sunny, 56 °F (13 °C)
- Game attendance: 72,544
- Referee: Carl Cheffers
- TV announcers (Fox): Kenny Albert, Ronde Barber and Lindsay Czarniak
- Recap, Game Book

Game information

**First quarter**

- SEA – Chris Carson 16-yard run (kick failed, hit right upright), 10:26. Seahawks 6–0. **Drive: 8 plays, 75 yards, 4:34.**
- SEA – DK Metcalf 19-yard pass from Russell Wilson (Jason Myers kick), 5:22. Seahawks 13–0. **Drive: 8 plays, 80 yards, 4:20.**

**Second quarter**

- CAR – Christian McCaffrey 1-yard run (Joey Slye kick), 13:43. Seahawks 13–7. **Drive: 12 plays, 75 yards, 6:39.**
- SEA – Tyler Lockett 19-yard pass from Russell Wilson (Jason Myers kick), 10:09. Seahawks 20–7. **Drive: 6 plays, 75 yards, 3:34.**

**Third quarter**

- CAR – Joey Slye 52-yard field goal, 11:35. Seahawks 20–10. **Drive: 9 plays, 41 yards, 3:25.**
- SEA – Jason Myers 30-yard field goal, 0:28. Seahawks 23–10. **Drive: 4 plays, 9 yards, 2:27.**

**Fourth quarter**

- SEA – Chris Carson 6-yard run (Jason Myers kick), 7:18. Seahawks 30–10. **Drive: 11 plays, 82 yards, 6:22.**
- CAR – Christian McCaffrey 15-yard run (Joey Slye kick), 4:53. Seahawks 30–17. **Drive: 9 plays, 75 yards, 2:25.**
- CAR – Curtis Samuel 5-yard pass from Kyle Allen (Joey Slye kick), 3:14. Seahawks 30–24. **Drive: 7 plays, 84 yards, 1:11.**

**Top passers**

- SEA – Russell Wilson – 20/26, 286 yards, 2 TD
- CAR – Kyle Allen – 25/41, 277 yards, TD, 3 INT

**Top rushers**

- SEA – Chris Carson – 24 rushes, 133 yards, 2 TD
- CAR – Christian McCaffrey – 19 rushes, 87 yards, 2 TD

**Top receivers**

- SEA – Tyler Lockett – 8 receptions, 120 yards, TD
- CAR – D. J. Moore – 8 receptions, 113 yards

==== Week 16: at Indianapolis Colts ====
Week Sixteen: Carolina Panthers at Indianapolis Colts – Game summary

Quarter	1	2	3	4	Total
Panthers	0	3	3	0	**6**
**Colts**	14	7	3	14	**38**

at Lucas Oil Stadium, Indianapolis, Indiana

- Date: December 22
- Game time: 1:00 p.m. EST
- Game weather: None (retractable roof closed)
- Game attendance: 61,845
- Referee: Walt Anderson
- TV announcers (Fox): Dick Stockton, Mark Schlereth and Jennifer Hale
- Recap, Game Book

Game information

**First quarter**

- IND - Jacoby Brissett 1-yard run (Chase McLaughlin kick), 9:28. Colts 7-0. **Drive: 8 plays, 36 yards, 4:19.**
- IND - Nyheim Hines 84-yard punt return (Chase McLaughlin kick), 7:41. Colts 14-0.

**Second quarter**

- CAR - Joey Slye 27-yard field goal, 10:18. Colts 14-3. **Drive: 12 plays, 61 yards, 5:12.**
- IND - Marlon Mack 2-yard run (Chase McLaughlin kick), 5:14. Colts 21-3. **Drive: 9 plays, 75 yards, 5:04.**

**Third quarter**

- IND - Chase McLaughlin 35-yard field goal, 10:59. Colts 24-3. **Drive: 10 plays, 58 yards, 4:01.**
- CAR - Joey Slye 50-yard field goal, 4:16. Colts 24-6. **Drive: 12 plays, 43 yards, 6:43.**

**Fourth quarter**

- IND - Nyheim Hines 71-yard punt return (Chase McLaughlin kick), 7:16. Colts 31-6.
- IND - Jordan Wilkins 1-yard run (Chase McLaughlin kick), 3:10. Colts 38-6. **Drive: 8 plays, 76 yards, 3:34.**

**Top passers**

- CAR - Will Grier - 27/44, 224 yards, 3 INT
- IND - Jacoby Brissett - 14/27, 119 yards

**Top rushers**

- CAR - Christian McCaffrey - 13 rushes, 54 yards
- IND - Marlon Mack - 16 rushes, 95 yards, TD

**Top receivers**

- CAR - Christian McCaffrey - 15 receptions, 119 yards
- IND - T. Y. Hilton - 3 receptions, 26 yards

==== Week 17: vs. New Orleans Saints ====
Week Seventeen: New Orleans Saints at Carolina Panthers – Game summary

Quarter	1	2	3	4	Total
**Saints**	14	21	7	0	**42**
Panthers	0	3	7	0	**10**

at Bank of America Stadium, Charlotte, North Carolina

- Date: December 29
- Game time: 1:00 p.m. EST
- Game weather: Cloudy, 63 °F (17 °C)
- Game attendance: 72,203
- Referee: Ronald Torbert
- TV announcers (Fox): Kenny Albert, Ronde Barber and Lindsay Czarniak
- Recap, Game Book

Game information

**First quarter**

- NO – Alvin Kamara 15-yard run (Wil Lutz kick), 10:54. Saints 7-0. **Drive: 8 plays, 75 yards, 4:12.**
- NO – Alvin Kamara 1-yard run (Wil Lutz kick), 1:05. Saints 14-0. **Drive: 11 plays, 57 yards, 6:21.**

**Second quarter**

- NO – A. J. Klein 14-yard interception return (Wil Lutz Kick), 12:10. Saints 21-0.
- NO – Tre'Quan Smith 1-yard pass from Drew Brees (Wil Lutz kick), 6:32. Saints 28-0. **Drive: 9 plays, 50 yards, 4:29**
- NO – Jared Cook 21-yard pass from Drew Brees (Wil Lutz kick), 2:17. Saints 35-0. **Drive: 4 plays, 74 yards, 1:56.**
- CAR – Joey Slye 23-yard field goal, 0:36. Saints 35-3. **Drive: 11 plays, 70 yards, 1:39.**

**Third quarter**

- NO – Taysom Hill 45 yard pass from Drew Brees (Wil Lutz kick), 4:36. Saints 42-3. **Drive: 8 plays, 75 yards, 3:52.**
- CAR – Christian McCaffrey 1-yard run (Joey Slye kick), 0:37. Saints 42-10. **Drive: 9 plays, 75 yards, 3:52.**

**Fourth quarter**

- No scoring plays.

**Top passers**

- CAR – Kyle Allen - 25/41, 295 yards, INT
- NO – Drew Brees - 19/30, 253 yards, 3 TD

**Top rushers**

- CAR – Christian McCaffrey - 9 rushes, 26 yards
- NO – Latavius Murray - 17 rushes, 61 yards

**Top receivers**

- CAR – Brandon Zylstra - 6 receptions, 96 yards
- NO – Tre'Quan Smith - 5 receptions, 56 yards, TD

=== Standings ===
==== Division ====
NFC South
	W	L	T	PCT	DIV	CONF	PF	PA	STK
^{(3)} New Orleans Saints	13	3	0	.813	5–1	9–3	458	341	W3
Atlanta Falcons	7	9	0	.438	4–2	6–6	381	399	W4
Tampa Bay Buccaneers	7	9	0	.438	2–4	5–7	458	449	L2
Carolina Panthers	5	11	0	.313	1–5	2–10	340	470	L8

==== Conference ====
NFC
#	Team	Division	W	L	T	PCT	DIV	CONF	SOS	SOV	STK
**Division leaders**
1 (Note: San Francisco finished ahead of Green Bay and New Orleans based on head-to-head sweep, claiming the No. 1 seed.)	San Francisco 49ers	West	13	3	0	.813	5–1	10–2	.504	.466	W2
2 (Note: Green Bay claimed the No. 2 seed over New Orleans based on conference record.)	Green Bay Packers	North	13	3	0	.813	6–0	10–2	.453	.428	W5
3	New Orleans Saints	South	13	3	0	.813	5–1	9–3	.486	.459	W3
4	Philadelphia Eagles	East	9	7	0	.563	5–1	7–5	.455	.417	W4
**Wild Cards**
5	Seattle Seahawks	West	11	5	0	.688	3–3	8–4	.531	.463	L2
6	Minnesota Vikings	North	10	6	0	.625	2–4	7–5	.477	.356	L2
**Did not qualify for the postseason**
7	Los Angeles Rams	West	9	7	0	.563	3–3	7–5	.535	.438	W1
8 (Note: Chicago finished ahead of Dallas based on head-to-head victory.)	Chicago Bears	North	8	8	0	.500	4–2	7–5	.508	.383	W1
9	Dallas Cowboys	East	8	8	0	.500	5–1	7–5	.479	.316	W1
10 (Note: Atlanta finished ahead of Tampa Bay based on division record.)	Atlanta Falcons	South	7	9	0	.438	4–2	6–6	.545	.518	W4
11	Tampa Bay Buccaneers	South	7	9	0	.438	2–4	5–7	.500	.384	L2
12	Arizona Cardinals	West	5	10	1	.344	1–5	3–8–1	.529	.375	L1
13	Carolina Panthers	South	5	11	0	.313	1–5	2–10	.549	.469	L8
14	New York Giants	East	4	12	0	.250	2–4	3–9	.473	.281	L1
15	Detroit Lions	North	3	12	1	.219	0–6	2–9–1	.506	.375	L9
16	Washington Redskins	East	3	13	0	.188	0–6	2–10	.502	.281	L4
**Tiebreakers** (Note: When breaking ties for three or more teams under the NFL's rules, they are first broken within divisions, then comparing only the highest-ranked remaining team from each division.)
