= 2018 Carolina Panthers season =

24th season in franchise history, first under ownership of David Tepper

- Owner: David Tepper
- General manager: Marty Hurney
- Head coach: Ron Rivera
- Home stadium: Bank of America Stadium

Results
- Record: 7–9
- Division place: 3rd NFC South
- Playoffs: Did not qualify
- Pro Bowlers: MLB Luke Kuechly; G Trai Turner; DT Kawann Short
- Team MVP: Christian McCaffrey
- Team ROY: D. J. Moore

Uniform
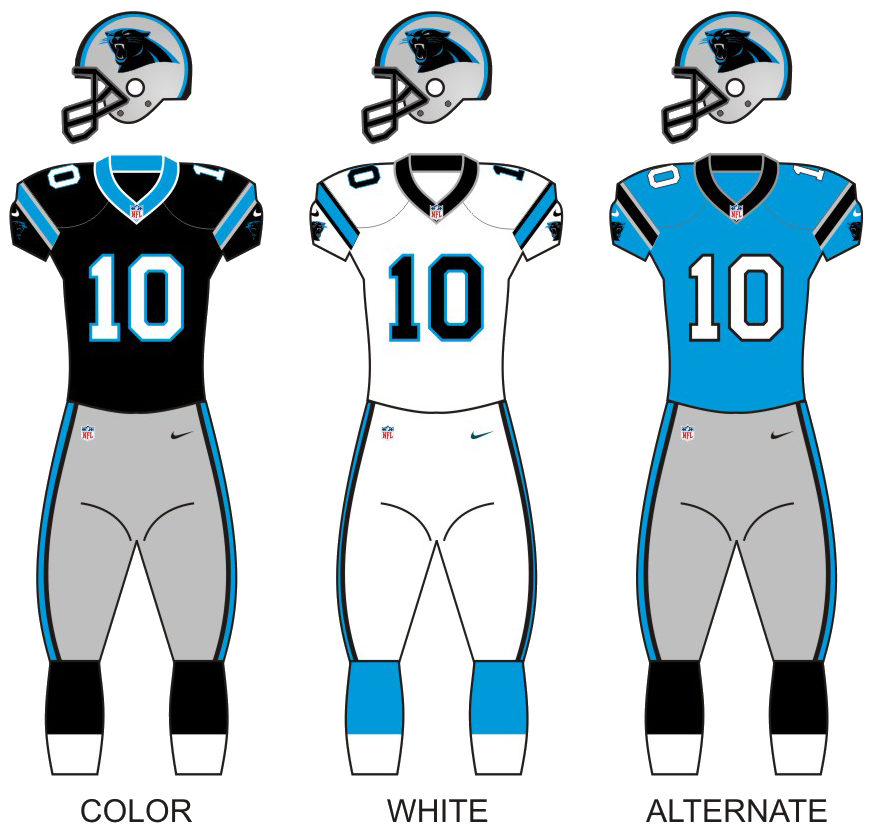

The 2018 season was the Carolina Panthers' 24th in the National Football League (NFL) and their eighth under head coach Ron Rivera. It was the team's first season without former assistant head coach/defensive coordinator Steve Wilks, who became head coach of the Arizona Cardinals in the offseason and former offensive coordinator Mike Shula, who became the quarterbacks coach and offensive coordinator of the New York Giants.

The Panthers entered the season hoping to improve or match their 11–5 record from last year. After starting 6–2, the Panthers suffered a late-season collapse, going on a 7-game losing streak, failing to improve or match their previous season's record, and were eliminated from playoff contention following a loss to the Atlanta Falcons in Week 16. Although they went a dismal 1–7 in the second half of the season, the Panthers managed to end on a high note by defeating their division rival New Orleans Saints, 33–14. From 2018 onwards, the Panthers finished each season with a losing record, and entered an 8 year playoff drought that lasted until the 2025 season.

== Draft ==
2018 Carolina Panthers Draft
Round	Selection	Player	Position	College	Notes
1	24	D. J. Moore	WR	Maryland	
2	55	Donte Jackson	CB	LSU	
3	85	Rashaan Gaulden	CB	Tennessee	From Buffalo
4	101	Ian Thomas	TE	Indiana	From Green Bay
4	136	Marquis Haynes	DE	Ole Miss	
5	161	Jermaine Carter	LB	Maryland	
7	234	Andre Smith	LB	North Carolina	From L.A. Chargers via Buffalo
7	242	Kendrick Norton	DT	Miami	

Draft trades

- The Panthers traded wide receiver Kelvin Benjamin to Buffalo in exchange for Buffalo's third-round selection (85th overall) and the seventh-round selection they acquired from the LA Chargers (234th overall).
- The Panthers traded their fourth-round selection (123rd overall) and punter Kasey Redfern to Cleveland in exchange for Cleveland's seventh-round selection in 2017 and punter Andy Lee.

== Staff ==
2018 Carolina Panthers staff
Front office: Owner – David Tepper; President – Tom Glick; General manager – Marty Hurney; Director of football operations – Bryan Porter; Assistant director of football operations – Mike Anderson; Director of team administration – Rob Rogers; Director of pro scouting – Matt Allen; Senior director of college scouting – Jeff Morrow; Regional director of college scouting – Mike Szabo; Regional director of college scouting – Eric Stokes; Senior advisor to the general manager – Mark Carrier; Executive assistant to the head coach – Linda O'Hora; Head coaches: Head coach – Ron Rivera; Offensive coaches: Offensive coordinator – Norv Turner; Quarterbacks – Scott Turner; Running backs – Jim Skipper; Wide receivers – Lance Taylor; Assistant wide receivers – Jerricho Cotchery; Tight ends – Pete Hoener; Run game coordinator – John Matsko; Assistant offensive line – Travelle Wharton; Offensive quality control – Drew Terrell	Defensive coaches: Defensive coordinator – Eric Washington; Defensive line – Brady Hoke; Assistant defensive line – Sam Mills III; Linebackers – Steve Russ; Secondary – Richard Rodgers; Assistant defensive backs/nickels – Jeff Imamura; Defensive quality control – Vincent Rivera; Special teams coaches: Special teams coordinator – Chase Blackburn; Assistant special teams – Heath Farwell; Strength and conditioning: Strength and conditioning – Joe Kenn; Assistant strength and conditioning – Jason Benguche

== Final roster ==
2018 Carolina Panthers roster
Quarterbacks (QB): 7 Kyle Allen; 3 Garrett Gilbert; 1 Cam Newton; Running backs (RB): 40 Alex Armah FB; 34 Cameron Artis-Payne; 38 Travaris Cadet; 22 Christian McCaffrey; Wide receivers (WR): 14 Mose Frazier; 17 Devin Funchess; 12 D. J. Moore; 10 Curtis Samuel; 11 Torrey Smith; 13 Jarius Wright; Tight ends (TE): 82 Chris Manhertz; 80 Ian Thomas; 84 Jason Vander Laan	Offensive linemen (OL): 74 Chris Clark T; 62 Taylor Hearn G; 64 Dorian Johnson G; 67 Ryan Kalil C; 69 Tyler Larsen G; 72 Taylor Moton T; 71 Marshall Newhouse T/G; 70 Trai Turner G; 73 Greg Van Roten G; Defensive linemen (DL): 97 Mario Addison DE; 92 Vernon Butler DT; 91 Bryan Cox Jr. DE; 96 Wes Horton DE; 93 Kyle Love DT; 94 Efe Obada DE; 90 Julius Peppers DE; 95 Dontari Poe DT; 99 Kawann Short DT	Linebackers (LB): 56 Jermaine Carter OLB; 58 Thomas Davis OLB; 98 Marquis Haynes OLB; 53 Ben Jacobs OLB; 59 Luke Kuechly MLB; 55 David Mayo OLB; 57 Andre Smith MLB; Defensive backs (DB): 29 Mike Adams FS; 24 James Bradberry CB; 31 Lorenzo Doss CB; 35 Corn Elder CB; 28 Rashaan Gaulden FS; 26 Donte Jackson CB; 42 Colin Jones SS; 41 Captain Munnerlyn CB; 25 Eric Reid SS; Special teams (ST): 4 Chandler Catanzaro K; 44 J. J. Jansen LS; 5 Michael Palardy P	Practice squad: 39 Reggie Bonnafon RB; 50 Brandon Chubb OLB; 32 Cole Luke CB; 36 Kai Nacua SS; 76 Elijah Qualls DT; 68 Ian Silberman G; 78 Landon Turner G; 16 DeAndrew White WR; 49 Antwione Williams OLB; Reserve: 23 Kenjon Barner RB (IR); 18 Damiere Byrd WR (IR); 47 Ross Cockrell CB (IR); 9 Graham Gano K (IR); 6 Taylor Heinicke QB (IR); 30 Elijah Hood RB (IR); 75 Matt Kalil T (IR); 63 Brendan Mahon G (IR); 52 Jared Norris OLB (IR); 88 Greg Olsen TE (IR); 45 Damian Parms SS (IR); 21 Da'Norris Searcy SS (IR); 27 Kevon Seymour CB (IR); 65 Amini Silatolu G (IR); 54 Shaq Thompson OLB (IR); 43 Fozzy Whittaker RB (IR); 60 Daryl Williams T (IR); Rookies in italics 53 active, 17 reserve, 9 practice squad

== Preseason ==
Week	Date	Opponent	Result	Record	Venue	Recap
1	August 9	at Buffalo Bills	W 28–23	1–0	New Era Field	Recap
2	August 17	Miami Dolphins	W 27–20	2–0	Bank of America Stadium	Recap
3	August 24	New England Patriots	W 25–14	3–0	Bank of America Stadium	Recap
4	August 30	at Pittsburgh Steelers	L 24–39	3–1	Heinz Field	Recap

== Regular season ==
=== Schedule ===
Week	Date	Opponent	Result	Record	Venue	Recap
1	September 9	Dallas Cowboys	**W** 16–8	1–0	Bank of America Stadium	Recap
2	September 16	at **Atlanta Falcons**	**L** 24–31	1–1	Mercedes-Benz Stadium	Recap
3	September 23	Cincinnati Bengals	**W** 31–21	2–1	Bank of America Stadium	Recap
4	Bye					
5	October 7	New York Giants	**W** 33–31	3–1	Bank of America Stadium	Recap
6	October 14	at Washington Redskins	**L** 17–23	3–2	FedEx Field	Recap
7	October 21	at Philadelphia Eagles	**W** 21–17	4–2	Lincoln Financial Field	Recap
8	October 28	Baltimore Ravens	**W** 36–21	5–2	Bank of America Stadium	Recap
9	November 4	**Tampa Bay Buccaneers**	**W** 42–28	6–2	Bank of America Stadium	Recap
10	November 8	at Pittsburgh Steelers	**L** 21–52	6–3	Heinz Field	Recap
11	November 18	at Detroit Lions	**L** 19–20	6–4	Ford Field	Recap
12	November 25	Seattle Seahawks	**L** 27–30	6–5	Bank of America Stadium	Recap
13	December 2	at **Tampa Bay Buccaneers**	**L** 17–24	6–6	Raymond James Stadium	Recap
14	December 9	at Cleveland Browns	**L** 20–26	6–7	First Energy Stadium	Recap
15	December 17	**New Orleans Saints**	**L** 9–12	6–8	Bank of America Stadium	Recap
16	December 23	**Atlanta Falcons**	**L** 10–24	6–9	Bank of America Stadium	Recap
17	December 30	at **New Orleans Saints**	**W** 33–14	7–9	Mercedes-Benz Superdome	Recap

Note: Intra-division opponents are in bold text.

=== Game summaries ===
==== Week 1: vs. Dallas Cowboys ====
Week One: Dallas Cowboys at Carolina Panthers – Game summary

Quarter	1	2	3	4	Total
Cowboys	0	0	0	8	**8**
**Panthers**	0	10	0	6	**16**

at Bank of America Stadium, Charlotte, North Carolina

- Date: September 9
- Game time: 4:25 p.m. EDT
- Game weather: 81 °F (27 °C), Partly Cloudy
- Game attendance: 74,532
- Referee: Walt Anderson
- TV announcers (Fox): Joe Buck, Troy Aikman, Erin Andrews, and Mike Pereira
- Recap, Gamebook

Game information

**First quarter**

- No scoring plays

**Second quarter**

- CAR – Cam Newton 4-yard run (Graham Gano kick), 8:54. Panthers 7–0. **Drive: 7 plays, 35 yards, 3:28.**
- CAR – Graham Gano 27-yard field goal, 0:07. Panthers 10–0. **Drive: 11 plays, 53 yards, 2:41.**

**Third quarter**

- No scoring plays

**Fourth quarter**

- CAR – Alexander Armah 1-yard run (kick failed), 14:16. Panthers 16–0. **Drive: 6 plays, 63 yards, 3:25.**
- DAL – Ezekiel Elliott 4-yard run (Dak Prescott run), 8:58. Panthers 16–8. **Drive: 10 plays, 75 yards, 5:21.**

**Top passers**

- DAL – Dak Prescott – 19/29, 170 yards
- CAR – Cam Newton – 17/26, 161 yards

**Top rushers**

- DAL – Ezekiel Elliott – 15 rushes, 69 yards, TD
- CAR – Cam Newton – 13 rushes, 58 yards, TD

**Top receivers**

- DAL – Cole Beasley – 7 receptions, 73 yards
- CAR – Christian McCaffrey – 6 receptions, 45 yards

In the Panthers' home opener both teams were scoreless in the first quarter. In the second, Cam Newton rushed for a touchdown to score the game's first points. Graham Gano later kicked a field goal to further the Panthers' lead to 10–0. Both teams were again scoreless in the third quarter. Alexander Armah scored a touchdown in the fourth quarter, but the extra point attempt was no good when the ball slipped out of Michael Palardy's hands. The Cowboys later put points on the board with an Ezekiel Elliott touchdown run followed by a two-point conversion by quarterback Dak Prescott, decreasing the Panthers' lead to eight points. The Panthers managed to hold off the Cowboys by forcing a fumble off Prescott in the Cowboys' last offensive drive, winning 16–8.

Tight end Greg Olsen and offensive tackle Daryl Williams left the game early due to injuries.

==== Week 2: at Atlanta Falcons ====
Week Two: Carolina Panthers at Atlanta Falcons – Game summary

Quarter	1	2	3	4	Total
Panthers	3	7	0	14	**24**
**Falcons**	3	14	7	7	**31**

at Mercedes-Benz Stadium, Atlanta, Georgia

- Date: September 16
- Game time: 1:00 p.m. EDT
- Game weather: Played indoors (retractable roof closed)
- Game attendance: 72,528
- Referee: Bill Vinovich
- TV announcers (Fox): Dan Hellie, Greg Jennings, and Karyn Bryant
- Recap, Gamebook

Game information

**First quarter**

- CAR – Graham Gano 54-yard field goal, 11:36. Panthers 3–0. **Drive: 7 plays, 39 yards, 3:24.**
- ATL – Matt Bryant 44-yard field goal, 5:41. Tied 3–3. **Drive: 10 plays, 57 yards, 5:55.**

**Second quarter**

- CAR – Jarius Wright 5-yard pass from Cam Newton (Graham Gano kick), 8:42. Panthers 10–3. **Drive: 13 plays, 70 yards, 6:28.**
- ATL – Calvin Ridley 11-yard pass from Matt Ryan (Matt Bryant kick), 4:03. Tied 10–10. **Drive: 9 plays, 75 yards, 4:39.**
- ATL – Austin Hooper 8-yard pass from Matt Ryan (Matt Bryant kick), 0:22. Falcons 17–10. **Drive: 7 plays, 85 yards, 1:13.**

**Third quarter**

- ATL – Matt Ryan 1-yard run (Matt Bryant kick), 9:23. Falcons 24–10. **Drive: 7 plays, 58 yards, 3:26.**

**Fourth quarter**

- CAR – Torrey Smith 3-yard pass from Cam Newton (Graham Gano kick), 11:23. Falcons 24–17. **Drive: 11 plays, 80 yards, 5:21.**
- ATL – Matt Ryan 8-yard run (Matt Bryant kick), 7:17. Falcons 31–17. **Drive: 7 plays, 75 yards, 4:06.**
- CAR – D. J. Moore 51-yard pass from Cam Newton (Graham Gano kick), 2:20. Falcons 31–24. **Drive: 5 plays, 96 yards, 1:36.**

**Top passers**

- CAR – Cam Newton – 32/45, 335 yards, 3 TD, 1 INT
- ATL – Matt Ryan – 23/28, 272 yards, 2 TD, 1 INT

**Top rushers**

- CAR – Cam Newton – 5 carries, 42 yards
- ATL – Tevin Coleman – 16 carries, 107 yards

**Top receivers**

- CAR – Christian McCaffrey – 14 receptions, 102 yards
- ATL – Julio Jones – 5 receptions, 64 yards

The Falcons proved too much for the Panthers. With the 24–31 loss, the Panthers fell to 1–1.

==== Week 3: vs. Cincinnati Bengals ====
Week Three: Cincinnati Bengals at Carolina Panthers – Game summary

Quarter	1	2	3	4	Total
Bengals	7	7	7	0	**21**
**Panthers**	7	14	7	3	**31**

at Bank of America Stadium, Charlotte, North Carolina

- Date: September 23
- Game time: 1:00 p.m. EDT
- Game weather: 80 °F (27 °C), cloudy
- Game attendance: 72,161
- Referee: John Parry
- TV announcers (CBS): Kevin Harlan, Rich Gannon, and Steve Tasker
- Recap, Gamebook

Game information

**First quarter**

- CIN – Giovani Bernard 1-yard run (Randy Bullock kick), 7:40. Bengals 7–0. **Drive: 11 plays, 75 yards, 6:03.**
- CAR – Cam Newton 2-yard run (Graham Gano kick), 3:02. Tied 7–7. **Drive: 9 plays, 75 yards, 4:38.**

**Second quarter**

- CAR – Devin Funchess 4-yard pass from Cam Newton (Graham Gano kick), 12:03. Panthers 14–7. **Drive: 9 plays, 67 yards, 4:52.**
- CIN – C. J. Uzomah 1-yard pass from Andy Dalton (Randy Bullock kick), 6:59. Tied 14–14. **Drive: 12 plays, 75 yards, 5:04.**
- CAR – C. J. Anderson 24-yard pass from Cam Newton (Graham Gano kick), 2:47. Panthers 21–14. **Drive: 7 plays, 75 yards, 4:12.**

**Third quarter**

- CAR – Cam Newton 5-yard run (Graham Gano kick), 5:34. Panthers 28–14. **Drive: 6 plays, 26 yards, 3:53.**
- CIN – Tyler Boyd 27-yard pass from Andy Dalton (Randy Bullock kick), 2:53. Panthers 28–21. **Drive: 5 plays, 75 yards, 2:41.**

**Fourth quarter**

- CAR – Graham Gano 40-yard field goal, 1:11. Panthers 31–21. **Drive: 7 plays, 28 yards, 2:22.**

**Top passers**

- CIN – Andy Dalton – 29/46, 352 yards, 2 TD, 4 INT
- CAR – Cam Newton – 15/24, 150 yards, 2 TD

**Top rushers**

- CIN – Giovani Bernard – 12 carries, 61 yards, TD
- CAR – Christian McCaffrey – 28 carries, 184 yards

**Top receivers**

- CIN – Tyler Boyd – 6 receptions, 132 yards, TD
- CAR – Devin Funchess – 4 receptions, 67 yards, TD

The Bengals were the first to score in the game but the Panthers answered back with a Cam Newton touchdown. Late in the first quarter Andy Dalton threw a pass intended for John Ross but it was intercepted by Donte Jackson. Early in the second Devin Funchess scored a touchdown with a Graham Gano field goal, and Carolina took the lead. Dalton was sacked by Efe Obada and fumbled the ball. Carolina recovered but the call was reversed and the Bengals soon tied the game at 14. Carolina took back the lead with a C. J. Anderson touchdown. In the third Dalton was picked off again, this time by Obada. Cincinnati soon followed a Newton TD with a touchdown of their own, moving to within seven. With less than four minutes to go, Jackson intercepted a Dalton pass intended for Ross. Gano then kicked a field goal making the score 31–21. Dalton's Hail Mary attempt, intended for Tyler Eifert, was picked off by Luke Kuechly. The Panthers won and improved to 2–1.

==== Week 5: vs. New York Giants ====
Week Five: New York Giants at Carolina Panthers – Game summary

Quarter	1	2	3	4	Total
Giants	3	10	3	15	**31**
**Panthers**	7	13	0	13	**33**

at Bank of America Stadium, Charlotte, North Carolina

- Date: October 7
- Game time: 1:00 p.m. EDT
- Game weather: 80 °F (27 °C), cloudy
- Game attendance: 74,221
- Referee: Jerome Boger
- TV announcers (Fox): Kenny Albert, Charles Davis, and Pam Oliver
- Recap, Gamebook

Game information

**First quarter**

- NYG – Aldrick Rosas 42-yard field goal, 7:24. Giants 3–0. **Drive: 6 plays, 16 yards, 2:57.**
- CAR – Curtis Samuel 25-yard pass from Cam Newton (Graham Gano kick), 4:38. Panthers 7–3. **Drive: 5 plays, 57 yards, 2:48.**

**Second quarter**

- CAR – Colin Jones fumble recovery in end zone (Graham Gano kick), 14:06. Panthers 14–3.
- CAR – Graham Gano 47-yard field goal, 8:44. Panthers 17–3. **Drive: 7 plays, 51 yards, 4:24.**
- NYG – Saquon Barkley 57-yard pass from Odell Beckham Jr. (Aldrick Rosas kick), 6:37. Panthers 17–10. **Drive: 4 plays, 75 yards, 2:07.**
- CAR – Graham Gano 47-yard field goal, 2:36. Panthers 20–10. **Drive: 8 plays, 31 yards, 4:01.**
- NYG – Aldrick Rosas 53-yard field goal, 0:20. Panthers 20–13. **Drive: 7 plays, 40 yards, 2:16.**

**Third quarter**

- NYG – Aldrick Rosas 36-yard field goal, 7:34. Panthers 20–16. **Drive: 13 plays, 75 yards, 5:36.**

**Fourth quarter**

- CAR – Christian McCaffrey 18-yard pass from Cam Newton (Graham Gano kick), 11:21. Panthers 27–16. **Drive: 9 plays, 68 yards, 5:09.**
- NYG – Odell Beckham Jr. 33-yard pass from Eli Manning (Eli Manning-Rhett Ellison pass), 8:08. Panthers 27–24. **Drive: 2 plays, 34 yards, 0:45.**
- CAR – Graham Gano 39-yard field goal, 2:16. Panthers 30–24. **Drive: 12 plays, 54 yards, 5:52.**
- NYG – Saquon Barkley 15-yard pass from Eli Manning (Aldrick Rosas kick), 1:08. Giants 31–30. **Drive: 4 plays, 75 yards, 1:08.**
- CAR – Graham Gano 63-yard field goal, 0:01. Panthers 33–31. **Drive: 8 plays, 30 yards, 1:07.**

**Top passers**

- NYG – Eli Manning – 22/36, 326 yards, 2 TD, 2 INT
- CAR – Cam Newton – 21/35, 237 yards, 2 TD, 2 INT

**Top rushers**

- NYG – Saquon Barkley – 15 carries, 48 yards
- CAR – Christian McCaffrey – 17 carries, 58 yards

**Top receivers**

- NYG – Odell Beckham Jr. – 8 receptions, 131 yards, 1 TD
- CAR – Devin Funchess – 4 receptions, 53 yards

The Panthers came back after their bye week and took on the New York Giants at home. Carolina went into the third quarter with a 20–13 lead. New York scored a field goal in the third quarter, decreasing the Panthers' lead to four. In the fourth quarter, the Giants scored a touchdown with a two-point conversion, followed by a Carolina field goal. With 1:15 to go in the game, the Giants scored on a Saquon Barkley touchdown catch, giving New York their first lead since the first quarter. The Panthers, down 31-30, only had a little more than a minute to try to win. They were able to get in field goal position. With six seconds to go, Graham Gano's 63-yard field goal was good. It was the longest successful field goal in franchise history and Gano became one of only six players to make a kick from 63 yards or longer. The Panthers won 33–31, improving to 3–1.

==== Week 6: at Washington Redskins ====
Week Six: Carolina Panthers at Washington Redskins – Game summary

Quarter	1	2	3	4	Total
Panthers	0	6	3	8	**17**
**Redskins**	14	3	0	6	**23**

at FedExField, Landover, Maryland

- Date: October 14
- Game time: 1:00 p.m. EDT
- Game weather: 52 °F (11 °C), cloudy
- Game attendance: 60,482
- Referee: Clay Martin
- TV announcers (Fox): Kenny Albert, Charles Davis, and Pam Oliver
- Recap, Gamebook

Game information

First quarter

- WAS – Vernon Davis 22-yard pass from Alex Smith (Dustin Hopkins kick), 10:20. Redskins 7–0. **Drive: 1 plays, 22 yards, 0:06.**
- WAS – Paul Richardson 2-yard pass from Alex Smith (Dustin Hopkins kick), 3:02. Redskins 14–0. **Drive: 12 plays, 64 yards, 6:14.**

Second quarter

- WAS – Dustin Hopkins 49-yard field goal, 5:30. Redskins 17–0. **Drive: 10 plays, 36 yards, 5:54.**
- CAR – Devin Funchess 23-yard pass from Cam Newton (kick failed), 3:05. Redskins 17–6. **Drive: 7 plays, 75 yards, 2:25.**

Third quarter

- CAR – Graham Gano 32-yard field goal, 5:08. Redskins 17–9. **Drive: 11 plays, 47 yards, 5:32.**

Fourth quarter

- WAS – Dustin Hopkins 56-yard field goal, 12:40. Redskins 20–9. **Drive: 12 plays, 42 yards, 7:28.**
- CAR – Torrey Smith 3-yard pass from Cam Newton (Cam Newton-Torrey Smith pass), 8:32. Redskins 20–17. **Drive: 9 plays, 75 yards, 4:08.**
- WAS – Dustin Hopkins 29-yard field goal, 3:15. Redskins 23–17. **Drive: 10 plays, 64 yards, 5:17.**

Top passers

- CAR – Cam Newton – 27/40, 275 yards, 2 TD, INT
- WAS – Alex Smith – 21/36, 163 yards, 2 TD

Top rushers

- CAR – Cam Newton – 9 rushes, 43 yards
- WAS – Adrian Peterson – 17 rushes, 97 yards

Top receivers

- CAR – Devin Funchess – 5 receptions, 74 yards, TD
- WAS – Vernon Davis – 3 receptions, 48 yards, TD

Things didn't start off well for the Panthers. Rookie D. J. Moore fumbled on a punt return and Washington recovered. This put the Redskins at a perfect spot to score and they did so. The Panthers had multiple turnovers in the first quarter, giving the Redskins a 14–0 lead by the end of one. The Panthers were able to catch up to the Redskins and had a chance to take the lead late in the fourth quarter. However, on fourth down and 5 at the Redskins 16, Cam Newton's pass for Jarius Wright fell incomplete. With the close loss of 17–23, the Panthers fell to 3–2.
This game saw the return of both Greg Olsen, who had been out with a foot injury since week one, and Thomas Davis, who was suspended for the first four games of the season.

==== Week 7: at Philadelphia Eagles ====
Week Seven: Carolina Panthers at Philadelphia Eagles – Game summary

Quarter	1	2	3	4	Total
**Panthers**	0	0	0	21	**21**
Eagles	0	10	7	0	**17**

at Lincoln Financial Field, Philadelphia, Pennsylvania

- Date: October 21
- Game time: 1:00 p.m. EDT
- Game weather: 49 °F (9 °C), partly sunny
- Game attendance: 69,696
- Referee: Clete Blakeman
- TV announcers (Fox): Kenny Albert, Charles Davis and Pam Oliver
- Recap, Gamebook

Game information

First quarter

- No Scoring plays.

Second quarter

- PHI – Alshon Jeffery 11-yard pass from Carson Wentz (Jake Elliott kick), 11:39. Eagles 7–0. **Drive: 7 plays, 74 yards, 3:44.**
- PHI – Jake Elliott 46-yard field goal, 6:36. Eagles 10–0. **Drive: 6 plays, 60 yards, 3:21.**

Third quarter

- PHI – Dallas Goedert 1-yard pass from Carson Wentz (Jake Elliott kick), 0:39. Eagles 17–0. **Drive: 17 plays, 49 yards, 9:22.**

Fourth quarter

- CAR – Curtis Samuel 14-yard run (kick failed), 10:41. Eagles 17–6. **Drive: 11 plays, 80 yards, 4:58.**
- CAR – Devin Funchess 18-yard pass from Cam Newton (Cam Newton-Jarius Wright pass), 4:08. Eagles 17–14. **Drive: 7 plays, 78 yards, 2:44.**
- CAR – Greg Olsen 1-yard pass from Cam Newton (Graham Gano kick), 1:22. Panthers 21–17. **Drive: 10 plays, 69 yards, 0:55.**

**Top passers**

- CAR – Cam Newton – 25/39, 269 yards, 2 TD
- PHI – Carson Wentz – 30/37, 310 yards, 2 TD

**Top rushers**

- CAR – Cam Newton – 7 carries, 49 yards
- PHI – Wendell Smallwood – 9 carries, 32 yards

**Top receivers**

- CAR – Devin Funchess – 6 receptions, 62 yards, 1 TD
- PHI – Zach Ertz – 9 receptions, 138 yards

The Panthers were down 17-0 going into the fourth quarter with a seemingly lifeless offense. However, the team scored 21 points in the 4th quarter and beat the shell-shocked Eagles 21–17, improving to 4–2. They sealed the victory after preventing a 4th down conversion by the Eagles in the closing seconds of the 4th quarter. It was the largest 4th quarter comeback win in team history, and the largest comeback in franchise history.

==== Week 8: vs. Baltimore Ravens ====
Week Eight: Baltimore Ravens at Carolina Panthers – Game summary

Quarter	1	2	3	4	Total
Ravens	7	0	7	7	**21**
**Panthers**	7	17	3	9	**36**

at Bank of America Stadium, Charlotte, North Carolina

- Date: October 28
- Game time: 1:00 p.m. EDT
- Game weather: 61 °F (16 °C), sunny
- Game attendance: 73,843
- Referee: Pete Morelli
- TV announcers (CBS): Greg Gumbel, Trent Green, Bruce Arians, and Melanie Collins
- Recap, Gamebook

Game information

**First quarter**

- BAL – Alex Collins 13-yard run (Justin Tucker kick), 7:50. Ravens 7–0. **Drive: 11 plays, 75 yards, 7:10.**
- CAR – Christian McCaffrey 11-yard run (Graham Gano kick), 0:36. Tied 7–7. **Drive: 4 plays, 54 yards, 2:14.**

**Second quarter**

- CAR – Greg Olsen 11-yard pass from Cam Newton (Graham Gano kick), 13:25. Panthers 14–7. **Drive: 3 plays, 12 yards, 1:28.**
- CAR – Christian McCaffrey 6-yard pass from Cam Newton (Graham Gano kick), 3:45. Panthers 21–7. **Drive: 10 plays, 99 yards, 6:03.**
- CAR – Graham Gano 54-yard field goal, 0:00. Panthers 24–7. **Drive: 6 plays, 35 yards, 0:52.**

**Third quarter**

- CAR – Graham Gano 44-yard field goal, 2:58. Panthers 27–7. **Drive: 5 plays, 23 yards, 2:33.**
- BAL – Javorius Allen 9-yard pass from Joe Flacco (Justin Tucker kick), 0:10. Panthers 27–14. **Drive: 10 plays, 75 yards, 2:48.**

**Fourth quarter**

- CAR – Cam Newton 12-yard run (pass failed), 9:52. Panthers 33–14. **Drive: 9 plays, 85 yards, 5:18.**
- CAR – Graham Gano 30-yard field goal, 3:10. Panthers 36–14. **Drive: 11 plays, 42 yards, 5:41.**
- BAL – Hayden Hurst 26-yard pass from Lamar Jackson (Justin Tucker kick), 1:02. Panthers 36–21. **Drive: 7 plays, 64 yards, 2:08.**

**Top passers**

- BAL – Joe Flacco – 22/39, 192 yards, 1 TD, 2 INT
- CAR – Cam Newton – 21/29, 219 yards, 2 TD

**Top rushers**

- BAL – Alex Collins – 11 carries, 49 yards, 1 TD
- CAR – Cam Newton – 10 carries, 52 yards, 1 TD

**Top receivers**

- BAL – Willie Snead IV – 5 receptions, 54 yards
- CAR – D. J. Moore – 5 receptions, 90 yards

Carolina and Baltimore went into the second quarter tied at seven. In the beginning of the second, Kyle Love tipped the ball out of QB Joe Flacco's hands, and the ball was recovered by Luke Kuechly. Greg Olsen scored a touchdown for the Panthers. Towards the end of the second, Cam Newton threw the ball into the end zone. Baltimore tipped it but Christian McCaffrey was able to catch it and score. With two seconds to go in the half, Graham Gano kicked a field goal, giving Carolina a 24–7 lead. In the third, Gano kicked another field goal. Alex Collins scored a touchdown for the Ravens making it a 27–14 Panthers lead. Newton scored a touchdown in the fourth but a two-point conversion attempt was no good. Gano later made another field goal. The Panthers won 36–21 and improved to 5–2.

==== Week 9: vs. Tampa Bay Buccaneers ====
Week Nine: Tampa Bay Buccaneers at Carolina Panthers – Game summary

Quarter	1	2	3	4	Total
Buccaneers	0	14	7	7	**28**
**Panthers**	14	21	0	7	**42**

at Bank of America Stadium, Charlotte, North Carolina

- Date: November 4
- Game time: 1:00 p.m. EST
- Game weather: 62 °F (17 °C), sunny
- Game attendance: 73,513
- Referee: Tony Corrente
- TV announcers (Fox): Kenny Albert, Ronde Barber, and Sara Walsh
- Recap, Gamebook

Game information

First quarter

- CAR – Alexander Armah 1-yard run (Graham Gano kick), 10:34. Panthers 7–0. **Drive: 3 plays, 10 yards, 1:09.**
- CAR – Christian McCaffrey 3-yard run (Graham Gano kick), 3:14. Panthers 14–0. **Drive: 8 plays, 88 yards, 3:58.**

Second quarter

- TB – O. J. Howard 4-yard pass from Ryan Fitzpatrick (Chandler Catanzaro kick), 14:15. Panthers 14–7. **Drive: 8 plays, 75 yards, 3:59.**
- CAR – Curtis Samuel 33-yard run (Graham Gano kick), 11:20. Panthers 21–7. **Drive: 5 plays, 75 yards, 2:55.**
- CAR – Christian McCaffrey 1-yard run (Graham Gano kick), 7:24. Panthers 28–7. **Drive: 4 plays, 42 yards, 1:37.**
- CAR – Greg Olsen 17-yard pass from Cam Newton (Graham Gano kick), 4:01. Panthers 35–7. **Drive: 5 plays, 25 yards, 2:25.**
- TB – O. J. Howard 3-yard pass from Ryan Fitzpatrick (Chandler Catanzaro kick), 0:15. Panthers 35–14. **Drive: 11 plays, 75 yards, 3:46.**

Third quarter

- TB – Adam Humphries 5-yard pass from Ryan Fitzpatrick (Chandler Catanzaro kick), 5:14. Panthers 35–21. **Drive: 10 plays, 84 yards, 4:31.**

Fourth quarter

- TB – Adam Humphries 30-yard pass from Ryan Fitzpatrick (Chandler Catanzaro kick), 14:24. Panthers 35–28. **Drive: 6 plays, 79 yards, 2:22.**
- CAR – Curtis Samuel 19-yard pass from Cam Newton (Graham Gano kick), 9:04. Panthers 42–28. **Drive: 9 plays, 75 yards, 5:20.**

**Top passers**

- TB – Ryan Fitzpatrick – 24/40, 243 yards, 4 TD, 2 INT
- CAR – Cam Newton – 19/25, 247 yards, 2 TD

**Top rushers**

- TB – Peyton Barber – 11 carries, 31 yards
- CAR – Christian McCaffrey – 17 carries, 79 yards, 2 TD

**Top receivers**

- TB – Adam Humphries – 8 receptions, 82 yards, 2 TD
- CAR – Christian McCaffrey – 5 receptions, 78 yards

The Panthers went into half time up 35–14. In the third quarter Tampa Bay scored a touchdown making the score 35–21. Carolina and Tampa Bay both scored a touchdown in the fourth. The Panthers won 42–28, and improved to 6–2.

==== Week 10: at Pittsburgh Steelers ====
Week Ten: Carolina Panthers at Pittsburgh Steelers – Game summary

Quarter	1	2	3	4	Total
Panthers	7	7	0	7	**21**
**Steelers**	21	10	14	7	**52**

at Heinz Field, Pittsburgh, Pennsylvania

- Date: November 8
- Game time: 8:20 p.m. EST
- Game weather: 40 °F (4 °C), clear
- Game attendance: 62,881
- Referee: Walt Coleman
- TV announcers (Fox/NFLN): Joe Buck, Troy Aikman, Erin Andrews, Kristina Pink, and Mike Pereira
- Recap, Gamebook

Game information

**First quarter**

- CAR – Christian McCaffrey 20-yard pass from Cam Newton (Graham Gano kick), 10:29. Panthers 7–0. **Drive: 9 plays, 75 yards, 4:31.**
- PIT – JuJu Smith-Schuster 75-yard pass from Ben Roethlisberger (Chris Boswell kick), 10:18. Tied 7–7. **Drive: 1 plays, 75 yards, 0:11.**
- PIT – Vince Williams 17-yard interception return (Chris Boswell kick), 10:05. Steelers 14–7.
- PIT – James Conner 2-yard run (Chris Boswell kick), 4:35. Steelers 21–7. **Drive: 8 plays, 61 yards, 4:21.**

**Second quarter**

- PIT – Chris Boswell 50-yard field goal, 9:49. Steelers 24–7. **Drive: 9 plays, 60 yards, 5:01.**
- CAR – Christian McCaffrey 25-yard pass from Cam Newton (Graham Gano kick), 5:04. Steelers 24–14. **Drive: 9 plays, 73 yards, 4:42.**
- PIT – Antonio Brown 53-yard pass from Ben Roethlisberger (Chris Boswell kick), 3:08. Steelers 31–14. **Drive: 4 plays, 75 yards, 1:56.**

**Third quarter**

- PIT – Vance McDonald 12-yard pass from Ben Roethlisberger (Chris Boswell kick), 8:18. Steelers 38–14. **Drive: 12 plays, 75 yards, 6:42.**
- PIT – Jesse James 8-yard pass from Ben Roethlisberger (Chris Boswell kick), 0:18. Steelers 45–14. **Drive: 11 plays, 57 yards, 5:48.**

**Fourth quarter**

- PIT – Jaylen Samuels 6-yard pass from Ben Roethlisberger (Chris Boswell kick), 14:55. Steelers 52–14. **Drive: 2 plays, 9 yards, 0:15.**
- CAR – Christian McCaffrey 1-yard run (Graham Gano kick), 5:35. Steelers 52–21. **Drive: 7 plays, 34 yards, 3:41.**

**Top passers**

- CAR – Cam Newton – 23/29, 193 yards, 2 TD, INT
- PIT – Ben Roethlisberger – 22/25, 328 yards, 5 TD

**Top rushers**

- CAR – Christian McCaffrey – 14 carries, 77 yards, TD
- PIT – James Conner – 13 carries, 65 yards, TD

**Top receivers**

- CAR – Christian McCaffrey – 5 receptions, 61 yards, 2 TD
- PIT – Antonio Brown – 6 receptions, 96 yards, TD

In this Thursday night game, the Steelers were too much for the Panthers, as the Steelers' defense sacked Cam Newton five times and returned an interception for a touchdown, while their offense scored on seven of their eight drives under Ben Roethlisberger, who threw for five touchdowns and recorded a perfect passer rating, culminating in a 21–52 loss.

With the crushing loss, the Panthers' three game winning streak was snapped, and they fell to 6–3.

Cam Newton went 23 for 29, throwing for 193 yards, 2 touchdowns, and 1 interception, giving him a passer rating of 103 in spite of the Steelers suffocating defense.

==== Week 11: at Detroit Lions ====
Week Eleven: Carolina Panthers at Detroit Lions – Game summary

Quarter	1	2	3	4	Total
Panthers	7	0	0	12	**19**
**Lions**	7	3	3	7	**20**

at Ford Field, Detroit, Michigan

- Date: November 18
- Game time: 1:00 p.m. EST
- Game weather: Played indoors (dome stadium)
- Game attendance: 61,999
- Referee: Clay Martin
- TV announcers (Fox): Kenny Albert, Ronde Barber, and Jennifer Hale
- Recap, Gamebook

Game information

**First quarter**

- CAR – Greg Olsen 1-yard pass from Cam Newton (Graham Gano kick), 9:27. **Drive: 10 plays, 90 yards, 5:33.** Panthers 7–0.
- DET – Kerryon Johnson 8-yard rush (Matt Prater kick), 2:36. **Drive: 12 plays, 72 yards, 6:51.** Tied 7–7.

**Second quarter**

- DET – Matt Prater 54-yard field goal, 0:37. **Drive: 10 plays, 48 yards, 3:36.** Lions 10–7.

**Third quarter**

- DET – Matt Prater 32-yard field goal, 3:47. **Drive: 11 plays, 62 yards, 5:24.** Lions 13–7.

**Fourth quarter**

- CAR – Curtis Samuel 12-yard pass from Cam Newton (kick failed), 9:29. **Drive: 10 plays, 92 yards, 4:33.** Tied 13–13.
- DET – Kenny Golladay 19-yard pass from Matthew Stafford, 5:13. **Drive: 9 plays, 75 yards, 4:10.** Lions 20–13.
- CAR – D. J. Moore 8-yard pass from Cam Newton (pass failed), 1:07. **Drive: 6 plays, 75 yards, 1:37.** Lions 20–19.

**Top passers**

- CAR – Cam Newton – 25/37, 357 yards, 3 TD, INT
- DET – Matthew Stafford – 23/37, 220 yards, TD

**Top rushers**

- CAR – Christian McCaffrey – 13 carries, 53 yards
- DET – Kerryon Johnson – 15 carries, 87 yards, TD

**Top receivers**

- CAR – D. J. Moore – 7 receptions, 157 yards, TD
- DET – Kenny Golladay – 8 receptions, 113 yards, TD

Carolina had a chance to win at the end of the game with a two-point conversion attempt. However, Newton's pass intended for Wright fell incomplete. With the loss, the Panthers fall to 6-4.

==== Week 12: vs. Seattle Seahawks ====
Week Twelve: Seattle Seahawks at Carolina Panthers – Game summary

Quarter	1	2	3	4	Total
**Seahawks**	0	10	7	13	**30**
Panthers	3	10	7	7	**27**

at Bank of America Stadium, Charlotte, North Carolina

- Date: November 25
- Game time: 1:00 p.m. EST
- Game weather: 57 °F (14 °C), partly cloudy
- Game attendance: 74,002
- Referee: Shawn Smith
- TV announcers (Fox): Kevin Burkhardt, Charles Davis, and Pam Oliver
- Recap, Gamebook

Game information

**First quarter**

- CAR – Graham Gano 26-yard field goal, 2:11. Panthers 3–0. **Drive: 6 plays, 58 yards, 3:21.**

**Second quarter**

- SEA – Sebastian Janikowski 33-yard field goal, 12:41. Tied 3–3. **Drive: 12 plays, 60 yards, 4:30.**
- CAR – Curtis Samuel 7-yard pass from Cam Newton (Graham Gano kick), 6:15. Panthers 10–3. **Drive: 4 plays, 53 yards, 2:12.**
- SEA – Chris Carson 1-yard rush (Sebastian Janikowski kick), 2:24. Tied 10–10. **Drive: 7 plays, 80 yards, 3:54.**
- CAR – Graham Gano 25-yard field goal, 0:00. Panthers 13–10. **Drive: 8 plays, 60 yards, 2:24.**

**Third quarter**

- SEA – Tyler Lockett 12-yard pass from Russell Wilson (Sebastian Janikowski kick), 6:45. Seahawks 17–13. **Drive: 7 plays, 80 yards, 3:54.**
- CAR – Christian McCaffrey 1-yard rush (Graham Gano kick), 1:41. Panthers 20–17. **Drive: 8 plays, 75 yards, 5:04.**

**Fourth quarter**

- SEA – Sebastian Janikowski 30-yard field goal, 9:27. Tied 20–20. **Drive: 14 plays, 63 yards, 7:14.**
- CAR – Christian McCaffrey 2-yard pass from Cam Newton (Graham Gano kick), 6:57. Panthers 27–20. **Drive: 5 plays, 75 yards, 2:30.**
- SEA – David Moore 35-yard pass from Russell Wilson (Sebastian Janikowski kick), 3:26. Tied 27–27. **Drive: 7 plays, 75 yards, 3:31.**
- SEA – Sebastian Janikowski 31-yard field goal, 0:00. Seahawks 30–27. **Drive: 7 plays, 45 yards, 1:40.**

**Top passers**

- SEA – Russell Wilson – 22/31, 339 yards, 2 TD
- CAR – Cam Newton – 25/30, 256 yards, 2 TD, 1 INT

**Top rushers**

- SEA – Chris Carson – 16 carries, 55 yards, 1 TD
- CAR – Christian McCaffrey – 17 carries, 125 yards, 1 TD

**Top receivers**

- SEA – Tyler Lockett – 5 receptions, 107 yards, 1 TD
- CAR – Christian McCaffrey – 11 receptions, 112 yards, 1 TD

In a tight contest the Panthers were unable to put away the Seahawks, and lost 27–30. They fell to 6–5.

==== Week 13: at Tampa Bay Buccaneers ====
Week Thirteen: Carolina Panthers at Tampa Bay Buccaneers – Game summary

Quarter	1	2	3	4	Total
Panthers	7	0	10	0	**17**
**Buccaneers**	10	7	7	0	**24**

at Raymond James Stadium, Tampa, Florida

- Date: December 2
- Game time: 1:00 p.m. EST
- Game weather: 81 °F (27 °C), cloudy
- Game attendance: 52,568
- Referee: Carl Cheffers
- TV announcers (Fox): Kenny Albert, Ronde Barber, and Sara Walsh
- Recap, Gamebook

Game information

First quarter

- TB – Adam Humphries 3-yard pass from Jameis Winston (Cairo Santos kick), 9:46. Buccaneers 7–0. **Drive: 11 plays, 75 yards, 5:14.**
- TB – Cairo Santos 35-yard field goal, 6:41. Buccaneers 10–0. **Drive: 4 plays, 3 yards, 1:30.**
- CAR – Christian McCaffrey 8-yard pass from Cam Newton (Graham Gano kick), 4:14. Buccaneers 10–7. **Drive: 4 plays, 73 yards, 2:27.**

Second quarter

- TB – Chris Godwin 13-yard pass from Jameis Winston (Cairo Santos kick), 0:13. Buccaneers 17–7. **Drive: 5 plays, 32 yards, 0:52.**

Third quarter

- CAR – Graham Gano 37-yard field goal, 10:58. Buccaneers 17–10. **Drive: 9 plays, 56 yards, 4:02.**
- TB – Peyton Barber 1-yard rush (Cairo Santos kick), 7:23. Buccaneers 24–10. **Drive: 6 plays, 75 yards, 3:35.**
- CAR – Devin Funchess 10-yard pass from Cam Newton (Graham Gano kick), 2:24. Buccaneers 24–17. **Drive: 10 plays, 92 yards, 4:59.**

Fourth quarter

- No scoring plays.

**Top passers**

- CAR – Cam Newton – 28/41, 300 yards, 2 TD, 4 INT
- TB – Jameis Winston – 20/30, 249 yards, 2 TD

**Top rushers**

- CAR – Christian McCaffrey – 10 carries, 106 yards
- TB – Jameis Winston – 5 carries, 48 yards

**Top receivers**

- CAR – Christian McCaffrey – 9 receptions, 55 yards, 1 TD
- TB – Chris Godwin – 5 receptions, 101 yards, 1 TD

The Panthers, thanks in part to Newton's four interceptions, fell to 6-6. The day after the game, the Panthers announced defensive line coach Brady Hoke and assistant secondary/cornerbacks coach Jeff Imamura had been fired. Ron Rivera would also take over defensive play calling duties, although Washington would retain the title of defensive coordinator.

==== Week 14: at Cleveland Browns ====
Week Fourteen: Carolina Panthers at Cleveland Browns – Game summary

Quarter	1	2	3	4	Total
Panthers	7	10	3	0	**20**
**Browns**	7	10	0	9	**26**

at FirstEnergy Stadium, Cleveland, Ohio

- Date: December 9
- Game time: 1:00 p.m. EST
- Game weather: 28 °F (−2 °C), sunny
- Game attendance: 59,392
- Referee: Walt Anderson
- TV announcers (Fox): Dick Stockton, Mark Schlereth, Cris Carter, and Jennifer Hale
- Recap, Gamebook

Game information

**First quarter**

- CAR – Christian McCaffrey 4-yard rush (Chandler Catanzaro kick), 9:17. Panthers 7–0. **Drive: 10 plays, 65 yards, 5:43.**
- CLE – Jarvis Landry 3-yard rush (Greg Joseph kick), 7:41. Tied 7–7. **Drive: 3 plays, 75 yards, 1:36.**

**Second quarter**

- CAR – Christian McCaffrey 1-yard rush (Chandler Catanzaro kick), 14:13. Panthers 14–7. **Drive: 5 plays, 17 yards, 2:18.**
- CLE – Jarvis Landry 51-yard pass from Baker Mayfield (Greg Joseph kick), 8:27. Tied 14–14. **Drive: 8 plays, 75 yards, 5:46.**
- CAR – Chandler Catanzaro 30-yard field goal, 4:03. Panthers 17–14. **Drive: 8 plays, 70 yards, 4:24.**
- CLE – Greg Joseph 49-yard field goal, 0:59. Tied 17–17. **Drive: 8 plays, 44 yards, 3:04.**

**Third quarter**

- CAR – Chandler Catanzaro 34-yard field goal, 7:11. Panthers 20–17. **Drive: 10 plays, 38 yards, 4:26.**

**Fourth quarter**

- CLE – Nick Chubb 4-yard rush (kick failed), 13:05. Browns 23–20. **Drive: 6 plays, 75 yards, 3:31.**
- CLE – Greg Joseph 41-yard field goal, 8:46. Browns 26–20. **Drive: 6 plays, 40 yards, 3:55.**

**Top passers**

- CAR – Cam Newton – 26/42, 265 yards, 1 INT
- CLE – Baker Mayfield – 18/22, 238 yards, 1 TD

**Top rushers**

- CAR – Christian McCaffrey – 16 carries, 63 yards, 2 TD
- CLE – Nick Chubb – 13 carries, 66 yards, 1 TD

**Top receivers**

- CAR – Curtis Samuel – 4 receptions, 80 yards
- CLE – Breshad Perriman – 2 receptions, 81 yards

With the loss, Carolina fell to 6-7.

==== Week 15: vs. New Orleans Saints ====
Week Fifteen: New Orleans Saints at Carolina Panthers – Game summary

Quarter	1	2	3	4	Total
**Saints**	3	3	0	6	**12**
Panthers	7	0	0	2	**9**

at Bank of America Stadium, Charlotte, North Carolina

- Date: December 17
- Game time: 8:15 p.m. EST
- Game weather: 48 °F (9 °C), clear skies
- Game attendance: 74,188
- Referee: Tony Corrente
- TV announcers (ESPN): Joe Tessitore, Jason Witten, Booger McFarland, and Lisa Salters
- Recap, Gamebook

Game information

**First quarter**

- CAR – Chris Manhertz 50-yard pass from Christian McCaffrey (Chandler Catanzaro kick), 4:02. Panthers 7–0. **Drive: 7 plays, 90 yards, 3:24.**
- NO – Wil Lutz 46-yard field goal, 2:20. Panthers 7–3. **Drive: 5 plays, 23 yards, 1:46.**

**Second quarter**

- NO – Wil Lutz 24-yard field goal, 10:00. Panthers 7–6. **Drive: 12 plays, 69 yards, 5:50.**

**Third quarter**

- No scoring plays.

**Fourth quarter**

- NO – Alvin Kamara 16-yard rush (pass failed), 12:12. Saints 12–7. **Drive: 11 plays, 84 yards, 6:13.**
- CAR – Donte Jackson intercepted two-points conversion attempts. Saints 12–9.

**Top passers**

- NO – Drew Brees – 23/35, 203 yards, INT
- CAR – Cam Newton – 16/29, 131 yards, INT

**Top rushers**

- NO – Alvin Kamara – 14 carries, 67 yards, TD
- CAR – Christian McCaffrey – 15 carries, 53 yards

**Top receivers**

- NO – Michael Thomas – 7 receptions, 49 yards
- CAR – Christian McCaffrey – 8 receptions, 67 yards

The Panthers came into Monday night facing the NFC South champion and playoff-bound Saints. Carolina's defense stifled Drew Brees and the Saints offense for most of the game, forcing three turnovers. Cornerback Donte Jackson had a pick-two on a two-point conversion attempt and fellow corner James Bradberry had an interception. However, the Panthers offense stalled on several drives, including their final one. With the loss, the team's record fell to 6-8.

==== Week 16: vs. Atlanta Falcons ====
Week Sixteen: Atlanta Falcons at Carolina Panthers – Game summary

Quarter	1	2	3	4	Total
**Falcons**	7	3	14	0	**24**
Panthers	7	3	0	0	**10**

at Bank of America Stadium, Charlotte, North Carolina

- Date: December 23
- Game time: 1:00 p.m. EST
- Game weather: 52 °F (11 °C), sunny
- Game attendance: 73,722
- Referee: Pete Morelli
- TV announcers (Fox): Dick Stockton, Mark Schlereth, and Jennifer Hale
- Recap, Gamebook

Game information

**First quarter**

- CAR – Ian Thomas 1-yard pass from Taylor Heinicke (Chandler Catanzaro kick), 7:05. Panthers 7–0. **Drive: 14 plays, 73 yards, 8:03.**
- ATL – Julio Jones 1-yard pass from Matt Ryan (Matt Bryant kick), 0:44. Tied 7–7. **Drive: 13 plays, 85 yards, 6:19.**

**Second quarter**

- CAR – Chandler Catanzaro 50-yard field goal, 7:46. Panthers 10–7. **Drive: 9 plays, 46 yards, 5:22.**
- ATL – Matt Bryant 39-yard field goal, 5:35. Tied 10–10. **Drive: 6 plays, 55 yards, 2:09.**

**Third quarter**

- ATL – Calvin Ridley 75-yard pass from Matt Ryan (Matt Bryant kick), 14:51. Falcons 17-10. **Drive: 1 play, 75 yards, 0:09.**
- ATL – Mohamed Sanu 44-yard pass from Matt Ryan (Matt Bryant kick), 4:45. Falcons 24-10. **Drive: 7 plays, 85 yards, 4:06.**

**Fourth quarter**

- No scoring plays.

**Top passers**

- ATL – Matt Ryan – 15/26, 239 yards, 3 TD
- CAR – Taylor Heinicke – 33/53, 274 yards, TD, 3 INT

**Top rushers**

- ATL – Brian Hill – 8 rushes, 115 yards
- CAR – Christian McCaffrey – 21 rushes, 101 yards

**Top receivers**

- ATL – Calvin Ridley – 3 receptions, 90 yards, TD
- CAR – Christian McCaffrey – 12 receptions, 77 yards

During the week, the Panthers decided to give backup QB Taylor Heinicke his first NFL start due to Newton's injured shoulder. The Panthers lost 24-10, extending their losing streak to 7 games (6–9 overall). They were also both swept by the Falcons and eliminated from playoff contention as a result.

==== Week 17: at New Orleans Saints ====
Week Seventeen: Carolina Panthers at New Orleans Saints – Game summary

Quarter	1	2	3	4	Total
**Panthers**	13	10	7	3	**33**
Saints	0	0	0	14	**14**

at Mercedes-Benz Superdome, New Orleans, Louisiana

- Date: December 30
- Game time: 1:00 p.m. EST/12:00 p.m. CST
- Game weather: Played indoors (dome stadium)
- Game attendance: 73,028
- Referee: Bill Vinovich
- TV announcers (Fox): Kenny Albert, Ronde Barber, and Kristina Pink
- Recap, Gamebook

Game information

First quarter

- CAR – Kyle Allen 1-yard rush (Chandler Catanzaro kick), 10:04. Panthers 7–0. **Drive: 11 plays, 75 yards, 4:56.**
- CAR – Cameron Artis-Payne 15-yard rush (kick failed), 2:07. Panthers 13–0. **Drive: 9 plays, 89 yards, 4:51.**

Second quarter

- CAR – Ian Thomas 8-yard pass from Kyle Allen (Chandler Catanzaro kick), 2:00. Panthers 20–0. **Drive: 16 plays, 90 yards, 7:45.**
- CAR – Chandler Catanzaro 22-yard field goal, 0:00. Panthers 23–0. **Drive: 7 plays, 66 yards, 1:28.**

Third quarter

- CAR – Curtis Samuel 53-yard pass from Kyle Allen (Chandler Catanzaro kick), 3:46. Panthers 30–0. **Drive: 5 plays, 75 yards, 2:34.**

Fourth quarter

- NO – Tre'Quan Smith 9-yard pass from Teddy Bridgewater (Wil Lutz kick), 13:28. Panthers 30–7. **Drive: 9 plays, 75 yards, 5:18.**
- CAR – Chandler Catanzaro 51-yard field goal, 8:17. Panthers 33–7. **Drive: 9 plays, 42 yards, 5:11.**
- NO – Taysom Hill 9-yard rush (Wil Lutz kick), 3:47. Panthers 33–14. **Drive: 4 plays, 57 yards, 1:23.**

**Top passers**

- CAR – Kyle Allen – 16/27, 228 yards, 2 TD
- NO – Teddy Bridgewater – 14/22, 118 yards, 1 TD, 1 INT

**Top rushers**

- CAR – Cameron Artis-Payne – 16 carries, 56 yards
- NO – Dwayne Washington – 11 carries, 108 yards

**Top receivers**

- CAR – D. J. Moore – 4 receptions, 81 yards
- NO – Tre'Quan Smith – 3 receptions, 30 yards

This was the Panthers' only game outside of the Eastern Time Zone during the 2018 season. Kyle Allen made his first start at QB due to injuries. Behind Allen, the Panthers won 33-14. With the win, the Panthers finished the season 7-9 and snapped their 7-game losing streak.

=== Standings ===
==== Division ====
NFC South
	W	L	T	PCT	DIV	CONF	PF	PA	STK
^{(1)} New Orleans Saints	13	3	0	.813	4–2	9–3	504	353	L1
Atlanta Falcons	7	9	0	.438	4–2	7–5	414	423	W3
Carolina Panthers	7	9	0	.438	2–4	5–7	376	382	W1
Tampa Bay Buccaneers	5	11	0	.313	2–4	4–8	396	464	L4

==== Conference ====
NFC
#	Team	Division	W	L	T	PCT	DIV	CONF	SOS	SOV	STK
**Division leaders**
1 (Note: New Orleans finished ahead of LA Rams based on head-to-head victory, claiming the No. 1 seed.)	New Orleans Saints	South	13	3	0	.813	4–2	9–3	.482	.488	L1
2	Los Angeles Rams	West	13	3	0	.813	6–0	9–3	.480	.428	W2
3	Chicago Bears	North	12	4	0	.750	5–1	10–2	.430	.419	W4
4	Dallas Cowboys	East	10	6	0	.625	5–1	9–3	.488	.444	W2
**Wild Cards**
5	Seattle Seahawks	West	10	6	0	.625	3–3	8–4	.484	.400	W2
6	Philadelphia Eagles	East	9	7	0	.563	4–2	6–6	.518	.486	W3
**Did not qualify for the postseason**
7	Minnesota Vikings	North	8	7	1	.531	3–2–1	6–5–1	.504	.355	L1
8 (Note: Atlanta finished ahead of Washington based on head-to-head victory. Atlanta finished ahead of Carolina based on head-to-head sweep. Washington finished ahead of Carolina based on head-to-head victory.)	Atlanta Falcons	South	7	9	0	.438	4–2	7–5	.482	.348	W3
9	Washington Redskins	East	7	9	0	.438	2–4	6–6	.486	.371	L2
10	Carolina Panthers	South	7	9	0	.438	2–4	5–7	.508	.518	W1
11	Green Bay Packers	North	6	9	1	.406	1–4–1	3–8–1	.488	.417	L1
12	Detroit Lions	North	6	10	0	.375	2–4	4–8	.504	.427	W1
13 (Note: NY Giants finished ahead of Tampa Bay based on head-to-head victory.)	New York Giants	East	5	11	0	.313	1–5	4–8	.527	.487	L3
14	Tampa Bay Buccaneers	South	5	11	0	.313	2–4	4–8	.523	.506	L4
15	San Francisco 49ers	West	4	12	0	.250	1–5	2–10	.504	.406	L2
16	Arizona Cardinals	West	3	13	0	.188	2–4	3–9	.527	.302	L4
**Tiebreakers** (Note: When breaking ties for three or more teams under the NFL's rules, they are first broken within divisions, then comparing only the highest-ranked remaining team from each division.)
