= Andre Smith (linebacker) =

American football player (born 1997)

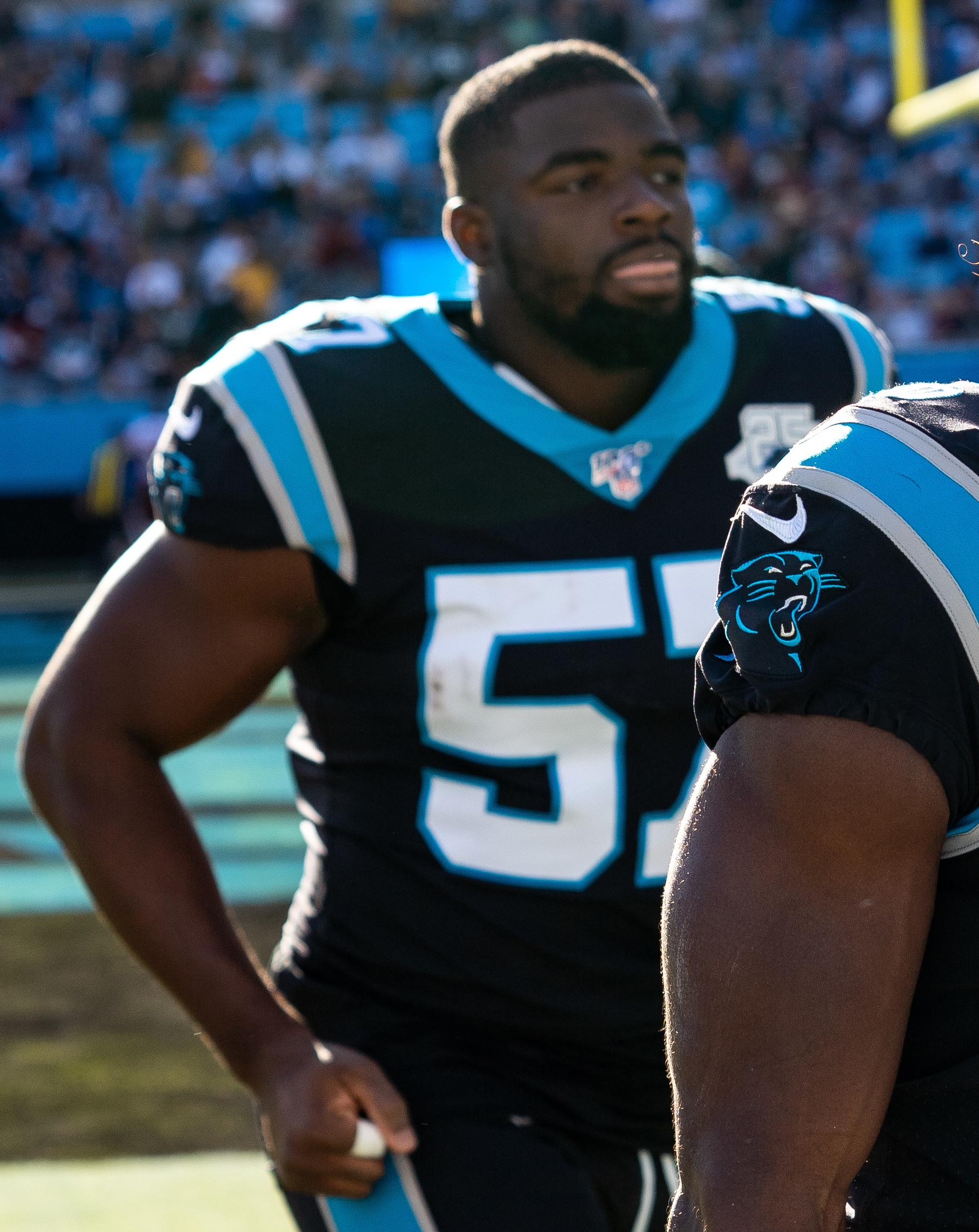
- Smith with the Carolina Panthers in 2019

Profile
- Position: Linebacker

Personal information
- Born: April 20, 1997 (age 29); Jacksonville, Florida, U.S.
- Listed height: 6 ft 0 in (1.83 m)
- Listed weight: 240 lb (109 kg)

Career information
- High school: Trinity Christian Academy (Jacksonville)
- College: North Carolina (2015–2017)
- NFL draft: 2018: 7th round, 234th overall pick

Career history
- Carolina Panthers (2018–2019); Buffalo Bills (2020–2022); Tennessee Titans (2022); Atlanta Falcons (2023); Denver Broncos (2024)*
- * Offseason or practice squad member only

Career NFL statistics as of 2024
- Total tackles: 52
- Forced fumbles: 2
- Fumble recoveries: 2
- Pass deflections: 1
- Stats at Pro Football Reference

Andre Smith Jr. (born April 20, 1997) is a former American professional football linebacker. He played college football at North Carolina.

== Early life ==
Smith attended Trinity Christian Academy in Jacksonville, Florida. As a senior, he tallied 65 tackles with 5.5 being for loss. He committed to play football for the North Carolina Tar Heels in October 2013.

== College career ==
As a true freshman in 2015, Smith appeared in all 14 games for North Carolina, recording 53 tackles (including two for loss), one interception, one pass breakup, and one forced fumble.

In 2016, Smith played in all 13 games, starting 12 of them at middle linebacker. He made 113 tackles, second on the team, along with one interception, one sack, three pass deflections, and one forced fumble.

As a junior in 2017, Smith suffered a knee injury in North Carolina's second game against Louisville, forcing him to miss the remainder of the season. In only two games, he tallied 21 tackles and a 73 yard interception return. After the season, he declared for the 2018 NFL draft.

== Professional career ==
Pre-draft measurables
Height	Weight	Arm length	Hand span	40-yard dash	10-yard split	20-yard split	20-yard shuttle	Three-cone drill	Vertical jump	Broad jump	Bench press
5 ft 11 5/8 in (1.82 m)	237 lb (108 kg)	33 1/8 in (0.84 m)	10 in (0.25 m)	4.63 s	1.58 s	2.65 s	4.35 s	7.50 s	32.5 in (0.83 m)	9 ft 8 in (2.95 m)	19 reps

=== Carolina Panthers ===
Smith was drafted by the Carolina Panthers in seventh round (234th overall) of the 2018 NFL Draft, using the 7th round pick acquired from a trade that sent Kelvin Benjamin to the Buffalo Bills.

=== Buffalo Bills ===
On August 31, 2020, Smith was traded to the Buffalo Bills for a conditional 2023 seventh-round pick. He was waived on September 5, 2020, and signed to the practice squad the next day. He was elevated to the active roster on September 19, October 13, and October 24 for the team's weeks 2, 5, and 7 games against the Miami Dolphins, Tennessee Titans and New York Jets, and reverted to the practice squad after each game. He was promoted to the active roster on October 27.

On March 6, 2021, Smith signed a two-year contract extension with the Bills.

Smith was suspended the first six games of the 2022 season for violating the league’s policy against performance-enhancing substances. Smith was released from the Bills on October 17, 2022.

=== Tennessee Titans ===
On November 15, 2022, Smith was signed to the Titans practice squad. He was promoted to the active roster on December 29.

=== Atlanta Falcons ===
On May 15, 2023, Smith signed with the Atlanta Falcons. He was released on August 29, 2023, and re-signed to the practice squad. On September 27, 2023, Smith was promoted to the active roster. He was released on October 10 but was re-signed to the practice squad the next day. He was signed to the active roster on November 7.

=== Denver Broncos ===
On June 13, 2024, Smith signed with the Denver Broncos. He was released on August 26.

== Career statistics ==
Year	Team	Games		Tackles				Interceptions						Fumbles	
Year	Team	GP	GS	Comb	Solo	Ast	Sck	PDef	Int	Yds	Avg	Lng	TDs	FF	FR
2018	CAR	3	0	3	1	2	0.0	0	0	0	0	0	0	0	0
2019	CAR	16	0	5	5	0	0.0	0	0	0	0	0	0	0	0
2020	BUF	12	0	9	8	1	0.0	0	0	0	0	0	0	1	0
2021	BUF	15	0	10	4	6	0.0	0	0	0	0	0	0	0	1
2022	TEN	5	0	6	4	2	0.0	0	0	0	0	0	0	0	0
2023	ATL	11	1	19	13	6	0.0	0	0	0	0	0	0	1	1
Total		62	1	52	35	17	0	0	0	0	0	0	0	2	2
