= Alex Armah =

American football player (born 1994)

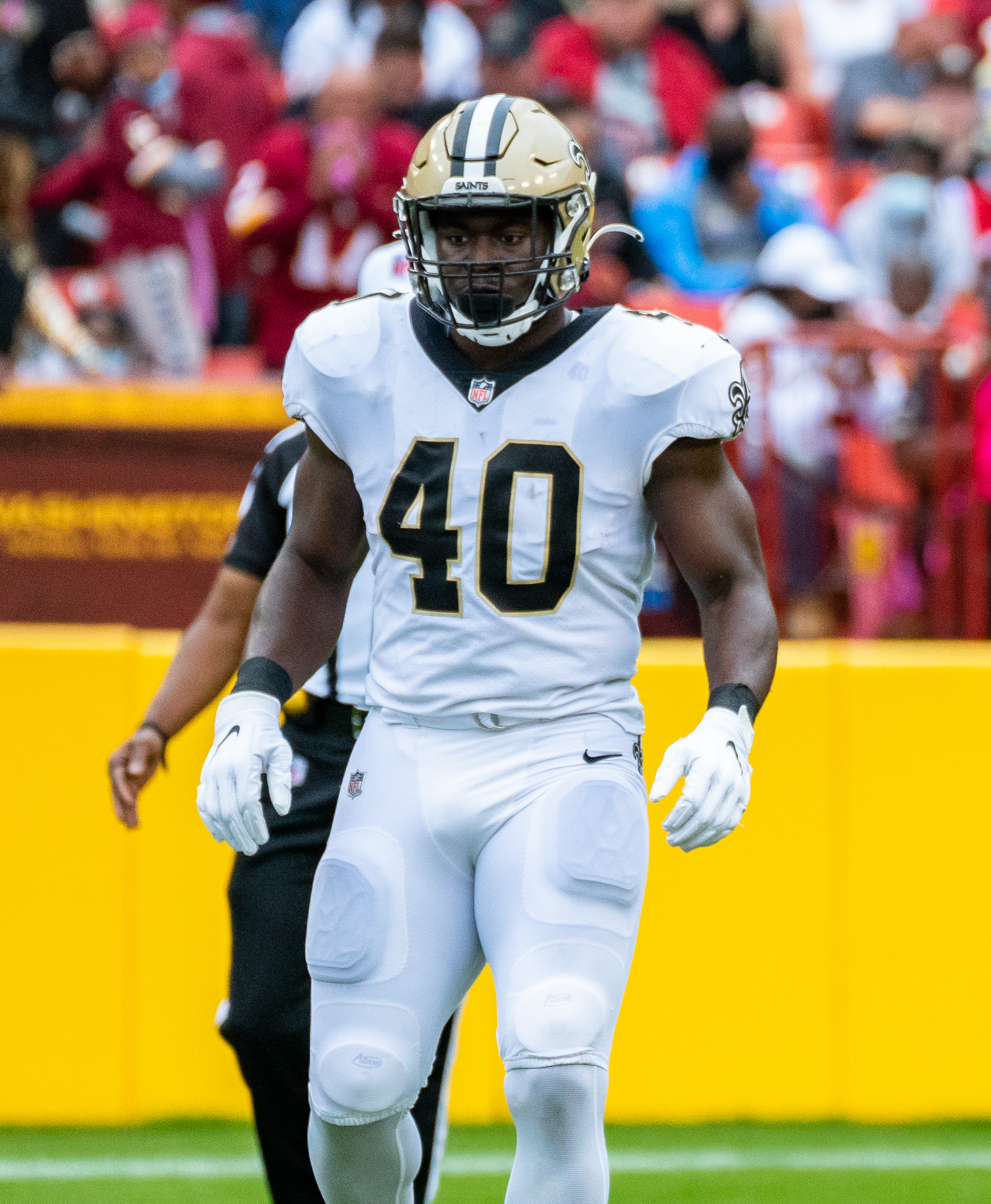
- Armah with the New Orleans Saints in 2021

No. 38, 40, 48
- Position: Fullback

Personal information
- Born: May 17, 1994 (age 32); Lawrenceville, Georgia, U.S.
- Listed height: 6 ft 1 in (1.85 m)
- Listed weight: 255 lb (116 kg)

Career information
- High school: Dacula (Dacula, Georgia)
- College: West Georgia (2013–2016)
- NFL draft: 2017: 6th round, 192nd overall pick

Career history
- Carolina Panthers (2017–2020); New Orleans Saints (2021); Washington Football Team / Commanders (2021–2023)

Career NFL statistics as of 2023
- Rushing yards: 56
- Rushing average: 2.2
- Rushing touchdowns: 3
- Receptions: 12
- Receiving yards: 43
- Receiving touchdowns: 1
- Stats at Pro Football Reference

Alexander Armah Jr. (born May 17, 1994) is an American former professional football player who was a fullback in the National Football League (NFL). He played college football for the West Georgia Wolves and was selected by the Carolina Panthers in sixth round of the 2017 NFL draft. Armah was also a member of the New Orleans Saints and Washington Commanders.

== Early life ==
Armah attended and played high school football at Dacula High School in Dacula, Georgia. Armah attended and played college football at the University of West Georgia.

== Professional career ==
Pre-draft measurables
Height	Weight	Arm length	Hand span	40-yard dash	10-yard split	20-yard split	20-yard shuttle	Three-cone drill	Vertical jump	Broad jump	Bench press
6 ft 0 1/8 in (1.83 m)	244 lb (111 kg)	33 in (0.84 m)	9 3/4 in (0.25 m)	4.70 s	1.56 s	2.76 s	4.29 s	7.00 s	34.5 in (0.88 m)	10 ft 2 in (3.10 m)	26 reps

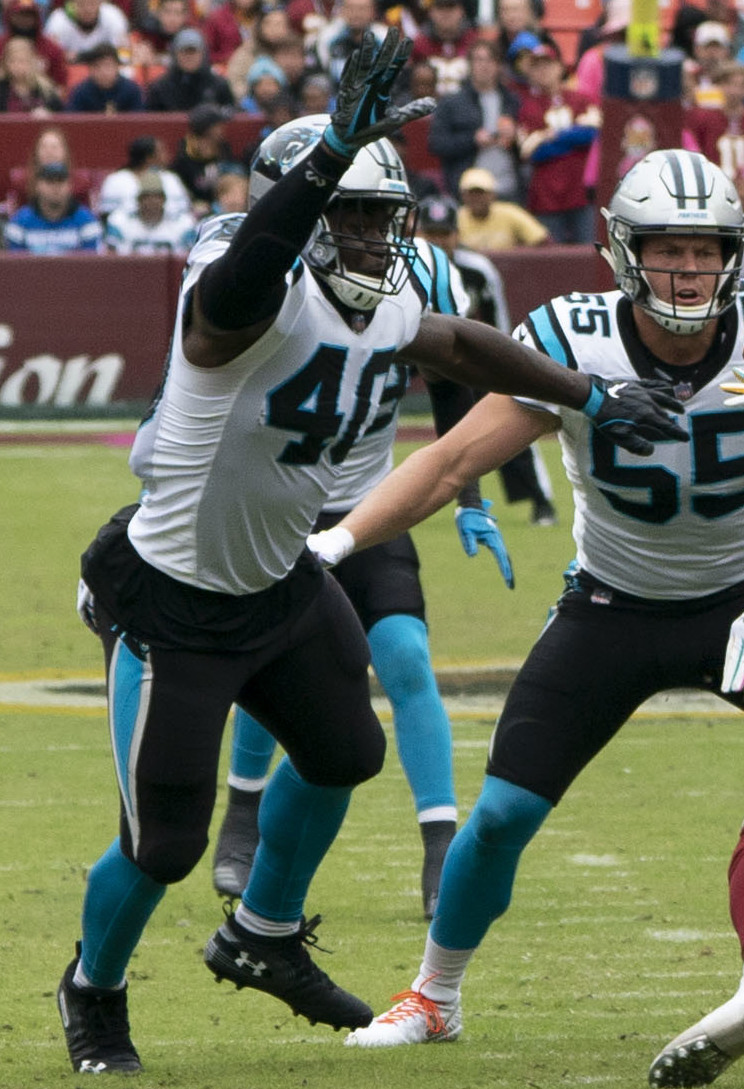
Armah (left) with the Carolina Panthers in 2018

=== Carolina Panthers ===
Armah was selected by the Carolina Panthers in the sixth round, 192nd overall, in the 2017 NFL draft. He was waived by the Panthers on September 3, 2017, and was signed to the practice squad the next day. He played in nine games his rookie season, and did not record any statistics. For the 2018 season, he survived training camp roster cuts and was named to the active roster. He made his 2018 debut in the season opener against the Dallas Cowboys. In the 16–8 victory, he scored his first career touchdown on a one-yard rush on his lone carry. On November 4, 2018, Armah scored his second career touchdown against the Tampa Bay Buccaneers. He appeared in all 16 games for 2018 season, mainly used as a blocking fullback and a special teamer. In the 2019 season, he appeared in all 16 games and recorded six carries for 11 rushing yards and one rushing touchdown.

=== New Orleans Saints ===
On March 19, 2021, Armah signed a one-year contract with the New Orleans Saints. He was released on August 31, 2021, and re-signed to the practice squad. He was promoted to the active roster on September 17, 2021. He was released on November 30.

=== Washington Football Team / Commanders ===
Armah signed with the practice squad of the Washington Football Team on December 2, 2021. On the Week 15 game against the Philadelphia Eagles, he was elevated to the active roster as a COVID-19 replacement player. He signed a reserve/future contract with Washington on January 11, 2022. Armah was placed on injured reserve on August 16, 2022, and released with an injury settlement a week later.

On October 19, 2022, Armah signed with Washington's practice squad. He signed a reserve/future contract on January 10, 2023.

On August 29, 2023, Armah was waived by the Commanders and re-signed to the practice squad. He was promoted to the active roster on October 28.

== Professional statistics ==
Season	Team	Games		Rushing					Receiving				
Season	Team	G	GS	Att	Yards	Avg	Long	TD	Rec	Yards	Avg	Long	TD
2017	CAR	9	0	-	-	-	-	-	-	-	-	-	-
2018	CAR	16	2	9	15	1.7	4	2	1	5	5	5	0
2019	CAR	16	1	6	11	1.8	4	1	2	6	3	4	0
2020	CAR	16	1	6	9	1.5	3	0	5	18	3.6	14	0
2021	NO	9	2	5	21	4.2	9	0	1	1	1	1	1
2021	WAS	2	0	-	-	-	-	-	-	-	-	-	-
Career		68	6	26	56	2.15	9	3	9	30	2.1	14	1
