= Jermaine Carter =

American football player (born 1995)

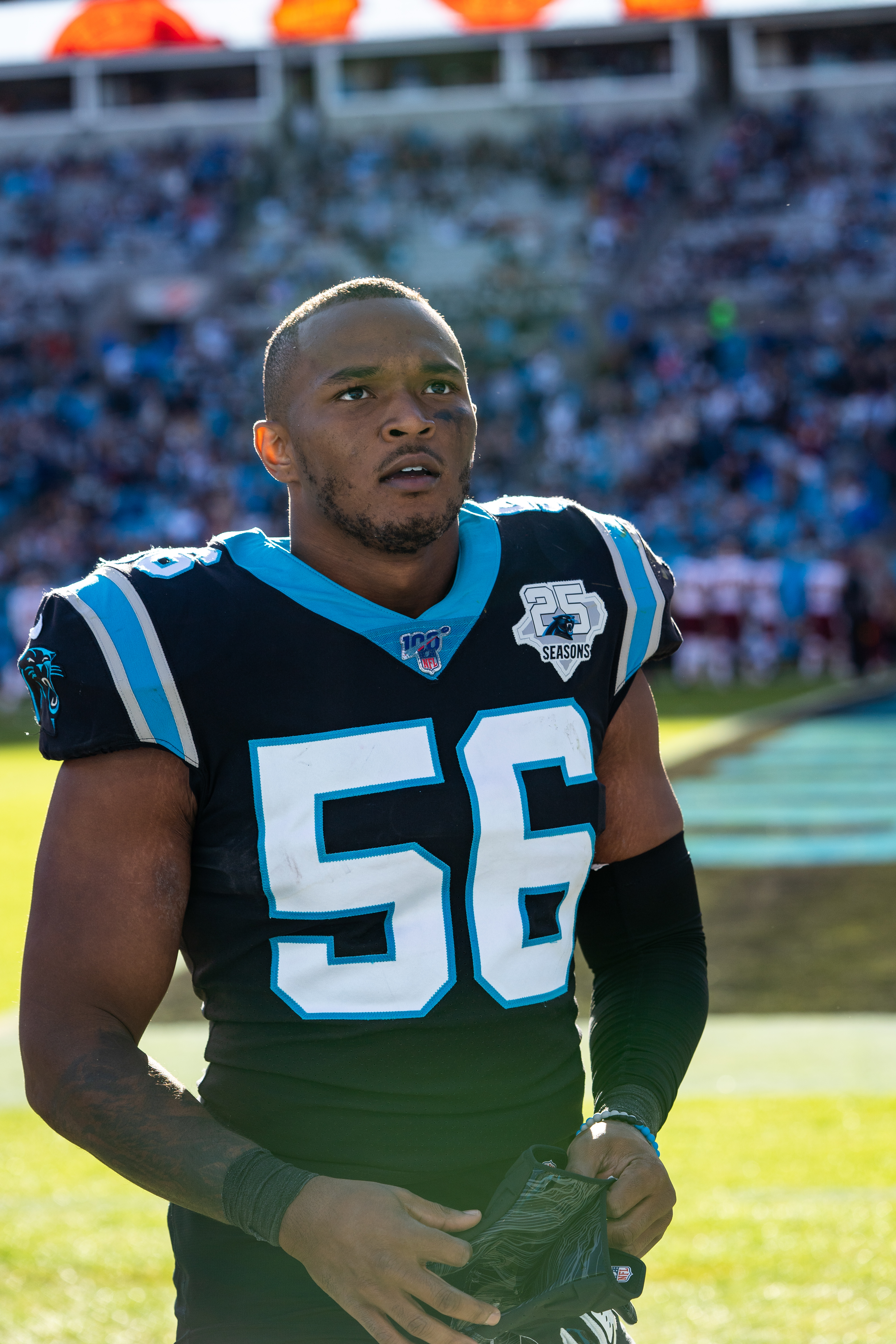
- Carter with the Carolina Panthers in 2019

Profile
- Position: Linebacker

Personal information
- Born: January 14, 1995 (age 31); Fort Washington, Maryland, U.S.
- Listed height: 6 ft 1 in (1.85 m)
- Listed weight: 225 lb (102 kg)

Career information
- High school: Friendship Collegiate Academy (Washington, D.C.)
- College: Maryland
- NFL draft: 2018: 5th round, 161st overall pick

Career history
- Carolina Panthers (2018–2021); Kansas City Chiefs (2022)*; Cleveland Browns (2022); Houston Texans (2023)*
- * Offseason or practice squad member only

Career NFL statistics
- Total tackles: 194
- Sacks: 0.5
- Fumble recoveries: 2
- Pass deflections: 2
- Stats at Pro Football Reference

Jermaine Carter Jr. (born January 14, 1995) is an American professional football linebacker. He played college football at Maryland, where he led the Terrapins with at least 90 tackles per year his last three seasons. He played in the National Football League (NFL) for the Carolina Panthers and Cleveland Browns.

== Professional career ==
=== Carolina Panthers ===
Carter was selected by the Carolina Panthers in the fifth round (161st overall) of the 2018 NFL draft. In his first season in the NFL in 2018, Carter played in 16 games and had six solo tackles with one for a loss and five assists. In the first NFL game of the 2019 season, Carter had three solo tackles, one assist, and a blocked punt that was recovered at the five-yard line; two plays later, Carolina scored on a Christian McCaffrey 2-yard touchdown run.

=== Kansas City Chiefs ===
Carter signed with the Kansas City Chiefs on March 25, 2022. He was released on August 30, 2022.

=== Cleveland Browns ===
Carter was signed to the practice squad of the Cleveland Browns on September 27, 2022. He was promoted to the active roster on December 14.

=== Houston Texans ===
On May 8, 2023, Carter signed with the Houston Texans. He was released on May 16.
