= Cole Luke =

American football player (born 1995)

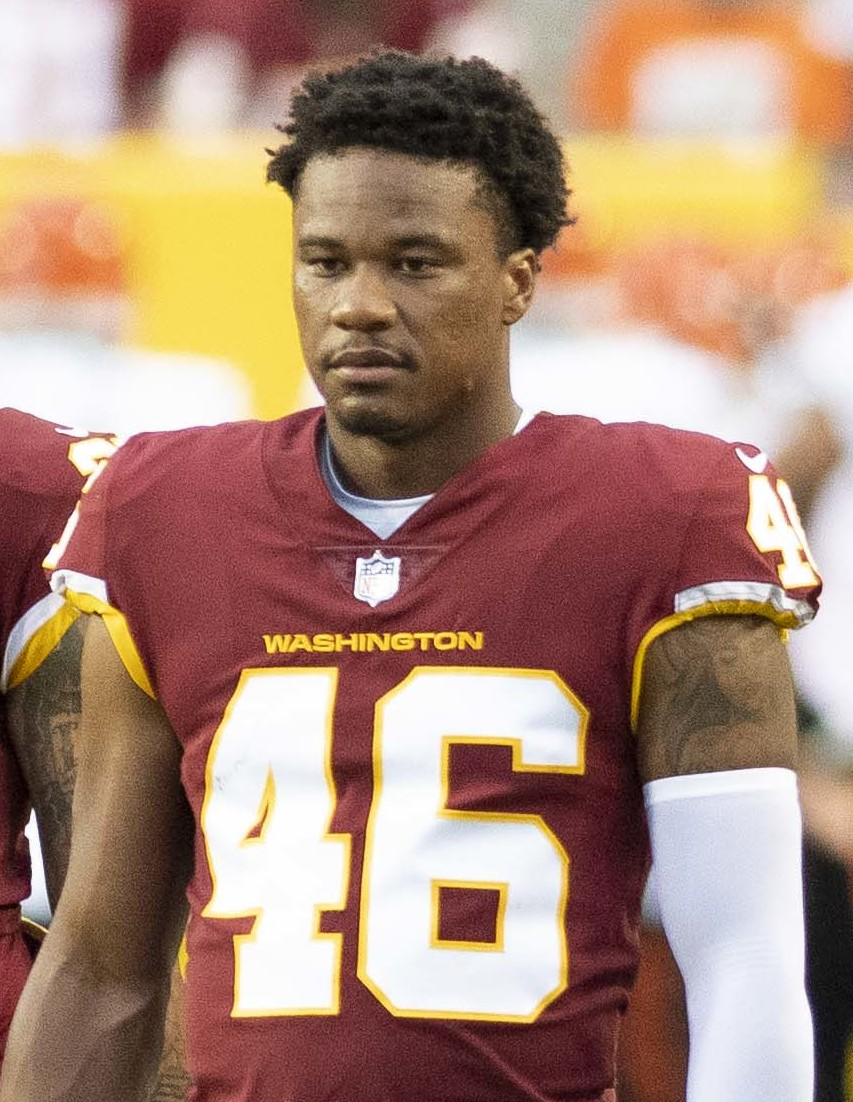
- Luke with Washington in 2021

No. 32, 46
- Position: Cornerback

Personal information
- Born: June 30, 1995 (age 31); Chandler, Arizona, U.S.
- Listed height: 5 ft 11 in (1.80 m)
- Listed weight: 200 lb (91 kg)

Career information
- High school: Hamilton (Chandler)
- College: Notre Dame
- NFL draft: 2017: undrafted

Career history
- Carolina Panthers (2017–2019); Washington Football Team (2020–2021)

Career NFL statistics
- Total tackles: 4
- Stats at Pro Football Reference

Cole Luke (born June 30, 1995) is an American former professional football player who was a cornerback in the National Football League (NFL). He played college football for the Notre Dame Fighting Irish and signed with the Carolina Panthers as an undrafted free agent in 2017.

== Early life and college ==
Luke was born on June 30, 1995, in Chandler, Arizona, later attending Hamilton High School. A 4-star recruit, Luke committed to play college football for the Notre Dame Fighting Irish, over offers from Arizona State, Michigan, Oklahoma, Texas, Utah, and Washington, among others. In his college career at Notre Dame University, he recorded 152 tackles, 24 passes defended and 8 interceptions.

== Professional career ==
=== Carolina Panthers ===
Luke signed with the Carolina Panthers as an undrafted free agent following the 2017 NFL draft. He was placed on injured reserve on September 14, 2017, with an ankle injury. On September 1, 2018, Luke was waived but signed to the practice squad the following day.

Luke signed a reserve/future contract with the team on December 31, 2018. He was waived during final roster cuts on August 31, 2019, but signed with the practice squad the following day. He was promoted to the active roster on November 8, 2019. Luke was waived on August 28, 2020.

=== Washington Football Team ===
Luke signed with the practice squad of the Washington Football Team on September 7, 2020. He was promoted to the active roster with a two-year contract on November 21, 2020. He was released on August 31, 2021, and re-signed to their practice squad on October 13, 2021, but released six days later.
