= 2021 Washington Football Team season =

90th season in franchise history

- Owner: Daniel Snyder
- General manager: Martin Mayhew
- President: Jason Wright
- Head coach: Ron Rivera
- Offensive coordinator: Scott Turner
- Defensive coordinator: Jack Del Rio
- Home stadium: FedExField

Results
- Record: 7–10
- Division place: 3rd NFC East
- Playoffs: Did not qualify
- Pro Bowlers: G Brandon Scherff; DT Jonathan Allen

Uniform
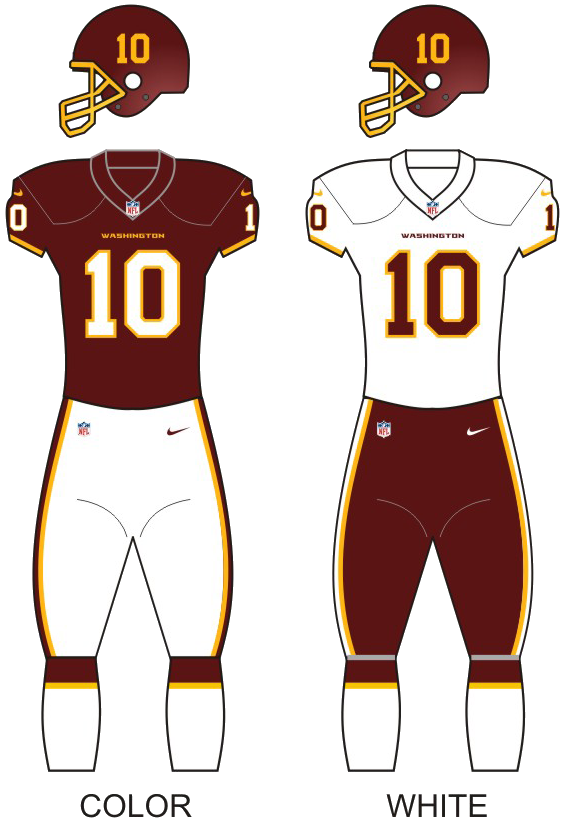

The 2021 season was the 90th season for the Washington Football Team in the National Football League (NFL) and their second under head coach Ron Rivera. Some additions and changes include the team hiring Martin Mayhew as general manager and Marty Hurney as another high-ranking executive. With the hiring of Mayhew, who is black, Washington became the first team in NFL history to concurrently have a minority general manager, head coach, and team president. Ryan Kerrigan, the franchise's all-time sack leader, became a free agent in the offseason and played the year with division rival Philadelphia Eagles.

Washington failed to improve upon their 7–9 record from the previous season, failed to repeat as division champions, and missed the playoffs for the fifth time in their past six seasons after a Week 17 home loss to the Philadelphia Eagles. Washington was also the first team since the 1995 Tampa Bay Buccaneers to have their final five games of the season be within the division. This season was also the second and final under the transitional "Football Team" moniker, as they rebranded as the "Commanders" in 2022.

One of the team's highlights was a 29–19 victory over defending Super Bowl LV champion Tampa Bay Buccaneers in Week 10. Meanwhile one of their lowlights was a 14–56 blowout loss to the Dallas Cowboys in Week 16.

== Draft ==
2021 NFL draft selections
Round	Pick	Player	Position	College
1	19	Jamin Davis	LB	Kentucky
2	51	Sam Cosmi	T	Texas
3	74	Benjamin St-Juste	CB	Minnesota
3	82	Dyami Brown	WR	North Carolina
4	124	John Bates	TE	Boise State
5	163	Darrick Forrest	SS	Cincinnati
6	225	Camaron Cheeseman	LS	Michigan
7	240	William Bradley-King	DE	Baylor
7	246	Shaka Toney	DE	Penn State
7	258	Dax Milne	WR	BYU

Notes

- Washington received a third-round selection from San Francisco in exchange for offensive tackle Trent Williams.
- Washington received a seventh-round selection and offensive tackle David Sharpe from Las Vegas in exchange for a 2020 sixth-round selection.
- Washington traded a seventh-round selection (244th overall) to Miami in exchange for a seventh-round selection (258th overall) and offensive guard Ereck Flowers.
- Washington received sixth- and seventh-round selections (225th and 240th overall) from Philadelphia in exchange for a 2022 fifth-round selection.

== Staff ==
2021 Washington Football Team staff
Front office: Owner – Daniel Snyder; CEO – Tanya Snyder; President – Jason Wright; General manager – Martin Mayhew; Executive vice president of football/player personnel – Marty Hurney; Senior vice president of football administration – Rob Rogers; Senior director of player personnel – Eric Stokes; Director of pro personnel – Chris Polian; Director of college personnel – Tim Gribble; Senior advisor – Doug Williams; Senior pro scout – Don Warren; College scouts - Paul Skansi, Sheldon White; Head coaches: Head coach – Ron Rivera; Offensive coaches: Offensive coordinator – Scott Turner; Quarterbacks – Ken Zampese; Running backs – Randy Jordan; Assistant running backs – Jennifer King; Wide receivers – Drew Terrell; Tight ends – Pete Hoener; Offensive line – John Matsko; Assistant offensive line – Travelle Wharton; Offensive quality control – Luke Del Rio and Todd Storm; Senior offensive assistant – Jim Hostler	Defensive coaches: Defensive coordinator – Jack Del Rio; Defensive line – Sam Mills III; Assistant defensive line – Jeff Zgonina; Linebackers – Steve Russ; Defensive backs – Chris Harris; Assistant defensive backs – Brent Vieselmeyer and Richard Rodgers Sr.; Defensive quality control – Vincent Rivera; Special teams coaches: Special teams coordinator – Nate Kaczor; Assistant special teams – Ben Jacobs; Strength and conditioning: Director of player performance – Brett Nenaber; Head strength and conditioning – Chad Englehart

== Final roster ==
2021 Washington Football Team roster
Quarterbacks (QB): 8 Kyle Allen; 19 Garrett Gilbert; 4 Taylor Heinicke; Running backs (RB): 24 Antonio Gibson; 32 Jaret Patterson; 35 Jonathan Williams; Wide receivers (WR): 2 Dyami Brown; 1 DeAndre Carter; 13 Adam Humphries; 17 Terry McLaurin; 15 Dax Milne; 10 Curtis Samuel; 11 Cam Sims; Tight ends (TE): 87 John Bates; 80 Sammis Reyes	Offensive linemen (OL): 77 Saahdiq Charles T; 76 Sam Cosmi T; 64 Jamil Douglas G; 79 Ereck Flowers G; 60 Keith Ismael C; 72 Charles Leno T; 78 Cornelius Lucas T; 75 Brandon Scherff G; 61 Jon Toth C; Defensive linemen (DL): 93 Jonathan Allen DT; 56 William Bradley-King DE; 98 Matt Ioannidis DT; 50 Nate Orchard DE; 94 Daron Payne DT; 57 Bunmi Rotimi DE; 97 Tim Settle DT; 96 James Smith-Williams DE; 90 Montez Sweat DE; 58 Shaka Toney DE; 95 Casey Toohill DE	Linebackers (LB): 52 Jamin Davis MLB; 46 Milo Eifler OLB; 45 De'Jon Harris OLB; 55 Cole Holcomb OLB; 51 David Mayo OLB; Defensive backs (DB): 30 Troy Apke CB; 31 Kamren Curl FS; 37 Corn Elder CB; 48 Darrick Forrest SS; 29 Kendall Fuller CB; 36 Danny Johnson CB; 20 Bobby McCain FS; 39 Jeremy Reaves FS; 34 Darryl Roberts CB; Special teams (ST): 54 Camaron Cheeseman LS; 16 Brian Johnson K; 3 Joey Slye K; 5 Tress Way P	Practice squad: 40 Alex Armah FB; 64 David Bada DT (IPP); 61 Zack Bailey G; 63 Beau Benzschawel G; 68 Shaq Calhoun G; 68 Tyler Clark DT; 18 Antonio Gandy-Golden WR; 14 D. J. Hayden CB; 84 Kelvin Harmon WR; 88 Temarrick Hemingway TE; 74 Nolan Laufenberg G; 89 Marken Michel WR; 38 Wendell Smallwood RB; 66 David Steinmetz T; 62 Gabe Wright DT; Reserve: 53 Jon Bostic OLB (IR); -- Dylan Cantrell TE (IR); 26 Landon Collins SS (IR); 22 Deshazor Everett SS (NF-Inj.); -- Ryan Fitzpatrick QB (IR); 47 Khaleke Hudson MLB (COVID-19); 23 William Jackson III CB (COVID-19); 57 Jalen Jelks DE (IR); 59 Jordan Kunaszyk MLB (COVID-19); 69 Tyler Larsen C (IR); 41 J. D. McKissic RB (IR); -- Torry McTyer CB (IR); -- Jared Norris OLB (IR); 73 Chase Roullier C (IR); 71 Wes Schweitzer G (IR); 83 Ricky Seals-Jones TE (IR); 25 Benjamin St-Juste CB (IR); 82 Logan Thomas TE (IR); 92 Daniel Wise DE (IR); 99 Chase Young DE (IR); Rookies in italics 53 active, 20 reserve, 14 practice squad (1 exempt)

== Schedule ==
=== Preseason ===
The preseason was reduced from four games to three with the regular season expanding to 17.

Week	Date	Opponent	Result	Record	Venue	Recap
1	August 12	at New England Patriots	**L** 13–22	0–1	Gillette Stadium	Recap
2	August 20	Cincinnati Bengals	**W** 17–13	1–1	FedExField	Recap
3	August 28	Baltimore Ravens	**L** 3–37	1–2	FedExField	Recap

=== Regular season ===
Week	Date	Opponent	Result	Record	Venue	Recap
1	September 12	Los Angeles Chargers	**L** 16–20	0–1	FedExField	Recap
2	September 16	**New York Giants**	**W** 30–29	1–1	FedExField	Recap
3	September 26	at Buffalo Bills	**L** 21–43	1–2	Highmark Stadium	Recap
4	October 3	at Atlanta Falcons	**W** 34–30	2–2	Mercedes-Benz Stadium	Recap
5	October 10	New Orleans Saints	**L** 22–33	2–3	FedExField	Recap
6	October 17	Kansas City Chiefs	**L** 13–31	2–4	FedExField	Recap
7	October 24	at Green Bay Packers	**L** 10–24	2–5	Lambeau Field	Recap
8	October 31	at Denver Broncos	**L** 10–17	2–6	Empower Field at Mile High	Recap
9	Bye					
10	November 14	Tampa Bay Buccaneers	**W** 29–19	3–6	FedExField	Recap
11	November 21	at Carolina Panthers	**W** 27–21	4–6	Bank of America Stadium	Recap
12	November 29	Seattle Seahawks	**W** 17–15	5–6	FedExField	Recap
13	December 5	at Las Vegas Raiders	**W** 17–15	6–6	Allegiant Stadium	Recap
14	December 12	**Dallas Cowboys**	**L** 20–27	6–7	FedExField	Recap
15	December 21	at **Philadelphia Eagles**	**L** 17–27	6–8	Lincoln Financial Field	Recap
16	December 26	at **Dallas Cowboys**	**L** 14–56	6–9	AT&T Stadium	Recap
17	January 2	**Philadelphia Eagles**	**L** 16–20	6–10	FedExField	Recap
18	January 9	at **New York Giants**	**W** 22–7	7–10	MetLife Stadium	Recap

Note: Intra-division opponents are in bold text.

=== Game summaries ===
==== Week 1: vs. Los Angeles Chargers ====
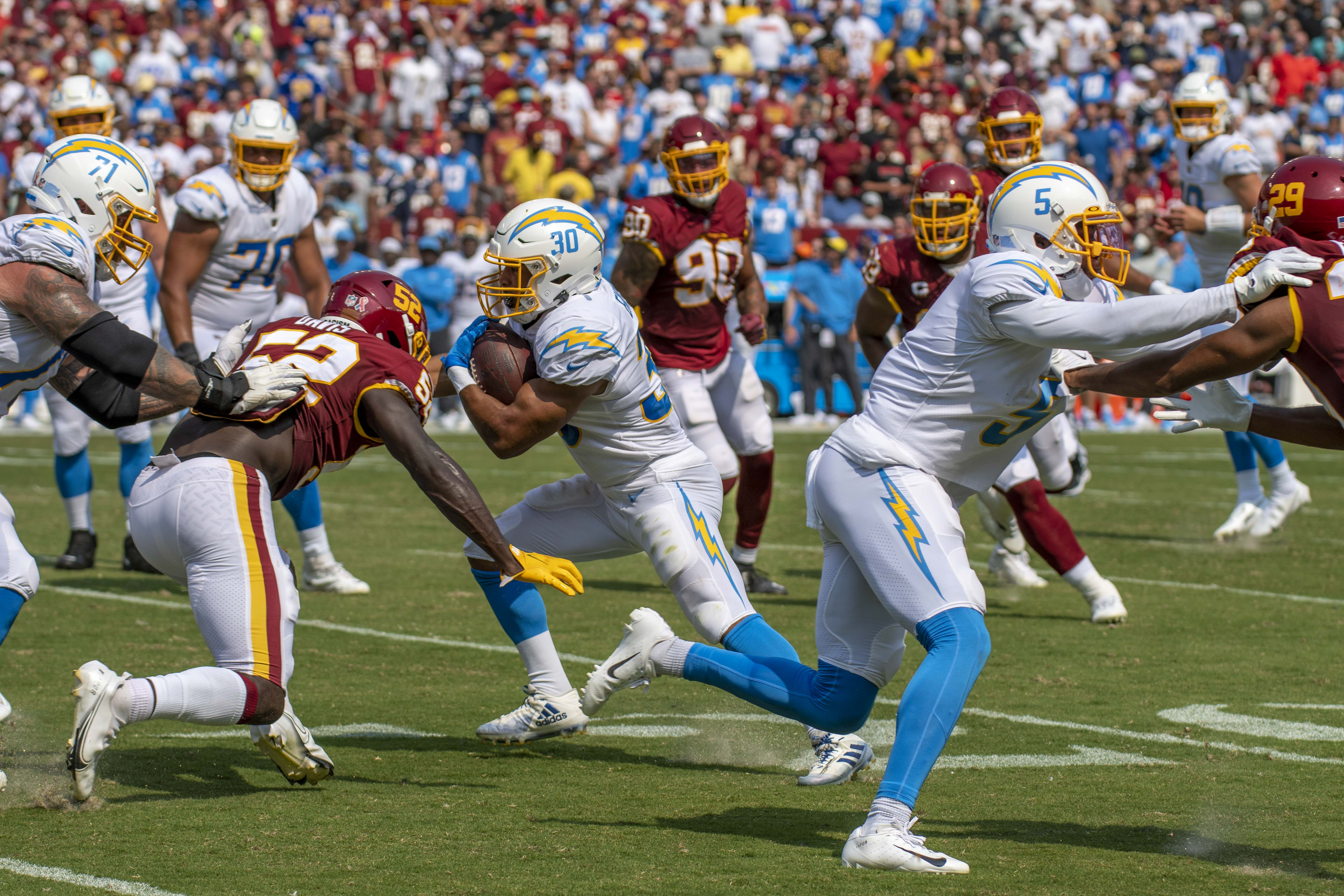
Washington vs. the Los Angeles Chargers

Week 1: Los Angeles Chargers at Washington Football Team – Game summary

Quarter	1	2	3	4	Total
**Chargers**	7	6	0	7	**20**
Football Team	3	6	7	0	**16**

at FedExField, Landover, Maryland

- Date: September 12
- Game time: 1:00 p.m. EDT
- Game weather: Sunny, 81 °F (27 °C)
- Game attendance: 52,753
- Referee: Alex Kemp
- TV announcers (CBS): Spero Dedes and Jay Feely
- Recap, Game Book

Game information

**First quarter**

- LAC – Austin Ekeler 3-yard run (Tristan Vizcaino kick), 9:14. Chargers 7–0. **Drive: 10 plays, 75 yards, 5:46.**
- WAS – Dustin Hopkins 30-yard field goal, 2:57. Chargers 7–3. **Drive: 6 plays, 36 yards, 3:07.**

**Second quarter**

- WAS – Dustin Hopkins 43-yard field goal, 13:36. Chargers 7–6. **Drive: 7 plays, 46 yards, 2:49.**
- LAC – Tristan Vizcaino 33-yard field goal, 9:06. Chargers 10–6. **Drive: 10 plays, 76 yards, 4:30.**
- LAC – Tristan Vizcaino 27-yard field goal, 0:45. Chargers 13–6. **Drive: 18 plays, 65 yards, 7:52.**
- WAS – Dustin Hopkins 48-yard field goal, 0:00. Chargers 13–9. **Drive: 5 plays, 45 yards, 0:45.**

**Third quarter**

- WAS – Logan Thomas 11-yard pass from Taylor Heinicke (Dustin Hopkins kick), 11:20. Football Team 16–13. **Drive: 8 plays, 81 yards, 3:40.**

**Fourth quarter**

- LAC – Mike Williams 3-yard pass from Justin Herbert (Tristan Vizcaino kick), 11:21. Chargers 20–16. **Drive: 3 plays, 3 yards, 0:45.**

**Top passers**

- LAC – Justin Herbert – 31/47, 337 yards, TD, INT
- WAS – Taylor Heinicke – 11/15, 122 yards, TD

**Top rushers**

- LAC – Austin Ekeler – 15 rushes, 57 yards, TD
- WAS – Antonio Gibson – 20 rushes, 90 yards

**Top receivers**

- LAC – Keenan Allen – 9 receptions, 100 yards
- WAS – Terry McLaurin – 4 receptions, 62 yards

The Chargers scored a TD with a 3 yard Austin Ekeler run on the first drive of the game. The rest of the scoring in the first half was an exchange of field goals which gave the Chargers a 13-9 lead. To mirror the start of the first half Washington scored a TD on the first drive of the half, with an 11 yard pass from Taylor Heinicke to Logan Thomas. Washington got the ball back in their own redzone thanks to a dubious call ruling Herbert had fumbled into the end zone under pressure from Montez Sweat. Hopkins then missed a field goal before the decisive moment came at the start of the 4th quarter. William Jackson intercepted Herbert in the Washington redzone but on the subsequent play Antonio Gibson fumbled the ball on the Washington 5 yard which was recovered by the Charger who then scored the game winning TD with a 3 yard pass to Mike Williams. This would be QB Ryan Fitzpatrick's last game, as he suffered a season ending injury in the second quarter and would promptly retire after the season.

==== Week 2: vs. New York Giants ====
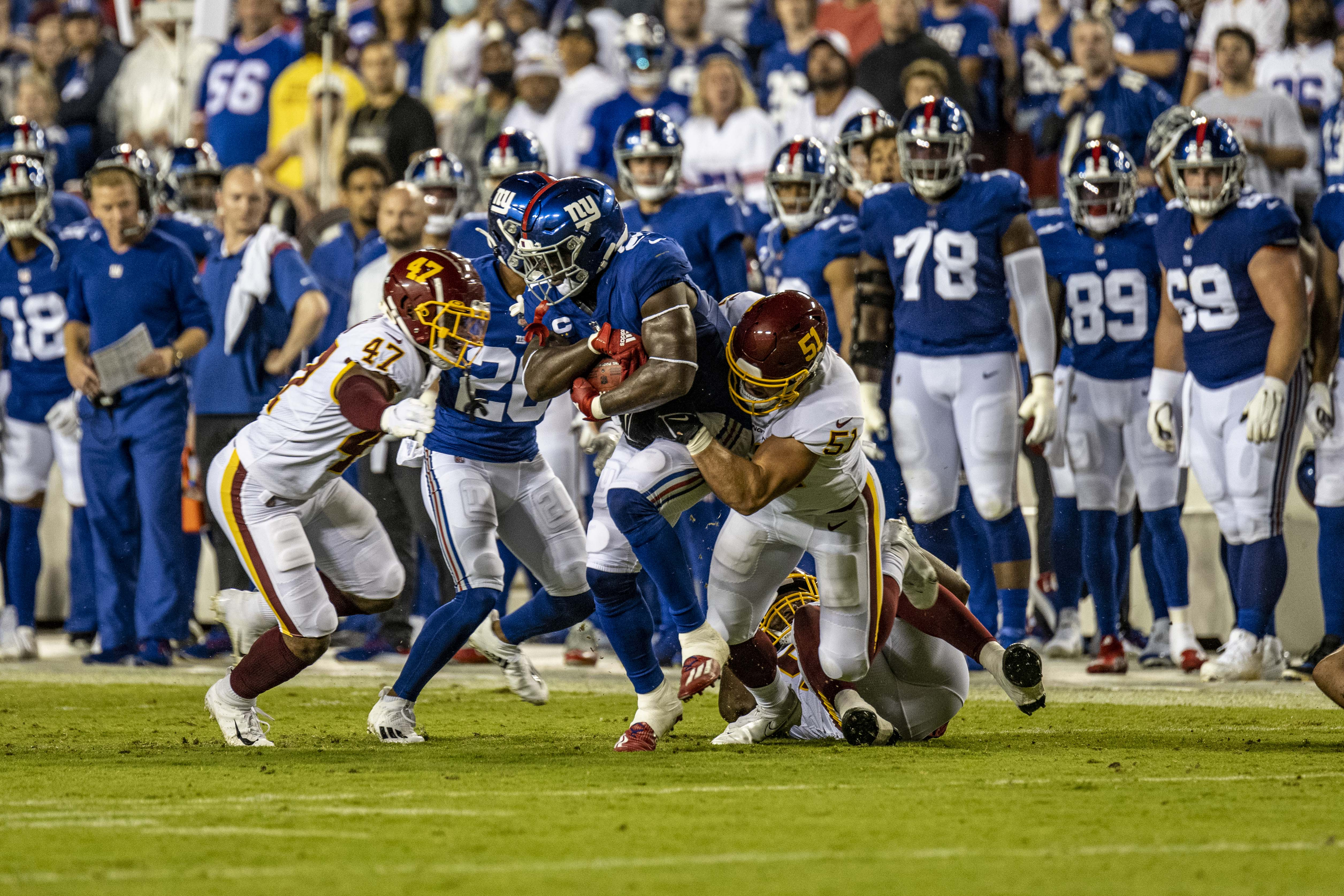
Washington vs. the New York Giants

Week 2: New York Giants at Washington Football Team – Game summary

Quarter	1	2	3	4	Total
Giants	7	3	10	9	**29**
**Football Team**	0	14	3	13	**30**

at FedExField, Landover, Maryland

- Date: September 16
- Game time: 8:20 p.m. EDT
- Game weather: Overcast, 72 °F (22 °C)
- Game attendance: 50,118
- Referee: Scott Novak
- TV announcers (NFLN): Joe Buck, Troy Aikman, Erin Andrews and Kristina Pink
- Recap, Game Book

Game information

**First quarter**

- NYG – Daniel Jones 6-yard run (Graham Gano kick), 7:35. Giants 7–0. **Drive: 11 plays, 79 yards, 5:55.**

**Second quarter**

- WAS – Terry McLaurin 11-yard pass from Taylor Heinicke (Dustin Hopkins kick), 11:16. Tied 7–7. **Drive: 13 plays, 90 yards, 7:01.**
- NYG – Graham Gano 23-yard field goal, 4:09. Giants 10–7. **Drive: 10 plays, 73 yards, 4:09.**
- WAS – J. D. McKissic 2-yard run (Dustin Hopkins kick), 0:21. Football Team 14–10. **Drive: 12 plays, 84 yards, 3:48.**

**Third quarter**

- NYG – Graham Gano 47-yard field goal, 9:07. Football Team 14–13. **Drive: 9 plays, 46 yards, 5:53.**
- NYG – Darius Slayton 33-yard pass from Daniel Jones (Graham Gano kick), 4:41. Giants 20–14. **Drive: 7 plays, 65 yards, 2:50.**
- WAS – Dustin Hopkins 49-yard field goal, 1:30. Giants 20–17. **Drive: 7 plays, 44 yards, 3:11.**

**Fourth quarter**

- NYG – Graham Gano 52-yard field goal, 13:35. Giants 23–17. **Drive: 6 plays, 41 yards, 2:55.**
- WAS – Dustin Hopkins 37-yard field goal, 8:46. Giants 23–20. **Drive: 11 plays, 56 yards, 4:49.**
- NYG – Graham Gano 55-yard field goal, 4:50. Giants 26–20. **Drive: 8 plays, 38 yards, 3:56.**
- WAS – Ricky Seals-Jones 19-yard pass from Taylor Heinicke (Dustin Hopkins kick), 4:33. Football Team 27–26. **Drive: 2 plays, 75 yards, 0:17.**
- NYG – Graham Gano 35-yard field goal, 2:00. Giants 29–27. **Drive: 4 plays, 3 yards, 0:16.**
- WAS – Dustin Hopkins 43-yard field goal, 0:00. Football Team 30–29. **Drive: 11 plays, 50 yards, 2:00.**

**Top passers**

- NYG – Daniel Jones – 22/32, 249 yards, TD
- WAS – Taylor Heinicke – 34/46, 336 yards, 2 TD, INT

**Top rushers**

- NYG – Daniel Jones – 9 rushes, 95 yards, TD
- WAS – Antonio Gibson – 13 rushes, 69 yards

**Top receivers**

- NYG – Sterling Shepard – 9 receptions, 94 yards
- WAS – Terry McLaurin – 11 receptions, 107 yards, TD

A back and forth shootout, Washington capitalized on a late opportunity to escape with a 30-29 win. After Washington took a 14-10 lead into halftime, the Giants scored on their first 4 possessions of the second half to take a 26-20 lead. Washington answered back with a touchdown from Heinicke to Ricky Seals-Jones to take a 27-26 lead, but the Giants capitalized on a late Heinicke interception to take a 29-27 lead. After Washington got into field goal range, Dustin Hopkins missed a 48-yard field goal to win the game. However, the Giants were offside, which nullified the miss and gave Washington one untimed down, since a game cannot end on a defensive penalty. Hopkins made his second attempt from 43 yards to give Washington the win. This was Washington's first win over the Giants since Week 8 of the 2018 season, and improved their record to 1-1 on the season.

==== Week 3: at Buffalo Bills ====
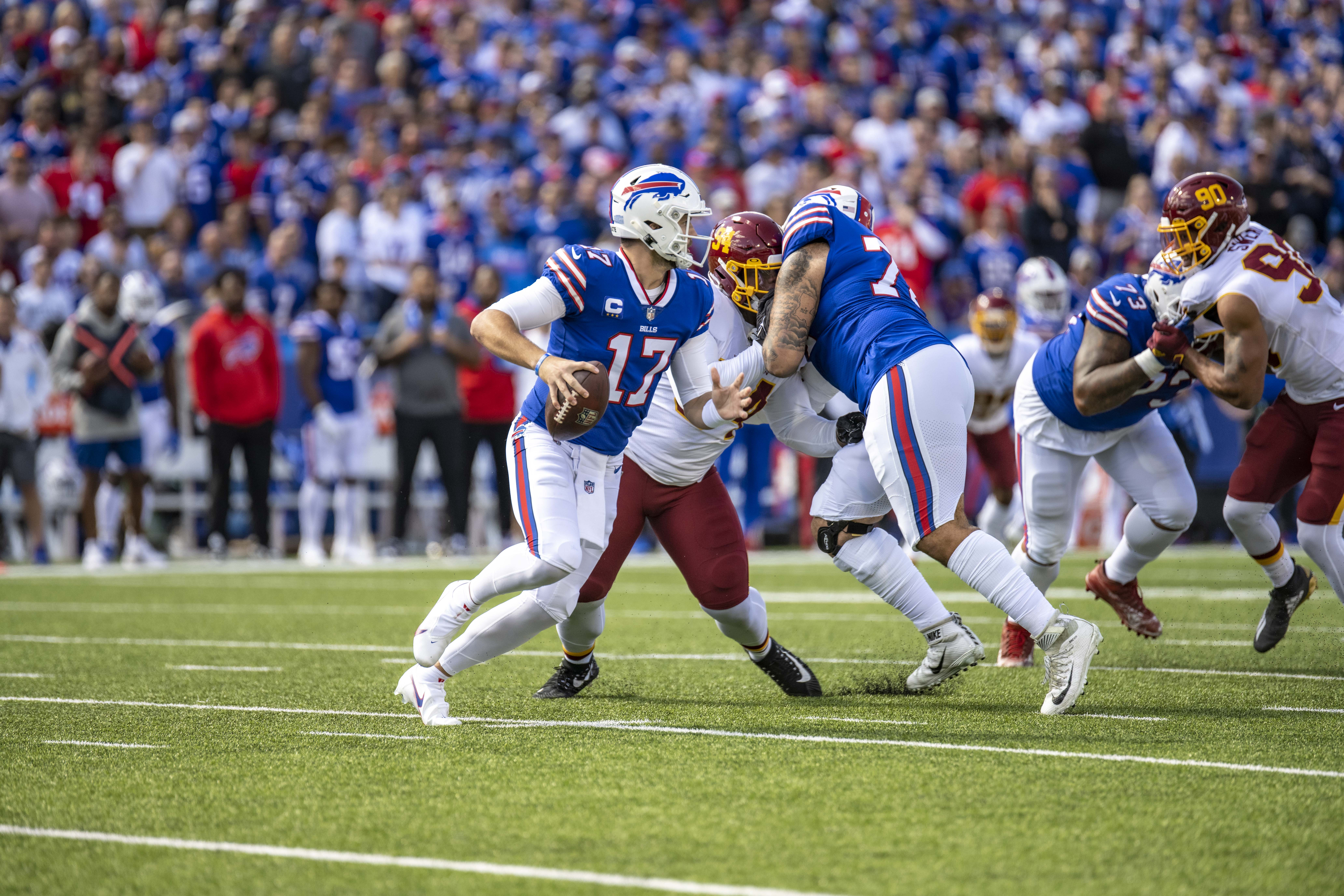
Washington vs. the Buffalo Bills

Week 3: Washington Football Team at Buffalo Bills – Game summary

Quarter	1	2	3	4	Total
Football Team	0	14	0	7	**21**
**Bills**	7	20	9	7	**43**

at Highmark Stadium, Orchard Park, New York

- Date: September 26
- Game time: 1:00 p.m. EDT
- Game weather: Sunny, 66 °F (19 °C)
- Game attendance: 68,434
- Referee: Tony Corrente
- TV announcers (Fox): Chris Myers, Daryl Johnston and Jen Hale
- Recap, Game Book

Game information

**First quarter**

- BUF – Emmanuel Sanders 28-yard pass from Josh Allen (Tyler Bass kick), 10:53. Bills 7–0. **Drive: 8 plays, 75 yards, 4:07.**

**Second quarter**

- BUF – Zack Moss 7-yard pass from Josh Allen (Tyler Bass kick), 12:59. Bills 14–0. **Drive: 8 plays, 52 yards, 4:12.**
- BUF – Dawson Knox 14-yard pass from Josh Allen (Tyler Bass kick), 10:42. Bills 21–0. **Drive: 3 plays, 17 yards, 0:55.**
- WAS – Antonio Gibson 73-yard pass from Taylor Heinicke (Dustin Hopkins kick), 9:51. Bills 21–7. **Drive: 2 plays, 75 yards, 0:51.**
- WAS – Taylor Heinicke 4-yard run (Dustin Hopkins kick), 7:39. Bills 21–14. **Drive: 5 plays, 24 yards, 2:12.**
- BUF – Tyler Bass 21-yard field goal, 1:37. Bills 24–14. **Drive: 7 plays, 55 yards, 1:52.**
- BUF – Tyler Bass 48-yard field goal, 0:00. Bills 27–14. **Drive: 5 plays, 51 yards, 0:26.**

**Third quarter**

- BUF – Emmanuel Sanders 5-yard field pass from Josh Allen (pass failed), 4:43. Bills 33–14. **Drive: 17 plays, 93 yards, 8:17.**
- BUF – Tyler Bass 29-yard field goal, 2:11. Bills 36–14. **Drive: 4 plays, 6 yards, 0:53.**

**Fourth quarter**

- BUF – Josh Allen 2-yard run (Tyler Bass kick), 10:29. Bills 43–14. **Drive: 3 plays, 22 yards, 1:08.**
- WAS – Logan Thomas 2-yard pass from Taylor Heinicke (Dustin Hopkins kick), 5:21. Bills 43–21. **Drive: 10 plays, 75 yards, 5:08.**

**Top passers**

- WAS – Taylor Heinicke – 14/24, 212 yards, 2 TD, 2 INT
- BUF – Josh Allen – 32/43, 358 yards, 4 TD

**Top rushers**

- WAS – Antonio Gibson – 12 rushes, 31 yards
- BUF – Zack Moss – 13 rushes, 60 yards

**Top receivers**

- WAS – Antonio Gibson – 1 reception, 73 yards, TD
- BUF – Cole Beasley – 11 receptions, 98 yards

Buffalo got out to a 21-0 lead early, and Washington was never able to fully recover in a 43-21 loss. Josh Allen threw for 358 yards and four touchdowns, and ran for another in the fourth to give Buffalo a 43-14 lead. The 43 points allowed were the most points the Football Team has allowed under Ron Rivera, and were the most points they had allowed since week 17 of the 2019 season against the Dallas Cowboys (until Week 16 of this season, coincidentally also against Dallas). Washington dropped to 1-2 on the season.

==== Week 4: at Atlanta Falcons ====
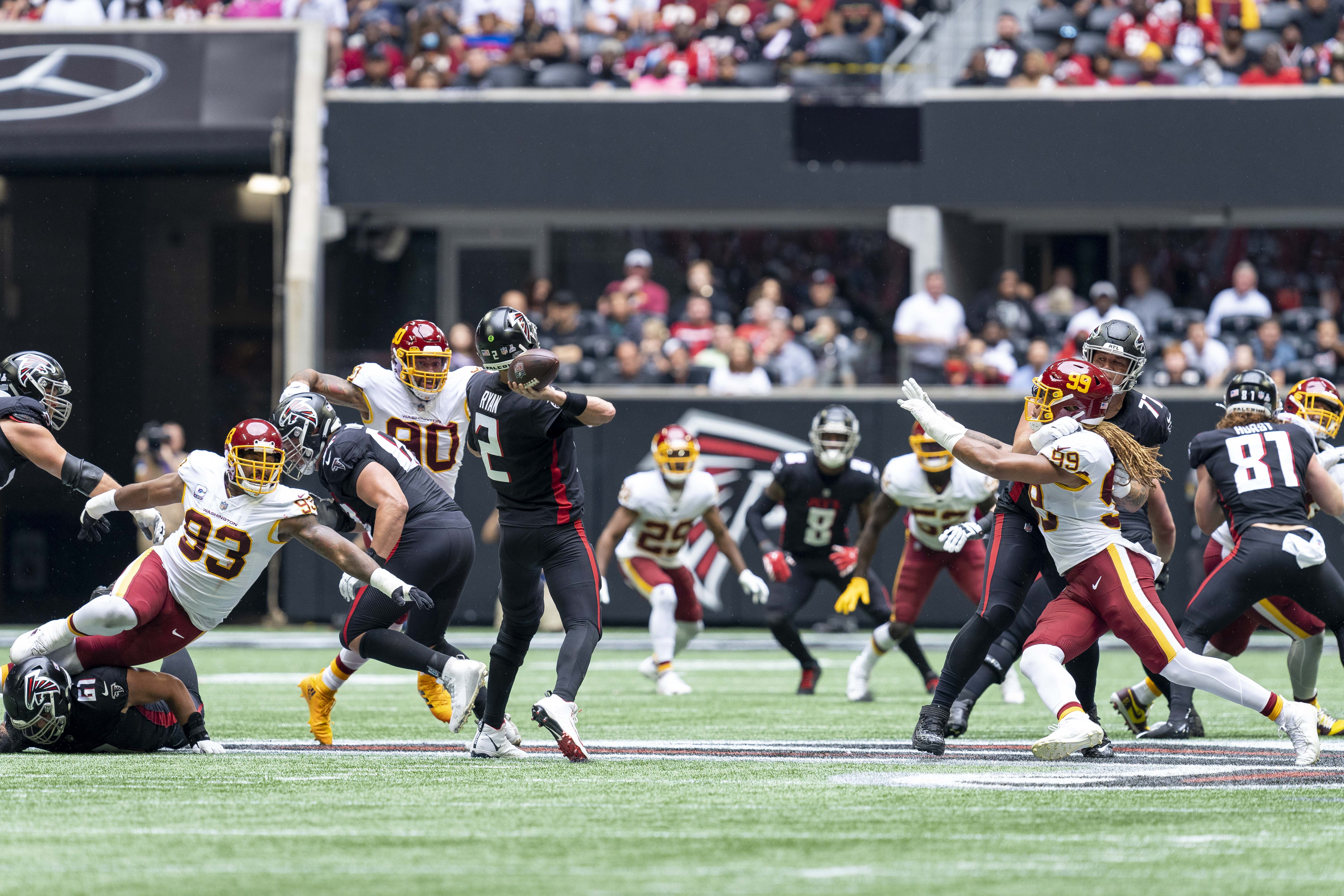
Washington vs. the Atlanta Falcons

Week 4: Washington Football Team at Atlanta Falcons – Game summary

Quarter	1	2	3	4	Total
**Football Team**	0	13	9	12	**34**
Falcons	3	14	6	7	**30**

at Mercedes-Benz Stadium, Atlanta, Georgia

- Date: October 3
- Game time: 1:00 p.m. EDT
- Game weather: Cloudy, 76 °F (24 °C) (retractable roof open)
- Game attendance: 68,333
- Referee: Clay Martin
- TV announcers (Fox): Kevin Kugler, Mark Sanchez, and Laura Okmin
- Recap, Game Book

Game information

**First quarter**

- ATL – Younghoe Koo 25-yard field goal, 7:00. Falcons 3–0. **Drive: 15 plays, 68 yards, 8:00.**

**Second quarter**

- ATL – Cordarrelle Patterson 42-yard pass from Matt Ryan (Younghoe Koo kick), 11:07. Falcons 10–0. **Drive: 4 plays, 64 yards, 2:06.**
- WAS – Terry McLaurin 33-yard pass from Taylor Heinicke (Dustin Hopkins kick), 7:55. Falcons 10–7. **Drive: 7 plays, 77 yards, 3:12.**
- WAS – Antonio Gibson 2-yard run (kick failed), 2:04. Football Team 13–10. **Drive: 7 plays, 63 yards, 4:03.**
- ATL – Cordarrelle Patterson 12-yard pass from Matt Ryan (Younghoe Koo kick), 0:14. Falcons 17–13. **Drive: 11 plays, 75 yards, 1:50.**

**Third quarter**

- WAS – DeAndre Carter 101-yard kickoff return (kick failed), 14:47. Football Team 19–17. **Drive: 0 plays, 0 yards, 0:13.**
- ATL – Cordarrelle Patterson 14-yard pass from Matt Ryan (pass failed), 11:09. Falcons 23–19. **Drive: 8 plays, 68 yards, 3:38.**
- WAS – Dustin Hopkins 21-yard field goal, 5:31. Falcons 23–22. **Drive: 14 plays, 73 yards, 5:38.**

**Fourth quarter**

- ATL – Mike Davis 7-yard pass from Matt Ryan (Younghoe Koo kick), 14:52. Falcons 30–22. **Drive: 13 plays, 83 yards, 5:39.**
- WAS – Terry McLaurin 17-yard pass from Taylor Heinicke (pass failed), 3:52. Football Team 30–28. **Drive: 10 plays, 70 yards, 6:08.**
- WAS – J. D. McKissic 30-yard pass from Taylor Heinicke (run failed), 0:33. Falcons 34–30. **Drive: 7 plays, 76 yards, 1:14.**

**Top passers**

- WAS – Taylor Heinicke – 23/33, 290 yards, 3 TD
- ATL – Matt Ryan – 25/42, 283 yards, 4 TD

**Top rushers**

- WAS – Antonio Gibson – 14 rushes, 63 yards, TD
- ATL – Cordarrelle Patterson – 6 rushes, 34 yards

**Top receivers**

- WAS – Terry McLaurin – 6 receptions, 123 yards, 2 TD
- ATL – Cordarrelle Patterson – 5 receptions, 82 yards, 3 TD

Washington was able to recover from an early 10-0 deficit to defeat the Falcons 34-30 behind 290 yards and 3 touchdowns from Taylor Heinicke. After the 10-0 deficit, Washington scored two touchdowns in the second to take a 13-10 lead. After the Falcons took a 17-13 lead into half, DeAndre Carter returned the second half kickoff 101 yards to give the lead back to Washington. The Falcons took back the lead and then extended it to 30-22 early in the fourth, but Heinicke threw two touchdowns in the final four minutes to give Washington the win. The win improved Washington to 2-2 on the season, and 2-0 in the conference. It was their first win over the Falcons since 2003.

==== Week 5: vs. New Orleans Saints ====
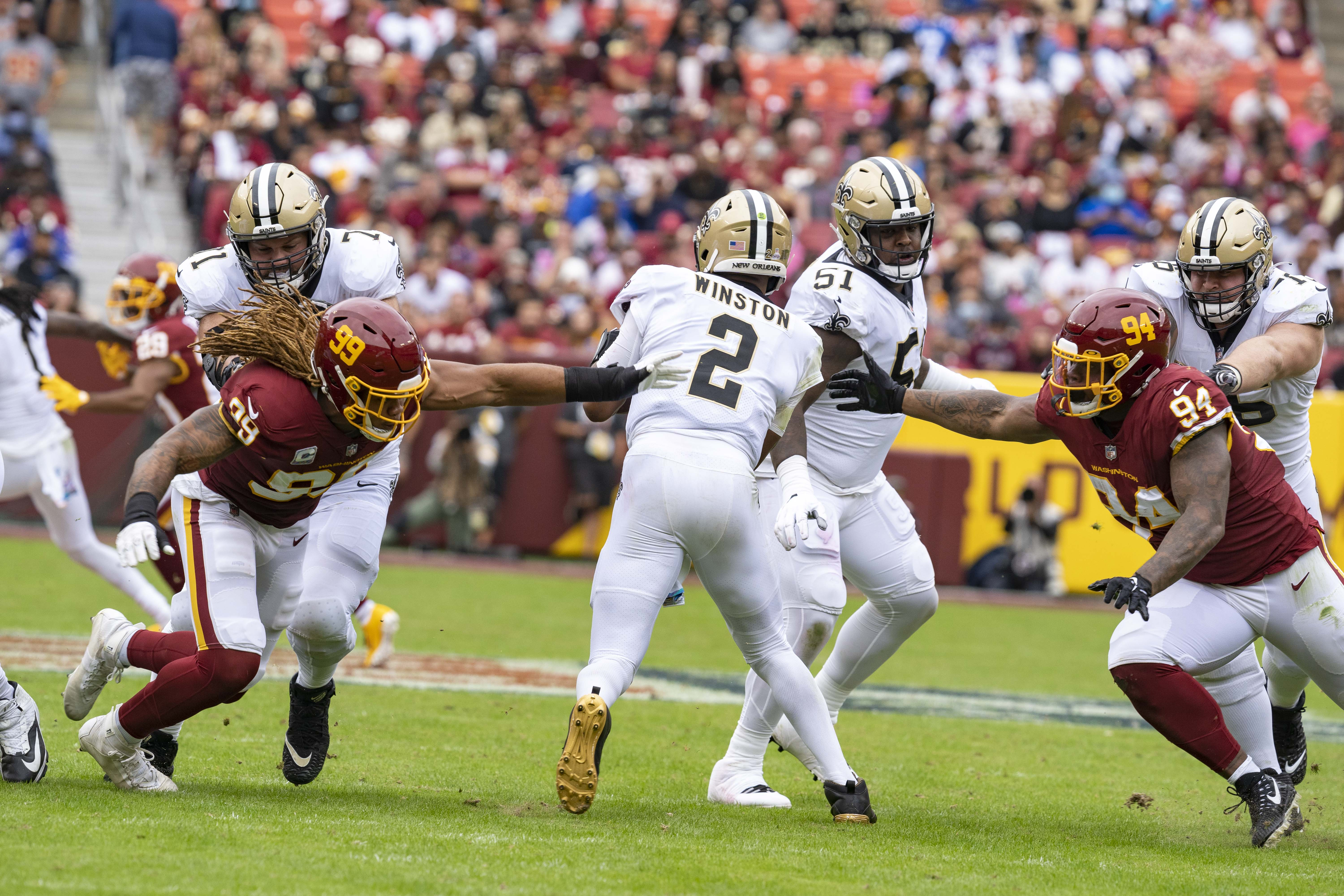
Washington vs. the New Orleans Saints

Week 5: New Orleans Saints at Washington Football Team – Game summary

Quarter	1	2	3	4	Total
**Saints**	7	13	0	13	**33**
Football Team	6	7	3	6	**22**

at FedExField, Landover, Maryland

- Date: October 10
- Game time: 1:00 p.m. EDT
- Game weather: Cloudy, 68 °F (20 °C)
- Game attendance: 50,137
- Referee: Shawn Smith
- TV announcers (CBS): Spero Dedes and Jay Feely
- Recap, Game Book

Game information

**First quarter**

- WAS – Dustin Hopkins 45-yard field goal, 12:27. Football Team 3–0. **Drive: 4 plays, 5 yards, 0:52.**
- NO – Deonte Harris 72-yard pass from Jameis Winston (Cody Parkey kick), 11:13. Saints 7–3. **Drive: 3 plays, 75 yards, 1:14.**
- WAS – Dustin Hopkins 23-yard field goal, 4:55. Saints 7–6. **Drive: 12 plays, 72 yards, 6:18.**

**Second quarter**

- WAS – Antonio Gibson 5-yard run (Dustin Hopkins kick), 14:16. Football Team 13–7. **Drive: 7 plays, 44 yards, 4:11.**
- NO – Alvin Kamara 23-yard run (kick failed), 10:58. Tied 13–13. **Drive: 6 plays, 75 yards, 3:18.**
- NO – Marquez Callaway 49-yard pass from Jameis Winston (Cody Parkey kick), 0:00. Saints 20–13. **Drive: 1 plays, 49 yards, 0:08.**

**Third quarter**

- WAS – Dustin Hopkins 24-yard field goal, 1:53. Saints 20–16. **Drive: 14 plays, 69 yards, 7:20.**

**Fourth quarter**

- NO – Marquez Callaway 12-yard pass from Jameis Winston (Cody Parkey kick), 12:12. Saints 27–16. **Drive: 4 plays, 26 yards, 1:32.**
- WAS – Antonio Gibson 1-yard run (pass failed), 7:51. Saints 27–22. **Drive: 8 plays, 75 yards, 4:21.**
- NO – Alvin Kamara 19-yard pass from Jameis Winston (kick failed), 3:15. Saints 33–22. **Drive: 8 plays, 75 yards, 4:36.**

**Top passers**

- NO – Jameis Winston – 15/30, 279 yards, 4 TD, INT
- WAS – Taylor Heinicke – 20/41, 248 yards, 2 INT

**Top rushers**

- NO – Alvin Kamara – 16 rushes, 71 yards, TD
- WAS – Antonio Gibson – 20 rushes, 60 yards, 2 TD

**Top receivers**

- NO – Marquez Callaway – 4 receptions, 85 yards, 2 TD
- WAS – Adam Humphries – 3 receptions, 73 yards

Washington suffered an 11-point loss to the New Orleans Saints.

==== Week 6: vs. Kansas City Chiefs ====
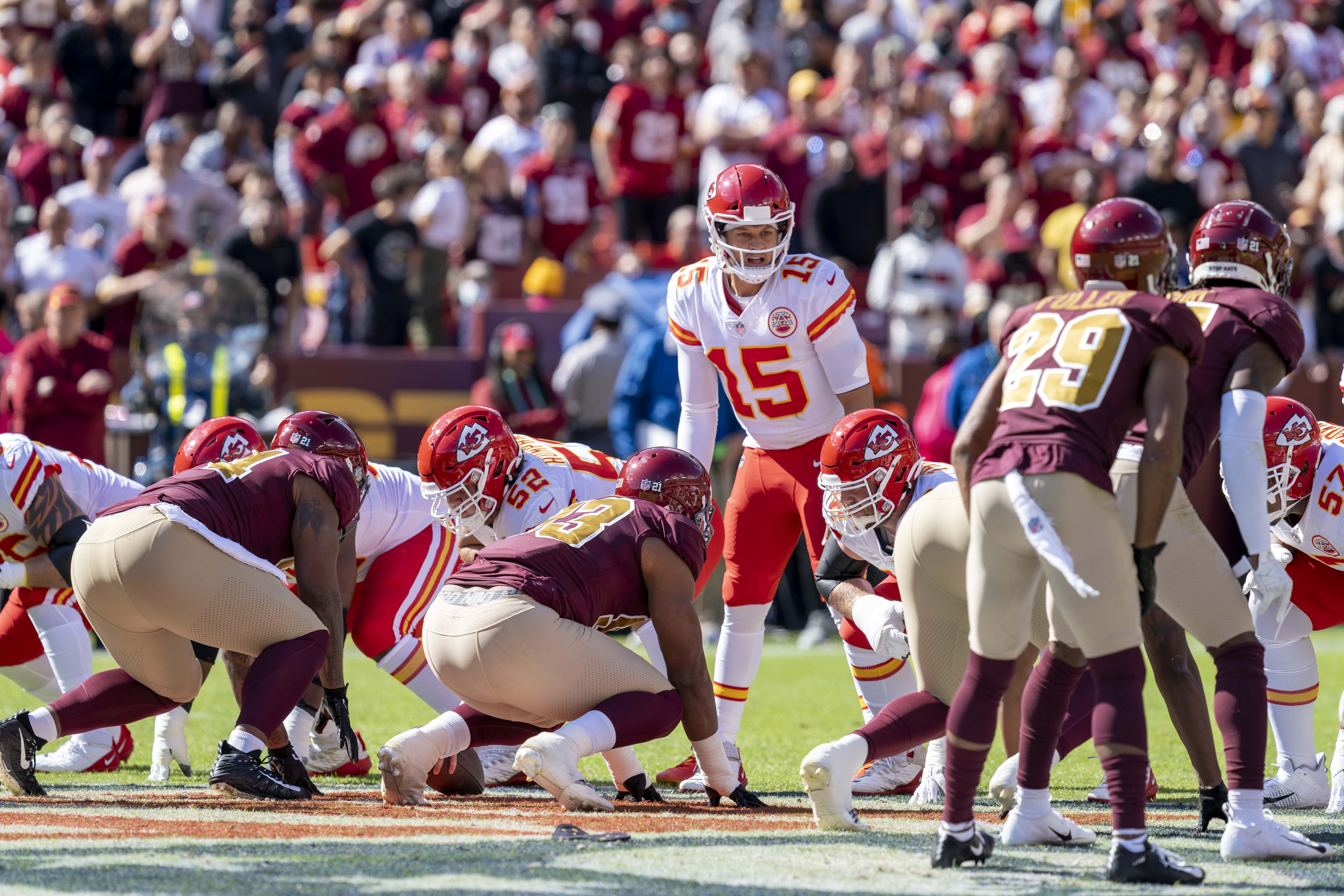
Washington vs. the Kansas City Chiefs

Week 6: Kansas City Chiefs at Washington Football Team – Game summary

Quarter	1	2	3	4	Total
**Chiefs**	7	3	7	14	**31**
Football Team	3	10	0	0	**13**

at FedExField, Landover, Maryland

- Date: October 17
- Game time: 1:00 p.m. EDT
- Game weather: Sunny, 62 °F (17 °C)
- Game attendance: 51,322
- Referee: Adrian Hill
- TV announcers (CBS): Ian Eagle, Charles Davis and Evan Washburn
- Recap, Game Book

Game information

**First quarter**

- KC – Darrel Williams 2-yard run (Harrison Butker kick), 9:09. Chiefs 7–0. **Drive: 10 plays, 95 yards, 4:50.**
- WAS – Dustin Hopkins 50-yard field goal, 3:30. Chiefs 7–3. **Drive: 12 plays, 43 yards, 5:39.**

**Second quarter**

- KC – Harrison Butker 52-yard field goal, 12:33. Chiefs 10–3. **Drive: 4 plays, 7 yards, 1:06.**
- WAS – Dustin Hopkins 43-yard field goal, 8:07. Chiefs 10–6. **Drive: 9 plays, 50 yards, 4:26.**
- WAS – Ricky Seals-Jones 39-yard pass from Taylor Heinicke (Dustin Hopkins kick), 1:18. Football Team 13–10. **Drive: 8 plays, 67 yards, 3:32.**

**Third quarter**

- KC – Tyreek Hill 2-yard pass from Patrick Mahomes (Harrison Butker kick), 4:07. Chiefs 17–13. **Drive: 10 plays, 68 yards, 4:18.**

**Fourth quarter**

- KC – Darrel Williams 3-yard run (Harrison Butker kick), 14:02. Chiefs 24–13. **Drive: 8 plays, 45 yards, 3:36.**
- KC – Demarcus Robinson 24-yard pass from Patrick Mahomes (Harrison Butker kick), 3:14. Chiefs 31–13. **Drive: 15 plays, 96 yards, 7:18.**

**Top passers**

- KC – Patrick Mahomes – 32/47, 397 yards, 2 TD, 2 INT
- WAS – Taylor Heinicke – 24/39, 182 yards, TD, INT

**Top rushers**

- KC – Darrel Williams – 21 rushes, 62 yards, 2 TD
- WAS – J. D. McKissic – 8 rushes, 45 yards

**Top receivers**

- KC – Travis Kelce – 8 receptions, 99 yards
- WAS – J. D. McKissic – 8 receptions, 65 yards

==== Week 7: at Green Bay Packers ====
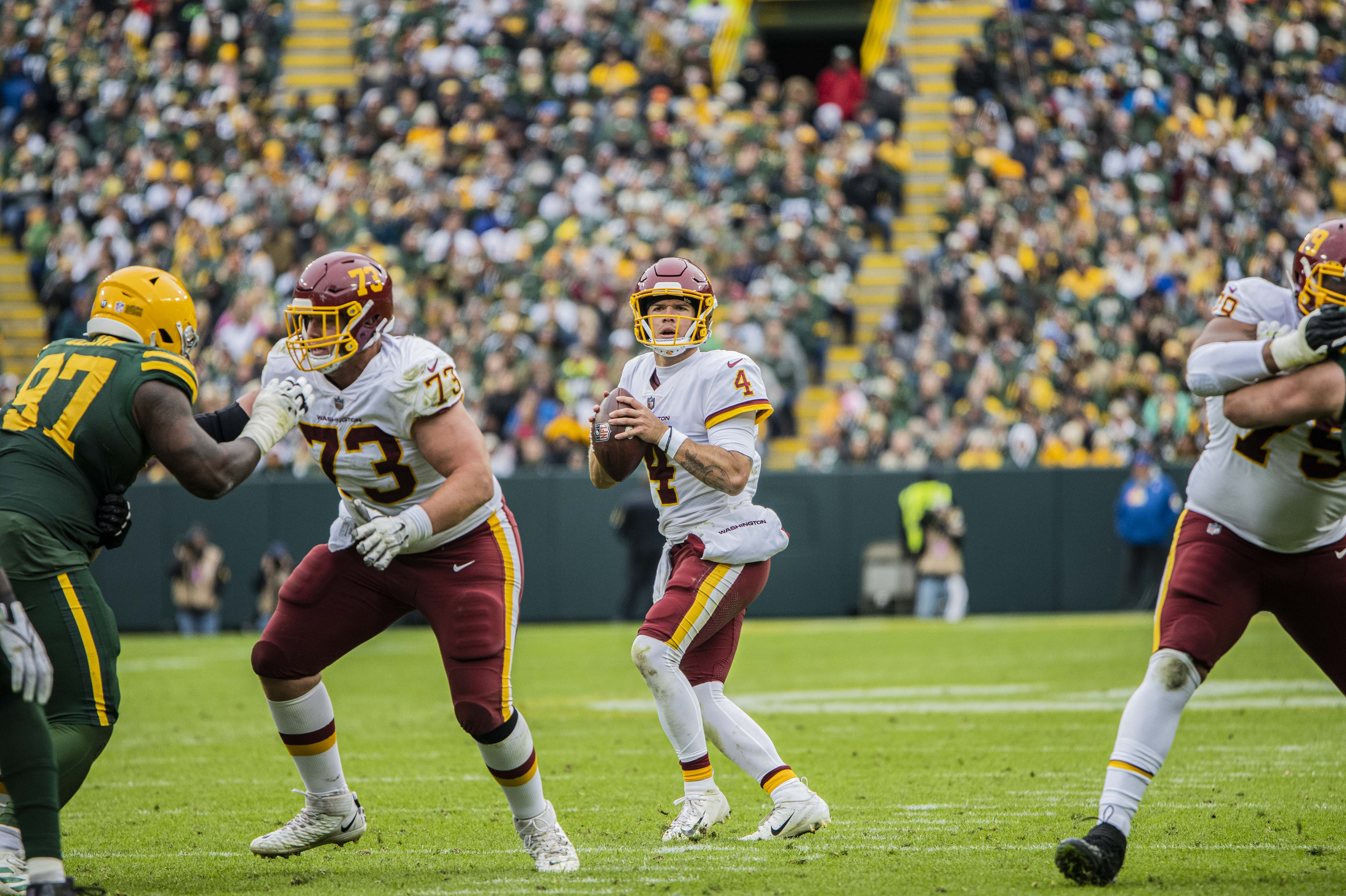
Washington vs. the Green Bay Packers

Week 7: Washington Football Team at Green Bay Packers – Game summary

Quarter	1	2	3	4	Total
Football Team	7	0	0	3	**10**
**Packers**	7	7	7	3	**24**

at Lambeau Field, Green Bay, Wisconsin

- Date: October 24
- Game time: 1:00 p.m. EDT/12:00 p.m. CDT
- Game weather: Sunny, 50 °F (10 °C)
- Game attendance: 78,219
- Referee: Ronald Torbert
- TV announcers (Fox): Joe Davis, Greg Olsen and Pam Oliver
- Recap, Game Book

Game information

**First quarter**

- GB – Davante Adams 17-yard pass from Aaron Rodgers (Mason Crosby kick), 7:11. Packers 7–0. **Drive: 13 plays, 75 yards, 7:49.**
- WAS – Terry McLaurin 40-yard pass from Taylor Heinicke (Chris Blewitt kick), 2:26. Tied 7–7. **Drive: 8 plays, 83 yards, 4:45.**

**Second quarter**

- GB – Allen Lazard 10-yard pass from Aaron Rodgers (Mason Crosby kick), 0:15. Packers 14–7. **Drive: 9 plays, 72 yards, 2:43.**

**Third quarter**

- GB – Robert Tonyan 20-yard pass from Aaron Rodgers (Mason Crosby kick), 12:30. Packers 21–7. **Drive: 3 plays, 27 yards, 1:37.**

**Fourth quarter**

- GB – Mason Crosby 39-yard field goal, 11:22. Packers 24–7. **Drive: 9 plays, 75 yards, 4:43.**
- WAS – Chris Blewitt 34-yard field goal, 2:25. Packers 24–10. **Drive: 6 plays, 11 yards, 3:14.**

**Top passers**

- WAS – Taylor Heinicke – 25/37, 268 yards, TD, INT
- GB – Aaron Rodgers – 27/35, 274 yards, 3 TD

**Top rushers**

- WAS – Taylor Heinicke – 10 rushes, 95 yards
- GB – Aaron Jones – 6 rushes, 19 yards

**Top receivers**

- WAS – Terry McLaurin – 7 receptions, 122 yards, TD
- GB – Davante Adams – 6 receptions, 76 yards, TD

==== Week 8: at Denver Broncos ====
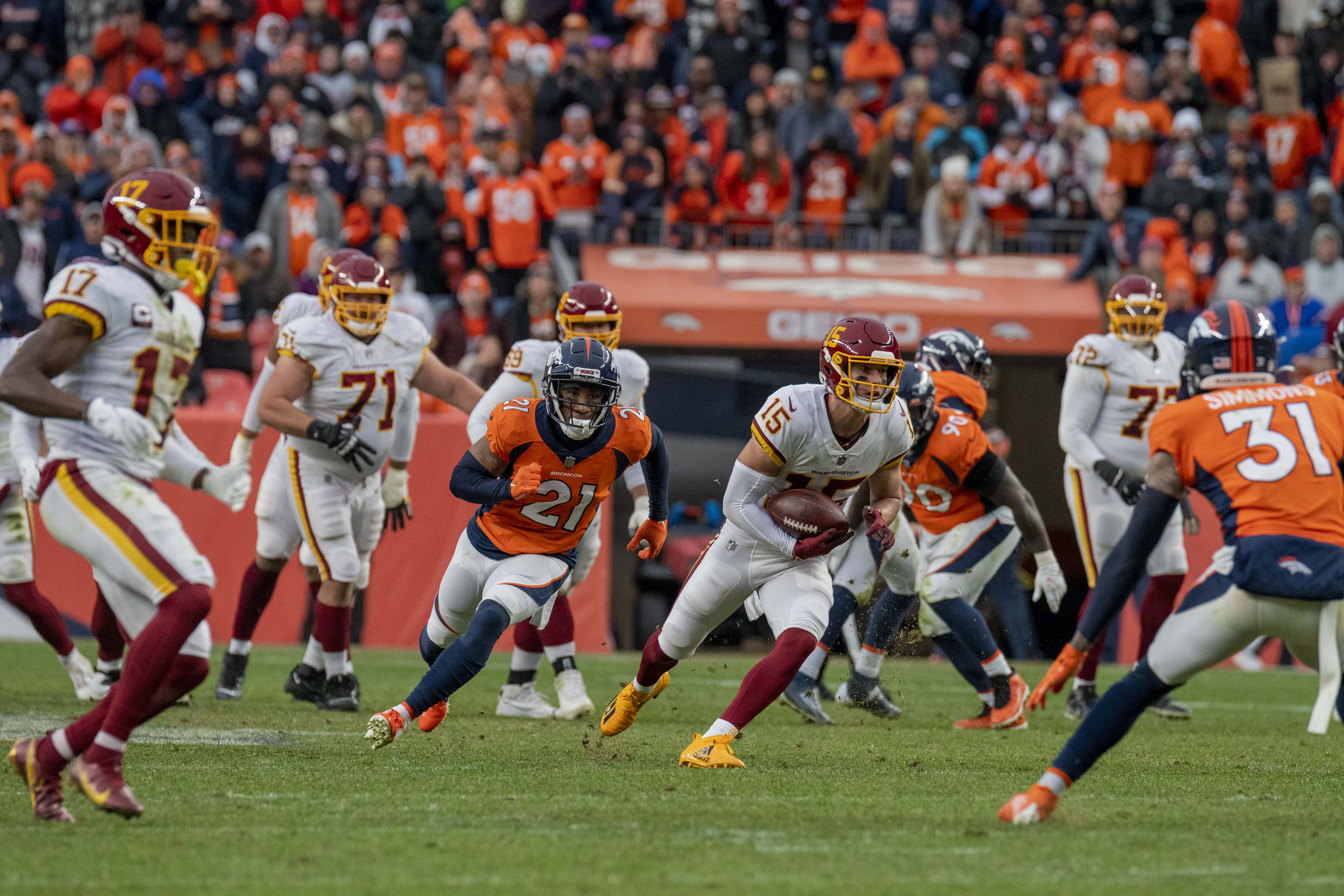
Washington vs. the Denver Broncos

Week 8: Washington Football Team at Denver Broncos – Game summary

Quarter	1	2	3	4	Total
Football Team	0	3	7	0	**10**
**Broncos**	0	10	0	7	**17**

at Empower Field at Mile High, Denver, Colorado

- Date: October 31
- Game time: 4:25 p.m. EDT/2:25 p.m. MDT
- Game weather: Cloudy, 40 °F (4 °C)
- Game attendance: 75,973
- Referee: John Hussey
- TV announcers (Fox): Brandon Gaudin, Mark Schlereth and Shannon Spake
- Recap, Game Book

Game information

**First quarter**

- No scoring plays.

**Second quarter**

- DEN – Brandon McManus 45-yard field goal, 10:27. Broncos 3–0. **Drive: 7 plays, 38 yards, 3:15.**
- WAS – Chris Blewitt 52-yard field goal, 5:25. Tied 3–3. **Drive: 10 plays, 41 yards, 5:02.**
- DEN – Melvin Gordon 15-yard pass from Teddy Bridgewater (Brandon McManus kick), 1:11. Broncos 10–3. **Drive: 7 plays, 75 yards, 4:14.**

**Third quarter**

- WAS – DeAndre Carter 20-yard pass from Taylor Heinicke (Chris Blewitt kick), 0:38. Tied 10–10. **Drive: 10 plays, 94 yards, 6:24.**

**Fourth quarter**

- DEN – Melvin Gordon 7-yard run (Brandon McManus kick), 4:27. Broncos 17–10. **Drive: 8 plays, 63 yards, 4:28.**

**Top passers**

- WAS – Taylor Heinicke – 24/39, 270 yards, TD, 2 INT
- DEN – Teddy Bridgewater – 19/26, 213 yards, TD

**Top rushers**

- KC – Jaret Patterson – 11 rushes, 46 yards
- DEN – Melvin Gordon – 10 rushes, 47 yards, TD

**Top receivers**

- WAS – J. D. McKissic – 8 receptions, 83 yards
- DEN – Tim Patrick – 3 receptions, 64 yards

==== Week 10: vs. Tampa Bay Buccaneers ====
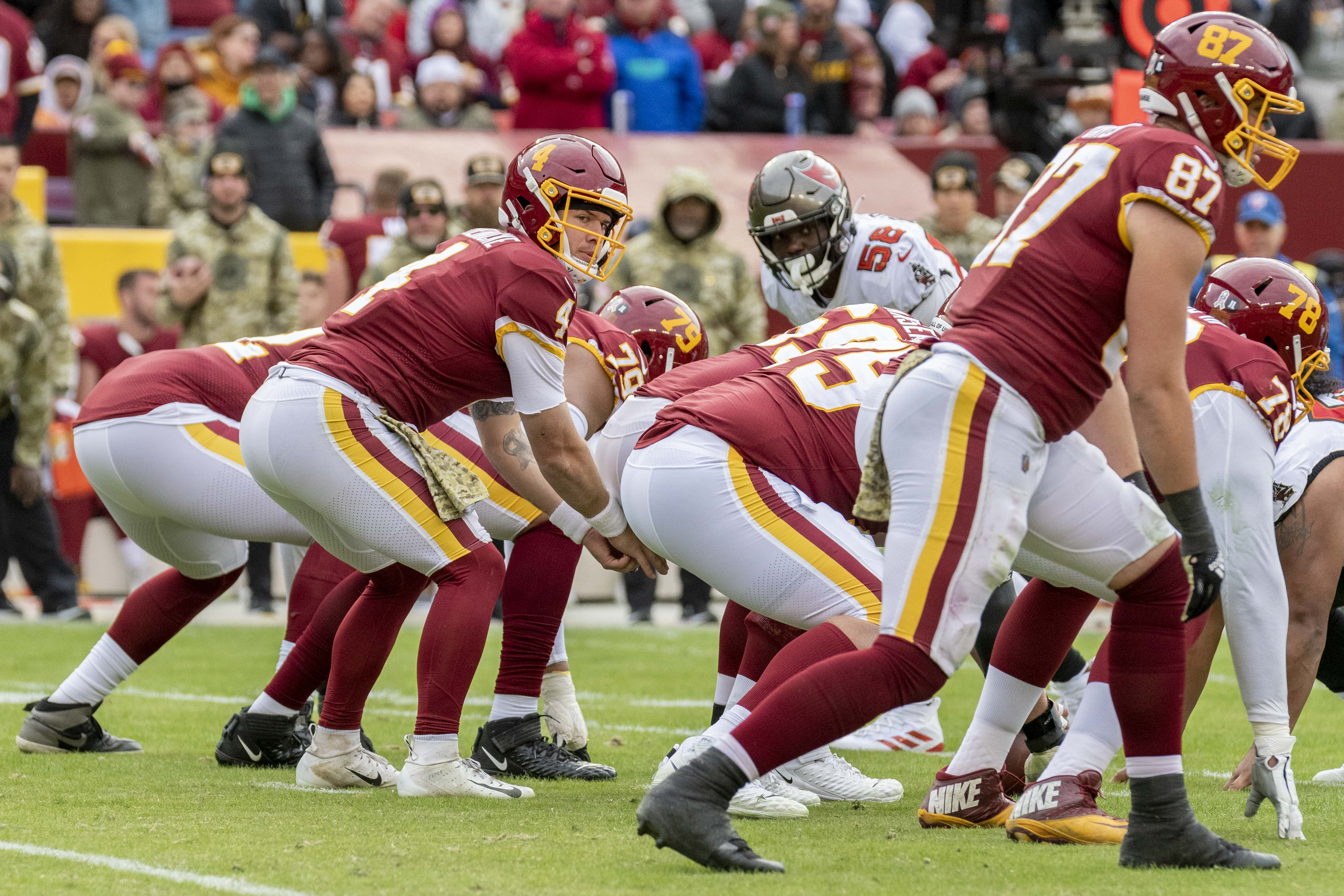
Washington vs. the Tampa Bay Buccaneers

Week 10: Tampa Bay Buccaneers at Washington Football Team – Game summary

Quarter	1	2	3	4	Total
Buccaneers	0	6	7	6	**19**
**Football Team**	6	10	7	6	**29**

at FedExField, Landover, Maryland

- Date: November 14
- Game time: 1:00 p.m. EST
- Game weather: Cloudy, 47 °F (8 °C)
- Game attendance: 52,128
- Referee: Brad Rogers
- TV announcers (Fox): Adam Amin, Mark Schlereth and Shannon Spake
- Recap, Game Book

Game information

**First quarter**

- WAS – Joey Slye 46-yard field goal, 9:57. Football Team 3–0. **Drive: 8 plays, 32 yards, 3:36.**
- WAS – Joey Slye 28-yard field goal, 5:56. Football Team 6–0. **Drive: 7 plays, 18 yards, 3:50.**

**Second quarter**

- WAS – DeAndre Carter 20-yard pass from Taylor Heinicke (Joey Slye kick), 12:21. Football Team 13–0. **Drive: 10 plays, 46 yards, 5:59.**
- TB – Ryan Succop 25-yard field goal, 6:44. Football Team 13–3. **Drive: 13 plays, 68 yards, 5:37.**
- WAS – Joey Slye 29-yard field goal, 0:58. Football Team 16–3. **Drive: 11 plays, 64 yards, 5:46.**
- TB – Ryan Succop 31-yard field goal, 0:00. Football Team 16–6. **Drive: 8 plays, 58 yards, 0:58.**

**Third quarter**

- TB – Cameron Brate 6-yard pass from Tom Brady (Ryan Succop kick), 8:46. Football Team 16–13. **Drive: 4 plays, 43 yards, 2:00.**
- WAS – Antonio Gibson 1-yard run (Joey Slye kick), 4:21. Football Team 23–13. **Drive: 8 plays, 71 yards, 4:25.**

**Fourth quarter**

- TB – Mike Evans 40-yard pass from Tom Brady (kick failed), 10:55. Football Team 23–19. **Drive: 3 plays, 47 yards, 1:32.**
- WAS – Antonio Gibson 1-yard run (run failed), 0:29. Football Team 29–19. **Drive: 19 plays, 80 yards, 10:26.**

**Top passers**

- TB – Tom Brady – 23/34, 220 yards, 2 TD, 2 INT
- WAS – Taylor Heinicke – 26/32, 256 yards, TD

**Top rushers**

- TB – Leonard Fournette – 11 rushes, 47 yards
- WAS – Antonio Gibson – 24 rushes, 64 yards, 2 TD

**Top receivers**

- TB – Mike Evans – 2 receptions, 62 yards, TD
- WAS – Terry McLaurin – 6 reception, 59 yards

In a rematch of their Wild Card matchup from the previous season, Washington upset the Buccaneers 29-19 to end their four-game losing streak. Tom Brady threw two interceptions in the first quarter, which Washington turned into 10 points to take a 13-0 lead early in the second. Tampa cut the lead to 23-19 early in the fourth, but Washington sealed the game with a 10 minute, 19-play touchdown drive. With the win, Washington improved to 3-6 on the season. This was their first victory over Brady since 2003 where they defeated him 20–17 when Brady was still with the Patriots.

==== Week 11: at Carolina Panthers ====
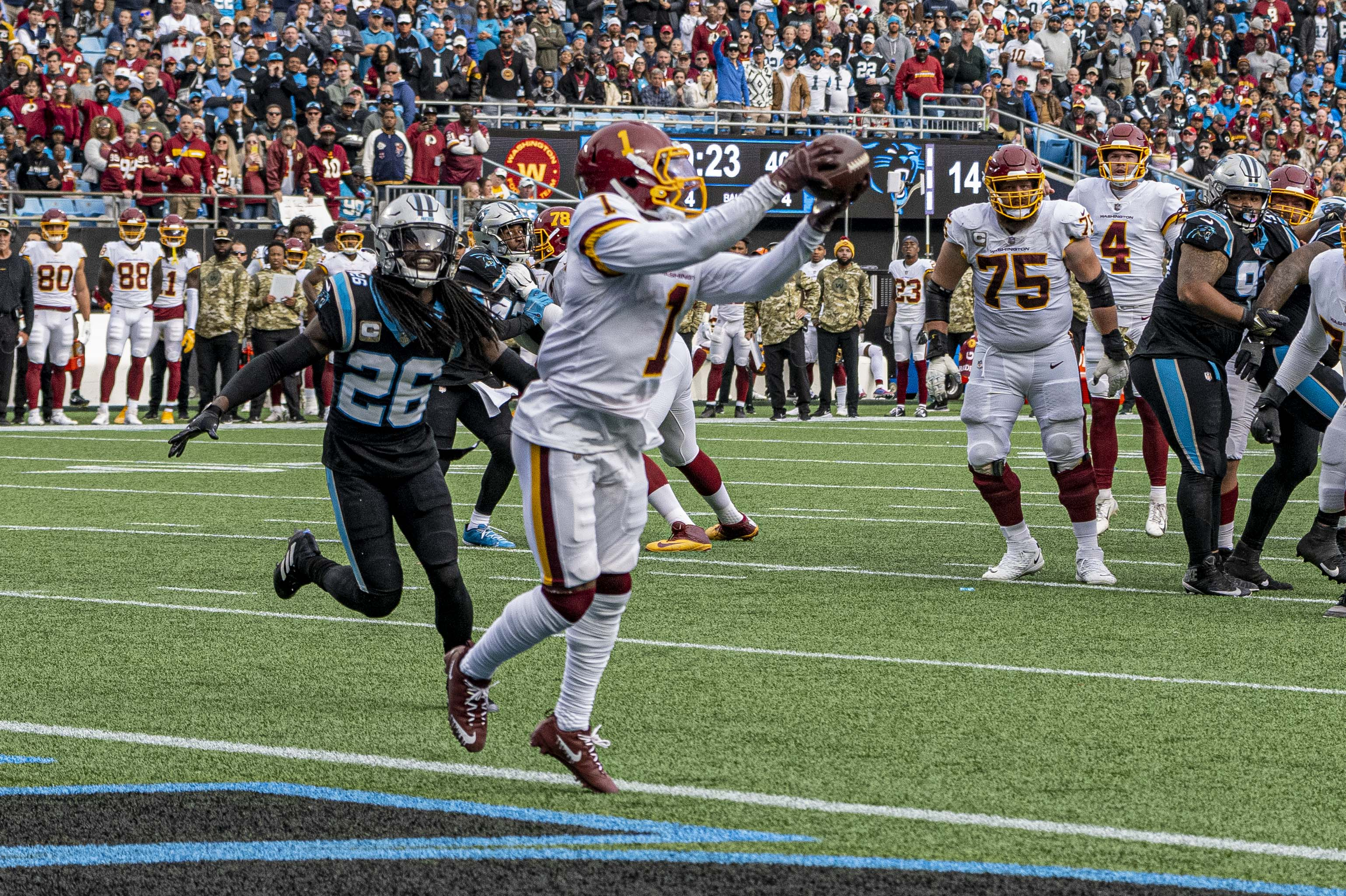
Washington vs. the Carolina Panthers

Week 11: Washington Football Team at Carolina Panthers – Game summary

Quarter	1	2	3	4	Total
**Football Team**	0	14	7	6	**27**
Panthers	7	7	0	7	**21**

at Bank of America Stadium, Charlotte, North Carolina

- Date: November 21
- Game time: 1:00 p.m. EST
- Game weather: Partly cloudy, 58 °F (14 °C)
- Game attendance: 73,350
- Referee: Bill Vinovich
- TV announcers (Fox): Kevin Kugler, Mark Sanchez and Laura Okmin
- Recap, Game Book

Game information

**First quarter**

- CAR – D. J. Moore 10-yard pass from Cam Newton (Zane Gonzalez kick), 9:32. Panthers 7–0. **Drive: 9 plays, 75 yards, 5:28.**

**Second quarter**

- WAS – Cam Sims 6-yard pass from Taylor Heinicke (Joey Slye kick), 13:29. Tied 7–7. **Drive: 7 plays, 66 yards, 2:56.**
- CAR – Cam Newton 24-yard run (Zane Gonzalez kick), 5:52. Panthers 14–7. **Drive: 5 plays, 70 yards, 2:33.**
- WAS – Terry McLaurin 12-yard pass from Taylor Heinicke (Joey Slye kick), 0:09. Tied 14–14. **Drive: 12 plays, 71 yards, 5:43.**

**Third quarter**

- WAS – DeAndre Carter 4-yard pass from Taylor Heinicke (Joey Slye kick), 9:21. Football Team 21–14. **Drive: 10 plays, 66 yards, 5:39.**

**Fourth quarter**

- CAR – Christian McCaffrey 27-yard pass from Cam Newton (Zane Gonzalez kick), 10:44. Tied 21–21. **Drive: 7 plays, 91 yards, 4:09.**
- WAS – Joey Slye 36-yard field goal, 4:13. Football Team 24–21. **Drive: 12 plays, 58 yards, 6:31.**
- WAS – Joey Slye 29-yard field goal, 1:50. Football Team 27–21. **Drive: 5 plays, 23 yards, 1:03.**

**Top passers**

- WAS – Taylor Heinicke – 16/22, 206 yards, 3 TD
- CAR – Cam Newton – 21/27, 189 yards, 2 TD

**Top rushers**

- WAS – Antonio Gibson – 19 rushes, 95 yards
- CAR – Christian McCaffrey – 10 rushes, 59 yards

**Top receivers**

- WAS – Terry McLaurin – 5 receptions, 103 yards, TD
- CAR – Christian McCaffrey – 7 receptions, 60 yards, TD

This was head coach Ron Rivera's first return to Charlotte since his dismissal from the Panthers on December 1, 2019. Rivera previously served as the Panthers head coach from 2011 to 2019, led the team to a franchise-best 15-1 record en route to Super Bowl 50 in the 2015 season, and is the franchise's winningest head coach, having won 76 games with the team. Both teams traded a pair of touchdowns in the first half, with Newton throwing for a touchdown while rushing for another while Taylor Heinicke threw for two touchdowns. Washington took their first lead in the third quarter with Heinicke's throwing a touchdown to DeAndre Carter. After the Panthers tied it early in the fourth quarter, Washington got back-to-back field goals from Joey Slye. The Panthers' last shot to win the game was denied when Cam Newton got sacked on fourth down. With the win, Washington won back-to-back games for the first time in the season and improved to 4-6.

==== Week 12: vs. Seattle Seahawks ====
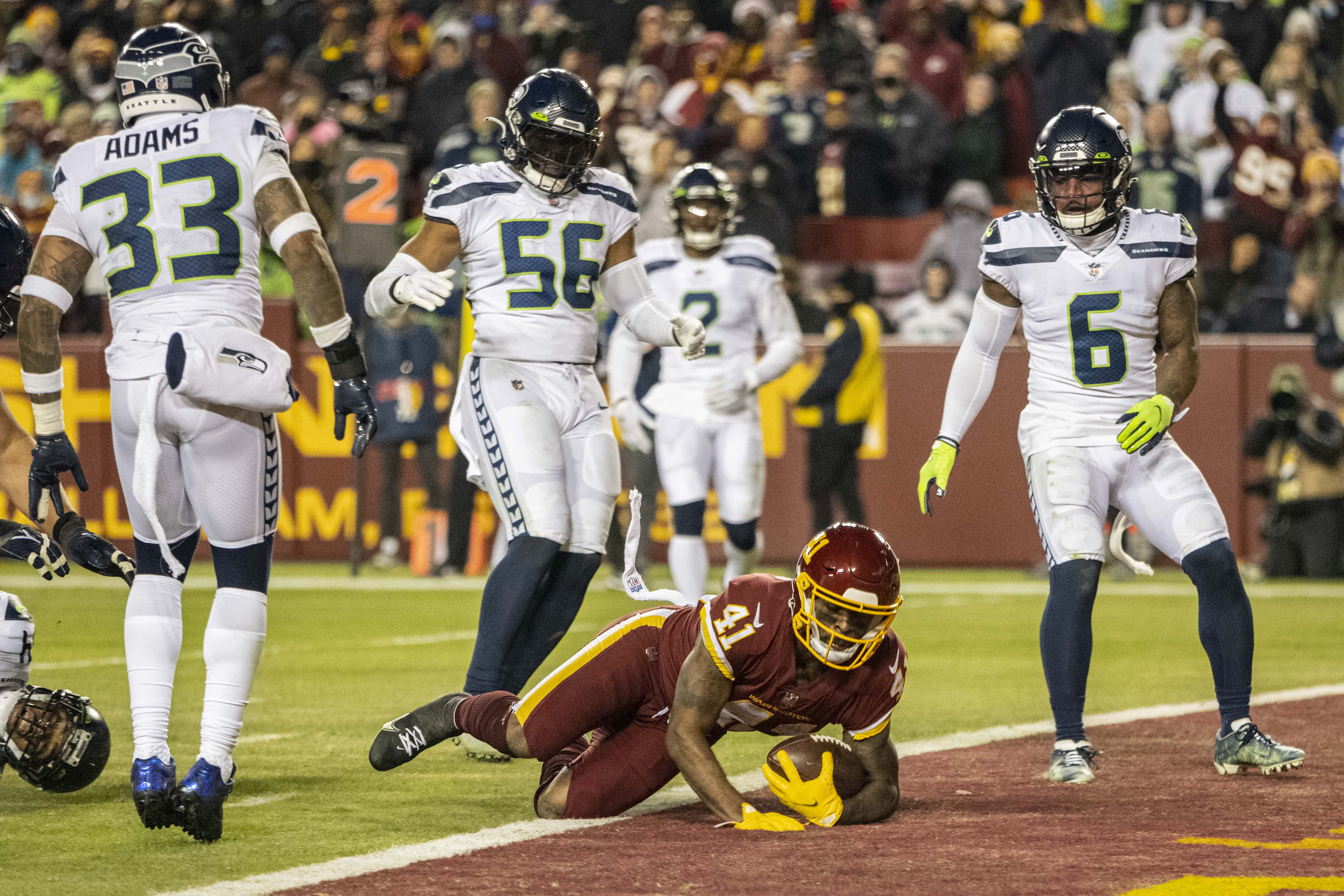
Washington vs. the Seattle Seahawks

Week 12: Seattle Seahawks at Washington Football Team – Game summary

Quarter	1	2	3	4	Total
Seahawks	7	2	0	6	**15**
**Football Team**	3	6	8	0	**17**

at FedExField, Landover, Maryland

- Date: November 29
- Game time: 8:15 p.m. EST
- Game weather: Cloudy, 38 °F (3 °C)
- Game attendance: 52,680
- Referee: Clay Martin
- TV announcers (ESPN): Steve Levy, Brian Griese, Louis Riddick, Lisa Salters and John Parry
- Preview, Game Book

Game information

**First quarter**

- WAS – Joey Slye 23-yard field goal, 2:59. Football Team 3–0. **Drive: 15 plays, 68 yards, 9:25.**
- SEA – Gerald Everett 6-yard pass from Russell Wilson (Jason Myers kick), 0:20. Seahawks 7–3. **Drive: 6 plays, 75 yards, 2:39.**

**Second quarter**

- WAS – J. D. McKissic 10-yard pass from Taylor Heinicke, 0:56. Football Team 9–7. **Drive: 9 plays, 73 yards, 2:56.**
- SEA – Rasheem Green defensive two point conversion, 0:56. Tied 9–9.

**Third quarter**

- WAS – J. D. McKissic 10-yard run (Antonio Gibson run), 8:30. Football Team 17–9. **Drive: 11 plays, 73 yards, 4:56.**

**Fourth quarter**

- SEA – Freddie Swain 32-yard pass from Russell Wilson (pass failed), 0:15. Football Team 17–15. **Drive: 10 plays, 96 yards, 2:04.**

**Top passers**

- SEA – Russell Wilson – 20/31, 247 yards, 2 TD
- WAS – Taylor Heinicke – 27/35, 223 yards, TD, INT

**Top rushers**

- SEA – Russell Wilson – 2 rushes, 16 yards
- WAS – Antonio Gibson – 29 rushes, 111 yards

**Top receivers**

- SEA – Tyler Lockett – 3 receptions, 96 yards
- WAS – Terry McLaurin – 4 receptions, 51 yards

Washington hosted the 3–7 Seahawks with both teams needing a win to stay relevant in the NFC playoff picture. Washington kicker Joey Slye was injured on a blocked extra point that was returned for a defensive 2-point conversion by Seahawks defensive tackle Rasheem Green. A touchdown pass late in the 4th quarter on 4th and goal from Heinicke to Logan Thomas was overturned, giving Seattle a chance down 8; while Wilson hit Freddie Swain for a score with 15 seconds left, Kendall Fuller intercepted the 2-point pass to keep Washington with a 17–15 lead. Initially, Seattle appeared to recover an onside kick, but the play was called back due to an illegal formation, and Washington was able to recover the subsequent onside kick attempt to seal the victory and improve to 5–6. It was their first Monday Night Football victory since 2014. This was also Washington's final home win under the transitional "Football Team" moniker, as they completed their rebrand and chose the Commanders name in 2022.

==== Week 13: at Las Vegas Raiders ====
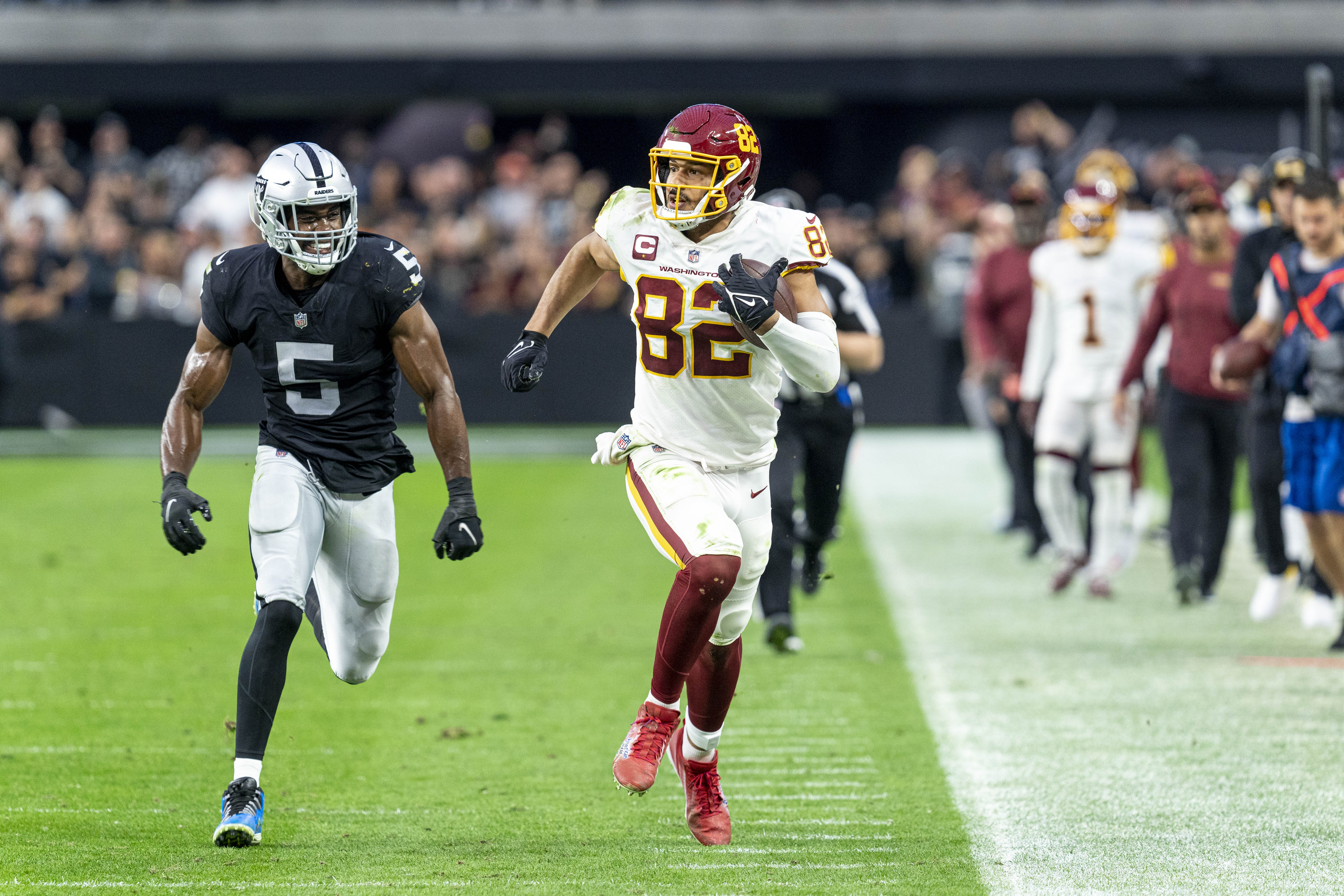
Washington vs. the Las Vegas Raiders

Week 13: Washington Football Team at Las Vegas Raiders – Game summary

Quarter	1	2	3	4	Total
**Football Team**	7	0	0	10	**17**
Raiders	0	3	3	9	**15**

at Allegiant Stadium, Paradise, Nevada

- Date: December 5
- Game time: 4:05 p.m. EST/1:05 p.m. PST
- Game weather: None (indoor stadium)
- Game attendance: 61,607
- Referee: Adrian Hill
- TV announcers (Fox): Kevin Burkhardt, Greg Olsen and Pam Oliver
- Recap, Game Book

Game information

**First quarter**

- WAS – Logan Thomas 7-yard pass from Taylor Heinicke (Brian Johnson kick), 9:39. Football Team 7–0. **Drive: 9 plays, 75 yards, 5:21.**

**Second quarter**

- LV – Daniel Carlson 52-yard field goal, 0:04. Football Team 7–3. **Drive: 10 plays, 46 yards, 1:37.**

**Third quarter**

- LV – Daniel Carlson 38-yard field goal, 4:52. Football Team 7–6. **Drive: 8 plays, 71 yards, 3:26.**

**Fourth quarter**

- WAS – Antonio Gibson 4-yard pass from Taylor Heinicke (Brian Johnson kick), 13:28. Football Team 14–6. **Drive: 9 plays, 75 yards, 6:24.**
- LV – Josh Jacobs 1-yard run (pass failed), 10:57. Football Team 14–12. **Drive: 5 plays, 75 yards, 2:31.**
- LV – Daniel Carlson 37-yard field goal, 2:22. Raiders 15–14. **Drive: 8 plays, 43 yards, 4:27.**
- WAS – Brian Johnson 48-yard field goal, 0:37. Football Team 17–15. **Drive: 8 plays, 44 yards, 1:45.**

**Top passers**

- WAS – Taylor Heinicke – 23/30, 196 yards, 2 TD, INT
- LV – Derek Carr – 28/38, 249 yards

**Top rushers**

- WAS – Antonio Gibson – 23 rushes, 88 yards
- LV – Josh Jacobs – 13 rushes, 52 yards, TD

**Top receivers**

- WAS – Logan Thomas – 3 receptions, 48 yards, TD
- LV – Hunter Renfrow – 9 receptions, 102 yards

==== Week 14: vs. Dallas Cowboys ====
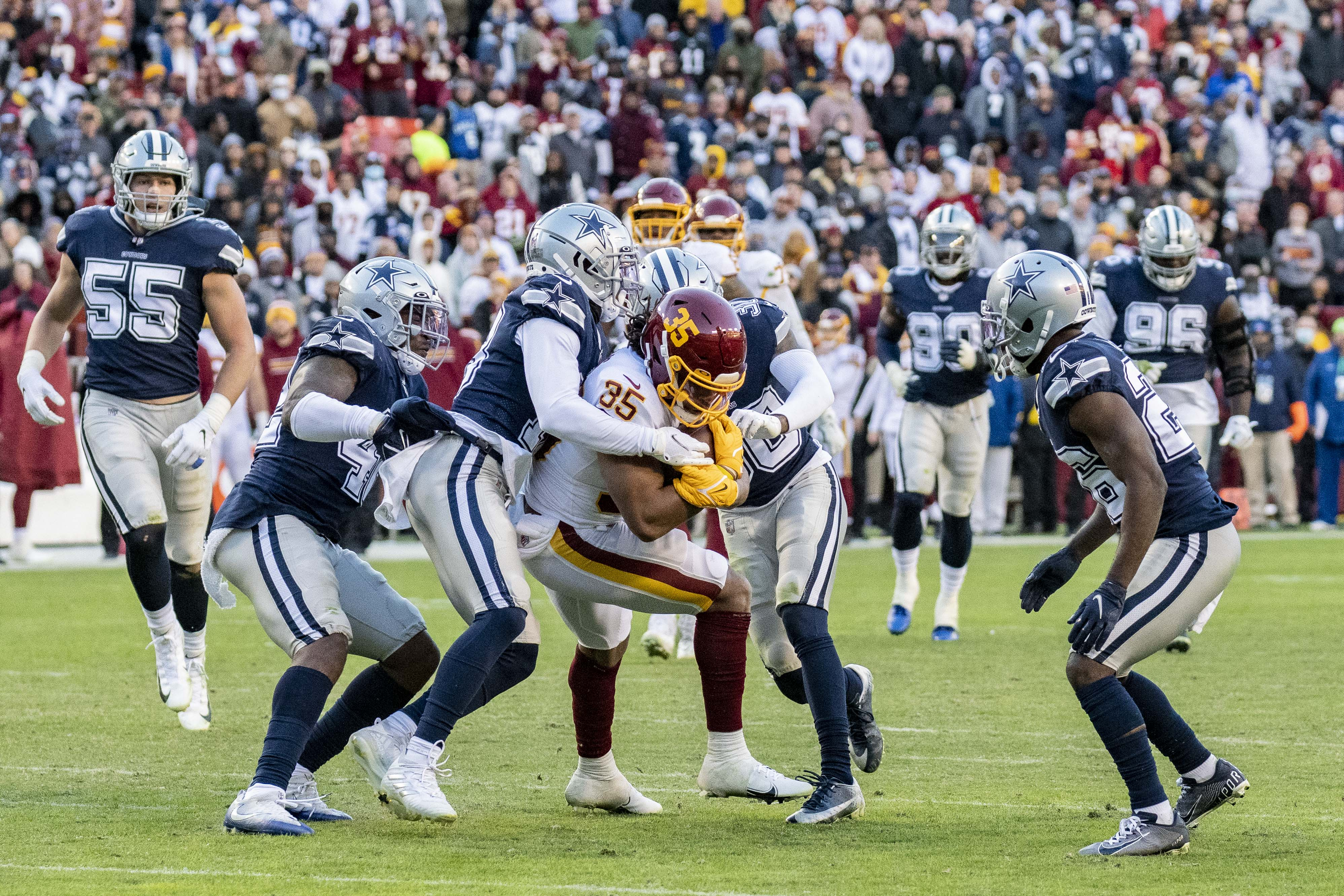
Washington vs. the Dallas Cowboys

Week 14: Dallas Cowboys at Washington Football Team – Game summary

Quarter	1	2	3	4	Total
**Cowboys**	18	6	3	0	**27**
Football Team	0	0	8	12	**20**

at FedExField, Landover, Maryland

- Date: December 12
- Game time: 1:00 p.m. EST
- Game weather: Sunny, 48 °F (9 °C)
- Game attendance: 61,308
- Referee: Alex Kemp
- TV announcers (Fox): Kevin Burkhardt, Greg Olsen and Pam Oliver
- Recap, GameBook

Game information

**First quarter**

- DAL – Greg Zuerlein 35-yard field goal, 9:37. Cowboys 3–0. **Drive: 12 plays, 54 yards, 5:23.**
- DAL – Amari Cooper 7-yard pass from Dak Prescott (Ezekiel Elliott run), 3:42. Cowboys 11–0. **Drive: 5 plays, 41 yards, 1:44.**
- DAL – Dorance Armstrong 37-yard fumble return (Greg Zuerlein kick), 0:29. Cowboys 18–0.

**Second quarter**

- DAL – Greg Zuerlein 38-yard field goal, 4:58. Cowboys 21–0. **Drive: 11 plays, 61 yards, 5:23.**
- DAL – Greg Zuerlein 37-yard field goal, 0:15. Cowboys 24–0. **Drive: 12 plays, 58 yards, 1:59.**

**Third quarter**

- WAS – Cam Sims 43-yard pass from Taylor Heinicke (Taylor Heinicke run), 6:57. Cowboys 24–8. **Drive: 6 plays, 90 yards, 2:20.**
- DAL – Greg Zuerlein 29-yard field goal, 1:35. Cowboys 27–8. **Drive: 5 plays, 15 yards, 1:37.**

**Fourth quarter**

- WAS – Jonathan Williams 1-yard run (pass failed), 5:09. Cowboys 27–14. **Drive: 13 plays, 73 yards, 4:15.**
- WAS – Cole Holcomb 31-yard interception return (kick blocked), 4:13. Cowboys 27–20.

**Top passers**

- DAL – Dak Prescott – 22/39, 211 yards, TD, 2 INT
- WAS – Taylor Heinicke – 11/25, 122 yards, TD, INT

**Top rushers**

- DAL – Ezekiel Elliott – 12 rushes, 45 yards
- WAS – Antonio Gibson – 10 rushes, 36 yards

**Top receivers**

- DAL – CeeDee Lamb – 7 receptions, 61 yards
- WAS – Cam Sims – 3 receptions, 69 yards, TD

==== Week 15: at Philadelphia Eagles ====
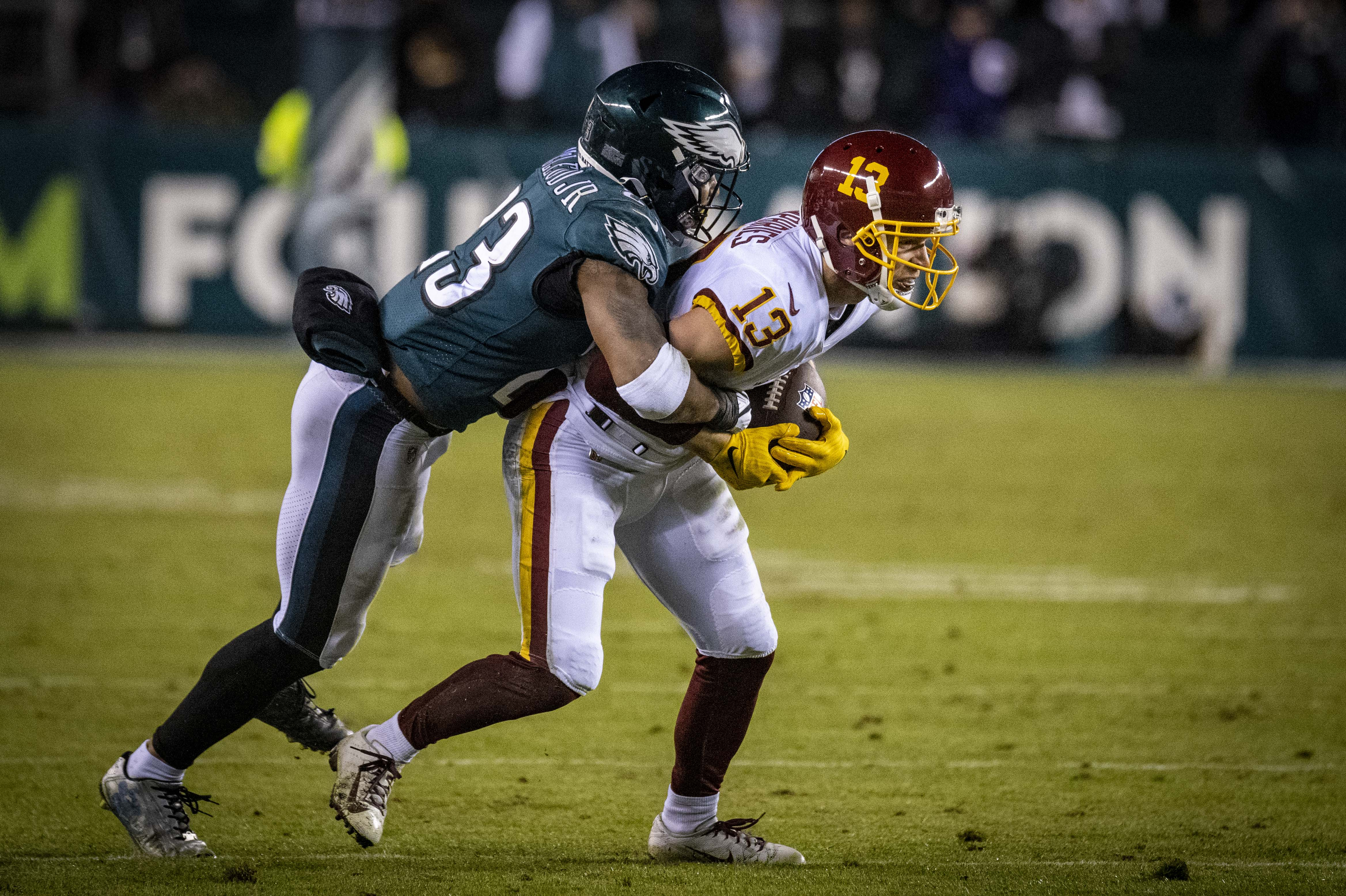
Washington vs. the Philadelphia Eagles

Week 15: Washington Football Team at Philadelphia Eagles – Game summary

Quarter	1	2	3	4	Total
Football Team	10	0	0	7	**17**
**Eagles**	0	10	10	7	**27**

at Lincoln Financial Field, Philadelphia, Pennsylvania

- Date: December 21
- Game time: 7:00 p.m. EST
- Game weather: Cloudy, 38 °F (3 °C)
- Game attendance: 69,796
- Referee: Tony Corrente
- TV announcers (Fox): Kevin Kugler, Mark Sanchez and Laura Okmin
- Recap, Game Book

Game information

**First quarter**

- WAS – Antonio Gibson 1-yard run (Brian Johnson kick), 8:15. Football Team 7–0 **Drive: 7 plays, 26 yards, 3:14.**
- WAS – Brian Johnson 22-yard field goal, 2:47. Football Team 10–0 **Drive: 5 plays, 49 yards, 1:38.**

**Second quarter**

- PHI – Jake Elliott 20-yard field goal, 8:07. Football Team 10–3 **Drive: 8 plays, 75 yards, 3:23.**
- PHI – Jalen Hurts 1-yard run (Jake Elliott kick), 1:29. Tied 10–10 **Drive: 11 plays, 77 yards, 4:50.**

**Third quarter**

- PHI – Jalen Hurts 1-yard run (Jake Elliott kick), 12:26. Eagles 17–10 **Drive: 6 plays, 75 yards, 2:34.**
- PHI – Jake Elliott 37-yard field goal, 0:18. Eagles 20–10 **Drive: 10 plays, 44 yards, 5:53.**

**Fourth quarter**

- WAS – Jaret Patterson 1-yard run (Brian Johnson kick), 11:44. Eagles 20–17 **Drive: 7 plays, 69 yards, 3:34.**
- PHI – Greg Ward 19-yard pass from Jalen Hurts (Jake Elliott kick), 7:46. Eagles 27–17 **Drive: 8 plays, 80 yards, 3:58.**

**Top passers**

- WAS – Garrett Gilbert – 20/31, 194 yards
- PHI – Jalen Hurts – 20/26, 296 yards, TD, INT

**Top rushers**

- WAS – Antonio Gibson – 15 rushes, 26 yards, TD
- PHI – Miles Sanders – 18 rushes, 131 yards

**Top receivers**

- WAS – Terry McLaurin – 2 receptions, 51 yards
- PHI – Dallas Goedert – 7 receptions, 135 yards

==== Week 16: at Dallas Cowboys ====
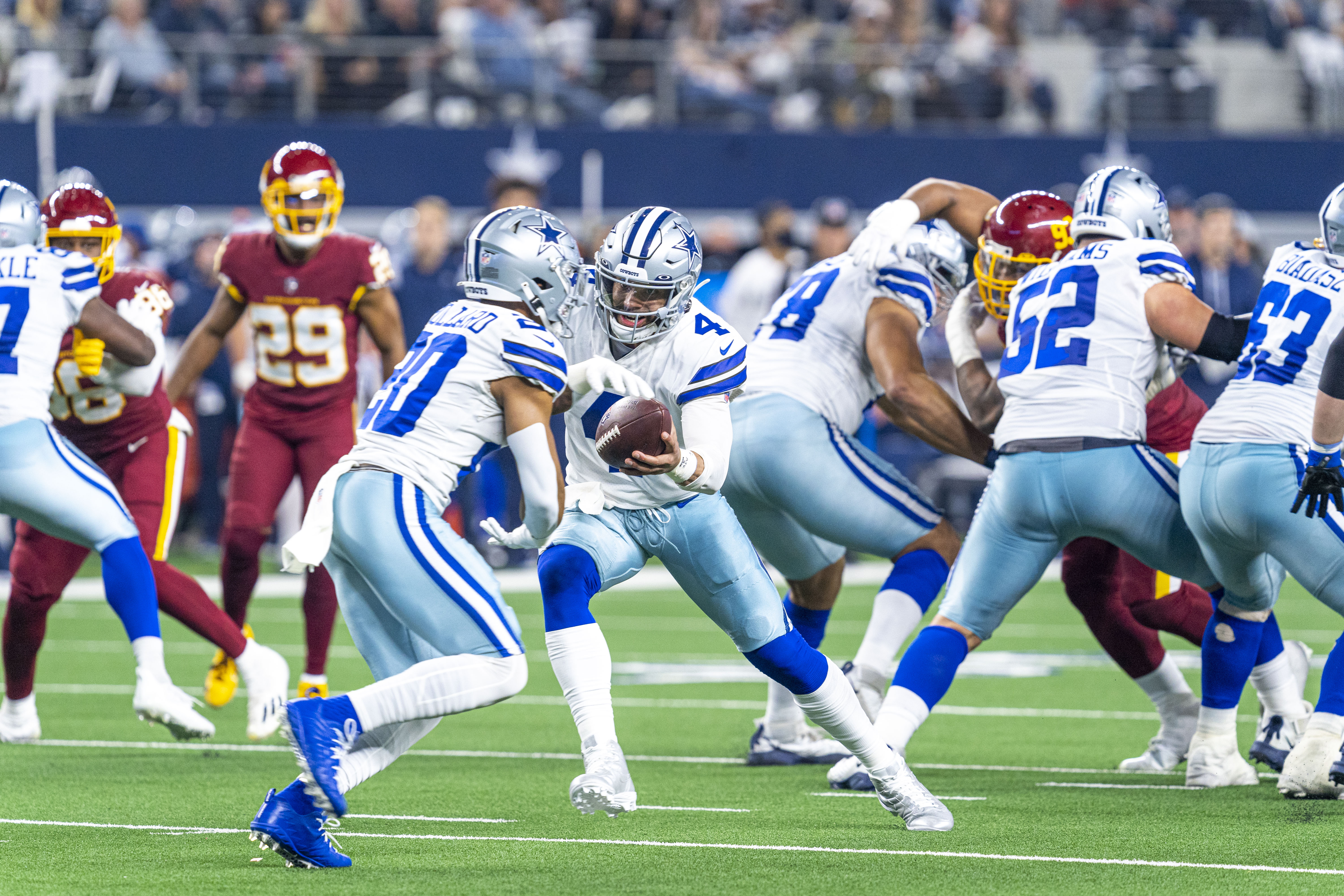
Washington vs. the Dallas Cowboys

Week 16: Washington Football Team at Dallas Cowboys – Game summary

Quarter	1	2	3	4	Total
Football Team	0	7	0	7	**14**
**Cowboys**	21	21	7	7	**56**

at AT&T Stadium, Arlington, Texas

- Date: December 26
- Game time: 8:20 p.m. EST/7:20 p.m. CST
- Game weather: None (retractable roof closed)
- Game attendance: 93,482
- Referee: Bill Vinovich
- TV announcers (NBC): Al Michaels, Cris Collinsworth, Michele Tafoya and Terry McAulay
- Recap, Game Book

Game information

**First quarter**

- DAL – Ezekiel Elliott 5-yard pass from Dak Prescott (Greg Zuerlein kick), 7:42. Cowboys 7–0. **Drive: 9 plays, 71 yards, 3:45.**
- DAL – Dalton Schultz 9-yard pass from Dak Prescott (Greg Zuerlein kick), 3:08. Cowboys 14–0. **Drive: 8 plays, 74 yards, 3:00.**
- DAL – DeMarcus Lawrence 40-yard interception return (Greg Zuerlein kick), 2:17. Cowboys 21–0.

**Second quarter**

- WAS – Antonio Gibson 8-yard pass from Taylor Heinicke (Joey Slye kick), 14:45. Cowboys 21–7. **Drive: 5 plays, 75 yards, 2:32.**
- DAL – Ezekiel Elliott 11-yard run (Greg Zuerlein kick), 10:34. Cowboys 28–7. **Drive: 8 plays, 75 yards, 4:11.**
- DAL – Terence Steele 1-yard pass from Dak Prescott (Greg Zuerlein kick), 2:31. Cowboys 35–7. **Drive: 9 plays, 80 yards, 3:58.**
- DAL – Amari Cooper 13-yard pass from Dak Prescott (Greg Zuerlein kick), 0:05. Cowboys 42–7. **Drive: 12 plays, 89 yards, 1:37.**

**Third quarter**

- DAL – Chauncey Golston blocked punt recovery in end zone (Greg Zuerlein kick), 6:06. Cowboys 49–7.

**Fourth quarter**

- DAL – Malik Turner 9-yard pass from Cooper Rush (Greg Zuerlein kick), 14:16. Cowboys 56–7. **Drive: 5 plays, 79 yards, 2:59.**
- WAS – John Bates 13-yard pass from Kyle Allen (Joey Slye kick), 2:46. Cowboys 56–14. **Drive: 12 plays, 61 yards, 7:02.**

**Top passers**

- WAS – Taylor Heinicke – 7/22, 121 yards, TD, 2 INT
- DAL – Dak Prescott – 28/39, 330 yards, 4 TD

**Top rushers**

- WAS – Jaret Patterson – 9 rushes, 33 yards
- DAL – Ezekiel Elliott – 9 rushes, 37 yards, TD

**Top receivers**

- WAS – Dyami Brown – 2 receptions, 53 yards
- DAL – Amari Cooper – 7 receptions, 85 yards, TD

Washington allowed their most points to the Cowboys in franchise history in giving up 56. The loss dropped Washington to 6–9.

==== Week 17: vs. Philadelphia Eagles ====
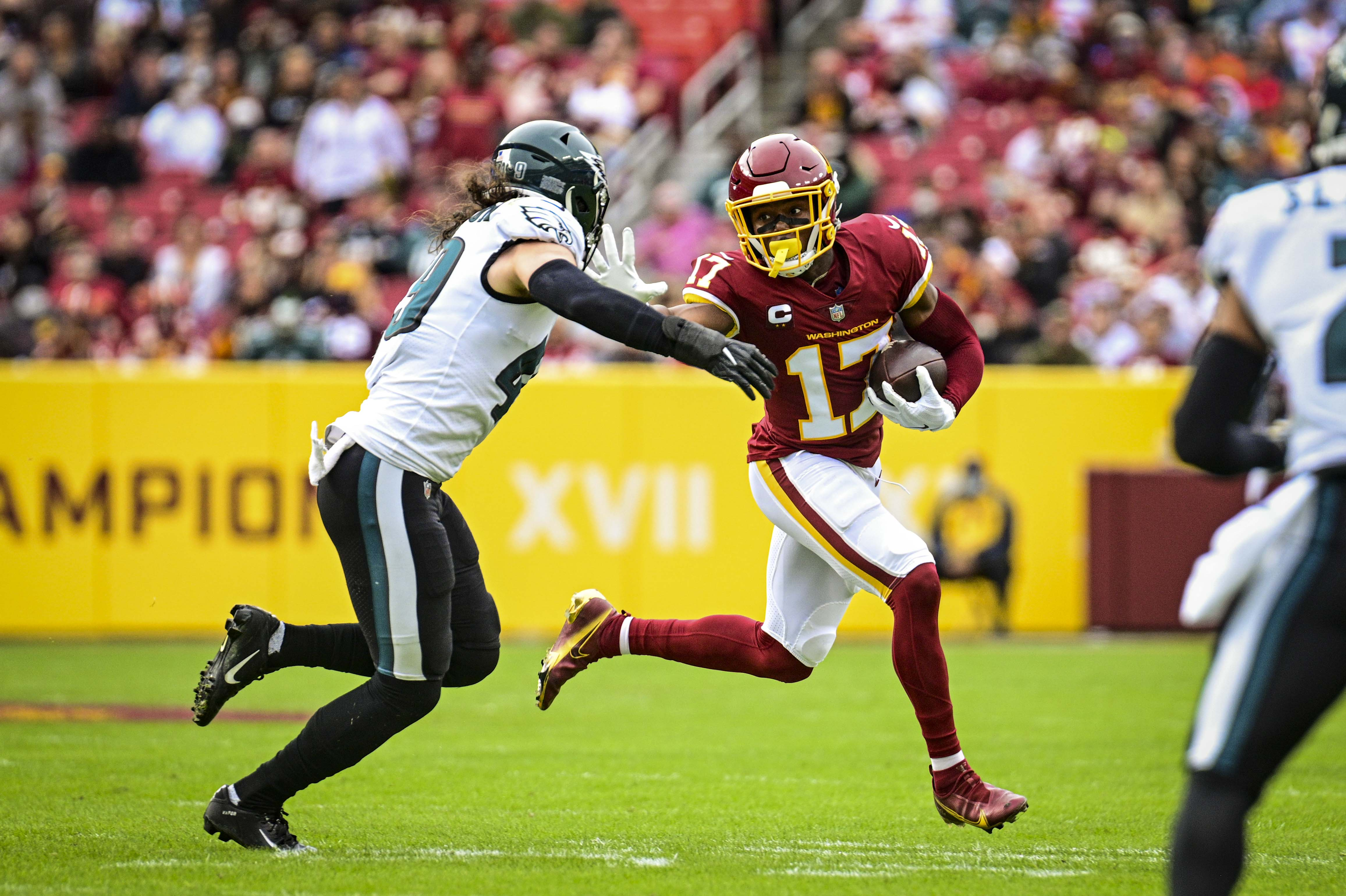
Washington vs. the Philadelphia Eagles

Week 17: Philadelphia Eagles at Washington Football Team – Game summary

Quarter	1	2	3	4	Total
**Eagles**	0	7	7	6	**20**
Football Team	10	6	0	0	**16**

at FedExField, Landover, Maryland

- Date: January 2
- Game time: 1:00 p.m. EST
- Game weather: Cloudy, 60 °F (16 °C)
- Game attendance: 51,563
- Referee: Clete Blakeman
- TV announcers (Fox): Aaron Goldsmith, Mark Schlereth and Shannon Spake
- Recap, Game Book

Game information

**First quarter**

- WAS – Jaret Patterson 11-yard run (Joey Slye kick), 11:54. Football Team 7–0. **Drive: 6 plays, 67 yards, 3:06.**
- WAS – Joey Slye 31-yard field goal, 2:00. Football Team 10–0. **Drive: 9 plays, 63 yards, 4:58.**

**Second quarter**

- PHI – Boston Scott 2-yard run (Jake Elliott kick), 11:49. Football Team 10–7. **Drive: 11 plays, 80 yards, 5:11.**
- WAS – Joey Slye 39-yard field goal, 5:36. Football Team 13–7. **Drive: 11 plays, 54 yards, 6:13.**
- WAS – Joey Slye 55-yard field goal, 0:01. Football Team 16–7. **Drive: 11 plays, 57 yards, 2:05.**

**Third quarter**

- PHI – Boston Scott 1-yard run (Jake Elliott kick), 7:21. Football Team 16–14. **Drive: 14 plays, 75 yards, 7:39.**

**Fourth quarter**

- PHI – Jake Elliott 42-yard field goal, 11:41. Eagles 17–16. **Drive: 9 plays, 33 yards, 4:08.**
- PHI – Jake Elliott 41-yard field goal, 2:21. Eagles 20–16. **Drive: 10 plays, 28 yards, 5:10.**

**Top passers**

- PHI – Jalen Hurts – 17/26, 214 yards
- WAS – Taylor Heinicke – 27/36, 247 yards, INT

**Top rushers**

- PHI – Boston Scott – 14 rushes, 47 yards,2 TD
- WAS – Jaret Patterson – 12 rushes, 57 yards, TD

**Top receivers**

- PHI – Dallas Goedert – 6 receptions, 71 yards
- WAS – Terry McLaurin – 7 receptions, 61 yards

For the first time since 2019 and fourth time in five seasons, the Football Team was swept by the Eagles. Despite leading through three quarters, the Football Team could not withstand a second-half rally by Philadelphia, and a late rally of their own was snuffed out by a game ending interception. Football Team was eliminated from playoff contention with the 20–16 loss.

==== Week 18: at New York Giants ====
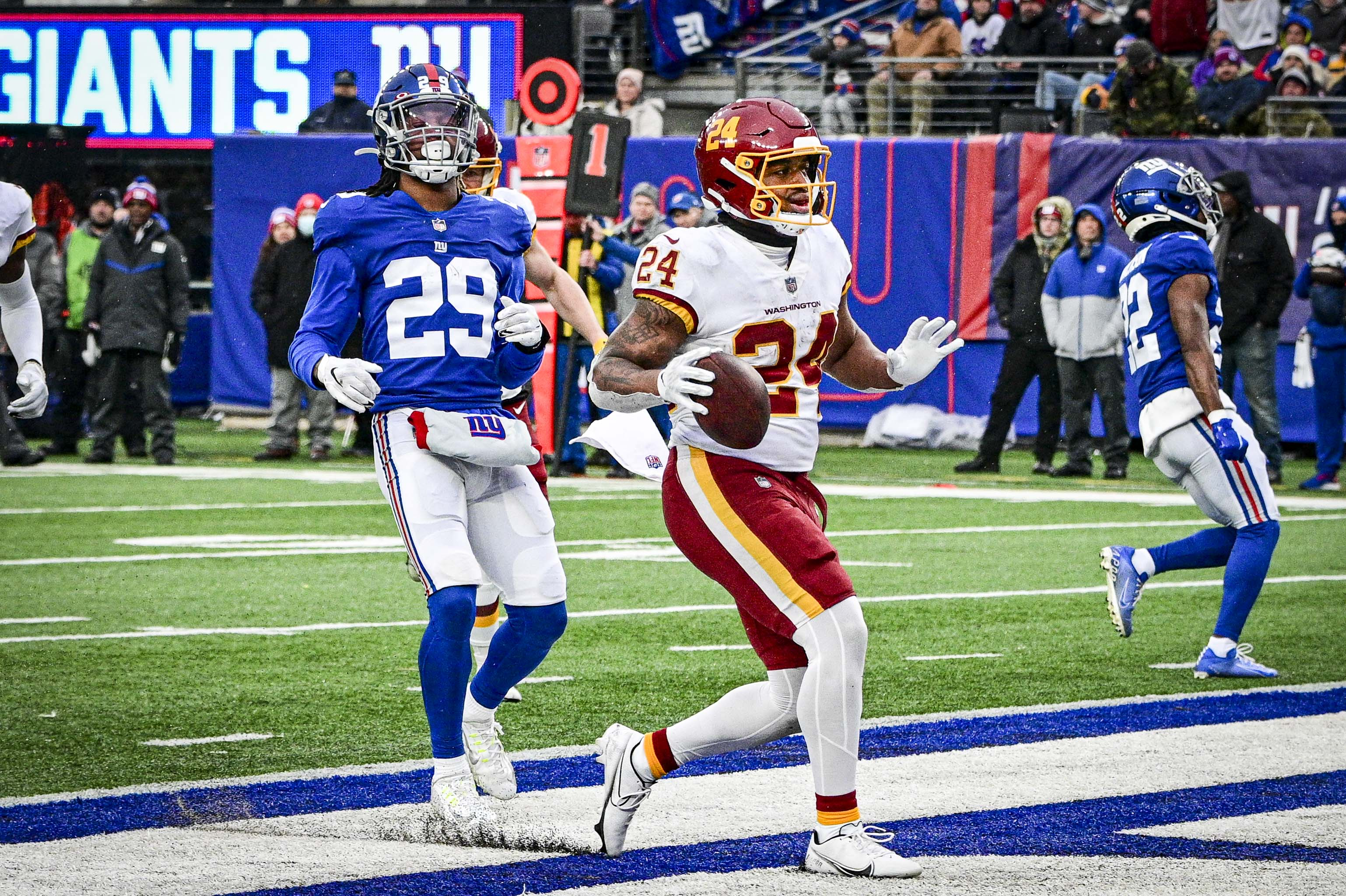
Washington vs. the New York Giants

Week 18: Washington Football Team at New York Giants – Game summary

Quarter	1	2	3	4	Total
**Football Team**	3	3	6	10	**22**
Giants	0	0	0	7	**7**

at MetLife Stadium, East Rutherford, New Jersey

- Date: January 9
- Game time: 1:00 p.m. EST
- Game weather: Rain, 36 °F (2 °C)
- Game attendance: 69,923
- Referee: Adrian Hill
- TV announcers (Fox): Chris Myers, Daryl Johnston and Jen Hale
- Recap

Game information

**First quarter**

- WAS – Joey Slye 23-yard field goal, 9:03. Football Team 3–0. **Drive: 11 plays, 76 yards, 5:57.**

**Second quarter**

- WAS – Joey Slye 43-yard field goal, 0:00. Football Team 6–0. **Drive: 5 plays, 44 yards, 1:34.**

**Third quarter**

- WAS – Bobby McCain 30-yard interception return (pass failed), 3:41. Football Team 12–0.

**Fourth quarter**

- NYG – Darius Slayton 22-yard pass from Jake Fromm (Graham Gano kick), 11:24. Football Team 12–7. **Drive: 14 plays, 69 yards, 7:17.**
- WAS – Antonio Gibson 18-yard run (Joey Slye kick), 6:28. Football Team 19–7. **Drive: 8 plays, 72 yards, 4:56.**
- WAS – Joey Slye 23-yard field goal, 4:40. Football Team 22–7. **Drive: 4 plays, 7 yards, 1:40.**

**Top passers**

- WAS – Taylor Heinicke – 9/18, 120 yards
- NYG – Jake Fromm – 15/31, 103 yards, TD, 2 INT

**Top rushers**

- WAS – Antonio Gibson – 21 rushes, 146 yards, TD
- NYG – Jake Fromm – 5 rushes, 53 yards

**Top receivers**

- WAS – Terry McLaurin – 4 receptions, 93 yards
- NYG – Darius Slayton – 2 receptions, 29 yards, TD

The game was the final for the team to be played as the Washington Football Team, as they rebranded as the Commanders in 2022. With the win, the Football Team swept the Giants for the first time since 2011 as the Redskins. Their defense allowed 167 total yards in the win.

== Standings ==
=== Division ===
NFC East
	W	L	T	PCT	DIV	CONF	PF	PA	STK
^{(3)} Dallas Cowboys	12	5	0	.706	6–0	10–2	530	358	W1
^{(7)} Philadelphia Eagles	9	8	0	.529	3–3	7–5	444	385	L1
Washington Football Team	7	10	0	.412	2–4	6–6	335	434	W1
New York Giants	4	13	0	.235	1–5	3–9	258	416	L6

=== Conference ===
NFC
#	Team	Division	W	L	T	PCT	DIV	CONF	SOS	SOV	STK
Division winners
1 (Note: Green Bay finished ahead of Tampa Bay based on conference record (9–3 vs. 8–4), claiming the No. 1 seed.)	Green Bay Packers	North	13	4	0	.765	4–2	9–3	.479	.480	L1
2	Tampa Bay Buccaneers	South	13	4	0	.765	4–2	8–4	.467	.443	W3
3 (Note: Dallas claimed the No. 3 seed over LA Rams based on conference record (10–2 vs. 8–4).)	Dallas Cowboys	East	12	5	0	.706	6–0	10–2	.488	.431	W1
4	Los Angeles Rams	West	12	5	0	.706	3–3	8–4	.483	.409	L1
Wild cards
5	Arizona Cardinals	West	11	6	0	.647	4–2	7–5	.490	.492	L1
6	San Francisco 49ers	West	10	7	0	.588	2–4	7–5	.500	.438	W2
7 (Note: Philadelphia finished ahead of New Orleans based on head-to-head victory, claiming the 7th and final playoff spot.)	Philadelphia Eagles	East	9	8	0	.529	3–3	7–5	.469	.350	L1
Did not qualify for the postseason
8	New Orleans Saints	South	9	8	0	.529	4–2	7–5	.512	.516	W2
9	Minnesota Vikings	North	8	9	0	.471	4–2	6–6	.507	.434	W1
10 (Note: Washington finished ahead of Atlanta and Seattle based on head-to-head victories.)	Washington Football Team	East	7	10	0	.412	2–4	6–6	.529	.420	W1
11 (Note: Seattle finished ahead of Atlanta based on win percentage in common games (4–2 vs. 3–3 against: San Francisco, New Orleans, Jacksonville, Washington, and Detroit).)	Seattle Seahawks	West	7	10	0	.412	3–3	4–8	.519	.424	W2
12	Atlanta Falcons	South	7	10	0	.412	2–4	4–8	.472	.315	L2
13	Chicago Bears	North	6	11	0	.353	2–4	4–8	.524	.373	L1
14	Carolina Panthers	South	5	12	0	.294	2–4	3–9	.509	.412	L7
15	New York Giants	East	4	13	0	.235	1–5	3–9	.536	.485	L6
16	Detroit Lions	North	3	13	1	.206	2–4	3–9	.528	.627	W1
Tiebreakers (Note: When breaking ties for three or more teams under the NFL's rules, they are first broken within divisions, then comparing only the highest-ranked remaining team from each division.)
