= McTyer =

McTyer is a surname. Notable people with the surname include:

- Tim McTyer (born 1975), American football player and coach
- Torry McTyer (born 1995), American football player

== See also ==
- McTyeire (disambiguation)
