= Brent Vieselmeyer =

American football player and coach (born 1975)

Current position
- Title: Secondary coach/pass game coordinator
- Team: UAB

Biographical details
- Born: September 29, 1975 (age 50); Wauwatosa, Wisconsin, U.S.

Playing career
- Position: Linebacker

Coaching career (HC unless noted)
- 1999–2006: Orange Lutheran HS (Defensive coordinator)
- 2007–2012: Valor Christian HS
- 2013–2014: Houston Baptist (Co-defensive coordinator & linebackers coach)
- 2015–2016: Oakland Raiders (Assistant linebackers)
- 2017: Oakland Raiders (Safeties)
- 2018: Kansas (Offensive analyst)
- 2019: Santa Margarita Catholic HS
- 2020–2022: Washington Football Team / Washington Commanders (Assistant defensive backs)
- 2023: Washington Commanders (Defensive backs)
- 2025–present: UAB (Secondary/pass game coordinator)

Brent Vieselmeyer (born September 29, 1975) is an American football coach. He played college football as a linebacker for the University of Redlands and Concordia University Wisconsin, and has served as an assistant coach in the National Football League (NFL), along with various coaching roles in high school and college football.

== Coaching career ==
=== Early career ===
Vieselmeyer began his career as a high school coach. From 1999 through 2006, he was the defensive coordinator for Orange Lutheran High School. He left after the 2006 season to start the football program for Valor Christian High School, where he first met Jack Del Rio, then-defensive coordinator for the Denver Broncos. Vieselmeyer's program at Valor Christian accumulated a 55–12 win-loss record during his 6 seasons as their head coach.

=== Houston Baptist University ===
Vieselmeyer was hired as co-defensive coordinator and linebackers coach in 2013 by Houston Baptist University for their program's inaugural season. After a developmental 2013 season of exhibition-only play, Houston Baptist went 2–9 in the 2014 season with Vieselmeyer as co-DC.

=== Oakland Raiders ===
In 2015, Vieselmeyer was hired as the assistant linebackers coach of the Oakland Raiders, part of new head coach Jack Del Rio's staff. He was promoted to safeties coach for the 2017 season. Following Del Rio being fired at the end of the 2017 season, he was not retained by new head coach Jon Gruden.

=== Return to college and high school coaching ===
After leaving the Raiders, Vieselmeyer spent the 2018 season as an offensive analyst for Kansas. He then returned to his previous career as a high school football coach, spending the 2019 season as the head coach for Santa Margarita Catholic High School.

=== Washington Football Team / Commanders ===
In January 2020, Vieselmeyer was hired as the new assistant defensive backs and nickel coach for the Washington Football Team, then known as the Redskins. This reunited him with Jack Del Rio, who was hired as the defensive coordinator under new head coach Ron Rivera.

In February 2023, Vieselmeyer was promoted to defensive backs coach, replacing Chris Harris, who left for a position with the Tennessee Titans.

Along with Del Rio, Vieselmeyer was fired following a 45–10 loss to the Dallas Cowboys on Thanksgiving, in which the team had allowed the most points in the NFL by that point in the season.

=== UAB ===
On January 2, 2025, Vieselmeyer was officially hired as the linebackers coach for UAB. The move reunited him with UAB defensive coordinator Steve Russ and defensive line coach Sam Mills III, both of whom Vieselmeyer served with on the Commanders coaching staff from 2020 to 2022.

== Personal life ==
Vieselmeyer grew up in Tustin, California, and graduated from Orange Lutheran High School in 1994. His father was his defensive coordinator; he later handed these duties to Brent after he graduated from college.

Vieselmeyer played college football as a linebacker for University of Redlands and Concordia University Wisconsin, graduating from Concordia in 1999 with a bachelor's degree in education, and later receiving a master's degree in educational administration from University of Phoenix in 2005. His father, Dean Vieselmeyer, was a reverend, theology professor, and longtime administrator for Concordia University Irvine. He also co-founded the football program at Orange Lutheran High School, coaching alongside Brent for several years. His mother, Dian, also spent over 30 years as an academic advisor, administrator, and professor for Concordia University Irvine.

Vieselmeyer coached former college quarterback and NFL assistant coach Luke Del Rio in high school at Valor Christian. Vieselmeyer is married with two daughters.
