= McTyeire =

McTyeire may refer to:

== People ==
- Holland Nimmons McTyeire (1824–1889), American Methodist bishop, Vanderbilt University co-founder, and slavery advocate
- Rex H. McTyeire, co-founder of the far-right militia Oath Keepers in the U.S.
- Holland McTyeire Smith (1882–1967), American marine general
- Holland Thompson (historian) (Holland McTyeire Thompson; 1873–1940), American historian

== Places ==
- McTyeire, Georgia, a town now known as Young Harris, Georgia, U.S.

== Schools ==
- McTyeire College, a defunct Methodist college in McKenzie, Tennessee, U.S.
- McTyeire Hall, a residential building at Vanderbilt University in Nashville, Tennessee, U.S.
- McTyeire Institute, now known as Young Harris College, in Georgia, U.S.
- McTyeire School, in Shanghai, China

== See also ==
- McTyer (disambiguation)
