= Sam Mills III =

American football player and coach (born 1978)

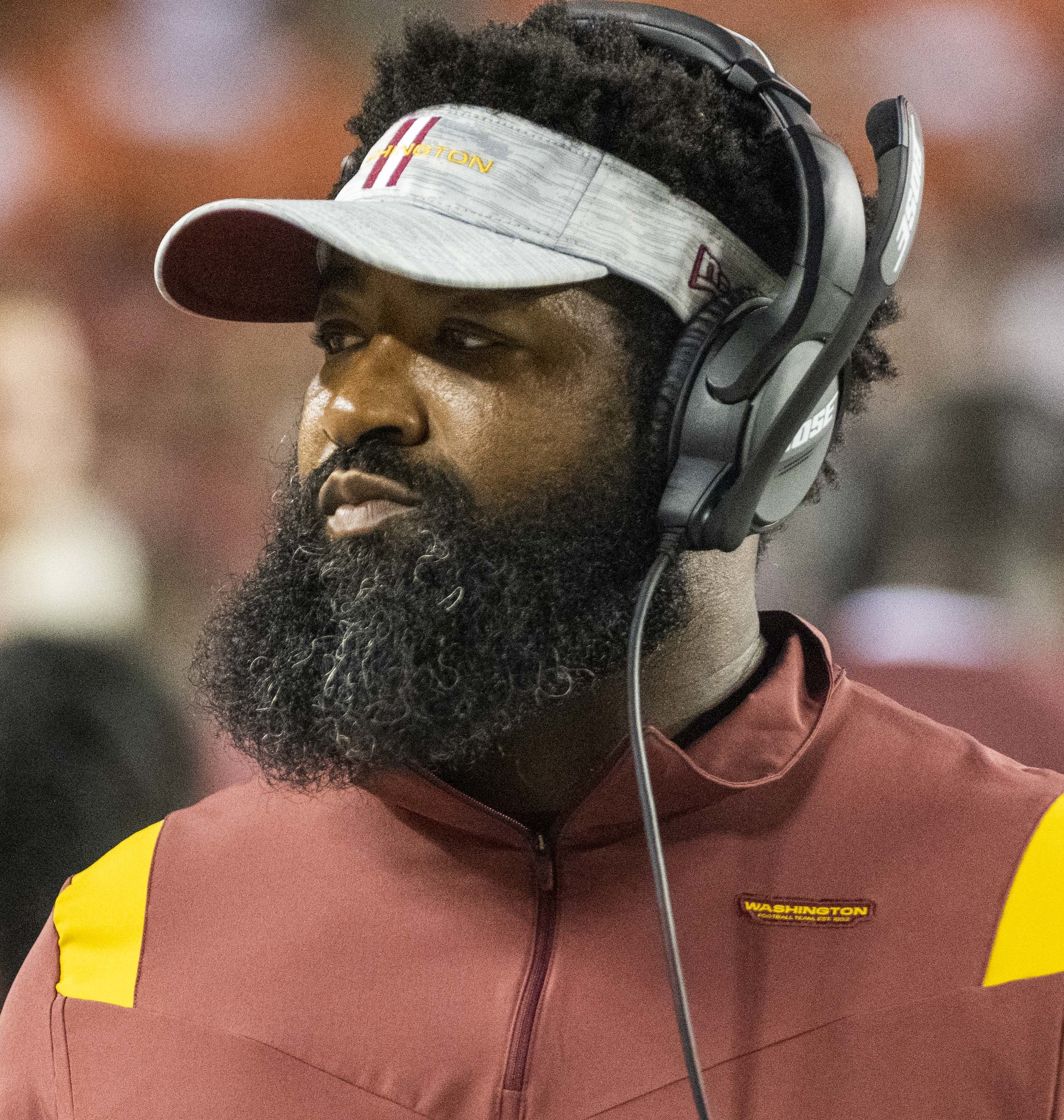
- Mills III with the Washington Football Team in 2021

Current position
- Title: Defensive line coach
- Team: UAB

Biographical details
- Born: May 20, 1978 (age 48); Long Branch, New Jersey, U.S.

Playing career
- 1997–1999: Montclair State
- Position: Defensive back

Coaching career (HC unless noted)
- 2005: Carolina Panthers (Strength & conditioning/Defensive assistant)
- 2006–2010: Carolina Panthers (Defensive quality control)
- 2011–2017: Carolina Panthers (Assistant defensive line)
- 2018: Carolina Panthers (Defensive line)
- 2019: Carolina Panthers (Defensive line & game management)
- 2020–2022: Washington Football Team / Washington Commanders (Defensive line)
- 2023: Montclair High School (Volunteer assistant)
- 2025–present: UAB (Defensive line)

Samuel Davis Mills III (born May 20, 1978) is an American football coach who is currently the defensive line coach for UAB. He has also served as a defensive line coach for the Carolina Panthers and Washington Commanders of the National Football League (NFL). He is the son of Pro Football Hall of Famer Sam Mills.

== Coaching career ==
=== Carolina Panthers ===
In 2005, Mills was hired by the Carolina Panthers as a strength and conditioning coach and defensive assistant. In 2006, Mills was promoted to defensive quality control coach. In 2011, Mills was retained by new head coach Ron Rivera and was promoted to assistant defensive line coach. In December 2018, Mills was promoted to defensive line coach after Brady Hoke was fired.

Mills served as an assistant coach for the East-West Shrine Bowl in 2018, and a year later, he was named the head coach of the East squad for the 2019 Shrine Bowl.

On February 13, 2019, the Panthers announced that Mills was being promoted to defensive line & game management coach. In addition to his duties as the defensive line coach, Mills would be assisting head coach Ron Rivera with clock management, replay challenges, and other situational football analysis. Mills was not retained by new Panthers head coach Matt Rhule in 2020.

=== Washington Commanders ===
In January 2020, Mills was hired by the Washington Commanders as their defensive line coach, following his longtime Panthers head coach and mentor Ron Rivera. He was fired by the team in August 2022, with Rivera citing "philosophical differences" as the reason.

=== UAB ===
Mills spent the 2023 season as a volunteer assistant coach for Montclair High School in his native New Jersey, and spent 2024 working for football analytics firm CAI. On February 26, 2025, he was named defensive line coach for UAB. The move reunited him with UAB defensive coordinator Steve Russ and linebackers coach Brent Vieselmeyer, both of whom Mills had worked with as position coaches for the Commanders.

== Personal life ==
He is the son of Sam Mills, a Pro Football Hall of Fame linebacker who played for the New Orleans Saints and Carolina Panthers in the 1980s and 1990s. While Mills III was initially recruited by larger schools such as Nebraska, Penn State, and Tennessee, he missed his senior season of high school football due to a torn Achilles tendon he suffered while playing pickup basketball. He ultimately committed to play defensive back for his father’s alma mater, Division III Montclair State University. As a teenager, Mills III worked on the equipment staff for the Panthers.
