= Tim McTyer =

American football player and coach (born 1975)

No. 24, 22
- Position: Cornerback

Personal information
- Born: December 14, 1975 (age 50); Los Angeles, California, U.S.
- Listed height: 5 ft 11 in (1.80 m)
- Listed weight: 191 lb (87 kg)

Career information
- High school: Los Angeles (CA) Washington Prep
- College: BYU
- NFL draft: 1997: undrafted
- Expansion draft: 1999: 1st round, 11th overall pick

Career history
- Indianapolis Colts (1997)*; Philadelphia Eagles (1997–1998); Cleveland Browns (1999–2000)
- * Offseason or practice squad member only
- Stats at Pro Football Reference

Timothy Thomas McTyer (born December 14, 1975) is the head American football coach at Adelanto High School in California and a former cornerback in the National Football League (NFL). He played two seasons for the Philadelphia Eagles and one for the Cleveland Browns. He played college football at Brigham Young University. He was hired as head football coach of Banning High School in February 2010 after coaching at local high schools and Los Angeles Southwest College. McTyer is the father of NFL cornerback Torry McTyer.

Pre-draft measurables
Height	Weight	Arm length	Hand span	40-yard dash	10-yard split	20-yard split	20-yard shuttle	Three-cone drill	Vertical jump	Broad jump	Bench press
5 ft 11 in (1.80 m)	181 lb (82 kg)	31 in (0.79 m)	9 in (0.23 m)	4.58 s	1.63 s	2.74 s	4.35 s	7.49 s	31.0 in (0.79 m)	9 ft 0 in (2.74 m)	7 reps
