= Torry McTyer =

American football player (born 1995)

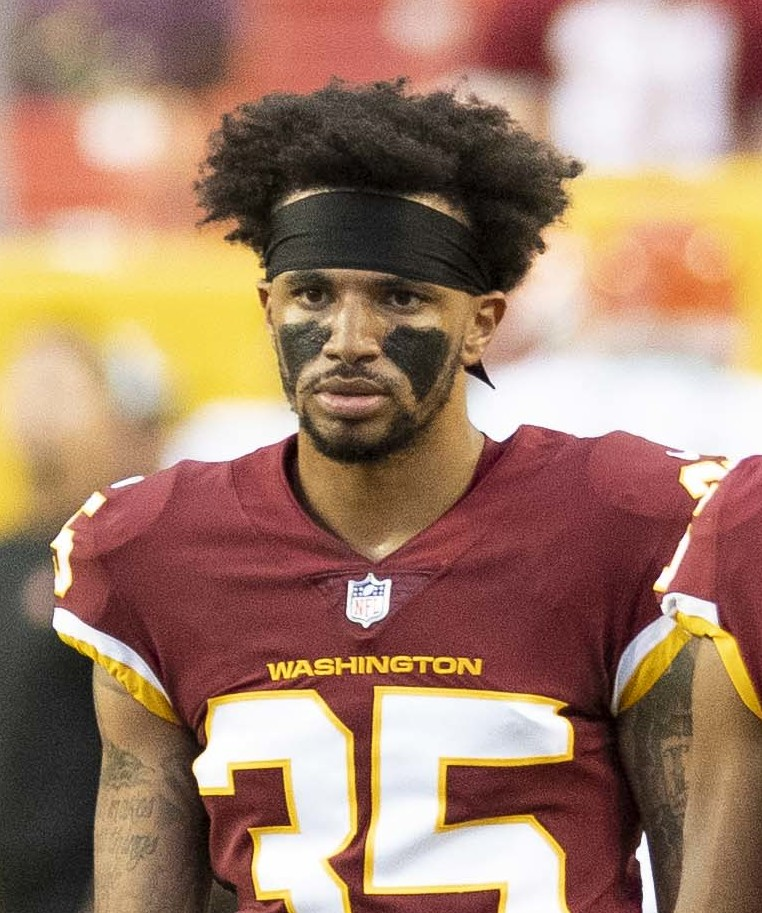
- McTyer with the Washington Football Team in 2021

No. 33, 24, 20, 35
- Position: Cornerback

Personal information
- Born: April 10, 1995 (age 31); Los Angeles, California, U.S.
- Listed height: 5 ft 11 in (1.80 m)
- Listed weight: 188 lb (85 kg)

Career information
- High school: Cathedral (Los Angeles)
- College: UNLV
- NFL draft: 2017: undrafted

Career history
- Miami Dolphins (2017–2018); Kansas City Chiefs (2019)*; Cincinnati Bengals (2019–2020); Washington Football Team (2021)
- * Offseason or practice squad member only

Career NFL statistics
- Total tackles: 35
- Pass deflections: 5
- Stats at Pro Football Reference

Torry McTyer (born April 10, 1995) is an American former professional football player who was a cornerback in the National Football League (NFL). He played college football for the UNLV Rebels before signing with the Miami Dolphins as an undrafted free agent in 2017. McTyer was also a member of the Kansas City Chiefs, Cincinnati Bengals, and Washington Football Team.

== Early life and college ==
A three-star recruit, McTyer committed to UNLV to play college football over an offer from California. In 2016, he started 11 games at cornerback for UNLV and finished the season with 49 tackles, 15 passes defensed with 3 interceptions.

== Professional career ==
Pre-draft measurables
Height	Weight	Arm length	Hand span	40-yard dash	10-yard split	20-yard split	20-yard shuttle	Three-cone drill	Vertical jump	Broad jump	Bench press
5 ft 11 3/8 in (1.81 m)	178 lb (81 kg)	30 1/4 in (0.77 m)	8 5/8 in (0.22 m)	4.41 s	1.57 s	2.56 s	4.42 s	6.91 s	33.5 in (0.85 m)	10 ft 6 in (3.20 m)	10 reps
All values from Pro Day

=== Miami Dolphins ===
McTyer signed with the Miami Dolphins as an undrafted free agent on May 5, 2017. He was waived on August 31, 2019, .

=== Kansas City Chiefs ===
On September 3, 2019, McTyer signed with the Kansas City Chiefs' practice squad.

=== Cincinnati Bengals ===
On September 26, 2019, McTyer was signed by the Cincinnati Bengals off the Chiefs practice squad. He re-signed with the Bengals on March 23, 2020. He was waived on September 5, 2020, but re-signed with the team two days later. He was waived again on September 15 and re-signed to the practice squad the following day. McTyer was elevated to the active roster on October 3 and 10 for the team's weeks 4 and 5 games against the Jacksonville Jaguars and Baltimore Ravens, and reverted to the practice squad after each game. He was placed on the practice squad/injured list on October 24. His practice squad contract expired after the season on January 11, 2021.

=== Washington Football Team ===
McTyer signed with the Washington Football Team on January 12, 2021. He got significant playing time in the Week 4 win against the Atlanta Falcons due to an injury to cornerback Benjamin St-Juste, but was injured on the last play of the game. McTyer was placed on injured reserve on October 5, 2021.

== Personal life ==
McTyer is the son of former NFL cornerback Tim McTyer.
