= Steve Russ =

American football player and coach (born 1972)

Air Force Falcons
- Title: Defensive coordinator

Personal information
- Born: September 16, 1972 (age 54); Stetsonville, Wisconsin, U.S.
- Listed height: 6 ft 4 in (1.93 m)
- Listed weight: 245 lb (111 kg)

Career information
- Position: Linebacker (No. 58)
- High school: Medford (WI)
- College: Air Force
- NFL draft: 1995: 7th round, 218th overall pick

Career history

Playing
- Denver Broncos (1995–2000); Los Angeles Xtreme (2001)

Coaching
- Ohio (2001) Outside linebackers coach; Ohio (2002–2003) Inside linebackers coach; Ohio (2004) Special teams/inside linebackers coach; Syracuse (2005–2006) Linebackers coach; Syracuse (2007) Defensive coordinator/linebackers coach; Wake Forest (2008–2009) Tight ends coach; Wake Forest (2010) Linebackers coach; Wake Forest (2011) Defensive backs coach; Air Force (2012) Assistant head coach/co-defensive coordinator/defensive back coach; Air Force (2013) Assistant head coach/co-defensive coordinator/inside linebackers coach; Air Force (2014–2017) Assistant head coach/defensive coordinator/defensive backs coach; Carolina Panthers (2018–2019) Linebackers coach; Washington Football Team / Commanders (2020–2023) Linebackers coach; Air Force (2024) Special assistant to the head coach; UAB (2025) Defensive coordinator; Air Force (2026–present) Defensive coordinator

Awards and highlights
- 2× Super Bowl champion (XXXII, XXXIII); XFL champion (2001)

Career NFL statistics
- Tackles: 6
- Stats at Pro Football Reference

Steve Russ (born September 16, 1972) is an American football coach and former professional linebacker who is the defensive coordinator for the Air Force Falcons football team. He played college football as a linebacker for Air Force before being drafted by the Denver Broncos in the seventh round of the 1995 NFL draft. He also played for the Los Angeles Xtreme in the original XFL and has been a coach since 2001.

== Coaching career ==
=== Carolina Panthers ===
In January 2018, Russ was hired by the Carolina Panthers as their linebackers coach under head coach Ron Rivera. Following the hiring of new head coach Matt Rhule in January 2020, Russ was not retained by the Panthers.

=== Washington Football Team / Commanders ===
In January 2020, Russ was hired again by Rivera to be the linebackers coach for the Washington Football Team, then known as the Washington Redskins. He held the role for four seasons, but was fired upon the hiring of new head coach Dan Quinn.

=== Air Force ===
Russ was hired as a special assistant to the head coach for Air Force for the 2024 season, returning to his alma mater, where he also coached in various defensive roles from 2012 to 2017, including defensive coordinator and assistant head coach.

=== UAB ===
Russ was announced as the new defensive coordinator for UAB on December 20, 2024.
