= Curtis Samuel =

American football player (born 1996)

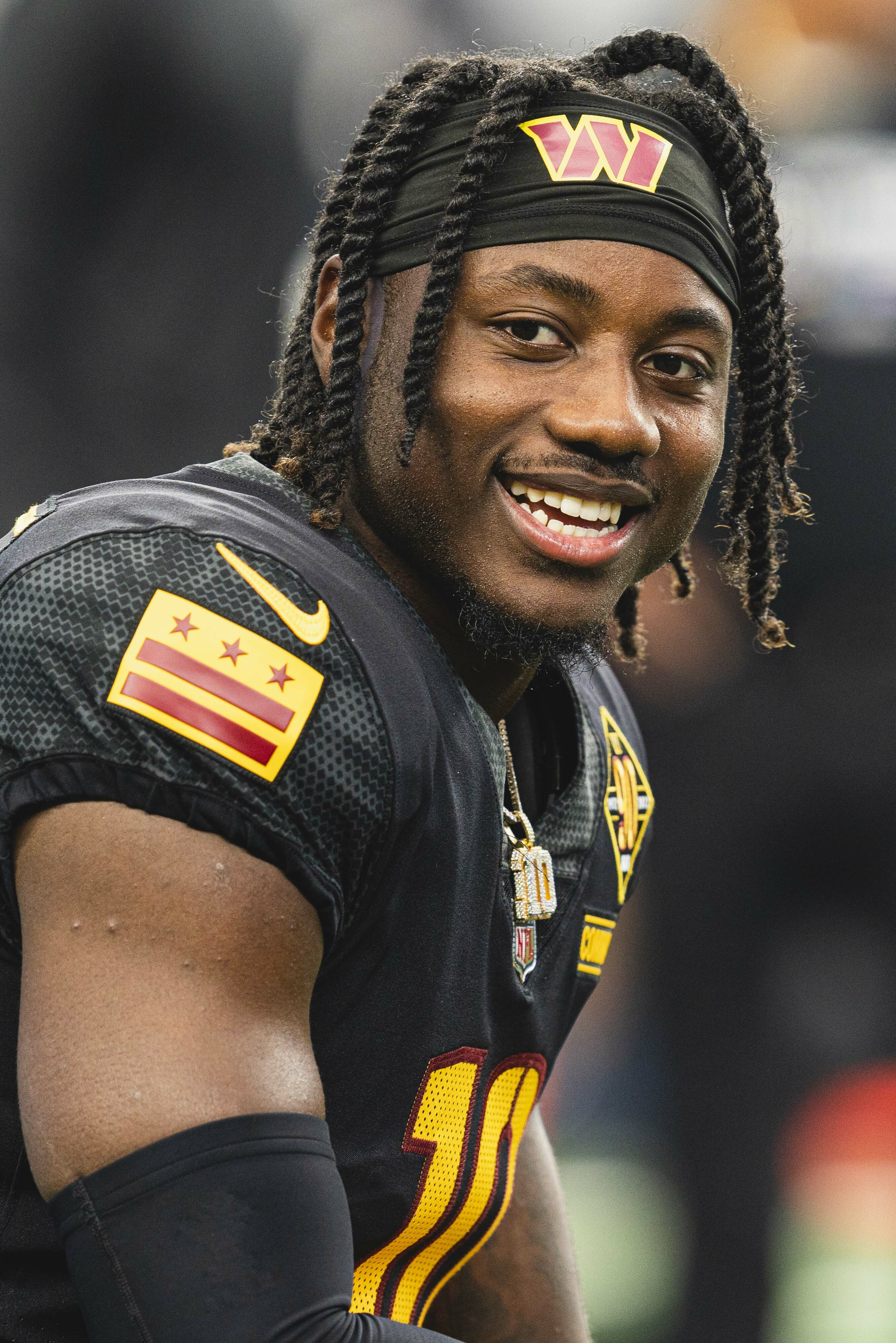
- Samuel with the Washington Commanders in 2022

Profile
- Positions: Wide receiver, kickoff returner

Personal information
- Born: August 11, 1996 (age 30); Brooklyn, New York City, U.S.
- Listed height: 5 ft 11 in (1.80 m)
- Listed weight: 195 lb (88 kg)

Career information
- High school: Erasmus Hall (Brooklyn)
- College: Ohio State (2014–2016)
- NFL draft: 2017: 2nd round, 40th overall pick

Career history
- Carolina Panthers (2017–2020); Washington Football Team / Commanders (2021–2023); Buffalo Bills (2024–2025)

Awards and highlights
- CFP national champion (2015); First-team All-American (2016); First-team All-Big Ten (2016)

Career NFL statistics as of 2025
- Receptions: 355
- Receiving yards: 3,717
- Receiving touchdowns: 24
- Rushing yards: 729
- Rushing average: 5.8
- Rushing touchdowns: 7
- Return yards: 619
- Stats at Pro Football Reference

Curtis Samuel (born August 11, 1996) is an American professional football wide receiver and kickoff returner. He played college football for the Ohio State Buckeyes, winning the 2015 College Football Playoff National Championship and earning All-American honors in 2016. Samuel was selected by the Carolina Panthers in the second round of the 2017 NFL draft and played four seasons with them and three seasons with the Washington Commanders before joining the Buffalo Bills in 2024.

== Early life ==
Samuel attended Erasmus Hall High School in Brooklyn, New York, where he played as a running back for the Dutchmen football team and also ran track. As a junior, Samuel averaged 11.5 yards per carry while rushing for 1,047 yards and 13 touchdowns. He was named New York Daily News City Player of the Year in 2012. In track, he won the 55 meters at the New York State track and field championships with a blistering time of 6.44 seconds. In addition to his success as a running back, he also scored three receiving touchdowns and two punt return touchdowns. In his senior year Samuel averaged 15.8 yards per rush for 1,461 yards and 17 touchdowns. He was named the 2013 New York Gatorade Player of the Year and was invited to All-American Bowl.

== College career ==
A 4-star running-back recruit, Samuel committed to play college football for the Ohio State Buckeyes. He contributed in the 2014–2016 seasons under head coach Urban Meyer. In the 2014 season, he had 58 carries for 383 rushing yards and six rushing touchdowns to go along with 11 receptions for 95 receiving yards.

In the 2015 season, he had 17 carries for 132 rushing yards and one rushing touchdown to go along with 22 receptions for 289 receiving yards and two receiving touchdowns.

In the 2016 season, he had 97 carries for 771 rushing yards and eight rushing touchdowns to go along with 74 receptions for 865 receiving yards and seven receiving touchdowns. He was awarded first-team All-Big Ten and All-American honors. Samuel is the only player in Ohio State history to ever gain over 1,000 career yards in both rushing and receiving.

== Professional career ==
Pre-draft measurables
Height	Weight	Arm length	Hand span	Wingspan	40-yard dash	10-yard split	20-yard split	20-yard shuttle	Three-cone drill	Vertical jump	Broad jump	Bench press	Wonderlic
5 ft 10 5/8 in (1.79 m)	196 lb (89 kg)	31 1/4 in (0.79 m)	9 1/2 in (0.24 m)	6 ft 3 1/4 in (1.91 m)	4.31 s	1.49 s	2.56 s	4.33 s	7.09 s	37 in (0.94 m)	9 ft 11 in (3.02 m)	18 reps	22
All values from NFL Combine

=== Carolina Panthers ===
==== 2017 ====
Prior to the NFL Draft, during the combine, Samuel switched to wide-receiver and thus was selected by the Carolina Panthers in the second round (40th overall) of the 2017 NFL draft. On May 5, 2017, the Panthers signed Samuel to a four-year, $6.45 million contract with $4.05 million guaranteed and a signing bonus of $2.83 million.

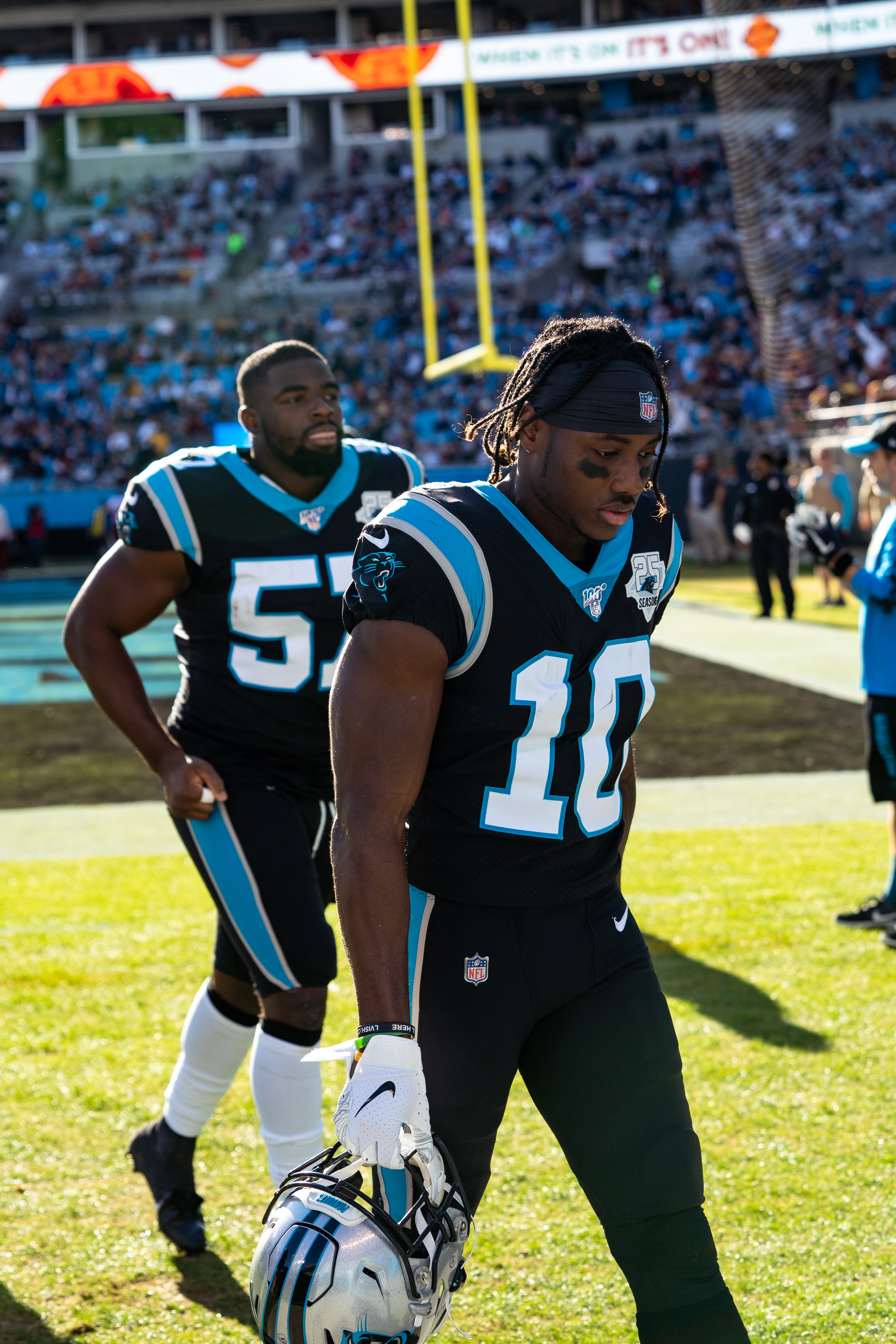
Samuel with the Panthers in 2019

On September 17, 2017, in Week 2, Samuel had his first two career receptions, which went for seven yards, in a 9–3 victory over the Buffalo Bills. In Week 3, against the New Orleans Saints, he recorded a 31-yard rush on an end-around. On November 14, 2017, Samuel's rookie season abruptly ended after he suffered a left ankle injury during Monday Night Football against the Miami Dolphins in Week 10, in which the Panthers announced that his ankle would have surgery. He was placed on injured reserve on November 24, 2017. Overall, in his rookie season, he finished with 15 receptions for 115 receiving yards to go along with four carries for 64 rushing yards in nine games.

==== 2018 ====
In the 2018 season, Samuel scored his first career touchdown on October 7 against the New York Giants. Overall, he finished the 2018 season with 39 receptions for 494 receiving yards and five receiving touchdowns. In addition, he had 84 rushing yards and two rushing touchdowns on eight carries.

==== 2019 ====
In Week 3 of the 2019 season against the Arizona Cardinals, Samuel caught five passes for 53 yards and his first receiving touchdown of the season in the 38–20 win. Overall, in the 2019 season, he had 54 receptions for 627 receiving yards and six receiving touchdowns to go along with 19 carries for 130 rushing yards and one rushing touchdown.

==== 2020 ====
In Week 9, against the Kansas City Chiefs, Samuel had nine receptions for 105 receiving yards and one receiving touchdown in the 33–31 loss. In Week 11 against the Detroit Lions, Samuel recorded 8 catches for 70 yards, including the first touchdown pass thrown by quarterback P. J. Walker during the 20–0 win. He was placed on the reserve/COVID-19 list by the Panthers on December 7, 2020, and activated on December 11. In Week 17 against the New Orleans Saints, Samuel recorded seven catches for a season high 118 yards during the 33–7 loss. He finished the 2020 season with 77 receptions for 851 receiving yards and three receiving touchdowns to go along with 41 carries for 200 rushing yards and two rushing touchdowns.

=== Washington Football Team / Commanders ===
==== 2021 ====
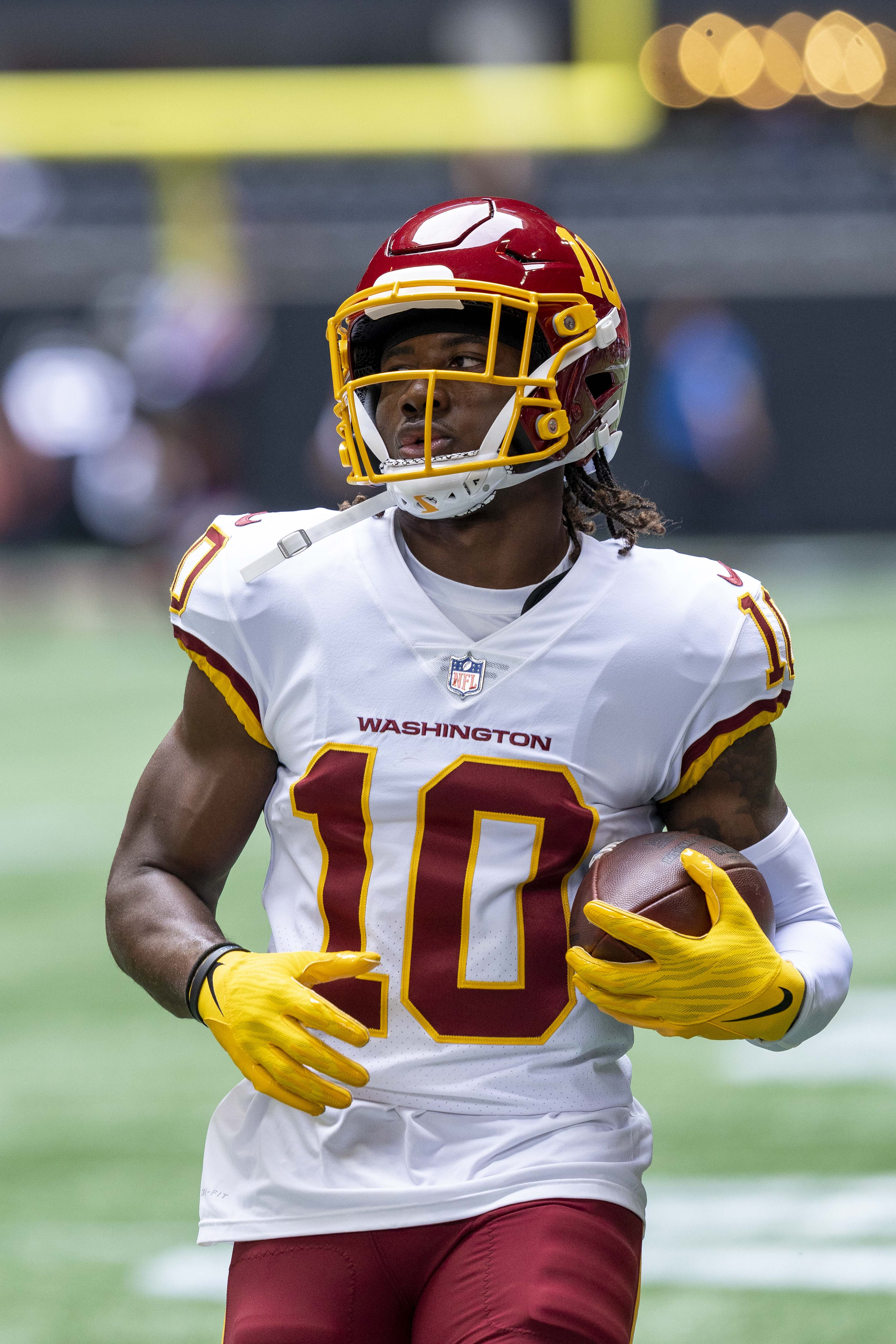
Samuel in 2021

Samuel signed a three-year, $34.5 million contract with the Washington Football Team on March 18, 2021. By signing with the Commanders, he was reunited with his college roommate, Terry McLaurin. He was placed on the active/physically unable to perform (PUP) list at the start of training camp due to a groin injury before he was placed on the COVID-19 reserve list two days in. He returned to the PUP list on August 9 and was placed back to the active roster on August 15. Samuel tweaked his groin in practice just days before the opening game of the season and was placed on injured reserve. Samuel returned to the active roster on October 1, 2021.

==== 2022 ====
In the 2022 season opening win over the Jacksonville Jaguars, Samuel recorded 55 receiving yards off eight receptions, 17 rushing yards, and his first touchdown reception for Washington. The next game, he followed up with seven receptions for 78 yards, 21 rushing yards, and a receiving touchdown against the Lions. Samuel played in the entirety of the 17 game season and was occasionally used as a running back as well as a wide receiver. He finished the year with 64 receptions for 646 yards and four receiving touchdowns as well as 38 rushing attempts for 187 yards and one rushing touchdown.

==== 2023 ====
Samuel changed his uniform number to 4 for the 2023 season. In the 2023 season, he had 62 receptions for 613 yards and four touchdowns. He had one game with 100 receiving yards, which came in Week 12 against the Cowboys.

=== Buffalo Bills ===
On March 14, 2024, Samuel signed a three-year, $24 million deal with the Buffalo Bills. He finished the 2024 season with 31 receptions for 253 yards and one touchdown, which came in Week 11 against the Kansas City Chiefs.

Samuel made his postseason debut in the Wild Card round game against the Denver Broncos. He scored his first career postseason touchdown on a 55-yard reception from Josh Allen in the fourth quarter of a 31–7 victory. He scored a touchdown in the AFC Championship loss to the Chiefs.

Samuel began the 2025 season operating as a backup wide receiver, recording seven receptions for 81 yards and a touchdown across six appearances. He was placed on injured reserve on November 28, 2025, due to an elbow injury. On January 16, 2026, Samuel was activated from injured reserve ahead of Buffalo's divisional round matchup against the Denver Broncos.

On March 6, 2026, Samuel was released by the Bills.

== Career statistics ==
=== NFL ===
==== Regular season ====
Season	Team	Games		Receiving						Rushing					Fumbles	
Season	Team	GP	GS	Tgt	Rec	Yds	Avg	Lng	TD	Att	Yds	Avg	Lng	TD	Fum	Lost
2017	CAR	9	4	26	15	115	7.7	23	0	4	64	16.0	31	0	0	0
2018	CAR	13	8	65	39	494	12.7	53	5	8	84	10.5	33	2	1	1
2019	CAR	16	15	105	54	627	11.6	44	6	19	130	6.8	16	1	0	0
2020	CAR	15	5	97	77	851	11.1	44	3	41	200	4.9	45	2	1	0
2021	WAS	5	1	9	6	27	4.5	10	0	4	11	2.8	8	0	0	0
2022	WAS	17	12	92	64	656	10.3	49	4	38	187	4.9	21	1	1	1
2023	WAS	16	13	91	62	613	9.9	37	4	7	39	5.6	15	1	0	0
2024	BUF	14	2	46	31	253	8.2	38	1	5	14	2.8	7	0	0	0
2025	BUF	2	0	4	3	35	11.7	20	1	0	0	0.0	0	0	0	0
Career		107	60	535	351	3,671	10.5	53	24	127	729	5.8	45	7	3	2

==== Playoffs ====
Season	Team	Games		Receiving						Rushing					Fumbles	
Season	Team	GP	GS	Tgt	Rec	Yds	Avg	Lng	TD	Att	Yds	Avg	Lng	TD	Fum	Lost
2024	BUF	3	0	8	6	81	13.5	55	2	0	0	0	0	0	0	0
2025	BUF	1	1	3	1	2	2.0	2	0	0	0	0	0	0	0	0
Career		4	1	11	7	83	11.9	55	2	0	0	0	0	0	0	0

=== College ===
Year	Team	Games		Rushing				Receiving			
Year	Team	GP	GS	Att	Yards	Avg	TD	Rec	Yards	Avg	TD
2014	Ohio State	14	1	58	383	6.6	6	11	95	8.6	0
2015	Ohio State	13	2	17	132	7.8	1	22	289	13.1	2
2016	Ohio State	13	12	97	771	7.9	8	74	865	11.7	7
Career		40	15	172	1,286	7.5	15	107	1,249	11.7	9
