= 2022 Washington Commanders season =

91st season in franchise history, final one under Daniel Snyder's ownership

- Jersey patch for the franchise's 90th anniversary
- Owner: Daniel Snyder
- General manager: Martin Mayhew
- President: Jason Wright
- Head coach: Ron Rivera
- Offensive coordinator: Scott Turner
- Defensive coordinator: Jack Del Rio
- Home stadium: FedExField

Results
- Record: 8–8–1
- Division place: 4th NFC East
- Playoffs: Did not qualify
- All-Pros: ST Jeremy Reaves (1st team)
- Pro Bowlers: WR Terry McLaurin; DT Jonathan Allen; DT Daron Payne; P Tress Way; ST Jeremy Reaves

Uniform
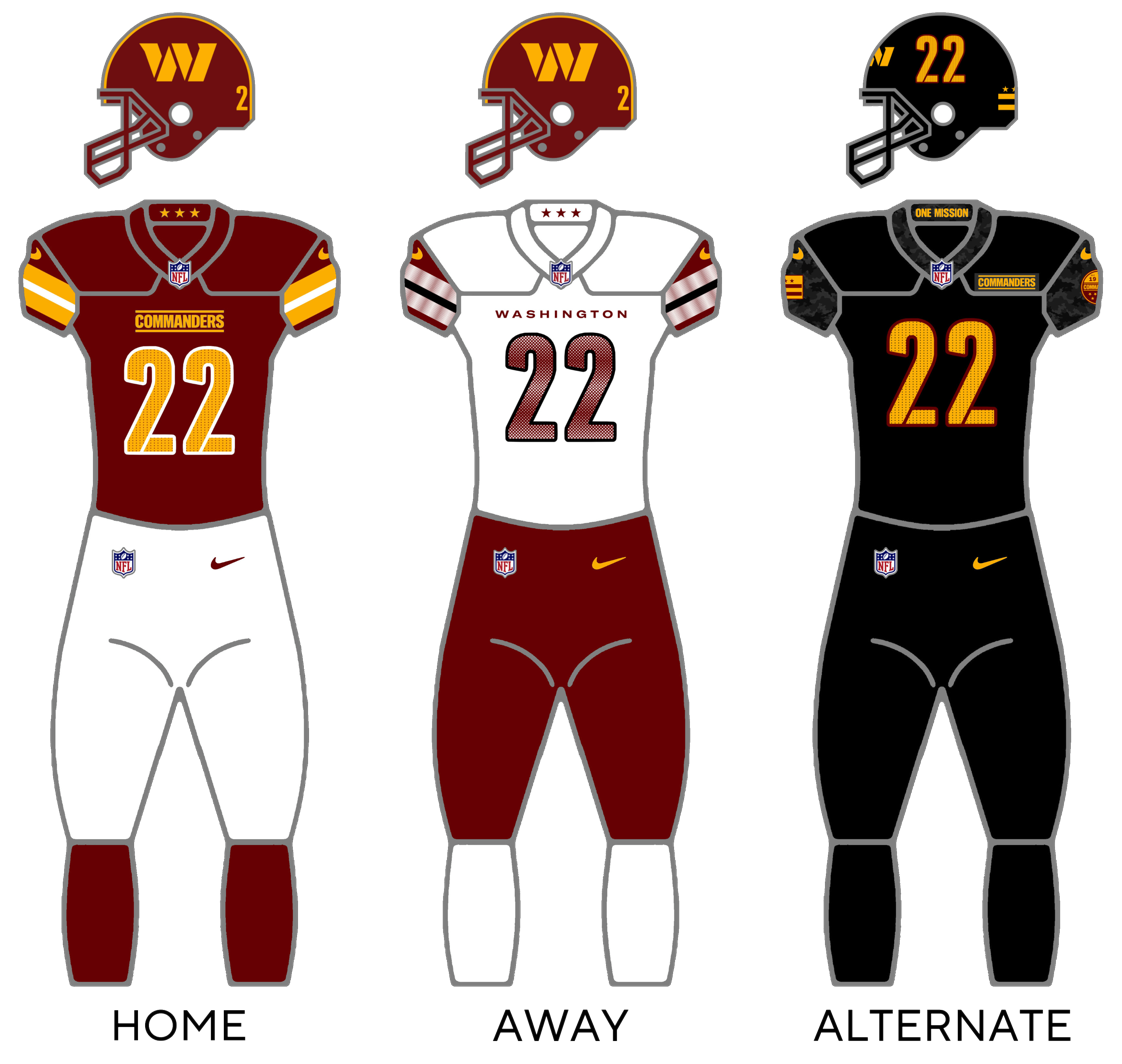

The 2022 season was the Washington Commanders' 91st in the National Football League (NFL) and the first under the Commanders branding, with new logos and uniforms being introduced after temporarily playing as the Washington Football Team for the previous two seasons following the retirement of the Redskins branding in 2020. The team placed fourth in the NFC East and missed the playoffs, but improved on their 7–10 record from 2021 with an 8–8–1 record. Wide receiver Terry McLaurin, defensive tackles Jonathan Allen and Daron Payne, punter Tress Way, and special teamer Jeremy Reaves made the 2023 Pro Bowl, with Reaves also being named first-team All-Pro. This was the Commanders' sixth consecutive season with a new quarterback starting on opening week, as Ryan Fitzpatrick announced his retirement on June 2.

Washington traded for Indianapolis Colts quarterback Carson Wentz in the offseason, who started the season 2–4 before being replaced by Taylor Heinicke after a finger injury. The team then went on a 5–3–1 run under Heinicke, improving upon their record from the previous season with a Week 13 tie against the New York Giants, but missed the playoffs for a second consecutive season after a loss to the Cleveland Browns coupled with wins by the Detroit Lions and Green Bay Packers in Week 17, despite finishing with a non-losing record for the first time since 2016. Wentz started again in Week 17 but was benched for the season finale due to poor performance in favor of rookie Sam Howell.

The Commanders were the first team since their 2008 squad and the 2008 New Orleans Saints to finish last in their division with a non-losing record. They also became the first team to finish at .500 in a 17 game season (a feat that requires at least one tie game). It was also the final season under Daniel Snyder's ownership, as he sold the organization during the 2023 offseason, to an investment group headed by Josh Harris for $6.05 billion.

The Commanders' defense ranked third in total defense (304.6 yards per game), fourth in passing defense (191.3 yards per game), 11th in run defense (113.3 yards per game), eighth in scoring defense (20.2 points per game), and 12th in sacks (43) despite finishing 26th in takeaways (18).

== Draft ==
2022 NFL draft picks
Round	Pick	Player	Position	College
1	16	Jahan Dotson	WR	Penn State
2	47	Phidarian Mathis	DT	Alabama
3	98	Brian Robinson Jr.	RB	Alabama
4	113	Percy Butler	FS	Louisiana
5	144	Sam Howell	QB	North Carolina
5	149	Cole Turner	TE	Nevada
7	230	Chris Paul	OG	Tulsa
7	240	Christian Holmes	CB	Oklahoma State

Undrafted free agents
Player	Position	College	Ref.
Josh Drayden	CB	California	
Jequez Ezzard	WR	Sam Houston State	
Ferrod Gardner	LB	Louisiana	
Curtis Hodges	TE	Arizona State	
Cole Kelley	QB	Southeastern Louisiana	
Kyric McGowan	WR	Georgia Tech	
Bryce Notree	LB	Southern Illinois	
Tyrese Robinson	OL	Oklahoma	
Armani Rogers	QB	Ohio	
Devin Taylor	CB	Bowling Green	
Tre Walker	LB	Idaho	
Drew White	LB	Notre Dame	

Draft trades

- Washington traded its first-round selection (11th overall pick) to New Orleans in exchange for a first, third, and fourth-round selection (16th, 98th, and 120th).
- Washington traded second and third-round selections (42nd and 73rd) to Indianapolis in exchange for quarterback Carson Wentz, second- and seventh-round selections (47th and 240th), and a conditional 2023 third-round selection.
- Washington traded fourth and sixth-round selections (120th and 189th) to Carolina in exchange for two fifth-round selections (144th and 149th).
- Washington received 2021 sixth- and seventh-round selections from Philadelphia in exchange for their 2022 fifth-round selection (154th).

== Staff ==
2022 Washington Commanders staff
Front office: Owner – Daniel Snyder; CEO – Tanya Snyder; President – Jason Wright; General manager – Martin Mayhew; Executive vice president of football/player personnel – Marty Hurney; Senior vice president of football administration – Rob Rogers; Senior director of player personnel – Eric Stokes; Director of pro personnel – Chris Polian; Director of college personnel – Tim Gribble; Senior advisor – Doug Williams; College scout – Paul Skansi; Head coaches: Head coach – Ron Rivera; Offensive coaches: Offensive coordinator – Scott Turner; Quarterbacks – Ken Zampese; Assistant quarterbacks/offensive quality control – Luke Del Rio; Running backs – Randy Jordan; Assistant running backs – Jennifer King; Wide receivers – Drew Terrell; Tight ends – Juan Castillo; Assistant tight ends – Todd Storm; Offensive line – John Matsko; Assistant offensive line – Travelle Wharton; Senior offensive assistant – Jim Hostler; Offensive assistant – Tyrae Reid Jr.	Defensive coaches: Defensive coordinator – Jack Del Rio; Defensive line – Jeff Zgonina; Assistant defensive line – Ryan Kerrigan; Linebackers – Steve Russ; Assistant linebackers/defensive quality control – Vincent Rivera; Defensive backs – Chris Harris; Assistant defensive backs – Brent Vieselmeyer and Richard Rodgers Sr.; Defensive quality control – Cristian Garcia; Special teams coaches: Special teams coordinator – Nate Kaczor; Assistant special teams – Ben Jacobs; Strength and conditioning: Head athletic trainer – Al Bellamy; Head strength and conditioning – Chad Englehart; Director of player performance – Brett Nenaber

== Roster ==
2022 Washington Commanders roster
Quarterbacks (QB): 4 Taylor Heinicke; 14 Sam Howell; 11 Carson Wentz; Running backs (RB): 32 Jaret Patterson; 8 Brian Robinson Jr.; 41 Jonathan Williams; Wide receivers (WR): 2 Dyami Brown; 1 Jahan Dotson; 17 Terry McLaurin; 15 Dax Milne; 10 Curtis Samuel; 89 Cam Sims; Tight ends (TE): 87 John Bates; 88 Armani Rogers; 82 Logan Thomas; 85 Cole Turner	Offensive linemen (OL): 62 Alex Akingbulu T; 76 Sam Cosmi T; 72 Charles Leno T; 78 Cornelius Lucas T; 60 Nick Martin C; 63 Wes Martin G; 68 Andrew Norwell G; 71 Wes Schweitzer C; 75 Chris Paul G; 53 Trai Turner G; Defensive linemen (DL): 93 Jonathan Allen DT; 64 David Bada DT; 97 Efe Obada DE; 94 Daron Payne DT; 79 Benning Potoa'e DT; 91 John Ridgeway III DT; 96 James Smith-Williams DE; 90 Montez Sweat DE; 58 Shaka Toney DE; 95 Casey Toohill DE; 99 Chase Young DE	Linebackers (LB): 46 Milo Eifler MLB; 50 Nate Gerry OLB; 47 Khaleke Hudson OLB; 51 David Mayo OLB; Defensive backs (DB): 35 Percy Butler FS; 31 Kamren Curl SS; 22 Darrick Forrest FS; 29 Kendall Fuller CB; 34 Christian Holmes CB; 36 Danny Johnson CB; 20 Bobby McCain FS; 39 Jeremy Reaves FS; 37 Rachad Wildgoose CB; Special teams (ST): 54 Camaron Cheeseman LS; 6 Joey Slye K; 5 Tress Way P	Practice squad: 30 Troy Apke CB; 48 Alex Armah FB; 38 Reggie Bonnafon RB; 56 William Bradley-King DE; 26 Corn Elder CB; 86 Alex Erickson WR; 38 DaMarcus Fields CB; 12 Jake Fromm QB; 48 Ferrod Gardner OLB; 74 Nolan Laufenberg G; 83 Kyric McGowan WR; 19 Marken Michel WR; 67 Aaron Monteiro T; 61 Keaton Sutherland G; Reserve: 59 Jon Bostic OLB (IR); 40 Tariq Castro-Fields CB (IR); 77 Saahdiq Charles G (IR); 52 Jamin Davis MLB (IR); 24 Antonio Gibson RB (IR); 45 De'Jon Harris MLB (IR); 80 Curtis Hodges TE (IR); 55 Cole Holcomb MLB (IR); 69 Tyler Larsen C (IR); 98 Phidarian Mathis DT (IR); 23 J. D. McKissic RB (IR); 73 Chase Roullier C (IR); 25 Benjamin St-Juste CB (IR); Rookies in italics 53 active, 20 reserve, 14 practice squad

== Schedule ==
=== Preseason ===
Week	Date	Opponent	Result	Record	Venue	Recap
1	August 13	Carolina Panthers	**L** 21–23	0–1	FedExField	Recap
2	August 20	at Kansas City Chiefs	**L** 14–24	0–2	Arrowhead Stadium	Recap
3	August 27	at Baltimore Ravens	**L** 15–17	0–3	M&T Bank Stadium	Recap

=== Regular season ===
Week	Date	Opponent	Result	Record	Venue	Recap
1	September 11	Jacksonville Jaguars	**W** 28–22	1–0	FedExField	Recap
2	September 18	at Detroit Lions	**L** 27–36	1–1	Ford Field	Recap
3	September 25	**Philadelphia Eagles**	**L** 8–24	1–2	FedExField	Recap
4	October 2	at **Dallas Cowboys**	**L** 10–25	1–3	AT&T Stadium	Recap
5	October 9	Tennessee Titans	**L** 17–21	1–4	FedExField	Recap
6	October 13	at Chicago Bears	**W** 12–7	2–4	Soldier Field	Recap
7	October 23	Green Bay Packers	**W** 23–21	3–4	FedExField	Recap
8	October 30	at Indianapolis Colts	**W** 17–16	4–4	Lucas Oil Stadium	Recap
9	November 6	Minnesota Vikings	**L** 17–20	4–5	FedExField	Recap
10	November 14	at **Philadelphia Eagles**	**W** 32–21	5–5	Lincoln Financial Field	Recap
11	November 20	at Houston Texans	**W** 23–10	6–5	NRG Stadium	Recap
12	November 27	Atlanta Falcons	**W** 19–13	7–5	FedExField	Recap
13	December 4	at **New York Giants**	**T** 20–20 (OT)	7–5–1	MetLife Stadium	Recap
14	Bye					
15	December 18	**New York Giants**	**L** 12–20	7–6–1	FedExField	Recap
16	December 24	at San Francisco 49ers	**L** 20–37	7–7–1	Levi's Stadium	Recap
17	January 1	Cleveland Browns	**L** 10–24	7–8–1	FedExField	Recap
18	January 8	**Dallas Cowboys**	**W** 26–6	8–8–1	FedExField	Recap

Note: Intra-division opponents are in bold text.

=== Game summaries ===
==== Week 1: vs. Jacksonville Jaguars ====
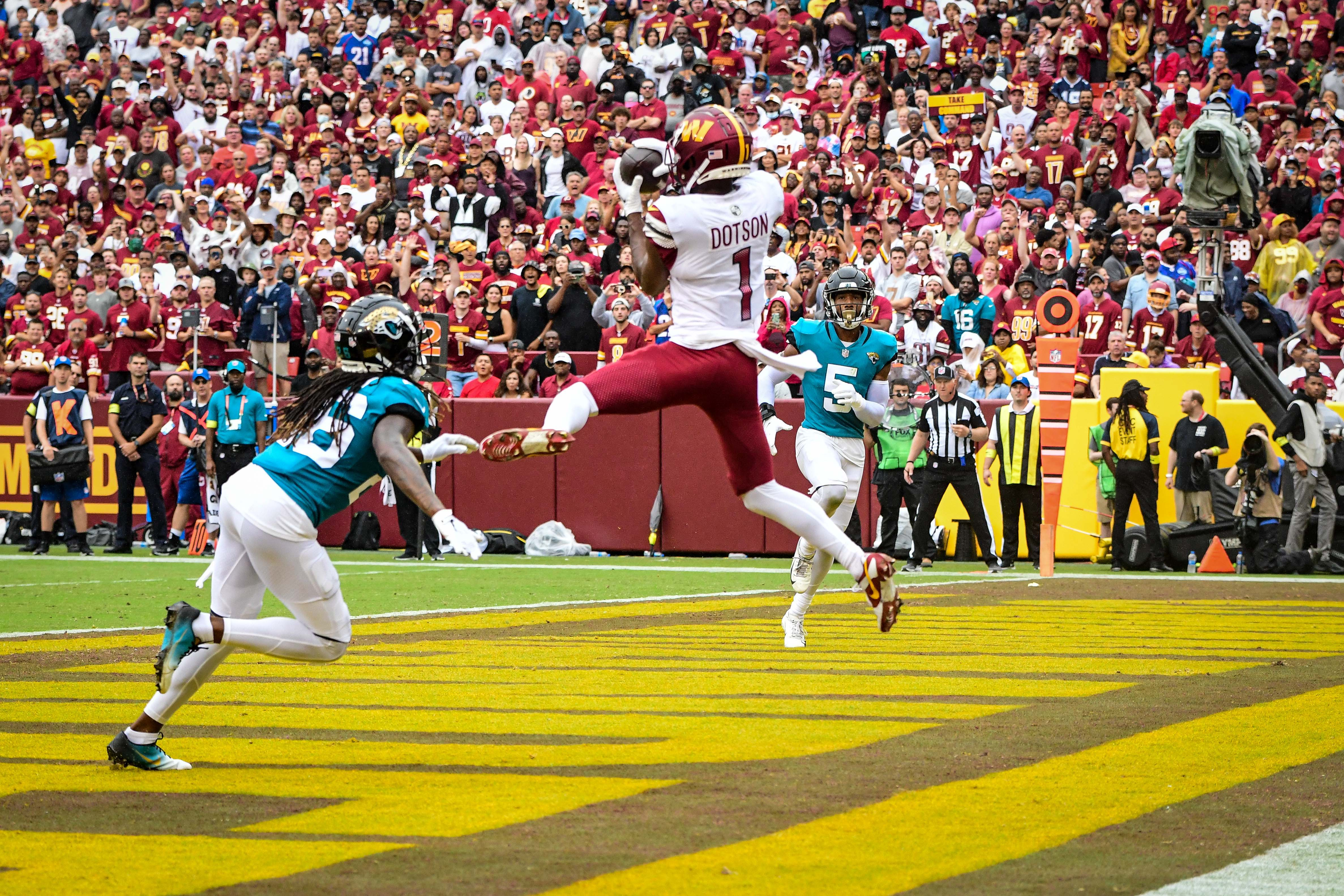
Washington vs. the Jacksonville Jaguars

Week 1: Jacksonville Jaguars at Washington Commanders – Game summary

Quarter	1	2	3	4	Total
Jaguars	3	0	9	10	**22**
**Commanders**	7	7	0	14	**28**

at FedExField, Landover, Maryland

- Date: September 11
- Game time: 1:00 p.m. EDT
- Game weather: Cloudy, 74 °F (23 °C)
- Game attendance: 58,192
- Referee: Tra Blake
- TV announcers (Fox): Chris Myers, Robert Smith and Jen Hale
- Recap, Game Book

Game information

**First quarter**

- JAX – Riley Patterson 33-yard field goal, 11:57. Jaguars 3–0. **Drive: 7 plays, 60 yards, 3:03.**
- WAS – Curtis Samuel 3-yard pass from Carson Wentz (Joey Slye kick), 7:36. Commanders 7–3. **Drive: 8 plays, 74 yards, 4:21.**

**Second quarter**

- WAS – Jahan Dotson 7-yard pass from Carson Wentz (Joey Slye kick), 11:47. Commanders 14–3. **Drive: 14 plays, 71 yards, 7:31.**

**Third quarter**

- JAX – James Robinson 3-yard pass from Trevor Lawrence (pass failed), 8:50. Commanders 14–9. **Drive: 6 plays, 80 yards, 3:08.**
- JAX – Riley Patterson 43-yard field goal, 1:16. Commanders 14–12. **Drive: 11 plays, 55 yards, 5:29.**

**Fourth quarter**

- JAX – Riley Patterson 45-yard field goal, 12:04. Jaguars 15–14. **Drive: 6 plays, 19 yards, 2:15.**
- JAX – James Robinson 11-yard run (Riley Patterson kick), 11:45. Jaguars 22–14. **Drive: 1 play, 11 yards, 0:07.**
- WAS – Terry McLaurin 49-yard pass from Carson Wentz (pass failed), 9:36. Jaguars 22–20. **Drive: 4 plays, 78 yards, 2:09.**
- WAS – Jahan Dotson 24-yard pass from Carson Wentz (Wentz–McKissic pass), 1:46. Commanders 28–22. **Drive: 13 plays, 90 yards, 5:02.**

**Top passers**

- JAX – Trevor Lawrence – 24/42, 275 yards, TD, INT
- WAS – Carson Wentz – 27/41, 313 yards, 4 TD, 2 INT

**Top rushers**

- JAX – James Robinson – 11 rushes, 66 yards, TD
- WAS – Antonio Gibson – 14 rushes, 58 yards

**Top receivers**

- JAX – Christian Kirk – 6 receptions, 117 yards
- WAS – Antonio Gibson – 7 receptions, 72 yards

In their first ever game as the Washington Commanders, Carson Wentz threw for 313 yards and four touchdowns, including two to first-round rookie WR Jahan Dotson, who was named Pepsi NFL Rookie of the Week. Washington opened a 14–3 half time lead thanks to TD's from Curtis Samuel and Dotson. The Jaguars then scored 19 unanswered points thanks to two TD's from James Robinson and a couple of field goals. This was aided by two interceptions thrown by Wentz on consecutive pass attempts, the second caught by 2022 first overall draft pick Travon Walker. Wentz responded by leading the Commanders on two TD drives to win the game 28–22.

==== Week 2: at Detroit Lions ====
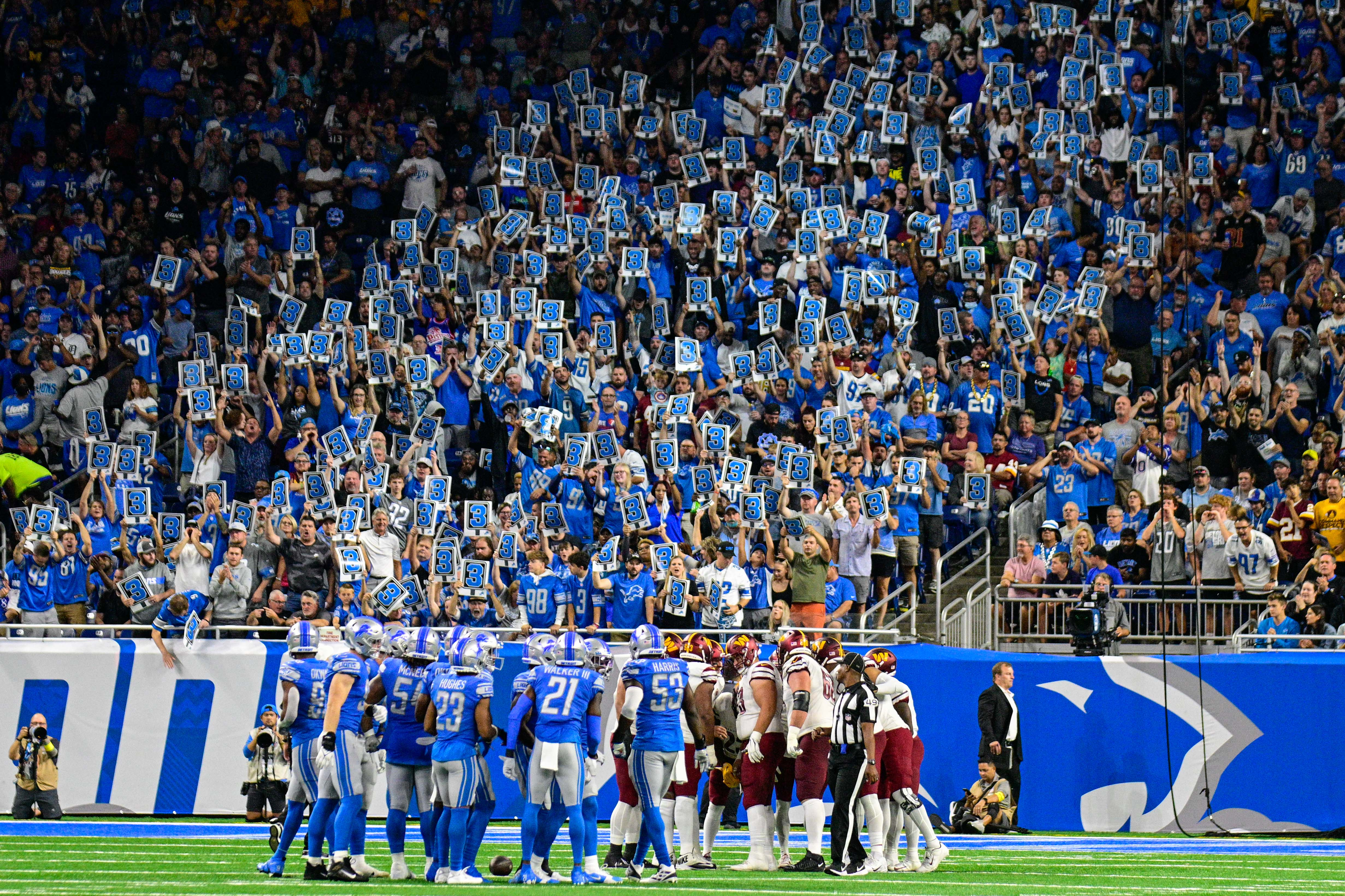
Washington vs. the Detroit Lions

Week 2: Washington Commanders at Detroit Lions – Game summary

Quarter	1	2	3	4	Total
Commanders	0	0	15	12	**27**
**Lions**	12	10	7	7	**36**

at Ford Field, Detroit, Michigan

- Date: September 18
- Game time: 1:00 p.m. EDT
- Game weather: None (indoor stadium)
- Game attendance: 57,687
- Referee: Bill Vinovich
- TV announcers (Fox): Kenny Albert, Jonathan Vilma and Shannon Spake
- Recap, Game Book

Game information

**First quarter**

- DET – Austin Seibert 35-yard field goal, 8:06. Lions 3–0. **Drive: 7 plays, 63 yards, 3:26.**
- DET – Charles Harris safety, 3:17. Lions 5–0.
- DET – Amon-Ra St. Brown 13-yard pass from Jared Goff (Austin Seibert kick), 1:40. Lions 12–0. **Drive: 4 plays, 31 yards, 1:37.**

**Second quarter**

- DET – Austin Seibert 48-yard field goal, 13:47. Lions 15–0. **Drive: 5 plays, 28 yards, 1:14.**
- DET – Josh Reynolds 3-yard pass from Jared Goff (Austin Seibert kick), 6:43. Lions 22–0. **Drive: 9 plays, 77 yards, 5:27.**

**Third quarter**

- WSH – Curtis Samuel 15-yard pass from Carson Wentz (Joey Slye kick), 12:58. Lions 22–7. **Drive: 5 plays, 64 yards, 2:02.**
- WSH – Logan Thomas 20-yard pass from Carson Wentz (Carson Wentz–Jahan Dotson pass), 2:58. Lions 22–15. **Drive: 7 plays, 94 yards, 4:20.**
- DET – D'Andre Swift 22-yard pass from Jared Goff (Austin Seibert kick), 1:28. Lions 29–15. **Drive: 4 plays, 75 yards, 1:30.**

**Fourth quarter**

- WSH – Antonio Gibson 1-yard run (pass failed), 10:39. Lions 29–21. **Drive: 12 plays, 83 yards, 5:49.**
- DET – Amon-Ra St. Brown 11-yard pass from Jared Goff (Austin Seibert kick), 7:00. Lions 36–21. **Drive: 6 plays, 70 yards, 3:39.**
- WSH – Jahan Dotson 1-yard pass from Carson Wentz (kick failed), 1:56. Lions 36–27. **Drive: 14 plays, 76 yards, 5:04.**

**Top passers**

- WSH – Carson Wentz – 30/46, 337 yards, 3 TD, INT
- DET – Jared Goff – 20/34, 256 yards, 4 TD

**Top rushers**

- WSH – Antonio Gibson – 14 rushes, 28 yards, TD
- DET – Amon-Ra St. Brown – 2 rushes, 68 yards

**Top receivers**

- WSH – Curtis Samuel – 7 receptions, 78 yards, TD
- DET – Amon-Ra St. Brown – 9 receptions, 116 yards, 2 TD

The Commanders 22–0 halftime deficit was too much to overcome despite their valiant efforts in the second half. Jahan Dotson scored a touchdown for the second consecutive game, but Joey Slye missed the extra point to make it a one-possession game and sealed the victory for the Lions. Carson Wentz threw for 337 yards and 3 touchdowns. Lions wide receiver Amon-Ra St. Brown had two touchdown catches.

==== Week 3: vs. Philadelphia Eagles ====
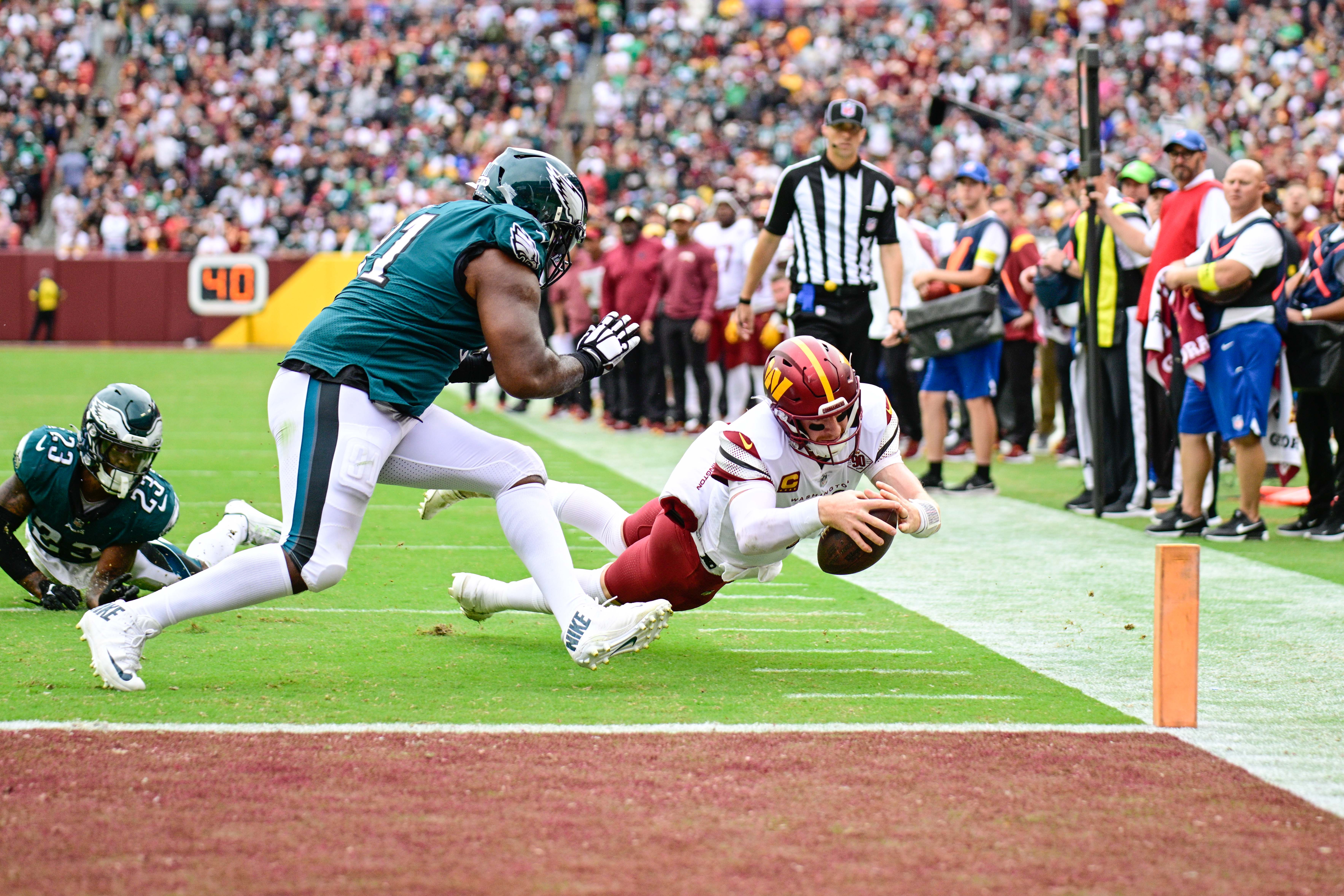
Washington vs. the Philadelphia Eagles

Week 3: Philadelphia Eagles at Washington Commanders – Game summary

Quarter	1	2	3	4	Total
**Eagles**	0	24	0	0	**24**
Commanders	0	0	0	8	**8**

at FedExField, Landover, Maryland

- Date: September 25
- Game time: 1:00 p.m. EDT
- Game weather: Sunny, 72 °F (22 °C)
- Game attendance: 64,426
- Referee: Ronald Torbert
- TV announcers (Fox): Adam Amin, Mark Schlereth and Kristina Pink
- Recap, Game Book

Game information

**First quarter**

- No scoring plays.

**Second quarter**

- PHI – Jake Elliott 32-yard field goal, 14:53. Eagles 3–0. **Drive: 8 plays, 64 yards, 3:07.**
- PHI – Dallas Goedert 23-yard pass from Jalen Hurts (Jake Elliott kick), 13:18. Eagles 10–0. **Drive: 2 plays, 24 yards, 0:45.**
- PHI – A. J. Brown 9-yard pass from Jalen Hurts (Jake Elliott kick), 2:56. Eagles 17–0. **Drive: 6 plays, 64 yards, 2:49.**
- PHI – DeVonta Smith 2-yard pass from Jalen Hurts (Jake Elliott kick), 0:00. Eagles 24–0. **Drive: 1 play, 88 yards, 1:57.**

**Third quarter**

- No scoring plays.

**Fourth quarter**

- WSH – Boston Scott tackled in end zone by Daron Payne for a Safety, 14:06. Eagles 24–2. **Drive: 1 play, -1 yards, 0:04.**
- WSH – Antonio Gibson 1-yard run (pass failed), 1:55. Eagles 24–8. **Drive: 12 plays, 87 yards, 3:10.**

**Top passers**

- PHI – Jalen Hurts – 22/35, 340 yards, 3 TD
- WSH – Carson Wentz – 25/43, 211 yards

**Top rushers**

- PHI – Miles Sanders – 15 rushes, 46 yards
- WSH – Antonio Gibson – 12 rushes, 38 yards, TD

**Top receivers**

- PHI – DeVonta Smith – 8 receptions, 169 yards, TD
- WSH – Terry McLaurin – 6 receptions, 102 yards

In his first game against the Eagles since being traded away from them, Carson Wentz was sacked nine times and the Commanders had only 47 yards of total offense and trailed 24–0 at halftime. Daron Payne tacked Boston Scott for a safety to make the score 24–2. Antonio Gibson scored a touchdown in the final two minutes to make the final score 24–8.

==== Week 4: at Dallas Cowboys ====
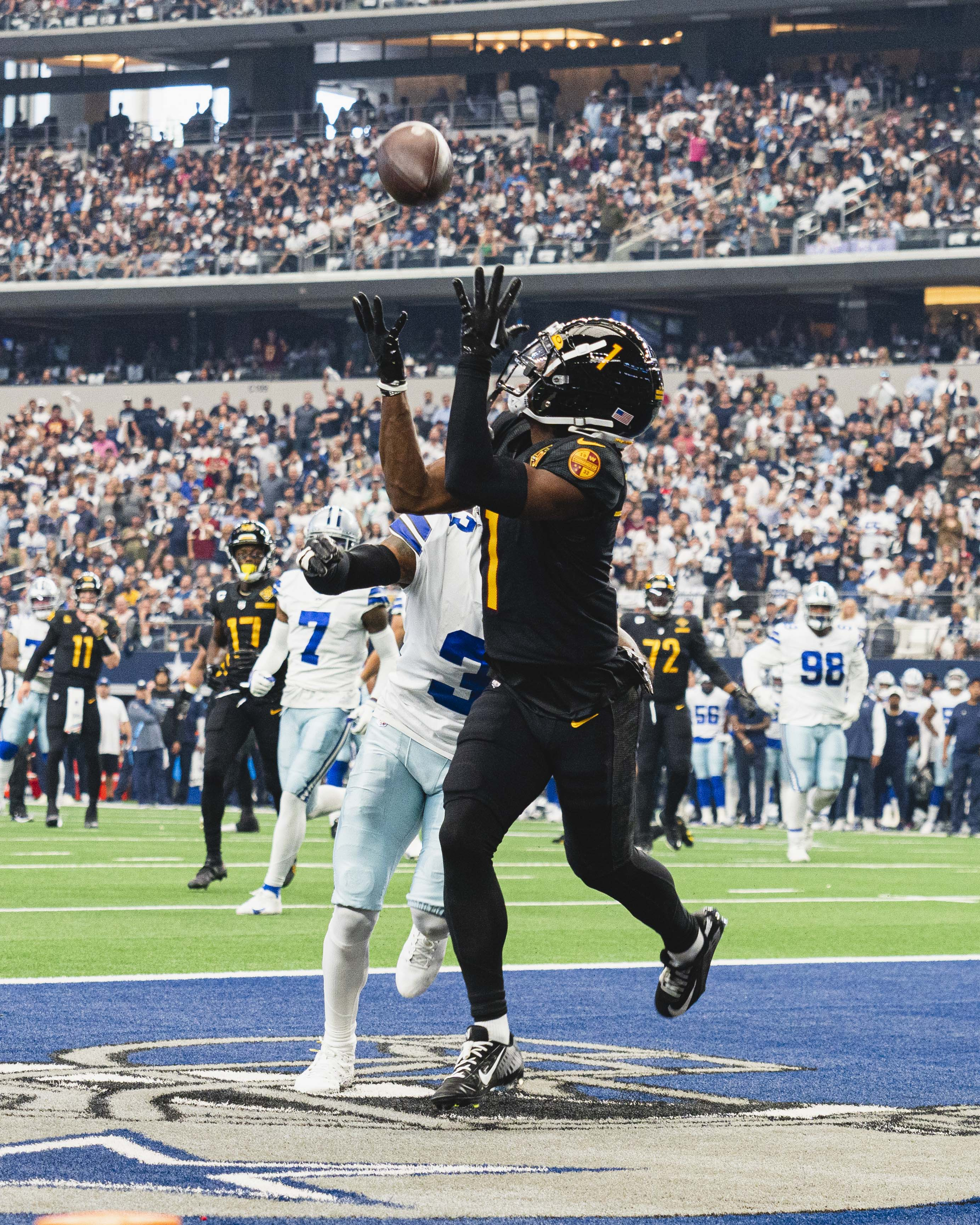
Washington vs. the Dallas Cowboys

Week 4: Washington Commanders at Dallas Cowboys – Game summary

Quarter	1	2	3	4	Total
Commanders	0	7	3	0	**10**
**Cowboys**	3	9	3	10	**25**

at AT&T Stadium, Arlington, Texas

- Date: October 2
- Game time: 1:00 p.m. EDT/12:00 p.m. CDT
- Game weather: None (retractable roof closed)
- Game attendance: 92,946
- Referee: Shawn Smith
- TV announcers (Fox): Kevin Burkhardt, Greg Olsen, Erin Andrews and Tom Rinaldi
- Recap, Game Book

Game information

**First quarter**

- DAL – Brett Maher 53-yard field goal, 11:34. Cowboys 3–0. **Drive: 7 plays, 40 yards, 3:26.**

**Second quarter**

- DAL – Brett Maher 45-yard field goal, 14:56. Cowboys 6–0. **Drive: 7 plays, 60 yards, 2:48.**
- WAS – Jahan Dotson 10-yard pass from Carson Wentz (Joey Slye kick), 7:05. Commanders 7–6. **Drive: 7 plays, 65 yards, 3:35.**
- DAL – Michael Gallup 9-yard pass from Cooper Rush (kick blocked), 1:04. Cowboys 12–7. **Drive: 15 plays, 75 yards, 6:01.**

**Third quarter**

- DAL – Brett Maher 28-yard field goal, 4:56. Cowboys 15–7. **Drive: 5 plays, 52 yards, 2:52.**
- WAS – Joey Slye 45-yard field goal, 1:45. Cowboys 15–10. **Drive: 8 plays, 48 yards, 3:29.**

**Fourth quarter**

- DAL – CeeDee Lamb 30-yard pass from Cooper Rush (Brett Maher kick), 14:54. Cowboys 22–10. **Drive: 3 plays, 75 yards, 1:33.**
- DAL – Brett Maher 29-yard field goal, 3:51. Cowboys 25–10. **Drive: 4 plays, 9 yards, 1:38.**

**Top passers**

- WAS – Carson Wentz – 25/42, 170 yards, TD, 2 INT
- DAL – Cooper Rush – 15/27, 223 yards, 2 TD

**Top rushers**

- WAS – Antonio Gibson – 13 rushes, 49 yards
- DAL – Ezekiel Elliott – 19 rushes, 49 yards

**Top receivers**

- WAS – Logan Thomas – 5 receptions, 19 yards
- DAL – CeeDee Lamb – 6 receptions, 97 yards, TD

==== Week 5: vs. Tennessee Titans ====
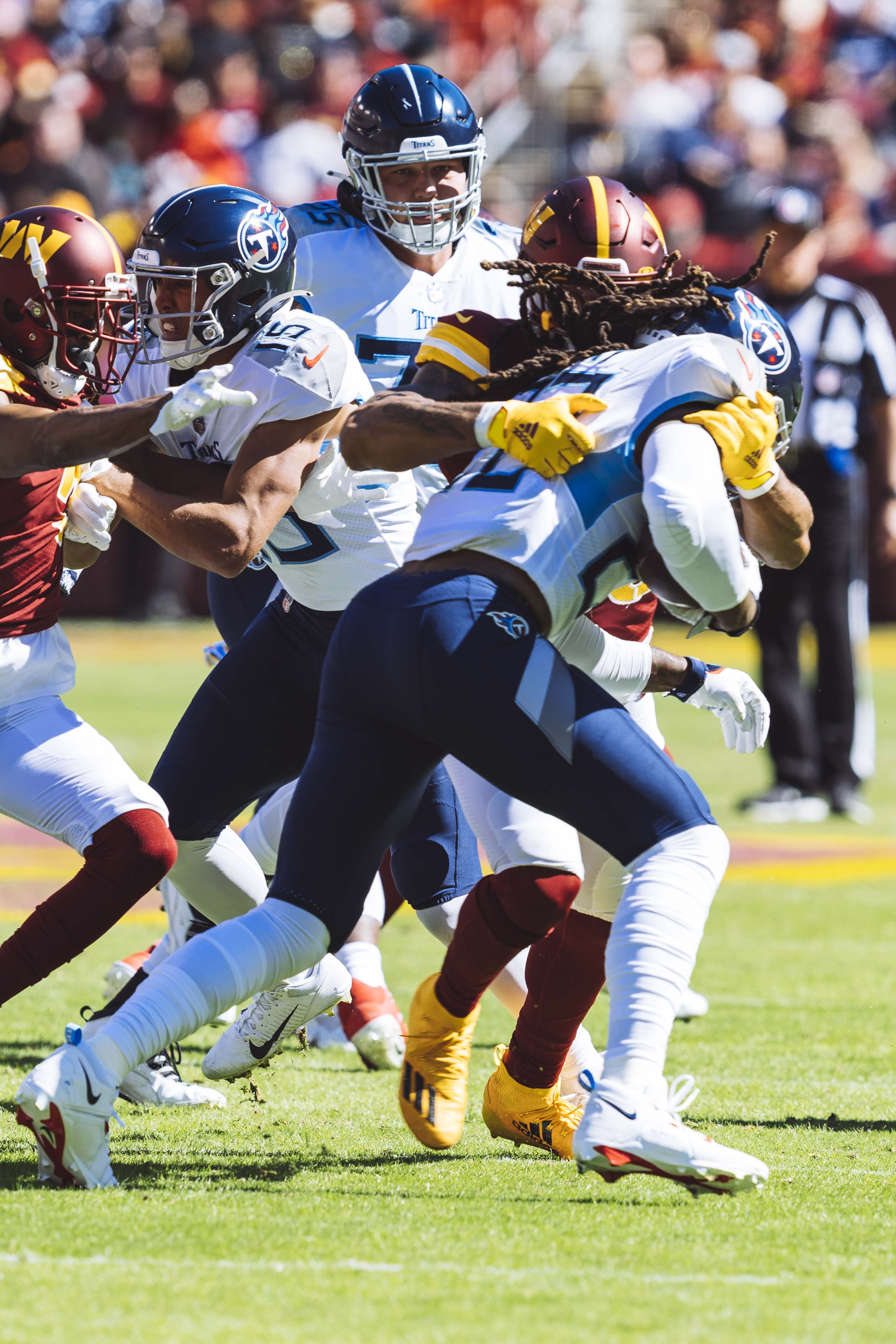
Washington vs. the Tennessee Titans

Week 5: Tennessee Titans at Washington Commanders – Game summary

Quarter	1	2	3	4	Total
**Titans**	7	7	7	0	**21**
Commanders	3	7	7	0	**17**

at FedExField, Landover, Maryland

- Date: October 9
- Game time: 1:00 p.m. EDT
- Game weather: Sunny, 61 °F (16 °C)
- Game attendance: 51,836
- Referee: Land Clark
- TV announcers (CBS): Andrew Catalon, James Lofton and Amanda Renner
- Recap, Game Book

Game information

**First quarter**

- TEN – Dontrell Hilliard 13-yard pass from Ryan Tannehill (Randy Bullock kick), 3:58. Titans 7–0. **Drive: 6 plays, 52 yards, 2:32.**
- WAS – Joey Slye 50-yard field goal, 0:26. Titans 7–3. **Drive: 7 plays, 43 yards, 3:32.**

**Second quarter**

- WAS – Dyami Brown 75-yard pass from Carson Wentz (Joey Slye kick), 13:56. Commanders 10–7. **Drive: 1 play, 75 yards, 0:10.**
- TEN – Derrick Henry 1-yard run (Randy Bullock kick), 0:17. Titans 14–10. **Drive: 15 plays, 81 yards, 6:57.**

**Third quarter**

- WAS – Dyami Brown 30-yard pass from Carson Wentz (Joey Slye kick), 4:36. Commanders 17–14. **Drive: 6 plays, 80 yards, 3:14.**
- TEN – Derrick Henry 1-yard run (Randy Bullock kick), 1:03. Titans 21–17. **Drive: 7 plays, 75 yards, 3:33.**

**Fourth quarter**

- No scoring plays.

**Top passers**

- TEN – Ryan Tannehill – 15/25, 181 yards, TD
- WAS – Carson Wentz – 25/38, 359 yards, 2 TD, INT

**Top rushers**

- TEN – Derrick Henry – 28 rushes, 102 yards, 2 TD
- WAS – Brian Robinson Jr. – 9 rushes, 22 yards

**Top receivers**

- TEN – Nick Westbrook-Ikhine – 2 receptions, 72 yards
- WAS – Dyami Brown – 2 receptions, 105 yards, 2 TD

==== Week 6: at Chicago Bears ====
Week 6: Washington Commanders at Chicago Bears – Game summary

Quarter	1	2	3	4	Total
**Commanders**	0	3	0	9	**12**
Bears	0	0	7	0	**7**

at Soldier Field, Chicago, Illinois

- Date: October 13
- Game time: 8:15 p.m. EDT/7:15 p.m. CDT
- Game weather: Cloudy, 46 °F (8 °C)
- Game attendance: 61,873
- Referee: Adrian Hill
- TV announcers (WTTG/Prime Video): Al Michaels, Kirk Herbstreit and Kaylee Hartung
- Recap, Game Book

Game information

**First quarter**

- No scoring plays.

**Second quarter**

- WAS – Joey Slye 38-yard field goal, 0:46. Commanders 3–0. **Drive: 9 plays, 57 yards, 1:37.**

**Third quarter**

- CHI – Dante Pettis 40-yard pass from Justin Fields (Cairo Santos kick), 7:16. Bears 7–3. **Drive: 9 plays, 94 yards, 3:57.**

**Fourth quarter**

- WAS – Joey Slye 28-yard field goal, 14:51. Bears 7–6. **Drive: 13 plays, 65 yards, 7:25.**
- WAS – Brian Robinson Jr. 1-yard run (pass failed), 7:21. Commanders 12–7. **Drive: 2 plays, 6 yards, 0:45.**

**Top passers**

- WAS – Carson Wentz – 12/22, 99 yards
- CHI – Justin Fields – 14/27, 190 yards, TD, INT

**Top rushers**

- WAS – Brian Robinson Jr. – 17 rushes, 60 yards, TD
- CHI – Justin Fields – 12 rushes, 88 yards

**Top receivers**

- WAS – Terry McLaurin – 3 receptions, 41 yards
- CHI – Dante Pettis – 4 receptions, 84 yards

==== Week 7: vs. Green Bay Packers ====
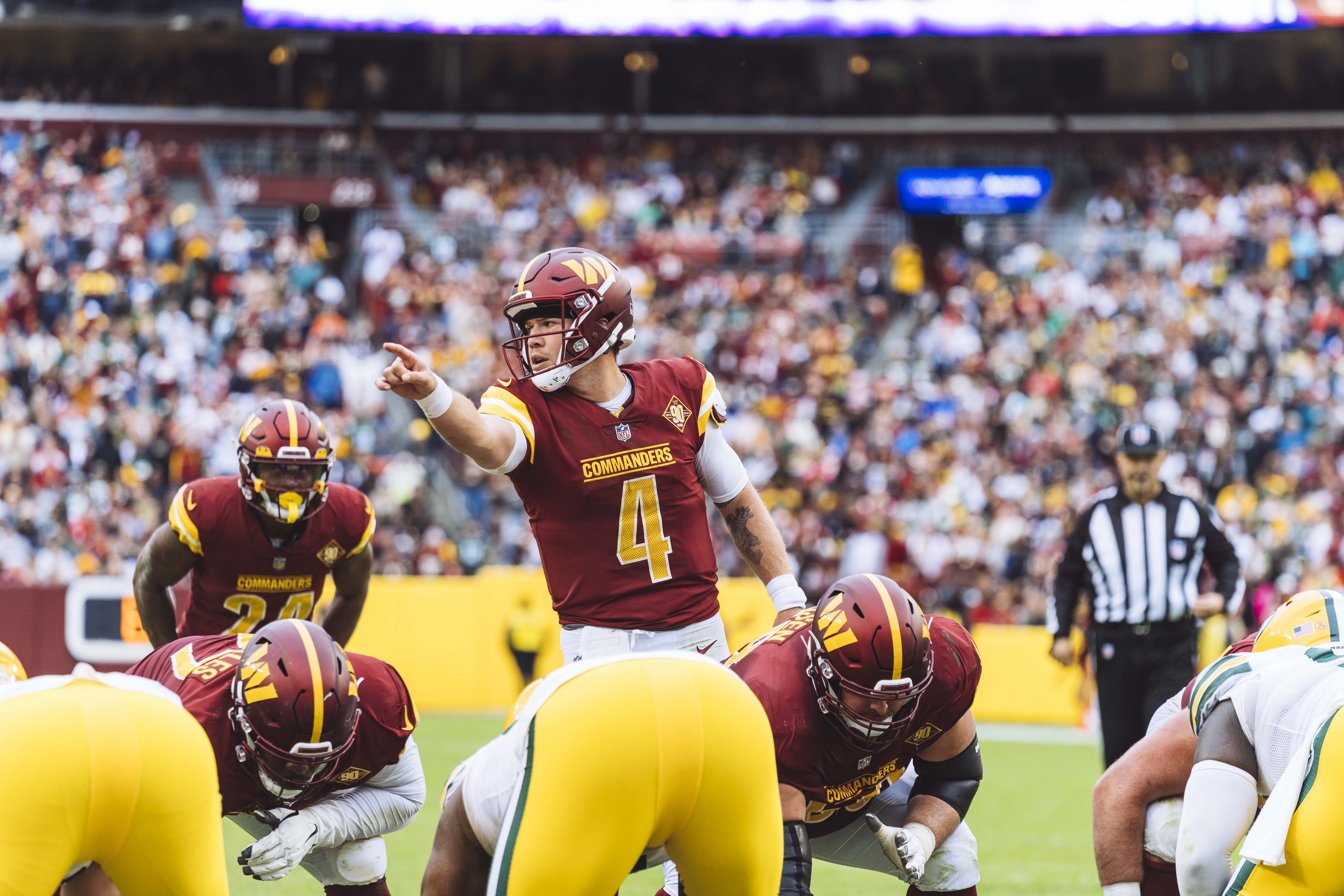
Washington vs. the Green Bay Packers

Week 7: Green Bay Packers at Washington Commanders – Game summary

Quarter	1	2	3	4	Total
Packers	7	7	0	7	**21**
**Commanders**	3	7	10	3	**23**

at FedExField, Landover, Maryland

- Date: October 23
- Game time: 1:00 p.m. EDT
- Game weather: Cloudy, 62 °F (17 °C)
- Game attendance: 60,427
- Referee: Clay Martin
- TV announcers (Fox): Adam Amin, Daryl Johnston and Pam Oliver
- Recap, Game Book

Game information

**First quarter**

- GB – Aaron Jones 4-yard pass from Aaron Rodgers (Mason Crosby kick), 6:38. Packers 7–0. **Drive: 7 plays, 42 yards, 4:22.**
- WAS – Joey Slye 22-yard field goal, 2:04. Packers 7–3. **Drive: 6 plays, 14 yards, 2:51.**

**Second quarter**

- GB – De'Vondre Campbell 63-yard interception return (Mason Crosby kick), 13:29. Packers 14–3.
- WAS – Antonio Gibson 9-yard pass from Taylor Heinicke (Joey Slye kick), 7:21. Packers 14–10. **Drive: 12 plays, 83 yards, 6:08.**

**Third quarter**

- WAS – Terry McLaurin 37-yard pass from Taylor Heinicke (Joey Slye kick), 11:49. Commanders 17–14. **Drive: 5 plays, 74 yards, 3:11.**
- WAS – Joey Slye 31-yard field goal, 0:08. Commanders 20–14. **Drive: 16 plays, 72 yards, 8:48.**

**Fourth quarter**

- WAS – Joey Slye 19-yard field goal, 6:40. Commanders 23–14. **Drive: 9 plays, 61 yards, 4:42.**
- GB – Aaron Jones 21-yard pass from Aaron Rodgers (Mason Crosby kick), 3:26. Commanders 23–21. **Drive: 8 plays, 75 yards, 3:14.**

**Top passers**

- GB – Aaron Rodgers – 23/35, 194 yards, 2 TD
- WAS – Taylor Heinicke – 20/33, 201 yards, 2 TD, INT

**Top rushers**

- GB – Aaron Jones – 8 rushes, 23 yards
- WAS – Brian Robinson Jr. – 20 rushes, 73 yards

**Top receivers**

- GB – Allen Lazard – 6 receptions, 55 yards
- WAS – Terry McLaurin – 5 receptions, 73 yards, TD

==== Week 8: at Indianapolis Colts ====
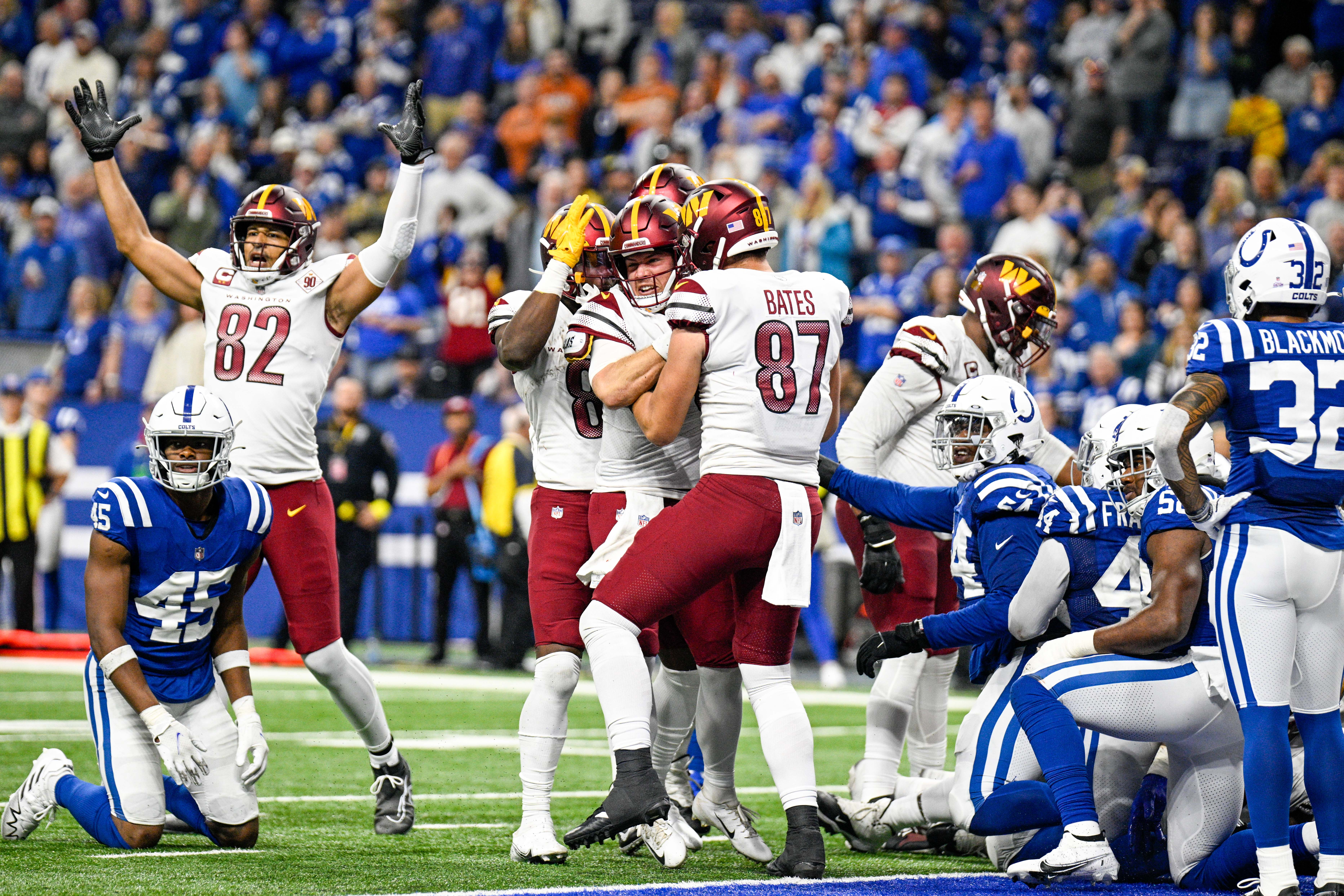
Washington vs. the Indianapolis Colts

Week 8: Washington Commanders at Indianapolis Colts – Game summary

Quarter	1	2	3	4	Total
**Commanders**	0	7	0	10	**17**
Colts	0	3	3	10	**16**

at Lucas Oil Stadium, Indianapolis, Indiana

- Date: October 30
- Game time: 4:25 p.m. EDT
- Game weather: None (retractable roof closed)
- Game attendance: 65,515
- Referee: Craig Wrolstad
- TV announcers (Fox): Brandon Gaudin, Robert Smith and Jen Hale
- Recap, Game Book

Game information

**First quarter**

- No scoring plays.

**Second quarter**

- IND – Chase McLaughlin 46-yard field goal, 14:13. Colts 3–0. **Drive: 11 plays, 64 yards, 6:04.**
- WAS – Antonio Gibson 9-yard pass from Taylor Heinicke (Joey Slye kick), 10:55. Commanders 7–3. **Drive: 6 plays, 75 yards, 3:18.**

**Third quarter**

- IND – Chase McLaughlin 39-yard field goal, 7:13. Commanders 7–6. **Drive: 10 plays, 29 yards, 4:58.**

**Fourth quarter**

- IND – Chase McLaughlin 20-yard field goal, 12:32. Colts 9–7. **Drive: 7 plays, 60 yards, 3:40.**
- IND – Nyheim Hines 6-yard run (Chase McLaughlin kick), 11:12. Colts 16–7. **Drive: 2 plays, 24 yards, 1:11.**
- WAS – Joey Slye 28-yard field goal, 4:55. Colts 16–10. **Drive: 12 plays, 82 yards, 6:17.**
- WAS – Taylor Heinicke 1-yard run (Joey Slye kick), 0:22. Commanders 17–16. **Drive: 9 plays, 89 yards, 2:17.**

**Top passers**

- WAS – Taylor Heinicke – 23/31, 279 yards, INT
- IND – Sam Ehlinger – 17/23, 207 yards

**Top rushers**

- WAS – Taylor Heinicke – 6 rushes, 29 yards, TD
- IND – Jonathan Taylor – 16 rushes, 76 yards

**Top receivers**

- WAS – Terry McLaurin – 6 receptions, 113 yards
- IND – Alec Pierce – 3 receptions, 65 yards

Washington overcame a 16–7 fourth quarter deficit to spoil Indianapolis Colts quarterback Sam Ehlinger's first career NFL start. Late in the fourth quarter with Washington trailing 16–10, Taylor Heinicke led a 9-play, 89-yard touchdown drive to win the game. This included a 33-yard completion to Terry McLaurin, who won a contested ball against Stephon Gillmore to set up Washington on the Indianapolis 1-yard line. Heinicke would then run a quarterback sneak to score the winning touchdown. Washington's defense also forced two fumbles on Ehlinger and Jonathan Taylor.

==== Week 9: vs. Minnesota Vikings ====
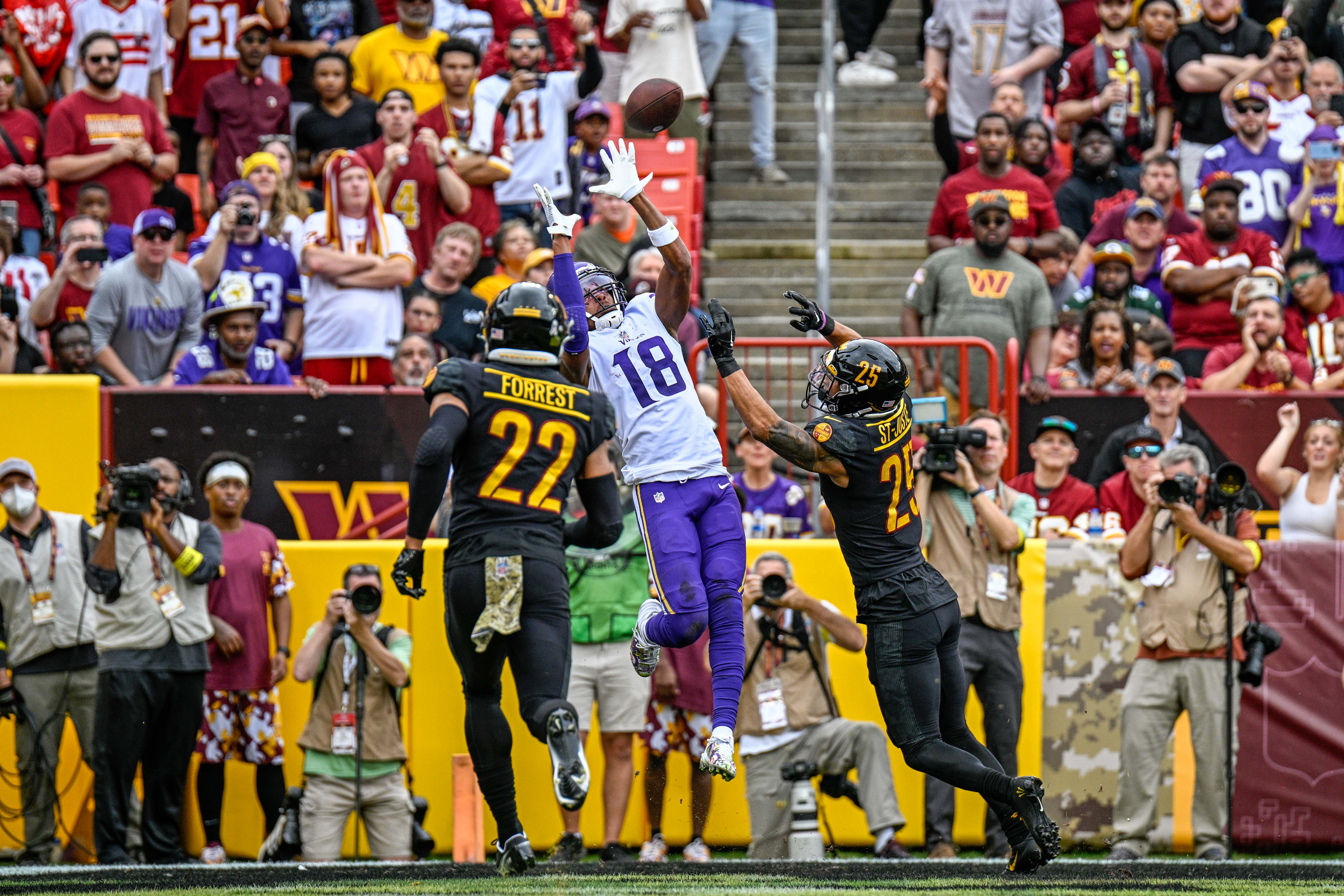
Washington vs. the Minnesota Vikings

Week 9: Minnesota Vikings at Washington Commanders – Game summary

Quarter	1	2	3	4	Total
**Vikings**	7	0	0	13	**20**
Commanders	0	3	7	7	**17**

at FedExField, Landover, Maryland

- Date: November 6
- Game time: 1:00 p.m. EST
- Game weather: Cloudy, 76 °F (24 °C)
- Game attendance: 58,651
- Referee: Jerome Boger
- TV announcers (Fox): Adam Amin, Mark Schlereth and Kristina Pink
- Recap, Game Book

Game information

**First quarter**

- MIN – Justin Jefferson 9-yard pass from Kirk Cousins (Greg Joseph kick), 9:17. Vikings 7–0. **Drive: 9 plays, 78 yards, 5:43.**

**Second quarter**

- WAS – Joey Slye 44-yard field goal, 0:37. Vikings 7–3. **Drive: 11 plays, 37 yards, 2:07.**

**Third quarter**

- WAS – Curtis Samuel 49-yard pass from Taylor Heinicke (Joey Slye kick), 14:01. Commanders 10–7. **Drive: 2 plays, 52 yards, 0:59.**

**Fourth quarter**

- WAS – Dax Milne 6-yard pass from Taylor Heinicke (Joey Slye kick), 14:14. Commanders 17–7. **Drive: 10 plays, 78 yards, 5:18.**
- MIN – Greg Joseph 25-yard field goal, 10:46. Commanders 17–10. **Drive: 9 plays, 68 yards, 3:28.**
- MIN – Dalvin Cook 12-yard pass from Kirk Cousins (Greg Joseph kick), 7:46. Tied 17–17. **Drive: 2 plays, 12 yards, 0:10.**
- MIN – Greg Joseph 28-yard field goal, 0:12. Vikings 20–17. **Drive: 15 plays, 44 yards, 6:00.**

**Top passers**

- MIN – Kirk Cousins – 22/40, 265 yards, 2 TD, INT
- WAS – Taylor Heinicke – 15/28, 149 yards, 2 TD, INT

**Top rushers**

- MIN – Dalvin Cook – 17 rushes, 47 yards
- WAS – Brian Robinson Jr. – 13 rushes, 44 yards

**Top receivers**

- MIN – Justin Jefferson – 7 receptions, 115 yards, TD
- WAS – Curtis Samuel – 3 receptions, 65 yards, TD

Vikings quarterback Kirk Cousins made his first return to Washington since leaving the team following the 2017 season. Cousins previously played for Washington, then known as the Redskins, from 2012 to 2017, was their primary starter from 2015 to 2017 and earned a Pro Bowl berth once in that span. Vikings head coach and former Redskins quarterbacks coach/offensive coordinator Kevin O'Connell previously mentored Cousins in the nation's capital during the 2017 season, Cousin's final season in the burgundy and gold. Washington was unable to hold onto a 17–7 fourth quarter lead as Kirk Cousins led the Minnesota Vikings to a 20–17 victory on a last-second Greg Joseph field goal. In the fourth quarter, Taylor Heinicke threw a critical interception to safety Harrison Smith that set up Minnesota deep in Washington territory. This led to Cousins throwing a touchdown to Dalvin Cook to tie the game at 17. After Washington failed to score on their next drive, Cousins led the Vikings into the Washington red zone. On fourth and goal with less than 2 minutes in the game, the Vikings took the lead on a field goal, but Washington backup defensive lineman John Ridgeway III committed a personal foul that granted the Vikings a first down. The Vikings then kicked a winning field goal with less than 15 seconds left.

==== Week 10: at Philadelphia Eagles ====
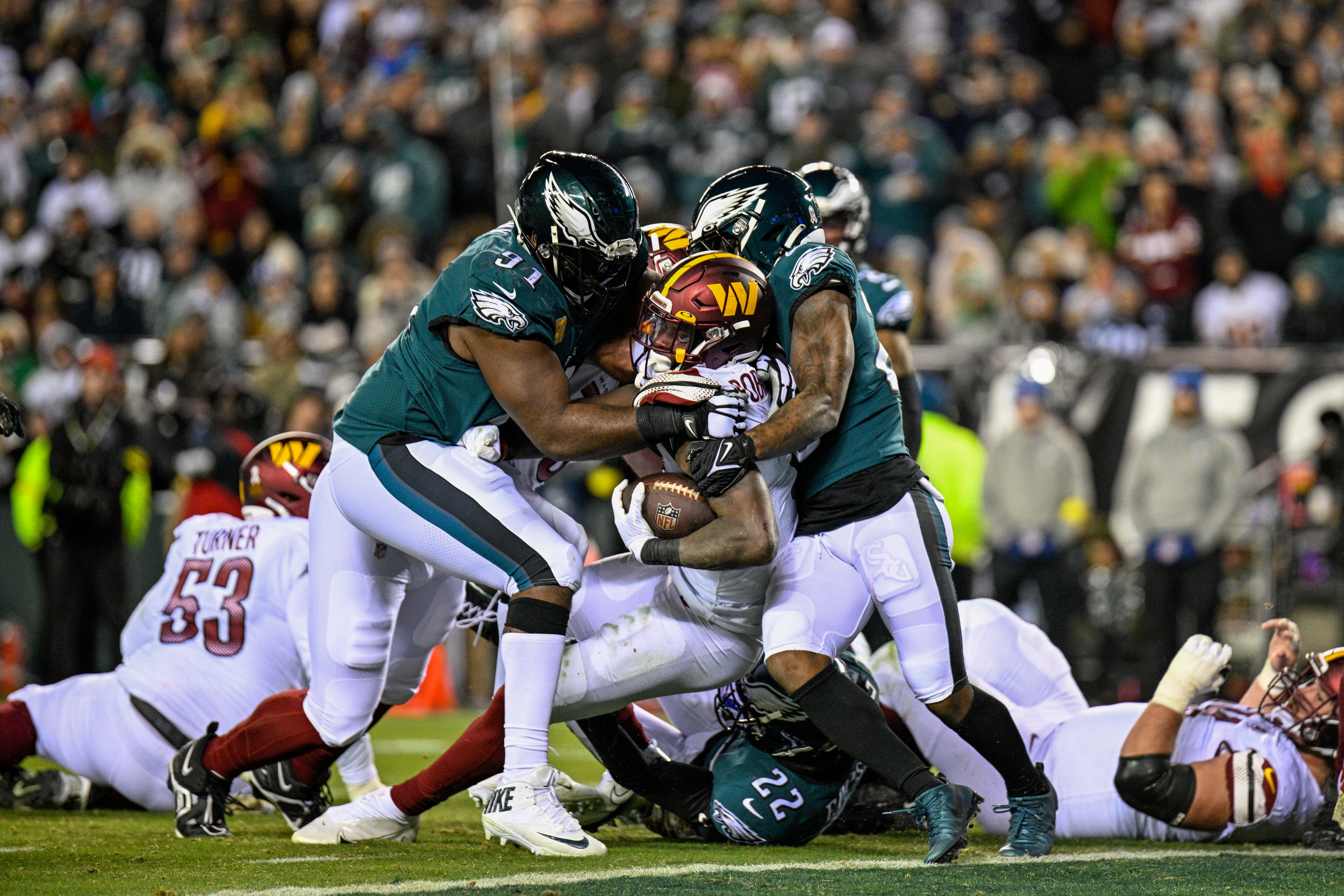
Washington vs. the Philadelphia Eagles

Week 10: Washington Commanders at Philadelphia Eagles – Game summary

Quarter	1	2	3	4	Total
**Commanders**	7	13	3	9	**32**
Eagles	14	0	0	7	**21**

at Lincoln Financial Field, Philadelphia, Pennsylvania

- Date: November 14
- Game time: 8:15 p.m. EST
- Game weather: Clear, 40 °F (4 °C)
- Game attendance: 69,879
- Referee: Alex Kemp
- TV announcers (WTTG/ESPN): Joe Buck, Troy Aikman and Lisa Salters
- Recap, Game Book

Game information

**First quarter**

- PHI – Jalen Hurts 1-yard run (Jake Elliott kick), 12:21. Eagles 7–0. **Drive: 3 plays, 18 yards, 0:51.**
- WAS – Antonio Gibson 1-yard run (Joey Slye kick), 5:00. Tied 7–7. **Drive: 13 plays, 75 yards, 7:21.**
- PHI – Dallas Goedert 6-yard pass from Jalen Hurts (Jake Elliott kick), 1:30. Eagles 14–7. **Drive: 9 plays, 78 yards, 3:30.**

**Second quarter**

- WAS – Joey Slye 44-yard field goal, 10:00. Eagles 14–10. **Drive: 12 plays, 49 yards, 6:30.**
- WAS – Brian Robinson Jr. 1-yard run (Joey Slye kick), 1:39. Commanders 17–14. **Drive: 16 plays, 86 yards, 7:04.**
- WAS – Joey Slye 58-yard field goal, 0:00. Commanders 20–14. **Drive: 8 plays, 30 yards, 1:06.**

**Third quarter**

- WAS – Joey Slye 32-yard field goal, 5:13. Commanders 23–14. **Drive: 14 plays, 66 yards, 8:23.**

**Fourth quarter**

- PHI – DeVonta Smith 11-yard pass from Jalen Hurts (Jake Elliott kick), 14:54. Commanders 23–21. **Drive: 12 plays, 80 yards, 5:19.**
- WAS – Joey Slye 55-yard field goal, 7:33. Commanders 26–21. **Drive: 4 plays, 2 yards, 1:36.**
- WAS – Casey Toohill 1-yard fumble return, 0:00. Commanders 32–21.

**Top passers**

- WAS – Taylor Heinicke – 17/29, 211 yards, INT
- PHI – Jalen Hurts – 17/26, 175 yards, 2 TD, INT

**Top rushers**

- WAS – Brian Robinson Jr. – 26 rushes, 86 yards, TD
- PHI – Miles Sanders – 12 rushes, 54 yards

**Top receivers**

- WAS – Terry McLaurin – 8 receptions, 128 yards
- PHI – Quez Watkins – 4 receptions, 80 yards

In a road divisional Monday Night Football matchup against the 8–0 Philadelphia Eagles, Washington had 40 minutes of time of possession to the Eagles 20, converted 12 of 21 third downs, and forced 4 turnovers to hand them their first loss of the season, avenging their Week 3 loss to Philadelphia and picking up their fourth win in five games. It marked the second time in three seasons that Washington defeated the last undefeated team; they also defeated the 11–0 Pittsburgh Steelers in 2020. With Washington leading 26–21 less than two minutes remaining in the game, Eagles defensive end Brandon Graham committed a personal foul on a late hit on quarterback Taylor Heinicke that allowed Washington to convert a third down and run the game clock down, before sealing the 32–21 upset victory with a fumble return touchdown by Casey Toohill on the game's final play. Running backs Antonio Gibson and Brian Robinson Jr. each scored a rushing touchdown, and Terry McLaurin contributed 128 receiving yards. Kicker Joey Slye also had a large impact, making four field goals including from 58 (a career-long) and 55 yards. This win also marked the first time since 2014 that Washington had split their season series with Philadelphia.

==== Week 11: at Houston Texans ====
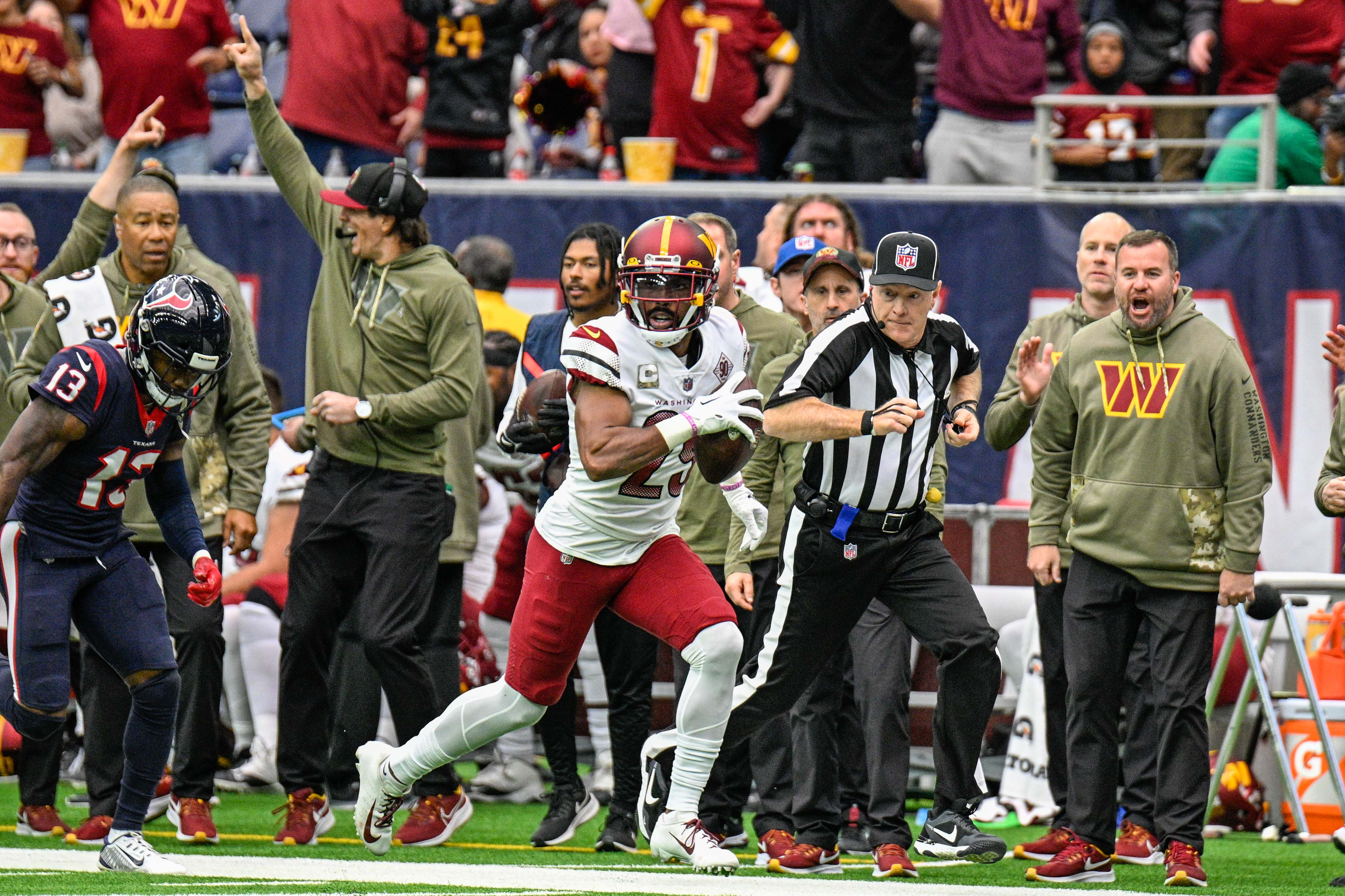
Washington vs. the Houston Texans

Week 11: Washington Commanders at Houston Texans – Game summary

Quarter	1	2	3	4	Total
**Commanders**	7	13	0	3	**23**
Texans	0	0	3	7	**10**

at NRG Stadium, Houston, Texas

- Date: November 20
- Game time: 1:00 p.m. EST/12:00 p.m. CST
- Game weather: None (retractable roof closed)
- Game attendance: 65,865
- Referee: Scott Novak
- TV announcers (Fox): Chris Myers, Robert Smith and Jen Hale
- Recap, Game Book

Game information

**First quarter**

- WSH – Kendall Fuller 37-yard interception return (Joey Slye kick), 13:16. Commanders 7–0.

**Second quarter**

- WSH – Curtis Samuel 10-yard run (Joey Slye kick), 11:44. Commanders 14–0. **Drive: 9 plays, 85 yards, 5:11.**
- WSH – Joey Slye 25-yard field goal, 4:53. Commanders 17–0. **Drive: 10 plays, 54 yards, 4:50.**
- WSH – Joey Slye 24-yard field goal, 0:07. Commanders 20–0. **Drive: 11 plays, 61 yards, 2:53.**

**Third quarter**

- HOU – Kaʻimi Fairbairn 29-yard field goal, 9:53. Commanders 20–3. **Drive: 11 plays, 64 yards, 5:07.**

**Fourth quarter**

- WSH – Joey Slye 44-yard field goal, 12:08. Commanders 23–3. **Drive: 10 plays, 20 yards, 6:31.**
- HOU – Davis Mills 4-yard run (Kaʻimi Fairbairn kick), 3:19. Commanders 23–10. **Drive: 11 plays, 55 yards, 4:20.**

**Top passers**

- WSH – Taylor Heinicke – 15/27, 191 yards
- HOU – Davis Mills – 19/33, 169 yards, 2 INT

**Top rushers**

- WSH – Antonio Gibson – 18 rushes, 72 yards
- HOU – Davis Mills – 5 rushes, 10 yards, TD

**Top receivers**

- WSH – Logan Thomas – 5 receptions, 65 yards
- HOU – Brandin Cooks – 3 receptions, 70 yards

Washington carried its momentum from their upset win over Philadelphia the prior week and dominated the struggling Houston Texans for their fifth win in their past six games. The Commanders dominated on defense in the first half, restricting the Houston offense to a total of 5 yards at halftime. Washington had a 20–0 half time thanks to a Kendall Fuller 37 yard pick 6 on the first Houston drive (the first of his career), a 10 yard Curtis Samuel run and two field goals. The second half was a turgid affair with Houston eventually getting on the board and ending up scoring with a Davis Mills 4 yard TD run.

==== Week 12: vs. Atlanta Falcons ====
Week 12: Atlanta Falcons at Washington Commanders – Game summary

Quarter	1	2	3	4	Total
Falcons	3	7	3	0	**13**
**Commanders**	7	3	6	3	**19**

at FedExField, Landover, Maryland

- Date: November 27
- Game time: 1:00 p.m. EST
- Game weather: Rain, 49 °F (9 °C)
- Game attendance: 53,864
- Referee: Brad Rogers
- TV announcers (Fox): Adam Amin, Mark Schlereth and Kristina Pink
- Recap, Game Book

Game information

**First quarter**

- ATL – Younghoe Koo 47-yard field goal, 8:07. Falcons 3–0. **Drive: 11 plays, 46 yards, 6:53.**
- WSH – Brian Robinson Jr. 14-yard pass from Taylor Heinicke (Joey Slye kick), 3:46. Commanders 7–3. **Drive: 7 plays, 74 yards, 4:21.**

**Second quarter**

- WSH – MyCole Pruitt 4-yard pass from Marcus Mariota (Younghoe Koo kick), 8:26. Falcons 10–7. **Drive: 11 plays, 77 yards, 6:28.**
- WSH – Joey Slye 30-yard field goal, 1:50. Tied 10–10. **Drive: 14 plays, 59 yards, 6:36.**

**Third quarter**

- WSH – John Bates 16-yard pass from Taylor Heinicke (kick failed), 4:03. Commanders 16–10. **Drive: 11 plays, 60 yards, 6:13.**
- ATL – Younghoe Koo 48-yard field goal, 1:17. Commanders 16–13. **Drive: 8 plays, 45 yards, 2:46.**

**Fourth quarter**

- WSH – Joey Slye 45-yard field goal, 9:05. Commanders 19–13. **Drive: 11 plays, 48 yards, 7:12.**

**Top passers**

- ATL – Marcus Mariota – 15/25, 174 yards, TD, INT
- WSH – Taylor Heinicke – 14/23, 138 yards, 2 TD, INT

**Top rushers**

- ATL – Tyler Allgeier – 11 rushes, 54 yards
- WSH – Brian Robinson Jr. – 18 rushes, 105 yards

**Top receivers**

- ATL – Olamide Zaccheaus – 5 receptions, 91 yards
- WSH – Terry McLaurin – 4 receptions, 48 yards

Despite giving up 167 rushing yards in the game, the Commanders held off the Falcons with a late interception for their sixth win in seven games. Brian Robinson Jr., who had his first 100-yard rushing game in his career, caught the first touchdown of the game to give Washington a 7–3 lead. Atlanta reclaimed the lead in the 2nd before Washington answered with a 30-yard field goal by Joey Slye to tie the game 10–10 before halftime. In the third, Taylor Heinicke threw his second touchdown of the game to John Bates to give Washington a 16–10 lead they would never relinquish. After both teams traded field goals to make it 19–13, Atlanta drove down to the Washington 4-yard line to try and win the game, but Mariota had his pass deflected at the line of scrimmage by Daron Payne before Kendall Fuller intercepted it in the endzone, sealing the victory for the Commanders.

==== Week 13: at New York Giants ====
Week 13: Washington Commanders at New York Giants – Game summary

Quarter	1	2	3	4	OT	Total
Commanders	10	3	0	7	0	**20**
Giants	0	13	7	0	0	**20**

at MetLife Stadium, East Rutherford, New Jersey

- Date: December 4
- Game time: 1:00 p.m. EST
- Game weather: Fair, 44 °F (7 °C)
- Game attendance: 76,128
- Referee: Brad Allen
- TV announcers (Fox): Kenny Albert, Jonathan Vilma and Shannon Spake
- Recap, Game Book

Game information

**First quarter**

- WAS – Joey Slye 21-yard field goal, 8:39. Commanders 3–0. **Drive: 10 plays, 45 yards, 4:27.**
- WAS – Terry McLaurin 19-yard pass from Taylor Heinicke (Joey Slye kick), 2:27. Commanders 10–0. **Drive: 8 plays, 62 yards, 4:04.**

**Second quarter**

- NYG – Graham Gano 48-yard field goal, 13:38. Commanders 10–3. **Drive: 8 plays, 45 yards, 3:49.**
- NYG – Saquon Barkley 13-yard run (Graham Gano kick), 8:49. Tied 10–10. **Drive: 5 plays, 81 yards, 2:38.**
- WAS – Joey Slye 42-yard field goal, 2:28. Commanders 13–10. **Drive: 12 plays, 51 yards, 6:21.**
- NYG – Graham Gano 27-yard field goal, 0:02. Tied 13–13. **Drive: 13 plays, 66 yards, 2:26.**

**Third quarter**

- NYG – Isaiah Hodgins 6-yard pass from Daniel Jones (Graham Gano kick), 11:34. Giants 20–13. **Drive: 5 plays, 20 yards, 2:37.**

**Fourth quarter**

- WAS – Jahan Dotson 28-yard pass from Taylor Heinicke (Joey Slye kick), 1:45. Tied 20–20. **Drive: 8 plays, 90 yards, 1:58.**

**Overtime**

- No scoring plays.

**Top passers**

- WAS – Taylor Heinicke – 27/41, 275 yards, 2 TD
- NYG – Daniel Jones – 25/31, 200 yards, TD

**Top rushers**

- WAS – Brian Robinson Jr. – 21 rushes, 96 yards
- NYG – Daniel Jones – 12 rushes, 71 yards

**Top receivers**

- WAS – Terry McLaurin – 8 receptions, 105 yards, TD
- NYG – Darius Slayton – 6 receptions, 90 yards

The Commanders tied for the first time since 2016, when the team was known as the Redskins. They dropped to 7–5–1.

==== Week 15: vs. New York Giants ====
Week 15: New York Giants at Washington Commanders – Game summary

Quarter	1	2	3	4	Total
**Giants**	0	14	3	3	**20**
Commanders	3	0	6	3	**12**

at FedExField, Landover, Maryland

- Date: December 18
- Game time: 8:20 p.m. EST
- Game weather: Cloudy, 34 °F (1 °C)
- Game attendance: 61,917
- Referee: John Hussey
- TV announcers (NBC): Mike Tirico, Cris Collinsworth and Melissa Stark
- Recap, Game Book

Game information

**First quarter**

- WAS – Joey Slye 41-yard field goal, 2:51. Commanders 3–0. **Drive: 9 plays, 47 yards, 4:52.**

**Second quarter**

- NYG – Kayvon Thibodeaux 1-yard fumble return (Graham Gano kick), 13:10. Giants 7–3.
- NYG – Saquon Barkley 3-yard run (Graham Gano kick), 1:43. Giants 14–3. **Drive: 18 plays, 97 yards, 8:35.**

**Third quarter**

- WAS – Jahan Dotson 19-yard pass from Taylor Heinicke (kick failed), 8:38. Giants 14–9. **Drive: 6 plays, 91 yards, 4:11.**
- NYG – Graham Gano 50-yard field goal, 3:11. Giants 17–9. **Drive: 10 plays, 43 yards, 5:27.**

**Fourth quarter**

- WAS – Joey Slye 51-yard field goal, 12:31. Giants 17–12. **Drive: 7 plays, 25 yards, 2:51.**
- NYG – Graham Gano 50-yard field goal, 1:55. Giants 20–12. **Drive: 9 plays, 54 yards, 4:11.**

**Top passers**

- NYG – Daniel Jones – 21/32, 160 yards
- WAS – Taylor Heinicke – 17/29, 249 yards, TD

**Top rushers**

- NYG – Saquon Barkley – 18 rushes, 87 yards, TD
- WAS – Brian Robinson Jr. – 12 rushes, 89 yards

**Top receivers**

- NYG – Richie James – 4 receptions, 42 yards
- WAS – Jahan Dotson – 4 receptions, 105 yards, TD

==== Week 16: at San Francisco 49ers ====
Week 16: Washington Commanders at San Francisco 49ers – Game summary

Quarter	1	2	3	4	Total
Commanders	0	7	7	6	**20**
**49ers**	0	7	14	16	**37**

at Levi's Stadium, Santa Clara, California

- Date: December 24
- Game time: 4:05 p.m. EST/1:05 p.m. PST
- Game weather: Hazy, 62 °F (17 °C)
- Game attendance: 71,642
- Referee: Jerome Boger
- TV announcers (CBS): Kevin Harlan, Trent Green, and Melanie Collins
- Recap, Game Book

Game information

**First quarter**

- No scoring plays.

**Second quarter**

- SF – Ray-Ray McCloud 71-yard run (Robbie Gould kick), 6:26. 49ers 7–0. **Drive: 7 plays, 99 yards, 3:06.**
- WAS – Jahan Dotson 7-yard pass from Taylor Heinicke (Joey Slye kick), 0:22. Tied 7–7. **Drive: 8 plays, 31 yards, 2:35.**

**Third quarter**

- SF – George Kittle 34-yard pass from Brock Purdy (Robbie Gould kick), 10:38. 49ers 14–7. **Drive: 7 plays, 76 yards, 4:42.**
- SF – George Kittle 33-yard pass from Brock Purdy (Robbie Gould kick), 4:52. 49ers 21–7. **Drive: 2 plays, 34 yards, 0:51.**
- WAS – Terry McLaurin 3-yard pass from Taylor Heinicke (Joey Slye kick), 2:46. 49ers 21–14. **Drive: 4 plays, 75 yards, 2:06.**

Fourth quarter'

- SF – Robbie Gould 26-yard field goal, 14:56. 49ers 24–14. **Drive: 5 plays, 52 yards, 2:50.**
- SF – Robbie Gould 23-yard field goal, 12:02. 49ers 27–14. **Drive: 4 plays, 6 yards, 2:02.**
- SF – Robbie Gould 35-yard field goal, 9:17. 49ers 30–14. **Drive: 4 plays, 8 yards, 1:54.**
- WAS – Curtis Samuel 20-yard pass from Carson Wentz (pass failed), 5:25. 49ers 30–20. **Drive: 11 plays, 82 yards, 3:51.**
- SF – Christian McCaffrey 1-yard run (Robbie Gould kick), 2:13. 49ers 37–20. **Drive: 8 plays, 33 yards, 3:12.**

**Top passers**

- WAS – Taylor Heinicke – 13/18, 166 yards, 2 TD, INT
- SF – Brock Purdy – 15/22, 234 yards, 2 TD, INT

**Top rushers**

- WAS – Brian Robinson Jr. – 22 rushes, 58 yards
- SF – Ray-Ray McCloud – 1 rush, 71 yards, TD

**Top receivers**

- WAS – Terry McLaurin – 4 receptions, 77 yards, TD
- SF – George Kittle – 6 receptions, 120 yards, 2 TD

==== Week 17: vs. Cleveland Browns ====
Week 17: Cleveland Browns at Washington Commanders – Game summary

Quarter	1	2	3	4	Total
**Browns**	3	0	14	7	**24**
Commanders	0	7	0	3	**10**

at FedExField, Landover, Maryland

- Date: January 1
- Game time: 1:00 p.m. EST
- Game weather: Sunny, 62 °F (17 °C)
- Game attendance: 50,827
- Referee: Bill Vinovich
- TV announcers (Fox): Adam Amin, Mark Schlereth and Kristina Pink
- Recap, Game Book

Game information

**First quarter**

- CLE – Cade York 37-yard field goal, 9:22. Browns 3–0. **Drive: 5 plays, 17 yards, 1:26.**

**Second quarter**

- WAS – Carson Wentz 1-yard run (Joey Slye kick), 0:21. Commanders 7–3. **Drive: 21 plays, 96 yards, 11:27.**

**Third quarter**

- CLE – Amari Cooper 46-yard pass from Deshaun Watson (Cade York kick), 10:03. Browns 10–7. **Drive: 6 plays, 63 yards, 2:50.**
- CLE – Donovan Peoples-Jones 13-yard pass from Deshaun Watson (Cade York kick), 0:36. Browns 17–7. **Drive: 12 plays, 84 yards, 6:20.**

**Fourth quarter**

- WAS – Joey Slye 43-yard field goal, 10:26. Browns 17–10. **Drive: 9 plays, 50 yards, 5:10.**
- CLE – Amari Cooper 33-yard pass from Deshaun Watson (Cade York kick), 5:21. Browns 24–10. **Drive: 9 plays, 75 yards, 5:05.**

**Top passers**

- CLE – Deshaun Watson – 9/18, 169 yards, 3 TD
- WAS – Carson Wentz – 16/28, 143 yards, 3 INT

**Top rushers**

- CLE – Nick Chubb – 14 rushes, 104 yards
- WAS – Brian Robinson Jr. – 24 rushes, 87 yards

**Top receivers**

- CLE – Amari Cooper – 3 receptions, 105 yards, 2 TD
- WAS – Logan Thomas – 6 receptions, 56 yards

Carson Wentz returned to the starting position this week but would end up losing to the Browns, which eliminated them from playoff contention for a second consecutive season.

In a post-game interview following the game, Rivera, who was already criticized for benching Heinicke for Wentz, received further criticism for being unaware that a Packers win over the Vikings would end up eliminating the Commanders from playoff contention.

==== Week 18: vs. Dallas Cowboys ====
Week 18: Dallas Cowboys at Washington Commanders – Game summary

Quarter	1	2	3	4	Total
Cowboys	0	6	0	0	**6**
**Commanders**	7	6	7	6	**26**

at FedExField, Landover, Maryland

- Date: January 8
- Game time: 4:25 p.m. EST
- Game weather: Cloudy, 42 °F (6 °C)
- Game attendance: 62,814
- Referee: Tra Blake
- TV announcers (Fox): Kevin Burkhardt, Greg Olsen, Erin Andrews and Tom Rinaldi
- Recap, Game Book

Game information

**First quarter**

- WAS – Terry McLaurin 16-yard pass from Sam Howell (Joey Slye kick), 11:08. Commanders 7–0. **Drive: 2 plays, 20 yards, 0:37.**

**Second quarter**

- WAS – Kendall Fuller 29-yard interception return (kick failed), 12:38. Commanders 13–0.
- DAL – CeeDee Lamb 15-yard pass from Dak Prescott (kick failed), 0:06. Commanders 13–6. **Drive: 14 plays, 77 yards, 2:31.**

**Third quarter**

- WAS – Sam Howell 9-yard run (Joey Slye kick), 1:49. Commanders 20–6. **Drive: 6 plays, 59 yards, 3:45.**

**Fourth quarter**

- WAS – Joey Slye 29-yard field goal, 14:19. Commanders 23–6. **Drive: 5 plays, 56 yards, 1:25.**
- WAS – Joey Slye 22-yard field goal, 5:19. Commanders 26–6. **Drive: 6 plays, 41 yards, 3:30.**

**Top passers**

- DAL – Dak Prescott – 14/37, 128 yards, TD, INT
- WAS – Sam Howell – 11/19, 169 yards, TD, INT

**Top rushers**

- DAL – Tony Pollard – 7 rushes, 19 yards
- WAS – Jaret Patterson – 17 rushes, 78 yards

**Top receivers**

- DAL – CeeDee Lamb – 5 receptions, 52 yards, TD
- WAS – Terry McLaurin – 3 receptions, 74 yards, TD

Washington ended their inaugural season as the Commanders on a positive note in a rout of the rival Dallas Cowboys. Rookie quarterback Sam Howell made his NFL debut and went 11 of 19 passing for 169 yards, a touchdown and an interception, as well as registering 35 yards on five carries with a touchdown. This game featured the No. 9 jersey number retirement of legendary Redskins quarterback Sonny Jurgensen. In addition to quarterbacking for Washington, Jurgensen was a part of the famous trio of Jurgensen, Sam Huff, and Frank Herzog, all of whom helmed the radio broadcast for the franchise together from 1981 to 2004. This was the Commanders' final game under Daniel Snyder's ownership, as Snyder sold the organization in 2023, to a group led by Josh Harris.

=== Standings ===
==== Division ====
NFC East
	W	L	T	PCT	DIV	CONF	PF	PA	STK
^{(1)} Philadelphia Eagles	14	3	0	.824	4–2	9–3	477	344	W1
^{(5)} Dallas Cowboys	12	5	0	.706	4–2	8–4	467	342	L1
^{(6)} New York Giants	9	7	1	.559	1–4–1	4–7–1	365	371	L1
Washington Commanders	8	8	1	.500	2–3–1	5–6–1	321	343	W1

==== Conference ====
NFC
#	Team	Division	W	L	T	PCT	DIV	CONF	SOS	SOV	STK
**Division leaders**
1	Philadelphia Eagles	East	14	3	0	.824	4–2	9–3	.474	.460	W1
2 (Note: San Francisco claimed the No. 2 seed over Minnesota based on conference record (10–2 vs. 8–4).)	San Francisco 49ers	West	13	4	0	.765	6–0	10–2	.417	.414	W10
3	Minnesota Vikings	North	13	4	0	.765	4–2	8–4	.474	.425	W1
4	Tampa Bay Buccaneers	South	8	9	0	.471	4–2	8–4	.503	.426	L1
**Wild cards**
5	Dallas Cowboys	East	12	5	0	.706	4–2	8–4	.507	.485	L1
6	New York Giants	East	9	7	1	.559	1–4–1	4–7–1	.526	.395	L1
7 (Note: Seattle finished ahead of Detroit based on head-to-head victory, claiming the 7th and final playoff spot.)	Seattle Seahawks	West	9	8	0	.529	4–2	6–6	.462	.382	W2
**Did not qualify for the postseason**
8	Detroit Lions	North	9	8	0	.529	5–1	7–5	.535	.451	W2
9	Washington Commanders	East	8	8	1	.500	2–3–1	5–6–1	.536	.449	W1
10	Green Bay Packers	North	8	9	0	.471	3–3	6–6	.524	.449	L1
11 (Note: Carolina finished ahead of New Orleans and Atlanta based on head-to-head record (3–1 vs. 2–2/1–3).)	Carolina Panthers	South	7	10	0	.412	4–2	6–6	.474	.437	W1
12 (Note: New Orleans finished ahead of Atlanta based on head-to-head sweep.)	New Orleans Saints	South	7	10	0	.412	2–4	5–7	.507	.462	L1
13	Atlanta Falcons	South	7	10	0	.412	2–4	6–6	.467	.429	W2
14	Los Angeles Rams	West	5	12	0	.294	1–5	3–9	.517	.341	L2
15	Arizona Cardinals	West	4	13	0	.235	1–5	3–9	.529	.368	L7
16	Chicago Bears	North	3	14	0	.176	0–6	1–11	.571	.480	L10
**Tiebreakers** (Note: When breaking ties for three or more teams under the NFL's rules, they are first broken within divisions, then comparing only the highest-ranked remaining team from each division.)
