= Brian Robinson Jr. =

American football player (born 1999)

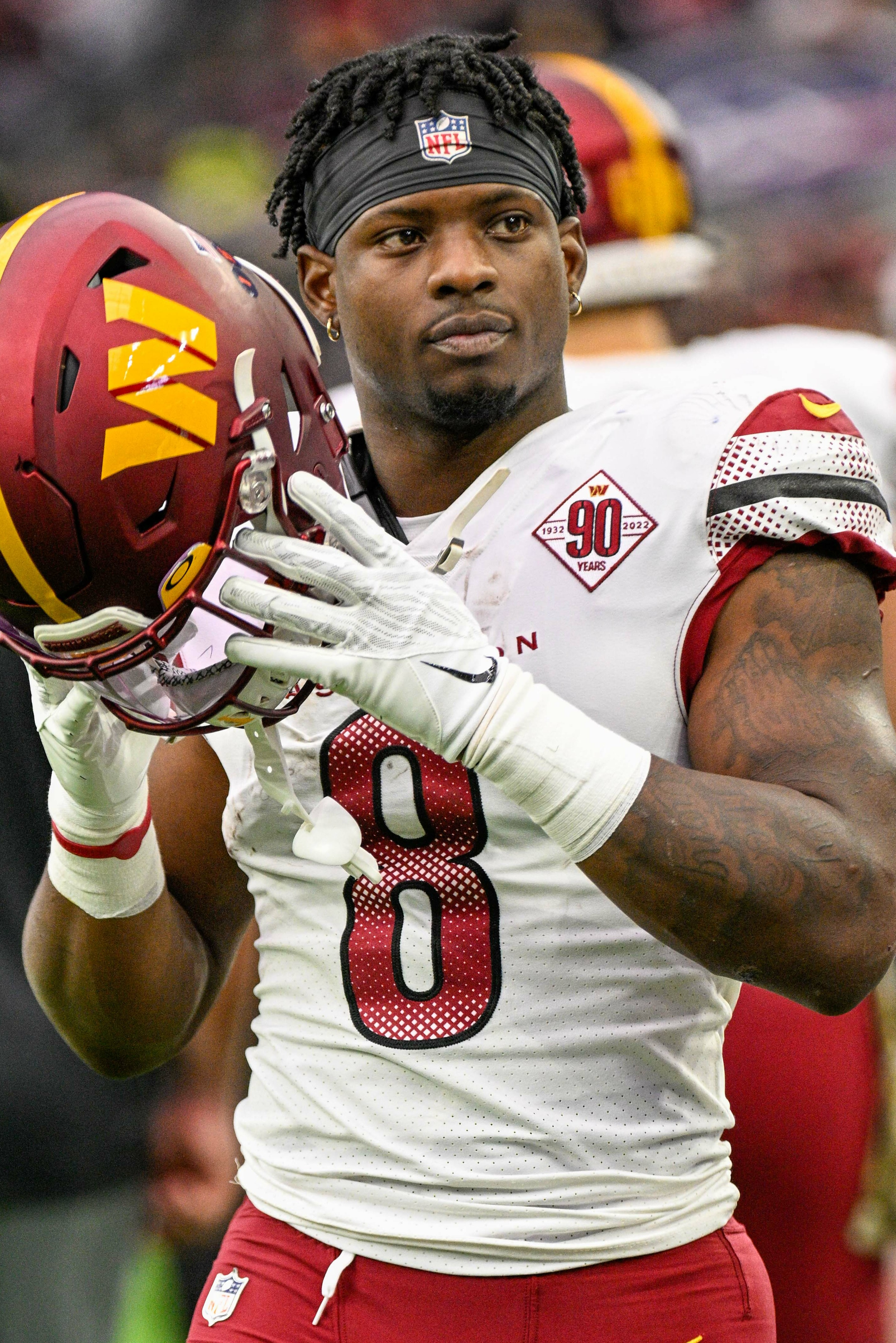
- Robinson with the Washington Commanders in 2022

No. 15 – Atlanta Falcons
- Positions: Running back, punt returner
- Roster status: Injured reserve

Personal information
- Born: March 22, 1999 (age 27); Tuscaloosa, Alabama, U.S.
- Listed height: 6 ft 1 in (1.85 m)
- Listed weight: 225 lb (102 kg)

Career information
- High school: Hillcrest (Tuscaloosa)
- College: Alabama (2017–2021)
- NFL draft: 2022: 3rd round, 98th overall pick

Career history
- Washington Commanders (2022–2024); San Francisco 49ers (2025); Atlanta Falcons (2026–present)

Awards and highlights
- 2× CFP national champion (2017, 2020); First-team All-SEC (2021)

Career NFL statistics as of Week 5, 2026
- Rushing yards: 2,939
- Rushing average: 4.1
- Rushing touchdowns: 21
- Receptions: 76
- Receiving yards: 633
- Receiving touchdowns: 5
- Return yards: 557
- Stats at Pro Football Reference

Brian Kabir Robinson Jr. (born March 22, 1999), nicknamed "B Rob", is an American professional football running back and punt returner for the Atlanta Falcons of the National Football League (NFL). He played college football for the Alabama Crimson Tide, where he was a two-time national champion. Robinson was selected by the Washington Commanders in the third round of the 2022 NFL draft. Prior to his rookie season, he was shot twice during an armed robbery and returned to the team two months later.

== Early life ==
Robinson Jr. was born on March 22, 1999, in Tuscaloosa, Alabama. He attended Hillcrest High School, where he rushed for 990 yards and 18 touchdowns as a senior and was named second team Class 6A All-State. Robinson was rated a four-star running back recruit and committed to play college football at the University of Alabama over offers from Auburn, Georgia, Louisville, Ole Miss, and South Carolina, among others.

== College career ==
In his collegiate debut against Vanderbilt, Robinson scored his first collegiate rushing touchdown in the 59–0 victory. As a freshman, Robinson rushed for 165 yards and two touchdowns as a reserve player behind Najee Harris and Josh Jacobs as Alabama went on to win the 2018 CFP National Championship Game.

In the 2018 season, Robinson carved out a role as Alabama's fourth running back. Robinson gained 272 yards and two touchdowns on 63 carries in his sophomore season. In the 2019 season, Robinson became Alabama's second running back, only behind Najee Harris. As a junior, Robinson rushed 96 times for 441 yards and five rushing touchdowns while catching 11 passes for 124 receiving yards. In the 2020 season, Robinson continued to be the second running back to Harris. Alabama won their second national title during his time there. He totaled 91 carries for 483 rushing yards and six rushing touchdowns.

Following Harris leaving for the NFL draft, Robinson became Alabama's featured back as a fifth-year senior in 2021. Though hampered by injuries, Robinson roughly equaled his output of the previous four years, leading the Southeastern Conference in carries and touchdowns. On October 2, against Ole Miss, he had 36 carries for 171 rushing yards and four rushing touchdowns in the 42–21 victory. He was named the most valuable player of the 2021 Cotton Bowl Classic after rushing for 204 yards, a school record for a bowl game. He finished the 2021 season with 271 carries for 1,343 rushing yards, and 14 rushing touchdowns to go along with 35 receptions for 296 receiving yards and two receiving touchdowns.

== Professional career ==
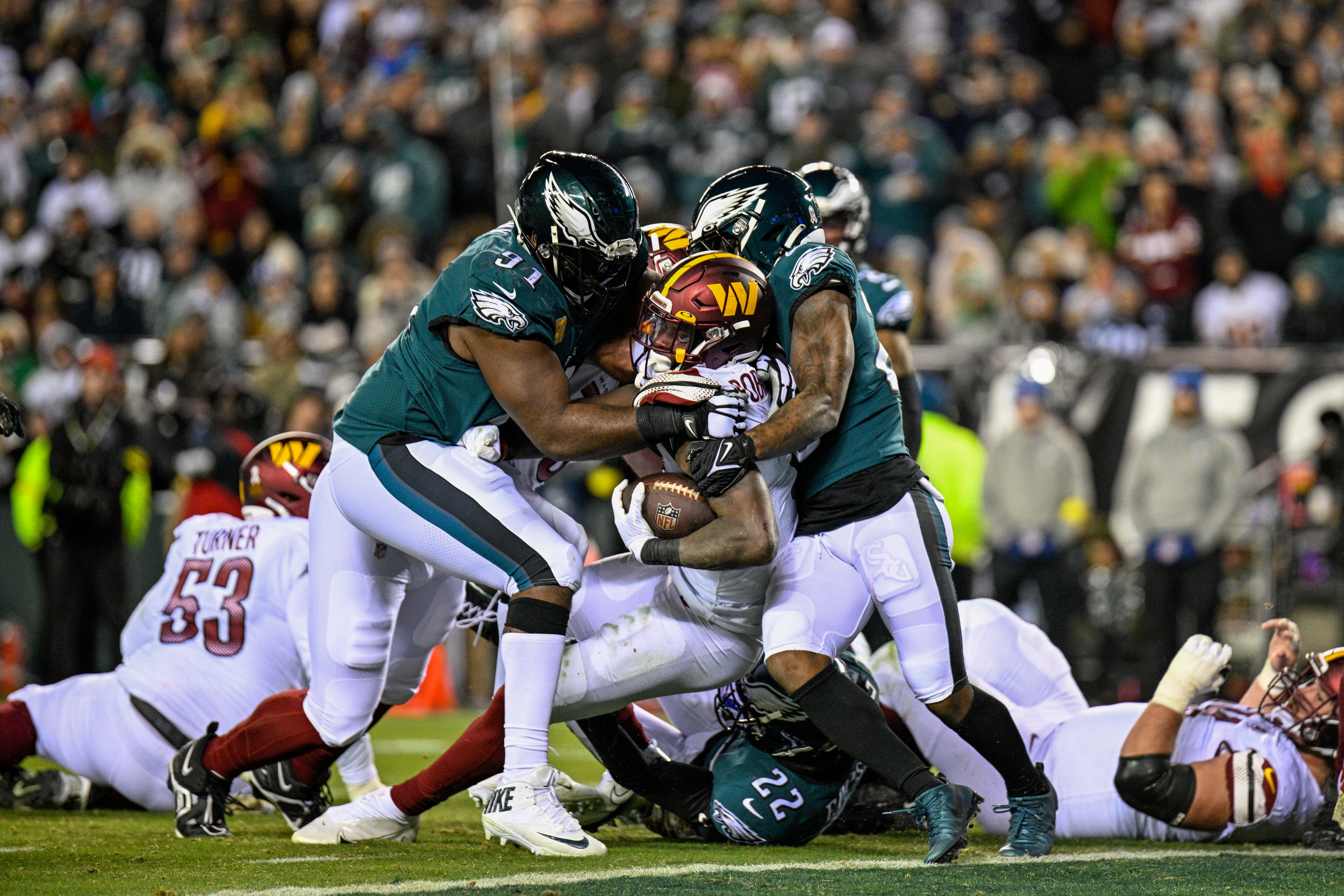
Robinson scoring a touchdown against the Philadelphia Eagles, 2022

Pre-draft measurables
Height	Weight	Arm length	Hand span	Wingspan	40-yard dash	10-yard split	20-yard split	20-yard shuttle	Three-cone drill	Vertical jump	Broad jump
6 ft 1 5/8 in (1.87 m)	225 lb (102 kg)	31 7/8 in (0.81 m)	9 3/4 in (0.25 m)	6 ft 4 3/8 in (1.94 m)	4.53 s	1.59 s	2.63 s	4.59 s	7.33 s	30.0 in (0.76 m)	9 ft 11 in (3.02 m)
All values from NFL Combine/Pro Day

=== Washington Commanders ===
Robinson was selected by the Washington Commanders in the third round (98th overall) of the 2022 NFL draft. He signed his four-year rookie contract on May 18, 2022. On August 28, 2022, Robinson was shot in the knee and glute during an armed robbery involving two men after leaving a restaurant in the Near Northeast neighborhood of Washington, D.C. shortly before 6 p.m. EDT. He suffered no life-threatening damage and was discharged from MedStar Washington Hospital Center the following day. Robinson missed the first four games of the season before making his NFL debut in Week 5 against the Tennessee Titans, where he rushed nine times for 22 yards.

Robinson's first career touchdown came the following week against the Chicago Bears, a game-winner in the fourth quarter of a Commanders victory. He recorded his first career 100-yard rushing game in a Week 12 win over the Atlanta Falcons. As a rookie, he appeared in 12 games and started nine. He finished with 205 carries for 797 rushing yards and two rushing touchdowns to go along with nine receptions for 60 receiving yards and one receiving touchdown. He was named the 2022 Inspiration of the Year by Sports Illustrated and voted Washington's Ed Block Courage Award winner.

In Week 10 of the 2023 season, Robinson had six receptions for 119 yards and a touchdown in the 29–26 loss to the Seattle Seahawks. He started 15 games during the season, finishing with 178 carries for 733 rushing yards and five rushing touchdowns with 36 receptions for 368 receiving yards and four receiving touchdowns.

In Week 2 of the 2024 season, Robinson had 17 carries for a new game-high of 133 rushing yards. He would record 101 rushing yards and a touchdown in the Week 4 win over the Arizona Cardinals. In Week 13, he had his third 100+ yard performance with 103 rushing yards and a touchdown in the 42-19 win against the Tennessee Titans. He finished the 2024 regular season with new career highs of 799 rushing yards and eight rushing touchdowns over 14 games. Robinson recorded 77 rushing yards and two rushing touchdowns in the 45-31 Divisional round win over the Detroit Lions that advanced Washington to the NFC Championship Game. In the NFC Championship Game, Robinson had 11 carries for 36 yards in the 55–23 loss against the eventual Super Bowl champion Philadelphia Eagles.

=== San Francisco 49ers ===
On August 24, 2025, Robinson was traded to the San Francisco 49ers in exchange for a sixth-round pick in the 2026 NFL draft. He played in all 17 games as the backup to Christian McCaffrey, recording 400 rushing yards and two touchdowns.

=== Atlanta Falcons ===
On March 26, 2026, Robinson signed a one-year, $2.5 million contract with the Atlanta Falcons.

== Career statistics ==
=== NFL ===
Legend
**Bold**	Career high

==== Regular season ====
Year	Team	Games		Rushing					Receiving					Kick returns					Fumbles	
Year	Team	GP	GS	Att	Yds	Y/A	Lng	TD	Rec	Yds	Avg	Lng	TD	Ret	Yds	Avg	Lng	TD	Fum	Lost
2022	WAS	12	9	**205**	797	3.9	24	2	9	60	6.7	18	1	–	–	–	–	–	2	0
2023	WAS	**15**	**15**	178	733	4.1	29	5	**36**	**368**	**10.2**	**51**	**4**	–	–	–	–	–	**4**	**2**
2024	WAS	14	13	187	**799**	4.3	**40**	**8**	20	159	8.0	32	0	–	–	–	–	–	2	**2**
2025	SF	17	0	92	400	4.3	19	2	8	25	3.1	6	0	13	378	29.1	46	0	0	0
2026	ATL	5	0	51	210	4.1	16	4	3	21	7.0	12	0	6	179	29.8	40	0	0	0
Career		63	37	713	2,939	4.1	40	21	76	633	8.3	51	5	19	557	29.3	46	0	8	4

==== Postseason ====
Year	Team	Games		Rushing					Receiving					Kick returns					Fumbles	
Year	Team	GP	GS	Att	Yds	Avg	Lng	TD	Rec	Yds	Avg	Lng	TD	Ret	Yds	Avg	Lng	TD	Fum	Lost
2024	WAS	**3**	**3**	**36**	**129**	**3.6**	**15**	**2**	**4**	**22**	**5.5**	**13**	0	–	–	–	–	–	0	0
2025	SF	2	0	3	4	1.3	2	0	1	3	3.0	3	0	6	130	21.7	26	0	0	0
Career		5	3	39	133	3.4	15	2	5	25	5.0	13	0	6	130	21.7	26	0	0	0

=== College ===
Season	GP	Rushing				Receiving			
Season	GP	Att	Yds	Avg	TD	Rec	Yds	Avg	TD
2017	6	24	165	6.9	2	0	0	0	0
2018	9	63	272	4.3	2	0	0	0	0
2019	13	96	441	4.6	5	11	124	11.3	0
2020	13	91	483	5.3	6	6	26	4.3	0
2021	14	271	1,343	5	14	35	296	8.5	2
Career	55	545	2,704	5	29	52	446	8.6	2

== Personal life ==
Robinson is colloquially known as "B Rob".
