= Prier =

Prier is a surname. Notable people with it include:

- Bob Prier (born 1976), Canadian ice hockey coach and former player
- Peter Prier (1942–2015), German-American violin maker

== See also ==
- Pryor
- Pryer
- Pry (disambiguation)
- Prior (disambiguation)
