= Charles Pryor =

Charles Pryor may refer to:

- Charles Pryor (cricketer) (1815–1897), English cricketer
- Charles Pryor (politician) (1959–2024), American politician
- Charles Pryor, the husband of American author Suzanne Collins
