= Pryer =

Pryer is a surname. Notable people with the name Pryer include:

- Barry Pryer (1925–2007), British cricketer
- Charlene Pryer (1921–1999), American baseball player
- William Burgess Pryer, (1843–1899) British businessman and founder of Sandakan, British North Borneo

== See also ==
- Pryor
- Prier
- Prior (disambiguation)
