= Pryor =

Pryor is a surname, which can refer to:

- Aaron Pryor (1955–2016), American boxer
- Alexander Pryor, Canadian Anglican bishop
- Alfred Reginald Pryor (1839–1881), English botanist
- Anduele Pryor (born 1985), Dutch football player
- Arthur Pryor (1870–1942), American trombonist and bandleader
- Cactus Pryor (1923–2011), Texan humorist and broadcaster
- Charles Pryor (cricketer) (1815–1897), English cricketer
- Charles Pryor (politician) (1959–2024), American politician
- David Pryor (1934–2024), American politician, U.S. Senator from Arkansas, father of Mark Pryor
- David Pryor (cricketer) (1870–1937), Australian cricketer
- DJ Pryor, American stand-up comedian and actor
- Elizabeth Stordeur Pryor (born 1967), American academic
- Evan Pryor (born 2002), American football player
- Francis Pryor (born 1945), British archaeologist
- Francis R. Pryor (1862–1937), English playwright
- Frederic Pryor (1933–2019), American economist, arrested in East Germany in 1961
- Greg Pryor (born 1949), American baseball player
- James Pryor (born 1968), American philosopher
- Joshua Pryor (born 1999), American football player
- Karen Pryor (1932–2025), American behavioral psychologist and author
- Kendric Pryor (born 1998), American football player
- Karen Chandler Pryor (born 1957), American advocator
- Lindsay Pryor (1915–1998), Australian botanist
- Louise Pryor, British actuary
- Mark Pryor (born 1963), American politician
- Matt Pryor (American football) (born 1994), American football player
- Michael Pryor (born 1957), Australian author
- Nicholas Pryor (1935–2024), American actor
- Quentin Pryor (born 1983), American basketball player
- Rain Pryor (born 1968), American actress
- Richard Pryor (1940–2005), American comedian, actor, and writer
- Roger Atkinson Pryor (1828–1919), Virginia secessionist and New York state judge
- Ronald Pryor (1901–1977), Brazilian cricketer
- Snooky Pryor (1921–2006), Afro-American blues musician
- Terrelle Pryor (born 1989), American football player

It may also refer to the following places:

- Pryor Creek, Oklahoma, a city commonly called Pryor
- Pryor, Colorado
- Pryor, Montana

== See also ==
- Preyer
- Prior (surname)
