= Pries =

Pries is a surname. Notable people with the name Pries include:

- Axel Radlach Pries, German physiologist
- Ken Pries, American sports broadcaster
- Lionel Pries (1897–1968), American architect and artist
- Nadja Pries (born 1994), German BMX rider
- Rachel Justine Pries, American mathematician

== See also ==
- Preis, a surname
- Pry (disambiguation)
