= Pry =

Pry may refer to:

- Pry (software), an interactive shell for the Ruby programming language
- Polly Pry (1857–1938), reporter for the Denver Post
- Paul Pry (play), an 1825 farce in three acts
- Pry bar, a crowbar
- Pry, A traditional English name for the small leaved lime tree Tilia cordata.
- Pry (novel), an interactive digital novella by Samantha Gorman

== See also ==
- Sean O'Pry (born 1989), American male model
- PRY (disambiguation)
- Pries
- Prier
