= 2023 Washington Commanders season =

92nd season in franchise history, first under ownership of Josh Harris

- Owner: Josh Harris
- General manager: Martin Mayhew
- President: Jason Wright
- Head coach: Ron Rivera
- Offensive coordinator: Eric Bieniemy
- Defensive coordinator: Jack Del Rio (fired); Ron Rivera (interim)
- Home stadium: FedExField

Results
- Record: 4–13
- Division place: 4th NFC East
- Playoffs: Did not qualify
- Pro Bowlers: None

Uniform
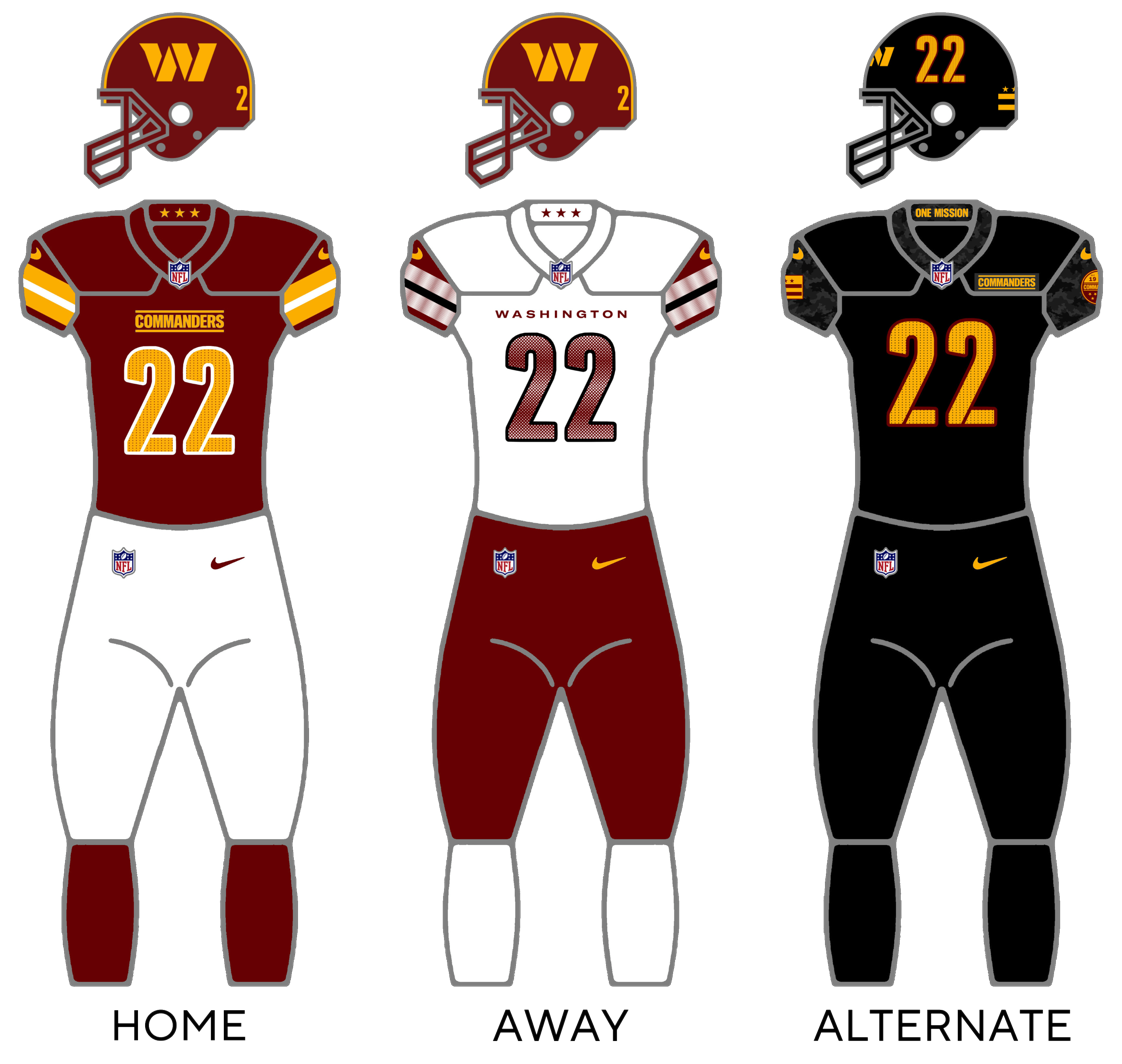

The 2023 season was the Washington Commanders' 92nd season in the National Football League (NFL) and their fourth and final under head coach Ron Rivera. It was the first season under owner Josh Harris, who headed a group in the offseason that bought the franchise from Daniel Snyder for $6.05 billion.

The team replaced offensive coordinator Scott Turner, who joined the team in 2020, with former Kansas City Chiefs offensive coordinator Eric Bieniemy, who was also named assistant head coach. Defensive coordinator Jack Del Rio and defensive backs coach Brent Vieselmeyer were fired following a 45–10 loss to the Dallas Cowboys on Thanksgiving.

Despite a 2–0 start for the first time since 2011, the Commanders finished 4–13, failing to improve upon their 2022 record of 8–8–1. The team allowed the most points in the league (518) and had the worst point differential (−189). They also allowed 30 points per game on average, their worst since they allowed 36 in the 1954 season. It was the Commanders' seventh straight non-winning season and third straight missing the playoffs, with the team also going winless in the division for the first time since 2019 and for the third time since 2009. Rivera and his staff were fired following the season's end. This also marked the first season since 1993 where none of the team's players were selected for the Pro Bowl. This was the Commanders' seventh consecutive season with a new quarterback starting on opening week, as Carson Wentz left to go to the Los Angeles Rams. Quarterback Sam Howell became the first quarterback to throw 21 or more interceptions in a season since Baker Mayfield and Jameis Winston threw 21 and 30 interceptions in 2019, respectively.

== Ownership change ==
Daniel Snyder, whose ownership had been mired in controversy amid a lack of on-field success since buying the franchise in 1999, sold the team to a group headed by Josh Harris, co-founder of Apollo Global Management and owner of the NBA's Philadelphia 76ers and NHL's New Jersey Devils, for $6.05 billion. The group has 20 limited partners worth a combined $100 billion, the most in the NFL, which includes Danaher and Glenstone founder Mitchell Rales, Hall of Fame basketball player Magic Johnson, 76ers and Devils co-owner David Blitzer, D.C. entrepreneur Mark Ein, Maverick Capital founder Lee Ainslie, former Magic Johnson Enterprises president Eric Holoman, Blue Owl Capital founders Marc Lipschultz and Doug Ostrover, the Santo Domingo family, ProShares founder Michael Sapir, former Google CEO Eric Schmidt, and Cambridge Information Group CEO Andy Snyder. The deal was the highest price ever paid for a sports team at the time and was unanimously approved by the NFL on July 20, 2023.

== Draft ==
2023 Washington Commanders draft selections
Round	Pick	Player	Position	College	Notes
1	16	Emmanuel Forbes	CB	Mississippi State	
2	47	Quan Martin	CB	Illinois	
3	79	Traded to the Indianapolis Colts (Note: The Commanders traded a conditional third-round selection (that would have become a second if Wentz played on 70% of the Commanders' 2022 offensive snaps), and 2022 second- and third-round selections to the Indianapolis Colts in exchange for 2022 second- and seventh-round selections, and QB Carson Wentz.)			
3	97	Ricky Stromberg	C	Arkansas	
4	118	Braeden Daniels	OT	Utah	
5	137	KJ Henry	DE	Clemson	From Cardinals via Bills (Note: The Commanders traded fifth- and sixth-round selections (150th and 215th overall) to the Buffalo Bills in exchange for a fifth-round selection (137th overall).)
5	150	Traded to the Buffalo Bills			
6	193	Chris Rodriguez Jr.	RB	Kentucky	
6	215	Traded to the Buffalo Bills			
7	233	Andre Jones Jr.	DE	Louisiana	

2023 Washington Commanders undrafted free agents
Player	Position	College
Kazmeir Allen	WR	UCLA
Zion Bowens	WR	Hawaii
Mason Brooks	OL	Ole Miss
Tim DeMorat	QB	Fordham
Xavier Henderson	S	Michigan State
Joshua Pryor	DE	Bowie State
Jalen Sample	WR	Minnesota State
Kendall Smith	S	Illinois
DJ Stirgus	CB	Missouri Western
Mitchell Tinsley	WR	Penn State
Brycen Tremayne	WR	Stanford
Nick Whiteside	CB	Saginaw Valley State

Draft trades

== Staff ==
2023 Washington Commanders staff
Front office: Managing partner – Josh Harris; Limited partners – Mitchell Rales, Magic Johnson, Mark Ein; President – Jason Wright; General manager – Martin Mayhew; Executive vice president of football/player personnel – Marty Hurney; Senior vice president of football administration – Rob Rogers; Senior vice president of football strategy – Eugene Shen; Senior director of player personnel – Eric Stokes; Director of pro personnel – Chris Polian; Director of college personnel – Tim Gribble; Senior advisor – Doug Williams; Head coaches: Head coach – Ron Rivera; Assistant head coach/offensive coordinator – Eric Bieniemy; Offensive coaches: Quarterbacks – Tavita Pritchard; Assistant quarterbacks/offensive quality control – Luke Del Rio; Run game coordinator – Juan Castillo; Senior offensive assistant/running backs – Randy Jordan; Assistant running backs – Jennifer King; Wide receivers – Bobby Engram; Tight ends – Todd Storm; Offensive line – Travelle Wharton; Offensive assistant – Tyrae Reid Jr.; Offensive quality control – Shane Toub; Senior offensive advisor/game management – Ken Zampese	Defensive coaches: Defensive coordinator – Ron Rivera (interim); Defensive line – Jeff Zgonina; Assistant defensive line – Ryan Kerrigan; Linebackers – Steve Russ; Assistant linebackers – Vincent Rivera; Defensive backs – Cristian Garcia; Senior defensive assistant/safeties – Richard Rodgers Sr.; Defensive quality control – Reggie Howard; Special teams coaches: Special teams coordinator – Nate Kaczor; Assistant special teams – Ben Jacobs; Strength and conditioning: Head athletic trainer – Al Bellamy; Head strength and conditioning – Chad Englehart; Director of player performance – Brett Nenaber

== Roster ==
2023 Washington Commanders roster
Quarterbacks (QB): 12 Jacoby Brissett; 11 Jake Fromm; 14 Sam Howell; Running backs (RB): 40 Alex Armah FB; 24 Antonio Gibson; 38 Derrick Gore; 8 Brian Robinson Jr.; 18 Jonathan Williams; Wide receivers (WR): 2 Dyami Brown; 83 Jamison Crowder; 1 Jahan Dotson; 17 Terry McLaurin; 3 Byron Pringle; 4 Curtis Samuel; 86 Mitchell Tinsley; Tight ends (TE): 87 John Bates; 82 Logan Thomas; 85 Cole Turner	Offensive linemen (OL): 62 Alex Akingbulu LT; 77 Saahdiq Charles LG; 76 Sam Cosmi RG; 63 Nick Gates C; 61 Julian Good-Jones G; 78 Cornelius Lucas LT; 75 Chris Paul LG; 73 Trent Scott RT; 71 Andrew Wylie RT; Defensive linemen (DL): 93 Jonathan Allen DT; 92 Abdullah Anderson DT; 56 Jalen Harris DE; 55 KJ Henry DE; 50 Andre Jones Jr. DE; 98 Phidarian Mathis DT; 94 Daron Payne DT; 79 Benning Potoa'e DT; 59 Joshua Pryor DE; 91 John Ridgeway III DT; 96 James Smith-Williams DE; 95 Casey Toohill DE	Linebackers (LB): 57 Cody Barton MLB; 41 Jabril Cox OLB; 45 De'Jon Harris OLB; 47 Khaleke Hudson OLB; 51 David Mayo MLB; Defensive backs (DB): 32 Terrell Burgess SS; 31 Kamren Curl SS; 13 Emmanuel Forbes CB; 36 Kyu Blu Kelly CB; 20 Quan Martin FS; 25 Benjamin St-Juste CB; Special teams (ST): 58 Tucker Addington LS; 6 Joey Slye K; 5 Tress Way P	Practice squad: 10 Kazmeir Allen WR; 46 Brandon Bouyer-Randle OLB; 64 Mason Brooks G; 36 Sean Chandler SS; 84 Davion Davis WR; 60 Jaryd Jones-Smith G; 30 Joshua Kalu SS; 74 Nolan Laufenberg C; 16 D'Angelo Mandell CB; 32 Jaret Patterson RB; 89 Brycen Tremayne WR; 37 Nick Whiteside CB; 0 Jace Whittaker CB; Reserve: 64 David Bada DT (IR); 68 Curtis Brooks DT (IR); 35 Percy Butler FS (IR); 26 Tariq Castro-Fields CB (IR); 79 Braeden Daniels G (IR); 52 Jamin Davis MLB (IR); 46 Brandon Dillon TE (IR); 22 Darrick Forrest FS (IR); 29 Kendall Fuller CB (IR); 80 Curtis Hodges TE (IR); 34 Christian Holmes CB (IR); 69 Tyler Larsen C (IR); 72 Charles Leno LT (IR); 15 Dax Milne WR (IR); 97 Efe Obada DE (IR); 39 Jeremy Reaves SS (IR); 23 Chris Rodriguez Jr. RB (IR); 88 Armani Rogers TE (IR); 53 Ricky Stromberg C (IR); 58 Shaka Toney DE (Susp.); Rookies in italics 53 active, 20 reserve, 13 practice squad

== Schedule ==
=== Preseason ===
Week	Date	Opponent	Result	Record	Venue	Recap
1	August 11	at Cleveland Browns	**W** 17–15	1–0	Cleveland Browns Stadium	Recap
2	August 21	Baltimore Ravens	**W** 29–28	2–0	FedExField	Recap
3	August 26	Cincinnati Bengals	**W** 21–19	3–0	FedExField	Recap

=== Regular season ===
Week	Date	Opponent	Result	Record	Venue	Recap
1	September 10	Arizona Cardinals	**W** 20–16	1–0	FedExField	Recap
2	September 17	at Denver Broncos	**W** 35–33	2–0	Empower Field at Mile High	Recap
3	September 24	Buffalo Bills	**L** 3–37	2–1	FedExField	Recap
4	October 1	at **Philadelphia Eagles**	**L** 31–34 (OT)	2–2	Lincoln Financial Field	Recap
5	October 5	Chicago Bears	**L** 20–40	2–3	FedExField	Recap
6	October 15	at Atlanta Falcons	**W** 24–16	3–3	Mercedes-Benz Stadium	Recap
7	October 22	at **New York Giants**	**L** 7–14	3–4	MetLife Stadium	Recap
8	October 29	**Philadelphia Eagles**	**L** 31–38	3–5	FedExField	Recap
9	November 5	at New England Patriots	**W** 20–17	4–5	Gillette Stadium	Recap
10	November 12	at Seattle Seahawks	**L** 26–29	4–6	Lumen Field	Recap
11	November 19	**New York Giants**	**L** 19–31	4–7	FedExField	Recap
12	November 23	at **Dallas Cowboys**	**L** 10–45	4–8	AT&T Stadium	Recap
13	December 3	Miami Dolphins	**L** 15–45	4–9	FedExField	Recap
14	Bye					
15	December 17	at Los Angeles Rams	**L** 20–28	4–10	SoFi Stadium	Recap
16	December 24	at New York Jets	**L** 28–30	4–11	MetLife Stadium	Recap
17	December 31	San Francisco 49ers	**L** 10–27	4–12	FedExField	Recap
18	January 7	**Dallas Cowboys**	**L** 10–38	4–13	FedExField	Recap

Note: Intra-division opponents are in bold text.

=== Game summaries ===
==== Week 1: vs. Arizona Cardinals ====
Week 1: Arizona Cardinals at Washington Commanders – Game summary

Quarter	1	2	3	4	Total
Cardinals	3	10	3	0	**16**
**Commanders**	7	3	0	10	**20**

at FedExField, Landover, Maryland

- Date: September 10
- Game time: 1:00 p.m. EDT
- Game weather: Cloudy, 76 °F (24 °C)
- Game attendance: 64,693
- Referee: Alan Eck
- TV announcers (Fox): Adam Amin, Mark Schlereth and Kristina Pink
- Recap, Game Book

Game information

**First quarter**

- WAS – Brian Robinson Jr. 7-yard pass from Sam Howell (Joey Slye kick), 4:15. Commanders 7–0. **Drive: 6 plays, 91 yards, 3:20.**
- ARI – Matt Prater 28-yard field goal, 0:53. Commanders 7–3. **Drive: 8 plays, 64 yards, 3:22.**

**Second quarter**

- ARI – Matt Prater 54-yard field goal, 13:26. Commanders 7–6. **Drive: 4 plays, 1 yard, 1:20.**
- ARI – Cameron Thomas 2-yard fumble return (Matt Prater kick), 0:55. Cardinals 13–7.
- WAS – Joey Slye 30-yard field goal, 0:00. Cardinals 13–10. **Drive: 7 plays, 69 yards, 0:55.**

**Third quarter**

- ARI – Matt Prater 37-yard field goal, 10:09. Cardinals 16–10. **Drive: 11 plays, 56 yards, 4:51.**

**Fourth quarter**

- WAS – Sam Howell 6-yard run (Joey Slye kick), 11:48. Commanders 17–16. **Drive: 7 plays, 29 yards, 3:14.**
- WAS – Joey Slye 33-yard field goal, 2:23. Commanders 20–16. **Drive: 4 plays, 7 yards, 2:15.**

**Top passers**

- ARI – Joshua Dobbs – 21/30, 132 yards
- WAS – Sam Howell – 19/31, 202 yards, TD, INT

**Top rushers**

- ARI – James Conner – 14 rushes, 62 yards
- WAS – Brian Robinson Jr. – 19 rushes, 59 yards

**Top receivers**

- ARI – Rondale Moore – 3 receptions, 33 yards
- WAS – Curtis Samuel – 5 receptions, 54 yards

==== Week 2: at Denver Broncos ====
Week 2: Washington Commanders at Denver Broncos – Game summary

Quarter	1	2	3	4	Total
**Commanders**	3	11	7	14	**35**
Broncos	14	7	3	9	**33**

at Empower Field at Mile High, Denver, Colorado

- Date: September 17
- Game time: 4:25 p.m. EDT/2:25 p.m. MDT
- Game weather: Sunny, 81 °F (27 °C)
- Game attendance: 76,108
- Referee: Brad Rogers
- TV announcers (CBS): Spero Dedes, Adam Archuleta and Aditi Kinkhabwala
- Recap, Game Book

Game information

**First quarter**

- DEN – Jaleel McLaughlin 5-yard run (Wil Lutz kick), 6:14. Broncos 7–0. **Drive: 7 plays, 61 yards, 4:05.**
- WAS – Joey Slye 44-yard field goal, 0:24. Broncos 7–3. **Drive: 11 plays, 50 yards, 5:50.**
- DEN – Marvin Mims 60-yard pass from Russell Wilson (Wil Lutz kick), 0:12. Broncos 14–3. **Drive: 1 plays, 75 yards, 0:12.**

**Second quarter**

- DEN – Brandon Johnson 16-yard pass from Russell Wilson (Wil Lutz kick), 9:01. Broncos 21–3. **Drive: 9 plays, 90 yards, 5:01.**
- WAS – Logan Thomas 4-yard pass from Sam Howell (Brian Robinson Jr. run), 1:47. Broncos 21–11. **Drive: 9 plays, 49 yards, 4:47.**
- WAS – Joey Slye 49-yard field goal, 0:00. Broncos 21–14. **Drive: 8 plays, 46 yards, 1:20.**

**Third quarter**

- WAS – Terry McLaurin 30-yard pass from Sam Howell (Joey Slye kick), 11:47. Tied 21–21. **Drive: 5 plays, 57 yards, 2:01.**
- DEN – Wil Lutz 31-yard field goal, 2:11. Broncos 24–21. **Drive: 9 plays, 38 yards, 5:21.**

**Fourth quarter**

- WAS – Brian Robinson Jr. 2-yard run (Joey Slye kick), 13:25. Commanders 28–24. **Drive: 6 plays, 75 yards, 3:46.**
- WAS – Brian Robinson Jr. 15-yard run (Joey Slye kick), 7:11. Commanders 35–24. **Drive: 8 plays, 64 yards, 5:11.**
- DEN – Wil Lutz 32-yard field goal, 1:50. Commanders 35–27. **Drive: 15 plays, 61 yards, 5:21.**
- DEN – Brandon Johnson 50-yard pass from Russell Wilson (pass failed), 0:00. Commanders 35–33. **Drive: 7 plays, 87 yards, 0:48.**

**Top passers**

- WAS – Sam Howell – 27/39, 299 yards, 2 TD
- DEN – Russell Wilson – 18/32, 308 yards, 3 TD, INT

**Top rushers**

- WAS – Brian Robinson Jr. – 18 rushes, 87 yards
- DEN – Russell Wilson – 6 rushes, 56 yards

**Top receivers**

- WAS – Terry McLaurin – 5 receptions, 54 yards, TD
- DEN – Marvin Mims – 2 receptions, 113 yards, TD

==== Week 3: vs. Buffalo Bills ====
Week 3: Buffalo Bills at Washington Commanders – Game summary

Quarter	1	2	3	4	Total
**Bills**	10	6	0	21	**37**
Commanders	0	0	0	3	**3**

at FedExField, Landover, Maryland

- Date: September 24
- Game time: 1:00 p.m. EDT
- Game weather: Rain, 65 °F (18 °C)
- Game attendance: 64,291
- Referee: Land Clark
- TV announcers (CBS): Andrew Catalon, Tiki Barber, Matt Ryan and AJ Ross
- Recap, Game Book

Game information

**First quarter**

- BUF – Tyler Bass 36-yard field goal, 9:29. Bills 3-0. **Drive: 11 plays, 57 yards, 5:31.**
- BUF – Gabe Davis 35-yard pass from Josh Allen (Tyler Bass kick), 0:41. Bills 10-0. **Drive: 1 play, 35 yards, 0:06.**

**Second quarter**

- BUF – Tyler Bass 54-yard field goal, 1:55. Bills 13-0. **Drive: 15 plays, 62 yards, 9:47.**
- BUF – Tyler Bass 32-yard field goal, 0:19. Bills 16-0. **Drive: 6 plays, 19 yards, 0:56.**

**Third quarter**

- No scoring plays.

**Fourth quarter**

- BUF – Josh Allen 10-yard run (Tyler Bass kick), 10:37. Bills 23-0. **Drive: 6 plays, 31 yards, 3:28.**
- BUF – A. J. Epenesa 32-yard interception return (Tyler Bass kick), 10:01. Bills 30-0.
- BUF – Latavius Murray 2-yard run (Tyler Bass kick), 2:15. Bills 37-0. **Drive: 9 plays, 64 yards, 5:57.**
- WAS – Joey Slye 51-yard field goal, 0:46. Bills 37-3. **Drive: 8 plays, 42 yards, 1:29.**

**Top passers**

- BUF – Josh Allen – 20/32, 218 yards, TD, INT
- WAS – Sam Howell – 19/29, 170 yards, 4 INT

**Top rushers**

- BUF – James Cook – 15 rushes, 98 yards
- WAS – Brian Robinson Jr. – 10 rushes, 70 yards

**Top receivers**

- BUF – Stefon Diggs – 8 receptions, 111 yards
- WAS – Curtis Samuel – 2 receptions, 54 yards

==== Week 4: at Philadelphia Eagles ====
Week 4: Washington Commanders at Philadelphia Eagles – Game summary

Quarter	1	2	3	4	OT	Total
Commanders	7	10	0	14	0	**31**
**Eagles**	7	3	11	10	3	**34**

at Lincoln Financial Field, Philadelphia, Pennsylvania

- Date: October 1
- Game time: 1:00 p.m. EDT
- Game weather: 76 °F (24 °C)
- Game attendance: 69,879
- Referee: Ronald Torbert
- TV announcers (Fox): Joe Davis, Daryl Johnston and Pam Oliver
- Recap, Game Book

Game information

**First quarter**

- WAS – Curtis Samuel 1-yard run (Joey Slye kick), 7:52. Commanders 7-0. **Drive: 14 plays, 75 yards, 7:08.**
- PHI – D'Andre Swift 5-yard run (Jake Elliott kick), 1:17. Tied 7-7. **Drive: 12 plays, 75 yards, 6:35.**

**Second quarter**

- WAS – Terry McLaurin fumble recovery in the end zone (Joey Slye kick), 12:56. Commanders 14-7. **Drive: 7 plays, 75 yards, 3:21.**
- WAS – Joey Slye 27-yard field goal, 1:39. Commanders 17-7. **Drive: 11 plays, 65 yards, 4:27.**
- PHI – Jake Elliott 41-yard field goal, 0:00. Commanders 17-10. **Drive: 8 plays, 52 yards, 1:39.**

**Third quarter**

- PHI – Jake Elliott 47-yard field goal, 11:38. Commanders 17-13. **Drive: 9 plays, 45 yards, 3:22.**
- PHI – A. J. Brown 59-yard pass from Jalen Hurts (Kenneth Gainwell run), 7:11. Eagles 21-17. **Drive: 4 plays, 74 yards, 2:13.**

**Fourth quarter**

- PHI – Jake Elliott 36-yard field goal, 14:15. Eagles 24-17. **Drive: 10 plays, 51 yards, 4:59.**
- WAS – Brian Robinson Jr. 15-yard run (Joey Slye kick), 8:01. Tied 24-24. **Drive: 11 plays, 75 yards, 6:14.**
- PHI – A. J. Brown 28-yard pass from Jalen Hurts (Jake Elliott kick), 1:43. Eagles 31-24. **Drive: 6 plays, 57 yards, 1:37.**
- WAS - Jahan Dotson 10-yard pass from Sam Howell (Joey Slye kick), 0:00. Tied 31-31. **Drive: 10 plays, 64 yards, 1:43.**

**Overtime**

- PHI – Jake Elliott 54-yard field goal, 3:58. Eagles 34-31. **Drive: 10 plays, 23 yards, 4:28.**

**Top passers**

- WAS – Sam Howell – 29/41, 290 yards, TD
- PHI – Jalen Hurts – 25/37, 319 yards, 2 TD

**Top rushers**

- WAS – Brian Robinson Jr. – 14 rushes, 45 yards, TD
- PHI – D'Andre Swift – 14 rushes, 56 yards, TD

**Top receivers**

- WAS – Terry McLaurin – 8 receptions, 86 yards
- PHI – A. J. Brown – 9 receptions, 175 yards, 2 TD

==== Week 5: vs. Chicago Bears ====
Week 5: Chicago Bears at Washington Commanders – Game summary

Quarter	1	2	3	4	Total
**Bears**	10	17	0	13	**40**
Commanders	0	3	11	6	**20**

at FedExField, Landover, Maryland

- Date: October 5
- Game time: 8:15 p.m. EDT
- Game weather: Cloudy, 70 °F (21 °C)
- Game attendance: 63,727
- Referee: Scott Novak
- TV announcers (WTTG/Prime Video): Al Michaels, Kirk Herbstreit and Kaylee Hartung
- Recap, Game Book

Game information

**First quarter**

- CHI – D. J. Moore 20-yard pass from Justin Fields (Cairo Santos kick), 12:04. Bears 7–0. **Drive: 6 plays, 75 yards, 2:56.**
- CHI – Cairo Santos 20-yard field goal, 4:18. Bears 10–0. **Drive: 11 plays, 70 yards, 5:33.**

**Second quarter**

- CHI – D. J. Moore 11-yard pass from Justin Fields (Cairo Santos kick), 14:15. Bears 17–0. **Drive: 6 plays, 69 yards, 2:37.**
- WAS – Joey Slye 51-yard field goal, 8:33. Bears 17–3. **Drive: 11 plays, 42 yards, 5:42.**
- CHI – Cairo Santos 36-yard field goal, 2:24. Bears 20–3. **Drive: 13 plays, 57 yards, 6:09.**
- CHI – Cole Kmet 4-yard pass from Justin Fields (Cairo Santos kick), 00:24. Bears 27–3. **Drive: 6 plays, 36 yards, 1:55.**

**Third quarter**

- WAS – Logan Thomas 2-yard pass from Sam Howell (Sam Howell run), 12:00. Bears 27–11. **Drive: 5 plays, 75 yards, 3:00.**
- WAS – Joey Slye 32-yard field goal, 3:17. Bears 27–14. **Drive: 7 plays, 70 yards, 4:23.**

**Fourth quarter**

- CHI – Cairo Santos 43-yard field goal, 14:09. Bears 30–14. **Drive: 8 plays, 50 yards, 4:08.**
- WAS – Curtis Samuel 3-yard pass from Sam Howell (pass failed), 10:51. Bears 30–20. **Drive: 12 plays, 75 yards, 3:18.**
- CHI – D. J. Moore 56-yard pass from Justin Fields (Cairo Santos kick), 4:09. Bears 37–20. **Drive: 3 plays, 64 yards, 1:02.**
- CHI – Cairo Santos 37-yard field goal, 1:56. Bears 40–20. **Drive: 4 plays, 7 yards, 0:34.**

**Top passers**

- CHI – Justin Fields – 15/29, 282 yards, 4 TD
- WAS – Sam Howell – 37/51, 388 yards, 2 TD, INT

**Top rushers**

- CHI – Khalil Herbert – 10 rushes, 76 yards
- WAS – Sam Howell – 4 rushes, 19 yards

**Top receivers**

- CHI – D. J. Moore – 8 receptions, 230 yards, 3 TD
- WAS – Logan Thomas – 9 receptions, 77 yards, TD

==== Week 6: at Atlanta Falcons ====
Week 6: Washington Commanders at Atlanta Falcons – Game summary

Quarter	1	2	3	4	Total
**Commanders**	3	14	7	0	**24**
Falcons	7	3	0	6	**16**

at Mercedes-Benz Stadium, Atlanta, Georgia

- Date: October 15
- Game time: 1:00 p.m. EDT
- Game weather: None (retractable roof closed)
- Game attendance: 69,921
- Referee: Clete Blakeman
- TV announcers (CBS): Andrew Catalon, Tiki Barber, Matt Ryan and AJ Ross
- Recap, Game Book

Game information

**First quarter**

- WAS – Joey Slye 37-yard field goal, 8:45. Commanders 3–0. **Drive: 12 plays, 56 yards, 6:15.**
- ATL – Kyle Pitts 9-yard pass from Desmond Ridder (Younghoe Koo kick), 2:46. Falcons 7–3. **Drive: 11 plays, 75 yards, 5:59.**

**Second quarter**

- WAS – Antonio Gibson 1-yard pass from Sam Howell (Joey Slye kick), 11:47. Commanders 10–7. **Drive: 3 plays, 11 yards, 1:30.**
- WAS – Curtis Samuel 7-yard pass from Sam Howell (Joey Slye kick), 5:18. Commanders 17–7. **Drive: 7 plays, 52 yards, 3:02.**
- ATL – Younghoe Koo 47-yard field goal, 1:31. Commanders 17–10. **Drive: 10 plays, 46 yards, 3:47.**

**Third quarter**

- WAS – Brian Robinson Jr. 24-yard pass from Sam Howell (Joey Slye kick), 12:03. Commanders 24–10. **Drive: 2 plays, 27 yards, 0:52.**

**Fourth quarter**

- ATL – Jonnu Smith 2-yard pass from Desmond Ridder (run failed), 12:38. Commanders 24–16. **Drive: 12 plays, 81 yards, 6:53.**

**Top passers**

- WAS – Sam Howell – 14/23, 151 yards, 3 TD
- ATL – Desmond Ridder – 28/47, 307 yards, 2 TD, 3 INT

**Top rushers**

- WAS – Brian Robinson Jr. – 10 rushes, 31 yards
- ATL – Tyler Allgeier – 13 rushes, 51 yards

**Top receivers**

- WAS – Terry McLaurin – 6 receptions, 81 yards
- ATL – Drake London – 9 receptions, 125 yards

==== Week 7: at New York Giants ====
Week 7: Washington Commanders at New York Giants – Game summary

Quarter	1	2	3	4	Total
Commanders	0	0	7	0	**7**
**Giants**	0	14	0	0	**14**

at MetLife Stadium, East Rutherford, New Jersey

- Date: October 22
- Game time: 1:00 p.m. EDT
- Game weather: Mostly cloudy, 54 °F (12 °C)
- Game attendance: 81,671
- Referee: John Hussey
- TV announcers (CBS): Andrew Catalon, Tiki Barber, Matt Ryan and AJ Ross
- Recap, Game Book

Game information

**First quarter**

- No scoring plays.

**Second quarter**

- NYG – Darren Waller 15-yard pass from Tyrod Taylor (Graham Gano kick), 14:18. Giants 7–0. **Drive: 8 plays, 88 yards, 4:33.**
- NYG – Saquon Barkley 32-yard pass from Tyrod Taylor (Graham Gano kick), 8:56. Giants 14–0. **Drive: 2 plays, 48 yards, 0:38.**

**Third quarter**

- WAS – Brian Robinson Jr. 4-yard run (Joey Slye kick), 10:21. Giants 14–7. **Drive: 6 plays, 21 yards, 2:48.**

**Fourth quarter**

- No scoring plays.

**Top passers**

- WAS – Sam Howell – 22/42, 249 yards, INT
- NYG – Tyrod Taylor – 18/29, 279 yards, 2 TD

**Top rushers**

- WAS – Brian Robinson Jr. – 8 rushes, 23 yards, TD
- NYG – Saquon Barkley – 21 rushes, 77 yards

**Top receivers**

- WAS – Terry McLaurin – 6 receptions, 90 yards
- NYG – Darren Waller – 7 receptions, 98 yards, TD

==== Week 8: vs. Philadelphia Eagles ====
Week 8: Philadelphia Eagles at Washington Commanders – Game summary

Quarter	1	2	3	4	Total
**Eagles**	3	7	7	21	**38**
Commanders	7	10	0	14	**31**

at FedExField, Landover, Maryland

- Date: October 29
- Game time: 1:00 p.m. EDT
- Game weather: Cloudy, 69 °F (21 °C)
- Game attendance: 64,653
- Referee: Carl Cheffers
- TV announcers (Fox): Chris Myers, Mark Schlereth and Kristina Pink
- Recap, Game Book

Game information

**First quarter**

- WAS – Terry McLaurin 26-yard pass from Sam Howell (Joey Slye kick), 7:13. Commanders 7–0. **Drive: 3 plays, 62 yard, 0:54.**
- PHI – Jake Elliott 51-yard field goal, 2:11. Commanders 7–3. **Drive: 11 plays, 42 yards, 5:02.**

**Second quarter**

- WAS – Jahan Dotson 21-yard pass from Sam Howell (Joey Slye kick), 12:40. Commanders 14–3. **Drive: 9 plays, 75 yard, 4:31.**
- PHI – A. J. Brown 16-yard pass from Jalen Hurts (Jake Elliott kick), 0:34. Commanders 14–10. **Drive: 7 plays, 65 yards, 1:14.**
- WAS – Joey Slye 61-yard field goal, 0:01. Commanders 17–10. **Drive: 5 plays, 32 yards, 0:33.**

**Third quarter**

- PHI – A. J. Brown 25-yard pass from Jalen Hurts (Jake Elliott kick), 4:17. Tied 17–17. **Drive: 7 plays, 51 yards, 3:30.**

**Fourth quarter**

- WAS – Logan Thomas 7-yard pass from Sam Howell (Joey Slye kick), 12:03. Commanders 24–17. **Drive: 14 plays, 75 yards, 7:14.**
- PHI – DeVonta Smith 38-yard pass from Jalen Hurts (Jake Elliott kick), 8:47. Tied 24–24. **Drive: 7 plays, 75 yards, 3:16.**
- PHI – Julio Jones 8-yard pass from Jalen Hurts (Jake Elliott kick), 7:17. Eagles 31–24. **Drive: 2 plays, 7 yards, 0:45.**
- PHI – D'Andre Swift 7-yard run (Jake Elliott kick), 1:50. Eagles 38–24. **Drive: 3 plays, 16 yards, 0:23.**
- WAS – Jamison Crowder 26-yard pass from Sam Howell (Joey Slye kick), 1:01. Eagles 38–31. **Drive: 4 plays, 72 yards, 0:49.**

**Top passers**

- PHI – Jalen Hurts – 29/38, 319 yards, 4 TD
- WAS – Sam Howell – 39/52, 397 yards, 4 TD, INT

**Top rushers**

- PHI – D'Andre Swift – 16 rushes, 57 yards, TD
- WAS – Brian Robinson Jr. – 10 rushes, 59 yards

**Top receivers**

- PHI – A. J. Brown – 8 receptions, 130 yards, 2 TD
- WAS – Jahan Dotson – 8 receptions, 108 yards, TD

==== Week 9: at New England Patriots ====
Week 9: Washington Commanders at New England Patriots – Game summary

Quarter	1	2	3	4	Total
**Commanders**	3	7	10	0	**20**
Patriots	0	14	3	0	**17**

at Gillette Stadium, Foxborough, Massachusetts

- Date: November 5
- Game time: 1:00 p.m. EST
- Game weather: Mostly sunny, 62 °F (17 °C)
- Game attendance: 64,628
- Referee: Adrian Hill
- TV announcers (Fox): Kenny Albert, Jonathan Vilma and Shannon Spake
- Recap, Game Book

Game information

**First quarter**

- WAS – Joey Slye 37-yard field goal, 3:14. Commanders 3–0. **Drive: 9 plays, 42 yards, 5:20.**

**Second quarter**

- WAS – Brian Robinson Jr. 9-yard run (Joey Slye kick), 12:05. Commanders 10–0. **Drive: 11 plays, 80 yards, 5:16.**
- NE – Hunter Henry 14-yard pass from Mac Jones (Chad Ryland kick), 9:26. Commanders 10–7. **Drive: 3 plays, 25 yards, 0:59.**
- NE – Rhamondre Stevenson 64-yard run (Chad Ryland kick), 6:06. Patriots 14–10. **Drive: 2 plays, 84 yards, 0:35.**

**Third quarter**

- NE – Chad Ryland 43-yard field goal, 10:14. Patriots 17–10. **Drive: 12 plays, 51 yards, 4:46.**
- WAS – Jahan Dotson 33-yard pass from Sam Howell (Joey Slye kick), 6:51. Tied 17–17. **Drive: 7 plays, 75 yards, 3:23.**
- WAS – Joey Slye 30-yard field goal, 1:49. Commanders 20–17. **Drive: 8 plays, 65 yards, 2:50.**

**Fourth quarter**

- No scoring plays.

**Top passers**

- WAS – Sam Howell – 29/45, 325 yards, TD, INT
- NE – Mac Jones – 24/44, 240 yards, TD, INT

**Top rushers**

- WAS – Brian Robinson Jr. – 18 rushes, 63 yards, TD
- NE – Rhamondre Stevenson – 9 rushes, 87 yards, TD

**Top receivers**

- WAS – Terry McLaurin – 5 receptions, 73 yards
- NE – Demario Douglas – 5 receptions, 55 yards

==== Week 10: at Seattle Seahawks ====
Week 10: Washington Commanders at Seattle Seahawks – Game summary

Quarter	1	2	3	4	Total
Commanders	6	3	3	14	**26**
**Seahawks**	3	6	7	13	**29**

at Lumen Field, Seattle, Washington

- Date: November 12
- Game time: 4:25 p.m. EST/1:25 p.m. PST
- Game weather: Cloudy, 52 °F (11 °C)
- Game attendance: 68,721
- Referee: Alex Kemp
- TV announcers (Fox): Kevin Kugler, Mark Sanchez and Laura Okmin
- Recap, Game Book

Game information

**First quarter**

- WAS – Brian Robinson Jr. 51-yard pass from Sam Howell (kick failed), 13:26. Commanders 6–0. **Drive: 4 play, 65 yards, 1:34.**
- SEA – Jason Myers 45-yard field goal, 8:43. Commanders 6–3. **Drive: 9 plays, 49 yards, 4:43.**

**Second quarter**

- WAS – Joey Slye 49-yard field goal, 12:06. Commanders 9–3. **Drive: 10 plays, 41 yards, 5:15.**
- SEA – Jason Myers 43-yard field goal, 9:12. Commanders 9–6. **Drive: 10 plays, 51 yards, 2:54.**
- SEA – Jason Myers 33-yard field goal, 1:47. Tied 9–9. **Drive: 10 plays, 54 yards, 3:02.**

**Third quarter**

- WAS – Joey Slye 47-yard field goal, 10:32. Commanders 12–9. **Drive: 6 plays, 41 yards, 2:24.**
- SEA – Kenneth Walker III 64-yard pass from Geno Smith (Jason Myers kick), 9:43. Seahawks 16–12. **Drive: 2 plays, 75 yards, 0:49.**

**Fourth quarter**

- SEA – Jason Myers 45-yard field goal, 12:14. Seahawks 19–12. **Drive: 11 plays, 55 yards, 4:47.**
- WAS – Antonio Gibson 19-yard pass from Sam Howell (Joey Slye kick), 8:00. Tied 19–19. **Drive: 8 plays, 73 yards, 4:14.**
- SEA – Tyler Lockett 5-yard pass from Geno Smith (Jason Myers kick), 3:49. Seahawks 26–19. **Drive: 10 plays, 75 yards, 4:13.**
- WAS – Dyami Brown 35-yard pass from Sam Howell (Joey Slye kick), 0:52. Tied 26–26. **Drive: 10 plays, 71 yards, 2:55.**
- SEA – Jason Myers 43-yard field goal, 0:00. Seahawks 29–26. **Drive: 7 plays, 50 yards, 0:52.**

**Top passers**

- WAS – Sam Howell – 29/44, 312 yards, 3 TD
- SEA – Geno Smith – 31/47, 369 yards, 2 TD

**Top rushers**

- WAS – Brian Robinson Jr. – 8 rushes, 38 yards
- SEA – Kenneth Walker III – 19 rushes, 63 yards

**Top receivers**

- WAS – Brian Robinson Jr. – 6 receptions, 119 yards, TD
- SEA – Tyler Lockett – 8 receptions, 92 yards, TD

==== Week 11: vs. New York Giants ====
Week 11: New York Giants at Washington Commanders – Game summary

Quarter	1	2	3	4	Total
**Giants**	7	7	0	17	**31**
Commanders	3	6	3	7	**19**

at FedExField, Landover, Maryland

- Date: November 19
- Game time: 1:00 p.m. EST
- Game weather: Sunny, 56 °F (13 °C)
- Game attendance: 62,714
- Referee: Brad Allen
- TV announcers (Fox): Kenny Albert, Jonathan Vilma and Shannon Spake
- Recap, Game Book

Game information

**First quarter**

- NYG – Saquon Barkley 24-yard pass from Tommy DeVito (Randy Bullock kick), 6:29. Giants 7–0. **Drive: 4 plays, 45 yards, 1:10.**
- WAS – Joey Slye 23-yard field goal, 2:12. Giants 7–3. **Drive: 9 plays, 70 yards, 4:17.**

**Second quarter**

- NYG – Darius Slayton 40-yard pass from Tommy DeVito (Randy Bullock kick), 5:58. Giants 14–3. **Drive: 6 plays, 62 yards, 2:45.**
- WAS – Sam Howell 7-yard run (kick failed), 1:32. Giants 14–9. **Drive: 12 plays, 75 yards, 4:26.**

**Third quarter**

- WAS – Joey Slye 42-yard field goal, 5:43. Giants 14–12. **Drive: 13 plays, 68 yards, 7:37.**

**Fourth quarter**

- NYG – Saquon Barkley 5-yard pass from Tommy DeVito (Randy Bullock kick), 13:32. Giants 21–12. **Drive: 5 plays, 68 yards, 2:10.**
- NYG – Randy Bullock 36-yard field goal, 6:48. Giants 24–12. **Drive: 7 plays, 46 yards, 4:23.**
- WAS – Jahan Dotson 8-yard pass from Sam Howell (Joey Slye kick), 2:16. Giants 24–19. **Drive: 12 plays, 75 yards, 4:32.**
- NYG – Isaiah Simmons 54-yard interception return (Randy Bullock kick), 0:16. Giants 31–19.

**Top passers**

- NYG – Tommy DeVito – 18/26, 246 yards, 3 TD
- WAS – Sam Howell – 31/45, 255 yards, TD, 3 INT

**Top rushers**

- NYG – Saquon Barkley – 14 rushes, 83 yards
- WAS – Brian Robinson Jr. – 17 rushes, 73 yards

**Top receivers**

- NYG – Darius Slayton – 4 receptions, 82 yards, TD
- WAS – Logan Thomas – 5 receptions, 58 yards

The Commanders' offense committed six turnovers throughout the game. With a chance to win the game, Isaiah Simmons intercepted Sam Howell for a touchdown that put the game away. The Commanders fall to 4–7.

==== Week 12: at Dallas Cowboys ====
Thanksgiving Day games

Week 12: Washington Commanders at Dallas Cowboys – Game summary

Quarter	1	2	3	4	Total
Commanders	0	10	0	0	**10**
**Cowboys**	7	13	0	25	**45**

at AT&T Stadium, Arlington, Texas

- Date: November 23
- Game time: 4:30 p.m. EST/3:30 p.m. CST
- Game weather: None (retractable roof closed)
- Game attendance: 93,711
- Referee: Bill Vinovich
- TV announcers (CBS): Jim Nantz, Tony Romo and Tracy Wolfson
- Recap, Game Book

Game information

**First quarter**

- DAL – Rico Dowdle 15-yard pass from Dak Prescott (Brandon Aubrey kick), 0:46. Cowboys 7–0. **Drive: 11 plays, 90 yards, 5:07.**

**Second quarter**

- WAS – Joey Slye 43-yard field goal, 11:27. Cowboys 7–3. **Drive: 9 plays, 50 yards, 4:19.**
- DAL – Brandin Cooks 31-yard pass from Dak Prescott (Brandon Aubrey kick), 8:27. Cowboys 14–3. **Drive: 6 plays, 75 yards, 3:00.**
- WAS – Sam Howell 1-yard run (Joey Slye kick), 1:51. Cowboys 14–10. **Drive: 13 plays, 75 yards, 6:36.**
- DAL – Tony Pollard 7-yard run (kick failed), 0:26. Cowboys 20–10. **Drive: 5 plays, 75 yards, 1:25.**

**Third quarter**

- No scoring plays.

**Fourth quarter**

- DAL – Brandon Aubrey 52-yard field goal, 13:36. Cowboys 23–10. **Drive: 10 plays, 49 yards, 4:17.**
- DAL – CeeDee Lamb 15-yard pass from Dak Prescott (Dak Prescott-CeeDee Lamb pass), 10:32. Cowboys 31–10. **Drive: 3 plays, 24 yards, 1:24.**
- DAL – KaVontae Turpin 34-yard pass from Dak Prescott (Brandon Aubrey kick), 5:59. Cowboys 38–10. **Drive: 5 plays, 65 yards, 2:51.**
- DAL – DaRon Bland 63-yard interception return (Brandon Aubrey kick), 4:39. Cowboys 45–10.

**Top passers**

- WAS – Sam Howell – 28/44, 300 yards, INT
- DAL – Dak Prescott – 22/32, 331 yards, 4 TD

**Top rushers**

- WAS – Brian Robinson Jr. – 15 rushes, 53 yards
- DAL – Tony Pollard – 13 rushes, 79 yards, TD

**Top receivers**

- WAS – Curtis Samuel – 9 receptions, 100 yards
- DAL – Tony Pollard – 6 receptions, 24 yards

With the blowout loss, the Commanders were eliminated from NFC East contention. After the game, the team fired defensive coordinator Jack Del Rio and defensive backs coach Brent Vieselmeyer. This was Washington's first Thanksgiving appearance as the Commanders.

==== Week 13: vs. Miami Dolphins ====
Week 13: Miami Dolphins at Washington Commanders – Game summary

Quarter	1	2	3	4	Total
**Dolphins**	17	14	7	7	**45**
Commanders	0	7	8	0	**15**

at FedExField, Landover, Maryland

- Date: December 3
- Game time: 1:00 p.m. EST
- Game weather: Cloudy, 53 °F (12 °C)
- Game attendance: 63,459
- Referee: Tra Blake
- TV announcers (Fox): Adam Amin, Mark Schlereth and Kristina Pink
- Recap, Game Book

Game information

**First quarter**

- MIA – Tyreek Hill 78-yard pass from Tua Tagovailoa (Jason Sanders kick), 9:28. Dolphins 7–0. **Drive: 3 plays, 86 yards, 1:28.**
- MIA – Jason Sanders 49-yard field goal, 3:39. Dolphins 10–0. **Drive: 8 plays, 39 yards, 4:15.**
- MIA – Andrew Van Ginkel 33-yard interception return (Jason Sanders kick), 0:20. Dolphins 17–0.

**Second quarter**

- WAS – Sam Howell 1-yard run (Joey Slye kick), 11:18. Dolphins 17–7. **Drive: 10 plays, 75 yards, 4:37.**
- MIA – Tyreek Hill 60-yard pass from Tua Tagovailoa (Jason Sanders kick), 9:14. **Drive: 5 plays, 75 yards, 2:04.**
- MIA – Raheem Mostert 1-yard run (Jason Sanders kick), 0:20. Dolphins 31–7. **Drive: 11 plays, 76 yards, 5:35.**

**Third quarter**

- MIA – De'Von Achane 4-yard run (Jason Sanders kick), 9:36. Dolphins 38–7. **Drive: 9 plays, 75 yards, 4:24.**
- WAS – Sam Howell 13-yard run (Sam Howell-Logan Thomas pass), 4:31. Dolphins 38–15. **Drive: 9 plays, 75 yards, 5:05.**

**Fourth quarter**

- MIA – De'Von Achane 2-yard run (Jason Sanders kick), 1:57. Dolphins 45–15. **Drive: 13 plays, 59 yards, 7:50.**

**Top passers**

- MIA – Tua Tagovailoa – 18/24, 280 yards, 2 TD
- WAS – Sam Howell – 12/23, 127 yards, INT

**Top rushers**

- MIA – De'Von Achane – 17 rushes, 73 yards, 2 TD
- WAS – Brian Robinson Jr. – 7 rushes, 53 yards

**Top receivers**

- MIA – Tyreek Hill – 5 receptions, 157 yards, 2 TD
- WAS – Curtis Samuel – 4 receptions, 65 yards

==== Week 15: at Los Angeles Rams ====
Week 15: Washington Commanders at Los Angeles Rams – Game summary

Quarter	1	2	3	4	Total
Commanders	0	0	7	13	**20**
**Rams**	3	10	7	8	**28**

at SoFi Stadium, Inglewood, California

- Date: December 17
- Game time: 4:05 p.m. EST/1:05 p.m. PST
- Game weather: Cloudy, 78 °F (26 °C) (retractable roof open)
- Game attendance: 72,035
- Referee: Alan Eck
- TV announcers (CBS): Tom McCarthy, James Lofton, Jay Feely and Tiffany Blackmon
- Recap, Game Book

Game information

**First quarter**

- LAR – Lucas Havrisik 22-yard field goal, 7:39. Rams 3–0. **Drive: 11 plays, 77 yards, 6:32.**

**Second quarter**

- LAR – Kyren Williams 1-yard run (Lucas Havrisik kick), 2:19. Rams 10–0. **Drive: 10 plays, 53 yards, 5:11.**
- LAR – Lucas Havrisik 27-yard field goal, 0:03. Rams 13–0. **Drive: 6 plays, 6 yards, 0:31.**

**Third quarter**

- LAR – Cooper Kupp 62-yard pass from Matthew Stafford (Lucas Havrisik kick), 14:07. Rams 20–0. **Drive: 2 plays, 75 yards, 0:53.**
- WAS – Curtis Samuel 19-yard pass from Sam Howell (Joey Slye kick), 6:25. Rams 20–7. **Drive: plays, 48 yards, 2:48.**

**Fourth quarter**

- LAR – Demarcus Robinson 23-yard pass from Matthew Stafford (Kyren Williams run), 13:25. Rams 28–7. **Drive: 5 plays, 51 yards, 1:51.**
- WAS – Terry McLaurin 29-yard pass from Jacoby Brissett (Joey Slye kick), 7:17. Rams 28–14. **Drive: 5 plays, 67 yards, 1:48.**
- WAS – Curtis Samuel 3-yard pass from Jacoby Brissett (kick blocked), 1:46. Rams 28–20. **Drive: 9 plays, 65 yards, 3:17.**

**Top passers**

- WAS – Sam Howell – 11/26, 102 yards, TD, INT
- LAR – Matthew Stafford – 25/33, 258 yards, 2 TD

**Top rushers**

- WAS – Chris Rodriguez Jr. – 10 rushes, 35 yards
- LAR – Kyren Williams – 27 rushes, 152 yards, TD

**Top receivers**

- WAS – Terry McLaurin – 6 receptions, 141 yards, TD
- LAR – Cooper Kupp – 8 receptions, 111 yards, TD

Despite the Commanders reaching the one yard line with just under five minutes left, just under two minutes remained when they finally scored.

==== Week 16: at New York Jets ====
Week 16: Washington Commanders at New York Jets – Game summary

Quarter	1	2	3	4	Total
Commanders	0	7	7	14	**28**
**Jets**	17	10	0	3	**30**

at MetLife Stadium, East Rutherford, New Jersey

- Date: December 24
- Game time: 1:00 p.m. EST
- Game weather: Mostly cloudy, 47 °F (8 °C)
- Game attendance: 67,470
- Referee: Clay Martin
- TV announcers (CBS): Spero Dedes, Adam Archuleta and Aditi Kinkhabwala
- Recap, Game Book

Game information

**First quarter**

- NYJ – Greg Zuerlein 13-yard field goal, 13:00. Jets 3–0. **Drive: 5 plays, 17 yard, 1:50.**
- NYJ – Jason Brownlee 8-yard pass from Trevor Siemian (Greg Zuerlein kick), 11:26. Jets 10–0. **Drive: 3 plays, 9 yard, 0:29.**
- NYJ – Breece Hall 36-yard run (Greg Zuerlein kick), 9:37. Jets 17–0. **Drive: 2 plays, 42 yard, 0:41.**

**Second quarter**

- NYJ – Greg Zuerlein 27-yard field goal, 9:10. Jets 20–0. **Drive: 7 plays, 44 yard, 2:29.**
- WAS – Chris Rodriguez Jr. 12-yard run (Joey Slye kick), 6:38. Jets 20–7. **Drive: 1 plays, 12 yards, 0:10.**
- NYJ – Breece Hall 2-yard run (Greg Zuerlein kick), 1:35. Jets 27–7. **Drive: 11 plays, 71 yard, 5:03.**

**Third quarter**

- WAS – Logan Thomas 15-yard pass from Jacoby Brissett (Joey Slye kick), 3:26. Jets 27–14. **Drive: 6 plays, 29 yards, 3:17.**

**Fourth quarter**

- WAS – Chris Rodriguez Jr. 1-yard run (Joey Slye kick), 9:33. Jets 27–21. **Drive: 9 plays, 77 yards, 4:37.**
- WAS – Antonio Gibson 2-yard run (Joey Slye kick), 4:52. Commanders 28–27. **Drive: 6 plays, 83 yards, 3:03.**
- NYJ – Greg Zuerlein 54-yard field goal, 0:05. Jets 30–28. **Drive: 8 plays, 31 yards, 1:36.**

**Top passers**

- WAS – Sam Howell – 6/22, 56 yards, TD, 2 INT
- NYJ – Trevor Siemian – 27/49, 217 yards, TD, INT

**Top rushers**

- WAS – Chris Rodriguez Jr. – 10 rushes, 58 yards, 2 TD
- NYJ – Breece Hall – 20 rushes, 95 yards, 2 TD

**Top receivers**

- WAS – Logan Thomas – 5 receptions, 36 yards, TD
- NYJ – Breece Hall – 12 receptions, 96 yards

==== Week 17: vs. San Francisco 49ers ====
Week 17: San Francisco 49ers at Washington Commanders – Game summary

Quarter	1	2	3	4	Total
**49ers**	10	3	7	7	**27**
Commanders	0	10	0	0	**10**

at FedExField, Landover, Maryland

- Date: December 31
- Game time: 1:00 p.m. EST
- Game weather: Cloudy, 48 °F (9 °C)
- Game attendance: 64,424
- Referee: Ronald Torbert
- TV announcers (Fox): Adam Amin, Mark Schlereth and Kristina Pink
- Recap, Game Book

Game information

**First quarter**

- SF — Jake Moody 38-yard field goal, 8:10. 49ers 3-0. **Drive: 12 plays, 50 yards, 6:54.**
- SF — Deebo Samuel 2-yard pass from Brock Purdy (Jake Moody kick), 1:35. 49ers 10-0. **Drive: 9 plays, 63 yards, 5:38.**

**Second quarter**

- WAS — Joey Slye 47-yard field goal, 12:10. 49ers 10-3. **9 plays, 46 yards, 4:26.**
- WAS — Terry McLaurin 3-yard pass from Sam Howell (Joey Slye kick), 4:37. Tied 10-10. **Drive: 9 plays, 79 yards, 5:18.**
- SF — Jake Moody 22-yard field goal, 0:22. 49ers 13-10. **Drive: 10 plays, 71 yards, 4:14.**

**Third quarter**

- SF — Elijah Mitchell 2-yard run (Jake Moody kick), 5:46. 49ers 20-10. **Drive: 12 plays, 68 yards, 7:15.**

**Fourth quarter**

- SF — Brandon Aiyuk 17-yard pass from Brock Purdy (Jake Moody kick), 9:30. 49ers 27-10. **Drive: 10 plays, 95 yards, 5:33.**

**Top passers**

- SF — Brock Purdy — 22/28, 230 yards, 2 TD
- WAS — Sam Howell — 17/28, 169 yards, TD, 2 INT

**Top rushers**

- SF — Elijah Mitchell — 17 rushes, 80 yards, TD
- WAS — Brian Robinson Jr. — 9 rushes, 44 yards

**Top receivers**

- SF — Brandon Aiyuk — 7 receptions, 114 yards, TD
- WAS — Terry McLaurin — 4 receptions, 61 yards, TD

==== Week 18: vs. Dallas Cowboys ====
Week 18: Dallas Cowboys at Washington Commanders – Game summary

Quarter	1	2	3	4	Total
**Cowboys**	7	14	14	3	**38**
Commanders	0	10	0	0	**10**

at FedExField, Landover, Maryland

- Date: January 7
- Game time: 4:25 p.m. EST
- Game weather: Cloudy, 48 °F (9 °C)
- Game attendance: 63,645
- Referee: Shawn Smith
- TV announcers (Fox): Kevin Burkhardt, Greg Olsen, Erin Andrews and Tom Rinaldi
- Recap, Game Book

Game information

**First quarter**

- DAL – Jalen Tolbert 3-yard pass from Dak Prescott (Brandon Aubrey kick), 6:26. Cowboys 7–0. **Drive: 8 plays, 67 yards, 3:47.**

**Second quarter**

- WAS – Brian Robinson Jr. 1-yard pass from Sam Howell (Joey Slye kick), 14:57. Tied 7–7. **Drive: 7 plays, 20 yards, 3:24.**
- WAS – Joey Slye 36-yard field goal, 7:04. Commanders 10–7. **Drive: 9 plays, 38 yards, 4:26.**
- DAL – Tony Pollard 1-yard run (Brandon Aubrey kick), 4:12. Cowboys 14–10. **Drive: 7 plays, 71 yards, 2:52.**
- DAL – CeeDee Lamb 4-yard pass from Dak Prescott (Brandon Aubrey kick), 0:23. Cowboys 21–10. **Drive: 6 plays, 65 yards, 1:17.**

**Third quarter**

- DAL – CeeDee Lamb 6-yard pass from Dak Prescott (Brandon Aubrey kick), 8:28. Cowboys 28–10. **Drive: 12 plays, 75 yards, 6:32.**
- DAL – Jalen Brooks 5-yard pass from Dak Prescott (Brandon Aubrey kick), 4:06. Cowboys 35–10. **Drive: 3 plays, 9 yards, 1:54.**

**Fourth quarter**

- DAL – Brandon Aubrey 50-yard field goal, 1:06. Cowboys 38–10. **Drive: 8 plays, 36 yards, 4:05.**

**Top passers**

- DAL – Dak Prescott – 31/36, 279 yards, 4 TD, INT
- WAS – Sam Howell – 19/27, 153 yards, TD, 2 INT

**Top rushers**

- DAL – Tony Pollard – 17 rushes, 70 yards, TD
- WAS – Brian Robinson Jr. – 9 rushes, 25 yards

**Top receivers**

- DAL – CeeDee Lamb – 13 receptions, 98 yards, 2 TD
- WAS – Terry McLaurin – 6 receptions, 56 yards

With the loss to the Dallas Cowboys, the commanders lost their 8th straight game in a row since beating the New England Patriots in Week 9.

=== Standings ===
==== Division ====
NFC East
	W	L	T	PCT	DIV	CONF	PF	PA	STK
^{(2)} Dallas Cowboys	12	5	0	.706	5–1	9–3	509	315	W2
^{(5)} Philadelphia Eagles	11	6	0	.647	4–2	7–5	433	428	L2
New York Giants	6	11	0	.353	3–3	5–7	266	407	W1
Washington Commanders	4	13	0	.235	0–6	2–10	329	518	L8

==== Conference ====
NFC
#	Team	Division	W	L	T	PCT	DIV	CONF	SOS	SOV	STK
**Division leaders**
1 (Note: San Francisco finished ahead of Dallas and Detroit based on conference record, claiming the No. 1 seed.)	San Francisco 49ers	West	12	5	0	.706	5–1	10–2	.509	.475	L1
2 (Note: Dallas claimed the No. 2 seed over Detroit based on head-to-head victory.)	Dallas Cowboys	East	12	5	0	.706	5–1	9–3	.446	.392	W2
3	Detroit Lions	North	12	5	0	.706	4–2	8–4	.481	.436	W1
4 (Note: Tampa Bay finished ahead of New Orleans in the NFC South based on common record. (Tampa Bay is 8–4 against Minnesota, Chicago, Detroit, Green Bay, Atlanta, Carolina, Houston, Tennessee, Jacksonville, and Indianapolis, while New Orleans is 6–6 against the same teams.))	Tampa Bay Buccaneers	South	9	8	0	.529	4–2	7–5	.481	.379	W1
**Wild cards**
5	Philadelphia Eagles	East	11	6	0	.647	4–2	7–5	.481	.476	L2
6	Los Angeles Rams	West	10	7	0	.588	5–1	8–4	.529	.453	W4
7 (Note: Green Bay and Seattle finished ahead of New Orleans based on conference record.) (Note: Green Bay finished ahead of Seattle based on strength of victory, claiming the 7th and final playoff spot.)	Green Bay Packers	North	9	8	0	.529	4–2	7–5	.474	.458	W3
**Did not qualify for the postseason**
8	Seattle Seahawks	West	9	8	0	.529	2–4	7–5	.512	.392	W1
9	New Orleans Saints	South	9	8	0	.529	4–2	6–6	.433	.340	W2
10 (Note: Minnesota finished ahead of Atlanta based on head-to-head victory. Division tie break was initially used to eliminate Chicago (see below).) (Note: Minnesota finished ahead of Chicago based on common record. (Minnesota is 5–7 against Tampa Bay, Los Angeles Chargers, Carolina, Kansas City, Green Bay, Atlanta, New Orleans, Denver, Las Vegas, and Detroit, while Chicago is 4–8 against the same teams.))	Minnesota Vikings	North	7	10	0	.412	2–4	6–6	.509	.454	L4
11 (Note: Chicago finished ahead of Atlanta based on head-to-head victory.)	Chicago Bears	North	7	10	0	.412	2–4	6–6	.464	.370	L1
12	Atlanta Falcons	South	7	10	0	.412	3–3	4–8	.429	.462	L2
13	New York Giants	East	6	11	0	.353	3–3	5–7	.512	.353	W1
14 (Note: Washington finished ahead of Arizona based on head-to-head victory.)	Washington Commanders	East	4	13	0	.235	0–6	2–10	.512	.338	L8
15	Arizona Cardinals	West	4	13	0	.235	0–6	3–9	.561	.588	L1
16	Carolina Panthers	South	2	15	0	.118	1–5	1–11	.522	.500	L3
**Tiebreakers** (Note: When breaking ties for three or more teams under the NFL's rules, they are first broken within divisions, then comparing only the highest-ranked remaining team from each division.)
