= PRY =

PRY may refer to:

- Paraguay
- Perry Barr railway station, England; National Rail station code PRY
- IATA, code for Wonderboom Airport in Pretoria, South Africa
- Pry (software), Read, Evaluate, and Print Ruby code
- Polycystin-related Y protein (PRY), found within the Y chromosome

== See also ==
- Pry (disambiguation)
