= World Health Summit =

International conference

- World Health Summit logo.
- Date: October
- Begins: 2009; 17 years ago
- Frequency: annual
- Locations: Berlin and online
- Next event: World Health Summit 2025: October 12–15
- Attendance: 3,000 (in Person), 20,000 (online)
- Area: international
- Patrons: Chancellor of Germany, President of France, Director-General of the World Health Organization (WHO)
- Website: http://www.worldhealthsummit.org/

The World Health Summit (WHS) is an international strategic forum for global health that convenes stakeholders from science, business, politics, and civil society to discuss key challenges in global healthcare.

In addition to the conference in Berlin, the World Health Summit features annual WHS Regional Meetings held in different parts of the world as well as activities throughout the year such as the WHS Global Health Dialogues, which aim to foster exchange among decision-makers and thought leaders in smaller settings.

The World Health Summit’s academic basis is the WHS Academic Alliance, a network of academic health centers, universities and national academies that organizes the WHS Regional Meetings and international initiatives in the global health sector.

== History ==
The founders recognized that whilst similar gatherings of leaders were well established in fields such as economic development and technology, a global forum did not exist for medical practice, research and health care systems.

The initiative for the summit came from Detlev Ganten, former CEO of Charité - Universitätsmedizin Berlin, with the aim of bringing together political decision-makers, with scientists and healthcare experts to jointly develop strategies for sustainable healthcare on a scientific and medical background. The first conference took place in October 2009 on the occasion of the 300th anniversary of the Charité – Universitätsmedizin Berlin under the theme “The Evolution of Medicine” and attracted approximately 700 participants to Berlin.

The summit was established under the patronage of the German chancellor, Angela Merkel, and the President of the French Republic, Nicolas Sarkozy. The patronage by the German Chancellor was continued by Olaf Scholz as well as that of the French President by Francois Hollande, and by Emmanuel Macron. They were joined in 2013 by José Manuel Barroso, President of the European Commission. Jean-Claude Juncker and Ursula von der Leyen continued this patronage until 2021. Since 2019, the World Health Organization's (WHO) Director-General Tedros Adhanom joined as patron.

In 2022, the World Health Summit was co-hosted with the World Health Organization (WHO), bringing together a wide range of high-level global health stakeholders. Key topics included “Climate Change and Health”, “Pandemic Preparedness”, “Food Security”, “Digital Transformation”, “Sustainable Health Systems”, and “The Role of Germany, the G7 and G20 in Global Health.” The event featured 60 sessions with 400 speakers and attracted 4,000 participants on site and 60,000 online from 140 nations.

=== Impact ===
The World Health Summit has been the platform for a number of major global health initiatives and funding commitments to international organizations and programs. In 2024, a WHO Investment Round event at the World Health Summit secured $700 million for global health, with an additional $300 million pledged in advance by the European Union and the African Union. These funds are intended to help prevent 40 million avoidable deaths within four years. In 2023, a donor event for the Global Financing Facility raised $250 million to support the “Deliver the Future” campaign, which aims to provide essential healthcare to women, children, and adolescents in hard-to-reach communities. In 2022, $2.6 billion were pledged towards the Global Polio Eradication Initiative.

=== List of all World Health Summits ===
Year	Participants	Central Topics	Co-Presidents
2026 (April 27–29)	2,000+ participants from over 50 countries	Pandemic Preparedness and Health Security in Africa Climate Change, Environment, and Health Systems Resilience Digital Health, AI, and Technological Innovation Health Workforce, Financing, and System Building Gender Equity, Youth Leadership, and Social Accountability Mental Health, Psychosocial Support, and Well-being Primary Healthcare, UHC, and Social Determinants of Health Women, Adolescents, Child Health and Nutrition	Prof. Lukoye Atwoli, Dean of the Medical College, East Africa, at Aga Khan University
2025 (October 12–14)		Reducing the Burden of NCDs: Prevention, Collaboration & Care, Artificial Intelligence: From Data to Decisions for Global Health Systems, Transforming Global Health Architecture: Rethinking Governance & Financing Models, Peace and Health: Building Bridges for Global Stability and Well-being, Climate in Crisis, Health at Risk: Equitable Strategies for a Resilient World, Women’s and Children’s Health: Transforming Policy into Practice	Balvir S. Tomar, NIMS University(International President 2025), Axel R. Pries, Charité, World Health Summit President)
2024 (October 13–15)	3,500 on site 21,000 digitally	From Pledges to Progress: Financing Global Health Solutions, Antimicrobial Resistance: Roadmap to Future Resilience, Empowering Futures: Strategies for Women's and Children's Health, The Climate-Health Nexus: Pathways to Action for Equity, Fostering Youth Leadership: Strengthening Voices for Impact, Artificial Intelligence: A New Era in Digital Health	Sophia Zoungas, Monash University(International President 2024), Christina Mitchel, Monash University (International President 2024), Axel R. Pries, Charité, World Health Summit President)
2023 (October 15–17)	3,100 on site 12,000 digitally	Learning from COVID-19 for Future Pandemic Prevention, Preparedness and Response, Recommitting to Universal Health Coverage, Sustainable Health for People and Planet, G7/G20 Measures to Enhance Global Health Equity and Security, Harnessing the Power of Digital Technologies for Global Health, World Health Organization’s 75th Anniversary, Innovations to Accelerate the Fight Against Tuberculosis, Global Financing Facility (GFF) Pledging Event	Adnan Hyder, George Washington University(International President 2023), Axel R. Pries, Charité (World Health Summit President)
2022 (October 16–18)	4,000 on site 60,000 digitally	Investment for Health and Well-Being, Climate Change and Planetary Health, Architecture for Pandemic Preparedness, Digital Transformation for Health, Food Systems for Health, Health Systems Resilience and Equity, Global Health for Peace	Tedros Adhanom Ghebreyesus, WHO (Co-Host 2022), Axel R. Pries (World Health Summit President)
2021 (October 24–26)	6,000 on site and digitally	Vaccine Equity: A Call to Action, The Role of the European Union in Global Health, WHO Council on the Economics of Health for All, The Intersection of COVID-19 and Mental Health, Unlocking Digital and AI Technologies for Health, Pandemic Preparedness: Lessons from COVID-19, Policy Track – Hosted by the Federal Ministry of Health	Charles Ibingira, Makerere University College of Health Sciences(International President 2021), Axel R. Pries, Charité (World Health Summit President)
2020 (October 25–27)	Digital only, 6,000 participants	Pandemic Preparedness in the Age of COVID-19: Global Cooperation not Competition, Strengthening the Role of the European Union in Global Health, Climate Change and Health: Risks and Responses, Partnership for the Goals: United Nations’ 75th Anniversary, Accelerating the SDG3 Global Action Plan for Health and Well-Being, Translational Research: Advancing Innovative Treatments, Digital Health & AI for Pandemic Preparedness	Charles Ibingira, Makerere University College of Health Sciences (International President 2020), Detlev Ganten (World Health Summit Founding President)
2019 (October 27–29)	2.500 on site	Climate Change and Health, Transforming Human Capital: Investing in Health and Education, Universal Health Coverage: Expanding Rights and Access, Health is a Political Choice: The Future of Health Policy in the G7/G20 and other Political Venues, SDG 3: The Global Action Plan for Healthy Lives and Well-Being for All, Focus Africa: Building Capacities and Strong Institutions, Digital Health: Shaping Society and the Modern Economy	Ali Jafarian, Tehran University of Medical Sciences(International President 2019), Detlev Ganten, Charité (World Health Summit Founding President)
2018 (October 14–16)	2,400 on site	Pandemic Preparedness, The Sustainable Development Goals: Health in All Policies, Access to Essential Medicines, Health Systems Strengthening, Antimicrobial Resistance, The Digital Healthcare Revolution	João Gabriel Silva, University of Coimbra, Fernando Regateiro, Coimbra University Hospitals(International Presidents 2018), Detlev Ganten, Charité (World Health Summit Founding President)
2017 (October 15–17)	2,000 on site	Health Policy in the G7/G20: The Future of Global Health Governance, Global Health Security: Policy Responses to Planetary Challenges, Healthy and Resilient Cities: Rethinking Urban Transformation, Vaccine Research and Development: Challenges and Opportunities, Strengthening Innovation and Health Systems in Africa, Big Data for Health Governance: Benefits, Frameworks and Ethics	Hélène Boisjoly, University of Montreal(International President 2017), Detlev Ganten, Charité (World Health Summit Founding President)
2016 (October 9–11)	1,600 on site	Migration and Refugee Health: From Care to Policy, Technological Innovation for Health: Improving Healthcare Delivery, Women, Empowerment and Health: Equality and Agency, Translational Research: Advancing Innovative Treatment, Infectious Diseases: Lessons Learned from Ebola to Zika, Sustainable Development Goals: Transforming the Health Agenda	Antoine Flahault, Institute of Global Health (International President 2016), Detlev Ganten, Charité (World Health Summit Founding President)
2015 (October 11–13)	1,500 on site	Education and Leadership, Research and Innovation, Evidence to Policy, Global Health for Development	Shunichi Fukuhara, Kyoto University(International President 2015), Detlev Ganten, Charité (World Health Summit Founding President)
2014 (October 19–22)	1,300 on site	Education and Leadership, Research and Innovation, Evidence to Policy, Global Health for Development	José Otávio Auler Jr., University of São Paulo(International President 2014), Detlev Ganten, Charité (World Health Summit Founding President)
2013 (October 20–22)	1,200 on site	Research and Innovation, Education and Leadership for Health, Evidence to Policy, Global Health for Development	John Eu-Li Wong, National University of Singapore(International President 2013), Detlev Ganten, Charité (World Health Summit Founding President)
2012 (October 21–24)	1,200 on site	Diseases of Modern Environments, Translation Research into Policy, Health and Economy, Educating Health Professionals, Information Technology for Health	Michael J. Klag, Johns Hopkins University(International President 2012), Detlev Ganten, Charité (World Health Summit Founding President)
2011 (October 23–26)	1,200 on site	Today’s Science, Research and Innovation, Strengthening Health Systems, Tomorrow’s Agenda	Steve Wesselingh, Monash University (International President 2011), Detlev Ganten, Charité (World Health Summit Founding President)
2010 (October 10–13)	1,200 on site	Translation, Transition, Transformation	Stephen K. Smith, Imperial College(International President 2010), Detlev Ganten, Charité (World Health Summit Founding President)
2009 (October 14–18)	700 on site	Infectious Diseases, Health Care Across the Generations, Health Systems, Adapting the Research Agenda	Axel Kahn; Université Paris Descartes, Detlev Ganten, Charité (World Health Summit Founding President)

== International network and activities ==
The World Health Summit understands itself as an international strategic platform for global health. It holds close ties with international initiatives and organizations, facilitating year-round cooperation in projects and exchange programs over various world regions.

=== WHS Academic Alliance ===
The WHS Academic Alliance (formerly M8 Alliance) is an academic network of institutions of education and research, including national academies. It was officially inaugurated in 2009 on occasion of the first World Health Summit.

The WHS Academic Alliance consists of around 30 member institutions worldwide (as of June 2025), including the InterAcademy Partnership, which represents national academies of medicine and sciences in over 100 countries. According to the WHS Academic Alliance goals, the network seeks to improve global health and works with political and economic decision-makers and civil society to develop science-based solutions for health challenges worldwide. It was established as a permanent platform for framing future considerations of global medical developments and health challenges.

A key role of the WHS Academic Alliance is to contribute to each World Health Summit by participating in the definition of topics, and the development of the program and organizing the WHS Regional Meetings. The International Presidency of the World Health Summit rotates annually among its members. The Alliance also publishes joint declarations and organizes events such as expert meetings in different regions of the world. The secretariat of the WHS Academic Alliance is hosted by the World Health Summit in Berlin, Germany.

==== Members of the WHS Academic Alliance (as of June 2025) ====
- Africa Academy for Public Health, Tanzania
- Aga Khan University, Pakistan and East Africa
- American University of Beirut, Libanon
- Ashoka University, India
- Association of Academic Health Centers International (AAHCI)
- Charité – Universitätsmedizin Berlin, Germany
- Chinese Academy of Medical Sciences and Peking Union Medical College, China
- Coimbra Health, University of Coimbra, Portugal
- Consortium of Universities for Global Health (CUGH)
- Global Network for Academic Public Health (GNAPH)
- Institut de Recherches Cliniques de Montréal, Canada
- InterAcademy Partnership (IAP)
- Istanbul University, Turkey
- Karolinska Institute, Sweden
- Li Ka Shing Faculty of Medicine, The University of Hong Kong (HKUMed), China
- London School of Hygiene and Tropical Medicine, UK
- Makerere University, Uganda
- Manipal Academy of Higher Education (MAHE), India
- Milken Institute School of Public Health at George Washington University, USA
- Monash University, Australia
- National Taiwan University, Taiwan
- National University of Singapore (Yong Loo Lin School of Medicine)
- NIMS University, India
- Sapienza University of Rome, Italy
- Sergio Arouca National School of Public Health, ENSP, Brazil
- Tehran University of Medical Sciences, Iran
- Trinity College Dublin, Ireland
- Université Paris Cité, France
- University of Montreal, Canada

=== WHS Regional Meetings ===
Each year in addition to the main conference in Berlin, a member of the WHS Academic Alliance hosts the WHS Regional Meeting. Convened in the countries of the respective member, these meetings focus on regional topics and challenges related to global and public health and complement the discussions of the main summit.

The WHS Regional Meetings are organized by the institution that holds the rotating presidency of the WHS Academic Alliance in the respective year. They evolved from the international planning meetings traditionally held in April with the alliance members.

Year	Host Institution	Country	Themes	International President(s)
2026 (April 27–29)	Aga Khan University East Africa	Kenya(Nairobi)	Reimagining Africa’s Health Systems Innovation, Integration and Interdependence	Lukoye Atwoli, Professor and Dean, Medical College East Africa, The Aga Khan University, Kenya
2025 (April 25–27)	NIMS University und Manipal Academy of Higher Education, Ashoka University	India (New Delhi)	India (New Delhi)	Balvir S. Tomar, NIMS University
2024 (April 22–24)	Monash University	Australia (Melbourne)	“Shape the Future of Health across Asia and the Pacific“	Christina Mitchell and Sophia Zoungas, Monash University
2023 (April 13)	George Washington University Milken School of Public Health und Association of Academic Health Centers	USA (Washington, D.C.)	“Bridging the Science to Policy Gap for Global Health“	Adnan Hyder, George Washington University
2022 (June 15–17)	Sapienza University of Rome	Italy (Rome)	“Vaccine Development and Policies: Challenges and Strategies“, “Healthcare Systems“, “Metabolic Syndrome and Chronic Diseases“, “New Technologies and Personalized Therapies“, “New Frontiers in Healthcare Promotion“	Eugenio Gaudio and Luciano Saso, Sapienza University of Rome
2021 (June 27–30)	Makerere University	Uganda (Kampala)	“The Health of the African Youth, Advancing Technology for Health in Africa“, “Infectious Diseases and Global Health Security“, “Stemming the Tide of Non-Communicable Diseases in Low- and Middle-Income Countries“, “Inter-Sectoral Action for Health“	Charles Ibingira, Makerere University College of Health Sciences
2020 (postponed to 2021 due to COVID-19)				
2019 (April 29–30)	Teheran University of Medical Sciences	Iran (Kish)	“United together for global health“	Ali Jafarian, Teheran University of Medical Sciences
2018 (April 19–20)	University of Coimbra, Coimbra University Hospital	Portugal (Coimbra)	“Managing Infectious Diseases“, “Governance for Health Equity in Low & Middle Income Countries“, “Opportunities and Challenges in Translating Innovation into Healthcare“, “Biomedical Education for a Changing World“	João Gabriel Silva, University of Coimbra
2017 (May 8–9)	Universität Montreal, Montreal Clinical Research Institute	Canada (Montreal)	“New Frontiers in Medical Treatment“, “Health and Healthcare Delivery for Specific Groups“, “Environmental, Social and Cultural Determinants of Health“, “Medical Education for Optimal Healthcare“	Hélène Boisjoly, Faculty of Medicine, University of Montreal
2016 (April 19–21)	University of Geneva, Geneva University Hospitals	Switzerland(Geneva)	“Global Health: Sustainable and Affordable Innovation in Healthcare”	Antoine Flahault, Institute of Global Health, University of Geneva
2015 (April 13–14)	Kyoto University	Japan (Kyoto)	“Challenges in a Rapidly Aging Society“, “Preparedness for & Resilience after Disasters“, “Fostering New Leadership“	Shunichi Fukuhara, School of Public Health, Kyoto University
2014 (April 6–8)	University of São Paulo	Brazil (São Paulo)	“Healthy Life Expectancy“, “Urban Health / Health in Megacities“, “Increased Research Capacity to Incorporate Technologies“, “Management of Health Systems to Ensure Universal Coverage“, “Health Education“	José Otávio Costa Auler Jr., Faculty of Medicine, University of São Paulo
2013 (April 8–10)	National University of Singapore	Singapore	“The Impact of Health on Asian Economies“. Innovations in Health in Asia“, “Financing Health Care in Asia“, “Emerging Health Threats in Asia“	John Eu-Li Wong, National University of Singapore

== Leadership ==
Since 2021, Axel Radlach Pries, former dean of Charité - Universitätsmedizin Berlin is serving as World Health Summit President. The World Health Summit was founded by Detlev Ganten, a career medical research scientist and Chairman of the Board of the Charité Foundation, who held his role as World Health Summit President from 2009 to 2020.

In addition to Axel Pries' role as President, each year the International Presidency rotates amongst the members of the WHS Academic Alliance. The alliance is a key contributor to the World Health Summit's themes and programs.

The International Co-President of the World Health Summit 2025 from 12 to 14 October in Berlin, was Balvir S. Tomar from NIMS University in India. He handed over the mantle to Prof. Lukoye Atwoli, Dean of The Aga Khan University, Kenya and President of the WHS Regional Meeting 2026.

The WHS Foundation GmbH, a wholly owned subsidiary of Charité – Universitätsmedizin Berlin, is responsible for the organization and administration of the World Health Summit. Since 2023, Carsten Schicker has beenCEO of the WHS Foundation GmbH.

== Criticism and reactions ==
The World Health Summit has been criticized by Thomas Gebauer, Director of Medico International, as an "elitist club of decision makers", that ignores both the social factor of global health issues and the notion of health as a human right, but rather serves particular interests. Thus, in 2009, this Frankfurt-based organization initiated an alternative conference as a form of protest against the World Health Summit.

In subsequent years, the World Health Summit has provided information on the composition of its funding. According to the organization, approximately 40% of its budget is covered by public funding, 40% by private sector contributions, and 20% by academic institutions, private foundations, and participant fees. No single private partner contributes more than 4% of the total budget.

The World Health Summit has also introduced measures to facilitate participation from low- and middle-income countries. These include free livestreams of sessions, a scholarship program to support participation, and an increased focus on topics relevant to global health equity and the Global South.
