= Preyer =

Preyer is a surname. Notable people with this surname include:

- Abraham Preyer (1862–1927), Dutch art dealer and collector
- Carl Adolph Preyer (1863–1947), German-American pianist, composer, and teacher
- Gottfried von Preyer (1807–1901), Austrian composer, conductor, and teacher
- Johann Wilhelm Preyer (1803–1889), German still life painter
- L. Richardson Preyer (1919–2001), American jurist and politician
- William Thierry Preyer (1841–1897), English-born physiologist who worked in Germany

== See also ==
- Prior (surname)
- Pryor
- Pryer
