= Detlev Ganten =

German pharmacologist

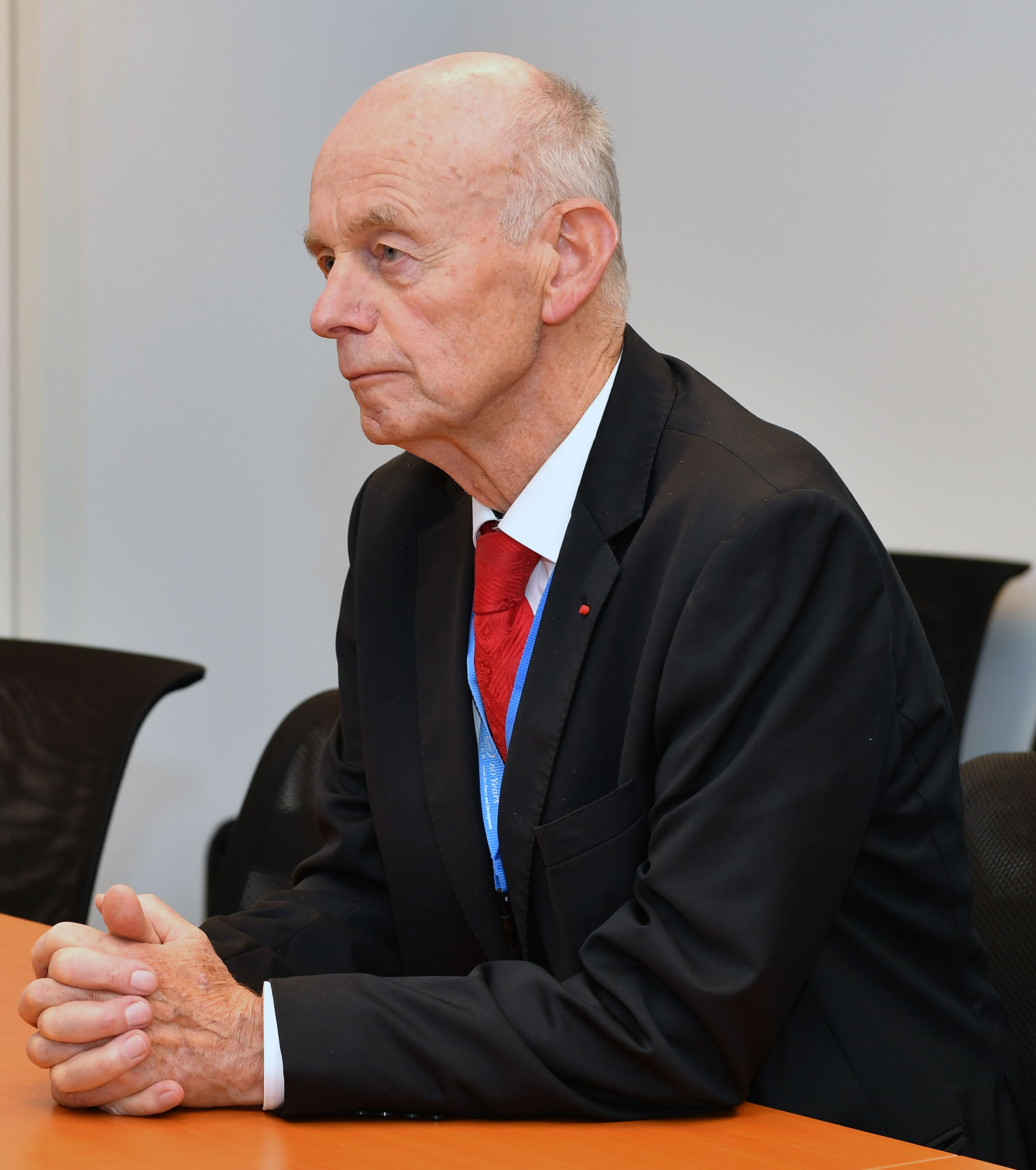
- Ganten in 2007
- Born: March 28, 1941 (age 85); Lüneburg, Nether saxony, Germany
- Occupations: Specialist in pharmacology and molecular medicine

Detlev Ganten (born 1941) is a specialist in pharmacology and molecular medicine and is one of the leading scientists in the field of hypertension. He founded the World Health Summit in 2009. He was Chairman of the Foundation Board of the Charité Foundation (2005–2015), editor of the Journal of Molecular Medicine (since 1993), Chairman of the Board of Trustees of the Max Planck Institute of Colloids and Interfaces and Max Planck Institute of Molecular Plant Physiology as well as Chairman of the Board of Trustees of the Ethnological Museum Dahlem of the Prussian Cultural Heritage Foundation.

From 2004 to 2008, he was CEO of the Charité – Universitätsmedizin Berlin. and from 1991 to 2004 Founding Director and CEO of the Max Delbrück Center for Molecular Medicine in the Helmholtz Association.

== Academic and professional career ==
Ganten was born in Lüneburg. He completed agricultural training in Elmshorn in 1959 with the agricultural assistant state examination. Following his secondary education he studied medicine in Würzburg and Montpellier from 1962 to 1964 and worked in the surgical ward of the hospital "La Mamounia" in Marrakesh. From 1966 to 1968 he continued his medical studies in Tübingen, concluding them with the medical state examination and subsequent internships in Tübingen and Emden. In 1968 Ganten received his MD from the University of Tübingen followed by a research period (1969 to 1973) at the Clinical Research Institute in Montreal affiliated with the University of Montreal. In 1970 he received his license to practice medicine and then in 1973, obtained the degree of Doctor of Philosophy (PhD) from McGill University in Montreal.

From 1973 to 1991 Ganten worked for the Pharmacological Institute of the University of Heidelberg where he also qualified as a professor in 1974. In 1975 he received a professorship in Pharmacology at the Medical Faculty of Heidelberg University. In 1978 he became specialist in Pharmacology and Clinical Pharmacology.

On 1 January 1992, Ganten was appointed Founding Director of the Max Delbrück Center for Molecular Medicine (MDC) in Berlin-Buch. His task was to transform the central institutions for cardiovascular research, cancer research and molecular biology of the Academy of Sciences of the GDR into a new national center for health research of the Helmholtz Association of German Research Centres. Around the same time (1993) he was offered the chair for Clinical Pharmacology at the Free University of Berlin. In this period he promoted clinical translational research from basic research to clinical application, intensifying the cooperation in the field of basic research at the MDC with the hospitals in Berlin-Buch, the hospitals of the Medical Faculties of the Free University in Berlin-Steglitz (Klinikum Benjamin Franklin) and Wedding (Virchow-Klinikum) and the Medical Faculty of the Humboldt University (Charité Campus Mitte).

In 2004, the Senate of Berlin appointed Ganten CEO of the Charité – Universitätsmedizin Berlin. Under his direction the locations of academic medicine in East and West Berlin were united. As a result of the merger with the "Universitätsklinikum Benjamin Franklin" of the Free University of Berlin, the Charité Berlin became a member of both universities and thus the largest university hospital in Germany. Ganten held the office of CEO of the Charité – Universitätsmedizin until 2008.

The year 2005 saw the establishment of the Charité Foundation by donor Johanna Quandt and Ganten. Since then, Ganten has been acting Chairman of the Foundation Board. Support from the Charité Foundation helped to establish an increasingly closer association between the Charité – Universitätsmedizin and the Max Delbrück Center in Berlin-Buch. The formation of the "Berlin Institute of Health (BIH)" was founded in 2013 through an agreement of the Federal Ministry for Research and Technology and the Senate of Berlin. The BIH provides a joint structure and platform for MDC and Charité to strengthen their clinical research initiatives.

On occasion of the 300th anniversary of the founding of the Charité in 2009, Ganten launched the World Health Summit, one of the world’s leading strategic forums for global health taking place annually in Berlin. He held the position of World Health Summit President from 2009 until 2020.

In 2013 Ganten was elected co-chair of the Interacademy Medical Panel (IAMP).

== Fields of research ==
Ganten's major area of research is hypertension. He discovered basic mechanisms underlying the development of hypertension and is investigating the hormonal regulation of hypertension, in particular the renin-angiotensin-aldosteron system. Further key research interests include the genomic and molecular mechanisms of evolution and evolutionary medicine, concepts for the prevention of cardiovascular diseases, Public Health, Global Health and Bioethics. Ganten is also an editor of the Journal of Molecular Medicine (since 1993).

Ganten has been president and coordinator of numerous scientific conferences, among them: Scientific Meeting of the European and International Societies of Hypertension (Heidelberg 1986, Berlin 2008); Gordon Conference (1997, Italy); and the Annual Meeting of the Society of German Natural Scientists and Physicians (Gesellschaft Deutscher Naturforscher und Ärzte, GDNÄ – Berlin 1998).

== Functions in scientific societies and committees ==
Ganten's functions in scientific societies and committees include: membership in the Berlin-Brandenburg Academy of Sciences and Humanities (BBAW); the Heidelberg Academy of Sciences and Humanities, the Academy of Sciences Leopoldina; the Academia Europaea, the Polish Academy of Sciences; and the Académie de Berlin. Further memberships include the Health Research Council of the German Federal Ministry for Science and Technology from 1992 to 1997 and the Science Council of the German Federal Government from 1993 to 1998.

Ganten was President of the Helmholtz Association of National Research Centers (1997–2001); and a member of the German Ethics Council from 2001 to 2007.

From 1995 to 2004 Ganten was acting Vice President of the Berlin–Brandenburg Academy of Sciences (BBAW).

== Other activities ==
- Agence nationale de la recherche (ANR), Member of the Advisory Board (since 2009)
- Max Planck Institute for Molecular Genetics, Member of the Board of Trustees
- Max Planck Institute of Molecular Plant Physiology, Member of the Board of Trustees
- Robert Koch Foundation, Member of the Board of Trustees
- Sorbonne Paris Cité University, Member of the Scientific Advisory Board
- Vanke School of Public Health at Tsinghua University, Member of the International Advisory Board
- Collège de France, President of the Comité International d’Orientation Scientifique et Stratégique (2004–2012)
- Institut de la Santé et de Recherche Médicale (INSERM), Member of Board of Directors (2001–2009)
- Society of German Natural Scientists and Physicians, President (1996–1998)
- World Hypertension League (WHL), President (1992–1998)

== Recognition ==
Ganten received the Order of Merit of the State of Berlin in 1997; the Federal Cross of Merit, Germany in 2000, and in 2012, the insignia of Officer of the Legion of Honor of the French Republic

Ganten was appointed Dr. honoris causa by:

- Wuhan University, China (1994)
- Alexandru Ioan Cuza University, Romania (1995)
- First Moscow State University (2004)
- Coimbra, Portugal (2015)
- Maastricht University, Netherlands (2015)
- Charité - Universitätsmedizin Berlin, Germany (2016)
- Montreal University, Canada (2017)
- Sapienza University of Rome, Italy (2017)
- Istanbul University, Turkey (2018)

Ganten has been the recipient of many international awards and prizes including the Chavez Award of the International Society of Hypertension; Sechenev Medal of the Medical Academy Moscow; Franz Gross Science Award of the German League for Combating High Blood Pressure (all in 1981 respectively); the Heilmeyer Medal of the Society for Progress in Internal Medicine (1990); the Max Planck Research Award (with Kazuo Murakami, Japan) (1991); the Okamoto Award, Japan (1991); the CIBA Award of the Council for High Blood Pressure Research of the American Heart Association (1992); and in 2013, the Humboldt Medal of the Society of German Natural Scientists and Physicians.

== Books ==
- Ganten, D., Deichmann, T. and Spahl, T. Leben, Natur, Wissenschaft – Alles, was man wissen muss. Eichborn AG, Frankfurt am Main. 2003.
- Ganten, D., Gerhardt, V., Nida-Rümelin, J. Funktionen des Bewusstseins. Walter de Gruyter, Berlin. 2008.
- Ganten, D., Gerhardt, V., Heilinger, J., Nida-Rümelin, J. Was ist der Mensch? Walter de Gruyter, Berlin. 2008.
- Ganten, D., Spahl, Th., Deichmann, Th. Die Steinzeit steckt uns in den Knochen – Gesundheit als Erbe der Evolution. Pieper, München. 2009.
- Ganten, D., Niehaus, J., Die Gesundheitsformel: Die großen Zivilisationskrankheiten verstehen und verhindern. Knaus Verlag, München, 2014.
