= Prior (surname) =

Prior is a surname. Notable people with the surname include:

- Alex Prior (born 1992), Russian child prodigy composer
- Alfredo Prior (1952–2024), Argentine painter, writer, performer, and musician
- Anthony Prior (born 1970), American football player
- Arthur Prior (1914–1969), philosopher and logician
- David Prior (disambiguation), multiple people
- Edward Gawler Prior (1853–1920), Canadian politician and 15th Premier of British Columbia
- G. Cosens Prior (1855–1937), English solicitor and social reformer
- George Thurland Prior (1862–1936), British mineralogist
- Hans Peter Prior (1866–1936), Danish industrialist
- Jim Prior (James Prior, Baron Prior) (1927–2016), British politician
- John Prior (musician) (born 1960), Australian musician
- Maddy Prior (born 1947), English singer
- Margaret Prior (1773–1842), American humanitarian, missionary, moral reform worker, writer
- Marina Prior (born 1963), Australian singer and actress
- Mark Prior (born 1980), baseball pitcher
- Mary Prior (born 1942), British Lord–Lieutenant for Bristol
- Matt Prior (born 1982), English cricketer
- Matthew Prior (1664–1721), English poet
- Redvers Prior (1893–1964), British politician and Royal Navy officer
- Richard Chandler Alexander Prior (1892–1902), English physician and botanist
- Sharron Prior (died 1975), Canadian murder victim
- Spencer Prior (born 1971), English footballer
- William J. Prior (1946–2026), American philosopher and academic

== See also ==
- Preyer
- Pryor (disambiguation)
