= Prior =

The term prior may refer to:

- Prior (ecclesiastical), the head of a priory (monastery)
- Prior convictions, the life history and previous convictions of a suspect or defendant in a criminal case
- Prior probability, in Bayesian statistics
- Prior knowledge for pattern recognition
- Saint Prior (4th century), an Egyptian hermit and disciple of Anthony the Great
- Prior (surname)
- Prior (Stargate), a fictional race in the television series Stargate
- Prior (brand), a Norwegian brand of eggs and white meat
- Prior, Missouri, a community in the United States
- Prior Norge, a defunct Norwegian egg and white meat processing cooperative

== See also ==
- A priori and a posteriori, two kinds of logical inference
