= Axel Radlach Pries =

Physiology professor

Axel Radlach Pries is a German professor of physiology and, since 2015, Dean of the board of Charité hospital in Berlin, Germany and President of the World Health Summit. He is married to the photographer Gina Elisabeth Pries.

== Education and professional career ==
In 1979 Pries passed his medical examination at the University of Cologne in Germany. In the following year, he received his doctoral degree summa cum laude. Until 1983, he worked as a Postdoctoral Fellow at the University of Cologne and then moved to the Institute of Physiology of the Freie Universität Berlin. In 1990, Pries finished his habilitation and became associate professor in 1995. From 1997 to 1998 Axel Pries was employed as Senior Physician for Anaesthesiology at the German Heart Center Berlin (DHZB). In 1998 he became a Full professor at the Institute for Physiology of the Freie Universität Berlin and from 2001 to 2015 Head of the Institute for Physiology of the Charité-Universitätsmedizin Berlin.

From 1996 to 2011 Pries was General Secretary of the German Society for Microcirculation and vascular biology, and General Secretary for the European Society for Microcirculation from 1998 to 2011. From 2006 to 2015 he was chair of the International Liaison Committee for Microcirculation (ILCM). He took various leading roles in the European Society of Cardiology: from 1998 to 2000 he was the Chairman of the Working Group on Coronary Pathophysiology and Microcirculation, from 2005 to 2010 and later from 2012 to 2014 he was a Basic Science Coordinator in the Congress Programme Committee. From 2010 to 2012 he was the Chairman of the Council on Basic Cardiovascular Science. He was Chairman of the International Liaison Committee for Microcirculation from 2006 to 2015. From 2016 to 2021, he was a member of the Board of the Biomedical Alliance in Europe, the association of leading biomedical societies in Europe and its president from 2018 to 2019.

From 2015 to 2022 he was Dean and member of the board of Charité hospital in Berlin, from 2018 to 2020 he led the Berlin Institute of Health (BIH) as interim CEO, and 2021 he became president of the World Health Summit. In 2023 he was appointed as Prorector for Medicine at the Danube Private University.

In the negotiations to form a coalition government between the Christian Democratic Union (CDU) and the Social Democratic Party (SPD) under the leadership of Kai Wegner following Berlin’s 2023 state elections, Pries was part of the CDU’s delegation to the working group on science policy and universities.

== Honors, Awards and Fellowships ==
1980 Thesis Award “Hochhausstiftung”, University of Cologne

1986 Abbott Microcirculation Award, European Society for Microcirculation

1995 Lafon Hemorheology-Microcirculation Award, International Society for Clinical Haemorheology

2000 Fellow, European Society of Cardiology

2008 Award of the Asian Union for Microcirculation

2011 Malpighi Award, European Society for Microcirculation

2015 William Harvey Basic Science Lecture and silver medal, European Society of Cardiology

2015 Kitanomaru Award, 10th World Conf. for Microcirculation, Kyoto, Japan

2018 Poiseuille Gold Medal, International Society of Biorheology

== Publications ==
- Coalescent angiogenesis- evidence for a novel concept of vascular network maturation. Nitzsche B, Rong WW, Goede A, Hoffmann B, Scarpa F, Kuebler WM, Secomb TW, Pries AR. Angiogenesis. 2022 Feb;25(1):35-45.
- Coronary microcirculatory pathophysiology: can we afford it to remain a black box? Pries AR and Reglin B. European Heart Journal 2017 Feb 14;38(7):478-488.
- Coronary vascular regulation, remodelling, and collateralization: mechanisms and clinical implications on behalf of the working group on coronary pathophysiology and microcirculation. Pries AR, et al. European Heart Journal 2015; 36(45): 3134–3146.
- Making microvascular networks work: angiogenesis, remodeling, and pruning. Pries AR and Secomb TW. Physiology 2014; 29(6): 446–455.
- Metabolic control of microvascular networks: oxygen sensing and beyond. Reglin B and Pries AR. J Vasc Res 2014; 51(5): 376–392.
- Presentation, management, and outcomes of ischaemic heart disease in women. Vaccarino V, Badimon L, Corti R, de Wit C, Dorobantu M, Manfrini O, Koller A, Pries A, Cenko E, Bugiardini R. Nature Rev Cardiol 2013; 10(9): 508–518.
- Angiogenesis: an adaptive dynamic biological patterning problem. Secomb TW, Alberding JP, Hsu R, Dewhirst MW, Pries AR. PLoS Comput Biol 2013; 9(3): e1002983.
- Precapillary oxygenation contributes relevantly to gas exchange in the intact lung. Tabuchi A, Styp-Rekowska B, Slutsky AS, Wagner PD, Pries AR*, Kuebler WM* (*these authors share senior authorship). Am J Respir Crit Care Med 2013; 188(4): 474–481.
- Excessive erythrocytosis compromises the blood-endothelium interface in erythropoietin-overexpressing mice. Richter V, Savery MD, Gassmann M, Baum O, Damiano ER, Pries AR. J Physiol 2011; 589(21): 5181–5192.
- Pulsatile shear and Gja5 modulate arterial identity and remodeling events during flow-driven arteriogenesis. Buschmann I*, Pries A*, Styp-Rekowska B et al. (*these authors contributed equally). Development 2010; 137(13): 2187–2196.
- The shunt problem: control of functional shunting in normal and tumour vasculature. Pries AR, Hopfner M, Le Noble F, Dewhirst MW, Secomb TW. Nature Rev Cancer 2010; 10(8): 587–593.
- Origins of heterogeneity in tissue perfusion and metabolism. Pries AR and Secomb TW. Cardiovasc Res 2009; 81(2): 328–335.
- Blood flow in microvascular networks. Pries AR and Secomb TW. In: Handbook of Physiology: Microcirculation, edited by Tuma RF, Durán WN and Ley K., Elsevier, 2008, Chap 1, 3-36.
- Remodeling of blood vessels: responses of diameter and wall thickness to hemodynamic and metabolic stimuli. Pries AR, Reglin B, Secomb TW. Hypertension 2005; 46(4): 726–731.
- The endothelial surface layer. Pries AR, Secomb TW, Gaehtgens P. Pflügers Arch 2000; 440(5): 653–666.
- Design principles of vascular beds. Pries AR, Secomb TW, Gaehtgens P. Circ Res 1995; 77(5): 1017–1023.
- Resistance to blood flow in microvessels in vivo. Pries AR, Secomb TW, Gessner T, Sperandio MB, Gross JF, Gaehtgens P. Circ Res 1994; 75(5): 904–915.
