= David Prior =

David Prior may refer to:

- David Prior, Baron Prior of Brampton (born 1954), British Conservative Party politician
- David Prior (musician) (born 1972), British sound artist and composer
- David Prior (entrepreneur), Australian businessman and distillery owner
- David A. Prior (1955–2015), American screenwriter and director
- David Prior (born 1969), American film director, screenwriter, and producer

== See also ==
- David Pryor (born 1934), American politician
- David Priors, a fictional character from the BBC soap opera EastEnders
