= Charles Pryor (politician) =

American politician (1959–2024)

Member of the Missouri House of Representatives from the 116th district
- In office 1993–2001

Personal details
- Born: June 2, 1959 Liberty, Missouri, U.S.
- Died: April 29, 2024 (aged 64)
- Party: Republican

Charles Pryor (June 2, 1959 – April 29, 2024) was an American politician. He served as a Republican member for the 116th district of the Missouri House of Representatives.

== Life and career ==
Pryor was born in Liberty, Missouri on June 2, 1959. In 1993, Pryor was elected to represent the 116th district of the Missouri House of Representatives. He died on April 29, 2024, at the age of 64.
