= Joshua Pryor =

American football player (born 1999)

Profile
- Position: Defensive tackle

Personal information
- Born: October 25, 1999 (age 27); Baltimore, Maryland, U.S.
- Listed height: 6 ft 4 in (1.93 m)
- Listed weight: 280 lb (127 kg)

Career information
- High school: Dunbar (Baltimore)
- College: Bowie State (2017–2022)
- NFL draft: 2023: undrafted

Career history
- Washington Commanders (2023); Cincinnati Bengals (2024)*; Birmingham Stallions (2025)*
- * Offseason or practice squad member only

Career NFL statistics
- Tackles: 1
- Stats at Pro Football Reference

Joshua Zekiah Pryor (born October 25, 1999) is an American professional football defensive tackle. He played college football at Bowie State and was signed by the Washington Commanders as an undrafted free agent in 2023.

== Early life ==
Pryor was born on October 25, 1999, in Baltimore, Maryland. He began playing football at age five. He attended Paul Laurence Dunbar High School in Baltimore and was an unranked recruit. He began his collegiate career with the NCAA Division II Bowie State Bulldogs in 2017.

== College career ==
Pryor redshirted his first year at Bowie State in 2017, appearing in no games. In 2018, he appeared in 13 games and helped the Bulldogs win the Central Intercollegiate Athletic Association (CIAA) championship in 2018, totaling 55 tackles, fourth-best on the team, 20 tackles-for-loss, nine sacks, three forced fumbles, a fumble recovery and a blocked kick. For his performance, he was named first-team All-CIAA, the conference rookie of the year and to the CIAA All-Rookie team, additionally being chosen to the BoxToRow All-America team.

In 2019, Pryor helped Bowie State repeat as CIAA champions while posting 12.5 sacks and being named the team defensive most valuable player, BoxToRow All-American and first-team All-CIAA. He was also selected the Protect Your Skull Division II Defensive Player of the Year. After the 2020 season was canceled due to the COVID-19 pandemic, he was named second-team All-CIAA and helped the Bulldogs win a third-straight conference championship in 2021. In his final season, 2022, Pryor led the Bulldogs with 47 tackles, posted 1.05 tackles-for-loss, 3.5 sacks, two pass breakups and two forced fumbles on his way to being named first-team All-CIAA, the CIAA Defensive Player of the Year and second-team Associated Press All-American. He ended his collegiate career as the all-time school leader in sacks (32) and tackles-for-loss (77) and placed second in total tackles (245), additionally four forced fumbles. He was invited to the HBCU Legacy Bowl and had two sacks in the game. He graduated from Bowie State with a degree in communications.

== Professional career ==
Pre-draft measurables
Height	Weight	Arm length	Hand span	40-yard dash	10-yard split	20-yard split	20-yard shuttle	Three-cone drill	Vertical jump	Broad jump	Bench press
6 ft 3 1/2 in (1.92 m)	242 lb (110 kg)	32 5/8 in (0.83 m)	9 7/8 in (0.25 m)	4.85 s	1.72 s	2.65 s	4.49 s	7.60 s	34.5 in (0.88 m)	10 ft 0 in (3.05 m)	20 reps
All values from HBCU Combine/Pro Day

=== Washington Commanders ===
After going unselected in the 2023 NFL draft, Pryor was signed by the Washington Commanders as an undrafted free agent. He was released during roster cuts August 28. He was signed to the team's practice squad on October 10. He was elevated to the active roster for the Commanders' Week 11 game against the New York Giants. Pryor was signed to the active roster on December 14, 2023, and was waived on May 7, 2024.

=== Cincinnati Bengals ===
On August 7, 2024, Pryor signed with the Cincinnati Bengals. On August 23, Pryor was released by the Bengals.

=== Birmingham Stallions ===
On September 19, 2024, Pryor signed with the Birmingham Stallions of the United Football League (UFL). He was released on March 20, 2025.
