= Pry (software) =

Shell interface for the Ruby programming language

Pry REPL
- Developer(s): John Mair (banisterfiend), Conrad Irwin, …many more
- Stable release: 0.11.1 / September 26, 2017
- Repository: github.com/pry/pry
- Written in: Ruby
- Operating system: Cross-platform
- Platform: Ruby interpreter
- Type: Ruby shell
- License: MIT License
- Website: pry.github.io

Pry is an interactive shell for the Ruby programming language. It is notable for its Smalltalk-inspired ability to start a REPL within a running program. This lets programmers debug and modify the current state of a system.

== Features ==
Pry exposes most of its introspective capabilities using a filesystem metaphor. For example, it has a cd command to start interacting with a particular object, and uses ls to list methods and variables.

It is possible to start Pry at any point inside a running program. Due to the reflective nature of Ruby, this lets the programmer inspect the program, change its current state, or correct the source code without restarting the process.

A number of third party plugins are available for Pry, these add tighter integration with other Ruby projects, enhance the abilities of Pry itself, and make Pry available over a remote connection.

== See also ==
- Comparison of computer shells
- IPython — A similar piece of software for the Python programming language
- SLIME — An interactive Lisp shell for Emacs
- Tweak — A Smalltalk programming environment
